= 2023 London Marathon =

43rd annual marathon race in London

43rd London Marathon
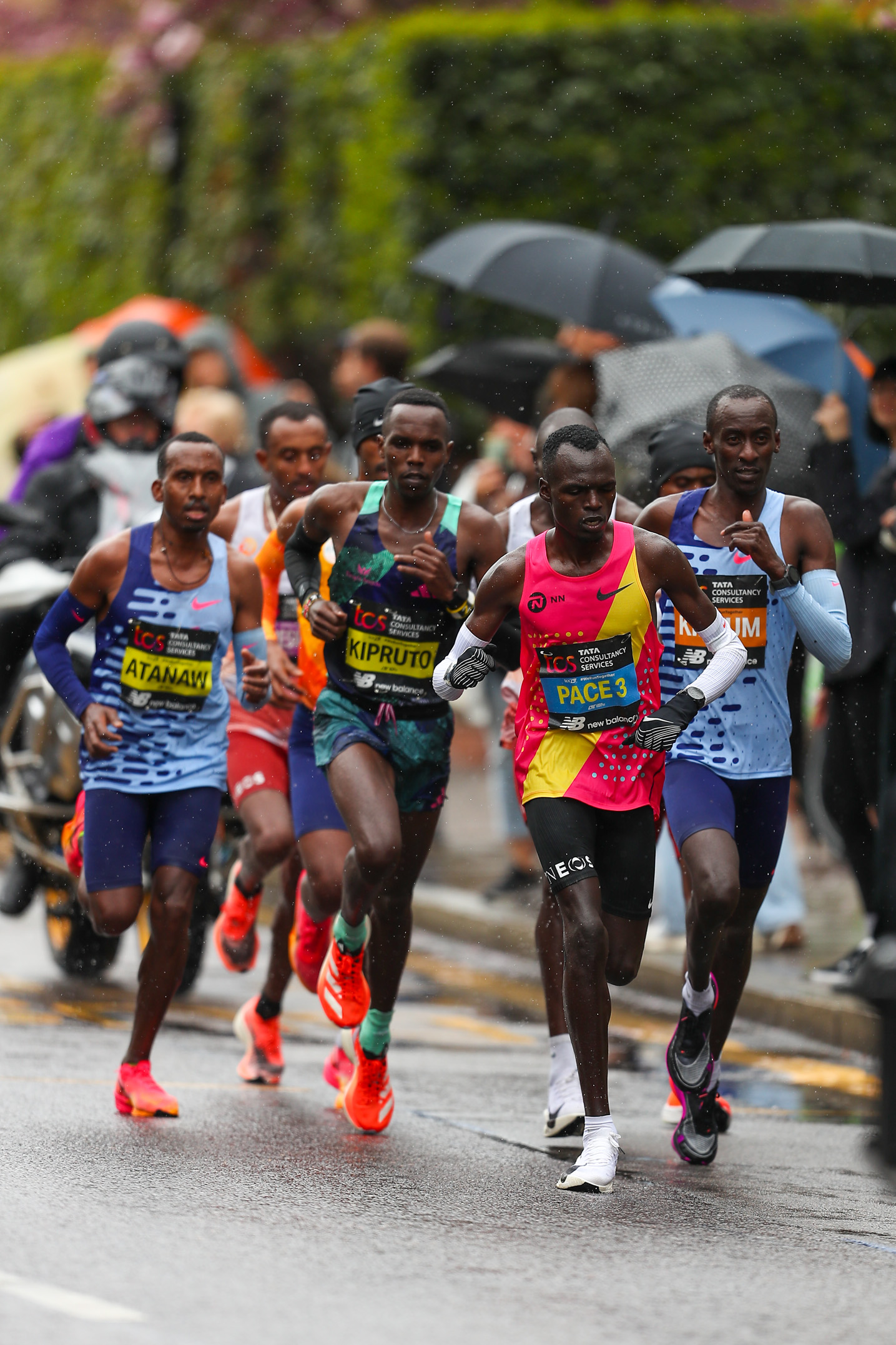
- Lead group of elite men during the race
- Venue: London, England
- Date: 23 April 2023
- Competitors: 49,272

Champions
- Men: Kelvin Kiptum (2:01:25)
- Women: Sifan Hassan (2:18:33)
- Wheelchair men: Marcel Hug (1:23:44)
- Wheelchair women: Madison de Rozario (1:38:51)

The 2023 London Marathon was the 43rd running of the annual London Marathon on 23 April 2023. It was the first time since 2019 that the event was run in the spring, as the previous three races were run in autumn due to the COVID-19 pandemic.

The elite men's and women's events were won by Kelvin Kiptum and Sifan Hassan in times of 2:01:25 and 2:18:33 respectively; Kiptum's time was a course record. The wheelchair men's and women's competitions were won by Marcel Hug and Madison de Rozario in course record times of 1:23:44 and 1:38:51 respectively. Around 48,000 athletes finished the mass participation event, beating the previous record set in 2019.

== Background ==
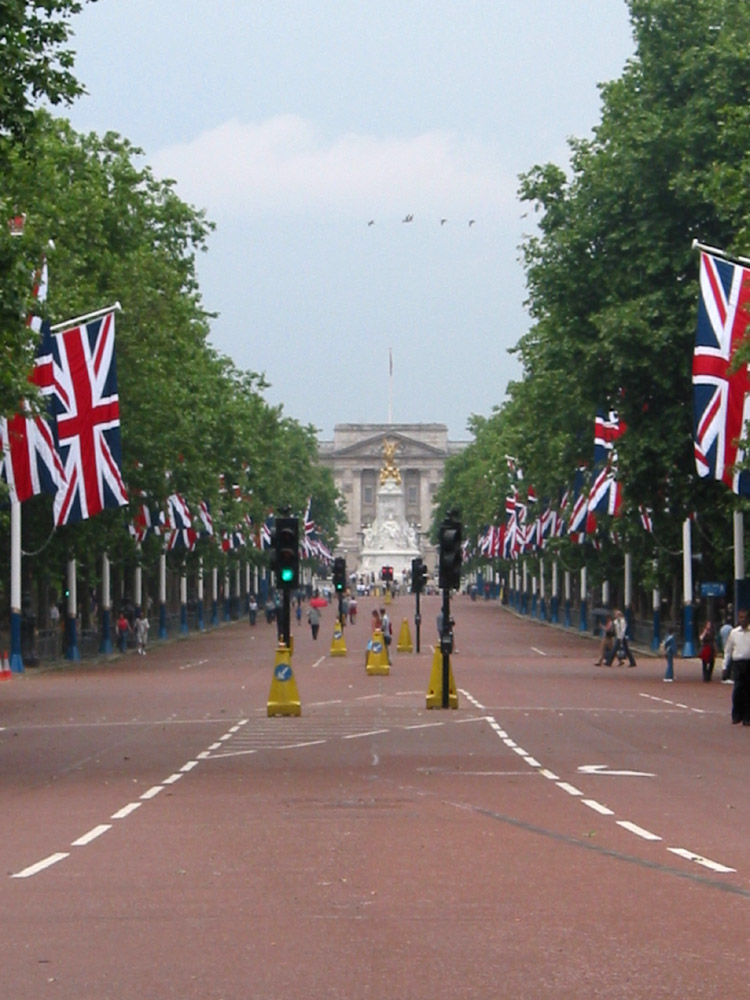
The Mall, the location of the finish of the race

In August 2021, race organisers confirmed that the 2023 event would take place on 23 April; the 2020, 2021 and 2022 events were all held in autumn due to the COVID-19 pandemic. The winners of the elite events received $55,000, and prizes were given to the top 10 finishers. The total prize money for each elite event was $313,000. The prize money for the winners of the wheelchair races was increased by $10,000 to $45,000, with total prize money for each wheelchair event increased from $199,500 to $253,500.

For the first time, competitors in the mass participation event could register as non-binary; there was no elite event for non-binary competitors. 118 non-binary competitors signed for the race. There was a virtual marathon held on the same date as the in-person event. In the United Kingdom, the races were broadcast on BBC One, and it was broadcast in 197 countries.

=== Course ===
The marathon distance was officially 42.195 kilometres (26.219 mi) long as sanctioned by World Athletics. The London Marathon was run over a mainly flat course, starting in Blackheath. The course began at three separate points and they converged just before 3 miles (4.8 km) into the race. At just after 10 kilometres (6.2 mi) into the race, the runners reached the 19th-century clipper Cutty Sark docked in Greenwich and at about halfway into the race, the runners crossed Tower Bridge before heading east into Shadwell and Canary Wharf. After winding through Canary Wharf, the route returned through Shadwell on the other side of the road to which it entered before passing through Tower Hill. The runners entered the underpass in Blackfriars before running along the Thames Embankment, past Westminster and onto Birdcage Walk. The course then ran parallel to St James's Park before turning onto The Mall and finishing in front of Buckingham Palace.

== Competitors ==
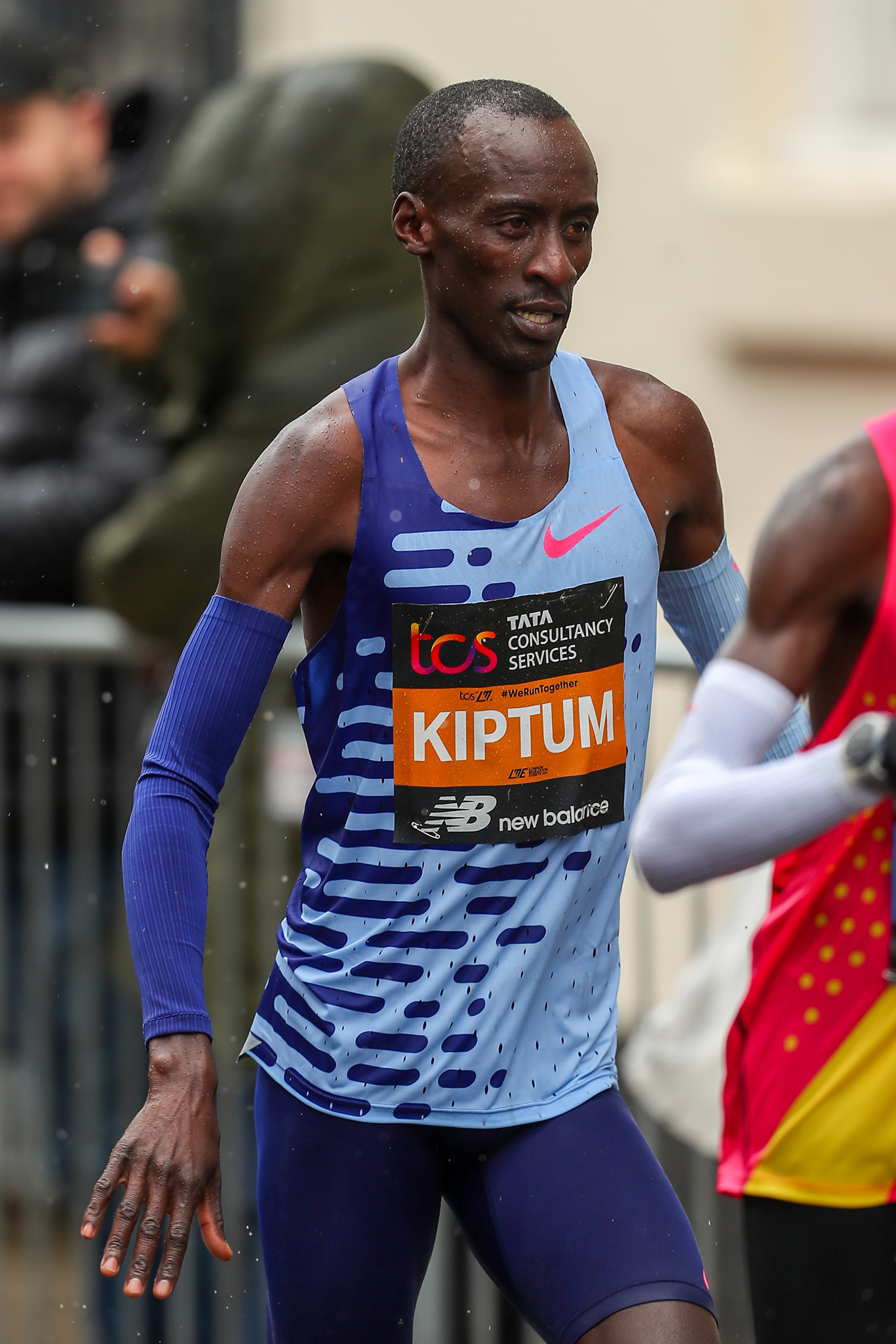
Kelvin Kiptum won the elite men's event.

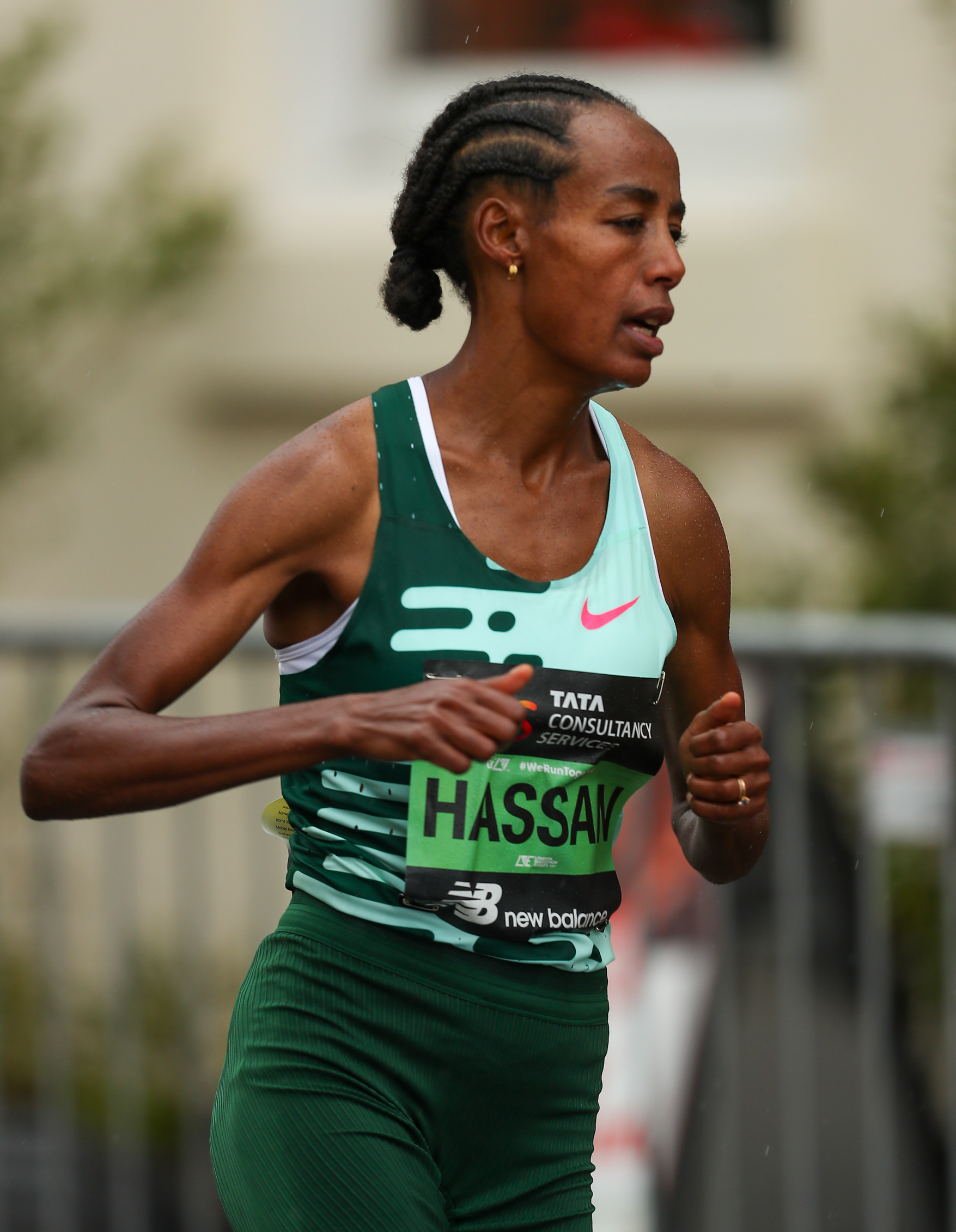
Sifan Hassan won the elite women's event.

The elite men's race featured four of the fastest five competitors in history: Kenenisa Bekele, Kelvin Kiptum, Birhanu Legese and Mosinet Geremew. Bekele has won multiple Olympic medals and Kiptum recorded the fastest marathon debut ever at the 2022 Valencia Marathon. Amos Kipruto, who won the 2022 race, also returned in 2023. Other competitors included Tamirat Tola, who won the marathon event at the 2022 World Athletics Championships, Geoffrey Kamworor, who has won two New York City Marathons, Leul Gebresilase, who finished second at the 2022 London Marathon, and Vincent Kipchumba, who finished second in both 2020 and 2021. Briton Mo Farah raced in his final London Marathon, and other British athletes included Weynay Ghebresilasie, the fastest finishing Briton in 2022, Emile Cairess, Chris Thompson and Dewi Griffiths. World record holder Eliud Kipchoge did not compete in London, as he chose to race the 2023 Boston Marathon instead.

The elite women's race featured five runners with a personal best (PB) time under 2:18, and ten runners with a PB under 2:19. Competitors included world record holder Brigid Kosgei, 2020 Summer Olympics champion Peres Jepchirchir and 2022 winner Yalemzerf Yehualaw. Other competitors included Genzebe Dibaba, the record holder in the 1,500 metres and Almaz Ayana, who won the 10,000 metres event at the 2016 Summer Olympics. Sifan Hassan, who won the 5,000 and 10,000 metres events at the 2020 Olympics made her marathon debut, and Sheila Chepkirui was a late addition to the field, after being unable to get a US visa to run the Boston Marathon. British competitors included Stephanie Davis, Samantha Harrison and Alice Wright.

Tigist Assefa, who won the 2022 Berlin Marathon, withdrew in March 2023 due to tendonitis. Britons Jess Piasecki and Charlotte Purdue both withdrew in the same month. On 21 April, Briton Eilish McColgan withdrew due to a knee injury; she had been scheduled to make her marathon debut at the event.

The men's wheelchair competition featured Marcel Hug, who had won the previous two events. Other competitors included Daniel Romanchuk, who came second in 2022, and eight-time former winner David Weir in his 24th consecutive London Marathon.

The women's wheelchair event featured 2022 winner Catherine Debrunner, as well as former winners Manuela Schär, Madison de Rozario, Nikita den Boer, Tatyana McFadden and Shelly Woods. Other competitors included Susannah Scaroni, who won the 2022 Chicago Marathon, and Eden Rainbow-Cooper, who came third in her marathon debut at the 2022 race.

== Race summary ==
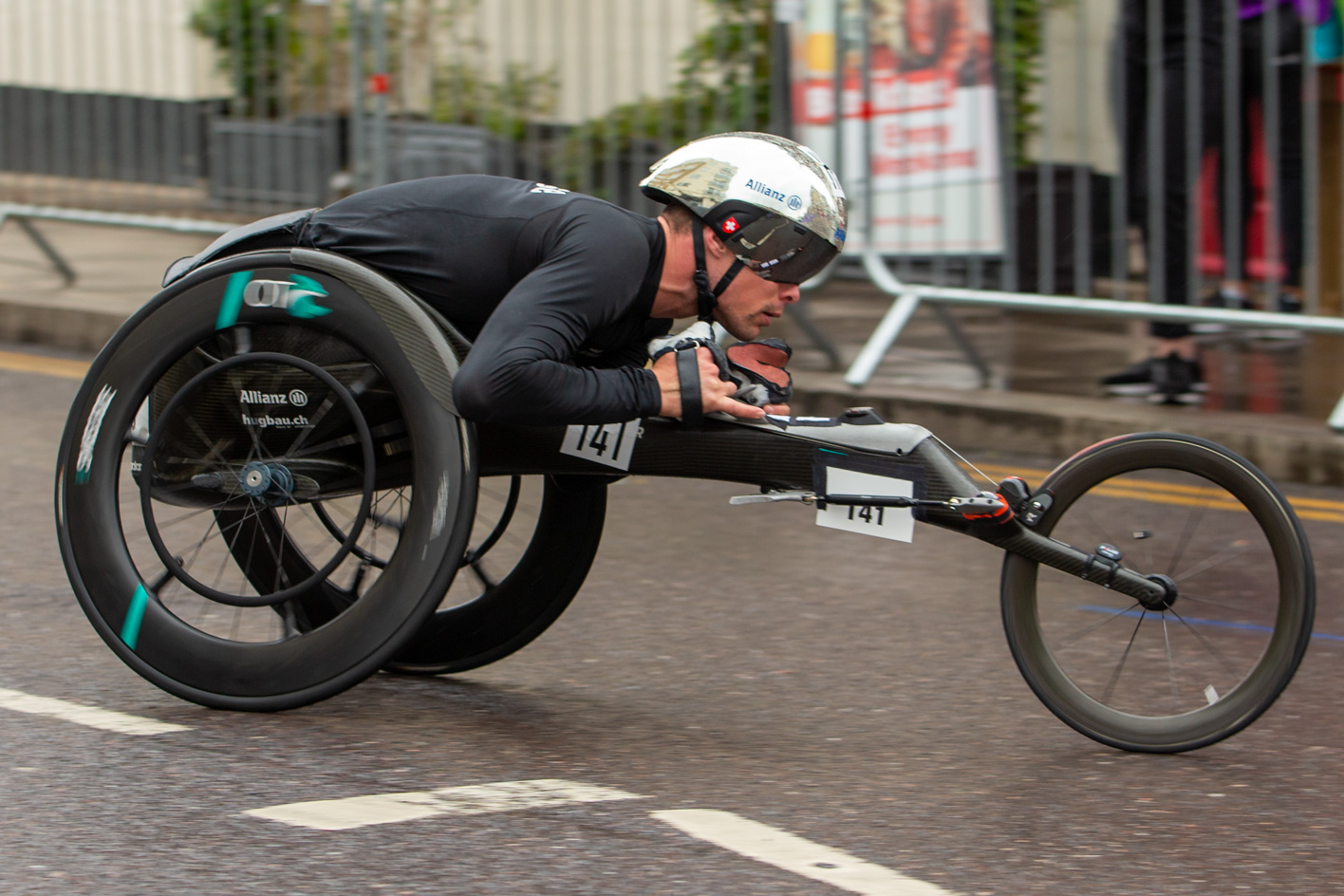
Marcel Hug won the wheelchair men's event.

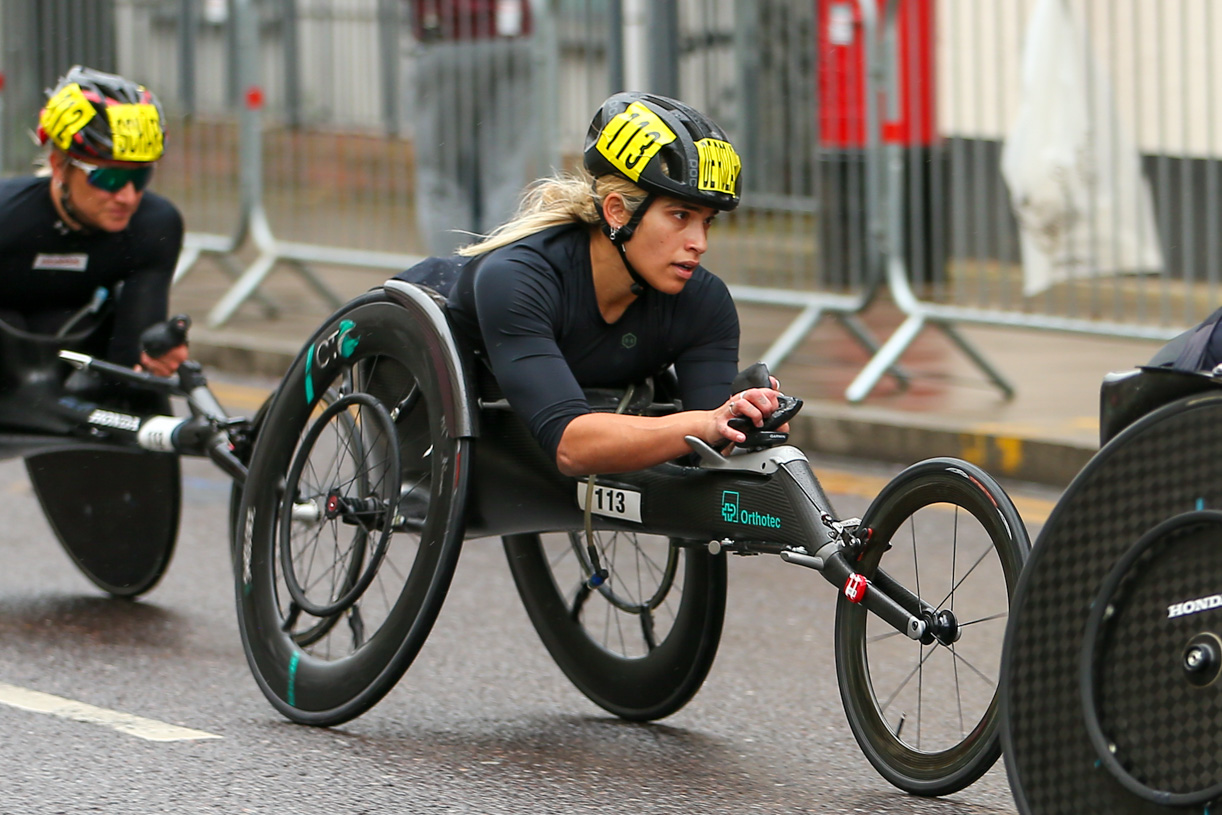
Madison de Rozario won the wheelchair women's event.

The wheelchair races commenced at 09:15 BST (UTC+1), the elite women's competition began at 09:25 BST and the elite men's event started at 10:00 BST. The wheelchair races were started by Gordon Perry, who won the inaugural London Marathon wheelchair event in 1983. The elite women's race was started by former London Marathon winners Ingrid Kristiansen and Catherina McKiernan, whilst the elite men's and mass participation events were started by Eliud Kipchoge. The elite and wheelchair races were run in mostly dry conditions, whilst there was heavy rain at times during the mass participation event.

The elite men's race was won by Kelvin Kiptum in a course record time of 2:01:25, 16 seconds slower than Eliud Kipchoge's world record, and 72 seconds faster than Kipchoge's previous course best. At the halfway stage, the leading pack contained eight runners, and Kiptum broke away from the leading pack after 30 kilometres (19 mi). Kiptum won by nearly three minutes, and his time for the second half of the race was the fastest ever. Kiptum received $230,000 for his victory, breaking the course record and finishing quicker than 2:03:00. Geoffrey Kamworor finished second, and Tamirat Tola was third overall. Marathon debutante Emile Cairess was the top British finisher in sixth place; his time of 2:08:07 made him the third fastest Briton in history. Other Britons in the top 10 finishers included Phil Sesemann, Mo Farah and Chris Thompson.

The elite women's event was won by marathon debutante Sifan Hassan in a time of 2:18:33. Brigid Kosgei withdrew with an injury in the first four minutes of the race; she completed less than 1 mile (1.6 km). After an hour of racing, Hassan pulled up with an apparent leg injury, and she was eleven seconds behind the leading pack at half distance. Later in the race, she stopped for a second time to stretch her quadriceps. After the race, Hassan revealed she had had a problem with her hip, and that she had not taped it up prior to the race. Hassan caught the leading pack of Sheila Chepkirui, Peres Jepchirchir, Judith Korir and Yalemzerf Yehualaw after 30 kilometres (19 mi). Towards the end, Hassan almost missed a drinks station, and afterwards she offered a drink to rival Yalemzerf Yehualaw. The race was decided in a sprint finish; Yehualaw had been dropped prior to the sprint finish. In the sprint, Hassan beat Alemu Megertu and Jepchirchir, who finished second and third respectively. Samantha Harrison was the top finishing Briton in 11th; her time was six minutes faster than her previous personal best, and was the fifth fastest time by a British woman ever. She was quicker than the qualifying time for the 2024 Summer Olympics.

The men's wheelchair competition was won by Marcel Hug, in a course record time of 1:23:44, 50 seconds faster than his previous course record at the event. Hug won the race by five minutes, and it was his third consecutive London Marathon victory, and fifth in total. Jetze Plat finished in second place, and Tomoki Suzuki was third. David Weir was the best finishing Briton in fifth place.

The women's wheelchair race was won by Madison de Rozario in a sprint finish; the top four competitors finished within six seconds of each other. De Rozario finished in a course record time of 1:38:51, one second ahead of Manuela Schär. Catherine Debrunner finished third and Susannah Scaroni was fourth. Eden Rainbow-Cooper was the highest finishing Briton in seventh place.

=== Non elite races ===
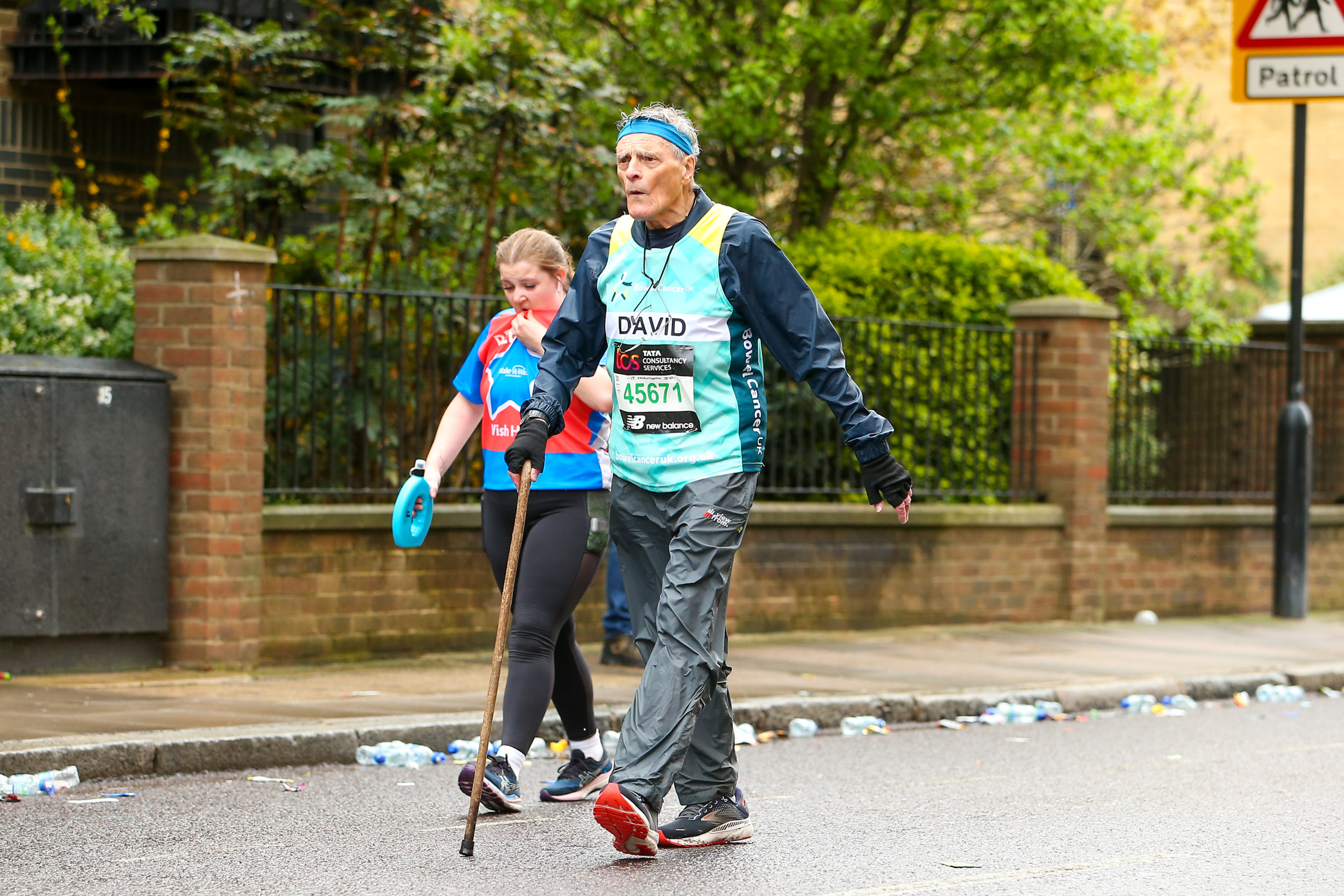
90-year-old David Picksley (right) was the oldest finisher.

A mini-marathon took place on 22 April, and was started by Jake Wightman, who won the 1,500 metres event at the 2022 World Athletics Championships. The events were run over distances of 1 mile (1.6 km) and 2.6 kilometres (1.6 mi), and over 8,000 children ran, the most competitors at any London mini-marathon.

The main mass participation event started in waves between 10:00 and 11:30 BST. There were 49,272 starters, more than any previous London Marathon. There were expected to be around 48,000 finishers, and by 17:00 BST the event had beaten the previous record of 42,549 finishers set in 2019. The youngest competitor was 18 years and one day old, and the oldest was aged 90. Former sportspeople who competed in the marathon event included former Olympic curler Eve Muirhead and former England rugby union captain Chris Robshaw. Other celebrity competitors included Waterloo Road actor Ben Ryan Davies, presenters Chris Evans and Adele Roberts, Harry Judd from the band McFly, Marcus Mumford of Mumford & Sons actor Josh O'Connor and 10 then current Members of Parliament, including Chancellor of the Exchequer Jeremy Hunt. Adele Roberts broke the marathon record for a competitor running with a stoma bag.

== Results ==
=== Men ===
Elite men's top 10 finishers
Position	Athlete	Nationality	Time
1st place, gold medalist(s)	Kelvin Kiptum	Kenya	02:01:25
2nd place, silver medalist(s)	Geoffrey Kamworor	Kenya	02:04:23
3rd place, bronze medalist(s)	Tamirat Tola	Ethiopia	02:04:59
4	Leul Gebresilase	Ethiopia	02:05:45
5	Seifu Tura	Ethiopia	02:06:38
6	Emile Cairess	United Kingdom	02:08:07
7	Brett Robinson	Australia	02:10:19
8	Philip Sesemann	United Kingdom	02:10:23
9	Mo Farah	United Kingdom	02:10:28
10	Chris Thompson	United Kingdom	02:11:50

=== Women ===
Elite women's top 10 finishers
Position	Athlete	Nationality	Time
1st place, gold medalist(s)	Sifan Hassan	Netherlands	02:18:33
2nd place, silver medalist(s)	Alemu Megertu	Ethiopia	02:18:37
3rd place, bronze medalist(s)	Peres Jepchirchir	Kenya	02:18:38
4	Sheila Chepkirui	Kenya	02:18:51
5	Yalemzerf Yehualaw	Ethiopia	02:18:53
6	Judith Jeptum Korir	Kenya	02:20:41
7	Almaz Ayana	Ethiopia	02:20:44
8	Tadu Teshome	Ethiopia	02:21:31
9	Sofiia Yaremchuk	Italy	02:24:02
10	Susanna Sullivan	United States	02:24:27

=== Wheelchair men ===
Wheelchair men's top 10 finishers
Position	Athlete	Nationality	Time
1st place, gold medalist(s)	Marcel Hug	Switzerland	01:23:44
2nd place, silver medalist(s)	Jetze Plat	Netherlands	01:28:44
3rd place, bronze medalist(s)	Tomoki Suzuki	Japan	01:30:00
4	Daniel Romanchuk	United States	01:30:18
5	David Weir	United Kingdom	01:32:45
6	Sho Watanabe	Japan	01:35:03
7	Jake Lappin	Australia	01:35:15
8	Michael McCabe	United Kingdom	01:35:15
9	Evan Correll	United States	01:35:15
10	Ernst Van Dyk	South Africa	01:35:18

=== Wheelchair women ===
Wheelchair women's top 10 finishers
Position	Athlete	Nationality	Time
1st place, gold medalist(s)	Madison de Rozario	Australia	01:38:51
2nd place, silver medalist(s)	Manuela Schär	Switzerland	01:38:52
3rd place, bronze medalist(s)	Catherine Debrunner	Switzerland	01:38:54
4	Susannah Scaroni	United States	01:38:57
5	Wakako Tsuchida	Japan	01:47:40
6	Aline Rocha	Brazil	01:47:41
7	Eden Rainbow-Cooper	United Kingdom	01:47:43
8	Jenna Fesemyer	United States	01:47:43
9	Tsubasa Kina	Japan	01:47:48
10	Merle Menje	Germany	01:51:31
