= 2022 London Marathon =

42nd annual marathon race in London

42nd London Marathon
- Venue: London, England
- Date: 2 October 2022
- Competitors: 40,000+

Champions
- Men: Amos Kipruto (2:04:39)
- Women: Yalemzerf Yehualaw (2:17.26)
- Wheelchair men: Marcel Hug (1:24.38)
- Wheelchair women: Catherine Debrunner (1:38.24)

The 2022 London Marathon was the 42nd running of the annual London Marathon on 2 October 2022. Due to the COVID-19 pandemic the race was postponed from April until October to maximise the chances of a mass participation event. The elite men's and women's event were won by Kenyan Amos Kipruto and Ethiopian Yalemzerf Yehualaw respectively. The wheelchair races were won by Swiss athletes Marcel Hug and Catherine Debrunner respectively, both in course record times. Over 40,000 people finished the mass participation event.

== Background ==
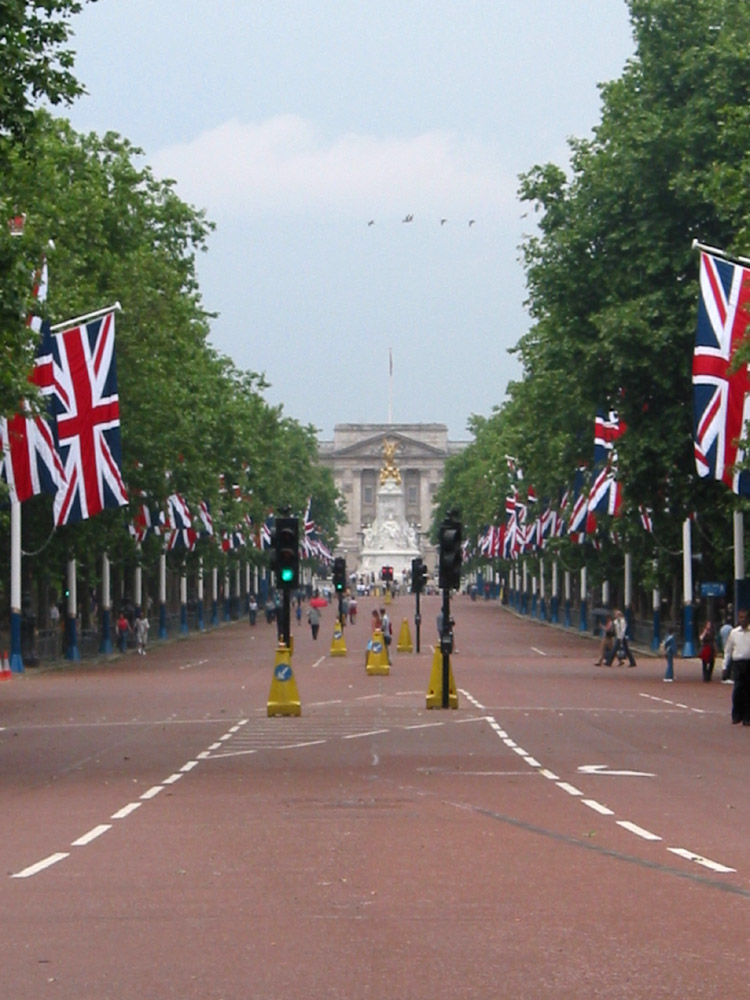
The Mall, the location of the finish of the race.

In August 2021, the 2022 London Marathon was postponed from April until October, to increase the chances that such a large event could be held safely during the COVID-19 pandemic. It was the third successive year that the race has been held in autumn. The 2023 event was held in April 2023. In the United Kingdom, the event was broadcast on the BBC. Every race since 1981 has been televised on the BBC, and in June 2022, it won the rights to broadcast the race until 2026.

The winner of the men's and women's elite races each received $55,000. Prize money was also on offer for breaking a course record or beating a pre-specified time, and the total prize fund for each race was $313,000. The prize money for the wheelchair races was increased for 2022, with the winners receiving $35,000, an increase of $10,000 from the previous year. $20,000 and $15,000 was awarded to the competitors who finish second and third respectively, and for the first time the top 10 finishers all received prize money. The total prize fund for each of the wheelchair races was $199,500.

=== Course ===
The marathon distance is officially 42.195 kilometres (26.219 mi) long as sanctioned by World Athletics (IAAF). The London Marathon is run over a mainly flat course, starting in Blackheath. The course begins at three separate points and they converge just before 3 miles (4.8 km) into the race. At just after 10 kilometres (6.2 mi) into the race, the runners reach the 19th-century clipper Cutty Sark docked in Greenwich and at about halfway into the race, the runners cross Tower Bridge before heading east into Shadwell and Canary Wharf. After winding through Canary Wharf, the route returns through Shadwell on the other side of the road to which it entered before passing through Tower Hill. The runners enter the underpass in Blackfriars before running along the Thames Embankment, past Westminster and onto Birdcage Walk. The course then runs parallel to St James's Park before turning onto The Mall and finishing in front of Buckingham Palace.

== Competitors ==
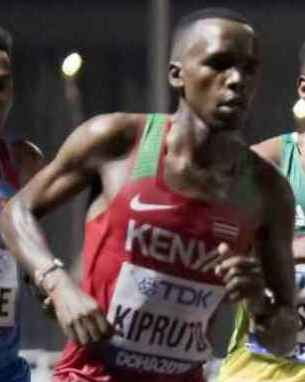
Amos Kipruto, pictured here in 2019, won the elite men's event.

The top three finishers in the 2021 elite women's race – winner Joyciline Jepkosgei and runners-up Degitu Azimeraw and Ashete Bekere – all competed in 2022. Yalemzerf Yehualaw, the world record holder in the 10 kilometres event, competed in her first London Marathon – her time of 2:17:23 at the 2022 Hamburg Marathon was the fastest by a marathon debutant ever. Other competitors with a personal best of under 2:20:00 included Joan Chelimo Melly, Sutume Asefa Kebede, Alemu Megertu and Hiwot Gebrekidan. Judith Korir was a late addition to the field; she had originally intended to be a pacemaker at the event.

2019 and 2020 winner Brigid Kosgei, who finished fourth in 2021, was scheduled to race, but withdrew due to an injury. Briton Eilish McColgan, whose mother Liz won the 1996 London Marathon, withdrew for medical reasons in September 2022. It would have been her first marathon competition. British runner Charlotte Purdue, who finished tenth in the 2021 race, withdrew on the day due to illness.

The elite men's race featured 2021 winner Sisay Lemma, as well as Kenenisa Bekele, Birhanu Legese and Mosinet Geremew, the second, third and fifth-fastest marathon runners in history respectively. Legese had won the Tokyo Marathon twice. Bashir Abdi, who came third in the marathon event at the 2020 Summer Olympics raced in his first London Marathon, and Phil Sesemann, the best British finisher at the 2021 race, also competed in 2022. Vincent Kipchumba, who finished second in 2020 and 2021 was scheduled to compete, but later withdrew. Briton Mo Farah, who came third at the 2018 London Marathon and who was a pacemaker for the 2020 race, withdrew prior to the race due to a hip injury.

The women's wheelchair race included 2020 winner Nikita den Boer, Merle Menje, who finished second in the 2021 event at the age of 17, four-time London Marathon winner Tatyana McFadden, and Susannah Scaroni, the record holder in the 5,000 metres event. Catherine Debrunner, who won the 2022 Berlin Marathon on her marathon debut also competed. 2021 winner Manuela Schär, as well as Madison de Rozario, who won the marathon event at the delayed 2020 Summer Paralympics and the 2018 London Marathon, both planned to compete but withdrew due to illness.

The men's wheelchair competition featured 2021 winner Marcel Hug, as well as 2019 winner Daniel Romanchuk, who also won the 2022 Boston Marathon. Eight-time winner David Weir also competed.

== Race summary ==
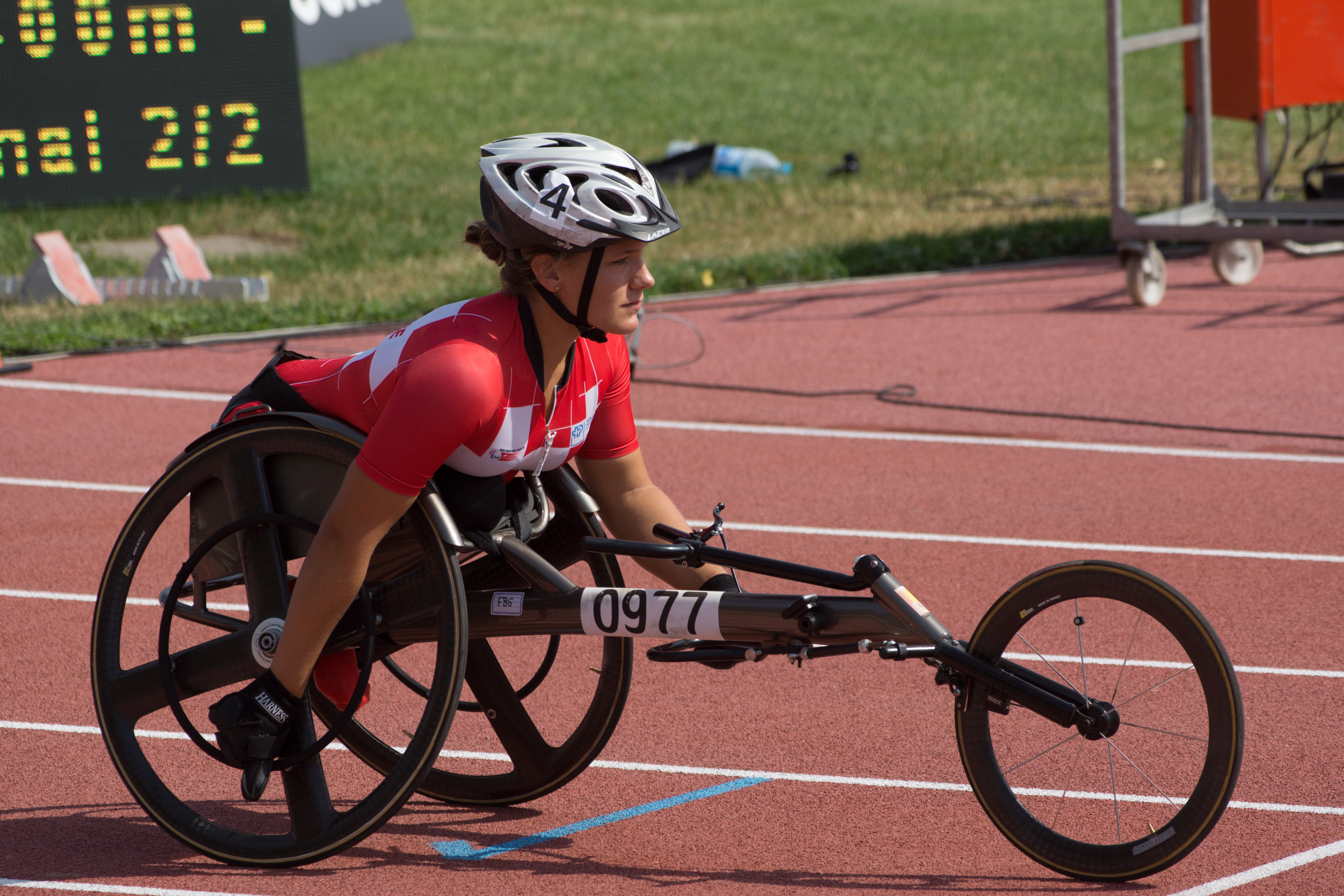
Catherine Debrunner, pictured here in 2013, won the women's wheelchair race.

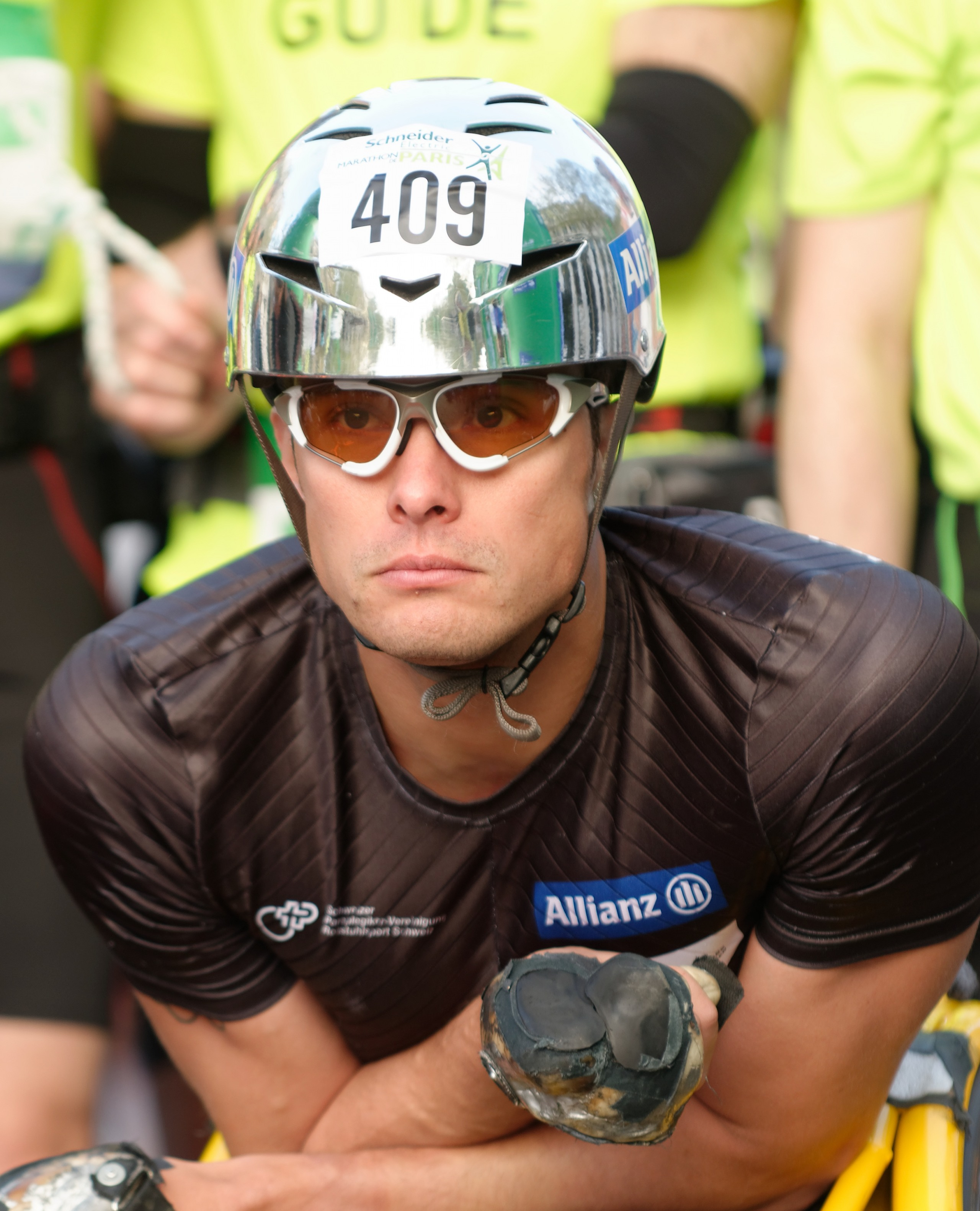
Marcel Hug, pictured here in 2014, won the men's wheelchair race.

The wheelchair races commenced at 08:50 BST (UTC+1), the elite women's competition began at 09:00 BST and the elite men's event started at 09:40 BST alongside the mass participation event. The races were started by England women's footballers Leah Williamson, Ellen White and Jill Scott, and were run in dry conditions.

The elite women's race was won by Ethiopian Yalemzerf Yehualaw, in a time of 2:17:26, the third fastest time in London Marathon history. At the age of 23, she was the youngest ever winner of the race. At the halfway point of the race, the leading pack contained Joyciline Jepkosgei, Yalemzerf Yehualaw, Alemu Megertu, Ashete Bekere, Judith Korir, Joan Melly, Asefa Kebede, and Hiwot Gebrekidan. At around 20 miles (32 km), Yehualaw tripped over on a speed bump, but later returned to the leading group. Around 35 kilometres (22 mi) into the race, Kebede, Melly, and Beker were distanced from the leading pack. Yehualaw broke away from the pack with around 4 miles (6.4 km) to go in the race. Jepkosgei finished second, and Megertu was third. Korir, Melly and Bekere also all finished the race in under 2:20:00. Rose Harvey was the fastest finishing Briton; she was tenth overall. Harvey had been assisted by pacemaker Calli Thackery until 32 kilometres (20 mi) into the race.

The elite men's competition was won by Kenyan Amos Kipruto, in a time of 2:04:39. The race featured British pacemakers Andrew Butchart and Emile Cairess. The leading pack stayed together until 35 kilometres (22 mi), and consisted of Kipruto, Kenenisa Bekele, Sisay Lemma, Leul Gebresilase, Bashir Abdi, Birhanu Legese and Kinde Atanaw. Kipruto took the lead whilst completing the 24th mile in a time of 4:36. Gebresilase finished second, with Abdi third. Bekele finished fifth after gaining two places in the final miles of the event. His time of 2:05:53 was a record for an over-40-year-old at the London Marathon. Weynay Ghebresilasie was the highest finishing Briton. He was ninth, and fellow countryman Phil Sesemann was 10th.

The women's wheelchair race was won by Swiss athlete Catherine Debrunner in a course record time of 1:38:24. Debrunner recovered from a crash during the race, and won the event by almost four minutes. Susannah Scaroni finished second and Eden Rainbow-Cooper was third.

The men's wheelchair competition was won by Swiss athlete Marcel Hug in a course record time of 1:24:38. Hug and Daniel Romanchuk took the lead early on, and after 25 kilometres (16 mi) of the event, they had a lead of around three minutes. Romanchuk finished two seconds behind Hug in second, and David Weir was third, after beating Tomoki Suzuki in a sprint finish.

=== Non-elite races ===
A mini-marathon for under-17s was held on 1 October. Over 40,000 people took part in the adult mass-participation event. The oldest runner was an 89-year-old Japanese man, and the youngest runner was 18 years old on the day of the event. During the race, one person collapsed and later died in hospital.

The mass-start race included former Olympians James Cracknell, Steve Batchelor, Tom McEwen, Iwan Thomas and Joan Benoit, who won the marathon event at the 1984 Summer Olympics in Los Angeles. Other sportspeople who competed included Formula E driver Sam Bird, former footballer Danny Mills and former rugby player Greg O'Shea, who also won the 2019 series of Love Island. Non-sporting celebrities that competed included television personality Mark Wright, Harry Judd from the band McFly, actor George Rainsford, BBC newsreader Sophie Raworth, and Jeremy Joseph, the owner of G-A-Y and Heaven nightclubs. Also competing was Anoosheh Ashoori, who had been freed from an Iranian prison earlier in the year.

== Results ==
Only the top 10 finishers in each race are listed.

=== Men ===
Elite men's top 10 finishers
| Position | Athlete | Nationality | Time |
|---|---|---|---|
| 1st place, gold medalist(s) | Amos Kipruto | Kenya | 02:04:39 |
| 2nd place, silver medalist(s) | Leul Gebresilase | Ethiopia | 02:05:12 |
| 3rd place, bronze medalist(s) | Bashir Abdi | Belgium | 02:05:19 |
| 4 | Kinde Atanaw | Ethiopia | 02:05:27 |
| 5 | Kenenisa Bekele | Ethiopia | 02:05:53 |
| 6 | Birhanu Legese | Ethiopia | 02:06:11 |
| 7 | Sisay Lemma | Ethiopia | 02:07:26 |
| 8 | Brett Robinson | Australia | 02:09:52 |
| 9 | Weynay Ghebresilasie | United Kingdom | 02:11:57 |
| 10 | Philip Sesemann | United Kingdom | 02:12:10 |

=== Women ===
Elite women's top 10 finishers
| Position | Athlete | Nationality | Time |
|---|---|---|---|
| 1st place, gold medalist(s) | Yalemzerf Yehualaw | Ethiopia | 02:17:26 |
| 2nd place, silver medalist(s) | Joyciline Jepkosgei | Kenya | 02:18:07 |
| 3rd place, bronze medalist(s) | Alemu Megertu | Ethiopia | 02:18:32 |
| 4 | Judith Jeptum Korir | Kenya | 02:18:43 |
| 5 | Joan Chelimo Melly | Romania | 02:19:27 |
| 6 | Ashete Bekere | Ethiopia | 02:19:30 |
| 7 | Mary Ngugi | Kenya | 02:20:22 |
| 8 | Sutume Asefa Kebede | Ethiopia | 02:20:44 |
| 9 | Ai Hosoda | Japan | 02:21:42 |
| 10 | Rose Harvey | United Kingdom | 02:27:59 |

=== Wheelchair men ===
Wheelchair men's top 10 finishers
| Position | Athlete | Nationality | Time |
|---|---|---|---|
| 1st place, gold medalist(s) | Marcel Hug | Switzerland | 01:24:38 |
| 2nd place, silver medalist(s) | Daniel Romanchuk | United States | 01:24:40 |
| 3rd place, bronze medalist(s) | David Weir | United Kingdom | 01:30:41 |
| 4 | Tomoki Suzuki | Japan | 01:30:41 |
| 5 | Jetze Plat | Netherlands | 01:30:44 |
| 6 | Aaron Pike | United States | 01:33:05 |
| 7 | Sho Watanabe | Japan | 01:34:16 |
| 8 | Jake Lappin | Australia | 01:34:16 |
| 9 | Patrick Monahan | Ireland | 01:34:16 |
| 10 | Johnboy Smith | United Kingdom | 01:34:17 |

=== Wheelchair women ===
Wheelchair women's top 10 finishers
| Position | Athlete | Nationality | Time |
|---|---|---|---|
| 1st place, gold medalist(s) | Catherine Debrunner | Switzerland | 01:38:24 |
| 2nd place, silver medalist(s) | Susannah Scaroni | United States | 01:42:21 |
| 3rd place, bronze medalist(s) | Eden Rainbow-Cooper | United Kingdom | 01:47:27 |
| 4 | Merle Menje | Germany | 01:47:28 |
| 5 | Jenna Fesemyer | United States | 01:47:28 |
| 6 | Wakako Tsuchida | Japan | 01:47:28 |
| 7 | Vanessa De Souza | Brazil | 01:47:29 |
| 8 | Yen Hoang | United States | 01:47:29 |
| 9 | Aline Rocha | Brazil | 01:47:32 |
| 10 | Christie Dawes | Australia | 01:47:33 |
