= Kinde Atanaw =

Ethiopian long-distance runner

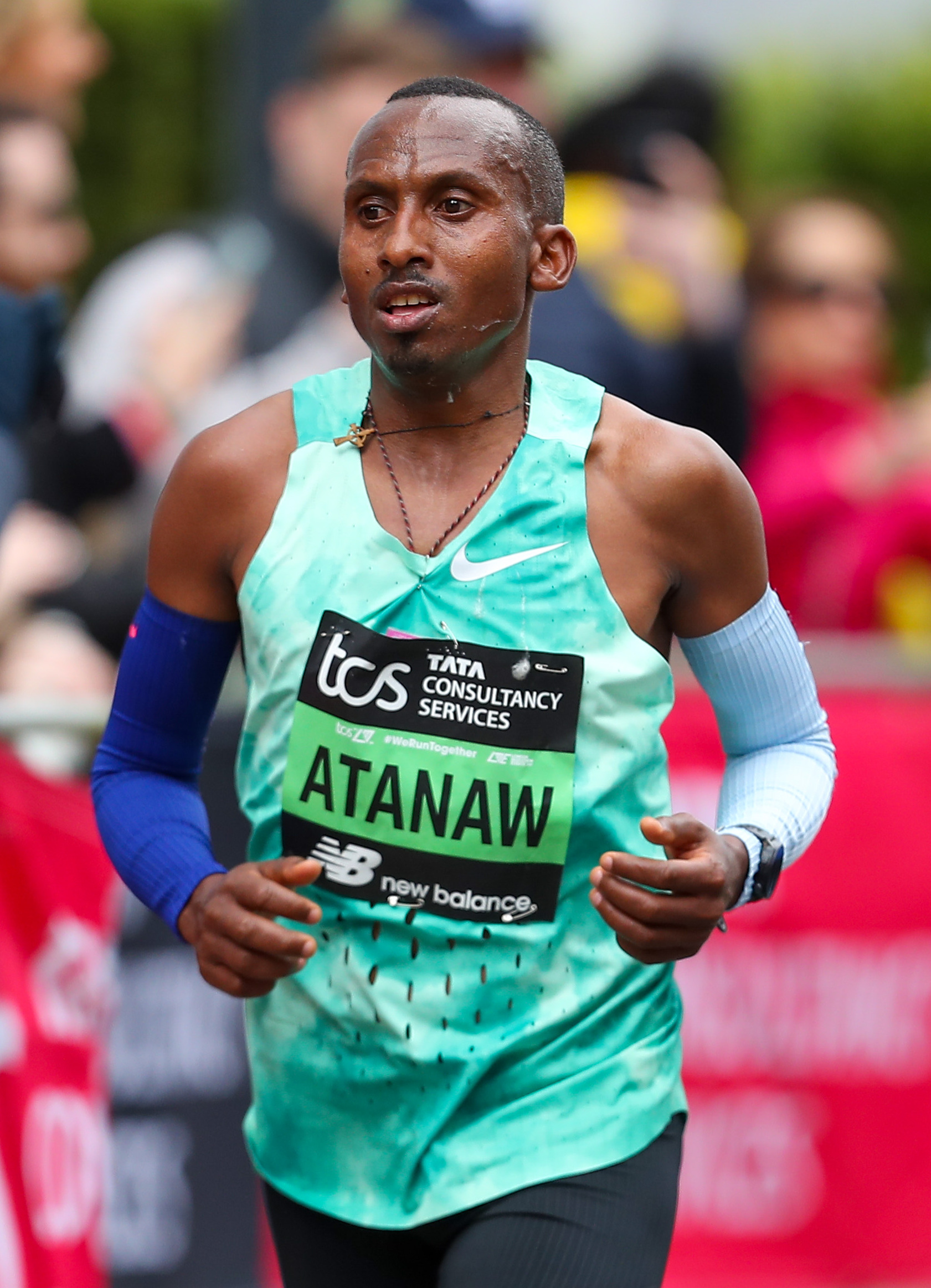
- Atanaw at the 2024 London Marathon

Personal information
- Nationality: Ethiopian
- Born: Kinde Atanaw; 15 April 1993 (age 33) Ethiopia
- Occupation: long-distance runner
- Years active: 2013–present

Sport
- Country: Ethiopia
- Sport: Athletics
- Events: Marathon, Half marathon, 10K Road

Achievements and titles
- Personal bests: Marathon: 2:03:51 (2019); Half marathon: 1:00:13 (2019); 10 Kilometres Road: 27:36 (2013)

Kinde Atanaw Ayalew (born 15 April 1993) is an Ethiopian long-distance runner specializing in marathon events. He is best known for winning the Valencia Marathon, where he set his personal best time of 2:03:51, making him one of the fastest marathoners in history. Atanaw has also achieved top finishes in World Marathon Majors, including 4th place at the 2022 London Marathon.

== Career ==
Kinde Atanaw emerged on the international road running scene with strong performances in shorter distances before transitioning to the marathon. He recorded a personal best of 27:36 in the 10 kilometres road race in 2013, and a half marathon best of 1:00:13 in 2019.

In December 2019, Atanaw won the Valencia Marathon in 2:03:51, setting a course record. It was the third-fastest marathon debut time in history. His performance was described as "stunning" because it was far better than his 60:13 half marathon time set earlier that year. He said after the race, "I had a lot of confidence in myself. I knew the time had come for my marathon debut. My training had gone well, and compared to my training partners, I knew I was better than them to win". He wore Vaporfly super shoes during his run.

Atanaw was part of the elite field at the 2021 London Marathon. However, he had to withdraw after testing positive for COVID-19.

Atanaw finished 4th at the 2022 London Marathon in 2:05:27, and 10th at the 2022 Boston Marathon with a time of 2:09:16.

In 2023, he was a featured entrant for the Mumbai Marathon, where his personal best of 2:03:51 led the pre-race field, though he did not finish the race. Later in the year, he was announced as one of the top Ethiopian contenders for the Shanghai Marathon. He finished 6th at the 2023 Shanghai Marathon with a time of 2:08:27.

In 2024, Atanaw finished 8th at the 2024 London Marathon with a time of 2:10:03.

In 2025, Atanaw finished 5th at the Haspa Marathon Hamburg with a time of 2:06:58.

=== Media coverage ===
Kinde Atanaw has attracted significant attention in sports journalism, particularly in the context of major international marathons.

In December 2019, Atanaw won the Valencia Marathon in a debut time of 2:03:53, setting a new course record. Spanish outlet Economía 3 reported that his surprise victory elevated Valencia to the sixth fastest marathon worldwide and the fastest in Europe at the time, offering analysis of how his late-race surge disrupted pre-race expectations.

In October 2021, Let's Run reported on Atanaw's unexpected withdrawal from the London Marathon following a positive COVID-19 test. The article highlighted his status among elite athletes and coaches in a chartered team, emphasizing how his illness led to his precautionary removal while the rest of the group was cleared to compete.

Ahead of the 2023 London Marathon, FastRunning provided an in-depth profile of Atanaw. The preview described his 2019 Valencia debut as “the best of his career” and reviewed his marathon history—including selective racing since 2016 and notable performances in Valencia, Prague, Boston, and London—placing his career trajectory within the context of elite distance running.

== Achievements ==
Year	Race	Location	Position	Time
2019	Valencia Marathon	Valencia	1st	2:03:51 (PB)
2022	Boston Marathon	Boston	10th	2:09:16
2022	London Marathon	London	4th	2:05:27
2023	Shanghai Marathon	Shanghai	6th	2:08:27
2024	London Marathon	London	8th	2:10:03
2025	Haspa Marathon Hamburg	Hamburg	5th	2:06:58
