= 2016 Berlin Marathon =

Marathon held in berlin, Germany, on 25 September 2016

43rd Berlin Marathon
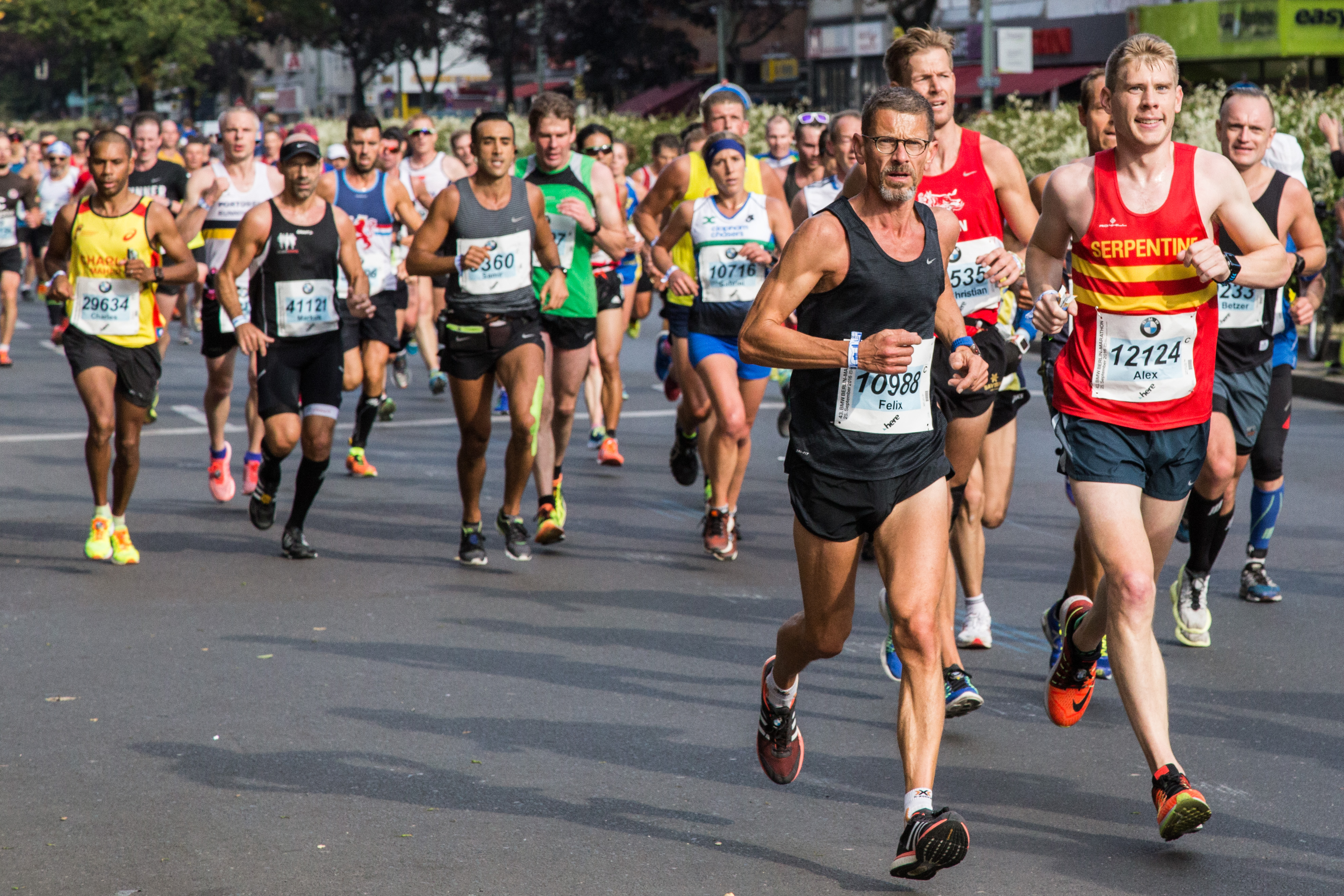
- Photograph of the 2016 Berlin Marathon
- Venue: Berlin, Germany
- Dates: 25 September 2016

Champions
- Men: Kenenisa Bekele (2:03:03)
- Women: Aberu Kebede (2:20:45)

The 2016 Berlin Marathon was the 43rd edition of the Berlin Marathon. The marathon took place in Berlin, Germany, on 25 September 2016 and was the fourth World Marathon Majors race of the year. The men's race was won by Kenenisa Bekele in 2 hours, 3 minutes and 3 seconds, the second fastest time ever. Wilson Kipsang was only 10 seconds behind him.

== Results ==
=== Men ===
Position	Athlete	Nationality	Time
1st place, gold medalist(s)	Kenenisa Bekele	Ethiopia	2:03:03
2nd place, silver medalist(s)	Wilson Kipsang	Kenya	2:03:13
3rd place, bronze medalist(s)	Evans Chebet	Kenya	2:05:31
4	Sisay Lemma	Ethiopia	2:06:56
5	Eliud Kiptanui	Kenya	2:07:47
6	Geoffrey Ronoh	Kenya	02:09:29
7	Alfers Lagat	Kenya	02:09:46
8	Yohanes Gebregergish	Eritrea	02:09:48
9	Jacob Kendagor	Kenya	02:10:01
10	Suleiman Simotwo	Kenya	02:10:22

=== Women ===
Position	Athlete	Nationality	Time
1st place, gold medalist(s)	Aberu Kebede	Ethiopia	2:20:45
2nd place, silver medalist(s)	Birhane Dibaba	Ethiopia	2:23:58
3rd place, bronze medalist(s)	Ruti Aga	Ethiopia	2:24:41
4	Reia Iwade	Japan	2:28:16
5	Katharina Heinig	Germany	2:28:34
6	Janet Ronoh	Kenya	02:29:35
7	Dolinin Elena	Israel	02:35:59
8	Cassie Fien	Australia	02:37:28
9	Claire McCarthy	Ireland	02:38:00
10	Gladys Ganiel	Ireland	02:39:10
