= Joyciline Jepkosgei =

Kenyan long-distance runner

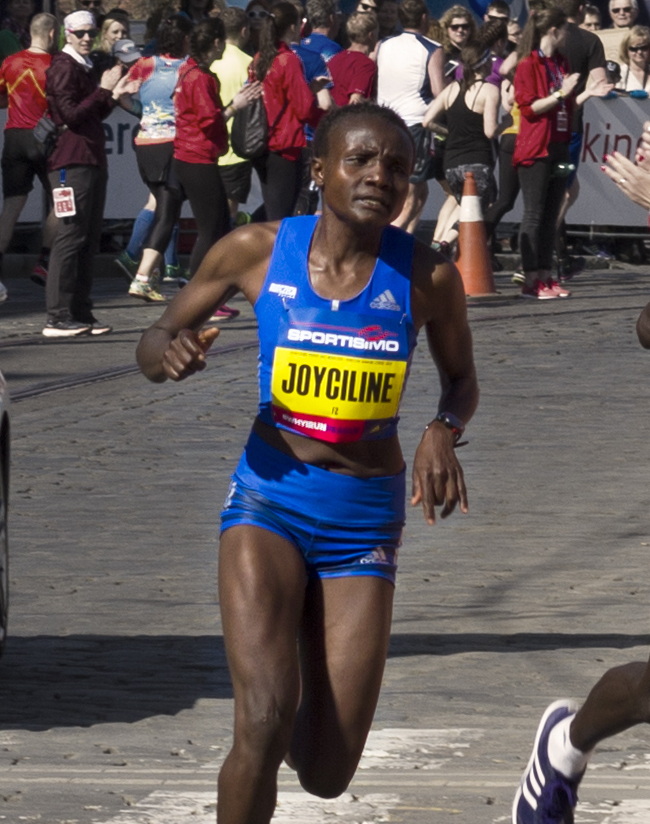
- Jepkosgei at the 2017 Prague Half Marathon

Personal information
- Born: 8 December 1993 (age 32) Rift Valley Province, Kenya

Sport
- Country: Kenya
- Sport: Track and field
- Event: Long-distance running
Medal record
Women's athletics
Representing Kenya
World Half Marathon Championships
Silver medal – second place	2018 Valencia	Individual
Silver medal – second place	2018 Valencia	Team
African Championships
Bronze medal – third place	2016 Durban	10,000 m
World Marathon Majors
Gold medal – first place	2019 New York	Marathon
Gold medal – first place	2021 London	Marathon
Silver medal – second place	2022 London	Marathon
Silver medal – second place	2025 London	Marathon
Bronze medal – third place	2024 London	Marathon
Bronze medal – third place	2026 London	Marathon

Joyciline Jepkosgei (born 8 December 1993) is a Kenyan female long-distance runner who competes over distances from 10,000 metres to the marathon. She is the former half marathon world record holder in contests with mixed-gender fields with her personal best of 64:51 minutes, and additionally the former world record holder in the 10 km with 29:43 minutes. (Note: Results / world records for women are broken into mixed-gender and women-only records, because in a mixed-gender race a female may benefit from a male pacer.) She was a bronze medallist over 10,000 m at the African Championships in Athletics in 2016. Jepkosgei ran a world record for the half marathon of 1:04:52 at the Prague Half Marathon in April 2017, becoming the first woman ever to break 65 minutes. She also unofficially broke the IAAF-ratified records for 10 km, 15 km and 20 km along the way, breaking a total of four world records in a single event. She became the first Kenyan ever to break six world records in six months.

== Career ==
Jepkosgei emerged as a professional level runner at the 2015 Nairobi Half Marathon, where she finished fifth in 1:14:06 minutes. She knocked her best down to 1:09:09 minutes at the following year's First Lady's Half Marathon in the Kenyan capital, placing second to Valentine Kipketer. She improved two seconds further in winning the Karlovy Vary Half Marathon, which placed her in the top 35 runners that year.

A member of the Kenya Defence Forces, she was twice runner-up at their track championships in 2016 in the 5000 metres and 10,000 metres. A third-place finish in the 10,000 m at the Kenyan Athletics Championships led to her first international selection for the 2016 African Championships in Athletics. There she took the bronze medal in a personal best of 31:28.28 minutes. Jepkosgei ended her breakthrough year with a runner-up finish at the Prague Grand Prix and a win at the Marseille-Cassis Classique Internationale.

She competed in her first top level half marathon at the start of 2017 and took nearly three minutes off her personal best, crossing the line in 66:08 minutes to take third at the RAK Half Marathon. This made her the seventh fastest runner ever at that point. The winner, Peres Jepchirchir, broke the world record and Jepkosgei ran the fastest ever time for her placing, as did runner-up Mary Keitany. Both Jepchirchir and Keitany had won world titles for the half marathon distance, thus establishing Jepkosgei among the world's best. A month and a half later she returned to the distance and proved herself the fastest ever, winning the Prague Half Marathon. During that race she broke four world records en route, recording 30:05 at 10K, 45:37 at 15K and 61:25 at 20K.

In September 2017, with the aid of a male pacer, she further improved her own 10K world record to 29:43, just ahead of Fancy Chemutai (30:06), and Violah Jepchumba (30:25), at the Prague Grand Prix, thus becoming the first woman ever to run the distance under 30 minutes.

In November 2019, Jepkosgei won the New York City Marathon in her official debut at the distance with a time of 2:22:38, the second fastest time on the course for women.

In 2020, she competed in the women's half marathon at the 2020 World Athletics Half Marathon Championships held in Gdynia, Poland.

Jepkosgei won the 2021 London Marathon after taking the lead 22 miles (35 km) into the race and becoming the seventh fastest female marathoner in history with 2:17:43.

The next year, the 28-year-old came seventh at the 2022 Boston Marathon in April in a time of 2:24:43. At the 2022 London Marathon in October, Jepkosgei placed second behind only Yalemzerf Yehualaw, clocking 2:18:07 and missing her personal best by 24 seconds.

In November 2025 she ran a personal best of 2:14:00 at the Valencia Marathon, course record and then the 4th fastest time in history.

== Personal life ==
Jepkosgei was coached by her husband, Nicholas Koech, until 2019 and has a son, Brandon, born in 2011.

== Personal bests ==
- 5000 metres (outdoor track) – 15:19.1h (Nairobi 2019)
- 5 kilometres (road) - 14:32 (Prague 2017) NR
- 10,000 metres (track) – 31:28.28 (Durban 2016)
- 10 kilometres (road) – 29:43 (Prague 2017) Former world record
- 15 kilometres (road) – 45:37 (Prague 2017)
- 20 kilometres (road) – 1:01:25 (Prague 2017) World best
- Half marathon – 1:04:13 (Barcelona 2025)
- Marathon – 2:14:00 (Valencia 2025)

== International competitions ==
Representing Kenya
Year	Competition	Venue	Position	Event	Notes
2016	African Championships	Durban, South Africa	3rd	10,000 m	31:28.28
2018	World Half Marathon Championships	Valencia, Spain	2nd	Half marathon	66:11
2019	New York City Half Marathon	New York, United States	1st	Half Marathon	1:10:07
World Marathon Majors
2019	New York City Marathon	New York, United States	1st	Marathon	2:22:38
2021	London Marathon	London, United Kingdom	1st	Marathon	2:17:43
2022	Boston Marathon	Boston, United States	7th	Marathon	2:24:43
2022	London Marathon	London, United Kingdom	2nd	Marathon	2:18:07
2023	Boston Marathon	Boston, United States	12th	Marathon	2:24:44
2023	Chicago Marathon	Chicago, United States	4th	Marathon	2:17:23
2024	London Marathon	London, United Kingdom	3rd	Marathon	2:16:24
2024	Chicago Marathon	Chicago, United States	5th	Marathon	2:20:51
2025	London Marathon	London, United Kingdom	2nd	Marathon	2:18:44
2026	London Marathon	London, United Kingdom	3rd	Marathon	2:15:55

== Circuit wins ==
- Marseille-Cassis Classique Internationale (half marathon): 2016
- Karlovy Vary Half Marathon: 2016
- Prague Half Marathon: 2017
- New York City Half Marathon: 2019

== Notes ==
Records
Preceded by (Kenya) Peres Jepchirchir	Women's Half marathon World record holder 1 April 2017 – 21 February 2020	Succeeded by (Ethiopia) Ababel Yeshaneh
