= Philip Sesemann =

British long-distance runner (born 1992)

Personal information
- Born: Philip William Sesemann; 3 October 1992 (age 33) London, England
- Education: University of Leeds

Sport
- Country: United Kingdom
- Sport: Athletics
- Event: Long-distance running
- Club: Leeds City Athletics Club

Achievements and titles
- Personal bests: 3000 metres: 7:51.27 (Manchester 2021); Road; 10 km: 28:10 (Valencia 2025; Half marathon: 1:01.28 (Barcelona 2025); Marathon: 2:07.11 (Valencia 2025)

Philip William Sesemann (born 3 October 1992) is a British long-distance runner. Sesemann was the first British finisher at the 2021 London Marathon in his marathon debut, clocking 2:12:58 to finish in 7th place.

== Early life and education ==
Sesemann is originally from Bromley, Greater London, where he was a member of Blackheath and Bromley. He studied medicine at the University of Leeds, graduating in 2017, before working as a junior doctor at St James's University Hospital.

== Athletics career ==
=== Track career ===
From 2010 to 2020, Sesemann mostly competed in track events ranging from 800m to 5000m. Sesemann was famous throughout the athletics community for starting a track season in strong form and frequently falling apart and fading out by August, resulting in lackluster performances. Notable occasions were both at the Woodside stadium in Watford, where in 2017 he finished last over 1500m in a time of 3.57.27 and second last over the same distance in 2018 with a time of 3.51.17 In 2021, Sesemann represented Great Britain at the European Athletics Indoor Championships in Toruń, Poland, placing 5th in his heat of the 3000m, but not qualifying for the final.

=== Road Transition ===
On 3 April 2021, he raced the Podium 5k in Barrowford, UK, where he placed 2nd in 13:40, one second behind Tom Mortimer. On 22 August, he made his half marathon debut at The Big Half in London, placing 4th in 1:02:47. The race was won by Jake Smith. On 19 September, Sesemann won the Trafford 10k in Manchester in 29:29.

Sesemann made his marathon debut at the 2021 London Marathon, where he placed 7th in 2:12:58. He was 10th in the 2022 iteration, in a time of 2:12:10, and 8th in the 2023 race, where his time of 2:10:23 made him the second British finisher, behind training partner Emile Cairess, after out-kicking Mo Farah in the final 400m.

He achieved the qualifying time for the 2024 Summer Olympics marathon with 2:08:04 in Seville on 18 February 2024, and was subsequently named in the Great Britain team for the Games in Paris. In the marathon he finished in 46th place with a time of 2:13:08.

Sesemann was the fifth British finisher (16th overall) at the 2026 London Marathon, with a time of 2:08:41.
