= Evans Chebet =

Kenyan long-distance runner

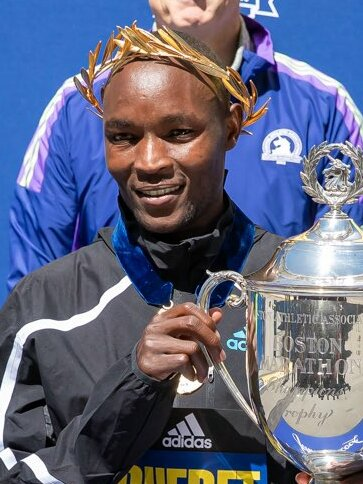
- Chebet after winning the 2022 Boston Marathon

Personal information
- Full name: Evans Kiplagat Chebet
- Nationality: Kenyan
- Born: 10 November 1988 (age 37) Kondabilet, Rift Valley Province, Kenya

Sport
- Country: Kenya
- Sport: Athletics
- Event(s): Half marathon, Marathon

Achievements and titles
- Personal best: Marathon: 2:03:00 (Valencia 2020)
Medal record
Men's athletics
Representing Kenya
World Marathon Majors
Gold medal – first place	2022 Boston	Marathon
Gold medal – first place	2022 New York	Marathon
Gold medal – first place	2023 Boston	Marathon
Silver medal – second place	2024 New York	Marathon
Bronze medal – third place	2016 Berlin	Marathon
Bronze medal – third place	2024 Boston	Marathon

Evans Kiplagat Chebet (born 10 November 1988) is a Kenyan long-distance runner who competes in road races. In 2022, he became the third man this century to win both the Boston Marathon and New York City Marathon. Chebet successfully defended his title at the 2023 Boston Marathon for his third consecutive World Marathon Major victory in a row. He finished third at the 2016 Berlin Marathon.

In September 2019, after finishing in the top six of every marathon he had finished, Chebet won his first international race, the Buenos Aires Marathon, in a time of 2:05:00. The year after, in March 2020, he won the Lake Biwa Marathon with 2:07:29. In December of the same year, he lowered his personal best by exactly two minutes and set a world lead when he won the 2020 Valencia Marathon in 2:03:00, kicking down Lawrence Cherono and winning by four seconds.

== Achievements ==
=== Road races ===
Representing Kenya
Year	Competition	Venue	Position	Event	Result
2011	Gargnano Dieci Miglia del Garda	Gargnano, Italy	2nd	10 miles	50:53
2012	Porto Half Marathon	Porto, Portugal	3rd	Half marathon	1:01:59
2013	JoongAng Seoul Marathon	Seoul, South Korea	6th	Marathon	2:11:26
2014	Prague Marathon	Prague, Czech Republic	2nd	Marathon	2:08:17
2014	JoongAng Seoul Marathon	Seoul, South Korea	2nd	Marathon	2:07:46
2015	Coamo San Blas Half Marathon	Coamo, Puerto Rico	7th	Half marathon	1:06:11
2015	Prague Marathon	Prague, Czech Republic	2nd	Marathon	2:08:50
2016	Seoul International Marathon	Seoul, South Korea	2nd	Marathon	2:05:33
2016	Berlin Marathon	Berlin, Germany	3rd	Marathon	2:05:31
2016	Ziwa 10 km	Ziwa, Kenya	8th	10 km	29:30
2017	Tokyo Marathon	Tokyo, Japan	4th	Marathon	2:06:42
2017	Tilburg Ten Miles	Tilburg, Netherlands	2nd	10 miles	45:05.4
2017	Valencia Marathon	Valencia, Spain	2nd	Marathon	2:05:30
2018	Boston Marathon	Boston, MA, United States	—	Marathon	DNF
2018	Ziwa 10 km	Ziwa, Kenya	17th	10 km	29:20
2019	Milano City Marathon	Milan, Italy	2nd	Marathon	2:07:22
2019	Buenos Aires Marathon	Buenos Aires, Argentina	1st	Marathon	2:05:00
2020	Lake Biwa Marathon	Ōtsu, Japan	1st	Marathon	2:07:29
2020	Valencia Marathon	Valencia, Spain	1st	Marathon	2:03:00
2021	London Marathon	London, United Kingdom	4th	Marathon	2:05:43
2022	Boston Marathon	Boston, MA, United States	1st	Marathon	2:06:51
2022	New York City Marathon	New York, NY, United States	1st	Marathon	2:08:41
2023	Boston Marathon	Boston, MA, United States	1st	Marathon	2:05:54
2024	Boston Marathon	Boston, MA, United States	3rd	Marathon	2:07:22
2024	New York City Marathon	New York, NY, United States	2nd	Marathon	2:07:45

=== Personal bests ===
- 10 kilometres – 29:39 (Boston, MA 2022)
- 10 miles – 45:06 (Tilburg 2017)
- Half marathon – 1:01:59 (Porto 2012)
- Marathon – 2:03:00 (Valencia 2020)
