= Ababel Yeshaneh =

Ethiopian long-distance runner

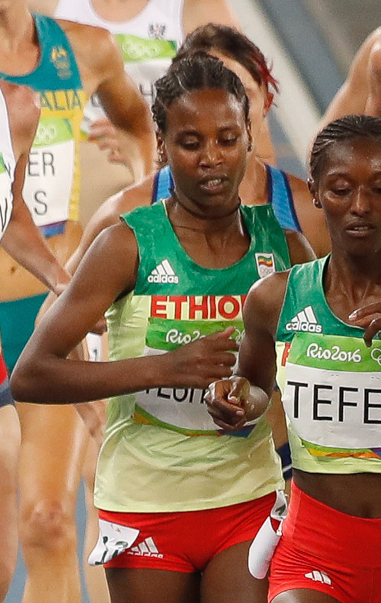
- Yeshaneh at the 2016 Rio Olympics

Personal information
- Nationality: Ethiopian
- Born: Ababel Yeshaneh Birhane; 22 July 1991 (age 34)
- Height: 165 cm (5 ft 5 in)
- Weight: 54 kg (119 lb)

Sport
- Sport: Athletics
- Events: Long-distance running, Cross country

Achievements and titles
- Personal bests: 3000 m: 8:49.45 (2014); 5000 m: 14:41.58 (2016); 10,000 m: 30:35.91 (2013); 10 km: 31:26 (2018); Half Marathon: 1:04:31 (2020); Marathon: 2:20:51 (2019)
Medal record
Women's athletics
Representing Ethiopia
World Marathon Majors
Silver medal – second place	2019 Chicago	Marathon
Silver medal – second place	2022 Boston	Marathon
Bronze medal – third place	2021 New York	Marathon
African Cross Country Championships
Silver medal – second place	2014 Kampala	Women's team

Ababel Yeshaneh Birhane (born 22 July 1991) is an Ethiopian long-distance runner who competes in track, road and cross country events. She represented her country in the 10,000 metres at the 2013 World Championships in Athletics, coming ninth, and ranked fifth in the world on time that year. She was a team silver medallist at the African Cross Country Championships in 2014 and finished 14th in the 5000 metres at the 2016 Olympic Games.

On 21 February 2020, she broke the world record in the half marathon, clocking 1:04:31 at the RAK Half-Marathon in Ras Al Khaimah, United Arab Emirates.

She has a marathon best of 2:20:51 set at the 2019 Chicago Marathon where she finished second.

== Career ==
While running in Ethiopia, she joined the Ethiopian Defense Forces sports club. She began to compete outside of Ethiopia in 2011, starting with a win at the Vadodara Half Marathon in India. She followed this with a win at the Stramilano in a best of 69:54 minutes, then had a runner-up finish at the Nice Half Marathon a few weeks later. She made her marathon debut that year, placing sixth at the Turin Marathon with a time of 2:34:36 hours in November. She ran sparingly in 2012, though she did set a 5000 metres track best of 15:17.05 minutes.

Ababel came third at the Milan Marathon in April 2013, setting a new best of 2:33:10 hours. However, it was on the track that she made her impact. At the Golden Spike Ostrava meeting she was part of the most competitive 10,000 metres race of the season and her time of 30:35.91 minutes for fourth eventually ranked her fifth in the world on time that year. The performances earned her a place on the Ethiopian team for the 2013 World Championships in Athletics, after world leader Meseret Defar decided to focus on the 5000 m. In the 10,000 m world final she was in the main pack until the halfway point before drifting back to ninth place overall on her international debut.

Her first international medal came at the 2014 African Cross Country Championships. She finished sixth in the women's race which brought her a silver medal as part of the Ethiopian women's team led by Tadelech Bekele. After this she returned to the roads, coming fourth at the Portugal Half Marathon. At the start of 2015 she won the half marathon section of the Ooredoo Marathon in Doha.

She competed in the women's marathon at the 2022 World Athletics Championships held in Eugene, Oregon, United States.

== International competitions ==
Representing Ethiopia
Year	Competition	Venue	Position	Event	Result
2013	World Championships	Moscow, Russia	9th	10,000 metres	32:02.09
2014	African Cross Country Championships	Kampala, Uganda	6th	Senior race	26:14.03
2014	African Cross Country Championships	Kampala, Uganda	2nd	Senior team	29 pts
2016	Olympic Games	Rio de Janeiro, Brazil	14th	5000 m	15:18.26
2020	World Half Marathon Championships	Gdynia, Poland	5th	Half marathon	1:05:41
2020	World Half Marathon Championships	Gdynia, Poland	1st	Team race	3:16:39
2022	World Championships	Eugene, OR, United States	6th	Marathon	DNF
World Marathon Majors
2019	Tokyo Marathon	Tokyo, Japan	6th	Marathon	2:24:02
2019	Chicago Marathon	Chicago, IL, United States	2nd	Marathon	2:20:51
2021	New York City Marathon	New York, NY, United States	3rd	Marathon	2:22:52
2022	Boston Marathon	Boston, MA, United States	2nd	Marathon	2:21:05

Records
Preceded by (Kenya) Joyciline Jepkosgei	Women's Half marathon World record holder 21 February 2020 – 4 April 2021	Succeeded by (Kenya) Ruth Chepng'etich
