= Brett Robinson (runner) =

Australian runner (born 1991)

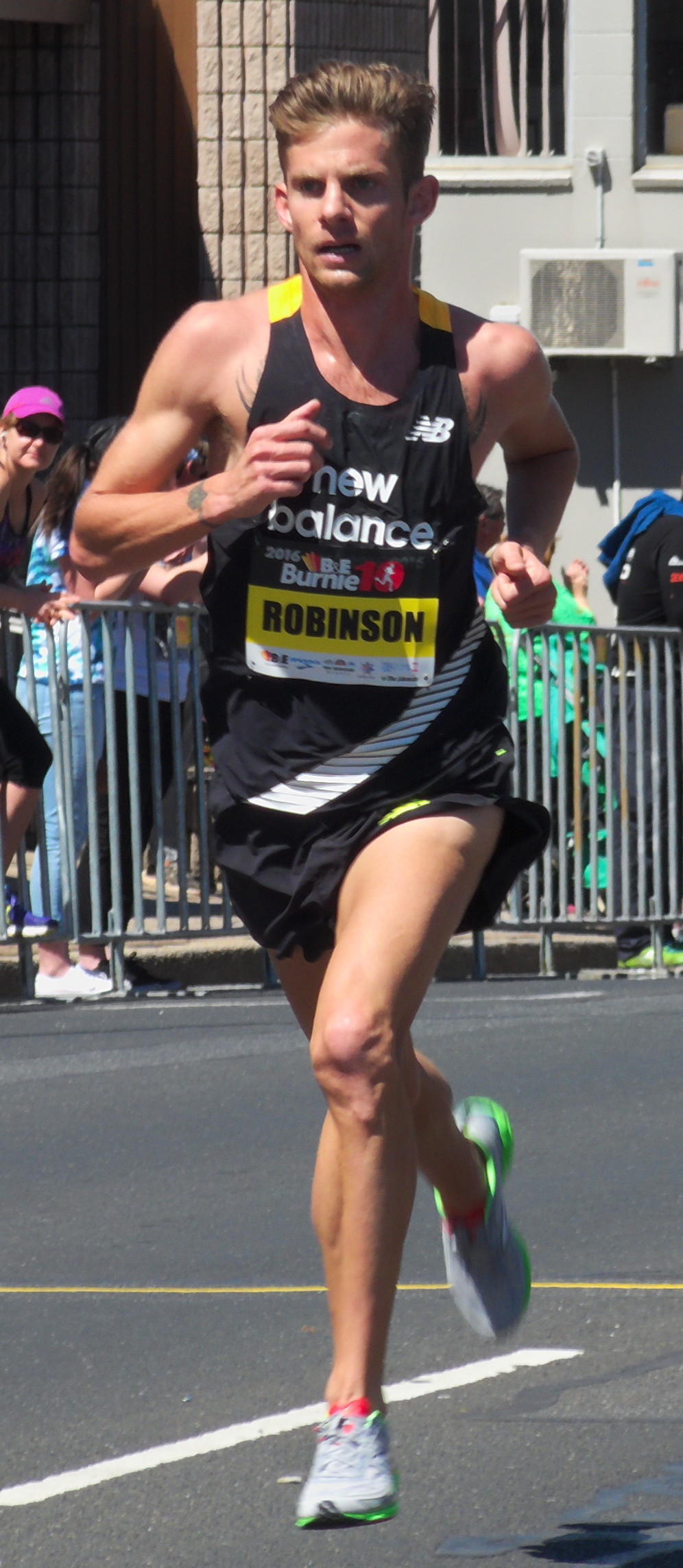
- Robinson winning the 2016 Burnie Ten

Personal information
- Nationality: Australian
- Born: 8 May 1991 (age 35) Canberra
- Height: 175 cm (5 ft 9 in)
- Weight: 59.9 kg (132 lb)

Sport
- Country: Australia
- Sport: Athletics
- Events: 5000 M, 1500 M, 3000 metres steeplechase, Half Marathon, Marathon

Achievements and titles
- Personal bests: Marathon: 2:16:31 (Fukuoka, 2022); Half Marathon: 59:57 NR (Marugame, 2020); 5000 M: 13:15.91 (Heusden-Zolder, 2018); 3000 M steeplechase: 8:52.47 (Melbourne, 2011); 1500 M: 3:38.94 (2012)

Brett Robinson (born 8 May 1991 in Canberra) is an Australian track and field athlete specializing in the 5000 metres who has competed in the World Championships. Robinson qualified for the Tokyo 2020 Olympics. He came 66th in the Men's marathon with a time of 2:24.04.

Robinson trains with 2020 Tokyo Olympic runner, Stewart McSweyn.

== Early years ==
Robinson grew up in Canberra and played soccer until he was 10 years old. In Year 6 at school his PE teacher who was a runner himself noticed that Robinson was pretty good at cross country and started taking him to races. Robinson went to nationals as an U13 and was placed 18th. In high school he got himself a coach. From then onwards, Robinson was always in the top ten.

Robinson was very good at soccer and had to then make the decision, athletics or soccer. When 17 years old he went to the World Cross Country and ran the junior event. Two years later he made the 1500m final at the World Junior Championships.

== Records and rankings ==
Robinson is a one-time silver medalist in the 3000 metres steeplechase and a one-time bronze medalist in the 10,000 metres in the Australian National Track & Field Championships. He is also a one-time silver medalist in the 1500 metres in the Australian National Junior Track & Field Championships. Robinson's current Australian all-time rankings are listed below.

Event	Ranking
1500 M	36th
3000 M	21st
5000 M	9th

== Competitions ==
=== Junior World Championships ===
Robinson competed at the 2010 World Junior Championships in Athletics in Moncton, Canada. He was selected and competed in the 1500 metres. Robinson competed in heat three and finished 3rd in a time of 3:43.67. This performance qualified him for the final. In the final Robinson finished 8th out of a field of twelve in a time of 3:44.06.

=== Senior World Championships ===
Robinson was selected to compete in the 2013 World Championships in Moscow in the 5000 metres. Robinson was in the first heat and finished 7th in a time of 13:25.38. This qualified him for the final where he finished 15th in a time of 14:03.77.

=== World Cross-Country Championships ===
Robinson has competed in two World Cross Country Championships. His first appearance was in 2009 in the junior race (8 km). He finished 46th out of 121 competitors. He made his second appearance in 2013. This time he competed in the senior race (12 km) and finished 29th out of 102 athletes.

== Statistics ==
=== Personal bests ===
Event	Performance	Venue	Date
800 M	1:50.36	Glendale, Australia	29 January 2011
1,500 M	3:38.94	Sydney, Australia	18 February 2012
Mile	3:58.5	Melbourne, Australia	16 February 2017
Beer Mile	32:58.3	Melbourne, Australia	25 December 2023
3,000 M	7:44.29	Boston, USA	14 February 2016
5,000 M	13:15.91	Ostrava, Czech Republic	27 June December 2013
10,000 M	27:51.51	San Juan Capistrano, USA	6 May 2022
3,000 M steeplechase	8:52.47	Melbourne, Australia	15 April 2011
Mile (road)	4:19.1	Christchurch, New Zealand	8 February 2016
5,000 M (road)	13:42.00	Carlsbad, USA	7 April 2013
10,000 M (road)	29:29.00	Burnie, Australia	23 October 2016
Half Marathon	59:57.00	Marugame, Japan	2 February 2020
Marathon	02:07:31	Fukuoka, Japan	4 December 2022
8 km (cross country)	25:47.00	Amman, Jordan	28 March 2009
12 km (cross country)	34:11.00	Bydgoszcz, Poland	24 March 2013

=== Seasonal bests by Year ===
View source data.

== Achievements ==
Year	Competition	Venue	Position	Event	Notes
Representing Australia
2009	World Cross Country Championships	Amman, Jordan	46th	8 km	25:47
2010	World Junior Championships	Moncton, New Brunswick, Canada	8th	1500 m	3:44.06
2013	World Championships	Moscow, Russia	15th	5000 m	14:03.77
2013	World Cross Country Championships	Bydgoszcz, Poland	29th	12 km	34:11
2015	World Championships	Beijing, China	25th (h)	5000 m	13:49.63
2016	World Indoor Championships	Portland, United States	11th	3000 m	8:11.11
2016	Olympic Games	Rio de Janeiro, Brazil	14th	5000 m	13:32.30
2021	Olympic Games	Sapporo, Japan	66th	Marathon	2:24:04
2022	2022 London Marathon	London, United Kingdom	8th	Marathon	2:09:52
2022	Fukuoka Marathon	Fukuoka, Japan	4th	Marathon	2:07:31
2023	2023 London Marathon	London, United Kingdom	7th	Marathon	2:10:19
2023	Sydney Marathon	Sydney, Australia	8th	Marathon	2:23:05
2023	Fukuoka Marathon	Fukuoka, Japan	7th	Marathon	2:08:29
2025	Sydney Marathon	Sydney, Australia	17th	Marathon	2:15:00
