= Alemu Megertu =

Ethiopian long-distance runner

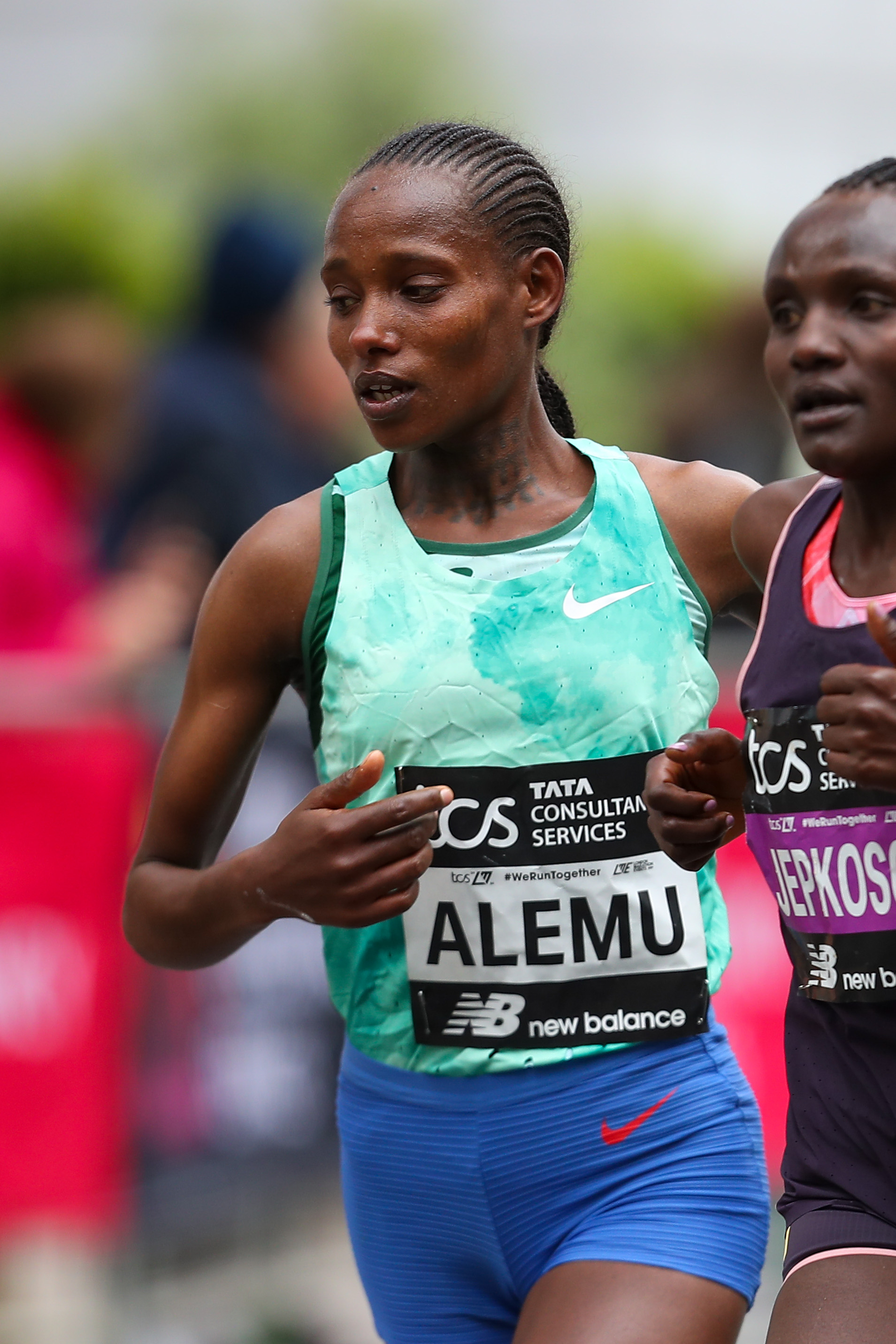
- Megertu in 2024

Personal information
- Nationality: Ethiopian
- Born: 12 October 1997 (age 28) Midakegn, Oromia, Ethiopia

Sport
- Country: Ethiopia
- Sport: Athletics
- Event: Long-distance running
Medal record
Women's athletics
Representing Ethiopia
World Marathon Majors
Silver medal – second place	2025 Chicago	Marathon
Silver medal – second place	2023 London	Marathon
Bronze medal – third place	2023 Chicago	Marathon
Bronze medal – third place	2022 London	Marathon

Alemu Megertu (born 12 October 1997) is an Ethiopian long-distance runner. She finished third and second at the 2022 and 2023 London Marathon respectively. She competed in the women's marathon at the 2024 Summer Olympics held in Paris, France.

== Career ==
In 2019, Alemu Megertu won the women's race at the Rome Marathon held in Italy. She also set a new course record of 2:22:52.

In 2020, she finished in fifth place in the women's race at the 2020 London Marathon in United Kingdom.

In February 2022, she won the Zurich Seville Marathon in Seville, Spain in a course record and personal best time of 2:18:51. Megertu secured her first medal at a World Marathon Major at the 2022 London Marathon in October, with a bronze in a new lifetime best of 2:18:32.

On 21 April 2024, she finished fourth in the London Marathon, in a new personal best of 2:16:34.

On 1 December 2024, she won the Valencia Marathon in a time of 2:16:49.

== Personal bests ==
- Half marathon – 1:06:43 (Copenhagen 2019)
- Marathon – 2:16:34 (London 2024)
