= 2022 Valencia Marathon =

42nd Valencia Marathon
- Logo of the race
- Venue: Valencia, Spain
- Date: December 4, 2022

Champions
- Men: Kelvin Kiptum (KEN) (2:01:53)
- Women: Amane Beriso (ETH) (2:14:58)

The 2022 Valencia Marathon was an Elite Platinum Label marathon race held in Valencia, Spain on December 4, 2022. It was the 42nd running of the race.

== Results ==
23-year old Kenyan Kelvin Kiptum, in his marathon debut, won the elite men's title by 2:01:53, and set a new course record.

Amane Beriso, who has won the elite women's title by 2:14:58, also smashed the previous course record. She is now ranked third in the women's marathon all-time top list.

Elite men's top 10 finishers
Place	Athlete	Nationality	Time
1st place, gold medalist(s)	Kelvin Kiptum	Kenya	2:01:53 MR
2nd place, silver medalist(s)	Gabriel Geay	Tanzania	2:03:00
3rd place, bronze medalist(s)	Alexander Mutiso	Kenya	2:03:29
4	Tamirat Tola	Ethiopia	2:03:40
5	Kaan Kigen Özbilen	Turkey	2:04:36
6	Chalu Deso	Ethiopia	2:04:56
7	Milkesa Mengesha	Ethiopia	2:05:29
8	Ronald Korir	Kenya	2:05:37
9	Philemon Kiplimo	Kenya	2:05:44
10	Goitom Kifle	Eritrea	2:06:09

Elite women's top 10 finishers
Place	Athlete	Nationality	Time
1st place, gold medalist(s)	Amane Beriso	Ethiopia	2:14:58 MR
2nd place, silver medalist(s)	Letesenbet Gidey	Ethiopia	2:16:49
3rd place, bronze medalist(s)	Sheila Chepkirui	Kenya	2:17:29
4	Tadu Teshome	Ethiopia	2:17:36
5	Fancy Chemutai	Kenya	2:18:11
6	Tiruye Mesfin	Ethiopia	2:18:47
7	Tigist Girma	Ethiopia	2:18:52
8	Etagegne Woldu	Ethiopia	2:20:03
9	Dolshi Tesfu	Eritrea	2:20:40
10	Majida Maayouf	Morocco	2:21:01
