= Judith Korir =

Kenyan athlete

Personal information
- Full name: Judith Jeptum Korir
- Nationality: Kenyan
- Born: 12 December 1995 (age 30)

Sport
- Sport: Athletics
- Event: Marathon
Medal record
Women's athletics
Representing Kenya
World Championships
Silver medal – second place	2022 Eugene	Marathon

Judith Jeptum Korir (born 12 December 1995) is a Kenyan marathon runner.

Korir won the 2021 Abu Dhabi Marathon in a time of 2:22:30. She secured victory at the 2022 Paris Marathon, setting a new course record and a new personal best time of 2:19:48.

Korir was selected by Kenya to run in the 2022 World Athletics Championships – Women's marathon in which she finished second to earn the silver medal in a new personal best time of 2:18:20.

Korir finished in sixth place at the 2023 London Marathon.

== Personal bests ==
- 10 kilometres – 33:02 (Eldoret 2019)
- Half marathon – 1:05:28 (Ras Al Khaimah 2022)
- Marathon – 2:18:20 (Eugene, OR 2022)
