= Leul Gebresilase =

Ethiopian long-distance runner

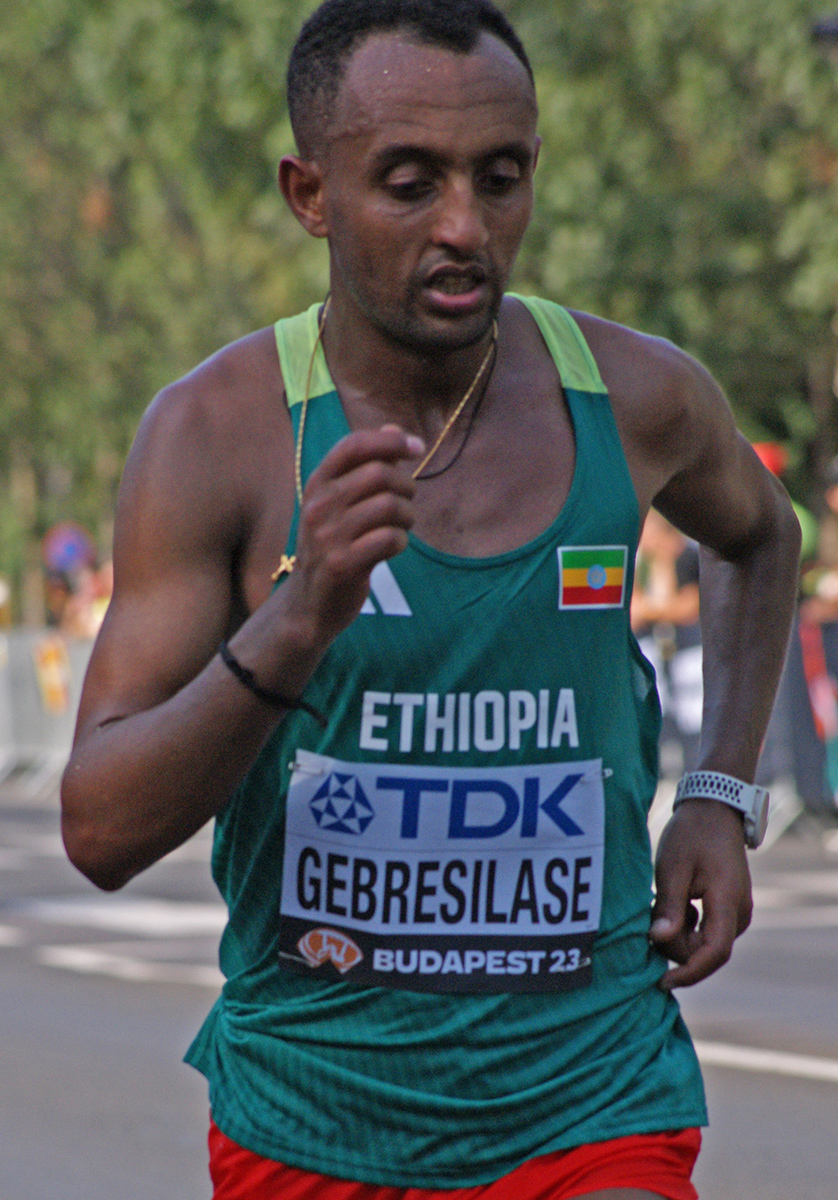
- Gebresilase (center in green) at the 2023 World Athletics Championships

Personal information
- Nationality: Ethiopian
- Born: 20 September 1992 (age 33)

Sport
- Country: Ethiopia
- Sport: Athletics
- Event: Long-distance running
Medal record
Men's athletics
Representing Ethiopia
World Championships
Bronze medal – third place	2023 Budapest	Marathon
African Games
Silver medal – second place	2015 Brazzaville	5000 m
World Marathon Majors
Silver medal – second place	2022 London	Marathon

Leul Gebresilase (born 20 September 1992) is an Ethiopian long-distance runner. He won the silver medal at the 2022 London Marathon.

In 2015, Gebresilase earned silver in the 5000 metres at the African Games held in Brazzaville, Congo with a time of 13:22.13.

Two year later, he came second at the Valencia Half Marathon.

In 2018, he competed in the men's half marathon at the World Half Marathon Championships held in Valencia, Spain. He finished in 10th place.

The following year, he finished in 8th place in the men's race at the 2019 London Marathon held in London, United Kingdom. Also in 2019 in December, Gebresilase won Valencia Marathon.

He competed in the men's race at the 2020 World Athletics Half Marathon Championships held in Gdynia, Poland, finishing 10th.

In 2021, Gebresilase placed third at the Amsterdam Marathon.

In April 2022, he finished second at the Rotterdam Marathon to repeat this achievement in October at the 2022 London Marathon, his first medal from a World Marathon Major.

== Personal bests ==
- 5000 metres – 13:13.88 (Huelva 2016)
- 10,000 metres – 27:19.71 (Herzogenaurach 2016)
- 10 kilometres – 28:12 (Rennes 2015)
- 20 kilometres – 58:30 (Tachikawa 2013)
- Half marathon – 59:18 (Valencia 2017)
- Marathon – 2:04:02 (Dubai 2018)
