= 2022 Boston Marathon =

Footrace in Boston, Massachusetts, USA

- Venue: Boston, Massachusetts, United States
- Date: April 18, 2022

Champions
- Men: Evans Chebet (2:06:51)
- Women: Peres Jepchirchir (2:21:01)
- Wheelchair men: Daniel Romanchuk (1:26:58)
- Wheelchair women: Manuela Schär (1:41:08)

The 2022 Boston Marathon was a marathon race held in Boston, Massachusetts, on April 18, 2022. It was the 126th official running of the race, and 124th time it was run on course (excluding the virtual event of 2020, and the ekiden of 1918). The field was limited to 30,000 runners.

== Background ==
The marathon returned to its traditional Patriots' Day schedule for the first time since 2019. All participants were required to be fully vaccinated against COVID-19.

Lawrence Cherono and Benson Kipruto, both from Kenya, were among the elite runners expected to compete.

On April 6, race organizers announced that runners residing in Russia or Belarus would not be allowed to participate, due to the Russian invasion of Ukraine. That decision subsequently drew criticism from an editorial in The Boston Globe.

== Results ==
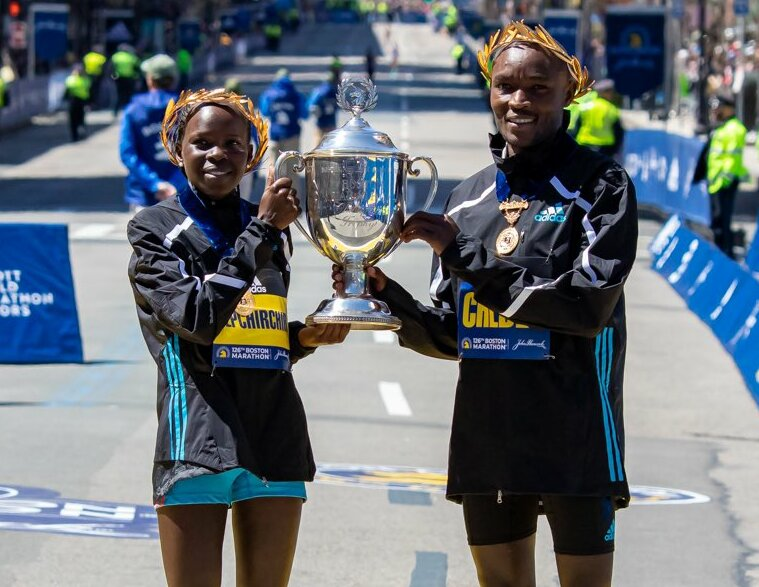
Women's winner Peres Jepchirchir and men's winner Evans Chebet pose together after the race

The elite men's and women's races were won by Kenyans Evans Chebet and Peres Jepchirchir, respectively. Wheelchair races were won by Daniel Romanchuk of the US (men) and Manuela Schär of Switzerland (women). Wheelchair racer Marcel Hug withdrew hours before the race started, for an unknown reason.

Olympic bronze medalist Molly Seidel, who had a hip impingement, dropped out of the race at around 16 miles (26 km) due to a hip injury. This was the first time she ran in the Boston Marathon.

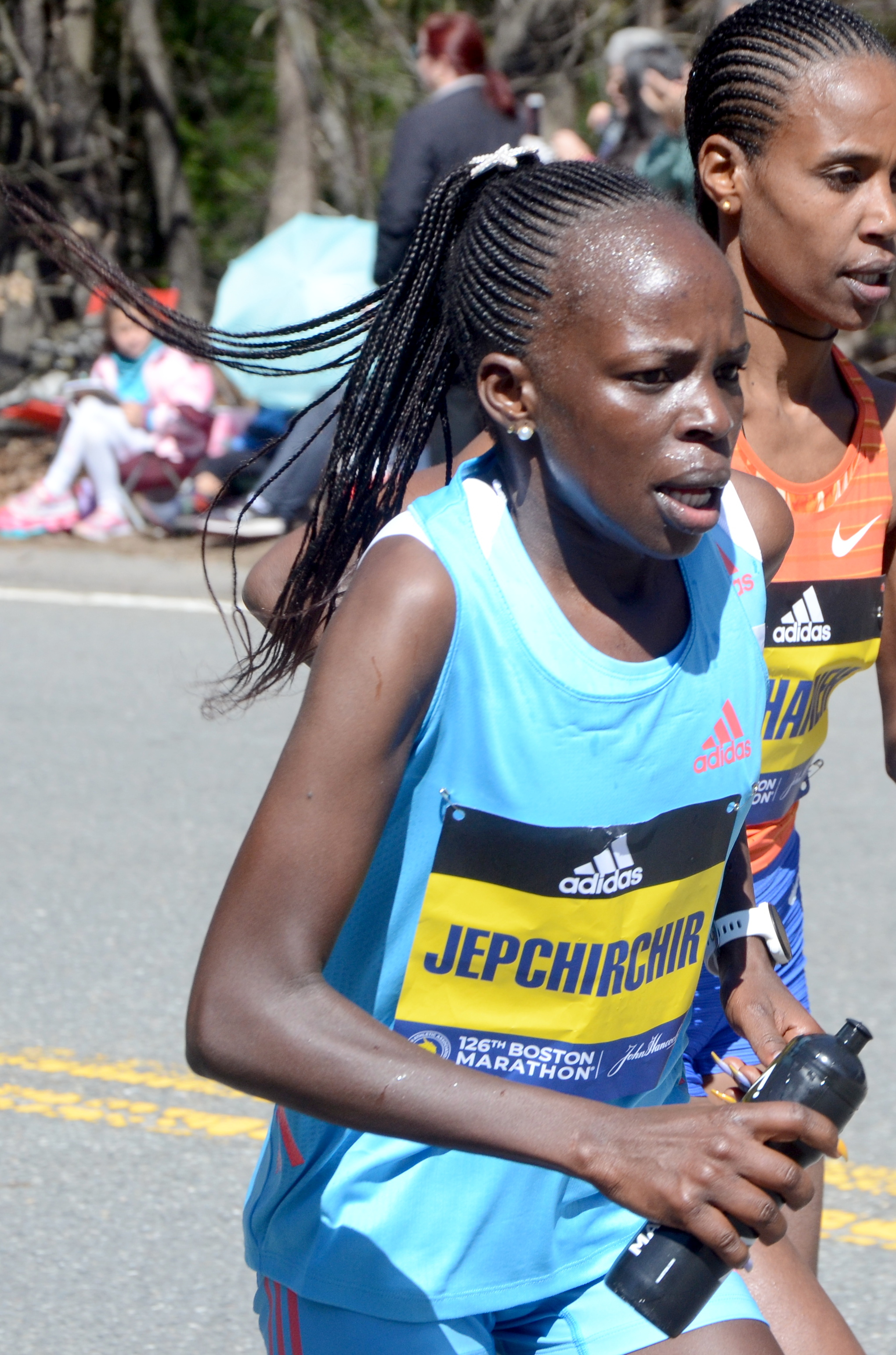
Peres Jepchirchir, elite women's winner, near the halfway point of the race

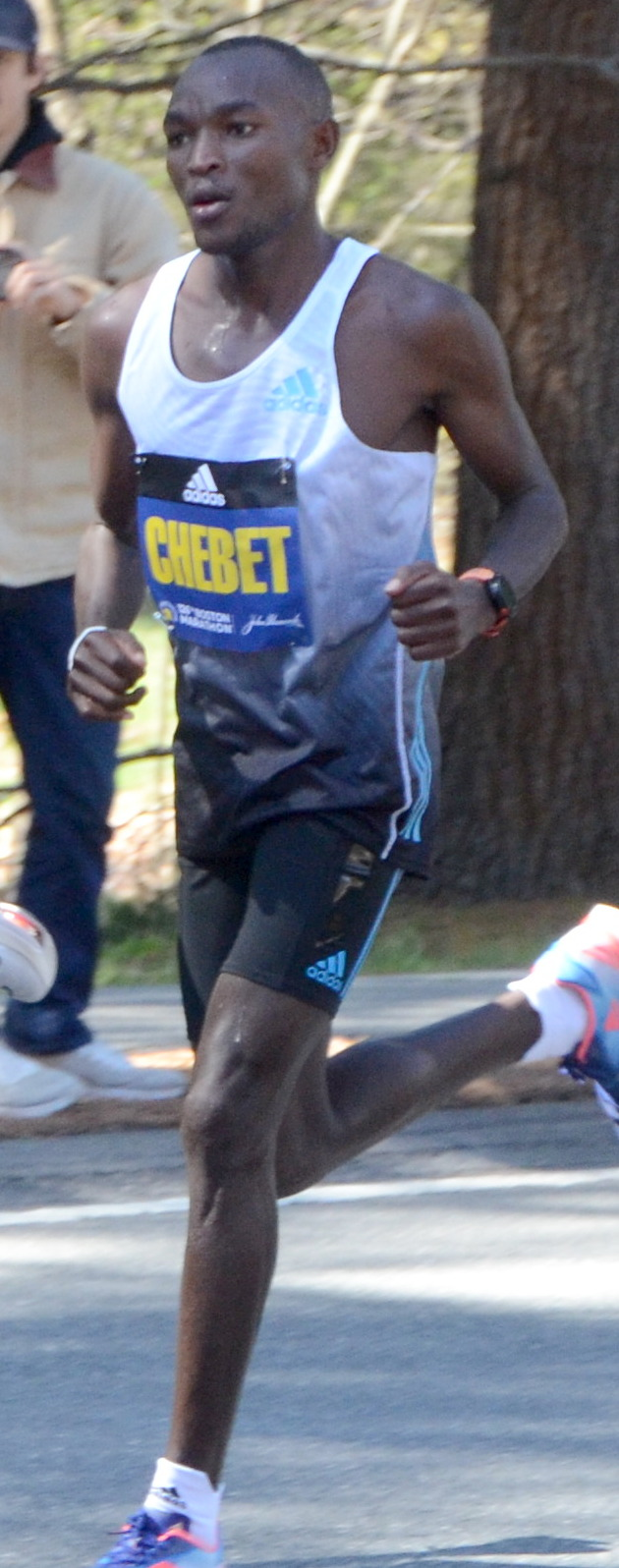
Evans Chebet, elite men's winner, during the race

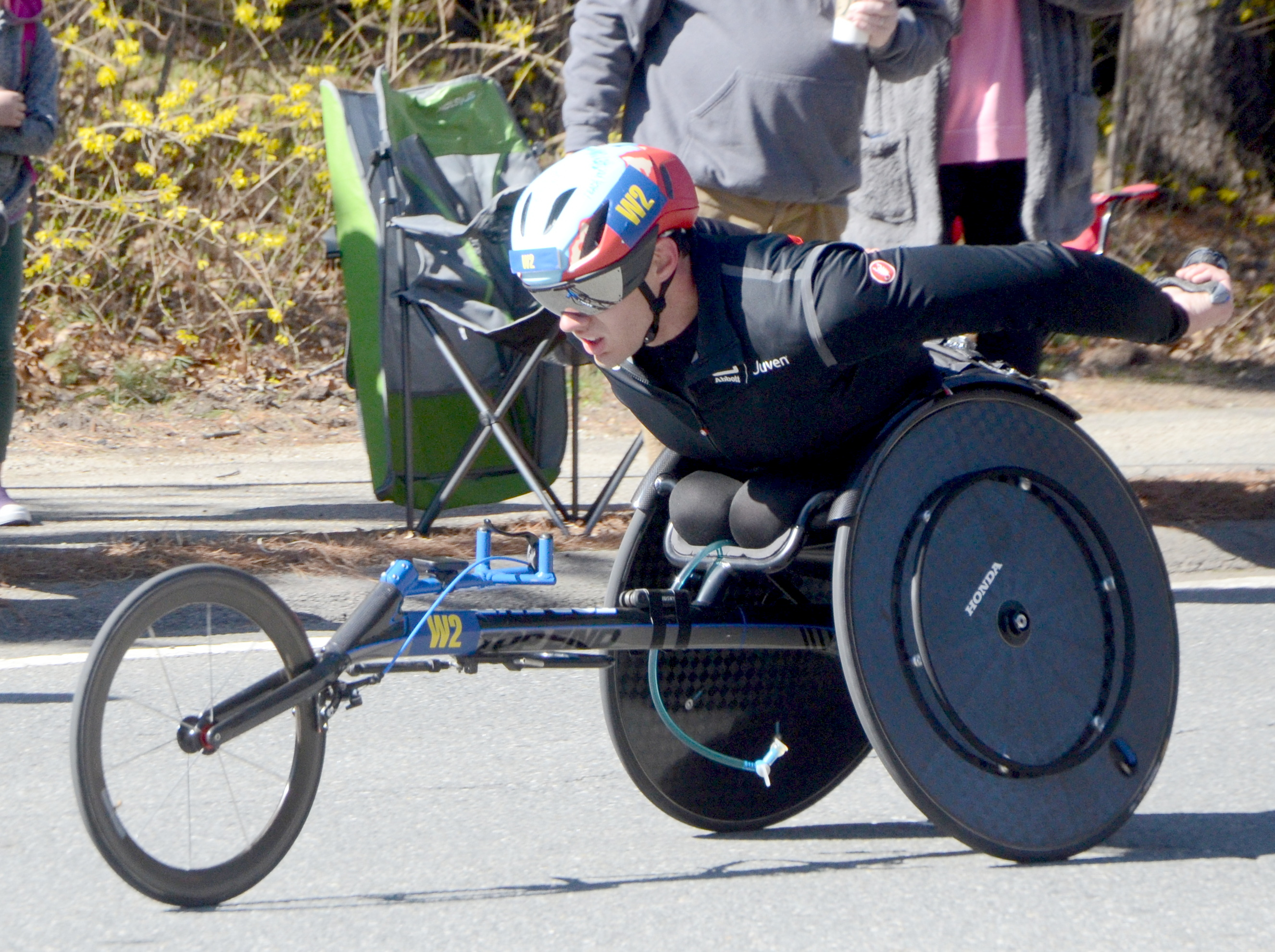
Daniel Romanchuk, men's wheelchair winner, near the halfway point

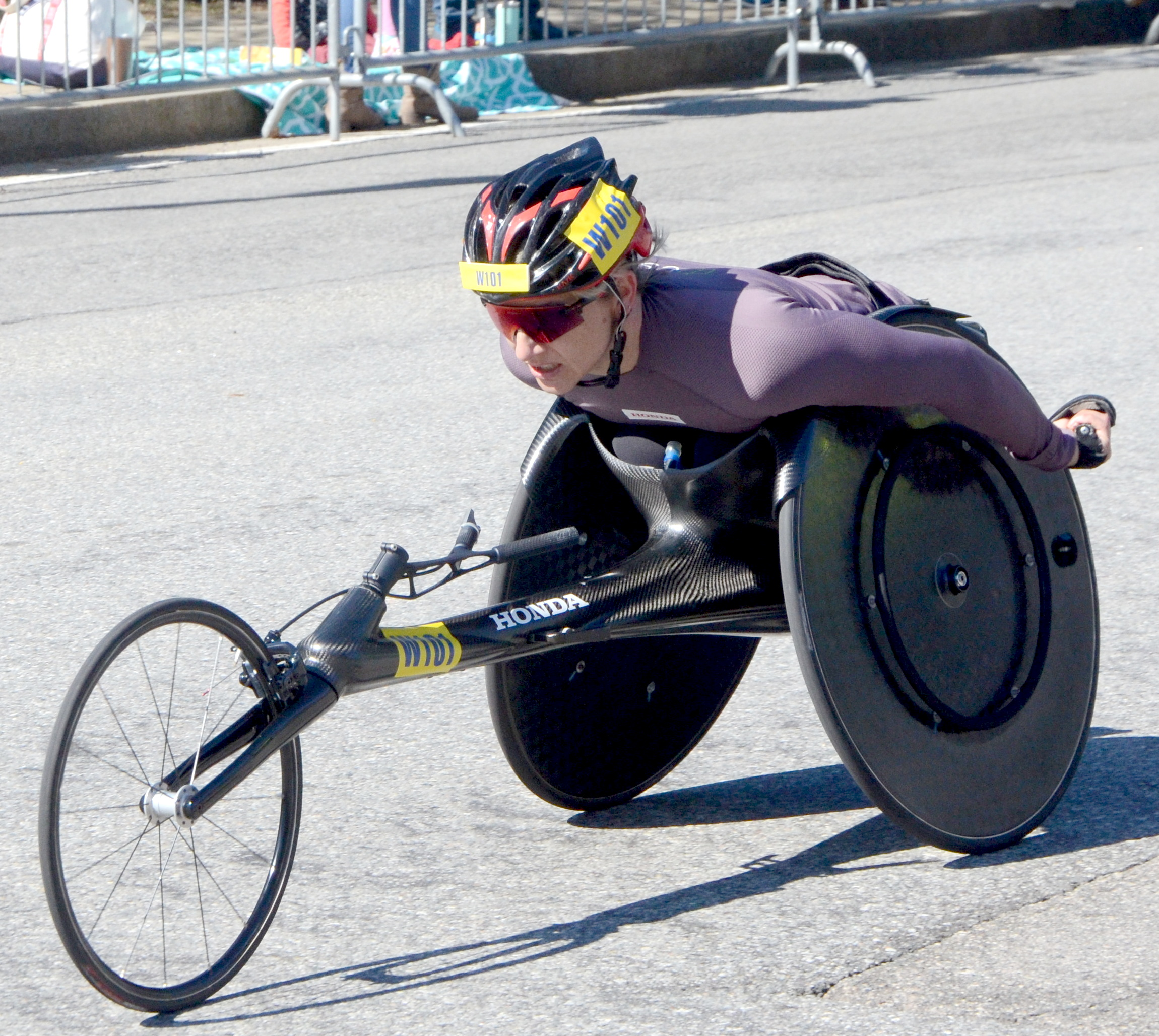
Manuela Schär, women's wheelchair winner, during the race

=== Men ===
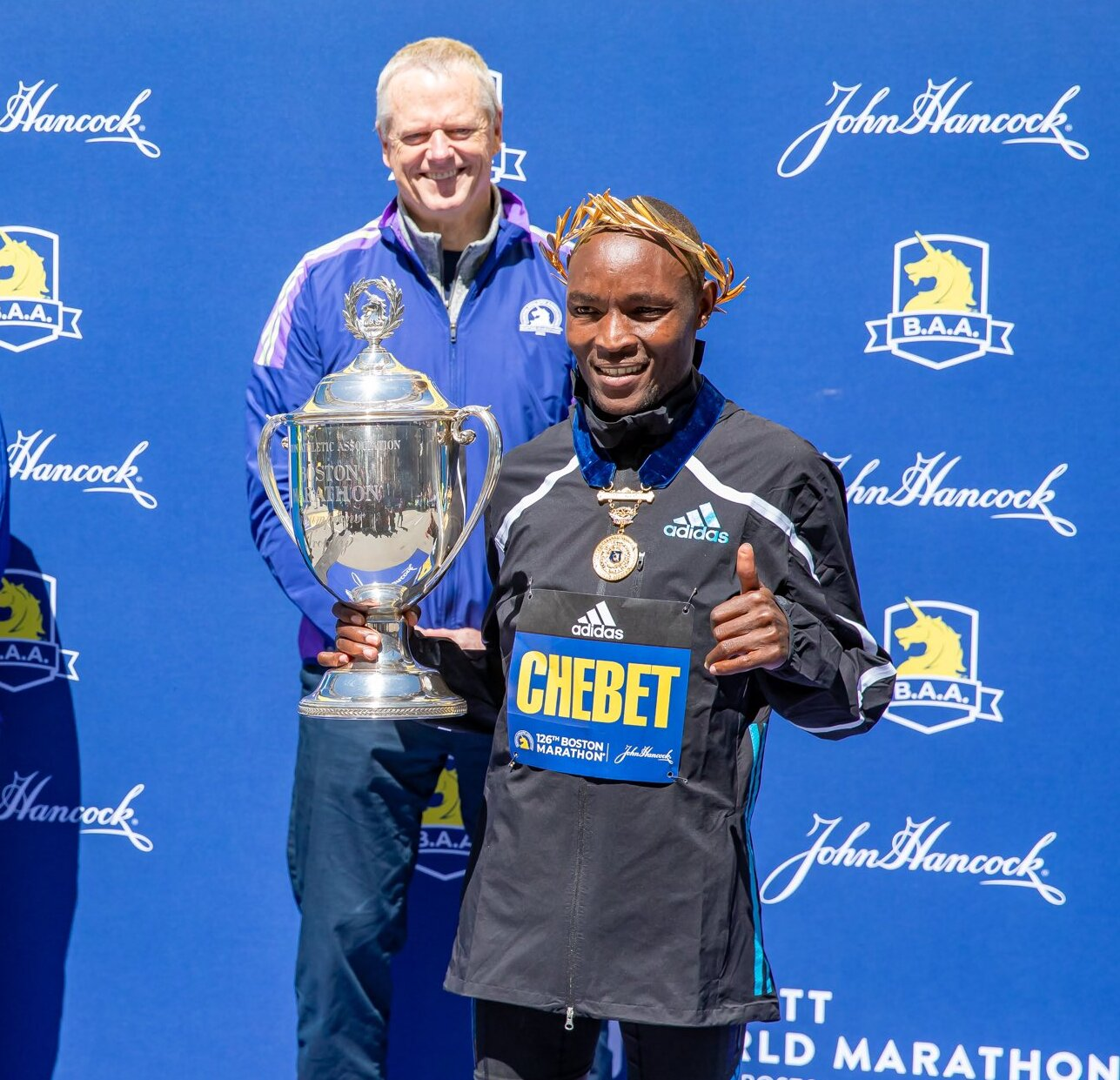
Men's winner Evans Chebet (right) with Massachusetts Governor Charlie Baker

Elite men's top 30 finishers
Place	Athlete	Nationality	Time
1st place, gold medalist(s)	Evans Chebet	Kenya	2:06:51
2nd place, silver medalist(s)	Lawrence Cherono	Kenya	2:07:21
3rd place, bronze medalist(s)	Benson Kipruto	Kenya	2:07:27
4	Gabriel Geay	Tanzania	2:07:53
5	Eric Kiptanui	Kenya	2:08:47
6	Albert Korir	Kenya	2:08:50
7	Scott Fauble	United States	2:08:52
8	Jemal Yimer	Ethiopia	2:08:58
9	Elkanah Kibet	United States	2:09:07
10	Kinde Atanaw	Ethiopia	2:09:16
11	Lemi Berhanu	Ethiopia	2:09:43
12	Bethwel Yegon	Kenya	2:09:44
13	CJ Albertson	United States	2:10:23
14	Matthew McDonald	United States	2:10:35
15	Trevor Hofbauer	Canada	2:10:52
16	Reed Fischer	United States	2:10:54
17	Mick Iacofano	United States	2:11:48
18	Geoffrey Kamworor	Kenya	2:11:49
19	Colin Bennie	United States	2:12:08
20	Yuki Kawauchi	Japan	2:12:55
21	Mike Sayenko	United States	2:13:46
22	Jerrell Mock	United States	2:14:10
23	Jonas Hampton	United States	2:14:40
24	Ian Butler	United States	2:14:48
25	Paul Hogan	United States	2:15:08
26	Jared Ward	United States	2:15:24
27	Matthew Llano	United States	2:16:39
28	Benjamin Schneiderman	United States	2:18:36
29	Nico Montanez	United States	2:19:23
30	Tyler Pence	United States	2:19:39

=== Women ===
Elite women's top 30 finishers
Place	Athlete	Nationality	Time
1st place, gold medalist(s)	Peres Jepchirchir	Kenya	2:21:01
2nd place, silver medalist(s)	Ababel Yeshaneh	Ethiopia	2:21:05
3rd place, bronze medalist(s)	Mary Ngugi	Kenya	2:21:32
4	Edna Kiplagat	Kenya	2:21:40
5	Monicah Ngige	Kenya	2:22:13
6	Viola Cheptoo	Kenya	2:23:47
7	Joyciline Jepkosgei	Kenya	2:24:43
8	Degitu Azimeraw	Ethiopia	2:25:23
9	Charlotte Purdue	United Kingdom	2:25:26
10	Nell Rojas	United States	2:25:57
11	Malindi Elmore	Canada	2:27:58
12	Stephanie Rothstein-Bruce	United States	2:28:02
13	Desiree Linden	United States	2:28:47
14	Dakotah Lindwurm	United States	2:29:55
15	Bria Wetsch	United States	2:30:42
16	Elaina Tabb	United States	2:31:34
17	Maegan Krifchin	United States	2:31:53
18	Kathy Derks	United States	2:34:54
19	Natasha Wodak	Canada	2:35:08
20	Angie Orjuela	Colombia	2:35:17
21	Sara Vaughn	United States	2:36:27
22	Aisling Cuffe	United States	2:37:23
23	Annmarie Tuxbury	United States	2:38:15
24	Kate Bazeley	Canada	2:38:26
25	Kayla Lampe	United States	2:38:38
26	Kaylee Flanagan	United States	2:39:26
27	Ashlee Powers	United States	2:39:59
28	Caitlin Phillips	United States	2:40:09
29	Kate Sanborn	United States	2:40:16
30	Katrina Morrissey	United States	2:40:19

=== Wheelchair men ===
Wheelchair men's top 3 finishers
Position	Athlete	Nationality	Time
1st place, gold medalist(s)	Daniel Romanchuk	United States	01:26:58
2nd place, silver medalist(s)	Aaron Pike	United States	01:32:49
3rd place, bronze medalist(s)	Johnboy Smith	United Kingdom	01:32:55

=== Wheelchair women ===
Wheelchair women's top 3 finishers
Position	Athlete	Nationality	Time
1st place, gold medalist(s)	Manuela Schär	Switzerland	01:41:08
2nd place, silver medalist(s)	Susannah Scaroni	United States	01:46:20
3rd place, bronze medalist(s)	Madison De Rozario	Australia	01:52:48
