= Valencia Marathon =

Annual race in Spain held since 1981

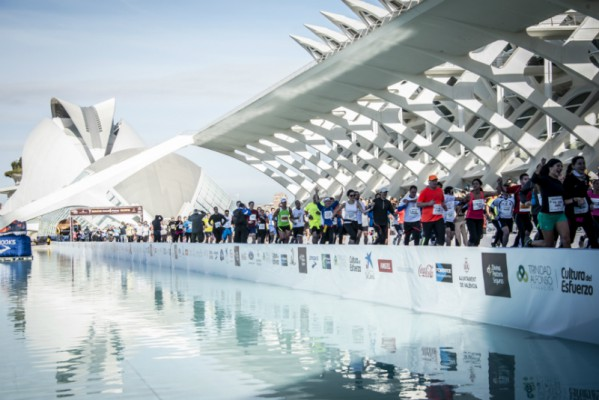
- Finish area at Museu de les Ciències Príncipe Felipe
- Date: Early December
- Location: Valencia, Spain
- Event type: Road
- World Athletics Cat.: Label Platinium
- Distance: Marathon, 10K run
- Primary sponsor: EDP
- Established: 1981 (45 years ago)
- Course records: Men: 2:01:48 (2023) (Ethiopia) Sisay Lemma; Women: 2:14:00 (2025) (Kenya) Joyciline Jepkosgei
- Website: Valencia Marathon
- Participants: 30,000 (2022); 134 finishers (2020); 21,225 (2019); 19,504 (2018)

The Valencia Marathon (Catalan: Marató de València; also known as Marathon Valencia Trinidad Alfonso EDP for sponsorship reasons) is an annual marathon road running event hosted by Valencia, Spain, since 1981. It is categorized as a Platinum Label Road Race by World Athletics. The race is organised by the Valencian sports club SD Correcaminos, which also organises the annual Valencia Half Marathon.

== History ==
The marathon was first held in 1981 as a popular race known as the Marató Popular de València.

From 2011 to 2014, the marathon was known as the Divina Pastora Valencia Marathon.

In 2015, the marathon was known as the Valencia Trinidad Alfonso Marathon.

On 7 September 2020, the race organizer announced the cancellation of the 2020 in-person edition of the mass race due to the coronavirus pandemic, with all registrants given the option of running the race virtually, transferring their entry to 2021, or obtaining a full refund. Three days later, on 10 September, the organizer announced that an "Elite Edition" of the race would be held on 6 December, and that the event would also include a half marathon race that year. Both races would use a course very similar to that used in the Valencia Half Marathon, with marathoners running two laps of the course. (Note: The marathon normally consisted of only one loop, and traversed areas of the city that the half marathon did not.) On the day of the race, four half marathon runners broke the previous world record of 58:01, with Kenyan Kibiwott Kandie setting a new world record of 57:32. In addition, four marathon runners broke the previous course record of 2:03:51, with Kenyan Evans Chebet setting a new course record of 2:03:00, the sixth-fastest marathon at the time, while Kenyan Peres Jepchirchir also broke the previous course record of 2:18:30 with a new course record of 2:17:16, the fifth-fastest marathon at the time. (Note: Jepchirchir also broke her previous personal best of 2:23:50 by over six minutes.)

In 2023, Sisay Lemma of Ethiopia broke the course record with a time of 2:01:48. The previous record was held by Kelvin Kiptum of Kenya.

== Course ==
External images
- Course map of full marathon in 2019
- Course map of full marathon in 2020
- Course map of half marathon in 2020

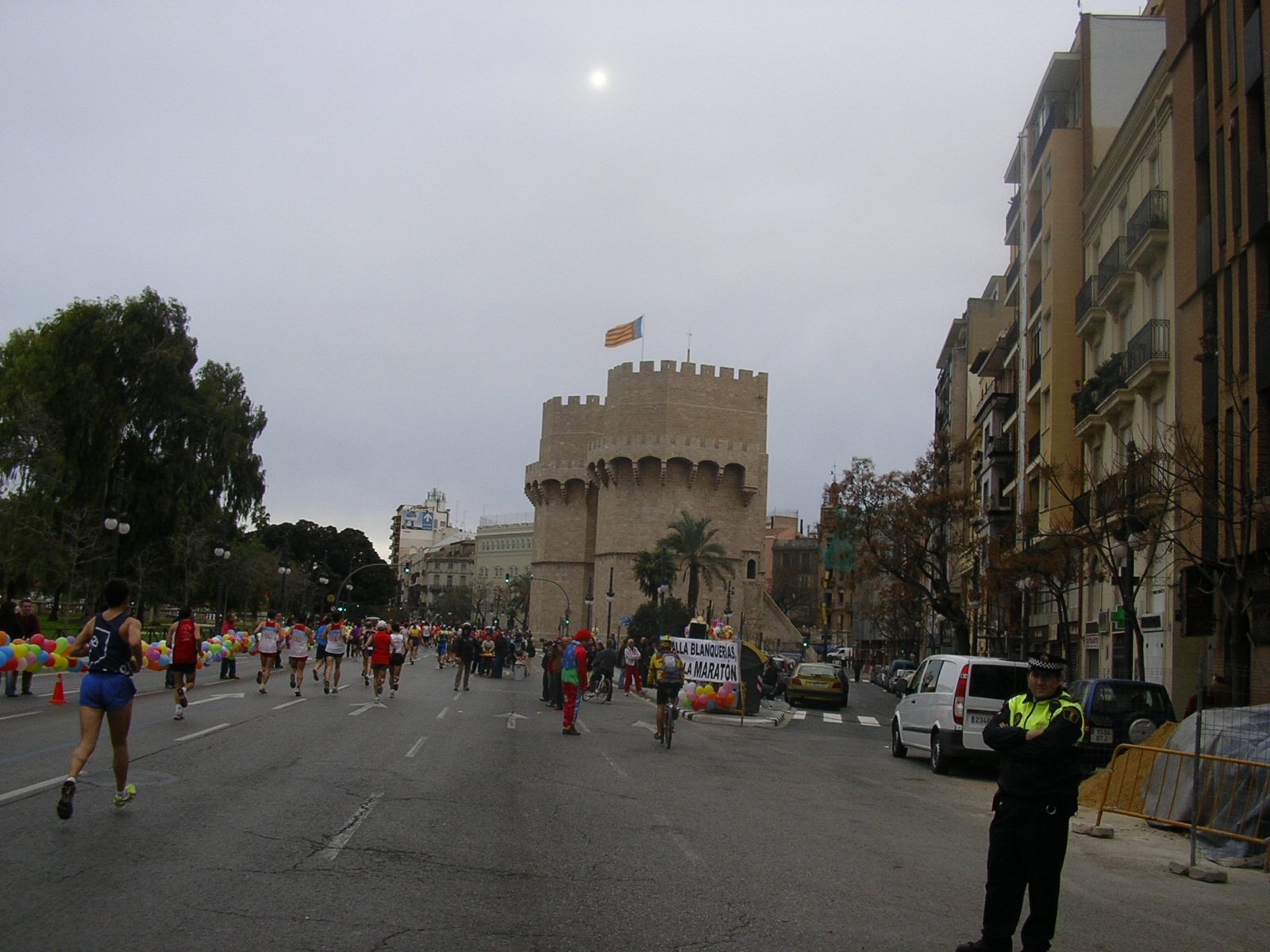
Passing Torres de Serranos in 2006

The marathon runs on roughly a loop course that begins at Pont de Montolivet and ends next to the nearby Museu de les Ciències Príncipe Felipe.

The course for the elite-only races in 2020 during the coronavirus pandemic used a modified version of the Valencia Half Marathon course, with marathon runners running two laps.

== Winners ==
Key:

Course record (in bold)
National championship race

=== Marathon ===
Ed.	Year	Men's winner	Time	Women's winner	Time	Rf.
1	1981	Teodoro Pérez (ESP)	2:26:57	Nuria de Miguel (ESP)	3:20:50	
2	1982	Antonio Castells (ESP)	2:28:19	Nuria de Miguel (ESP)	3:29:26	
3	1983	Teodoro Pérez (ESP)	2:20:58	María Victoria García (ESP)	3:14:43	
4	1984	Vicente Antón (ESP)	2:14:01	Juana María Pablos (ESP)	2:57:28	
5	1985	Ramiro Matamoros (ESP)	2:16:56	Nuria de Miguel (ESP)	3:03:49	
6	1986	Paweł Lorens (POL)	2:16:31	Małgorzata Szumińska (POL)	2:46:31	
7	1987	Mirosław Bugaj (POL)	2:19:06	Ewa Wrzosek (POL)	2:46:54	
8	1988	Alfonso Abellán (ESP)	2:14:42	María Luisa Irízar (ESP)	2:41:03	
9	1989	Mirosław Dzienisik (POL)	2:19:09	Elisenda Pucurull (ESP)	2:46:19	
10	1990	Radamés González (CUB)	2:15:57	Elisenda Pucurull (ESP)	2:43:36	
11	1991	Sergey Prokhorov (URS)	2:17:15	Elisenda Pucurull (ESP)	2:43:14	
12	1992	Cephas Matafi (ZIM)	2:15:14	Yekaterina Khramenkova (BLR)	2:36:03	
13	1993	Leonid Shvetsov (RUS)	2:15:04	Mónica Pont (ESP)	2:35:30	
14	1994	Yevgeniy Zarakovskiy (RUS)	2:16:20	Zinaida Semenova (RUS)	2:34:08	
15	1995	Lars Andervang (SWE)	2:19:20	Valentina Lyakhova (RUS)	2:46:34	
16	1996	Eduardo Alcaina (ESP)	2:17:53	Zinaida Semenova (RUS)	2:43:05	
17	1997	Eduardo Alcaina (ESP)	2:18:07	Faustina María Ramos (ESP)	2:53:35	
18	1998	Samuel Okemwa (KEN)	2:19:51	Esther Pedrosa (ESP)	2:44:30	
19	1999	Jackton Odhiambo (KEN)	2:15:35	Olga Sokolova (RUS)	2:42:27	
20	2000	Thomas Magut (KEN)	2:15:05	María Luisa Muñoz (ESP)	2:32:34	
21	2001	John Miaka (KEN)	2:13:46	María Luisa Larraga (ESP)	2:30:10	
22	2002	Samuel Tangus (KEN)	2:13:05	María Abel (ESP)	2:28:08	
23	2003	Samuel Tangus (KEN)	2:14:43	Mulu Seboka (ETH)	2:46:33	
24	2004	Eric Kiptum (KEN)	2:14:32	Živilė Balčiūnaitė (LTU)	2:41:05	
25	2005	Rachid Ghanmouni (MAR)	2:14:03	Nadezhda Zolotareva (RUS)	2:43:24	
26	2006	Derba Bedade (ETH)	2:14:23	Teresa Gracia (ESP)	2:57:02	
27	2007	Samson Loywapet (KEN)	2:12:04	Alemu Zinash (ETH)	2:39:08	
28	2008	Philip Manyim (KEN)	2:11:29	María José Pueyo (ESP)	2:32:22	
29	2009	Andrés Micó (ESP)	2:26:43	Maxine McKinnon (GBR)	2:50:46	
30	2010	David Njagi (KEN)	2:09:45	Gladys Chebet (KEN)	2:42:06	
31	2011	Isaiah Kiplagat (KEN)	2:07:59	Marshet Jimma (ETH)	2:34:23	
32	2012	Luka Kanda (KEN)	2:08:14	Birhane Dibaba (ETH)	2:29:22	
33	2013	Felix Keny (KEN)	2:07:14	Azalech Masresha (ETH)	2:27:01	
34	2014	Jacob Kendagor (KEN)	2:08:39	Beata Naigambo (NAM)	2:30:54	
35	2015	John Mwangangi (KEN)	2:06:13	Beata Naigambo (NAM)	2:26:57	
36	2016	Victor Kipchirchir (KEN)	2:07:36	Valary Aiyabei (KEN)	2:24:46	
37	2017	Sammy Kitwara (KEN)	2:05:15	Aberu Zennebe (ETH)	2:26:17	
38	2018	Leul Gebresilase (ETH)	2:04:31	Ashete Bekere (ETH)	2:21:14	
39	2019	Kinde Atanaw (ETH)	2:03:51	Roza Dereje (ETH)	2:18:30	
40	2020	Evans Chebet (KEN)	2:03:00	Peres Jepchirchir (KEN)	2:17:16	
41	2021	Lawrence Cherono (KEN)	2:05:11	Nancy Jelagat (KEN)	2:19:30	
42	2022	Kelvin Kiptum (KEN)	2:01:53	Amane Beriso (ETH)	2:14:58	
43	2023	Sisay Lemma (ETH)	**2:01:48**	Worknesh Degefa (ETH)	2:15:51	
44	2024	Sabastian Sawe (KEN)	2:02:05	Alemu Megertu (ETH)	2:16:49	
45	2025	John Korir (KEN)	2:02:25	Joyciline Jepkosgei (KEN)	**2:14:00**	

=== Half marathon ===
The 40th edition of the marathon, held during the coronavirus pandemic, was an elite-only event that also included a half marathon race.

Year	Male Winner	Time	Female Winner	Time	Rf.
2020	Kibiwott Kandie (KEN)	57:32 WR	Genzebe Dibaba (ETH)	1:05:18	

Sources:
- Previous editions results
- https://arrs.run/HP_ValMa.htm

=== Wins by country ===
Country	Men's race	Women's race	Total
Kenya	22	5	27
Spain	9	17	26
Ethiopia	4	11	15
Russia	3	5	8
Poland	3	2	5
Namibia	0	2	2
Cuba	1	0	1
Zimbabwe	1	0	1
Sweden	1	0	1
Morocco	1	0	1
Belarus	0	1	1
Lithuania	0	1	1
United Kingdom	0	1	1
