= Helen Bekele Tola =

Ethiopian-Swiss long-distance runner

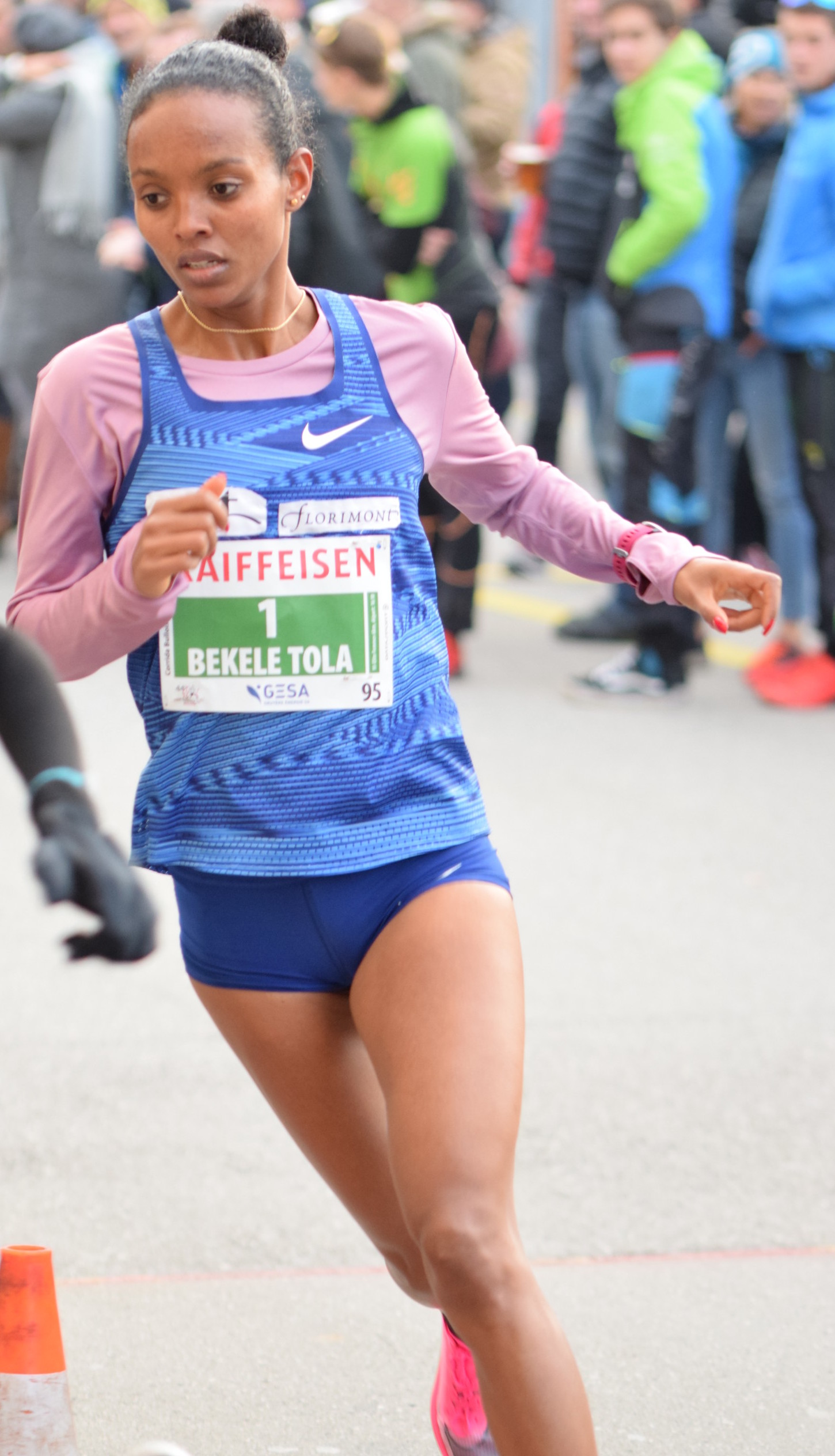
- Tola during the 2019 Corrida bulloise

Personal information
- Born: 21 November 1994 (age 31) Ethiopia

Sport
- Sport: Athletics
Medal record
Marathon
World Marathon Majors
Silver medal – second place	2019 Tokyo	Marathon
Bronze medal – third place	2021 Berlin	Marathon

Helen Bekele Tola (born 21 November 1994) is an Ethiopian–Swiss long-distance runner. She finished second at the 2019 Tokyo Marathon, and third at the 2021 Berlin Marathon. She has also won the Annecy and Barcelona Marathons, as well as multiple other long-distance events. Born in Ethiopia, she now lives in Switzerland.

== Personal life ==
Helen Bekele Tola was born in Ethiopia. In 2015, she moved to Geneva, Switzerland. Tola is married to Tesfaye Eticha, who competed for Switzerland at the 2012 Summer Olympics.

== Career ==
Tola competes for the Stade Geneva athletics club. In 2015, Tola won the Lausanne Marathon, and the Basler Stadtlauf, a 5.9 kilometres (3.7 mi) race around the city. In 2016, Tola won the Annecy Marathon, breaking the course record by over three minutes. In the same year, she came second at the Lake Maggiore Half Marathon in a time of 1:15:37. In 2017, she won the Barcelona Marathon in a course record time of 2:25:04. It was over four minutes better than her previous personal best. In the same year, she won the Switzerland Marathon light half-marathon event in a course record time of 1:09:47. In 2018, Tola came second at the 10 km Corrida de Houilles race, sixth at the Berlin Marathon, and ninth at the Ras Al Khaimah Half Marathon.

In 2019, Tola finished second at the Tokyo Marathon, in a personal best time of 2:21:01. She also finished fourth at the Berlin Marathon, and was in the leading group of four racers, alongside eventual winner Ashete Bekere, Mare Dibaba, and Sally Chepyego Kaptich, for most of the race. She finished in 2:21:36, 25 seconds slower than her personal best. Later in the year, Tola won the 17.7 kilometres (11.0 mi) Murtenlauf race from Murten to Fribourg in a course record time of 57:50. She broke Franziska Rochat-Moser's 22 year old previous record by over a minute. She also won the 10 km race at the Lausanne Marathon, the 10 km San Silvestre Vallecana, in a personal best time of 30:47, and the Scalata al Castello 5 kilometres (3.1 mi) race in Arezzo, Italy.

In 2020, Tola won the Madrid 10k Run, beating pre-race favourite Ruth Chepng'etich. She finished in 30:50, the fourth fastest ever time at the event. Later in the year, she came second at a Berlin 10k invitational event; her time of 30:59 was the fifth fastest time of the year. She also won the 10,000 metres event at the Swiss Athletics Championships as a guest runner, and came fourth in the one hour run race of the Memorial Van Damme Diamond League event. Tola has also won the road race at the Escalade de Genève on four occasions. Tola expressed a desire to represent Switzerland at the 2020 Summer Olympics.

In 2021, Tola won the Belp Marathon. Later in the year, she came third at the 2021 Berlin Marathon, finishing behind fellow Ethiopians Gotytom Gebreslase and Hiwot Gebrekidan. She came ninth at the 2021 Tokyo Marathon.
