= 2019 Berlin Marathon =

Running race in 2019

46th Berlin Marathon
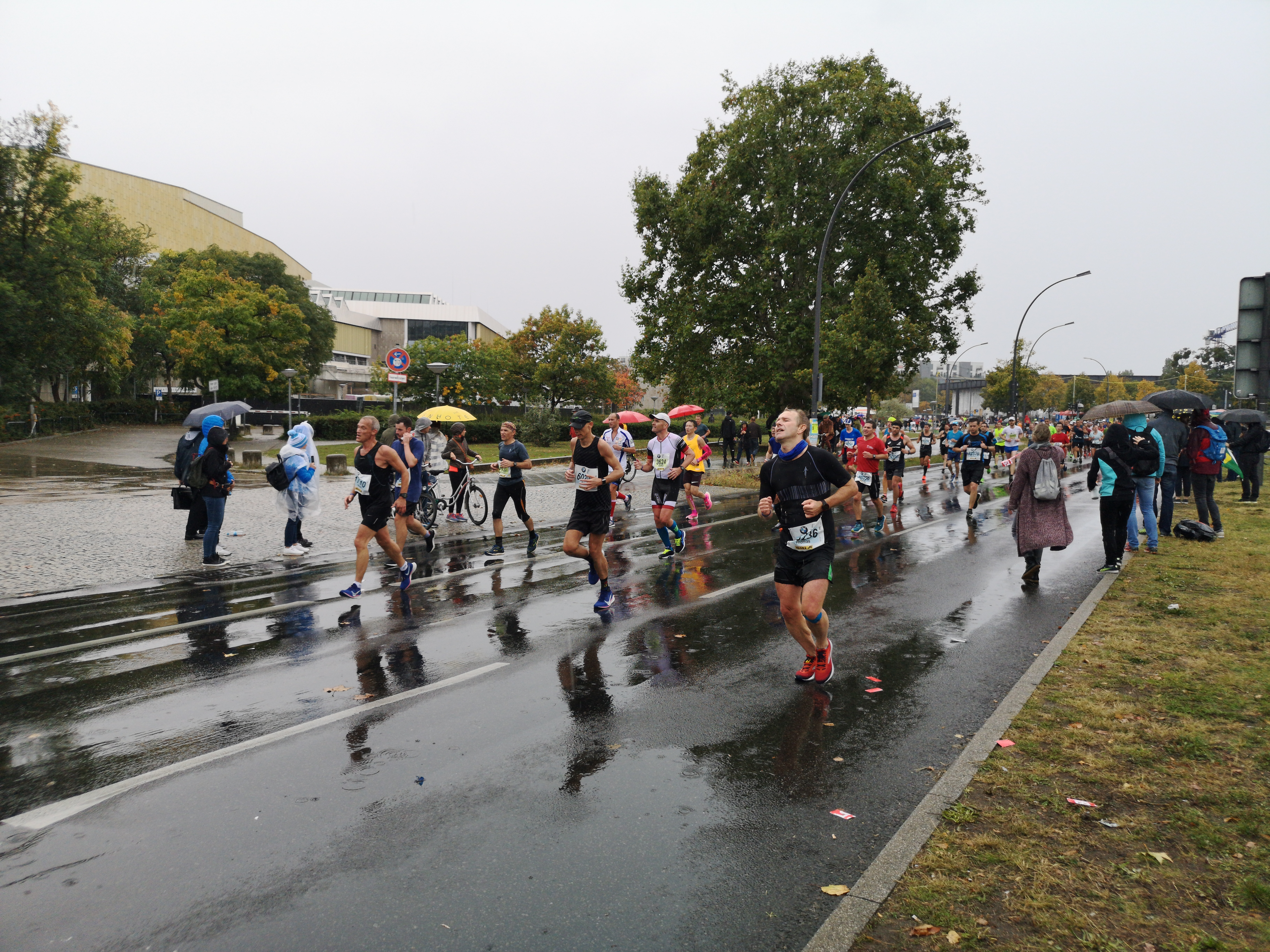
- Runners competing in the mass race
- Venue: Berlin, Germany
- Dates: 29 September 2019

Champions
- Men: Kenenisa Bekele (2:01:41)
- Women: Ashete Bekere (2:20:14)
- Wheelchair men: Marcel Hug (1:28:09)
- Wheelchair women: Manuela Schär (1:38:07)

The 2019 Berlin Marathon was a marathon race held on 29 September 2019 in Berlin, Germany. It was the 46th edition of the annual Berlin Marathon. The marathon distance is just over 26 miles (42 km) in length and the course is run around the city and starts and finishes in the Tiergarten. The elite men's race was won by Kenenisa Bekele in 2:01:41, two seconds slower than the world record set by Eliud Kipchoge in 2018. The elite women's race was won by Ashete Bekere following a sprint finish in 2:20:14. The wheelchair men's and women's races were won by Marcel Hug and Manuela Schär in 1:28:09 and 1:38:07, respectively.

== Course ==
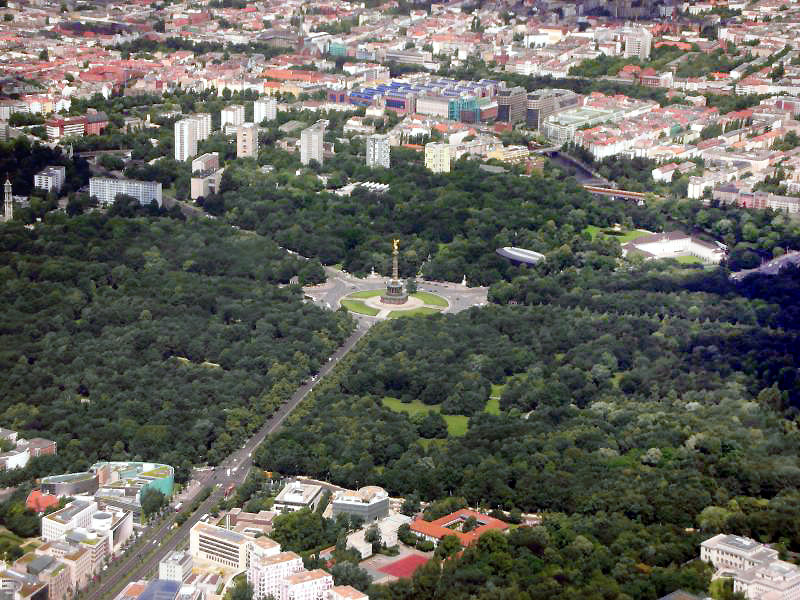
The Tiergarten, the location of the start and finish of the race. The Großer Stern is pictured in the centre.

The marathon distance is officially 42.195 kilometres (26.219 mi) long as sanctioned by the International Association of Athletics Federations (IAAF) now known as World Athletics. The course starts at the Großer Stern in the Tiergarten and runs west on the Straße des 17. Juni before turning right at the Ernst-Reuter-Platz onto the Franklinstraße. The course turns east and passes the Justizvollzugsanstalt Moabit before crossing the Spree via the Moltke Bridge, running along the southern side of the Spreebogenpark and crossing the river again via the Crown Prince Bridge. The runners continue east through Mitte until 12 kilometres (7.5 mi) before turning south to cross the de:Michaelbrücke into Neukölln. At just before 17 kilometres (11 mi), the course turn east onto the Gneisenaustraße where the course passes the halfway mark. The runners leave Schöneberg in a south-westerly direction, passing the Rathaus Schöneberg to enter Steglitz. The course runs west until just after 29 kilometres (18 mi), where it turns north-east onto Hohernzollerndamm. The runners head in the direction of the finish, passing the Kaiser Wilhelm Memorial Church in the 35th kilometre before heading east along the Leipziger Straße to the Konzerthaus Berlin. The course turns back west and passes through the Brandenburg Gate in the 42nd kilometre before re-entering the Tiergarten to finish.

The course is very flat, starting at 38 metres (125 ft) above sea level, reaching a maximum elevation of 53 metres (174 ft) and minimum of 37 metres (121 ft). The course also has few corners and is run on asphalt instead of concrete which is easier for the runners' legs. The Berlin Marathon has been host to eight men's and three women's world records since the first race in 1974.

The 2019 edition took place on the 29 September. The title sponsor for the race was German automotive corporation BMW, with the main sponsors being sportswear company Adidas, healthcare and pharmaceutical Abbott Laboratories, and tire company Giti Tire.

== Field ==
According to World Athletics, the favourite in the women's elite race was Gladys Cherono. She had won the previous year's event in a time of 2:18:11, as well as the 2015 and 2017 editions. Vivian Cheruiyot had to withdraw from the race due to issues with her Achilles tendon. Cherono was due to face tough competition from Meseret Defar who had won the 5000 metres event at the 2004 and 2012 Summer Olympics and had a marathon personal best of 2:23:33. Also racing were Mare Dibaba (2:19:52 personal best), Melat Kejeta, who was running her marathon debut and was aiming for the time of 2:22:00 having run a 1:08:41 in the half marathon, and three women who had run sub-2:22:00; Haftamnesh Tesfaye (2:20:13), Helen Tola (2:21:01), and Ashete Bekere (2:21:14). The race director, Mark Milde, called it "one of the strongest women's fields in the history of the event".

According to World Athletics, the favourite for the men's race was Kenenisa Bekele, who had won the 2016 edition in a personal best of 2:03:03. However, Bekele had struggled with an injury and had not raced since May 2019, and since setting his personal best, had withdrawn from more races than he had finished. Three other runners, all Ethiopians, had personal bests under 2:05; Leul Gebresilase, winner of the 2018 Valencia Marathon and a personal best of 2:04:02, Sisay Lemma (2:04:08), and Birhanu Legese, winner of the 2019 Tokyo Marathon and a personal best of 2:04:15. The pacemakers aimed to run through halfway in 1:01:30.

The men's wheelchair race featured 61-year-old Heinz Frei who had won the race 20 times. Brent Lakatos, winner of the 2018 race, returned to defend his title from Marcel Hug, who had lost to Lakatos in the sprint, and David Weir, the eight-time winner of the London Marathon. Also racing were 2014 winner Kota Hokinoue and Ernst van Dyk, who had won a gold medal at the 2016 Summer Paralympics. In the women's wheelchair race, four-time winner Manuela Schär returned to defend her 2018 title, which she won in a world record time of 1:36:53. She faced 2018 third-place finisher Sandra Graf, and others including Madison de Rozario and Amanda McGrory.

== Race summary ==
In the men's race, the lead group went through 5 kilometres (3.1 mi) in 14:24 and 10 kilometres (6.2 mi) in 28:53, 8 seconds quicker than Eliud Kipchoge's split at his world record run in the previous year's race. By 15 kilometres (9.3 mi), they were still 8 seconds ahead of the world record split and a group of five (Bekele, Legese, Gebresilase, Lemma, and Jonathan Korir) went through halfway in 1:01:05, one second ahead of the world record split. By 25 kilometres (16 mi), Gebresilase dropped out of the group and was soon joined by Korir, as Legese made a move shortly before the 30-kilometre (19 mi) mark, dropping Bekele then Lemma. However, Bekele had reeled Lemma back in by 35 kilometres (22 mi) and was 13 seconds behind Legese, who had run a 14:09 5-kilometre (3.1 mi) split as opposed to Bekele's 14:20 split from 30 to 35 kilometres. Bekele closed the gap, easily passing by Legese in the 38th kilometre and continued on to pass through 40 kilometres (25 mi) two seconds faster than Kipchoge's split. However, during his world record run, Kipchoge had increased the pace in the final two kilometres and Bekele was not able to match that. Despite sprinting down the final straight, he fell two seconds short of the world record in 2:01:41. Legese finished second in 2:02:48, the third-fastest marathon time ever, and Lemma was third in 2:03:36.

The women's race started with a pace that would have the lead pack finishing in the 2:20-2:22 range, with Cherono visible at the front. However, just before 30 kilometres (19 mi), Cherono dropped out of the race due to an infection. The race came down to a sprint finish where Bekere was able to win in 2:20:14 over Dibaba, who finished in 2:20:21. Sally Chepyego Kaptich was third in 2:21:06, with Tola in fourth. Sara Hall ran a four-minute personal best to finish fifth and Melat Yisak Kejeta placed sixth in 2:23:57. In the women's wheelchair race, Schär built up an early lead and was two and a half minutes ahead of the other competitors, a lead which she extended to four minutes by the end to win in 1:38:07. McGrory and Rozario finished second and third in 1:42:05 and 1:42:09, respectively. In the men's wheelchair race, Hug had pulled away from the other competitors by 5 kilometres (3.1 mi) and "cruised" through the rest of the race to win by over three and a half minutes in 1:28:09. Weir finished second in 1:31:45, with Lakatos third, one second behind.

== Results ==
Results for the top ten in the running races and top three in the wheelchair races are listed below.

Men's race result
| Position | Athlete | Nationality | Time |
|---|---|---|---|
| 1st place, gold medalist(s) | Kenenisa Bekele | Ethiopia | 2:01:41 |
| 2nd place, silver medalist(s) | Birhanu Legese | Ethiopia | 2:02:48 |
| 3rd place, bronze medalist(s) | Sisay Lemma | Ethiopia | 2:03:36 |
| 4 | Jonathan Korir | Kenya | 2:06:45 |
| 5 | Felix Kandie | Kenya | 2:08:07 |
| 6 | Yohanes Gebregergish | Eritrea | 2:08:26 |
| 7 | Dong Guojian | China | 2:08:28 |
| 8 | Bethwel Yegon | Kenya | 2:08:35 |
| 9 | Kenta Murayama | Japan | 2:08:56 |
| 10 | Abel Kipchumba | Kenya | 2:09:39 |

Women's race result
| Position | Athlete | Nationality | Time |
|---|---|---|---|
| 1st place, gold medalist(s) | Ashete Bekere | Ethiopia | 2:20:14 |
| 2nd place, silver medalist(s) | Mare Dibaba | Ethiopia | 2:20:21 |
| 3rd place, bronze medalist(s) | Sally Chepyego Kaptich | Kenya | 2:21:06 |
| 4 | Helen Tola | Ethiopia | 2:21:36 |
| 5 | Sara Hall | United States | 2:22:16 |
| 6 | Melat Yisak Kejeta | Germany | 2:23:57 |
| 7 | Sally Kipyego | United States | 2:25:10 |
| 8 | Haftamnesh Tesfaye | Ethiopia | 2:26:50 |
| 9 | Martina Strähl | Switzerland | 2:31:24 |
| 10 | Nina Lauwaert | Belgium | 2:31:25 |

Wheelchair men's race result
| Position | Athlete | Nationality | Time |
|---|---|---|---|
| 1st place, gold medalist(s) | Marcel Hug | Switzerland | 1:28:09 |
| 2nd place, silver medalist(s) | David Weir | United Kingdom | 1:37:26 |
| 3rd place, bronze medalist(s) | Brent Lakatos | Canada | 1:37:28 |

Wheelchair women's race result
| Position | Athlete | Nationality | Time |
|---|---|---|---|
| 1st place, gold medalist(s) | Manuela Schär | Switzerland | 1:38:07 |
| 2nd place, silver medalist(s) | Amanda McGrory | United States | 1:42:05 |
| 3rd place, bronze medalist(s) | Madison de Rozario | Australia | 1:42:09 |
