= 2021 London Marathon =

41st annual marathon race in London

41st London Marathon
- Venue: London, England
- Date: 3 October 2021
- Competitors: c. 40,000

Champions
- Men: Sisay Lemma (2:04:01)
- Women: Joyciline Jepkosgei (02:17:43)
- Wheelchair men: Marcel Hug (1:26:27)
- Wheelchair women: Manuela Schär (1:39:52)

The 2021 London Marathon was the 41st running of the annual London Marathon on 3 October 2021. Due to the COVID-19 pandemic, the race was postponed from April until October to maximise the chances of a mass participation event.

The elite events were won by Sisay Lemma of Ethiopia and Joyciline Jepkosgei of Kenya, in 2:04:01 and 2:17:43, respectively. The wheelchair races were won by Marcel Hug and Manuela Schär, both of Switzerland, in 1:26:27 and 1:39:52, respectively. Both Hug and Schär set course records, with Hug breaking Australian Kurt Fearnley's record of 1:28:57 set in 2009, and Schär breaking her own record of 1:39:57 set in 2017. Around 40,000 competed in the mass participation event, with an additional 40,000 people partaking in the virtual marathon.

== Background ==
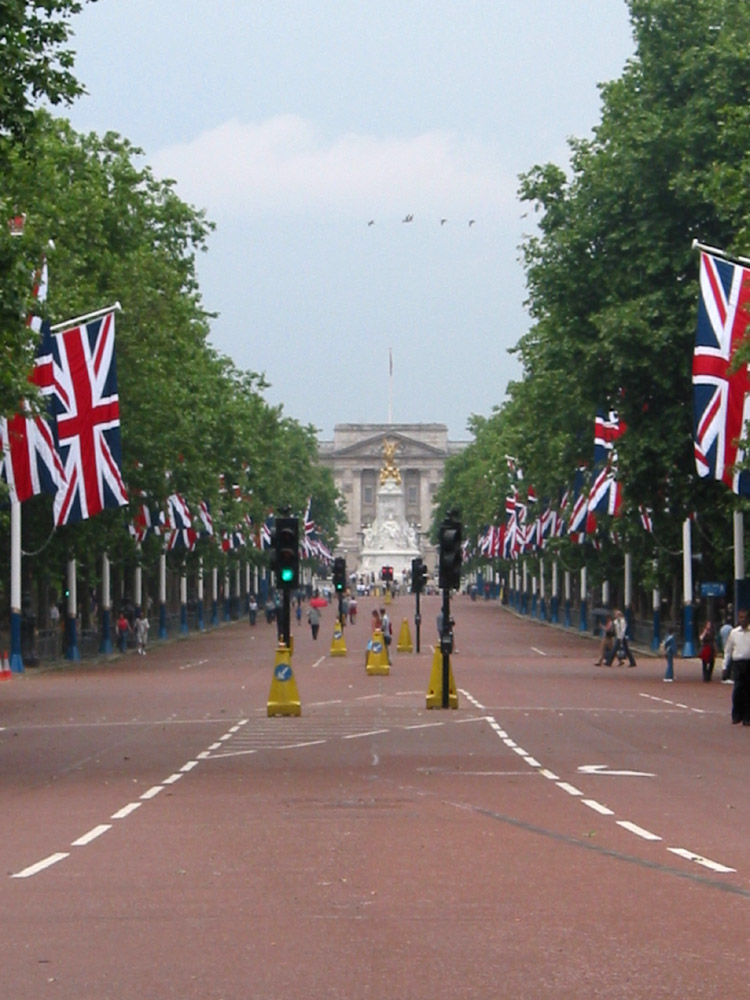
The Mall, the location of the finish of the race.

The 41st running of the London Marathon was originally scheduled for April, but due to the continued effects of the COVID-19 pandemic, the race was postponed until October to increase the chances that such a large event could be held safely. The race was run on 3 October, and was the second of the five World Marathon Majors held in 2021; all events in the series were run in the space of six weeks between late September and early November. (Note: The Tokyo Marathon, which is the sixth World Marathon Major, was postponed until 2022.) All competitors in the elite event had to take regular COVID PCR tests, whilst those in the mass participation event had to provide proof of a negative lateral flow test. Elite African athletes were flown to the event on charter planes to minimise the COVID-19 risk.

The winner of each elite event received a prize of $55,000, with a total amount of $313,000 awarded to competitors based on finishing positions. There was additional prize money available for competitors who set a course record or finished faster than a specified time.

=== Course ===
Unlike the 2020 event, which was run behind closed doors on a special course around St James's Park, the 2021 race returned to the traditional London Marathon course. It was the first time that the race was run in October on the traditional course.

The marathon distance is officially 42.195 kilometres (26.219 mi) long as sanctioned by World Athletics (IAAF). The London Marathon is run over a mainly flat course, starting in Blackheath. The course begins at three separate points and they converge just before 3 miles (4.8 km) into the race. At just after 10 kilometres (6.2 mi) into the race, the runners reach the 19th-century clipper Cutty Sark docked in Greenwich and at about halfway into the race, the runners cross Tower Bridge before heading east into Shadwell and Canary Wharf. After winding through Canary Wharf, the route returns through Shadwell on the other side of the road to which it entered before passing through Tower Hill. The runners enter the underpass in Blackfriars before running along the Thames Embankment, past Westminster and onto Birdcage Walk. The course then runs parallel to St James's Park before turning onto The Mall and finishing in front of Buckingham Palace.

== Competitors ==
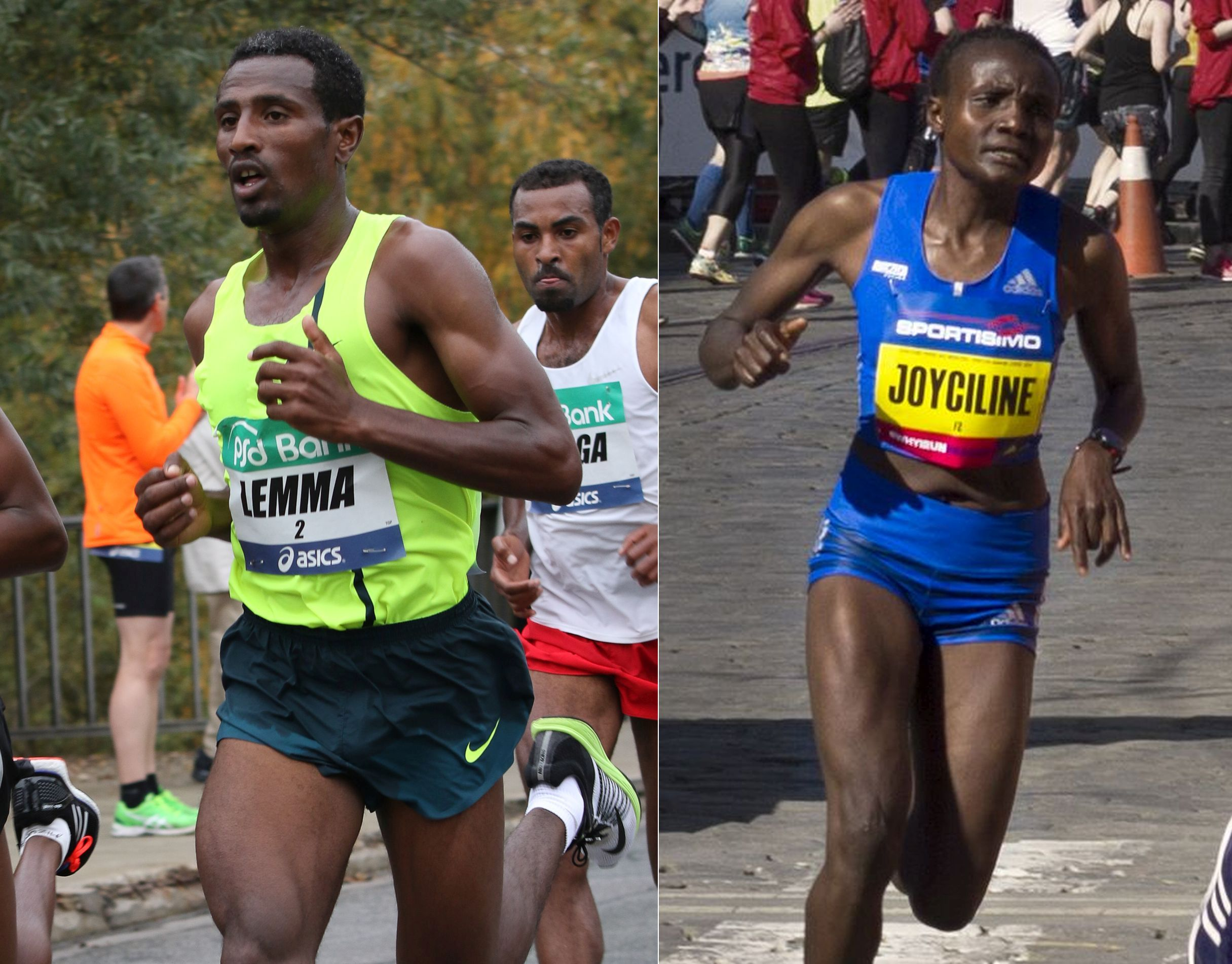
Sisay Lemma won the elite men's race, and Joyciline Jepkosgei won the elite women's event.

The top three finishers in the 2020 elite men's race – winner Shura Kitata and runners-up Vincent Kipchumba and Sisay Lemma – all returned to compete in 2021. Mosinet Geremew who finished second at the 2019 London Marathon, also competed. Other competitors included Evans Chebet, who won the 2020 Valencia Marathon and had the world leading marathon time in 2020, and Birhanu Legese, who had previously won two Tokyo Marathons. Seven competitors had a personal best time of under 2:05.00. Eliud Kipchoge, who had won the London Marathon on four occasions and won the men's marathon event at the delayed 2020 Summer Olympics, was not on the race's entry list. Briton Mo Farah did not compete due to a foot injury. Ethiopian Kinde Atanaw tested positive for COVID-19 in the days leading up to the race. He did not race, and the other Ethiopian athletes had to minimise contact with other people.

The elite women's race featured 2019 and 2020 race winner Brigid Kosgei, who came second in the women's marathon event at the delayed 2020 Summer Olympics. Other race favourites included Joyciline Jepkosgei, who won the 2019 New York City Marathon, Roza Dereje, who had the second best personal best time behind Kosgei, and Birhane Dibaba, who won the 2015 and 2018 Tokyo Marathons. The race also contained Valary Jemeli, Zeineba Yimer and Tigist Girma, all of whom had personal best times under 2:20.00. 44-year-old Australian Sinead Diver and Allie Kieffer, who won the 2018 Toronto Half Marathon, also competed.

The wheelchair men's race featured 2020 winner Brent Lakatos and 2019 winner Daniel Romanchuk. Eight time former winner David Weir and two-time champion Marcel Hug also raced. Hug won the men's marathon T54 at the 2020 Summer Paralympics, and it was Weir's 22nd consecutive appearance at the race.

In the wheelchair women's race, 2020 winner Nikita den Boer competed. Course record holder and twice former winner Manuela Schär competed, as did Tatyana McFadden, who won four times between 2013 and 2016, 2018 champion Madison de Rozario, and Susannah Scaroni, who was third in the 2017 and 2018 London Marathons.

== Race summary ==
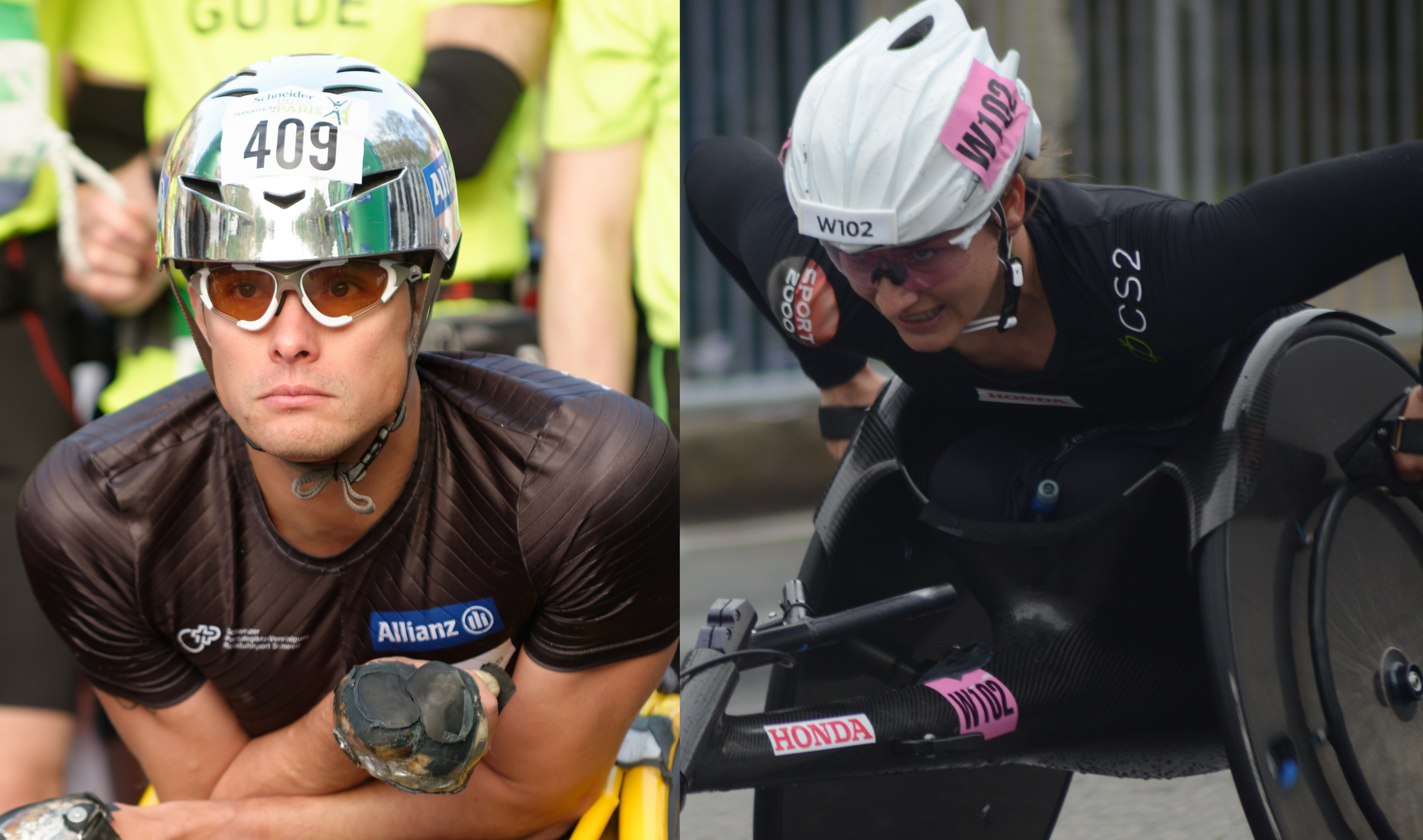
Marcel Hug and Manuela Schär won the men's and women's wheelchair races respectively.

The men's and women's wheelchair races commenced at 08:50 BST (UTC+1), the elite women's event began at 09:00 BST and the elite men's race started at 09:30 BST. The wheelchair and elite races were run in cool, dry conditions.

The elite men's race was won by Ethiopian Sisay Lemma in a time of 02:04:01, the sixth fastest London Marathon time in history. Kenyan Vincent Kipchumba and Ethiopian Mosinet Geremew finished second and third respectively. 2020 winner Shura Kitata finished sixth after struggling with a hamstring injury. Shura had fallen behind the leading group within the first 5 kilometres (3.1 mi). Philip Sesemann was the top finishing Briton in the race; he finished seventh overall. It was his first marathon event, and as a result, he qualified for the marathon events at the 2022 European Athletics Championships and 2022 Commonwealth Games. After around 17 miles (27 km) of the race, Titus Ekiru withdrew. Lemma slowed down to celebrate winning the race, and as a result, he missed out on a $25,000 bonus given to competitors who finished the race in under 02:04:00. Lemma was also unable to give post-race interviews, as he was not allowed to mix with new people due to Atanaw's positive COVID test.

The elite women's race was won by Kenyan Joyciline Jepkosgei. Her winning time of 02:17:30 was the seventh fastest London Marathon time ever. Jepkosgei took the lead 22 miles (35 km) into the race. 2020 winner Brigid Kosgei finished fourth overall; she had fallen away from the leading group around 35 kilometres (22 mi) into the race. The top three finishers were Jepkosgei, Degitu Azimeraw, and Ashete Bekere, all of whom had not competed at the 2020 Summer Olympics. The top five finishers all recorded times faster than 02:19:00, the first time in marathon history that this had occurred. Charlotte Purdue was the top British finisher in the race; she finished 10th overall in a personal best time of 02:23:26. Her time was the third fastest marathon time by a British woman ever, and she missed out on the second fastest time, set by Mara Yamauchi, by 14 seconds.

The men's wheelchair race was won by Swiss athlete Marcel Hug in a course record time of 01:26:27; the previous record was set by Australian Kurt Fearnley in 2009. It was Hug's third victory at the event. Hug broke away from American Daniel Romanchuk after 13 miles (21 km) of the race, and maintained it to the end, eventually winning by over three minutes. Romanchuk finished second, and Briton David Weir finished third, beating Canadian Brent Lakatos in a sprint finish.

The women's wheelchair race was won by Swiss athlete Manuela Schär in a course record time of 01:39:52; it was her third victory at the event, and she beat her own course record from 2017 by five seconds. Schär broke away from the field after 5 miles (8.0 km) of the race, and at the halfway point of the race, her lead was a minute and 52 seconds. Merle Menje and Tatyana McFadden finished second and third respectively, and were separated by a few thousands of a second.

=== Non-elite events ===
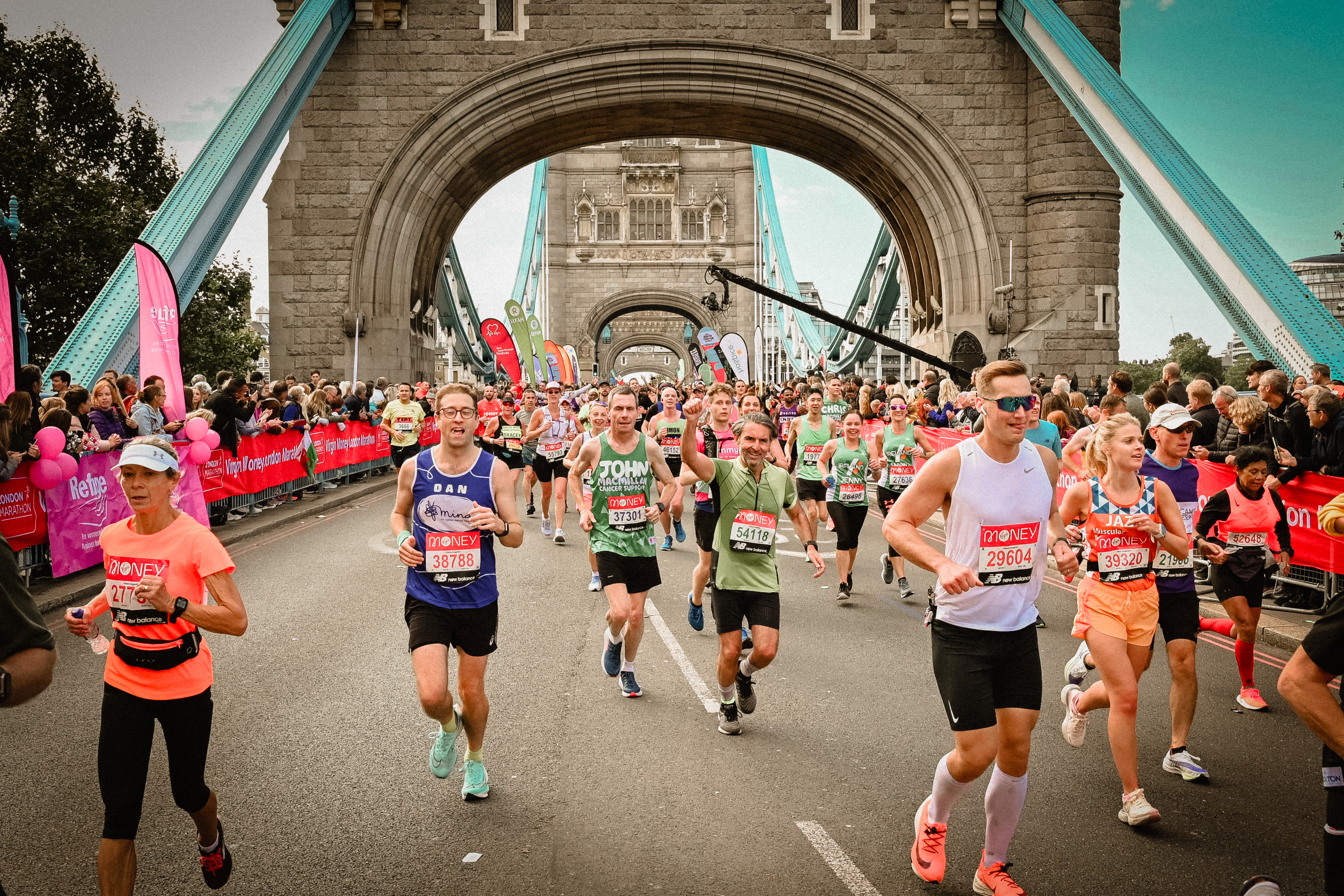
Runners crossing over Tower Bridge.

A 2.6 kilometres (1.6 mi) mini-marathon for children between the ages of 11 and 17 began at 08:30 BST. The route started in Temple Place and finished on The Mall, and the race distance was shorter than in previous years. The mass-start in-person event commenced at 09:30 BST. In order to reduce crowding on the course, the event used a staggered start of competitors, with 40 separate groups beginning over the course of 90 minutes. It was the first time since 2000 that the race did not use pacers to help competitors with their timings. In July 2021, the race organisers were criticised for refusing to allow a pregnant woman to defer her entry to the mass participation event until 2022.

It was hoped that a record 50,000 people would run in the 2021 mass participation event. It was expected that an additional 50,000 runners would run a virtual marathon. Competitors had to use the official app to record their marathon at any time from 00:00 to 23:59 on 3 October. In reality, around 80,000 people ran the event: about 40,000 in person, and about 40,000 ran virtually. Celebrity competitors included former England cricket captain Andrew Strauss, who ran to support his wife who died in 2018, former Health Secretary Matt Hancock, television presenters Chris Evans and Sophie Raworth, former Olympic rower James Cracknell and EastEnders actress Tanya Franks. The youngest competitor in the race was 18 years and one day old, and the oldest runner was an 87-year-old from Japan.

== Results ==
Only the top 10 finishers in each race are listed.

=== Men ===
Elite men's top 10 finishers
Position	Athlete	Nationality	Time
1st place, gold medalist(s)	Sisay Lemma	Ethiopia	02:04:01
2nd place, silver medalist(s)	Vincent Kipchumba	Kenya	02:04:28
3rd place, bronze medalist(s)	Mosinet Geremew	Ethiopia	02:04:41
4	Evans Chebet	Kenya	02:05:43
5	Birhanu Legese	Ethiopia	02:06:10
6	Shura Kitata	Ethiopia	02:07:51
7	Philip Sesemann	United Kingdom	02:12:58
8	Josh Griffiths	United Kingdom	02:13:39
9	Matthew Leach	United Kingdom	02:15:31
10	Andrew Davies	United Kingdom	02:15:36

=== Women ===
Elite women's top 10 finishers
Position	Athlete	Nationality	Time
1st place, gold medalist(s)	Joyciline Jepkosgei	Kenya	02:17:43
2nd place, silver medalist(s)	Degitu Azimeraw	Ethiopia	02:17:58
3rd place, bronze medalist(s)	Ashete Bekere	Ethiopia	02:18:18
4	Brigid Kosgei	Kenya	02:18:40
5	Lonah Chemtai Salpeter	Israel	02:18:54
6	Valary Jemeli	Kenya	02:20:35
7	Joan Melly	Kenya	02:21:23
8	Zeineba Yimer	Ethiopia	02:21:40
9	Tigist Girma	Ethiopia	02:22:45
10	Charlotte Purdue	United Kingdom	02:23:26

=== Wheelchair men ===
Wheelchair men's top 10 finishers
Position	Athlete	Nationality	Time
1st place, gold medalist(s)	Marcel Hug	Switzerland	01:26:27
2nd place, silver medalist(s)	Daniel Romanchuk	United States	01:29:27
3rd place, bronze medalist(s)	David Weir	United Kingdom	01:31:34
4	Brent Lakatos	Canada	01:31:34
5	Aaron Pike	United States	01:31:36
6	Johnboy Smith	United Kingdom	01:35:54
7	Sho Watanabe	Japan	01:35:55
8	Jordi Madera Jimenez	Spain	01:35:55
9	Kota Hokinoue	Japan	01:35:56
10	Hiroki Nishida	Japan	01:35:56

=== Wheelchair women ===
Wheelchair women's top 10 finishers
Position	Athlete	Nationality	Time
1st place, gold medalist(s)	Manuela Schär	Switzerland	01:39:52
2nd place, silver medalist(s)	Merle Menje	Germany	01:44:51
3rd place, bronze medalist(s)	Tatyana McFadden	United States	01:44:51
4	Nikita den Boer	Netherlands	01:44:54
5	Aline Rocha	Brazil	01:50:07
6	Shelly Woods	United Kingdom	01:50:11
7	Vanessa de Souza	Brazil	01:50:13
8	Patricia Eachus	Switzerland	01:56:59
9	Jenna Fesemyer	United States	02:03:08
10	Margriet van den Broek	Netherlands	02:06:00
