= Birhanu Legese =

Ethiopian long-distance runner

Personal information
- Born: Birhanu Legese Gurmesa; 11 September 1994 (age 31) Woliso, Oromia, Ethiopia

Sport
- Country: Ethiopia
- Sport: Athletics
- Event: Long-distance running
- Team: NN Running Team
- Coached by: Jos Hermens

Achievements and titles
- Personal best: Marathon: 2:02:48 (Berlin 2019)
Medal record
Men's athletics
Representing Ethiopia
World Marathon Majors
Gold medal – first place	2019 Tokyo	Marathon
Gold medal – first place	2020 Tokyo	Marathon
Silver medal – second place	2019 Berlin	Marathon

Birhanu Legese Gurmesa (born 11 September 1994) is an Ethiopian long-distance runner. He won the 2019 and 2020 Tokyo Marathon and finished second at the 2019 Berlin Marathon.

Legese is currently part of the NN Running Team, which is managed by Global Sports Communication.

== Career ==
Born and raised in Woliso, around 100 km south west of Addis Ababa, Birhanu Legese started out as a talented sprinter, winning area 100 metres and 200 m titles.

In 2012, he ran 10 kilometres races, finishing second at the Great Ethiopian Run and, in his international debut, winning the Corrida de Houilles in France.

In 2013, the then 18-year-old finished second in the 10 km in Taroudant, Morocco with a time of 27:34, the third-fastest 10 km road time in the world for 2013.

In 2015, Legese claimed victory at the Berlin Half Marathon (59:45) before winning Delhi Half Marathon in a time of 59:20, the joint third-fastest time in the world that year.

Further half marathon victories followed at the Ras Al Khaimah Half Marathon in the United Arab Emirates in 2016 (1:00:40) and New Delhi once again in 2017 (59:46).

In January 2018, Legese made his marathon debut at the Dubai Marathon, finishing sixth with a time of 2:04:15.

In March 2019, the 24-year-old claimed his biggest victory up to that point by winning his first World Marathon Major at the Tokyo Marathon by a two-minute margin, clocking 2:04:48 despite cold and rainy conditions. In September that year, Legese finished second at the Berlin Marathon with a time of 2:02:48 to move to third on the world all-time list behind only Eliud Kipchoge and Kenenisa Bekele.

He successfully defended his title at the 2020 Tokyo Marathon by winning the race with a time of 2:04:15. He ran 2:03:16 for third at the Valencia Marathon in December that year.

Legese placed fifth at the 2021 London Marathon, and sixth at the 2022 London Marathon.

== Marathon performances ==
- 2018 Dubai Marathon – 2:04:15 (6th)
- 2018 Chicago Marathon – 2:08:41 (10th)
- 2019 Tokyo Marathon – 2:04:48 (1st)
- 2019 Berlin Marathon – 2:02:48 (2nd)
- 2020 Tokyo Marathon – 2:04:15 (1st)
- 2020 Valencia Marathon – 2:03.16 (3rd)
- 2021 London Marathon – 2:06.10 (5th)
- 2022 London Marathon – 2:06.11 (6th)
- 2023 Amsterdam Marathon – 2:04.43 (4th)

== Personal bests ==
Birhanu Legese's personal bests are:

Distance	Time	Place	Date
1500 Metres	3:44.07	Luanda, Angola	2 January 2014
3000 Metres	7:51.09	Hengelo, Netherlands	8 June 2014
5000 Metres	13:08.88	Shanghai, China	18 May 2014
10 Kilometres	27:34	Taroudant, Morocco	10 March 2013
10 Miles Road	45:38	Amsterdam, Netherlands	17 September 2017
Half Marathon	59:20	New Delhi, India	29 November 2015
25 Kilometres	1:12:54	Kolkata, India	18 December 2022
Marathon	2:02:48	Berlin, Germany	29 September 2019
