= 2024 Boston Marathon =

Footrace in Boston, Massachusetts, USA

- Location: Boston, Massachusetts, U.S.
- Date: April 15, 2024
- Website: https://www.baa.org/races/boston-marathon

Champions
- Men: Sisay Lemma (2:06:17)
- Women: Hellen Obiri (2:22:27)
- Wheelchair men: Marcel Hug (1:15:33)
- Wheelchair women: Eden Rainbow-Cooper (1:35:11)

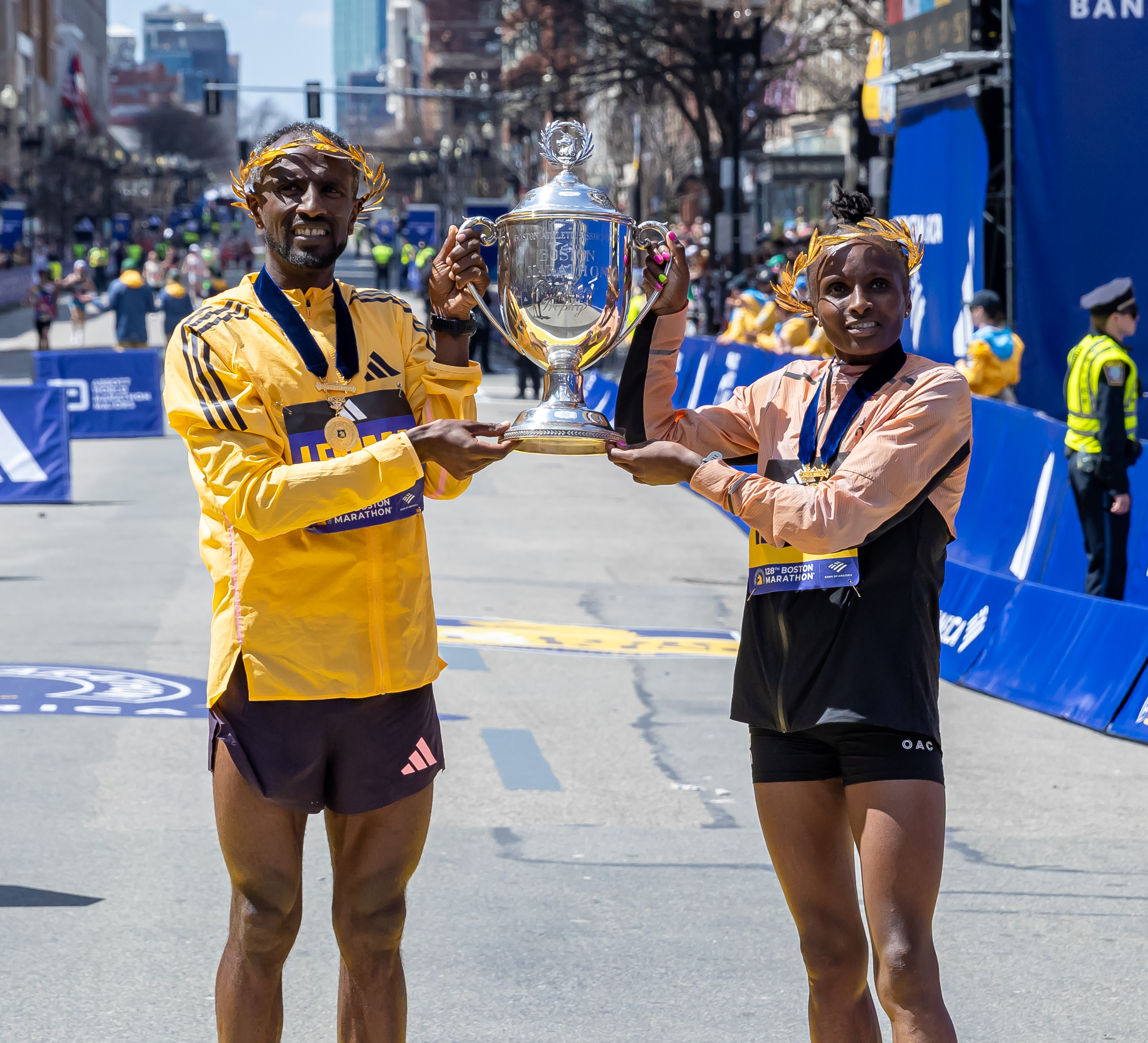
Men's winner Sisay Lemma and women's winner Hellen Obiri pose together after their victories

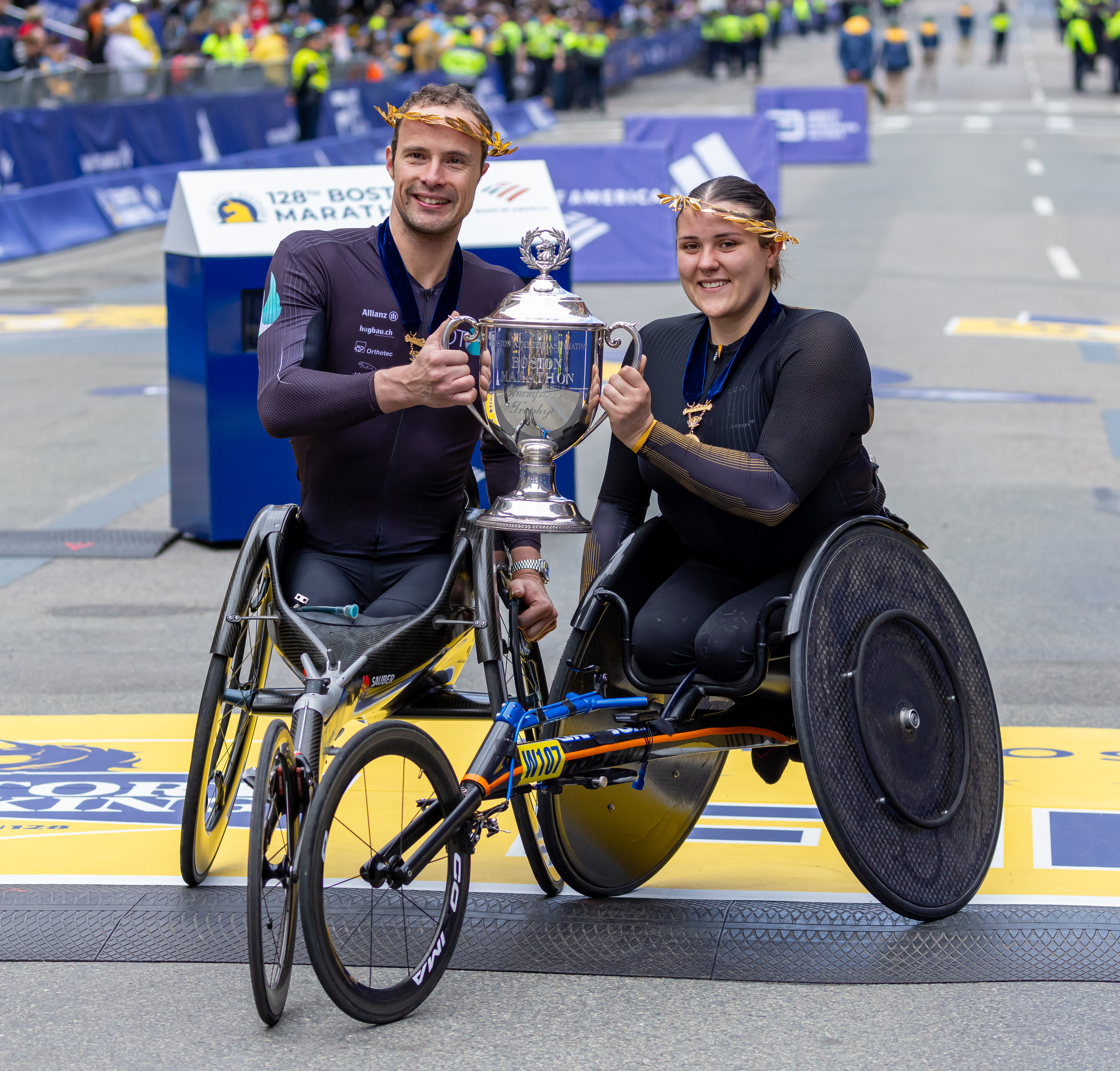
Men's wheelchair winner Marcel Hug and women's wheelchair winner Eden Rainbow-Cooper pose together after their victories

The 2024 Boston Marathon was the 128th official edition of the annual marathon race in Boston, Massachusetts, run on Monday, April 15, 2024. A Platinum Label marathon, it was the second of six World Marathon Majors events scheduled for 2024.

The number of participants was limited to 30,000, with 22,019 runners chosen basen on their performances in qualifying events. A record number of 33,000 runners applied to run the race, from 127 countries.

In mid-March, organizers announced that former NFL player Rob Gronkowski was selected as the event's grand marshall.

Winner of the men's elite division was Sisay Lemma, and the women's elite division was won by Hellen Obiri. Two-time defending men's champion Evans Chebet, looking to become the fifth man to win the event three consecutive times, finished third. In the wheelchair divisions, the men's winner was Marcel Hug and the women's winner was Eden Rainbow-Cooper. Rainbow-Cooper became the first winner from Great Britain of the event's women's wheelchair division.

== Results ==
=== Men ===
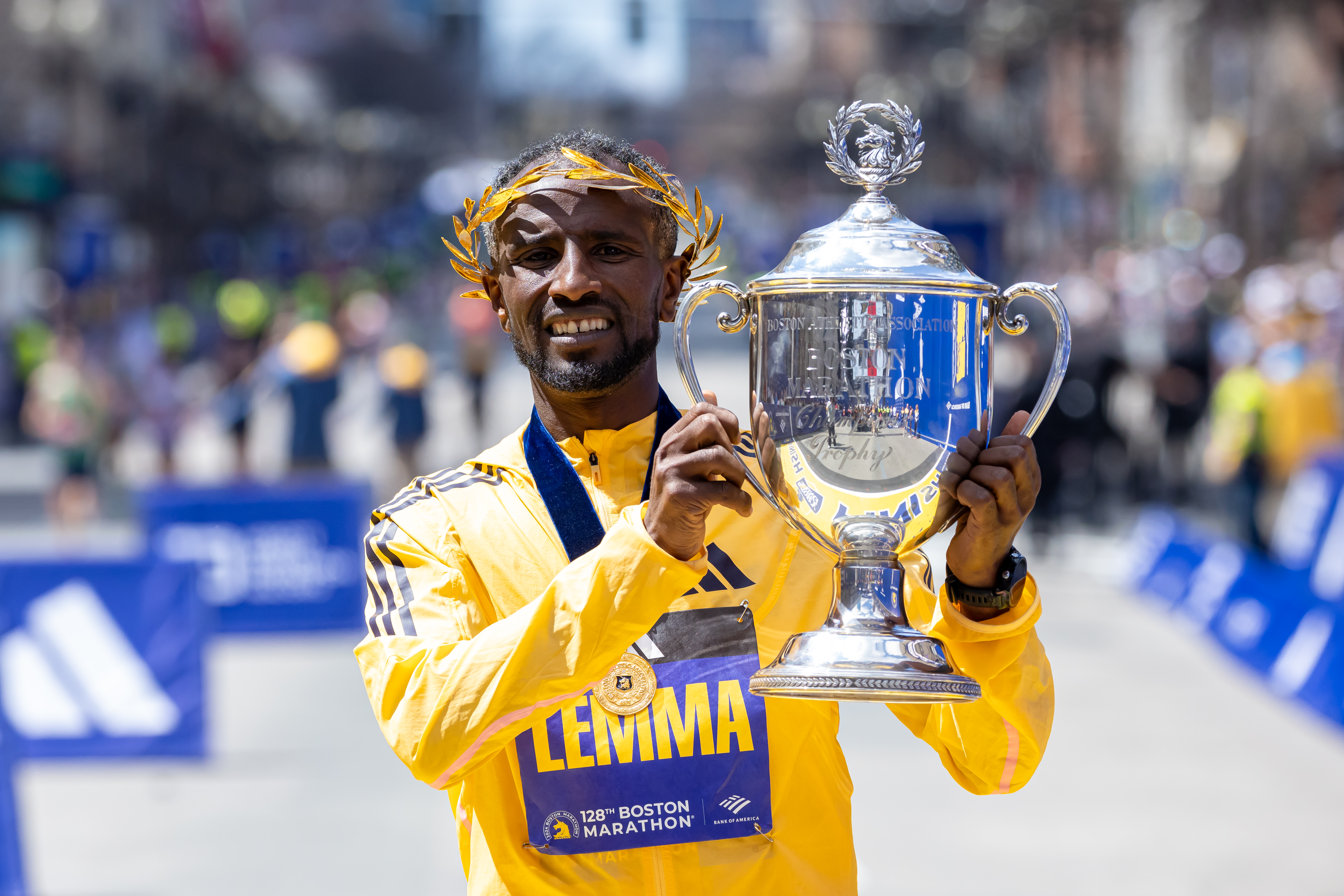
Sisay Lemma after his victory

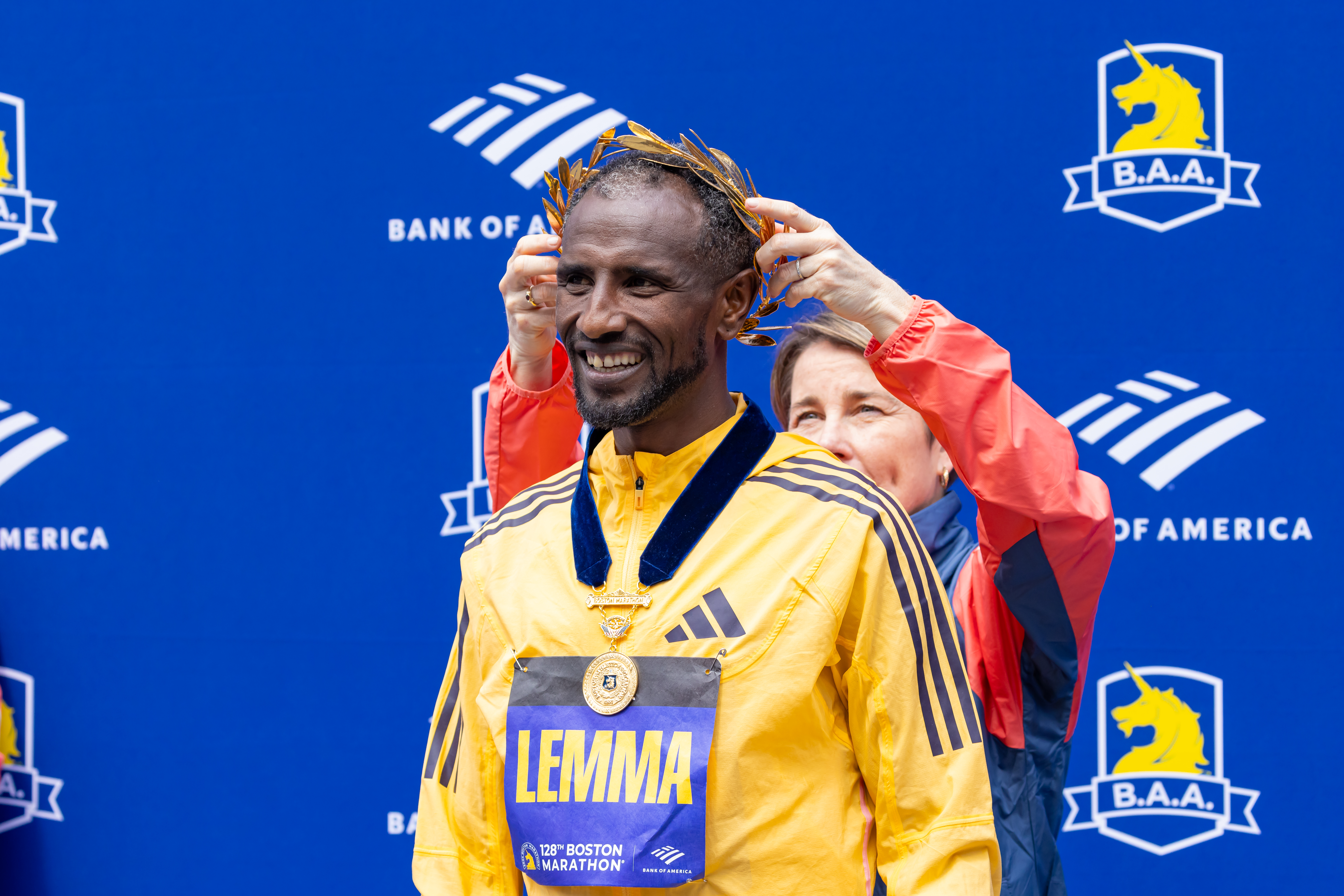
Massachusetts Governor Maura Healey crowning Lemma as the winner

Elite men's top 30 finishers
Place	Athlete	Nationality	Time
1st place, gold medalist(s)	Sisay Lemma	Ethiopia	2:06:17
2nd place, silver medalist(s)	Mohamed Esa	Ethiopia	2:06:58
3rd place, bronze medalist(s)	Evans Chebet	Kenya	2:07:22
4	John Korir	Kenya	2:07:40
5	Albert Korir	Kenya	2:07:47
6	Isaac Mpofu	Zimbabwe	2:08:17
7	CJ Albertson	United States	2:09:53
8	Yuma Morii	Japan	2:09:59
9	Cyprian Kimurgor Kotut	Kenya	2:10:29
10	Zouhair Talbi	Morocco	2:10:45
11	Shura Kitata	Ethiopia	2:10:45
12	Sondre Nordstad Moen	Norway	2:10:45
13	Suguru Osako	Japan	2:10:45
14	Elkanah Kibet	United States	2:10:45
15	Ryan Eiler	United States	2:14:22
16	Yemane Haileselassie	Ethiopia	2:14:44
17	Primož Kobe	Slovenia	2:14:56
18	Patrick Smyth	United States	2:15:45
19	Grant O'Connor	United States	2:16:17
20	Alexandru Corneschi	Romania	2:16:23
21	Robert Miranda	United States	2:16:28
22	Ryoma Takeuchi	Japan	2:16:43
23	Lorenz Baum	Germany	2:16:51
24	Jacob Shiohira	United States	2:17:08
25	Kento Otsu	Japan	2:17:57
26	Kristoffer Mugrage	Philippines	2:18:46
27	Prescott Leach	United States	2:19:50
28	Giovanni Grano	Italy	2:19:56
29	Andrew McCann	United States	2:20:06
30	Joel Conn	United States	2:21:35

=== Women ===
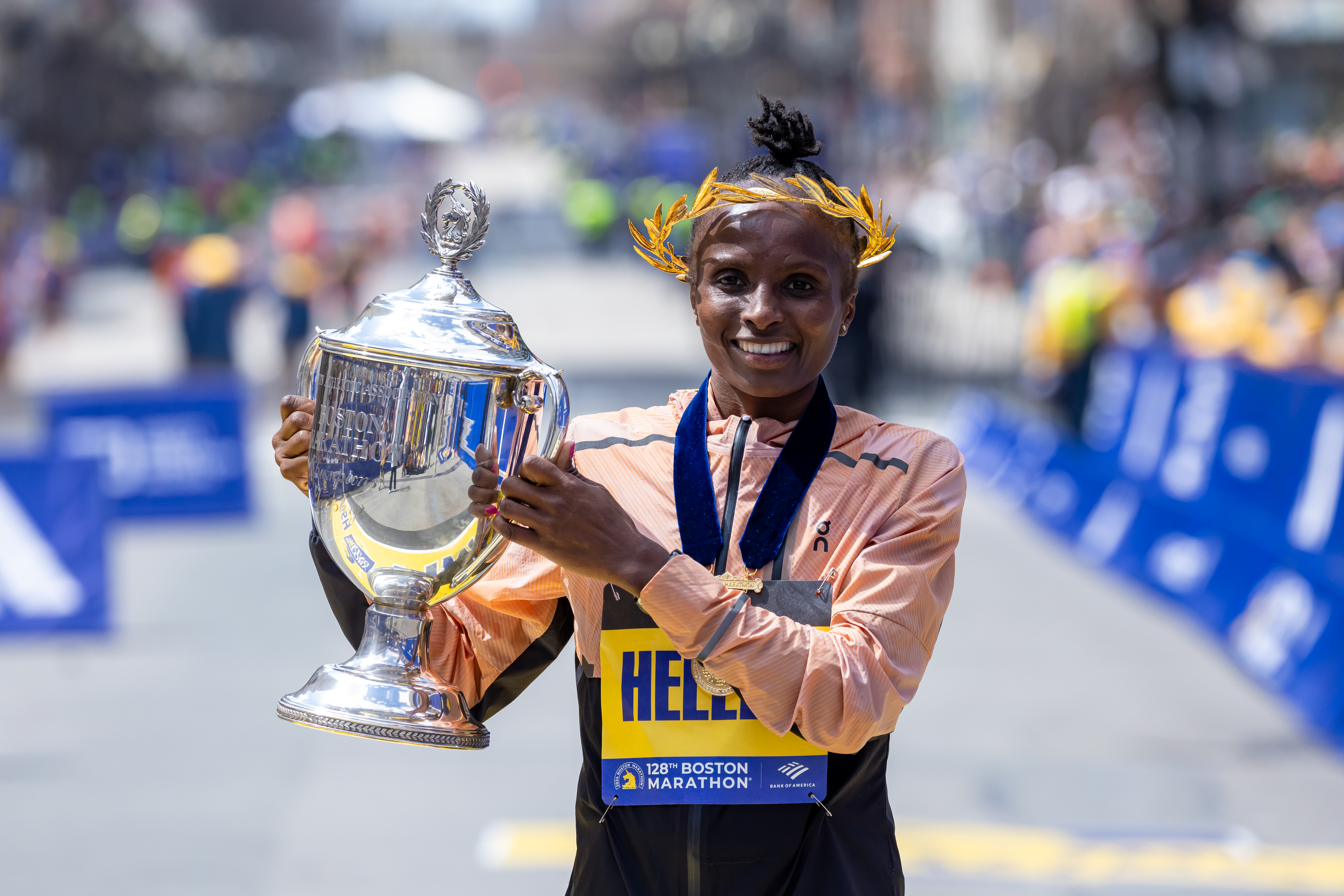
Hellen Obiri after her victory

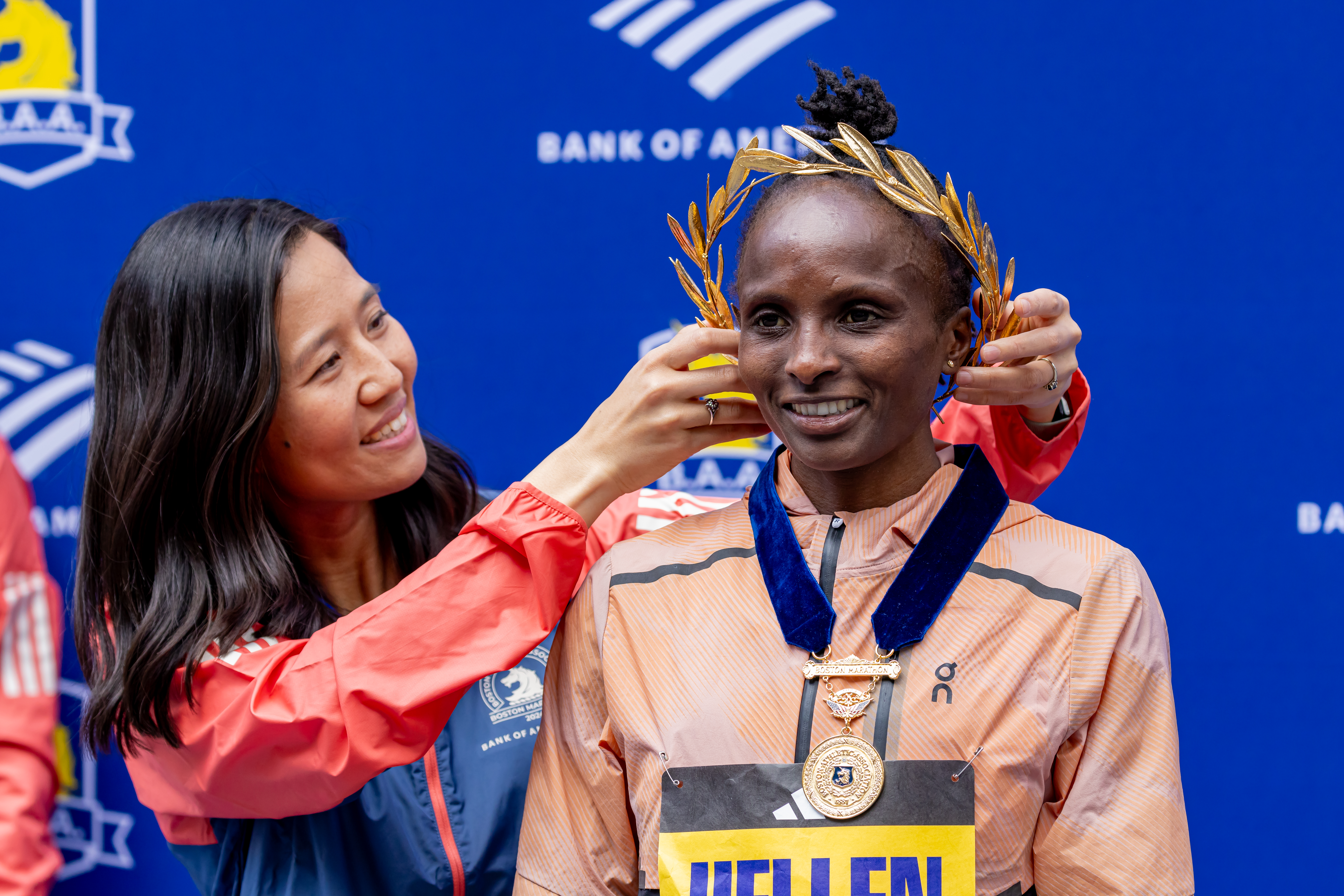
Boston Mayor Michelle Wu crowning Obiri as the winner

Elite women's top 30 finishers
Place	Athlete	Nationality	Time
1st place, gold medalist(s)	Hellen Obiri	Kenya	2:22:37
2nd place, silver medalist(s)	Sharon Lokedi	Kenya	2:22:45
3rd place, bronze medalist(s)	Edna Kiplagat	Kenya	2:23:21
4	Buze Diriba	Ethiopia	2:24:04
5	Senbere Teferi	Ethiopia	2:24:04
6	Mary Ngugi	Kenya	2:24:24
7	Workenesh Edesa	Ethiopia	2:24:47
8	Fatima Ezzahra Gardadi	Morocco	2:24:53
9	Tiruye Mesfin	Ethiopia	2:24:58
10	Dera Dida	Ethiopia	2:25:16
11	Siranesh Yirga	Ethiopia	2:26:31
12	Emma Bates	United States	2:27:14
13	Vibian Chepkirui	Kenya	2:27:23
14	Helah Kiprop	Kenya	2:27:36
15	Sara Hall	United States	2:27:58
16	Desiree Linden	United States	2:28:27
17	Meseret Belete	Ethiopia	2:31:03
18	Jenny Simpson	United States	2:31:39
19	Angie Orjuela	Colombia	2:32:14
20	Dominique Scott	South Africa	2:32:31
21	Argentina Valdepeñas Cerna	Mexico	2:37:57
22	Katie Kellner	United States	2:38:19
23	Michelle Krezonoski	Canada	2:38:23
24	Rachel Hyland	United States	2:40:24
25	Sara Lopez	United States	2:40:28
26	Kim Krezonoski	Canada	2:40:50
27	Abigail Corrigan	United States	2:42:54
28	Johanna Bäcklund	Sweden	2:43:01
29	Emilee Risteen	United States	2:43:12
30	Maura Lemon	United States	2:44:39

=== Wheelchair men ===
Wheelchair men's top 3 finishers
Position	Athlete	Nationality	Time
1st place, gold medalist(s)	Marcel Hug	Switzerland	01:15:33
2nd place, silver medalist(s)	Daniel Romanchuk	United States	01:20:37
3rd place, bronze medalist(s)	David Weir	United Kingdom	01:22:12

=== Wheelchair women ===
Wheelchair women's top 3 finishers
Position	Athlete	Nationality	Time
1st place, gold medalist(s)	Eden Rainbow-Cooper	United Kingdom	01:35:11
2nd place, silver medalist(s)	Manuela Schär	Switzerland	01:36:41
3rd place, bronze medalist(s)	Madison De Rozario	Australia	01:39:20

=== Military March ===
In 2024, after completing the 26.2-mile 2024 Boston Marathon march in his US Army uniform and finishing in first place, US Army Captain Kanwar Singh raised awareness about veteran suicide by doing 22 push-ups at the finish line

In this category, Massachusetts Army and Air National Guard personnel compete in their miltary uniforms. The race begins at 6:00 AM, and participants must walk the entire 26.2 mile course; running is strictly prohibited.

In 2024, after completing the 26.2-mile 2024 Boston Marathon march in his US Army uniform and finishing in first place, US Army Captain Kanwar Singh raised awareness about veteran suicide by doing 22 push-ups at the finish line.

== Gallery ==
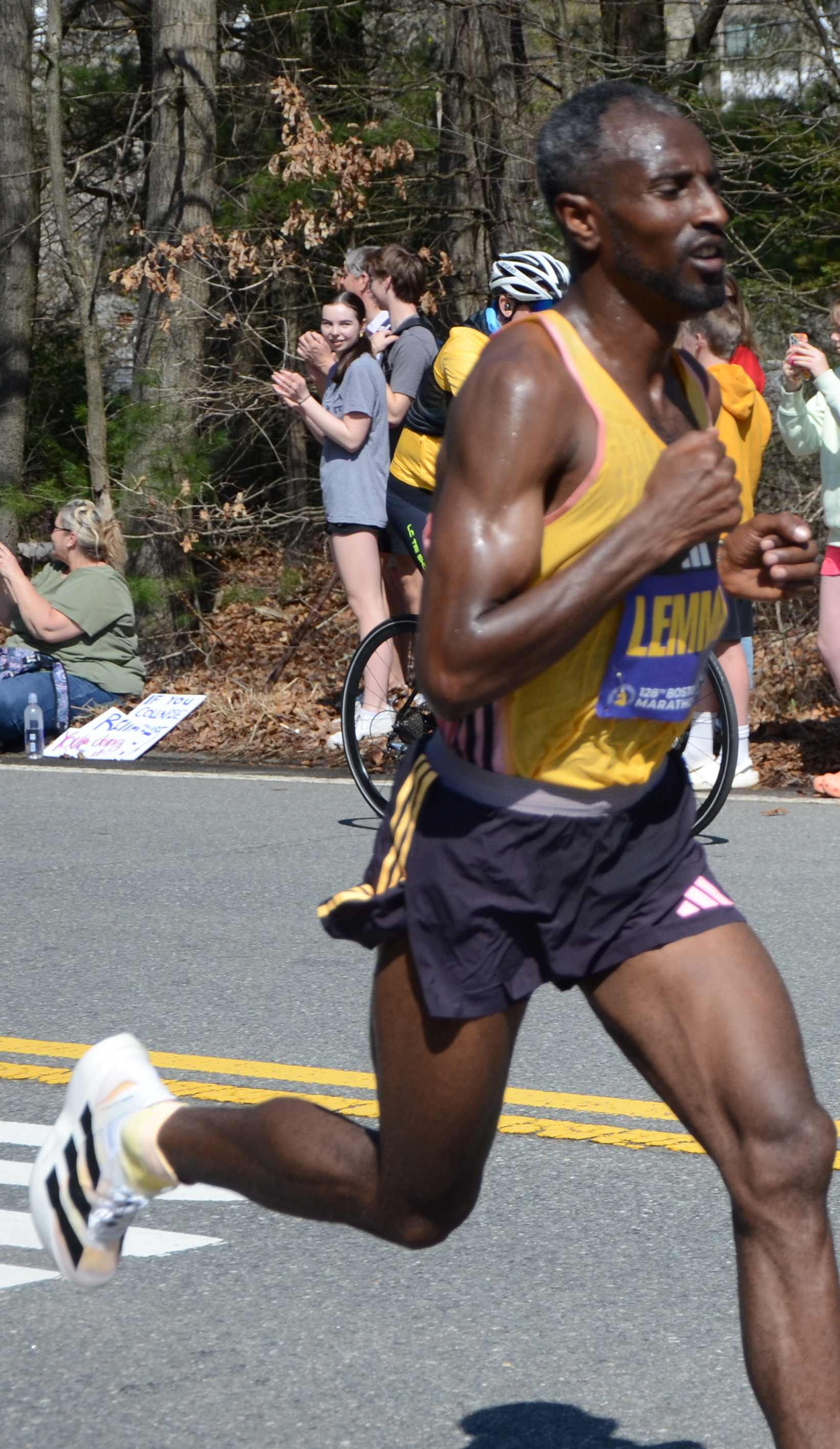
Sisay Lemma, elite men's winner, near the halfway point of the race

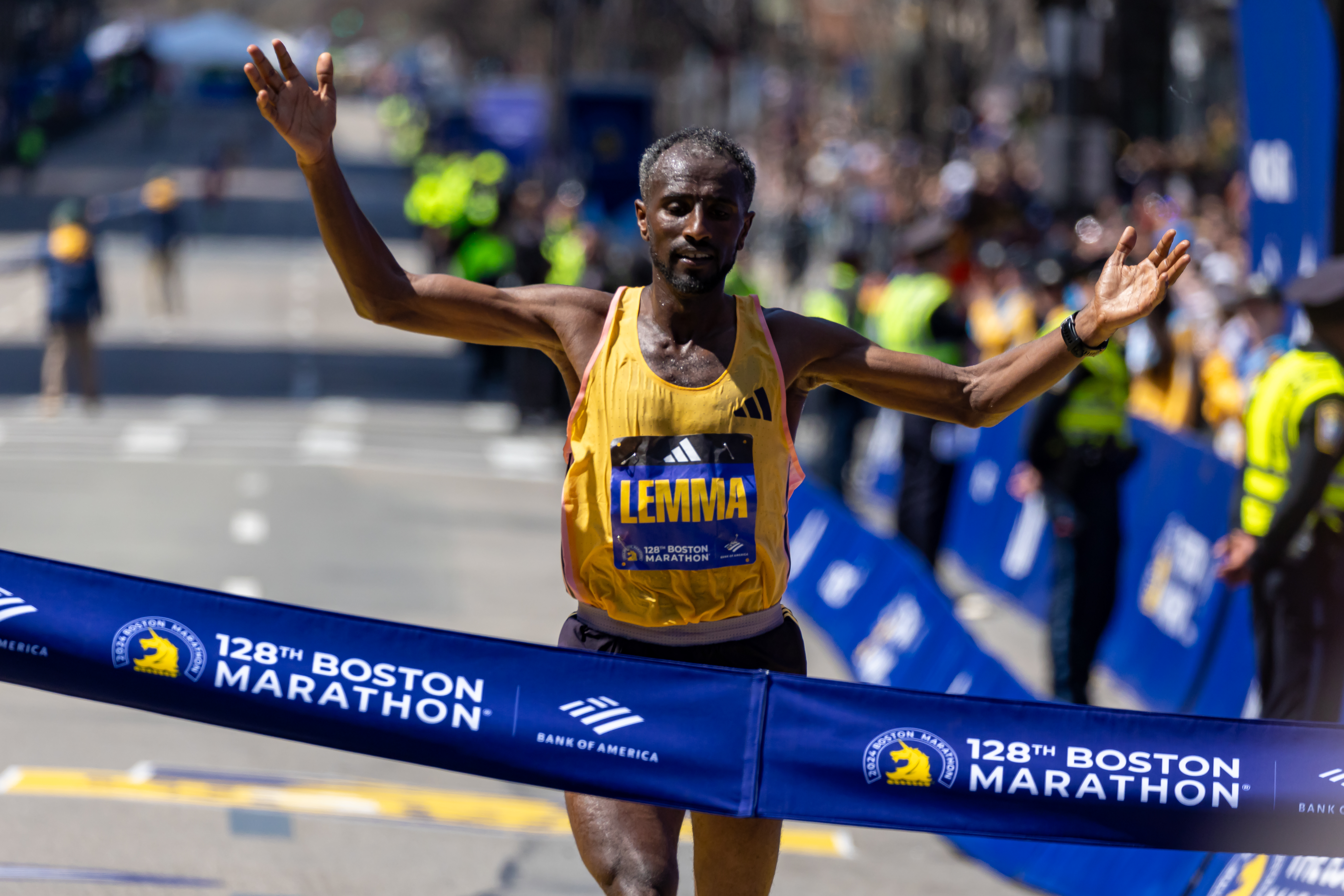
Lemma crossing the finishing line

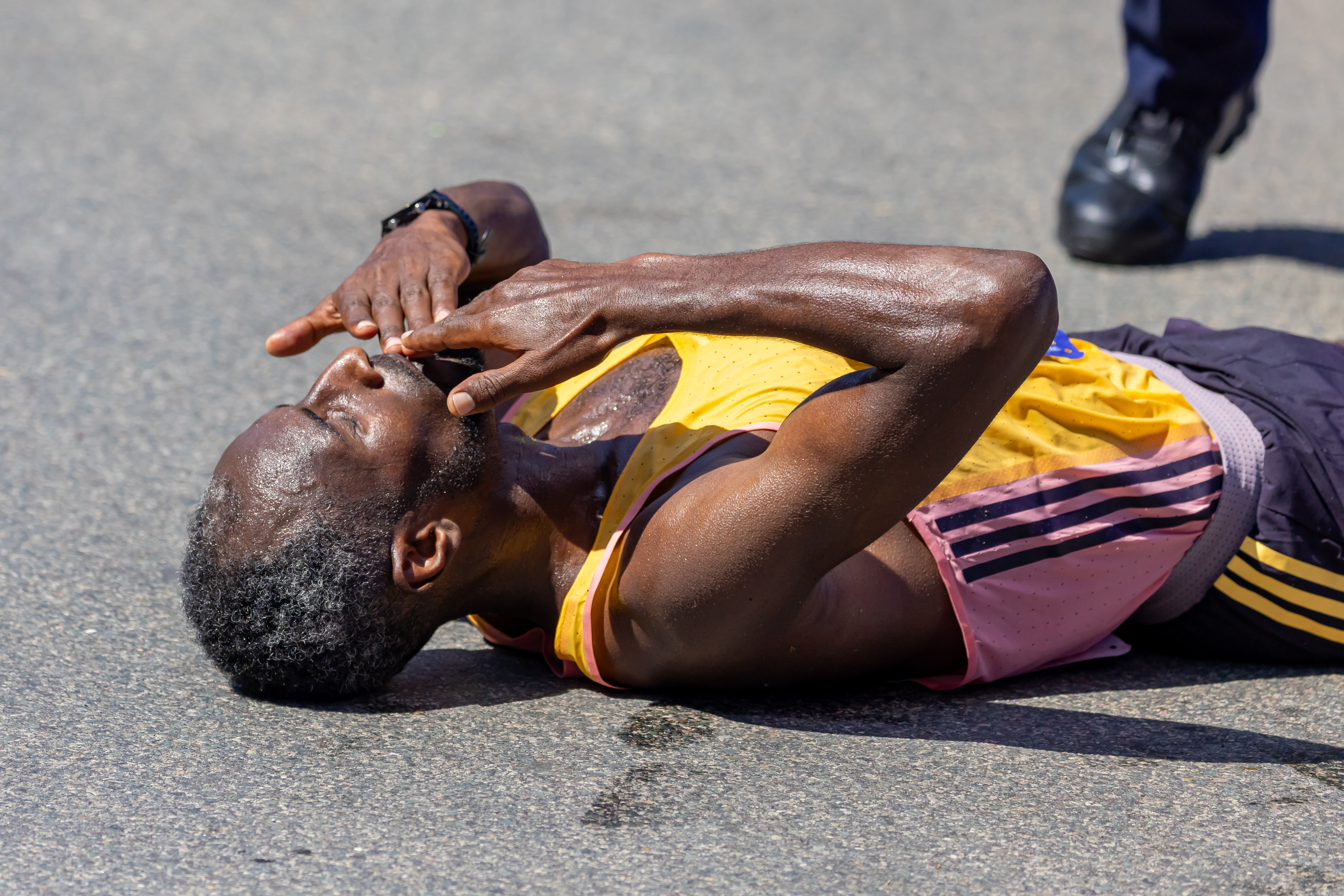
Lemma lies on the ground after finishing the race

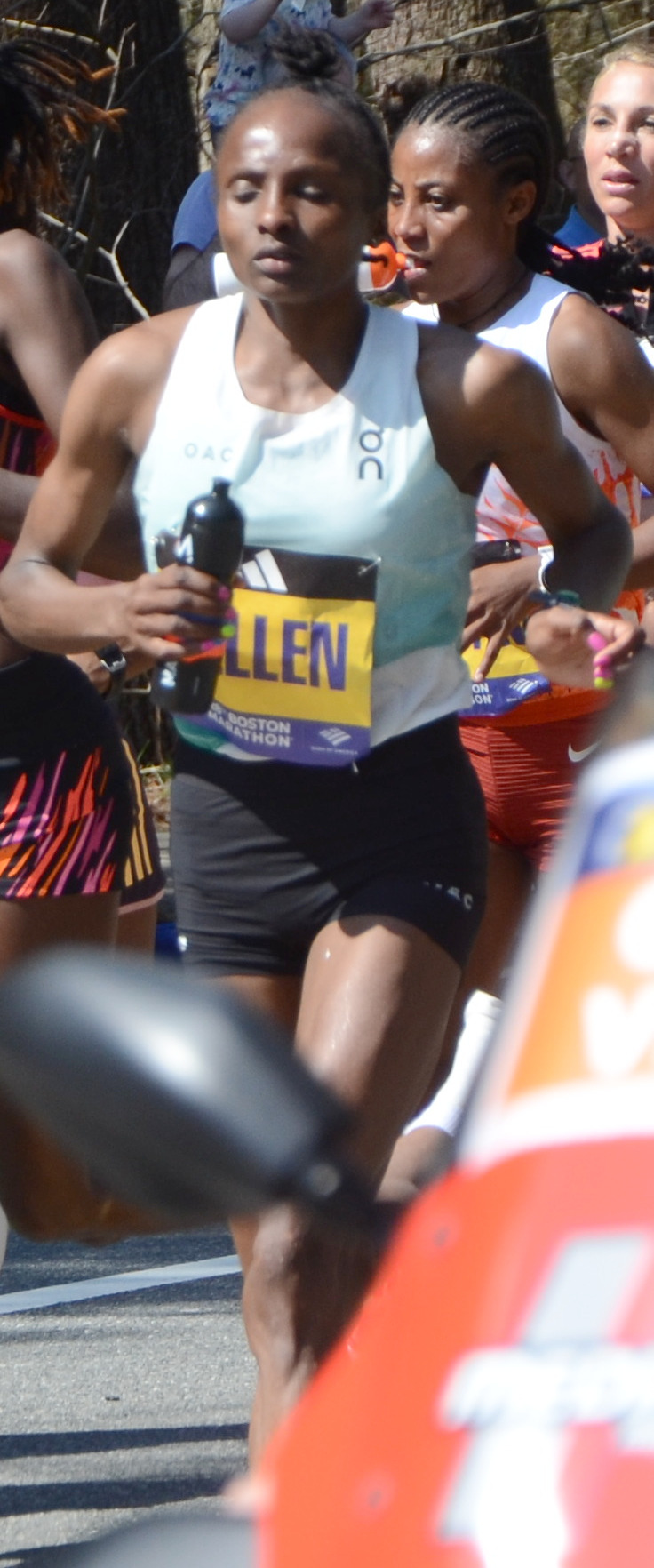
Hellen Obiri, elite women's winner, near the halfway point of the race

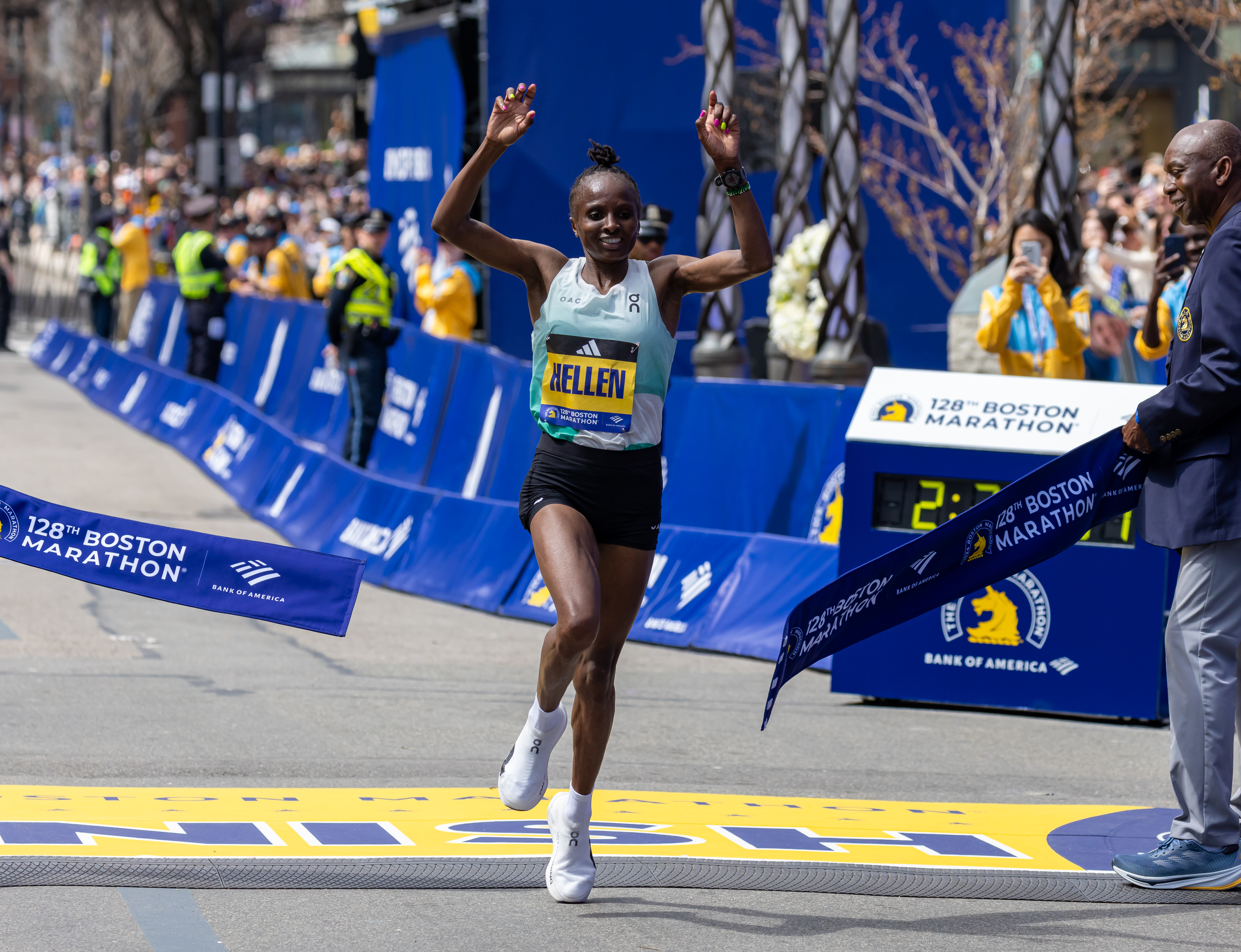
Obri crossing the finishing line

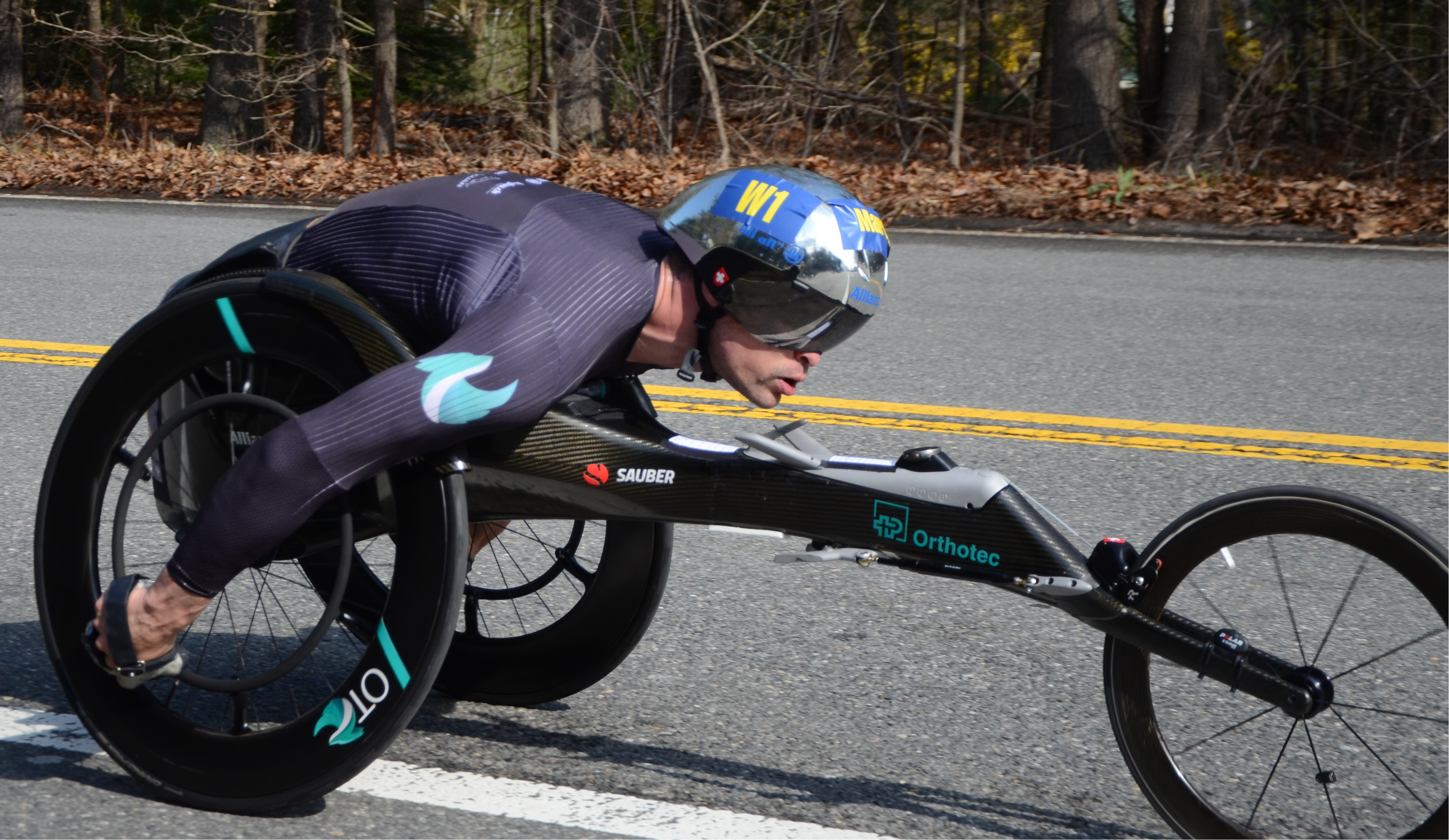
Marcel Hug, men's wheelchair winner, near the halfway point

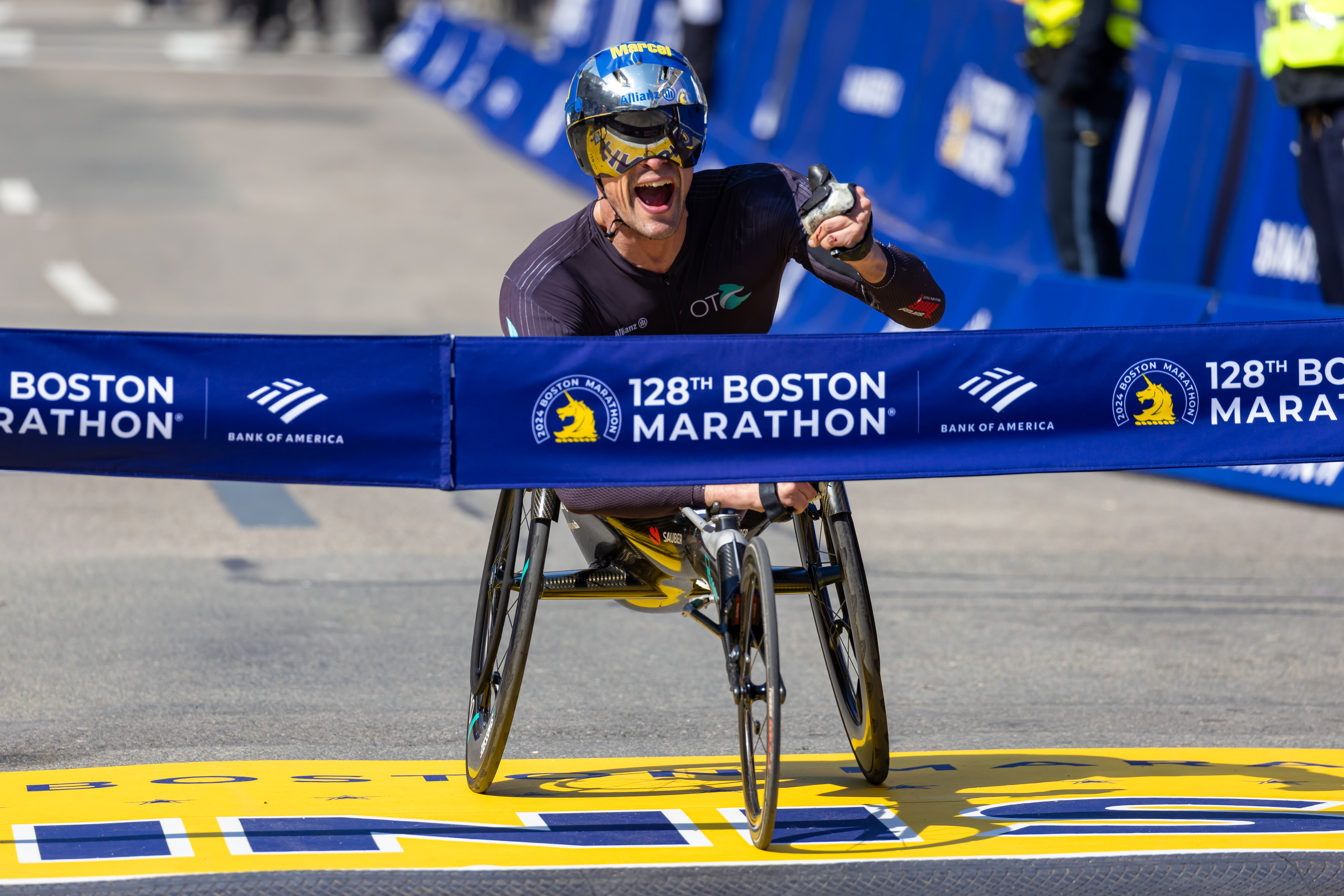
Marcel Hug crossing the finishing line

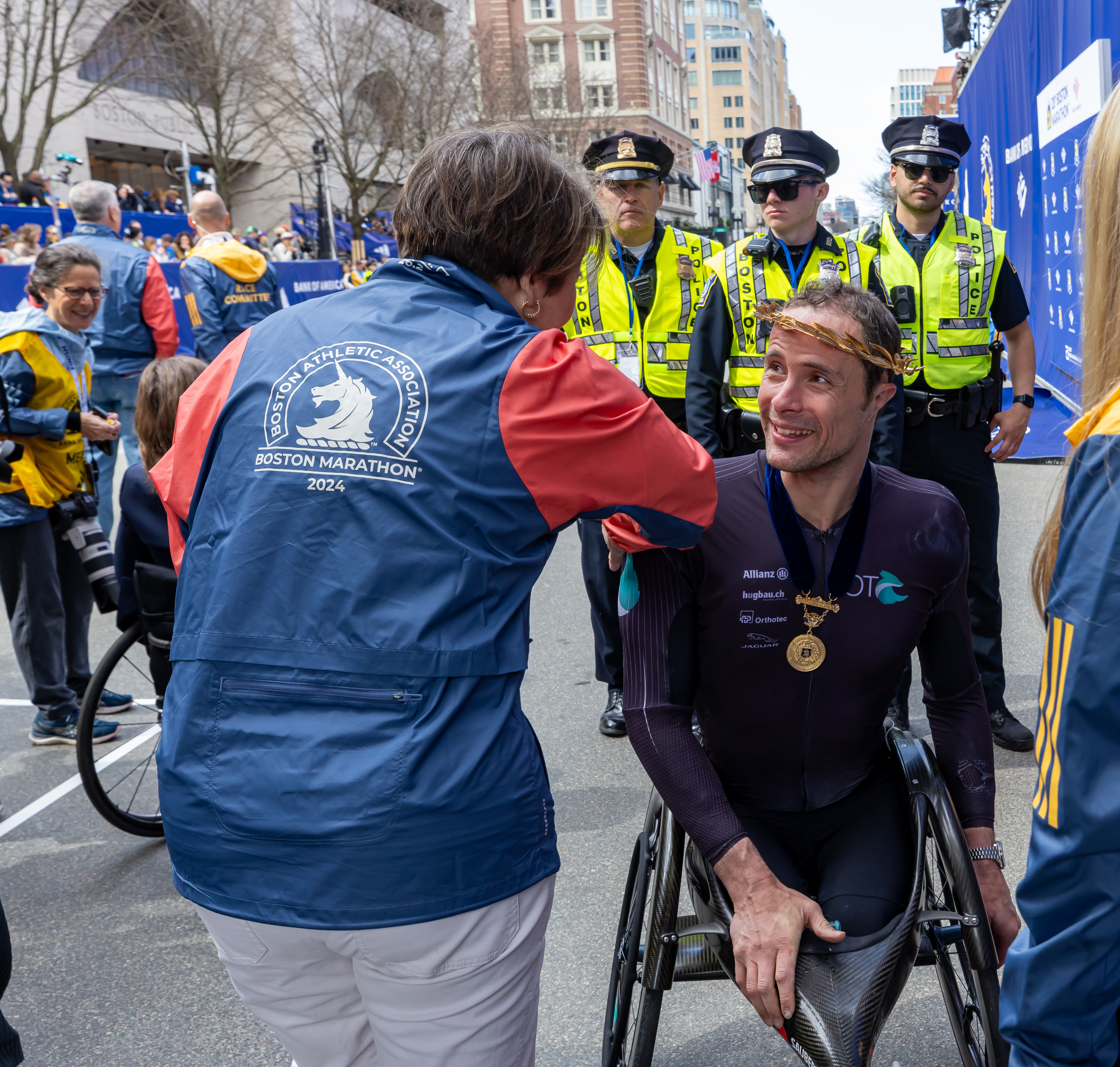
Massachusetts Governor Maura Healey congratulating Hug on his victory

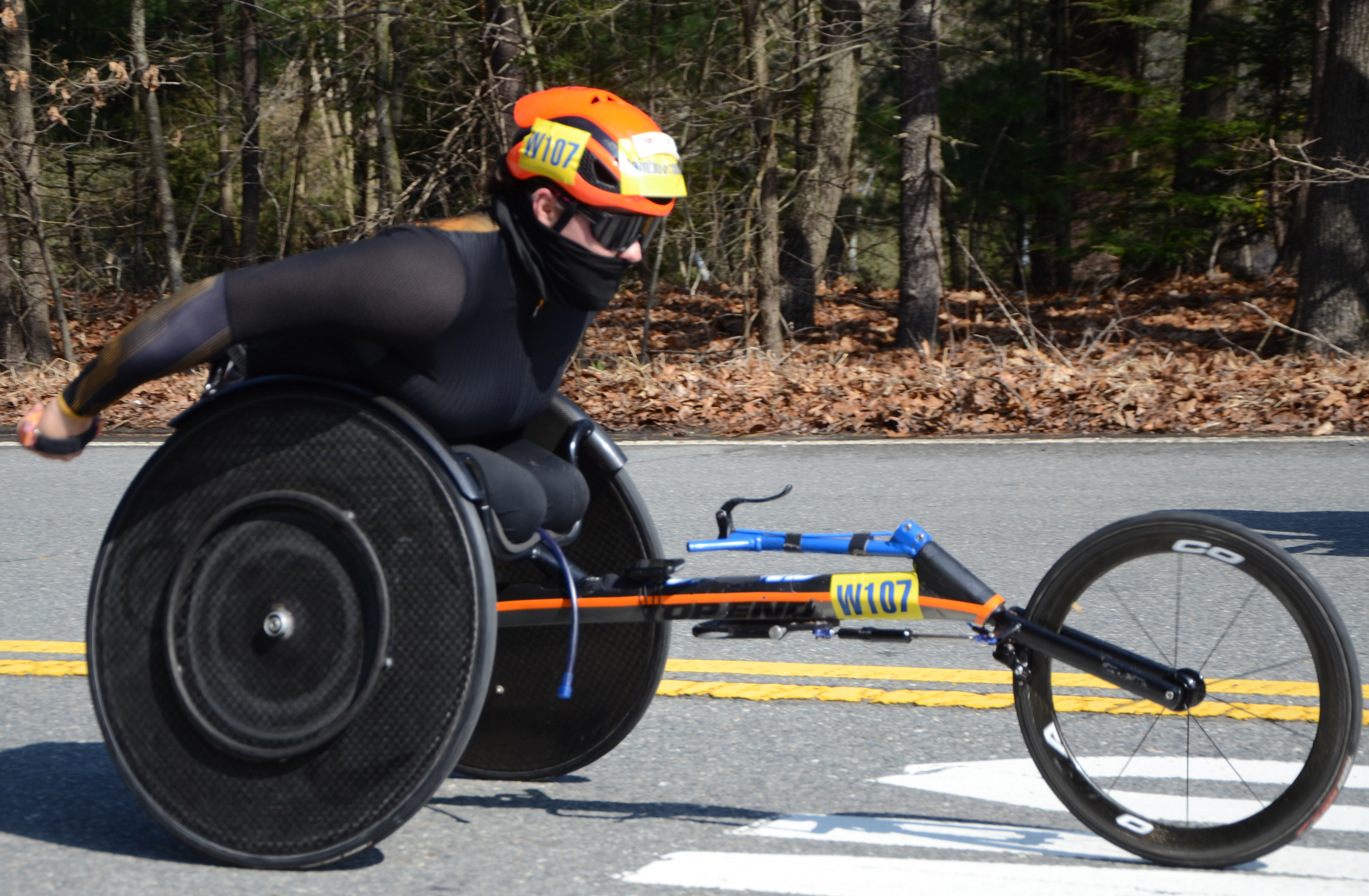
Eden Rainbow-Cooper, women's wheelchair winner, during the race

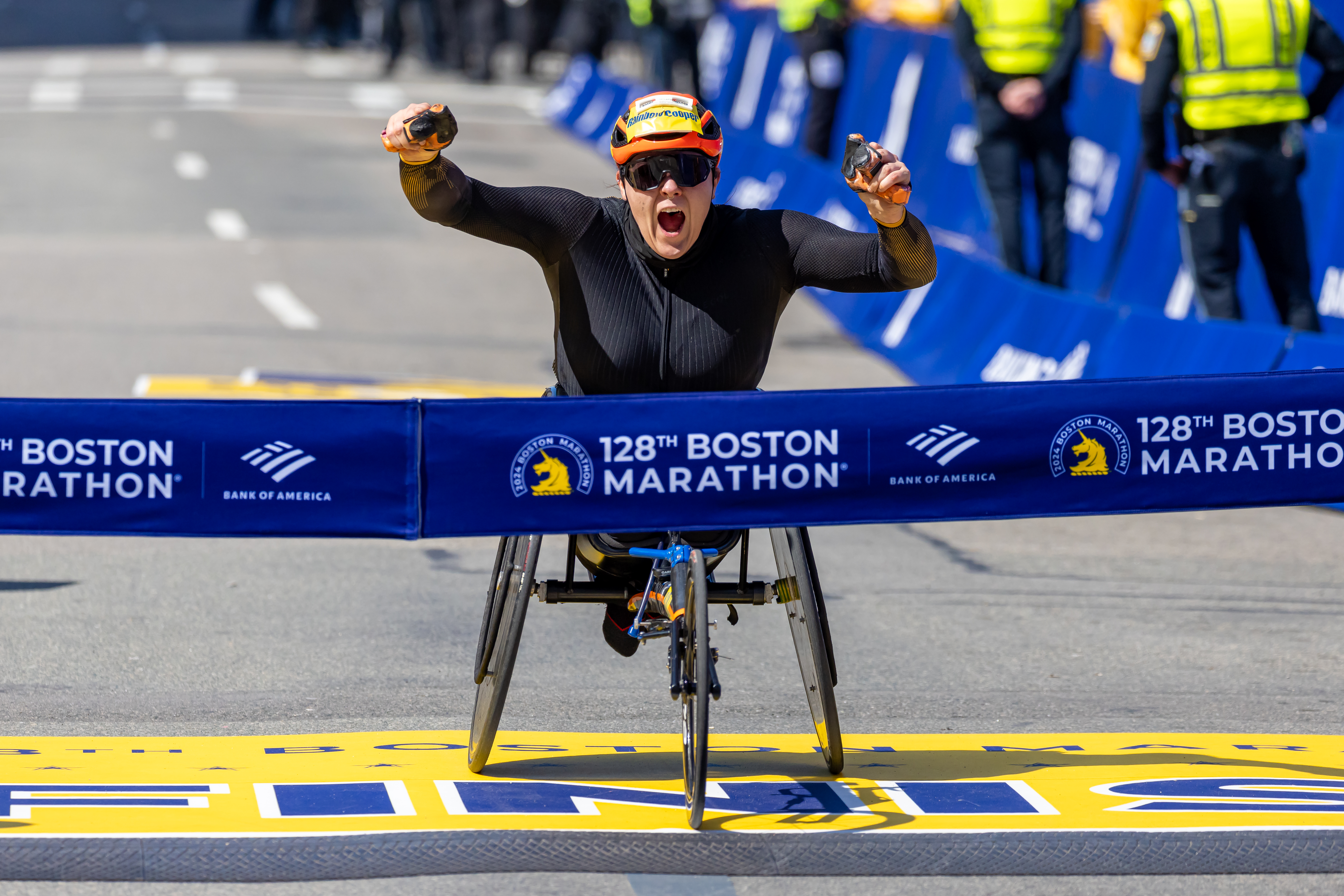
Rainbow-Cooper crossing the finishing line

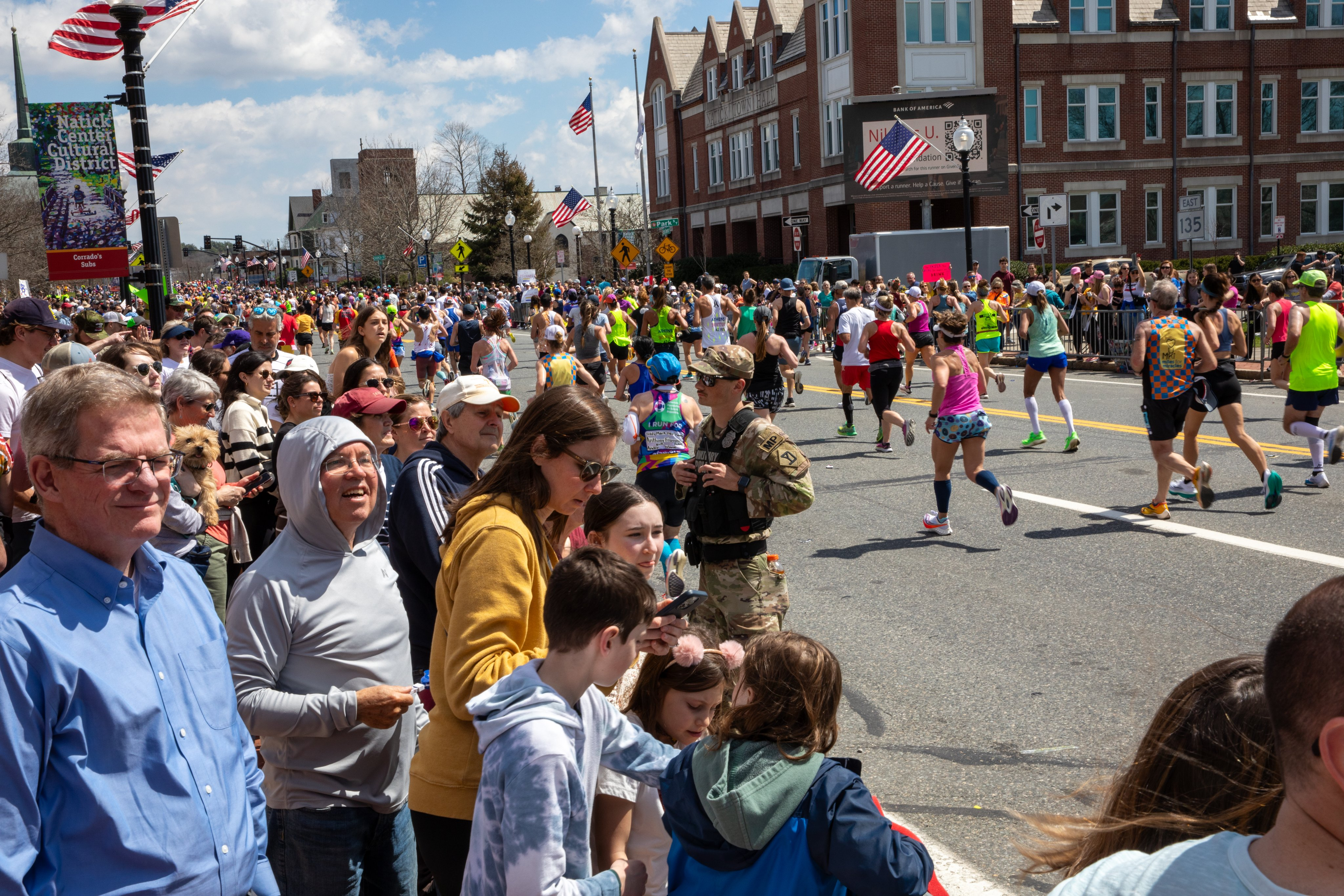
Race passing through Natick, Massachusetts

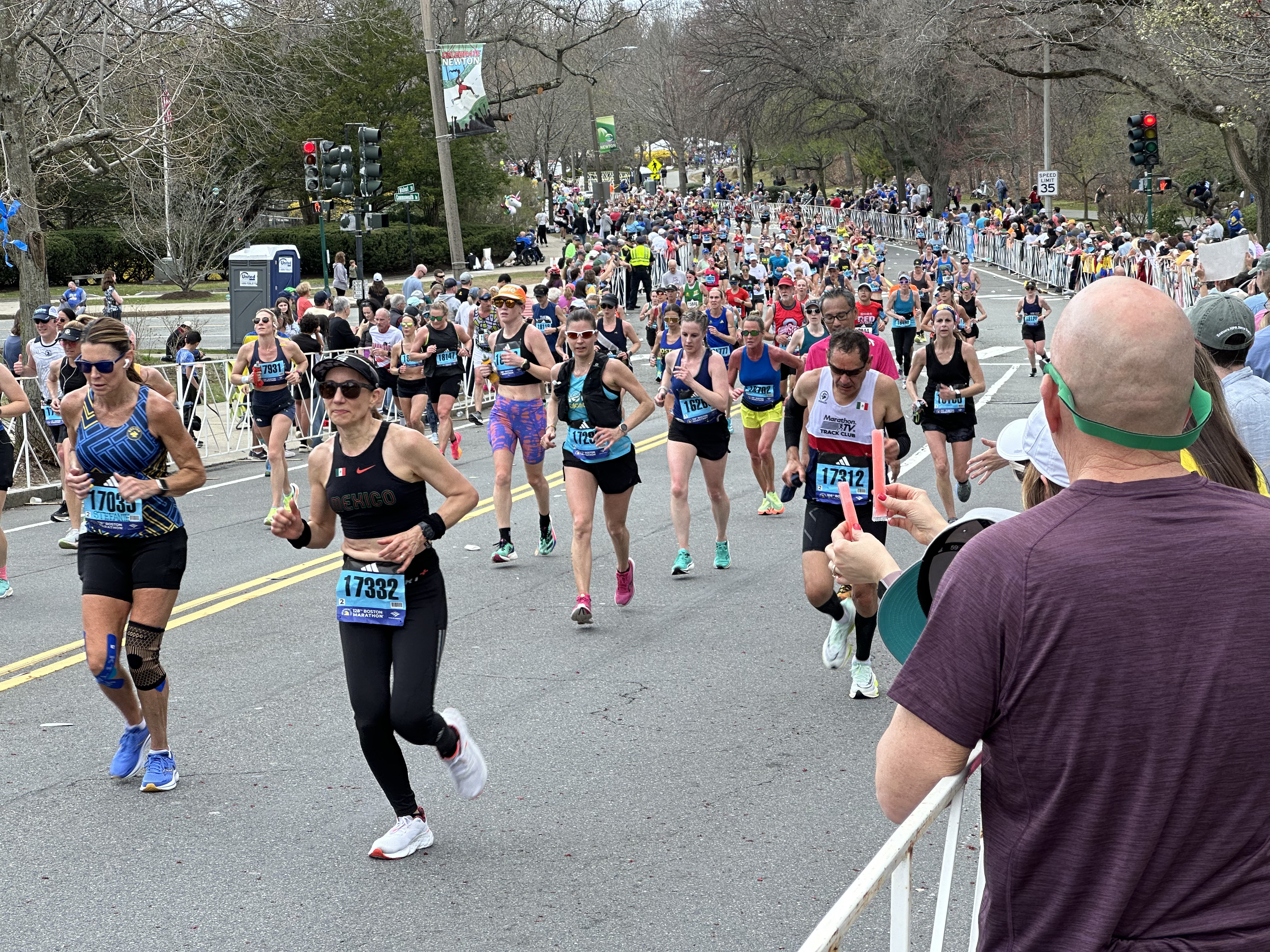
Runners at the intersection of Commonwealth Avenue and Walnut Street in Newton, Massachusetts
