= Sisay Lemma =

Ethiopian long-distance runner

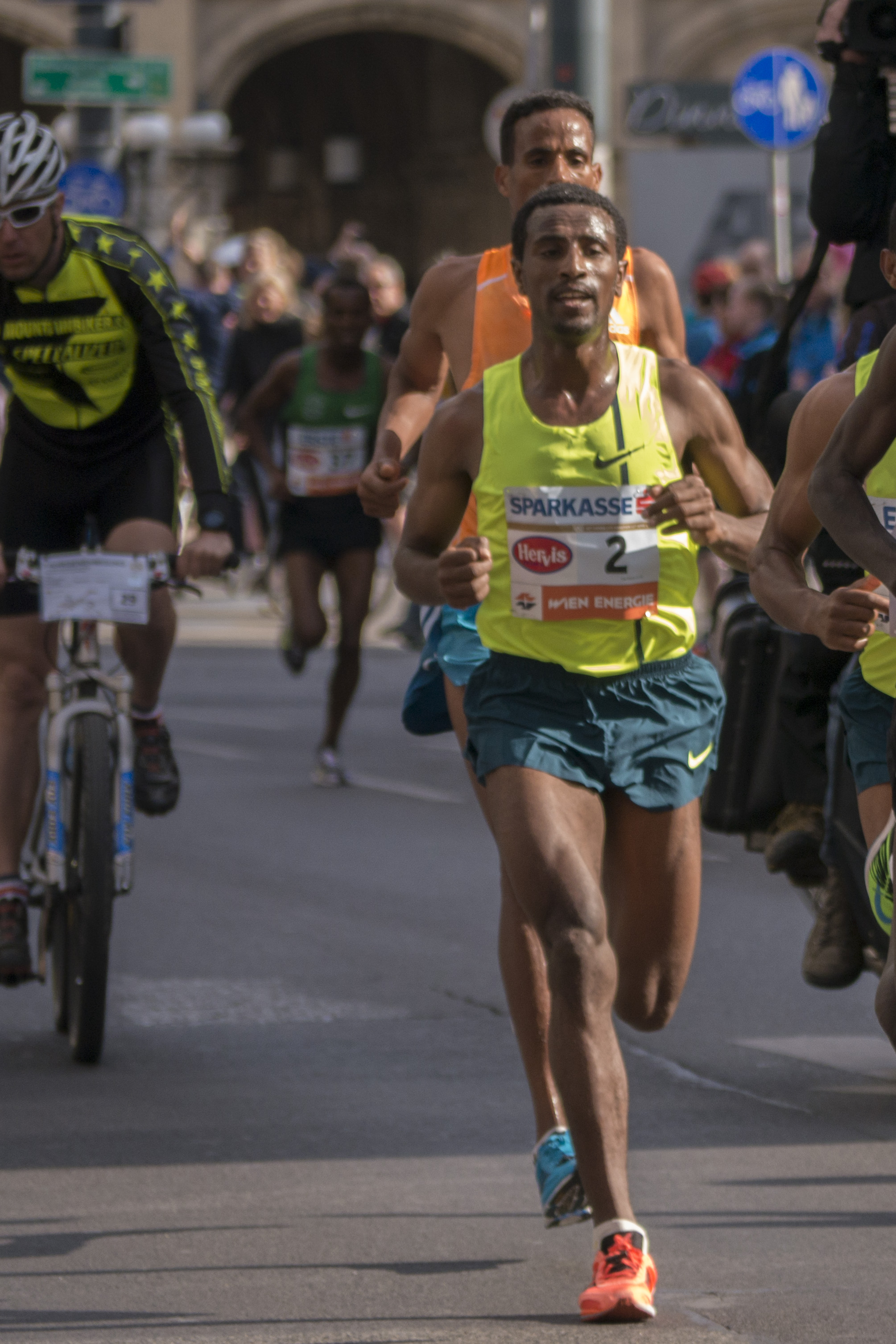
- Lemma during the Vienna City Marathon 2015 at km 10 (Opera)

Personal information
- Full name: Sisay Lemma Kasaye
- Nationality: Ethiopian
- Born: 12 December 1990 (age 35) Cheki, North Shewa, Amhara Region, Ethiopia

Sport
- Sport: Athletics
- Event: Marathon
Medal record
World Marathon Majors
Gold medal – first place	2021 London	Marathon
Gold medal – first place	2024 Boston	Marathon
Bronze medal – third place	2019 Berlin	Marathon
Bronze medal – third place	2020 Tokyo	Marathon
Bronze medal – third place	2020 London	Marathon

Sisay Lemma Kasaye (born 12 December 1990) is an Ethiopian long-distance runner.

== Career ==
Sisay Lemma began his running career at 17 and initially competed barefoot due to a lack of running shoes.

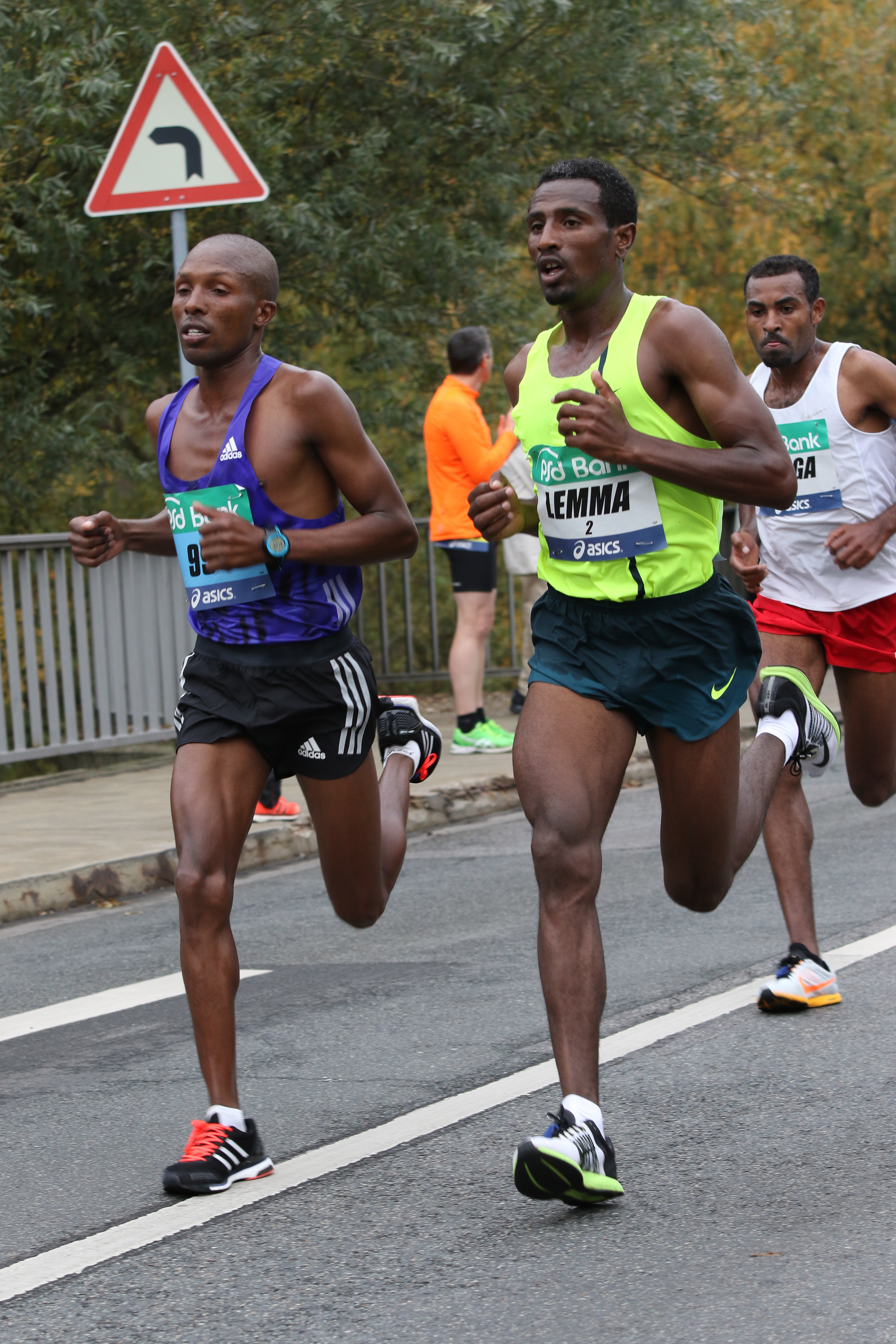
Running in Frankfurt

=== 2012 ===
Sisay won the Maratona d'Italia.

=== 2013 ===
Sisay was fifth in the Tiberias Marathon, won the Orlen Warsaw Marathon and finished fourth at the Eindhoven Marathon.

=== 2015 ===
Sisay was fifth at the Dubai Marathon in January in 2:07:06, won the Vienna City Marathon in April in 2:07:31 and the Frankfurt Marathon in October where he ran a personal best of 2:06:26.

=== 2016 ===
In 2016 he improved his best to 2:05:16 at the Dubai Marathon where he finished fourth.

=== 2017 ===
In 2017, he was third at the Dubai Marathon in January and fourth at the Chicago Marathon in October, but he did not finish the Boston Marathon in April.

=== 2018 ===
In 2018, he began the season with a fifth-place finish at the Dubai Marathon on 26 January, a personal best of 2:04:08. In October, he broke the Ljubljana Marathon record with a time of 2:04:58.

=== 2019 ===
He finished third at the 2019 Berlin Marathon, improving his personal best to 2:03:36.

=== 2020 ===
Lemma finished third at the 2020 Tokyo Marathon on 1 March in 2:04:51. At the 2020 London Marathon, he finished in third place at 2.05:45.

=== 2021 ===
Sisay won the 2021 London Marathon in a time of 2:04:01.

=== 2023 ===
In 2023, he won and set the course record for the Valencia Marathon at 2:01:48, becoming the 4th man to run under 2:02 clocking.

=== 2024 ===
Sisay won the 2024 Boston Marathon at 2:06:17. He led the race from wire-to-wire, finishing 41 seconds ahead of the 2nd-place finisher Mohamed Esa (2:06:58).

Lemma was due to represent Ethiopia in the 2024 Olympic Marathon taking place in Paris, France, but had to pull out due to injury, his replacement Tamirat Tola ultimately winning the gold.

=== World Major Marathons ===
Competition	Rank	Time	Location	Date	Notes
2017 Chicago Marathon	4th	2:11:01	Chicago	2017 Oct 08	World Major Marathon debut
2017 Boston Marathon	DNF		Boston	2017 Apr 17	
2019 Berlin Marathon	3rd	2:03:36	Berlin	2019 Sep 29	Personal best time
2020 Tokyo Marathon	3rd	2:04:51	Tokyo	2020 Mar 1	
2020 London Marathon	3rd	2:05:45	London	2020 Oct 4	
2021 London Marathon	1st	2:04:01	London	2021 Oct 2	First World Major Marathon win
2024 Boston Marathon	1st	2:06:17	Boston	2024 Apr 15	10th fastest time in race history

== Personal bests ==
Outdoor

Event	Time	Date	Place
Half Marathon	1:02:06	23 May 2015	Gothenburg
Marathon	2:01:48	3 December 2023	Valencia
