= Tigist Girma =

Ethiopian athlete (born 1993)

Personal information
- Full name: Tigist Girma Nuramo
- Nationality: Ethiopian
- Born: 12 July 1993 (age 33)

Sport
- Sport: Track and Field
- Event: Marathon

Achievements and titles
- Personal bests: Marathon: 2:18.52 (Valencia, 2022)

Tigist Girma Nuramo (born 12 July 1993) is an Ethiopian athlete specialising in the marathon.

== Early life ==
Girma was born near Sheshemane, in the south east of Ethiopia. She moved to Addis Ababa in 2015.

== Career ==
She won the Beirut Marathon in 2016, and finished second at the Lanzhou Marathon in China in 2017. She won the 2018 Guangshou Marathon and the Ottawa Marathon in 2019.

She ran a 2:19:52 personal best finishing second at the Amsterdam Marathon in 2019, over seven minutes better than her previous personal best. She also finished in the top 10 at the 2020 Tokyo Marathon. In December 2020 at the Valencia Marathon ran a time of 2:19:55. She finished in the top ten at the 2021 London Marathon.

On 1 May 2021, Girma won the Ethiopian Olympic Marathon Trials in Sebeta City. She was named in the Ethiopian squad for the games, however she did not compete.

In September 2022 she won the Sydney Marathon. She ran a personal best time of 2:18:52 at the Valencia Marathon in 2022.
