= 2019 Tokyo Marathon =

Marathon race in Tokyo, Japan

13th Tokyo Marathon
- Venue: Tokyo, Japan
- Dates: 3 March

Champions
- Men: Birhanu Legese (2:04:48)
- Women: Ruti Aga (2:20:40)
- Wheelchair men: Marcel Hug (01:30:44)
- Wheelchair women: Manuela Schär (01:46:57)

The 2019 Tokyo Marathon (Japanese: 東京マラソン 2019) was the thirteenth edition of the annual marathon race in Tokyo and was held on Sunday, 3 March. An IAAF Gold Label Road Race, it was the first World Marathon Majors event to be held that year. The men's race was won by Birhanu Legese in 2:04:48 hours (the second fastest time recorded in Japan) while the women's race was won by Ruti Aga in 2:20:40.

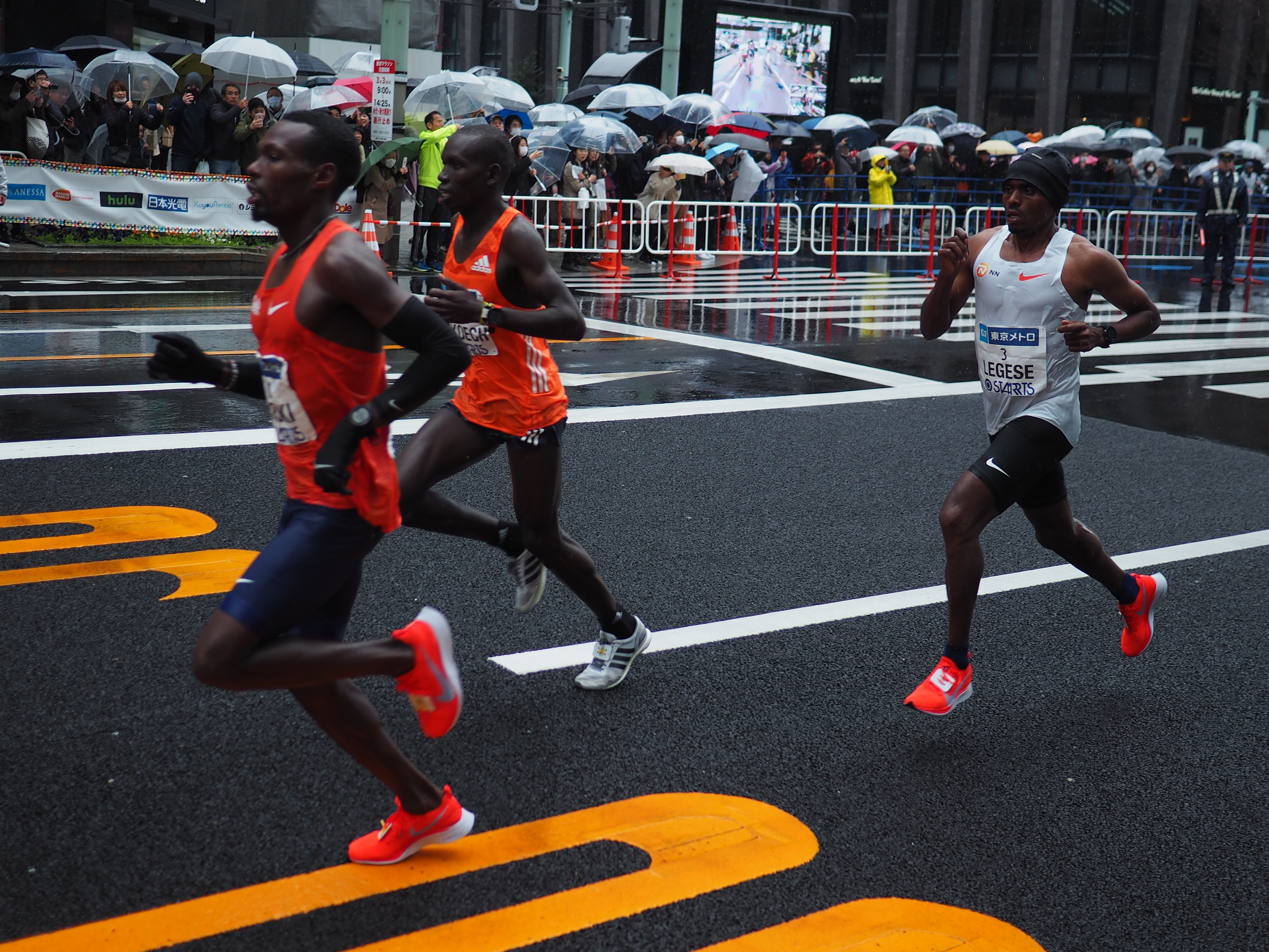
Birhanu Legese (right) behind Bedan Karoki and a pacemaker

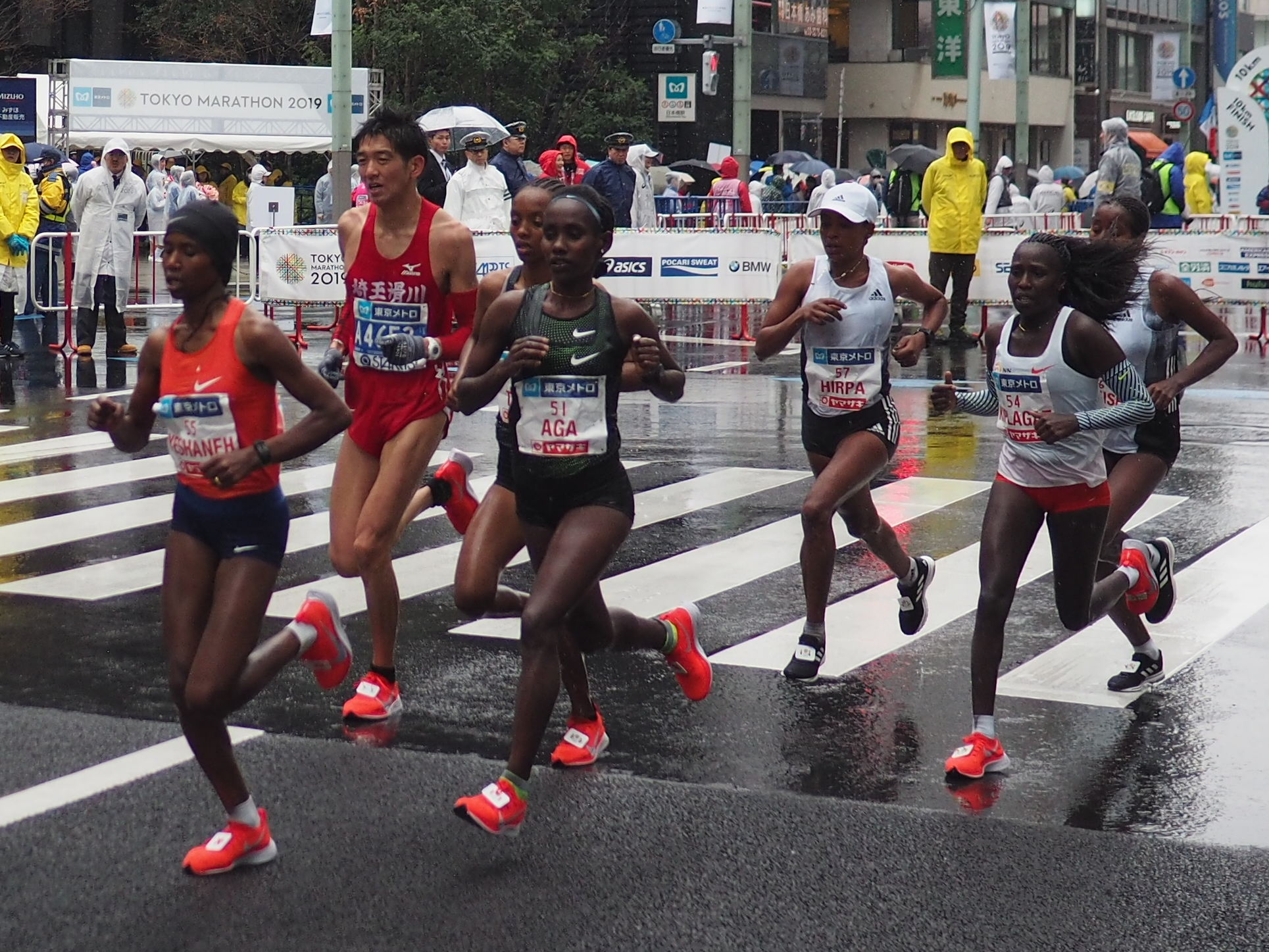
Women's leading group with Ababel Yeshaneh, Ruti Aga, Bedatu Hirpa and Florence Kiplagat

The marathon race had a total of 37,604 starters. Male entrants outnumbered women by more than 3 to 1 (28,664 against 8,905), which was similarly reflected in the wheelchair division with its 26 men and 9 women. In terms of competitive standard, a total of 906 men and 555 women entered with a semi-elite personal best. Of the 35,460 finishers for the marathon that year, the largest contingent was from Tokyo Prefecture (10,387). Around 8500 entrants came from the prefectures of Kanagawa, Saitama and Chiba, which were the only other regions in excess of 1000 entrants. Overseas athletes numbered 7431 – around one fifth of the total. The estimated number of spectators on the course was 690,000.

In terms of the 12th World Marathon Majors rankings, the result brought Birhanu Legese to joint first in the men's side with 25 points while Ruti Aga's win brought her into first place outright with 41 points (building upon her runner-up finish at the 2018 Berlin Marathon). In the wheelchair division, Daniel Romanchuk kept a two-point lead over Marcel Hug and Manuela Schär extended her lead to 76 points, ahead of Tatyana McFadden.

It was a cold and wet edition of the race, with temperatures holding steady around 5 to 6 degrees celsius. This resulted in several high profile mid-race dropouts, including Japan's national record holder Suguru Osako and elite Africans El Hassan El-Abbassi and Gideon Kipketer.

For the Japanese elite runners, the marathon formed part of qualification into the Japanese team for the 2020 Tokyo Olympics. Kensuke Horio was the top male national finisher and, along with Masato Imai and Takuya Fujikawa, gained a place for the Marathon Grand Championship race scheduled for September. None of the women in the race gained qualification in Tokyo, leaving the Nagoya Women's Marathon and Lake Biwa Marathon as the final venues to do so.

== Results ==
=== Men ===
Position	Athlete	Nationality	Time
1st place, gold medalist(s)	Birhanu Legese	Ethiopia	2:04:48
2nd place, silver medalist(s)	Bedan Karoki	Kenya	2:06:48
3rd place, bronze medalist(s)	Dickson Chumba	Kenya	2:08:44
4	Simon Kariuki	Kenya	2:09:41
5	Kensuke Horio	Japan	2:10:21
6	Masato Imai	Japan	2:10:30
7	Takuya Fujikawa	Japan	2:10:35
8	Daichi Kamino	Japan	2:11:05
9	Ryu Takaku	Japan	2:11:49
10	Tadashi Isshiki	Japan	2:12:21
11	Shohei Otsuka	Japan	2:12:36
12	Ryo Kuchimachi	Japan	2:13:30
13	Yuki Munakata	Japan	2:13:47
14	Keita Shitara	Japan	2:14:41
15	Shogo Nakamura	Japan	2:14:52
16	Yuki Sato	Japan	2:15:07
17	Hiroto Kanamuri	Japan	2:15:37
18	Toshiki Sadakata	Japan	2:15:53
19	Hiroto Kunishi	Japan	2:15:59
20	Hidenori Nagai	Japan	2:16:08

=== Women ===
Position	Athlete	Nationality	Time
1st place, gold medalist(s)	Ruti Aga	Ethiopia	2:20:40
2nd place, silver medalist(s)	Helen Tola	Ethiopia	2:21:01
3rd place, bronze medalist(s)	Shure Demise	Ethiopia	2:21:05
4	Florence Kiplagat	Kenya	2:21:50
5	Bedatu Hirpa	Ethiopia	2:23:43
6	Ababel Yeshaneh	Ethiopia	2:24:02
7	Mao Ichiyama	Japan	2:24:33
8	Joan Chelimo	Kenya	2:26:24
9	Rose Chelimo	Bahrain	2:30:35
10	Ruth Chebitok	Kenya	2:31:19
11	Yebrgual Melese	Ethiopia	2:31:40
12	Honami Maeda	Japan	2:31:42
13	Hiroko Yoshitomi	Japan	2:32:30
14	Mao Kiyota	Japan	2:33:04
15	Haruka Yamaguchi	Japan	2:33:41
16	Mimi Belete	Bahrain	2:35:04
17	Tsao Chunyu	Chinese Taipei	2:36:14 NR
18	Yoshiko Sakamoto	Japan	2:36:16
19	Shiho Satonaka	Japan	2:36:37
20	Keiko Nogami	Japan	2:38:23

=== Wheelchair men ===
Position	Athlete	Nationality	Time
1st place, gold medalist(s)	Marcel Hug	Switzerland	1:30:44
2nd place, silver medalist(s)	Daniel Romanchuk	United States	1:34:26
3rd place, bronze medalist(s)	Ernst van Dyk	South Africa	1:34:41
4	Kota Hikonoue	Japan	1:35:39
5	Josh Cassidy	Canada	1:36:22
6	Tomoki Suzuki	Japan	1:36:50
7	Ryota Yoshida	Japan	1:40:40
8	Masazumi Soejima	Japan	1:41:04
9	Hiroyuki Yamamoto	Japan	1:43:08
10	Takashi Yoshida	Japan	1:43:16

=== Wheelchair women ===
Position	Athlete	Nationality	Time
1st place, gold medalist(s)	Manuela Schär	Switzerland	1:46:57
2nd place, silver medalist(s)	Tatyana McFadden	United States	1:48:54
3rd place, bronze medalist(s)	Susannah Scaroni	United States	1:54:32
4	Margriet van den Broek	Netherlands	1:57:52
5	Kazumi Nakayama	Japan	2:03:40
