= Ashete Bekere =

Ethiopian marathon runner (born 1988)

Ashete Dido
Personal information
- Full name: Ashete Bekere Dido
- Nationality: Ethiopian
- Born: 17 April 1988 (age 38)

Sport
- Country: Ethiopia
- Sport: Athletics
- Event: Long-distance running
- Team: NN Running Team
Medal record
Women's athletics
Representing Ethiopia
World Marathon Majors
Gold medal – first place	2019 Berlin	Marathon
Bronze medal – third place	2023 Tokyo	Marathon

Ashete Bekere Dido (Note: In some sources: Ashete Bekele Dido) (born 17 April 1988) is an Ethiopian marathon runner. In 2019, she won the Berlin Marathon with a time of 2:20:14.

In 2019, she also won the Rotterdam Marathon in Rotterdam, Netherlands with a time of 2:22:55.

== Career ==
In 2016, she won the České Budějovice Half Marathon held in České Budějovice, Czech Republic with a time of 1:10:40.

In 2020, she finished in 4th place in the women's race at the 2020 London Marathon held in London, United Kingdom.

In 2021, she finished 3rd in the 2021 London Marathon with a time of 2:18:18.

She competed in the women's marathon at the 2022 World Athletics Championships held in Eugene, Oregon, United States.

== Achievements ==
Year	Competition	Venue	Position	Event	Notes
Representing Ethiopia
2013	Tiberias Marathon	Sea of Galilee, Israel	1st	Marathon	2:40:22
2013	Košice Peace Marathon	Košice, Slovakia	1st	Marathon	2:27:47
2016	České Budějovice Half Marathon	České Budějovice, Czech Republic	1st	Half marathon	1:10:40
2018	Valencia Marathon	Valencia, Spain	1st	Marathon	2:21:14
2019	Rotterdam Marathon	Rotterdam, Netherlands	1st	Marathon	2:22:55
2019	Berlin Marathon	Berlin, Germany	1st	Marathon	2:20:14
2021	London Marathon	London, United Kingdom	3rd	Marathon	2:18:18
