= Athletics at the 2020 Summer Paralympics – Women's 1500 metres T54 =

Women's 1500 metres T54 at the XVI Paralympic Games
- Venue: Tokyo National Stadium
- Dates: 30 August 2021 (heats); 31 August 2021 (final)
- Competitors: 13 from 9 nations
- Winning time: 3:27.63

Medalists
1st place, gold medalist(s)		Zhou Zhaoqian	China
2nd place, silver medalist(s)		Manuela Schär	Switzerland
3rd place, bronze medalist(s)		Madison de Rozario	Australia

The women's 1500 metres T54 event at the 2020 Summer Paralympics in Tokyo took place between 30 and 31 August 2021.

The T54 category is for wheelchair athletes with no leg function, but near full arm function and reasonable to normal trunk function. Typically this may be caused by a lower spinal cord injury or spinal cord birth defect.

== Records ==
Prior to the competition, the existing records were as follows:

World Record	Manuela Schär (SUI)	3:12.35	Nottwil, Switzerland	9 August 2020
Paralympic Record	Tatyana McFadden (USA)	3:22.50	Rio de Janeiro, Brazil	13 September 2016

Area	Time	Athlete	Nation
Africa	3:30.51	Marie Emmanuelle Anais Alphonse	Mauritius
America	3:13.27	Tatyana McFadden	United States
Asia	3:24.88	Ma Jing	China
Europe	3:12.35 WR	Manuela Schär	Switzerland
Oceania	3:13.27	Madison de Rozario	Australia

== Results ==
=== Heats ===
Heat 1 took place on 30 August 2021, at 21:26:

Rank	Athlete	Nation	Class	Time	Notes
1	Tatyana McFadden	United States	T54	3:36.24	Q
2	Zhou Zhaoqian	China	T54	3:36.40	Q, SB
3	Merle Menje	Germany	T54	3:36.46	Q
4	Madison de Rozario	Australia	T53	3:36.49	q
5	Patricia Eachus	Switzerland	T54	3:37.43	
6	Jenna Fesemyer	United States	T54	3:37.56	

Heat 2 will take place on 30 August 2021, at 21:34:

Rank	Athlete	Nation	Class	Time	Notes
1	Susannah Scaroni	United States	T54	3:23.42	Q
2	Manuela Schär	Switzerland	T54	3:28.32	Q
3	Zou Lihong	Chile	T54	3:28.68	Q, SB
4	Nikita den Boer	Netherlands	T54	3:28.87	q
5	Marie Emmanuelle Anais Alphonse	Mauritius	T54	3:29.66	q, AR
6	Vanessa Cristina	Brazil	T54	3:30.06	q, SB
7	Jessica Frotten	Canada	T53	3:52.23	

=== Final ===
The final took place on 31 August 2021, at 20:56:

Rank	Athlete	Nation	Class	Time	Notes
1st place, gold medalist(s)	Zhou Zhaoqian	China	T54	3:27.63	PB
2nd place, silver medalist(s)	Manuela Schär	Switzerland	T54	3:28.01	
3rd place, bronze medalist(s)	Madison de Rozario	Australia	T53	3:28.24	
4	Merle Menje	Germany	T54	3:28.64	
5	Tatyana McFadden	United States	T54	3:28.85	
6	Zou Lihong	China	T54	3:29.07	
7	Nikita den Boer	Netherlands	T54	3:29.11	
8	Vanessa Cristina	Brazil	T54	3:30.55	
9	Susannah Scaroni	United States	T54	3:35.53	
10	Marie Emmanuelle Anais Alphonse	Mauritius	T54	3:39.83	
