= 2019 World Para Athletics Championships – Women's 5000 metres =

The women's 5000 metres at the 2019 World Para Athletics Championships was held in Dubai on 13 November 2019.

== Medalists ==
Event	Gold		Silver		Bronze	
T54	Zou Lihong; China	12:12.73	Madison de Rozario; Australia	12:14.62	Susannah Scaroni; United States	12:15.57
WR world record | AR area record | CR championship record | GR games record | NR national record | OR Olympic record | PB personal best | SB season best | WL world leading (in a given season)

== T54 ==
=== Records ===
World record	Manuela Schär (SUI)	10:51.17	Arbon, Switzerland	5 August 2018
Championship record	Manuela Schär (SUI)	11:51.98	Lyon, France	20 July 2013

=== Final ===
The final was started on 13 November at 19:36.

Rank	Lane	Sport Class	Name	Nationality	Time	Notes
1st place, gold medalist(s)	9	T54	Zou Lihong	China	12:12.73	
2nd place, silver medalist(s)	11	T53	Madison de Rozario	Australia	12:14.62	
3rd place, bronze medalist(s)	6	T54	Susannah Scaroni	United States	12:15.57	
	5	T54	Nikita den Boer	Netherlands	12:16.00	
	2	T54	Roy Diane	Canada	12:16.22	
	10	T54	Patricia Eachus	Switzerland	12:16.25	
	4	T53	Jessica Frotten	Canada	12:17.43	SB
	8	T53	Chelsea McClammer	United States	12:17.54	
	3	T54	Eliza Ault-Connell	Australia	12:17.79	Yellow card
	1	T54	Arielle Rausin	United States	13:12.11	
	7	T54	Marie Emmanuelle Anais Alphonse	Mauritius	14:25.01	

== See also ==
- List of IPC world records in athletics
