= Athletics at the 2020 Summer Paralympics – Women's marathon =

The Women's marathon athletics events for the 2020 Summer Paralympics took place in Tokyo on September 5, 2021. A total of 2 events were contested over this distance.

== Medal summary ==
The following is a summary of the medals awarded across all marathon events.

Classification	Gold		Silver		Bronze	
T12	Misato Michishita; Japan	3:00:50 GR	Elena Pautova; RPC	3:04:16	Louzanne Coetzee; South Africa	3:11:13 WR (T11)
T54	Madison de Rozario; Australia	1:38:11 GR (T53)	Manuela Schär; Switzerland	1:38:12	Nikita den Boer; Netherlands	1:38:16
