= Athletics at the 2020 Summer Paralympics – Women's marathon T54 =

Women's marathon T54 at the XVI Paralympic Games
- Venue: Tokyo National Stadium
- Dates: 5 September 2021
- Competitors: 16 from 7 nations

Medalists
1st place, gold medalist(s)		Madison de Rozario	Australia
2nd place, silver medalist(s)		Manuela Schär	Switzerland
3rd place, bronze medalist(s)		Nikita den Boer	Netherlands

The women's marathon T54 event at the 2020 Summer Paralympics in Tokyo, took place on 5 September 2021.

The T54 category is for wheelchair athletes with no leg function, but near full arm function and reasonable to normal trunk function. Typically this may be caused by a lower spinal cord injury or spinal cord birth defect.

== Records ==
Prior to the competition, the existing records were as follows:

World Record	Manuela Schär (SUI)	1:35:42	Ōita, Japan	17 November 2019
Paralympic Record	Tatyana McFadden (USA); Zou Lihong (CHN)	1:38:44	Rio de Janeiro, Brazil	18 September 2016

Area	Time	Athlete	Nation
Africa	1:57:19	Masouda Siffi	Tunisia
America	1:36:26	Susannah Scaroni	United States
Asia	1:35:50	Tsubasa Kina	Japan
Europe	1:35:42 WR	Manuela Schär	Switzerland
Oceania	1:42:59	Christie Dawes	Australia

== Results ==
The race took place on 5 September 2021, at 6:40:

Rank	Name	Nationality	Class	Time	Notes
1st place, gold medalist(s)	Madison de Rozario	Australia	T53	1:38:11	GR (T53)
2nd place, silver medalist(s)	Manuela Schär	Switzerland	T54	1:38:12	SB
3rd place, bronze medalist(s)	Nikita den Boer	Netherlands	T54	1:38:16	PB
4	Wakako Tsuchida	Japan	T54	1:38:32	SB
5	Tatyana McFadden	United States	T54	1:40:14	SB
6	Susannah Scaroni	United States	T54	1:41:04	SB
7	Tsubasa Kina	Japan	T54	1:42:33	SB
8	Christie Dawes	Australia	T54	1:46:44	SB
9	Patricia Eachus	Switzerland	T54	1:47:06	PB
10	Zou Lihong	China	T54	1:49:02	SB
11	Jenna Fesemyer	United States	T54	1:50:06	SB
12	Vanessa Cristina de Souza	Brazil	T54	1:51:12	SB
13	Eliza Ault-Connell	Australia	T54	1:52:26	SB
14	Zhou Zhaoqian	China	T54	1:55:46	SB
15	Amanda McGrory	United States	T54	1:57:11	SB
16	Gao Fang	China	T53	2:14:34	SB
