= Switzerland at the 2020 Summer Paralympics =

- Flag of Switzerland
- IPC code: SUI
- NPC: Swiss Paralympic Committee
- Website: www.swissparalympic.ch

in Tokyo, Japan August 24, 2021 – September 5, 2021
- Competitors: 20 in 9 sports
- Medals: Gold 7 Silver 4 Bronze 3 Total 14

Summer Paralympics appearances (overview)
- 1960; 1964; 1968; 1972; 1976; 1980; 1984; 1988; 1992; 1996; 2000; 2004; 2008; 2012; 2016; 2020; 2024

Switzerland competed at the 2020 Summer Paralympics in Tokyo, Japan, from 24 August to 5 September 2021.

== Medalists ==
Medal	Name	Sport	Event	Date
Gold	Marcel Hug	Athletics	Men's 5000 metres T54	28 August
Gold	Manuela Schär	Athletics	Women's 800 metres T54	29 August
Gold	Marcel Hug	Athletics	Men's 1500 metres T54	31 August
Gold	Catherine Debrunner	Athletics	Women's 400 metres T53	2 September
Gold	Manuela Schär	Athletics	Women's 400 metres T54	2 September
Gold	Marcel Hug	Athletics	Men's 800 metres T54	2 September
Gold	Marcel Hug	Athletics	Men's marathon T54	5 September
Silver	Manuela Schär	Athletics	Women's 5000 metres T54	28 August
Silver	Manuela Schär	Athletics	Women's 1500 metres T54	31 August
Silver	Heinz Frei	Cycling	Men's road race H3	1 September
Silver	Manuela Schär	Athletics	Women's marathon T54	5 September
Bronze	Catherine Debrunner	Athletics	Women's 800 metres T53	29 August
Bronze	Nora Meister	Swimming	Women's 400 metre freestyle S6	2 September
Bronze	Elena Kratter	Athletics	Women's long jump T63	2 September

== Athletics ==
Marcel Hug, Manuela Schär and Catherine Debrunner are expected to compete for Switzerland at the 2020 Summer Paralympics.

Men's track

Athlete	Event	Heats		Final	
Athlete	Event	Result	Rank	Result	Rank
Beat Bösch	100m T52	—N/a		18.08	5
Beat Bösch	400m T52	1:05.10	4	Did not advance	
Philipp Handler	100m T13	10.97	3 q	11.02	7
Marcel Hug	800m T54	1:34.88	1 Q	1:33.68	1st place, gold medalist(s)
Marcel Hug	1500m T54	2:54.63 PR	1 Q	2:49.55 WR	1st place, gold medalist(s)
Marcel Hug	5000m T54	9:53.26 PR	1 Q	10:29.90	1st place, gold medalist(s)
Marcel Hug	Marathon T54	—N/a		1:24:02	1st place, gold medalist(s)

Women's track

Athlete	Event	Heats		Final	
Athlete	Event	Result	Rank	Result	Rank
Catherine Debrunner	400m T53	55.21	1 Q	56.18	1st place, gold medalist(s)
Catherine Debrunner	800m T53	1:51.47	3 Q	1:47.90	3rd place, bronze medalist(s)
Patricia Eachus	800m T54	1:58.64	5	Did not advance	
Patricia Eachus	1500m T54	3:37.43	5	Did not advance	
Sofia Gonzalez	100m T63	16.17	3 Q	16.38	7
Elena Kratter	100m T63	15.02	3 Q	15.07	5
Manuela Schär	400m T54	54.29	1 Q	53.59	1st place, gold medalist(s)
Manuela Schär	800m T54	1:51.09	1 Q	1:42.81 PR	1st place, gold medalist(s)
Manuela Schär	1500m T54	3:28.32	2 Q	3:28.01	2nd place, silver medalist(s)
Manuela Schär	Marathon T54	—N/a		1:38:12	2nd place, silver medalist(s)

Women's field

Athlete	Event	Final	
Athlete	Event	Result	Rank
Sofia Gonzalez	Long jump T63	3.96	8
Elena Kratter	Long jump T63	5.01	3rd place, bronze medalist(s)

== Badminton ==
Cynthia Mathez and Karin Suter-Erath have both qualified to compete.

Women

Athlete	Event	Group Stage				Quarterfinal	Semifinal	Final / BM	
Athlete	Event	Opposition Score	Opposition Score	Opposition Score	Rank	Opposition Score	Opposition Score	Opposition Score	Rank
Karin Suter-Erath	Singles WH1	Rongen (GER); W (21–6, 21–7)	Knoblauch (GER); W (21–18, 21–15)	—N/a	1 Q	Satomi (JPN); L (8–21, 9–21)	Did not advance		
Cynthia Mathez	Singles WH1	Pookkham (THA); L (12–21, 15–21)	Zhang (CHN); L (22–20, 23–25, 12–21)	Gorodetzky (ISR); W (21–15, 21–10)	3	Did not advance			
Cynthia Mathez; Karin Suter-Erath	Doubles WH1–WH2	Knoblauch / Rongen (GER); W (21–11, 21–11)	Yin / Liu (CHN); L (4–21, 9–21)	—N/a	2 Q	—N/a	Liu / Yin (CHN); L (10–21, 13–21)	Pookkham / Wetwithan (THA); L (17–21, 12–21)	4

== Cycling ==
Sandra Graf, Sandra Stöckl, Fabian Recher, Tobias Fankhauser and Heinz Frei have all qualified to compete.

== Equestrian ==
Nicole Geiger has qualified to compete.

== Shooting ==
Nicole Häusler qualified to represent Switzerland at the 2020 Summer Paralympics.

== Swimming ==
Two Swiss swimmers have successfully achieved Paralympic slots after breaking the MQS.

Men

Athlete	Event	Heats		Final	
Athlete	Event	Result	Rank	Result	Rank
Leo McCrea					
Nora Meister					

== Wheelchair tennis ==
Athlete	Event	Round of 64	Round of 32	Round of 16	Quarterfinals	Semifinals	Final / BM	
Athlete	Event	Opposition Result	Opposition Result	Opposition Result	Opposition Result	Opposition Result	Opposition Result	Rank
Nalani Buob	Women's singles	—N/a						

== See also ==
- Switzerland at the Paralympics
- Switzerland at the 2020 Summer Olympics
