= 2021 World Para Athletics European Championships – Women's 800 metres =

The women's 800 metres events were held at the 2021 World Para Athletics European Championships in Bydgoszcz, Poland.

The competition featured record breaking performances in both the T53 and T54 categories, breaking five year old marks originally set at the 2016 championships in Grosseto. In the T53 final, Switzerland's Catherine Debrunner clocked 1:56.14 to eclipse the previous championship record of 1:57.22 held by Turkey's Hamide Doğangün by 1.08 seconds. In the T54 classification final, her compatriot Patricia Eachus narrowly edged out Germany's Merle Menje by 0.02 seconds to secure the title in 1:52.02, lowering the 2016 championship record of 1:53.07 held by Russia's Natalia Kocherova by over a full second. Additionally, Great Britain's Fabienne André won the T34 event with a personal best time of 2:15.18.

== Medalists ==
Event	Gold		Silver		Bronze	
T34	Fabienne André (GBR)	2:15.18 PB	Veronika Doronina (RUS)	2:22.02	Cecile Goens (BEL)	3:02.65
T53	Catherine Debrunner (SUI)	1:56.14 CR	Hamide Doğangün (TUR)	1:57.57	Not awarded	
T54	Patricia Eachus (SUI)	1:52.02 CR	Merle Menje (GER)	1:52.04 PB	Nikita den Boer (NED)	1:52.65
WR world record | ER European record | CR championship record | NR national record | WL world leading | EL European leading | PB personal best | SB seasonal best

== See also ==
- List of IPC world records in athletics
