= Vanessa Cristina de Souza =

Brazilian wheelchair racer (born 1989)

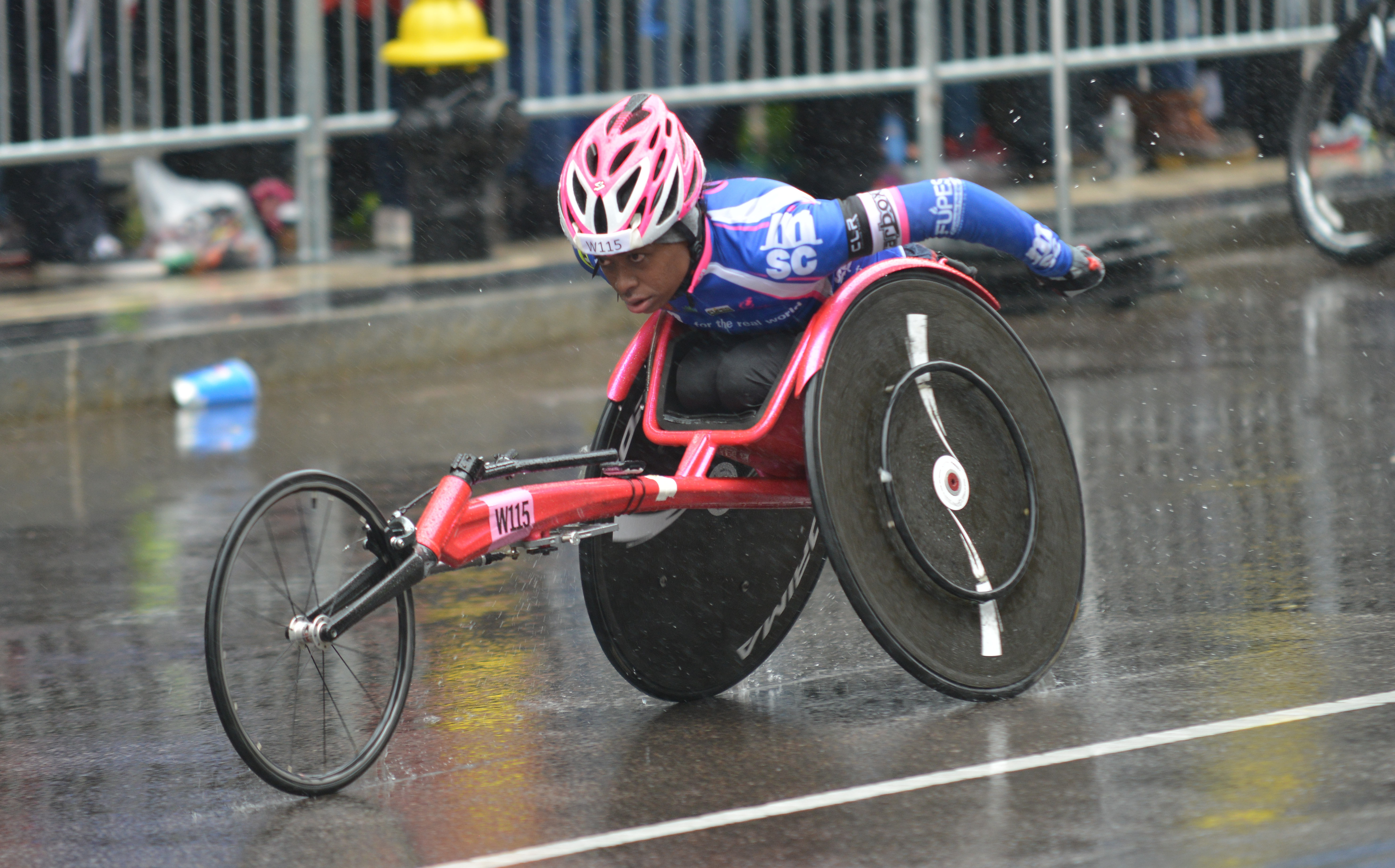
- de Souza racing in the 2018 Boston Marathon

Personal information
- Born: 20 November 1989 (age 36) São Paulo, São Paulo, Brazil
- Home town: Praia Grande, São Paulo, Brazil

Sport
- Sport: Wheelchair racing
- Disability class: T54
- Club: Time Naurú

Achievements and titles
- Paralympic finals: 2020
Medal record
Para athletics
Representing Brazil
Parapan American Games
Bronze medal – third place	2023 Santiago	400m T54

Vanessa Cristina de Souza (born 20 November 1989) is a Brazilian wheelchair racer, who came fourth at the 2021 Boston and Chicago Marathons. She competed in multiple events at the delayed 2020 Summer Paralympics.

== Personal life ==
De Souza is from Praia Grande, São Paulo, Brazil. At the age of 24, de Souza was involved in a motorcycle accident, and had her left leg amputated.

== Career ==
De Souza started competing in wheelchair racing eight months after her motorcycle accident. She trains at Time Naurú. In Brazil, de Souza has won the Saint Silvester Road Race on three occasions, most recently in 2019. She won the 2017 event despite completing the last 2 kilometres (1.2 mi) with a flat tyre. She has also won the São Paulo Half Marathon, and is the national record holder in the marathon, half marathon and 10 km events.

In 2018, she won the Lisbon Half Marathon in a photo finish with Margriet van den Broek; both racers were given the same time of 58:43. She finished sixth and last of the finishers at the 2018 Boston Marathon. In the same year, she finished fourth in the Oita International Wheelchair Marathon, in a personal best time of 1:45:19. She came fourth at the 2019 Singapore Marathon. De Souza won the 2020 Los Angeles Marathon in a time of 1:59:51. In the same year, she won the Seville Marathon, in a time of 1:40:27. Her time was a Brazilian national record, although she was 37 seconds outside the qualification time for the 2020 Summer Paralympics. She was named the Americas Paralympic Committee Athlete of the Month for February 2020. Due to the COVID-19 pandemic, she was unable to compete at the 2020 London Marathon or 2021 Grandma's Marathon.

De Souza competed in the 5,000 metres T54 at the delayed 2020 Summer Paralympics. She finished eighth in the final in a personal best time of 11:18:02. She also came eighth in the 1,500 metres T54, 12th in the marathon T54 event, racing with a back injury, and was part of the Brazilian team that came last in their heat of the mixed 4 × 100 metres relay. Later in the year, she came seventh at the 2021 London Marathon, fourth at the Boston and Chicago Marathons and fifth at the New York City Marathon.
