= Fabienne André =

British Paralympic athlete (born 1996)

Personal information
- Born: 20 September 1996 (age 29) England

Sport
- Sport: Wheelchair racing
- Disability class: T34
Medal record
Paralympic athletics
Representing Great Britain
World Championships
Bronze medal – third place	2025 New Delhi	400 m T34
European Championships
Gold medal – first place	2021 Bydgoszcz	Women's 100m T34
Gold medal – first place	2021 Bydgoszcz	Women's 800m T34
Representing England
Commonwealth Games
Bronze medal – third place	2022 Birmingham	100m – T34

Fabienne André (born 20 September 1996) is a British wheelchair racer. In 2021, she won gold in the 100 m and 800 m at the 2021 World Para Athletics European Championships.

== Life ==
She was born on 20 September 1996. She was first interested in swimming as a sport and she won three medals swimming at the Cerebral Palsy game in Barcelona in 2018. She later took an interest in athletics because she wanted to try a triathlon. She was training as a wheelchair racer in 2018. She has cerebral palsy and she competes in the T34 category. She works as a physiotherapist assistant.

== Career ==
André was chosen to compete at 100m and 800m (T34) as part of the Paralympics GB team at the postponed 2020 Summer Paralympics in Tokyo.

At the 2022 Commonwealth Games André won bronze in the T34 100m, being part of a Team England Podium Sweep in the event with teammates Hannah Cockroft and Kare Adenegan.

At the 2023 World Para Athletics Championships she won a bronze medal in the 100m and came 4th in the 800m.

At the 2024 World Para Athletics Championships she came 4th in both the 100m and 800m.

Fabienne was selected to compete at the 2024 Summer Paralympics, in the 100 and 800m. There she placed 4th and 5th in the events respectively.
