= Eden Rainbow-Cooper =

English wheelchair racer

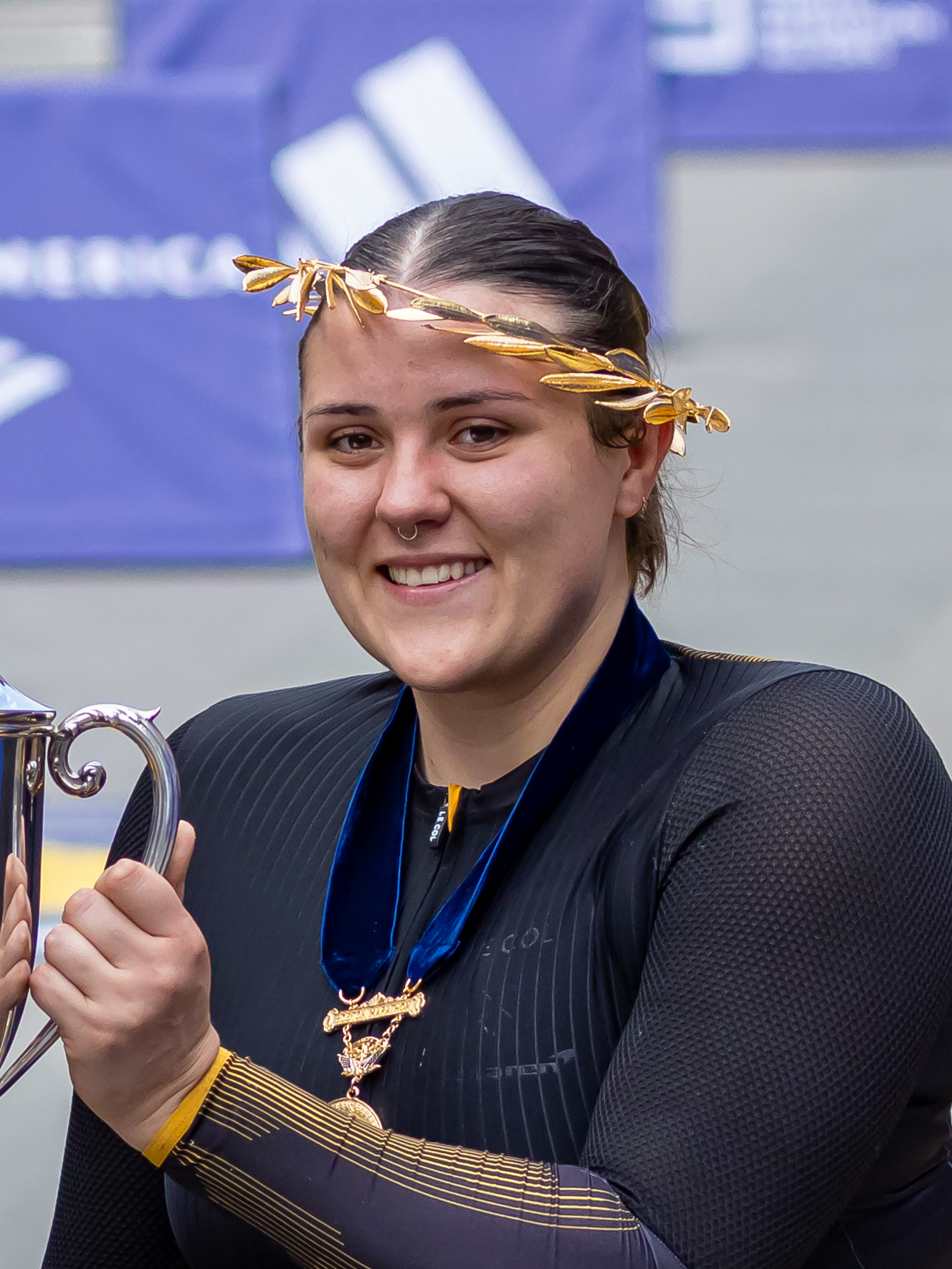
- Rainbow-Cooper after winning 2024 Boston Marathon

Personal information
- Born: 17 May 2001 (age 25) Portsmouth, England

Sport
- Country: England
- Sport: Wheelchair racing
- Disability: Sacral agenesis
- Disability class: T54
- Club: Red Velvet Racing Team
- Coached by: Arno Mul (2023 - present)
Medal record
Athletics
Representing England
Commonwealth Games
Silver medal – second place	2022 Birmingham	Marathon (T54)

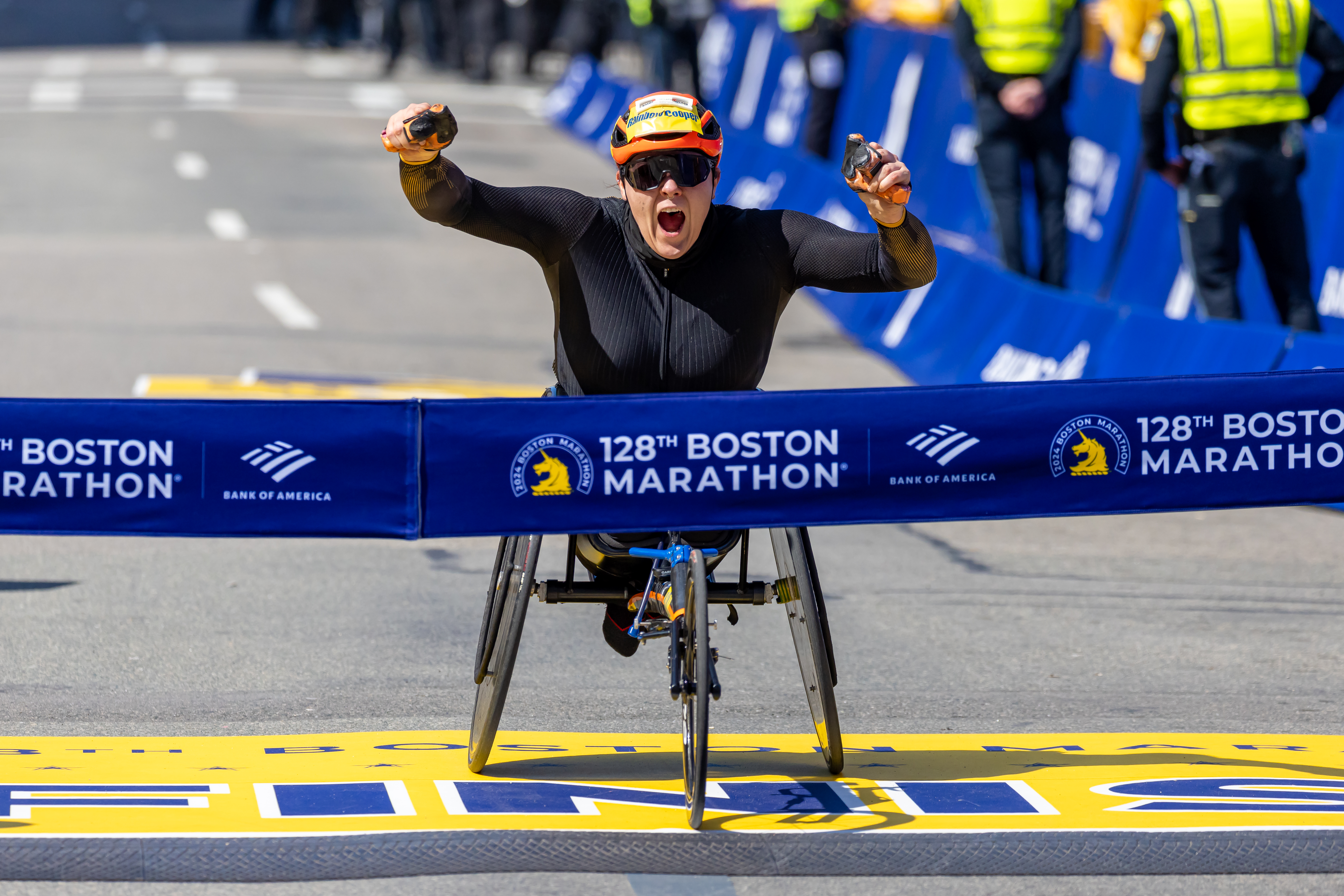
Rainbow-Cooper crossing the finishing line of the 2024 Boston Marathon

Eden Rainbow-Cooper (born 17 May 2001) is an elite English Paralympic athlete from Portsmouth. Rainbow-Cooper is a T54 athlete who competes as a wheelchair racer.

She was born with sacral agenesis. Rainbow-Cooper began wheelchair racing in 2013 and is since 2023 coached by the Dutch coach Arno Mul. From 2013 to 2023 she was a part of Weir Archer Academy. In the 2022 Commonwealth Games, she won a silver medal in the marathon (T54) event. She went on to come first in London's Big Half, equalling Manuela Schär’s course record for the women's wheelchair race. In September 2022, she won the women's wheelchair race in the Great North Run.

In April 2024, she won the women's wheelchair race in the Boston Marathon, becoming the first woman from Great Britain to do so. She won again in 2026, with a finishing time of 1:30:51.

Eden made her Paralympic debut at the 2024 Summer Paralympics held in Paris, France. There she competed in the 1500m, 5000m and marathon in the T54 classification. She came 7th in 1500m but failed to finish the 5000m or marathon.
