= Sofia Gonzalez (athlete) =

Swiss Paralympic athlete

Personal information
- Born: 27 March 2001 (age 25) London, England
- Home town: Jongny, Switzerland
- Education: City University of London

Sport
- Country: Switzerland
- Sport: Paralympic athletics
- Disability class: T63
- Events: 100 metres Long jump
Medal record
Paralympic athletics
Representing Switzerland
European Championships
Bronze medal – third place	2021 Bydgoszcz	100m T63

Sofia Gonzalez (born 27 March 2001) is a Swiss Paralympic athlete of Spanish and Mexican descent who competes in sprinting and long jump in international track and field competitions. She is a European bronze medalist in 100m. She competed at the 2020 Summer Paralympics but did not medal.

Gonzalez was born with a congenital deformity in her right leg and had her leg amputated below the knee when she was three years old. While growing up in Zürich, she was a very active person and did horse riding, tennis and skiing and then became a professional athlete in 2016 when she took part in a sporting event for people with prosthetics and trained with Heinrich Popow whom she admired as an influential person.

Gonzalez is studying for a bachelor's degree in sociology at City, University of London, she is also a motivational speaker in Switzerland and can fluently speak four languages.
