= 2021 World Para Athletics European Championships – Women's 1500 metres =

Four women's 1500 metres events were held at the 2021 World Para Athletics European Championships in Bydgoszcz, Poland.

== Medalists ==
Event	Gold		Silver		Bronze	
T11	Joanna Mazur (POL); Guide: Michal Stawicki	5:03.24	Susana Rodriguez Gacio (ESP); Guide: Celso Comesana Pereira	5:03.60	Havva Elmalı (TUR); Guide: Hasan Deniz Kalayci	5:15.58
T13	Greta Streimikyte (IRL)	4:39.27 ER	Izaskun Oses Ayukar (ESP)	4:40.49 SB	Veronika Zotova (RUS)	4:41.17 PB
T20	Liudmyla Danylina (UKR)	4:43.63	Barbara Bieganowska-Zając (POL)	4:43.78	Ilona Biacsi (HUN)	4:45.71 SB
T54	Patricia Eachus (SUI)	3:38.53	Nikita den Boer (NED)	3:38.99	Catherine Debrunner (SUI)	3:39.08
WR world record | ER European record | CR championship record | NR national record | WL world leading | EL European leading | PB personal best | SB seasonal best

== See also ==
- List of IPC world records in athletics
