= 2021 World Para Athletics European Championships – Women's 5000 metres =

One women's 5000 metres event was held at the 2021 World Para Athletics European Championships in Bydgoszcz, Poland.

== Medalists ==
Event	Gold		Silver		Bronze	
T54	Merle Menje (GER)	11:52.30 CR	Nikita den Boer (NED)	11:54.17	Patricia Eachus (SUI)	11:54.36
WR world record | ER European record | CR championship record | NR national record | WL world leading | EL European leading | PB personal best | SB seasonal best

== See also ==
- List of IPC world records in athletics
