= Athletics at the 2020 Summer Paralympics – Women's 5000 metres T54 =

Women's 5000 metres T54 at the XVI Paralympic Games
- Venue: Tokyo National Stadium
- Dates: 28 August 2021 (final)
- Competitors: 10 from 7 nations
- Winning time: 10:52.57

Medalists
1st place, gold medalist(s)		Susannah Scaroni	United States
2nd place, silver medalist(s)		Manuela Schär	Switzerland
3rd place, bronze medalist(s)		Tatyana McFadden	United States

The women's 5000 metres T54 event at the 2020 Summer Paralympics in Tokyo took place on 28 August 2021.

The T54 category is for wheelchair athletes with no leg function, but near full arm function and reasonable to normal trunk function. Typically this may be caused by a lower spinal cord injury or spinal cord birth defect.

== Records ==
Prior to the competition, the existing records were as follows:

World Record	Manuela Schär (SUI)	10:51.17	Arbon, Switzerland	5 August 2018
Paralympic Record	Tatyana McFadden (USA)	11:47.37	Rio de Janeiro, Brazil	14 September 2016

Area	Time	Athlete	Nation
Africa	11:56.13	Hannah Babalola	Nigeria
America	10:57.80	Tatyana McFadden	United States
Asia	11:19.78	Kazumi Nakayama	Japan
Europe	10:51.17 WR	Manuela Schär	Switzerland
Oceania	10:59.05	Madison de Rozario	Australia

== Results ==
=== Final ===
The final took place on 28 August 2021, at 10:06:

Rank	Name	Nationality	Class	Time	Notes
1st place, gold medalist(s)	Susannah Scaroni	United States	T54	10:52.57	PR
2nd place, silver medalist(s)	Manuela Schär	Switzerland	T54	11:00.50	SB
3rd place, bronze medalist(s)	Tatyana McFadden	United States	T54	11:15.13	SB
4	Nikita den Boer	Netherlands	T54	11:15.37	PB
5	Madison de Rozario	Australia	T53	11:15.86	
6	Merle Menje	Germany	T54	11:16.38	PB
7	Jenna Fesemyer	United States	T54	11:17.24	PB
8	Vanessa Cristina de Souza	Brazil	T54	11:18.02	PB
9	Zou Lihong	China	T54	11:18.06	AR
10	Patricia Eachus	Switzerland	T54	11:42.76	SB
