= Athletics at the 2022 Commonwealth Games – Women's marathon (T54) =

Women's marathon (T54) at the 2022 Commonwealth Games
- Dates: 30 July
- Competitors: 4 from 2 nations
- Winning time: 1:56:00

Medalists
gold medal	Madison de Rozario	Australia
silver medal	Eden Rainbow-Cooper	England

The women's marathon (T54) at the 2022 Commonwealth Games, as part of the athletics programme, was held in Birmingham on 30 July 2022.

== Records ==
Prior to this competition, the existing world and Games records were as follows:

Records T54
World record	Manuela Schär (SUI)	1:35:42	Ōita, Japan	17 November 2019

== Schedule ==
The schedule was as follows:

Date	Time	Round
Saturday 30 July 2022	07:03	Final

== Results ==
The results of the Women's T54 marathon were as follows:

Rank	Name	Sport class	Result	Notes
1st place, gold medalist(s)	Madison de Rozario (AUS)	T53	1:56:00	GR
2nd place, silver medalist(s)	Eden Rainbow-Cooper (ENG)	T54	1:59:45	PB
3	Shelly Oxley-Woods (ENG)	T54	2:03:39	
4	Christie Dawes (AUS)	T54	2:07:02	SB
