= Havva Elmalı =

Turkish Paralympic athlete

Personal information
- Born: 12 August 2003 (age 22) Ankara, Turkey

Sport
- Country: Turkey
- Sport: Paralympic athletics
- Disability: Visual impairment
- Disability class: T11
- Event(s): 400m, 1500m
Medal record
Track and field
Representing Turkey
World Para Athletics European Championships
Bronze medal – third place	2021 Bydgoszcz	400m T11
Bronze medal – third place	2021 Bydgoszcz	1500m T11

Havva Elmalı (born 12 August 2003) is a Turkish female para athlete competing in the T11 disability class middle-distance events of 400m and 1500m.

== Early life ==
Havva Elmalı was born in Ankara, Turkey on 12 August 2003. She grew up in foster care after she was taken out at her age of four from a nursery by Selma Engin, who worked volunteerly in the nursery. The foster family became impressed when they watched a visually impaired athlete became a world champion. They decided to engage her with sports.

== Sport career ==
Three months after she started wit athletics, Elmalı participated in a competition, and finished first, which motivated her for further training.

She started performing running in 2016. She is trained by Turkey national team coach Hasan Deniz Kalaycı.

Elmalı became champion in the 1500m T11 event at the 2019 IPC World Junior APara Athletics Championships held in Notvil, Switzerland. She won the bronze medal in the 400m T11 event of the 2021 World Para Athletics European Championships in Bydgoszcz, Poland. She won another bronze medal in the 1500m T11 event.

She was named as one of two flag bearers along with Mucahit Günaydın by the Turkish National Paralympic Committee to lead the Turkish contingent for the opening ceremony of the delayed 2020 Summer Paralympics.
