= 2017 World Para Athletics Championships – Women's 5000 metres =

The women's 5000 metres at the 2017 World Para Athletics Championships was held at the Olympic Stadium in London from 14 to 23 July.

== Medalists ==
Event	Gold		Silver		Bronze	
T54	Madison de Rozario; Australia	12:33.48	Amanda McGrory; United States	12:33.64	Chelsea McClammer; United States	12:34.17
WR world record | AR area record | CR championship record | GR games record | NR national record | OR Olympic record | PB personal best | SB season best | WL world leading (in a given season)

Events listed in pink were contested but no medals were awarded.

== See also ==
- List of IPC world records in athletics
