= Madison de Rozario =

Australian Paralympic athlete (born 1993)

Madison de Rozario OAM
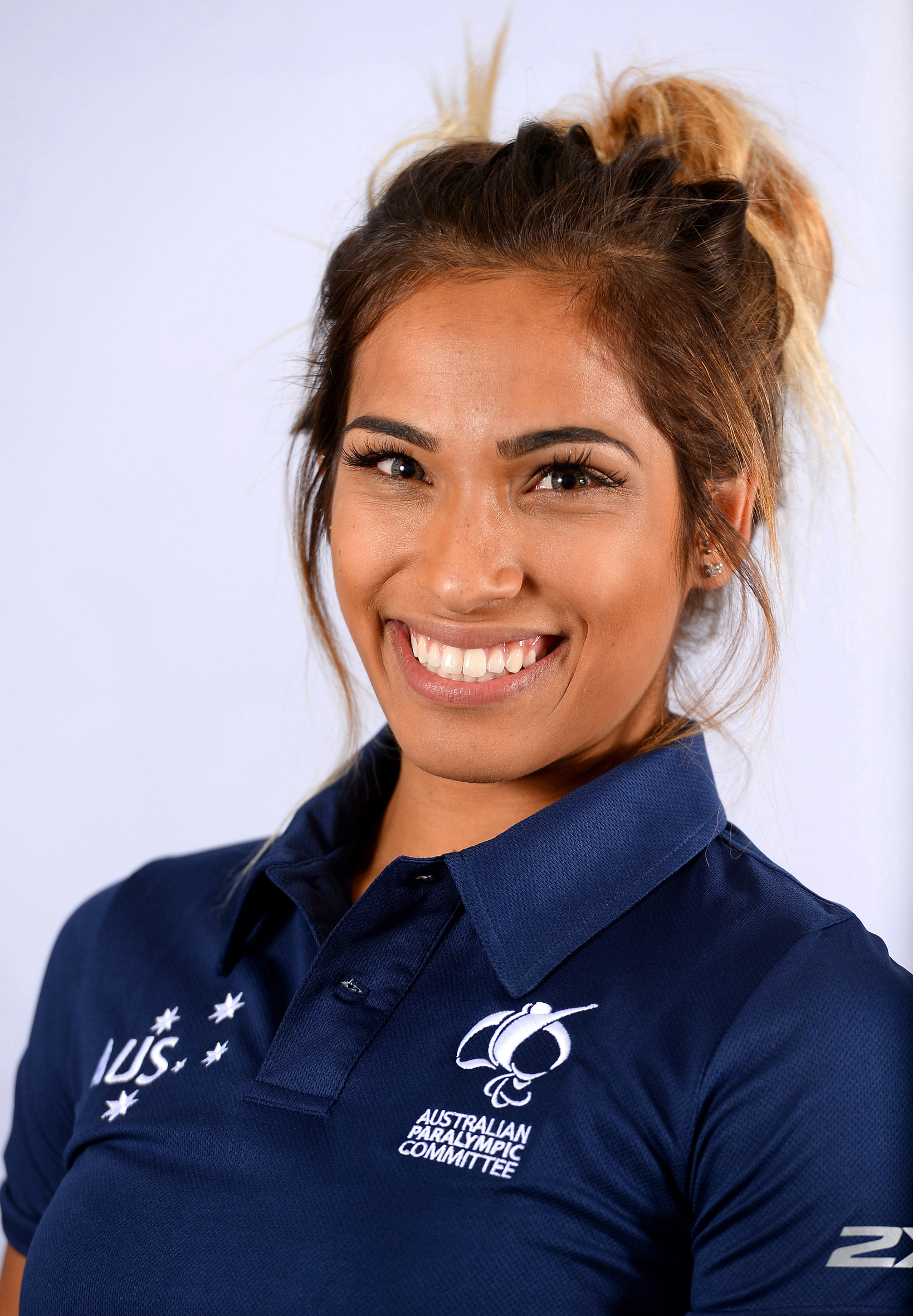
- 2016 Australian Paralympic team portrait of de Rozario

Personal information
- Nationality: Australian
- Born: 24 November 1993 (age 32) Perth, Western Australia, Australia

Sport
- Disability class: T53
- Coached by: Louise Sauvage

Achievements and titles
- Personal bests: 800 m T53: 1:45.53 (2019, WR); 1500 m T53/54: 3:13.27 (2018, OR); 5000 m T53/54: 10:59.05 (2019, OR)
Medal record
Event	1st	2nd	3rd
Paralympic Games	2	4	2
World Championships	3	3	4
Commonwealth Games	4	0	0
Total	9	6	6
Women's track and field
Paralympic Games
Gold medal – first place	2020 Tokyo	800m T53
Gold medal – first place	2020 Tokyo	Marathon T54
Silver medal – second place	2008 Beijing	4 × 100 m T53/54
Silver medal – second place	2016 Rio de Janeiro	800m T53
Silver medal – second place	2016 Rio de Janeiro	4 × 400 m T53/54
Silver medal – second place	2024 Paris	Marathon T54
Bronze medal – third place	2020 Tokyo	1500m T54
Bronze medal – third place	2024 Paris	5000m T54
World Para Athletics Championships
Gold medal – first place	2015 Doha	800m T53
Gold medal – first place	2017 London	5000m T54
Gold medal – first place	2019 Dubai	800m T54
Silver medal – second place	2017 London	800m T54
Silver medal – second place	2019 Dubai	1500m T54
Silver medal – second place	2019 Dubai	5000m T54
Bronze medal – third place	2013 Lyon	800m T53
Bronze medal – third place	2015 Doha	1500m T53
Bronze medal – third place	2017 London	1500m T54
Bronze medal – third place	2019 London	Marathon T54
Commonwealth Games
Gold medal – first place	2018 Gold Coast	1500m T54
Gold medal – first place	2018 Gold Coast	Marathon T54
Gold medal – first place	2022 Birmingham	1500m T53/54
Gold medal – first place	2022 Birmingham	Marathon T53/54

Madison de Rozario, OAM (born 24 November 1993) is an Australian Paralympic athlete and wheelchair racer who specialises in middle and long-distance events. She competed at the 2008 Beijing, 2012 London, 2016 Rio, 2020 Tokyo and 2024 Paris Paralympics, winning two gold, four silver and two bronze medals. She has also won ten medals (three gold, three silver and four bronze) at the World Para Athletics Championships and four gold at the Commonwealth Games. De Rozario holds the world record in the Women's 800m T53 and formerly in the Women's 1500m T53/54.

== Personal ==
De Rozario was born on 24 November 1993 and grew up in Perth, Western Australia. At the age of four, she developed transverse myelitis, a neurological disease which inflames the spinal cord and which resulted in her wheelchair use.

De Rozario's surname is of Portuguese origin. Her Singaporean-born father is of Eurasian descent and her mother is Australian. She studied Sports Science at Murdoch University in Perth, Western Australia, from 2011 to 2014.

== Athletics ==
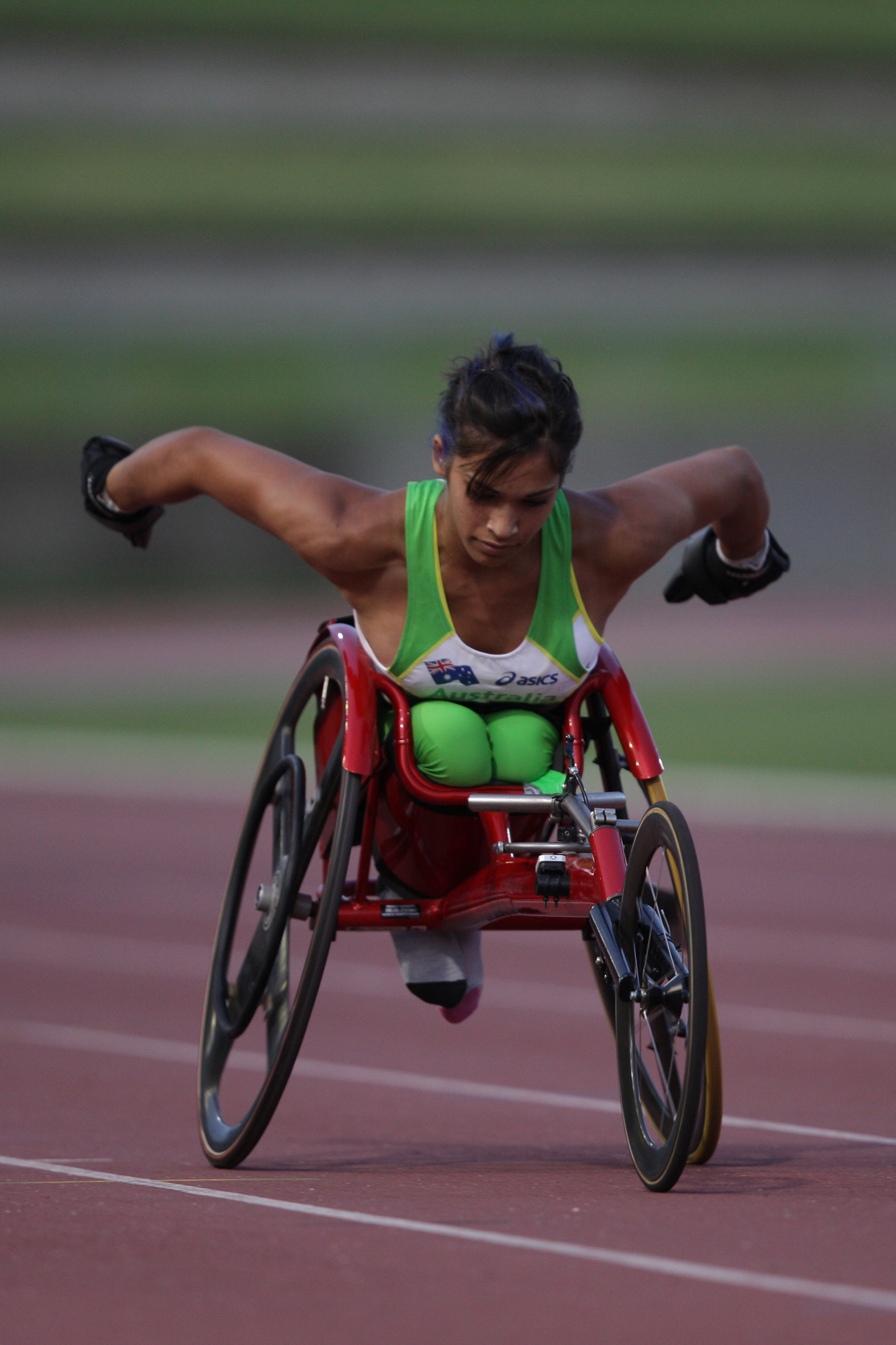
Madison de Rozario competing at the 2011 World Championships warm-up meet in Sydney in January 2011

At the age of 14, de Rozario competed at the 2008 Beijing Paralympics and won a silver medal in the Women's 4x100 m T53/54 event as part of the Australian team. She also competed in the individual women's T54 100 m and 400 m events. She was coached by former Paralympic athlete Frank Ponta and is currently coached by Louise Sauvage. She did not win a medal at the 2012 London Paralympics. In 2012 and 2013, she won the Oz Day 10K Wheelchair Road Race.

At the 2013 IPC Athletics World Championships, in Lyon, France, de Rozario won a bronze medal in the Women's 800 m T53.

At the 2015 IPC Athletics World Championships in Doha, de Rozario won the gold medal in the Women's 800m T54 in 1:53.86. It was her first gold medal at a major international competition. She also won a bronze medal in the Women's 1500m T54 in a time of 3:42.03.

At the 2016 Rio Paralympics, de Rozario won two silver medals. She won her first individual medal at the Paralympics with a silver in the Women's 800m T53. In addition, she was a member of the team that won the silver medal in the Women's 4 × 400 m Relay T53/54.

In November 2016, de Rozario was awarded the Wheelchair Sports WA Sport Star of the Year.

At the 2017 World Para Athletics Championships in London, de Rozario won the gold medal in the Women's 5000m T54, silver medal in the Women's 800m T54 and bronze medal in the Women's 1500m T54.

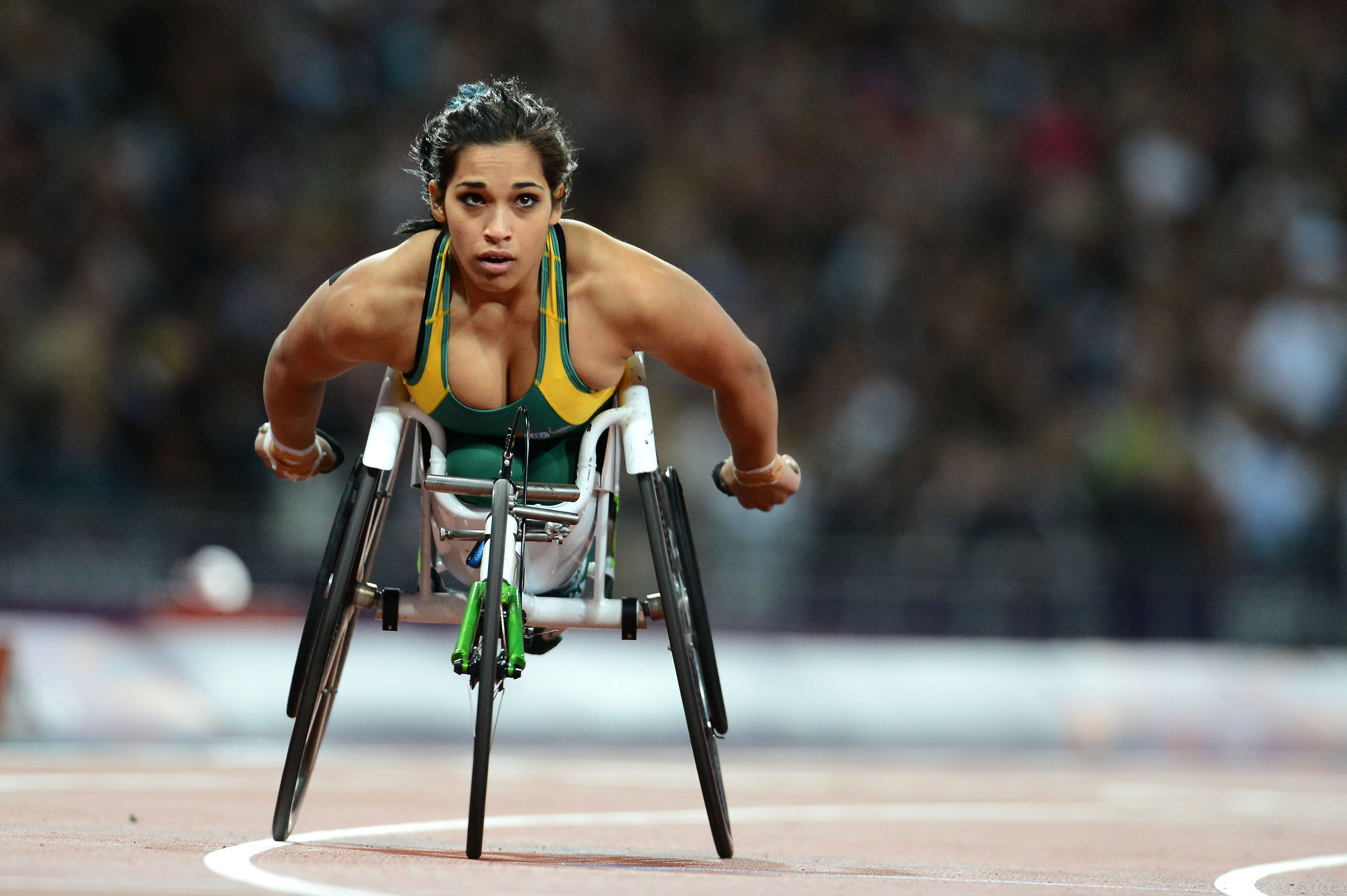
De Rozario at the 2012 London Paralympics

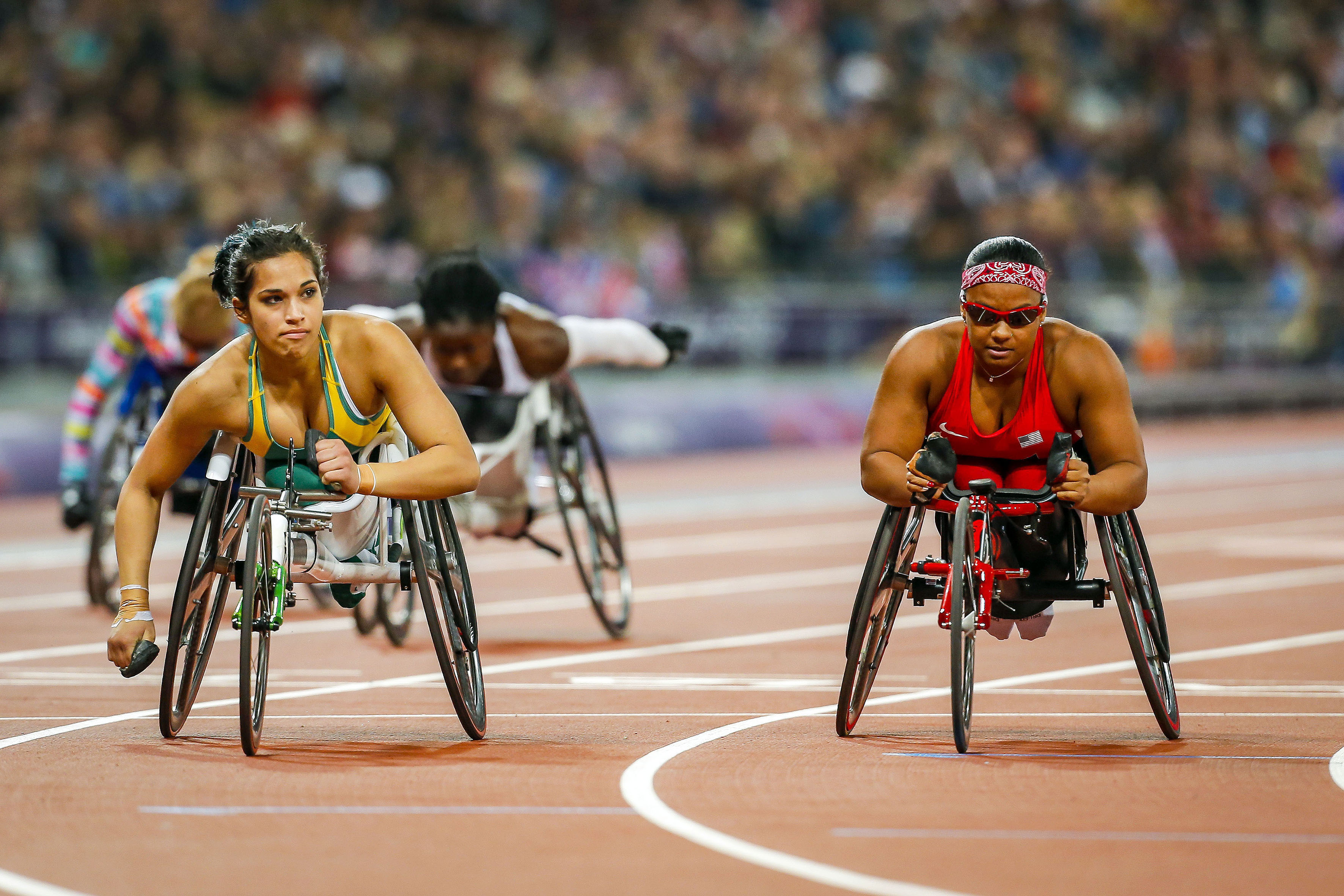
De Rozario at the 2012 London Paralympics

At the 2018 Commonwealth Games on the Gold Coast, Queensland, de Rozario won gold medals in the Women's 1500m T54 and Women's Marathon T54.

On 22 April 2018, de Rozario made a dramatic last dash sprint and won the 2018 London Marathon women's wheelchair title in a time of 1:42.58. She became the first Australian to win the women's wheelchair title.

At the 2019 London Marathon, which was also the 2019 World Para Athletics Championships marathon event, de Rozario won the bronze medal in the Women's T46. At the 2019 Championships track events held in Dubai, she won the gold medal in the Women's 800m T54 and two silver medals – Women's 1500m and 5000m T54.

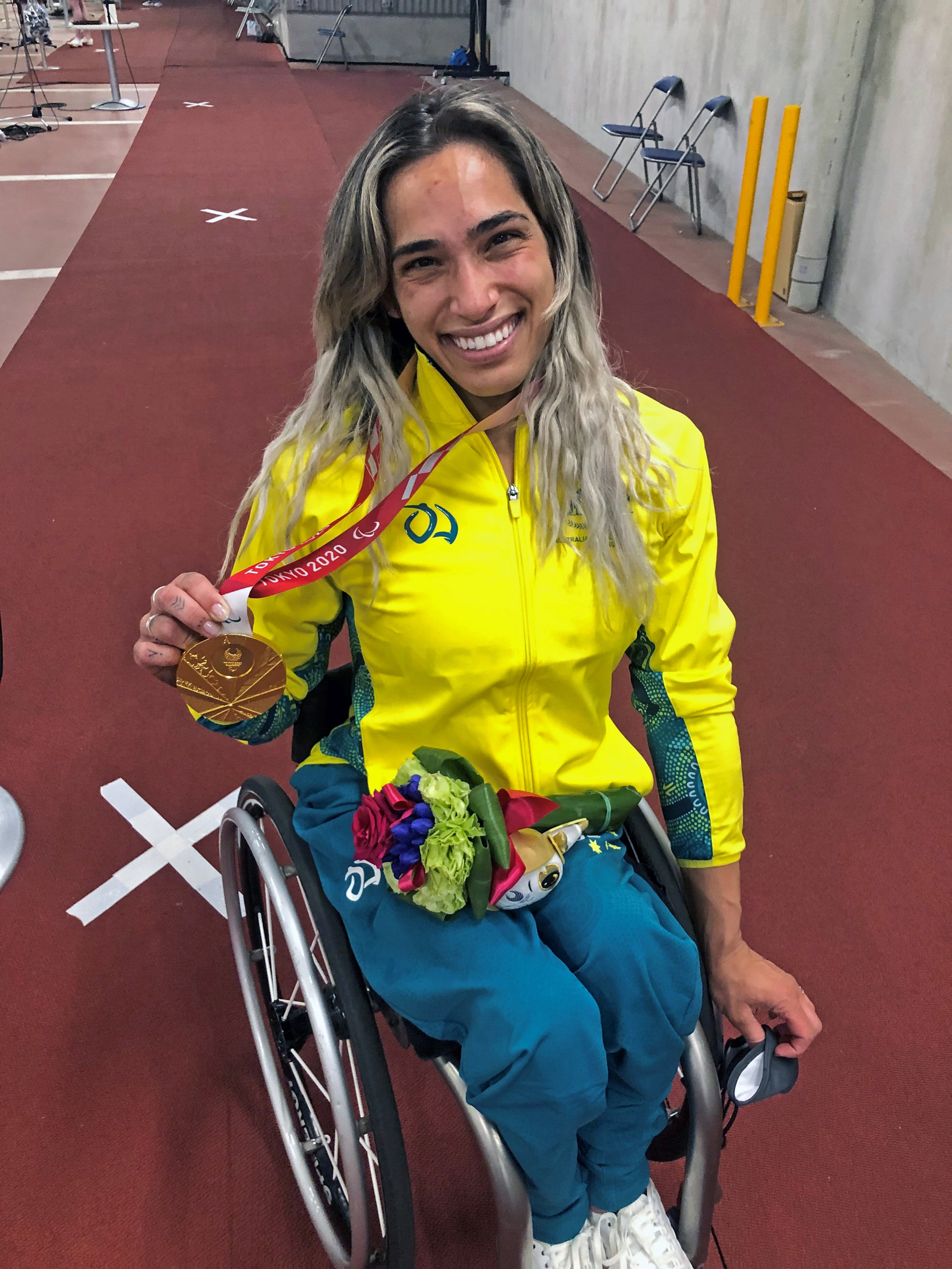
De Rozario with the gold medal she won in the women's T53 800m at the Tokyo 2020 Paralympics

At the 2020 Summer Paralympics in Tokyo, de Rozario won gold medals in the Women's 800m T53 and the Women's marathon T54, bronze in the Women's 1500m T54 and came fifth in the Women's 5000m T54. She is the second female Australian Paralympian after Jan Randles to win gold in the marathon at the Paralympic Games.

De Rozario won the 2021 New York City Marathon women's wheelchair race, defeating past champions Tatyana McFadden and Manuela Schär. She is the first Australian woman, either in wheelchair or open events, to claim victory on the 42 km course.

At the 2022 Commonwealth Games in Birmingham, de Rozario won the Women's T53/54 marathon as well as the Women's T53/54 1500m. In doing so, she was the first Australian para-athlete to win four gold medals at the Commonwealth Games.

She won the silver medal at the 2024 Paralympics in Paris for the Women's Marathon T54 where Catherine Sebrunner led from the start. She also won the bronze medal in the Women's 5000 m T54.

De Rozario has won the Oz Day 10K Wheelchair Road Race twelve times – 2012-2013, 2017-2026.

=== World records ===
Distance	Time	Location	Date
Women's 800m T53	1:45.53	Canberra, Australian Capital Territory	21 January 2019
Women's 1500m T53/54	3:13.27	Nottwil, Switzerland	26 May 2018

== Recognition ==
- 2018 – Cosmopolitan Women of the Year Awards – Sportswoman of the Year Award
- 2018 – UnioSport Australia – Outstanding Sporting Achievement
- 2018 – Athletics Australia Female Para-Athlete of the Year
- 2020 – Barbie's "Shero doll"
- 2020 – Paralympics Australia Female Athlete of the Year
- 2020 – Paralympics Australia Athlete of the Year
- 2021 – NSW Institute of Sport Female Athlete of the Year with Jessica Fox.
- 2021 – Western Australia Sports Star of the Year
- 2022 – Medal of the Order of Australia for service to sport as a gold medallist at the 2020 Tokyo Paralympic Games
- 2022 – Athletics Australia Bruce McAvaney Award for Performance of the Year
- 2022 – Women's Health Australian Women in Sport Awards – Athlete of the Year
- 2024 - 2024 Paris Paralympics Opening Ceremony Flag Bearer with Brenden Hall.
