= 2020 London Marathon =

40th annual marathon race in London

40th London Marathon
- Venue: London, England
- Date: 4 October 2020

Champions
- Men: Shura Kitata (02:05:41)
- Women: Brigid Kosgei (02:18:58)
- Wheelchair men: Brent Lakatos (01:36:04)
- Wheelchair women: Nikita den Boer (01:40:07)

The 2020 London Marathon was the 40th running of the annual marathon race in London, United Kingdom, which took place on 4 October 2020. Due to the COVID-19 pandemic, the race was postponed from 26 April and only allowed elite participants; the mass participation event was cancelled. The event used a different course from usual, consisting of multiple laps around St James's Park.

The men's elite race was won by Ethiopian Shura Kitata, and the women's event was won by Kenyan Brigid Kosgei. The men's wheelchair race was won by Canadian Brent Lakatos, and the women's event was won by Dutchwoman Nikita den Boer.

== Background ==
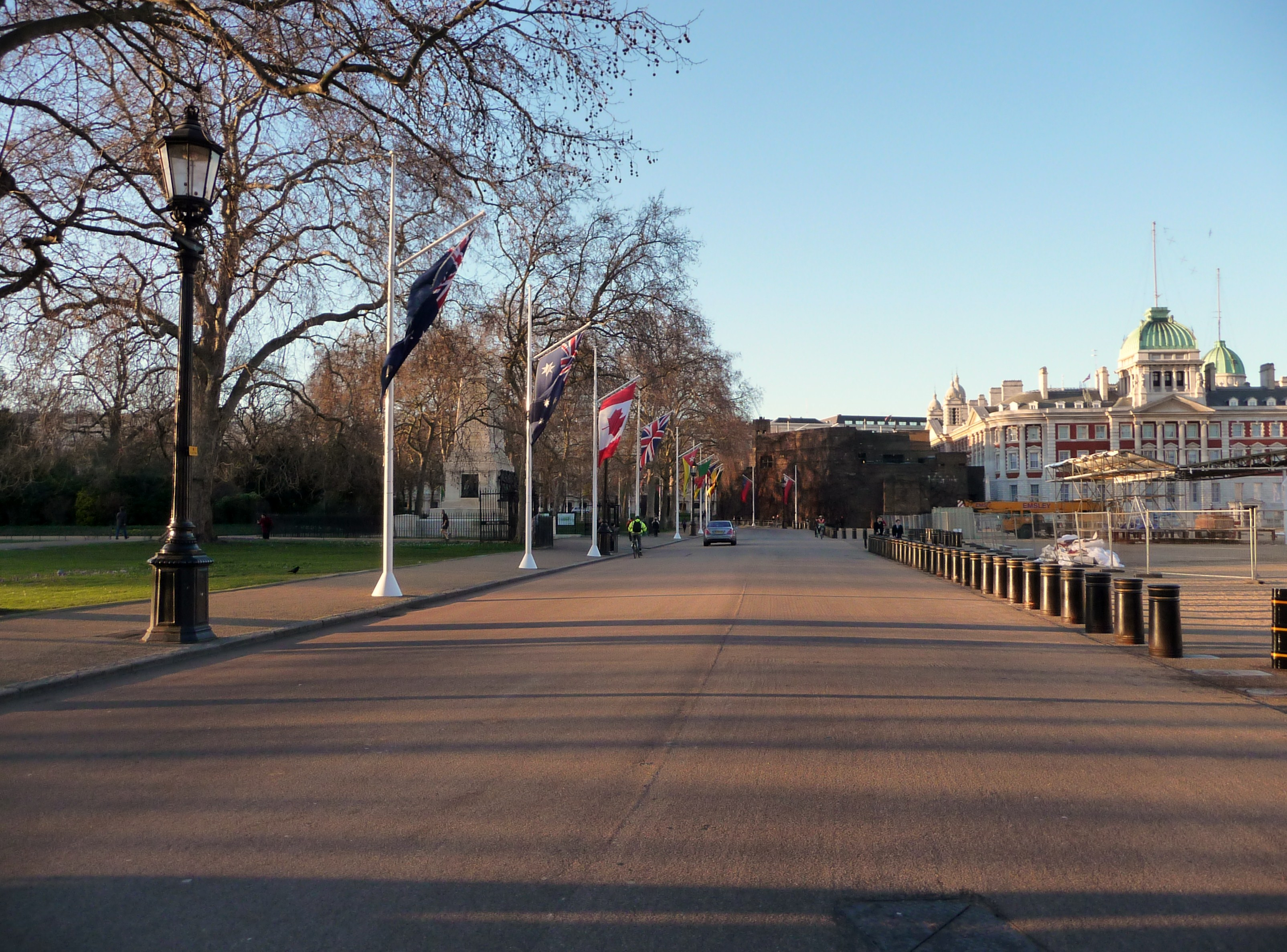
Horse Guards Parade was one of the roads used in the modified course.

The 2020 London Marathon was originally scheduled to be held on 26 April but was postponed until 4 October due to the COVID-19 pandemic. It was the first London Marathon to be run in the autumn. On 6 August, it was confirmed that the marathon would go ahead as an elite-only race, with the mass participation event cancelled. Fields of around 30–40 athletes competed for each title. It was the first time that the London Marathon was solely an elite-only event. Due to the COVID-19 pandemic, the race was run without spectators, in a biosecure environment. All athletes were tested for COVID-19 multiple times before the race, and wore face coverings and observed social distancing when not competing. All competitors and event co-ordinators wore a "bump" device which alerted them if they got too close to other people.

As a result of the need for a biosecure environment, the race did not follow its traditional route. Instead, the 2020 London Marathon consisted of 19 laps of length 2.15 kilometres (1.34 mi) around St James's Park, followed by 1,345 metres (0.84 mi) along The Mall, following the finish line of the traditional London Marathon course. The circuits took in The Mall, Horse Guards Parade, Birdcage Walk and Buckingham Palace. The area around St James's Park was closed to prohibit spectators from attending.

The prize money for winners of the 2020 London Marathon was 50 per cent lower than in 2019. For the first time, there was separate prize money awarded to the highest finishing British athletes in the race. The winner's prize money was US$30,000. British competitors who achieved the Olympic qualifying standard at the 2020 London Marathon would have their time count towards the qualification criteria at the delayed 2020 Summer Olympics in Tokyo in 2021. Before both events were postponed, the London Marathon had been scheduled to be used as the British trial event to determine qualification for the 2020 Olympics.

The 2021 London Marathon was postponed from April until October 2021, to maximise the chance of being able to hold a mass participation event.

== Competitors ==
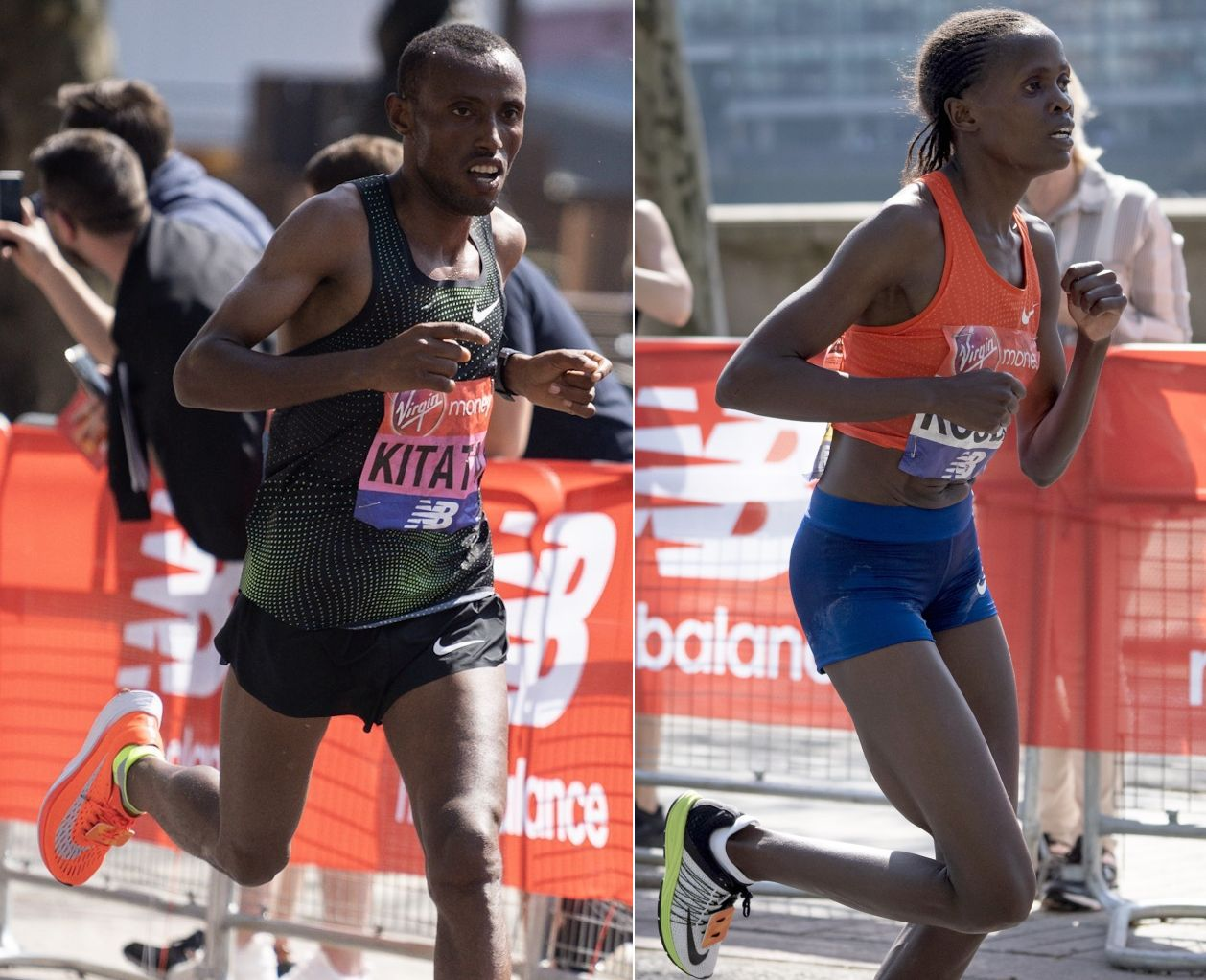
Shura Kitata won the men's race, and Brigid Kosgei won the women's race.

The women's race included 2019 winner and then marathon world record holder Brigid Kosgei, 2018 winner Vivian Cheruiyot, as well as Ruth Chepng'etich, Roza Dereje, and Valary Jemeli Aiyabei, all of whom had personal best times under 2:20. Ethiopian Degitu Azimeraw was scheduled to race, but withdrew after testing positive for COVID-19.

The favourites for the men's race were 2019 winner Eliud Kipchoge and Kenenisa Bekele, who won the 2019 Berlin Marathon in 2:01:41, two seconds away from Kipchoge's world record at the time. The men's race also featured Mosinet Geremew, Mule Wasihun, Sisay Lemma, and Tamirat Tola, all of whom had personal best times under 2:05. Sondre Nordstad Moen, who broke the European one hour run record earlier in 2020, (Note: On 4 September 2020, Farah set the men's all-time record for the one hour run at the 2020 Diamond League meeting in Brussels, Belgium, covering 21,330 metres (13.25 miles).) also competed. Briton Mo Farah, who in September 2020 set the men's world record for the one hour run, acted as a pacemaker for the men's race. Two days before the race, Kenenisa Bekele withdrew from the London Marathon with a calf injury. American Galen Rupp, who won his country's Olympic qualifying event in February 2020, did not compete, after undergoing surgery for an existing injury.

The men's wheelchair race featured 10 competitors. 2019 winner Daniel Romanchuk was scheduled to race, but later decided not to attend the event. The race featured Marcel Hug, who won the London Marathon in 2014 and 2016, and was the only man to have beaten Romanchuk in a marathon since March 2019. Other competitors included British eight-time winner David Weir, 2010 winner Josh Cassidy, and Sho Watanabe, who came second at the 2020 Tokyo Marathon.

The women's wheelchair race featured six competitors. 2019 winner Manuela Schär competed at the 2020 race, and former women's winner Shelly Woods raced in what was her first event for four years.

== Race summary ==
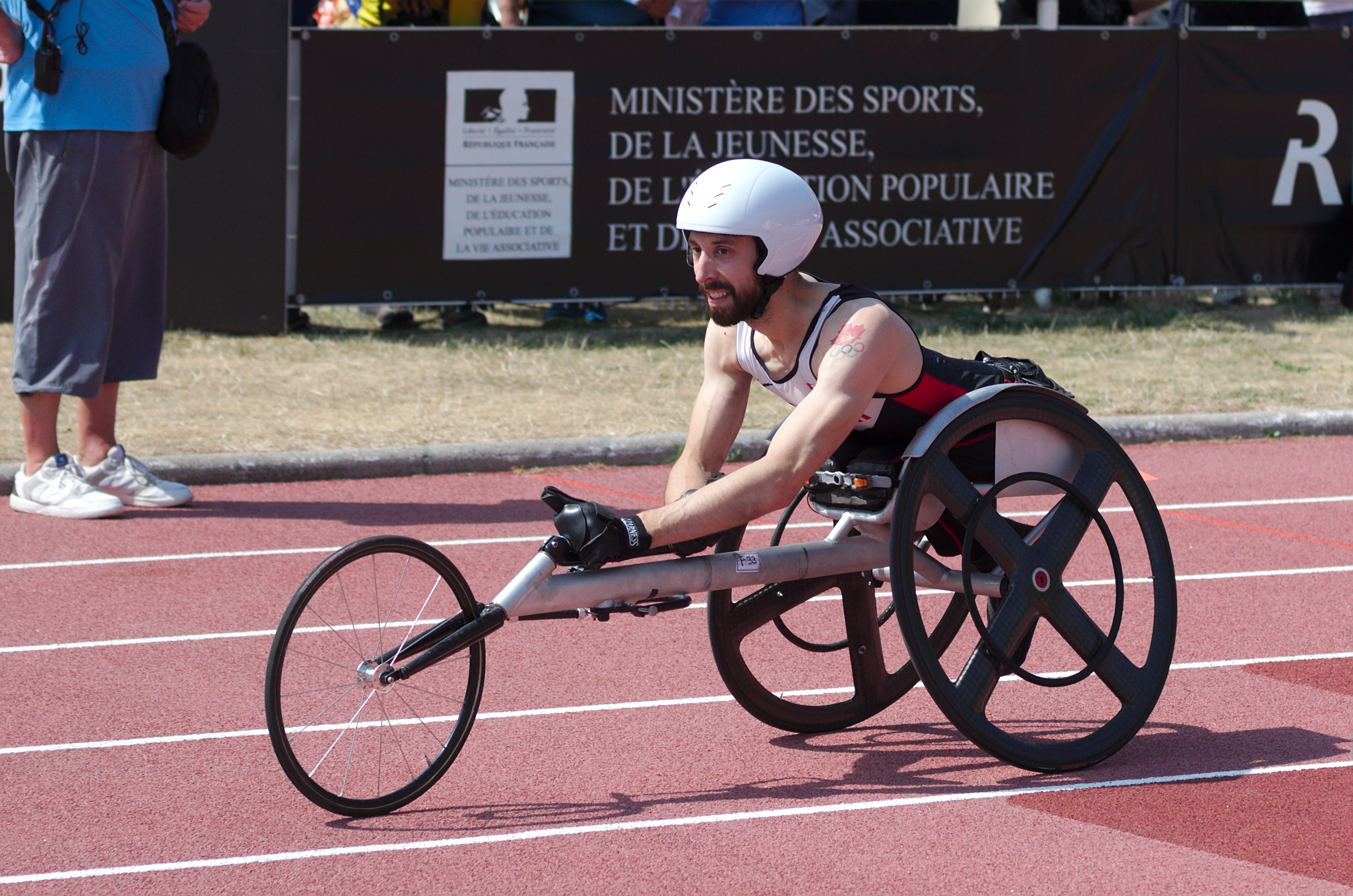
Brent Lakatos won the men's wheelchair race.

There were three separate races: the women's race started at 7:15 BST (UTC+1), the men's event started at 10:15 BST, and the wheelchair marathon started at 13:10 BST. All of the races were run in heavy rain due to Storm Alex, which made them the wettest London Marathon in history. The temperature was cold, though it was warmer than the 2004 race, where the temperature was 5.3 °C (41.5 °F) at the start. The conditions inhibited any chance of world records being broken at the event; world record attempts had been thought possible due to the flatness of the 2020 marathon course.

In the women's race, 2019 winner Brigid Kosgei retained her title, winning by over three minutes. Kosgei broke away from the pack 18 miles (29 km) into the race, and stayed ahead for the rest of the race. She finished in a time of 2:18.58. Ruth Chepng'etich was running second until she was overtaken by Sara Hall around 150 metres (490 ft) from the finish line. Hall finished second, in a personal best time, and Chepng'etich third. Hall's second place was the first time that an American had finished in the top three of the London Marathon since 2006, when Deena Kastor won the race. It was also the first time that a non-African had finished in the top three of the event since 2013, when Japan's Yukiko Akaba finished third. Natasha Cockram won the prize for best British finisher, although she was outside the Olympic qualifying time. After the race, Chepng'etich said that she had struggled with the cold, wet conditions.

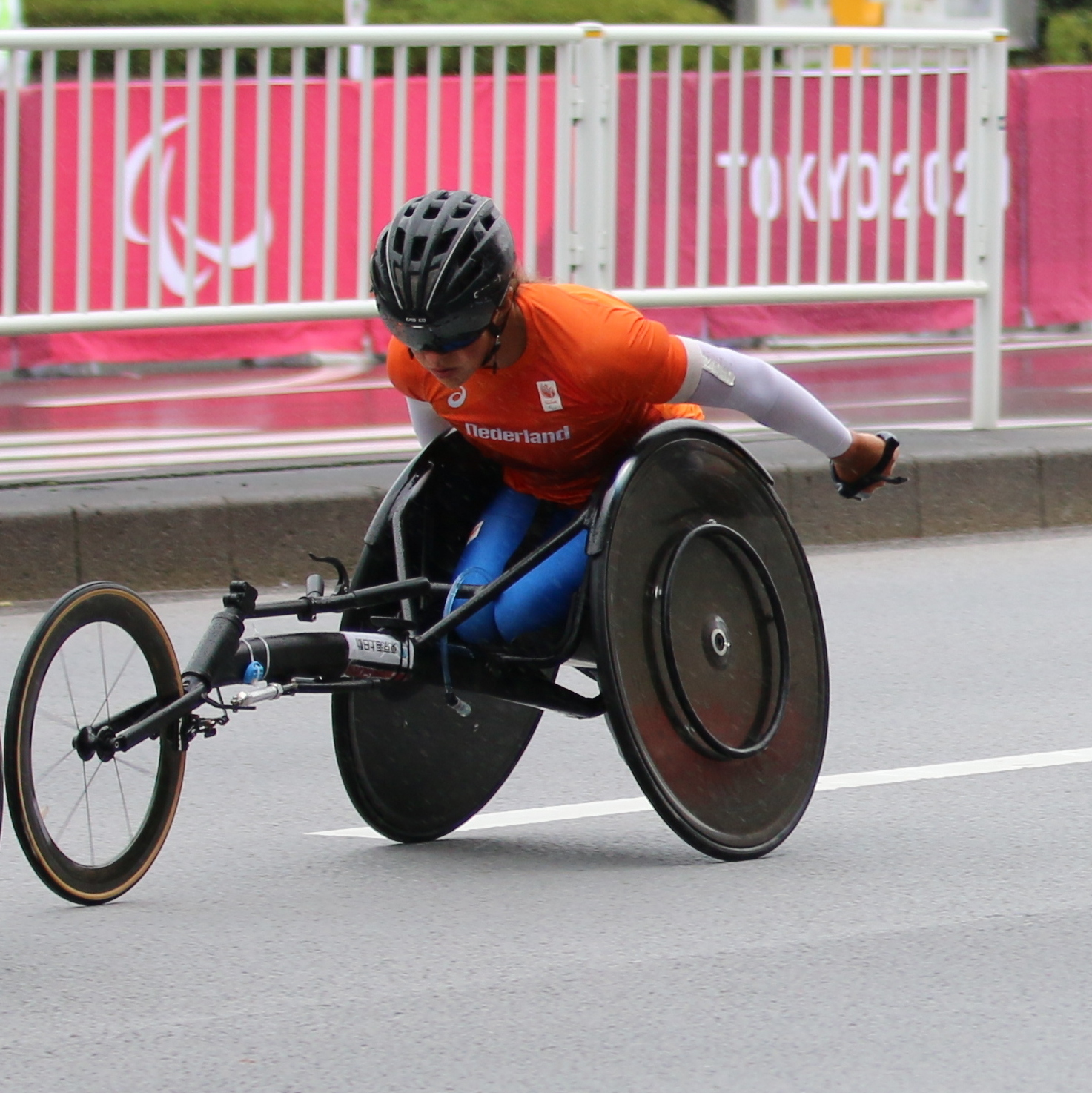
Nikita den Boer won the women's wheelchair race.

In the men's race, Shura Kitata won a sprint finish with Vincent Kipchumba and Sisay Lemma, who finished second and third respectively. Shura finished in a time of 2:05:41. The front group completed the first half of the marathon in 1:02:54, and with 4 miles (6.4 km) left in the race, there was a group of nine contenders for the victory. At that point, Shura moved to the front of the field and accelerated the pace. 2019 winner Eliud Kipchoge was dropped from the leading group, and eventually finished in eighth place. It was the first time since 2013 that Kipchoge had lost a marathon race, and after the race, Kipchoge said that he ran the last 15 kilometres (9.3 mi) with a blocked ear. It was Kipchoge's second slowest marathon time. Jonathan Mellor won the prize for best British finisher. He and Ben Connor finished within the Olympic qualifying time.

The men's wheelchair race was won by Canadian Brent Lakatos in a sprint finish involving six athletes. With two laps to go, Lakatos decided to move to the front of the group, and he remained there until the finish. David Weir and Marcel Hug finished second and third respectively, and Sho Watanabe, Jordi Madera, and Kota Hokinoue were also involved in the final sprint. Hug and Watanabe finished with exactly the same time. Lakatos was the first Canadian to finish on the podium in the London Marathon men's wheelchair event for 10 years.

The women's wheelchair was won by Nikita den Boer, who finished 82 seconds clear of pre-race favourite Manuela Schär. The pair had traded the lead throughout the race until around 5 kilometres (3.1 mi) from the finish, when den Boer took a lead that Schär could not pull back. American Jenna Fesemyer finished third, over 12 minutes behind den Boer. It was den Boer's first World Marathon Majors victory, and she was the first Dutch person to win a London Marathon wheelchair race. Den Boer beat her previous personal best by over 10 minutes, and due to her victory, she qualified for the delayed 2020 Summer Paralympics. (Note: The Dutch qualifying standard for the 2020 London Marathon was to finish in the top four.) Schär had won the previous nine World Marathon Majors races that she competed in. (Note: Schär did not compete at the 2020 Tokyo Marathon.)

== Results ==
=== Men ===
Elite men's top 10 finishers
Position	Athlete	Nationality	Time
1st place, gold medalist(s)	Shura Kitata	Ethiopia	02:05:41
2nd place, silver medalist(s)	Vincent Kipchumba	Kenya	02:05:42
3rd place, bronze medalist(s)	Sisay Lemma	Ethiopia	02:05:45
4	Mosinet Geremew	Ethiopia	02:06:04
5	Mule Wasihun	Ethiopia	02:06:08
6	Tamirat Tola	Ethiopia	02:06:41
7	Benson Kipruto	Kenya	02:06:42
8	Eliud Kipchoge	Kenya	02:06:49
9	Sondre Nordstad Moen	Norway	02:09:01
10	Marius Kipserem	Kenya	02:09:25

=== Women ===
Elite women's top 10 finishers
Position	Athlete	Nationality	Time
1st place, gold medalist(s)	Brigid Kosgei	Kenya	02:18:58
2nd place, silver medalist(s)	Sara Hall	United States	02:22:01
3rd place, bronze medalist(s)	Ruth Chepng'etich	Kenya	02:22:05
4	Ashete Bekere	Ethiopia	02:22:51
5	Alemu Megertu	Ethiopia	02:24:23
6	Molly Seidel	United States	02:25:13
7	Gerda Steyn	South Africa	02:26:51
8	Sinead Diver	Australia	02:27:07
9	Darya Mykhaylova	Ukraine	02:27:29
10	Valary Jemeli	Kenya	02:28:18

=== Wheelchair men ===
Wheelchair men's finishers
Position	Athlete	Nationality	Time
1st place, gold medalist(s)	Brent Lakatos	Canada	01:36:04
2nd place, silver medalist(s)	David Weir	United Kingdom	01:36:06
3rd place, bronze medalist(s)	Marcel Hug	Switzerland	01:36:08
4	Sho Watanabe	Japan	01:36:08
5	Jordi Madera	Spain	01:36:09
6	Kota Hokinoue	Japan	01:36:11
7	Rafael Botello	Spain	01:44:48
8	Heinz Frei	Switzerland	01:52:42
9	James Senbeta	United States	01:59:45

=== Wheelchair women ===
Wheelchair women's finishers
Position	Athlete	Nationality	Time
1st place, gold medalist(s)	Nikita den Boer	Netherlands	01:40:07
2nd place, silver medalist(s)	Manuela Schär	Switzerland	01:41:29
3rd place, bronze medalist(s)	Jenna Fesemyer	United States	01:52:16
4	Patricia Eachus	Switzerland	02:02:38
5	Margriet van den Broek	Netherlands	02:10:05

== Virtual marathon ==
A virtual marathon event was also held to allow people to run a marathon distance and record their own times. The virtual race had an entry fee, with all proceeds going to charity. Competitors who completed a virtual marathon on 4 October and recorded it on the official app received a medal, as they would do for finishing a traditional London Marathon. The times from the virtual race could be used for entry to the in-person 2021 mass participation event. Over 43,000 people ran a virtual London Marathon. In January 2021, the virtual event received a Guinness World Record for most users to run an organised remote marathon in 24 hours.

== See also ==
- Impact of the COVID-19 pandemic on sports
