= Jenna Fesemyer =

American wheelchair racer (1997)

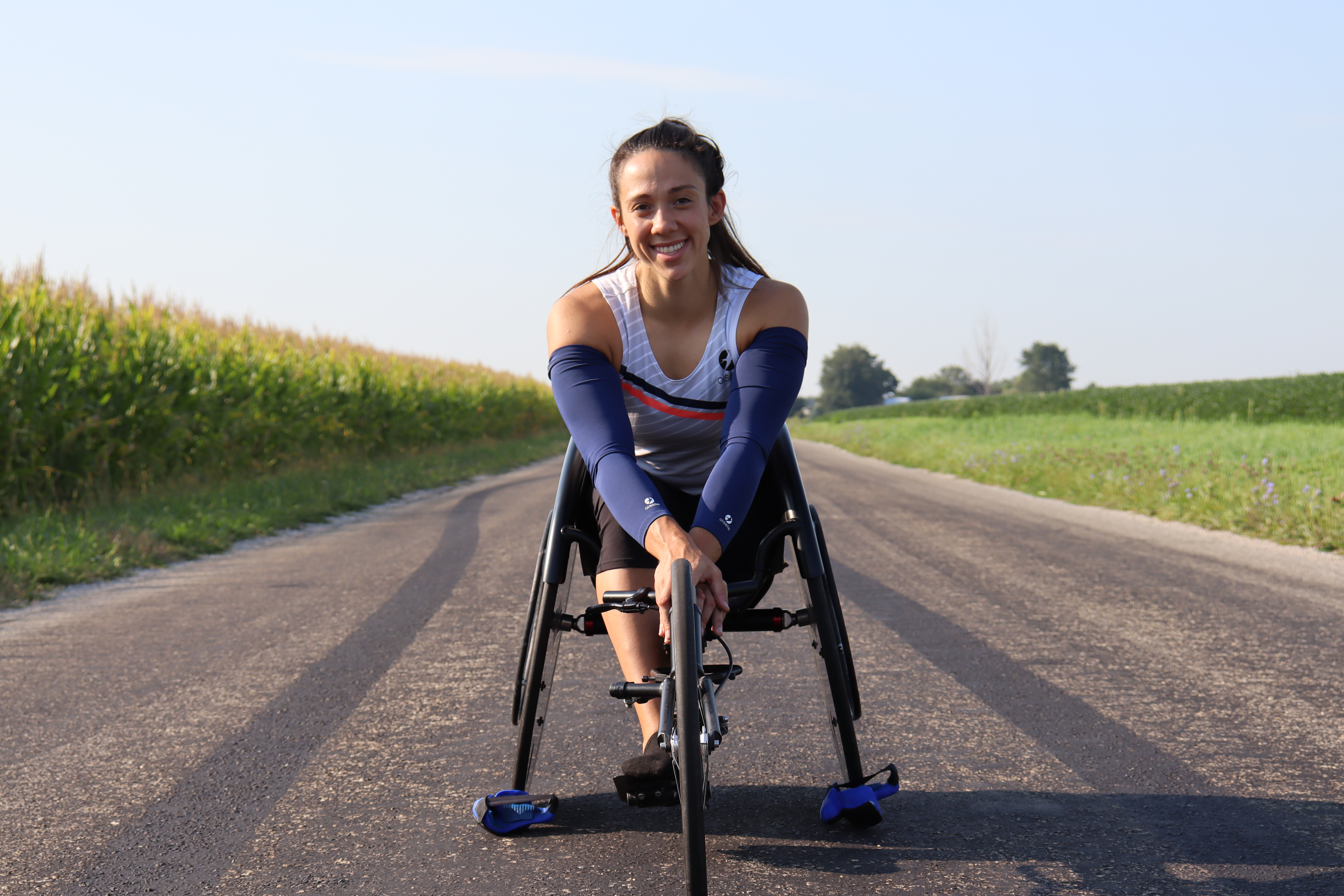
- Fesemyer in 2020

Personal information
- Born: January 31, 1997 (age 29) Akron, Ohio, U.S.
- Home town: Ravenna, Ohio
- Website: jennafesemyer.com

Sport
- Country: United States
- Sport: Wheelchair racing
- Disability class: T54
- Coached by: Adam Bleakney
Medal record
Women's wheelchair racing
Representing United States
Parapan American Games
Gold medal – first place	2019 Lima	800 m T54
Silver medal – second place	2019 Lima	400 m T54

Jenna Fesemyer (born January 31, 1997) is an American wheelchair racer. She won a gold and a silver medal at the 2019 Parapan American Games held in Lima, Peru. She also represented the United States at the 2020 Summer Paralympics in Tokyo, Japan.

In 2020, she won the bronze medal in the women's wheelchair race in the London Marathon held in London, United Kingdom.

== Early life and education ==
Fesemyer was born with proximal femoral focal deficiency and is one of triplets. She earned a bachelor's degree in kinesiology and communications from the University of Illinois Urbana-Champaign in 2019, followed by a master's degree in education policy, organization and leadership. As of 2024, she is pursuing a PhD in Recreation, Sport and Tourism at the same institution.

== Career ==
Fesemyer won the silver medal in the women's wheelchair race in the 2019 Los Angeles Marathon held in Los Angeles, United States. In the same year, she represented the United States at the 2019 Parapan American Games held in Lima, Peru and she won the gold medal in the women's 800 metres T54 event and the silver medal in the women's 400 metres T54 event. In November 2019, she finished in 7th place in the women's category of the New York City Marathon held in New York City, United States. Fesemyer came third at the delayed 2020 London Marathon.

At the 2020 Summer Paralympics in Tokyo, Japan, Fesemyer finished in 7th place in the women's 5000 metres T54 event with a new personal best of 11:17.24. She also competed in the women's 1500 metres T54 and women's marathon T54 events.

Two months after the Paralympics, Fesemyer competed in several wheelchair marathon races: she finished in third place in the women's wheelchair race at the 2021 Chicago Marathon and she also respectively finished in 9th and 6th place in this race at the 2021 London Marathon and 2021 Boston Marathon. She also finished in 4th place in the 2021 New York City Marathon.

In 2023, Fesemyer won the women's wheelchair division of Grandma's Marathon in Duluth, Minnesota, finishing in 1:47:20. She was also named to the U.S. Paralympic team for the 2024 Summer Paralympics in Paris, where she competed in the 800m, 1500m, and marathon T54 events.

== Achievements ==
Year	Competition	Venue	Position	Event	Notes
Representing United States
2019	Los Angeles Marathon	Los Angeles, United States	2nd	Marathon	2:04:14
2019	Parapan American Games	Lima, Peru	2nd	400 m	
2019	Parapan American Games	Lima, Peru	1st	800 m	
2020	London Marathon	London, United Kingdom	3rd	Marathon	1:52:16
2021	Summer Paralympics	Tokyo, Japan	7th	5000 m	11:17:24
2021	Summer Paralympics	Tokyo, Japan	6th (h)	1500 m	3:37:56
2021	Summer Paralympics	Tokyo, Japan	11th	Marathon	1:50:06
2021	London Marathon	London, United Kingdom	9th	Marathon	2:03:08
2021	Chicago Marathon	Chicago, United States	3rd	Marathon	1:50:23
2021	Boston Marathon	Boston, United States	6th	Marathon	1:59:51
2021	New York City Marathon	New York City, United States	4th	Marathon	1:59:45
2022	New York City Marathon	New York City, United States	5th	Marathon	1:51:38
2023	New York City Half Marathon	New York City, United States	4th	Half-Marathon	1:03:44
2023	New York Mini 10K	New York City, United States	2nd	10 km	25:16
2023	London Marathon	London, United Kingdom	8th	Marathon	1:47:43
2023	Peachtree Road Race	Atlanta, United States	4th	10 km	25:50
