= Nikita den Boer =

Dutch wheelchair racer

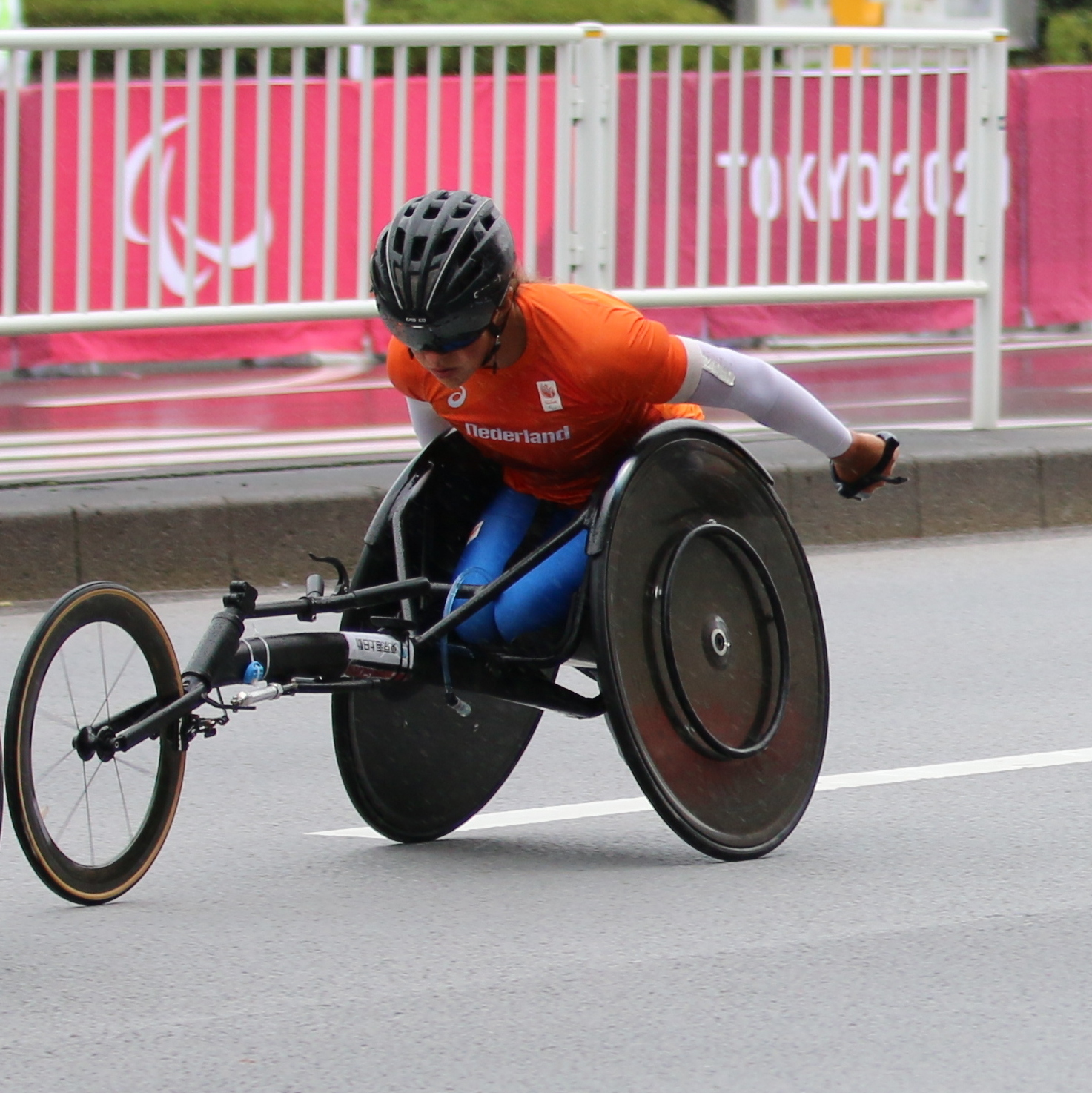
- Den Boer competing in the women's marathon T54 at the 2020 Summer Paralympics

Personal information
- Citizenship: Netherlands
- Born: 8 January 1991 (age 35) Haarlem, Netherlands
- Home town: Haarlem, Netherlands

Sport
- Country: Netherlands
- Sport: Wheelchair racing
- Disability class: T54
- Club: KAV Holland
- Team: Red Velvet Racing Team
- Coached by: Arno Mul
Medal record
Women's para-athletics
Representing Netherlands
Paralympic Games
Bronze medal – third place	2020 Tokyo	Marathon T54
European Championships
Silver medal – second place	2021 Bydgoszcz	1500 m T54
Silver medal – second place	2021 Bydgoszcz	5000 m T54
Bronze medal – third place	2021 Bydgoszcz	800 m T54

Nikita den Boer (born 8 January 1991) is a Dutch wheelchair racer. She won the bronze medal in the women's marathon T54 event at the 2020 Summer Paralympics held in Tokyo, Japan.

In 2020, she won the women's wheelchair race at the London Marathon in London, United Kingdom.

== Career ==
In 2014, Den Boer became an ambassador of the Johan Cruyff Foundation which aims to improve sport opportunities for children with disabilities.

Den Boer finished in 8th place in the women's wheelchair race at the 2019 London Marathon in London, United Kingdom. In the same year, she broke the Dutch national women's 5000 metres T54 at a race in Switzerland, and finished in 4th place in the women's 5000 metres T54 event at the 2019 World Para Athletics Championships held in Dubai, United Arab Emirates. It was her first race at a global tournament. Den Boer won the 2020 London Marathon in October 2020. As a result, she qualified to represent the Netherlands at the 2020 Summer Paralympics in Tokyo, Japan.

In 2021, Den Boer won the silver medal in the women's 1500 metres T54 and women's 5000 metres T54 events at the World Para Athletics European Championships held in Bydgoszcz, Poland. She also won the bronze medal in the women's 800 metres T54 event.

At the 2020 Summer Paralympics in Tokyo, Japan, Den Boer won the bronze medal in the women's marathon T54 event. She also finished in 4th place in the women's 5000 metres T54 event with a new personal best of 11:15.37. She finished in 7th place in the women's 1500 metres T54 event.

== Personal life ==
She lives in Haarlem, Netherlands.

== Achievements ==
Year	Competition	Venue	Position	Event	Notes
Representing Netherlands
2019	London Marathon	London, United Kingdom	8th	Marathon	1:52:12
2019	World Championships	Dubai, United Arab Emirates	4th	5000 m	12:16.00
2020	London Marathon	London, United Kingdom	1st	Marathon	1:40:07
2021	European Championships	Bydgoszcz, Poland	2nd	1500 m	3:38.99
2021	European Championships	Bydgoszcz, Poland	3rd	800 m	1:52.65
2021	European Championships	Bydgoszcz, Poland	2nd	5000 m	11:54.17
2021	Summer Paralympics	Tokyo, Japan	4th	5000 m	11:15.37
2021	Summer Paralympics	Tokyo, Japan	7th	1500 m	3:29.11
2021	Summer Paralympics	Tokyo, Japan	3rd	Marathon	1:38:16
2021	London Marathon	London, United Kingdom	4th	Marathon	1:44:54
2024	London Marathon	London, United Kingdom	9th	Marathon	1:50:45
2024	Chicago Marathon	Chicago, United States	5th	Marathon	1:46:18
