= Susannah Scaroni =

American Paralympic athlete (born 1991)

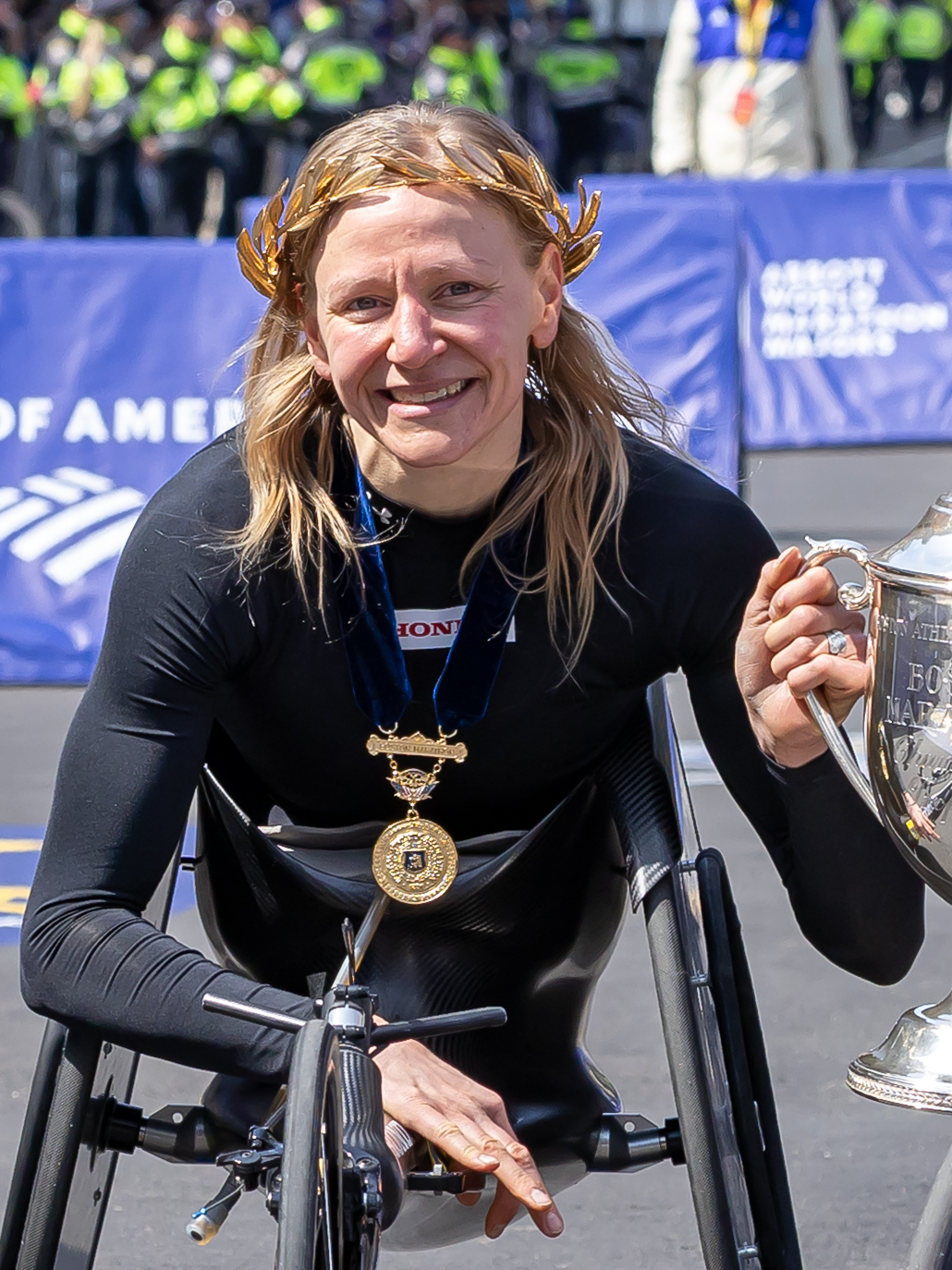
- Scaroni after winning at the 2025 Boston Marathon

Personal information
- Born: May 16, 1991 (age 35) Burns, Oregon, U.S.
- Home town: Tekoa, Washington, U.S.
- Education: University of Illinois Urbana-Champaign
- Occupations: Para-athlete, dietitian
- Height: 1.65 m (5 ft 5 in)

Sport
- Country: United States
- Sport: Wheelchair racing
- Disability: Paraplegia
- Disability class: T54
- University team: Illinois Fighting Illini
Medal record
Representing United States
Paralympic Games
Gold medal – first place	2020 Tokyo	5000 m T54
Silver medal – second place	2024 Paris	5000 m T54
Bronze medal – third place	2020 Tokyo	800 m T54
Bronze medal – third place	2024 Paris	800 m T54
Bronze medal – third place	2024 Paris	1500 m T54
Bronze medal – third place	2024 Paris	Marathon T54
World Championships
Bronze medal – third place	2019 Dubai	800 m T54
Bronze medal – third place	2019 Dubai	5000 m T54
Bronze medal – third place	2023 Paris	5000 m T54

Susannah Scaroni (born May 16, 1991) is an American Paralympic athlete. She won the gold medal in the women's 5000 meters T54 event at the 2020 Summer Paralympics held in Tokyo, Japan and the silver in the same event in Paris, 2024. She also represented the United States at the 2012 Summer Paralympics and at the 2016 Summer Paralympics.

== Early life ==
Scaroni injured her spinal cord at the T12 vertebra in a car accident when she was five years old, and had to use a wheelchair thereafter.

== Career ==
At the 2012 Summer Paralympics, she finished in 8th place in the women's marathon T54 event. Four years later, she also competed in the same event finishing in 7th place. She also competed in the women's 800 meters T54 event at the 2016 Summer Paralympics where she did not qualify to compete in the final.

In 2018, she won the Peachtree Road Race held in Atlanta, Georgia in the wheelchair category with a time of 22:49.05.

In 2019, she competed at the World Para Athletics Championships winning the bronze medals in the women's 5000 m T54 and women's 800 m T54 events.

She represented the United States at the 2020 Summer Paralympics in Tokyo, Japan.

In 2022 she won the 2022 Open Women's Division of the Shepherd Center Wheelchair Division of the AJC Peachtree Road Race in Atlanta with the time 21:14.71 setting a new course record.

She trains with the University of Illinois wheelchair racing team.

=== Marathons ===
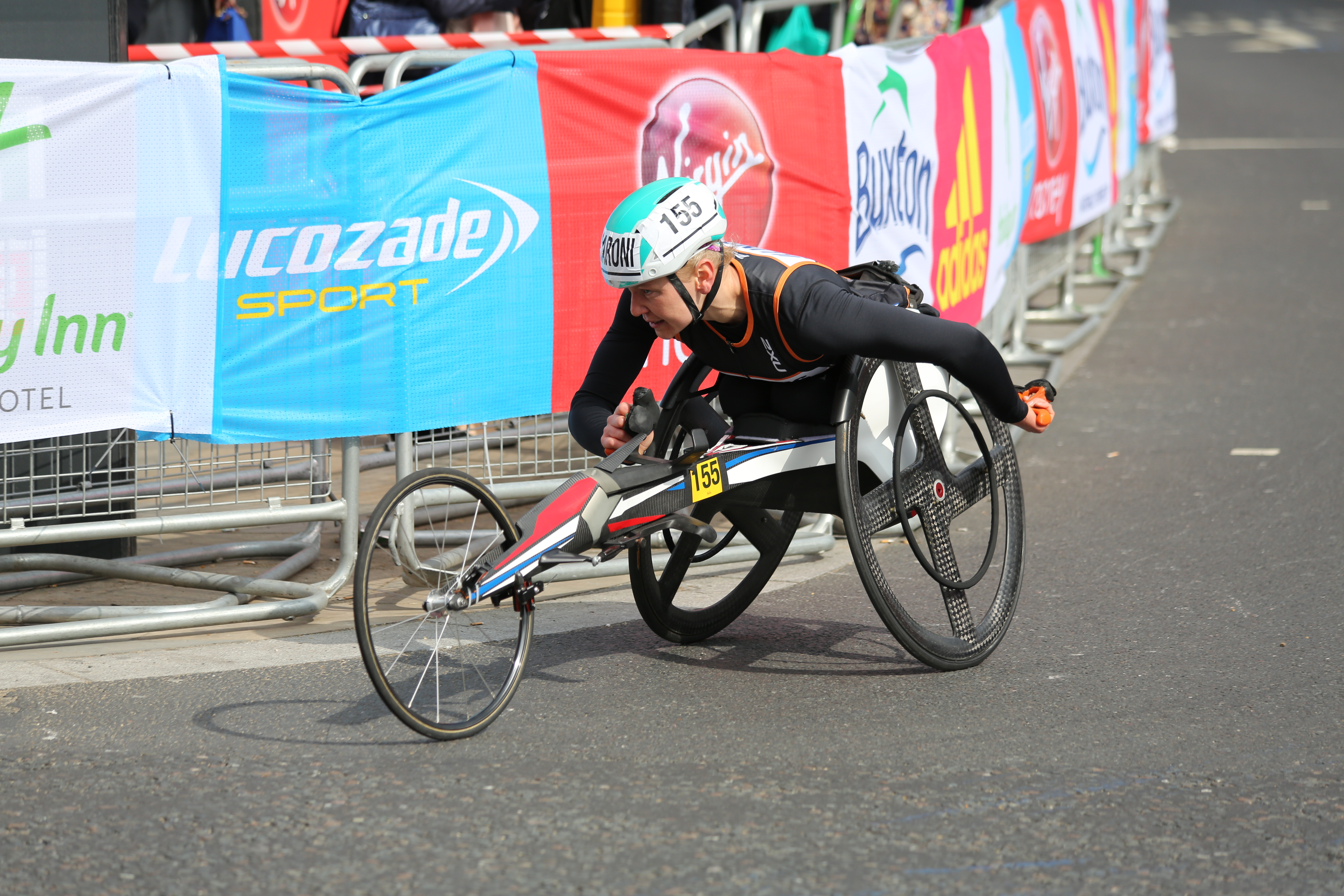
Scaroni at the 2017 London Marathon

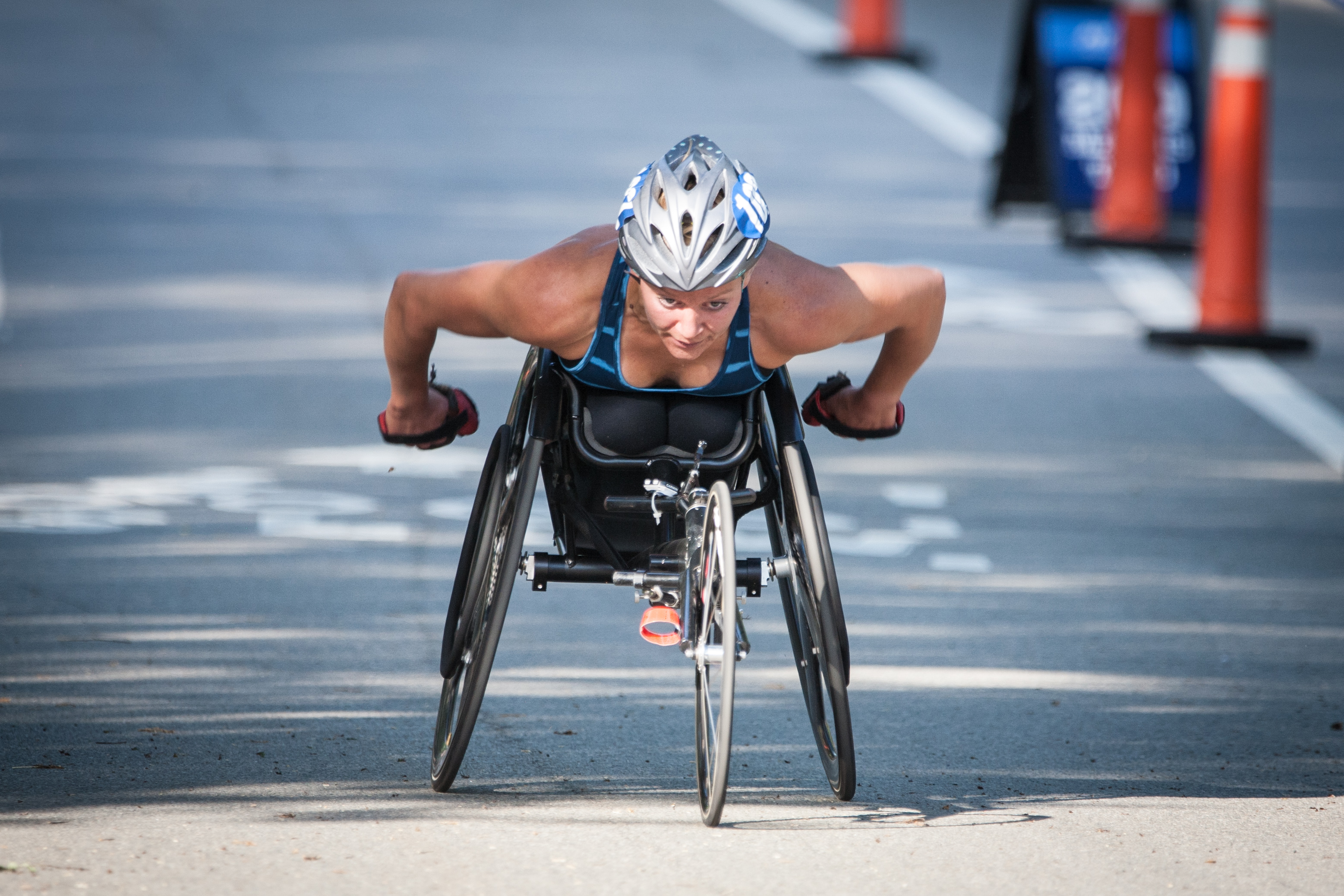
Sacroni in 2018

Scaroni has also competed in numerous marathon competitions including most marathons that are part of the World Marathon Majors.

In the Chicago Marathon she won 1st place in 2022 and 2025, and finished in 2nd place in the 2012, 3rd in the 2018 and 4th in 2019.

In the London Marathon Scaroni also finished in 7th place both in 2013 and 2016, 4th in 2014, 5th in 2015, and 3rd both in 2017 and 2018.

In the Boston Marathon she ended up in 3rd place in 2014, 2015 and 2017, 4th in 2016, 2nd in 2018, 1st in 2023, and 1st in 2025.

In the Tokyo Marathon Scaroni ended it in 5th place in 2018 and 3rd in 2019.

In 2019, she also ended in 3rd in the New York City Marathon.

In 2013 and 2014, Scaroni won the Los Angeles Marathon in the wheelchair category.

She was placed 6th in the women's marathon T54 event at the 2020 Summer Paralympics in Tokyo, Japan. She won a bronze medal at the 2024 Paralympics in Paris in the T54 Marathon. Catherine Debrunner had led from the start and Madisson de Rozario came second.

== Achievements ==
Year	Competition	Venue	Position	Event	Notes
Representing United States
2012	Summer Paralympics	London, United Kingdom	8th	Marathon	1:58:37
2012	Chicago Marathon	Chicago, United States	2nd	Marathon	1:56:30
2013	Los Angeles Marathon	Los Angeles, United States	1st	Marathon	1:54:39
2013	London Marathon	London, United Kingdom	7th	Marathon	1:50:47
2014	Los Angeles Marathon	Los Angeles, United States	1st	Marathon	1:54:54
2014	London Marathon	London, United Kingdom	4th	Marathon	1:51:01
2014	Boston Marathon	Boston, United States	3rd	Marathon	1:38:33
2015	Boston Marathon	Boston, United States	3rd	Marathon	1:57:21
2015	London Marathon	London, United Kingdom	5th	Marathon	1:47:06
2016	Boston Marathon	Boston, United States	4th	Marathon	1:46:53
2016	London Marathon	London, United Kingdom	7th	Marathon	1:52:50
2016	Summer Paralympics	Rio de Janeiro, Brazil	6th (heats)	800 m	1:56.42
2016	Summer Paralympics	Rio de Janeiro, Brazil	7th	Marathon	1:38:47
2017	Boston Marathon	Boston, United States	3rd	Marathon	1:33:17
2017	London Marathon	London, United Kingdom	3rd	Marathon	1:47:37
2018	Tokyo Marathon	Tokyo, Japan	5th	Marathon	1:54:02
2018	Boston Marathon	Boston, United States	2nd	Marathon	2:20:01
2018	London Marathon	London, United Kingdom	3rd	Marathon	1:43:00
2018	Peachtree Road Race	Atlanta, United States	1st	10,000 m	22:49.05
2018	Chicago Marathon	Chicago, United States	3rd	Marathon	1:44:48
2019	Tokyo Marathon	Tokyo, Japan	3rd	Marathon	1:54:32
2019	Chicago Marathon	Chicago, United States	4th	Marathon	
2019	New York City Marathon	New York City, United States	3rd	Marathon	1:51:37
2021	Summer Paralympics	Tokyo, Japan	1st	5000 m	10:52.57
2021	Summer Paralympics	Tokyo, Japan	3rd	800 m	1:44.43
2021	Summer Paralympics	Tokyo, Japan	6th	Marathon	1:41:04
2022	Chicago 13.1	Chicago, United States	1st	Half Marathon	46:07
2022	New York Mini 10K	New York City, United States	1st	10K	0:21:10
2022	B.A.A. 10K	Boston, United States	1st	10K	0:21:56
2022	Grandma's Marathon	Duluth, Minnesota – United States	1st	Marathon	1:27:31
2022	Peachtree Road Race	Atlanta, United States	1st	10K	21:14.71
2022	London Marathon	London, United Kingdom	2nd	Marathon	1:42.21
2022	Berlin Marathon	Berlin, Germany	3rd	Marathon	1:36.51
2022	Chicago Marathon	Chicago, United States	1st	Marathon	1:45.48
2022	New York City Marathon	New York City, United States	1st	Marathon	1:42:43
2022	Ōita International Wheelchair Marathon	Ōita City, Japan	2nd	Marathon	1:38:01
2023	Boston Marathon	Boston, United States	1st	Marathon	1:41:45
2025	Boston Marathon	Boston, United States	1st	Marathon	1:35:20
2025	Tokyo Marathon	Tokyo, Japan	2nd	Marathon	1:36.28
2025	Sydney Marathon	Sydney, Australia	1st	Marathon	1:44.52
2025	Chicago Marathon	Chicago, United States	1st	Marathon	1:38.14
2025	New York City Marathon	New York City, United States	1st	Marathon	1:42.10
