= 2021 World Para Athletics European Championships =

Sporting competition

World Para Athletics European Championships
- Host city: Bydgoszcz
- Country: Poland
- Nations: 44
- Athletes: 674
- Dates: 1–5 June 2021
- Main venue: Zdzisław Krzyszkowiak Stadium

The 2021 World Para Athletics European Championships was a track and field competition for athletes with a disability open to International Paralympic Committee (IPC) affiliated countries within Europe and a refugee team with one athlete. This was the 7th edition of the event. This was also the first time that the event was held in Poland. Around 670 athletes competed at the event.

== History ==
The event was originally scheduled to be held between 3 and 7 June 2020. On 26 March 2020, it was announced that the event would be postponed as a result of the COVID-19 pandemic, and in June it was confirmed that the postponement would be until 2021.

== Venue ==
The venue for the event was the Zdzisław Krzyszkowiak Stadium.

=== Schedule ===
As of June 2021.

Date →		Tues 1 June	Wed 2 June	Thurs 3 June	Fri 4 June	Sat 5 June
100 m	Men; Details	T47; T53; T54	T13; T35; T36; T37; T63; T64	T38; T52	RR1; RR3	T11; T12; T33/34; T51
100 m	Women; Details	T11; T53; T54; T63	T13; T38	T34; T64	RR1; RR3; T12; T36	T35; T37; T47
200 m	Men; Details		T51	T64	T37	T35
200 m	Women; Details		T35; T36	T37; T47		T11; T12; T64
400 m	Men; Details	T20; T52	T38	T11; T13; T37; T47; T53; T54	T12; T62	T36; T44
400 m	Women; Details	T37; T47	T12; T20	T53; T54	T11; T13; T20; T62	T38
800 m	Men; Details				T53; T54	
800 m	Women; Details				T53; T54	T34
1500 m	Men; Details		T46; T54		T11; T13; T20; T52	T38
1500 m	Women; Details	T11; T13	T20; T54			
5000 m	Men; Details	T13	T11			T54
5000 m	Women; Details					T54
4×100 m relay	Universal; Details				Mixed	
High jump	Men; Details			T42/44/63/64; T47		
Long jump	Men; Details	T11; T38; T64	T12	T36; T63	T20	T13; T37; T47
Long jump	Women; Details		T11; T37; T47	T12; T63	T20; T38; T64	T62
Shot put	Men; Details	F12; F33; F40; F41; F55	F11; F20; F34	F37; F53	F32; F35; F36; F46	F57; T63
Shot put	Women; Details	F20	F40; F54; F57	F34; F36; F37; F41	F12; F32	F33; F35
Discus throw	Men; Details			F56	F52; F64	F11; F37
Discus throw	Women; Details	F38; F55; F64	F11/12		F53	F41
Javelin throw	Men; Details	F46	F37/38; F57; F64		F13; F34	F41; F54
Javelin throw	Women; Details	F34		F13; F56		F46; F54
Club throw	Men; Details	F32	F51			
Club throw	Women; Details		F51	F32		

== Summary ==
=== Medal table ===
* Host nation (Poland)

Rank	Nation	Gold	Silver	Bronze	Total
1	Russia (RUS)	31	25	18	74
2	Ukraine (UKR)	17	13	9	39
3	Poland (POL)*	15	20	14	49
4	Great Britain (GBR)	14	9	14	37
5	France (FRA)	8	11	11	30
6	Netherlands (NED)	8	11	4	23
7	Switzerland (SUI)	8	4	6	18
8	Turkey (TUR)	6	7	4	17
9	Spain (ESP)	5	12	10	27
10	Germany (GER)	5	5	6	16
11	Finland (FIN)	5	1	2	8
12	Serbia (SRB)	4	3	4	11
13	Czech Republic (CZE)	4	3	1	8
14	Greece (GRE)	4	2	5	11
15	Croatia (CRO)	4	2	4	10
16	Azerbaijan (AZE)	3	1	2	6
17	Denmark (DEN)	2	2	2	6
18	Italy (ITA)	2	1	7	10
19	Hungary (HUN)	2	1	1	4
19	Ireland (IRL)	2	1	1	4
21	Austria (AUT)	2	0	1	3
22	Lithuania (LTU)	1	4	2	7
23	Portugal (POR)	1	1	3	5
24	Belgium (BEL)	1	1	1	3
25	Bulgaria (BUL)	1	1	0	2
25	Norway (NOR)	1	1	0	2
27	Latvia (LAT)	1	0	1	2
28	Belarus (BLR)	0	5	1	6
29	Slovakia (SVK)	0	3	0	3
30	Iceland (ISL)	0	1	1	2
30	Sweden (SWE)	0	1	1	2
32	Luxembourg (LUX)	0	1	0	1
33	Montenegro (MNE)	0	0	1	1
Totals (33 entries)		157	153	137	447

=== Multi-medalists ===
Medalists who have won at least three medals or more.

Rank	Name	Country	Medal	Event
1	Pierre Fairbank	France	Gold; Gold; Gold	Men's 100m T53; Men's 400m T53; Men's 800m T53
1	Marcel Hug	Switzerland	Gold; Gold; Gold	Men's 800m T54; Men's 1500m T54; Men's 5000m T54
1	Andrei Vdovin	Russia	Gold; Gold; Gold	Men's 100m T37; Men's 200m T37; Men's 400m T37
4	Merle Menje	Germany	Gold; Gold; Silver; Silver	Women's 400m T54; Women's 5000m T54; Women's 100m T54; Women's 800m T54
5	Luca Ekler	Hungary	Gold; Gold; Silver	Women's 400m T38; Women's long jump T38; Women's 100m T38
5	Saska Sokolov	Serbia	Gold; Gold; Silver	Women's 100m T47; Women's 200m T47; Women's javelin throw F46
7	Anastasiia Soloveva	Russia	Gold; Gold; Bronze; Bronze	Women's 400m T47; Universal 4x100m relay Women's 100m T47; Women's 200m T47
8	Catherine Debrunner	Switzerland	Gold; Gold; Bronze	Women's 100m T53; Women's 400m T53; Women's 1500m T54
8	Mandy Francois-Elie	France	Gold; Gold; Bronze	Women's 100m T37; Women's 200m T37; Universal 4x100m relay
8	Yuliia Pavlenko	Ukraine	Gold; Gold; Bronze	Women's 100m T11; Women's long jump T11; Women's 200m T11
11	Nataliia Kobzar	Ukraine	Gold; Silver; Silver	Women's 400m T37; Women's 100m T37; Women's 200m T37
11	Marlene van Gansewinkel	Netherlands	Gold; Silver; Silver	Women's 200m T64; Women's 100m T64; Women's long jump T64
13	Aleksei Bychenok	Russia	Gold; Silver; Bronze	Universal 4x100m relay Men's 5000m T54; Men's 1500m T54
14	Viktoriia Slanova	Russia	Gold; Bronze; Bronze; Bronze	Universal 4x100m relay Women's 100m T37; Women's 200m T37; Women's 400m T37
15	Hamide Kurt	Turkey	Silver; Silver; Silver	Women's 100m T53; Women's 400m T53; Women's 800m T53
16	Nikita den Boer	Netherlands	Silver; Silver; Bronze	Women's 1500m T54; Women's 5000m T54; Women's 800m T54
16	Gerard Descarrega Puigdevall	Spain	Silver; Silver; Bronze	Men's 400m T11; Men's long jump T11; Men's 100m T11
16	Margarita Goncharova	Russia	Silver; Silver; Bronze	Women's 400m T38; Women's long jump T38; Women's 100m T38
16	Vitalii Gritsenko	Russia	Silver; Silver; Bronze	Men's 400m T53; Men's 800m T54; Men's 100m T53
20	Nicolas Brignone	France	Silver; Bronze; Bronze	Men's 100m T53; Men's 400m T53; Men's 800m T53
20	Julien Casoli	France	Silver; Bronze; Bronze	Men's 800m T54; Men's 5000m T54; Universal 4x100m relay
20	Chermen Kobesov	Russia	Silver; Bronze; Bronze	Men's long jump T37; Men's 100m T37; Men's 200m T37
20	Nathan Maguire	Great Britain	Silver; Bronze; Bronze	Universal 4x100m relay Men's 400m T54; Men's 800m T54

== Representing countries ==
As of 30 April 2021.

- Armenia (3)
- Austria (4)
- Azerbaijan (6)
- Belarus (16)
- Belgium (8)
- Bosnia and Herzegovina (1)
- Bulgaria (8)
- Croatia (15)
- Cyprus (3)
- Czech Republic (25)
- Denmark (15)
- Estonia (1)
- Finland (10)
- France (40)
- Georgia (2)
- Germany (15)
- Great Britain (43)
- Greece (31)
- Hungary (7)
- Iceland (5)
- Ireland (6)
- Israel (2)
- Italy (20)
- Latvia (5)
- Lithuania (16)
- Luxembourg (1)
- Malta (1)
- Moldova (5)
- Montenegro (5)
- Netherlands (17)
- Norway (8)
- Poland (74) Host country
- Portugal (19)
- IPC Refugee Para Team (1)
- Romania (7)
- Russia (80)
- Serbia (14)
- Slovakia (8)
- Slovenia (1)
- Spain (43)
- Sweden (6)
- Switzerland (12)
- Turkey (30)
- Ukraine (31)

== See also ==
- 2020 World Para Swimming European Open Championships
