= Manuela Schär =

Swiss Paralympic athlete

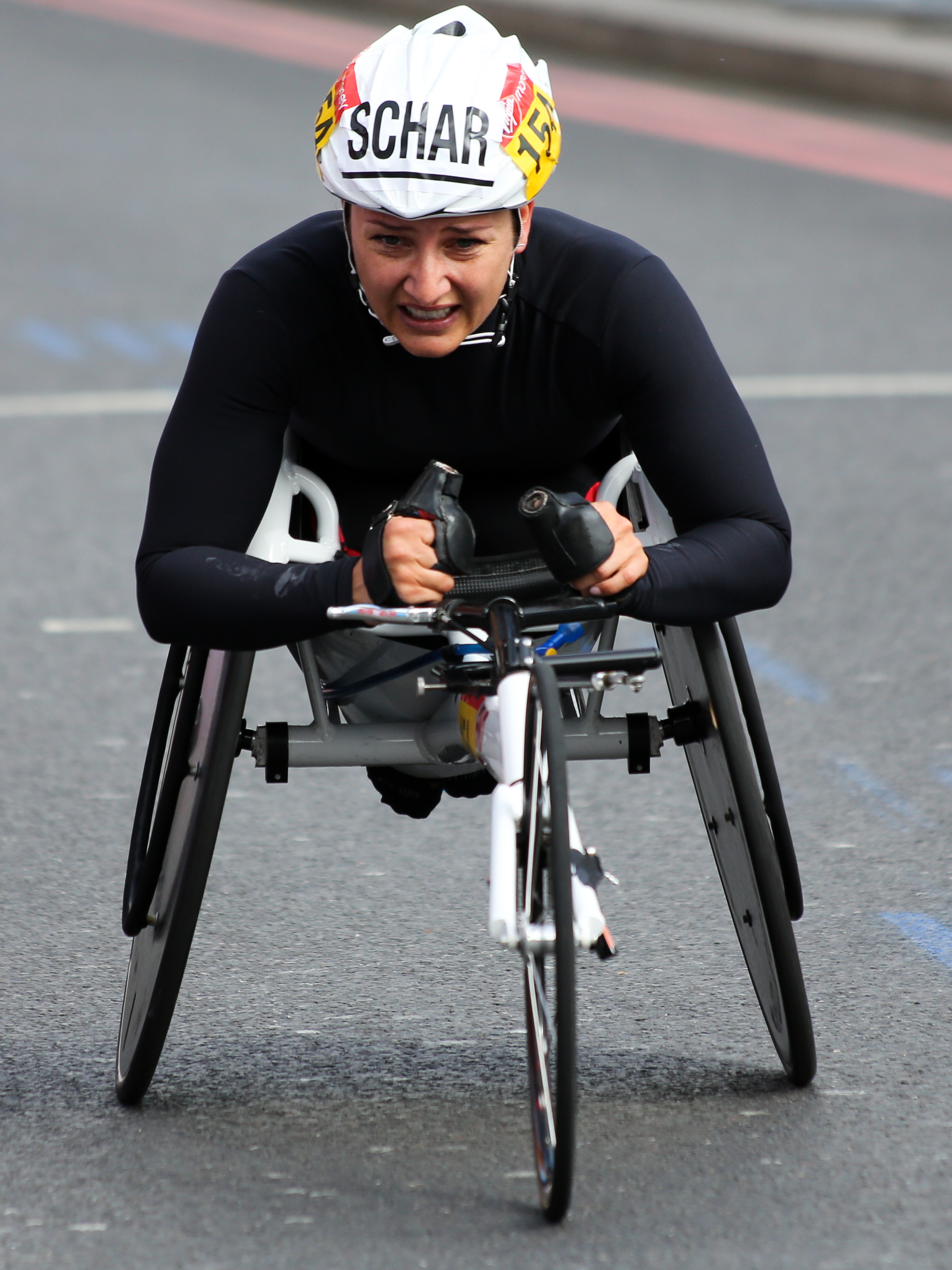
- Schär competing in the 2017 London Marathon

Personal information
- Born: Manuela Schär; 5 December 1984 (age 41)
- Height: 1.65 m (5 ft 5 in)
- Weight: 46 kg (101 lb)

Sport
- Disability: Spinal cord injury
- Disability class: T54
- Coached by: Claudio Perret
Medal record
Women's paralympic athletics
Representing Switzerland
Paralympic Games
Gold medal – first place	2020 Tokyo	400m T54
Gold medal – first place	2020 Tokyo	800m T54
Gold medal – first place	2024 Paris	800 m T54
Silver medal – second place	2004 Athens	200 m T54
Silver medal – second place	2020 Tokyo	5000 m T54
Silver medal – second place	2020 Tokyo	1500 m T54
Silver medal – second place	2020 Tokyo	Marathon T54
Silver medal – second place	2024 Paris	400 m T54
Bronze medal – third place	2004 Athens	100 m T54
Bronze medal – third place	2008 Beijing	200 m T54
World Championships
Gold medal – first place	2013 Lyon	Marathon T54
Gold medal – first place	2023 Paris	800 m T54
Gold medal – first place	2023 Paris	400 m T54
Silver medal – second place	2013 Lyon	400 m T54
Silver medal – second place	2013 Lyon	800 m T54
Silver medal – second place	2013 Lyon	5000 m T54
Silver medal – second place	2023 Paris	5000 m T54
Silver medal – second place	2023 Paris	1500m T54
Bronze medal – third place	2011 Christchurch	200 m T54
Bronze medal – third place	2011 Christchurch	400 m T54
European Championships
Gold medal – first place	2014 Swansea	400 m T54
Gold medal – first place	2014 Swansea	800 m T54
Gold medal – first place	2014 Swansea	1500 m T54

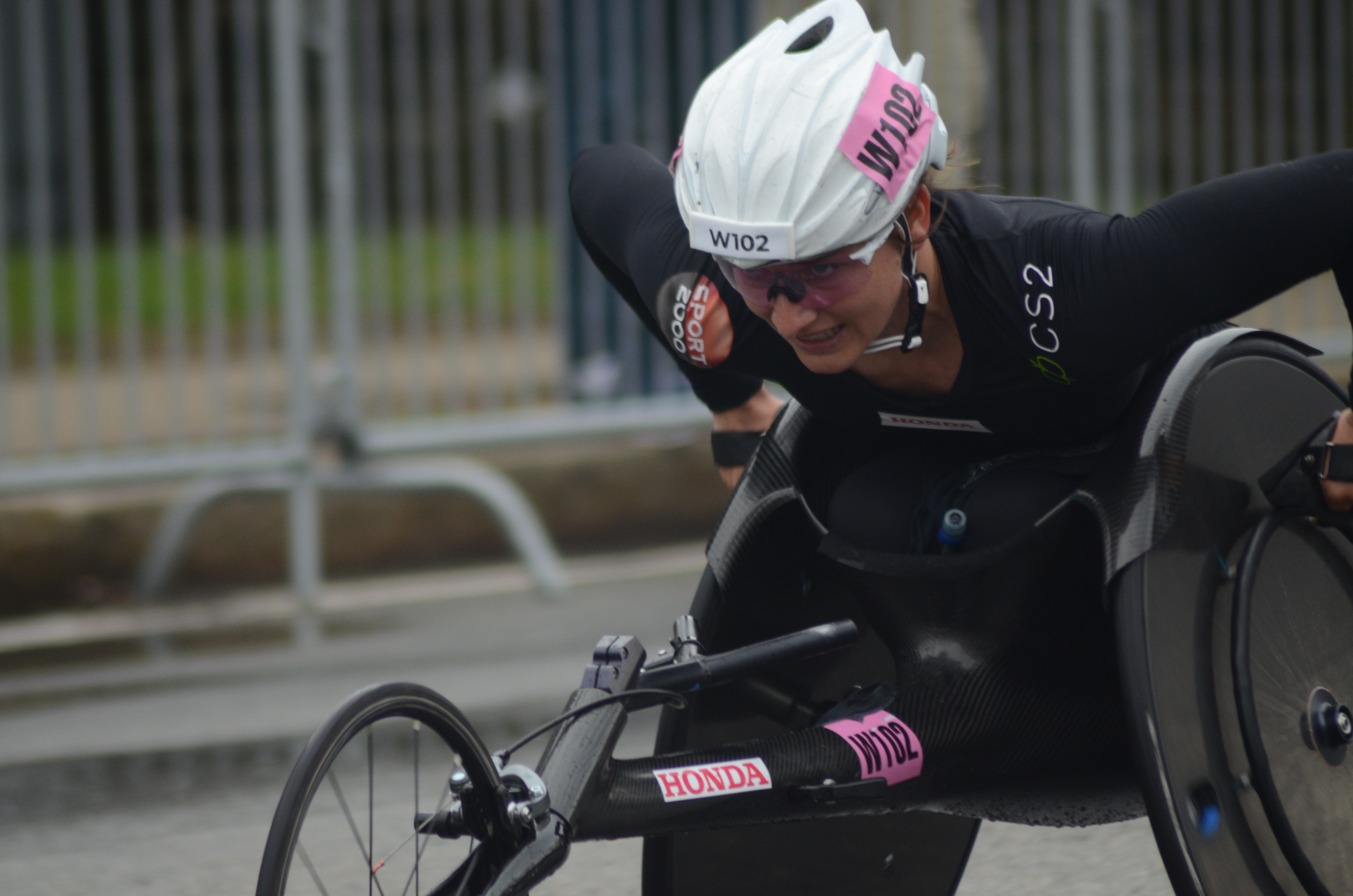
Schär near half way mark of 2019 Boston Marathon, which she won

Manuela Schär (born December 5, 1984) is a paralympic athlete from Switzerland, competing mainly in category T54 sprint events. In the T54 category she is a three-time gold medal winner at the Summer Paralympics, and a three-time gold medal winner at the World Para Athletics Championships. She has used a wheelchair since the age of 8, when a playground accident paralyzed her from the waist down.

== Career ==
Schär competed in the 2004 Summer Paralympics in Athens, Greece. There she won a silver medal in the women's 200 meters (T54 event), bronze in the women's 100 meters (T54 event), and finished sixth in the women's 400 meters (T54 event). At the 2008 Summer Paralympics in Beijing, China, she won bronze in the women's 200 meters (T54) event, finishing fourth in the 100 meters and sixth again in the women's 400 meters. She competed again in the 2012 Summer Paralympics in London, where her best results were two fifth places.

At the 2013 IPC Athletics World Championships in Lyon, France, she won gold in the marathon (T54 event).

In 2017, she won the women's wheelchair category of the 121st Boston Marathon and the 37th London Marathon. In 2018, she won the women's wheelchair category of the 2018 Chicago Marathon and the 2018 TCS New York City Marathon. In 2019, she won all six World Marathon Majors (Tokyo, Boston, London, Berlin, Chicago and New York).

As of September 2026, she had won all seven World Marathon Majors and many multiple times, including the Berlin Marathon seven times, the Boston Marathon and Tokyo Marathon four times each, the London Marathon and New York Marathon three times each and both the Chicago Marathon and Sydney Marathon once..

At the 2020 Summer Paralympics in Tokyo, Japan, competing in the T54 events, she won gold in the 400m and 800m, and silver in the 1500m, 5000m, and marathon.

Schär won gold in the 400m and 800m (T54 events) at the 2023 World Para Athletics Championships in Paris, France.Athletics Results | World Para Athletics

The following year, also in Paris, she won her third Paralympics gold medal, competing in the T54 800m.Athletics Results | World Para Athletics

In 2026, she became the first woman to have won all seven World Marathon Majors, by winning the Sydney Marathon.
