= Patricia Eachus =

Swiss Paralympic athlete

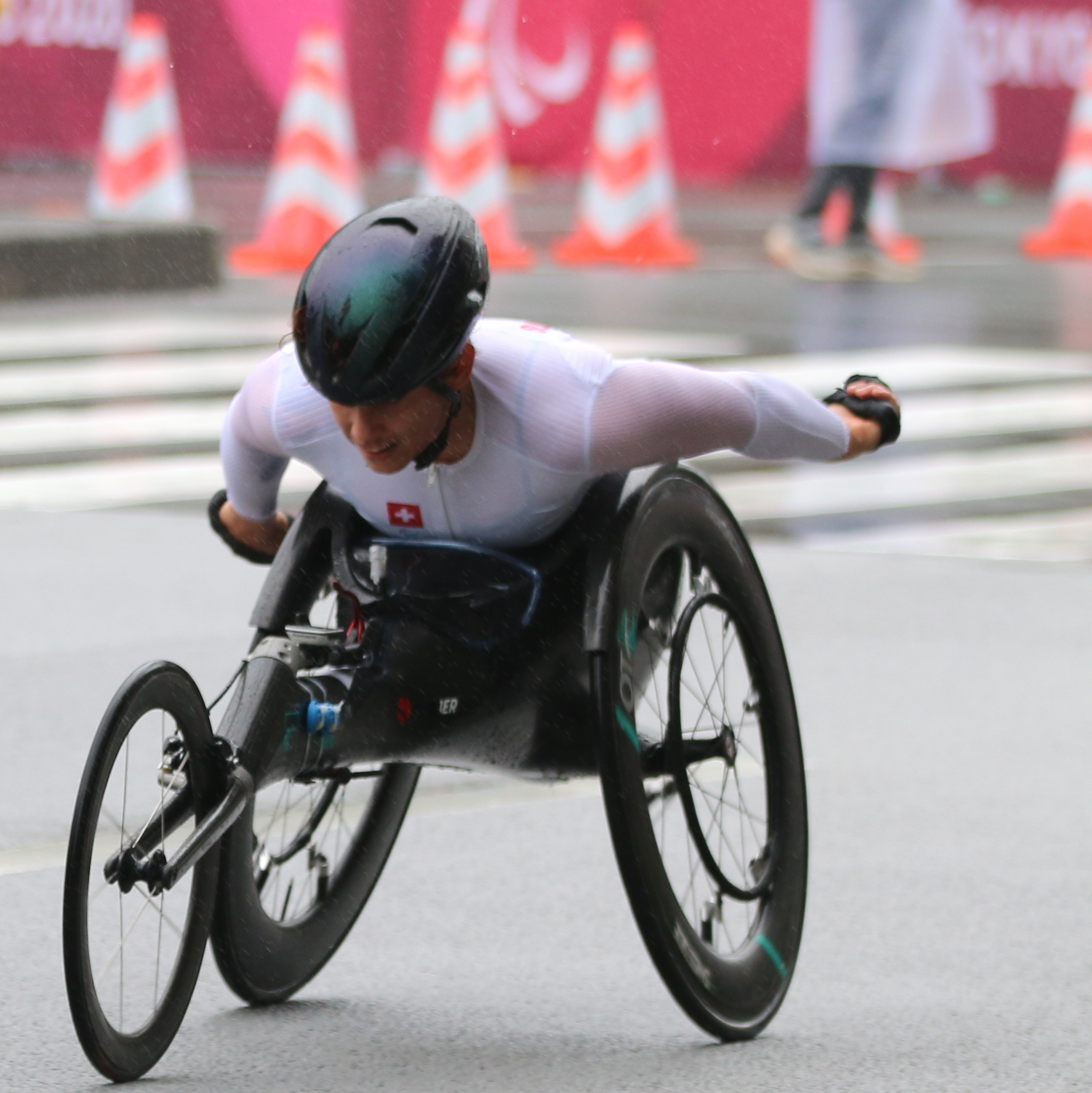
- in Tokyo at the Paralympics

Personal information
- Nationality: Swiss
- Born: 26 September 1989 (age 37) Zürich, Switzerland
- Home town: Nottwil, Switzerland
- Height: 1.43 m (4 ft 8 in)

Sport
- Country: Switzerland
- Sport: Paralympic athletics
- Disability: Spina bifida
- Disability class: T54
- Events: 400 metres 800 metres 1500 metres 5000 metres Marathon
- Club: RC Zentralschweiz, Malters
- Coached by: Georg Pfarrwaller
Medal record
Women's para athletics
Representing Switzerland
World Championships
Bronze medal – third place	2025 New Delhi	5000m T54
European Championships
Bronze medal – third place	2014 Swansea	1500m T54
Bronze medal – third place	2018 Berlin	400m T54

Patricia Eachus (née Keller, born 26 September 1989) is a Swiss Paralympic athlete who competes in middle-distance and long-distance racing events in international level events.

In 2020, she finished in 4th place in the women's wheelchair race at the 2020 London Marathon in London, United Kingdom.
