= Pauline Korikwiang =

Kenyan long-distance runner (born 1988)

Personal information
- Born: 1 March 1988 (age 38) Kaptabuk, Rift Valley Province, Kenya
Medal record
Women's athletics
Representing Kenya
World Cross Country Championships
Gold medal – first place	2006 Fukuoka	Junior race
World Junior Championships
Silver medal – second place	2006 Beijing	5000 m
All-Africa Games
Bronze medal – third place	2011 Maputo	5000 m
Bronze medal – third place	2011 Maputo	10,000 m

Pauline Chemning Korikwiang (born 1 March 1988) is a Kenyan professional long-distance runner who competes in track and cross country running competitions.

She rose in the youth ranks in 2005, taking a 3000 metres silver medal at the IAAF World Youth Championships in Athletics and took the world junior cross country title at the 2006 IAAF World Cross Country Championships. After winning youth medals on the track at World and African junior level, she has represented Kenya at the senior level in both cross country and the 10,000 metres at the African Championships in Athletics. She won two bronze medals at the 2011 All-Africa Games and a gold medal at the 2015 Military World Games.

== Career ==
Korikwiang was born in Kaptabuk and drew inspiration to become a runner from another local resident Tegla Loroupe, who broke world records in the half marathon. She began competed at the national junior level in 2003 and gained selection for the African Junior Athletics Championships that year, where she came fifth in the 5000 metres. A runner-up performance behind Veronica Nyaruai at the national junior cross country championships two years later led to her first world appearance, where she was seventh in the junior race at the 2005 IAAF World Cross Country Championships.

At the 2005 World Youth Championships in Athletics she was again outdone by Nyaruai, but defeated the rest of the field to win the silver medal over 3000 metres. The 2006 IAAF World Cross Country Championships saw Korikwiang defeat her rival to claim her first world junior title. There was a reversal of the positions at that year's 2006 World Junior Championships in Athletics, where Korikwiang was the 5000 metres silver medallist behind her rival. She was named as the most promising sportswoman at the end-of-year SOYA Awards.

The following year she won the Kenyan junior cross title and assumed the lead in the global event at the 2007 IAAF World Cross Country Championships in Mombasa. However, an error with the final lap bell meant Korikwiang mistakenly treated the second to last lap as the ultimate one. Her premature efforts destroyed her chance at the title as she let others pass in the belief the race had ended and, after realising her mistake, she eventually dropped out having fainted mid-race in Mombasa's torrid conditions. In her final international junior competition she won the 5000 m bronze medal at the 2007 African Junior Athletics Championships.

In her first year as a senior, she won at the top-class Cinque Mulini cross country meeting in Italy. A fifth-place finish at the Kenyan trials earned her a spot for the senior world team, but she was dismissed from the team after coaches stated that she had not maintained her fitness in the buildup to the event. She failed to make the track team for the 2008 Summer Olympics later that summer. In 2009, a strong run of form on the Athletics Kenya Cross Country Series led to her being given a wild card entry into the senior race for the 2009 IAAF World Cross Country Championships. She came eleventh in the race, but was only the sixth best Kenyan at the event.

Korikwiang missed out on both the 2009 World Championships in Athletics and the 2010 IAAF World Cross Country Championships and decided to switch to a new event, the 10,000 metres, instead. The move paid off as she took second place to Meselech Melkamu in her debut at the Golden Spike Ostrava, setting a personal best of 31:06.29 minutes. A runner-up performance behind reigning world champion Linet Masai at the Kenyan championships led to an appearance at the 2010 African Championships in Athletics (where she was sixth in the event). She was selected for the national team at the International Chiba Ekiden in November, but despite gaining the lead on the anchor leg, she relinquished her position and Japan's collegiate team beat the Kenyans to the title.

Her focus returned to cross country in 2011, as she won at the Cross Zornotza, came third at the Cross Internacional de Itálica, and then gained selection at the national championships. She came seventh at the 2011 IAAF World Cross Country Championships and was part of the winning Kenyan women's team. She travelled to the United States the following month and was edged into second at the Carlsbad 5000 by Aheza Kiros. She competed on the 2011 IAAF Diamond League circuit and set a 5000 m best of 14:41.28 minutes in Shanghai. Having finished fourth at the national trials, she did not gain selection for the World Championships that year, but instead competed at the 2011 All-Africa Games in Maputo, where she won bronze medals over both 5000 m and 10,000 m.

She was third at the Elgoibar Cross Country, Trofeo Alasport and Carlsbad 5000 races at the start of 2012. She skipped the rest of the season after failing to make the Kenyan Olympic team and only returned in the 2015 season. She won gold at the Military World Games, taking the 5000 m gold medal with a time of 15:23.85 minutes. She was runner-up at the Nairobi Half Marathon later that month but again competed infrequently, with the next highlight being a win at the Eldoret Half Marathon at the end of 2017.

== Competition record ==
Year	Competition	Venue	Position	Event	Notes
Representing Kenya
2003	African Junior Championships	Garoua, Cameroon	4th	5000 m	16:58.26
2005	World Cross Country Championships	Saint-Galmier, France	7th	Junior race (6.153 km)	20:56
2005	World Cross Country Championships	Saint-Galmier, France	1st	Junior team	16 pts
2005	World Youth Championships	Marrakesh, Morocco	2nd	3000 m	9:05.42
2006	World Cross Country Championships	Fukuoka, Japan	1st	Junior race (6 km)	19:27
2006	World Cross Country Championships	Fukuoka, Japan	1st	Junior team	10 pts
2006	World Junior Championships	Beijing, China	2nd	3000 m	9:05.21
2007	World Cross Country Championships	Mombasa, Kenya	—	Junior race (6 km)	DNF
2007	African Junior Championships	Ouagadougou, Burkina Faso	3rd	5000 m	15:59.61
2009	World Cross Country Championships	Amman, Jordan	11th	Senior race (8 km)	27:03
2010	African Championships	Nairobi, Kenya	5th	10,000 m	33:12.34
2011	All-Africa Games	Maputo, Mozambique	3rd	5000 m	15:40.93
2011	All-Africa Games	Maputo, Mozambique	3rd	10,000 m	33:26.17
2015	Military World Games	Mungyeong, South Korea	1st	5000 m	15:23.85
2018	African Championships	Asaba, Nigeria	–	10,000 m	DNF

== Personal bests ==
- 3000 metres – 8:41.11 min (2010)
- 5000 metres – 14:41.28 (2011)
- 10,000 metres – 31:06.29 (2010)
- Half Marathon – 1:12:03 (2015)
