= 2006 World Junior Championships in Athletics – Women's 3000 metres =

Sports championship

The women's 3000 metres event at the 2006 World Junior Championships in Athletics was held in Beijing, China, at Chaoyang Sports Centre on 19 August.

== Medalists ==
Gold	Veronica Wanjiru; Kenya
Silver	Pauline Korikwiang; Kenya
Bronze	Song Liwei; China

== Results ==
=== Final ===
19 August

Rank	Name	Nationality	Time	Notes
1st place, gold medalist(s)	Veronica Wanjiru	Kenya	9:02.90	
2nd place, silver medalist(s)	Pauline Korikwiang	Kenya	9:05.21	
3rd place, bronze medalist(s)	Song Liwei	China	9:06.35	
4	Belainesh Zemedkun	Ethiopia	9:10.92	
5	Viktoriya Ivanova	Russia	9:11.96	
6	Rie Takayoshi	Japan	9:13.15	
7	Barbara Maveau	Belgium	9:13.87	
8	Marta Romo	Spain	9:13.98	
9	Sayuri Sendo	Japan	9:14.33	
10	Azra Eminovic	Serbia	9:21.35	
11	Lara Tamsett	Australia	9:25.13	
12	Natalya Starkova	Russia	9:36.21	
13	Kareema Jasim	Bahrain	9:40.14	
14	Li Suyun	China	9:42.25	
15	Lucy Starrat	Australia	9:45.22	
	Julia Hiller	Germany	DNF	

== Participation ==
According to an unofficial count, 16 athletes from 11 countries participated in the event.

- Australia (2)
- Bahrain (1)
- Belgium (1)
- China (2)
- Ethiopia (1)
- Germany (1)
- Japan (2)
- Kenya (2)
- Russia (2)
- Serbia (1)
- Spain (1)
