= Bethwel =

Bethwel is a masculine given name. Notable people with the name include:

- Bethwel Henry (1934–2020), Micronesian politician
- Bethwel Yegon (born 1993), Kenyan marathon runner
