= 2023 New York City Marathon =

26.2 mi (42.195 km) race in New York, U.S.

52nd New York City Marathon
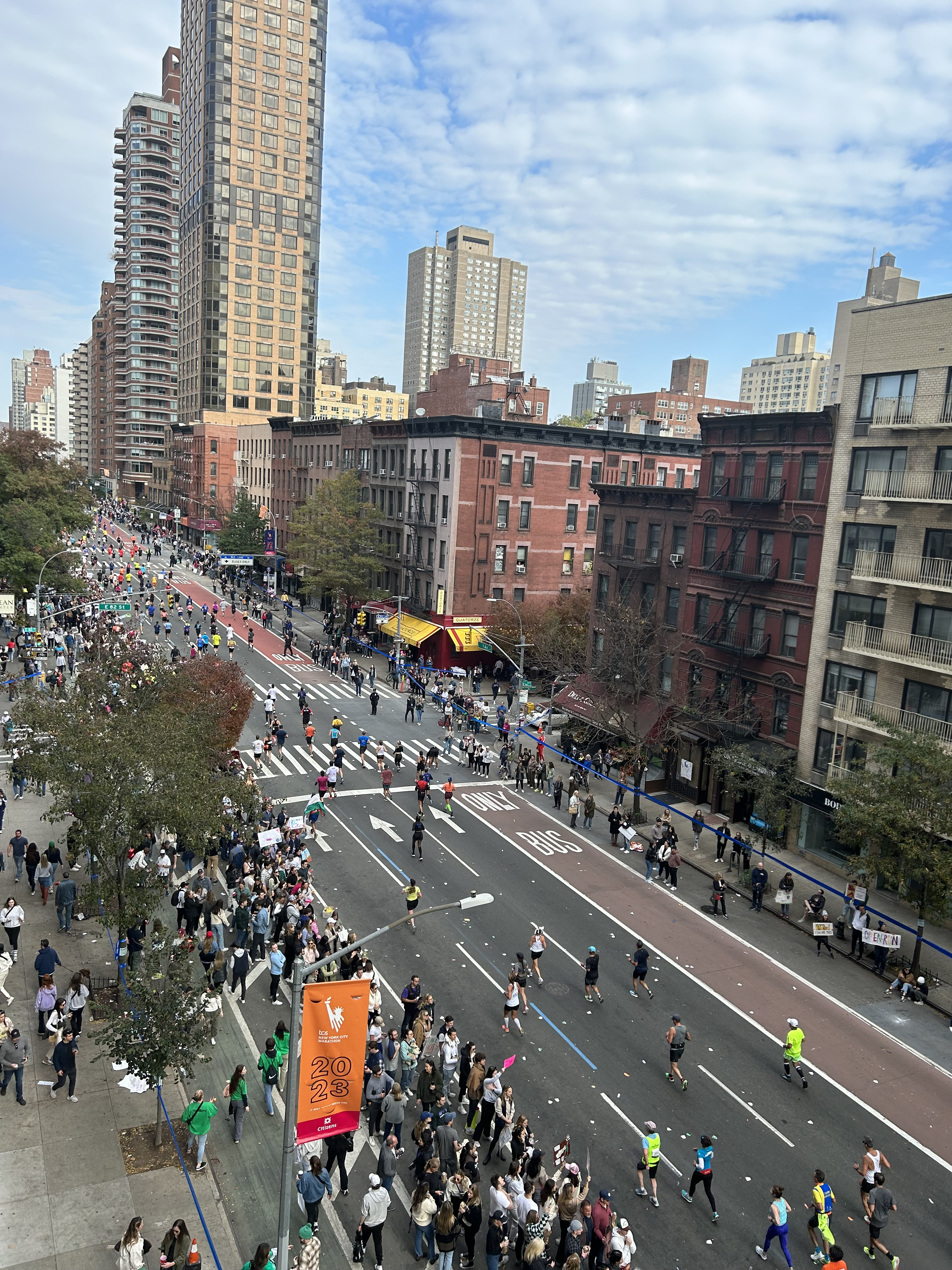
- View of 2023 New York City Marathon from 81st St. and 1st Ave. in Manhattan
- Location: New York City, New York, U.S.
- Dates: November 5, 2023 (2 years ago)
- Website: https://www.nyrr.org/tcsnycmarathon

Champions
- Men: Tamirat Tola (2:04:58)
- Women: Hellen Obiri (2:27:23)
- Wheelchair men: Marcel Hug (1:25:29)
- Wheelchair women: Catherine Debrunner (1:39:32)

The 2023 New York City Marathon was the 52nd edition of the annual New York City Marathon and was held on Sunday, November 5, 2023. A Platinum Label marathon, it was the last of six World Marathon Majors events in 2023.. The open division was won by Tamirat Tola of Ethiopia.

== Competitors ==
Evans Chebet of Kenya, who won the previous year's race with a time of 2:08:41, was expected to return to defend his title. His compatriot Geoffrey Kamworor, who won the New York City Marathon in 2017 and in 2019, had aimed to be the first runner to win the men's open division of the marathon thrice. (Note: Norwegian female runner Grete Waitz won the New York City Marathon nine times.) Kenyan runner Edward Cheserek, the most decorated athlete in the history of the National Collegiate Athletic Association (NCAA), was planning to debut at the marathon distance in this race.

Kenyan runner Sharon Lokedi, who won the previous year's race, her first marathon, with a time of 2:23:23, raced again and got third. Her compatriot Brigid Kosgei, who previously held the marathon world record after she won the 2019 Chicago Marathon with a time of 2:14:04, ran this race as her first New York City Marathon. (Note: Kosgei's record was broken when Ethiopian runner Tigst Assefa won the 2023 Berlin Marathon with a time of 2:11:53.) The previous year's runner-up, Israeli runner Lonah Chemtai Salpeter, was also expected to contest the title.

== Race summary ==
The 2023 edition of the New York City Marathon was the world's largest marathon in 2023 as of November 6, 2023, with 51,402 total finishers. It was the third largest edition of the New York City Marathon.

== Results ==
=== Men ===
Tamirat Tola of Ethiopia won the men's race, setting a course record with a time of 2:04:58. He was trailed by Albert Korir of Kenya, Shura Kitata of Ethiopia, Abdi Nageeye of the Netherlands, and Koen Naert of Belgium.

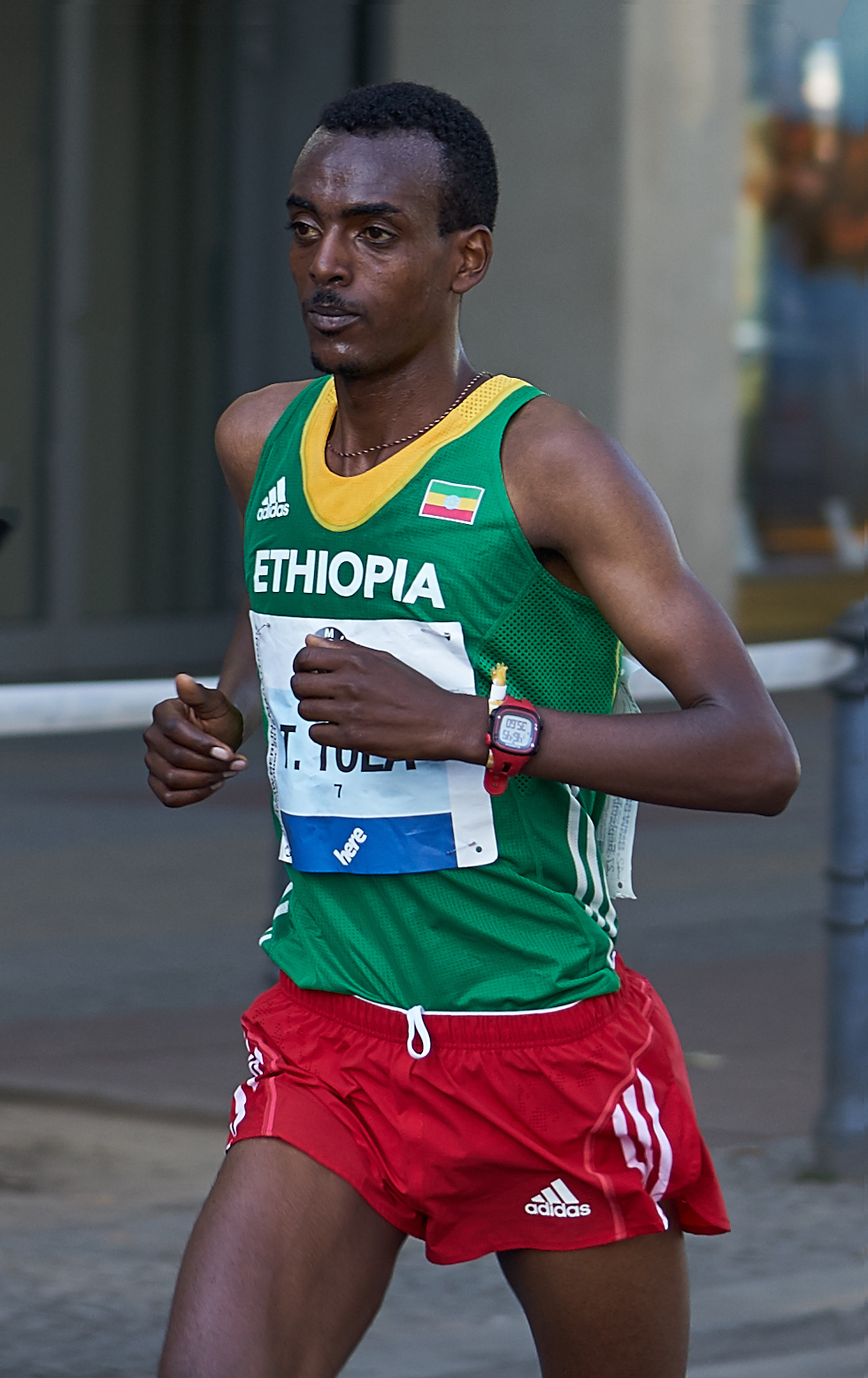
Tamirat Tola, pictured here in 2015, won the elite men's race.

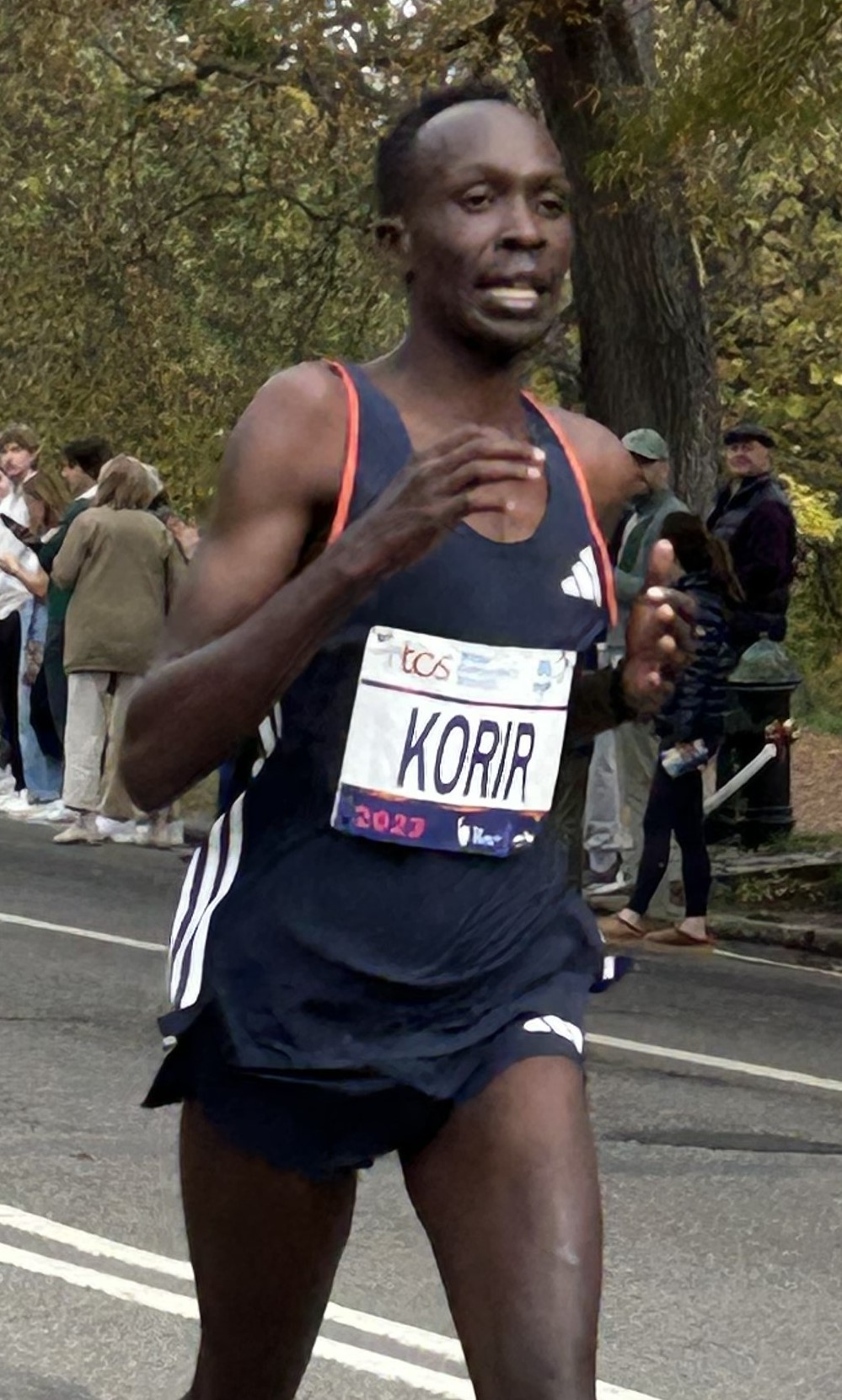
Albert Korir, pictured here near mile 24 of the 2023 New York City Marathon, came in second in the elite men's race.

Elite men's top 10 finishers
Position	Athlete	Nationality	Time
1st place, gold medalist(s)	Tamirat Tola	Ethiopia	2:04:58 CR
2nd place, silver medalist(s)	Albert Korir	Kenya	2:06:57
3rd place, bronze medalist(s)	Shura Kitata	Ethiopia	2:07:11
4	Abdi Nageeye	Netherlands	2:10:21
5	Koen Naert	Belgium	2:10:25
6	Maru Teferi	Israel	2:10:28
7	Iliass Aouani	Italy	2:10:54
8	Edward Cheserek	Kenya	2:11:07
9	Jemal Yimer Mekonnen	Ethiopia	2:11:31
10	Futsum Zienasellassie	United States	2:12:09

=== Women ===
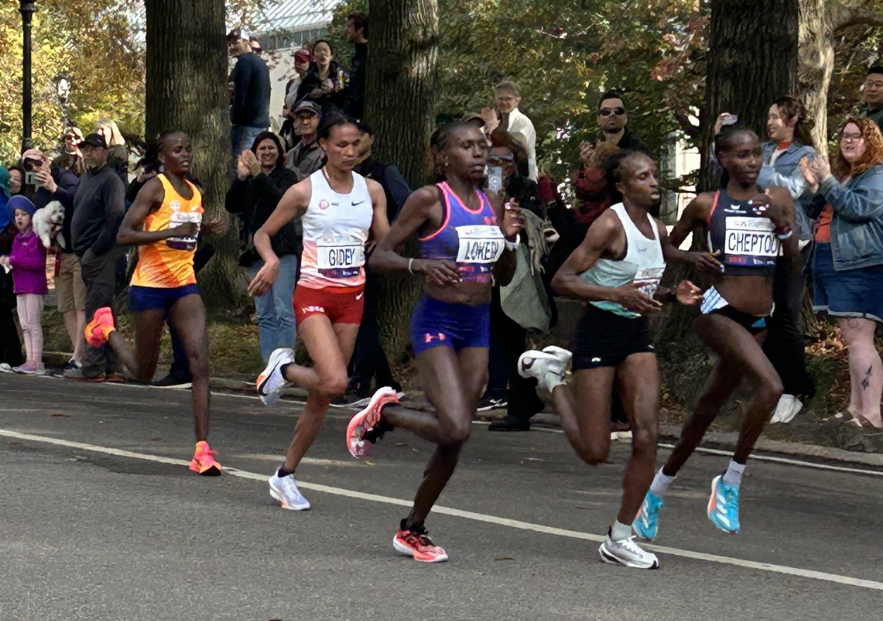
Women's lead pack at Mile 24 of the 2023 New York City Marathon, including women's winner Hellen Obiri (fourth from left) and runner up Letesenbet Gidey (second from left).

The women's race was led by a strong Kenyan contingent, with several athletes maintaining close competition throughout the course.

Elite women's top 10 finishers
Position	Athlete	Nationality	Time
1st place, gold medalist(s)	Hellen Obiri	Kenya	2:27:23
2nd place, silver medalist(s)	Letesenbet Gidey	Ethiopia	2:27:29
3rd place, bronze medalist(s)	Sharon Lokedi	Kenya	2:27:33
4	Brigid Kosgei	Kenya	2:27:45
5	Mary Ngugi	Kenya	2:27:53
6	Viola Cheptoo	Kenya	2:28:11
7	Edna Kiplagat	Kenya	2:29:40
8	Kellyn Taylor	United States	2:29:48
9	Molly Huddle	United States	2:32:02
10	Fantu Zewude Jifar	Ethiopia	2:34:10

=== Wheelchair Men ===
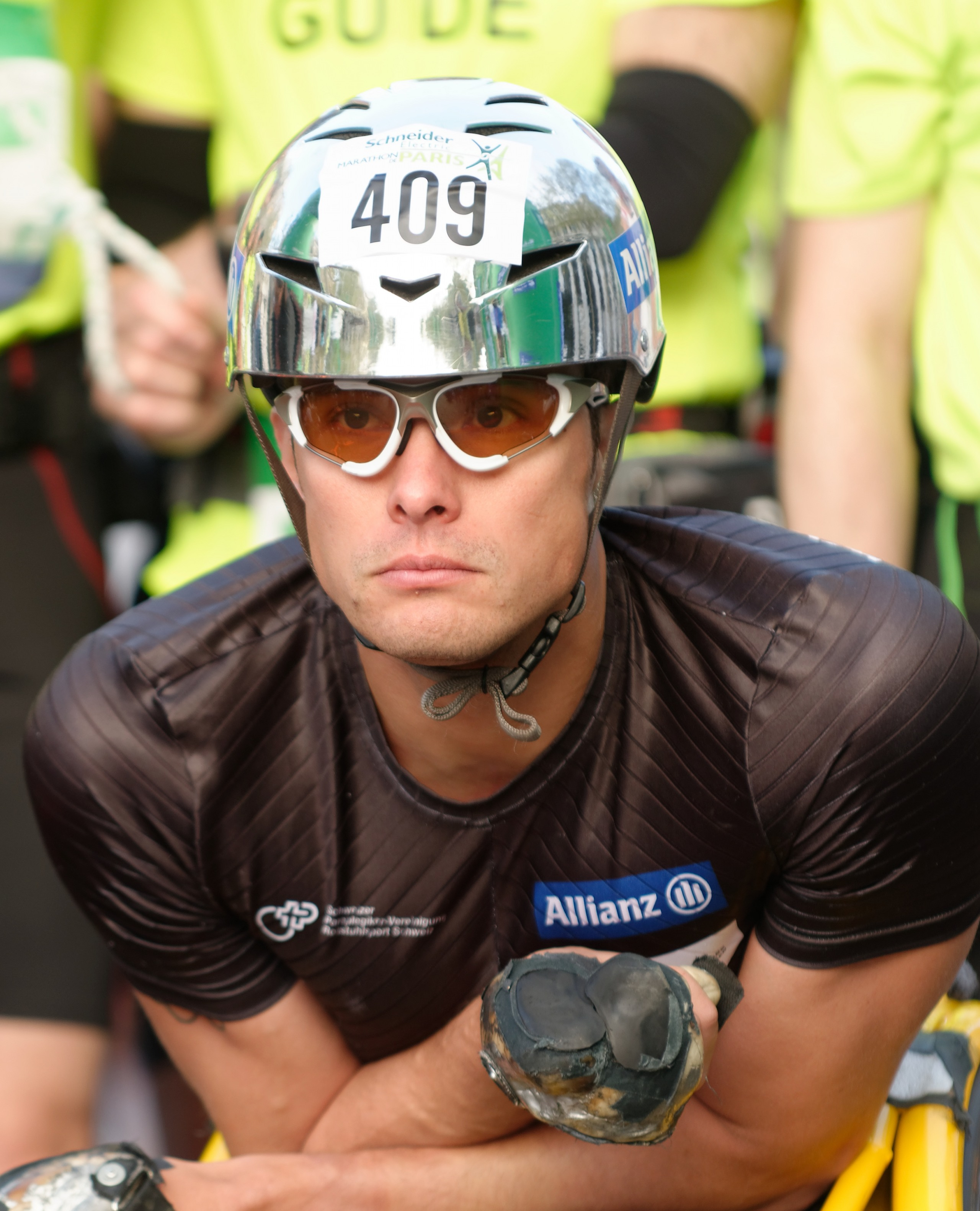
Marcel Hug, pictured here in 2014, won the men's wheelchair race.

The wheelchair races featured elite international athletes competing across the full marathon distance.

Wheelchair men's top 10 finishers
Position	Athlete	Nationality	Time
1st place, gold medalist(s)	Marcel Hug	Switzerland	1:25:29
2nd place, silver medalist(s)	Daniel Romanchuk	United States	1:30:07
3rd place, bronze medalist(s)	Jetze Plat	Netherlands	1:34:22
4	Aaron Pike	United States	1:39:58
5	Sho Watanabe	Japan	1:40:01
6	Evan Correll	United States	1:40:06
7	Johnboy Smith	United Kingdom	1:40:09
8	Patrick Monahan	Ireland	1:40:14
9	Brian Siemann	United States	1:40:23
10	Simon Lawson	United Kingdom	1:42:27

=== Wheelchair Women ===
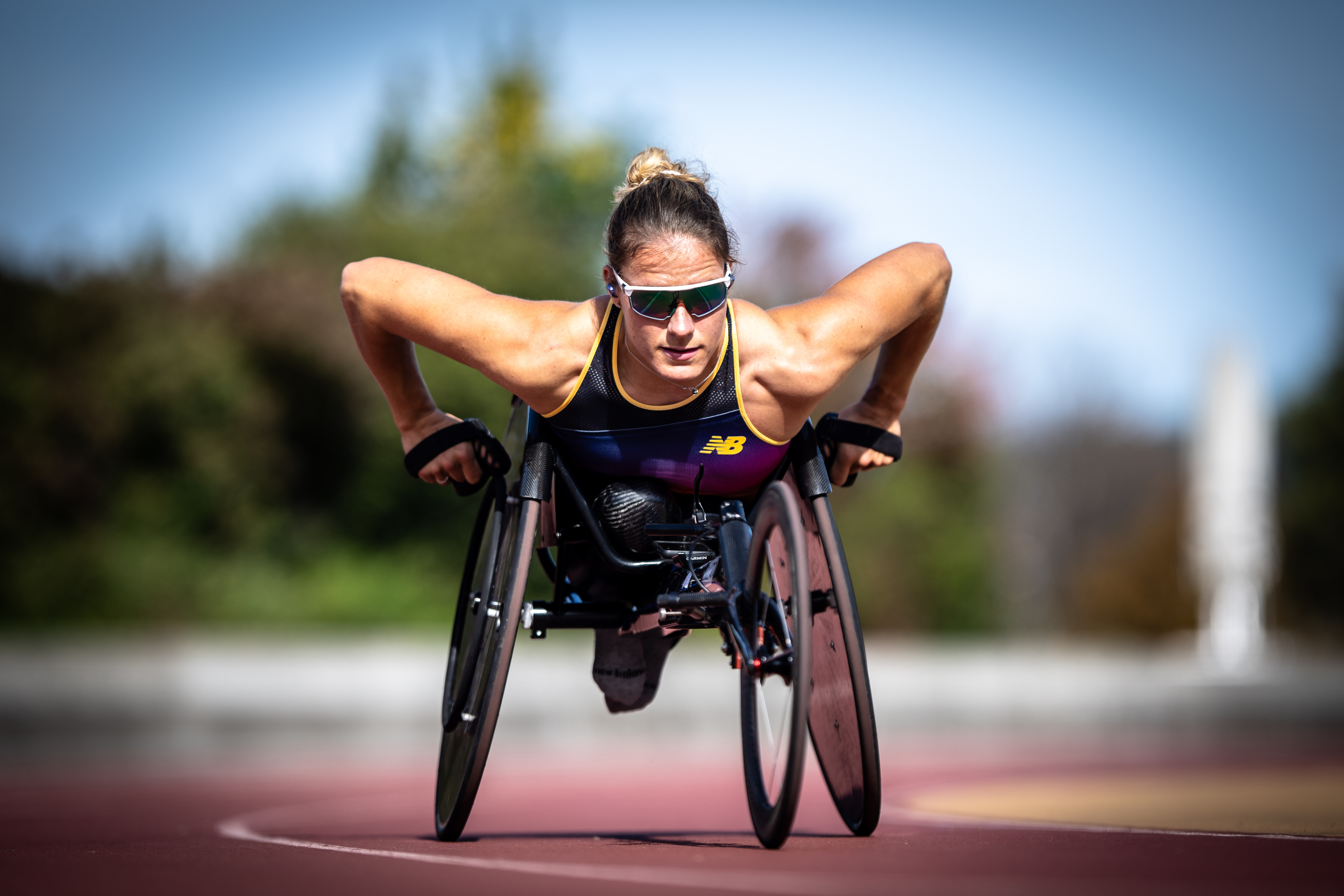
Catherine Debrunner won the women's wheelchair race.

The women's wheelchair race included elite international competitors who contested the full marathon distance.

Wheelchair women's top 10 finishers
Position	Athlete	Nationality	Time
1st place, gold medalist(s)	Catherine Debrunner	Switzerland	1:39:32 CR
2nd place, silver medalist(s)	Manuela Schar	Switzerland	1:47:54
3rd place, bronze medalist(s)	Susannah Scaroni	United States	1:48:14
4	Eden Rainbow-Cooper	United Kingdom	1:49:34
5	Aline Rocha	Brazil	1:53:25
6	Tatyana McFadden	United States	1:53:31
7	Madison de Rozario	Australia	1:53:47
8	Jenna Fesemyer	United States	1:59:19
9	Vanessa de Souza	Brazil	1:59:51
10	Christie Dawes	Australia	1:59:55
