= Yegon =

Yegon is a surname. Notable people with the surname include:

- Bethwel Yegon (born 1993), Kenyan marathon runner
- Gilbert Yegon (born 1988), Kenyan long-distance runner
