= Cosmas Muteti =

Kenyan long-distance runner

Personal information
- Nationality: Kenyan
- Born: Cosmas Matolo Muteti; 16 May 1991 (age 35) Kenya
- Occupation: long-distance runner
- Years active: 2016–present

Sport
- Country: Kenya
- Sport: Athletics
- Event(s): Marathon, Half marathon, 10,000 metres

Achievements and titles
- Personal bests: Marathon: 2:06:53 (2022); Half marathon: 1:08:19 (2016); 10,000 metres: 31:43.8h (2021)

Cosmas Muteti (born 16 May 1991), full name Cosmas Matolo Muteti, is a Kenyan long-distance runner specializing in marathon events. He has achieved victories and podium finishes in various international marathons.

== Career ==
Cosmas Muteti began his marathon career around 2017. His personal best in the half marathon is 1:08:19, set in December 2016. He also has a 10,000 metres personal best of 31:43.8h from February 2021.

Muteti's breakthrough came with his victory at the 2022 Vienna City Marathon, where he set his marathon personal best of 2:06:53. This was the second-fastest time in the event's history and marked the 50th sub-2:10 finish at the Vienna City Marathon. He chose not to run with Oqbe Kibrom Ruesom, saying "I knew he was strong. But I decided not go with him at 30k and run my own pace instead. I hoped to close the gap slowly".

In 2017, Muteti won the Kuala Lumpur Marathon (2:18:42) and the Perlis International Marathon (2:24:19).

The following year, he won the Bali Marathon with a time of 2:15:25. He won the Kilimanjaro Marathon twice, in 2018 (2:17:00) and 2019 (2:18:16).

Muteti recorded a 5th-place finish at the 2021 Berlin Marathon with a time of 2:08:45, a personal best at the time. He finished 2nd at the 2022 Sydney Marathon, clocking 2:07:05.

Muteti was 5th at the Marathon de Paris in 2024 with 2:07:37.

Muteti is coached by former marathon world record holder Patrick Makau.

== Achievements ==
| Year | Race | City | Position | Time |
|---|---|---|---|---|
| 2017 | Standard Chartered Kuala Lumpur Marathon | Kuala Lumpur | 1st | 2:18:42 |
| 2018 | Singapore Marathon | Singapore | 4th | 2:15:42 |
| 2018 | Kilimanjaro Marathon | Moshi | 1st | 2:17:00 |
| 2018 | Maybank Bali Marathon | Bali | 1st | 2:15:25 |
| 2019 | Kilimanjaro Marathon | Moshi | 1st | 2:18:16 |
| 2021 | Berlin Marathon | Berlin | 5th | 2:08:45 |
| 2022 | Vienna City Marathon | Vienna | 1st | 2:06:53 (PB) |
| 2022 | Blackmores Sydney Marathon | Sydney | 2nd | 2:07:05 |
| 2024 | Schneider Electric Marathon de Paris | Paris | 5th | 2:07:37 |
