= 2022 New York City Marathon =

51st running of the marathon

51st New York City Marathon
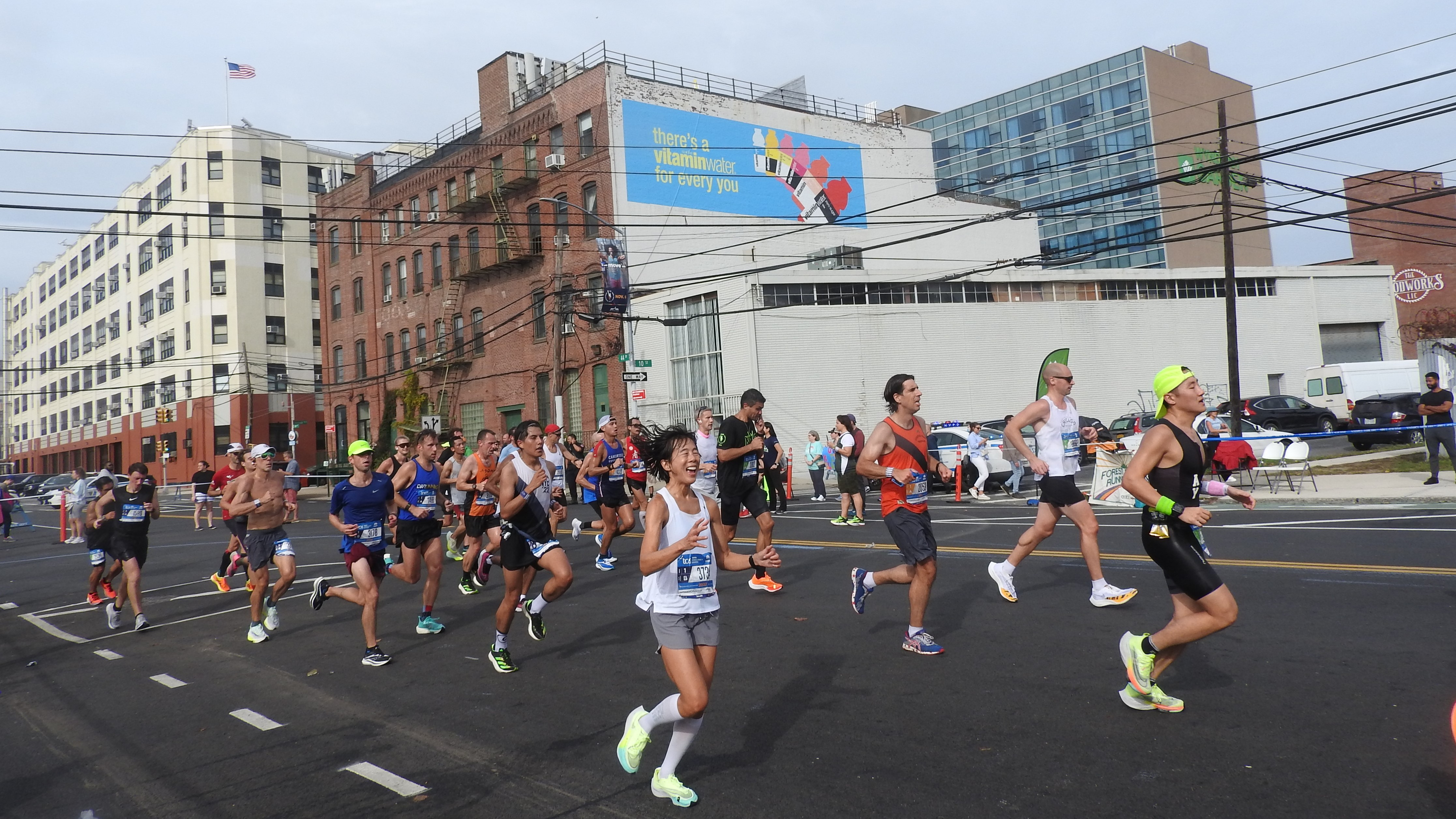
- Runners in Queens
- Location: New York City, United States
- Date: November 6, 2022
- Competitors: 47,839

Champions
- Men: Evans Chebet (2:08:41)
- Women: Sharon Lokedi (2:23:23)
- Wheelchair men: Marcel Hug (1:25:26)
- Wheelchair women: Susannah Scaroni (1:42:43)

The 2022 New York City Marathon, the 51st running of that city's premier long-distance race, was held on November 6, 2022. The race followed its traditional route, which passes through all five boroughs of New York City. 47,839 people finished the event. It was the warmest New York City Marathon on record, with peak temperatures of 75 °F (24 °C).

The elite races were won by Evans Chebet and Sharon Lokedi, both from Kenya, in 2:08:41 and 2:23:23 respectively. The wheelchair competitions were won by Marcel Hug of Switzerland and Susannah Scaroni of the United States, in course record times of 1:25:26 and 1:42:43 respectively.

== Background ==
After the 2021 event was limited to 33,000 competitors due to the COVID-19 pandemic, the 2022 edition was expected to have up to 50,000 competitors. All competitors were required to wear face coverings in the race start area. The 2022 New York City Marathon was sponsored by Indian company Tata Consultancy Services.

The prize money for the winners of the elite men and women's event was $100,000. The winners of the wheelchair races received $25,000 each, and there were prizes of $50,000 for breaking the course record. The total prize fund was $870,000. For the first time, the event awarded prize money for non-binary athletes, with a top prize of $5,000 for the fastest non-binary finisher. The prize money for the non-binary category was awarded by New York Road Runners, whereas the World Marathon Majors awarded prize money for athletes in the male and female gender categories.

=== Course ===
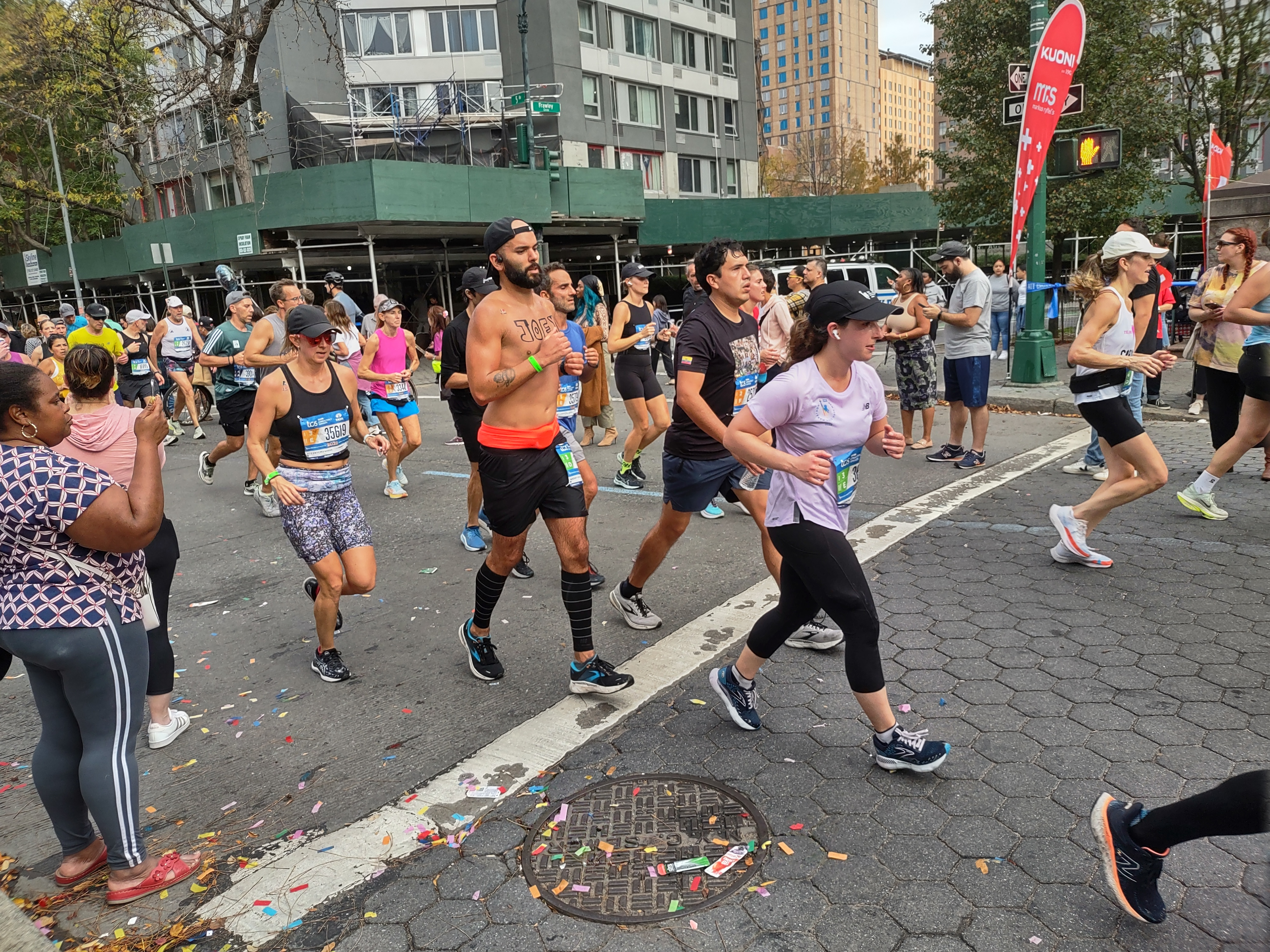
Runners in Harlem.

The marathon distance is 42.195 kilometres (26.219 mi) long as sanctioned by World Athletics. The New York City Marathon starts at Fort Wadsworth on Staten Island. The runners cross the Verrazzano–Narrows Bridge into mostly-flat Brooklyn where for the next 12 miles (19.3 km) they pass through Bay Ridge, Sunset Park, Park Slope, Fort Greene, Bedford-Stuyvesant, and Williamsburg. The course then enters Queens by crossing over the Pulaski Bridge; the mid-point of the race is on that bridge.

After a short time in Queens, the race crosses the Queensboro Bridge at mile 14 (22.5 km), and enters Manhattan where competitors run north on First Avenue for 3 miles (4.8 km). The runners cross the Willis Avenue Bridge, where they enter The Bronx for 2 miles (3.2 km) from mile 19 (30.6 km). The course then re-enters Manhattan via the Madison Avenue Bridge for the final 6.2 miles (10.0 km). After running through Harlem, there is a slight uphill section along Fifth Avenue before it flattens out and runs parallel to Central Park. The course then enters the park around mile 24 (38.6 km), passes Columbus Circle at mile 25 (40.2 km) and re-enters the park for the finish.

== Field ==
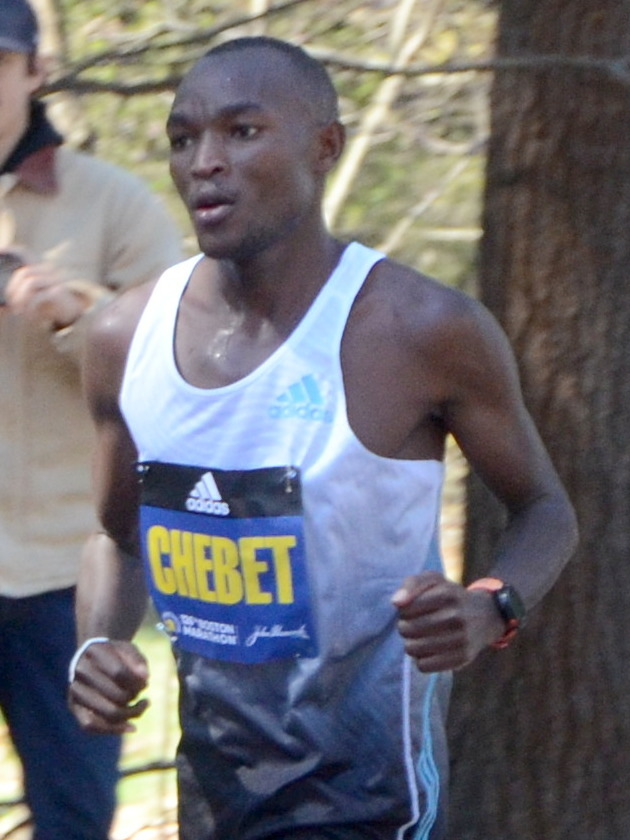
Evans Chebet, pictured here at the 2022 Boston Marathon, won the elite men's race.

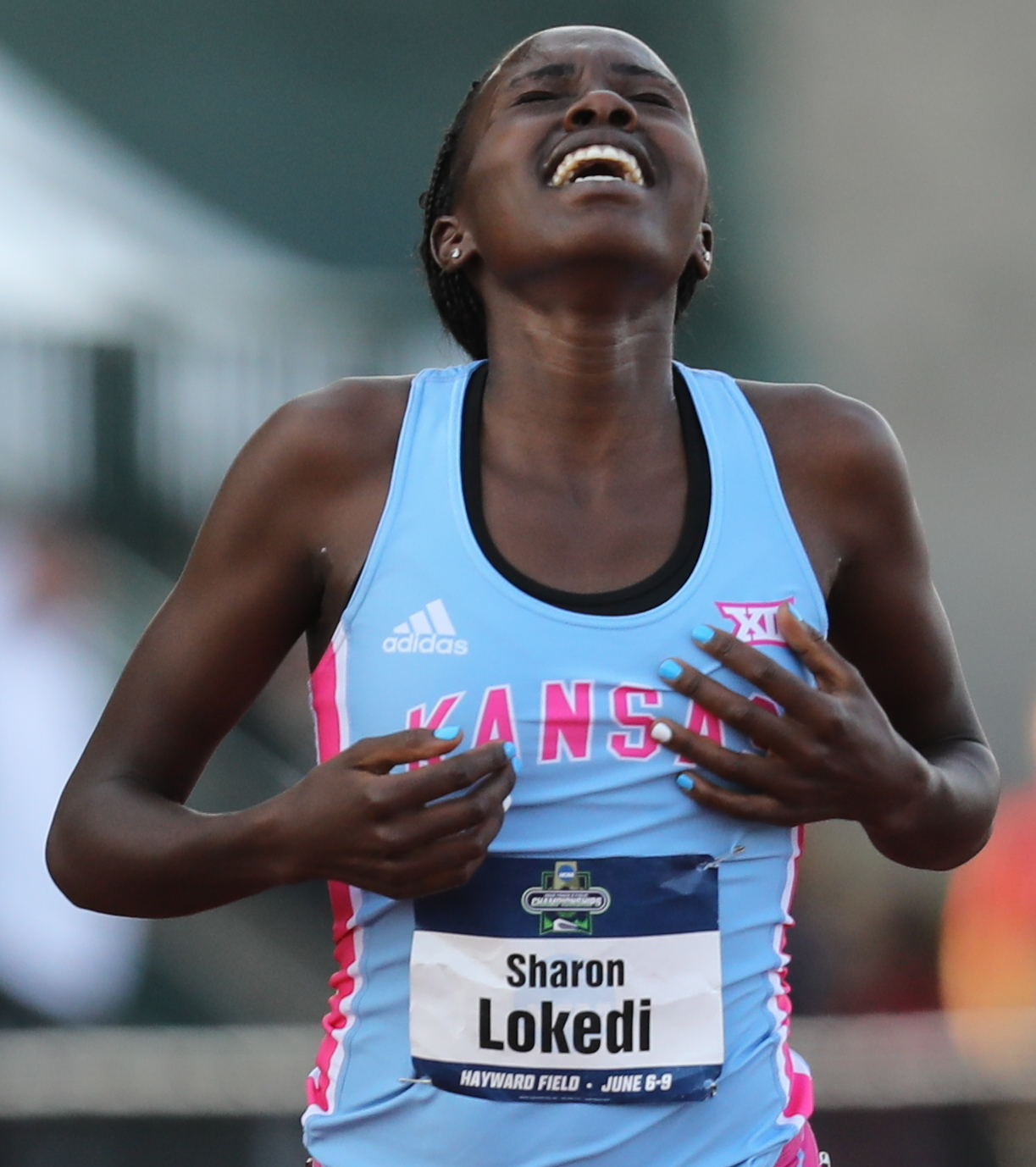
Sharon Lokedi, pictured here in 2018, won the elite women's competition.

The elite men's competition featured 2021 winner Albert Korir, although over 10 athletes at the event had a faster personal best time than Korir. Other favorites included Evans Chebet, who won the 2022 Boston Marathon and had the fastest personal best time of any competitor at this event, Abdi Nageeye, who came second in the marathon event at the 2020 Summer Olympics and was the Dutch record holder, and Shura Kitata, who won the 2020 London Marathon. South American record holder Daniel Ferreira do Nascimento also competed. American athletes in the event included 36-year old Galen Rupp in his final marathon event, Jared Ward, Scott Fauble and Leonard Korir. Elkanah Kibet, the best finishing American at the 2021 event, withdrew after being called up by the US Army to serve abroad.

The elite women's event featured Gotytom Gebreslase, who won the marathon event at the 2022 World Athletics Championships and the 2021 Berlin Marathon. Other competitors included Lonah Chemtai Salpeter, who won a medal at the 2022 World Championships, Edna Kiplagat, a former double World Champion, Senbere Teferi and Jess Piasecki. Hellen Obiri made her marathon debut at this race. She had previously won World Championship medals in the 5,000 and 10,000 meters events. Americans in the race included Aliphine Tuliamuk, who won the US trial event prior to the 2020 Summer Olympics, Sara Hall, Emma Bates and Keira D'Amato. Peres Jepchirchir, who won the 2021 race, was originally scheduled to compete, but withdrew in October 2022.

The men's wheelchair event featured 2021 winner Marcel Hug, as well as Daniel Romanchuk, who won the 2018 and 2019 races. Other competitors included twice former winner Ernst van Dyk, Aaron Pike, who came second at the 2022 Boston Marathon, Johnboy Smith, who came second at the 2017 New York City Marathon and American Hermin Garic.

The women's wheelchair race featured 2021 winner Madison de Rozario, who also won the marathon event at the 2022 Commonwealth Games. Other competitors included five-time former winner Tatyana McFadden, three-time champion Manuela Schär and American Susannah Scaroni.

== Race summary ==
The wheelchair races commenced at 08:00 EST (13:00 UTC), the handcycle event started at 08:22 EST, the elite women's race began at 08:40 EST and the elite men's competition commenced at 09:05 EST. The events took place in record warm temperatures, as the high in New York City set a daily record at 75 °F (24 °C). The temperatures inhibited fast times in the elite races.

The elite men's event was won by Kenyan Evans Chebet, in his first New York City Marathon. He was the first man since 2013 to win the New York City and Boston Marathons in the same year, and his victory also meant that Kenyan men had won all of the six World Marathon Majors in 2022. Brazilian Daniel do Nascimento led for much of the race, and at the halfway point, he had a lead of over two minutes on the chasing group. Chebet broke away from the chasing group as the race first entered into Manhattan. After 18 miles (29 km), do Nascimento had to take an unscheduled toilet break, and he collapsed after 20 miles (32 km), requiring medical attention. In the aftermath of do Nascimento's collapse, the lead vehicle almost crashed into Evans Chebet as he was overtaking do Nascimento. Chebet finished in a time of 2:08:41, which was a few seconds ahead of Shura Kitata, who finished second. Dutchman Abdi Nageeye finished third overall, whilst 2021 winner Albert Korir was seventh. Scott Fauble was the best finishing American athlete in ninth place overall; Galen Rupp had been ahead of Fauble, but dropped out after 30 kilometres (19 mi).

The elite women's event was won by marathon debutante Sharon Lokedi in a time of 2:23:23. After 16 miles (26 km), Gotytom Gebreslase, Viola Cheptoo and Hellen Obiri broke away from the main field, but were caught by Lokedi and Lonah Chemtai Salpeter after 21 miles (34 km). As the race entered Central Park, Lokedi, Salpeter and Gebreslase were leading the race, and Lokedi took the lead in the final 1 mile (1.6 km) of the race, finishing seven seconds ahead of Salpeter. Gebreslase finished third overall. Lokedi was an unexpected race winner, and after the race, it was revealed that due to her low profile, she had not been on the Athletics Integrity Unit's list of athletes who had to take drug tests before competing. Lokedi did take a drug test after her victory. The highest placed American was seventh-placed Aliphine Tuliamuk, who was one place ahead of Emma Bates.

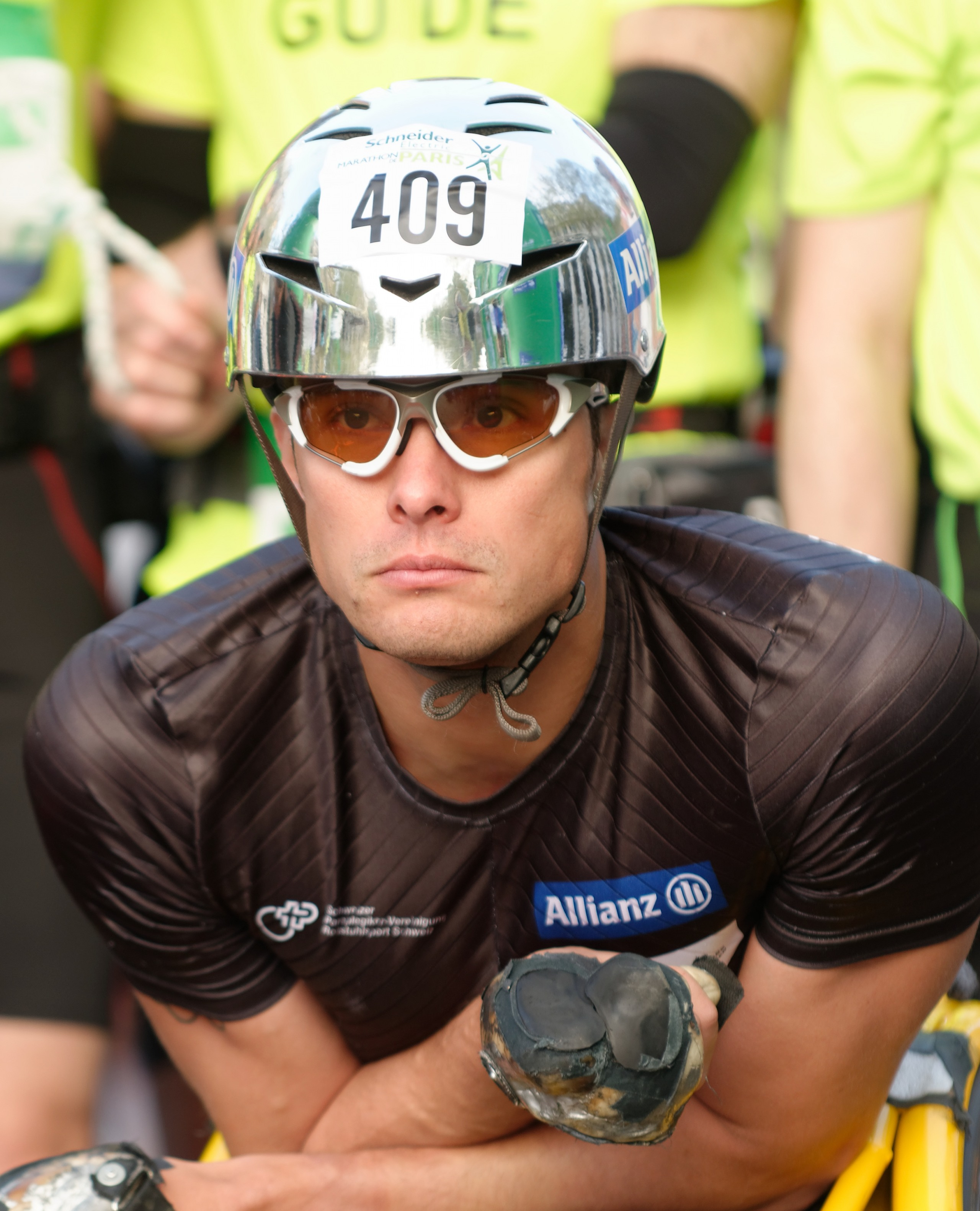
Marcel Hug, pictured here in 2014, won the men's wheelchair race.

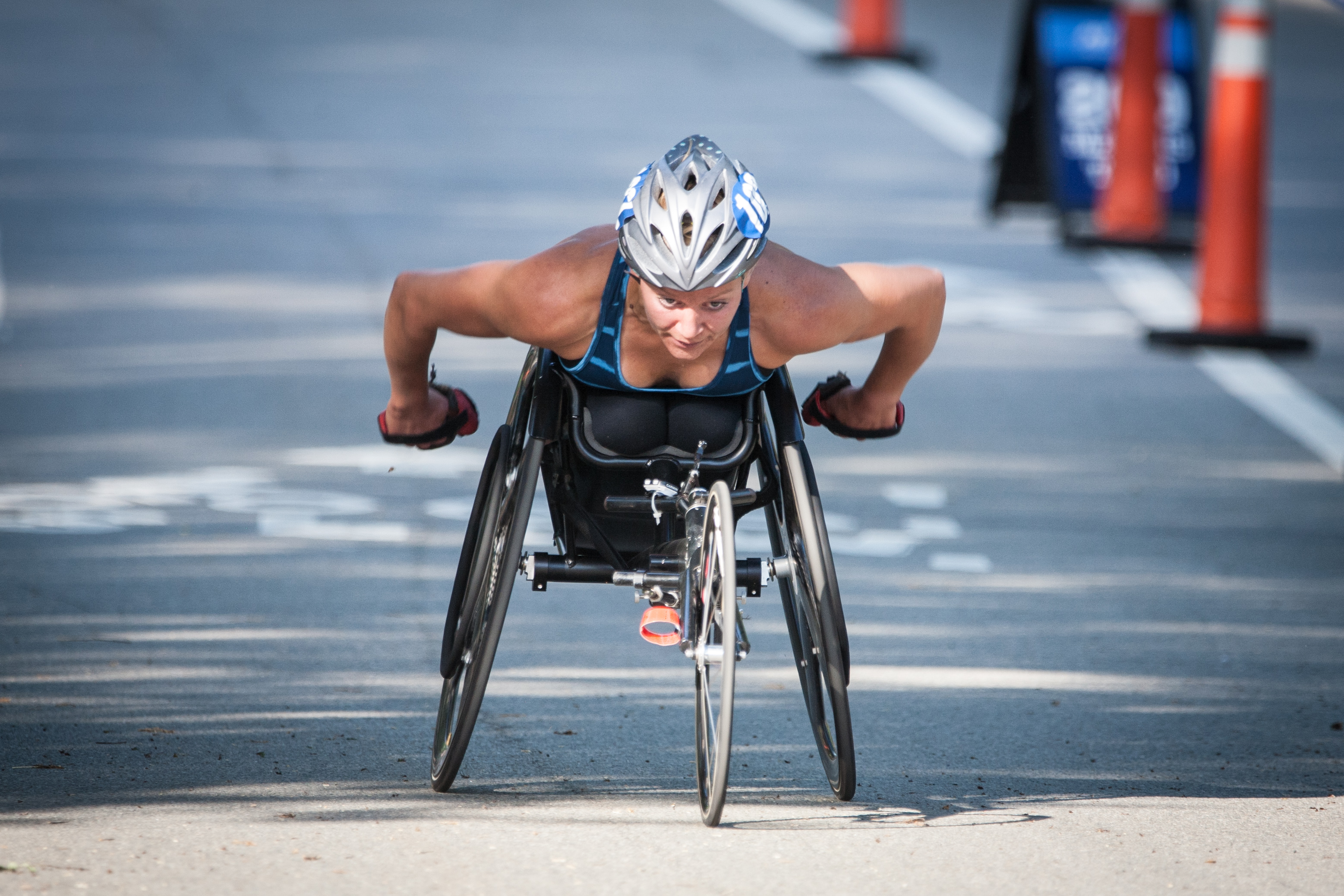
Susannah Scaroni, pictured here in 2018, won the women's wheelchair competition.

The men's wheelchair competition was won by Marcel Hug of Switzerland in a course record time of 1:25:26, nearly four minutes faster than Kurt Fearnley's previous record which had been set in 2006. Hug took the lead on the exit of the Verrazzano–Narrows Bridge, and at the halfway point, he had a lead of 79 seconds over second-placed Daniel Romanchuk. Hug finished over two minutes ahead of Romanchuk, who came second, with Jetze Plat third. It was Hug's fifth New York City Marathon victory, tying him for most wins with Fearnley and Tatyana McFadden. Hug received $50,000 for breaking the course record, and confirmed his World Marathon Majors title with the win. Hug had won five of the six World Marathon Majors in 2022, three of them in course record times.

The women's wheelchair event was won by American Susannah Scaroni in a course record time of 1:42:43; her time was 21 seconds better than the previous record, which had been set by Tatyana McFadden in 2015. It was Scaroni's first New York City Marathon victory. Scaroni took the lead within the first 5 kilometres (3.1 mi) of the race, and had a lead of 2 minutes 44 seconds at halfway. Manuela Schär finished two and a half minutes behind in second and Madison de Rozario was third overall.

=== Non-elite race ===
The mass participation event began in five waves between 09:10 and 11:30 EST. In total, there were 47,839 finishers, of whom 26,608 were male, 21,186 were female and 45 were non-binary. New York City resident Jacob Caswell was the fastest non-binary finisher. They were also the second fastest non-binary finisher in 2021, though no prize money was awarded that year in the non-binary division.

Sportspeople who raced included Norwegian cross-country skier Marit Bjørgen, Olympic ice hockey gold medalist Meghan Duggan, former tennis player Monica Puig, IndyCar driver Ryan Briscoe, former American footballer Tiki Barber, 800 meters runner Alysia Montaño and sportscaster Nicole Briscoe. Non-sporting celebrities who competed included actors Ashton Kutcher, Claire Holt, Lauren Ridloff, Ellie Kemper and Sierra Boggess, Chelsea Clinton, the daughter of former US President Bill Clinton, TV presenters Amy Robach and Nev Schulman, YouTuber Casey Neistat, television journalist Ana Cabrera, television personality Matt James and Oz Pearlman, who finished third in season 10 of America's Got Talent.

== Results ==
=== Men ===
Elite men's top 10 finishers
Position	Athlete	Nationality	Time
1st place, gold medalist(s)	Evans Chebet	Kenya	2:08:41
2nd place, silver medalist(s)	Shura Kitata	Ethiopia	2:08:54
3rd place, bronze medalist(s)	Abdi Nageeye	Netherlands	2:10:31
4	Mohamed Reda El Aaraby	Morocco	2:11:00
5	Suguru Osako	Japan	2:11:31
6	Tetsuya Yoroizaka	Japan	2:12:12
7	Albert Korir	Kenya	2:13:27
8	Daniele Meucci	Italy	2:13:29
9	Scott Fauble	United States	2:13:35
10	Reed Fischer	United States	2:15:23

=== Women ===
Elite women's top 10 finishers
Position	Athlete	Nationality	Time
1st place, gold medalist(s)	Sharon Lokedi	Kenya	2:23:23
2nd place, silver medalist(s)	Lonah Chemtai Salpeter	Israel	2:23:30
3rd place, bronze medalist(s)	Gotytom Gebreslase	Ethiopia	2:23:39
4	Edna Kiplagat	Kenya	2:24:16
5	Viola Cheptoo Lagat	Kenya	2:25:34
6	Hellen Obiri	Kenya	2:25:49
7	Aliphine Tuliamuk	United States	2:26:18
8	Emma Bates	United States	2:26:53
9	Jessica Stenson	Australia	2:27:27
10	Nell Rojas	United States	2:28:32

=== Wheelchair men ===
Wheelchair men's top 10 finishers
Position	Athlete	Nationality	Time
1st place, gold medalist(s)	Marcel Hug	Switzerland	1:25:26
2nd place, silver medalist(s)	Daniel Romanchuk	United States	1:27:38
3rd place, bronze medalist(s)	Jetze Plat	Netherlands	1:31:28
4	Evan Correll	United States	1:37:01
5	Aaron Pike	United States	1:38:07
6	Sho Watanabe	Japan	1:39:20
7	Simon Lawson	United Kingdom	1:39:38
8	Patrick Monahan	Ireland	1:40:52
9	Ernst van Dyk	South Africa	1:41:24
10	Krige Schabort	United States	1:41:26

=== Wheelchair women ===
Wheelchair women's top 10 finishers
Position	Athlete	Nationality	Time
1st place, gold medalist(s)	Susannah Scaroni	United States	1:42:43
2nd place, silver medalist(s)	Manuela Schär	Switzerland	1:45:11
3rd place, bronze medalist(s)	Madison de Rozario	Australia	1:45:24
4	Yen Hoang	United States	1:48:30
5	Jenna Fesemyer	United States	1:51:38
6	Christie Dawes	Australia	1:51:40
7	Vanessa Cristina de Souza	Brazil	1:51:45
8	Tatyana McFadden	United States	1:52:59
9	Merle Menje	Germany	1:54:49
10	Patricia Eachus	Switzerland	1:54:53

=== Handcycle men ===
Handcycle men's top 3 finishers
Position	Athlete	Nationality	Time
1st place, gold medalist(s)	Fabio Faborges	Brazil	1:35:09
2nd place, silver medalist(s)	Edson Rocha Nascimento	Brazil	1:35:12
3rd place, bronze medalist(s)	Jose Alejandro Parra Sanchez	Colombia	1:35:19

=== Handcycle women ===
Handcycle women's top 3 finishers
Position	Athlete	Nationality	Time
1st place, gold medalist(s)	Wendy Larsen	United States	1:37:55
2nd place, silver medalist(s)	Devann Murphy	United States	1:54:28
3rd place, bronze medalist(s)	Jessica Hayon	United States	2:10:19
