= 2012 African Championships in Athletics – Women's 5000 metres =

The women's 5000 metres at the 2012 African Championships in Athletics was held at the Stade Charles de Gaulle on 28 June.

== Medalists ==
Gold	Gladys Cherono; Kenya
Silver	Veronica Nyaruai; Kenya
Bronze	Gotytom Gebreslase; Ethiopia

== Records ==
Standing records prior to the 2012 African Championships in Athletics
World record	Tirunesh Dibaba (ETH)	14:11.15	Oslo, Norway	6 June 2008
African record	Tirunesh Dibaba (ETH)	14:11.15	Oslo, Norway	6 June 2008
Championship record	Asmae Leghzaoui (MAR)	15:43.46	Algiers, Algeria	2000
Broken records during the 2012 African Championships in Athletics
Championship record	Gladys Cherono (KEN)	15:40.04	Porto-Novo, Benin	28 June 2012

== Schedule ==
Date	Time	Round
28 June 2012	16:30	Final

== Results ==
=== Final ===
Rank	Name	Nationality	Time	Note
1st place, gold medalist(s)	Gladys Cherono	Kenya	15:40.04	CR
2nd place, silver medalist(s)	Veronica Nyaruai	Kenya	15:40.65	
3rd place, bronze medalist(s)	Gotytom Gebreslase	Ethiopia	15:53.34	
4	Alemitu Heroya	Ethiopia	15:55.36	
5	Shito Wudessa	Ethiopia	16:14.49	
6	Viola Chemos	Uganda	16:16.21	
7	Abla Doki Atchade	Togo	18:02.34	
8	Balkissa Abdoulaye Kirbo	Niger	18:17.72	
	Bakit Amina	Sudan	DNF	
	Samrawit Mengisteab	Eritrea	DNS	
	Mammie Konneh	Sierra Leone	DNS	
	Jackline Sakilu	Tanzania	DNS	
