= Athletics at the 2011 All-Africa Games – Women's 5000 metres =

The Women's 5000 metres at the 2011 All-Africa Games took place on 11 September at the Beijing National Stadium.

== Medalists ==
Gold	Sule Utura (ETH)
Silver	Emebet Anteneh Mengistu (ETH)
Bronze	Pauline Korikwiang (KEN)

== Records ==
Prior to this competition, the existing World, African record and World leading were as follows:

World record	Tirunesh Dibaba (ETH)	14:11.15	Oslo, Norway	6 June 2008
World leading	Vivian Cheruiyot (KEN)	14:20.87	Stockholm, Sweden	29 July 2011
African record	Tirunesh Dibaba (ETH)	14:11.15	Oslo, Norway	6 June 2008

== Results ==
=== Final ===
Rank	Name	Nationality	Time	Notes
1st place, gold medalist(s)	Sule Utura	Ethiopia	15:38.70	
2nd place, silver medalist(s)	Emebet Anteneh Mengistu	Ethiopia	15:40.13	
3rd place, bronze medalist(s)	Pauline Korikwiang	Kenya	15:40.93	
4	Hyvin Jepkemoi	Kenya	15:42.64	
5	Esther Ndiema	Kenya	15:43.48	
6	Gotytom Gebreslase	Ethiopia	15:49.90	
7	Angeline Nyiransabimana	Rwanda	16:24.04	
8	Mekdes Weldu	Eritrea	16:42.69	
9	Thandiwe Nyathy	Zimbabwe	17:13.00	
