= Sharon Lokedi =

Kenyan runner (born 1994)

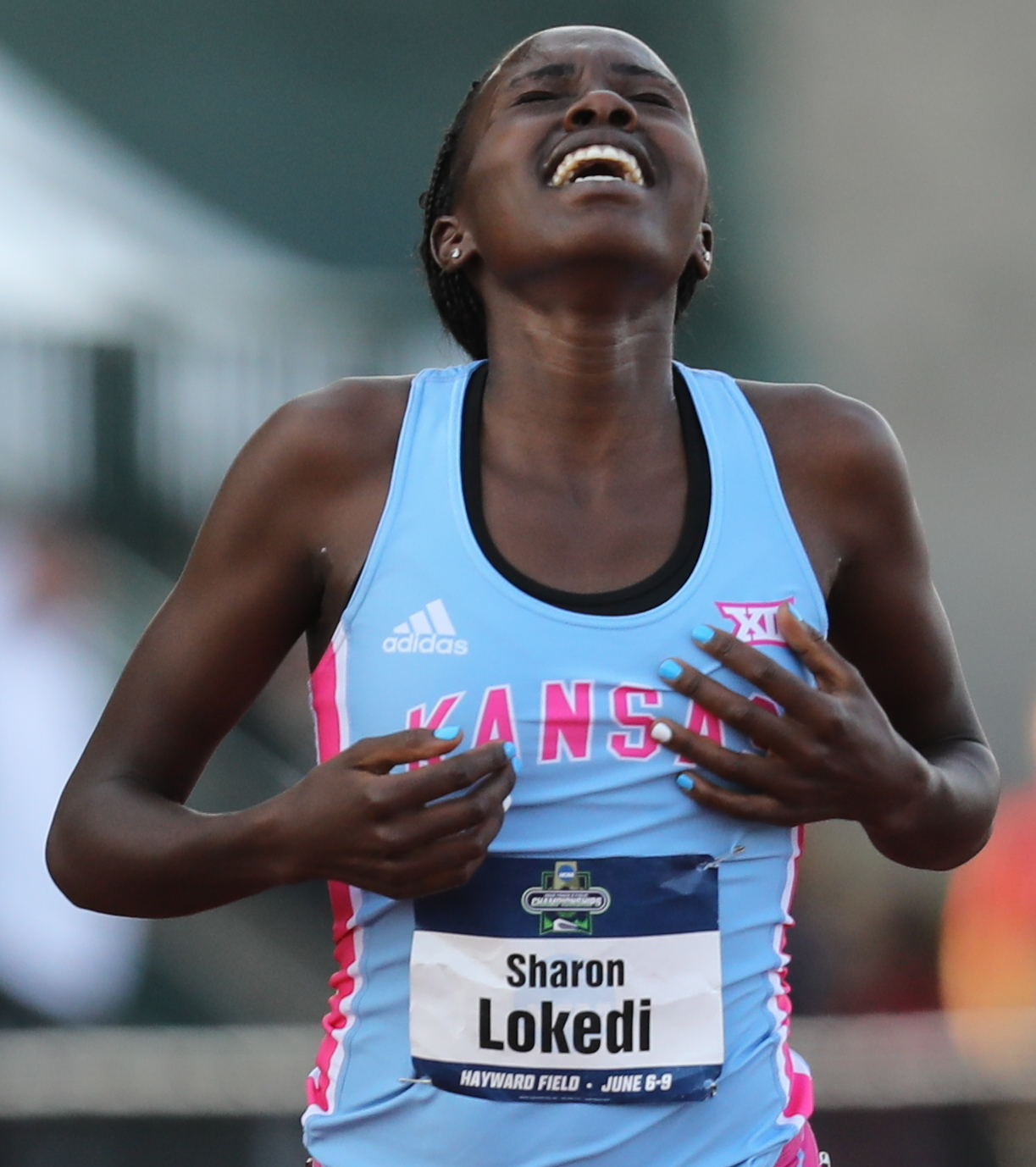
- Lokedi winning the 10,000 m at the 2018 NCAA Division I Outdoor Track and Field Championships

Personal information
- Nationality: Kenyan
- Born: March 10, 1994 (age 32) Burnt Forest, Kenya
- Employer: Under Armour
- Height: 5 ft 6 in (168 cm)

Sport
- Country: Kenya
- Sport: Track and field
- Events: Middle-, long-distance running; Cross country
- College team: Kansas
- Club: Dark Sky Distance
Medal record
Women's athletics
Representing Kenya
World Marathon Majors
Gold medal – first place	2022 New York	Marathon
Gold medal – first place	2025 Boston	Marathon
Gold medal – first place	2026 Boston	Marathon
Silver medal – second place	2024 Boston	Marathon
Silver medal – second place	2025 New York	Marathon
Silver medal – second place	2026 Chicago	Marathon
Bronze medal – third place	2023 New York	Marathon

Sharon Lokedi (born March 10, 1994) is a Kenyan middle and long-distance runner. She won the 10,000 meters at the 2018 NCAA Division I Outdoor Track and Field Championships. Lokedi has been a 10-time All-American and 12-time Big 12 champion, as of March 2019. In 2022, on her marathon debut, she won the New York City Marathon.

Lokedi was recruited to the University of Kansas (KU) where she has studied nursing and business. She began competing first in collegiate track and cross country in 2015.

== Early life ==
Sharon is the daughter of Jonathan and Rose Lokedi. She has three younger siblings.

== High school ==
At the Kapkenda Girls’ School she won four letters in track. She is the school record holder in the 3000-meter and 5000-meter races. In 2013, she was named the school's "Best Athlete of the Year."

== University of Kansas ==
As a freshman in 2015, she finished sixth in her first collegiate race, clocking 10:06.11 for the 3000 m at the indoors Husker Invitational. She improved that time for 3,000 m at the Big 12 Championship finishing 15th in 9:48.10, which made her the No. 8 KU performer ever. In the same meet, she took 13th in the 5000 meters in 17:31.38. She led her team in all of the five 2015 races in which she ran, and became the second All-American in KU program history as a result of finishing 10th in the 2015 NCAA Cross Country Championships with a 6K time of 20:04.9 and finished third at the NCAA Midwest Regional Championships, in 20:14.9. She took 11th in 21:09.5 at the Big 12 Championship and ran 20:08.3 and 4th at the Pre-National Invitational.

In 2016, at the NCAA Indoors, she finished sixth in the 5000 m in 15:58.61 and won the Big 12 3000 meter Indoor Championship, adding a fifth place in the 3000 m with another PR, 9:26.89. She finished third in the Iowa State Classic 5000 m with a PR 15:57.95. At the KU/Kansas State/Wichita State Triangular a 4:56.39 earned her a win. Outdoors she took sixth in the 10,000 m at the 2016 NCAA Outdoor Championships with another PR of 32:49.43 and won the 10,000 m in 34:59.58 at the Big 12 Outdoor Championship, taking seventh as well in the 5000 m at 15:47.97. She finished 14th in the 10,000 m at the Stanford Invitational in 33:10.06. Her fifth place, 19:52.2 at the 2016 NCAA Cross Country Championships came as still another PR.

Sharon redshirted her 2017 indoor season for medical reasons. In the 2017 NCAA outdoor 10K, she finished third and also was third in the 2018 NCAA indoor 5K. She set the Kansas school record in the 10,000 m at the 2017 NCAA Outdoor Championship, finishing third in 32:46.10 to earn All-America honors after winning Big 12 titles in the 10,000 and 5,000 meters. She set another school record finishing second in the 5000-meter run in 16:00.6 at the Stanford Cardinal Classic. She lowered that record at the Stumptown Twilight meet with a 15:44.51. Her 4:29.88 won the 1500-meter run at the Rock Chalk Classic.

She was named the Big 12 Women's Cross Country Runner of the Year for the second consecutive season. She became just the fourth female in Big 12 history to win multiple individual conference titles with her first-place finish, running 20:00.5 at the Big 12 Championship. She was the runner-up in the NCAA Midwest Regional (11/10) with a time of 20:12 and placed 44th at the NCAA Championships in 20:15.14.

In 2018, Sharon lowered her KU school record in the 5000 m with an indoor time of 15:39.05, and set an indoor PR when winning the Mark Colligan Memorial mile in 4:45.84, then ran 4:45.56 to win the Rod McCravy Memorial mile. Her 8:59.69 became the school record holder in the 3,000-meter run at the Iowa State University Classic. She won the 5000 m and 3000 m crowns at the Big 12 Indoor Championship running 16:26.57 and 9:19.97, respectively. In the NCAA Indoor Championships she finished third in the 5000 m with a 15:52.95, and combined with her sixth in the 3000 m in 9:03.68 she secured two First Team All-America recognitions. In the Stanford Invitational her 32:21.19 had her finishing fifth and later, she PR'd at 1500 m at the National Relay Championships in 4:25.94. On the last lap of the 2018 NCAA Division I Outdoor Track and Field Championships 10,000 m, Lokedi stormed past pre-race favorite and six-time NCAA titlist Karissa Schweizer. Lokedi ran 32:09.20 to win, beating third-place Schweizer by 5.74 seconds, 18 seconds under the existing meet record, set by Sylvia Mosqueda thirty years earlier.

Lokedi ran 15:15.47 in a December 2018 Boston Sharon Colyear-Danville Season Opener to earn the 2019 World Championships 5000 m entry standard, No. 6 best time in NCAA History (on a 200-meter track) and indoor school record. At the 2019 Big 12 Conference indoor track and field championship, Lokedi won both 5000 m in 16:11.50 and 3000 m in 9:20.71. At the 2019 NCAA Division I Indoor Track and Field Championships, Lokedi raced the 5000 m and placed 11th in 16:06.21.

Year	Competition	Venue	Position	Event	Notes
2015	NCAA Women's Division I Cross Country Championship	Louisville, Kentucky	10th	cross country	20:14.9
2016	NCAA Women's Division I Indoor Track and Field Championships	Birmingham, Alabama	6th	5000 m	15:58.61
2016	NCAA Women's Division I Outdoor Track and Field Championships	Eugene, Oregon	6th	10,000 m	32:49.43
2016	NCAA Women's Division I Cross Country Championship	Terre Haute, Indiana	5th	cross country	19:52.2
2017	NCAA Women's Division I Outdoor Track and Field Championships	Eugene, Oregon	3rd	10,000 m	32:46.10
2018	NCAA Women's Division I Indoor Track and Field Championships	College Station, Texas	6th	3000 m	9:03.08
2018	NCAA Women's Division I Indoor Track and Field Championships	College Station, Texas	3rd	5000 m	15:52.95
2018	NCAA Women's Division I Outdoor Track and Field Championships	Eugene, Oregon	1st	10,000 m	32:09.94
2018	NCAA Women's Division I Outdoor Track and Field Championships	Eugene, Oregon	12th	5000 m	15:51.29
2019	2019 NCAA Division I Indoor Track and Field Championships	Birmingham, Alabama	11th	5000 m	16:06.21

== Professional competition ==
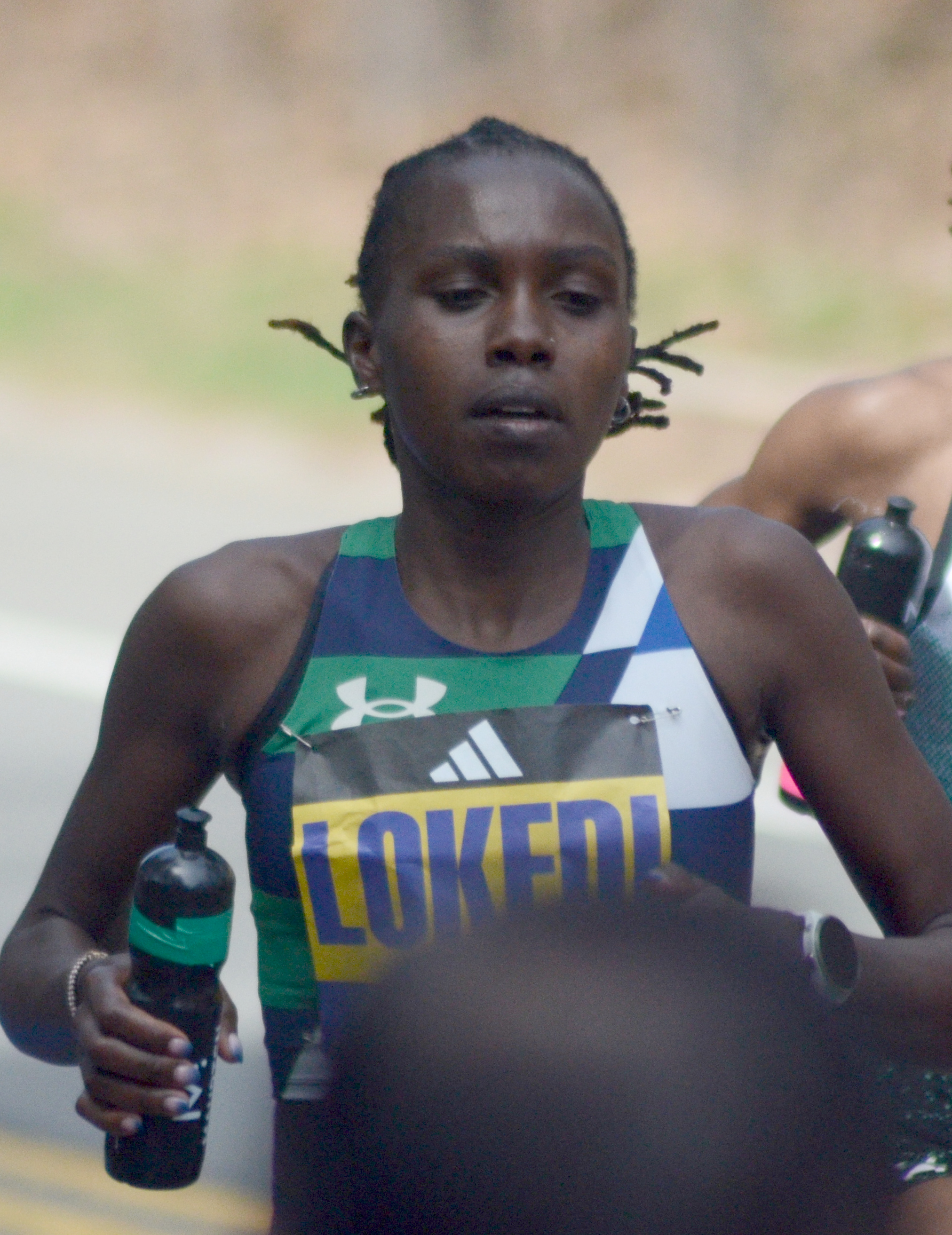
Sharon Lokedi in the 2025 Boston Marathon, which she won

In her first race as a pro, Lokedi easily won the Carlsbad 5K in 15:38 and her boyfriend of two years, Edward Cheserek, tied an IAAF world record of 13:29 in the men's race.

In November 2022, Lokedi pulled off an upset when debuting in the marathon as she triumphed by seven seconds in the New York City Marathon with a time of 2:23:23.

In April 2025, Lokedi won the 2025 Boston Marathon, setting a women's course record of 2:17:22.

Sponsored by Under Armour, she trains with the Mission Dark Sky Distance running group in Flagstaff.

== Personal bests ==
- 3000 meters – 9:14.18 (Chandler, AZ 2021)
- 5000 meters – 15:18.03 (Los Angeles, CA 2020)
- 10,000 meters – 31:11.07 (San Juan Capistrano, CA 2020)
- 5 kilometres – 15:16 (Boston, MA 2022)
- 10 kilometres – 31:06 (Manchester 2022)
- Half marathon – 1:05:00 (Copenhagen 2025)
- Marathon – 2:17:22 (Boston, MA 2025)
