= Track and field at the 2015 Military World Games – Women's 5000 metres =

The women's 5000 metres event at the 2015 Military World Games was held on 5 October at the KAFAC Sports Complex.

== Records ==
Prior to this competition, the existing world and CISM record were as follows:

World Record	Tirunesh Dibaba (ETH)	14:11.15	Oslo, Norway	6 June 2008
CISM World Record	Mihaela Botezan (ROM)	15:10.69	Catania, Italy	7 December 2003

== Schedule ==
Date	Time	Round
5 October 2015	17:15	Final

== Medalists ==
Gold	Silver	Bronze
Pauline Korikwiang; Kenya	Volha Mazuronak; Belarus	Sabrina Mockenhaupt; Germany

== Results ==
=== Final ===
Rank	Name	Nationality	Time	Notes
1st place, gold medalist(s)	Pauline Korikwiang	Kenya	15:23.85	
2nd place, silver medalist(s)	Volha Mazuronak	Belarus	15:35.21	
3rd place, bronze medalist(s)	Sabrina Mockenhaupt	Germany	15:35.75	
4	Mimi Belete	Bahrain	15:48.94	
5	Shuba Aman Ebo	Bahrain	15:56.71	
6	Dominika Napieraj	Poland	16:00.07	
7	Marion Jepkonga Kibor	Kenya	16:04.69	
8	Juliana Paula dos Santos	Brazil	16:08.95	
9	Samira Mezegrhane	France	16:10.69	
10	Katherine Ward	United States	17:09.34	
11	Georgette Mink	Canada	18:51.19	
	Salima Elouali Alami	Morocco	DNF	
