= Scott Fauble =

American long-distance runner

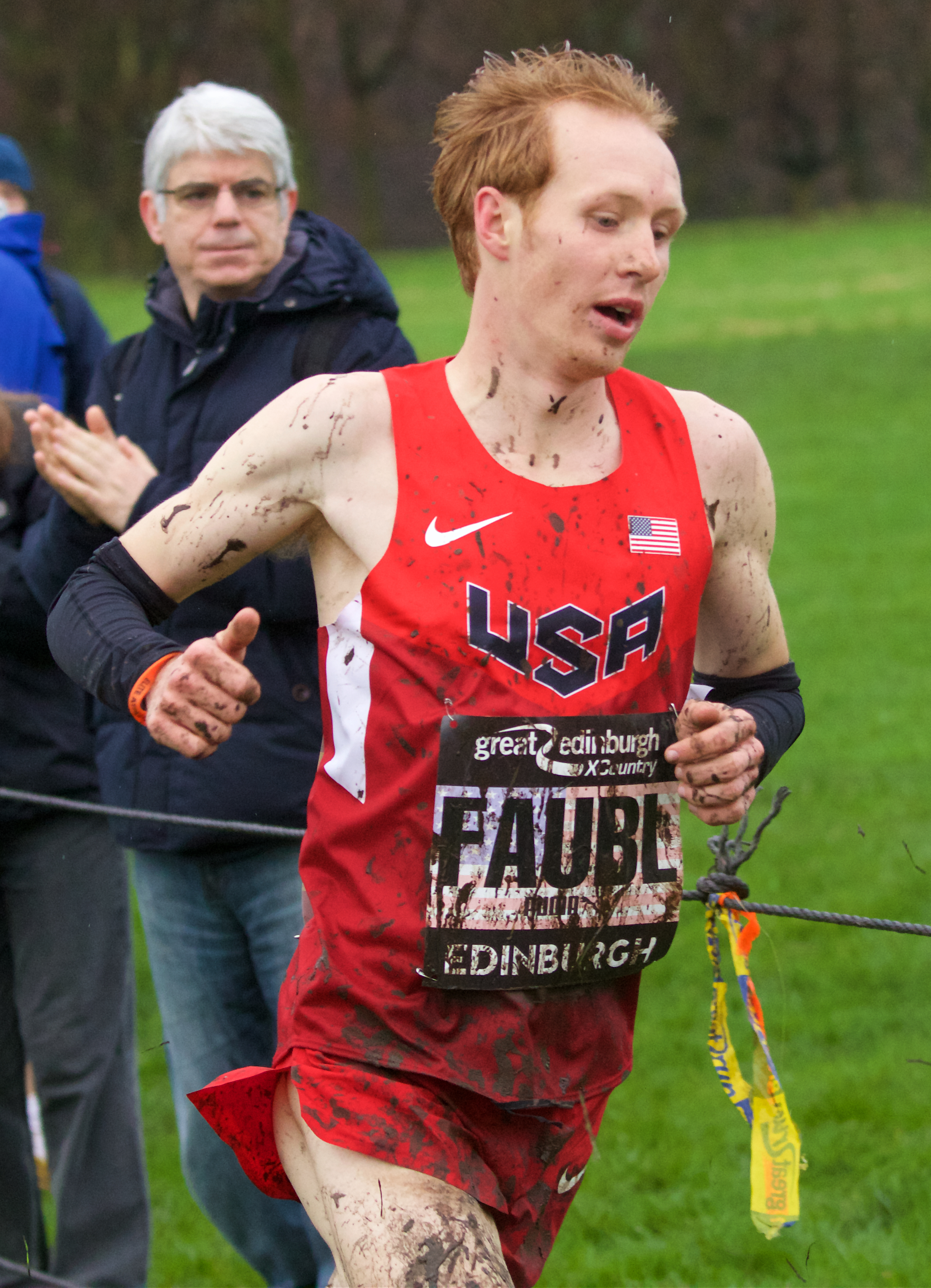
- Fauble at 2016 Great Edinburgh International Cross Country

Personal information
- Nationality: American
- Born: November 5, 1991 (age 34) Golden, Colorado
- Height: 183 cm (6 ft 0 in)

Sport
- Events: Mile, 5000 meters, 10,000 meters, marathon
- College team: Portland Pilots
- Club: Team Boss
- Turned pro: 2015
- Coached by: Joe Bosshard (2022 - Present); Ben Rosario (2015 - 2021); Rob Conner (2010 - 2015)

Scott Fauble (born November 5, 1991) is an American long distance runner. His best marathon time is 2:08:52. He is the co-author of Inside a Marathon: An All-Access Pass to a Top-10 Finish at NYC. Fauble explains how testing blood levels in Boulder has benefited his training in 2022.

== Early life ==
Fauble graduated from Wheat Ridge High School as a 2-time CHSAA state champion. He ran the Boulder Bolder in 2003 at age 11 in a time of 42:50.

2009 Foot Locker Cross Country Championships
17th place	15:44

Representing Wheat Ridge High School at Colorado High School Activities Association All-Class state championship
Year	Cross Country	Outdoor Track
2009-10	1st 15:24.2	1st in the 1600 m (4:19.85)
2009-10	1st 15:24.2	2nd in the 3200 m (9:15.52)
2008-09	5th 15:39.9	14th in the 1600 m (4:28.95)
2008-09	5th 15:39.9	7th in the 3200 m (9:40.62)
2007-08	6th 16:25.5	17th in the 1600 m (4:37.96)
2007-08	6th 16:25.5	7th in the 3200 m (9:44.03)
2006-07	17th 16:58.9	DNQ

== NCAA Portland Pilots ==
Fauble graduated from University of Portland as a 4-time NCAA Division I All-American where he received student athlete of the year and All American honors and led the 2014 cross country team to a third-place finish.

Year	Competition	Venue	Position	Event	Notes
Representing Portland Pilots
2015	2015 NCAA Division I Outdoor Track and Field Championships	Eugene, Oregon	DNF	10,000 metres	DNF
2014	2014 NCAA Division I Cross Country Championships	Terre Haute, Indiana	12th	10,000 metres	30:34.4
2014	West Coast Conference Cross Country Championships	Baylands Park	2nd	8000 metres	23:26.1
2014	2014 NCAA Division I Outdoor Track and Field Championships	Eugene, Oregon	50th	10,000 metres	30:36.56
2013	2013 NCAA Division I Cross Country Championships	Terre Haute, Indiana	13th	10,000 metres	30:21.3
2013	West Coast Conference Cross Country Championships	Pepperdine University	3rd	8000 metres	23:16.3
2013	2013 NCAA Division I Outdoor Track and Field Championships	Eugene, Oregon	61st	10,000 metres	30:55.42
2012	2012 NCAA Division I Cross Country Championships	Terre Haute, Indiana	26th	10,000 metres	29:50.8
2012	West Coast Conference Cross Country Championships	Fernhill Park (Oregon)	2nd	8000 metres	23:47.1
2012	2012 NCAA Division I Outdoor Track and Field Championships	Eugene, Oregon	11th	10,000 metres	29:30.57

== Pro career ==
Fauble turned professional in 2015 and raced for Hoka's Northern Arizona Elite team before departing at the end of 2021. He was part of A Time and Place which documented the team's runners in the lead up to the Olympic Trials.

=== 2016 ===
On April 30, Fauble placed 2nd in US Half Marathon Championship hosted by Columbus Marathon. He also qualified for the Olympic Trials in the 10,000 meter distance, where he placed fourth.

=== 2017 ===
In October 2017, Fauble finished 9th in the Frankfurt Marathon in a time of 2:12:35.

=== 2018 ===
On March 28, Fauble finished 5th in the New York City Half Marathon in 1:02:58.

On September 9, Fauble finished 4th in the Great North West Half Marathon in 1:02:18.

On November 4, Fauble finished 7th in the 2018 New York City Marathon in 2:12:28.

This was the year his Inside a Marathon, with coach Ben Rosario, was published. It told the story of how elites plan and train for a goal race.

=== 2019 ===
In February, Fauble won the Gasparilla Classic, his first win in four years. Fauble finished 7th in the 2019 Boston Marathon, as the first American and with a personal best of 2:09:09.

=== 2020 ===
Prior to the COVID-19 pandemic, Fauble finished 12th at the 2020 Olympic Trials.

== Competition record ==
Year	Competition	Venue	Position	Event	Notes
Representing the United States Hoka One One Northern Arizona Elite
2015	USATF Half marathon Road Running Championships	Houston	31st	Half Marathon	1:03:59
2016	2016 United States Olympic Trials (track and field)	Eugene, Oregon	4th	10,000 metres	28:45.53
2016	USATF Half marathon Road Running Championships	Columbus, Ohio	2nd	Half Marathon	1:03:06
2017	Frankfurt Marathon	Frankfurt, Germany	9th	Marathon	2:12:35
2017	2017 IAAF World Cross Country Championships – Senior men's race	Kampala, Uganda	30th	10 km	30:20
2017	2017 US Cross Country Championships – Senior men's race	Bend, Oregon	8th	10 km	30:56
2018	2018 New York City Marathon	New York City	7th	Marathon	2:12:28
2018	USATF 25 km Road Running Championships	Grand Rapids, Michigan	2nd	25 km	1:14:55
2019	2019 Boston Marathon	Boston, Massachusetts	7th	Marathon	2:09:09
2020	United States Olympic Trials	Atlanta, GA	12th	Marathon	2:12:39
2021	2021 Boston Marathon	Boston, Massachusetts	16th	Marathon	2:13:47
Representing Team Boss
2022	2022 Boston Marathon	Boston, Massachusetts	7th	Marathon	2:08:52
2022	New York City Marathon	New York City, New York	9th	Marathon	2:13:35
2023	2023 Boston Marathon	Boston, Massachusetts	7th	Marathon	2:09:44

== Personal bests ==
Distance	Time	Location	Date
1500m	3:45.94	Salem, OR	May 12, 2012
3000m	8:05.62	Portland, OR	May 17, 2015
5000m	13:50	Boston, MA	April 14, 2018
10,000m	28:00.43	Palo Alto, CA	April 1, 2016
12 km	35:39	Spokane, WA	May 7, 2017
15 km	46:22	Lake Nona, FL	November 22, 2015
10 Miles	47:39	Flint, MI	August 26, 2017
Half Marathon	1:01:11	Houston, TX	January 16, 2022
25 km	1:14:56	Grand Rapids, MI	May 12, 2018
Marathon	2:08:52	Boston, MA	April 18, 2022
