= Tomoka Kimura =

Japanese long-distance runner

Personal information
- Born: 12 November 1994 (age 30)

Sport
- Country: Japan
- Sport: Long-distance running

Tomoka Kimura (木村 友香, Kimura Tomoka; born 12 November 1994) is a Japanese long-distance runner. She competed in the women's 5000 metres event at the 2019 World Athletics Championships held in Doha, Qatar. She did not qualify to compete in the final.

She competed in the junior women's race at the 2011 IAAF World Cross Country Championships held in Punta Umbría, Spain. In the same year, she also competed in the girls' 3000 metres event at the 2011 World Youth Championships in Athletics held in Lille Métropole, France. She finished in 7th place.

In 2015, she competed in the senior women's race at the 2015 IAAF World Cross Country Championships held in Guiyang, China. She finished in 63rd place.
