= Bali Marathon =

Annual race in Indonesia since 2012

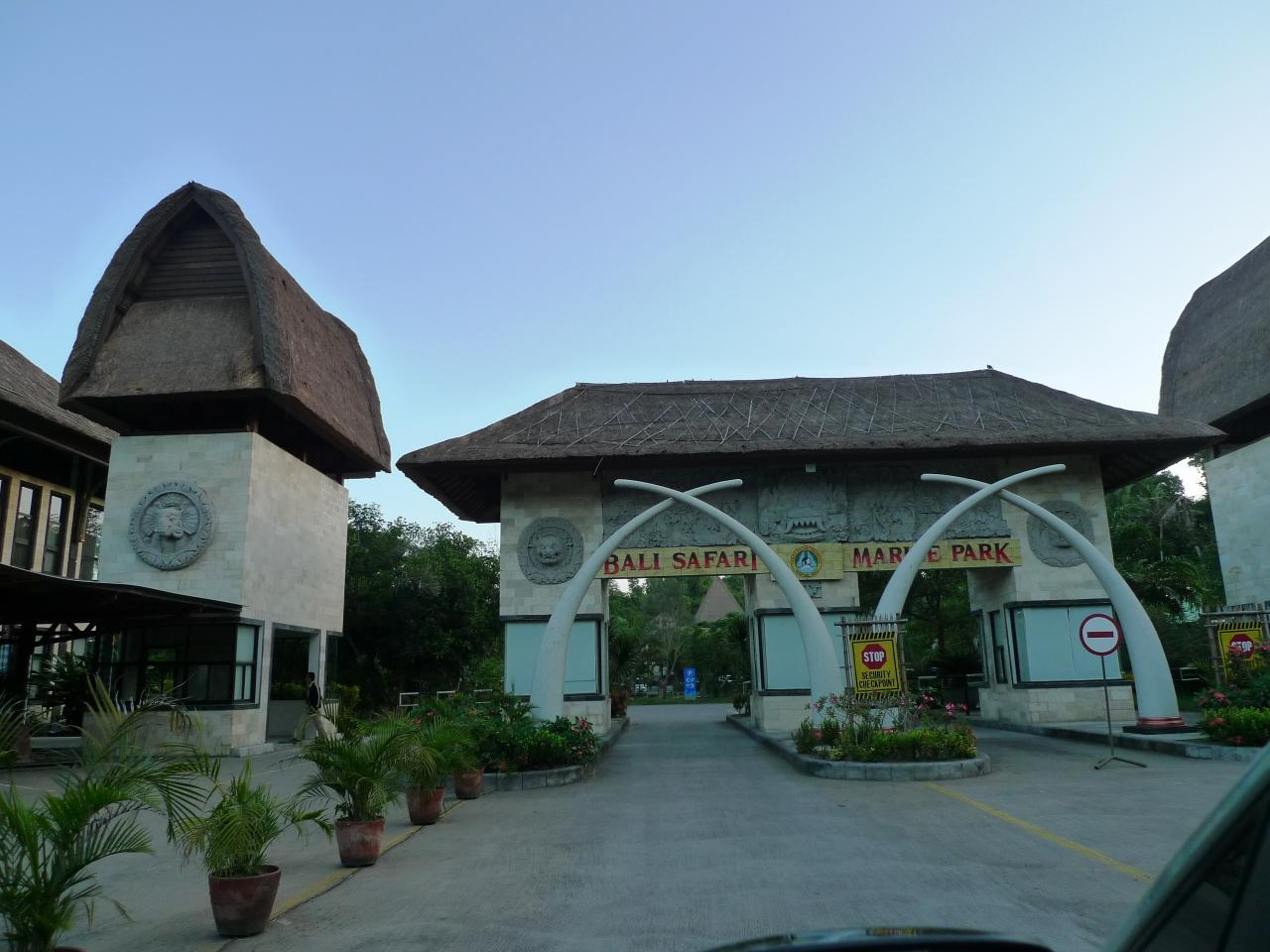
- Bali Safari & Marine Park, near the start and finish
- Date: August or September
- Location: Gianyar Regency, Bali, Indonesia
- Event type: Road
- Distance: Marathon, half marathon, 10K run
- Primary sponsor: Maybank
- Established: 2012 (14 years ago) (current era)
- Course records: Men's: 2:15:04 (2023) (Kenya) Geoffrey Birgen; Women's: 2:31:04 (2023) (Kenya) Sophy Jepchirchir
- Website: Official website

The Bali Marathon (also known as the Maybank Marathon or Maybank Bali Marathon) is an annual road-based marathon hosted in the Gianyar Regency on the island of Bali in Indonesia. The current version of the marathon has been held since 2012, although the first marathon to be held regularly on Bali was inaugurated in 1999. The marathon is a World Athletics Elite Label Road Race and a member of the Association of International Marathons and Distance Races.

== History ==
=== Initial era ===
The inaugural race was held on 4 April 1999 as the "Karangasem Bali International Marathon". A total of 147 runners participated in the event, which included a half marathon and a 10K run.

== Past winners ==
Key: Course record

Year	Men's winner	Time (h:m:s)	Women's winner	Time (h:m:s)
2012	Kennedy Lilan (KEN)	2:16:54	Winfrida Kwamboka (KEN)	2:42:48
2013	Kennedy Lilan (KEN)	2:18:51	Meseret Mengistu (ETH)	2:38:17
2014	Kennedy Lilan (KEN)	2:18:52	Elizabeth Chemweno (KEN)	2:47:35
2015	Elijah Mbogo (KEN)	2:17:16	Elizabeth Rumokol (KEN)	2:38:58
2016	Julius Mbugua (KEN)	2:29:46	Ednah Koech (KEN)	2:55:45
2017	Henry Sang (KEN)	2:19:17	Elizabeth Rumokol (KEN)	2:38:38
2018	Cosmas Muteti (KEN)	2:15:25	Rebecca Korir (KEN)	2:45:29
2019	Simon Kiprugut (KEN)	2:18:34	Immaculate Chemutai (UGA)	2:42:08
2022	Hassan Toriss (MAR)	2:15:38	Immaculate Chemutai (UGA)	2:42:33
2023	Geoffrey Birgen (KEN)	2:15:04	Sophy Jepchirchir (KEN)	2:31:04
2024	Paul Tiongik (KEN)	2:18:25	Aurelia Kiptui (KEN)	2:36:59
2025	Evans Mayaka (KEN)	2:17:01	Medanit Feyera (ETH)	2:40:03
2026	Michael Kimani (KEN)	2:16:10	Veronica Njeri (KEN)	2:37:22
