= 2011 World Youth Championships in Athletics – Girls' 3000 metres =

Girls' 3000 metres at the 2011 World Youth Championships in Athletics
- Venue: Stadium Lille Métropole
- Dates: 6 July
- Competitors: 16
- Winning time: 8:56.36 WYL

Medalists
gold medal	Gotytom Gebreslase	Ethiopia
silver medal	Ziporah Wanjiru Kingori	Kenya
bronze medal	Caroline Chepkoech Kipkirui	Kenya

The girls' 3000 metres at the 2011 World Youth Championships in Athletics was held at the Stadium Lille Métropole on 6 July.

== Medalists ==
Gold	Silver	Bronze
Gotytom Gebreslase; Ethiopia	Ziporah Wanjiru Kingori; Kenya	Caroline Chepkoech Kipkirui; Kenya

== Records ==
Prior to the competition, the following records were as follows.

World Youth Best	Ma Ningning (CHN)	8:36.45	Jinan, China	6 June 1993
Championship Record	Mercy Cherono (KEN)	8:53.94	Ostrava, Czech Republic	11 July 2007
World Youth Leading	Genet Tibieso (ETH)	9:00.87	Marseille, France	4 June 2011

== Results ==
Rank	Name	Nationality	Time	Notes
1	Gotytom Gebreslase	Ethiopia	8:56.36	WYL
2	Ziporah Wanjiru Kingori	Kenya	8:56.82	PB
3	Caroline Chepkoech Kipkirui	Kenya	8:58.83	PB
4	Alena Kudashkina	Russia	9:01.51	PB
5	Alemitu Heroye	Ethiopia	9:04.32	PB
6	Katsuki Suga	Japan	9:05.62	PB
7	Tomoka Kimura	Japan	9:11.36	
8	Anca Maria Bunea	Romania	9:25.11	PB
9	Luula Berhane Kebedom	Eritrea	9:32.17	PB
10	Claudia Estévez	Spain	9:34.70	PB
11	Mariia Khodakivska	Ukraine	9:38.65	PB
12	Emine Hatun Tuna	Turkey	9:44.44	PB
13	Luminita Achim	Romania	9:55.29	
14	Thea Krokan Murud	Norway	9:58.41	
15	Kefilwe Galeitsewe	Botswana	10:05.96	
16	Oona Kettunen	Finland	DNS	

Intermediate leaders:

- 1000 m: (Japan) Tomoka Kimura: 2:58.83
- 2000 m: (Ethiopia) Alemitu Heroye: 6:05.35
