= Gladys Cherono Kiprono =

Kenyan long-distance runner

Gladys Cherono
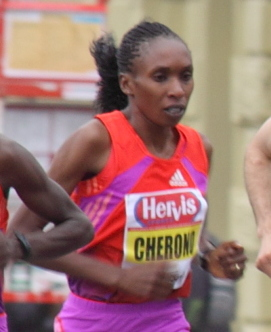
- Hervis Prague Half Marathon 2012

Personal information
- Full name: Gladys Cherono Kiprono
- Born: 12 May 1983 (age 43) Nairobi, Kenya

Sport
- Country: Kenya
- Sport: Long-distance running
- Event: Marathon

Achievements and titles
- Personal bests: Marathon: 2:18:11; Half Marathon: 1:06:07; 10000 m: 30:29.23; 5000 m: 14:47.12
Medal record
Women's athletics
Representing Kenya
World Championships
Silver medal – second place	2013 Moscow	10000 m
World Half Marathon Championships
Gold medal – first place	2014 Copenhagen	Individual
Gold medal – first place	2014 Copenhagen	Team
African Championships
Gold medal – first place	2012 Porto-Novo	5000 m
Gold medal – first place	2012 Porto-Novo	10,000 m

Gladys Cherono Kiprono (born 12 May 1983) is a Kenyan professional long-distance runner who competes in track and road running events. She became the first woman to win both the 5000 metres and 10,000 metres at the African Championships in 2012. She is a three-time winner of the Berlin Marathon and the 8th fastest women marathoner of all time (as of 2020).

== Career ==
She started running in Spanish road races in 2004. She set a personal best of 71:19 minutes to win the 2005 Media Maratón Santa Pola and also won at the Granollers Half Marathon. She continued to compete at low level races and was runner-up at the 2007 Reims Half Marathon. She won that race the following year and improved her best at the Porto Half Marathon, running 70:43 minutes for third. She bettered that time at the 2009 Valladolid Half Marathon, taking the title with a run of 69:26 minutes, and was runner-up at the Porto race. She made few competitive appearances over the following 18 months, but won the Zhuhai Half Marathon on her Asian debut in December 2011.

Cherono broke into the elite ranks in 2012. She was third at both the RAK Half Marathon and the Prague Half Marathon, recording a best of 68:18 minutes at the latter race. She also progressed on the track, taking the 5000 metres and 10,000 metres titles at the Kenya Defence Forces Championships. She was chosen to run these events at the 2012 African Championships in Athletics and, in the absence of higher profile athletes, she became the first woman to win both distance races at the championships. Her run of 15:40.04 minutes for the 5000 m gold medal was a championship record. She was not chosen to compete at the 2012 Summer Olympics and instead went on to win at the Bogotá Half Marathon and Tilburg 10K.

She won the Kenya Defence Forces Cross Country title at the start of 2013, then ran a personal best of 1:06:48 to win the Prague Half Marathon – a time which brought her into the top 10 fastest women half-marathoner of all time. She won the national trial event for the 10,000 m and went on to take the silver medal behind Tirunesh Dibaba. She ended the year with runner-up finishes at the BOclassic and the Delhi Half Marathon.

In September 2015, in her second time competing at the marathon distance, she won the Berlin Marathon in 2:19:25 (a personal best by 38 seconds), which at the time made her the 7th fastest women marathoner of all time. Later in February 2016, Cherono finished the RAK Half Marathon in 1:06:07 (a personal best by 31 seconds), which at the time made her the 4th fastest women half-marathoner of all time. In 2017, Cherono won her second Berlin Marathon with a time of 2:20:23. The following year, she won the Berlin Marathon for the third time with a time of 2:18:11 and set a course record.

As of 2020, Gladys Cherono is the 8th fastest women marathoner of all time and the 24th fastest in the half-marathon distance.

=== World Marathon Majors results ===
World Marathon Majors	2015	2016	2017	2018	2019
Tokyo Marathon	-	-	-	-	-
Boston Marathon	-	-	5th	-	-
London Marathon	-	-	-	4th	4th
Berlin Marathon	1st	-	1st	1st	DNF
Chicago Marathon	-	-	-	-	-
New York City Marathon	-	-	-	-	-
