= Abraham Chebii =

Kenyan long-distance runner

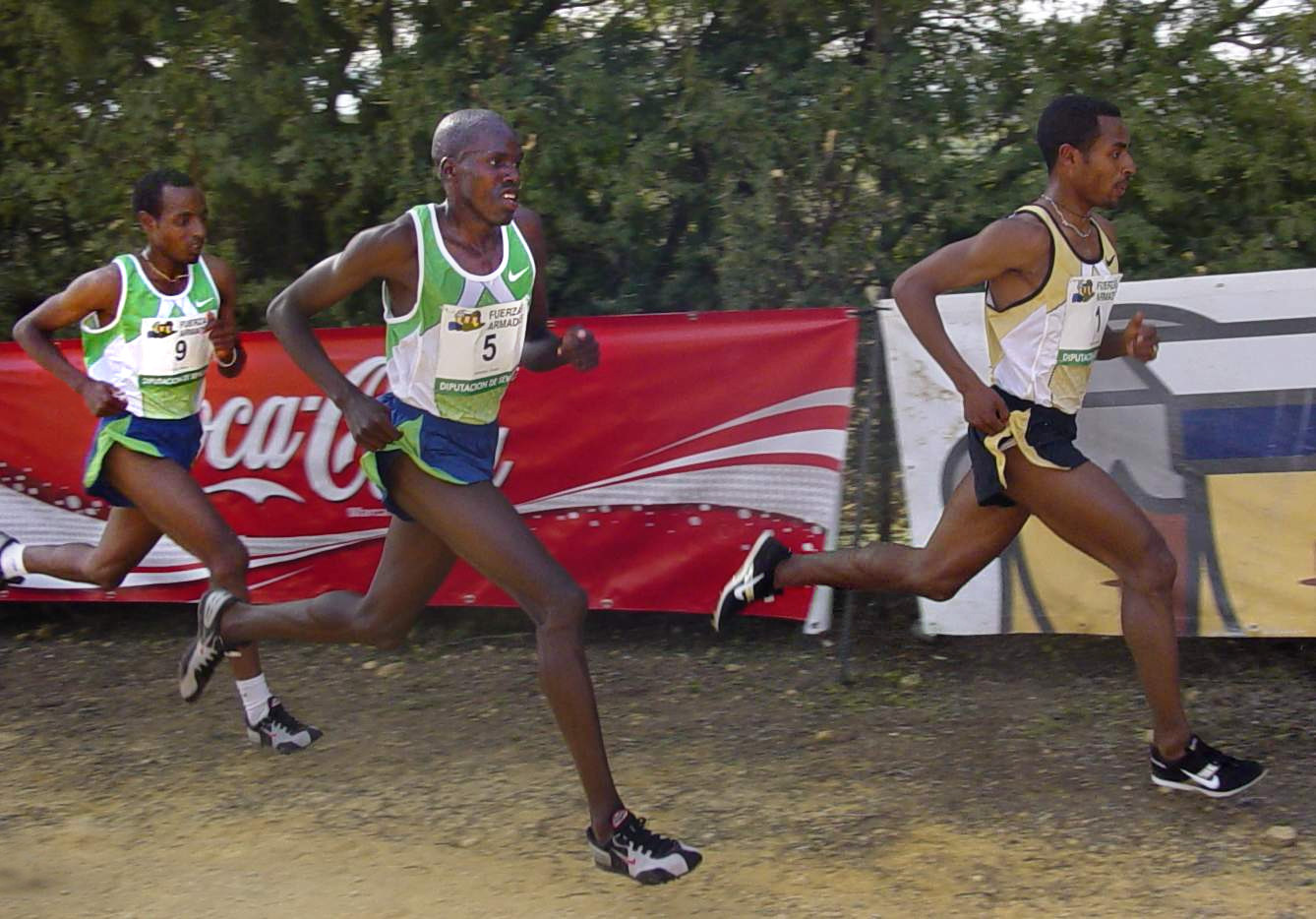
- Chebii (center) follows Kenenisa Bekele at the 2007 Cross Internacional de Itálica

Personal information
- Full name: Abraham Kosgei Chebii
- Nationality: Kenyan
- Born: 23 December 1979 (age 46) Kaptabuk, Marakwet District, Kenya
- Home town: Eldoret, Kenya
- Education: Marakwet High School

Sport
- Country: Kenya
- Sport: Athletics
- Events: 5000 metres, Half marathon, Cross country
- Club: Kimbia Athletics
- Coached by: Dieter Hogen

Achievements and titles
- Personal bests: 5000 m: 12:52.99 (Oslo 2003); Half marathon: 1:00:07 (Rome 2011)
Medal record
Men's athletics
Representing Kenya
World Cross Country Championships
| Silver medal – second place | 2005 Saint-Galmier | Short race |
| Silver medal – second place | 2005 Saint-Galmier | Team |
IAAF Grand Prix Final
| Gold medal – first place | 2002 Paris | 3000 m |
World Athletics Final
| Bronze medal – third place | 2003 Monte Carlo | 3000 m |

Abraham Kosgei Chebii (born 23 December 1979 in Kaptabuk, Marakwet District) is a former Kenyan runner who specialized in the 5000 metres. His personal best time is 12:52.99 minutes, achieved in June 2003 in Oslo.

== Career ==
He represented Kenya at the 2004 Athens Olympics and reached the final but failed to finish the race. Chebii won the individual and team silver medals in the short race at the 2005 IAAF World Cross Country Championships. He has won a number of races on the athletics circuit including the Cross Internacional de Itálica in 2002 and the Great Ireland Run in 2007 and 2008. He gained selection for the 5000 m at the 2009 IAAF World Athletics Final and came in ninth place.

He won the Discovery Kenya Half Marathon in Eldoret in January 2011, beating the runner-up Vincent Kipruto by a small margin of eleven seconds. His next outing came at the Roma-Ostia Half Marathon and he came third, achieving a personal best of 1:00:07 on the flat course.

He graduated from Marakwet High School in 1997. He was spotted by Moses Kiptanui whose team Chebii joined.

He belongs to Kimbia Athletics team and is managed by Tom Ratcliffe and coached by Dieter Hogen. Chebii belongs to Marakwet, a tribe of Kalenjin people. He lives now in Eldoret, Kenya. He is married and with two children (as of 2006).

== Achievements ==
| Year | Competition | Venue | Position | Notes |
Representing Kenya
| 2000 | World Cross Country Championships | Vilamoura, Portugal | 5th | Short race |
| 2002 | IAAF Grand Prix Final | Paris, France | 1st | 3000 m |
| 2003 | World Championships | Paris, France | 4th | 5000 m |
| 2003 | World Athletics Final | Monte Carlo, Monaco | 3rd | 3000 m |
| 2004 | Summer Olympics | Athens, Greece | DNF | 5000 m |
| 2004 | World Athletics Final | Monte Carlo, Monaco | 9th | 3000 m |
| 2005 | World Cross Country Championships | Saint-Galmier, France | 2nd | Short race |
| 2005 | World Cross Country Championships | Saint-Galmier, France | 2nd | Team |
| 2009 | World Athletics Final | Thessaloniki, Greece | 9th | 5000 m |
