= 2012 African Championships in Athletics – Women's 10,000 metres =

The women's 10,000 metres at the 2012 African Championships in Athletics was held at the Stade Charles de Gaulle on 30 June.

== Medalists ==
Gold	Gladys Cherono; Kenya
Silver	Priscah Jepleting Cherono; Kenya
Bronze	Betsy Saina; Kenya

== Records ==
Standing records prior to the 2012 African Championships in Athletics
World record	Wang Junxia (CHN)	29:31.78	Beijing, PR China	8 September 1993
African record	Meselech Melkamu (ETH)	29:53.80	Utrecht, Netherlands	14 June 2009
Championship record	Edith Masai (KEN)	31:27.96	Bambous, Mauritius	12 August 2006

== Schedule ==
Date	Time	Round
30 June 2012	16:35	Final

== Results ==
=== Final ===
Rank	Name	Nationality	Time	Note
1st place, gold medalist(s)	Gladys Cherono	Kenya	32:41.40	
2nd place, silver medalist(s)	Priscah Jepleting Cherono	Kenya	32:45.73	
3rd place, bronze medalist(s)	Betsy Saina	Kenya	32:48.36	
4	Merima Mohammed	Ethiopia	33:09.25	
5	Mihret Derbe	Ethiopia	33:45.88	
6	Claudette Mukasakindi	Rwanda	33:51.57	
7	Afera Godfay	Ethiopia	34:30.23	
	Mammie Konneh	Sierra Leone	DNS	
