= Gotytom Gebreslase =

Ethiopian long-distance runner

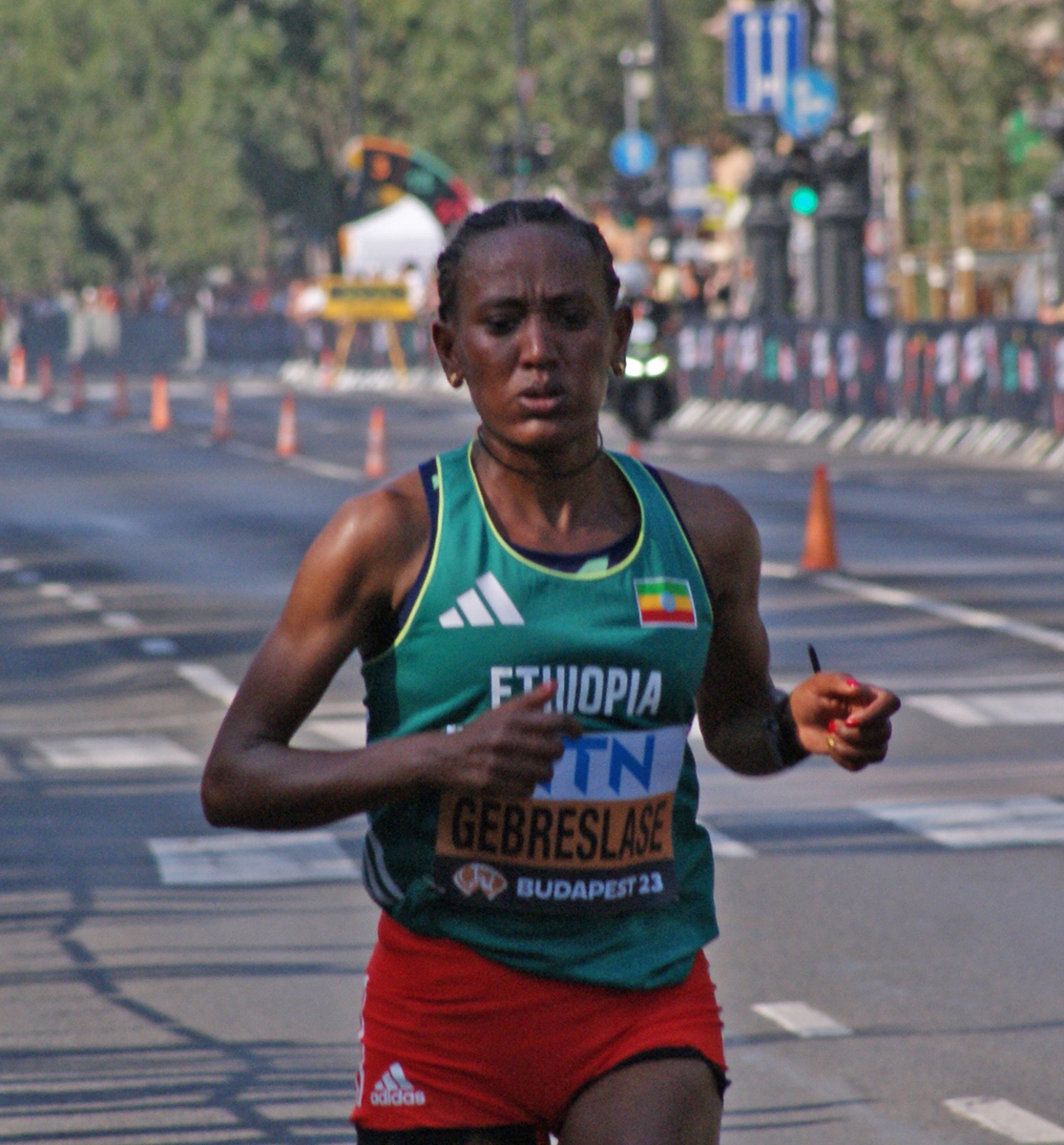

Personal information
- Nationality: Ethiopian
- Born: 15 January 1995 (age 31) May Keyah, Tigray Region, Ethiopia

Sport
- Country: Ethiopia
- Sport: Athletics
- Event: Long-distance running
Medal record
Women's athletics
Representing Ethiopia
World Championships
Gold medal – first place	2022 Eugene	Marathon
Silver medal – second place	2023 Budapest	Marathon
African Championships
Bronze medal – third place	2012 Porto-Novo	5000 m
World Youth Championships
Gold medal – first place	2011 Villeneuve-d'Ascq	3000 m
World Marathon Majors
Gold medal – first place	2021 Berlin	Marathon
Bronze medal – third place	2021 Tokyo	Marathon
Bronze medal – third place	2022 New York	Marathon

Gotytom Gebreslase (born 15 January 1995) is an Ethiopian long-distance runner. She won the gold medal in the marathon at the 2022 World Athletics Championships. In 2021, in her marathon debut, Gebreslase took victory in the women's race at the Berlin Marathon in Germany.

She ran in the delayed 2021 Tokyo Marathon and finished third in a time of 2:18:18. She also placed third at the 2022 New York City Marathon.

== Career ==
At 16 years old, Gotytom Gebreslase won the gold medal in the girls' 3000 metres at the 2011 World Youth Championships in Athletics held in Villeneuve-d'Ascq, France.

The next year, she earned the bronze medal in the women's 5000 meters event at the 2012 African Championships in Athletics in Porto-Novo, Benin.

In 2013, Gebreslase competed in the junior women's race at the World Cross Country Championships held in Bydgoszcz, Poland.

In 2015, she finished in fourth place in the women's 5000 metres at the African Games in Brazzaville, Congo.

== Achievements ==
=== International competitions ===
Representing Ethiopia
Year	Competition	Venue	Position	Event	Time
2011	World Youth Championships	Villeneuve-d'Ascq, France	1st	3000 m	8:56.36 WU18L
2011	All-Africa Games	Maputo, Mozambique	6th	5000 m	15:49.90
2012	African Championships	Porto-Novo, Benin	3rd	5000 m	15:53.34
2013	World Cross Country Championships	Bydgoszcz, Poland	12th	Junior race	18:44
2015	African Games	Brazzaville, Republic of the Congo	4th	5000 m	15:42.44
2022	World Championships	Eugene, United States	1st	Marathon	2:18:11 CR
2023	World Championships	Budapest, Hungary	2nd	Marathon	2:24:34
World Marathon Majors
2021	Berlin Marathon	Berlin, Germany	1st	Marathon	2:20:09
2022	Tokyo Marathon	Tokyo, Japan	3rd	Marathon	2:18:18
2022	New York City Marathon	New York, United States	3rd	Marathon	2:23:39

=== Personal bests ===
- 5000 metres – 14:57.33 (Heusden-Zolder 2015)
- 10,000 metres – 31:14.52 (Hengelo 2016)

Road

- 10 kilometres – 32:07 (Shelter Island, NY 2017)
- Half marathon – 1:05:36 (Manama 2021)
- Marathon – 2:18:11 (Eugene, OR 2022)
