= Athletics at the 2011 All-Africa Games – Women's 10,000 metres =

The women's 10,000 metres event at the 2011 All-Africa Games was held on 14 September.

== Results ==
Rank	Name	Nationality	Time	Notes
1st place, gold medalist(s)	Sule Utura	Ethiopia	33:24.82	
2nd place, silver medalist(s)	Wude Ayalew	Ethiopia	33:24.88	
3rd place, bronze medalist(s)	Pauline Korikwiang	Kenya	33:26.17	
4	Pauline Kahenya	Kenya	33:26.98	
5	Claudette Mukasakindi	Rwanda	35:18.05	
6	Adene Tersralem	Eritrea	35:20.02	
	Meselech Melkamu	Ethiopia	DNF	
	Grace Momanyi	Kenya	DNF	
	Hortencia Lichimane	Mozambique	DNF	
