= Fantu Jifar =

Ethiopian long-distance runner

Personal information
- Nationality: Ethiopian
- Born: Fantu Zewude Jifar; 26 September 1996 (age 29) Ethiopia
- Occupation: long-distance runner
- Years active: 2018–present

Sport
- Country: Ethiopia
- Sport: Athletics
- Event(s): Marathon, Half marathon, 10 km

Achievements and titles
- Personal bests: Marathon: 2:25:45 (2023); Half marathon: 1:11:40 (2024); 10 km: 33:51.70 (2023)
Medal record
Athletics
Representing Ethiopia
Gold medal – first place	2024 Singapore Marathon	Marathon
Silver medal – second place	2024 Taiyuan Marathon	Marathon
Bronze medal – third place	2022 Philadelphia Marathon	Marathon
Bronze medal – third place	2021 Rome Marathon	Marathon
Silver medal – second place	2024 Dalian Marathon	Marathon

Fantu Zewude Jifar (born 26 September 1996) is an Ethiopian long-distance runner who competes primarily in marathon events.

== Career ==
Fantu Zewude Jifar began her marathon career in 2018. Early results include an eighth-place finish at the Shanghai International Marathon in 2:32:37 in November 2018. In 2019, she placed second at the Gran Canaria Marathon with a time of 2:45:18.

In 2021, Jifar finished third at the Run Rome The Marathon with a time of 2:32:02. The following year, 2022, saw her achieve a third-place finish at the Philadelphia Marathon (2:33:03) and a second-place finish at the Leiden Marathon (2:31:58).

Her marathon personal best of 2:25:45 was set at the Taiyuan Marathon on 21 May 2023, where she finished second. In November 2023, she placed tenth at the 2023 New York City Marathon with a time of 2:34:10.

In 2024, Jifar achieved significant results. She won the 2024 Singapore Marathon with a time of 2:39:04. Earlier in the year, she finished second at the Taiyuan Marathon with a time of 2:26:46 and placed 17th at the Zurich Maratón de Sevilla with a time of 2:25:53. She also finished fourth at the Wuxi Marathon with a time of 2:25:51 and secured second place at the Dalian Marathon with a time of 2:28:44.

Her personal bests in other events include a half marathon time of 1:11:40 (set in March 2024) and a 10 km road time of 33:51.70 (set in June 2023, winning the Shelter Island 10K).

== Achievements ==
Year	Race	Place	Position	Time
2018	Shanghai International Marathon	Shanghai	8th	2:32:37
2019	Gran Canaria Maratón	Las Palmas de Gran Canaria	2nd	2:45:18
2021	Run Rome The Marathon	Rome	3rd	2:32:02
2022	Leiden Marathon	Leiden	2nd	2:31:58
2022	Philadelphia Marathon	Philadelphia	3rd	2:33:03
2023	Taiyuan Marathon	Taiyuan	2nd	2:25:45 (PB)
2023	2023 New York City Marathon	New York City	10th	2:34:10
2023	Shelter Island 10K	Shelter Island, New York	1st	33:51.70 (PB)
2024	Zurich Maratón de Sevilla	Seville	17th	2:25:53
2024	Wuxi Marathon	Wuxi	4th	2:25:51
2024	Dalian Marathon	Dalian	2nd	2:28:44
2024	Taiyuan Marathon	Taiyuan	2nd	2:26:46
2024	2024 Singapore Marathon	Singapore	1st	2:39:04
