= Benard Kimeli =

Kenyan long-distance runner

Personal information
- Nationality: Kenyan
- Born: 10 September 1995 (age 30)

Sport
- Country: Kenya
- Sport: Athletics
- Event: Long-distance running
- Team: Fujitsu

Benard Kimeli (born 10 September 1995) is a Kenyan long-distance runner.

== Career ==
In 2020, he competed in the men's race at the 2020 World Athletics Half Marathon Championships held in Gdynia, Poland.

In 2017, he won the Singelloop Utrecht held in Utrecht, Netherlands. He won the Prague Half Marathon held in Prague, Czech Republic in 2018 and in 2019.

He also finished in 8th place in the 2021 Berlin Marathon.

As of 2022, Kimeli was employed by Fujitsu as part of its corporate athletics team.
