= 2021 Berlin Marathon =

Running race in 2021

47th Berlin Marathon
- Venue: Berlin, Germany
- Dates: 26 September 2021

Champions
- Men: Guye Adola (2:05:45)
- Women: Gotytom Gebreslase (2:20:09)
- Wheelchair men: Marcel Hug (1:24:03)
- Wheelchair women: Manuela Schär (1:37:31)

The 2021 Berlin Marathon was a marathon race held on 26 September 2021. It was the 47th edition of the annual Berlin Marathon. It was the first edition of the Berlin Marathon to take place after the start of the COVID-19 pandemic in 2019. The 2020 Berlin Marathon was cancelled as a result of the COVID-19 pandemic. The race was the first of the five World Marathon Majors held in 2021; all the events in the series took place in the space of six weeks between late September and early November. The marathon distance is just over 26 miles (42 km) in length and the course is run around the city and starts and finishes in the Tiergarten.

The marathon was won by Guye Adola and Gotytom Gebreslase, both of Ethiopia, in 2:05:45 and 2:20:09, respectively, while the wheelchair race was won by Marcel Hug and Manuela Schär, both of Switzerland, in 1:24:03 and 1:37:31, respectively.

== Results ==
Results for the top ten in the running races and top three in the wheelchair races are listed below.

Men's race result
Position	Athlete	Nationality	Time
1st place, gold medalist(s)	Guye Adola	Ethiopia	2:05:45
2nd place, silver medalist(s)	Bethwel Yegon	Kenya	2:06:14
3rd place, bronze medalist(s)	Kenenisa Bekele	Ethiopia	2:06:47
4	Tadu Abate	Ethiopia	2:08:24
5	Cosmas Muteti	Kenya	2:08:45
6	Philemon Kacheran	Kenya	2:09:29
7	Okubay Tsegay	Eritrea	2:10:37
8	Benard Kimeli	Kenya	2:10:50
9	Hidekazu Hijikata	Japan	2:11:47
10	Hosea Kipkemboi	Kenya	2:12:25

Women's race result
Position	Athlete	Nationality	Time
1st place, gold medalist(s)	Gotytom Gebreslase	Ethiopia	2:20:09
2nd place, silver medalist(s)	Hiwot Gebrekidan	Ethiopia	2:21:23
3rd place, bronze medalist(s)	Helen Tola	Ethiopia	2:23:05
4	Edith Chelimo	Kenya	2:24:33
5	Shure Demise	Ethiopia	2:24:43
6	Fancy Chemutai	Kenya	2:24:58
7	Izabela Paszkiewicz	Poland	2:27:41
8	Ruth Chebitok	Kenya	2:28:18
9	Rabea Schöneborn	Germany	2:28:49
10	Martina Strähl	Switzerland	2:30:37

Wheelchair men's race result
Position	Athlete	Nationality	Time
1st place, gold medalist(s)	Marcel Hug	Switzerland	1:24:03
2nd place, silver medalist(s)	Daniel Romanchuk	United States	1:24:47
3rd place, bronze medalist(s)	Brent Lakatos	Canada	1:29:54

Wheelchair women's race result
Position	Athlete	Nationality	Time
1st place, gold medalist(s)	Manuela Schär	Switzerland	1:37:31
2nd place, silver medalist(s)	Tatyana McFadden	United States	1:38:54
3rd place, bronze medalist(s)	Aline Rocha	Brazil	1:41:39
