= Song Liwei =

Chinese basketball player

Personal information
- Born: August 16, 1985 (age 41) Qiqihar, Heilongjiang, China
- Listed height: 6 ft 3 in (1.91 m)

Career information
- Playing career: 2002–2013
- Position: Power forward

Career history
- 2002–2008: Heilongjiang Dragons
- 2008–2013: Shenyang Army Golden Lions

Song Liwei (Chinese: 宋力维, born 16 August 1985) is a retired Chinese basketball player. She represented China at 2006 FIBA World Championship and the 2010 FIBA World Championship.
