= Bethwel Yegon =

Kenyan marathon runner

Personal information
- Born: 5 January 1993 (age 33) Kenya

Sport
- Sport: Athletics
Medal record
Marathon
World Marathon Majors
Representing Kenya
Silver medal – second place	2021 Berlin	Marathon

Bethwel Yegon (born 5 January 1993) is a Kenyan marathon runner, who came second at the 2021 Berlin Marathon.

== Career ==
In 2018, Yegon came fourth at the Kaptagat Forest Half Marathon race. In 2019, he came second in the 10 kilometre Stadsloop Appingedam race, finishing behind countryman Shadrack Koech. Later in the year, he finished eighth at the 2019 Berlin Marathon in a time of 2:08:35. It was his marathon debut.

Yegon was one of four Kenyans that competed at the 2021 Berlin Marathon, the other three being Festus Talam, Michael Njenga and Benard Kimeli. He finished second in a time of 2:06.14, ahead of third-placed Ethiopian Kenenisa Bekele, who had been the favourite to win. He was the highest finishing Kenyan in the race. At the race's half distance, Yegon had been 82 seconds behind the leading group. He caught up to 17 seconds behind after 35 kilometres (22 mi) of the race, before overtaking Bekele.
