= Kaptabuk =

Kaptabuk is a village and an administrative location in the Kapsowar Division of Elgeyo Marakwet County, Kenya. Nearest towns are Kapsowar and Iten, (both in Elgeyo-Marakwet County).

Kaptabuk is the birthplace of Kenyan runner Abraham Chebii.
