= Veronica Nyaruai =

Kenyan runner

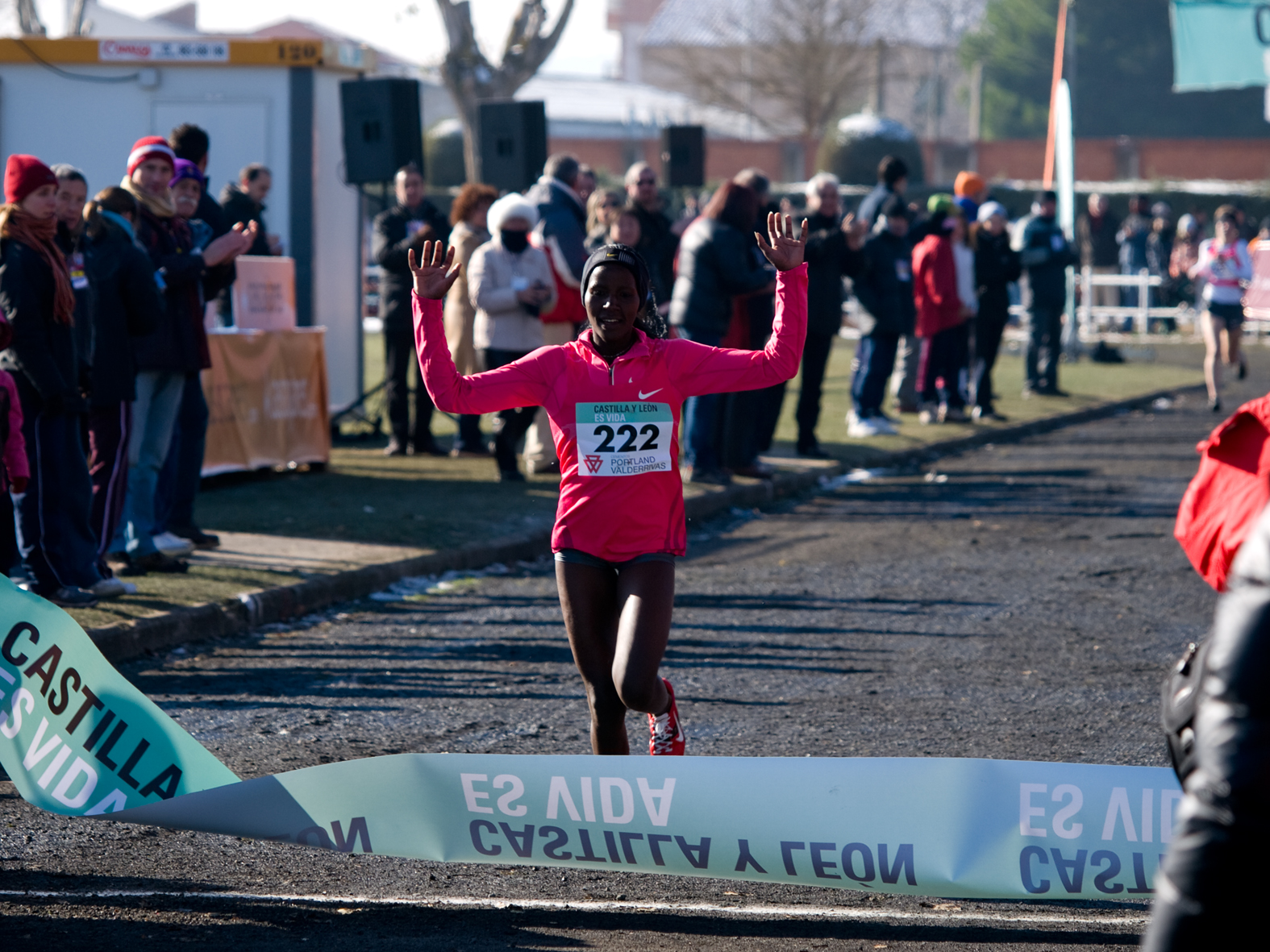
- Nyaruai winning the 2009 Cross Internacional de Venta de Baños

Medal record

Women's athletics

Representing Kenya

African Championships
Silver medal – second place	2012 Porto-Novo	5000 m

Veronica Nyaruai Wanjiru (born October 29, 1989 in Nyahururu) is a Kenyan runner who specialises in 1500 metres. She lives in Kaptagat, where she attends PACE training camp.

She took part at the 2007 world Championships, but was 12th overall and missed the 1500 m final.

In 2008, she would have been eligible to defend her Junior World title, but she placed fourth at the Kenyan trial and was not selected.

She is based at the PACE Sports Management training camp in Kaptagat.

Nyaruai won the Cross Internacional de Venta de Baños in 2009, beating Steph Twell in the process.

== Achievements ==
Year	Competition	Venue	Position	Event	Notes
Representing Kenya
2005	World Cross Country Championships	Saint-Galmier, France	2nd	Junior race (6.153 km)	20:56
2005	World Youth Championships	Marrakesh, Morocco	1st	3000 m	9:01.61
2006	World Cross Country Championships	Fukuoka, Japan	2nd	Junior race (6 km)	19:27
2006	World Junior Championships	Beijing, China	1st	3000 m	9:02.90
2007	World Cross Country Championships	Mombasa, Kenya	3rd	Junior race (6 km)	21:10
2007	All-Africa Games	Algiers, Algeria	2nd	1500 m	4:09.11
2007	World Championships	Algiers, Algeria	22nd (sf)	1500 m	4:21.50
2008	African Championships	Addis Ababa, Ethiopia	5th	5000 m	15:53.55
2008	Olympic Games	Beijing, China	41st (h)	3000 m s'chase	10:01.69
2012	African Championships	Porto-Novo, Benin	2nd	5000 m	15:40.65

=== Personal bests ===
- 1500 metres – 4:08.21 min (2006)
- 3000 metres – 8:52.9 min (2005)
- 5000 metres – 15:13.1 min (2005)

=== Awards ===
In the 2005 Kenyan Sports Personality of the Year awards, Wanjiru was selected the most promising sportswoman of the year. She finished third at the sportswoman of the year category, behind Catherine Ndereba and the boxer Conjestina Achieng.
