= 2018 Chicago Marathon =

Foot race in Chicago, Illinois

41st Chicago Marathon
- Venue: Chicago, United States
- Date: October 7, 2018

Champions
- Men: Mo Farah (Elite); Daniel Romanchuk (Wheelchair)
- Women: Brigid Kosgei (Elite); Manuela Schär (Wheelchair)

The 2018 Chicago Marathon was the 41st edition of the Chicago Marathon, an annual marathon race that is held in Chicago, Illinois, United States. The race took place on the morning of October 7, 2018 in wet conditions, with a total of 44,584 runners completing. Britain's Mo Farah won the men's race, having gapped second placed Mosinet Geremew towards the end of the race, to take his only World Marathon Major win, in a European record time of 2:05:11. The women's race was won by Kenya's Brigid Kosgei in a personal best time of 2:18:35, nearly three minutes ahead of the next finisher. The men's wheelchair races came down to a sprint finish, which was won by Daniel Romanchuk, with Marcel Hug a second behind, while the women's race was won by Manuela Schär.

== Course ==
The marathon is defined as a race 26 miles and 385 yards (26.219 miles (42.195 km)) long by the international athletics governing body World Athletics (known as the IAAF in 2018). The 2018 course was slightly different to that run in previous years. The race started and finished in Grant Park. Before leaving the park, runners went underneath the BP Pedestrian Bridge before entering Downtown Chicago where they went along Michigan Avenue, Grand Avenue, and State Street. The course turned north onto LaSalle Street and entered Lincoln Park around mile 5, before continuing to Sheridan Road and turning back south along Broadway, passing through Boystown, Old Town, and River North. The runners crossed the Chicago River via the Wells Street Bridge before re-crossing the river heading west via the Monroe Street Bridge. The course passed through Greektown on Adams Street before turning back east in the 16th mile. The course continued down Jackson Boulevard then turned south through Little Italy and Pilsen before crossing the river again via Cermak Road. It then continued south through Chinatown before turning north just after mile 23 back towards the downtown. There was a slight uphill section after mile 26 before the course re-entered Grant Park to finish.

== Field ==
In the elite men's race, the defending champion, American Galen Rupp, had his participation announced in a May 2018 press release. Among recent results, he won the 2017 edition in a time of 2:09:20, the 2018 Prague Marathon in 2:06:07, finished second at the 2017 Boston Marathon, and third at the marathon at the 2016 Olympic Games. Brit Mo Farah, who had run a personal best of 2:06:21 at the London Marathon in April, had his participation announced in a press release in June. Race director Carey Pinkowski called Farah and Rupp "two of the greatest distance runners of all time". The press release also announced the reintroduction of pacemakers into the race. Previous champions Dickson Chumba and Abel Kirui were announced in another press release published in August. Chumba ran a personal best of 2:04:32 at the 2014 Chicago Marathon and won the race in 2015. Kirui won the race in 2016, held a personal best of 2:05:04 and had run 2:05:30 to win the 2018 Tokyo Marathon. Other participants included Ethiopians Mosinet Geremew and Birhanu Legese who achieved personal bests of 2:04:00 and 2:04:15, respectively, at the 2018 Dubai Marathon, Kenyans Kenneth Kipkemoi, Paul Lonyangata, Geoffrey Kirui, Bedan Karoki, Stephen Sambu, and Augustine Choge, and Japanese runners Yuki Kawauchi, Suguru Osako, and Ryo Kiname.

In the May 2018 press release, the participation of American Jordan Hasay, the first runner in the elite women's field, was announced. She had debuted at the 2017 Boston Marathon, finishing in a time of 2:23:00 and improved on this time to finish third at the 2017 Chicago Marathon in 2:20:57. She was joined by Americans Amy Cragg, who held a personal best of 2:21:42 set at the 2018 Tokyo Marathon, and Laura Thweatt, announced in a press release in July. However, in September, both Hasay and Cragg withdrew with Hasay citing a stress fracture in her heel bone. The rest of the field was announced in the August press release. Ethiopian Roza Dereje held the fastest personal best, a time of 2:19:17 set at the 2018 Dubai Marathon. The race was to be her first World Marathon Major race. She was joined by fellow Ethiopian and sub-2:20 runner Birhane Dibaba, who had finished third at both the 2014 and 2015 Chicago Marathon. Kenyan Brigid Kosgei had finished second at the 2017 Chicago Marathon in 2:20:22 and had set a personal best of 2:20:13 at the London Marathon in April, the third fastest personal best in the field. Other runners included Ethiopian Shure Demise, Japanese runner Yuka Ando, and Mexican Madai Perez.

The field for the wheelchair races was announced on September 18, 2018. The fourth fastest in the women's field, Tatyana McFadden returned to attempt to win her eighth consecutive Chicago Marathon victory and to defend her course record of 1:39:15. The race was to be "hotly contested" by McFadden and the likes of the Swiss Manuela Schär, Americans Amanda McGrory and Susannah Scaroni, and Australian Madison de Rozario. Schär held the fastest personal best in the field; she won the 2017 Boston Marathon in 1:28:17, nearly five minutes ahead of the second fastest personal best in the field, held by McGrory. Between them, McFadden and McGrory had won every Chicago Marathon since 2007. De Rozario had moved to marathon racing the previous year and had managed a fourth-placed finish in Chicago in a time of 1:39:22. Also in the field were Switzerland's Sandra Graf, Netherlands' Margriet van den Broek, Americans Katrina Gerhard and Arielle Rausin and Brazilian Aline Rocha. The previous year's race was "dominated" by Marcel Hug, who returned to defend his title. Hug had most recently won in Boston and finished second in London, and with a personal best of 1:18:04, he was the fastest in the field. Australian Kurt Fearnley, a "veteran" of the discipline, joined Hug. He had won the Chicago Marathon five times between 2007 and 2015 and had most recently finished fourth in Tokyo and fifth in London. With a personal best of 1:18:51, he was the third fastest in the field. The British seven-time London Marathon winner David Weir was debuting in Chicago while four-time Chicago Marathon winner Josh George was returning, having not won since 2014. Others in the field included the Canadian Josh Cassidy, who held the second fastest personal best in the field, Americans Daniel Romanchuk and Aaron Pike, Spaniards Rafael Botello and Jordi Madera, and Japan's Hiroki Nishida and Ryota Yoshida. The wheelchair field was described as "internationally diverse" and "very competitive".

== Change to Qualifying Times ==
In 2018, the Chicago Marathon changed the qualifying times runners could use to earn guaranteed entry.

Until 2014, registration was handled on a first come, first served basis. Starting with the 2014 race, runners could either enter the lottery for a chance to participate or earn guaranteed entry through a variety of methods. One method was to run a qualifying time of 3:15 for men or 3:45 for women.

Beginning with the 2018 race, different qualifying times were used for different age groups. The qualifying times, in place from 2018 to 2024, were:

| Age Group | Men | Women |
|---|---|---|
| 16-29 | 3:10:00 | 3:40:00 |
| 30-39 | 3:15:00 | 3:45:00 |
| 40-49 | 3:25:00 | 3:55:00 |
| 50-59 | 3:40:00 | 4:15:00 |
| 60-69 | 4:00:00 | 4:55:00 |
| 70-79 | 4:30:00 | 5:45:00 |
| 80 and Over | 5:10:00 | 6:30:00 |

As a result of these changes, it was slightly more difficult for younger runners gain entry into the marathon, but it was easier for older runners to gain entry. The net impact was that the total number of runners who qualified for guaranteed entry increased significantly from 2017 to 2018.

== Summary ==
The race took place on Sunday, October 7, 2018. The wheelchair men's race started at 7:20 a.m., the wheelchair women's race one minute later with the first wave of runners at 7:30 a.m. There was a 30% chance of rain, temperatures of 60 °F (16 °C) with humidity at 87%, described as "high" by the Chicago Tribune. There were 20 aid stations along the course. The IAAF post-race report noted that it had rained prior to the race, leaving a "sheen of water on the streets", with the rain returning "briefly" during the race. A total of 44,584 runners, comprising 23,934 men and 20,650 women, finished the race, with an average time of 4:34:01.

Romanchuk won the men's wheelchair race in 1:31:34 with Hug finishing a second behind. Weir finished third in 1:31:43. The three had led together for much of the race before Weir was dropped with about 200 metres (660 ft) to go before the other two competed for the win in a "terrific sprint finish". Schär won the women's wheelchair race in a time of 1:41:38, with de Rozario in second and Scaroni in third in 1:43:16 and 1:44:48, respectively.

The elite men's race started with a 5 kilometres (3.1 mi) of 14:52 before a lead pack of 14 went through 10 kilometres (6.2 mi) in 30:10 accompanied by two pacemakers. The group was reduced to 13 by the halfway point, which they passed in 1:03:03. Just after the 30 kilometres (19 mi) mark, following a "scorching" 4:29 19th mile, the pack began to break up, with Karoki, Abel Kirui, Kipkemoi, Geoffrey Kirui, Geremew, Legese, Farah, Rupp, and Osako still present. Abel Kirui was the next to drop before a move by Kipkemoi dropped Karoki, Legese, then Rupp. Nearly 1:56 into the race, Farah and Geremew broke away from the others. At 2:03:35, Farah gapped Geremew and held his lead to the line, winning in a time of 2:05:11, a European record and his only World Marathon Major win. Geremew crossed the line in 2:05:24 with Osako coming third in an Asian record of 2:05:50, an achievement which earned him ¥100 million (equivalent to $879,000 in 2018) through a marathon development project by the National Corporate Federation of Japan. Kipkemoi and Rupp finished fourth and fifth in times of 2:05:57 and 2:06:21, respectively.

The women's race set off at a "brisk tempo", passing through the first 5 kilometres (3.1 mi) in 16:47. The leading group consisted of Kosgei, Kiplagat, Demise, Dibaba, Dereje, and Veronica Nyaruai, which went through 10 kilometres (6.2 mi) in 33:24, before Nyaruai dropped off the pace at 15 kilometres (9.3 mi). After passing through the halfway mark in 1:10:09, Kosgei made a move about 30 kilometres (19 mi) in, dropping Kiplagat and Birhane, and building a lead of 45 seconds over second-placed Dereje, a lead which grew to two minutes by 40 kilometres (25 mi). Kosgei went on to win the race in 2:18:35, a personal best of 1:38. Dereje finished second in 2:21:18 and Demise in third in 2:22:15. Nearly four minutes behind her was Kiplagat, who finished fourth in 2:26:08.

== Results ==
The results were as follows.

=== Men ===
Men's top-10
| Position | Athlete | Nationality | Time |
|---|---|---|---|
| 1st place, gold medalist(s) | Mo Farah | Great Britain | 2:05:11 |
| 2nd place, silver medalist(s) | Mosinet Geremew | Ethiopia | 2:05:24 |
| 3rd place, bronze medalist(s) | Suguru Osako | Japan | 2:05:50 |
| 4 | Kenneth Kipkemoi | Kenya | 2:05:57 |
| 5 | Galen Rupp | United States | 2:06:21 |
| 6 | Geoffrey Kirui | Kenya | 2:06:45 |
| 7 | Abel Kirui | Kenya | 2:07:52 |
| 8 | Taku Fujimoto | Japan | 2:07:57 |
| 9 | Bedan Karoki | Kenya | 2:07:59 |
| 10 | Birhanu Legese | Ethiopia | 2:08:41 |

=== Women ===
Women's top-10
| Position | Athlete | Nationality | Time |
|---|---|---|---|
| 1st place, gold medalist(s) | Brigid Kosgei | Kenya | 2:18:35 |
| 2nd place, silver medalist(s) | Roza Dereje | Ethiopia | 2:21:18 |
| 3rd place, bronze medalist(s) | Shure Demise | Ethiopia | 2:22:15 |
| 4 | Florence Kiplagat | Kenya | 2:26:08 |
| 5 | Veronicah Nyaruai | Kenya | 2:31:34 |
| 6 | Sarah Crouch | United States | 2:32:37 |
| 7 | Taylor Ward | United States | 2:32:42 |
| 8 | Kate Landau | United States | 2:33:24 |
| 9 | Melanie Myrand | Canada | 2:34:08 |
| 10 | Marci Klimek | United States | 2:34:53 |

=== Wheelchair men ===
Wheelchair men's top-3
| Position | Athlete | Nationality | Time |
|---|---|---|---|
| 1st place, gold medalist(s) | Daniel Romanchuk | United States | 1:31:34 |
| 2nd place, silver medalist(s) | Marcel Hug | Switzerland | 1:31:35 |
| 3rd place, bronze medalist(s) | David Weir | Great Britain | 1:31:43 |

=== Wheelchair women ===
Wheelchair women's top-3
| Position | Athlete | Nationality | Time |
|---|---|---|---|
| 1st place, gold medalist(s) | Manuela Schär | Switzerland | 1:41:38 |
| 2nd place, silver medalist(s) | Madison de Rozario | Australia | 1:43:16 |
| 3rd place, bronze medalist(s) | Susannah Scaroni | United States | 1:44:48 |
