= List of final standings of the World Marathon Majors =

This page lists the final standings of the World Marathon Majors (and current standings of latest series), which was founded in 2006 and is made up of six annual races: the Boston Marathon, London Marathon, Berlin Marathon, Chicago Marathon, New York City Marathon and Tokyo Marathon (which was added to the World Marathon Majors in 2013). The New York City Marathon was cancelled in 2012, and consequently is not included for the 2011–12 or 2012–13 seasons. In years where the World Athletics Championships or Olympic Games are contested, the marathon at the respective event is also included.

Each World Marathon Majors series originally spanned two full calendar years; the second year of a series overlapped with the first year of the next. Starting in 2015, each series began with a defined city race and ended with the following race in the same city. So, series IX started in February 2015 at the 2015 Tokyo Marathon and ended there in February 2016 at the 2016 Tokyo Marathon. Series X started at the 2016 Boston Marathon and finished at the 2017 Boston Marathon. Series XI started at the 2017 London Marathon and finished at the 2018 London Marathon.

== Winners by season ==
The winners by season listed below.

=== Men's series winners ===
Season	No.	Start event	Final event	Winner	Country	Points	Notes	Ref
2006–07	I	2006 Boston	2007 New York City	Robert Kipkoech Cheruiyot	Kenya	80 points		
2007–08	II	2007 Boston	2008 New York City	Martin Lel	Kenya	76 points		
2008–09	III	2008 Boston	2009 New York City	Samuel Wanjiru	Kenya	80 points		
2009–10	IV	2009 Boston	2010 New York City	Samuel Wanjiru (2)	Kenya	75 points		
2010–11	V	2010 Boston	2011 New York City	Emmanuel Mutai	Kenya	70 points		
2011–12	VI	2011 Boston	2012 Chicago	Geoffrey Mutai	Kenya	75 points		
2012–13	VII	2012 Boston	2013 New York City	Tsegaye Kebede	Ethiopia	75 points		
2013–14	VIII	2013 Tokyo	2014 New York City	Wilson Kipsang	Kenya	76 points		
2015–16	IX	2015 Tokyo	2016 Tokyo	Eliud Kipchoge	Kenya	50 points		
2016–17	X	2016 Boston	2017 Boston	Eliud Kipchoge (2)	Kenya	50 points		
2017–18	XI	2017 London	2018 London	Eliud Kipchoge (3)	Kenya	50 points		
2018–19	XII	2018 Berlin	2019 Berlin	Eliud Kipchoge (4)	Kenya	50 points		
2019–21	XIII	2019 Chicago	2021 New York City	Albert Korir	Kenya	41 points		
2022	XIV	2021 Tokyo (Note: Ran in 2022 due to COVID-19 pandemic)	2022 New York City	Eliud Kipchoge (5)	Kenya	50 points		
2023	XV	2023 Tokyo	2023 New York City	Kelvin Kiptum	Kenya	50 points		
2024	XVI	2024 Tokyo	2024 New York City	Benson Kipruto	Kenya	34 points		
2025	XVII	2025 Tokyo	2025 New York City	Sabastian Sawe	Kenya	50 points		

=== Women's series winners ===
Season	No.	Start event	Final event	Winner	Country	Points	Notes	Ref
2006–07	I	2006 Boston	2007 New York City	Gete Wami	Ethiopia	80 points		
2007–08	II	2007 Boston	2008 New York City	Irina Mikitenko	Germany	65 points	Tied with Gete Wami; but deemed winner by race directors' vote	
2008–09	III	2008 Boston	2009 New York City	Irina Mikitenko (2)	Germany	90 points		
2009–10	IV	2009 Boston	2010 New York City	Irina Mikitenko (3)	Germany	55 points	Awarded after a doping case against original winner (Note: Liliya Shobukhova (Russia) was the original winner in Series IV and V but she was disqualified from competition for a doping violation in April 2014 and all her results from 9 October 2009 have been annulled.)	
2010–11	V	2010 Boston	2011 New York City	Edna Kiplagat	Kenya	60 points	Awarded after a doping case against original winner	
2011–12	VI	2011 Boston	2012 Chicago	Mary Keitany	Kenya	65 points		
2012–13	VII	2012 Boston	2013 New York City	Priscah Jeptoo	Kenya	75 points		
2013–14	VIII	2013 Tokyo	2014 New York City	Edna Kiplagat (2)	Kenya	65 points	Awarded after a doping case against original winner (Note: Rita Jeptoo (Kenya) won four races in the 2013–14 series but gave positive A and B samples in an out-of-competition test in September 2014.)	
2015–16	IX	2015 Tokyo	2016 Tokyo	Mary Keitany (2)	Kenya	41 points	Tied with Mare Dibaba & Helah Kiprop; winner by race directors' vote	
2016–17	X	2016 Boston	2017 Boston	Edna Kiplagat (3)	Kenya	41 points	Awarded after a doping case against original winner (Note: Jemima Sumgong (Kenya), who won two races in 2016 but gave a positive sample in an out-of-competition test in February 2017.)	
2017–18	XI	2017 London	2018 London	Mary Keitany (3)	Kenya	41 points	Winner due to better head-to-head record versus Tirunesh Dibaba	
2018–19	XII	2018 Berlin	2019 Berlin	Brigid Kosgei	Kenya	50 points		
2019–21	XIII	2019 Chicago	2021 New York City	Peres Jepchirchir; Joyciline Jepkosgei	Kenya; Kenya	50 points	Joint champions with two wins each	
2022	XIV	2021 Tokyo	2022 New York City	Gotytom Gebreslase	Ethiopia			
2023	XV	2023 Tokyo	2023 New York City	Sifan Hassan	Netherlands	50 points	Tied with Hellen Obiri; winner by race directors' vote	
2024	XVI	2024 Tokyo	2024 New York City	Hellen Obiri	Kenya	41 points	Tied with Sutume Asefa Kebede; winner by race directors' vote	
2025	XVII	2025 Tokyo	2025 New York City	Hellen Obiri (2); Sharon Lokedi; Tigst Assefa	Kenya; Kenya; Ethiopia	41 points	Race directors decided they should share the title	

=== Men's wheelchair series winners ===
Season	No.	Start event	Final event	Winner	Country	Points	Notes	Ref
2016–17	X	2016 Boston	2017 Boston	Marcel Hug	Switzerland			
2017–18	XI	2017 London	2018 London	Marcel Hug (2)	Switzerland			
2018–19	XII	2018 Berlin	2019 Berlin	Daniel Romanchuk	United States			
2019–21	XIII	2019 Chicago	2021 New York City	Marcel Hug (3)	Switzerland			
2022	XIV	2021 Tokyo	2022 New York City	Marcel Hug (4)	Switzerland			
2023	XV	2023 Tokyo	2023 New York City	Marcel Hug (5)	Switzerland			
2024	XVI	2024 Tokyo	2024 New York City	Marcel Hug (6)	Switzerland			
2025	XVII	2025 Tokyo	2025 New York City	Marcel Hug (7)	Switzerland			

=== Women's wheelchair series winners ===
Season	No.	Start event	Final event	Winner	Country	Points	Notes	Ref
2016–17	X	2016 Boston	2017 Boston	Tatyana McFadden	United States			
2017–18	XI	2017 London	2018 London	Manuela Schär	Switzerland			
2018–19	XII	2018 Berlin	2019 Berlin	Manuela Schär (2)	Switzerland			
2019–21	XIII	2019 Chicago	2021 New York City	Manuela Schär (3)	Switzerland			
2022	XIV	2021 Tokyo	2022 New York City	Susannah Scaroni	United States			
2023	XV	2023 Tokyo	2023 New York City	Catherine Debrunner	Switzerland			
2024	XVI	2024 Tokyo	2024 New York City	Catherine Debrunner (2)	Switzerland			
2025	XVII	2025 Tokyo	2025 New York City	Susannah Scaroni (2)	United States			

== Standings by season ==
The leaderboards show all top placing finishers for the given season.

Points systems

- From 2006–07 until 2013–14 points were given for 1st place: 25 points, 2nd: 15 points, 3rd: 10 points, 4th: 5 points, 5th: 1 point.
- From series IX (season 2014–15) onwards points were given for 1st place: 25 points, 2nd: 16 points, 3rd: 9 points, 4th: 4 points, 5th: 1 point.

=== 2006–07 (series I) ===
Men
Place	Name	Country	Points
1	Robert Kipkoech Cheruiyot	Kenya	80 pts
2	Martin Lel	Kenya	60 pts
3	Haile Gebrselassie	Ethiopia	50 pts
4	Felix Limo	Kenya	35 pts
5	Abderrahim Goumri	Morocco	30 pts
6	Marilson Gomes dos Santos	Brazil	25 pts
6	Stephen Kiogora	Kenya	25 pts
6	Luke Kibet	Kenya	25 pts
6	Patrick Ivuti	Kenya	25 pts
6	Daniel Njenga	Kenya	25 pts

Women
Place	Name	Country	Points
1	Gete Wami	Ethiopia	80 pts
2	Jeļena Prokopčuka	Latvia	65 pts
3	Berhane Adere	Ethiopia	55 pts
4	Zhou Chunxiu	China	40 pts
5	Catherine Ndereba	Kenya	36 pts
6	Rita Jeptoo	Kenya	35 pts
7	Lidiya Grigoryeva	Russia	31 pts
8	Deena Kastor	United States	26 pts
9	Paula Radcliffe	United Kingdom	25 pts
10	Salina Kosgei	Kenya	20 pts
10	Reiko Tosa	Japan	20 pts

=== 2007–08 (series II) ===
Men
Place	Name	Country	Points
1	Martin Lel	Kenya	76 pts
2	Robert Kipkoech Cheruiyot	Kenya	55 pts
3	Haile Gebrselassie	Ethiopia	50 pts
4	Abderrahim Goumri	Morocco	40 pts
4	Samuel Wanjiru	Kenya	40 pts
6	Jaouad Gharib	Morocco	35 pts
7	James Kwambai	Kenya	31 pts
8	Luke Kibet	Kenya	25 pts
8	Patrick Ivuti	Kenya	25 pts
8	Evans Cheruiyot	Kenya	25 pts

Women
Place	Name	Country	Points
1	Irina Mikitenko	Germany	65 pts*
2	Gete Wami	Ethiopia	65 pts
3	Lidiya Grigoryeva	Russia	55 pts
4	Zhou Chunxiu	China	50 pts
5	Catherine Ndereba	Kenya	41 pts
6	Constantina Diță	Romania	40 pts
7	Jeļena Prokopčuka	Latvia	30 pts
7	Alevtina Biktimirova	Russia	30 pts
9	Berhane Adere	Ethiopia	25 pts
9	Paula Radcliffe	United Kingdom	25 pts
9	Dire Tune	Ethiopia	25 pts

- Irina Mikitenko was named a winner by vote of WMM race directors

=== 2008–09 (series III) ===
Men
Place	Name	Country	Points
1	Samuel Wanjiru	Kenya	80 pts
2	Haile Gebrselassie	Ethiopia	50 pts
3	Robert Kipkoech Cheruiyot	Kenya	41 pts
4	Abderrahim Goumri	Morocco	25 pts
5	Tsegaye Kebede	Ethiopia	35 pts
5	Jaouad Gharib	Morocco	35 pts
7	Deriba Merga	Ethiopia	30 pts
8	Martin Lel	Kenya	26 pts
8	Emmanuel Mutai	Kenya	26 pts

Women
Place	Name	Country	Points
1	Irina Mikitenko	Germany	90 pts
2	Dire Tune	Ethiopia	40 pts
3	Lidiya Grigoryeva	Russia	35 pts
3	Liliya Shobukhova	Russia	35 pts
5	Lyudmila Petrova	Russia	31 pts
5	Salina Kosgei	Kenya	31 pts
7	Alevtina Biktimirova	Russia	30 pts
7	Constantina Diță	Romania	30 pts
7	Paula Radcliffe	United Kingdom	30 pts

=== 2009–10 (series IV) ===
Men
Place	Name	Country	Points
1	Samuel Wanjiru	Kenya	75 pts
2	Tsegaye Kebede	Ethiopia	65 pts
3	Emmanuel Mutai	Kenya	50 pts
4	Deriba Merga	Ethiopia	35 pts
5	Jaouad Gharib	Morocco	30 pts
6	Robert Kiprono Cheruiyot	Kenya	26 pts
6	Meb Keflezighi	United States	26 pts
6	Abel Kirui	Kenya	26 pts
9	Gebregziabher Gebremariam	Ethiopia	25 pts
9	Haile Gebrselassie	Ethiopia	25 pts
9	Patrick Makau	Kenya	25 pts

Women
Place	Name	Country	Points
1	Irina Mikitenko	Germany	55 pts
2	Salina Kosgei	Kenya	36 pts
3	Teyba Erkesso	Ethiopia	35 pts
3	Aselefech Mergia	Ethiopia	35 pts
3	Bezunesh Bekele	Ethiopia	35 pts
6	Xue Bai	China	26 pts
7	Aberu Kebede	Ethiopia	25 pts
7	Edna Kiplagat	Kenya	25 pts
7	Atsede Baysa	Ethiopia	25 pts
7	Derartu Tulu	Ethiopia	25 pts

- Liliya Shobukhova from Russia (initially 85 pts) was disqualified due to the doping case.

=== 2010–11 (series V) ===
Men
Place	Name	Country	Points
1	Emmanuel Mutai	Kenya	70 pts
2	Geoffrey Mutai	Kenya	65 pts
3	Patrick Makau	Kenya	60 pts
4	Tsegaye Kebede	Ethiopia	51 pts
5	Gebre Gebremariam	Ethiopia	40 pts
5	Moses Mosop	Kenya	40 pts
7	Abel Kirui	Kenya	26 pts
8	Robert Kiprono Cheruiyot	Kenya	25 pts
8	Samuel Wanjiru	Kenya	25 pts
10	Wesley Korir	Kenya	20 pts
10	Feyisa Lilesa	Ethiopia	20 pts

Women
Place	Name	Country	Points
1	Edna Kiplagat	Kenya	60 pts
2	Mary Keitany	Kenya	45 pts
3	Bezunesh Bekele	Ethiopia	30 pts
4	Firehiwot Dado	Ethiopia	25 pts
4	Teyba Erkesso	Ethiopia	25 pts
4	Aberu Kebede	Ethiopia	25 pts
4	Caroline Kilel	Kenya	25 pts
4	Florence Kiplagat	Kenya	25 pts
9	Desiree Davila	United States	20 pts
9	Sharon Cherop	Kenya	20 pts
9	Inga Abitova	Russia	20 pts

- Liliya Shobukhova from Russia (initially 90 pts) was disqualified due to the doping case.

=== 2011–12 (series VI) ===
Men
Place	Name	Country	Points
1	Geoffrey Mutai	Kenya	75 pts
2	Tsegaye Kebede	Ethiopia	46 pts
3	Wesley Korir	Kenya	41 pts
4	Abel Kirui	Kenya	40 pts
4	Moses Mosop	Kenya	40 pts
4	Emmanuel Mutai	Kenya	40 pts
7	Wilson Kipsang	Kenya	35 pts
7	Patrick Makau	Kenya	35 pts
9	Martin Lel	Kenya	30 pts
10	Stephen Kiprotich	Uganda	25 pts
10	Feyisa Lelisa	Ethiopia	25 pts

Women
Place	Name	Country	Points
1	Mary Keitany	Kenya	65 pts
2	Edna Kiplagat	Kenya	55 pts
3	Sharon Cherop	Kenya	45 pts
4	Priscah Jeptoo	Kenya	40 pts
5	Firehiwot Dado	Ethiopia	30 pts
5	Florence Kiplagat	Kenya	30 pts
5	Atsede Baysa	Ethiopia	30 pts
8	Tiki Gelana	Ethiopia	25 pts
8	Aberu Kebede	Ethiopia	25 pts
8	Caroline Kilel	Kenya	25 pts

=== 2012–13 (series VII) ===
Men
Place	Name	Country	Points
1	Tsegaye Kebede	Ethiopia	75 pts
2	Wilson Kipsang	Kenya	61 pts
3	Stephen Kiprotich	Uganda	50 pts
3	Geoffrey Mutai	Kenya	50 pts
5	Lelisa Desisa	Ethiopia	40 pts
5	Dennis Kimetto	Kenya	40 pts
7	Sammy Kitwara	Kenya	30 pts
7	Emmanuel Mutai	Kenya	30 pts
9	Wesley Korir	Kenya	27 pts
10	Micah Kogo	Kenya	20 pts
10	Feyisa Lilesa	Ethiopia	20 pts

Women
Place	Name	Country	Points
1	Priscah Jeptoo	Kenya	75 pts
2	Rita Jeptoo	Kenya	65 pts
3	Edna Kiplagat	Kenya	55 pts
4	Sharon Cherop	Kenya	50 pts
5	Atsede Baysa	Ethiopia	31 pts
6	Jemima Jelagat Sumgong	Kenya	30 pts
6	Mary Keitany	Kenya	30 pts
6	Florence Kiplagat	Kenya	30 pts
9	Tiki Gelana	Ethiopia	25 pts
9	Aberu Kebede	Ethiopia	25 pts

=== 2013–14 (series VIII) ===
Men
Place	Name	Country	Points
1	Wilson Kipsang	Kenya	76 pts
2	Dennis Kimetto	Kenya	75 pts
3	Lelisa Desisa	Ethiopia	55 pts
3	Tsegaye Kebede	Ethiopia	55 pts
5	Emmanuel Mutai	Kenya	45 pts
6	Eliud Kipchoge	Kenya	40 pts
7	Sammy Kitwara	Kenya	35 pts
7	Dickson Chumba	Kenya	35 pts
9	Meb Keflezighi	United States	30 pts
10	Stephen Kiprotich	Uganda	25 pts
10	Geoffrey Mutai	Kenya	25 pts
10	Tadese Tola	Ethiopia	25 pts

Women
Place	Name	Country	Points
1	Edna Kiplagat	Kenya	65 pts
2	Florence Kiplagat	Kenya	55 pts
3	Tirfi Tsegaye	Ethiopia	51 pts
4	Priscah Jeptoo	Kenya	50 pts
5	Jemima Jelagat Sumgong	Kenya	35 pts
5	Mare Dibaba	Ethiopia	35 pts
7	Buzunesh Deba	Ethiopia	30 pts
8	Aberu Kebede	Ethiopia	26 pts
9	Birhane Dibaba	Ethiopia	25 pts
9	Mary Keitany	Kenya	25 pts
9	Sharon Cherop	Kenya	25 pts

- Rita Jeptoo (Kenya) was removed because of a September 2014 doping violation.

=== 2015–16 (series IX) ===
Men
Place	Name	Country	Points
1	Eliud Kipchoge	Kenya	50 pts
2	Dickson Chumba	Kenya	34 pts
2	Lelisa Desisa	Ethiopia	34 pts
2	Feyisa Lelisa	Ethiopia	34 pts
5	Yemane Tsegay	Ethiopia	32 pts
6	Stanley Biwott	Kenya	29 pts
7	Ghirmay Ghebreslassie	Eritrea	25 pts
7	Endeshaw Negesse	Ethiopia	25 pts
9	Stephen Kiprotich	Uganda	20 pts
9	Wilson Kipsang	Kenya	20 pts
9	Bernard Kipyego	Kenya	20 pts

Women
Place	Name	Country	Points
1	Mary Keitany	Kenya	41 pts *
1	Mare Dibaba	Ethiopia	41 pts
1	Helah Kiprop	Kenya	41 pts
4	Tigist Tufa	Ethiopia	34 pts
4	Birhane Dibaba	Ethiopia	34 pts
6	Florence Kiplagat	Kenya	26 pts
7	Gladys Cherono	Kenya	25 pts
7	Caroline Rotich	Kenya	25 pts
9	Aberu Kebede	Ethiopia	20 pts
9	Aselefech Mergia	Ethiopia	20 pts

- Mary Keitany was named a winner by vote of WMM race directors

=== 2016–17 (series X) ===
Men
Place	Name	Country	Points
1	Eliud Kipchoge	Kenya	50 pts
2	Wilson Kipsang	Kenya	41 pts
3	Kenenisa Bekele	Ethiopia	34 pts
4	Ghirmay Ghebreslassie	Eritrea	29 pts
5	Abel Kirui	Kenya	25 pts
6	Dickson Chumba	Kenya	25 pts
7	Galen Rupp	United States	25 pts
8	Gideon Kipketer	Kenya	25 pts
9	Lemi Berhanu Hayle	Ethiopia	25 pts
10	Feyisa Lilesa	Ethiopia	16 pts

Women
Place	Name	Country	Points
1	Edna Kiplagat	Kenya	41 pts
2	Florence Kiplagat	Kenya	34 pts
3	Birhane Dibaba	Ethiopia	32 pts
4	Aberu Kebede	Ethiopia	25 pts
5	Atsede Baysa	Ethiopia	25 pts
6	Mary Keitany	Kenya	25 pts
7	Sarah Chepchirchir	Kenya	25 pts
8	Tirfi Tsegaye	Ethiopia	20 pts
9	Eunice Jepkirui Kirwa	Bahrain	16 pts
10	Lelisa Desisa	Ethiopia	16 pts

=== 2017–18 (series XI) ===
Men
Place	Name	Country	Points
1	Eliud Kipchoge	Kenya	50 pts
2	Geoffrey Kirui	Kenya	41 pts
3	Yuki Kawauchi	Japan	25 pts *
4	Daniel Wanjiru	Kenya	25 pts
5	Dickson Chumba	Kenya	25 pts
6	Galen Rupp	United States	25 pts
7	Geoffrey Kamworor	Kenya	25 pts
8	Abel Kirui	Kenya	20 pts
9	Guye Adola	Ethiopia	16 pts
10	Kenenisa Bekele	Ethiopia	16 pts

Women
Place	Name	Country	Points
1	Mary Keitany	Kenya	41 pts *
2	Tirunesh Dibaba	Ethiopia	41 pts
3	Brigid Kosgei	Kenya	32 pts *
4	Ruti Aga	Ethiopia	32 pts
5	Vivian Cheruiyot	Kenya	29 pts
6	Birhane Dibaba	Ethiopia	25 pts
7	Desiree Linden	United States	25 pts
8	Rose Chelimo	Bahrain	25 pts
9	Shalane Flanagan	United States	25 pts
10	Edna Kiplagat	Kenya	20 pts

- Mary Keitany awarded first place over Tirunesh Dibaba because of better head-to-head record.
- Yuki Kawauchi and Brigid Kosgei were awarded third place on a race director's vote.

=== 2018–19 (series XII) ===
Men
Place	Name	Country	Points
1	Eliud Kipchoge	Kenya	50 pts
2	Lelisa Desisa	Ethiopia	41 pts *
3	Birhanu Legese	Ethiopia	41 pts
4	Mosinet Geremew	Ethiopia	32 pts
5	Mo Farah	United Kingdom	26 pts
6	Lawrence Cherono	Kenya	25 pts
7	Tola Shura Kitata	Ethiopia	20 pts
8	Amos Kipruto	Kenya	16 pts
9	Bedan Karoki	Kenya	16 pts
10	Kenneth Kipkemoi	Kenya	13 pts

Women
Place	Name	Country	Points
1	Brigid Kosgei	Kenya	50 pts
2	Ruti Aga	Ethiopia	41 pts
3	Vivian Cheruiyot	Kenya	32 pts
4	Gladys Cherono	Kenya	29 pts
5	Mary Keitany	Kenya	26 pts
6	Worknesh Degefa	Ethiopia	25 pts
7	Roza Dereje	Ethiopia	25 pts
8	Edna Kiplagat	Kenya	20 pts
9	Shure Demise	Ethiopia	18 pts
10	Helen Tola	Ethiopia	16 pts

- Lelisa Desisa was awarded second place on a race director's vote.

=== 2019–21 (series XIII) ===
Men
Place	Name	Country	Points
1	Lawrence Cherono	Kenya	29 pts
2	Bashir Abdi	Belgium	26 pts
2	Tola Shura Kitata	Ethiopia	26 pts
4	Eliud Kipchoge	Kenya	25 pts
4	Lelisa Desisa	Ethiopia	25 pts
4	Birhanu Legese	Ethiopia	25 pts
4	Geoffrey Kamworor	Kenya	25 pts
8	Mosinet Geremew	Ethiopia	20 pts
9	Sisay Lemma	Ethiopia	18 pts
10	Abdi Nageeye	Netherlands	16 pts
10	Albert Korir	Kenya	16 pts
10	Vincent Kipchumba	Kenya	16 pts
10	Dejene Debela	Ethiopia	16 pts

Women
Place	Name	Country	Points
1	Brigid Kosgei	Kenya	50 pts
1	Joyciline Jepkosgei	Kenya	50 pts
1	Peres Jepchirchir	Kenya	50 pts
4	Ruth Chepngetich	Kenya	34 pts
5	Lonah Chemtai Salpeter	Israel	26 pts
6	Sara Hall	United States	25 pts
6	Ababel Yeshaneh	Ethiopia	25 pts
6	Gotytom Gebreslase	Ethiopia	25 pts
6	Diana Kipyogei	Kenya	25 pts
10	Emma Bates	United States	20 pts

== See also ==
- List of World Athletics Label marathon races
- World Athletics Label Road Races
- World Marathon Majors
