= 2019 Chicago Marathon =

42nd edition of the event

42nd Chicago Marathon
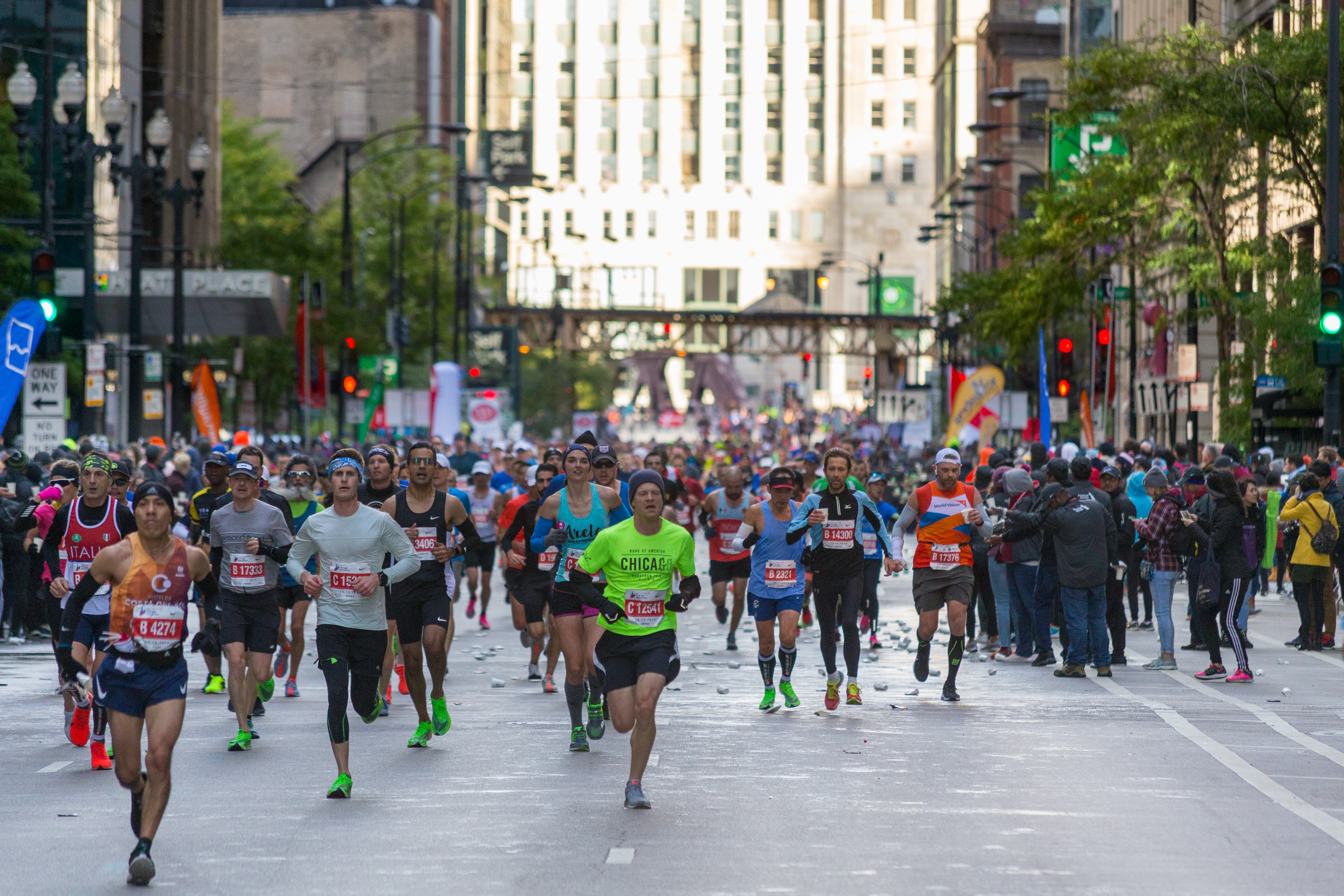
- Venue: Chicago, Illinois, United States
- Date: October 13, 2019

Champions
- Men: Lawrence Cherono (Elite); Daniel Romanchuk (Wheelchair)
- Women: Brigid Kosgei (Elite); Manuela Schär (Wheelchair)

The 2019 Chicago Marathon was the 42nd annual running of the Chicago Marathon held in Chicago, Illinois, United States on October 13, 2019. The men's race was won by Kenyan Lawrence Cherono with a time of 2:05:45 while the women's was won by Kenyan Brigid Kosgei with a time of 2:14:04, a world record by 81 seconds. The men's and women's wheelchair races were won by Daniel Romanchuk and Manuela Schär in 1:30:26 and 1:41:08, respectively. More than 45,000 runners completed the race.

== Course ==
The marathon distance is officially 26.219 miles (42.195 km) long as sanctioned by World Athletics. The course starts and finishes in Grant Park. Before leaving the park, the course runs underneath the BP Pedestrian Bridge before entering Downtown Chicago where the runners go along Michigan Avenue, Grand Avenue, and State Street. The course turns north onto LaSalle Street and enters Lincoln Park around mile 5. The course continues to Sheridan Road before turning back south along Broadway, passing through Boystown, Old Town, and River North. The runners cross the Chicago River via the Wells Street Bridge before re-crossing the river heading west via the Monroe Street Bridge. The course passes through Greektown on Adams Street before turning back east in the 16th mile. The course continues down Jackson Boulevard then turns south through Little Italy and Pilsen before crossing the river again via Cermak Road. The course continues south through Chinatown before turning north just after mile 23 back towards the downtown. There is a slight uphill section after mile 26 before the course re-enters Grant Park to finish.

There were 20 aid stations situated every one to two miles along the course.

== Field ==
The favorite in the women's race was Brigid Kosgei who had run a personal best of 2:18:20 at the 2019 London Marathon in April. Kosgei won the previous year and had finished either first or second in nine out of ten of the marathons in her career. In the initial field, only three other women had run sub-2:25 before; 2018 Paris Marathon winner Betsy Saina, Madaí Pérez who had run 2:22:59 in 2006, and Jordan Hasay, who ran 2:20:57 in 2017. Hasay had finished third in the 2017 edition and third at the 2017 Boston Marathon, but had not competed at the 2018 Chicago Marathon or 2018 Boston Marathon due to two stress fractures in her foot. Saina ran a time of 2:22:56 to win in Paris, but had failed to finish the 2017 Tokyo Marathon or 2017 New York City Marathon. Pérez had finished fourth in 2:24:44 at the 2017 Chicago Marathon, but did not finish the 2018 Boston Marathon. Other competitors in the field included three-time Olympian Fionnuala McCormack and Amy Cragg, however, she later pulled out of the race in August due to a hamstring injury. Not long before the day of the race, Gelete Burka, who had won the 2019 Paris Marathon and had run a personal best of 2:20:45, joined the field.

In the men's race, defending champion Mo Farah returned, having run 2:05:11 in 2018 and 2:05:29 at the 2019 London Marathon in April. Galen Rupp had finished in fifth place the previous year in a time of 2:06:21 and said he "could not be more excited" to be running. Rupp had been recovering from a surgery on his left foot to treat Haglund's deformity, a congenital bump on the heel which causes problems for the Achilles tendon. The field initially featured sub-2:04 runners Getaneh Molla (who had won the 2019 Dubai Marathon in 2:03:34) and Herpasa Negasa (who finished in second place at the 2019 Dubai Marathon in 2:03:40), but they withdrew before the race. This left Lawrence Cherono as the fastest in the field, having run 2:04:06 in 2018 as well as winning four of the last five marathons he ran, including the 2019 Boston Marathon in 2:07:57. Others in the field included Asefa Mengstu, who had a personal best of 2:04:06 but had only competed in one World Marathon Major, where he finished seventh, Dickson Chumba, with a personal best of 2:04:32 and first place finishes at the 2015 Chicago Marathon and 2018 Tokyo Marathon, Seifu Tura (2:04:44 personal best), Bedan Karoki (58:42 personal best in the half-marathon), Bashir Abdi, and Dejene Debela.

In the men's wheelchair race, Daniel Romanchuk returned to defend his title, having won the 2018 New York City Marathon, and the Boston and London Marathons in 2019. Also racing were ten-time Boston winner Ernst van Dyk, who had finished fifth in Tokyo and Boston, and sixth in London in 2019, eight time London winner David Weir, and four-time Chicago winner Josh George. In the women's wheelchair race, Manuela Schär returned to defend her title, having won the last seven World Marathon Majors, most recently the 2019 Berlin Marathon in September. She faced competition from three-time Chicago winner Amanda McGrory, eight-time Chicago winner Tatyana McFadden, and 2018 London winner Madison de Rozario.

The men's wheelchair race started at 7:20 a.m. CT (UTC−5), the women's wheelchair race started one minute later, and the three waves of runners at 7:30, 8:00, and 8:35. The winners of the men and women's elite races received $100,000 each with an additional $75,000 available for a course record, and the wheelchair winners received $20,000 each with $5,000 available for a course record. The temperature at the start was around 40 °F (4 °C). The weather forecast for the race was expected to be 46 °F (8 °C), with no chance of rain and 15–25-mile-per-hour (24–40 km/h) winds, described as "near ideal conditions" by the medical director. The race was held a day after Eliud Kipchoge ran the first sub-2 hour marathon during the Ineos 1:59 Challenge in Vienna, Austria.

== Race summary ==
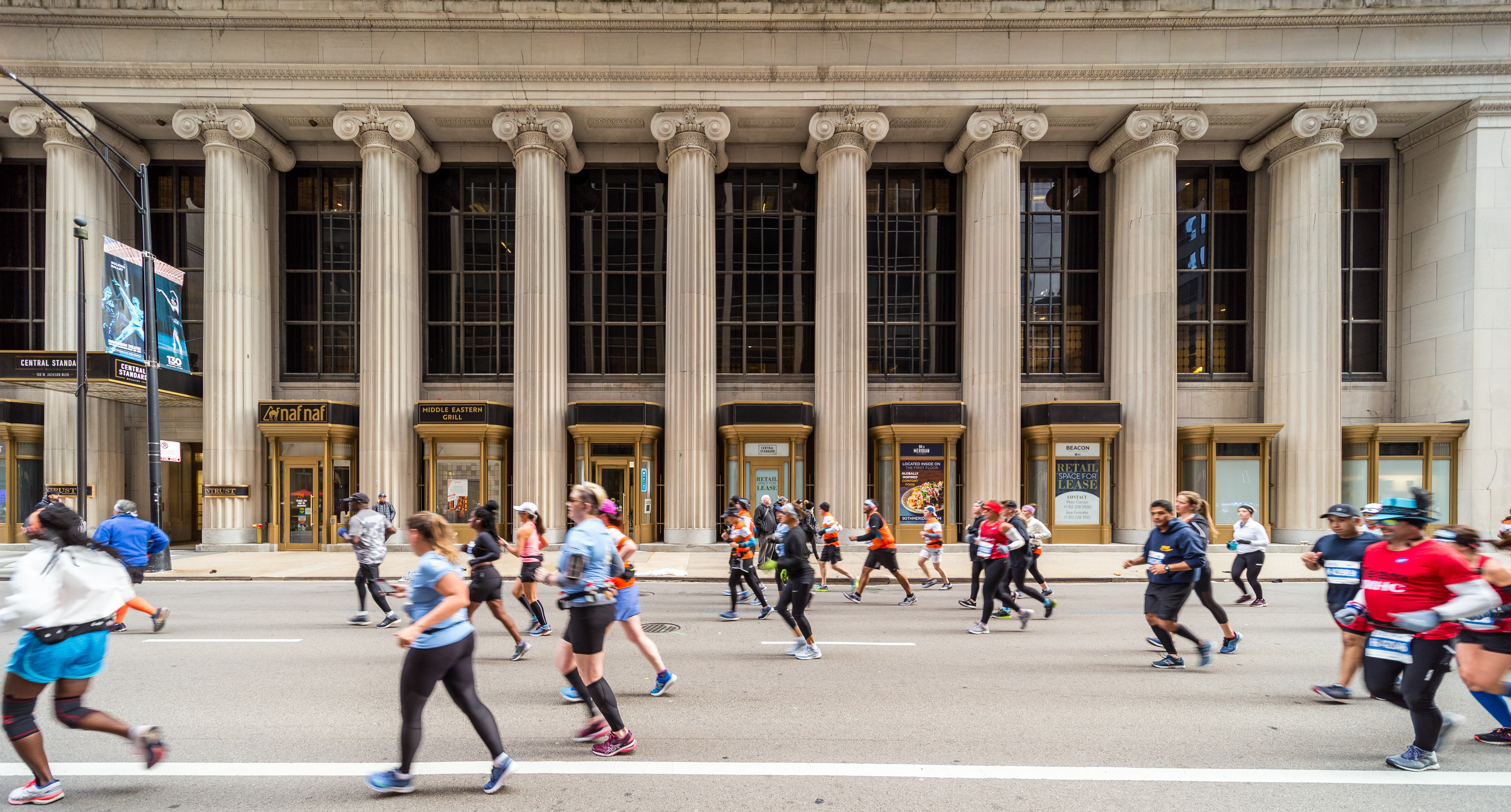
Runners pass the Continental Illinois Bank Building

In the men's wheelchair race, a large pack formed, which was together through the first half of the race. Soon after this, Romanchuk made a move and was able to break away from the pack, winning in a time of 1:30:26. The pack approached the finish three minutes later and, following a sprint finish, Weir finished second in 1:33:31, and van Dyk finished a second later in third. The women's wheelchair race was between McGrory, McFadden, Schär, and Susannah Scaroni. Schär opened up a slight gap on the rest just after the halfway mark and managed to hold her lead to win in 1:41:08. At the 40-kilometre (25 mi) mark, the other three competitors were neck-and-neck, before McGrory and McFadden left Scaroni, then McFadden left McGrory to take second place in 1:45:22. Meanwhile, Scaroni had managed to catch back up to McGrory and they both crossed the finish line in 1:45:29. A photo finish concluded that McGrory had taken third place.

In the elite women's race, Kosgei set out very fast, passing 2 miles (3.2 km) in 9:54 and 5 kilometres (3.1 mi) in 15:28 with Ababel Yeshaneh and Burka 8 and 35 seconds behind, respectively. Hasay recorded a 5-kilometre split time of 22:20, equating to a 3:08 marathon, and she pulled out before the 10-kilometre mark citing a hamstring injury. Kosgei went through 10 kilometres (6.2 mi) in 31:28 and halfway in 1:06:59, which was over a minute faster than Paula Radcliffe's halfway split during her world record run at the 2003 London Marathon. Saina, who had been running in fourth place, dropped out halfway through the race, having struggled with food poisoning on the journey to the United States from Kenya. Running behind two male pacemakers, Kosgei passed 25 kilometres (16 mi) in 1:19:33, 30 kilometres (19 mi) in 1:35:18, 35 kilometres (22 mi) in 1:51:14, 40 kilometres (25 mi) in 2:07:11 and finished in a time of 2:14:04. Kosgei beat Radcliffe's world record by 81 seconds and the course record, also set by Radcliffe in 2002, by 3:14. When she crossed the line, she was congratulated by Mayor of Chicago Lori Lightfoot and Radcliffe, who posed for a photo with her. Nearly seven minutes later, Yeshaneh and Burka finished in second and third in 2:20:51 and 2:20:55, respectively.

In the men's category, Cherono made an early breakaway, running the first mile in 4:42 with two pacemakers before he was caught by the pack. Six men, Debela, Cherono, Karoki, Mengstu, Chumba, and Tura, led for most of the race with a chasing pack close behind, however after 5 miles (8.0 km), the leading group had grown to nine runners with the addition of Abdi, Farah, and Rupp. Rupp and Farah dropped out of the lead group after 7 miles (11 km) and 15 kilometres (9.3 mi), respectively. By 20 kilometres (12 mi), the lead group was back down to the original six leaders and the pace was described by Cherono as "very competitive from the beginning" with the group going through half-way in 1:02:14 and Farah in 1:02:54 with Rupp three seconds behind before the pacemakers dropped out about 30 kilometres (19 mi) into the race. Not long after the halfway point, Rupp began to lose contact with Abdi and Farah, who were working together, but Rupp regained contact 18 miles (29 km) into the race, whilst Karoki increased the pace in the lead group. At just after 30 kilometres, Chumba dropped from the lead group and 5 kilometres later, was 34 seconds behind, with Abdi, Farah, and Rupp a further 48, 116, and 138 seconds behind, respectively. Just before 23 miles (37 km), Rupp, who was nearly 3 minutes behind the leaders and 22 seconds behind Farah, abandoned the race citing a calf strain which had been causing pain since mile 6. At 38 kilometres (24 mi), Cherono made an attempt to break from the lead group, but was caught by Debela, Mengstu, and Karoki. The other three runners left Karoki behind before the final turn of the race before Cherono made a surge with 400 metres (1,300 ft) to go to and, following a sprint finish, won in a time of 2:05:45. Debela and Mengstu finished second and third, one and three seconds behind, respectively. Karoki was fourth in 2:05:53 and Abdi ran a Belgian record by finishing fifth in 2:06:14. Farah ran his slowest marathon ever, finishing eighth in 2:09:58.

Nicholas Thompson, the editor in chief of WIRED, wrote about the race in an article titled "To Run My Best Marathon at Age 44, I Had to Outrun My Past." He finished in 2:29 as one of the top Masters men.

== Results ==
The results were as follows.

Men's results
Position	Athlete	Nationality	Time
1st place, gold medalist(s)	Lawrence Cherono	Kenya	2:05:45
2nd place, silver medalist(s)	Dejene Debela	Ethiopia	2:05:46
3rd place, bronze medalist(s)	Asefa Mengstu	Ethiopia	2:05:48
4	Bedan Karoki Muchiri	Kenya	2:05:53
5	Bashir Abdi	Belgium	2:06:14
6	Seifu Tura	Ethiopia	2:08:35
7	Dickson Chumba	Kenya	2:09:11
8	Mo Farah	United Kingdom	2:09:58
9	Jacob Riley	United States	2:10:36
10	Jerrell Mock	United States	2:10:37

Women's results
Position	Athlete	Nationality	Time
1st place, gold medalist(s)	Brigid Kosgei	Kenya	2:14:04 WR
2nd place, silver medalist(s)	Ababel Yeshaneh	Ethiopia	2:20:51
3rd place, bronze medalist(s)	Gelete Burka	Ethiopia	2:20:55
4	Emma Bates	United States	2:25:27
5	Fionnuala McCormack	Ireland	2:26:47
6	Stephanie Bruce	United States	2:27:47
7	Lindsay Flanagan	United States	2:28:08
8	Laura Thweatt	United States	2:29:06
9	Lisa Weightman	Australia	2:29:45
10	Taylor Ward	United States	2:30:14

Wheelchair men's results
Position	Athlete	Nationality	Time
1st place, gold medalist(s)	Daniel Romanchuk	United States	1:30:26
2nd place, silver medalist(s)	David Weir	Great Britain	1:33:31
3rd place, bronze medalist(s)	Ernst van Dyk	South Africa	1:33:32

Wheelchair women's result
Position	Athlete	Nationality	Time
1st place, gold medalist(s)	Manuela Schär	Switzerland	1:41:08
2nd place, silver medalist(s)	Tatyana McFadden	United States	1:45:22
3rd place, bronze medalist(s)	Amanda McGrory	United States	1:45:29
