= Sarah Crouch =

American long-distance runner

Personal information
- Born: Sarah Porter; August 22, 1989 (age 37) Hockinson, Washington, U.S.
- Height: 1.6 m (5 ft 3 in)
- Website: Sarah's initial Website sarahcrouch.com

Sport
- Country: United States
- Sport: Track, long-distance running
- Events: Marathon, Half marathon, 5000 meters, 10,000 meters
- College team: Western Washington Vikings
- Team: 361˚
- Turned pro: 2011
- Coached by: Steve Magness
- Retired: 2024

Sarah Crouch (née Porter on 22 August 1989) is a retired American long-distance runner who has represented Team USA in the marathon. Sarah Crouch is a writer who's published USA Today Best-Selling books. During her collegiate career at Western Washington University, she was an NCAA Division II All-American thirteen times and won the 2011 NCAA Division II National Championship in the 10,000m. Upon graduation, she began her professional career with ZAP-Reebok. In one of her first races as a professional runner, she finished fifth at the U.S. 10 Mile Championships. In 2011, she made her marathon debut in New York and qualified for the U.S. Olympic Marathon Trials, and in 2012, she qualified for the U.S. Olympic Track and Field Trials in the 10,000 meters.

== NCAA ==
In college, Sarah Porter was a 13-time All-American for Western Washington University. Sarah tied an NCAA record and made a school-record 12 national appearances during her four-year career – four each in cross country, indoor track and outdoor track.

== Professional ==
Crouch finished 7th at the 2014 Chicago Marathon.

Crouch finished 9th at the 2016 Chicago Marathon in 2:33:48. She finished 11th at the 2016 Boston Marathon.

Crouch previously trained in Blowing Rock, North Carolina with Zap Elite training group.

Sarah Crouch was the top American woman in Chicago at 2018 Chicago Marathon after training with her sisters, Georgia Porter (Western Colorado University alumna) & Shannon Porter (Saint Martin's University alumna) who are all sponsored by 361˚.

Sarah had a benign tumor removed from her quad in September - a few weeks before 2018 Chicago Marathon.

Year	Record	Event	Venue	Place	Time
2019	2019 Montreal Half-Marathon	Half-Marathon	Montreal	2nd	1:19:51
2018	2018 Chicago Marathon	Marathon	Chicago	6th	2:32:37
2018	Houston Marathon	Marathon	Houston	7th	2:35:22
2017	Rock 'n' Roll Marathon Series	Half Marathon	San Antonio	2nd	1:16:29
2017	Rock 'n' Roll Marathon Series	Half Marathon	Las Vegas	2nd	1:18:25
2017	2017 Chicago Marathon	Marathon	Chicago	13th	2:38:27
2017	Houston Marathon	Marathon	Houston	5th	2:38:37
2016	2016 Chicago Marathon	Marathon	Chicago	9th	2:33:48
2016	New Haven Road Race	20 km	New Haven, Connecticut	6th	1:09:06
2016	2016 Boston Marathon	Marathon	Boston	11th	2:37:36
2016	New York Half Marathon	Half Marathon	New York	13th	1:16:36
2015	2015 Chicago Marathon	Marathon	Chicago	12th	2:32:51
2015	USA Half Marathon Championships	Half Marathon	Houston	13th	1:12:51
2015	Tallahassee Marathon	Marathon	Tallahassee, Florida	1st	2:46:59
2014	Chicago Marathon	Marathon	Chicago	6th	2:32:44
2014	Bolder Boulder	10 km	Boulder, Colorado	1st	35:12
2014	Peachtree Road Race	10 km	Atlanta	14th	33:30
2013	USA Half Marathon Championships	Half Marathon	Duluth, Minnesota	12th	1:13:34
2011	2011 New York Marathon	Marathon	New York	22nd	2:44:25

== Writing career ==
'"Middletide"' by Sarah Crouch is a literary thriller set in the Pacific Northwest, focusing on Elijah Leith, a failed author who returns to his hometown only to find himself embroiled in a murder investigation after a local doctor is found dead on his property. The novel explores themes of loss, redemption, and the complexities of human relationships against a backdrop of suspense and mystery.

'"The Briars"' by Sarah Crouch is a suspenseful novel featuring Annie Heston, a game warden who moves to the small town of Lake Lumin to escape a troubled relationship. The story unfolds as she confronts a murder mystery while dealing with the challenges of her new life in a picturesque yet dangerous setting. After her marriage collapses, game warden Annie Heston flees north to the quiet mountain town of Lake Lumin, Washington, hoping the deep woods will offer her peace. She finds it—along with an unexpected connection to reclusive carpenter Daniel Barela. But when the body of a young woman surfaces in the briars along his lakeshore, Annie must rely on her wilderness instincts to hunt a killer in a small town determined to protect its own.
