= Diego Estrada (runner) =

Mexican-American long-distance runner

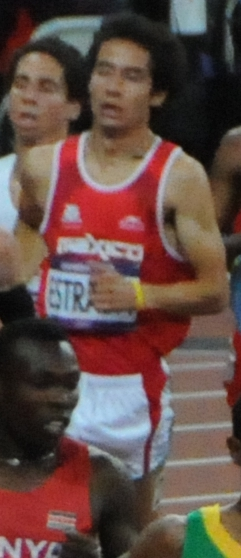
- Estrada at the 2012 Summer Olympics

Personal information
- Nationality: Mexican; American
- Born: December 19, 1989 (age 36) Michoacán, Mexico

Sport
- Sport: Track
- Events: 1500 metres, 5000 metres, 10,000 metres
- College team: Northern Arizona
- Coached by: Joe Vigil

Achievements and titles
- Personal bests: 1500 metres: 3:41.80; 5000 metres: 13:15.33; 10,000 metres: 27:30.53
- Updated on 4-29-16

Juan Diego Estrada Constantino (born 1989 in Chilchota, Michoacán) is a Mexican-American long-distance runner. He competed in the 10,000 metres at the 2012 Summer Olympics in London for Mexico. After some confusion about his eligibility after becoming a U.S. citizen, he was excluded from the U.S. Olympic trials even though it was later known that Estrada was misinformed on his eligibility possibilities. Estrada resides in Flagstaff, Arizona.

He became eligible to represent the United States internationally in May 2014.

== Running career ==
=== High school ===
Estrada attended Alisal High School (Salinas, California), for which he competed in track. In cross country he qualified three times for states, and in the outdoor track season he finished fourth in the 3200-meter, recording a high school personal-best time of 9:04.80.

=== Collegiate ===
Estrada was recruited by Northern Arizona, where he decided to major in Spanish for secondary education.

In his sophomore year with Northern Arizona University, one of his lungs collapsed, and Estrada's career was brought into question. Estrada ran NCAA regional qualifying 10K time at the Payton Jordan Stanford Cardinal Invitational (28:40.19) & NCAA regional qualifying 5K (13:49.35) in the 5K at the Mt. SAC Relays.

In his junior year, Estrada opened outdoor season with the third-fastest 1,500m time in NAU history at the Mt. SAC Relays when he crossed the finish line in 3:41.80. At the 2011 NCAA Indoor Championships, finished fourth overall in a NAU indoor-record time of 13:29.01 for first All-America award on the track.

Redshirt year, Estrada ran a personal-best time in the 10K (27:32.90) at the Payton Jordan Invitational as an unattached athlete to earn his ticket to London. He competed in front of 80,000 fans at London's Olympic Stadium on August 4 in the men's 10000 m at the 2012 Summer Olympics, finishing 21st in a time of 28:36.19.

In his senior year, Estrada finished in third place in the 5000-meter race at the 2013 NCAA D1 Outdoor T&F Championships. Estrada earned his eighth and ninth All-America honors at the 2013 NCAA Indoor Championships in record fashion with a runner-up finish in the 5,000m (13:30.24), the second-fastest all time indoors at NAU, and a fourth-place mark in the 3,000 meters (7:49.53), the third-fastest in NAU history. Estrada capped his year at the International Association of Athletics Federations 2013 World Championships in Athletics where he finished 25th in the 5000 meters semi-final while representing Mexico.

=== Post-collegiate ===
Diego Estrada is an Asics sponsored runner and coached by Joe Vigil, known for his spell with Adams State and coaching Pat Porter.

==== 2014 ====
Diego Estrada finished 1st at 2014 USA Road 5k Championships.

==== 2015 ====
Estrada won his 2nd USATF Title in Houston on January 18, 2015, by running the 7th fastest American half marathon ever in 60:51.

Diego finished 8th in the 10,000 metres in 28:36.06 at 2015 USA Outdoor Track and Field Championships. Diego came back to place 15th in 14:07.51 in the 5000 metres at 2015 USA Outdoor Track and Field Championships.

Diego Estrada finished on the podium in Providence, Rhode Island at USA Road 5 km championships on September 20 in 14:22.

Diego's half marathon is the 2015 US leading time.(subscription required) Diego is ranked second nationally in the 10,000m.

==== 2016 ====
In 2016, Diego ran the US Olympic Marathon Team Trials in February, and was in 10th place at 20 miles, but did not finish.

At the New York Road Runners New York City Half Marathon, Diego finished 5th in 1:02:15.

Estrada finished 3rd in the elite field representing USA at Bolder Boulder 10 km in 29:40 leading team USA red to a second-place team finish behind Kenya.

Diego Estrada ran a season best time on July 4 of 13:48.71 in 5000 meters to ultimately place 11th in the 5000 m final at 2016 United States Olympic Trials (track and field); after running in 10th place ~ 6 km and dropping out of the trials' 10,000 m.

==== 2017 ====
In 2017, Diego Estrada placed eighth at New York Road Runners United Airlines half-Marathon in 61:54.

Diego placed second at Bank of America Shamrock Shuffle 8K. Stephen Sambu faced off against Olympian Diego Estrada, the seventh-fastest American over the half-marathon distance.

Diego Estrada placed sixth at Payton Jordan Invitational 10,000 meters in 27:48.57.

Diego Estrada anchored his country, United States to the team win! He was 3rd American at 2017 Bolder Boulder representing ASICS America.

Estrada finished 6th at the 10,000 meters in 29:08.14 at 2017 USA Outdoor Track and Field Championships and 16th at 2017 Chicago Marathon.

=== Personal Bests ===
5000m	13:15.33	Palo Alto (USA)	28.04.2013
10,000m	27:30.53	Eugene (USA)	29.05.2015
5 km Road	13:31	Carlsbad (USA)	30.03.2014
15 km Road	43:14	Houston (USA)	18.01.2015
20 km Road	59:44	New Haven (USA)	05.09.2016
Half Marathon	1:00:49	Houston (USA)	14.01.2024
Marathon	2:13.56	Chicago (USA)	09.10.2016

- As of 22 December 2018

==== Road ====
Year	Competition	Venue	Position	Event	Notes
Representing the United States
2014	United States Road 5 km championships	Providence, Rhode Island	1st	5km	13:56.4
2015	USA Half Marathon Championships	Houston, Texas	1st	Half marathon	60:51.0
2015	United States Road 5 km championships	Providence, Rhode Island	10th	5km	14:22.0
2016	US Olympic Trials	Los Angeles, California	DNF @ 20 miles	Marathon	
2016	Bolder Boulder	Boulder, Colorado	3rd	10 km	29:40
2016	2016 Chicago Marathon	Chicago, Illinois	8th	Marathon	02:13:56
2017	Bolder Boulder	Boulder, Colorado	9th	10 km	29:58.12
2017	2017 Chicago Marathon	Chicago, Illinois	16th	Marathon	2:15:19
