= Agnieszka Mierzejewska =

Polish long-distance runner

Agnieszka Mierzejewska, née Ciołek (born 22 October 1985 in Zaklików) is a Polish long-distance runner.

At the 2016 European Athletics Championships she finished 9th in the women's half marathon.

She won the 2016 Polish national championship in the marathon, but came two minutes and four sections shy of selection to compete in the 2016 Olympics. She finished second overall in the race, but was the top finishing Pole.

She finished 8th at the 2016 Chicago Marathon.
