= 2016 Chicago Marathon =

Footrace held in Chicago, Illinois

39th Chicago Marathon
- Venue: Chicago, United States
- Date: October 9, 2016

Champions
- Men: Abel Kirui (2:11:23) (Elite); Marcel Hug (Wheelchair)
- Women: Florence Kiplagat (2:21:32) (Elite); Tatyana McFadden (Wheelchair)

The 2016 Chicago Marathon was the 39th edition of the marathon race in Chicago, Illinois, United States and was held October 9. Over 37,000 runners took part in the marathon. Florence Kiplagat of Kenya defended her women's title with a winning time of 2:21:32 hours, while her countryman Abel Kirui took the men's race in 2:11:23 hours. The top finishing Americans were Serena Burla in seventh in the women's division and Diego Estrada in eighth in the men's.

The women's wheelchair marathon was won for a sixth consecutive time by American Tatyana McFadden in 1:42:28 hours, one second clear of Manuela Schär. Marcel Hug defeated the defending champion Kurt Fearnley in the men's race with 1:32:57 hours and also a one-second margin of victory.

== Results ==
=== Men ===
| Position | Athlete | Nationality | Time |
|---|---|---|---|
| 1st place, gold medalist(s) | Abel Kirui | Kenya | 2:11:23 |
| 2nd place, silver medalist(s) | Dickson Chumba | Kenya | 2:11:26 |
| 3rd place, bronze medalist(s) | Gideon Kipketer | Kenya | 2:12:20 |
| 4 | Paul Lonyangata | Kenya | 2:13:17 |
| 5 | Stephen Sambu | Kenya | 2:13:35 |
| 6 | Abayneh Ayele | Ethiopia | 2:13:52 |
| 7 | Takuya Fukatsu | Japan | 2:13:53 |
| 8 | Diego Estrada | United States | 2:13:56 |
| 9 | Koji Gokaya | Japan | 2:14:34 |
| 10 | Elkanah Kibet | United States | 2:16:37 |

=== Women ===
| Position | Athlete | Nationality | Time |
|---|---|---|---|
| 1st place, gold medalist(s) | Florence Kiplagat | Kenya | 2:21:32 |
| 2nd place, silver medalist(s) | Edna Kiplagat | Kenya | 2:23:28 |
| 3rd place, bronze medalist(s) | Valentine Kipketer | Kenya | 2:23:41 |
| 4 | Purity Rionoripo | Kenya | 2:24:47 |
| 5 | Yebrgual Melese | Ethiopia | 2:24:49 |
| 6 | Atsede Baysa | Ethiopia | 2:28:53 |
| 7 | Serena Burla | United States | 2:30:40 |
| 8 | Agnieszka Mierzejewska | Poland | 2:32:13 |
| 9 | Sarah Crouch | United States | 2:33:48 |
| 10 | Alia Gray | United States | 2:34:00 |

=== Wheelchair men ===
| Position | Athlete | Nationality | Time |
|---|---|---|---|
| 1st place, gold medalist(s) | Marcel Hug | Switzerland | 1:32:57 |
| 2nd place, silver medalist(s) | Kurt Fearnley | Australia | 1:32:58 |
| 3rd place, bronze medalist(s) | Josh George | United States | 1:32:59 |

=== Wheelchair women ===
| Position | Athlete | Nationality | Time |
|---|---|---|---|
| 1st place, gold medalist(s) | Tatyana McFadden | United States | 1:42:28 |
| 2nd place, silver medalist(s) | Manuela Schär | Switzerland | 1:42:29 |
| 3rd place, bronze medalist(s) | Amanda McGrory | United States | 1:47:55 |
