= 2007 Berlin Marathon =

Road running event in Berlin, Germany

34th Berlin Marathon
- Venue: Berlin, Germany
- Dates: 30 September 2007

Champions
- Men: Haile Gebrselassie (2:04:26)
- Women: Gete Wami (2:23:17)

The 2007 Berlin Marathon was the 34th edition of the Berlin Marathon. The marathon took place in Berlin, Germany, on 30 September 2007 and was the fourth World Marathon Majors race of the year.

The men's race was won by Haile Gebrselassie in 2:04:26 hours and the women's race was won by Gete Wami in a time of 2:23:17 hours.

== Results ==
=== Men ===
Position	Athlete	Nationality	Time
1st place, gold medalist(s)	Haile Gebrselassie	Ethiopia	2:04:26 WR
2nd place, silver medalist(s)	Abel Kirui	Kenya	2:06:51
3rd place, bronze medalist(s)	Salim Kipsang	Kenya	2:07:29
4	Philip Kipkurgat Manyim	Kenya	2:08:01
5	Mesfin Adimasu	Ethiopia	2:09:49
6	Lee Troop	Australia	2:10:31
7	Arkadiusz Sowa	Poland	2:12:00
8	Joseph Kahugu	Kenya	2:12:08
9	Tomohiro Seto	Japan	2:12:21
10	Ignacio Cáceres	Spain	2:12:46

=== Women ===
Position	Athlete	Nationality	Time
1st place, gold medalist(s)	Gete Wami	Ethiopia	2:23:17
2nd place, silver medalist(s)	Irina Mikitenko	Germany	2:24:51
3rd place, bronze medalist(s)	Helena Kirop	Kenya	2:26:27
4	Irina Timofeyeva	Russia	2:26:54
5	Naoko Sakamoto	Japan	2:28:33
6	Hayley Haining	United Kingdom	2:30:43
7	Rose Kerubo Nyangacha	Kenya	2:31:33
8	Leonor Carneiro	Morocco	2:31:41
9	Angelina Flueckiger-Joly	Switzerland	2:35:57
10	Eva-Maria Gradwohl	Austria	2:36:26
