= Roza Dereje =

Ethiopian marathon runner (born 1997)

Roza Dereje Bekele
Personal information
- Born: 9 May 1997 (age 28)

Sport
- Country: Ethiopia
- Sport: Athletics
- Event: Long-distance running

Roza Dereje Bekele (born 9 May 1997) is an Ethiopian marathon runner.

== Career ==
In 2016 and 2017 she won the Shanghai Marathon.

In 2018, she won the Dubai Marathon in Dubai, United Arab Emirates with a time of 2:19:17 which was a new course record at the time. The following year Ruth Chepngetich set a new course record of 2:17:08.

In 2019, she finished in 3rd place in the London Marathon. In 2019, she also won the Valencia Marathon and she also set a new course record of 2:18:30. She also competed in the women's marathon at the 2019 World Athletics Championships held in Doha, Qatar. She did not finish her race.

She finished in 4th place in the women's marathon at the 2020 Summer Olympics.

== Achievements ==
Year	Competition	Venue	Position	Event	Notes
Representing Ethiopia
2016	H.C. Andersen Marathon	Odense, Denmark	1st	Marathon	2:31:16
2016	Shanghai Marathon	Shanghai, China	1st	Marathon	2:26:18
2017	Shanghai Marathon	Shanghai, China	1st	Marathon	2:22:43
2018	Dubai Marathon	Dubai, United Arab Emirates	1st	Marathon	2:19:17
2018	Chicago Marathon	Chicago, United States	2nd	Marathon	2:21:18
2019	London Marathon	London, United Kingdom	3rd	Marathon	2:20:51
2019	World Championships	Doha, Qatar	–	Marathon	DNF
2019	Valencia Marathon	Valencia, Spain	1st	Marathon	2:18:30
2021	Olympic Games	Sapporo, Japan	4th	Marathon	2:28:38
