= 2014 Chicago Marathon =

Footrace held in Chicago, Illinois

37th Chicago Marathon
- Venue: Chicago, United States
- Dates: October 12, 2014

Champions
- Men: Eliud Kipchoge (2:04:11)
- Women: Mare Dibaba (2:25:37)

The 2014 Chicago Marathon was the 37th edition of the Chicago Marathon, held in Chicago, Illinois, on Sunday, October 12. Eliud Kipchoge won the men's race in a time of 2:04:11 hours, with a winning margin of seventeen seconds. Mare Dibaba won the women's division, with a winning margin of twenty seconds. The original winner, Rita Jeptoo, was disqualified after a failed drug test.

== Changes to Registration Process ==
The Chicago Marathon made significant changes to its registration process beginning with the 2014 race. Previously, registration had been handled on a first come, first served basis.

Starting in 2014, runners could either enter a random lottery or gain guaranteed entry by running a qualifying time, raising money for a charity, traveling with an international tour operator, or as a legacy finisher.

The qualifying times were 3:15 for men and 3:45 for women. No distinctions were made for the age of the runner.

Over 70,000 runners applied for one of the 45,000 spots in the race.

== Results ==
=== Men ===
Position	Athlete	Nationality	Time
1st place, gold medalist(s)	Eliud Kipchoge	Kenya	2:04:11
2nd place, silver medalist(s)	Sammy Kitwara	Kenya	2:04:28
3rd place, bronze medalist(s)	Dickson Chumba	Kenya	2:04:32
4	Kenenisa Bekele	Ethiopia	2:05:51
5	Bernard Koech	Kenya	2:08:30
6	Ghirmay Ghebreslassie	Eritrea	2:09:08
7	Lani Rutto	Kenya	2:10:42
8	Wesley Korir	Kenya	2:11:09
9	Bobby Curtis	United States	2:11:20
10	Koji Kobayashi	Japan	2:11:43
11	Jake Riley	United States	2:13:16
12	Gabe Proctor	United States	2:13:45

=== Women ===
Position	Athlete	Nationality	Time
1st place, gold medalist(s)	Mare Dibaba	Ethiopia	2:25:37
2nd place, silver medalist(s)	Florence Kiplagat	Kenya	2:25:57
3rd place, bronze medalist(s)	Birhane Dibaba	Ethiopia	2:27:02
4	Amy Hastings	United States	2:27:03
5	Clara Santucci	United States	2:32:21
6	Sarah Crouch	United States	2:32:44
7	Gelete Burka	Ethiopia	2:34:17
8	Melissa White	United States	2:34:19
9	Lauren Jimison	United States	2:34:38
10	Sarah Cummings	United States	2:34:47
11	Lindsey Scherf	United States	2:37:26

Other notable finishers

- Lisa Uhl: 18th

=== Wheelchair men ===
Position	Athlete	Nationality	Time
1st place, gold medalist(s)	Joshua George	United States	1:32:12
2nd place, silver medalist(s)	Kurt Fearnley	Australia	1:32:13
3rd place, bronze medalist(s)	Ernst van Dyk	South Africa	1:32:13

=== Wheelchair women ===
Position	Athlete	Nationality	Time
1st place, gold medalist(s)	Tatyana McFadden	United States	1:44:50
2nd place, silver medalist(s)	Manuela Schär	Switzerland	1:45:12
3rd place, bronze medalist(s)	Amanda McGrory	United States	1:45:55
