= Brigid Kosgei =

Kenyan long-distance runner (born 1994)

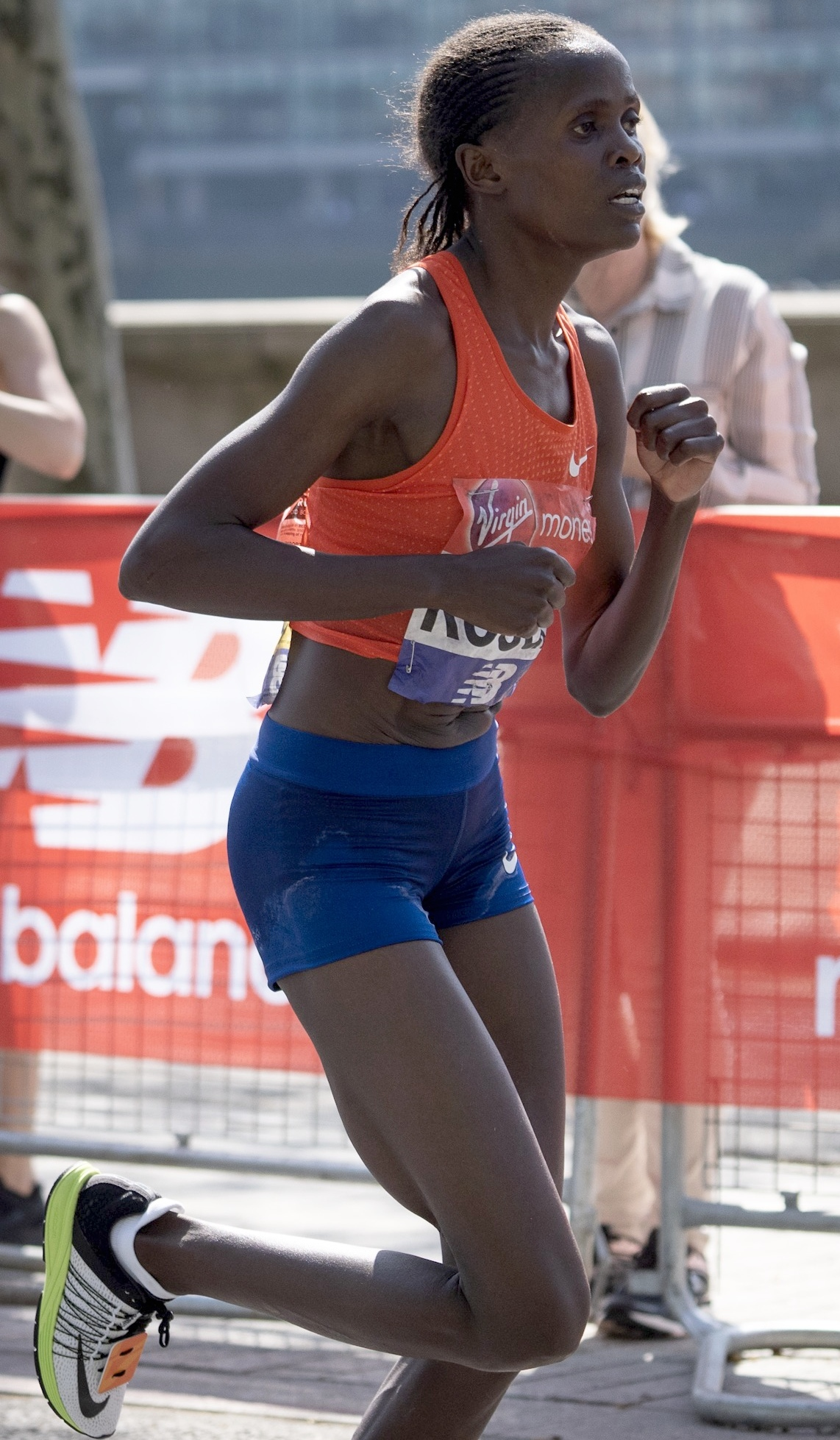
- Kosgei during the 2018 London Marathon

Personal information
- Born: 20 February 1994 (age 32) Sinon, Kapsowar, Kenya

Sport
- Sport: Athletics
- Events: Marathon; Long-distance running
- Coached by: Eric Kimaiyo

Achievements and titles
- Personal bests: Marathon: 2:14:04 WR (Chicago 2019); Half marathon: 64:49 (Ras Al Khaimah 2020)
Medal record
Marathon
Representing Kenya
Olympic Games
Silver medal – second place	2020 Tokyo	Marathon
World Marathon Majors
Gold medal – first place	2018 Chicago	Marathon
Gold medal – first place	2019 London	Marathon
Gold medal – first place	2019 Chicago	Marathon
Gold medal – first place	2020 London	Marathon
Gold medal – first place	2021 Tokyo	Marathon
Gold medal – first place	2026 Tokyo	Marathon
Silver medal – second place	2017 Chicago	Marathon
Silver medal – second place	2018 London	Marathon
Silver medal – second place	2025 Sydney	Marathon
Bronze medal – third place	2026 Chicago	Marathon

Brigid Jepchirchir Kosgei (born 20 February 1994) is a Kenyan long-distance runner who specialises in the marathon. She won the 2018 and 2019 Chicago Marathons, the 2019 and 2020 London Marathons and the 2021 and 2026 Tokyo Marathons. Kosgei was the marathon world record holder for women running in a mixed-sex race, with a time of 2:14:04 achieved on 13 October 2019 at the Chicago Marathon. She won the silver medal in the marathon event at the 2020 Tokyo Olympics.

== Personal life ==
Brigid Jepchirchir Kosgei grew up in Elgeyo-Marakwet County, Kenya, and has six siblings. Her sister Pamela is a steeplechase runner. Aged 17, Kosgei began running, training with her boyfriend and now husband Matthew Kosgei.

== Career ==
Kosgei finished in the top two in eight of the first nine marathons that she ran. She came second at the 2016 Lisbon Marathon behind fellow Kenyan Sarah Chepchirchir, in a personal best time of 2:24:45. Her time was faster than the previous course record. In 2017, Kosgei won the Bogotá Half Marathon, and came third at the Copenhagen Half Marathon. She came second in the 2017 Chicago Marathon in a personal best time of 2:20:22. Her time was the sixth-fastest ever time at the Chicago Marathon. Weeks later, she won the Honolulu Marathon, beating the course record by over five minutes. In 2018, Kosgei came second in the London Marathon behind Vivian Cheruiyot. After injuring herself during the Bogotá Marathon, Kosgei decided to run the Great North Run, in order to practice ahead of the 2018 Chicago Marathon. She finished the event second, behind Cheruiyot. Kosgei later won the Chicago Marathon, after breaking away from a group of two other Kenyans and three Ethiopians after 30–35 kilometres (19–22 mi) of the race. She set a personal best time of 2:18:35. During 2018, Kosgei also won a cross country event in Eldoret, Kenya, and the Kalya Half Marathon in Kapenguria, Kenya.

Kosgei won the 2019 London Marathon, becoming the youngest woman to win the event. Her time of 2:18:20 was the third-best time in London after Paula Radcliffe in 2005 with 2:17:42 and Mary Keitany in 2017 with the world record 2:17:01. At the 2019 Great North Run, Kosgei won in a course-record time of 1:04.28, 23 seconds faster than the previous half marathon world record set by Joyciline Jepkosgei.

She won the 2019 Chicago Marathon on 13 October 2019 in a world record time of 2:14:04, an improvement of her personal best by more than 4 minutes. She beat the previous world record by 81 seconds, and was over six minutes ahead of second place Ababel Yeshaneh. Kosgei wore specially adapted Nike shoes, which have been alleged to have given her a 60–90 second advantage. Later in the year, she won the 15 km Saint Silvester Road Race in a time of 48:54.

In February 2020, Kosgei finished second to Yeshaneh at the Ras Al Khaimah Half Marathon. Kosgei's time of 1:04:49 was two seconds better than the previous world record. Kosgei and Yeshaneh's time of 30:18 after 10 kilometres (6.2 mi) of the race was only one second slower than the best time set in a track 10,000m event in 2019. Later in the year, Kosgei won the rescheduled 2020 London Marathon by over three minutes. Kosgei broke away from the pack 18 miles (29 km) into the race and stayed ahead for the rest of the race. She finished in a time of 2:18.58.

Before its postponement, Kosgei was chosen to lead the Kenyan women's marathon squad for the 2020 Summer Olympics in Tokyo, Japan. The other athletes chosen in the squad were Cheruiyot and Ruth Chepng'etich. In February 2021, Kosgei was confirmed in the Kenyan marathon team for the rescheduled 2020 Summer Olympics, alongside Cheruiyot, Chepng'etich and Peres Jepchirchir. It was Kosgei's first appearance at the Olympics. She finished second behind Jepchirchir. Later in the year, she came fourth at the 2021 London Marathon. In March 2022, Kosgei won the delayed 2021 Tokyo Marathon in a time of 2:16:20, the third fastest ever time.

At the 2024 ADNOC Abu Dhabi Marathon, Kosgei broke the course record in a time of 2:19:15.

In April 2026, World Athletics rejected an application to switch Kosgei's nationality to Turkey, describing it as part of "a coordinated recruitment strategy... to attract overseas athletes through lucrative contracts" which was not consistent with its eligibility rules and transfer of allegiance regulations.

== Achievements ==
All information from World Athletics profile unless otherwise noted.

=== Marathon competition record ===
Year	Date	Competition	Location	Rank	Time
2015	8 November	Porto Marathon	Porto	1st	2:47:59
2016	3 April	Milano City Marathon	Milan	1st	2:27:45
2016	2 October	Lisbon Marathon	Lisbon	2nd	2:24:45
2016	11 December	Honolulu Marathon	Honolulu	1st	2:31:11
2017	17 April	Boston Marathon	Boston	8th	2:31:48
2017	8 October	Chicago Marathon	Chicago	2nd	2:20:22
2017	10 December	Honolulu Marathon	Honolulu	1st	2:22:15
2018	22 April	London Marathon	London	2nd	2:20:13
2018	7 October	Chicago Marathon	Chicago	1st	2:18:35
2019	28 April	London Marathon	London	1st	2:18:20
2019	13 October	Chicago Marathon	Chicago	1st	2:14:04
2020	4 October	London Marathon	London	1st	2:18:58
2021	7 August	Olympic Games	Sapporo	2nd	2:27:36
2021	3 October	London Marathon	London	4th	2:18:40
2022	6 March	Tokyo Marathon	Tokyo	1st	2:16:20
2025	31 August	Sydney Marathon	Sydney	2nd	2:18:56
2026	1 March	Tokyo Marathon	Tokyo	1st	2:14:29
2026	11 October	Chicago Marathon	Chicago	3rd	2:14:55

=== Personal bests ===
Distance	Time (h):m:s	Location	Date	Notes
5 km	15:13	Lisbon, Portugal	19 May 2019	
10 km	30:58	Atlanta, GA, United States	4 July 2022	(also 29:54 * not legal)
15 km	48:54	São Paulo, Brazil	31 December 2019	
Half marathon	1:04:49	Ras Al Khaimah, United Arab Emirates	21 February 2020	(also 1:04:28 * not legal)
Marathon	2:14:04	Chicago, IL, United States	13 October 2019	Mx World record

Records
Preceded by (United Kingdom) Paula Radcliffe	Women's Marathon World Record Holder; 13 October 2019 – 24 September 2023	Succeeded by (Ethiopia) Tigst Assefa
