= Dejene Debela =

Ethiopian long-distance runner

Personal information
- Full name: Dejene Debela Gonfa
- Born: 9 January 1995 (age 31)

Sport
- Country: Ethiopia
- Sport: Athletics
- Event: Long-distance running

Dejene Debela Gonfa (born 9 January 1995) is an Ethiopian long-distance runner. He won the Xiamen International Marathon both in 2018 and in 2019.

He also won the Beijing Marathon in 2018 and he finished in 2nd place with a personal best of 2:05:46 at the 2019 Chicago Marathon.

== Achievements ==
Year	Competition	Venue	Position	Event	Notes
Representing Ethiopia
2016	Eindhoven Marathon	Eindhoven, Netherlands	5th	Marathon	2:10:13
2017	Dubai Marathon	Dubai, United Arab Emirates	11th	Marathon	2:12:18
2017	Eindhoven Marathon	Eindhoven, Netherlands	4th	Marathon	2:07:10
2018	Xiamen International Marathon	Xiamen, China	1st	Marathon	2:11:22
2018	Rome Marathon	Rome, Italy	7th	Marathon	2:12:01
2018	Beijing Marathon	Beijing, China	1st	Marathon	2:12:08
2018	Abu Dhabi Marathon	Abu Dhabi, United Arab Emirates	2nd	Marathon	2:07:06
2019	Xiamen International Marathon	Xiamen, China	1st	Marathon	2:09:26
2019	Chicago Marathon	Chicago, United States	2nd	Marathon	2:05:46
2020	Xiamen International Marathon	Xiamen, China	5th	Marathon	2:11:07
2020	Marrakech Marathon	Marrakesh, Morocco	9th	Marathon	2:09:10
