= Shure Demise =

Ethiopian long-distance runner

Shure Demise Ware (born January 21, 1996) is an Ethiopian long-distance runner who specializes in road running competitions.

At the 2015 Dubai Marathon, Demise set a junior world record in the marathon where she finished 4th overall.

Demise finished 8th at the 2015 Boston Marathon.

In 2019, she competed in the women's marathon at the World Athletics Championships held in Doha, Qatar. She did not finish her race.

In 2026, she won the Paris Marathon’s women's race in a course-record time of 2:18:34.
