= Amy Cragg =

American long-distance runner (born 1984)

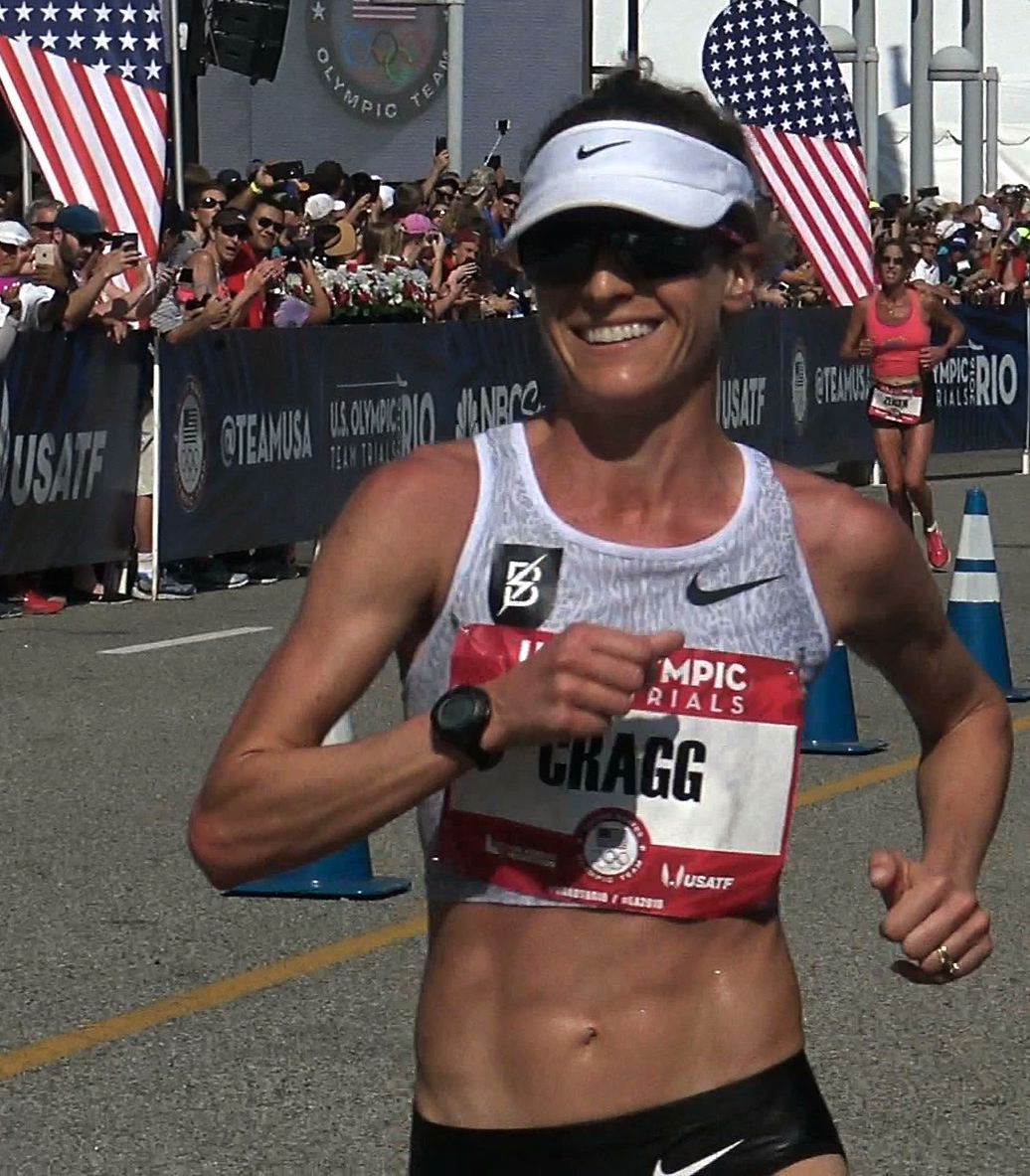
- Cragg in 2016

Personal information
- Born: January 21, 1984 (age 42) Long Beach, California, U.S.
- Height: 5 ft 4 in (163 cm)
- Weight: 100 lb (45 kg)

Sport
- Country: United States
- Sport: Track and field
- Events: 10,000 metres, Marathon
- College team: Arizona State University
- Club: Bowerman Track Club
- Turned pro: 2007
- Coached by: Jerry Schumacher

Achievements and titles
- Olympic finals: 2012; 10,000 m, 11th 2016; Marathon, 9th
- World finals: 2011; 5000 m, 14th 2013; 10,000 m, 14th 2017; Marathon, Bronze
- Personal bests: 5000 m: 15:09.59 (Waltham 2013); 10,000 m: 31:10.69 (London 2012); 10 km: 31:31 (Boston 2016); Half marathon: 68:27 (Marugame 2017); Marathon: 2:21:42 (Tokyo 2018)
Medal record
Women's Athletics
Representing the United States
World Championships
Bronze medal – third place	2017 London	Marathon
World Marathon Majors
Bronze medal – third place	2018 Tokyo	Marathon

Amy Cragg (née Hastings; born January 21, 1984) is an American track and field athlete, specializing in long distance running events. She is the 2015 American champion in the Marathon, the 2012 American champion in the 10,000 meters, and a qualifier for the 2012 Summer Olympics.

== Early career ==
Hastings went to high school at Leavenworth High School in Leavenworth, Kansas. During her career, she captured three state titles on the track and won the state cross country championships.

She was an Arizona State University teammate of Desiree Davila, the qualifying second-place finisher in that same race. Running for ASU, Hastings had been the 2005 NCAA Indoor Champion in the 5000 meters. Amy earned her first All-American honor at 2003 NCAA Women's Division I Cross Country Championship in 25th place. Hastings ranks as one of the all-time greats to pass through the ranks in the Maroon and Gold, earning seven All-America honors for track and field and three for cross country. Her 10 total All-America honors rank her second in ASU history. Hastings was the 2006 NCAA Champion at 5,000-meters NCAA Women's Division I Indoor Track and Field Championships.

== International competition ==
Amy Hastings Cragg trained in Providence, Rhode Island, with Kim Smith and Molly Huddle under the guidance of Coach Ray Treacy until November 2015.

Sponsored by Brooks, 2011 was her breakthrough year. She knocked 34 seconds off her previous results in the 5000 meters, to become runner up at the 2011 USA Outdoor Track and Field Championships in 15:14.31. The results of that race also qualified her for the 2011 IAAF World Championships, where she qualified for the final.

2011 was also the year she tried her first marathon, at the Los Angeles Marathon. Her second-place finish in 2:27:03 made her the eighth fastest American.

In 2012, she finished in fourth place in the United States Marathon Olympic Trials.

"I cried about it probably every day for a month. But at the same time, every single day it was getting back into it and going to work and trying to recover and doing everything right to prepare myself for this day."

She won the 10,000 meters at the 2012 US Olympic Trials. At the London 2012 Summer Olympics, Hastings was able to stay with the lead group of East Africans until the 18 minute mark before falling back to finish 11th in 31:10, roughly 50 seconds behind the gold medalist Tirunesh Dibaba.

In the 10,000 m at the 2013 World Championship in Moscow, Russia, Hastings finished 14th in 32:51.19. Hastings announced she will run New York Marathon in November and will focus on the distance in future world events. Hastings finished 20th in 2013 New York City Marathon in 2:42:50.

On July 4, 2014, Hastings won the Peachtree Road Race in Atlanta, GA with a time of 32:16. The race also served as the 10,000 meter National Championship.

On October 12 at the 2014 Chicago Marathon, Amy Hastings finished fifth in 2:27:03.

On March 14, 2015, Cragg won USA title by 32 seconds at USA Track and Field 15 km championship in Jacksonville, Florida, with a time of 50:18.

On June 25, 2015, Cragg finished 4th in 10,000 meters in 32:03.95 at 2015 USA Outdoor Track and Field Championships. On 7 September 2015, she placed 14th at USA 20K Championship during the New Haven Road Race in 1:11:22. On 13 February 2016, she placed first at the US Olympic Marathon Trials, finishing in 2:28:20 on a warm day in Los Angeles. On August 14, 2016, she placed 9th at Athletics at the 2016 Summer Olympics – Women's marathon in 2:28:25. On August 6, 2017, she placed 3rd at the 2017 World Championships in Athletics in London, United Kingdom, in 2:27:18.

== Competition record ==
Year	Competition	Venue	Position	Event	Notes
Representing the United States
2003	World Cross Country Championships	Lausanne, Switzerland	20th	Junior race	22.34
2008	World Cross Country Championships	Edinburgh, Scotland	62nd	Senior race	28:18
2009	World Half Marathon Championships	Birmingham, England	32nd	Half marathon	1:13:20
2010	World Cross Country Championship	Bydgoszcz, Poland	25th	Senior race	26:20
2011	Los Angeles Marathon	Los Angeles, California	2nd	Marathon	2:27:03
2011	World Championships	Daegu, South Korea	14th	5000 m	15:56.06
2012	Olympic Games	London, England	11th	10,000 m	31:10.69
2013	World Championships	Moscow, Russia	14th	10,000 m	32:51.19
2013	New York City Marathon	New York, New York	20th	Marathon	2:42:50
2014	Chicago Marathon	Chicago, Illinois	4th	Marathon	2:27:03
2016	Rio Olympic Marathon	Rio de Janeiro, Brazil	9th	Marathon	2:28:25
2017	World Championships	London, UK	3rd	Marathon	2:27:18
2018	Tokyo Marathon	Tokyo	3rd	Marathon	2:21:42

=== USA National Championships ===
==== Road ====
Year	Competition	Venue	Position	Event	Notes
2009	USA 20 km Championships	New Haven, Connecticut	5th	20 km	1:08:58
2009	USA 5 km Championships	Providence, Rhode Island	9th	5 km	16:11
2010	USA Half Marathon Championships	Houston, Texas	3rd	Half marathon	1:11:19
2010	USA 15 km Championships	Jacksonville, Florida	8th	15;km	51:55
2010	USA 7 Mile Championships	Davenport, Iowa	2nd	7 Mile	38:33
2010	USA 20 km Championships	New Haven, Connecticut	7th	20 km	1:09:52
2011	USA Half Marathon Championships	Duluth, Minnesota	7th	Half marathon	1:14:07
2012	US Olympic Trials	Houston, Texas	4th	Marathon	2:27:17
2014	USA 10 km Championships	Atlanta, Georgia	1st	10 km	32:16
2014	USA 7 Mile Championships	Davenport, Iowa	7th	7 Mile	38:27
2014	USA 20 km Championships	New Haven, Connecticut	2nd	20 km	1:08:54
2015	USA 15 km Championships	Jacksonville, Florida	1st	15 km	50:18
2015	USA 20 km Championships	New Haven, Connecticut	14th	20 km	1:11:22
2016	US Olympic Trials	Los Angeles, California	1st	Marathon	2:28:20

==== Track and Field ====
Year	Competition	Venue	Position	Event	Notes
2003	USA Junior Outdoor Track and Field Championships	Palo Alto, California	1st	5000 m	16:28.60
2006	USA Outdoor Track and Field Championships	Indianapolis, Indiana	15th	5000 m	16:22.82
2007	USA Outdoor Track and Field Championships	Indianapolis, Indiana	9th	5000 m	16:08.71
2008	US Olympic Trials	Eugene, Oregon	14th	10,000 m	33:37.52
2008	US Olympic Trials	Eugene, Oregon	14th	5000 m	16:07.03
2009	USA Outdoor Track and Field Championships	Eugene, Oregon	6th	10,000 m	32:56.20
2009	USA Outdoor Track and Field Championships	Eugene, Oregon	10th	5000 m	15:52.37
2010	USA Outdoor Track and Field Championships	Des Moines, Iowa	5th	10,000 m	32:49.07
2011	USA Outdoor Track and Field Championships	Eugene, Oregon	2nd	5000 m	15:14.31
2012	US Olympic Trials	Eugene, Oregon	1st	10,000 m	31:58.36
2013	USA Outdoor Track and Field Championships	Des Moines, IA	4th	10,000 m	32:31.28
2015	USA Outdoor Track and Field Championships	Eugene, Oregon	4th	10,000 m	32:03.95

==== Cross country ====
Year	Competition	Venue	Position	Event	Notes
2008	USA Cross Country Championships	San Diego, California	8th	Senior race	27:12
2010	USA Cross Country Championships	Spokane, Washington	3rd	Senior race	26:06

=== NCAA championships ===
==== Outdoor Track and Field ====
Year	Competition	Venue	Position	Event	Notes
Representing Arizona State
2005	NCAA Outdoor Track and Field Championships	Sacramento, California	—	10,000 m	DNF
2006	NCAA Outdoor Track and Field Championships	Sacramento, California	4th	10,000 m	33:41.18
2007	NCAA Outdoor Track and Field Championships	Sacramento, California	4th	10,000 m	33:08.27

==== Indoor track and field ====
Year	Competition	Venue	Position	Event	Notes
Representing Arizona State
2004	NCAA Indoor Track and Field Championships	Fayetteville, Arkansas	11th	5000 m	16:24.58
2005	NCAA Indoor Track and Field Championships	Fayetteville, Arkansas	5th	5000 m	16:06.62
2006	NCAA Indoor Track and Field Championships	Fayetteville, Arkansas	19th	3000 m	9:42.55
2006	NCAA Indoor Track and Field Championships	Fayetteville, Arkansas	1st	5000 m	15:51.63
2007	NCAA Indoor Track and Field Championships	Fayetteville, Arkansas	6th	3000 m	9:19.31
2007	NCAA Indoor Track and Field Championships	Fayetteville, Arkansas	4th	5000 m	15:52.10

==== Cross country ====
Year	Competition	Venue	Position	Notes
Representing Arizona State
2002	NCAA Cross Country Championships	Terre Haute, Indiana	92nd	21:14.3
2003	NCAA Cross Country Championships	Waterloo, Iowa	25th	20:32.9
2004	NCAA Cross Country Championships	Terre Haute, Indiana	22nd	20:56.9
2005	NCAA Cross Country Championships	Terre Haute, Indiana	13th	20:09.0
