= Florence Kiplagat =

Kenyan long-distance runner

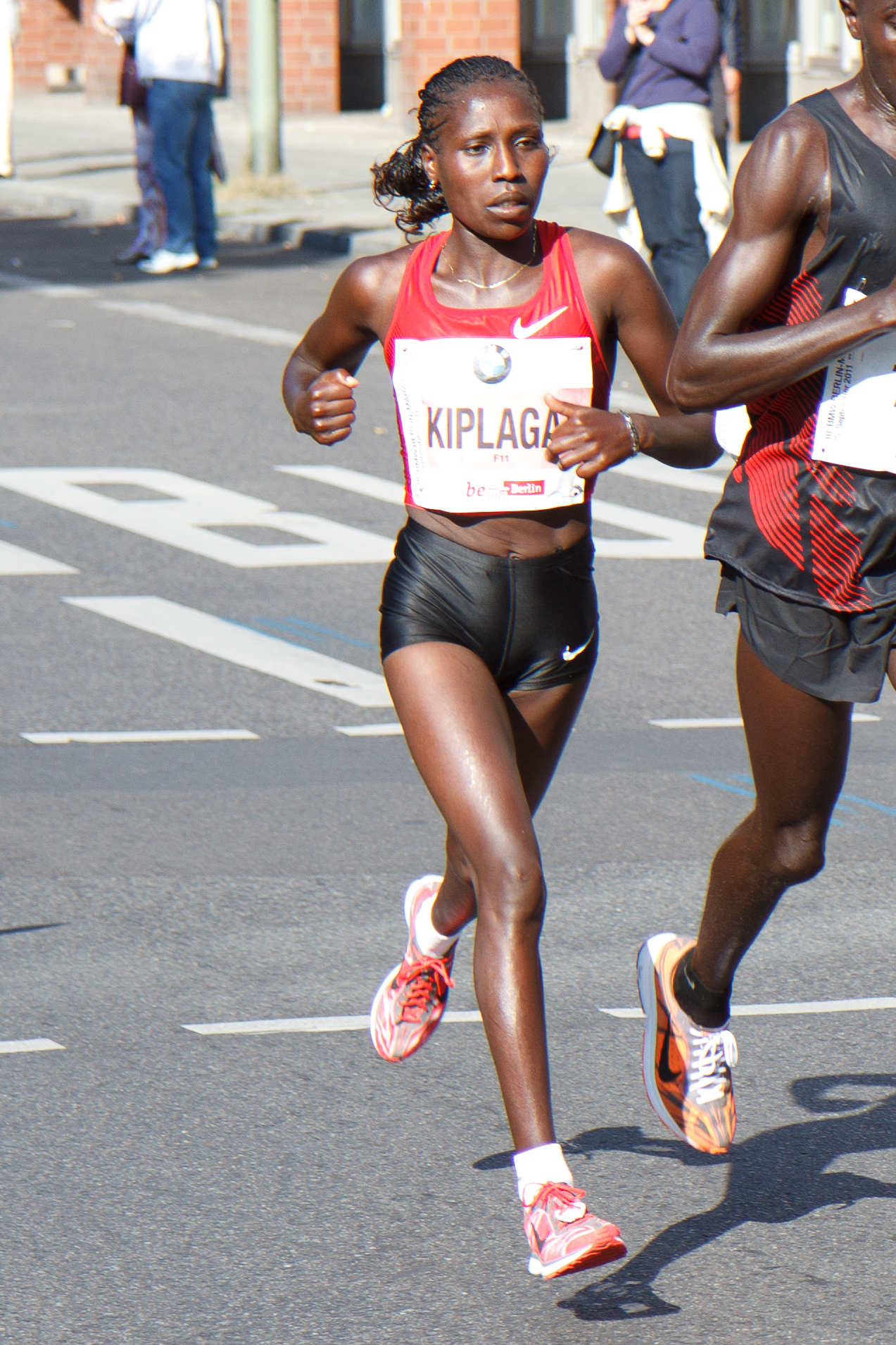
- Kiplagat at the 2011 Berlin Marathon

Medal record

Women's athletics

Representing Kenya

World Cross Country Championships
Gold medal – first place	2009 Amman	Long race

World Half Marathon Championships
Gold medal – first place	2010 Nanning	Half marathon

Commonwealth Games
Silver medal – second place	2014 Glasgow	10000 m

Florence Jebet Kiplagat (born 27 February 1987) is a Kenyan professional long-distance runner. She is a two-time world champion, having won at the 2009 IAAF World Cross Country Championships and the 2010 IAAF World Half Marathon Championships. She was the world record holder for the women's half marathon with a time of 1:05:09 hours until it was broken by Peres Jepchirchir on 10 February 2017 at the RAK Half Marathon.

She has also represented Kenya on the track, having won the silver medal over 5000 m at the 2006 World Junior Championships in Athletics. She competed in the 10,000 m at the 2009 World Championships in Athletics and was the Kenyan record holder in the event with her best of 30:11.53 minutes until it was broken by Vivian Cheruiyot on 12 August 2016 at the Rio Olympic Games.

Kiplagat is currently part of the NN Running Team, an international team of elite long-distance runners managed by Global Sports Communication.

== Career ==
Kiplagat studied at the Sirgoech Secondary School in Iten and she hoped to get a scholarship in the United States. She failed to get a scholarship, but had a successful start for her running career. She won the silver medal in 5000 m at the 2006 World Junior Championships. At the 2007 World Cross Country Championships she finished fifth in the senior race, while the Kenyan team of which she was a part won the silver medal in the team competition.

She was out of activity in 2008 after becoming a mother. After motherhood, she started the collaboration with the Italian Coach Renato Canova, which has produced great results, to this day. She made comeback in early 2009 by winning the Elgoibar Cross Country and Cross Internacional de Itálica meetings in Spain. She won the women race at the 2009 IAAF World Cross Country Championships ahead of compatriot Linet Masai. She became the second Kenyan to win the long race at the World Cross Country Championships, the first one was Hellen Chepngeno, who won in 1994. On 14 June 2009 she finished 2nd in the 10,000 m race in Utrecht. Kiplagat's time, 30:11.53 was a Kenyan record. The previous national record (30:26.50), was set by Linet Masai at the 2008 Olympics.

Florence Kiplagat did not defend her world cross-country title in 2010, as she was recovering from an injury. She made her debut over the half marathon distance in September 2010 and managed to win first time, beating Peninah Arusei to the Lille Half Marathon title with a time of 1:07:40. This was enough to gain selection for the 2010 IAAF World Half Marathon Championships and she defeated Dire Tune in the final stages of the race to take the women's world title in only her second outing over the distance. She also led Kenya to another world team title alongside Arusei, her Lille rival. Having taken global titles in cross country and road running, she stated her intention to focus on reaching the podium on the track at the 2011 World Championships in Athletics and the 2012 London Olympics. She ran in the 15K race at the Zevenheuvelenloop and was runner-up to Genet Getaneh, but at the Sapporo Half Marathon she continued her undefeated streak over that distance.

Kiplagat's marathon debut came at the 2011 Berlin Marathon and she started quickly, outpacing both Paula Radcliffe and Irina Mikitenko to claim her first victory in 2:19:44 hours – the third fastest run by a woman that year. She was the favourite for the 2012 Egmond Half Marathon, but finished as runner-up behind Meseret Hailu. She moved up to third on the all-time lists with a winning run of 1:06:38 hours at the Roma-Ostia Half Marathon. She turned to the 10,000 m at the Prefontaine Classic and claimed the runner-up spot behind Tirunesh Dibaba. She failed to make the Olympic team in the event, however, narrowly finishing fourth at the Kenyan trial race.

She missed the rest of 2012, but returned at the RAK Half Marathon in February the next year and had her second fastest ever result (67:13 minutes), although the depth of the race left her in fifth. She was one of the favourites entering the 2013 London Marathon but she underperformed, coming sixth in a time of 2:27:05 hours. In August she won the half marathon of Klagenfurt in 70:06 minutes. The 2013 Berlin Marathon saw her top the field with her winning time of 2:21:13 hours, beating Sharon Cherop by over a minute. The following month she won the Great South Run with a time of 53:53 minutes – two minutes clear of the rest of the competition. A win at the Delhi Half Marathon closed a successful year.

Kiplagat broke the half marathon world record by a significant margin at the Barcelona Half Marathon in February 2014, running 1:05:12 hours to beat Mary Keitany's old mark by 38 seconds. She also took the world record for the 20 km distance as well with a time of 1:01:56 hours.

Kiplagat finished in second place at the 2014 London Marathon in a time of 2:20:24, being narrowly defeated by her (unrelated) compatriot Edna Kiplagat.

In 2015, Kiplagat set the Half Marathon World Record with a time of 1:05:09 on 15 February in Barcelona, Spain. She continued her 2015 season success with a victory at the 2015 Chicago Marathon with a time of 2:23:33 after pulling away from the competition in the 25th mile of the race.

== Personal life ==
Kiplagat comes from the Keiyo subtribe of the Kalenjin people and was born near Marakwet. Marathon runner William Kiplagat is her uncle She is coached by Renato Canova.

== Achievements ==
Year	Competition	Venue	Position	Event	Notes
Representing Kenya
2006	World Junior Championships	Beijing, China	2nd	5000 m	15:32.34
2007	World Cross Country Championships	Mombasa, Kenya	5th	Long race (8 km)	27:26
2007	World Cross Country Championships	Mombasa, Kenya	2nd	Team	26 pts
2009	World Cross Country Championships	Amman, Jordan	1st	Long race (8 km)	26:13
2009	World Cross Country Championships	Amman, Jordan	1st	Team	14 pts
2009	World Championships	Berlin, Germany	12th	10,000 m	31:30.85
2010	World Half Marathon Championships	Nanning, China	1st	Half marathon	1:08:24
2010	World Half Marathon Championships	Nanning, China	1st	Team	3:26:59
2014	Commonwealth Games	Glasgow, Scotland	2nd	10,000 m	32:09.48
2015	Chicago Marathon	Chicago, United States	1st	Marathon	2:23:33
2016	London Marathon	London, United Kingdom	3rd	Marathon	2:23:39
2016	Chicago Marathon	Chicago, United States	1st	Marathon	2:21:32 (unofficial)

=== World Marathon Majors results ===
World Marathon Majors	2011	2012	2013	2014	2015	2016	2017
Tokyo Marathon	-	-	-	-	-	-	-
Boston Marathon	-	-	-	-	-	-	-
London Marathon	-	4th	6th	2nd	5th	3rd	9th
Berlin Marathon	1st	-	1st	-	-	-	-
Chicago Marathon	-	-	-	2nd	1st	1st	DNF
New York City Marathon	-	-	-	-	-	-	-

== Personal bests ==
- 1500 metres – 4:09.0 min (2007)
- 5000 metres – 14:40.14 min (2009)
- 10,000 metres – 30:11.53 min (2009)
- 10 miles – 53:53 min (2013)
- 15 km – 46:14 min (2015) WR
- 20 km – 61:54 min (2015)
- Half marathon – 1:05:09 hrs (2015)
- 30 km – 1:39:48 hrs (2011)
- Marathon – 2:19:44 (2011)

Records
Preceded by (Kenya) Mary Keitany	Women's Half marathon World record holder 16 February 2014 – 10 February 2017	Succeeded by (Kenya) Peres Jepchirchir
