= Jackson Boulevard District and Extension =

Historic district in Illinois, United States

- West Jackson Boulevard District
- U.S. National Register of Historic Places
- U.S. Historic district
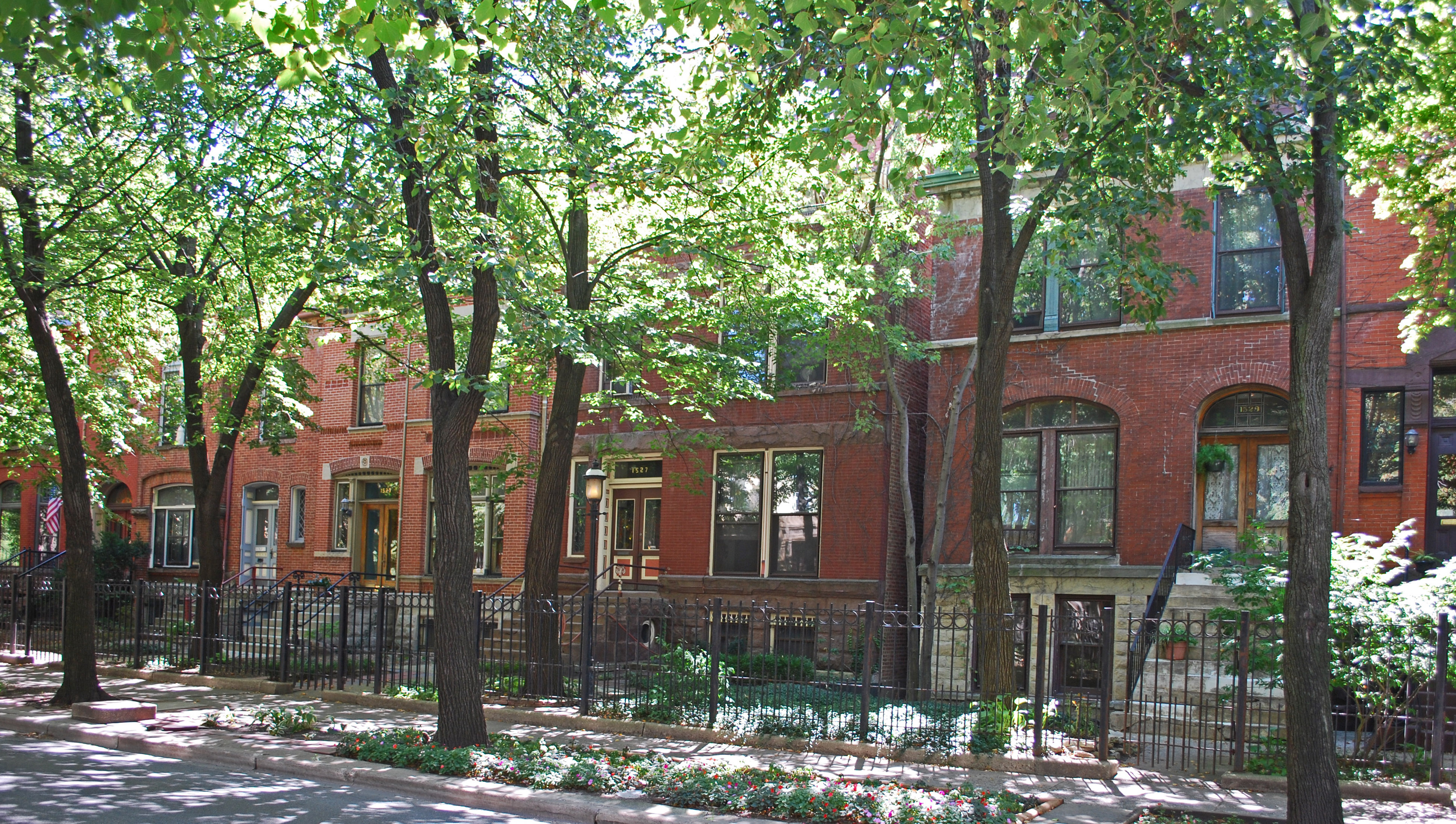

- Location within Chicago metropolitan area Location within Illinois Location within the United States
- Location: Roughly bounded by Laflin, Ashland, Adams, and Van Buren Sts., Chicago, Illinois
- Coordinates: 41°52′39″N 87°39′55″W
- Area: 8.5 acres (3.4 ha)
- Built: 1879 to 1893
- Architect: Multiple
- Architectural style: Second Empire, Italianate, Queen Anne
- NRHP reference No.: 78001134 and 89001729
- Added to NRHP: May 19, 1978 and October 19, 1989

The West Jackson Boulevard District in Chicago, Illinois, also known as West Jackson Historic District, was listed on the National Register of Historic Places in 1978. It was earlier designed as a Chicago Landmark, in 1976, and expanded as Jackson Boulevard District and Extension in 1997. The NRHP district was expanded in 1989 to include one more building, the James H. Pearson House.

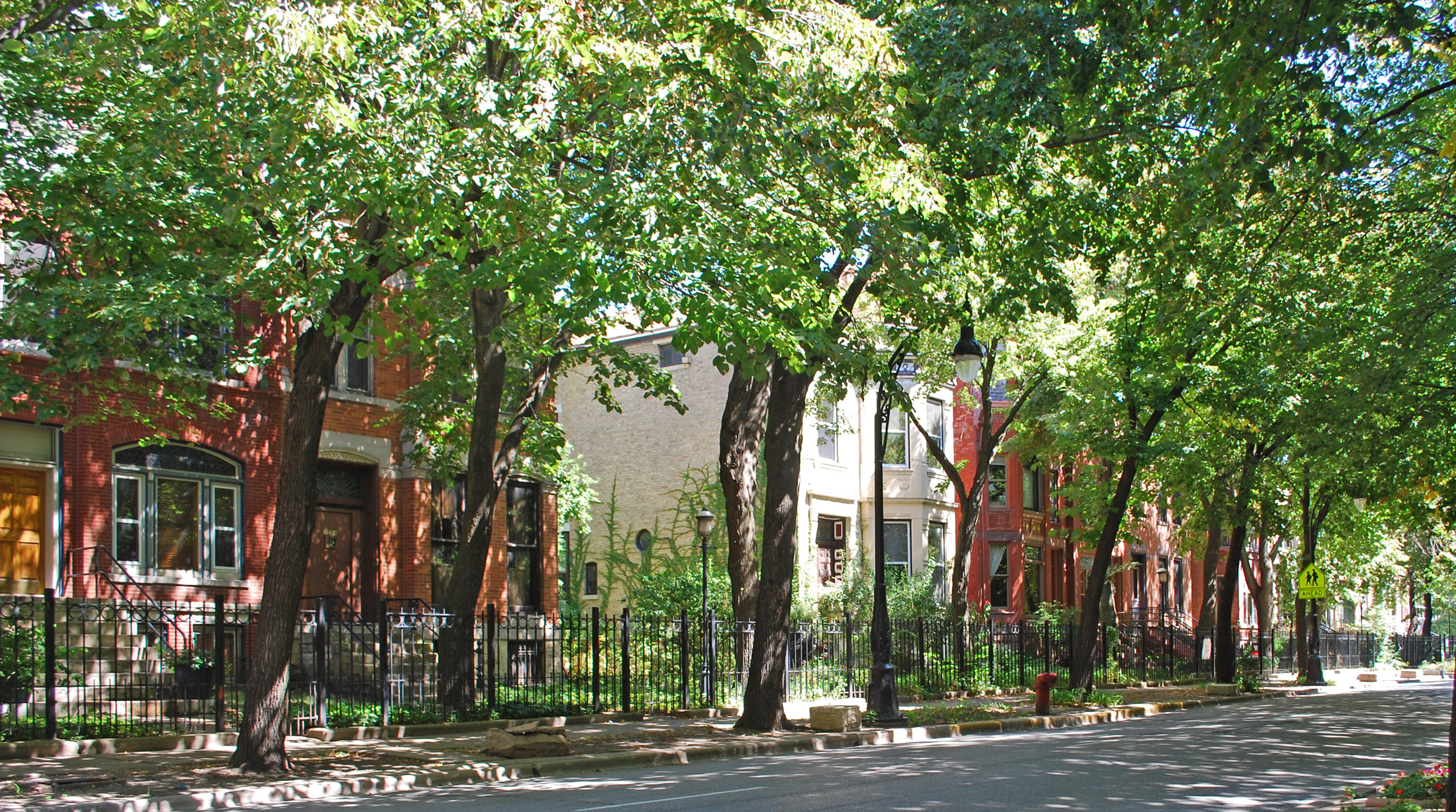

The district is a historic district in the Near West Side community area of Chicago, Illinois, United States. The district's area was built up between 1879 and 1893 by various architects. Lumber baron Benjamin Ferguson commissioned a red brick Queen Anne house in 1883 that takes up three city lots. The area also includes the Church of the Epiphany. The original district was designated a Chicago Landmark on November 15, 1976, and was then extended to present size on July 30, 1997.

The 1978 NRHP listing covered an 8.5-acre (3.4 ha) area roughly bounded by Laflin, Ashland, Adams, and Van Buren Sts. It included 34 contributing buildings in Second Empire, Italianate, Queen Anne and other styles.

The James H. Pearson House, a building at 1513 W. Adams St., which had been constructed in 1885, was added to the NRHP listing in 1989. It was designed by architects Burnham & Root in Richardsonian Romanesque style.

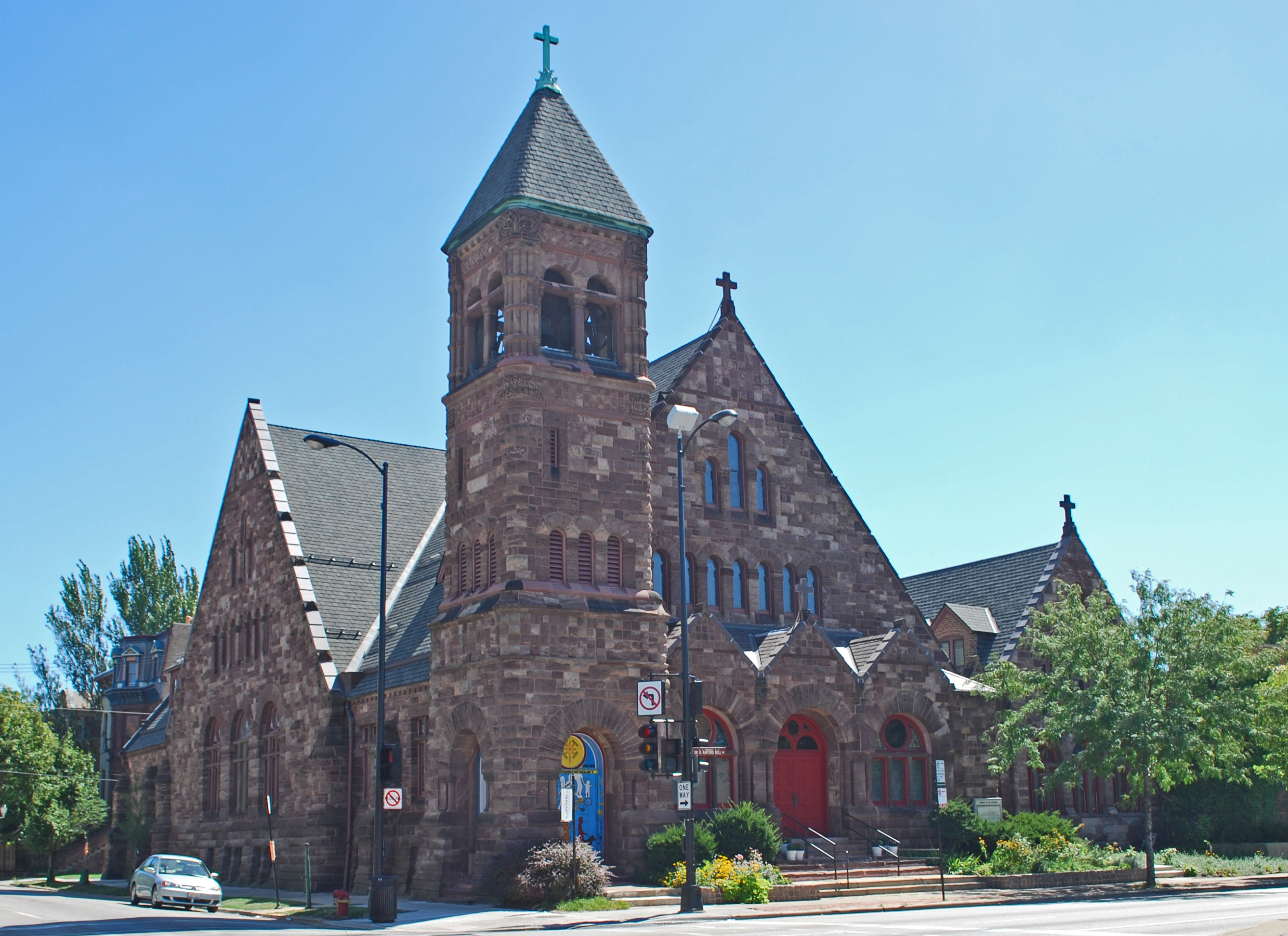
Church of the Epiphany
