= Monroe Street Bridge (Chicago River) =

Bridge in Chicago, Illinois, U.S.

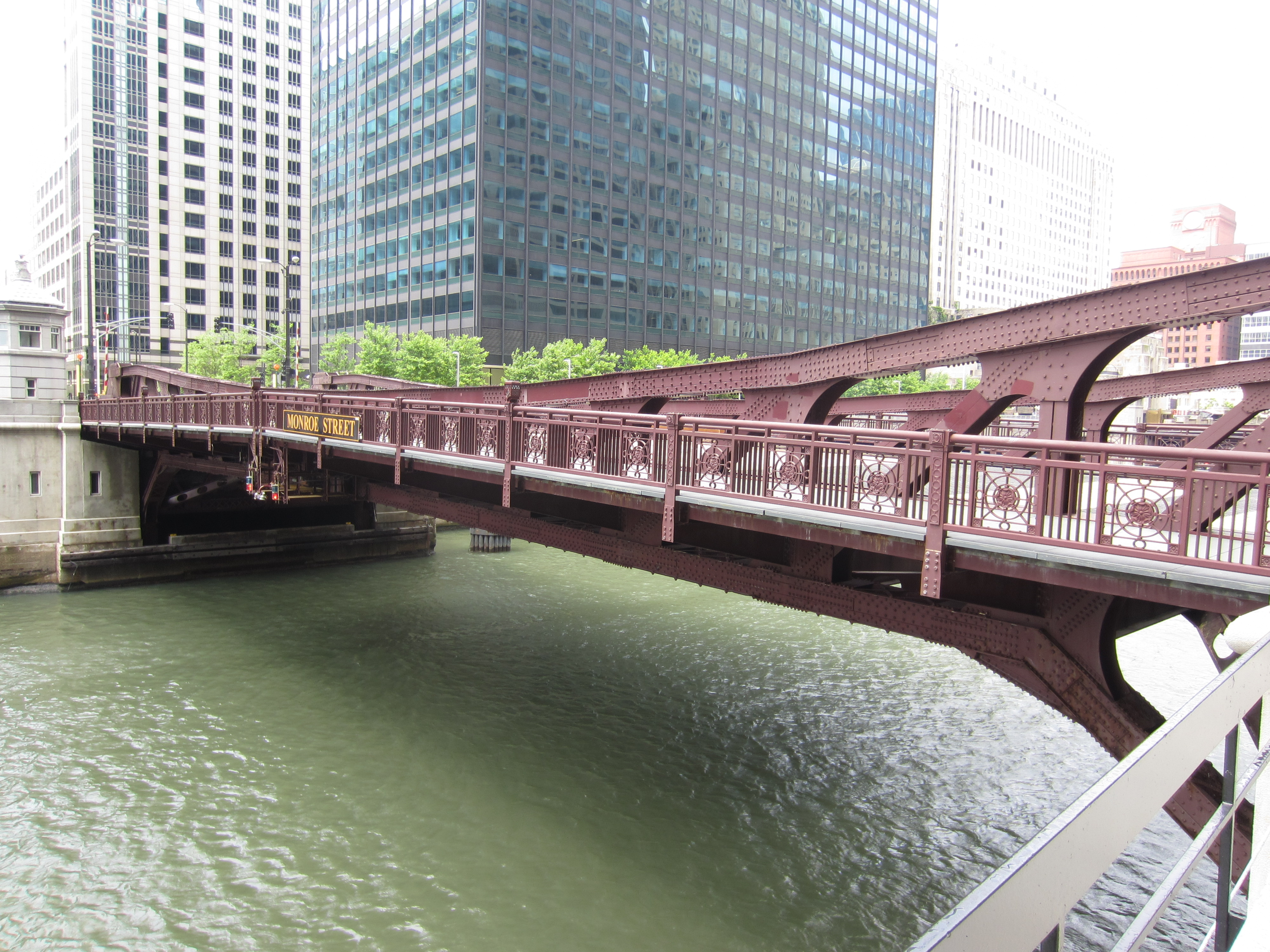
- Monroe Street Bridge in 2015
- Coordinates: 41°52′50″N 87°38′18″W
- Crosses: Chicago River

The Monroe Street Bridge is a bascule bridge that crosses the Chicago River in downtown Chicago, Illinois. It was constructed by Burns & McDonnell.
