= Abel Kirui =

Kenyan long-distance runner

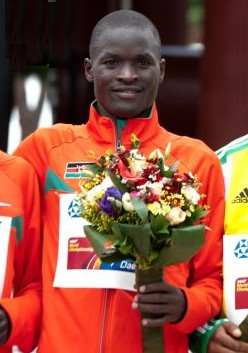
- Kirui on the podium after winning gold at the 2011 World Championships

Personal information
- Born: 6 April 1982 (age 44)

Sport
- Country: Kenya
- Sport: Athletics
- Event: Marathon
- Team: NN Running Team
Medal record
Olympic Games
Silver medal – second place	2012 London	Marathon
World Championships
Gold medal – first place	2009 Berlin	Marathon
Gold medal – first place	2011 Daegu	Marathon
World Marathon Majors
Gold medal – first place	2016 Chicago	Marathon
Silver medal – second place	2017 Chicago	Marathon
Silver medal – second place	2007 Berlin	Marathon

Abel Kirui (born 6 April 1982) is a long-distance runner from Kenya who competes in marathons. He had back-to-back wins in the World Championship marathon in 2009 and 2011. Kirui won in 2009 with a time of 2:06:54, then defended his title with a winning margin of two minutes and 28 seconds – the largest ever margin at the World Championship event. He earned the silver medal in the 2012 London Olympic marathon.

He has also won the 2008 Vienna City Marathon, the 2016 Chicago Marathon and was runner-up at the 2007 Berlin Marathon and 2017 Chicago Marathon.

== Career ==
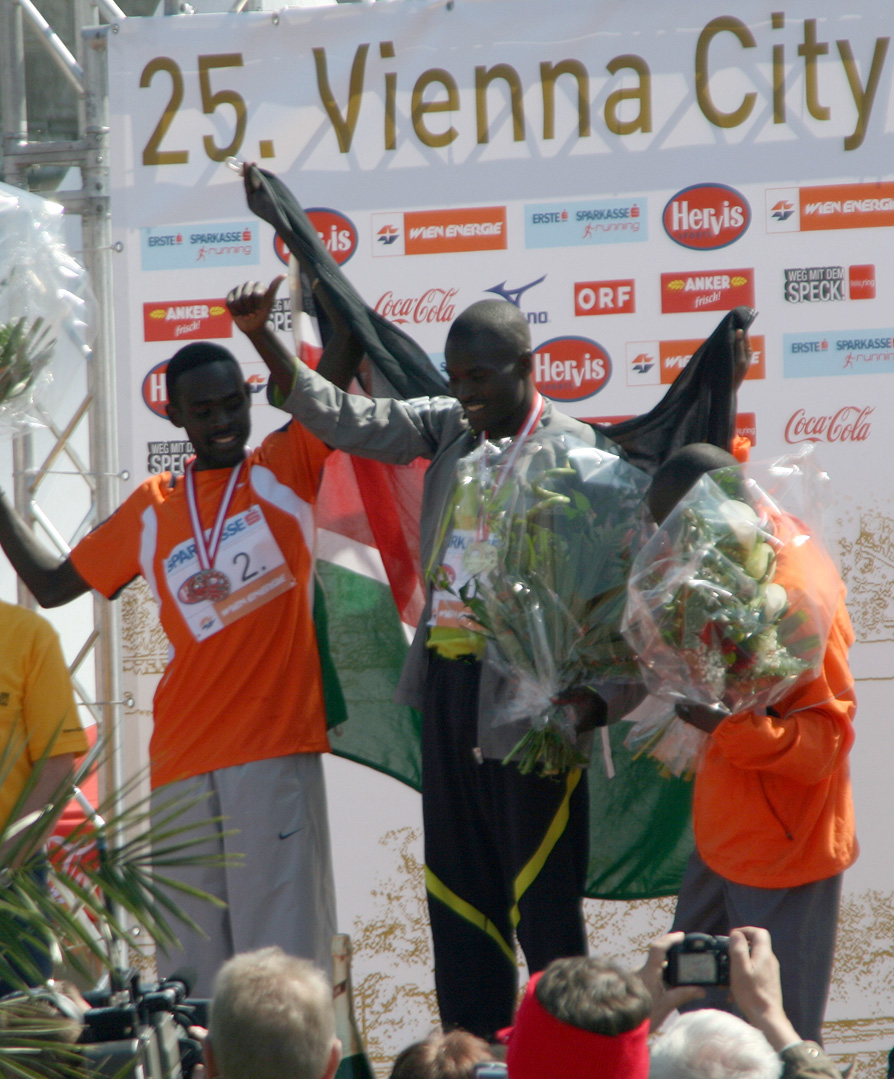
Kirui tops the podium after setting a course record at the Vienna City Marathon

Abel Kirui started running while in Samitui Primary School. After high school, the jobless Kirui entered a recruitment race by Administration Police (AP); the winner of such race would be recruited by AP. He won the race and subsequently joined AP, starting serious training only after then. He entered the 2006 Berlin Marathon as a pacemaker, but finished the race ninth.

At the 2007 Berlin Marathon, Kirui finished second with a time of 2:06:51, after the winner Haile Gebrselassie, who set a new marathon world record. The time made Kirui the sixth fastest marathoner in 2007. He also won the Paderborn Half-marathon in 2007. At the 2008 Vienna City Marathon, he won with a new course record of 2:07:38.

He finished third in the 2009 Rotterdam Marathon with a time of 2:05:04 after fellow Kenyans Duncan Kibet and James Kwambai, making him the sixth fastest marathoner ever. On 22 August, Kirui took gold over his teammate Emmanuel Mutai who took silver at the 2009 World Championships in Athletics in Berlin at a record time of 2:06:54.

After the 2009 World Championships, Kirui had many unsuccessful attempts to show the dominance he had shown in his Berlin race: he finished in fifth place at the 2010 London Marathon, then failed to finish at the 2011 London Marathon.

Immediately after that failure, he started training with the Italian Coach Renato Canova, moving from Kapsabet to Iten, together with Jonathan Maiyo. Training with Canova's group, he was able to recruit the best shape, winning in Daegu his second title in World Championships. Kirui ran at the Prefontaine Classic track 25K/30K mixed race, hoping to set a new 25k track record. Although he just managed to dip under the previous world record time for the track 25K, he was well beaten by fellow Kenyan and teammate Moses Mosop, who broke both 25K and 30K world records.

He was given the wildcard spot on the Kenyan marathon team as the defending champion at the 2011 World Championships in Athletics. Kirui ran a time of 2:07:38 beating out fellow countryman Vincent Kipruto and Ethiopian Feyisa Lilesa. This made Kirui the third man to defend the marathon world title, following in the steps of Abel Antón and Jaouad Gharib. He ran over 10 miles at the Great South Run in October and finished as runner-up to Leonard Komon.

Kirui finished in second at the 2012 Summer Olympics with a time of 2:08:27 barely losing to the winner Stephen Kiprotich by 26 seconds.

At the 2016 Chicago Marathon, he won with the time of 2:11:23, barely beating Dickson Chumba by 3 seconds. Kirui finished in second place at the 2017 Chicago Marathon with a time of 2:09:48 barely losing to the winner Galen Rupp by 28 seconds.

Kirui finished the 2017 London Marathon, in fourth place with a time of 2:07:45. The following year, at the 2018 London Marathon he once again finished fourth with a time of 2:07:07.

== Personal life ==
Kirui lives at Nabkoi, east of Kapsabet. He is married to Stella Jemeli and has a son Tevin Kipchumba. Kirui is a member of the Seventh-day Adventist Church. Kirui along with fellow Seventh-day Adventists Priscah Jeptoo and Amos Tirop Matui founded Better Living Marathon. Marathon runner Michael Kosgei Rotich is his uncle. Kirui is coached by Renato Canova.
