= 2017 Chicago Marathon =

Footrace held in Chicago, Illinois

40th Chicago Marathon
- Venue: Chicago, United States
- Date: October 8, 2017

Champions
- Men: Galen Rupp (2:09:20) (Elite); Marcel Hug (Wheelchair)
- Women: Tirunesh Dibaba (2:18:30) (Elite); Tatyana McFadden (Wheelchair)

The 2017 Chicago Marathon was the 40th annual edition of the Chicago Marathon held in Chicago, Illinois, United States, and was held on October 8. The race had 44,508 finishers, and the number of spectators was estimated at over 1.5 million.

== Summary ==
American Galen Rupp won the men's race, holding off defending champion Abel Kirui. Rupp is the first American man to win this event since Khalid Khannouchi in 2002 and the first American-born man to win it since Greg Meyer in 1982. This was his first career win at a World Marathon Majors event. In a relatively tactical race, over 20 runners remained in the lead pack by the halfway point, which was reached in 1:05:49 hours. Kirui's quickening of the pace left only five men in contention at the 35 kilometres (22 mi) mark. Rupp then took the lead for good, finishing in a personal best of 2:09:20 hours. Kirui finished in second place around 30 seconds behind Rupp, while Bernard Kipyego finished in third around one minute behind Rupp.

Tirunesh Dibaba of Ethiopia won the women's race in 2:18:30 hours, which was the second fastest in Chicago Marathon history. Brigid Kosgei of Kenya placed second in 2:20:22 hours, which was her first top-three finish at a World Marathon Major. American Jordan Hasay finished third in 2:20:57, which was the second fastest time ever by an American woman in this race. Dibaba dominated the race. She led the race early on, with only Dibaba, Kosgei, Florence Kiplagat, Valentine Kipketer, and Hasay in the lead group at the 10 kilometres (6.2 mi) mark. Dibaba gradually pulled away from the other runners after the halfway point to win by almost two minutes. She stated that her goal in the future is to challenge the marathon world record.

The women's wheelchair marathon was won for a sixth consecutive time by American Tatyana McFadden in a course record of 1:39:15 hours – the same time recorded by runner-up Amanda McGrory who was a fraction of a second behind. Swiss athlete Marcel Hug took the men's wheelchair race in 1:29:23 hours, defending his title from the previous year and beating six-time champion Kurt Fearnley by over a minute.

== Results ==
The results were as follows.

=== Men ===
Position	Athlete	Nationality	Time
1st place, gold medalist(s)	Galen Rupp	United States	2:09:20
2nd place, silver medalist(s)	Abel Kirui	Kenya	2:09:48
3rd place, bronze medalist(s)	Bernard Kipyego	Kenya	2:10:23
4	Sisay Lemma	Ethiopia	2:11:01
5	Stephen Sambu	Kenya	2:11:07
6	Kohei Matsumura	Japan	2:11:46
7	Ezekiel Kiptoo Chebii	Kenya	2:12:12
8	Zersenay Tadese	Eritrea	2:12:19
9	Chris Derrick	United States	2:12:50
10	Michael Shelley	Australia	2:12:52

=== Women ===
Position	Athlete	Nationality	Time
1st place, gold medalist(s)	Tirunesh Dibaba	Ethiopia	2:18:30
2nd place, silver medalist(s)	Brigid Kosgei	Kenya	2:20:22
3rd place, bronze medalist(s)	Jordan Hasay	United States	2:20:57
4	Madaí Pérez	Mexico	2:24:44
5	Valentine Kipketer	Kenya	2:28:05
6	Lisa Weightman	Australia	2:28:45
7	Maegan Krifchin	United States	2:33:46
8	Alia Gray	United States	2:34:25
9	Taylor Ward	United States	2:35:27
10	Becky Wade	United States	2:35:46

=== Wheelchair men ===
Position	Athlete	Nationality	Time
1st place, gold medalist(s)	Marcel Hug	Switzerland	1:29:23
2nd place, silver medalist(s)	Kurt Fearnley	Australia	1:30:24
3rd place, bronze medalist(s)	Jordi Madera Jiménez	Spain	1:30:25

=== Wheelchair women ===
Position	Athlete	Nationality	Time
1st place, gold medalist(s)	Tatyana McFadden	United States	1:39:15
2nd place, silver medalist(s)	Amanda McGrory	United States	1:39:15
3rd place, bronze medalist(s)	Manuela Schär	Switzerland	1:39:17
