= 2015 Chicago Marathon =

Footrace held in Chicago, Illinois

38th Chicago Marathon
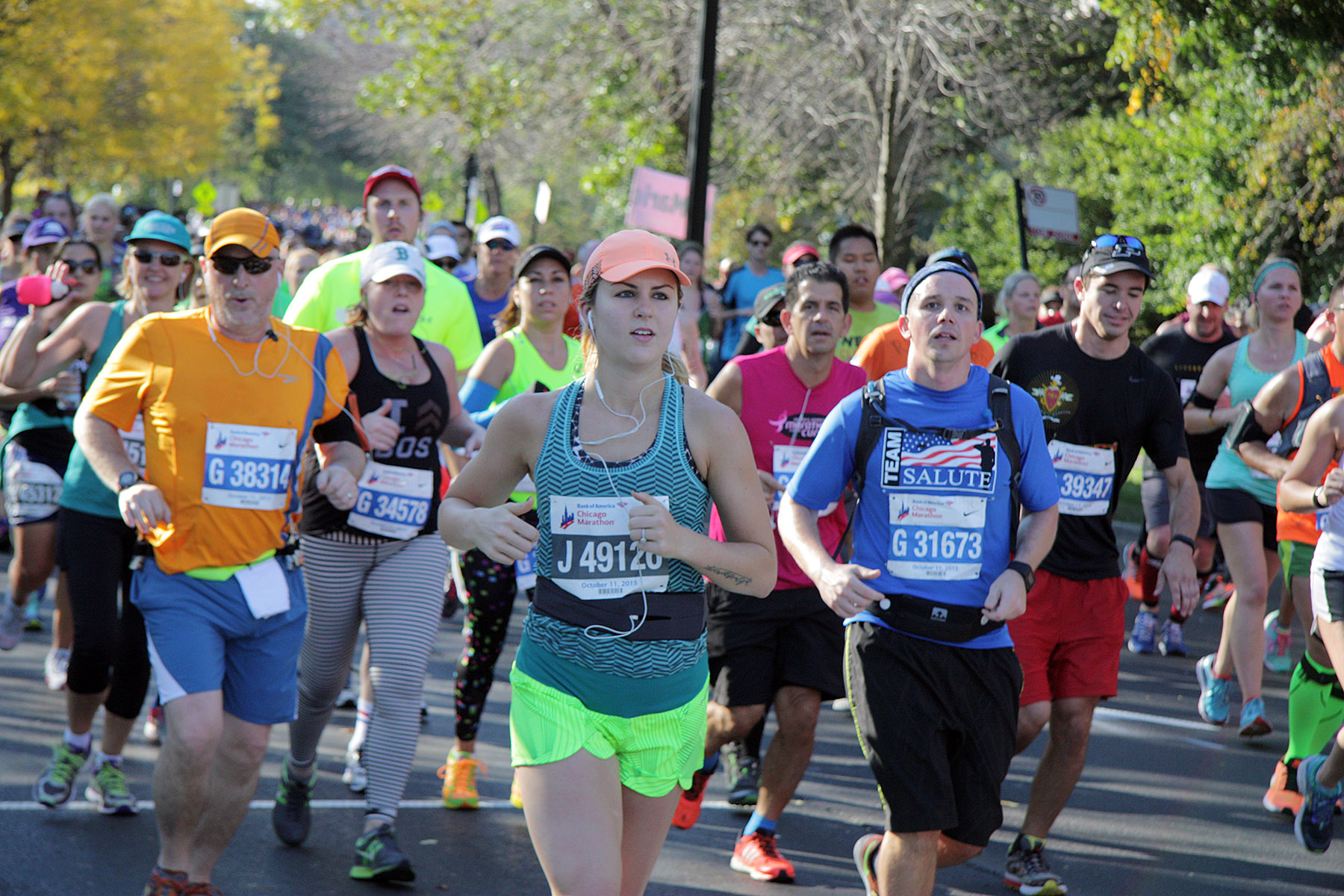
- Aid Station 04 of the Chicago Marathon (10/11/15)
- Venue: Chicago, United States
- Dates: October 11, 2015

Champions
- Men: Dickson Chumba (2:09:25)
- Women: Florence Kiplagat (2:23:33)

The 2015 Chicago Marathon was the 38th edition of the Chicago Marathon, held in Chicago, Illinois, on Sunday, October 11. The elite men's race was won by Kenyan Dickson Chumba in a time of 2:09:25 hours and the women's race was won by another Kenyan, Florence Kiplagat, in 2:23:33.

== Results ==
=== Men ===
Position	Athlete	Nationality	Time
1st place, gold medalist(s)	Dickson Chumba	Kenya	2:09:25
2nd place, silver medalist(s)	Sammy Kitwara	Kenya	2:09:50
3rd place, bronze medalist(s)	Sammy Ndungu	Kenya	2:10:06
4	Girmay Birhanu Gebru	Ethiopia	2:10:07
5	Luke Puskedra	United States	2:10:24
6	Wesley Korir	Kenya	2:10:39
7	Elkanah Kibet	United States	2:11:31
8	Lucas Rotich	Kenya	2:13:39
9	Abera Kuma	Ethiopia	2:13:44
10	Fernando Cabada	United States	2:15:36

=== Women ===
Position	Athlete	Nationality	Time
1st place, gold medalist(s)	Florence Kiplagat	Kenya	2:23:33
2nd place, silver medalist(s)	Yebrgual Melese	Ethiopia	2:23:43
3rd place, bronze medalist(s)	Birhane Dibaba	Ethiopia	2:24:24
4	Kayoko Fukushi	Japan	2:24:25
5	Mulu Seboka	Ethiopia	2:24:40
6	Meskerem Assefa	Ethiopia	2:25:11
7	Deena Kastor	United States	2:27:47
8	Diane Nukuri	Burundi	2:29:13
9	Jessica Draskau-Petersson	Denmark	2:30:07
10	Sara Hall	United States	2:31:14

=== Wheelchair men ===
Position	Athlete	Nationality	Time
1st place, gold medalist(s)	Kurt Fearnley	Australia	1:30:46
2nd place, silver medalist(s)	Marcel Hug	Switzerland	1:30:48
3rd place, bronze medalist(s)	Josh George	USA	1:30:48

=== Wheelchair women ===
Position	Athlete	Nationality	Time
1st place, gold medalist(s)	Tracie Majors	USA	1:41:10
2nd place, silver medalist(s)	Manuela Schär	Switzerland	1:41:56
3rd place, bronze medalist(s)	Chelsea McClammer	USA	1:50:02
