= Stephen Sambu =

Kenyan long-distance runner (born 1988)

Personal information
- Nationality: Kenyan
- Born: July 7, 1988 (age 37) Eldoret, Kenya

Sport
- Sport: Long-distance running
- Event: Road
- College team: University of Arizona

Stephen Sambu (born July 7, 1988, in Kenya) is a Kenyan long-distance runner who specialises in road running competitions.

== College career ==
Stephen Sambu ran for the University of Arizona, where he was coached by James Li, who is also Bernard Lagat's long-term coach. For the Arizona Wildcats he was runner-up in the 10,000 meters at the 2012 NCAA Division I Outdoor Track and Field Championships, runner-up at the 2012 NCAA Men's Division I Cross Country Championship, and a 9-time All-American. At Rend Lake College in Ina, Illinois, he captured 10 individual national championships, including two National Junior College Athletic Association (NJCAA) national cross country titles.

== 2013 season ==
He won the 2013 B.A.A. 10K.

== 2014 season ==
Sambu won the 2014 editions of the Falmouth Road Race, Cherry Blossom Ten Mile Run, B.A.A. 10K, and UAE Healthy Kidney 10K.

== 2015 season ==
He won the 2015 editions of the Great Manchester Run, Falmouth Road Race, Cherry Blossom Ten Mile Run.

== 2016 season ==
Sambu won the 2016 New York City Half Marathon. He also won the Bank of America Shamrock Shuffle 8k in Chicago.
