= 2018 Tokyo Marathon =

12th Tokyo Marathon
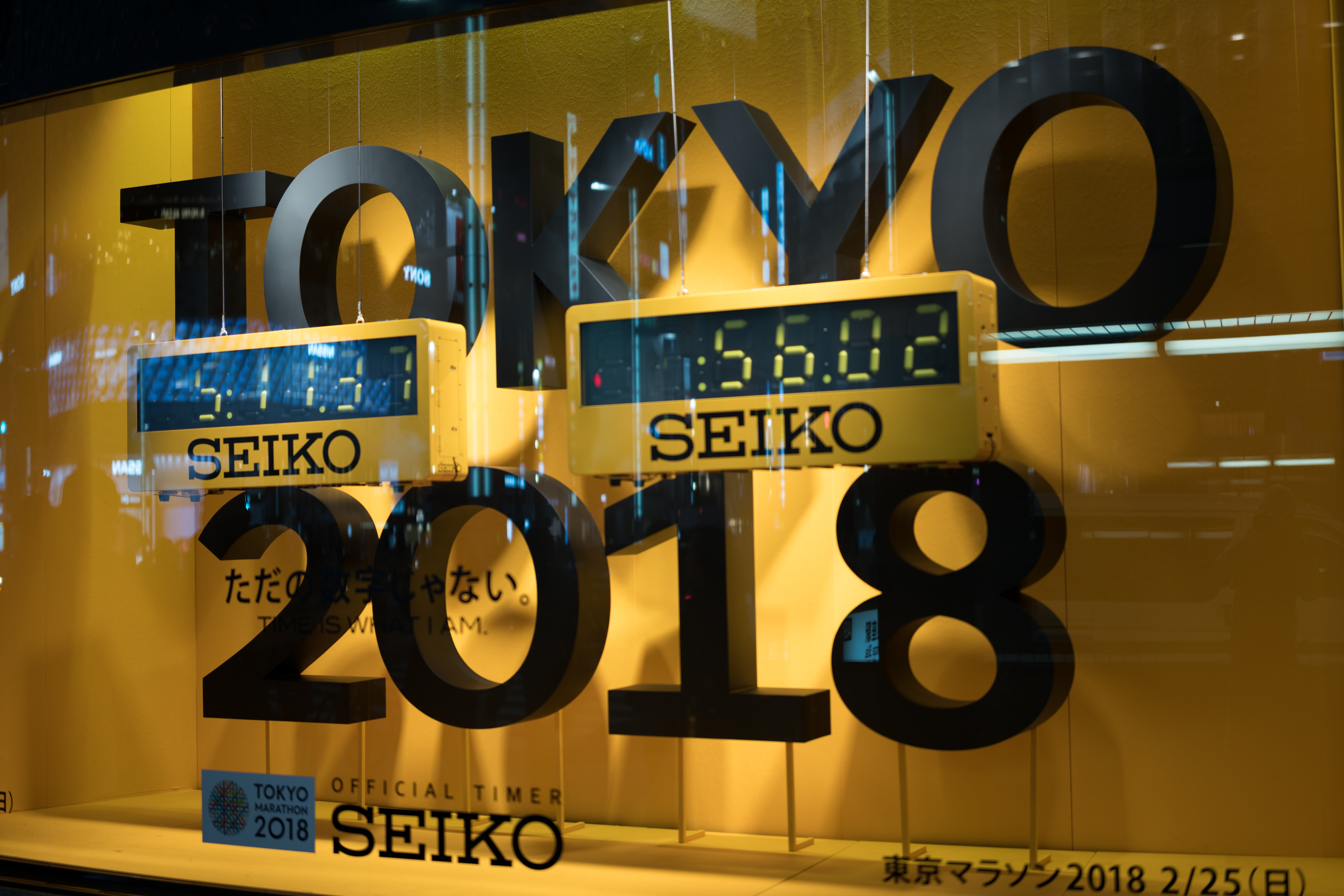
- Tokyo Marathon 2018
- Venue: Tokyo, Japan
- Dates: 25 February

Champions
- Men: Dickson Chumba (2:05:30)
- Women: Birhane Dibaba (2:19:51)

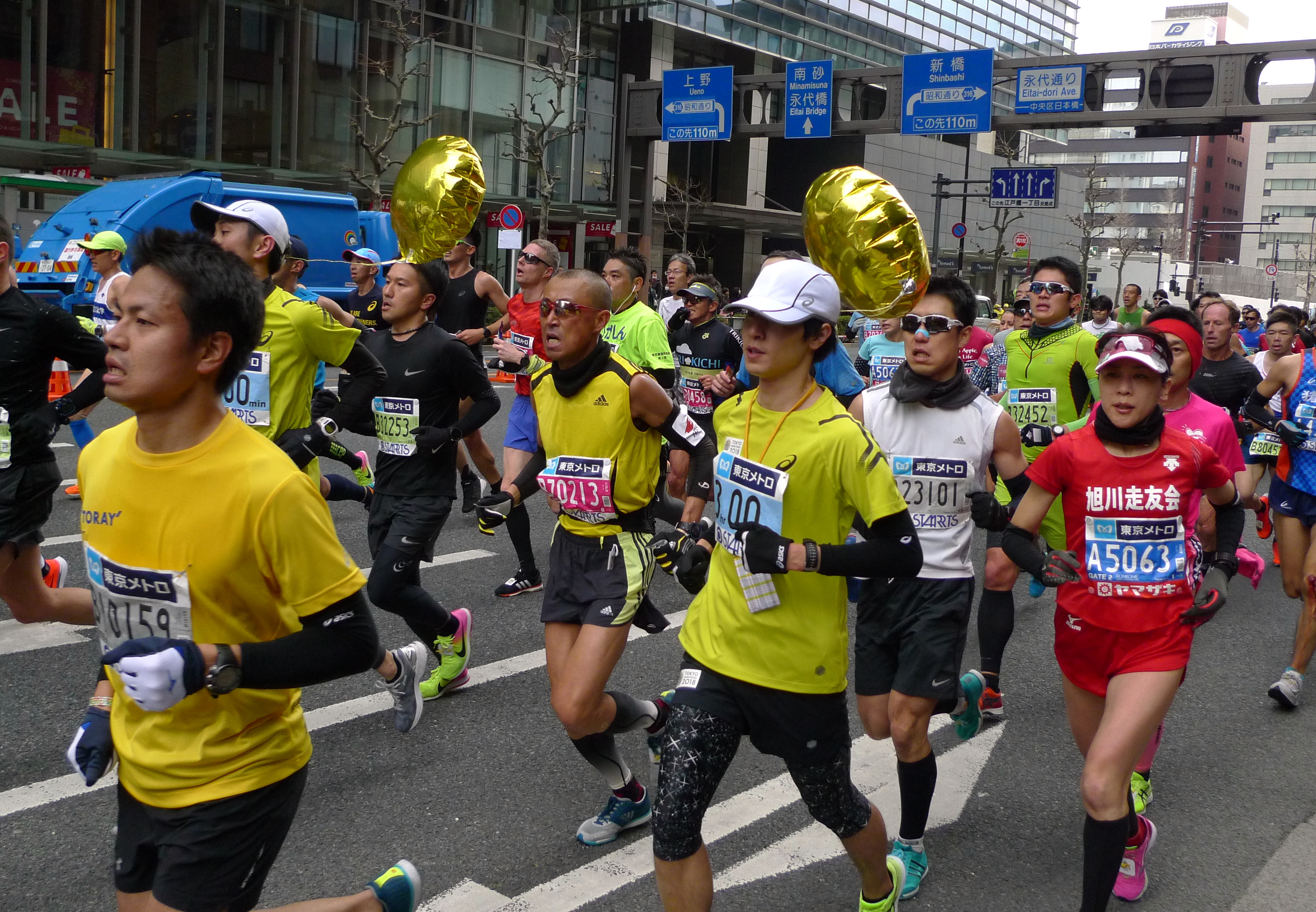
Fun runners at the marathon

The 2018 Tokyo Marathon (Japanese: 東京マラソン 2018) was the twelfth edition of the annual marathon race in Tokyo and was held on Sunday, 25 February. An IAAF Gold Label Road Race, it was the first World Marathon Majors event to be held that year. The men's race was won by Dickson Chumba in 2:05:30 hours while the women's race was won by Birhane Dibaba in 2:19:51. The men's runner-up Yuta Shitara set a Japanese national record time of 2:06:11 hours. This was also an Asian record. The host nation featured prominently in the men's race, with two runners in the top five and six of the top ten being Japanese. The Japanese women fared less well, with sixth-place Hiroko Yoshitomi being the best national performer (over ten minutes behind the winner).

Around 35,500 runners took part in the marathon races, with a further 500 taking part in a 10K run linked to the event. The public section of the race was oversubscribed 9 times over, with nearly 320,000 applications received. From an initial 35,911 starters, a total of 34,542 people finished the marathon distance, 7905 (23%) of which were women and 32 wheelchair racers. The event was broadcast live on television by Fuji TV and live radio commentary was provided by Nippon Broadcasting System. An exhibition about the race was held at Tokyo Big Sight in the three days proceeding the race.

== Race summary ==
Though the men's race was not as fast as the previous year, Chumba won the race in the second fastest time ever recorded at the event. Wilson Kipsang Kiprotich returned to attempt a title defence, and also a world record, but this proved too much for the athlete, who dropped out shortly after the 15 km mark. The leading men's group were paced through to the halfway point in 1:02:44. After the pacemakers dropped out, Chumba forged ahead with fellow Kenyans Amos Kipruto and Gideon Kipketer, though the latter two soon fell behind and Yuta Shitara had a late surge to overhaul them. After those four, Hiroto Inoue was the only other man to finish under two hours and seven minutes in fifth place – this was a new record in depth of performances at the race. Shitara's national record brought him a 100 million yen bonus (US$950,000) from the Japan Corporate Track and Field Federation as part of their "Project Exceed" initiative to improve performances in the build-up to the 2020 Tokyo Olympics. Inoue's sub-2:07 run was also worth a 10 million yen bonus.

The standard of the women's race was diminished by the absence of two major runners due to injury, Purity Cherotich Rionoripo and Meseret Defar. The gap in quality showed as five runners had built up a half minute lead by the first 5 km point – Ethiopians Birhane Dibaba, Ruti Aga and Shure Demise, plus American Amy Cragg and Kenya's Helah Kiprop. Kiprop drifted off the pack after 15 km, being 14 seconds in arrears when the other four women passed the halfway point in 1:10:19. Shure Demise was the next to go, falling behind by six seconds in the 25–30 km period of the race. The 30–35 km segment saw Cragg drop eight seconds back and Birhane Dibaba put clear distance between herself and runner-up Ruti Aga, eventually winning with nearly a minute and a half to spare.

In the wheelchair races, Hiroyuki Yamamoto and Tomoki Suzuki were dominant in the absence of Marcel Hug (flight cancellation) and it was Yamamoto who pipped his opponent to take the victory by a margin of one second in 1:26:23. A group of six racers remained in a pack further back, racing tactically some five minutes in arrears to the leaders. A sprint finish between them saw South Africa's Ernst van Dyk edge out Australian Kurt Fearnley by a fraction of a second to take third place. Six was the total number of entrants in the women's wheelchair race: Swiss Manuela Schär led the pace and pulled away from Tatyana McFadden and Amanda McGrory to win in 1:43:25 – over a minute and a half clear. McFadden took the runner-up spot and home athlete Tsubasa Kina pulled ahead of a fading McGrory to claim third.

== Results ==
=== Men ===
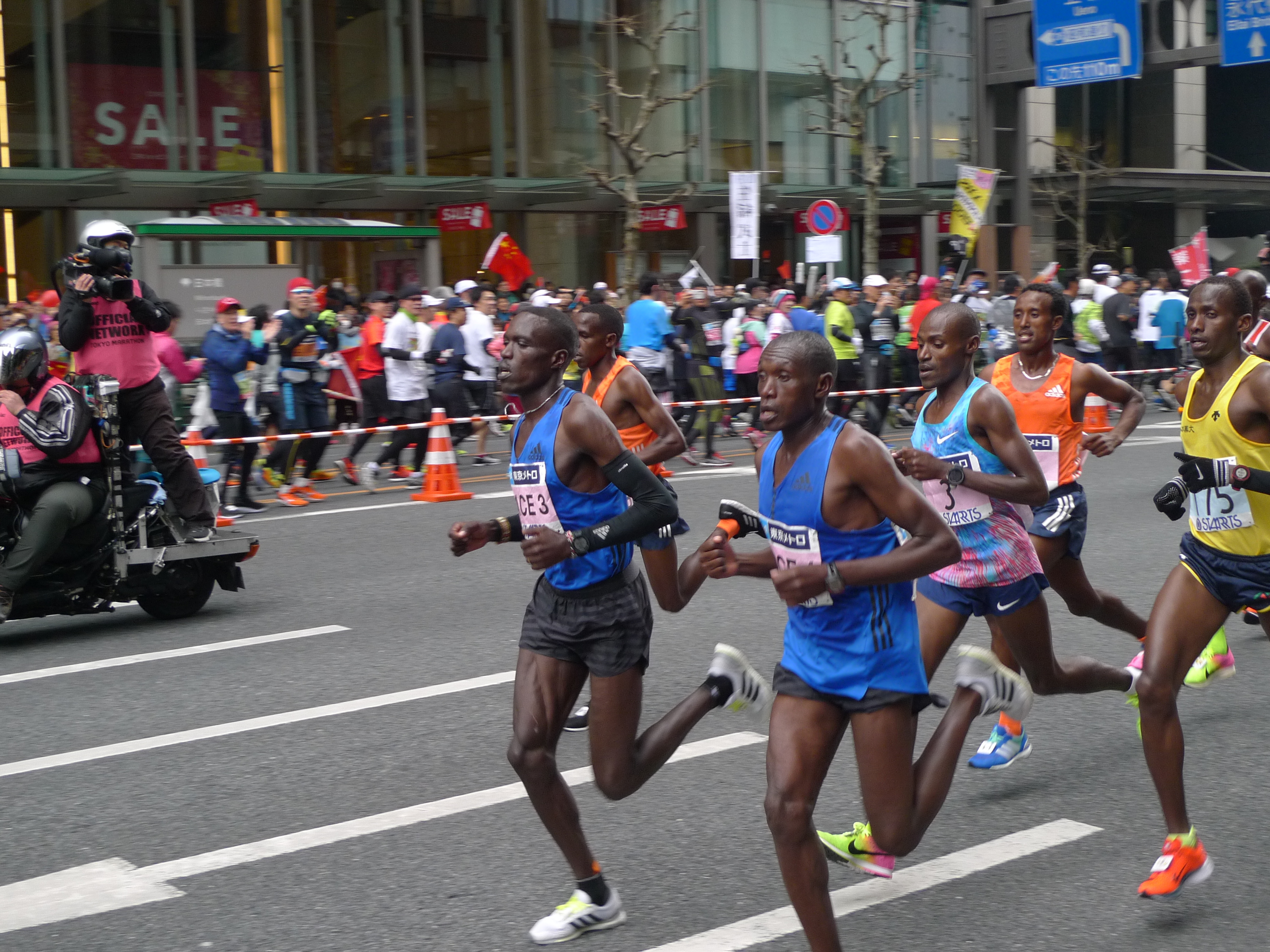
Chumba (in light blue) being led by pacemakers during the race

Position	Athlete	Nationality	Time
1st place, gold medalist(s)	Dickson Chumba	Kenya	2:05:30
2nd place, silver medalist(s)	Yuta Shitara	Japan	2:06:11 AR NR
3rd place, bronze medalist(s)	Amos Kipruto	Kenya	2:06:33
4	Gideon Kipketer	Kenya	2:06:47
5	Hiroto Inoue	Japan	2:06:54
6	Feyisa Lilesa	Ethiopia	2:07:30
7	Ryo Kiname	Japan	2:08:08
8	Chihiro Miyawaki	Japan	2:08:45
9	Kenji Yamamoto	Japan	2:08:48
10	Yuki Sato	Japan	2:08:58
11	Mohamed Reda El Aaraby	Morocco	2:09:18
12	Kohei Ogino	Japan	2:09:36
13	Tadashi Isshiki	Japan	2:09:43
14	Akinobu Murasawa	Japan	2:09:47
15	Simon Kariuki	Kenya	2:10:00
16	Asuka Tanaka	Japan	2:10:13
17	Hiroki Yamagishi	Japan	2:10:14
18	Daichi Kamino	Japan	2:10:18
19	Kengo Suzuki	Japan	2:10:21
20	Tsegaye Mekonnen	Ethiopia	2:10:26

=== Women ===
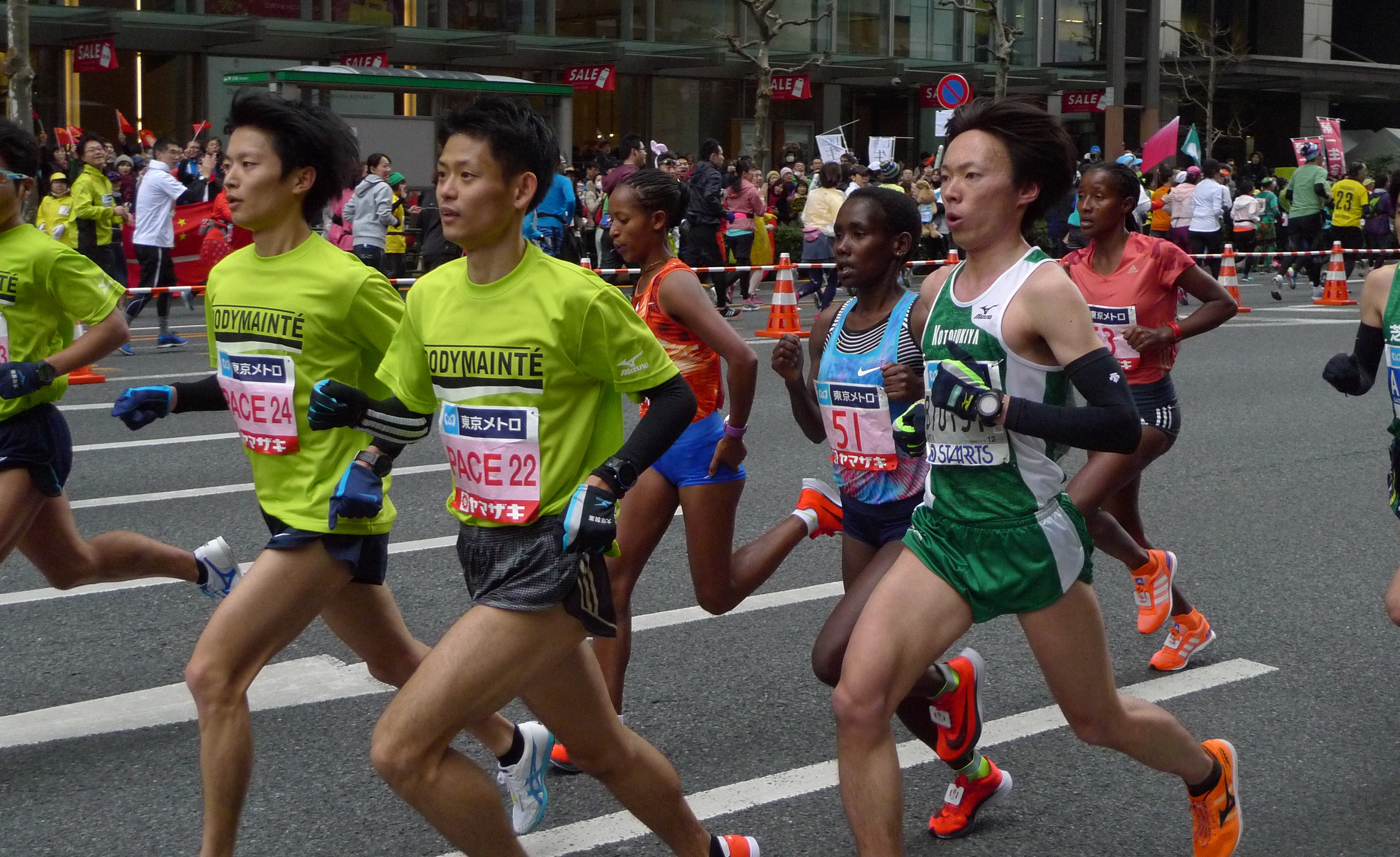
Leading women being led by male pacemakers

Position	Athlete	Nationality	Time
1st place, gold medalist(s)	Birhane Dibaba	Ethiopia	2:19:51
2nd place, silver medalist(s)	Ruti Aga	Ethiopia	2:21:19
3rd place, bronze medalist(s)	Amy Cragg	United States	2:21:42
4	Shure Demise	Ethiopia	2:22:07
5	Helah Kiprop	Kenya	2:28:58
6	Hiroko Yoshitomi	Japan	2:30:16
7	Madoka Nakano	Japan	2:31:41
8	Mao Uesugi	Japan	2:31:49
9	Marie Imada	Japan	2:32:00
10	Zhang Meixia	China	2:33:02
11	Asuka Yamamoto	Japan	2:34:26
12	Yoshiko Sakamoto	Japan	2:35:40
13	Nana Sato	Japan	2:37:34
14	Yumiko Kinoshita	Japan	2:38:51
15	Haruka Yamaguchi	Japan	2:39:42
16	Kasumi Takahama	Japan	2:39:49
17	Momoko Tanaka	Japan	2:42:09
18	Shinobu Ayabe	Japan	2:42:31
19	Minami Nakashima	Japan	2:43:16
20	Shiori Shimomura	Japan	2:43:27

=== Men wheelchair ===
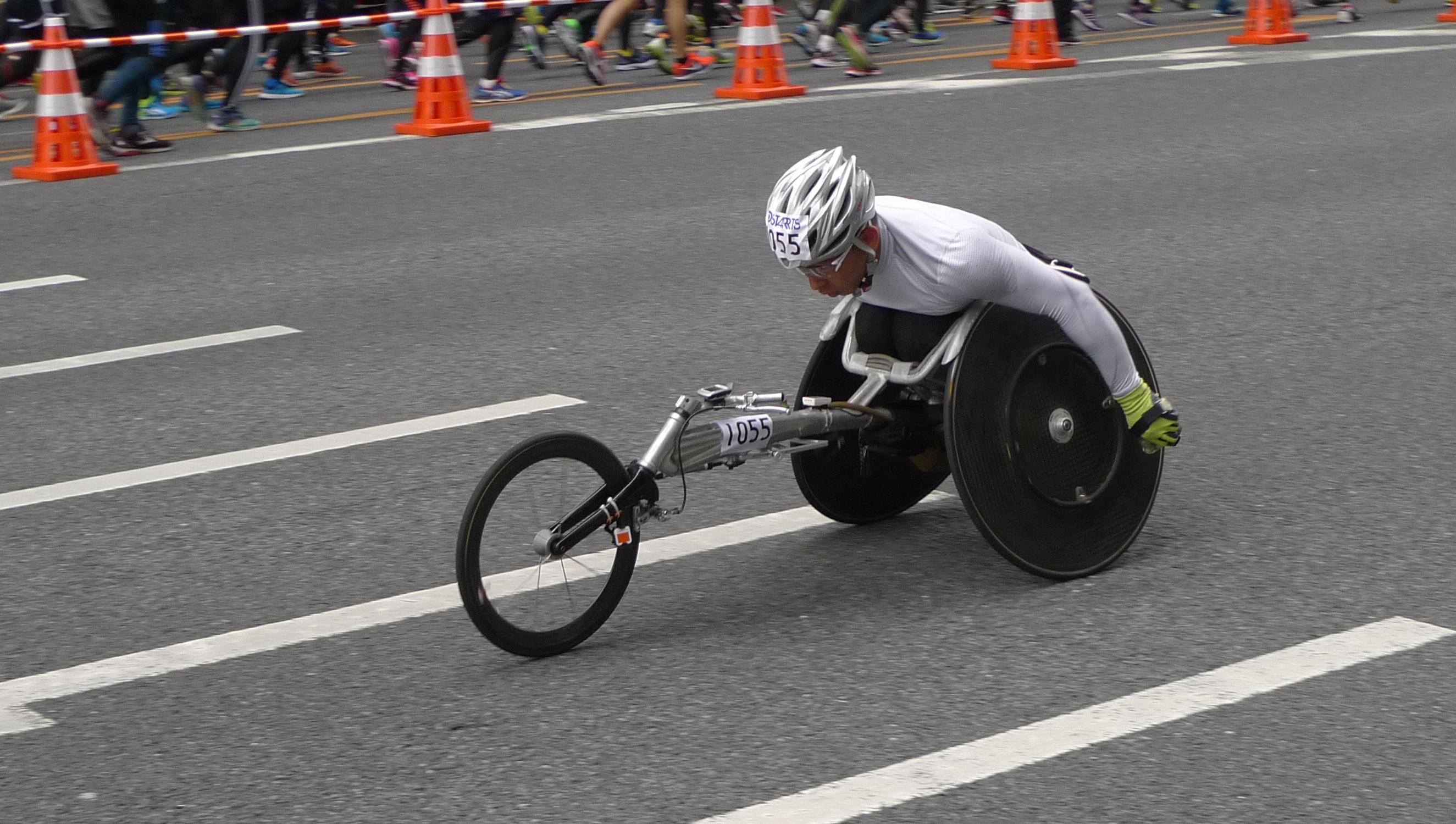
Japanese Seiji Tanaka racing in the wheelchair division

Position	Athlete	Nationality	Time
1st place, gold medalist(s)	Hiroyuki Yamamoto	Japan	1:26:23
2nd place, silver medalist(s)	Tomoki Suzuki	Japan	1:26:24
3rd place, bronze medalist(s)	Ernst van Dyk	South Africa	1:31:30
4	Kurt Fearnley	Australia	1:31:30
5	Sho Watanabe	Japan	1:31:31
6	Hiroki Nishida	Japan	1:31:31
7	Kozo Kubo	Japan	1:31:32
8	Ryota Yoshida	Japan	1:31:33
9	Masayuki Higuchi	Japan	1:31:36
10	Kota Hokinoue	Japan	1:31:40

=== Women wheelchair ===
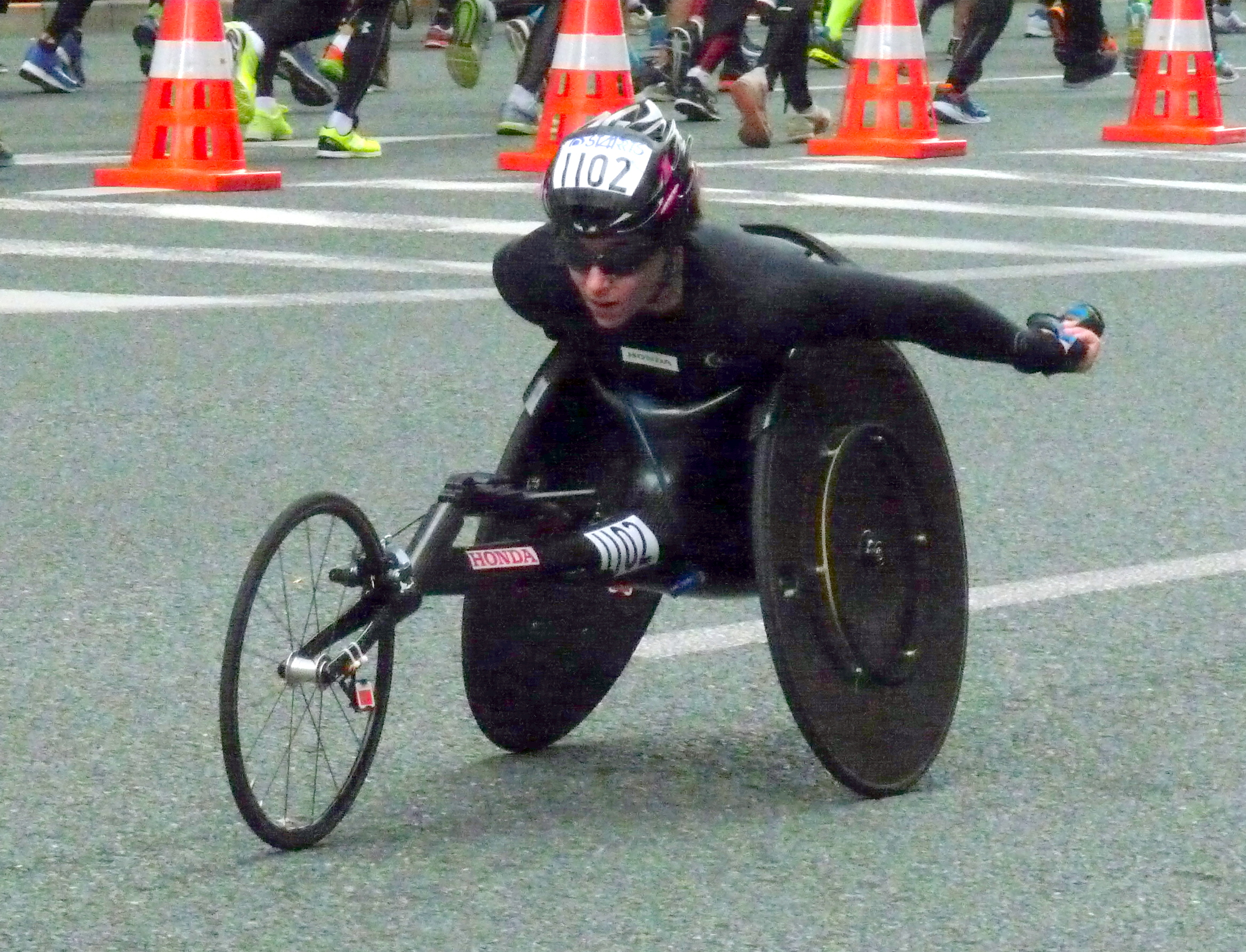
Amanda McGrory racing in Tokyo

Position	Athlete	Nationality	Time
1st place, gold medalist(s)	Manuela Schär	Switzerland	1:43:25
2nd place, silver medalist(s)	Tatyana McFadden	United States	1:44:51
3rd place, bronze medalist(s)	Tsubasa Kina	Japan	1:46:17
4	Amanda McGrory	United States	1:48:01
5	Susannah Scaroni	United States	1:54:02
6	Kazumi Nakayama	Japan	2:01:41
