= 2026 Chicago Marathon =

26.2 mi (42.195 km) race in Illinois, U.S.

48th Chicago Marathon
- Location: Chicago, Illinois, U.S.
- Dates: October 11, 2026 (4 days ago)
- Website: chicagomarathon.com

Champions
- Men: Amos Kipruto (2:01.09)
- Women: Hawi Feysa (2:13:33)
- Wheelchair men: Marcel Hug (1:21:34)
- Wheelchair women: Catherine Debrunner (1:33:16)

The 2026 Chicago Marathon is the 48th edition of the annual Chicago Marathon. The race is the sixth of seven World Marathon Majors held in 2026 and is a platinum-label race.

An estimated 55,000 people ran in Chicago for the 2026 annual marathon in temperatures which were slightly warmer than ideal. Amos Kipruto won his first Chicago marathon title in the men's race while Hawi Feysa repeated her victory from the previous year. American runner Emma Grace Hurley ran the fastest debut marathon in U.S. women's history. Both champions ran personal bests. In the wheelchair races, Marcel Hug captured his 42nd major victory and Catherine Debrunner her 14th major victory.

== Background ==
Thousands of hotel workers went on strike the Friday morning prior to the event demanding new contracts in anticipation of the unusually busy weekend. European record holder Bashir Abdi and last year's bronze medalist Alex Masai were forced to withdraw from the race ahead of race day. American Olympian Clayton Young decided to race despite a hamstring injury.

== Results ==
The Chicago Marathon began on October 11 at 7:30am.

=== Men ===
Elite men's top 10 finishers
Position	Athlete	Nationality	Time
1st place, gold medalist(s)	Amos Kipruto	Kenya	2:01:09
2nd place, silver medalist(s)	Tadese Takele	Ethiopia	2:02:56
3rd place, bronze medalist(s)	Milkesa Mengesha	Ethiopia	2:03:46
4	Jacob Kiplimo	Uganda	2:04:18
5	Boki Diriba	Ethiopia	2:05:01
6	Daniel Mateiko	Kenya	2:05:23
7	Clayton Young	United States	2:05:23
8	Charles Hicks	United States	2:05:35
9	Akira Akasaki	Japan	2:05:48
10	Vincent Mauri	United States	2:06:46

=== Women ===
Elite women's top 10 finishers
Position	Athlete	Nationality	Time
1st place, gold medalist(s)	Hawi Feysa	Ethiopia	2:13:33
2nd place, silver medalist(s)	Sharon Lokedi	Kenya	2:14:07
3rd place, bronze medalist(s)	Brigid Kosgei	Kenya	2:14:55
4	Mary Ngugi-Cooper	Kenya	2:17:23
5	Joan Kilimo	Kenya	2:18:38
6	Isobel Batt-Doyle	Australia	2:20:38
7	Emma Grace Hurley	United States	2:20:47
8	Degitu Azimeraw	Ethiopia	2:21:00
9	Magdalyne Masai	Kenya	2:21:11
10	Loice Chemnung	Kenya	2:21:19

=== Men's Wheelchair ===
Wheelchair men's race result
Position	Athlete	Nationality	Time
1st place, gold medalist(s)	Marcel Hug	Switzerland	1:21:34
2nd place, silver medalist(s)	Lito Anker	Netherlands	1:30:11
3rd place, bronze medalist(s)	David Weir	Great Britain	1:30:11
4	Tomoki Suzuki	Japan	1:30:16
5	Aaron Pike	United States	1:30:16

=== Women's Wheelchair ===
Wheelchair women's race result
Position	Athlete	Nationality	Time
1st place, gold medalist(s)	Catherine Debrunner	Switzerland	1:33:16
2nd place, silver medalist(s)	Tatyana McFadden	United States	1:42:01
3rd place, bronze medalist(s)	Manuela Schär	Sweden	1:42:01
4	Hannah Dederick	United States	1:47:12
5	Vanessa Cristina de Souza	Brazil	1:47:14
