= Amos Kipruto =

Kenyan long-distance runner (born 1992)

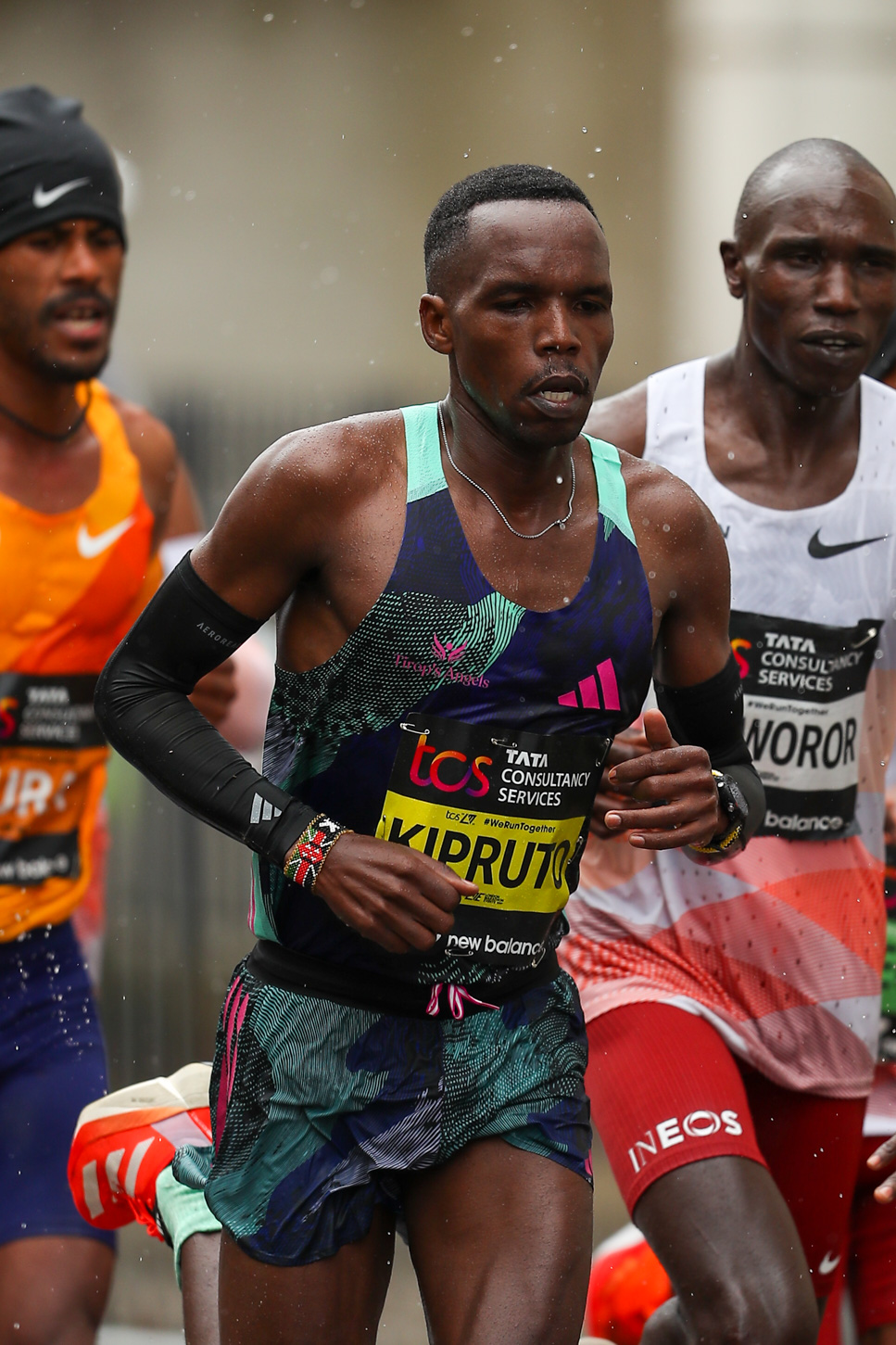
- Kipruto at the 2023 London Marathon

Personal information
- Nationality: Kenyan
- Born: 16 September 1992 (age 34)

Sport
- Country: Kenya
- Sport: Athletics
- Event: Long-distance running
Medal record
Men's athletics
Representing Kenya
World Championships
Bronze medal – third place	2019 Doha	Marathon
World Marathon Majors
Gold medal – first place	2022 London	Marathon
Gold medal – first place	2026 Chicago	Marathon
Silver medal – second place	2018 Berlin	Marathon
Silver medal – second place	2022 Tokyo	Marathon
Silver medal – second place	2025 Chicago	Marathon
Bronze medal – third place	2018 Tokyo	Marathon
Bronze medal – third place	2024 Chicago	Marathon

Amos Kipruto (born 16 September 1992) is a Kenyan long-distance runner. He won the bronze medal in the men's marathon at the 2019 World Athletics Championships. Kipruto took victory at the 2022 London Marathon. He won his second marathon major winning the 2026 Chicago Marathon.

== Career ==
In 2016, he won the Rome Marathon, and then the Seoul Marathon a year later.

In 2018, Kipruto earned two medals at the World Marathon Majors, finishing third in Tokyo with a time of 2:06:33 and second in Berlin with 2:06:23.

He claimed the bronze medal in the men's marathon at the 2019 World Athletics Championships held in Doha, Qatar.

Kipruto represented Kenya at the delayed 2020 Tokyo Olympics.

He came second at the postponed 2021 Tokyo Marathon in March 2022 in a personal best of 2:03:13, behind only Eliud Kipchoge, who ran 2:02:40. Kipruto secured the biggest win of his career up to that point by winning the 2022 London Marathon held in October with a time of 2:04:39.

Kipruto finished fourth in the 2026 London Marathon in 2:01:39, a personal best and an improvement of three minutes from his winning time in 2022. This performance, the joint-seventh-fastest marathon ever, made him the sixth-fastest male marathoner of all time. He followed this performance with his second major marathon victory at the 2026 Chicago Marathon where he ran another personal best of 2:01:09.

== Achievements ==
=== International competitions ===
Representing Kenya
Year	Competition	Venue	Position	Event	Time
2014	Istanbul 15K	Istanbul, Turkey	1st	15 km	44:03
2015	Adana Half Marathon	Adana, Turkey	2nd	Half Marathon	1:01:02
2015	Tarsus Half Marathon	Tarsus, Turkey	3rd	Half Marathon	1:03:03
2015	Lanling Half Marathon	Lanling, China	6th	Half Marathon	1:03:19
2015	Mersin 15K	Mersin, Turkey	1st	15 km	44:38
2016	Dubai Marathon	Dubai, United Arab Emirates	–	Marathon	DNF
2016	Paris Half Marathon	Paris, France	2nd	Half Marathon	1:01:09
2016	Rome Marathon	Rome, Italy	1st	Marathon	2:08:12
2016	Amsterdam Marathon	Amsterdam, Netherlands	13th	Marathon	2:09:08
2017	Dubai Marathon	Dubai, United Arab Emirates	–	Marathon	DNF
2017	Seoul International Marathon	Seoul, South Korea	1st	Marathon	2:05:54
2017	Göteborgsvarvet	Gothenburg, Sweden	2nd	Half Marathon	1:00:24
2017	Amsterdam Marathon	Amsterdam, Netherlands	5th	Marathon	2:05:43
2018	Kolkata 25K	Kolkata, India	3rd	25 km	1:15:52
2019	Prague Marathon	Prague, Czech Republic	3rd	Marathon	2:06:46
2019	World Championships	Doha, Qatar	3rd	Marathon	2:10:51
2019	Memorial Peppe Greco	Scicli, Italy	2nd	10 km	29:45
2019	BOclassic	Bolzano, Italy	3rd	10 km	28:37
2020	Valencia Marathon	Valencia, Spain	4th	Marathon	2:03:30
2021	Olympic Games	Tokyo, Japan	–	Marathon	DNF
2022	Göteborgsvarvet	Gothenburg, Sweden	1st	Half Marathon	1:00:50
2022	BOclassic	Bolzano, Italy	6th	10 km	28:37
2023	Bangsaen21 Half Marathon	Bang Saen, Thailand	3rd	Half Marathon	1:03:52
2024	10 km de Port-Gentil	Port-Gentil, Gabon	3rd	10 km	28:37
2025	Guadalajara Half Marathon	Guadalajara, Mexico	4th	Half Marathon	1:02:49
2025	Hamburg Marathon	Hamburg, Germany	1st	Marathon	2:03:46
World Marathon Majors
2018	Tokyo Marathon	Tokyo, Japan	3rd	Marathon	2:06:33
2018	Berlin Marathon	Berlin, Germany	2nd	Marathon	2:06:23
2020	Tokyo Marathon	Tokyo, Japan	18th	Marathon	2:08:00
2022	Tokyo Marathon	Tokyo, Japan	2nd	Marathon	2:03:13
2022	London Marathon	London, United Kingdom	1st	Marathon	2:04:39
2023	London Marathon	London, United Kingdom	–	Marathon	DNF
2023	Berlin Marathon	Berlin, Germany	7th	Marathon	2:04:49
2024	Chicago Marathon	Chicago, United States	3rd	Marathon	2:04:50
2025	Chicago Marathon	Chicago, United States	2nd	Marathon	2:03:54
2026	London Marathon	London, United Kingdom	4th	Marathon	2:01:39
2026	Chicago Marathon	Chicago, United States	1st	Marathon	2:01:09

=== Personal bests ===
- 10 kilometres – 28:37 (Bolzano 2019)
- Half marathon – 1:00:24 (Gothenburg 2017)
- Marathon – 2:01:09 (Chicago 2026)
