= 2025 New York City Marathon =

26.2 mi (42.195 km) race in New York, U.S.

54th New York City Marathon
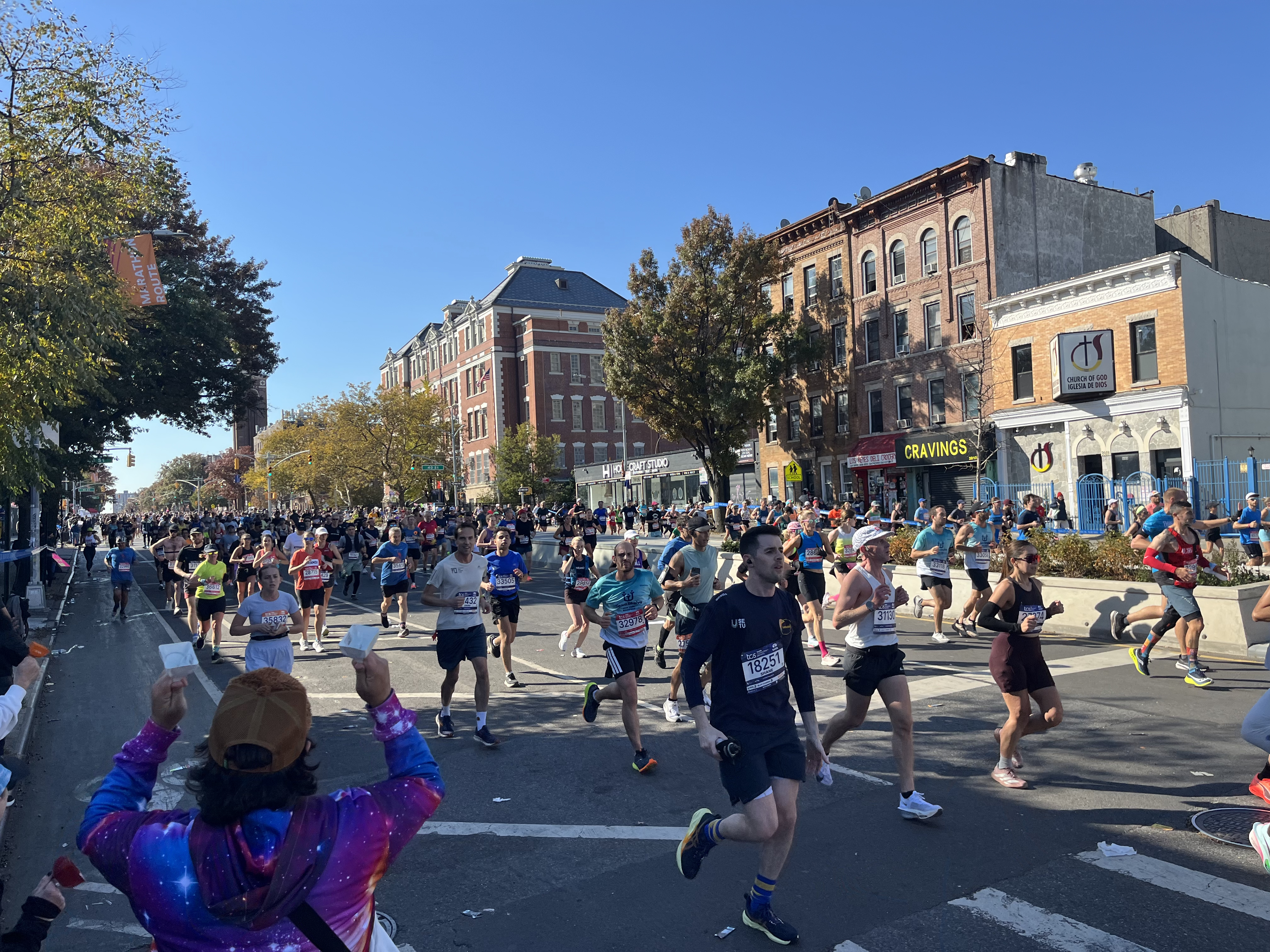
- 2025 marathon in Sunset Park, Brooklyn
- Location: New York City, New York, U.S.
- Dates: November 2, 2025 (11 months ago)
- Website: www.nyrr.org/tcsnycmarathon

Champions
- Men: Benson Kipruto (2:08:09)
- Women: Hellen Obiri (2:19:51 (CR))
- Wheelchair men: Marcel Hug (1:30:16)
- Wheelchair women: Susannah Scaroni (1:42:10)

The 2025 New York City Marathon was the 54th edition of the annual marathon race in New York City that took place on Sunday, November 2, 2025. The platinum-level race was the last of seven World Marathon Majors events of the 2025 calendar year.

59,226 runners completed the race. The marathon's main sponsor continues to be Tata Consultancy Services since 2014.

== Results ==
Benson Kipruto of Kenya won the men's race with a time of 2:08:09. The finish was the closest in race history, with compatriot Alexander Mutiso finishing second in the same official time, separated by just three-hundredths of a second (0.03s). American Joel Reichow was the top U.S. finisher, placing sixth in 2:09:56. Olympic champion Eliud Kipchoge finished 17th in 2:14:36, earning his Abbott World Marathon Majors Six Star medal.

Albert Korir originally completed a Kenyan podium sweep, finishing third in 2:08:57. Korir was banned by the Athletics Integrity Unit in 2026 for testing positive for CERA, a banned performance-enhancing drug. His results from October 3, 2025 were disqualified. Patrick Dever of the United Kingdom was upgraded to third.

Hellen Obiri of Kenya won the women's race with a time of 2:19:51, shattering the 22-year-old course record of 2:22:31 set by Margaret Okayo in 2003. Obiri became a two-time champion, having previously won in 2023. Compatriots Sharon Lokedi (2022 champion) and Sheila Chepkirui (2024 champion) finished second and third, respectively, with all three Kenyans finishing under the previous course record. Fiona O'Keeffe was the top American woman, placing fourth in 2:22:49, marking the fastest ever American women's time in New York City.

In the wheelchair divisions, Marcel Hug of Switzerland continued his dominance, winning a record-extending seventh New York title in 1:30:16. Susannah Scaroni of the United States successfully defended her women's title with a time of 1:42:10, claiming her third New York title.

=== Men ===
Elite men's top 10 finishers
Position	Athlete	Nationality	Time
1st place, gold medalist(s)	Benson Kipruto	Kenya	2:08:09
2nd place, silver medalist(s)	Alexander Mutiso	Kenya	2:08:09
3rd place, bronze medalist(s)	Patrick Dever	United Kingdom	2:08:58
4	Matthias Kyburz	Switzerland	2:09:55
5	Joel Reichow	United States	2:09:56
6	Charles Hicks	United States	2:09:59
7	Sondre Nordstad Moen	Norway	2:10:15
8	Tsegay Weldibanos	Eritrea	2:10:36
9	Joe Klecker	United States	2:10:37
10	Daniele Meucci	Italy	2:10:40

=== Women ===
Elite women's top 10 finishers
Position	Athlete	Nationality	Time
1st place, gold medalist(s)	Hellen Obiri	Kenya	2:19:51 CR
2nd place, silver medalist(s)	Sharon Lokedi	Kenya	2:20:07
3rd place, bronze medalist(s)	Sheila Chepkirui	Kenya	2:20:24
4	Fiona O'Keeffe	United States	2:22:49
5	Annie Frisbie	United States	2:24:12
6	Sifan Hassan	Netherlands	2:24:43
7	Jessica Warner-Judd	United Kingdom	2:24:45
8	Emily Sisson	United States	2:25:05
9	Amanda Vestri	United States	2:25:40
10	Fionnuala McCormack	Ireland	2:27:00

=== Wheelchair Men ===
Wheelchair men's top 10 finishers
Position	Athlete	Nationality	Time
1st place, gold medalist(s)	Marcel Hug	Switzerland	1:30:16
2nd place, silver medalist(s)	David Weir	United Kingdom	1:34:09
3rd place, bronze medalist(s)	Tomoki Suzuki	Japan	1:36:28
4	Jetze Plat	Netherlands	1:38:46
5	Evan Correll	United States	1:40:07
6	Miguel Jimenez Vergara	United States	1:43:02
7	Sho Watanabe	Japan	1:43:33
8	Joshua Cassidy	Canada	1:43:38
9	Johnboy Smith	United Kingdom	1:44:22
10	Jason Robinson	United States	1:46:16

=== Wheelchair Women ===
Wheelchair women's top 10 finishers
Position	Athlete	Nationality	Time
1st place, gold medalist(s)	Susannah Scaroni	United States	1:42:10
2nd place, silver medalist(s)	Tatyana McFadden	United States	1:47:54
3rd place, bronze medalist(s)	Catherine Debrunner	Switzerland	1:47:56
4	Manuela Schär	Switzerland	1:50:03
5	Hoda Elshorbagy	Egypt	1:57:47
6	Tsubasa Nakamine	Japan	1:59:28
7	Eden Rainbow-Cooper	United Kingdom	1:59:30
8	Vanessa de Souza	Brazil	1:59:38
9	Patricia Eachus	Switzerland	2:00:13
10	Christie Dawes	Australia	2:00:29
