= Sutume Kebede =

Ethiopian long-distance runner (born 1994)

Sutume Asefa Kebede
Personal information
- Nationality: Ethiopian
- Born: 11 December 1994 (age 31)

Sport
- Sport: Athletics
- Events: Marathon; 25K; 20K; half marathon; 15K; 10K
Medal record
World Marathon Majors
Gold medal – first place	2024 Tokyo	Marathon
Gold medal – first place	2025 Tokyo	Marathon
Silver medal – second place	2024 Chicago	Marathon
Bronze medal – third place	2020 Tokyo	Marathon

Sutume Asefa Kebede is a long-distance runner from Ethiopia. She won the 2024 Houston Half Marathon, the 2023 Kolkata 25K, the 2019 Beijing Marathon, the 2024 Tokyo Marathon and the 2025 Tokyo Marathon..

== Career ==
The first performance of Kebede that was recorded by the Association of Road Racing Statisticians is her victory at the 15K race at the Kerzerslauf in Kerzers, Switzerland, on 21 March 2015, which she finished with a time of 50:34.6.

Later in 2015 she won six races on six consecutive weekends, (Note: One of the races, the 15 km internationaux du Puy-en-Velay, was held on a Friday afternoon.) including the 10K event at the Paderborn Osterlauf in Paderborn, Germany, on 4 April with a time of 31:47,, (Note: Her gross time (or gun time) was 31:49.) the Lago Maggiore Half Marathon by Lake Maggiore in Italy, on 19 April with a time of 1:09:07, and the 25 Berlin, a 25K in Berlin, Germany, on 10 May with a time of 1:21:55. Her performance in the 25 Berlin was also an Ethiopian record at the time.

In January 2024 she became the fastest runner of any women's half marathon located in America, by winning the 2024 Houston Half Marathon with a time of 1:04.37.
