= Toledo Area Regional Transit Authority =

Public transit agency in Ohio, U.S.

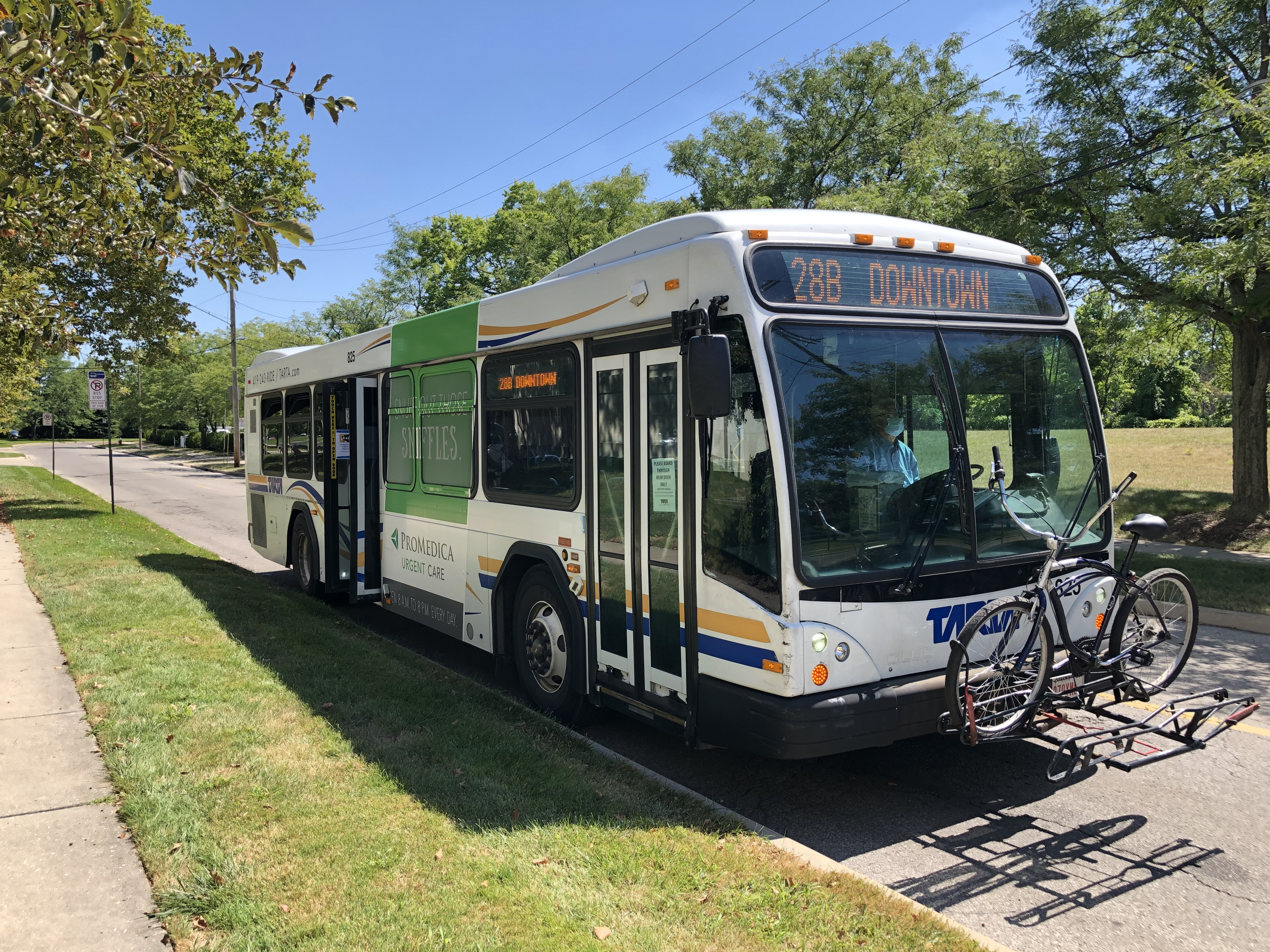
- Founded: 1971
- Headquarters: Toledo, Ohio
- Service area: Greater Toledo. U.S.
- Service type: bus service, paratransit
- Annual ridership: 2,148,041 (2024)
- Chief executive: Laura Koprowski
- Website: www.tarta.com

Toledo Area Regional Transit Authority (TARTA) is a public transit agency that has been operating in Toledo, Ohio since 1971. TARTA services 32 bus routes in and around the Toledo metropolitan area and carries approximately 2 million passengers every year. Every TARTA fixed-route bus is equipped with a bicycle rack, and each vehicle is fully accessible, including all of the vans in the on-demand TARTA Flex fleet. TARTA paratransit division, TARTA Move (formerly TARPS), has special buses designed especially for disabled riders, and has operated since 1989 in accordance with the Americans with Disabilities Act.

In August 2022, fare collection resumed at pre-COVID rates systemwide.

== Services ==
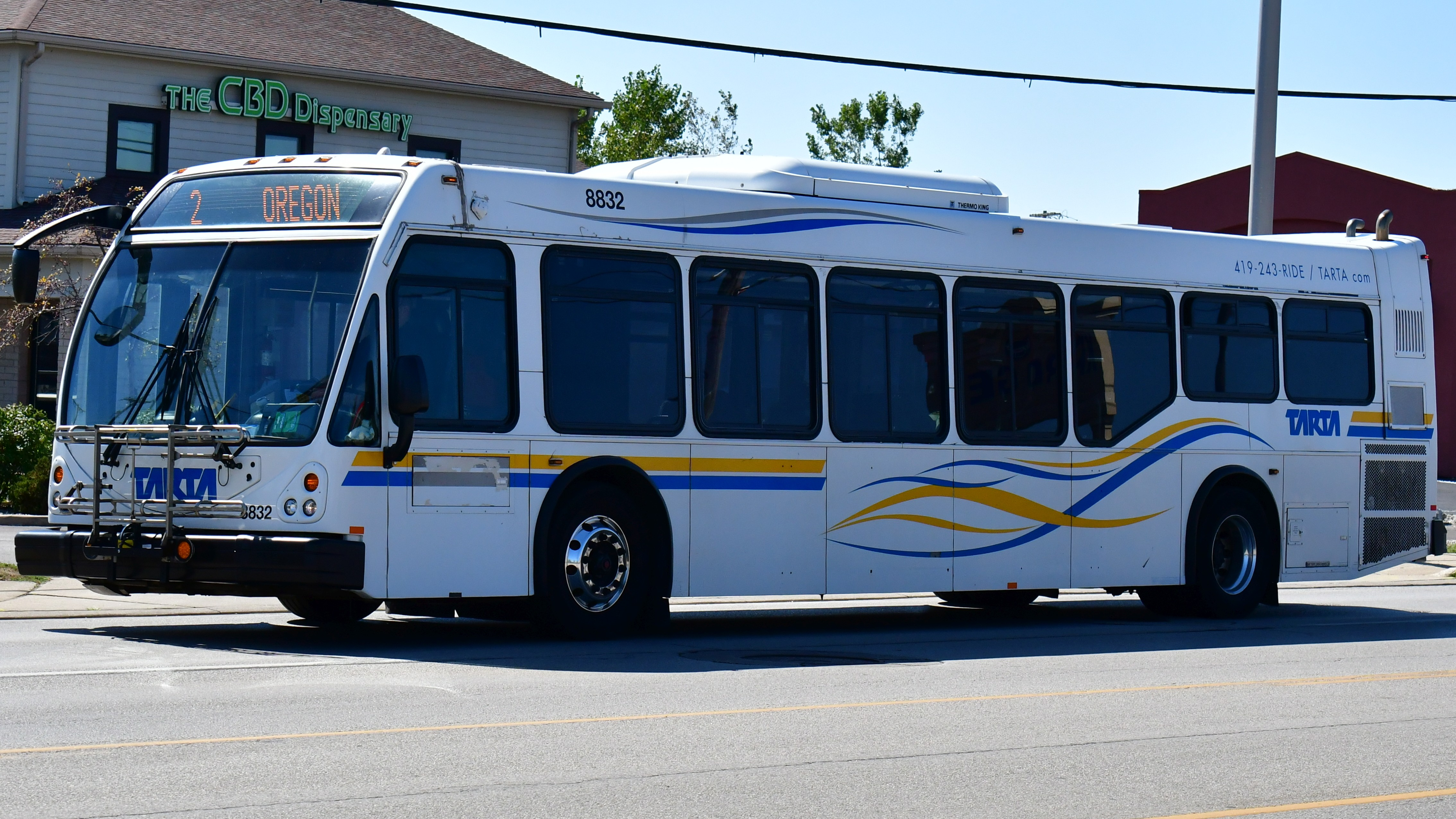
TARTA bus in Oregon

TARTA fixed-route buses have routes in Toledo, including Maumee, Ottawa Hills, Rossford, Sylvania, Sylvania Township, Holland, Springfield Township, and Oregon.

TARTA offers coverage to much of the rest of Lucas County through its on-demand service, TARTA Flex. Flex provides rides in accessible vans within transit zones, including:

- Northwest Zone: Toledo Express Eugene F. Kranz Airport, Holland, Ottawa Hills, Springfield Township, Sylvania Township
- Southwest Zone: Maumee, Monclova Township, Springfield Township, Waterville, Whitehouse
- East Zone: Rossford and Oregon

TARTA Flex rides can be requested within 24 hours of the trip or 30 to 60 minutes ahead of time. Rides can be requested through the TARTA Flex app or by calling TARTA.

TARTA Move's paratransit services help riders with disabilities and mobility challenges gain access to the community through the use of buses equipped with lifts, ramps and attentive staff. Those qualified for TARTA Move can request a ride anywhere in TARTA's service area if the pick-up point is within 3/4 of a mile of a fixed route stop.

TARTA also offers Special Event Transportation from certain locations to and from several events, including Toledo Mud Hens and Toledo Walleye games, Toledo Jeep Fest, Glass City JazzFest, and the Glass City Marathon.

== TARTA Zero ==
TARTA has set a goal of having a complete fleet of zero-emission vehicles on the road by 2040. The TARTA Zero program saw its first vehicles hit the road in 2024, with the introduction of five plug-in paratransit buses to the fleet at TARTA Move. In late 2025 and early 2026, TARTA is expecting delivery of 13 grant-funded, full-sized electric buses, which will be the first in the fleet. These vehicles are scheduled to replace TARTA's oldest diesel models. As of late 2024, TARTA's fleet included 70 full-sized buses, 34 paratransit vehicles, and 16 minivans for TARTA Flex.

== See also ==
- Toledo Amtrak station
