= Athletics at the 2017 Summer Universiade – Men's half marathon =

The men's half marathon event at the 2017 Summer Universiade was held on 27 August at the Taipei Municipal Stadium.

== Medalists ==
=== Individual ===
Gold	Silver	Bronze
Kei Katanishi; Japan	Naoki Kudo; Japan	Kengo Suzuki; Japan

=== Team ===
Gold	Silver	Bronze
Japan; Kei Katanishi; Naoki Kudo; Kengo Suzuki; Wataru Tochigi; Takato Suzuki	South Africa; Mokofane Kekana; Thabang Masihleho; Collen Mulaudzi; Marianio Eesou	Turkey; Sabahattin Yıldırım; Yusuf Alıcı; Aykut Taşdemir; Alper Demir; Vedat Günen

== Results ==
=== Individual ===
Rank	Name	Nationality	Time	Notes
1st place, gold medalist(s)	Kei Katanishi	Japan	1:06:09	
2nd place, silver medalist(s)	Naoki Kudo	Japan	1:06:23	
3rd place, bronze medalist(s)	Kengo Suzuki	Japan	1:06:56	
4	John Kateregga	Uganda	1:07:27	
5	Mokofane Kekana	South Africa	1:08:57	
6	Wataru Tochigi	Japan	1:08:59	
7	Byambajav Tseveenravdan	Mongolia	1:09:14	
8	Jānis Višķers	Latvia	1:09:16	
9	Chou Ting-yin	Chinese Taipei	1:09:17	
10	Sabahattin Yıldırım	Turkey	1:09:30	
11	Ranjeet Kumar Patel	India	1:10:04	
12	Takato Suzuki	Japan	1:10:23	SB
13	Thomas Huwiler	Switzerland	1:11:01	
14	Thabang Masihleho	South Africa	1:11:04	
15	Kantilal Devram Kumbhar	India	1:11:07	
16	Sergio Alejandro López	Colombia	1:11:14	
17	Dylan Evans	Australia	1:11:16	
18	Tian Huadong	China	1:11:26	
19	Collen Mulaudzi	South Africa	1:11:37	
20	Yusuf Alıcı	Turkey	1:11:47	
21	Choi Min-yong	South Korea	1:11:57	
22	Gantulga Dambadarjaa	Mongolia	1:12:15	
23	Jesús Arturo Esparza	Mexico	1:12:27	
24	Blair Morgan	Canada	1:13:17	
25	Aykut Taşdemir	Turkey	1:13:25	
26	Liu Tao	China	1:13:52	
27	Munkhbayar Narandulam	Mongolia	1:14:29	
28	Teng Hsin-chuan	Chinese Taipei	1:14:30	
29	Kim Tae-jin	South Korea	1:14:51	
30	Lee Jung-kook	South Korea	1:15:19	
31	Eric Rüttimann	Switzerland	1:15:24	
32	Marianio Eesou	South Africa	1:15:38	
33	Chen Ping-feng	Chinese Taipei	1:17:28	
34	Abdullah Al-Quraini	Oman	1:18:35	
35	Fortunate Turihohabwe	Uganda	1:18:58	
36	Wang Hao	China	1:20:17	
37	Kenneth Migadde	Uganda	1:21:24	
38	Timothy Ongom	Uganda	1:21:25	
39	Victor Leon	Colombia	1:22:08	
40	Suvragakhairkha Bold	Mongolia	1:29:57	
	Samuel Barata	Portugal	DNF	
	Thomas De Bock	Belgium	DNF	
	Alper Demir	Turkey	DNF	
	Vedat Günen	Turkey	DNF	
	Mikhail Krassilov	Kazakhstan	DNF	
	Saby Luna	Mexico	DNF	
	Boldoo Odbayar	Mongolia	DNF	
	Sadic Bahati	Uganda	DNS	

=== Team ===
Rank	Team	Time	Notes
1st place, gold medalist(s)	Japan	3:19:28	
2nd place, silver medalist(s)	South Africa	3:31:38	
3rd place, bronze medalist(s)	Turkey	3:34:42	
4	Mongolia	3:35:58	
5	Chinese Taipei	3:41:15	
6	South Korea	3:42:07	
7	China	3:45:35	
8	Uganda	3:47:49	
