= Tsubasa Kina =

Japanese wheelchair racer (born 1990)

Personal information
- Native name: 喜納翼
- Born: May 18, 1990 (age 36) Okinawa Prefecture, Japan

Sport
- Sport: Athletics
- Event: Marathon

Achievements and titles
- Paralympic finals: 2020, 2024
- Personal best: Marathon 1:35:50 (2019)
Medal record
Marathon
World Marathon Majors
Representing Japan
Bronze medal – third place	2018 Tokyo	Marathon
Gold medal – first place	2020 Tokyo	Marathon
Gold medal – first place	2021 Tokyo	Marathon

Tsubasa Kina (Japanese: 喜納翼, born 18 May 1990) is a Japanese wheelchair racer, who won the women's wheelchair race at the 2020 and 2021 Tokyo Marathons, and came third at the 2018 Tokyo Marathon. She is the national record holder in the women's wheelchair marathon, and competed at the delayed 2020 Summer Paralympics and the 2024 Summer Paralympics.

== Personal life ==
Kina is from Okinawa Prefecture, Japan. As a teenager, Kina played basketball. Whilst a student, Kina had an accident that forced her to use a wheelchair.

== Career ==
Kina competed in her first wheelchair marathon in 2013. In 2016, she won the women's race at the Oita International Wheelchair Marathon. In 2017, she won the 800 metres T54 event at the Arizona Grand Prix. Kina came third at the 2018 Tokyo Marathon, in a time of 1:46:17. In 2019, Kina set a personal best time of 1:39:36, which allowed her to qualify for the 2019 Tokyo Marathon. Kina did not finish the race due to a flat tyre. She later finished second at the 2019 Oita International Wheelchair Marathon, in a Japanese national record time of 01:35:50. She beat the previous record by over two minutes.

Kina won the women's wheelchair race at the 2020 Tokyo Marathon, in a time of 01:40:00. The women's wheelchair race had three competitors, and Kina took the lead at the start of the race, and maintained it throughout. It was her first victory at the event, and Kina's winning time was a course record. Part of the Tokyo Marathon course was used for the marathon event at the 2020 Summer Paralympics.

Kina qualified to compete in the marathon T54 at the delayed 2020 Summer Paralympics. At the Games, she finished seventh in the race. Kina won the delayed 2021 Tokyo Marathon; she was one of two finishers at the event.

Kina competed in the marathon T54 at the 2024 Summer Paralympics. She finished 12th in the race with a time of 2:04:53.
