= Catherine Debrunner =

Swiss Paralympic athlete (born 1995)

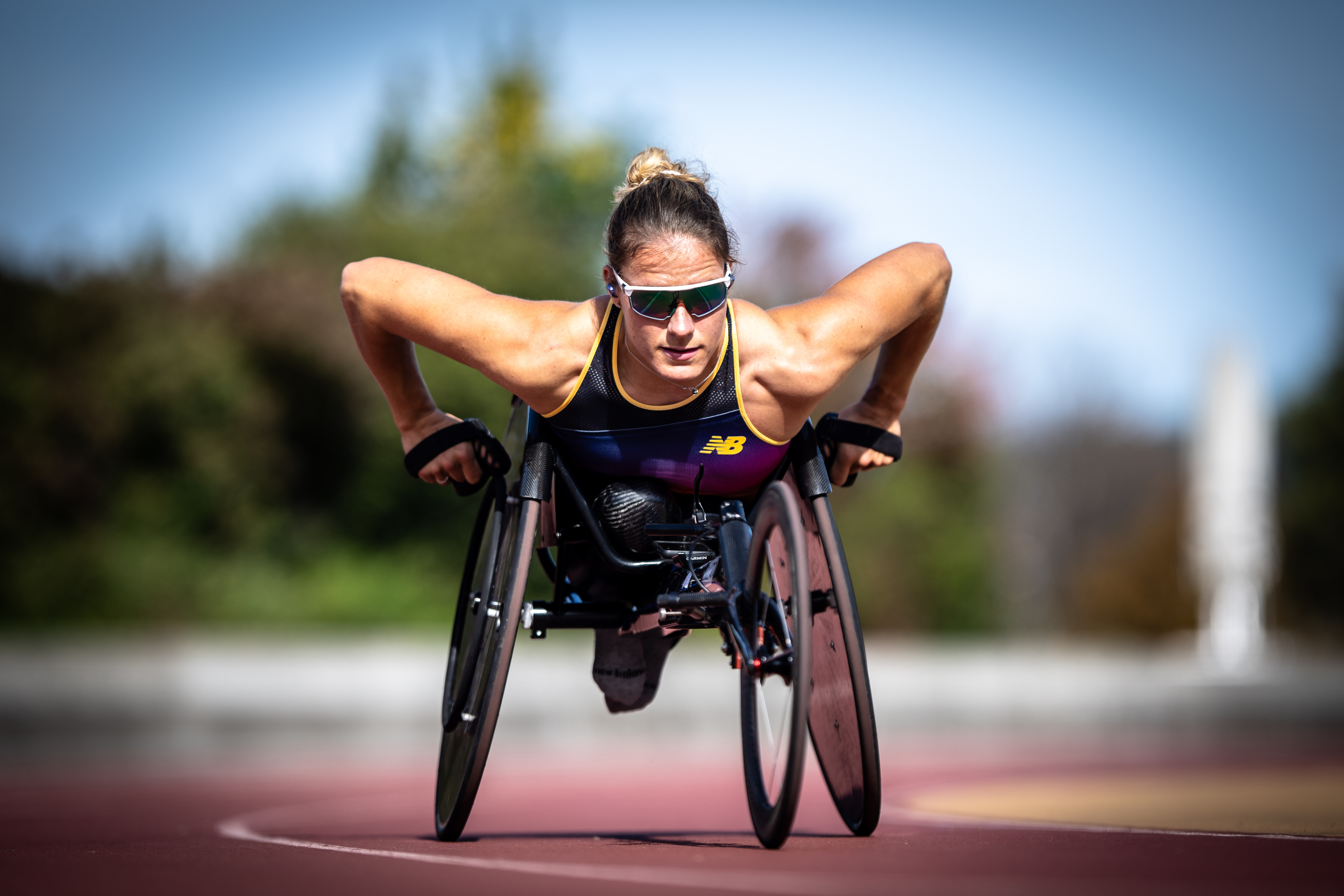
- Training von Catherine Debrunner in Nottwil

Personal information
- Nationality: Switzerland
- Born: 11 April 1995 (age 31) Mettendorf TG
- Education: Thurgau University of Education

Sport
- Disability class: T53
- Club: Red Velvet Racing Team
- Coached by: Arno Mul
Medal record
Women's para-athletics
Representing Switzerland
Paralympic Games
| Gold medal – first place | 2020 Tokyo | 400 m T53 |
| Gold medal – first place | 2024 Paris | 400 m T53 |
| Gold medal – first place | 2024 Paris | 800 m T53 |
| Gold medal – first place | 2024 Paris | 1500 m T54 |
| Gold medal – first place | 2024 Paris | 5000 m T54 |
| Gold medal – first place | 2024 Paris | Marathon T54 |
| Silver medal – second place | 2024 Paris | 100 m T53 |
| Bronze medal – third place | 2020 Tokyo | 800 m T53 |
World Championships
| Gold medal – first place | 2019 Dubai | 400m T53 |
| Gold medal – first place | 2023 Paris | 5000m T54 |
| Gold medal – first place | 2023 Paris | 400m T53 |
| Gold medal – first place | 2023 Paris | 800m T53 |
| Gold medal – first place | 2023 Paris | 1500m T54 |
| Gold medal – first place | 2025 New Delhi | 100m T53 |
| Gold medal – first place | 2025 New Delhi | 400m T53 |
| Gold medal – first place | 2025 New Delhi | 800m T53 |
| Gold medal – first place | 2025 New Delhi | 1500m T54 |
| Gold medal – first place | 2025 New Delhi | 5000m T54 |
| Silver medal – second place | 2015 Doha | 200m T53 |
| Silver medal – second place | 2019 Dubai | 800m T53 |
| Silver medal – second place | 2023 Paris | 100m T53 |
World Marathon Majors
| Gold medal – first place | Tokyo Marathon | 2025, 2026 |
| Gold medal – first place | London Marathon | 2022, 2024,2025, 2026 |
| Gold medal – first place | Berlin Marathon | 2022 , 2023, 2024, 2026 |
| Gold medal – first place | Chicago Marathon | 2023, 2024, 2026 |
| Gold medal – first place | New York City Marathon | 2023, 2026 |
| Silver medal – second place | Boston Marathon | 2025, 2026 |
| Bronze medal – third place | New York City Marathon | 2025 |
| Bronze medal – third place | London Marathon | 2023 |

Catherine Debrunner (born 11 April 1995) is a Swiss athlete competing in the T53 wheelchair division. She won five gold medals at the 2024 Paralympics in Paris including one for the T54 Marathon.

Since winning at her marathon debut in the 2022 Berlin Marathon, she has won at total of 15 World Marathon Majors.

She has competed for Team Switzerland since 2008 and has won multiple World- and European Championship medals, as well as Paralympic Medals.

== Early life ==
Debrunner was born on 11 April 1995 in Mettendorf, Switzerland. Due to a birth defect in her spine, she uses a wheelchair. While attending a sports camp in Nottwil, she met her future trainer and coach Paul Odermatt. Since 2021 she is coached by Arno Mul (NED).

== Career on the track ==
Debrunner made her international debut at the IWAS World Youth Games, New Jersey 2008 where she won 5 gold medals and was presented the "Athlete with International Potential" award.

Debrunner made her international senior debut at the 2013 IPC Athletics World Championships in Lyon. Her first World Championship medal she won in the T53 200 metres at the 2015 IPC Athletics World Championships, with a time of 30.64.
She qualified for the 2016 Summer Paralympics in Rio, where she finished seventh in the Women's 400 metres.

Debrunner subsequently took a break from sports to focus on her education before returning to Team Switzerland for the 2019 World Para Athletics Championships. In Dubai, she earned a gold medal in the Women's 400m T53 and a silver medal in the women's 800m T53 race.
At the 2023 World Para Athletics Championships Debrunner won 4 golds in the 400m 800m, 1500m and 5000m. She also added one silver medal by finishing second behind Sammi Kinghorn.
At the 2025 World Para Athletics Championships Debrunner won every event she entered, claiming 5 golds. (100m, 400m, 800m, 1500m, 5000m)

Her first Paralympic Medal Debrunner won in Tokyo 2020 at the Athletics at the 2020 Summer Paralympics – Women's 800 metres T53. She finished 3rd behind Madison de Rozario and Zhou Hongzhuan. Her first Gold medal came in the Athletics at the 2020 Summer Paralympics – Women's 400 metres T53 where she beat Samantha Kinghorn and Zhou Hongzhuan.
She won five gold medals and a silver at the 2024 Paralympics in Paris. Including a gold for the T54 Marathon which she led from start. The Australian Madison de Rozario came second and the American Susannah Scaroni had the bronze medal.

== Career on the road ==
When the 2022 World Championships were cancelled, Debrunner looked for a new challenge. She decided to focus on marathons for the rest of that year. At the 2022 Berlin Marathon, Debrunner, competing in her first marathon, won the race with a time of 1:36:47, breaking Manuela Schär's streak of five Berlin Marathon wins. She went on to win the 2022 London Marathon a week later.

In 2023, Debrunner set the world record at the 2023 Berlin Marathon with a time of 1:34:16 and made her U.S. race debut in the 2023 Chicago Marathon in October. During the Chicago marathon, Debrunner set a new course record with a time of 1:38:44. She also won the 2023 New York City Marathon, setting a course record with a time of 1:39:32,

In 2024 she won the 2024 London Marathon, the 2024 Berlin Marathon and the 2024 Chicago Marathon.

In 2025 Debrunner won the 2025 Tokyo Marathon and the 2025 London Marathon and finished 2nd in the 2025 Boston Marathon behind Susannah Scaroni. In the 2025 New York City Marathon she finished as third, closely behind Tatyana McFadden.

In 2026 Debrunner won the 2026 Tokyo Marathon, the 2026 London Marathon, the 2026 Berlin Marathon and came second in the 2026 Boston Marathon..
During the 2026 Chicago Marathon Debrunner finished as the winner in a World Record time of 1:33:16, bettering her previous record (Berlin 2023) with 1 minute. In the 2026 New York City Marathon Debrunner finished as winner, over 8 minutes ahead of Tatyana McFadden and Susannah Scaroni.

So far Debrunner has started in 20 World Marathon Majors winning 15 times, 2x second, 2x third and finish 6th one time.

Debrunner won in 2023, 2024 and 2026 the overall ranking in World Marathon Majors.

Debrunner holds 9 WPA world records. She holds the 100m T53, 200m T53, 400m T53, 800m T53, 1500m T53/T54 and 5000m T53/T54 on the track. On the road she holds the World Records in 10k, half marathon and marathon.

== Laureus World Sportsaward ==
In May 2023, Debrunner was awarded the Laureus World Sports Award for Sportsperson of the Year with a Disability.

In 2025 Debrunner was also nominated for this award.

== Personal bests ==
As of November 3rd, 2026

| Event | Performance | Location | Date |
|---|---|---|---|
| 100 metres | 15,20 (+0.1 m/s) ^{[a]} | Nottwil | May 24, 2025 |
| 200 metres | 26,44 (+0.0 m/s) ^{[a]} | Nottwil | May 21, 2026 |
| 400 metres | 49,02 ^{[a]} | Arbon | May 31, 2025 |
| 800 metres | 1:37,96 ^{[a]} | Sharjah | February 4, 2024 |
| 1500 metres | 3:02,26 ^{[a]} | Arbon | May 31, 2025 |
| 5000 metres | 10:24,36 ^{[a]} | Nottwil | June 1, 2025 |
| 10k road | 21:21,0 ^{[a]} | Ōita (city) | November 17, 2024 |
| Half marathon | 46:51 ^{[a]} | Ōita (city) | November 19, 2023 |
| Marathon | 1:33:16 ^{[a]} | Chicago | September 24, 2023 |

^{a} World record
