= Vincent Mauri =

American distance runner (born 2001)

Personal information
- Born: January 19, 2001 (age 25) Warren, Ohio, United States

Sport
- Country: United States
- Events: Marathon, half marathon
- College team: Arizona State University, University of Notre Dame
- Team: ASICS

Achievements and titles
- Personal best: Marathon: 2:05:54

Vincent Mauri (born 19 January 2001) is an American distance runner. In April 2026, he ran the fastest debut marathon of any American in history. Mauri runs professionally for ASICS.

== High school and college ==
Mauri attended Howland High School in Warren, Ohio, where he was the Ohio state champion at 3200 meters on the track. Mauri ran collegiately for Arizona State University, where he placed 87th at the 2022 NCAA Cross Country Championship and 18th at the 2022 NCAA Outdoor Track and Field Championship in the 5,000 meters. Mauri also competed for one year in the ACC for Notre Dame, where he ran a personal-best 5,000 meter time of 13:34.

== Career ==
Mauri transitioned to marathon training immediately after college. He coached himself and logged 100 mile training weeks predominately on treadmills. In April 2026, Mauri debuted in the marathon at the Glass City Marathon in Toledo, Ohio. He won the race in a time of 2:05:54, which is the fastest debut marathon and the fourth-fastest overall time for an American.

In training, Mauri routinely runs over 130 miles per week, with a large proportion of mileage on treadmills at Planet Fitness. He has run up to 45 miles in a single day during a marathon workout session. Prior to his World Marathon Major debut at the 2026 Chicago Marathon, Mauri signed a professional contract with ASICS.

At the 2026 Chicago Marathon, Mauri ran 2:06:45 to place tenth overall and third among Americans, behind Clayton Young and Charles Hicks. Mauri was on pace to break the American record through 18 miles before having to stop to stretch his hamstrings.
