= 2021 Tokyo Marathon =

Marathon race in Tokyo, Japan

- Location: Tokyo, Japan
- Dates: 6 March 2022
- Competitors: c. 20,000

Champions
- Men: Eliud Kipchoge (2:02:40)
- Women: Brigid Kosgei (2:16:02)
- Wheelchair men: Marcel Hug (01:22:16)
- Wheelchair women: Tsubasa Kina (01:40:21)

The 2021 Tokyo Marathon (Japanese: 東京マラソン2021) was the fifteenth edition of the annual marathon race in Tokyo. The competition was held on Sunday 6 March 2022, having been postponed twice due to the COVID-19 pandemic. The elite events were won by Kenyans Eliud Kipchoge and Brigid Kosgei respectively, whilst the wheelchair races were won by Swiss athlete Marcel Hug and Japanese competitor Tsubasa Kina. Around 20,000 people competed in the mass participation event.

== Background ==
In October 2020, the 2021 Tokyo Marathon was postponed from its usual date in March to October, due to the COVID-19 pandemic. In September 2021, the event was postponed again, with the new date being 6 March 2022. As a consequence of this postponement, the 2022 Tokyo Marathon was cancelled, and the Tokyo Marathon was the only one of the World Marathon Majors that did not happen in 2021.

Due to the COVID-19 pandemic, international competitors were not permitted in the mass participation event. All competitors were required to either be double-vaccinated or have a negative result from a PCR test. Slight alterations were made to the course from previous years due to building works near Iidabashi and on National Route 15.

== Competitors ==
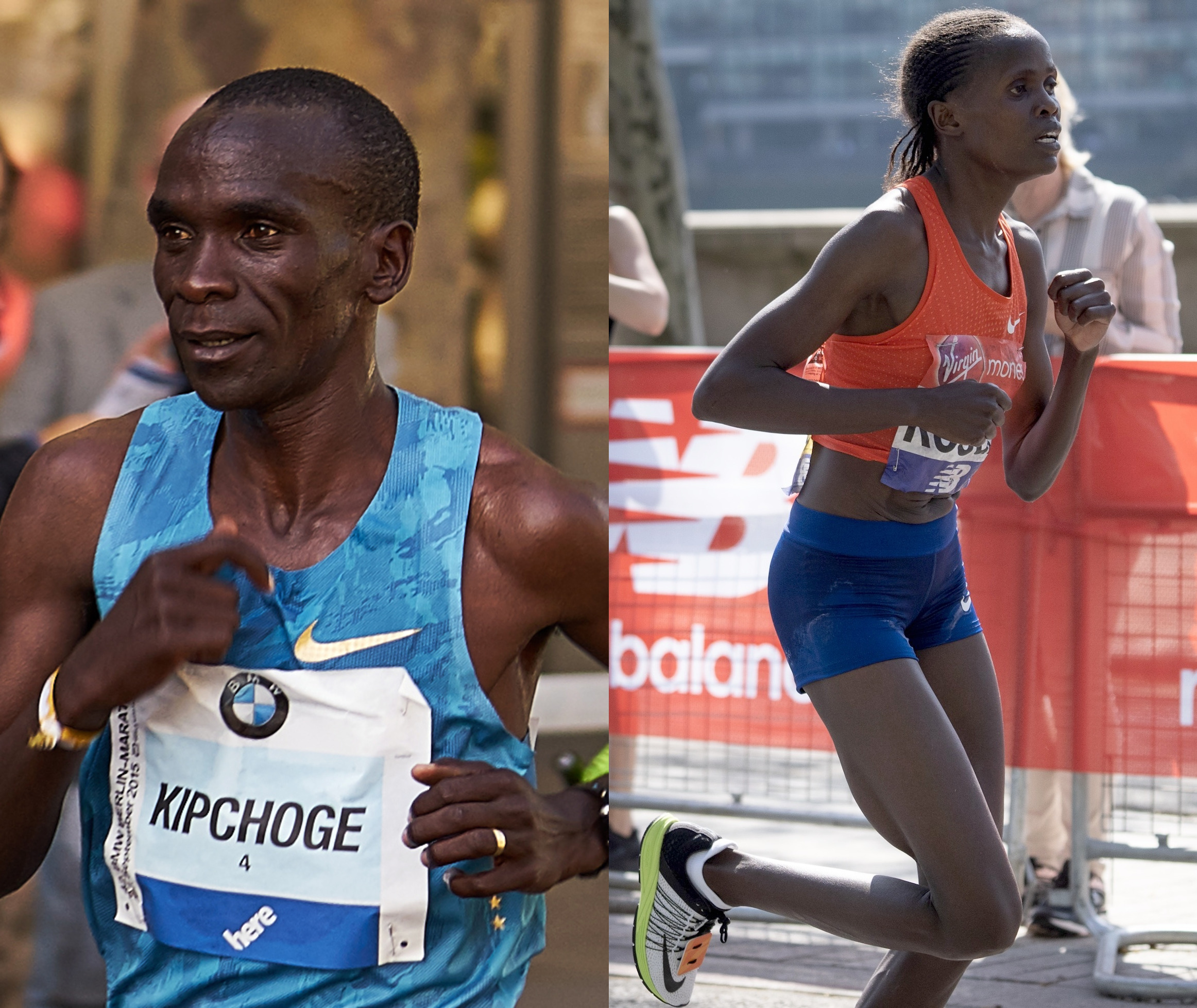
Eliud Kipchoge and Brigid Kosgei won the 2021 Tokyo Marathon elite races.

The elite men's race featured Eliud Kipchoge, who won the marathon event at the delayed 2020 Summer Olympics. It was his first competitive race since the Olympics. Other competitors included 2020 winner Legese Birhanu, as well as Mosinet Geremew, Amos Kipruto and Tamirat Tola, all of whom had a personal best time under 2:04, and Shura Kitata, who won the 2020 London Marathon. Japanese athlete and national record holder Kengo Suzuki who came fourth at the 2021 Chicago Marathon, also raced.

The favourite for the elite women's race was Brigid Kosgei, who came second in the marathon event at the delayed 2020 Summer Olympics. Other competitors with a personal best under 2:20 were Angela Tanui, Ashete Bekere and Hiwot Gebrekidan. American Sara Hall raced, as did Japanese athlete Mao Ichiyama.

Due to the COVID-19 pandemic, there were fewer international athletes in the wheelchair events; over 80% of competitors were Japanese. The men's wheelchair competition featured Swiss athlete Marcel Hug, who won the marathon T54 race at the delayed 2020 Summer Paralympics. Other competitors included Briton Johnboy Smith and Tomoki Suzuki, who was the only Japanese competitor in the Paralympic T54 marathon event. The women's wheelchair race featured two competitors: 2020 winner Tsubasa Kina and Wakako Tsuchida.

== Race summary ==
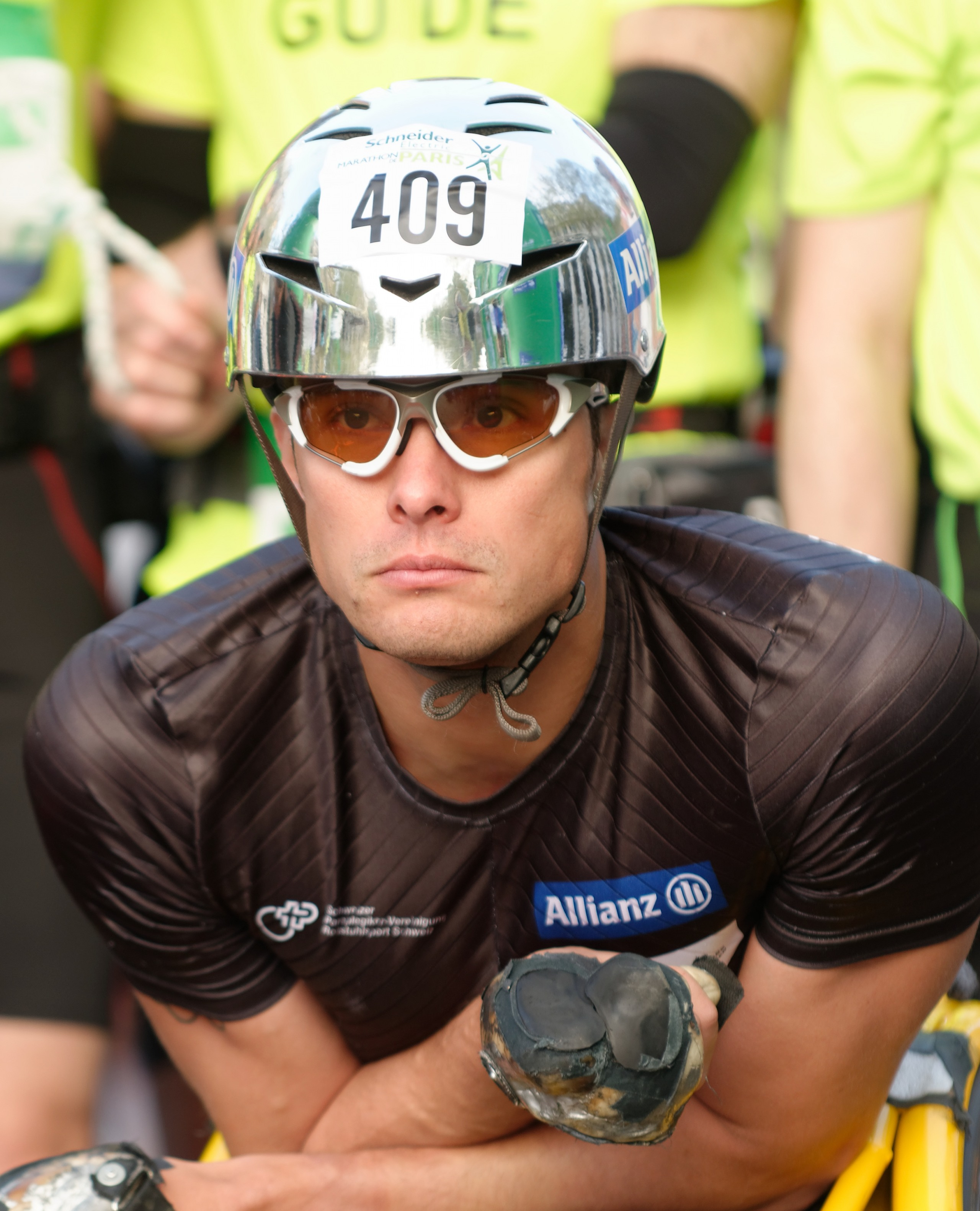
Marcel Hug won the men's wheelchair race.

The temperature at the race start was 8 °C (46 °F), which was ideal for fast running.

The elite men's event was won by Kenyan Eliud Kipchoge in a time of 2:02:40, which was the fourth fastest time in history and a competition record. Shura Kitata fell away from the leading pack after 8 kilometres (5.0 mi), and at the 10 kilometres (6.2 mi), the field took a wrong turn which cost them around 10 seconds. At the halfway point, the leading pack contained five runners: Kipchoge, Amos Kipruto, Tamirat Tola, Mosinet Geremew and Jonathan Korir; Geremew withdrew from the race after 25 kilometres (16 mi). After 29 kilometres (18 mi), only Kipchoge, Kipruto and Tola were in the leading pack, and Kipchoge broke away from fellow countryman Amos Kipruto after 22 miles (35 km) of the race. Kipruto finished second, with Ethiopian Tamirat Tola third. Kengo Suzuki finished fourth, and his time was the second fastest by a Japanese man in history.

The elite women's race was won by Kenyan Brigid Kosgei in a time of 2:16:02, the third fastest ever time as well as being a competition record. At the half way point, the leading pack contained Kosgei, Gotytom Gebreslase, Ashete Bekere, Angela Tanui and Hiwot Gebrekidan. Kosgei and Gebreslase broke away after 35 kilometres (22 mi), and Gebreslase was later distanced. Towards the end of the race, Gebreslase was overtaken by Ashete Bekere, who finished second; Gebreslase crossed the finishing line in third place.

The men's wheelchair race was won by Swiss athlete Marcel Hug, in a course record time of 1:22:16. Tomoki Suzuki and Hiroki Nishida finished in second and third places respectively. Tsubasa Kina won the women's wheelchair event; her time of 1:40:21 was slightly slower than the course record that she set in 2020.

Around 20,000 people competed in the mass participation event. It was the first Tokyo Marathon mass participation event since 2019, as the 2020 race only featured elite athletes.

== Results ==
=== Men ===
Elite men's top 10 finishers
| Position | Athlete | Nationality | Time |
|---|---|---|---|
| 1st place, gold medalist(s) | Eliud Kipchoge | Kenya | 02:02:40 |
| 2nd place, silver medalist(s) | Amos Kipruto | Kenya | 02:03:13 |
| 3rd place, bronze medalist(s) | Tamirat Tola | Ethiopia | 02:04:14 |
| 4 | Kengo Suzuki | Japan | 02:05:28 |
| 5 | Shura Kitata | Ethiopia | 02:06:12 |
| 6 | Laban Korir | Kenya | 02:06:37 |
| 7 | Kenya Sonata | Japan | 02:07:23 |
| 8 | Shun Yuzawa | Japan | 02:07:31 |
| 9 | Kento Kikutani | Japan | 02:07:55 |
| 10 | Michael Githae | Kenya | 02:07:55 |

=== Women ===
Elite women's top 10 finishers
| Position | Athlete | Nationality | Time |
|---|---|---|---|
| 1st place, gold medalist(s) | Brigid Kosgei | Kenya | 02:16:02 |
| 2nd place, silver medalist(s) | Ashete Bekere | Ethiopia | 02:17:58 |
| 3rd place, bronze medalist(s) | Gotytom Gebreslase | Ethiopia | 02:18:18 |
| 4 | Angela Tanui | Kenya | 02:18:42 |
| 5 | Hiwot Gebrekidan | Ethiopia | 02:19:10 |
| 6 | Mao Ichiyama | Japan | 02:21:02 |
| 7 | Hitomi Niiya | Japan | 02:21:17 |
| 8 | Sara Hall | United States | 02:22:56 |
| 9 | Helen Bekele Tola | Ethiopia | 02:24:33 |
| 10 | Kaori Morita | Japan | 02:27:38 |

=== Wheelchair men ===
Wheelchair men's top 3 finishers
| Position | Athlete | Nationality | Time |
|---|---|---|---|
| 1st place, gold medalist(s) | Marcel Hug | Switzerland | 01:22:16 |
| 2nd place, silver medalist(s) | Tomoki Suzuki | Japan | 01:29:12 |
| 3rd place, bronze medalist(s) | Hiroki Nishida | Japan | 01:29:55 |

=== Wheelchair women ===
Wheelchair women's finishers
| Position | Athlete | Nationality | Time |
|---|---|---|---|
| 1st place, gold medalist(s) | Tsubasa Kina | Japan | 01:40:21 |
| 2nd place, silver medalist(s) | Wakako Tsuchida | Japan | 01:44:58 |
