= Collen Mulaudzi =

South African long-distance runner

Personal information
- Born: 8 April 1991 (age 34) Ha-Ramantsha Village, Louis Trichardt, Limpopo, South Africa

Sport
- Country: South Africa
- Sport: Athletics
- Event: Long-distance running

Collen Mulaudzi (born 8 April 1991) is a South African long-distance runner. He competed in the men's race at the 2020 World Athletics Half Marathon Championships held in Gdynia, Poland.

In 2017, he represented South Africa at the Summer Universiade, held in Taipei, Taiwan, in the men's half marathon event. He finished in 19th place.

== Achievements ==
Year	Competition	Venue	Position	Event	Notes
Representing South Africa
2017	Summer Universiade	Taipei, Taiwan	19th	Half marathon	1:11:37
2020	World Championships (HM)	Gdynia, Poland	23rd	Half marathon	1:00:51
