= Timothy Kiplagat =

Kenyan long-distance runner

Personal information
- Born: 18 September 1993 (age 33)

Sport
- Country: Kenya
- Sport: Athletics
- Event: Long-distance running

Achievements and titles
- Personal bests: 10K – 27:52 (Laredo 2018); Marathon – 2:02:55 (Tokyo 2024)
Medal record
World Marathon Majors
Silver medal – second place	2024 Tokyo	Marathon

Timothy Kiplagat Ronoh (born 18 September 1993) is a Kenyan long-distance runner who specializes the marathon.

He finished 14th in the marathon race at the 2023 World Championships. Kiplagat finished second at the 2024 Tokyo Marathon with a personal best time of 2:02:55. This made him the seventh fastest person ever in the event. His 25K split was also the third fastest ever recorded for the distance. He also won the 2022 Abu Dhabi Marathon and the 2023 Saint Silvester Road Race and held the course record for the Melbourne Marathon until broken on 11 October 2026 by 2 seconds by Eliud Kipchoge.

Kiplagat was a training partner and friend of marathon world record holder Kelvin Kiptum.
