= Kengo Suzuki =

Japanese long-distance runner (born 1995)

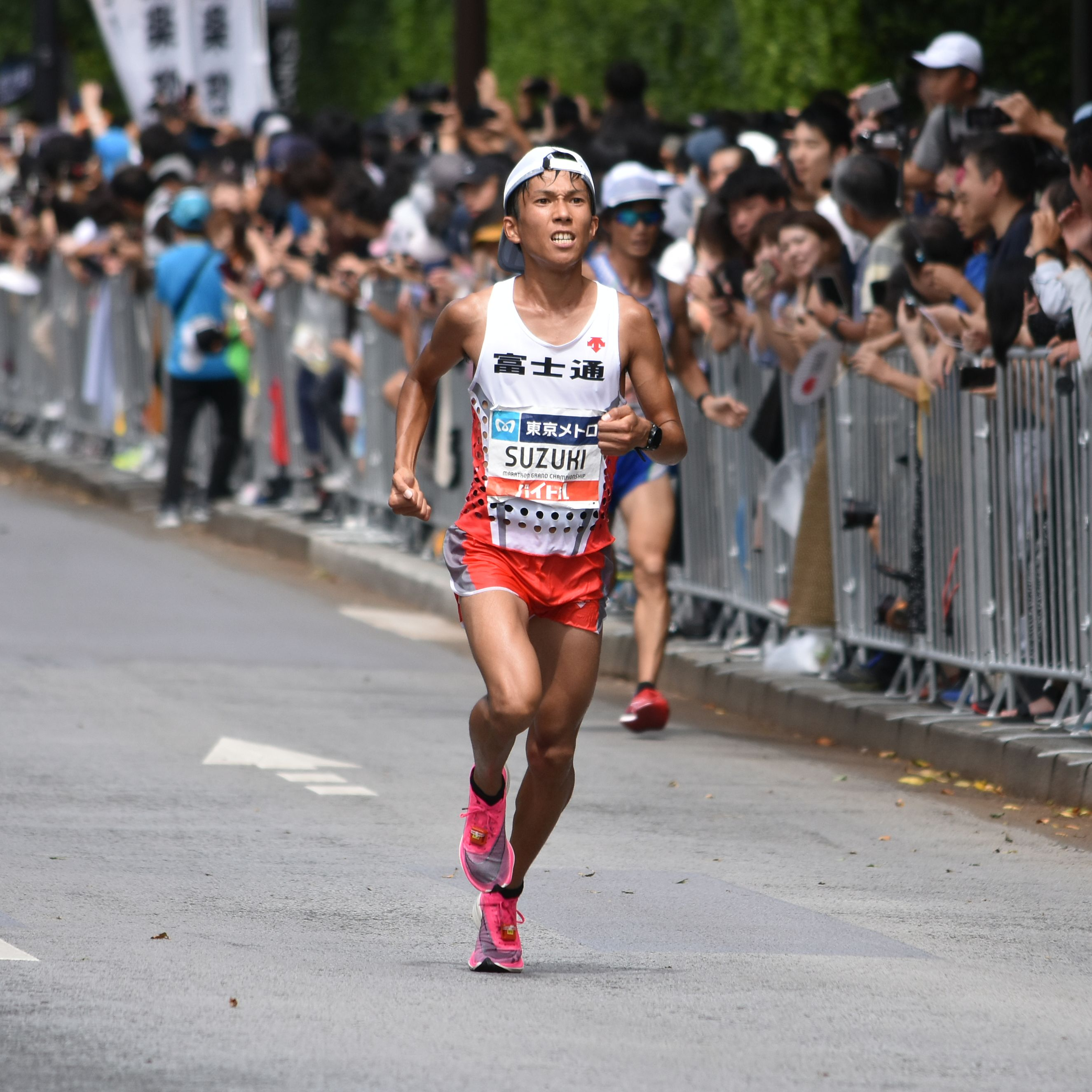

Personal information
- Born: 11 June 1995 (age 31)

Sport
- Country: Japan
- Sport: Athletics
- Event: Long-distance running

Achievements and titles
- Personal bests: 5000 m: 13:57.88; 10,000 m: 27:49.16; Half marathon: 1:01:53; Marathon: 2:04:56 NR

Kengo Suzuki (born 11 June 1995) is a Japanese long-distance runner. He won bronze in the half marathon at the 2017 Summer Universiade in Taipei, where he finished in a time of 1:06:56. He also previously held the Japanese national record in the marathon with a time of 2:04:56, set at the Lake Biwa Marathon on 28 February 2021.

== Competition record ==
=== Road races ===
Event	Distance	Rank	Result	Date	Location	Notes
2017 Summer Universiade	Half marathon	3rd	1:06:56	27 August 2017	Taipei	
Tokyo Marathon	Marathon	19th	2:10:21	25 February 2018	Tokyo	
Hamburg Marathon	Marathon	13th	2:11:36	28 April 2019	Hamburg	
Marathon Grand Championships	Marathon	7th	2:12:44	15 September 2019	Tokyo	
Kagawa Marugame Half Marathon	Half marathon	25th	1:01:53	2 February 2020	Marugame	
Lake Biwa Marathon	Marathon	12th	2:10:37	8 March 2020	Otsu	
Lake Biwa Marathon	Marathon	1st	2:04:56	28 February 2021	Otsu	NR
Chicago Marathon	Marathon	4th	2:08:50	10 October 2021	Chicago	
Tokyo Marathon	Marathon	4th	2:05:28	6 March 2022	Tokyo	

== Personal bests ==
Surface	Event	Time	Date	Location	Notes
Track	5000 metres	13:57.88	2 April 2016	Tokyo, Japan	
Track	10,000 metres	27:49.16	19 September 2020	Kumagaya, Japan	
Road	15 km road	44:18	13 November 2016	Nijmegen, Netherlands	
Road	20 km road	58:43	16 October 2016	Tachikawa, Japan	
Road	Half marathon	1:01:53	2 February 2020	Marugame, Japan	
Road	Marathon	2:04:56	28 February 2021	Otsu, Japan	NR
