= Benson Kipruto =

Kenyan long-distance runner

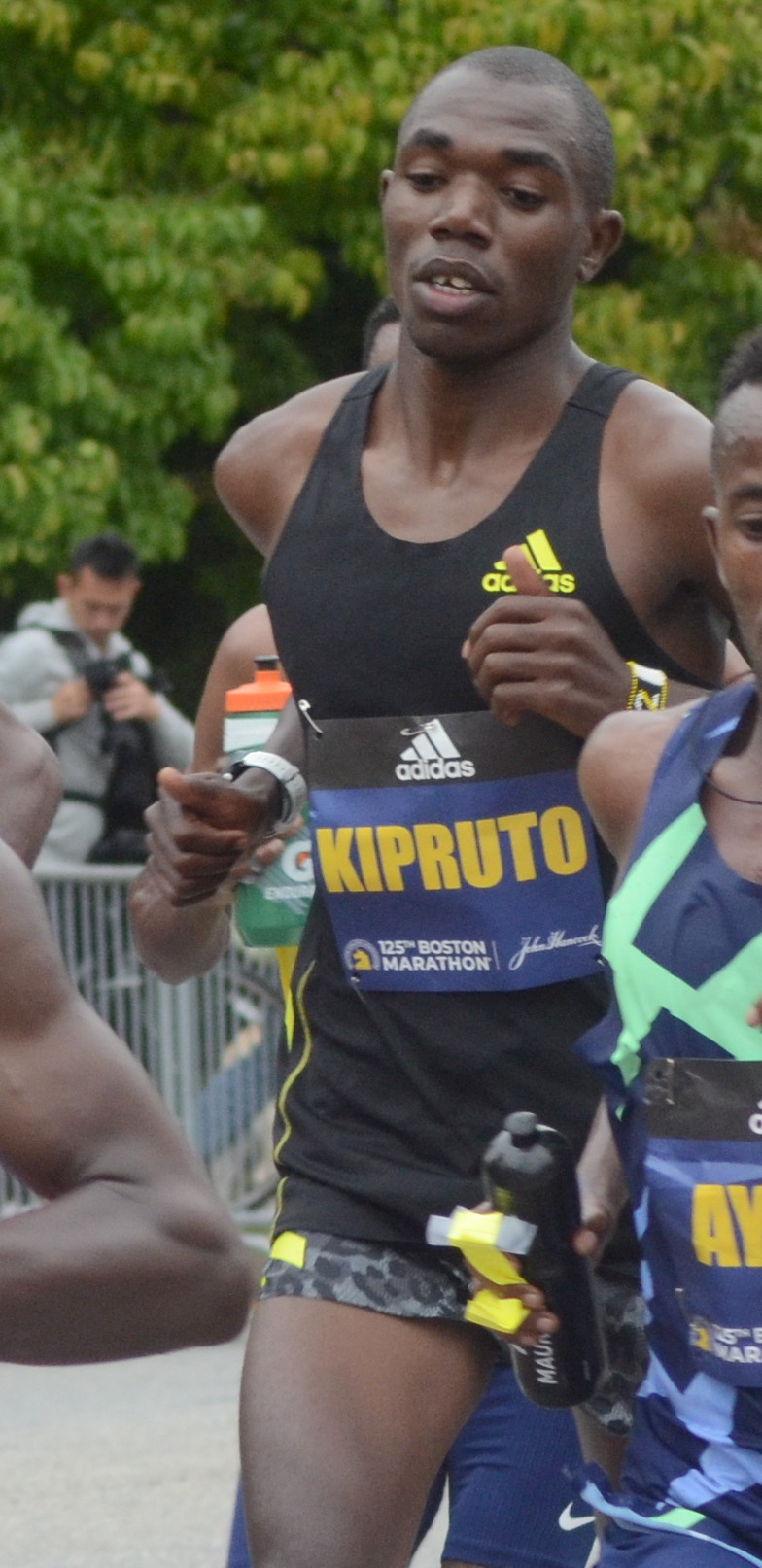
- Kipruto approaching the half way point in the 2021 Boston Marathon which he would go on to win.

Personal information
- Born: 17 March 1991 (age 35) Tolilet, Nandi County, Kenya

Sport
- Country: Kenya
- Sport: Athletics
- Event: Marathon
Medal record
Men's athletics
Representing Kenya
Olympic Games
Bronze medal – third place	2024 Paris	Marathon
World Marathon Majors
Gold medal – first place	2021 Boston	Marathon
Gold medal – first place	2022 Chicago	Marathon
Gold medal – first place	2024 Tokyo	Marathon
Gold medal – first place	2025 New York	Marathon
Silver medal – second place	2023 Chicago	Marathon
Bronze medal – third place	2022 Boston	Marathon
Bronze medal – third place	2023 Boston	Marathon
Bronze medal – third place	2026 Boston	Marathon

Benson Kipruto (born 17 March 1991) is a Kenyan long-distance runner who specializes in the marathon. An Olympic bronze medallist, he has won four World Marathon Majors: the 2021 Boston Marathon, 2022 Chicago Marathon, 2024 Tokyo Marathon, and 2025 New York City Marathon. His victory in Tokyo came in a personal best of 2:02:16, which also established a new course record.

Kipruto finished second at the 2023 Chicago Marathon in a then-personal best of 2:04:02, behind compatriot Kelvin Kiptum, who broke the marathon world record in the race. He also recorded third-place finishes at the 2022 and 2023 Boston Marathons.

== Personal life ==
Kipruto is the younger brother of Kenyan long distance runner Dickson Chumba.

== Career ==
Having run a personal best of 2:07:11 in March 2018 at the Seoul Marathon, Kipruto won the 2018 Toronto Waterfront Marathon in a time of 2:07:24.

In 2021, Kipruto won the Battle of the Teams event in 2021 held in place of the Prague Marathon (2:10:16). In October of the same year, he won the 2021 Boston Marathon in a time of 2:09:51.

He finished third in April's 2022 Boston Marathon as part of an all-Kenyan podium, with a time of 2:07:27. Later in the year Kipruto won a race from the World Marathon Majors for the second time, finishing first in the 2022 Chicago Marathon with a time of 2:04:24.

In 2023, Kipruto finished third at April's 2023 Boston Marathon, finishing the course in 2:06:06. His time of 2:04:02 in the 2023 Chicago Marathon was enough for second place behind Kelvin Kiptum, who won the race in a world record time.

Kipruto won the 2024 Tokyo Marathon in a course record time of 2:02:16, later representing Kenya in the Olympic Games, where he won a bronze medal after finishing third in the marathon in a time of 2:07:00. That year Kipruto was shortlisted for the World Athletics Out of Stadium Male Athlete of the Year award, which was eventually won by Tamirat Tola.

== Personal bests ==
- Half marathon – 1:00:06 (Prague 2020)
- Marathon – 2:02:16 (Tokyo 2024)

== Notable marathon results ==
Results taken from IAAF Profile

Year	Race	Place	Time
2016	Athens Classic Marathon	2nd	2:13:24
2017	Prague Marathon	4th	2:09:51
2017	Gongju Dong-A Marathon	2nd	2:07:21
2018	Seoul Marathon	3rd	2:07:11
2018	Toronto Waterfront Marathon	1st	2:07:24
2019	Boston Marathon	10th	2:09:53
2019	Toronto Waterfront Marathon	4th	2:05:13
2020	London Marathon	7th	2:06:42
2021	Prague Marathon	1st	2:10:16
2021	Boston Marathon	1st	2:09:51
2022	Boston Marathon	3rd	2:07:27
2022	Chicago Marathon	1st	2:04:24
2023	Boston Marathon	3rd	2:06:06
2023	Chicago Marathon	2nd	2:04:02
2024	Tokyo Marathon	1st	2:02:16
2024	Olympic Games	3rd	2:07:00
2025	Tokyo Marathon	7th	2:05:46
2025	New York City Marathon	1st	2:08.09
2026	Boston Marathon	3rd	2:02:50
