= 2019 World Para Athletics Championships – Women's 800 metres =

The women's 800 metres at the 2019 World Para Athletics Championships was held in Dubai on 8, 11, and 14 November 2019.

== Medalists ==
| Event | Gold | | Silver | | Bronze | |
|---|---|---|---|---|---|---|
| T34 | Hannah Cockroft; United Kingdom | 1:57.27 CR | Kare Adenegan; United Kingdom | 2:01.32 PB | Alexa Halko; United States | 2:01.35 AR |
| T53 | Madison de Rozario; Australia | 1:52.15 CR | Catherine Debrunner; Switzerland | 1:53.19 | Zhou Hongzhuan; China | 1:53.46 |
| T54 | Zou Lihong; China | 1:48.26 | Amanda McGrory; United States | 1:48.84 | Susannah Scaroni; United States | 1:49.21 |
WR world record | AR area record | CR championship record | GR games record | NR national record | OR Olympic record | PB personal best | SB season best | WL world leading (in a given season)
