= 2017 World Para Athletics Championships – Men's 4 × 400 metres relay =

The men's 4 x 400 metres relay at the 2017 World Para Athletics Championships was held at the Olympic Stadium in London from 14 to 23 July.

== Medalists ==
Event	Gold		Silver	Bronze
T53/T54	Japan; Sho Watanabe; Tomoki Suzuki; Yuki Nishi; Hitoshi Matsunaga	3:15.93	—	—
WR world record | AR area record | CR championship record | GR games record | NR national record | OR Olympic record | PB personal best | SB season best | WL world leading (in a given season)

Events listed in pink were contested but no medals were awarded.

== See also ==
- List of IPC world records in athletics
