= 2023 World Para Athletics Championships – Women's 5000 metres =

The women's 5000 metres event at the 2023 World Para Athletics Championships was held at Charlety Stadium, Paris, France.

== Medalists ==
Event	Gold		Silver		Bronze	
T54	Catherine Debrunner; Switzerland	11:07.22	Manuela Schär; Switzerland	11:07.49	Susannah Scaroni; United States	11:09.14

== T54 ==
=== Final ===
The final took place on 10 July.

Rank	Lane	Sport Class	Name	Nationality	Time	Notes
1st place, gold medalist(s)	6	T53	Catherine Debrunner	Switzerland	11:07.22	CR
2nd place, silver medalist(s)	1	T54	Manuela Schär	Switzerland	11:07.49	
3rd place, bronze medalist(s)	7	T54	Susannah Scaroni	United States	11:09.14	
	5	T54	Eden Rainbow-Cooper	Great Britain	11:22.01	
	2	T54	Merle Menje	Germany	11:22.07	
	4	T54	Yajuan Tian	China	11:22.13	
	3	T54	Patricia Eachus	Switzerland	11:40.53	
	8	T53	Madison de Rozario	Australia	DNF	
