= Peter Chebet =

Kenyan long-distance runner

Peter Kiprono Chebet (born 24 June 1974) is a Kenyan long-distance runner.

He was second at the 2003 San Diego Marathon and finished fourth at the Chicago Marathon in a personal best time of 2:08:43. A fourth-place finish at the 2005 Paris Marathon was followed by a runner-up performance at the 2006 Vienna Marathon (2:08:56).

== Achievements ==
Year	Competition	Venue	Position	Event	Notes
Representing Kenya
2002	Milan Marathon	Milan, Italy	4th	Marathon	2:09:22
2015	Glass City Marathon	Toledo, USA	1st	Marathon	2:21:05

=== Personal bests ===
- Marathon - 2:08.43 hrs (2003)
