= 2024 Tokyo Marathon =

42.195 km (26.2 mi) race in Japan

17th Tokyo Marathon
- Location: Tokyo, Japan
- Dates: 3 March 2024

Champions
- Men: Benson Kipruto (2:02:16)
- Women: Sutume Kebede (2:15:55)
- Wheelchair men: Tomoki Suzuki (1:23:04)
- Wheelchair women: Manuela Schär (1:40:08)

The 2024 Tokyo Marathon was the 17th edition of the annual marathon race in Tokyo, held on Sunday, 3 March 2024. A Platinum Label marathon, it was the first of six annual World Marathon Majors events to be held in 2024. With over 37,000 competitors, new course records were set in both the men's and women's races.

== Results ==
=== Men ===
Elite men's top 10 finishers
Position	Athlete	Nationality	Time
1st place, gold medalist(s)	Benson Kipruto	Kenya	2:02:16
2nd place, silver medalist(s)	Timothy Kiplagat	Kenya	2:02:55
3rd place, bronze medalist(s)	Vincent Kipkemoi	Kenya	2:04:18
4	Hailemaryam Kiros	Ethiopia	2:05:43
5	Tsegaye Getachew	Ethiopia	2:06:25
6	Bethwel Kibet	Kenya	2:06:26
7	Haimro Alame	Israel	2:06:27
8	Simon Kariuki	Kenya	2:06:29
9	Yusuke Nishiyama	Japan	2:06:31
10	Eliud Kipchoge	Kenya	2:06:50

=== Women ===
Elite women's top 10 finishers
Position	Athlete	Nationality	Time
1st place, gold medalist(s)	Sutume Asefa Kebede	Ethiopia	2:15:55
2nd place, silver medalist(s)	Rosemary Wanjiru	Kenya	2:16:14
3rd place, bronze medalist(s)	Amane Beriso	Ethiopia	2:16:58
4	Sifan Hassan	Netherlands	2:18:05
5	Betsy Saina	United States	2:19:17
6	Hitomi Niiya	Japan	2:21:50
7	Meseret Abebayahau	Ethiopia	2:23:08
8	Khishigsaikhan Galbadrakh	Mongolia	2:26:32
9	Tigist Abayechew	Ethiopia	2:28:53
10	Ayumi Morita	Japan	2:31:38
