= Jesús Arturo Esparza =

Mexican long-distance runner

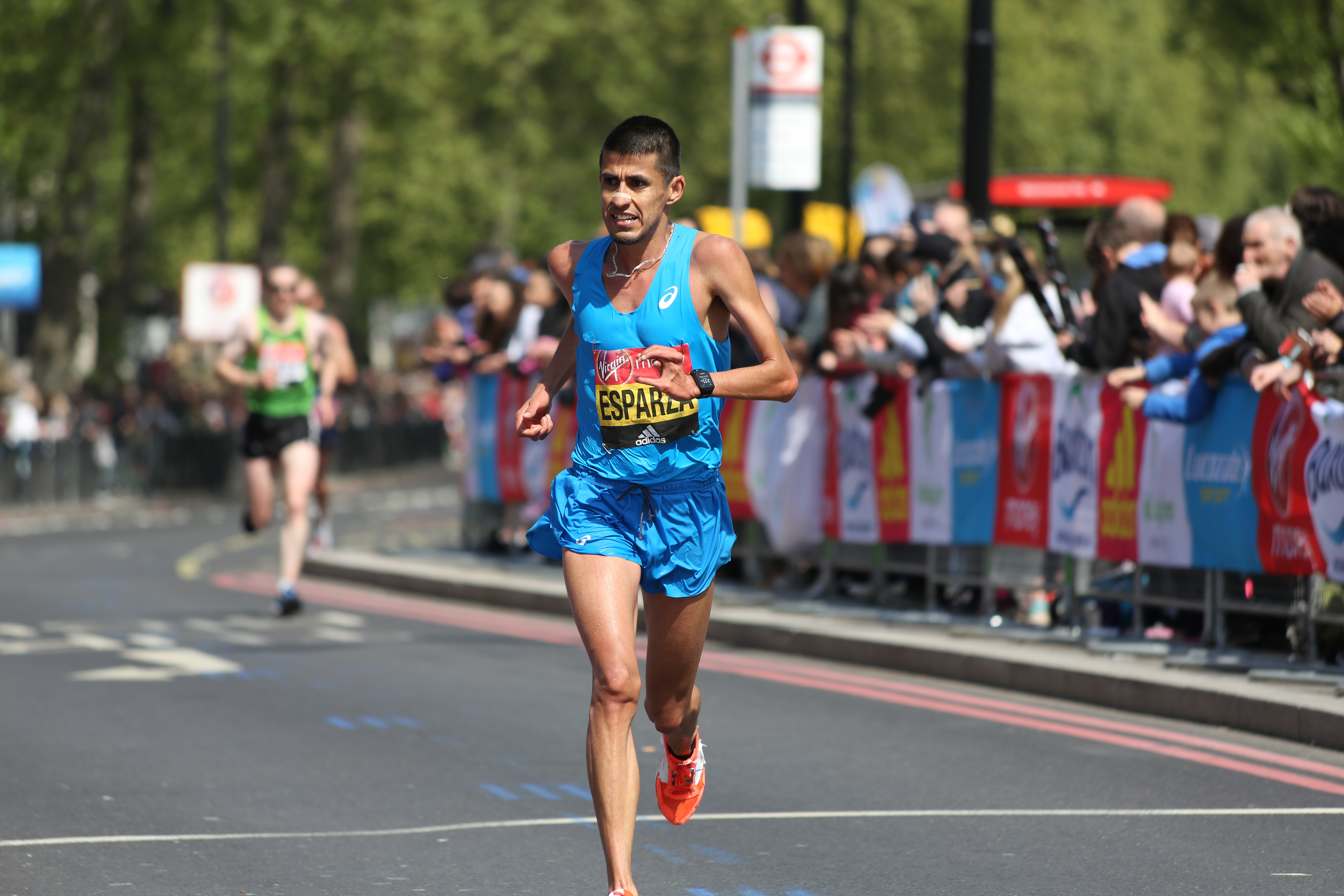
- Jesús Arturo Esparza in 2017

Personal information
- Born: 26 August 1990 (age 35)

Sport
- Country: Mexico
- Sport: Athletics
- Event: Long-distance running

Jesús Arturo Esparza (born 26 August 1990) is a Mexican long-distance runner. In 2020, he competed in the men's race at the 2020 World Athletics Half Marathon Championships held in Gdynia, Poland.

In 2017, he represented Mexico at the 2017 Summer Universiade, held in Taipei, Taiwan, in the men's half marathon event. He finished in 23rd place.

He competed in the men's marathon at the 2020 Summer Olympics in Tokyo, Japan.
