= Sho Watanabe =

Japanese wheelchair racer

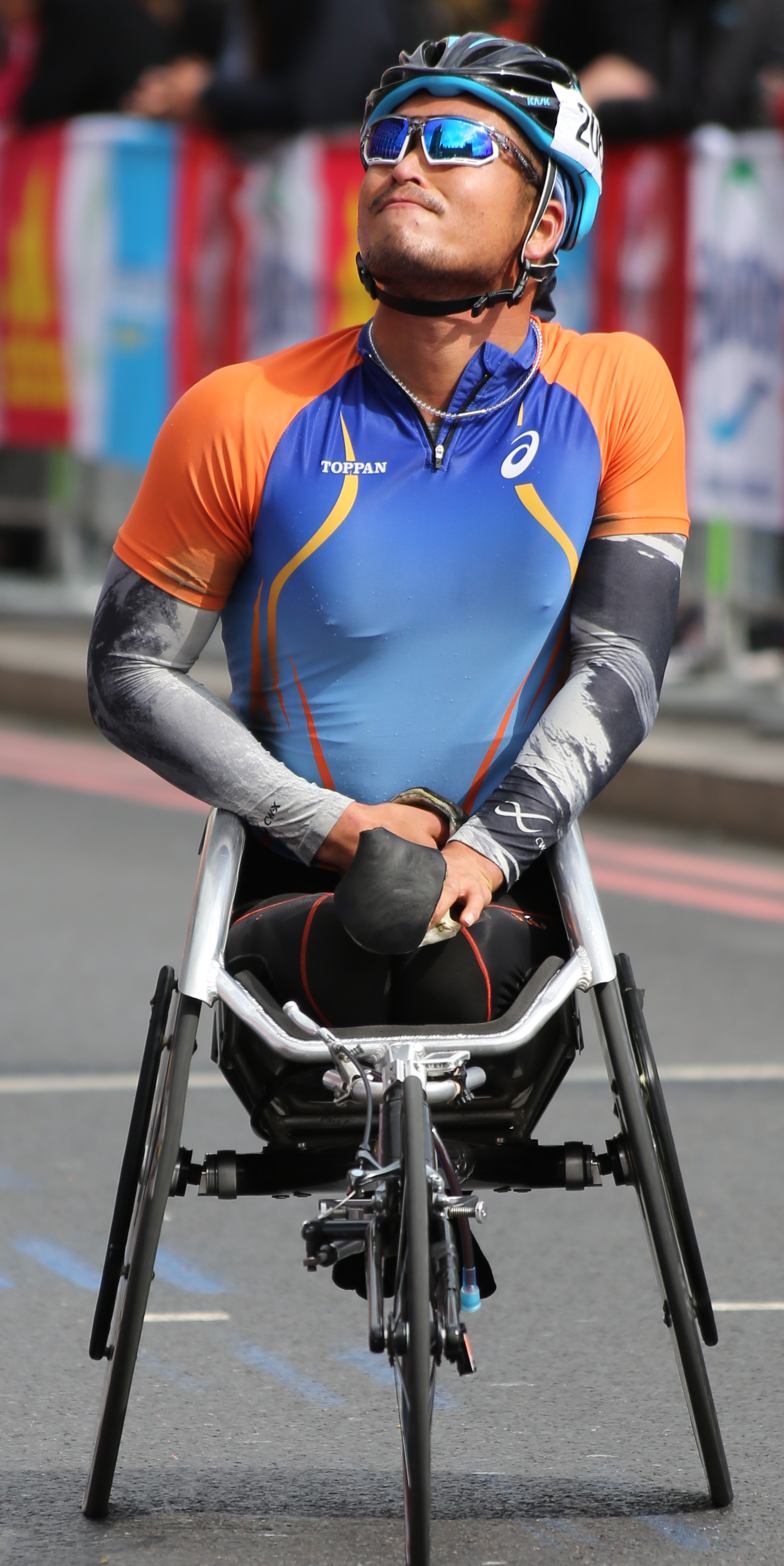
- Watanabe at the 2017 London Marathon

Personal information
- Native name: 渡辺翔
- Born: Fukuoka, Japan

Sport
- Sport: Athletics
- Event: Marathon
Medal record
Marathon
World Marathon Majors
Representing Japan
Gold medal – first place	2017 Tokyo	Marathon
Bronze medal – third place	2017 New York	Marathon
Silver medal – second place	2020 Tokyo	Marathon
Bronze medal – third place	2023 Tokyo	Marathon
Bronze medal – third place	2024 Tokyo	Marathon

Sho Watanabe (Japanese: 渡辺翔) is a Japanese wheelchair racer, who won the 2017 Tokyo Marathon, came second at the 2020 Tokyo Marathon, and came third at the 2017 New York City Marathon and the 2023 and 2024 Tokyo Marathons.

== Personal life ==
Watanabe is from Fukuoka, Japan.

== Career ==
Watanabe came second in the 10,000 metres T54 race at the 2013 IPC Athletics World Championships. Watanabe won the 2017 Tokyo Marathon, beating race favourite Marcel Hug. In the same year, Watanabe finished third at the 2017 New York City Marathon. At the 2017 World Para Athletics Championships in London, Watanabe, Tomoki Suzuki, Yuki Nishi, and Hitoshi Matsunaga won the 4 × 400 metres relay T53/T54 race, by virtue of being the only finishers.

He finished second at the 2019 Singapore Marathon behind countryman Kota Hokonuie. Watanabe came second at the 2020 Tokyo Marathon behind fellow Japanese competitor Tomoki Suzuki. At the 2020 London Marathon, Watanabe was involved in a six-person sprint finish for the victory, and finished fourth. Watanabe finished in 1:36:08, exactly the same time as Marcel Hug who finished third. The next year, he finished seventh at the London Marathon, and ninth at the Boston and New York City Marathons.

Watanabe finished third at the 2023 Tokyo Marathon, and again at the 2024 Tokyo Marathon.
