= Glass City Marathon =

Road running event in Toledo, Ohio

- Location: Toledo, Ohio
- Event type: Road
- Distance: Marathon
- Established: 1971
- Course records: Men: 2:05:54 (2026); Vincent Mauri; Women: 2:35:37 (2025); Alyssa McElheny
- Website: www.glasscitymarathon.org

The Glass City Marathon is a marathon located in Toledo, Ohio. The race is typically held in April.

The race was established in 1971, starting and ending at the University of Toledo.

This race is a USATF certified course and an official qualifier for the Boston Marathon.

The race typically draws more than 1,000 competitors for the marathon race alone. Other events include the half-marathon and 5K.

== List of winners of the Glass City Marathon ==
=== Men's ===
Year	Winner	Country	Time	Notes
1990	Gary Bryan	United States	2:29:31	
1991	Glenn Miller	United States	2:36:27	
1992	Tom Wilhelm	United States	2:32:02	
1993	Bill Valenzano	United States	2:34:11	
1994	Tom Fries	United States	2:28:17	
1995	Gary Purse	United States	2:33:36	
1996	Jim Yeomans	United States	2:39:03	
1997	Jeffrey Martin	United States	2:32:14	
1998	Andrew Jones	United States	2:33:25	
1999	Barry Lewis	United States	2:40:35	
2000	Patrick Benedict	United States	2:38:14	
2013	Evan Gaynor	United States	2:21:19	
2014	Geoffrey Kiprotich	Kenya	2:24:02	
2015	Peter Chebet	Kenya	2:21:05	
2016	Robert Gititu	United States	2:27:24	
2017	Evan Gaynor	United States	2:23:56	Second victory
2018	Aaron Cooper	Canada	2:20:58	
2019	Elijah Rugut	United States	2:21:56	
2020	Held virtually due to COVID-19			
2021	Ryan Corby	United States	2:21:46	
2022	Tom Slattery	United States	2:21:38	
2023	Jason Salyer	United States	2:20:27	
2024	Derek Stone	United States	2:28:30	
2025	Adam Beucler	United States	2:19:31	
2026	Vincent Mauri	United States	2:05:54	Course Record

=== Women's ===
Year	Winner	Country	Time	Notes
1990	Sarah Davis	United States	2:54:50	
1991	Susan Hickey	United States	3:06:21	
1992	Penny Grandstaff	United States	3:05:27	
1993	Marybeth Dillon	United States	2:59:22	
1994	Jill Ortman	United States	3:04:15	
1995	Cindy Shipman	United States	2:57:33	
1996	Serena Fraser	United States	3:10:47	
1997	Rebecca Hayward	United States	3:13:16	
1998	Karen McCracken	United States	3:10:52	
1999	Karen McCracken	United States	3:09:53	Second victory
2000	Laura Bell	United States	2:57:44	
2013	Laura Gillette	United States	3:04:00	
2014	Katie Kay	United States	2:56:26	
2015	Samantha Bluske	United States	2:47:19	
2016	Laura Berry	United States	2:58:07	
2017	Emma McCarron	United States	2:50:12	
2018	Maura Lemon	United States	2:45:37	
2019	Amy Manning	United States	2:52:52	
2020	Held virtually due to COVID-19			
2021	Grace McCarron	United States	2:46:24	
2022	Sydney Devore	United States	2:41:25	
2023	Rachel Hannah	Canada	2:40:12	
2024	Kathleen Lawrence	Canada	2:53:57	
2025	Alyssa McElheny	United States	2:35:37	Course Record
2026	Andie Cozzarelli	United States	2:36:57	

== See also ==
- List of marathon races in North America
