= Momoko Tanaka =

Japanese footballer

Momoko Tanaka 田中 桃子
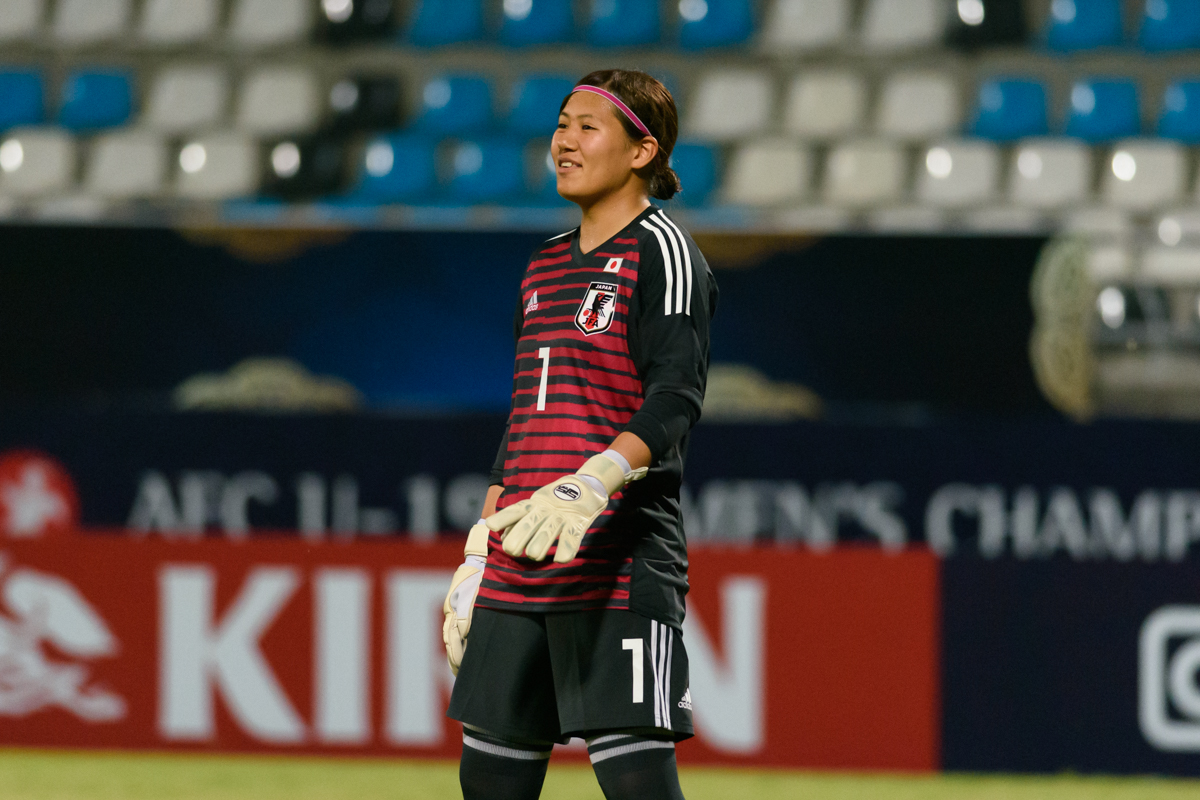

Personal information
- Date of birth: 17 March 2000 (age 26)
- Place of birth: Nagano Prefecture, Japan
- Height: 1.68 m (5 ft 6 in)
- Position: Goalkeeper

Team information
- Current team: JEF United Chiba
- Number: 1

Senior career*
Years	Team	Apps	(Gls)
2016–	Tokyo Verdy Beleza		
2019–2020	→ Yamato Sylphid (loan)		
2025–	→ JEF United Chiba (loan)		

International career^{‡}
2016	Japan U-17	5	(0)
2019	Japan U-19	6	(0)
2021–	Japan	5	(0)
- * Club domestic league appearances and goals ‡ National team caps and goals as of March 27, 2023

Momoko Tanaka (田中 桃子, Tanaka Momoko; born 17 March 2000) is a Japanese professional footballer who plays as a goalkeeper for WE League club Tokyo Verdy Beleza.

== Club career ==
Tanaka made her WE League debut on 12 September 2021.

== International career ==
On 13 June 2023, she was included in Japan's 23-player squad for the 2023 FIFA Women's World Cup.

== Career statistics ==
=== International ===
National Team	Year	Apps	Goals
Japan
Japan	2021	1	0
Japan	2022	3	0
Japan	2023	1	0
Total		5	0
