= Tomoki Suzuki =

Japanese wheelchair racer (born 1994)

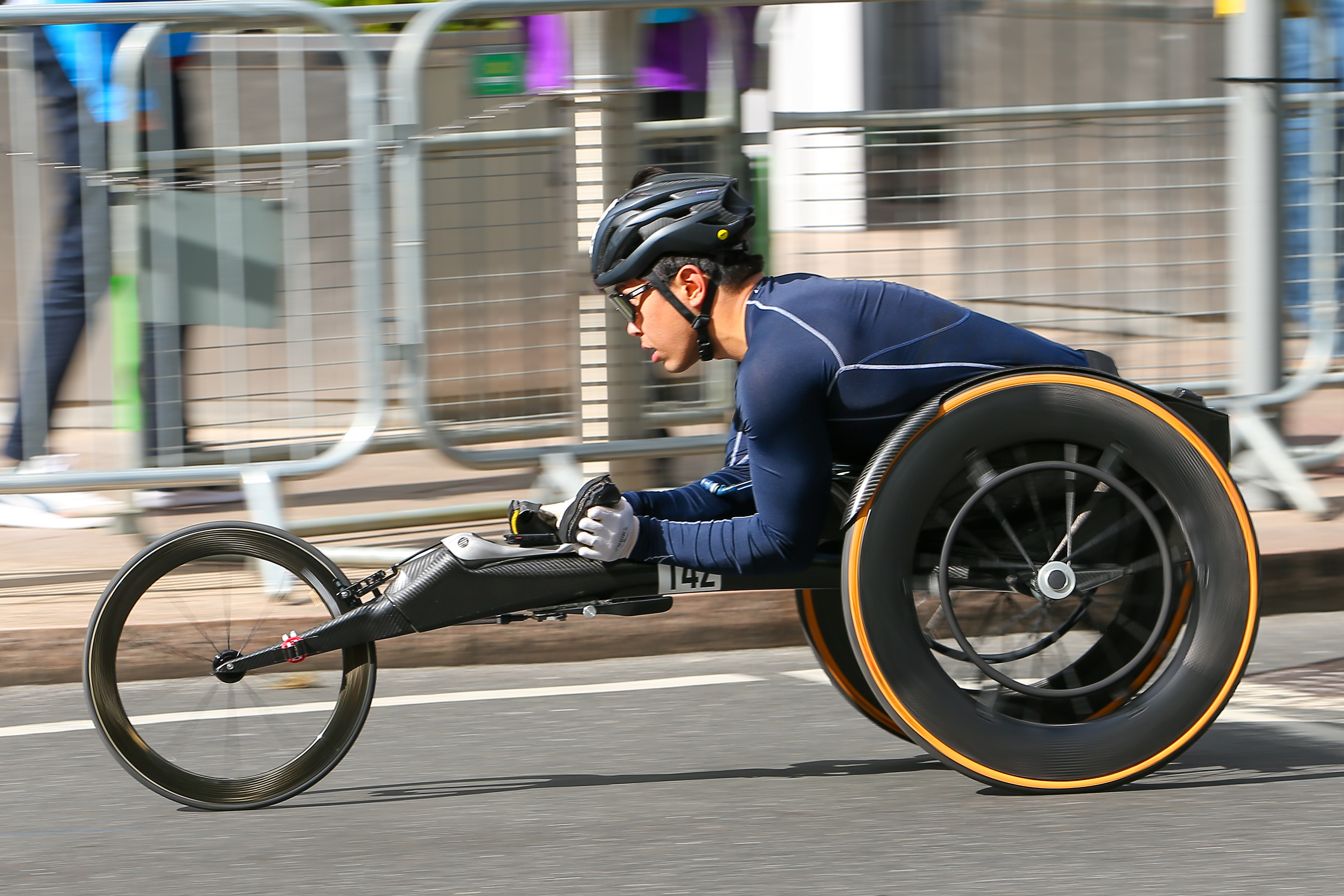
- Tomoki Suzuki (2024 London Marathon)

Personal information
- Native name: 鈴木 朋樹
- Born: 14 June 1994 (age 32) Tateyama, Chiba, Japan
- Education: Josai International University
- Height: 1.67 m (5 ft 6 in)
- Weight: 61 kg (134 lb)

Sport
- Sport: Athletics
- Event: Marathon

Achievements and titles
- Paralympic finals: 2020
- World finals: 2015, 2017
Medal record
Men's para-athletics
Representing Japan
Paralympic Games
Bronze medal – third place	2020 Tokyo	4 × 100 metres
Bronze medal – third place	2024 Paris	Marathon T54
World Para Athletics Championships
Gold medal – first place	2017 London	4 × 400 metres
World Marathon Majors
Silver medal – second place	2015 Tokyo	Marathon
Bronze medal – third place	2017 Tokyo	Marathon
Silver medal – second place	2018 Tokyo	Marathon
Bronze medal – third place	2019 London	Marathon
Gold medal – first place	2020 Tokyo	Marathon
Silver medal – second place	2021 Tokyo	Marathon
Silver medal – second place	2023 Tokyo	Marathon
Bronze medal – third place	2023 London	Marathon
Gold medal – first place	2024 Tokyo	Marathon
Gold medal – first place	2025 Tokyo	Marathon
Bronze medal – third place	2025 New York	Marathon

Tomoki Suzuki (Japanese: 鈴木 朋樹, born 14 June 1994) is a Japanese wheelchair racer, who won the 2020, 2024 and 2025 Tokyo Marathons, came second at the 2015, 2018, 2021 and 2023 Tokyo Marathons, and came third at the 2017 Tokyo, 2019 and 2023 London Marathons. Suzuki and won a bronze medal in the mixed 4 × 100 metres relay at the 2020 Summer Paralympics, and a bronze medal in the marathon T54 event at the 2024 Summer Paralympics. He is currently running the 2025 London Marathon.

== Personal life ==
Suzuki was born on 14 June 1994 in Tateyama, Chiba, Japan. At the age of eight months, Suzuki was involved in a car accident that left him with paraplegia. He now lives in Tokyo.

== Career ==
Suzuki competed at the 2009 Asian Youth Para Games, whilst at middle school. Whilst in secondary school, he was coached by Paralympian Nobukazu Hanaoka. He is now a member of Toyota athletics club.

Suzuki came second at the 2015 Tokyo Marathon. Suzuki's first senior world championships was the 2015 IPC Athletics World Championships in Doha, Qatar. He did not qualify for the 2016 Summer Paralympics in Rio de Janeiro. He finished second at the 2016 Oita International Wheelchair Marathon. He came third at the 2017 Tokyo Marathon. At the 2017 World Para Athletics Championships in London, Suzuki, Sho Watanabe, Yuki Nishi, and Hitoshi Matsunaga won the 4 × 400 metres relay T53/T54 race, by virtue of being the only finishers. He also came fifth in the 800 metres T54 event at the Championships.

Suzuki came second at the 2018 Tokyo Marathon; he finished one second behind race winner Hiroyuki Yamamoto, in a time of 1:26:24. In the same year, he finished second in the Oita International Wheelchair Marathon, one second behind winner Marcel Hug, and on the same time as third placed Yoo Byung-hoon. He also finished sixth at the New York City Marathon in a time of 1:40:28. Suzuki came third at the 2019 London Marathon, after breaking away from the main group alongside Daniel Romanchuk and Marcel Hug halfway through the race. In doing so, he qualified for the 2020 Summer Paralympics in Tokyo.

Suzuki won the 2020 Tokyo Marathon, after forming an early group with Hiroki Nishida and Sho Watanabe, and then taking the lead 8 kilometres (5.0 mi) into the race. His finishing time of 1:21:52 was a course record, and he won the race by eight minutes and eight seconds. After the race, Suzuki said he was disappointed that more top athletes, including Marcel Hug, were unable to race due to the COVID-19 pandemic. In December 2020, Suzuki was third in the Runner's World magazine World Para Male Athlete of the Year award, behind 2020 London Marathon winner Brent Lakatos, and David Weir, who came second at the 2020 London Marathon, and won the 400 metres event at the 2020 British Championships. Suzuki also won the Australia Day Oz Day 10K Wheelchair Road Race in 2018, 2019, and 2020.

At the 2020 Summer Paralympics, Suzuki came ninth in the final of the 1500 metres T54 event. He finished fourth in his heat of the 800 metres T54 event, and did not qualify for the final. He was part of the Japanese team that came second in their mixed 4 × 100 metres relay heat, and came third in the final. He came seventh in the marathon T54 race. Suzuki came second at the delayed 2021 Tokyo Marathon, and the 2023 Tokyo Marathon. He came third at the 2023 London Marathon.

Suzuki won the 2024 Tokyo Marathon by over five minutes. At the 2024 Summer Paralympics, he finished third in the marathon T54 event, a few seconds behind second place Jin Hua.
