= Meseret Abebayahau =

Ethiopian long-distance runner

Personal information
- Nationality: Ethiopian
- Born: Meseret Abebayehu Alemu; June 28, 1998 (age 28) Ethiopia
- Occupation: Long-distance runner
- Years active: 2022–present

Sport
- Country: Ethiopia
- Sport: Athletics
- Event(s): Marathon, Half marathon

Achievements and titles
- Personal bests: Marathon: 2:19:50 (Amsterdam, 2023); Half Marathon: 1:09:59 (Ghent, 2024)

Meseret Abebayehu Alemu (born 28 June 1998) is an Ethiopian long-distance runner who specializes in the marathon. She is a winner of multiple international marathons and has achieved a personal best time under 2:20.

== Career ==
Abebayehu won the 2022 Yellow River Estuary Marathon in China with a time of 2:27:53. Later that year, she made a significant improvement at the Rock 'n' Roll Madrid Marathon, finishing second in 2:25:18, more than five minutes faster than her previous best.

In 2023, she claimed another major title at the Xiamen Marathon, crossing the line first in 2:24:42. Later that year, she achieved a career milestone at the Amsterdam Marathon. Competing in a world-class field, she secured a second-place finish and shattered the 2:20 barrier for the first time, setting a new personal best of 2:19:50.

In 2024, Abebayehu improved her half marathon personal best to 1:09:59. She also finished seventh at the Tokyo Marathon, a World Marathon Major.

== Personal bests ==
- Marathon: 2:19:50 – Amsterdam, Netherlands, 2023
- Half Marathon: 1:09:59 – Ghent, Belgium, 2024
- 10,000 metres: 32:22.3h – Assela, Ethiopia, 2022

== Major results ==
Year	Competition	Location	Position	Time
2022	Yellow River Estuary Marathon	Dongying, China	1st	2:27:53
2022	Rock 'n' Roll Madrid Marathon	Madrid, Spain	2nd	2:25:18
2023	Xiamen Marathon	Xiamen, China	1st	2:24:42
2023	Amsterdam Marathon	Amsterdam, Netherlands	2nd	2:19:50
2024	Tokyo Marathon	Tokyo, Japan	7th	2:23:08
