= 2020 Tokyo Marathon =

Marathon race in Tokyo, Japan

14th Tokyo Marathon
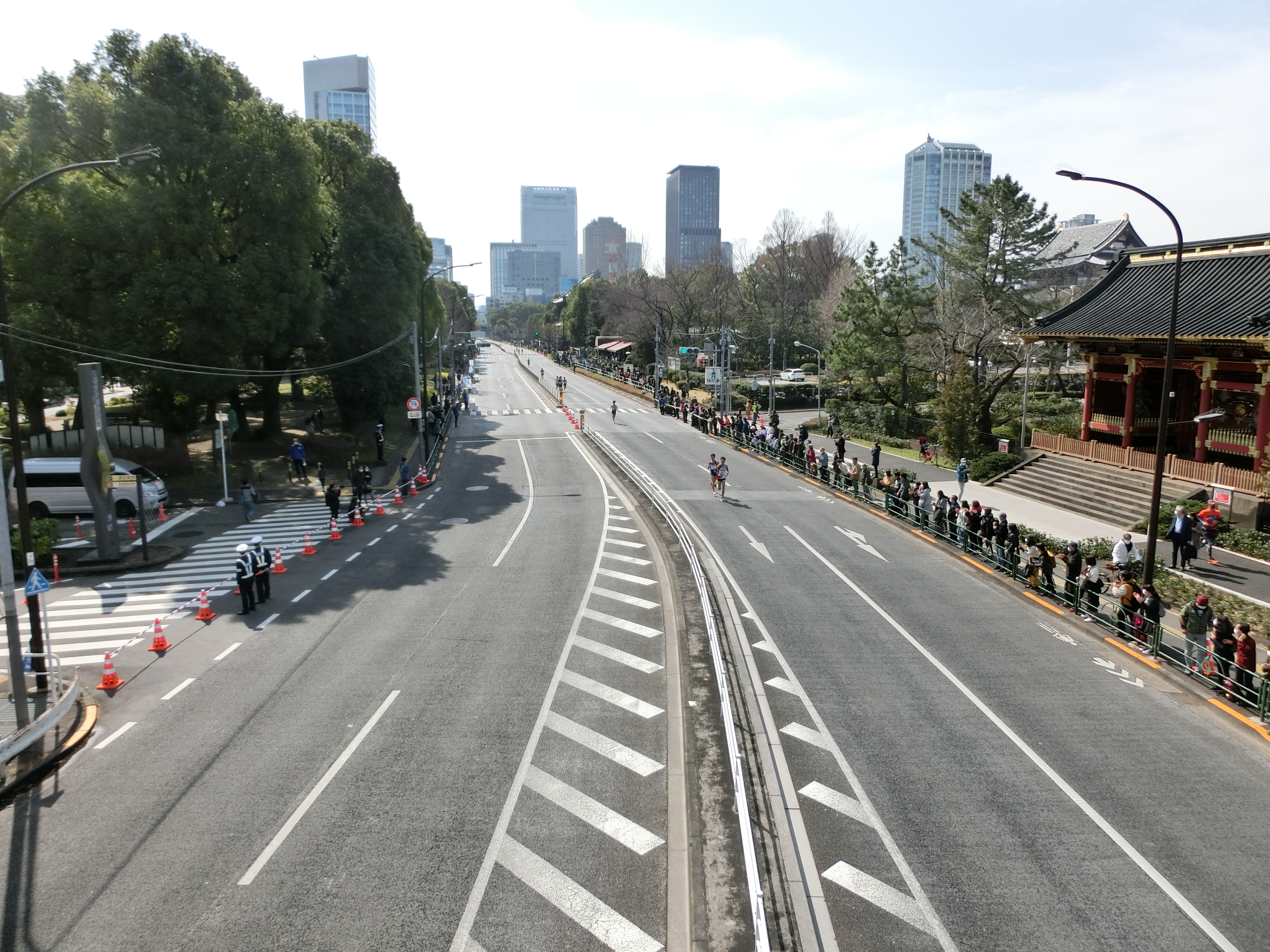
- The Tokyo Marathon in 2020
- Location: Tokyo, Japan
- Dates: 1 March 2020
- Competitors: Elite athletes only

Champions
- Men: Birhanu Legese (2:04:15)
- Women: Lonah Chemtai Salpeter (2:17:45)
- Wheelchair men: Tomoki Suzuki (01:21:52)
- Wheelchair women: Tsubasa Kina (01:40:00)

The 2020 Tokyo Marathon (Japanese: 東京マラソン2020) was the 14th edition of the annual marathon race in Tokyo, and was held on Sunday, 1 March. A World Athletics Platinum Label Road Race, it was the first World Marathon Majors event held that year. The prior year's men's winner, Ethiopian Birhanu Legese, successfully defended his title by winning with a time of 2:04:15. In the women's marathon Israeli Lonah Chemtai Salpeter set a new course record, breaking the old one by over two minutes, as well as a new Israeli national record by winning with a time of 2:17:45; at the time the sixth-fastest women's marathon in the world of all time.

The men's wheelchair race was won by Japanese racer Tomoki Suzuki, and the women's wheelchair race was won by Japanese racer Tsubasa Kina, both setting course records in their victory. Women's winner Tsubasa Kina also went on to win the following year's 2021 Tokyo Marathon.
