= World Marathon Majors =

Championship-style competition

- Sport: Marathon running
- Founded: 2006
- No. of teams: Individual sport
- Website: www.worldmarathonmajors.com

The World Marathon Majors (WMM) is a championship-style competition for marathon runners that started in 2006. A points-based competition founded on eight major marathon races recognised as the most high-profile on the calendar, the series comprises annual races (in order of their founding) for the cities of Boston (1897), New York (1970), Berlin (1974), Chicago (1977), London (1981), Cape Town (1994), Sydney (2000), and Tokyo (2007).

In addition, the World Marathon Majors includes the results of any major global championship marathon held in that year. These races are the biennial World Athletics Championships Marathon, and the quadrennial Olympic Games Marathon.

== History ==
Each World Marathon Majors series originally spanned two full calendar years; the second year of a series overlapped with the first year of the next. Starting in 2015, each series began with a defined city race and ended with the following race in the same city. So, series IX started in February 2015 at the 2015 Tokyo Marathon and ended there in February 2016 at the 2016 Tokyo Marathon. Series X started at the 2016 Boston Marathon and finished at the 2017 Boston Marathon. Series XI started at the 2017 London Marathon and finished at the 2018 London Marathon.

Initial major sponsor Abbott Laboratories added its name in 2015. On April 26, 2017, Dalian Wanda Group Co., Ltd., one of the leading Chinese private conglomerates, announced a ten-year strategic partnership aimed at the continued growth and development of marathon events worldwide.

Beginning with Series X at the 2016 Boston Marathon, wheelchair competitions were added for men and women.

At the end of each of the first 10 WMM series the leading man and woman each won $500,000, making a total prize of one million U.S. dollars. Beginning with Series XI, the prize structure was revised so that for men and women first place became $250,000, second place $50,000 and third place $25,000. In the wheelchair division the prize money for men and women is $50,000 (first), $25,000 (second) and $10,000 (third).

=== Races ===
The World Marathon Majors began in 2006 with five races: Berlin, Boston, Chicago, London, and New York. The Tokyo Marathon, which had been created in 2007 as the successor to two previous marathons, was added as the sixth WMM in 2013. Tokyo was the first race in the series from outside North America or Europe, and its late February/early March date made it the first race of the calendar year for the series.

In November 2024, it was announced that the Sydney Marathon would be added as the seventh race in the World Marathon Majors. The inaugural Sydney event in the series was on August 31, 2025. The Cape Town Marathon passed the first stage of candidacy approval for WMM inclusion in 2024,; it was confirmed as the eighth race in the series in June 2026. Its first race as part of WMM will be on May 23, 2027, placing it fourth in the calendar year between London and Sydney.

In 2024, the Shanghai Marathon was announced as a WMM candidate and began a three year evaluation process.

== Scoring system ==
Athletes who competed in the marathons originally received points for finishing in any of the top five places (1st place: 25 points; 2nd place: 15 points; 3rd place: 10 points; 4th place: 5 points; 5th place: 1 point). Their four highest ranks over the two-year period were counted; if an athlete scored points in more than this number, the athlete's four best races were scored. To be eligible for the jackpot, an athlete had to compete in at least one qualifying race in each calendar year of the series.

In 2015, the scoring was revised (1st place: 25 points; 2nd place: 16 points; 3rd place: 9 points; 4th place: 4 points; 5th place: 1 point). The two highest ranks during the scoring period would be counted, with only the best two if more than that number.

For the first three series if there were equal top scores at the end of the competition the tiebreakers were head-to-head competition and, if necessary, a majority vote of the five WMM race directors. This happened in the 2007–08 women's competition.

Beginning in the 2009–10 season, following best head-to-head record, the following tie-breakers were implemented, in descending order: the person who scored points in the fewest races, the person who won the most qualifying races during the period, the person with the fastest average time in their scoring races, and a majority vote of the six-race directors. If the final circumstance is necessary, the race directors could award the title jointly.

== Major marathons by year ==
The following marathons have been part of the series in each year:

Year	(Japan) Tokyo	(United States) Boston	(United Kingdom) London	(Australia) Sydney	(Germany) Berlin	(United States) Chicago	(United States) New York	World Athletics Championships	Olympic Games
2006	Not held	17 April	23 April	Not part of WMM	24 September	22 October	5 November	Not held	Not held
2007	Not part of WMM	16 April	22 April	Not part of WMM	30 September	7 October	4 November	25 Aug / 2 Sep (Osaka)	Not held
2008	Not part of WMM	21 April	13 April	Not part of WMM	28 September	12 October	2 November	Not held	24 Aug / 17 Aug (Beijing)
2009	Not part of WMM	20 April	26 April	Not part of WMM	20 September	11 October	1 November	22 Aug / 23 Aug (Berlin)	Not held
2010	Not part of WMM	19 April	25 April	Not part of WMM	26 September	10 October	7 November	Not held	Not held
2011	Not part of WMM	18 April	17 April	Not part of WMM	25 September	9 October	6 November	4 Sep / 27 Aug (Daegu)	Not held
2012	Not part of WMM	16 April	22 April	Not part of WMM	30 September	7 October	Cancelled (Note: The 2012 New York Marathon was originally scheduled for 4 November, but cancelled due to Hurricane Sandy.)	Not held	12 Aug / 5 Aug (London)
2013	24 February	15 April	21 April	Not part of WMM	29 September	13 October	3 November	17 Aug / 10 Aug (Moscow)	Not held
2014	23 February	21 April	13 April	Not part of WMM	28 September	12 October	2 November	Not held	Not held
2015	22 February	20 April	26 April	Not part of WMM	27 September	11 October	1 November	22 Aug / 30 Aug (Beijing)	Not held
2016	28 February	18 April	24 April	Not part of WMM	25 September	9 October	6 November	Not held	21 Aug / 14 Aug (Rio de Janeiro)
2017	26 February	17 April	23 April	Not part of WMM	24 September	8 October	5 November	6 Aug / 6 Aug (London)	Not held
2018	25 February	16 April	22 April	Not part of WMM	16 September	7 October	4 November	Not held	Not held
2019	3 March	15 April	28 April	Not part of WMM	29 September	13 October	3 November	6 Oct / 28 Sep (Doha)	Not held
2020	1 March	Cancelled (Note: The 2020 Boston Marathon was originally scheduled for 20 April, then postponed to 14 September and later cancelled due to the COVID-19 pandemic.)	4 October (Note: Postponed from 26 April due to the COVID-19 pandemic.)	Not part of WMM	Cancelled (Note: The 2020 Berlin Marathon was originally scheduled for 27 September, but cancelled due to the COVID-19 pandemic in Germany to prevent large gatherings.)	Cancelled (Note: The 2020 Chicago Marathon was originally scheduled for 11 October, but was cancelled due to the COVID-19 pandemic.)	Cancelled (Note: The 2020 New York City Marathon was originally scheduled for 1 November, but was cancelled due to the COVID-19 pandemic.)	Not held	Postponed (Note: Postponed from 2 and 9 August due to the COVID-19 pandemic.)
2021	Postponed (Note: Ran in 2022 due to COVID-19 pandemic)	11 October	3 October	Not part of WMM	26 September	10 October	7 November	Postponed (Note: Postponed by one year due to COVID-19 pandemic and the resulting postponement of the 2020 Summer Olympics.)	8 Aug / 7 Aug (Sapporo)
2022	6 March (Note: Postponed race from 2021.)	18 April	2 October	Not part of WMM	25 September	9 October	6 November	17 July / 18 July (Eugene)	Not held
2023	5 March	17 April	23 April	Not part of WMM	24 September	8 October	5 November	26 August / 27 August (Budapest)	Not held
2024	3 March	15 April	21 April	Not part of WMM	29 September	13 October	3 November	Not held	10 August / 11 August (Paris)
2025	2 March	21 April	27 April	31 August	21 September	12 October	2 November	14 September / 15 September (Tokyo)	Not held
2026	1 March	20 April	26 April	30 August	27 September	11 October	1 November	Not held	Not held
Year	(Japan) Tokyo	(United States) Boston	(United Kingdom) London	(Australia) Sydney	(Germany) Berlin	(United States) Chicago	(United States) New York	World Athletics Championships	Olympic Games

== Major marathons champions ==
=== Men's ===
Year	Tokyo	Boston	London	Sydney	Berlin	Chicago	New York	World (WCh) or Olympic (OG)
2006	Not held	(Kenya) Robert Kipkoech Cheruiyot (1/4)	(Kenya) Felix Limo (1/1)	Was not part of WMM	(Ethiopia) Haile Gebrselassie (1/4)	(Kenya) Robert Kipkoech Cheruiyot (2/4)	(Brazil) Marílson Gomes dos Santos (1/2)	—N/a
2007	Was not part of WMM	(Kenya) Robert Kipkoech Cheruiyot (3/4)	(Kenya) Martin Lel (1/3)	Was not part of WMM	(Ethiopia) Haile Gebrselassie (2/4)	(Kenya) Patrick Ivuti (1/1)	(Kenya) Martin Lel (2/3)	(Kenya) Luke Kibet (Osaka) WCh
2008	Was not part of WMM	(Kenya) Robert Kipkoech Cheruiyot (4/4)	(Kenya) Martin Lel (3/3)	Was not part of WMM	(Ethiopia) Haile Gebrselassie (3/4)	(Kenya) Evans Cheruiyot (1/1)	(Brazil) Marílson Gomes dos Santos (2/2)	(Kenya) Samuel Wanjiru (Beijing) OG (1/4)
2009	Was not part of WMM	(Ethiopia) Deriba Merga (1/1)	(Kenya) Samuel Wanjiru (2/4)	Was not part of WMM	(Ethiopia) Haile Gebrselassie (4/4)	(Kenya) Samuel Wanjiru (3/4)	(United States) Meb Keflezighi (1/2)	(Kenya) Abel Kirui (Berlin) WCh (1/2)
2010	Was not part of WMM	(Kenya) Robert Kiprono Cheruiyot (1/1)	(Ethiopia) Tsegaye Kebede (1/3)	Was not part of WMM	(Kenya) Patrick Musyoki (1/2)	(Kenya) Samuel Wanjiru (4/4)	(Ethiopia) Gebregziabher Gebremariam (1/1)	—N/a
2011	Was not part of WMM	(Kenya) Geoffrey Mutai (1/4)	(Kenya) Emmanuel Mutai (1/1)	Was not part of WMM	(Kenya) Patrick Musyoki (2/2)	(Kenya) Moses Mosop (1/1)	(Kenya) Geoffrey Mutai (2/4)	(Kenya) Abel Kirui (Daegu) WCh (2/2)
2012	Was not part of WMM	(Kenya) Wesley Korir (1/1)	(Kenya) Wilson Kipsang (1/5)	Was not part of WMM	(Kenya) Geoffrey Mutai (3/4)	(Ethiopia) Tsegaye Kebede (2/3)	Cancelled due to Hurricane Sandy	(Uganda) Stephen Kiprotich (London) OG (1/2)
2013	(Kenya) Dennis Kimetto (1/3)	(Ethiopia) Lelisa Desisa (1/4)	(Ethiopia) Tsegaye Kebede (3/3)	Was not part of WMM	(Kenya) Wilson Kipsang (2/5)	(Kenya) Dennis Kimetto (2/3)	(Kenya) Geoffrey Mutai (4/4)	(Uganda) Stephen Kiprotich (Moscow) WCh (2/2)
2014	(Kenya) Dickson Chumba (1/3)	(United States) Meb Keflezighi (2/2)	(Kenya) Wilson Kipsang (3/5)	Was not part of WMM	(Kenya) Dennis Kimetto (3/3)	(Kenya) Eliud Kipchoge (1/13)	(Kenya) Wilson Kipsang (4/5)	—N/a
2015	(Ethiopia) Endeshaw Negesse (1/1)	(Ethiopia) Lelisa Desisa (2/4)	(Kenya) Eliud Kipchoge (2/13)	Was not part of WMM	(Kenya) Eliud Kipchoge (3/13)	(Kenya) Dickson Chumba (2/3)	(Kenya) Stanley Biwott (1/1)	(Eritrea) Ghirmay Ghebreslassie (Beijing) WCh
2016	(Ethiopia) Feyisa Lilesa (1/1)	(Ethiopia) Lemi Berhanu Hayle (1/1)	(Kenya) Eliud Kipchoge (4/13)	Was not part of WMM	(Ethiopia) Kenenisa Bekele (1/2)	(Kenya) Abel Kirui (1/1)	(Eritrea) Ghirmay Ghebreslassie (1/1)	(Kenya) Eliud Kipchoge (Rio de Janeiro) OG (5/13)
2017	(Kenya) Wilson Kipsang (5/5)	(Kenya) Geoffrey Kirui (1/2)	(Kenya) Daniel Wanjiru (1/1)	Was not part of WMM	(Kenya) Eliud Kipchoge (6/13)	(United States) Galen Rupp (1/1)	(Kenya) Geoffrey Kamworor (1/2)	(Kenya) Geoffrey Kirui (London) WCh (2/2)
2018	(Kenya) Dickson Chumba (3/3)	(Japan) Yuki Kawauchi (1/1)	(Kenya) Eliud Kipchoge (7/13)	Was not part of WMM	(Kenya) Eliud Kipchoge (8/13)	(United Kingdom) Mo Farah (1/1)	(Ethiopia) Lelisa Desisa (3/4)	—N/a
2019	(Ethiopia) Birhanu Legese (1/2)	(Kenya) Lawrence Cherono (1/2)	(Kenya) Eliud Kipchoge (9/13)	Was not part of WMM	(Ethiopia) Kenenisa Bekele (2/2)	(Kenya) Lawrence Cherono (2/2)	(Kenya) Geoffrey Kamworor (2/2)	(Ethiopia) Lelisa Desisa (Doha) WCh (4/4)
2020	(Ethiopia) Birhanu Legese (2/2)	Cancelled (COVID-19 pandemic)	(Ethiopia) Shura Kitata (1/1)	Was not part of WMM	Cancelled (COVID-19 pandemic)			Rescheduled
2021	Rescheduled	(Kenya) Benson Kipruto (1/4)	(Ethiopia) Sisay Lemma (1/2)	Was not part of WMM	(Ethiopia) Guye Adola (1/2)	(Ethiopia) Seifu Tura (1/1)	(Kenya) Albert Korir (1/1)	(Kenya) Eliud Kipchoge (Sapporo) OG (10/13)
2022	(Kenya) Eliud Kipchoge (11/13)	(Kenya) Evans Chebet (1/3)	(Kenya) Amos Kipruto (1/2)	Was not part of WMM	(Kenya) Eliud Kipchoge (12/13)	(Kenya) Benson Kipruto (2/4)	(Kenya) Evans Chebet (2/3)	(Ethiopia) Tamirat Tola (Eugene) WCh (1/3)
2023	(Ethiopia) Deso Gelmisa (1/1)	(Kenya) Evans Chebet (3/3)	(Kenya) Kelvin Kiptum (1/2)	Was not part of WMM	(Kenya) Eliud Kipchoge (13/13)	(Kenya) Kelvin Kiptum (2/2)	(Ethiopia) Tamirat Tola (2/3)	(Uganda) Victor Kiplangat (Budapest) WCh
2024	(Kenya) Benson Kipruto (3/4)	(Ethiopia) Sisay Lemma (2/2)	(Kenya) Alexander Mutiso Munyao (1/1)	Was not part of WMM	(Ethiopia) Milkesa Mengesha (1/1)	(Kenya) John Korir (1/3)	(Netherlands) Abdi Nageeye (1/1)	(Ethiopia) Tamirat Tola (Paris) OG (3/3)
2025	(Ethiopia) Tadese Takele (1/2)	(Kenya) John Korir (2/3)	(Kenya) Sabastian Sawe (1/3)	(Ethiopia) Hailemaryam Kiros (1/1)	(Kenya) Sabastian Sawe (2/3)	(Uganda) Jacob Kiplimo (1/1)	(Kenya) Benson Kipruto (4/4)	(Tanzania) Alphonce Simbu (Tokyo) WCh
2026	(Ethiopia) Tadese Takele (2/2)	(Kenya) John Korir (3/3)	(Kenya) Sabastian Sawe (3/3)	(Ethiopia) Addisu Gobena (1/1)	(Ethiopia) Guye Adola (2/2)	(Kenya) Amos Kipruto (2/2)	(Sweden) Andreas Almgren (1/1)	—N/a
Year	Tokyo	Boston	London	Sydney	Berlin	Chicago	New York	World (WCh) or Olympic (OG)

=== Women's ===
Year	Tokyo Marathon	Boston Marathon	London Marathon	Sydney Marathon	Berlin Marathon	Chicago Marathon	New York City Marathon	World (WCh) or Olympic (OG)
2006	Was not part of WMM	(Kenya) Rita Jeptoo (1/3)	(United States) Deena Kastor (1/1)	Was not part of WMM	(Ethiopia) Gete Wami (1/2)	(Ethiopia) Berhane Adere (1/2)	(Latvia) Jelena Prokopcuka (1/1)	—N/a
2007	Was not part of WMM	(Russia) Lidiya Grigoryeva (1/2)	(China) Zhou Chunxiu (1/1)	Was not part of WMM	(Ethiopia) Gete Wami (2/2)	(Ethiopia) Berhane Adere (2/2)	(United Kingdom) Paula Radcliffe (1/2)	(Kenya) Catherine Ndereba (Osaka) WCh
2008	Was not part of WMM	(Ethiopia) Dire Tune (1/1)	(Germany) Irina Mikitenko (1/4)	Was not part of WMM	(Germany) Irina Mikitenko (2/4)	(Russia) Lidiya Grigoryeva (2/2)	(United Kingdom) Paula Radcliffe (2/2)	(Romania) Constantina Tomescu (Beijing) OG
2009	Was not part of WMM	(Kenya) Salina Kosgei (1/1)	(Germany) Irina Mikitenko (3/4)	Was not part of WMM	(Ethiopia) Atsede Habtamu (1/1)	(Germany) Irina Mikitenko (4/4)	(Ethiopia) Derartu Tulu (1/1)	(China) Bai Xue (Berlin) WCh
2010	Was not part of WMM	(Ethiopia) Teyba Erkesso (1/1)	(Ethiopia) Aselefech Mergia (1/1)	Was not part of WMM	(Ethiopia) Aberu Kebede (1/4)	(Ethiopia) Atsede Baysa (1/3)	(Kenya) Edna Kiplagat (1/6)	—N/a
2011	Was not part of WMM	(Kenya) Caroline Kilel (1/1)	(Kenya) Mary Keitany (1/7)	Was not part of WMM	(Kenya) Florence Kiplagat (1/4)	(Ethiopia) Ejegayehu Dibaba (1/1)	(Ethiopia) Firehiwot Dado (1/1)	(Kenya) Edna Kiplagat (Daegu) WCh (2/6)
2012	Was not part of WMM	(Kenya) Sharon Cherop (1/1)	(Kenya) Mary Keitany (2/7)	Was not part of WMM	(Ethiopia) Aberu Kebede (2/4)	(Ethiopia) Atsede Baysa (2/3)	Cancelled due to Hurricane Sandy	(Ethiopia) Tiki Gelana (London) OG
2013	(Ethiopia) Aberu Kebede (3/4)	(Kenya) Rita Jeptoo (2/3)	(Kenya) Priscah Jeptoo (1/2)	Was not part of WMM	(Kenya) Florence Kiplagat (2/4)	(Kenya) Rita Jeptoo (3/3)	(Kenya) Priscah Jeptoo (2/2)	(Kenya) Edna Kiplagat (Moscow) WCh (3/6)
2014	(Ethiopia) Tirfi Tsegaye (1/2)	(Ethiopia) Bizunesh Deba (1/1)	(Kenya) Edna Kiplagat (4/6)	Was not part of WMM	(Ethiopia) Tirfi Tsegaye (2/2)	(Ethiopia) Mare Dibaba (1/2)	(Kenya) Mary Keitany (3/7)	—N/a
2015	(Ethiopia) Birhane Dibaba (1/2)	(Kenya) Caroline Rotich (1/1)	(Ethiopia) Tigist Tufa (1/1)	Was not part of WMM	(Kenya) Gladys Cherono (1/3)	(Kenya) Florence Kiplagat (3/4)	(Kenya) Mary Keitany (4/7)	(Ethiopia) Mare Dibaba (Beijing) WCh (2/2)
2016	(Kenya) Helah Kiprop (1/1)	(Ethiopia) Atsede Baysa (3/3)	(Kenya) Jemima Sumgong (1/2)	Was not part of WMM	(Ethiopia) Aberu Kebede (4/4)	(Kenya) Florence Kiplagat (4/4)	(Kenya) Mary Keitany (5/7)	(Kenya) Jemima Sumgong (Rio de Janeiro) OG (2/2)
2017	(Kenya) Sarah Chepchirchir (1/1)	(Kenya) Edna Kiplagat (5/6)	(Kenya) Mary Keitany (6/7)	Was not part of WMM	(Kenya) Gladys Cherono (2/3)	(Ethiopia) Tirunesh Dibaba (1/1)	(United States) Shalane Flanagan (1/1)	(Bahrain) Rose Chelimo (London) WCh
2018	(Ethiopia) Birhane Dibaba (2/2)	(United States) Desiree Linden (1/1)	(Kenya) Vivian Cheruiyot (1/1)	Was not part of WMM	(Kenya) Gladys Cherono (3/3)	(Kenya) Brigid Kosgei (1/6)	(Kenya) Mary Keitany (7/7)	—N/a
2019	(Ethiopia) Ruti Aga (1/1)	(Ethiopia) Worknesh Degefa (1/1)	(Kenya) Brigid Kosgei (2/6)	Was not part of WMM	(Ethiopia) Ashete Bekere (1/1)	(Kenya) Brigid Kosgei (3/6)	(Kenya) Joyciline Jepkosgei (1/2)	(Kenya) Ruth Chepng'etich (Doha) WCh (1/4)
2020	(Israel) Lonah Chemtai Salpeter (1/1)	Cancelled (COVID-19 pandemic)	(Kenya) Brigid Kosgei (4/6)	Was not part of WMM	Cancelled (COVID-19 pandemic)			Rescheduled
2021	Rescheduled	(Kenya) Edna Kiplagat (Note: Diana Kipyogei (KEN) was the original winner, but she was disqualified for a doping violation.) (6/6)	(Kenya) Joyciline Jepkosgei (2/2)	Was not part of WMM	(Ethiopia) Gotytom Gebreslase (1/2)	(Kenya) Ruth Chepng'etich (2/4)	(Kenya) Peres Jepchirchir (2/6)	(Kenya) Peres Jepchirchir (Sapporo) OG (1/6)
2022	(Kenya) Brigid Kosgei (5/6)	(Kenya) Peres Jepchirchir (3/6)	(Ethiopia) Yalemzerf Yehualaw (1/1)	Was not part of WMM	(Ethiopia) Tigst Assefa (1/5)	(Kenya) Ruth Chepng'etich (3/4)	(Kenya) Sharon Lokedi (1/3)	(Ethiopia) Gotytom Gebreslase (Eugene) WCh (2/2)
2023	(Kenya) Rosemary Wanjiru (1/2)	(Kenya) Hellen Obiri (1/4)	(Netherlands) Sifan Hassan (1/4)	Was not part of WMM	(Ethiopia) Tigst Assefa (2/5)	(Netherlands) Sifan Hassan (2/4)	(Kenya) Hellen Obiri (2/4)	(Ethiopia) Amane Beriso (Budapest) WCh
2024	(Ethiopia) Sutume Kebede (1/2)	(Kenya) Hellen Obiri (3/4)	(Kenya) Peres Jepchirchir (4/6)	Was not part of WMM	(Ethiopia) Tigist Ketema (1/1)	(Kenya) Ruth Chepng'etich (4/4)	(Kenya) Sheila Chepkirui (1/2)	(Netherlands) Sifan Hassan (Paris) OG (3/4)
2025	(Ethiopia) Sutume Kebede (2/2)	(Kenya) Sharon Lokedi (2/3)	(Ethiopia) Tigst Assefa (3/5)	(Netherlands) Sifan Hassan (4/4)	(Kenya) Rosemary Wanjiru (2/2)	(Ethiopia) Hawi Feysa (1/2)	(Kenya) Hellen Obiri (4/4)	(Kenya) Peres Jepchirchir (Tokyo) WCh (5/6)
2026	(Kenya) Brigid Kosgei (6/6)	(Kenya) Sharon Lokedi (3/3)	(Ethiopia) Tigst Assefa (4/5)	(Kenya) Peres Jepchirchir ((6/6)	(Ethiopia) Tigst Assefa (5/5)	(Ethiopia) Hawi Feysa (2/2)	(Kenya) Sheila Chepkirui (2/2)	—N/a
Year	Tokyo	Boston	London	Sydney	Berlin	Chicago	New York	World (WCh) or Olympic (OG)

=== Men's wheelchair ===
Year	Tokyo Marathon	Boston Marathon	London Marathon	Sydney Marathon	Berlin Marathon	Chicago Marathon	New York City Marathon
2016	Was not part of WMM	(Switzerland) Marcel Hug (1/43)	(Switzerland) Marcel Hug (2/43)	Was not part of WMM	(Switzerland) Marcel Hug (3/43)	(Switzerland) Marcel Hug (4/43)	(Switzerland) Marcel Hug (5/43)
2017	(Japan) Sho Watanabe (1/1)	(Switzerland) Marcel Hug (6/43)	(United Kingdom) David Weir (1/2)	Was not part of WMM	(Switzerland) Marcel Hug (7/43)	(Switzerland) Marcel Hug (8/43)	(Switzerland) Marcel Hug (9/43)
2018	(Japan) Hiroyuki Yamamoto (1/1)	(Switzerland) Marcel Hug (10/43)	(United Kingdom) David Weir (2/2)	Was not part of WMM	(Canada) Brent Lakatos (1/2)	(United States) Daniel Romanchuk (1/10)	(United States) Daniel Romanchuk (2/10)
2019	(Switzerland) Marcel Hug (11/43)	(United States) Daniel Romanchuk (3/10)	(United States) Daniel Romanchuk (4/10)	Was not part of WMM	(Switzerland) Marcel Hug (12/43)	(United States) Daniel Romanchuk (5/10)	(United States) Daniel Romanchuk (6/10)
2020	(Japan) Tomoki Suzuki (1/3)	Cancelled (COVID-19 pandemic)	(Canada) Brent Lakatos (2/2)	Was not part of WMM	Cancelled (COVID-19 pandemic)		
2021	Rescheduled	(Switzerland) Marcel Hug (13/43)	(Switzerland) Marcel Hug (14/43)	Was not part of WMM	(Switzerland) Marcel Hug (15/43)	(United States) Daniel Romanchuk (7/10)	(Switzerland) Marcel Hug (16/43)
2022	(Switzerland) Marcel Hug (17/43)	(United States) Daniel Romanchuk (8/10)	(Switzerland) Marcel Hug (18/43)	Was not part of WMM	(Switzerland) Marcel Hug (19/43)	(Switzerland) Marcel Hug (20/43)	(Switzerland) Marcel Hug (21/43)
2023	(Switzerland) Marcel Hug (22/43)	(Switzerland) Marcel Hug (23/43)	(Switzerland) Marcel Hug (24/43)	Was not part of WMM	(Switzerland) Marcel Hug (25/43)	(Switzerland) Marcel Hug (26/43)	(Switzerland) Marcel Hug (27/43)
2024	(Japan) Tomoki Suzuki (2/3)	(Switzerland) Marcel Hug (28/43)	(Switzerland) Marcel Hug (29/43)	Was not part of WMM	(Switzerland) Marcel Hug (30/43)	(Switzerland) Marcel Hug (31/43)	(United States) Daniel Romanchuk (9/10)
2025	(Japan) Tomoki Suzuki (3/3)	(Switzerland) Marcel Hug (32/43)	(Switzerland) Marcel Hug (33/43)	(Switzerland) Marcel Hug (34/43)	(Switzerland) Marcel Hug (35/43)	(Switzerland) Marcel Hug (36/43)	(Switzerland) Marcel Hug (37/43)
2026	(Switzerland) Marcel Hug (38/43)	(Switzerland) Marcel Hug (39/43)	(Switzerland) Marcel Hug (40/43)	(United States) Daniel Romanchuk (10/10)	(Switzerland) Marcel Hug (41/43)	(Switzerland) Marcel Hug (42/43)	(Switzerland) Marcel Hug (43/43)
Year	Tokyo	Boston	London	Sydney	Berlin	Chicago	New York

=== Women's wheelchair ===
Year	Tokyo Marathon	Boston Marathon	London Marathon	Sydney Marathon	Berlin Marathon	Chicago Marathon	New York City Marathon
2016	Was not part of WMM	(United States) Tatyana McFadden (1/7)	(United States) Tatyana McFadden (2/7)	Was not part of WMM	(Switzerland) Manuela Schär (1/23)	(United States) Tatyana McFadden (3/7)	(United States) Tatyana McFadden (4/7)
2017	(United States) Amanda McGrory (1/1)	(Switzerland) Manuela Schär (2/23)	(Switzerland) Manuela Schär (3/23)	Was not part of WMM	(Switzerland) Manuela Schär (4/23)	(United States) Tatyana McFadden (5/7)	(Switzerland) Manuela Schär (5/23)
2018	(Switzerland) Manuela Schär (6/23)	(United States) Tatyana McFadden (6/7)	(Australia) Madison de Rozario (1/3)	Was not part of WMM	(Switzerland) Manuela Schär (7/23)	(Switzerland) Manuela Schär (8/23)	(Switzerland) Manuela Schär (9/23)
2019	(Switzerland) Manuela Schär (10/23)	(Switzerland) Manuela Schär (11/23)	(Switzerland) Manuela Schär (12/23)	Was not part of WMM	(Switzerland) Manuela Schär (13/23)	(Switzerland) Manuela Schär (14/23)	(Switzerland) Manuela Schär (15/23)
2020	(Japan) Tsubasa Kina (1/2)	Cancelled (COVID-19 pandemic)	(Netherlands) Nikita den Boer (1/1)	Was not part of WMM	Cancelled (COVID-19 pandemic)		
2021	Rescheduled	(Switzerland) Manuela Schär (16/23)	(Switzerland) Manuela Schär (17/23)	Was not part of WMM	(Switzerland) Manuela Schär (18/23)	(United States) Tatyana McFadden (7/7)	(Australia) Madison de Rozario (2/3)
2022	(Japan) Tsubasa Kina (2/2)	(Switzerland) Manuela Schär (19/23)	(Switzerland) Catherine Debrunner (1/15)	Was not part of WMM	(Switzerland) Catherine Debrunner (2/15)	(United States) Susannah Scaroni (1/8)	(United States) Susannah Scaroni (2/8)
2023	(Switzerland) Manuela Schär (20/23)	(United States) Susannah Scaroni (3/8)	(Australia) Madison de Rozario (3/3)	Was not part of WMM	(Switzerland) Catherine Debrunner (3/15)	(Switzerland) Catherine Debrunner (4/15)	(Switzerland) Catherine Debrunner (5/15)
2024	(Switzerland) Manuela Schär (21/23)	(United Kingdom) Eden Rainbow-Cooper (1/2)	(Switzerland) Catherine Debrunner (6/15)	Was not part of WMM	(Switzerland) Catherine Debrunner (7/15)	(Switzerland) Catherine Debrunner (8/15)	(United States) Susannah Scaroni (4/8)
2025	(Switzerland) Catherine Debrunner (9/15)	(United States) Susannah Scaroni (5/8)	(Switzerland) Catherine Debrunner (10/15)	(United States) Susannah Scaroni (6/8)	(Switzerland) Manuela Schär (22/23)	(United States) Susannah Scaroni (7/8)	(United States) Susannah Scaroni (8/8)
2026	(Switzerland) Catherine Debrunner (11/15)	(United Kingdom) Eden Rainbow-Cooper (2/2)	(Switzerland) Catherine Debrunner (12/15)	(Switzerland) Manuela Schär (23/23)	(Switzerland) Catherine Debrunner (13/15)	(Switzerland) Catherine Debrunner (14/15)	(Switzerland) Catherine Debrunner (15/15)
Year	Tokyo	Boston	London	Sydney	Berlin	Chicago	New York

== World Marathon Majors champions list ==
=== Men's ===
Titles	Winner	Tokyo Marathon	Boston Marathon	London Marathon	Sydney Marathon	Berlin Marathon	Chicago Marathon	New York City Marathon	Years
11	(Kenya) Eliud Kipchoge	1	0	4	0	5	1	0	2014–2023
5	(Kenya) Wilson Kipsang	1	0	2	0	1	0	1	2012–2017
4	(Kenya) Robert Kipkoech Cheruiyot	0	3	0	0	0	1	0	2006–2008
4	(Ethiopia) Haile Gebrselassie	0	0	0	0	4	0	0	2006–2009
4	(Kenya) Geoffrey Mutai	0	1	0	0	1	0	2	2011–2013
4	(Kenya) Benson Kipruto	1	1	0	0	0	1	1	2021–2025
3	(Kenya) Martin Lel	0	0	2	0	0	0	1	2007–2008
3	(Kenya) Samuel Wanjiru	0	0	1	0	0	2	0	2009–2010
3	(Ethiopia) Tsegaye Kebede	0	0	2	0	0	1	0	2010–2013
3	(Kenya) Dennis Kipruto Kimetto	1	0	0	0	1	1	0	2013–2014
3	(Ethiopia) Lelisa Desisa	0	2	0	0	0	0	1	2013–2018
3	(Kenya) Dickson Chumba	2	0	0	0	0	1	0	2014–2018
3	(Kenya) Evans Chebet	0	2	0	0	0	0	1	2022–2023
3	(Kenya) John Korir	0	2	0	0	0	1	0	2024–2026
3	(Kenya) Sabastian Sawe	0	0	2	0	1	0	0	2025–2026
2	(Brazil) Marílson Gomes dos Santos	0	0	0	0	0	0	2	2006–2008
2	(United States) Meb Keflezighi	0	1	0	0	0	0	1	2009–2014
2	(Kenya) Patrick Musyoki	0	0	0	0	2	0	0	2010–2011
2	(Ethiopia) Kenenisa Bekele	0	0	0	0	2	0	0	2016–2019
2	(Kenya) Geoffrey Kamworor	0	0	0	0	0	0	2	2017–2019
2	(Kenya) Lawrence Cherono	0	1	0	0	0	1	0	2019
2	(Ethiopia) Birhanu Legese	2	0	0	0	0	0	0	2019–2020
2	(Ethiopia) Sisay Lemma	0	1	1	0	0	0	0	2021–2024
2	(Kenya) Kelvin Kiptum	0	0	1	0	0	1	0	2023
2	(Ethiopia) Guye Adola	0	0	0	0	2	0	0	2021–2026
2	(Kenya) Amos Kipruto	0	0	1	0	0	1	0	2022–2026
2	(Ethiopia) Tadese Takele	2	0	0	0	0	0	0	2025–2026

=== Women's ===
Titles	Winner	Tokyo Marathon	Boston Marathon	London Marathon	Sydney Marathon	Berlin Marathon	Chicago Marathon	New York City Marathon	Years
7	(Kenya) Mary Keitany	0	0	3	0	0	0	4	2011–2018
6	(Kenya) Brigid Kosgei	2	0	2	0	0	2	0	2018–2026
5	(Ethiopia) Tigist Assefa	0	0	2	0	3	0	0	2022–2026
4	(Germany) Irina Mikitenko	0	0	2	0	1	1	0	2008–2009
4	(Ethiopia) Aberu Kebede	1	0	0	0	3	0	0	2010–2016
4	(Kenya) Edna Kiplagat	0	2	1	0	0	0	1	2010–2021
4	(Kenya) Florence Kiplagat	0	0	0	0	2	2	0	2011–2016
4	(Kenya) Hellen Obiri	0	2	0	0	0	0	2	2023–2025
4	(Kenya) Peres Jepchirchir	0	1	1	1	0	0	1	2021–2026
3	(Kenya) Rita Jeptoo	0	0	2	0	0	1	0	2006–2013
3	(Ethiopia) Atsede Baysa	0	1	0	0	0	2	0	2010–2016
3	(Kenya) Gladys Cherono	0	0	0	0	3	0	0	2015–2018
3	(Kenya) Ruth Chepng'etich	0	0	0	0	0	3	0	2021–2024
3	(Netherlands) Sifan Hassan	0	0	1	1	0	1	0	2023–2025
3	(Kenya) Sharon Lokedi	0	2	0	0	0	0	1	2022–2026
2	(Ethiopia) Gete Wami	0	0	0	0	2	0	0	2006–2007
2	(Ethiopia) Berhane Adere	0	0	0	0	0	2	0	2006–2007
2	(Russia) Lidiya Grigoryeva	0	1	0	0	0	1	0	2007–2008
2	(United Kingdom) Paula Radcliffe	0	0	0	0	0	0	2	2007–2008
2	(Kenya) Priscah Jeptoo	0	0	1	0	0	0	1	2013
2	(Ethiopia) Tirfi Tsegaye	1	0	0	0	1	0	0	2014
2	(Ethiopia) Birhane Dibaba	2	0	0	0	0	0	0	2015–2018
2	(Kenya) Joyciline Jepkosgei	0	0	1	0	0	0	1	2019–2021
2	(Kenya) Rosemary Wanjiru	1	0	0	0	1	0	0	2023–2025
2	(Ethiopia) Sutume Kebede	2	0	0	0	0	0	0	2024–2025
2	(Ethiopia) Hawi Feysa	0	0	0	0	0	2	0	2025–2026
2	(Kenya) Sheila Chepkirui	0	0	0	0	0	0	2	2024–2026

== Winners by season ==
The winners by season listed below.

=== Men's series winners ===
Season	No.	Start event	Final event	Winner	Country	Points	Notes	Ref
2006–07	I	2006 Boston	2007 New York City	Robert Kipkoech Cheruiyot	Kenya	80 points		
2007–08	II	2007 Boston	2008 New York City	Martin Lel	Kenya	76 points		
2008–09	III	2008 Boston	2009 New York City	Samuel Wanjiru	Kenya	80 points		
2009–10	IV	2009 Boston	2010 New York City	Samuel Wanjiru (2)	Kenya	75 points		
2010–11	V	2010 Boston	2011 New York City	Emmanuel Mutai	Kenya	70 points		
2011–12	VI	2011 Boston	2012 Chicago	Geoffrey Mutai	Kenya	75 points		
2012–13	VII	2012 Boston	2013 New York City	Tsegaye Kebede	Ethiopia	75 points		
2013–14	VIII	2013 Tokyo	2014 New York City	Wilson Kipsang	Kenya	76 points		
2015–16	IX	2015 Tokyo	2016 Tokyo	Eliud Kipchoge	Kenya	50 points		
2016–17	X	2016 Boston	2017 Boston	Eliud Kipchoge (2)	Kenya	50 points		
2017–18	XI	2017 London	2018 London	Eliud Kipchoge (3)	Kenya	50 points		
2018–19	XII	2018 Berlin	2019 Berlin	Eliud Kipchoge (4)	Kenya	50 points		
2019–21	XIII	2019 Chicago	2021 New York City	Albert Korir	Kenya	41 points		
2022	XIV	2021 Tokyo	2022 New York City	Eliud Kipchoge (5)	Kenya	50 points		
2023	XV	2023 Tokyo	2023 New York City	Kelvin Kiptum	Kenya	50 points		
2024	XVI	2024 Tokyo	2024 New York City	Benson Kipruto	Kenya	34 points		
2025	XVII	2025 London	2025 Berlin	Sabastian Sawe	Kenya	50 points		

=== Women's series winners ===
Season	No.	Start event	Final event	Winner	Country	Points	Notes	Ref
2006–07	I	2006 Boston	2007 New York City	Gete Wami	Ethiopia	80 points		
2007–08	II	2007 Boston	2008 New York City	Irina Mikitenko	Germany	65 points	Tied with Gete Wami; but deemed winner by race directors' vote	
2008–09	III	2008 Boston	2009 New York City	Irina Mikitenko (2)	Germany	90 points		
2009–10	IV	2009 Boston	2010 New York City	Irina Mikitenko (3)	Germany	55 points	Awarded after a doping case against original winner (Note: Liliya Shobukhova (Russia) was the original winner in Series IV and V but she was disqualified from competition for a doping violation in April 2014 and all her results from 9 October 2009 have been annulled.)	
2010–11	V	2010 Boston	2011 New York City	Edna Kiplagat	Kenya	60 points	Awarded after a doping case against original winner	
2011–12	VI	2011 Boston	2012 Chicago	Mary Keitany	Kenya	65 points		
2012–13	VII	2012 Boston	2013 New York City	Priscah Jeptoo	Kenya	75 points		
2013–14	VIII	2013 Tokyo	2014 New York City	Edna Kiplagat (2)	Kenya	65 points	Awarded after a doping case against original winner (Note: Rita Jeptoo (Kenya) won four races in the 2013–14 series but gave positive A and B samples in an out-of-competition test in September 2014.)	
2015–16	IX	2015 Tokyo	2016 Tokyo	Mary Keitany (2)	Kenya	41 points	Tied with Mare Dibaba & Helah Kiprop; winner by race directors' vote	
2016–17	X	2016 Boston	2017 Boston	Edna Kiplagat (3)	Kenya	41 points	Awarded after a doping case against original winner (Note: Jemima Sumgong (Kenya), who won two races in 2016 but gave a positive sample in an out-of-competition test in February 2017.)	
2017–18	XI	2017 London	2018 London	Mary Keitany (3)	Kenya	41 points	Winner due to better head-to-head record versus Tirunesh Dibaba	
2018–19	XII	2018 Berlin	2019 Berlin	Brigid Kosgei	Kenya	50 points		
2019–21	XIII	2019 Chicago	2021 New York City	Peres Jepchirchir; Joyciline Jepkosgei	Kenya; Kenya	50 points	Joint champions with two wins each	
2022	XIV	2021 Tokyo	2022 New York City	Gotytom Gebreslase	Ethiopia			
2023	XV	2023 Tokyo	2023 New York City	Sifan Hassan	Netherlands	50 points	Tied with Hellen Obiri; winner by race directors' vote	
2024	XVI	2024 Tokyo	2024 New York City	Hellen Obiri	Kenya	41 points	Tied with Sutume Asefa Kebede; winner by race directors' vote	
2025	XVII	2025 Boston	2025 New York City	Hellen Obiri (2); Sharon Lokedi; Tigst Assefa	Kenya; Kenya; Ethiopia	41 points	Race directors decided they should share the title	

=== Men's wheelchair series winners ===
Season	No.	Start event	Final event	Winner	Country	Points	Notes	Ref
2016–17	X	2016 Boston	2017 Boston	Marcel Hug	Switzerland			
2017–18	XI	2017 London	2018 London	Marcel Hug (2)	Switzerland			
2018–19	XII	2018 Berlin	2019 Berlin	Daniel Romanchuk	United States			
2019–21	XIII	2019 Chicago	2021 New York City	Marcel Hug (3)	Switzerland			
2022	XIV	2021 Tokyo	2022 New York City	Marcel Hug (4)	Switzerland			
2023	XV	2023 Tokyo	2023 New York City	Marcel Hug (5)	Switzerland			
2024	XVI	2024 Tokyo	2024 New York City	Marcel Hug (6)	Switzerland			
2025	XVII	2025 Boston	2025 New York City	Marcel Hug (7)	Switzerland			

=== Women's wheelchair series winners ===
Season	No.	Start event	Final event	Winner	Country	Points	Notes	Ref
2016–17	X	2016 Boston	2017 Boston	Tatyana McFadden	United States			
2017–18	XI	2017 London	2018 London	Manuela Schär	Switzerland			
2018–19	XII	2018 Berlin	2019 Berlin	Manuela Schär (2)	Switzerland			
2019–21	XIII	2019 Chicago	2021 New York City	Manuela Schär (3)	Switzerland			
2022	XIV	2021 Tokyo	2022 New York City	Susannah Scaroni	United States			
2023	XV	2023 Tokyo	2023 New York City	Catherine Debrunner	Switzerland			
2024	XVI	2024 Tokyo	2024 New York City	Catherine Debrunner (2)	Switzerland			
2025	XVII	2025 Boston	2025 New York City	Susannah Scaroni (2)	United States			

== Majors milestones ==
- Most victories – 13, Eliud Kipchoge (men); 7, Mary Keitany (women)
- Most scoring races – 13, Tsegaye Kebede, Wilson Kipsang (men); 14, Edna Kiplagat, Mary Keitany (women)
- Most lifetime scoring points – 265, Eliud Kipchoge (men); 234, Mary Keitany (women)
- Youngest winner – 20 years 281 days, Ghirmay Ghebreslassie (men); 20 years, 253 days, Xue Bai (women)
- Youngest point scorer – 18 years 302 days, Tsegaye Mekonnen (men); 19 years 233 days, Ayaka Fujimoto (women)
- Oldest winner – 38 years 350 days, Meb Keflezighi (men); 41 years 330 days, Edna Kiplagat (women)
- Oldest point scorer – 41 years 313 days, Kenenisa Bekele (men); 41 years 330 days, Edna Kiplagat (women)
- Nation, most winners – 52, Kenya (men); 35, Kenya (women)

== Six star finishers ==
Six star finishers are marathoners who have completed the first six races (by join date) in the World Marathon Majors (Berlin, Boston, Chicago, London, New York, Tokyo). The Six Star Finisher Medal was introduced in 2016 following the addition of Tokyo to WMM. In July 2018 a "Reach for the Stars" campaign was launched wherein a runner could claim a star for each WMM race completed. The system allows runners to create a profile, search for their ‘stars’ and add them to their page.

After the addition of Sydney (2024) and Cape Town (2026) to WMM, the Six Star medal remained in place for the original six races only. Pending the potential addition of Shanghai to WMM, Abbott World Marathon Majors announced that they would create a new Nine Star medal for the expanded race series.

As of the completion of the London Marathon in April 2025, 22,480 runners from 139 nations had become Six Star Finishers.

== See also ==
- World Athletics Label Road Races
- List of World Athletics Label marathon races
- List of final standings of the World Marathon Majors
