= 2009 Boston Marathon =

Footrace in Boston, Massachusetts, USA

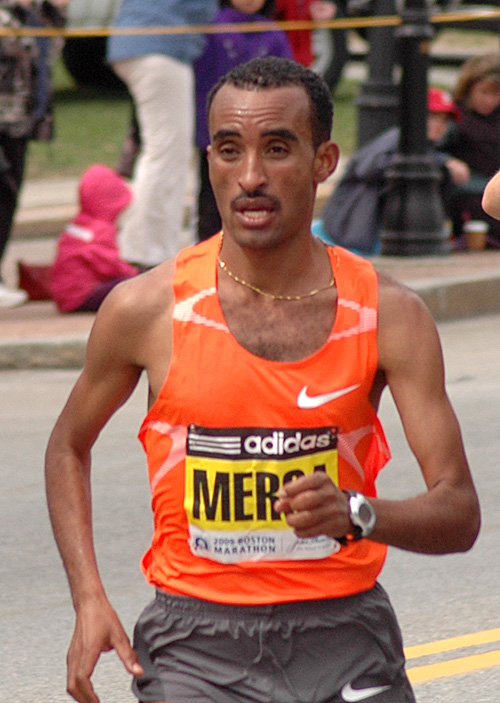
- Deriba Merga during the race
- Venue: Boston, United States
- Dates: April 20

Champions
- Men: Deriba Merga (2:08:42)
- Women: Salina Kosgei (2:32:16)

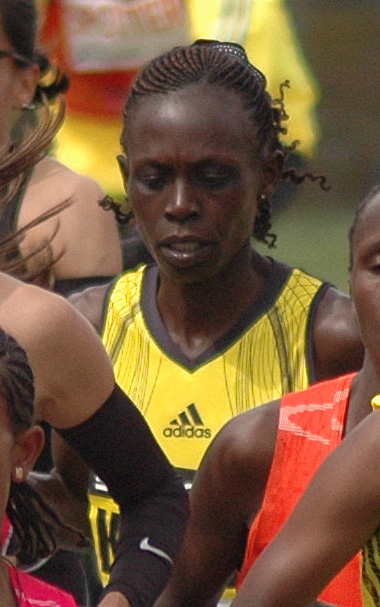
Salina Kosgei during the race

The 2009 Boston Marathon was the 113th running of the annual marathon race in Boston, United States and was held on April 20. The elite men's race was won by Ethiopia's Deriba Merga in a time of 2:08:42 hours and the women's race was won by Ethiopia's Salina Kosgei in 2:32:16.

== Results ==
=== Men ===
Position	Athlete	Nationality	Time
1	Deriba Merga	Ethiopia	2:08:42
2	Daniel Rono	Kenya	2:09:32
3	Ryan Hall	United States	2:09:40
4	Kebede Tekeste	Ethiopia	2:09:49
5	Robert Kipkoech Cheruiyot	Kenya	2:10:06
6	Gashaw Asfaw	Ethiopia	2:10:44
7	Solomon Molla	Ethiopia	2:12:02
8	Evans Cheruiyot	Kenya	2:12:45
9	Stephen Kiogora	Kenya	2:13:00
10	Timothy Cherigat	United States	2:13:04

=== Women ===
Position	Athlete	Nationality	Time
1	Salina Kosgei	Kenya	2:32:16
2	Dire Tune	Ethiopia	2:32:17
3	Kara Goucher	United States	2:32:25
4	Bezunesh Bekele	Ethiopia	2:33:08
5	Helena Kirop	Kenya	2:33:24
6	Lidiya Grigoryeva	Russia	2:34:24
7	Atsede Habtamu	Ethiopia	2:35:34
8	Colleen De Reuck	United States	2:35:37
9	Alice Timbilil	Kenya	2:36:25
10	Alina Ivanova	Russia	2:36:50
