= 2016 Tokyo Marathon =

10th Tokyo Marathon
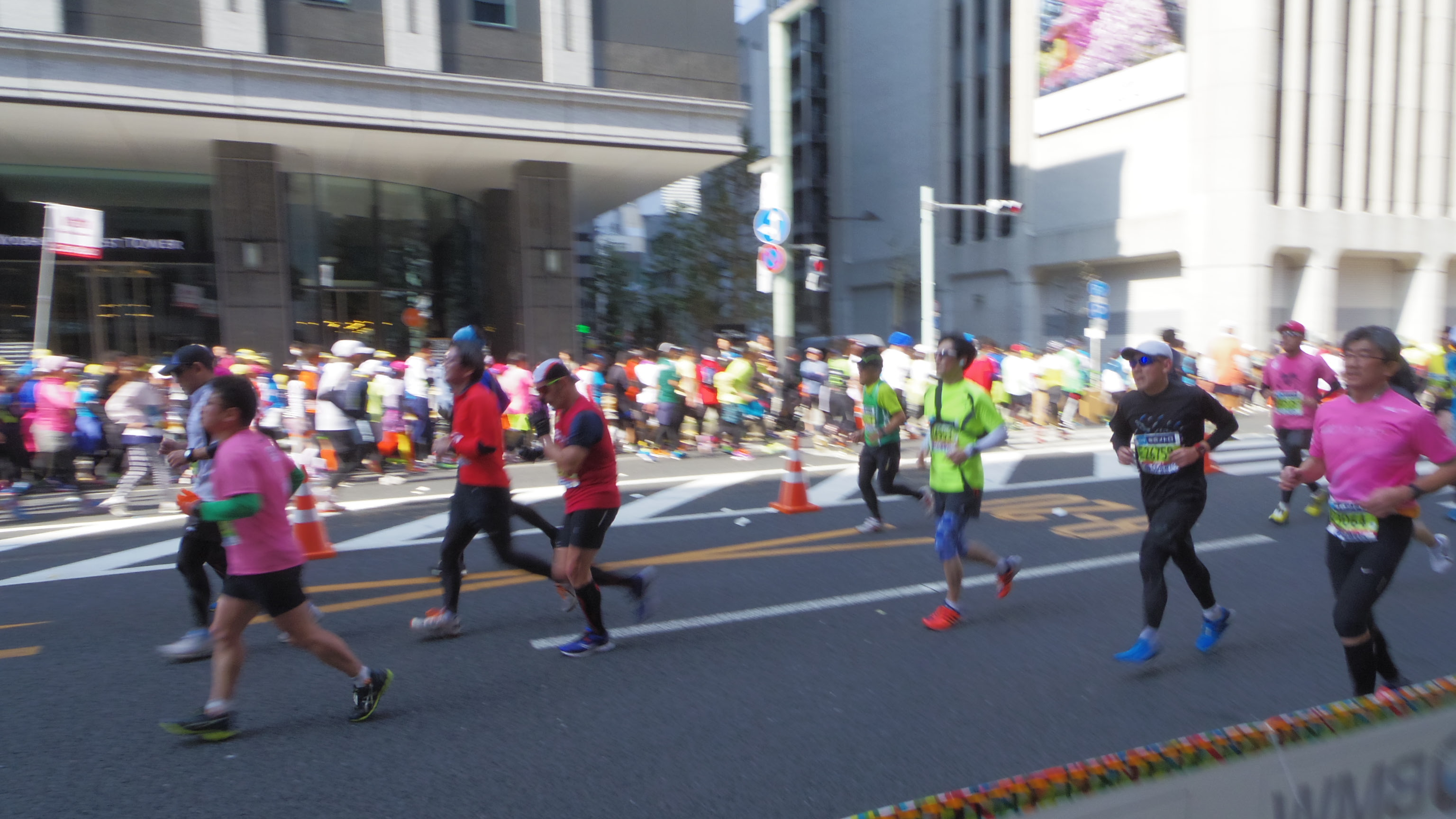
- Tokyo Marathon 2016
- Venue: Tokyo, Japan
- Dates: 28 February

The 2016 Tokyo Marathon (Japanese: 東京マラソン 2016) was the tenth edition of the annual marathon race in Tokyo, Japan and was held on Sunday, 28 February. An IAAF Gold Label Road Race, it was the first World Marathon Majors event to be held that year.

== Results ==
=== Men ===
Position	Athlete	Nationality	Time
1st place, gold medalist(s)	Feyisa Lilesa	Ethiopia	2:06:56
2nd place, silver medalist(s)	Bernard Kipyego	Kenya	2:07:33
3rd place, bronze medalist(s)	Dickson Chumba	Kenya	2:07:34
4	Stephen Kiprotich	Uganda	2:07:46
5	Abel Kirui	Kenya	2:08:06
6	Eliud Kiptanui	Kenya	2:08:55
7	Emmanuel Kipchirchir Mutai	Kenya	2:10:23
8	Yuki Takamiya	Japan	2:10:57
9	Javier Guerra	Spain	2:11:01
10	Yuta Shimoda	Japan	2:11:34

=== Women ===
Position	Athlete	Nationality	Time
1st place, gold medalist(s)	Helah Kiprop	Kenya	2:21:27
2nd place, silver medalist(s)	Amane Gobena	Ethiopia	2:21:51
3rd place, bronze medalist(s)	Edna Kiplagat	Kenya	2:22:36
4	Aberu Kebede	Ethiopia	2:23:01
5	Birhane Dibaba	Ethiopia	2:23:16
6	Shure Demise	Ethiopia	2:25:04
7	Ashete Bekere	Ethiopia	2:25:50
8	Maja Neuenschwander	Switzerland	2:27:36
9	Isabellah Andersson	Sweden	2:30:02
10	Yukiko Okuno	Japan	2:31:17

=== Wheelchair ===
The Elite Wheelchair race acted as a qualifier for the 2016 Summer Paralympics in Rio. A top three finish or a qualifying time of 1:28:30 (men) or 1:46:00 (women) gave competitors a berth for the Rio Games.

Men
Place	Athlete	Nationality	Time
1	Kurt Fearnley	Australia	1:26:00
2	Ernst van Dyk	South Africa	1:26:01
3	Kota Hokinoue	Japan	1:26:01

Women
Place	Athlete	Nationality	Time
1	Wakako Tsuchida	Japan	1:41:04
2	Tatyana McFadden	United States	1:41:14
