= 2010 Boston Marathon =

Footrace in Boston, Massachusetts, USA

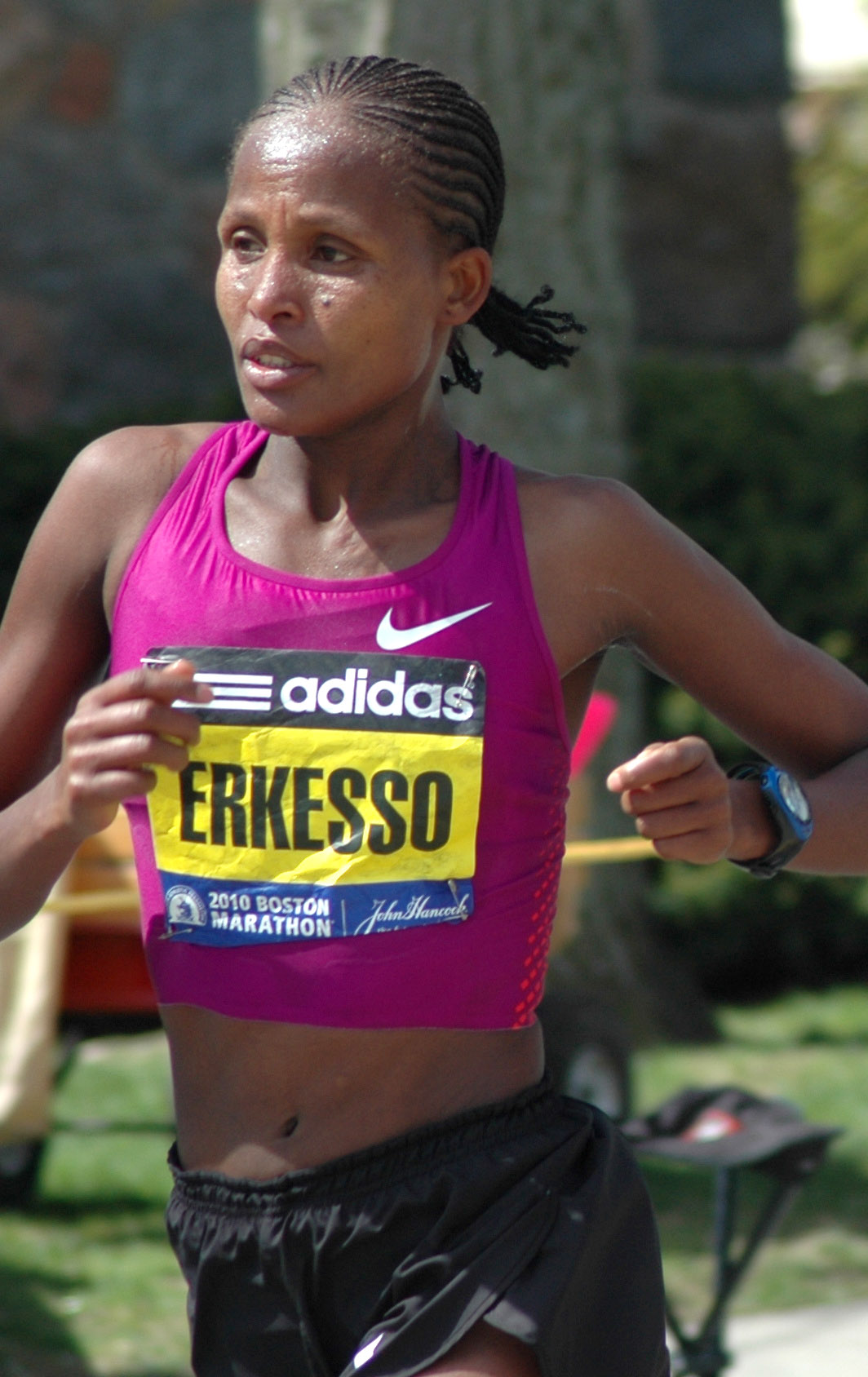
- Teyba Erkesso during the race
- Venue: Boston, United States
- Dates: April 19

Champions
- Men: Robert Kiprono Cheruiyot (2:06:24)
- Women: Teyba Erkesso (2:26:11)

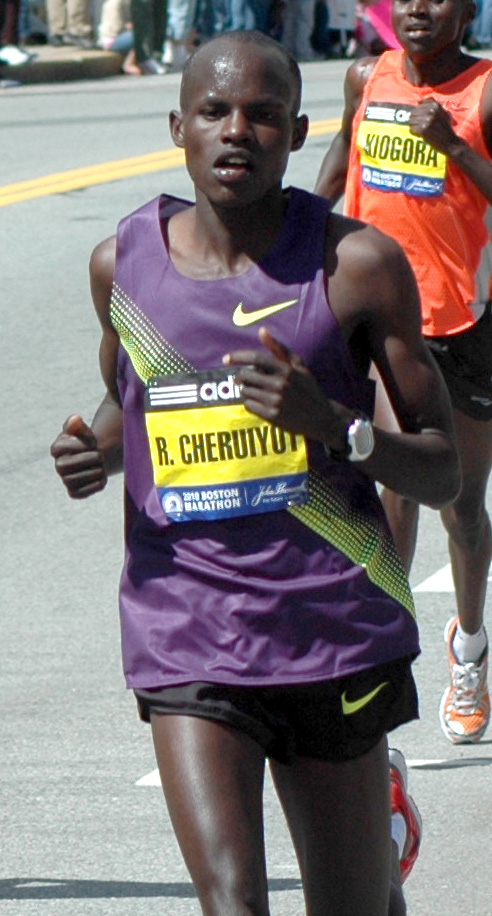
Robert Kiprono Cheruiyot during the race

The 2010 Boston Marathon was the 114th running of the annual marathon race in Boston, United States and was held on April 19. The elite men's race was won by Kenya's Robert Kiprono Cheruiyot in a time of 2:05:52 hours and the women's race was won by Ethiopia's Teyba Erkesso in 2:26:11.

== Results ==
=== Men ===
Position	Athlete	Nationality	Time
1	Robert Kiprono Cheruiyot	Kenya	2:05:52
2	Kebede Tekeste	Ethiopia	2:07:23
3	Deriba Merga	Ethiopia	2:08:39
4	Ryan Hall	United States	2:08:41
5	Meb Keflezighi	United States	2:09:26
6	Gashaw Asfaw	Ethiopia	2:10:53
7	John Kipkorir Komen	Kenya	2:11:48
8	Moses Kipkosgei Kigen	Kenya	2:12:04
9	Jason Lehmkuhle	United States	2:12:24
10	Alejandro Suárez	Mexico	2:12:33

=== Women ===
Position	Athlete	Nationality	Time
1	Teyba Erkesso	Ethiopia	2:26:11
2	Tatyana Pushkareva	Russia	2:26:14
3	Salina Kosgei	Kenya	2:28:35
4	Woynishet Girma	Ethiopia	2:28:36
5	Bruna Genovese	Italy	2:29:12
6	Lidiya Grigoryeva	Russia	2:30:31
7	Yurika Nakamura	Japan	2:30:40
8	Sun Weiwei	China	2:31:14
DQ 9	Nailiya Yulamanova	Russia	2:31:48
10	Albina Mayorova	Russia	2:31:55

Note: Nailiya Yulamanova's results were nullified for doping offences as of 20 August 2009.
