= 2009 Berlin Marathon =

German marathon

36th Berlin Marathon
- Venue: Berlin, Germany
- Dates: 20 September 2009

Champions
- Men: Haile Gebrselassie (2:06:08)
- Women: Atsede Habtamu (2:24:47)

The 2009 Berlin Marathon was the 36th edition of the Berlin Marathon. The marathon took place in Berlin, Germany, on 20 September 2009 and was the fourth World Marathon Majors race of the year.

The men's race was won by Haile Gebrselassie in 2:06:08 hours and the women's race was won by Atsede Habtamu in a time of 2:24:47 hours.

== Results ==
=== Men ===
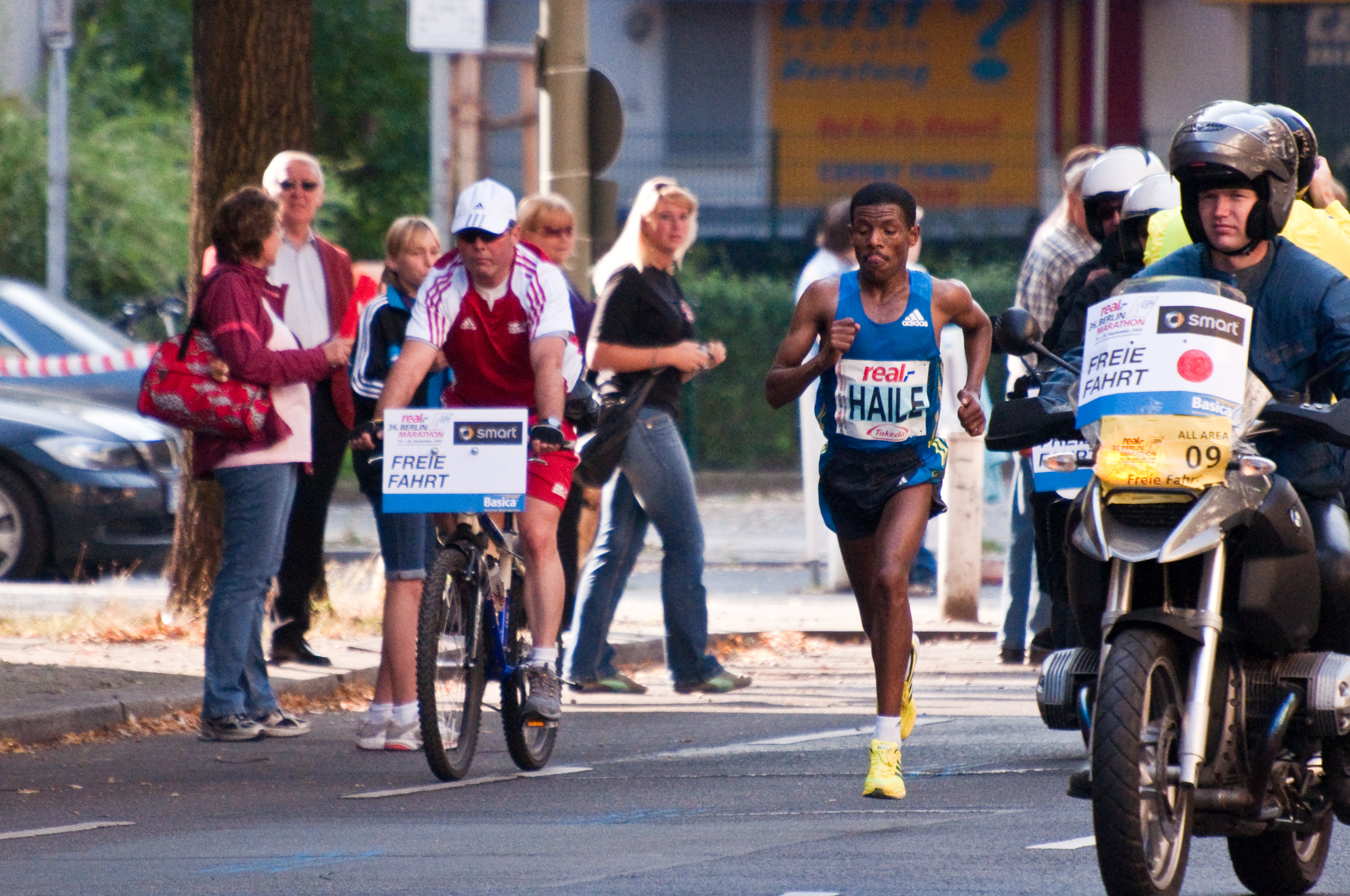
Haile Gebrselassie

Position	Athlete	Nationality	Time
1st place, gold medalist(s)	Haile Gebrselassie	Ethiopia	2:06:08
2nd place, silver medalist(s)	Francis Kiprop	Kenya	2:07:04
3rd place, bronze medalist(s)	Negari Terfa	Ethiopia	2:07:41
4	Dereje Debele Tulu	Ethiopia	2:09:41
5	Alfred Kering	Kenya	2:09:52
6	Girma Assefa	Ethiopia	2:09:58
7	Eshetu Wendimu	Ethiopia	2:12:28
8	Atsushi Fujita	Japan	2:12:54
9	Kensuke Takahashi	Japan	2:13:00
10	Cuthbert Nyasango	Zimbabwe	2:13:19

=== Women ===
Position	Athlete	Nationality	Time
1st place, gold medalist(s)	Atsede Habtamu	Ethiopia	2:24:47
2nd place, silver medalist(s)	Silviya Skvortsova	Russia	2:26:24
3rd place, bronze medalist(s)	Mamitu Daska	Ethiopia	2:26:38
4	Rosaria Console	Italy	2:26:45
5	Genet Getaneh	Ethiopia	2:27:09
6	Leah Jemeli Malot	Kenya	2:29:17
7	Tatyana Aryasova	Russia	2:32:17
8	Jacqueline Nytepi Kiplimo	Kenya	2:34:16
9	Maja Neuenschwander	Switzerland	2:35:44
10	Hayley Haining	United Kingdom	2:36:08
