= 2007 Boston Marathon =

Footrace in Boston, Massachusetts, USA

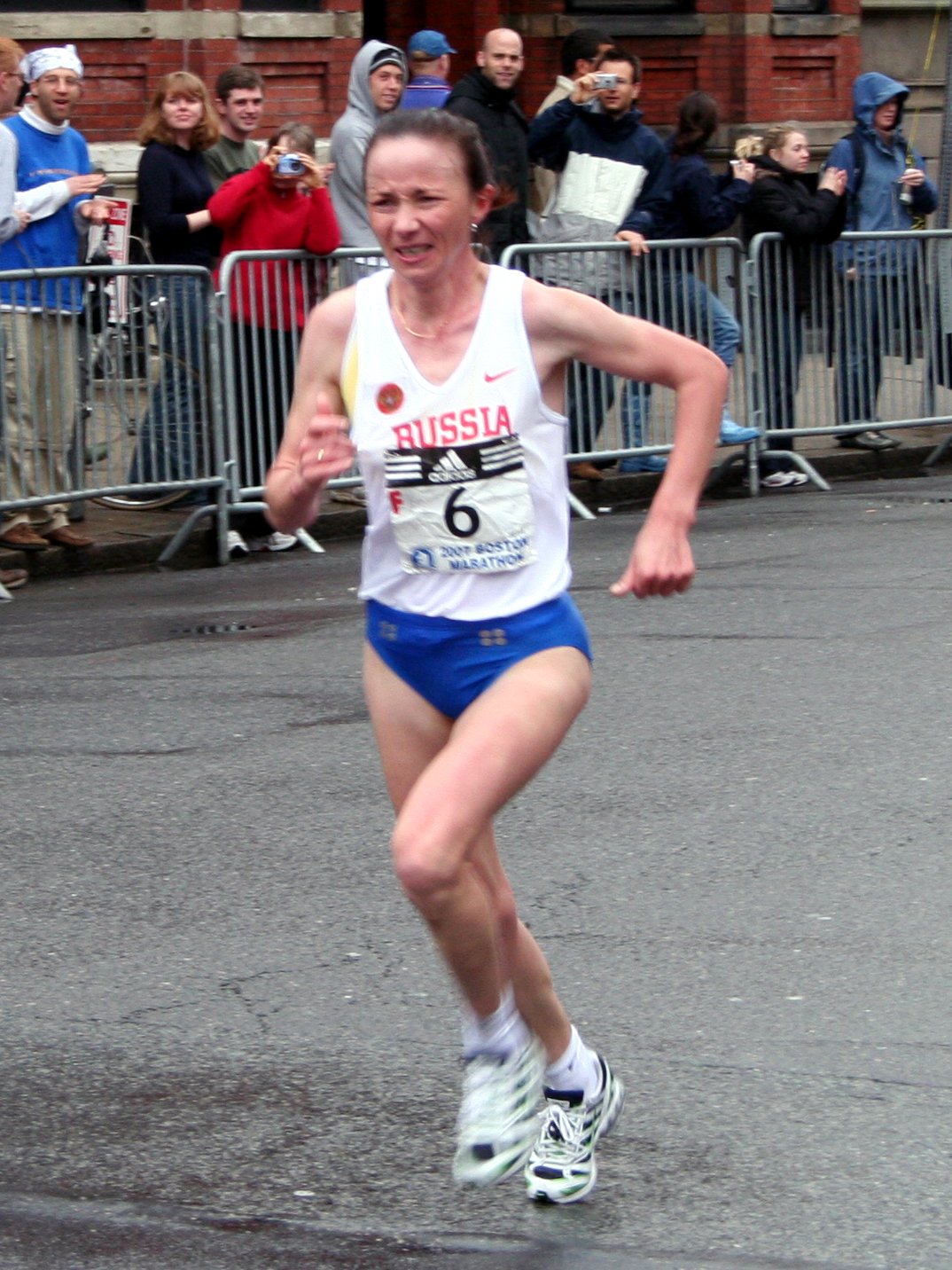
- Lidiya Grigoryeva during the race
- Venue: Boston, United States
- Dates: April 16

Champions
- Men: Robert Kipkoech Cheruiyot (2:14:13)
- Women: Lidiya Grigoryeva (2:29:18)

The 2007 Boston Marathon was the 111th running of the annual marathon race in Boston, United States and was held on April 16. The elite men's race was won by Kenya's Robert Kipkoech Cheruiyot in a time of 2:14:13 hours and the women's race was won by Russia's Lidiya Grigoryeva in 2:29:18.

== Results ==
=== Men ===
Position	Athlete	Nationality	Time
1	Robert Kipkoech Cheruiyot	Kenya	2:14:13
2	James Kwambai	Kenya	2:14:33
3	Stephen Kiogora	Kenya	2:14:47
4	Avero Washington	Uruguay	2:15:05
5	Tereje Wodajo	Ethiopia	2:15:06
6	Benjamin Maiyo	Kenya	2:16:04
7	Ruggero Pertile	Italy	2:16:08
8	Peter Gilmore	United States	2:16:41
9	Samuel Ndereba	Kenya	2:17:04
10	Robert Cheboror	Kenya	2:18:07

=== Women ===
Position	Athlete	Nationality	Time
1	Lidiya Grigoryeva	Russia	2:29:18
2	Jeļena Prokopčuka	Latvia	2:29:58
3	Madaí Pérez	Mexico	2:30:16
4	Rita Jeptoo	Kenya	2:33:08
5	Deena Kastor	United States	2:35:09
6	Robe Guta	Ethiopia	2:36:29
7	Alice Chelangat	Kenya	2:38:07
8	Ann Alyanak	United States	2:38:55
9	Kristin Price	United States	2:38:57
10	Mary Akor	United States	2:41:01
—	Lyubov Denisova	Russia	2:38:00 DQ
