= Robert Cheruiyot =

Robert Cheruiyot may refer to:

- Robert Kipkoech Cheruiyot (born 1978), Kenyan marathon runner, four-time winner of the Boston Marathon
- Robert Kiprono Cheruiyot (born 1988), Kenyan marathon runner, winner of the Boston Marathon 2010
