= Stephen Kiogora =

Kenyan long-distance runner

Medal record

Men's athletics

Representing Kenya

African Championships
Gold medal – first place	1996 Yaoundé	10,000 m

Stephen "Baba" Kiogora (born 10 November 1976) is a Kenyan former long-distance runner who competed in marathon races. His personal best for the distance is 2:08:24 hours (set in 2008). He has had top three finishes at the Boston Marathon, New York City Marathon and Frankfurt Marathon. The sole marathon win of his career came at the Las Vegas Marathon in 2005. He was the 1996 African champion over 10,000 metres.

== Biography ==
Born in the city of Meru, Kenya, Kiogora initially began his career as a long-distance track specialist and had his first success at the 1996 African Championships in Athletics, where he won the gold medal over 10,000 metres. He then became a half marathon runner and won the Kyiv Half Marathon and the Kenyan Armed Forces Half Marathon in 2000. He was the runner-up at the 1999 Paris Half Marathon in a time of 1:01:37 hours, finishing a fraction of a second behind the winner Phaustin Baha Sulle. He returned to the same race the following year and set his career best time of 1:01:09 hours, coming third on that occasion.

Kiogora's debut over the marathon distance came at the 2003 Cologne Marathon and he took third place behind Benjamin Rotich with a time of 2:12:29. He entered the 2004 Boston Marathon, his first World Marathon Major event, as a pacemaker for his training partner Timothy Cherigat. Kiogora completed his pacing duties, helping Cherigat to victory, and also managed to finish the race, taking fourth position. An appearance at the Chicago Marathon followed later that year and he recorded his first sub-2:10 run, coming in seventh place in 2:09:21 hours. In 2005 he continued to compete in the United States, being based in Boulder, Colorado with his coach Dieter Hogen's KIMbia Athletics group, and after a runner-up placing at the San Diego Marathon he went on to win his first race over the distance, topping the podium at the Las Vegas Marathon with a run of 2:11:58 hours.

Kiogora returned to San Diego in 2006 and had a consecutive podium finish, ending the race in third place. The New York City Marathon that year saw him attain his highest ever placing at a major marathon, as he came second only to Brazil's Marilson Gomes dos Santos. The year after he was third at Boston, but managed only seventh place upon his return to New York. Kiogora achieved a career best time of 2:08:24 hours at the Frankfurt Marathon in 2008 and this brought him third place behind fellow Kenyans Robert Kiprono Cheruiyot and Wilson Kigen. He made the top ten at the 2009 Boston Marathon (ninth in 2:13:00 hours), but fell down the order at the race the following year, ending up in thirteenth place. He sustained an injury in January 2011 and was set to be one of favourites for the Düsseldorf Marathon in May, but did not compete.
