= 2017 Tokyo Marathon =

Marathon race in 2017

11th Tokyo Marathon
- Venue: Tokyo, Japan
- Dates: 26 February

Champions
- Men: Wilson Kipsang (2:03:58)
- Women: Sarah Chepchirchir (2:19:47)

The 2017 Tokyo Marathon (Japanese: 東京マラソン 2017) was the eleventh edition of the annual marathon race in Tokyo, Japan and was held on Sunday, 26 February. An IAAF Gold Label Road Race, it was the first World Marathon Majors event to be held that year. The men's race was won by Wilson Kipsang in a New Course Record of 2:03:58. The women's race was won by Sarah Chepchirchir.

== Results ==
Official results English

=== Men ===
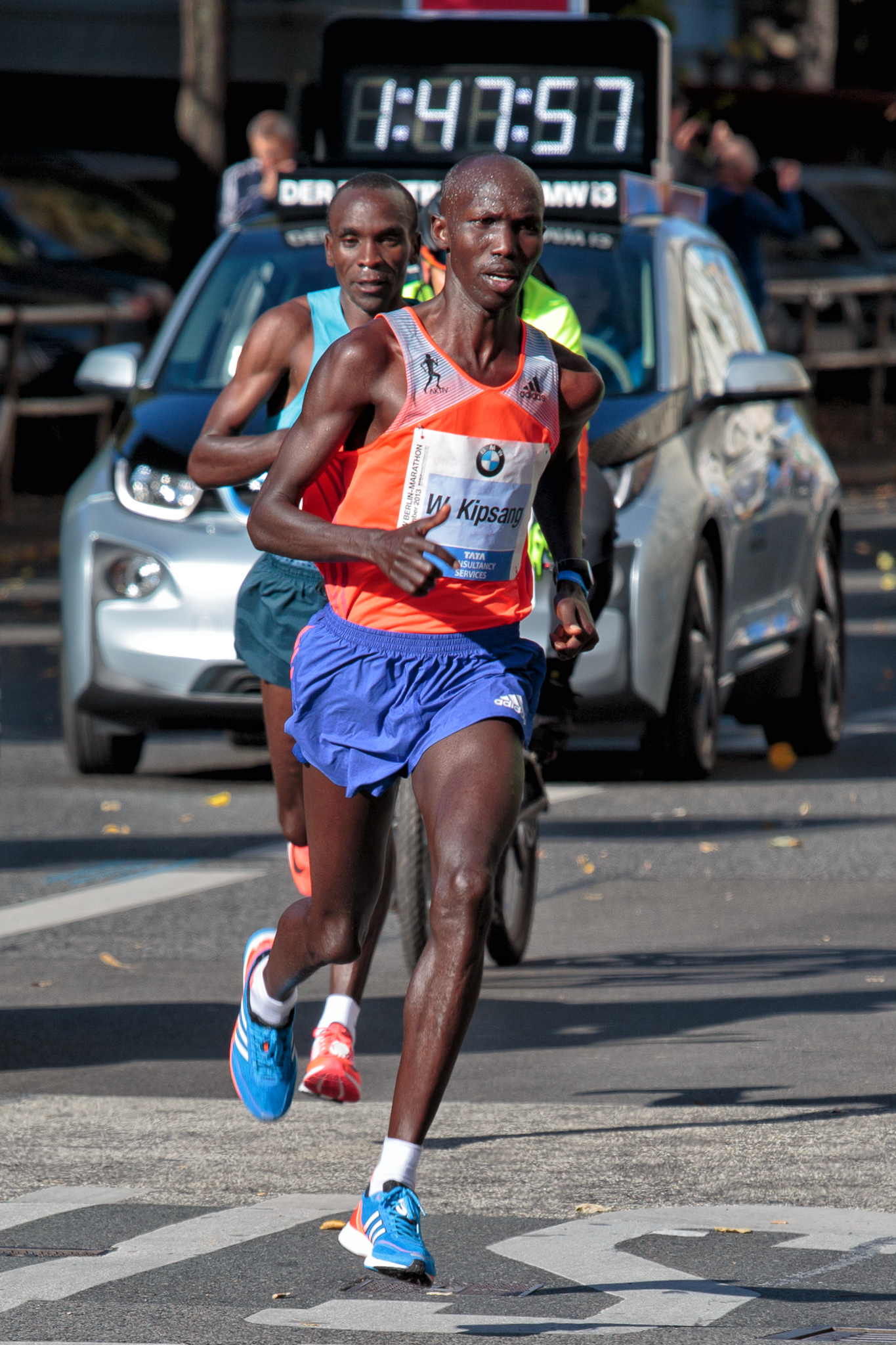
Wilson Kipsang

Position	Athlete	Nationality	Time
1st place, gold medalist(s)	Wilson Kipsang	Kenya	2:03:58
2nd place, silver medalist(s)	Gideon Kipketer	Kenya	2:05:51
3rd place, bronze medalist(s)	Dickson Chumba	Kenya	2:06:25
4	Evans Chebet	Kenya	2:06:42
5	Alfers Lagat	Kenya	2:07:39
6	Bernard Kipyego	Kenya	2:08:10
7	Yohanes Ghebregergis	Eritrea	2:08:14
8	Hiroto Inoue	Japan	2:08:22
9	Tsegaye Kebede	Ethiopia	2:08:45
10	Hiroyuki Yamamoto	Japan	2:09:12

=== Women ===
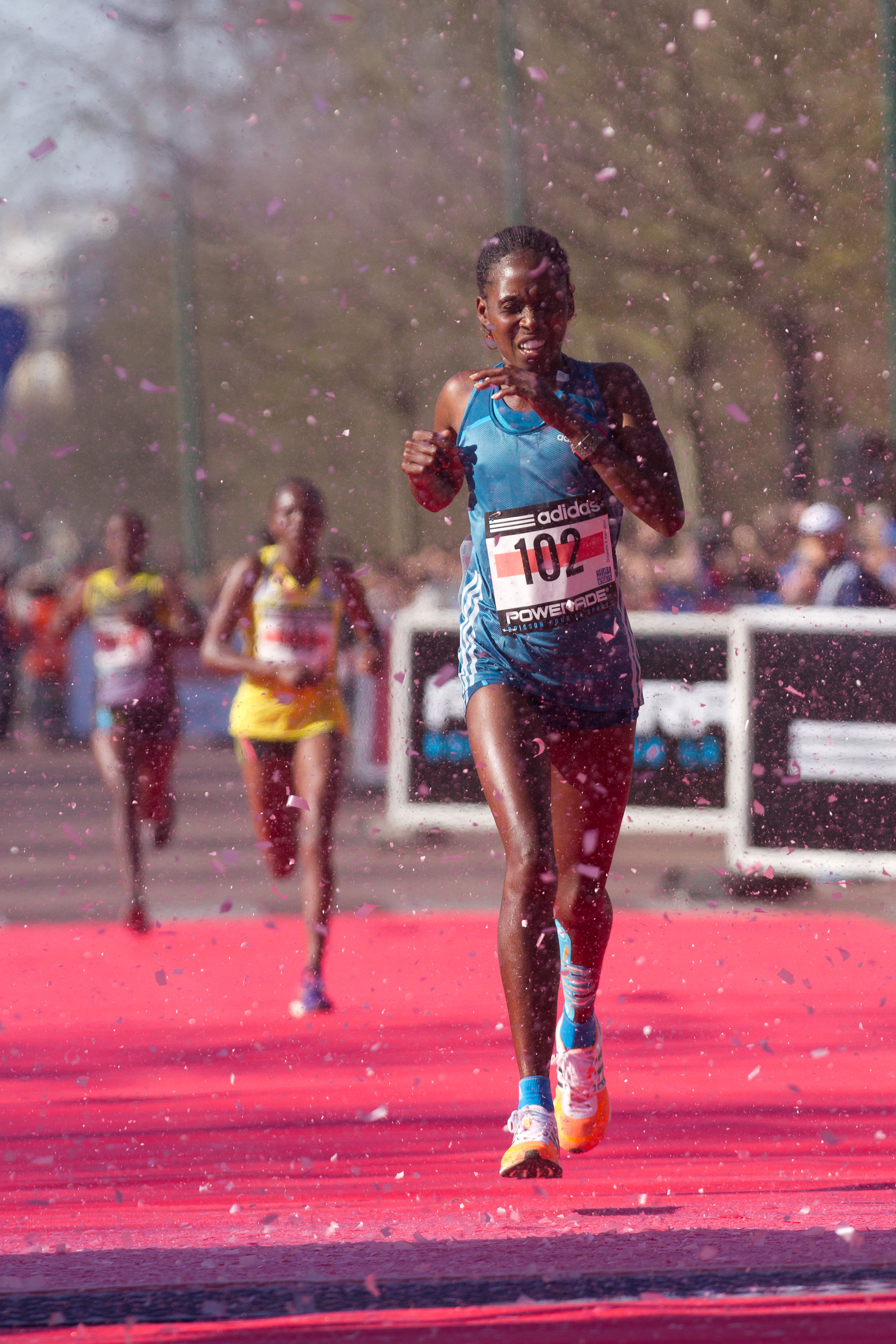
Sarah Chepchirchir

Position	Athlete	Nationality	Time
1st place, gold medalist(s)	Sarah Chepchirchir	Kenya	2:19:47
2nd place, silver medalist(s)	Birhane Dibaba	Ethiopia	2:21:19
3rd place, bronze medalist(s)	Amane Gobena	Ethiopia	2:23:09
4	Ayaka Fujimoto	Japan	2:27:08
5	Marta Lema	Ethiopia	2:27:37
6	Sara Hall	United States	2:28:26
7	Madoka Nakano	Japan	2:33:00
8	Kotomi Takayama	Japan	2:34:44
9	Hiroko Yoshimoto	Japan	2:35:11
10	Mitsuko Ino	Japan	2:39:33
