= 2008 Boston Marathon =

Footrace in Boston, Massachusetts, USA

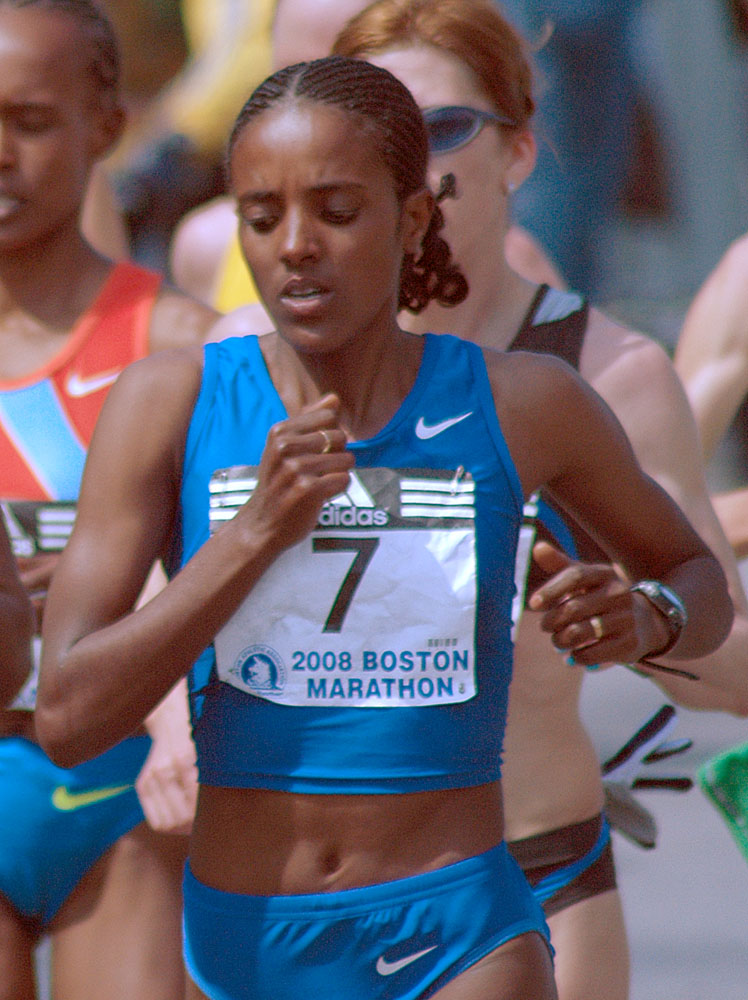
- Dire Tune during the race
- Venue: Boston, United States
- Dates: April 21

Champions
- Men: Robert Kipkoech Cheruiyot (2:07:46)
- Women: Dire Tune (2:25:25)

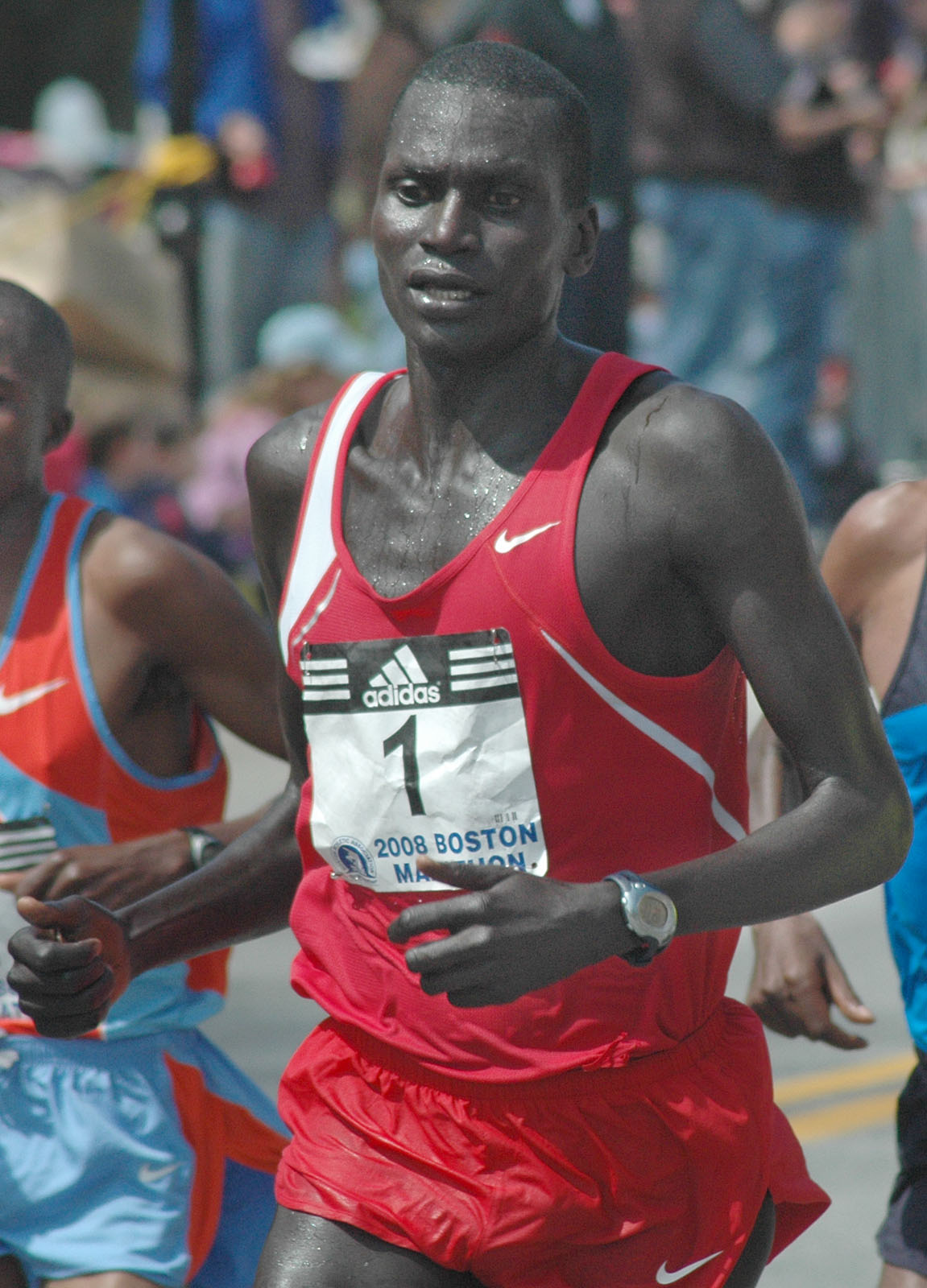
Robert Cheruiyot during the race

The 2008 Boston Marathon was the 112th running of the annual marathon race in Boston, United States and was held on April 21. The elite men's race was won by Kenya's Robert Kipkoech Cheruiyot in a time of 2:07:46 hours and the women's race was won by Ethiopia's Dire Tune in 2:25:25.

== Results ==
=== Men ===
| Position | Athlete | Nationality | Time |
|---|---|---|---|
| 1 | Robert Kipkoech Cheruiyot | Kenya | 2:07:46 |
| 2 | Abderrahime Bouramdane | Morocco | 2:09:04 |
| 3 | Khalid El-Boumlili | Morocco | 2:10:35 |
| 4 | Gashaw Asfaw | Ethiopia | 2:10:47 |
| 5 | Kasime Adilo Roba | Ethiopia | 2:12:24 |
| 6 | Timothy Cherigat | Kenya | 2:14:13 |
| 7 | Christopher Cheboiboch | Kenya | 2:14:47 |
| 8 | James Kwambai | Kenya | 2:16:07 |
| 9 | James Koskei | Kenya | 2:16:07 |
| 10 | Nicholas Arciniaga | United States | 2:16:13 |

=== Women ===
| Position | Athlete | Nationality | Time |
|---|---|---|---|
| 1 | Dire Tune | Ethiopia | 2:25:25 |
| 2 | Alevtina Biktimirova | Russia | 2:25:27 |
| 3 | Rita Jeptoo | Kenya | 2:26:34 |
| 4 | Jeļena Prokopčuka | Latvia | 2:28:12 |
| 5 | Askale Tafa | Ethiopia | 2:29:48 |
| 6 | Bruna Genovese | Italy | 2:30:52 |
| 7 | Nuța Olaru | Romania | 2:33:56 |
| 8 | Robe Guta | Ethiopia | 2:34:37 |
| 9 | Lidiya Grigoryeva | Russia | 2:35:37 |
| 10 | Stephanie Hood | United States | 2:44:44 |
