= 2008 Chicago Marathon =

Footrace held in Chicago, Illinois

31st Chicago Marathon
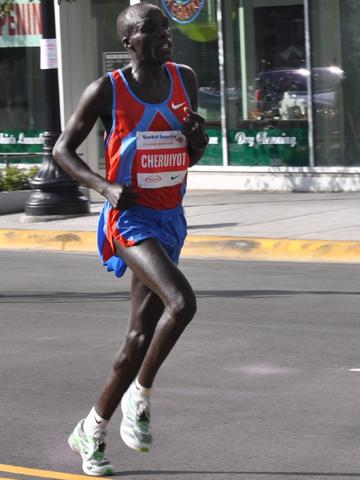
- Men's winner Cheruiyot at the race
- Venue: Chicago, United States
- Dates: October 12

Champions
- Men: Evans Cheruiyot (2:06:25)
- Women: Lidiya Grigoryeva (2:27:17)

The 2008 Chicago Marathon was the 31st running of the annual marathon race in Chicago, United States and was held on October 12. The elite men's race was won by Kenya's Evans Cheruiyot in a time of 2:06:25 hours and the women's race was won by Russia's Lidiya Grigoryeva in 2:27:17.

== Results ==
=== Men ===
Position	Athlete	Nationality	Time
1	Evans Cheruiyot	Kenya	2:06:25
2	David Mandago Kipkorir	Kenya	2:07:37
3	Timothy Cherigat	Kenya	2:11:39
4	Wesley Korir	Kenya	2:13:53
5	Martin Lauret	Netherlands	2:15:10
6	Emmanuel Kipchirchir Mutai	Kenya	2:15:36
7	Mike Reneau	United States	2:16:20
8	William Kipsang	Kenya	2:16:41
9	Daniel Njenga	Kenya	2:17:33
10	Richard Limo	Kenya	2:18:48

=== Women ===
Position	Athlete	Nationality	Time
1	Lidiya Grigoryeva	Russia	2:27:17
2	Alevtina Biktimirova	Russia	2:29:32
3	Kiyoko Shimahara	Japan	2:30:19
4	Constantina Diță	Romania	2:30:57
5	Desiree Davila	United States	2:31:33
6	Colleen De Reuck	United States	2:32:25
7	Bezunesh Bekele	Ethiopia	2:32:41
8	Paige Higgins	United States	2:33:06
9	Kate O'Neill	United States	2:34:04
10	Berhane Adere	Ethiopia	2:34:16
