= Dickson Chumba =

Kenyan long-distance runner

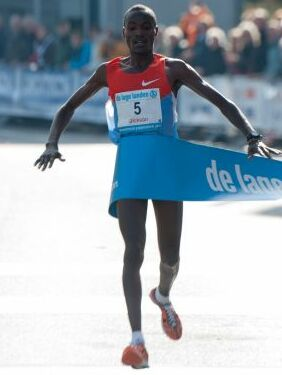
Dickson Chumba

Dickson Kiptolo Chumba (born 27 October 1986) is a Kenyan long-distance runner who competes in marathon races. He has won the Rome, Eindhoven, Tokyo, and Chicago marathons and has a personal best of 2:04:32 for the distance.

== Career ==
Born in Kenya's Nandi District, Chumba worked as a gardener until he decided to focus on running professionally. He began working with Claudio Berardelli in Kapsabet in 2008. His first marathon outings came in 2010 and he was runner-up at both the Madrid Marathon and the Italian Marathon. His first win came in March 2011 when he ran a personal best of 2:08:45 to claim the Rome City Marathon title ahead of defending champion Siraj Gena. He was faster still at the Frankfurt Marathon in October, running 2:07:23, although the close to world record pace meant he finished seventh.

At the start of 2012 he had his third career runner-up finish at the Xiamen Marathon, having gradually fallen away from the winner Peter Kamais. Victory came at the Eindhoven Marathon as he surged away in the second half of the race. Although he struggled in the final two kilometres he won by a margin of half a minute and set a new course record (and personal best) of 2:05:46.

He started the 2013 Xiamen race quickly, but dropped out after an ill-timed surge to the front. He placed seventh at the 2013 Boston Marathon and then came eighth at the Amsterdam Marathon in October.

He won the 2014 Tokyo Marathon in 2:05:42, improving the course record by more than a minute.

In October 2015 he won the 2015 Chicago Marathon in 2:09:25, pulling away at 30 K in a World Marathon Majors race conducted without pacemakers.

In 2018 he won the Tokyo Marathon for the second time in 2:05:30, improving his personal best time for the distance.

== Achievements ==
=== World Marathon Majors results timeline ===
| World Marathon Majors | 2013 | 2014 | 2015 | 2016 | 2017 | 2018 |
|---|---|---|---|---|---|---|
| Tokyo Marathon | - | 1st | 3rd | 3rd | 3rd | 1st |
| Boston Marathon | 7th | - | - | - | - | |
| London Marathon | - | - | - | - | - | |
| Berlin Marathon | - | - | - | - | - | |
| Chicago Marathon | - | 3rd | 1st | 2nd | - | |
| New York City Marathon | - | - | - | - | - | |
