= Yuki Takamiya =

Japanese long-distance runner

Yuki Takamiya (高宮 祐樹, Takamiya Yūki; born December 2, 1987) is a Japanese long-distance runner.

== University career ==
Takamiya twice competed at the Hakone Ekiden for Josai University.

== 2016 season ==
Takamiya finished 8th at the 2016 Tokyo Marathon, the highest finish for a male Japanese runner. This placed him, along with Satoru Sasaki, in consideration for an Olympic spot.
