= Mike Sayenko =

American long-distance runner

Mike Sayenko (born 12 July 1984) is an American long distance runner specializing in the marathon. He competed in the men's marathon at the 2011 World Championships in Athletics.

He finished tenth at the 2010 Chicago Marathon.
