= 2011 Boston Marathon =

Footrace in Boston, Massachusetts, USA

- Venue: Boston, Massachusetts
- Dates: April 18

Champions
- Men: Geoffrey Mutai (2:03:02)
- Women: Caroline Kilel (2:22:36)
- Wheelchair men: Masazumi Soejima (1:18:50)
- Wheelchair women: Wakako Tsuchida (1:34:06)

The 2011 Boston Marathon took place on Monday, April 18, 2011, as the 115th official running of the Boston Marathon. On October 18, 2010, the 20,000 spots reserved for qualifiers were filled in a record-setting eight hours and three minutes. Geoffrey Mutai of Kenya won the men's race in a time of 2:03:02.

== Background ==
In December 2010, Tom Grik, the President of the Boston Athletic Association's Board of Governors, said that the BAA would focus on recruiting top Americans to the marathon. In February 2011, Meb Keflezighi, the 2009 winner of the New York City Marathon and considered along with Ryan Hall to be one of the two most prominent American marathoners, announced through his website that race organizers had failed to make an appearance fee offer to him and that he would not be participating in the race.

== Mutai record ==
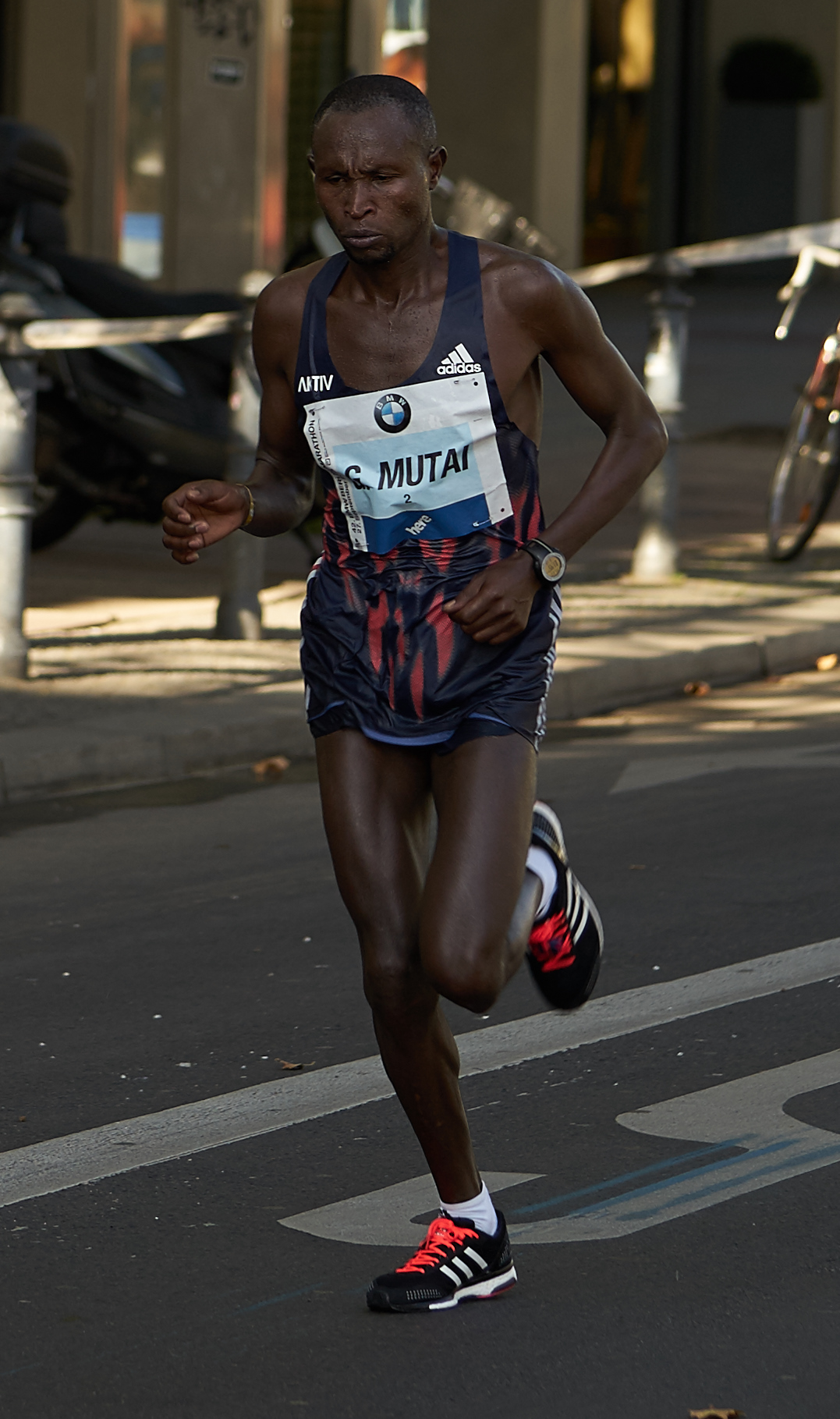
Geoffrey Mutai

In recognizing Geoffrey Mutai's winning time of 2:03:02 as the "fastest Marathon ever run", the International Association of Athletics Federations noted that the performance was not eligible for world record status given that the course does not satisfy rules regarding elevation drop (it has "more than three times the elevation drop permitted for record-setting") and start/finish separation. The Associated Press (AP) reported that Mutai had the support of other runners who describe the IAAF's rules as "flawed". According to the Boston Herald, race director Dave McGillivray said he was sending paperwork to the IAAF to have Mutai's mark ratified as a world record. The AP also indicated that the attempt to have the mark certified as a world record "would force the governing bodies to reject an unprecedented performance on the world's most prestigious marathon course".

== Results ==
=== Elite races ===
Elite Men
Place	Athlete	Nationality	Time
Gold medal	Geoffrey Mutai	Kenya	2:03:02
Silver medal	Moses Mosop	Kenya	2:03:06
Bronze medal	Gebregziabher Gebremariam	Ethiopia	2:04:53
4	Ryan Hall	United States	2:04:58
5	Abreham Cherkos	Ethiopia	2:06:13
6	Robert Kiprono Cheruiyot	Kenya	2:06:43
7	Philip Kimutai Sanga	Kenya	2:07:10
8	Deressa Chimsa	Ethiopia	2:07:39
9	Bekana Daba	Ethiopia	2:08:03
10	Robert Kipchumba	Kenya	2:08:44

Elite Women
Place	Athlete	Nationality	Time
Gold medal	Caroline Kilel	Kenya	2:22:36
Silver medal	Desiree Davila	United States	2:22:38
Bronze medal	Sharon Cherop	Kenya	2:22:42
4	Caroline Rotich	Kenya	2:24:26
5	Kara Goucher	United States	2:24:52
6	Dire Tune	Ethiopia	2:25:08
7	Werknesh Kidane	Ethiopia	2:26:15
8	Yolanda Caballero	Colombia	2:26:17
9	Alice Timbilili	Kenya	2:26:34
10	Yuliya Ruban	Ukraine	2:27:00

=== Wheelchair races ===
Men
Place	Athlete	Nationality	Time
Gold medal	Masazumi Soejima	Japan	1:18:50
Silver medal	Kurt Fearnley	Australia	1:18:51
Bronze medal	Ernst Van Dyk	South Africa	1:18:51

Women
Place	Athlete	Nationality	Time
Gold medal	Wakako Tsuchida	Japan	1:34:06
Silver medal	Shirley Reilly	United States	1:41:01
Bronze medal	Christina Ripp	United States	1:41:02
