= Maja Neuenschwander =

Swiss long-distance runner

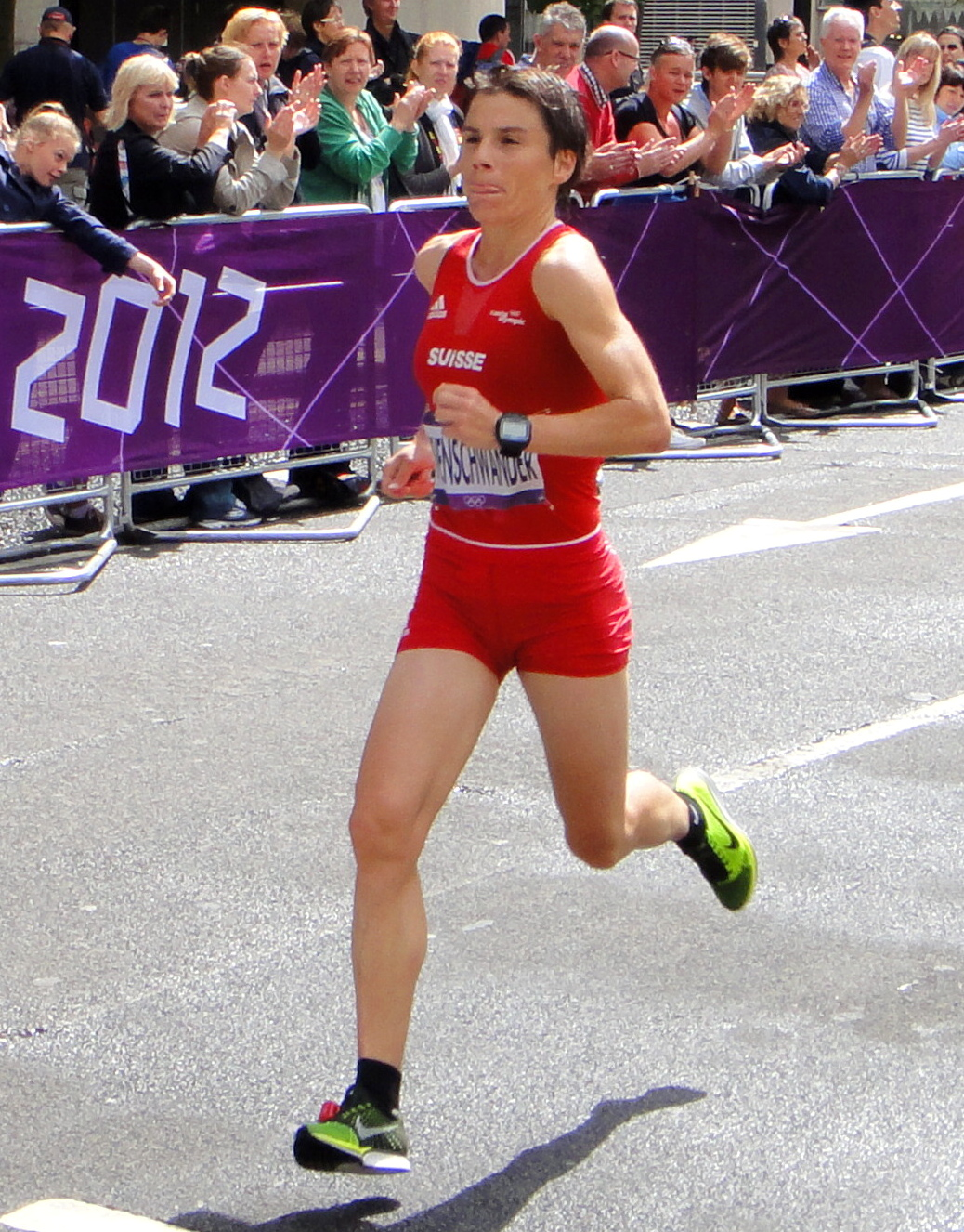

Personal information
- Born: February 13, 1980 (age 46) Bern, BE
- Height: 1.68 m (5 ft 6 in)
- Weight: 55 kg (121 lb)

Sport
- Country: Switzerland
- Sport: Athletics
- Events: Marathon; 10,000 m half marathon
- Updated on 5 August 2012

Maja Neuenschwander (born 13 February 1980 in Bern, Canton of Bern) is a Swiss long-distance runner who competes in marathon races. Her personal best for the marathon distance is 2:30:09 hours – run at the 2015 Vienna Marathon where she was the first female runner overall (the first Swiss victory in history).

She has represented her country in the marathon at the European Athletics Championships (2010) and the Summer Olympics (2012).

== Career ==
Her first international outing came at the European Cross Country Championships, where she ran in the junior race and placed 16th in 1998 and 30th in 1999. She was a 5000 metres finalist at the 1999 European Athletics Junior Championships, finishing seventh.

She made her half marathon debut in Uster in 2000 and came fifth with a time of 76:26 minutes. Despite this early start, she did not compete in top level athletics for several years after this. She returned to action in 2006 with a new focus on the marathon distance. She ran a best of 2:44:24 hours for third at the Zurich Marathon and came 13th at the Berlin Marathon. She had similar results the following year, placing fourth in Zurich and 15th in Berlin. In 2008, she ran under two hours and forty minutes for the first time at the Berlin Marathon, crossing the line after 2:38:53 hours to take twelfth place. She had marked improvement in 2009, setting personal bests of 76:22 minutes at the Paris Half Marathon and 2:35:44 at the 2009 Berlin Marathon.

These performances brought Neuenschwander her first senior international appearances: she came 25th in the marathon at the 2010 European Athletics Championships and she competed at the 2012 Summer Olympics in the marathon where she finished in 53rd place. In the meantime she had brought her best down to 2:33:45 at the 2011 Berlin Marathon then 2:31:56 to take the runner-up spot at the Zurich Marathon.

The start of the 2013 brought Neuenschwander a personal best of 2:30:50 with which she was the runner-up at the Hamburg Marathon.

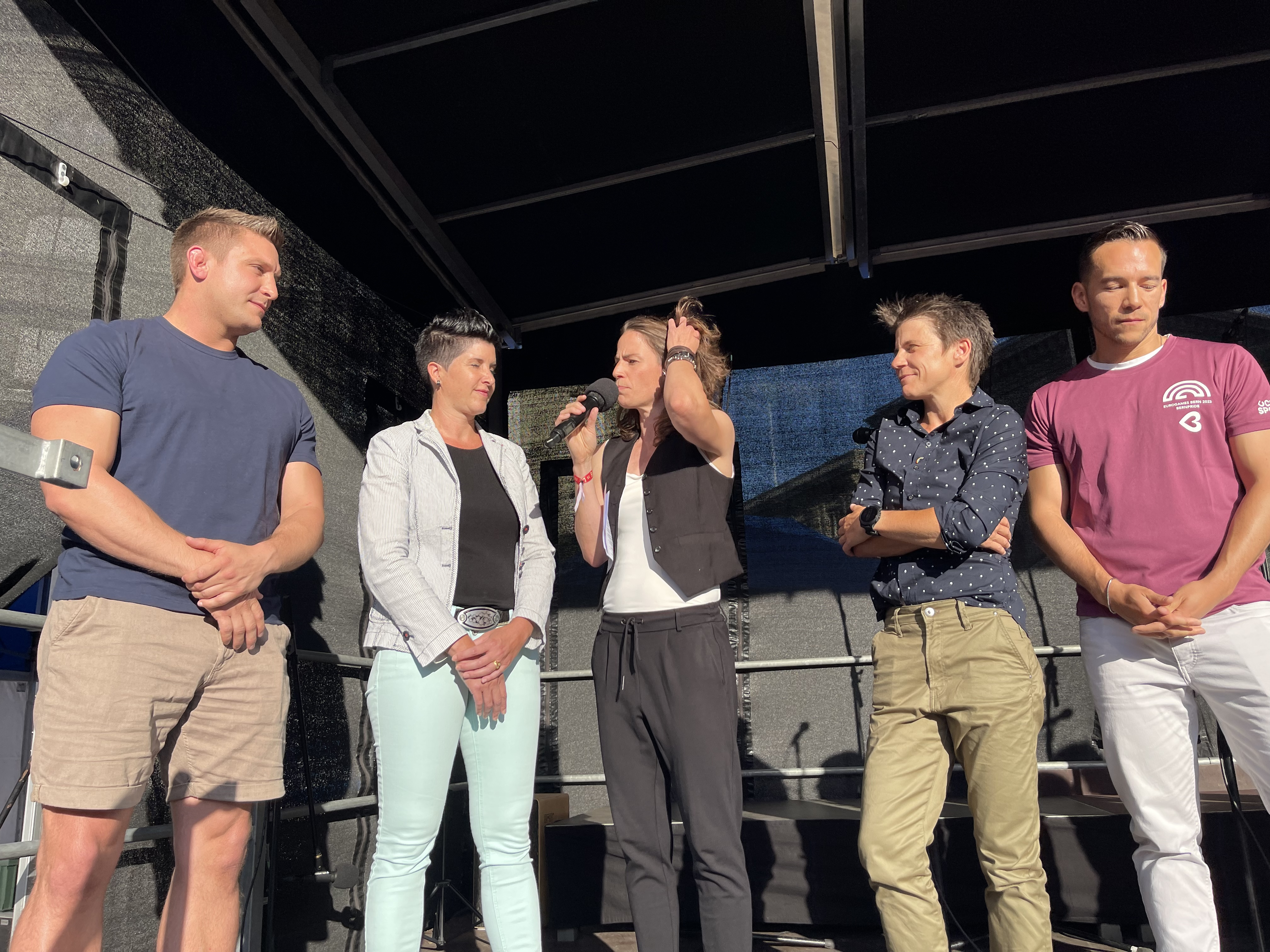
Maja Neuenschwander at Eurogames Bern 2023 opening ceremony (second from the right)

In 2023 she was an ambassador for the EuroGames in Bern.

== Personal bests ==
- 10,000 metres: 35:49.89 min (1999)
- Half-marathon: 1:11:08 hours (2015)
- Marathon: 2:26:49 hours (2015) NR

== Results ==
Year	Competition	Venue	Position	Notes
2001	European Cross Country Championships	Thun, Switzerland	69th	Cross country
2010	European Championships	Barcelona, Spain	25th	Marathon
2012	Olympic Games	London, United Kingdom	53rd	Marathon
2013	Hamburg Marathon	Hamburg, Germany	2nd	Marathon
2014	European Championships	Zurich, Switzerland	9th	Marathon
2015	CPC Loop Den Haag	The Hague, Netherlands	1st	Half marathon
2015	Vienna Marathon	Vienna, Austria	1st	Marathon
2015	Berlin Marathon	Berlin, Germany	6th	Marathon
