= 2010 Chicago Marathon =

Footrace held in Chicago, Illinois

33rd Chicago Marathon
- Venue: Chicago, United States
- Dates: October 10

Champions
- Men: Samuel Wanjiru (2:06:24)
- Women: Atsede Baysa (2:23:40)

The 2010 Chicago Marathon was the 33rd running of the annual marathon race in Chicago, United States, held on Sunday, October 10. Over 38,000 runners took part, the most in the race's history.

Kenyan Samuel Wanjiru won the men's event with a time of 2:06:24, beating Ethiopian Tsegaye Kebede by 19 seconds. Ethiopian Atsede Baysa won the women's event with a time of 2:23:40, beating Desiree Davlia by two minutes and forty seconds. On race day, Liliya Shobukhova crossed the finish line first in 2:20:25 more than 3 minutes ahead of Baysa but Shobukhova would eventually lose the title due to an anti-doping suspension. Wanjiru's win likely clinched him the men's championship, but Kebede could still take it if he wins or places second in the New York Marathon; this is considered unlikely since it is only four weeks from the Chicago Marathon. Heinz Frei of Switzerland won the men's wheelchair event in 1:26:56 and American Amanda McGrory won the women's in 1:47:25.

Richard Whitehead of Great Britain broke his old world record for athletes with lower-limb amputations, with a time of 2:42:52.

Over six months before the race, organizers moved up the race's start-time by half an hour to 7:30 am to help prevent heat-related injuries like those that occurred in the 2007 when more than 300 runners were hospitalized. A red-flag warning was issued during the race, and sixty-five people were hospitalized, which is in line with other marathons. Despite the conditions, over 36,000 runners finished the 42.195-kilometer (26.219 mi) race, the most in Chicago Marathon history.

== Results ==
=== Elite races ===
Elite Men

Place	Athlete	Nationality	Time
1	Samuel Wanjiru	Kenya	2:06:24
2	Tsegaye Kebede	Ethiopia	2:06:43
3	Feyisa Lilesa	Ethiopia	2:08:10
4	Wesley Korir	Kenya	2:08:44
5	Vincent Kipruto	Kenya	2:09:08
6	Robert Kiprono Cheruiyot	Kenya	2:09:28
7	Laban Moiben	Kenya	2:10:48
8	Jason Hartmann	United States	2:11:06
9	Ridouane Harroufi	Morocco	2:13:01
10	Mike Sayenko	United States	2:14:27

Elite Women

Place	Athlete	Nationality	Time
1	Atsede Baysa	Ethiopia	2:23:40
2	Desiree Davila	United States	2:26:20
3	Irina Mikitenko	Germany	2:26:40
4	Mamitu Daska	Ethiopia	2:28:29
5	Magdalena Lewy-Boulet	United States	2:28:44
6	Kaori Yoshida	Japan	2:29:45
7	Jia Chaofeng	China	2:30:35
8	Tera Moody	United States	2:30:53
9	Fiona Docherty	New Zealand	2:32:17
10	Askale Tafa	Ethiopia	2:32:24

=== Wheelchair races ===
Men

Place	Athlete	Nationality	Time
1	Heinz Frei	Switzerland	1:26:56
2	Masazumi Soejima	Japan	1:28:01
3	Rafael Botello Jimenez	Spain	1:28:46
4	Ernst van Dyk	South Africa	1:32:43
5	Saul Mendoza	Mexico	1:36:04
6	Aaron Pike	United States	1:36:04
7	Adam Bleakney	United States	1:36:06
8	Ryan Chalmers	United States	1:36:31
9	Josh George	United States	1:42:27
10	Tony Iniguez	United States	1:42:53

Women

Place	Athlete	Nationality	Time
1	Amanda McGrory	United States	1:47:25
2	Wakako Tsuchida	Japan	1:47:27
3	Tatyana McFadden	United States	1:56:11
4	Anjali Forber Pratt	United States	2:02:05
5	Margaret Frederick	United States	2:43:45
