= 2006 Boston Marathon =

Footrace in Boston, Massachusetts, USA

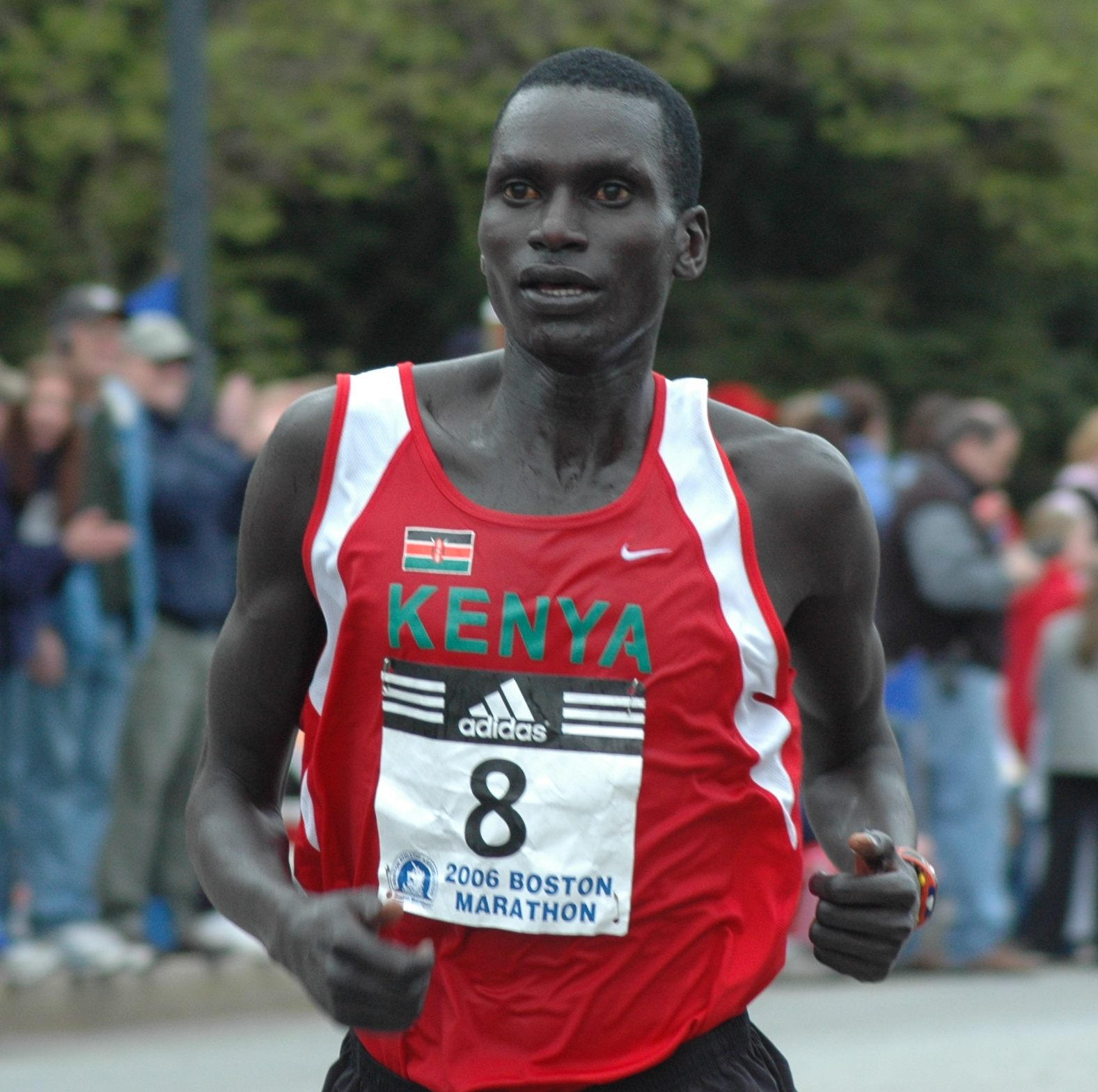
- Robert Kipkoech Cheruiyot during the race
- Venue: Boston, United States
- Dates: April 17

Champions
- Men: Robert Kipkoech Cheruiyot (2:07:14)
- Women: Rita Jeptoo (2:23:38)

The 2006 Boston Marathon was the 110th running of the annual marathon race in Boston, United States and was held on April 17. The elite men's race was won by Kenya's Robert Kipkoech Cheruiyot in a time of 2:07:14 hours and the women's race was won in 2:23:38 by Rita Jeptoo, also of Kenya.

== Results ==
=== Men ===
Position	Athlete	Nationality	Time
1	Robert Kipkoech Cheruiyot	Kenya	2:07:14
2	Benjamin Maiyo	Kenya	2:08:21
3	Meb Keflezighi	United States	2:09:56
4	Brian Sell	United States	2:10:55
5	Alan Culpepper	United States	2:11:05
6	Kenjiro Jitsui	Japan	2:11:32
7	Peter Gilmore	United States	2:12:45
8	William Kiplagat	Kenya	2:13:26
9	Wilson Onsare	Kenya	2:13:47
10	Clint Verran	United States	2:14:12

=== Women ===
Position	Athlete	Nationality	Time
1	Rita Jeptoo	Kenya	2:23:38
2	Jeļena Prokopčuka	Latvia	2:23:48
3	Reiko Tosa	Japan	2:24:11
4	Bruna Genovese	Italy	2:25:28
5	Kiyoko Shimahara	Japan	2:26:52
6	Alevtina Biktimirova	Russia	2:26:58
7	Olivera Jevtić	Serbia and Montenegro	2:29:38
8	Madina Biktagirova	Russia	2:30:06
9	Olesya Nurgalieva	Russia	2:30:16
10	Živilė Balčiūnaitė	Lithuania	2:32:16
