= 2006 Berlin Marathon =

Road running event in Berlin, Germany

33rd Berlin Marathon
- Venue: Berlin, Germany
- Dates: 24 September 2006

Champions
- Men: Haile Gebrselassie (2:05:56)
- Women: Gete Wami (2:21:34)

The 2006 Berlin Marathon was the 33rd edition of the Berlin Marathon. The marathon took place in Berlin, Germany, on 24 September 2006.

The men's race was won by Haile Gebrselassie in 2:05:56 hours and the women's race was won by Gete Wami in a time of 2:21:34 hours.

== Results ==
=== Men ===
Position	Athlete	Nationality	Time
1st place, gold medalist(s)	Haile Gebrselassie	Ethiopia	2:05:56
2nd place, silver medalist(s)	Gudisa Shentema	Ethiopia	2:10:43
3rd place, bronze medalist(s)	Kurao Umeki	Japan	2:13:43
4	Terefe Yae	Ethiopia	2:15:05
5	Ahmed Ezzobayry	France	2:15:29
6	Driss El Himer	France	2:16:44
7	Ombeche Mokamba	Kenya	2:17:34
8	Jackson Koech	Kenya	2:17:42
9	Abel Kirui	Kenya	2:17:47
10	Donatien Buzzinggo	Burkina Faso	2:19:25

=== Women ===
Position	Athlete	Nationality	Time
1st place, gold medalist(s)	Gete Wami	Ethiopia	2:21:34
2nd place, silver medalist(s)	Salina Kosgei	Kenya	2:23:22
3rd place, bronze medalist(s)	Monika Drybulska	Poland	2:30:12
4	Asha Gigi	Ethiopia	2:32:32
5	Márcia Narloch	Brazil	2:35:28
6	Melanie Kraus	Germany	2:35:37
7	Shitaye Gemechu	Ethiopia	2:35:56
8	Zekiros Adanech	Ethiopia	2:36:48
9	Mounia Aboulahcen	Belgium	2:38:55
10	Alem Ashebir	Ethiopia	2:41:27
