= 2009 New York City Marathon =

Footrace held in New York City

40th New York City Marathon
- Venue: New York City, New York
- Date: November 1

Champions
- Men: Meb Keflezighi (2:09:15)
- Women: Derartu Tulu (2:28:52)
- Wheelchair men: Kurt Fearnley (1:35:58)
- Wheelchair women: Edith Hunkeler (1:58:15)

The 2009 New York City Marathon was the 40th running of the annual marathon race in New York City, New York, which took place on Sunday, November 1. The men's elite race was won by home athlete Meb Keflezighi in a time of 2:09:15 hours while the women's race was won by Ethiopia's Derartu Tulu in 2:28:52.

In the wheelchair races, Australia's Kurt Fearnley (1:35:58) and Switzerland's Edith Hunkeler (1:58:15) won the men's and women's divisions, respectively. In the handcycle race, Americans Dane Pilon (1:19:48) and Helene Hines (1:53:51) were the winners.

A total of 43,250 runners finished the race, 28,178 men and 15,072 women.

== Results ==
=== Men ===
Position	Athlete	Nationality	Time
1st place, gold medalist(s)	Meb Keflezighi	United States	2:09:15
2nd place, silver medalist(s)	Robert Kipkoech Cheruiyot	Kenya	2:09:56
3rd place, bronze medalist(s)	Jaouad Gharib	Morocco	2:10:25
4	Ryan Hall	United States	2:10:36
5	Abderrahime Bouramdane	Morocco	2:12:14
6	Hendrick Ramaala	South Africa	2:12:30
7	Jorge Torres	United States	2:13:00
8	Nicholas Arciniaga	United States	2:13:46
9	Abdihakem Abdirahman	United States	2:14:00
10	Jason Lehmkuhle	United States	2:14:39
11	Jackson Kipkoech	Kenya	2:15:10
12	Peter Gilmore	United States	2:15:22
13	Migidio Bourifa	Italy	2:16:01
14	Mikhail Sayenko	United States	2:16:38
15	Michael Reneau	United States	2:16:45
16	Jose Telles	Brazil	2:17:28
17	Allen Wagner	United States	2:17:49
18	Max King	United States	2:19:11
19	Mohammed Awol	Ethiopia	2:19:31
20	Christopher Raabe	United States	2:19:49
—	Marílson Gomes dos Santos	Brazil	DNF
—	James Kwambai	Kenya	DNF
—	Patrick Makau Musyoki	Kenya	DNF
—	Bolota Asmerom	United States	DNF
—	Dan Browne	United States	DNF
—	Genna Tufa	Ethiopia	DNF
—	Celedonio Rodriguez	United States	DNF
—	Teklu Deneke	Ethiopia	DNF
—	Philippe Caine	United Kingdom	3:35:49

=== Women ===
Position	Athlete	Nationality	Time
1st place, gold medalist(s)	Derartu Tulu	Ethiopia	2:28:52
2nd place, silver medalist(s)	Lyudmila Petrova	Russia	2:29:00
3rd place, bronze medalist(s)	Christelle Daunay	France	2:29:16
4	Paula Radcliffe	United Kingdom	2:29:27
5	Salina Kosgei	Kenya	2:31:53
6	Magdalena Boulet	United States	2:32:17
7	Bizunesh Deba	Ethiopia	2:35:54
8	Serkalem Biset	Ethiopia	2:37:20
9	Yuri Kanō	Japan	2:39:05
10	Desiree Ficker	United States	2:39:30
11	Catharine Mullen	United States	2:43:13
12	Christine Ramsey	United States	2:44:37
13	Heidi Westover	United States	2:44:59
14	Sopagna Eap	United States	2:45:15
15	Hirut Mengistu	Ethiopia	2:47:03
16	Therese Hagersjo†	Sweden	2:49:02
17	Joan Samuelson†	United States	2:49:09
18	Lisa Hütthaler†	Austria	2:49:33
19	Michelle Cope	United Kingdom	2:49:48
20	Caroline Almon†	United States	2:51:47
—	Hirut Legesse	Ethiopia	DNF
—	Kim Fawke	United Kingdom	DNF
—	Katarina Janosiková	Slovakia	DNF
—	Viktoriya Ganushina	Ukraine	DNF
—	Meseret Kotu	Ethiopia	DNF

- † Ran in mass race

=== Wheelchair men ===
Position	Athlete	Nationality	Time
1st place, gold medalist(s)	Kurt Fearnley	Australia	1:35:58
2nd place, silver medalist(s)	Krige Schabort	South Africa	1:35:58
3rd place, bronze medalist(s)	Marcel Hug	Switzerland	1:40:43
4	Roger Puigbò	Spain	1:40:44
5	Saúl Mendoza	United States	1:40:46
6	Josh Cassidy	Canada	1:40:46
7	Rafael Botello	Spain	1:43:42
8	Masazumi Soejima	Japan	1:43:42
9	Ernst van Dyk	South Africa	1:44:20
10	Josh George	United States	1:44:22

=== Wheelchair women ===
Position	Athlete	Nationality	Time
1st place, gold medalist(s)	Edith Hunkeler	Switzerland	1:58:15
2nd place, silver medalist(s)	Shelly Woods	United Kingdom	1:58:22
3rd place, bronze medalist(s)	Wakako Tsuchida	Japan	1:58:23
4	Christie Dawes	Australia	1:58:37
5	Sandra Graf	Switzerland	2:04:42
6	Tatyana McFadden	United States	2:08:05
7	Shirley Reilly	United States	2:13:32
8	Sandra Hager	Switzerland	2:28:04
9	Iris Jimenez	United States	5:15:38
10	Clara Bailon	United States	5:27:12

=== Handcycle men ===
Position	Athlete	Nationality	Time
1st place, gold medalist(s)	Dane Pilon	United States	1:19:48
2nd place, silver medalist(s)	Brian Mitchell	United States	1:25:12
3rd place, bronze medalist(s)	Arkadiusz Skrzypinski	Poland	1:25:12
4	Edward Maalouf	Lebanon	1:28:08
5	Rob Martin	New Zealand	1:32:12

=== Handcycle women ===
Position	Athlete	Nationality	Time
1st place, gold medalist(s)	Helene Hines	United States	1:53:51
2nd place, silver medalist(s)	Minda Dentler	United States	2:06:50
3rd place, bronze medalist(s)	Kirstie Louis Honeywill Sykes	United Kingdom	2:43:55
4	Nadine McNeil	United States	3:33:50
5	Marissa Strock	United States	3:40:19
