= Atsede Habtamu =

Ethiopian long-distance runner (born 1987)

Atsede Habtamu Besuye (born 26 October 1987) is an Ethiopian long-distance runner who specialises in road running and the marathon distance.

She came to prominence at the IAAF World Road Running Championships in 2007 where, at the age of nineteen, she ran a time of 1:08:29 for the half marathon – a record for a teenage athlete. She stepped up to the marathon a couple of years later and was runner-up on her debut at the Dubai Marathon. She ran at the Boston Marathon later that year but had her first success at the Berlin Marathon, which she won in a personal best time of 2:24:47. She ran course records to win at the 2010 Eindhoven Marathon, 2011 Daegu Marathon and 2012 Tokyo Marathon.

== Career ==
Born in the Ethiopian capital of Addis Ababa, Atsede Habtamu's first appearances at elite level came about after a performance at the Ethiopian 20 km trials for the 2007 IAAF World Road Running Championships. Her finishing time of 1:11.06 for second place behind Bezunesh Bekele was a surprise result for the unknown athlete. At the World Road Running Championships in Udine, Italy, she was fifth and finished behind Bezunesh who set a national record for the distance and led the Ethiopians to the team silver medal. Her time of 1:08:29 made the 19-year-old Atsede the fastest ever teenager to run the half marathon at that point. She ran at the Delhi Half Marathon two weeks later and led through much of the race, eventually clocking 1:10:30 to finish as runner-up behind Deriba Alemu. The Great Ethiopian Run the following month was her first major race over 10 kilometres, but she faded in the final third of the race and finished in ninth position.

She signed up for the Ras Al Khaimah Half Marathon in February 2008 and a tactical race resulted in Atsede recording the same time as Salina Kosgei and Pamela Chepchumba, with the Ethiopian taking third place on the podium. She took both athletes again a month later at the Lisbon Half Marathon but, while the Kenyans completed a 1–2, Atsede was sixth in the competition. For the 2008 IAAF World Half Marathon Championships, she led the Ethiopian women's team However, she was beaten by three of her compatriots and her eighth-place finish left her out of both the individual and team medals. She took on two of her national rivals (Aselefech Mergia and Getanesh Getanah) at the Delhi Half Marathon in November but again finished behind them, although her time of 1:09:37 was enough for fourth place. She closed the year with a third-place finish at the Bahir Dar Cross Country meeting.

=== Marathon debut ===
The Dubai Marathon in January 2009 was the venue for Atsede's debut over the marathon distance. While poor weather prevented the possibility of a quick time, she finished in 2:25:17 for second place behind Bezunesh, beating more experienced runners including defending champion Berhane Adere and Helena Kirop. Given her strong first time performance, she was among the elite women's field for the Boston Marathon three months later. She ran a time of 2:35:34 for seventh place in her first outing in North America. The 21-year-old took part in her second World Marathon Major of the year at the Berlin Marathon in September. Her fellow Ethiopian Askale Tafa was the pre-race favourite, but Atsede upset the prediction by taking the lead at the 30 km and never relinquishing it. She recorded a personal best of 2:24:47 to win the race, crossing the line over a minute and half ahead of the rest of the field."I am happy to have reached my goal and achieved a time of sub 2:25", she said. "From 30 k onwards I had problems with my left big toe, but despite this I felt strong and confident."

She opened the 2010 season by returning to the half marathon in Ras Al Khaimah. She was sixth in the race while distance-débutante Elvan Abeylegesse took the honours. She turned her attention to the London Marathon in April, but was beaten into twelfth place and finished almost ten minutes behind race winner Liliya Shobukhova. Her next marathon appearance came at the Eindhoven Marathon in October and she led from the start and seemed likely to break her personal best. Helped by her own pacemaker, she reached the 30 km mark a minute faster than her Berlin run. She slowed in the final few kilometres but her time of 2:25:35 brought her her first marathon win and a new course record – bettering Nadja Wijenberg's mark which had stood for over a decade. She set a new personal best of 2:24:26 at the Dubai Marathon in January 2011, where she came fourth.

She came close to winning the national title at the Major General Hayelom Araya 15km Championships in February, but was edged at the line by Dire Tune. She came third at the World's Best 10K, forming an Ethiopian sweep with Sentayehu Ejigu and Dire Tune. She claimed victory at the Daegu Marathon, running a race record time of 2:25:52 for the test course of the 2011 World Championships in Athletics. She ran a personal best of 2:24.25 hours at the 2011 Berlin Marathon, which was only enough for fourth place behind Paula Radcliffe in a quick field. At the Great Ethiopian Run in November she came third behind fellow marathoner Tiki Gelana. A fast finish at the 2012 Tokyo Marathon saw her break the course record with a winning time of 2:25:28 hours.

== Personal bests ==
Event	Time (h:m:s)	Venue	Date
10 km	31:28	New Delhi, India	9 November 2008
Half marathon	1:08:29	Udine, Italy	14 October 2007
Marathon	2:24:25	Berlin, Germany	25 September 2011

- All information taken from IAAF profile.

== Major victories ==
- (gold) 2009 Berlin Marathon
- (gold) 2010 Eindhoven Marathon (course record: 2:25:35)
- (gold) 2011 Daegu Marathon (course record: 2:25:52)
- (gold) 2012 Tokyo Marathon (course record: 2:25:28)
