= Robert Kiprono Cheruiyot =

Kenyan marathon runner

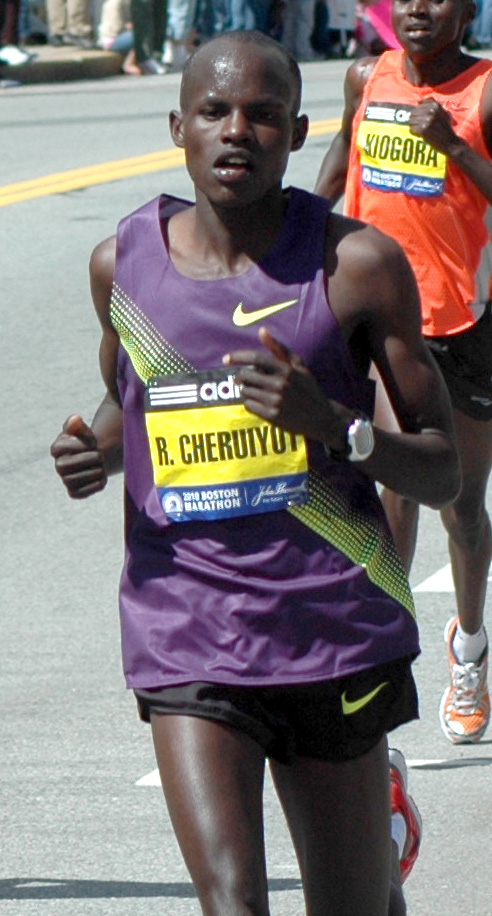
- Robert Kiprono Cheruiyot in the 2010 Boston Marathon near half way point in Wellesley.

Personal information
- Full name: Robert Kiprono Cheruiyot
- Nationality: Kenyan
- Born: August 10, 1988 (age 37) Bomet, Rift Valley Province, Kenya

Sport
- Sport: Running
- Event: Marathon

Robert Kiprono Cheruiyot (born August 10, 1988) is a Kenyan marathon runner. He is known as a "true marathoner" who rarely races other distances. He finished fifth or better in the first four international marathons he has entered.

== Biography ==
Hailing from Bomet in Kenya's Rift Valley Province, Cheruiyot's international debut was at the 2008 Frankfurt Marathon. Since he was not experienced, he had to purchase his own way and turn in a time under 2:14:00 to be reimbursed. He proceeded to surprise everyone, including himself, winning the race with a course record 2:07:21.

In 2009, Cheruiyot finished fifth at the Alphen aan den Rijn 20 km and followed it up with a fifth-place finish at the 2009 Boston Marathon six weeks later with time of 2:10:06. In the fall, he returned to Frankfurt to defend his title. He turned in a time of 2:06:23, a new personal best, and finished second.

In 2010, Cheruiyot won the Boston Marathon with a time of 2:05:52, breaking the course record by more than a minute. The weather for the race was excellent – high 40s with a headwind of 13 mph (21 km/h). Cheruiyot and 2009 champion, Deriba Merga, left the rest of the field behind at Heartbreak Hill, completing the mile that includes the hill in a blistering 4:37. The two ran neck and neck before Cheruiyot started to pull away at Coolidge Corner with 2.5 miles (4.0 km) to go. Merga then faded and finished third. Tekeste Kebede finished second, more than 1:30 behind Cheruiyot with a time of 2:07:23. The previous record of 2:07:14 was held by Cheruiyot's countryman Robert Kipkoech Cheruiyot. Of his win, Cheruiyot said simply "I tried to show my talent." He said he would use his US$175,000 in winnings to purchase more cows for his 50-acre (200,000 m^{2}) farm in Eldoret. He became the seventeenth Kenyan to win the men's Boston race in a period of 20 years.

His next major outing came at the 2010 Chicago Marathon, but he was below his Boston form, finishing in sixth place some three minutes behind race winner Samuel Wanjiru. He returned to defend his title at the 2011 Boston Marathon and although his time of 2:06:43 hours was comparatively quick, he came sixth and was over three and a half minutes behind winner Geoffrey Mutai. His second race of the year came at the Frankfurt Marathon, but again he was out of contention and finished fifth with a time of 2:06:29 hours.

Cheruiyot lives and trains with accomplished marathoner William Kiplagat, who also serves as his coach. He is not related to former Boston course record holder Robert Kipkoech Cheruiyot, although their similar names are often mentioned in press articles. Robert Kiprono Cheruiyot is a member of the Kipsigis tribe, whereas Robert Kipkoech Cheruiyot is from the Nandi tribe.

== Personal bests ==
Event	Time (h:m:s)	Venue	Date
Half marathon	1:01:22	Rotterdam, Netherlands	13 September 2009
Marathon*	2:05:52	Boston, USA	19 April 2010
Marathon	2:06:23	Frankfurt, Germany	25 October 2009

(*) Downhill and point-to-point course

- All information taken from IAAF profile.

== Achievements ==
- All results regarding marathon, unless stated otherwise

Year	Competition	Venue	Position	Event	Notes
Representing Kenya
2008	Frankfurt Marathon	Frankfurt, Germany	1st	Marathon	2:07:21
2009	Boston Marathon	Boston, MA	6th	Marathon	2:10:06
2009	Frankfurt Marathon	Frankfurt, Germany	2nd	Marathon	2:06:23
2010	Boston Marathon	Boston, MA	1st	Marathon	2:05:52
2010	2010 Chicago Marathon	Chicago, IL	6th	Marathon	2:09:28
2011	2011 Boston Marathon	Boston, MA	6th	Marathon	2:06:43
2011	Frankfurt Marathon	Frankfurt, Germany	5th	Marathon	2:06:29
