= Lidiya Grigoryeva =

Russian long-distance runner

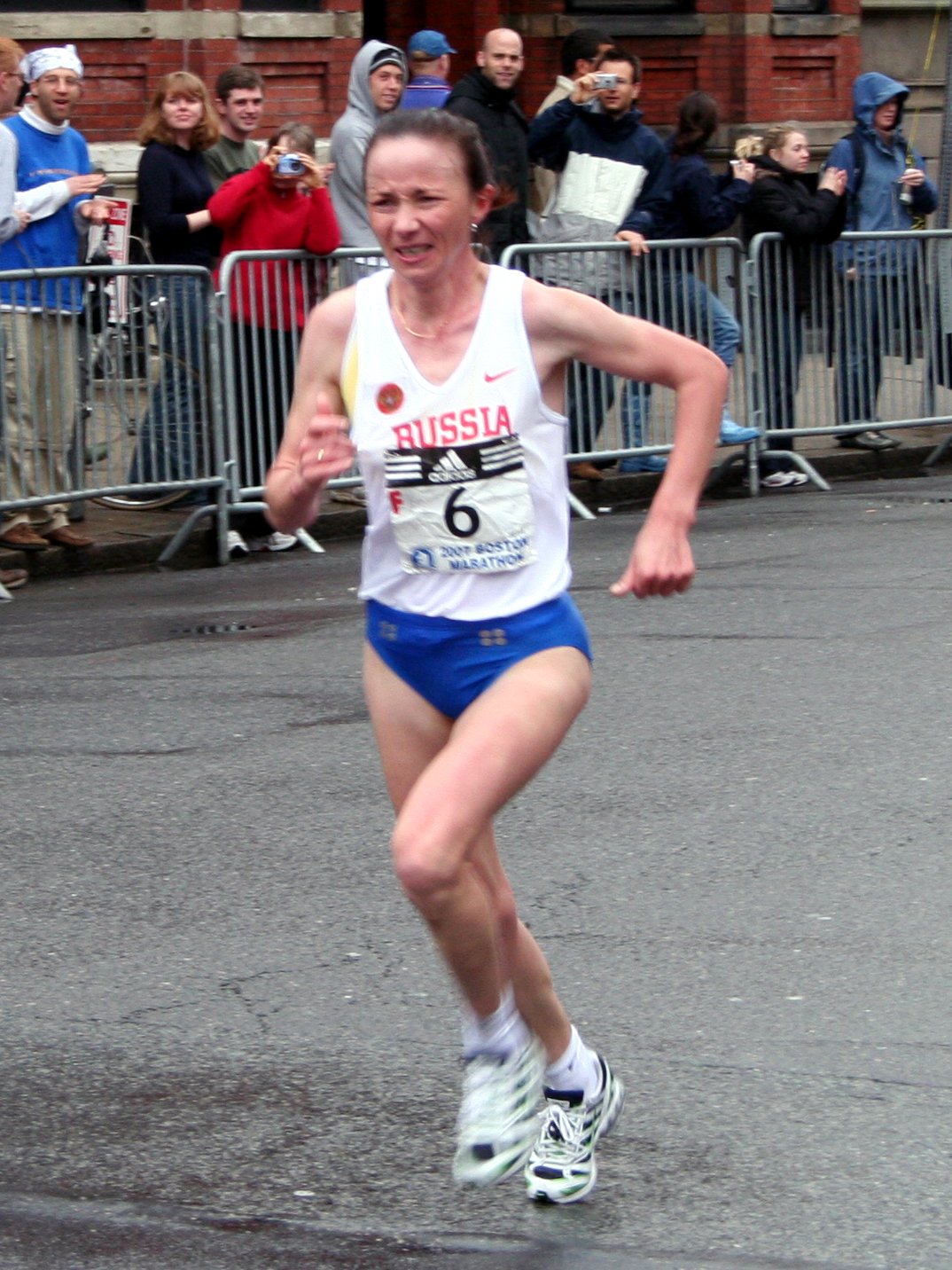

Sport
- Country: Russia
- Sport: Women's athletics
Medal record
European Championships
Bronze medal – third place	2006 Gothenburg	10,000 metres

Lidiya Grigoryeva (Russian: Лидия Григорьева; born 25 January 1974 in Smychka, Chuvash ASSR) is a Russian long-distance runner from the Chuvashia region.

== Running career ==
Grigoryeva won the bronze medal in the 10,000 metres at the 2006 European Championships in Athletics in Gothenburg, Sweden in a time of 30:32.72, a new personal best and the tenth-best time ever run by a European woman. She also won the 2006 Los Angeles Marathon in a time of 2:25:10 and the 2005 Paris Marathon in 2:27:01. Her personal best over the half marathon is 1:11:01, run in Edmonton at the 2005 IAAF World Half Marathon Championships. She was the women's 2007 Boston Marathon winner with a time of 2:29:18, and captured the 2008 Chicago Marathon title with a 2:27:17 time.

Grigoryeva competed for Russia at the 2000 and 2004 Olympics in the 10,000 metres, finishing ninth and eighth respectively.

== Doping ==
In 2016, the IAAF announced that the then-42-year-old Grigoryeva had been banned 2 1/2 years for doping, based on the results of her biological passport. All results from April 17, 2009, to May 14, 2010, were canceled for Grigorieva.

== See also ==
- List of doping cases in athletics
- List of winners of the Boston Marathon
- List of winners of the Chicago Marathon
- List of European Athletics Championships medalists (women)
