= Girma Bekele Gebre =

Ethiopian marathon runner

Personal information
- Born: 29 December 1992 (age 33) Ethiopia

Sport
- Sport: Athletics
Medal record
Representing Ethiopia
Middle-distance running
World Youth Championships
| Bronze medal – third place | 2009 Brixen | 1500 m |
Marathon
World Marathon Majors
| Bronze medal – third place | 2019 New York | Marathon |

Girma Bekele Gebre (Amharic: ግርማ በቀለ ገብረ, romanized: Girma Bek’ele Gebre; born 29 December 1992) is an Ethiopian marathon runner who finished third at the 2019 New York City Marathon as a non-elite runner. Gebre also won the 2018 Brooklyn Half Marathon, and came third in the 1,500 metres event at the 2009 World Youth Championships in Athletics.

== Personal life ==
Gebre splits his time between living in New York and Ethiopia. In 2019, he moved back to Ethiopia after the death of one of his brothers. His brother Alemu Bekele competed for Bahrain at the 2016 and 2020 Summer Olympics.

== Career ==
When in New York, Gebre competes for the West Side Runners, and has won multiple club races. Whilst in Ethiopia, he trains at altitude in Addis Ababa. In 2009, Gebre came third in the 1,500 metres event at the 2009 World Youth Championships in Athletics.

In 2016, Gebre came fourth at the Abbott Dash to the Finish Line 5-K event in New York City. In 2018, Gebre won the Brooklyn Half Marathon, in a time of 1:04:56. In the same year, he finished third at the Abbott Dash to the Finish Line 5-K event, ninth at the Broad Street Run, and came 19th in the 2018 New York City Marathon. He also came third in the 10k event at the Bermuda Marathon Weekend, and competed in a 5k race in Alexandria, Virginia. In 2019, Gebre finished the Pittsburgh Marathon in a time of 2:13:46.

Gebre entered the 2019 New York City Marathon as a non-elite runner, and had to pay an entry fee for the event, rather than receiving an appearance fee as elite athletes did. Gebre didn't have a sponsor or an agent, and the night before the race, he stayed with a friend in The Bronx and slept on a couch. In the race, he joined the lead pack in Brooklyn, where the elite and non-elite courses met. He was in the front group of five runners after 35 kilometres (22 mi) of the race, and was in the front four after another runner dropped away from the lead pack. He finished third in the race, and his finishing time of 2:08:38 was 25 seconds behind race winner Geoffrey Kamworor. He finished ahead of more experienced Ethiopians Tamirat Tola and Shura Kitata, and beat his previous personal best by over five minutes. Gebre won $40,000 for finishing in third place, $15,000 for finishing in under 2:09:00, and $5,000 for being the highest ranked runner from New York in the race. Gebre said he would use the money to help his family, and it took him 18 months to receive his prize money, as he doesn't have an American bank account. During the COVID-19 pandemic, Gebre worked on a farm in Ethiopia.

== Awards ==
In January 2020, Gebre was awarded the New York Road Runners male runner of the year award.
