= 2018 New York City Marathon =

Marathon race in 2018

48th New York City Marathon
- Location: New York City, New York
- Date: November 4

Champions
- Men: Lelisa Desisa (2:05:59)
- Women: Mary Jepkosgei Keitany (2:22:48)
- Wheelchair men: Daniel Romanchuk (1:36:21)
- Wheelchair women: Manuela Schär (1:50:27)

The 2018 New York City Marathon was a marathon race held in New York City, New York, which took place on November 4, 2018. It was the 48th edition of the New York City Marathon, which is organised by New York Road Runners. The men's race was won by Lelisa Desisa, who held off a late challenge at the finish by Shura Kitata. The women's race was won by Mary Keitany, her fourth win of the event. Both Desisa and Keitany recorded the second fastest times on the course. In the wheelchair races, Daniel Romanchuk (1:36:21) and Switzerland's Manuela Schär (1:50:27) won the men's and women's races, respectively. A total of 52,704 runners finished the race, comprising 30,592 men and 22,112 women.

== Course ==
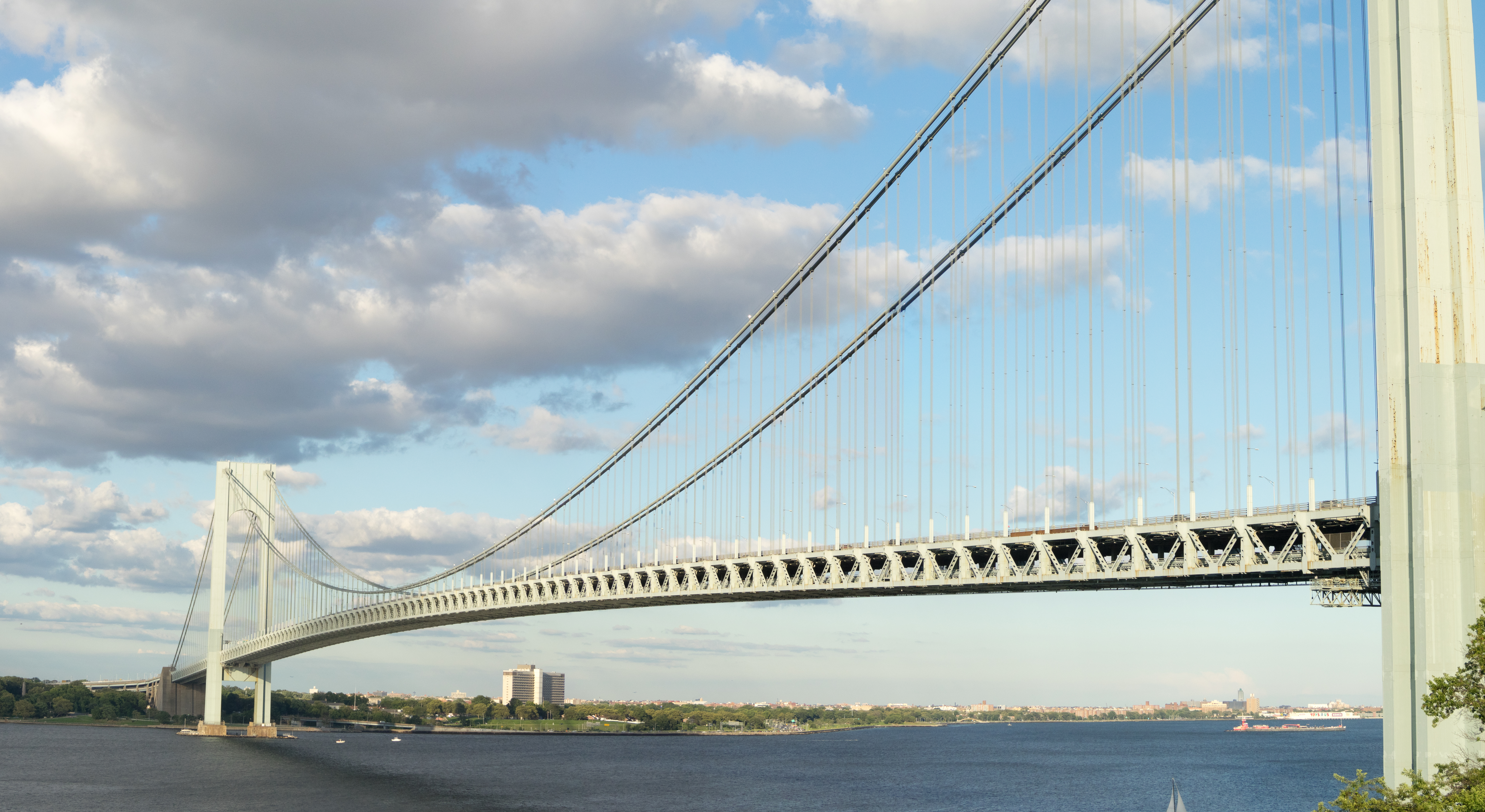
The Verrazzano–Narrows Bridge

The marathon distance is officially 42.195 kilometres (26.219 mi) long as sanctioned by World Athletics (IAAF). The New York City Marathon starts at Fort Wadsworth on Staten Island, New York City. The first two miles of the course stay on the island, before the runners cross the Verrazzano–Narrows Bridge into Brooklyn. The streets in this borough are flat and the runners remain here until mile 12. The runners then enter Queens before crossing the Queensboro Bridge at mile 13.

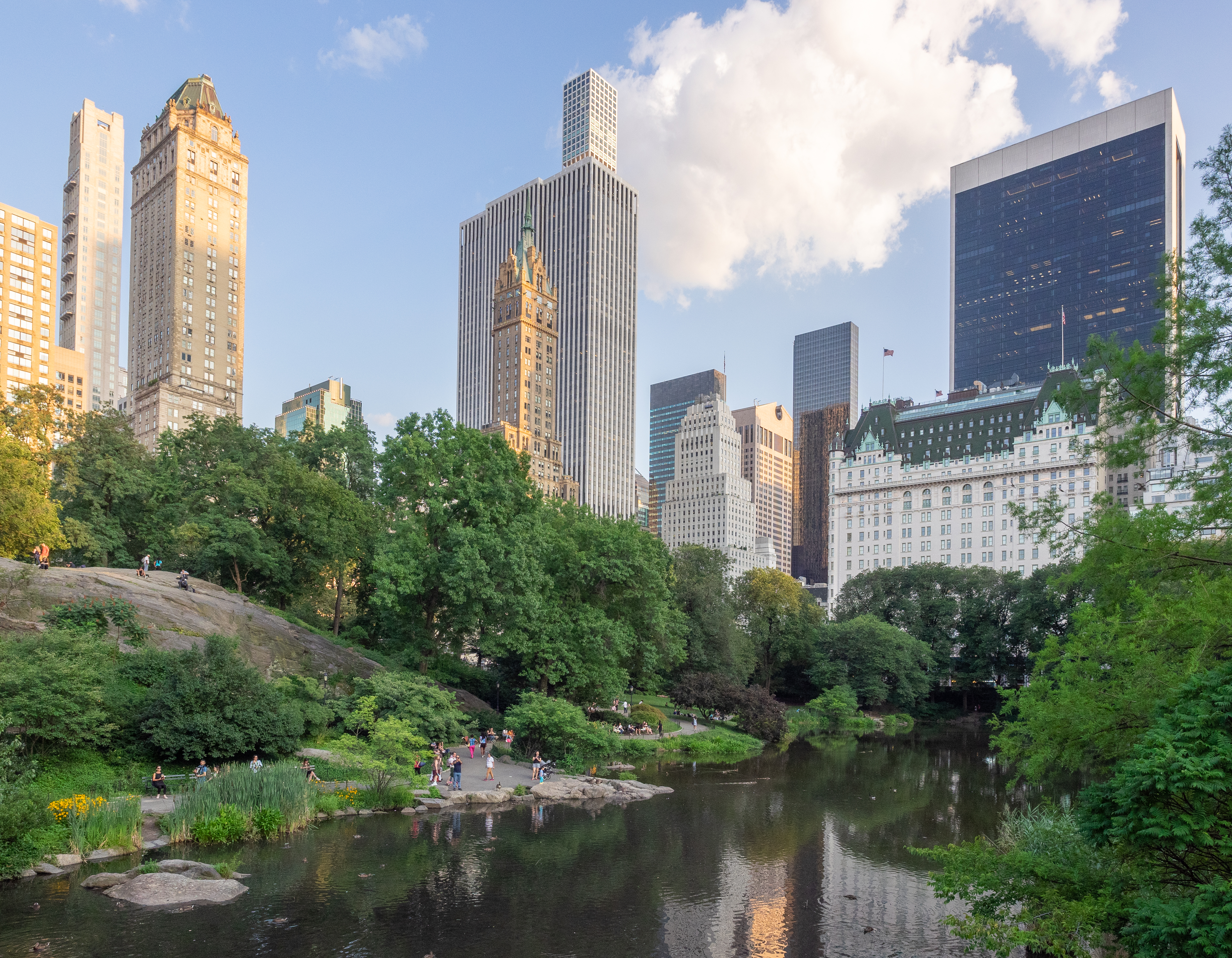
Central Park, the location of the finish of the race

After crossing the bridge, the runners enter Manhattan and run down First Avenue. The runners then enter The Bronx for miles 19 and 20 and pass the 'Entertainment Zone' which includes bands and dancers. The course then re-enters Manhattan for the final 6.2 miles (10.0 km). After running through Harlem, there is a slight uphill section along Fifth Avenue before it flattens out and runs parallel to Central Park. The course then enters the park around mile 24, passes Columbus Circle at mile 25 and re-enters the park for the finish.

== Field ==
The "hot favorite" for the men's race was Geoffrey Kamworor, who had won the previous edition in 2:10:53, three seconds ahead of Wilson Kipsang. Kamworor had been training with Eliud Kipchoge, who Ken Belson of The New York Times called the "greatest marathoner ever", in the lead up to the race. Also in the race were 2013 and 2015 Boston Marathon winner Lelisa Desisa, Shura Kitata, who came second at the 2018 London Marathon, and 2017 London winner Daniel Wanjiru. In the elite women's field, there were 11 former winners of the race, including the defending champion Shalane Flanagan. Others in the field included Des Linden, winner of the 2018 Boston Marathon, Mary Keitany, runner-up in the previous edition, winner of the 2014, 2015, and 2016 editions, and who also held the quickest personal best time of 2:17:01 in the field, and Vivian Cheruiyot, winner of the 2018 London Marathon.

== Race summary ==
In the women's race, a group of 24 runners remained in the lead group until just before the halfway point when Keitany, along with others such as Rhama Tusa and Netsanet Gudeta, broke away. A group of eight, led by Tusa and Gudeta, went through halfway in 1:15:49. Tusa, Gudeta, Keitany broke away from the group leaving a chasing pack, containing the likes of Cheruiyot, Flanagan, and Molly Huddle. However, by 20 miles (32 km), Gudeta had fallen out of the group and eventually dropped out of the race at mile 23. Tusa was also dropped by Keitany, who ran a second-half split of 1:06:58 to win in a time of 2:22:48, just 17 seconds off the course record. Meanwhile, the chasing group managed to catch Tusa, and Cheruiyot, who reportedly ran with a hamstring injury, finished second in 2:26:02 and Flanagan finished third, 20 seconds behind. For her victory, Keitany was awarded $100,000, with an additional $45,000 for finishing in under 2:23:00.

The elite men's race was "far more competitive". Kitata pushed the pace in the first half of the race, with Desisa and Tamirat Tola also contributing to the pace-setting. A leading group comprising Desisa, Kitata, Tola, Kamworor, and Festus Talam went through halfway in 1:03:55. By this point, Wanjiru had been dropped. Talam and Tola dropped out of the group at 20 miles (32 km) and 22 miles (35 km), respectively. Kamworor then moved to the front of the group and made a move, with Desisa following. In the last 800 metres (2,600 ft), however, Kitata was able to catch Kamworor and closed in on Desisa, who was able to increase the pace to take the win in 2:05:59, the second fastest time in the race's history. Kitata was just two seconds back. Kamworor finished third in 2:06:26. Like the women's race, Desisa won $100,000 and $45,000 for finishing in under 2:06:00.

In the wheelchair men's race, Daniel Romanchuk went into the lead over the Verrazzano–Narrows Bridge, and was joined by David Weir and Marcel Hug, as they broke clear from the rest of the field. The race came down to a sprint which was won by Romanchuk, who completed the race in a time of 1:36:21, one second ahead of Hug and two seconds ahead of Weir. Romanchuk became the first American and the joint youngest winner of the wheelchair men's category in the race's history. His win also came after victory in the Chicago Marathon on October 7, where he also finished ahead of Hug. In the women's race, Tatyana McFadden, who was using a borrowed wheelchair as hers was damaged, took an early lead and led for the first half of the race. After an hour of racing, McFadden and Manuela Schär were clear of the rest of the field. Entering into Central Park, Schär dropped McFadden to win in a time of 1:50:27, with McFadden in second in 1:50:48 and Lihong Zou in third in 1:56:14.

== Results ==
Results reported by NBC Sports and New York Road Runners.

Men's race result
Position	Athlete	Nationality	Time
1st place, gold medalist(s)	Lelisa Desisa	Ethiopia	2:05:59
2nd place, silver medalist(s)	Shura Kitata	Ethiopia	2:06:01
3rd place, bronze medalist(s)	Geoffrey Kamworor	Kenya	2:06:26
4	Tamirat Tola	Ethiopia	2:08:30
5	Daniel Wanjiru	Kenya	2:10:21
6	Jared Ward	United States	2:12:24
7	Scott Fauble	United States	2:12:28
8	Festus Talam	Kenya	2:12:40
9	Shadrack Biwott	United States	2:12:52
10	Chris Derrick	United States	2:13:08

Women's race result
Position	Athlete	Nationality	Time
1st place, gold medalist(s)	Mary Keitany	Kenya	2:22:48
2nd place, silver medalist(s)	Vivian Cheruiyot	Kenya	2:26:02
3rd place, bronze medalist(s)	Shalane Flanagan	United States	2:26:22
4	Molly Huddle	United States	2:26:44
5	Rahma Tusa	Ethiopia	2:27:13
6	Des Linden	United States	2:27:51
7	Allie Kieffer	United States	2:28:12
8	Lisa Jane Weightman	Australia	2:29:11
9	Mamitu Daska	Ethiopia	2:30:31
10	Belaynesh Fikadu	Ethiopia	2:30:47

Wheelchair men's race result
Position	Athlete	Nationality	Time
1st place, gold medalist(s)	Daniel Romanchuk	United States	1:36:21
2nd place, silver medalist(s)	Marcel Hug	Switzerland	1:36:22
3rd place, bronze medalist(s)	David Weir	United Kingdom	1:36:23
4	Aaron Pike	United States	1:40:22
5	Kurt Fearnley	Australia	1:40:23
6	Tomoki Suzuki	Japan	1:40:28
7	Jordi Jiménez	Spain	1:41:13
8	Josh George	United States	1:41:36
9	Hiroyuki Yamamoto	Japan	1:45:15
10	Josh Cassidy	United States	1:47:02

Wheelchair women's race result
Position	Athlete	Nationality	Time
1st place, gold medalist(s)	Manuela Schär	Switzerland	1:50:27
2nd place, silver medalist(s)	Tatyana McFadden	United States	1:50:48
3rd place, bronze medalist(s)	Zou Lihong	China	1:56:14
4	Eliza Ault-Connell	Australia	1:57:00
5	Margriet van den Broek	Netherlands	1:57:30
6	Madison de Rozario	Australia	1:58:06
7	Susannah Scaroni	United States	1:59:55
8	Sandra Graf	Switzerland	2:00:00
9	Katrina Gerhard	United States	2:00:19
10	Aline Rocha	Brazil	2:06:10
