= 2019 New York City Marathon =

49th running of the marathon

Coordinates: 40.6019°N 74.0624°W

49th New York City Marathon
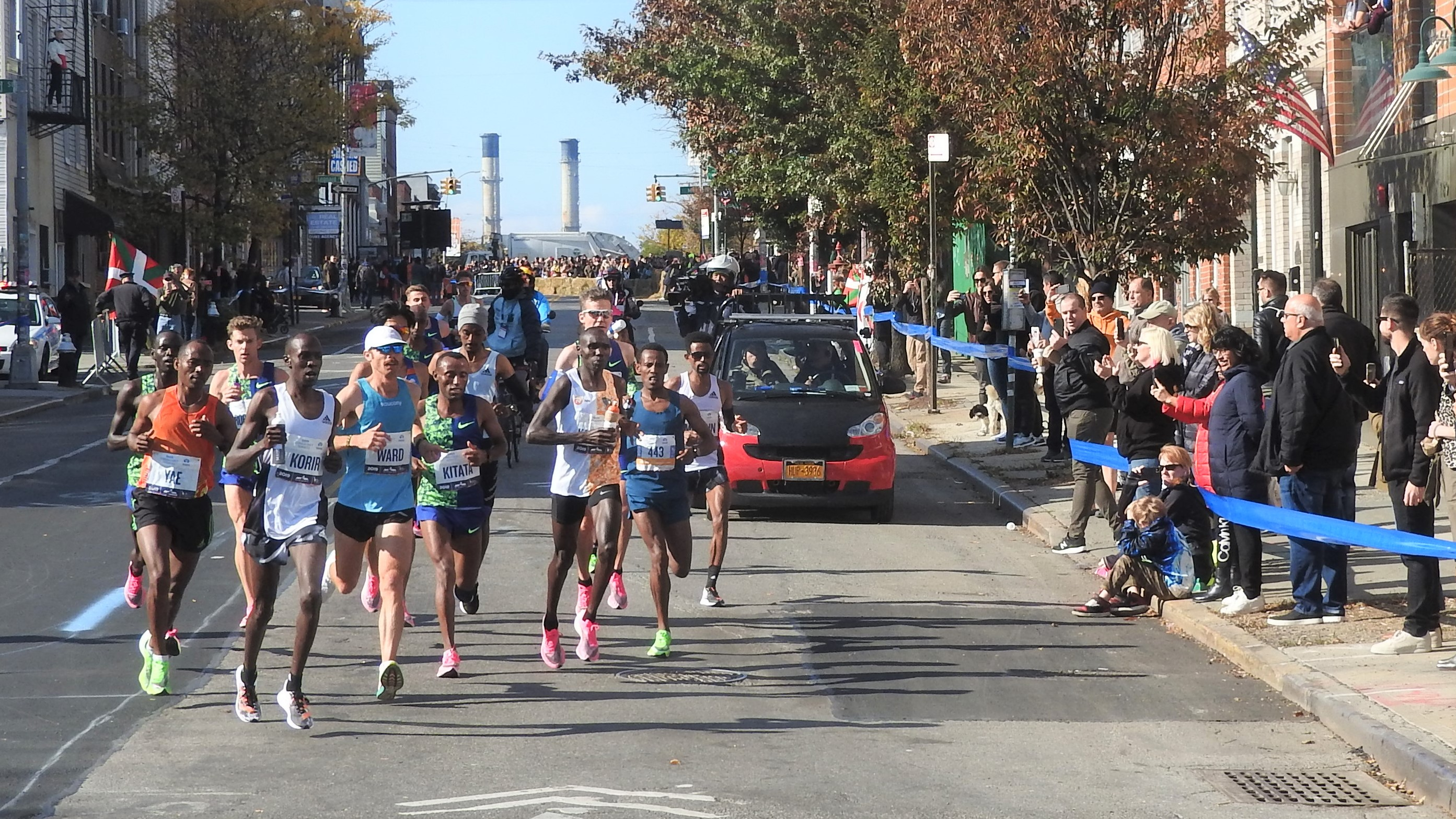
- The men's leading pack
- Location: New York City, New York
- Date: November 3, 2019

Champions
- Men: Geoffrey Kamworor (2:08:13)
- Women: Joyciline Jepkosgei (2:22:38)
- Wheelchair men: Daniel Romanchuk (1:37:24)
- Wheelchair women: Manuela Schär (1:44:20)

The 2019 New York City Marathon was the 49th running of the annual marathon race held in New York City, New York, which took place on November 3, 2019. The men's race was won by Kenyan Geoffrey Kamworor in a time of 2:08:13. The women's race was won in 2:22:38 by Kenyan Joyciline Jepkosgei, making her official debut at the distance. The men and women's wheelchair races, were won by American Daniel Romanchuk (1:37:24) and Switzerland's Manuela Schär (1:44:20), respectively. A total of 53,508 runners finished the race, comprising 30,794 men and 22,714 women.

== Course ==
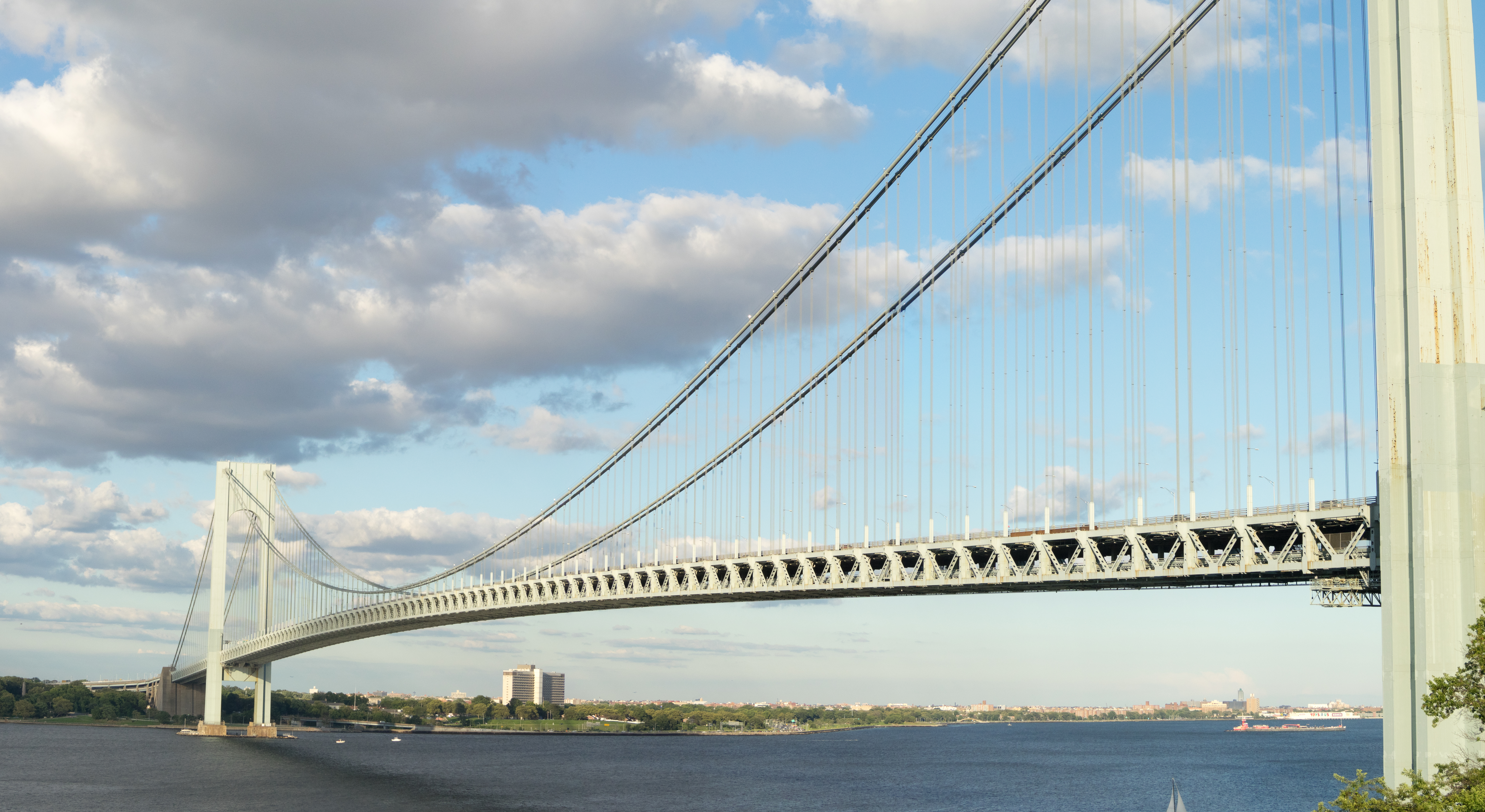
The Verrazzano–Narrows Bridge

The marathon distance is officially 42.195 kilometres (26.219 mi) long as sanctioned by World Athletics (IAAF). The New York City Marathon starts at Fort Wadsworth on Staten Island, New York City. The first two miles of the course stay on the island, before the runners cross the Verrazzano–Narrows Bridge into Brooklyn. The streets in this borough are flat and the runners remain here until mile 12. The runners then enter Queens before crossing the Queensboro Bridge at mile 13.

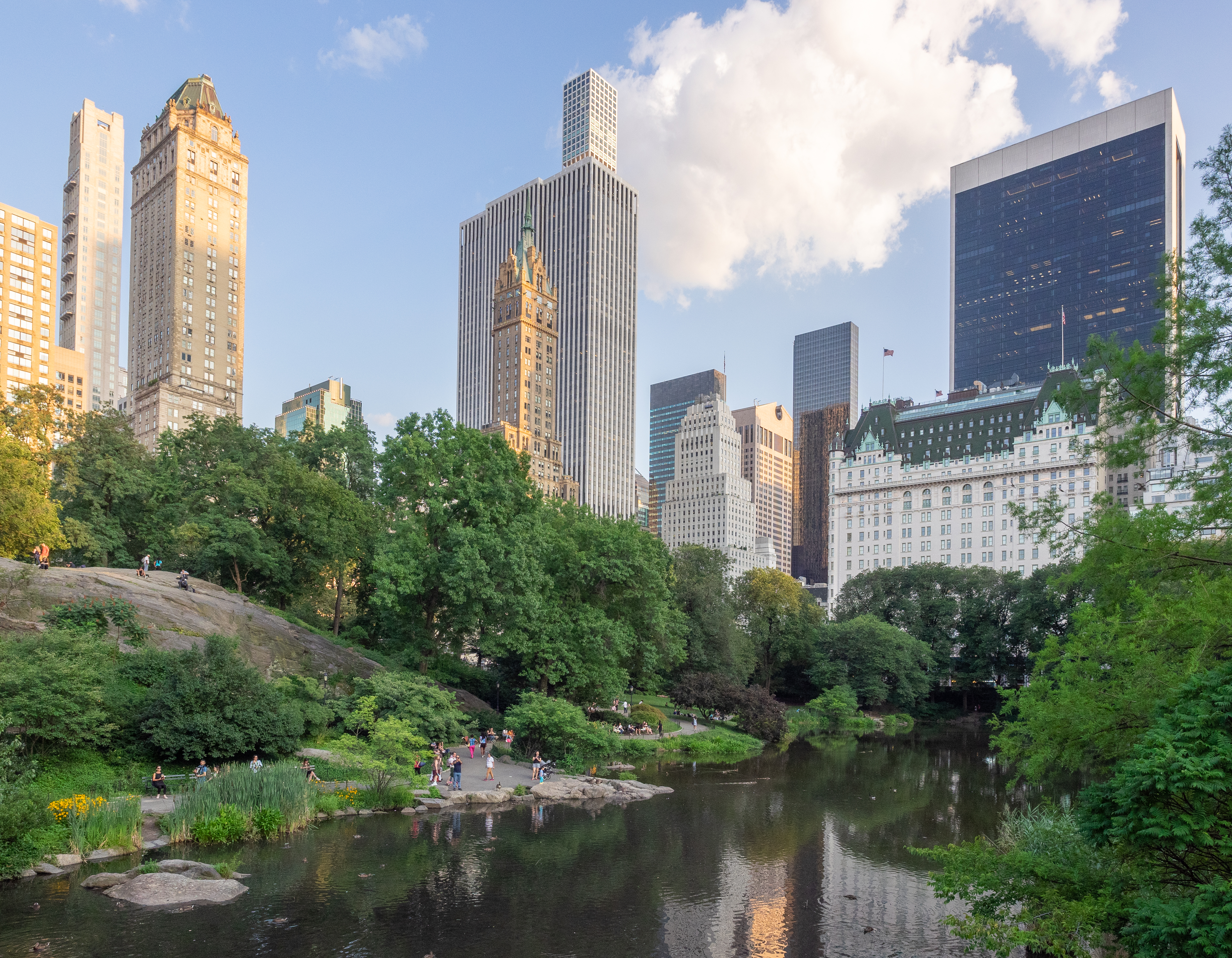
Central Park, the location of the finish of the race

After crossing the bridge, the runners enter Manhattan and run down First Avenue. The runners then enter The Bronx for miles 19 and 20 and pass the 'Entertainment Zone' which includes bands and dancers. The course then re-enters Manhattan for the final 6.2 miles (10.0 km). After running through Harlem, there is a slight uphill section along Fifth Avenue before it flattens out and runs parallel to Central Park. The course then enters the park around mile 24, passes Columbus Circle at mile 25 and re-enters the park for the finish.

== Field ==
In the women's race, 2018 winner Mary Keitany and half-marathon world record holder Joyceline Jepkosgei were favorites. Keitany was a four-time winner of the race, but Jepkosgei had never run a marathon race before. Also racing were Des Linden, Worknesh Degefa, and Ruti Aga, the respective winners of the 2018, and 2019 Boston Marathon, and 2019 Tokyo Marathon. The men's field included three sub-2:06 runners; Tamirat Tola, Lelisa Desisa, and Shura Kitata, all of whom are from Ethiopia. Desisa was the favorite, however, having won the 2013 and 2015 Boston Marathon, and the 2018 New York City Marathon. 2017 winner Geoffrey Kamworor of Kenya also raced.

In the wheelchair race, the men's favorite was 20-year-old Daniel Romanchuk who had won the 2018 edition, 2019 Chicago Marathon, 2019 Boston Marathon, and the 2019 London Marathon. Also racing were David Weir, Ernst Van Dyk, and Marcel Hug, all previous winners of the race. In the women's wheelchair race, the favorite was Manuela Schär who had won the last six World Marathon Majors in a row. She faced the greatest competition from Americans Tatyana McFadden, Amanda McGrory, and Susannah Scaroni.

The wheelchair race started at 8:30 EST (UTC−5), the women's at 9:10 EST and the men's at 9:40 EST. The winners of the men and women's races each won $100,000, and $25,000 each in the wheelchair category whilst a prize of $25,000 was given to the fastest man and woman from the United States. The temperature on the day of the race was an "ideal" 45 °F (7 °C).

== Race summary ==
In the women's wheelchair race, Schär took an early lead and won with little competition from the other athletes in a time of 1:44:20. McFadden and Scaroni finished second and third in 1:48:19 and 1:51:37, respectively. The men's wheelchair race, on the other hand, was much more tightly contested. Romanchuk pulled away early on and had put a 20-second gap between himself and Hug at the 5 kilometres (3.1 mi) mark, but this was reduced to nine seconds at 10 kilometres (6.2 mi). They went through 15 kilometres (9.3 mi) in 31:11 side-by-side and at halfway were both over a minute ahead of the chasing group comprising Weir and Aaron Pike. At 25 kilometres (16 mi) the gap had been brought down to 50 seconds and 10 kilometres later, the two groups had joined up. Once again, Romanchuk was able to get clear of the rest, and crossed the finish line in first place just one second ahead of Hug, as was the case the previous year. Romanchuk finished in 1:37:24, Hug in 1:37:25, Weir finished three seconds behind in 1:37:28, and Pike finished 5 seconds behind in 1:37:33. The men's handcycle race was won by Omar Duran and the women's was won by Devann Murphy.

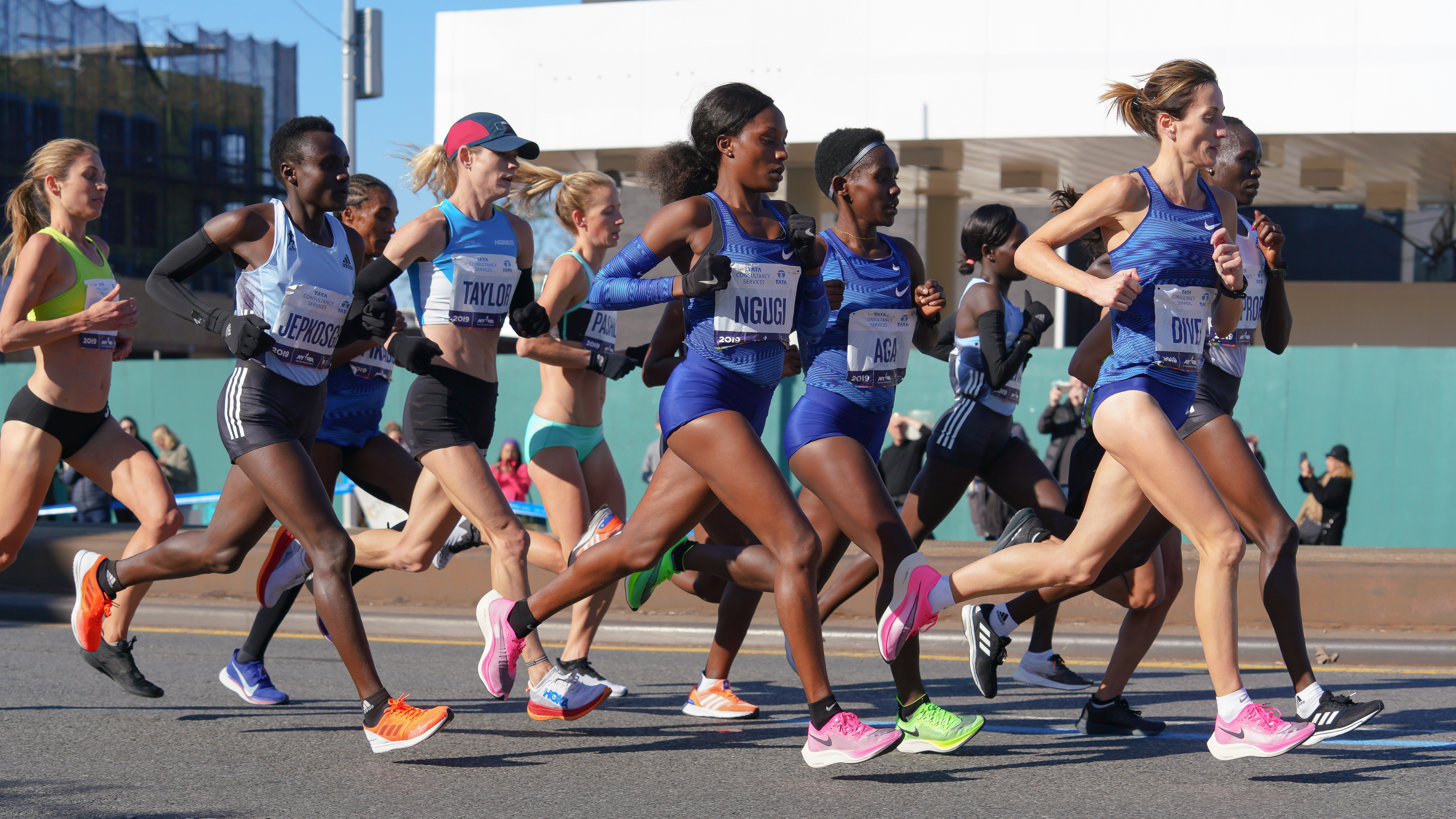
The leading women's group along Fourth Avenue, Brooklyn.

In the women's race Linden broke away from the leading pack and had built up a 15-second gap by 8 miles (13 km) which extended to 31 seconds by mile 11, but she was later caught by a pack of four before the halfway mark. American Sara Hall dropped out with a stomach illness after 18 miles (29 km). At 20 miles (32 km) into the race, Keitany and Jepkosgei were in the lead together, but 3 miles (4.8 km) later, Jepkosgei began to pull away and had put a four-second gap between the two. The lead further increased to 16 seconds by mile 25 and she eventually finished in a time of 2:22:38, 54 seconds ahead of Keitany who finished second. Ruti Aga finished third in a time of 2:25:51. Jepkosgei's time is the second fastest on the course, behind the 2003 performance by Margaret Okayo. She was also the youngest winner, at the age of 25, since Okayo won in 2001. Sinead Diver, at 42-years-old, was the oldest woman to finish in the top five since Priscilla Welch won in 1987. Jepkosgei, in addition to the $100,000 of prize money, also earned $45,000 for finishing in under 2:23:00. Linden won the prize for fastest American, finishing sixth in 2:26:26.

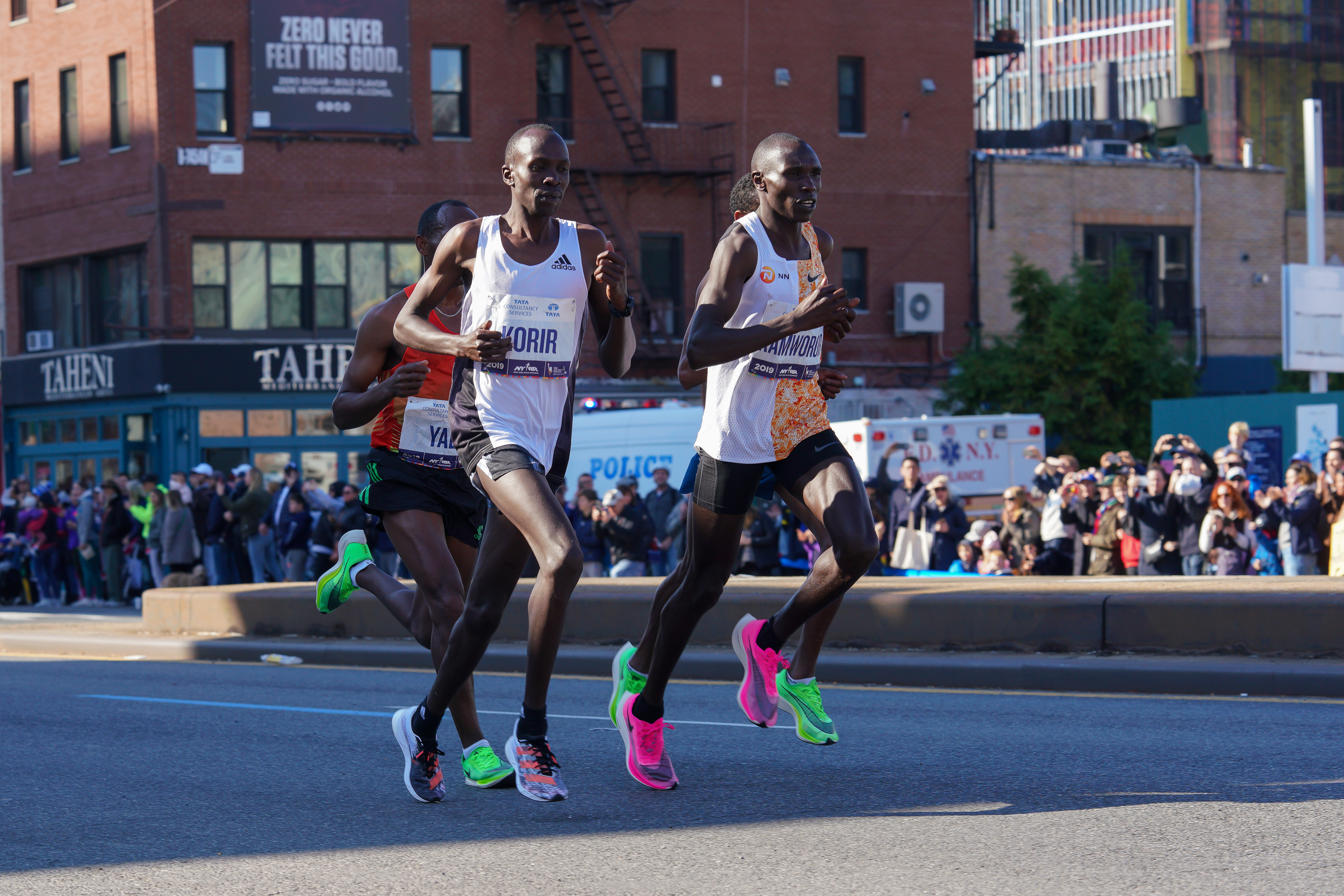
Korir and Kamworor along Fourth Avenue, Brooklyn.

In the men's race, Desisa dropped out after 7 miles (11 km) due to tightness in his hamstring. ABC News suggested that the cause was his "taxing" victory in the marathon event at the 2019 World Athletics Championships in Doha, Qatar just 29 days earlier. The leading group went through 10 kilometres (6.2 mi) in 30:32, and halfway in 1:04:49, with fourteen still present. Brett Robinson broke away from the pack and led through mile 15 in 1:14:13, but was caught within the next mile. The group had dwindled to just five runners when they reached mile 20 in 1:38:59; Kamworor, Girma Bekele Gebre, Albert Korir, Kitata, and Tola. The group further broke up and Kamworor eventually left Korir in the 24th mile and was able to win the race in 2:08:13. Korir finished in second with a time of 2:08:36. Girma Bekele Gebre, an unsponsored Ethiopian who started with the open field instead of the elite runners, finished in third place in 2:08:38. He also came to the race with no agent, and had stayed with a friend in The Bronx. Jared Ward won the prize for the top American, finishing sixth in 2:10:45.

=== Non-elite race ===
There were 53,627 finishers from 141 countries in the non-elite race, up from 52,812 in 2018, making it the largest marathon in history. The race had a 98.9 percent completion rate with 578 dropping out.

== Results ==
=== Men ===
Elite men's top 10 finishers
Position	Athlete	Nationality	Time
1st place, gold medalist(s)	Geoffrey Kamworor	Kenya	2:08:13
2nd place, silver medalist(s)	Albert Korir	Kenya	2:08:36
3rd place, bronze medalist(s)	Girma Bekele Gebre	Ethiopia	2:08:38
4	Tamirat Tola	Ethiopia	2:09:20
5	Shura Kitata	Ethiopia	2:10:39
6	Jared Ward	United States	2:10:45
7	Stephen Sambu	Kenya	2:11:11
8	Yoshiki Takenouchi	Japan	2:11:18
9	Abdihakem Abdirahman	United States	2:11:34
10	Connor McMillan	United States	2:12:07

=== Women ===
Elite women's top 10 finishers
Position	Athlete	Nationality	Time
1st place, gold medalist(s)	Joyciline Jepkosgei	Kenya	2:22:38
2nd place, silver medalist(s)	Mary Keitany	Kenya	2:23:32
3rd place, bronze medalist(s)	Ruti Aga	Ethiopia	2:25:51
4	Nancy Kiprop	Kenya	2:26:21
5	Sinead Diver	Australia	2:26:23
6	Des Linden	United States	2:26:46
7	Kellyn Taylor	United States	2:26:52
8	Ellie Pashley	Australia	2:27:07
9	Belaynesh Fikadu	Ethiopia	2:27:27
10	Mary Wacera Ngugi	Kenya	2:27:36

=== Wheelchair men ===
Wheelchair men's top 10 finishers
Position	Athlete	Nationality	Time
1st place, gold medalist(s)	Daniel Romanchuk	United States	1:37:24
2nd place, silver medalist(s)	Marcel Hug	Switzerland	1:37:26
3rd place, bronze medalist(s)	David Weir	United Kingdom	1:37:28
4	Aaron Pike	United States	1:37:33
5	Ernst van Dyk	South Africa	1:40:00
6	Johnboy Smith	United Kingdom	1:40:01
7	Josh George	United States	1:40:01
8	Patrick Monahan	Ireland	1:40:05
9	Simon Lawson	United Kingdom	1:40:06
10	Jordi Jiménez	Spain	1:40:08

=== Wheelchair women ===
Wheelchair women's top 10 finishers
Position	Athlete	Nationality	Time
1st place, gold medalist(s)	Manuela Schär	Switzerland	1:44:20
2nd place, silver medalist(s)	Tatyana McFadden	United States	1:48:19
3rd place, bronze medalist(s)	Susannah Scaroni	United States	1:51:37
4	Amanda McGrory	United States	1:56:51
5	Christie Dawes	Australia	2:00:11
6	Vanessa De Souza	Brazil	2:00:15
7	Jenna Fesemyer	United States	2:00:30
8	Shelly Woods	United Kingdom	2:04:44
9	Michelle Wheeler	United States	2:06:05
10	Arielle Rausin	United States	2:06:08

=== Handcycle men ===
Handcycle men's top 5 finishers
Position	Athlete	Nationality	Time
1st place, gold medalist(s)	Omar Duran	United States	1:35:49
2nd place, silver medalist(s)	Ludovic Narce	France	1:35:52
3rd place, bronze medalist(s)	Fabio Faborges	Brazil	1:37:58
4	Helman Roman	United States	1:38:43
5	Joe Pomeroy	United States	1:40:05

=== Handcycle women ===
Handcycle women's top 5 finishers
Position	Athlete	Nationality	Time
1st place, gold medalist(s)	Devann Murphy	United States	2:19:21
2nd place, silver medalist(s)	Corey Peterson	United States	2:27:46
3rd place, bronze medalist(s)	Adessa Ellis	United States	2:34:31
4	Beth Sanden	United States	2:37:45
5	Katherine Valdez	Ecuador	2:40:31
