= Festus Talam =

Kenyan long-distance runner

Personal information
- Nationality: Kenyan
- Born: 20 October 1994 (age 32)

Sport
- Country: Kenya
- Sport: Athletics
- Event: Long-distance running
- Team: NN Running Team

Festus Talam (born October 20, 1994) is a Kenyan long-distance runner.

== Early life ==
Festus Talam was born in Baringo County in Kenya.

== Career ==
Talam made his debut in 2016, when he won the Eindhoven Marathon in October of that year with a time of 2:06:26. He won the Eindhoven Marathon again one year later, in October 2017, with a time of 2:06:13, beating his 2016 record by 13 seconds.

On November 4, 2018, Talam ran the 2018 New York City Marathon, finishing in 8th place with a time of 2:12:40.

On April 15, 2019, Talam ran the 2019 Boston Marathon, finishing 9th with a time of 02:09:25.
