= Lelisa Desisa =

Ethiopian long-distance runner (born 1990)

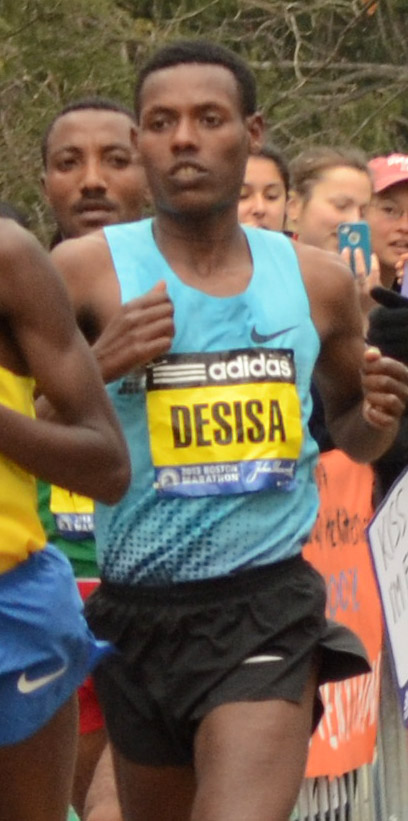
- Desisa at the 2013 Boston Marathon

Personal information
- Nationality: Ethiopian
- Born: 14 January 1990 (age 36) Shewa, Ethiopia

Sport
- Sport: Athletics
- Event: Long-distance running

Achievements and titles
- Personal bests: 10,000 m: 27:11.98 (Hengelo 2012); Half marathon: 59:30 (New Delhi 2011); Marathon: 2:04:45 (Dubai 2013)
Medal record
Men's Athletics
Representing Ethiopia
World Championships
Gold medal – first place	2019 Doha	Marathon
Silver medal – second place	2013 Moscow	Marathon
All-Africa Games
Gold medal – first place	2011 Maputo	Half marathon
African Junior Championships
Gold medal – first place	2009 Bambous	10,000 m
World Marathon Majors
Gold medal – first place	2018 New York	Marathon
Gold medal – first place	2015 Boston	Marathon
Gold medal – first place	2013 Boston	Marathon
Silver medal – second place	2019 Boston	Marathon
Silver medal – second place	2016 Boston	Marathon
Silver medal – second place	2014 New York	Marathon
Bronze medal – third place	2017 New York	Marathon
Bronze medal – third place	2015 New York	Marathon

Lelisa Desisa Benti (born 14 January 1990) is an Ethiopian former long-distance runner who specialised in road running competitions. Desisa gained his first international medal at the 2009 African Junior Athletics Championships, where he took the 10,000 metres gold medal.

== Biography ==
Born in Shewa zone, Oromia regional state of Ethiopia, Desisa made his breakthrough on to the senior international scene at road races in 2010, beginning with a sub-60-minute run for third place at the Zayed International Half Marathon in January. He engaged Wilson Kiprop in a sprint finish at the Paris Half Marathon two months later, ending up in second place. He took to the United States road circuit and was sixth at the Crescent City Classic before taking the runner-up spot at the Cherry Blossom Ten Mile Run behind Stephen Tum. He won the Ottawa 10K in May and led an Ethiopian podium sweep with a win at the Bolder Boulder two days later. That July, he came third in a sprint for the line at the Peachtree Road Race and won the Boilermaker Road Race in Utica in a near course record time. He received his first senior international call-up for the 2010 IAAF World Half Marathon Championships. He came seventh overall, recording a time of 1:01:28 alongside his compatriot Birhanu Bekele to secure the team bronze medal for the Ethiopians. He set a new half marathon best (59:39 minutes) in November at the Delhi Half Marathon and finished one second behind winner Geoffrey Mutai.

He came close to a personal best at the World's Best 10K in February 2011, taking third place in a time of 28:02 minutes. This served as preparation for the City-Pier-City Loop in March, where he came out on top in a five-man sprint finish to record a personal best of 59:37 minutes for the half marathon. In a two-day period, he won the Cooper River Bridge Run and then broke the course record at the Cherry Blossom 10-Miler, improving upon a mark that had stood for 16 years. That June he reached the podium at the World 10K Bangalore, coming third behind Kenyan opposition. He was not selected for the World Championships that year but instead won the half marathon at the 2011 All-Africa Games held that same month. In November, he returned to Delhi and ran a best of 59:30 minutes to win the half marathon race, beating Geoffrey Kipsang by a second.

In June 2012, he ran a personal best of 27:18.17 minutes to win the 10,000 metres in Liège. He was selected as an Olympic squad reserve as a result. A 5000 metres best of 13:22.91 minutes came in June, but ultimately he did not compete at the Olympics. He tried to defend his title at the Delhi Half Marathon but managed only seventh place.

In his debut over the marathon distance, he made one of the fastest-ever debuts by winning the 2013 Dubai Marathon in a time of 2:04:45 hours. He was surprised by the quick time and said he would like to make a world record attempt in the future. Three months later, in the 2013 Boston Marathon, he took the victory in a time of 2:10:22. Desisa was not hurt in the Boston Marathon bombing that occurred after his victory because the bombing took place nearly 3 hours after he passed through the finish line. Desisa later, in a widely acclaimed gesture, returned his 2013 Boston Marathon winner medal back to the city, in order to honor the victims of the bombings.

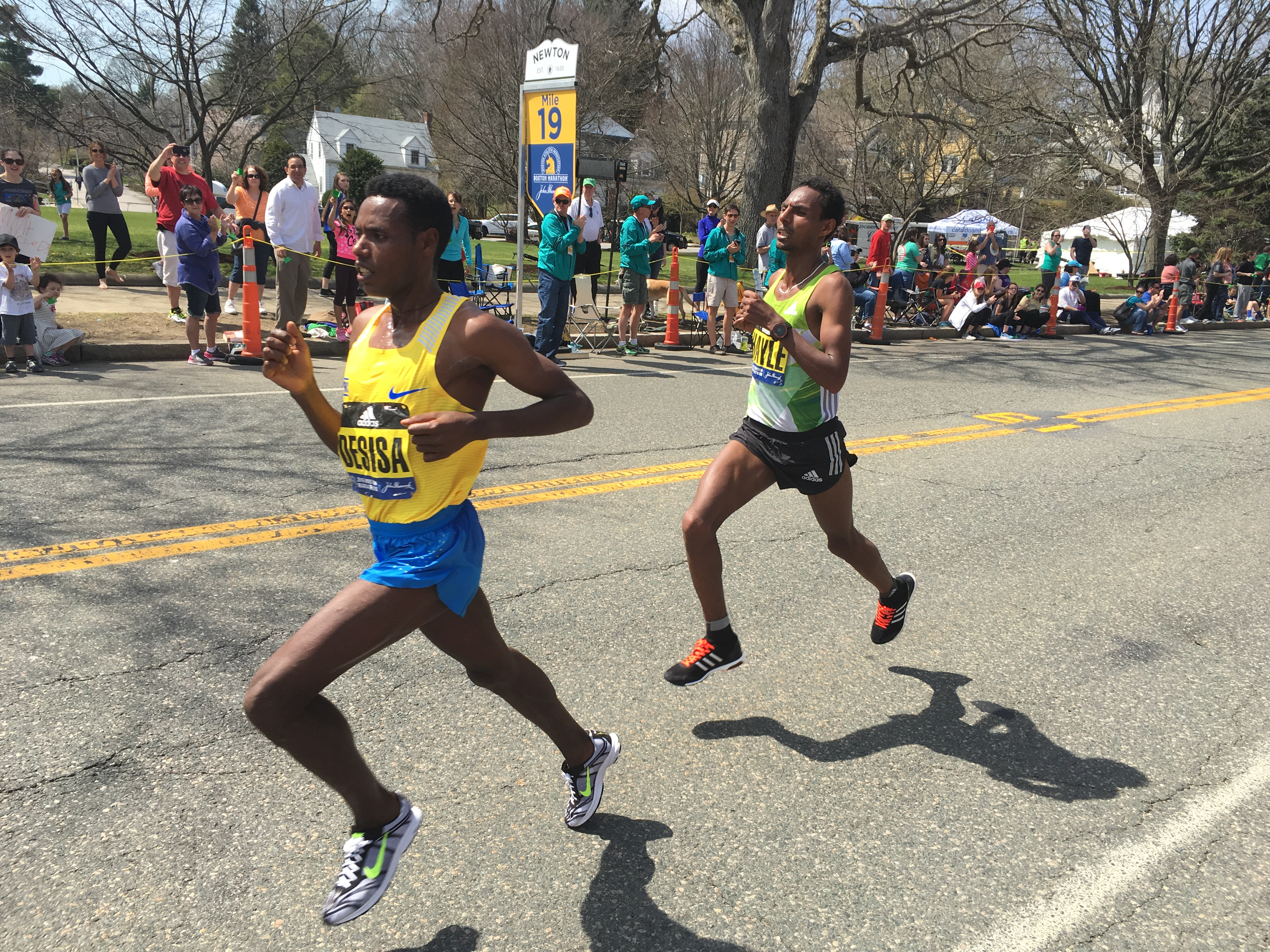
Lelisa Desisa leads Lemi Berhanu Hayle as they pass mile 19 during the 2016 Boston Marathon, but Hayle went on to win; Desisa came in second.

Desisa won the 2015 Boston Marathon on 20 April 2015 with a time of 2:09:17. He came in second in 2016 to fellow Ethiopian Lemi Berhanu Hayle.

On 6 May 2017, Desisa participated in Nike's Breaking2 attempt to run a sub-2-hour marathon. Desisa continued until around kilometer 18, when he began to slow and fell off the projected sub-2-hour pace. Eliud Kipchoge won the race in 2:00:25, Tadese was second in 2:06:51, and Desisa was third with a time of 2:14:10. Although Desisa was way far off from actually breaking the barrier, former athlete and world record holder Paula Radcliffe said: "He is still very young, at only 27... Once he figures it all out and matures a bit more, he will be unstoppable".

Desisa won the 2018 New York City Marathon on 4 November 2018 with a time of 2:05:59.

On 5 October 2019, Desisa became the World champion in men's marathon by running a season's best of 2:10:40 at the 2019 World Athletics Championships in Doha. Less than a month later on 3 November 2019 Lelisa tried to defend his New York City Marathon title. However, he DNFed and Kenya's Geoffrey Kamworor went on to win the race.

Lelisa had one marathon race in 2020, where he finished 35th at the Valencia Marathon in a time of 2:10:44 in December. Kenya's Evans Chebet won the race in a time of 2:03:00.

In 2021 Lelisa took part in the Ethiopian Olympic Marathon Trials in Sebeta, Ethiopia, he finished 2nd in a close race between winner Shura Kitata, and 3rd-place finished Sisay Lemma. Lelisa's performance qualifies him to compete for Ethiopia at the 2020 Tokyo Olympic Games men's marathon.

== Achievements ==
=== World Marathon Majors ===
World Marathon Majors	2013	2014	2015	2016	2017	2018	2019
Tokyo Marathon	–	–	–	–	–	–	–
Boston Marathon	1st	DNF	1st	2nd	–	DNF	2nd
London Marathon	–	–	–	–	–	–	–
Berlin Marathon	–	–	–	–	–	–	–
Chicago Marathon	–	–	–	–	–	–	–
New York City Marathon	–	2nd	3rd	DNF	3rd	1st	DNF

=== Personal bests ===
- 3000 metres – 8:33.72 min (2009)
- 5000 metres – 13:22.91 min (2012)
- 10,000 metres – 27:11.98 min (2012)
- 10 km (road) – 27:57 min (2010)
- Half marathon – 59:30 min (2011)
- Marathon – 2:04:45 min (2013)
