= 2018 London Marathon =

38th annual mass participation marathon race in London

38th London Marathon
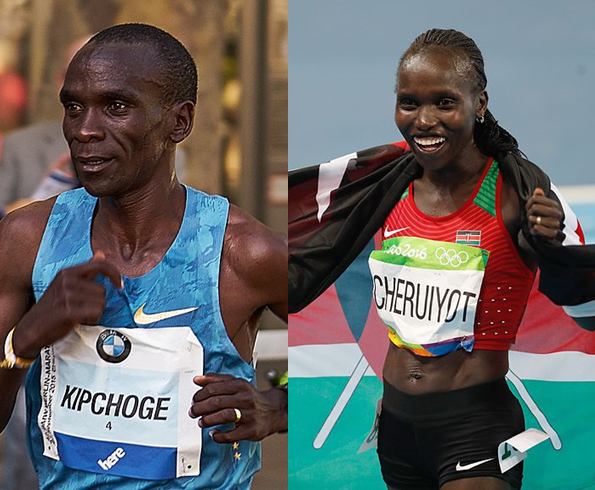
- Eliud Kipchoge and Vivian Cheruiyot
- Venue: London, England
- Date: 22 April 2018

Champions
- Men: Eliud Kipchoge (2:04:17)
- Women: Vivian Cheruiyot (2:18:31)
- Wheelchair men: David Weir (1:31:15)
- Wheelchair women: Madison de Rozario (1:42:58)

The 2018 London Marathon was the 38th running of the annual marathon race in London, England, which took place on Sunday, 22 April. Kenyans Eliud Kipchoge and Vivian Cheruiyot won elite races. In the wheelchair races, Britain's David Weir and Australia's Madison de Rozario topped the podium.

Around 386,050 people applied to enter the race: 54,685 had their applications accepted and 40,926 started the race. These were all record highs for the race. A total of 40,179 runners, 23,701 men and 16,478 women, finished the race. The race was formally started by Queen Elizabeth. It was officially recorded as the hottest London Marathon to date at a peak temperature of 24.1 °C (75.4 °F).

In the under-17 Mini Marathon, the 3-mile able-bodied and wheelchair events were won by Luke Duffy (14:24), Cera Gemmell (16:38), Zhou Zien (13:05) and Kare Adenegan (12:37).

== Overview ==
On 23 March 2018, London Marathon Limited, the organisers of the event announced that the Queen would formally start the race by "step[ping] onto a special podium in front of the Round Tower in the grounds of Windsor Castle to push the start button at 10:00 a.m." The formality marked the anniversary of the 1908 Olympic Marathon, which was started at the same venue by the then Princess Mary, who is The Queen's grandmother. It marked the third time a member of the royal family has started the race, held annually since 1981.

With hot weather forecast, the organisers told racers to lower their performance goals and reconsider fancy dress which could lead to overheating. Extra water and cooling showers were added along the route. On race day, the temperature at St James's Park was recorded as 24.1 °C (75.4 °F), making this the hottest London Marathon ever.

One runner, 29-year-old Masterchef semi-finalist and professional chef Matt Campbell, died after collapsing during the race.

The men's elite race saw the second-ever entry into a competitive marathon by British runner Mo Farah, who, despite a mix-up at a water station, managed to finish third in a new British record. The race winner, Eliud Kipchoge, was on pace for a world record, but slowed in the final stages, finishing with a time of 2:04:17.

Both Mary Keitany and Tirunesh Dibaba went into the women's elite race aiming to set a new world record for a women's marathon with male pacemakers. Keitany led on a world-record pace for much of the race, but faded in the final few miles to eventually finish fifth. Dibaba also struggled as the race progressed and failed to finish. The race winner was Vivian Cheruiyot in a time of 2:18:31.

David Weir won the men's wheelchair event for a record extending eighth time, while Commonwealth Champion Madison de Rozario claimed a surprise first win in London in the women's event.

== Results ==
=== Men ===
Position	Athlete	Nationality	Time
1st place, gold medalist(s)	Eliud Kipchoge	Kenya	2:04:17
2nd place, silver medalist(s)	Shura Kitata Tola	Ethiopia	2:04:49
3rd place, bronze medalist(s)	Mo Farah	United Kingdom	2:06:21
4	Abel Kirui	Kenya	2:07:07
5	Bedan Karoki Muchiri	Kenya	2:08:34
6	Kenenisa Bekele	Ethiopia	2:08:53
7	Lawrence Cherono	Kenya	2:09:25
8	Daniel Wanjiru	Kenya	2:10:35
9	Amanuel Mesel	Eritrea	2:11:52
10	Yohanes Ghebregergis	Eritrea	2:12:09
11	Ihor Olefirenko	Ukraine	2:15:06
12	Stephen Scullion	Ireland	2:15:55
13	Fernando Cabada	United States	2:17:39
14	Jonathan Mellor	United Kingdom	2:17:55
15	Sam Chelanga	United States	2:21:17
16	Tatsunori Hamasaki	Japan	2:25:42
17	Guye Adola	Ethiopia	2:32:35
18	Matt Clowes	United Kingdom	2:43:16
—	Ghirmay Ghebreslassie	Eritrea	DNF

=== Women ===
Position	Athlete	Nationality	Time
1st place, gold medalist(s)	Vivian Cheruiyot	Kenya	2:18:31
2nd place, silver medalist(s)	Brigid Kosgei	Kenya	2:20:13
3rd place, bronze medalist(s)	Tadelech Bekele	Ethiopia	2:21:40
4	Gladys Cherono Kiprono	Kenya	2:24:10
5	Mary Jepkosgei Keitany	Kenya	2:24:27
6	Rose Chelimo	Bahrain	2:26:03
7	Mare Dibaba	Ethiopia	2:27:45
8	Lily Partridge	United Kingdom	2:29:24
9	Tracy Barlow	United Kingdom	2:32:09
10	Stephanie Bruce	United States	2:32:28
11	Rebecca Wade	United States	2:35:01
12	Rebecca Murray	United Kingdom	2:39:37
13	Liz Costello	United States	2:40:04
—	Tirunesh Dibaba	Ethiopia	DNF
—	Tigist Tufa	Ethiopia	DNF

=== Wheelchair men ===
Position	Athlete	Nationality	Time
1st place, gold medalist(s)	David Weir	United Kingdom	1:31:15
2nd place, silver medalist(s)	Marcel Hug	Switzerland	1:31:15
3rd place, bronze medalist(s)	Daniel Romanchuk	United States	1:31:16
4	Josh George	United States	1:31:24
5	Kurt Fearnley	Australia	1:31:24
6	Jordi Madera	Spain	1:31:24
7	Hiroki Nishida	Japan	1:31:25
8	Tomoki Suzuki	Japan	1:31:25
9	Josh Cassidy	Canada	1:31:41
10	Brent Lakatos	Canada	1:33:24

=== Wheelchair women ===
Position	Athlete	Nationality	Time
1st place, gold medalist(s)	Madison de Rozario	Australia	1:42:58
2nd place, silver medalist(s)	Tatyana McFadden	United States	1:42:58
3rd place, bronze medalist(s)	Susannah Scaroni	United States	1:43:00
4	Manuela Schär	Switzerland	1:43:01
5	Amanda McGrory	United States	1:43:04
6	Sandra Graf	Switzerland	1:47:57
7	Jade Jones	United Kingdom	1:50:04
8	Margriet van den Broek	Netherlands	1:51:43
9	Aline Rocha	Brazil	1:51:44
10	Tsubasa Kina	Japan	1:52:19
