= Shura Kitata =

Ethiopian long-distance runner (born 1996)

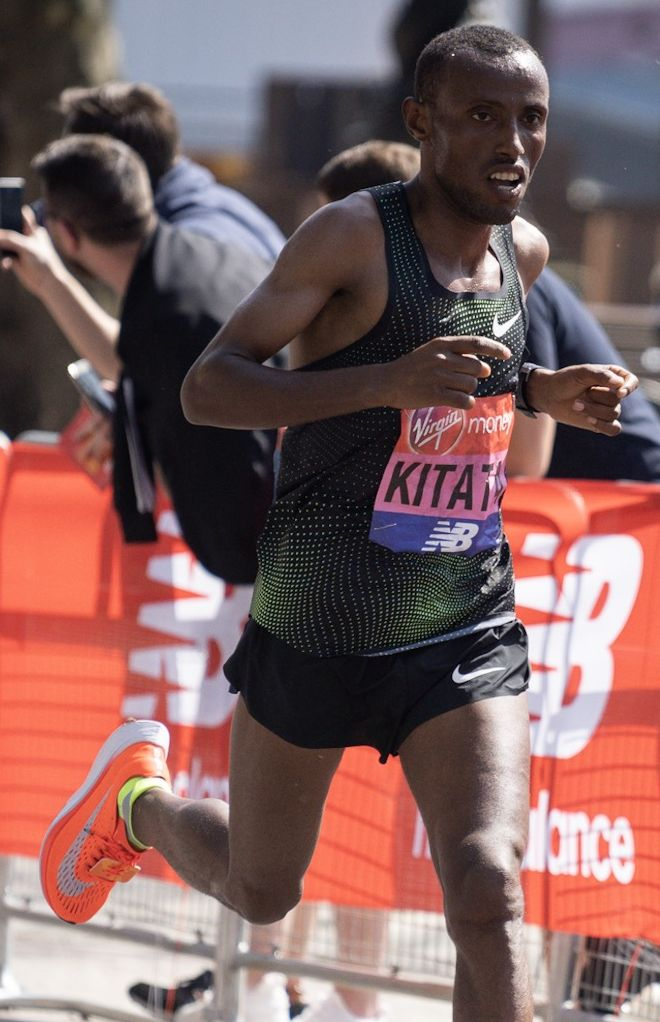
- Shura running in the 2018 London Marathon

Personal information
- Full name: Shura Kitata Tola
- Nationality: Ethiopian
- Born: 9 June 1996 (age 30)

Sport
- Country: Ethiopia
- Sport: Athletics
- Event: Marathon

Achievements and titles
- Personal bests: Marathon: 2:03:59 (Sevilla 2026); Half marathon: 59:47 (Houston 2020)
Medal record
Men's athletics
Representing Ethiopia
World Marathon Majors
Gold medal – first place	2020 London	Marathon
Silver medal – second place	2018 London	Marathon
Silver medal – second place	2018 New York City	Marathon
Silver medal – second place	2022 New York City	Marathon
Bronze medal – third place	2023 New York City	Marathon

Shura Kitata Tola (born 9 June 1996) is an Ethiopian long-distance runner who competes in the marathon and half-marathon. He has raced in several World Marathon Majors, including the 2020 London Marathon, where he won the race in a time of 2:05:41, beating Kenya's Eliud Kipchoge, and the 2018 London Marathon where he finished in second place behind him. His other best performances include the 2017 Rome Marathon and 2017 Frankfurt Marathon victories and second places at the 2018 and 2022 New York City Marathon.

== Early life ==
Shura Kitata was born on 9 June 1996 near the capital of Ethiopia Addis Ababa on his family's farm. He began running in grade school. He wanted to become a doctor or a pilot but had to leave school in order to help his parents on the farm.

== Career ==
In 2015, Shura went to a training camp in Addis Ababa run by Haji Adilo, and three months later, he debuted in the marathon distance at the Shanghai Marathon in China. He finished in a time of 2:08:53 behind Paul Lonyangata and Stephen Mokoka.

The next year, he finished second at the Xiamen International Marathon in China. By the last 10 kilometres (6.2 mi), a small leading group had formed consisting of Shura, Feyisa Bekele, Abdela Godana, Alemu Gemechu, Gebre Mekuant, and Vincent Kipruto. Kipruto and Shura left the others behind; however, with 200m to go, Kipruto put in a strong finish to leave Shura in second place with a time of 2:10:20. In May, he competed in the Ottawa Marathon, finishing second in a time of 2:10:04 behind Dino Sefir. In November, he came second at the Istanbul Marathon in a time of 2:14:06 behind Evans Kiplagat.

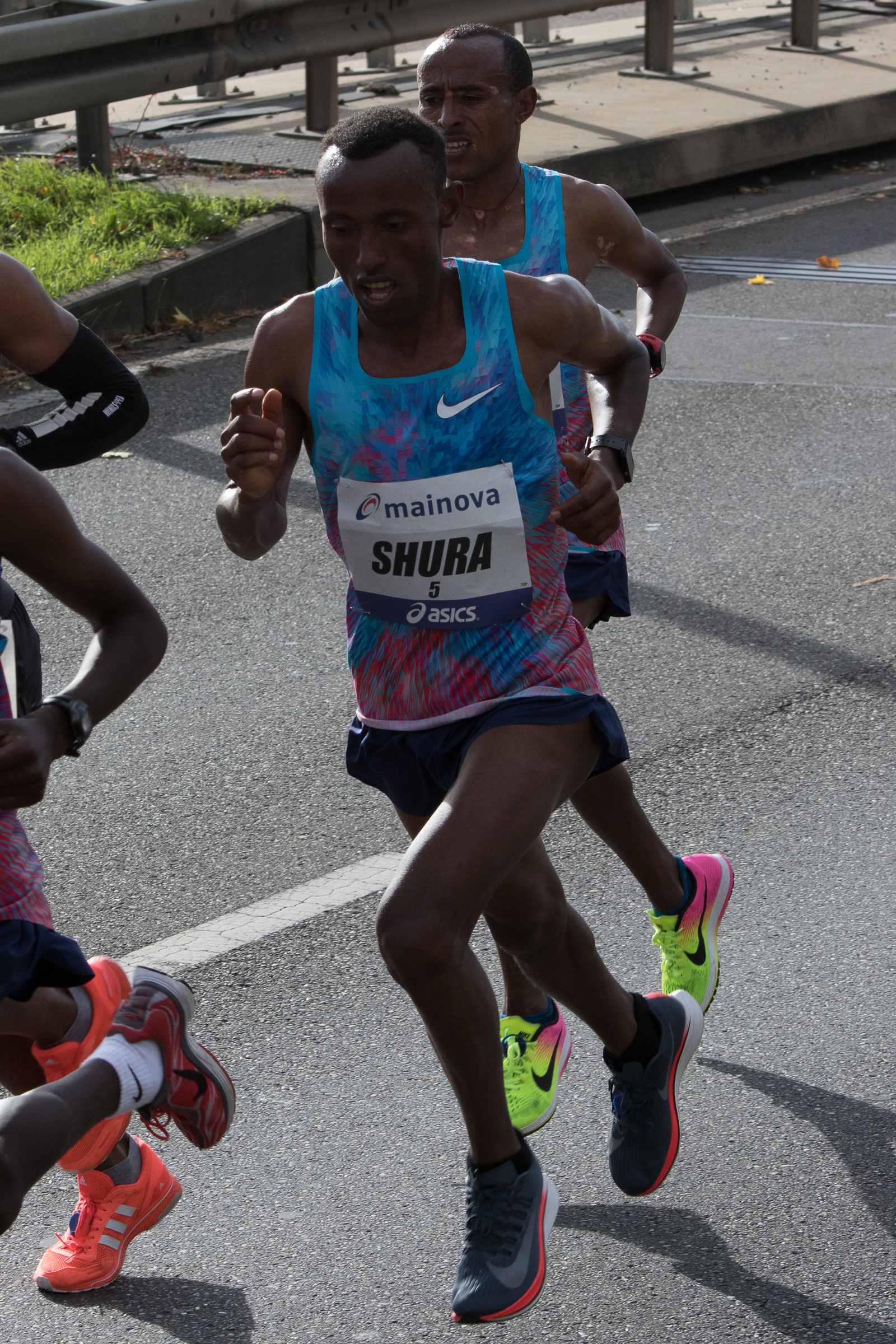
Shura Kitata at the 2017 Frankfurt Marathon

On 2 January 2017, Shura again finished well in the Xiamen International Marathon, finishing third behind Lemi Berhanu and Mosinet Geremew in a time of 2:10:36. He won his first marathon in April when he beat the likes of Werkunesh Seyoum, Solomon Lema, and Dominic Ruto at the Rome Marathon in Italy. He finished with a time of 2:07:30, the second-fastest time on the course. In July, he debuted in the half marathon distance at the Bogotá Half Marathon, finishing third behind Feyisa Lilesa and Peter Kirui in a time of 1:05:04. It was in the second half of 2017 that Shura had his greatest success; he won the Frankfurt Marathon with a personal best of 2:05:50. He left Kelkile Gezahegn and Getu Feleke in the second half of the race.

In 2018, Shura competed at his first World Marathon Majors race at the London Marathon. The field included Eliud Kipchoge, Mo Farah, Kenenisa Bekele, and Daniel Wanjiru. Shura finished in a "surprise" second place behind Kipchoge in a time of 2:04:49. On 16 September, he won the 2018 Rock 'n' Roll Philadelphia Half Marathon by nearly four minutes in a time of 59:16. A month later, Shura competed in another World Marathon Major, the New York City Marathon. He came second behind Lelisa Desisa by just two seconds to set a time of 2:06:01, the third fastest time on the course. He beat former half marathon world record holder Geoffrey Kamworor from Kenya.

In 2019, Shura first raced at the Houston Half Marathon on 19 January, winning the event in a time of 1:00:11. He said it was a "real hard race" with "stiff competition" having finished just three seconds ahead of second-placed Jemal Yimer. Shura competed in two World Marathon Majors in 2019; the New York City Marathon and the London Marathon. In London, on 28 April, Kipchoge won, Mosinet Geremew came second, Mule Wasihun came third, and Shura came fourth in a time of 2:05:01, about fourteen minutes after the lead group dropped him. In New York, he finished fifth in a time of 2:10:39.

Due to the COVID-19 pandemic, the 2020 London Marathon was postponed and took place on 4 October. The race didn't take the usual course through the city, but instead consisted of 19.8 laps around St James's Park, with no spectators and only elite runners allowed to participate. A few days before the race, Kenenisa Bekele pulled out due to calf problems, meaning Kipchoge was the "overwhelming favourite". Having struggled with hunger at the 2019 London Marathon, Shura ate soup, bread, eggs and yoghurt for breakfast to ensure he had enough energy. The race began at a slow pace, passing halfway in 1:02:54. With 4 miles (6.4 km) left, there were still nine in the lead group but at 24 miles (39 km) into the race, Kipchoge was dropped from the group. Shura was involved in a sprint finish down The Mall and managed to beat Vincent Kipchumba to win the race in a time of 2:05:41. Kipchoge later revealed that a "blocked right ear" had affected his performance, having finished eighth in a time of 2:06:49. Shura said the race was "not special because I beat Eliud Kipchoge, it was special because I worked hard" and also pointed out that "everyone was focussed on two athletes – Kipchoge and Bekele – and I didn't get any attention".

Shura qualified for the marathon at the delayed 2020 Tokyo Olympics in 2021, with his strong finish in London giving hopes of a medal, but he had to withdraw shortly before the 10 kilometer mark with an apparent hamstring injury.

In November 2022, he placed second at the New York City Marathon in a time of 2:08:54 behind only Evans Chebet (2:08:41).

== Competition record ==
Representing Ethiopia
Year	Competition	Venue	Position	Event	Notes
2015	Shanghai Marathon	Shanghai, China	3rd	Marathon	2:08:53
2016	Xiamen International Marathon	Xiamen, China	2nd	Marathon	2:10:20
2016	Ottawa Marathon	Ottawa, Canada	2nd	Marathon	2:10:04
2016	Istanbul Marathon	Istanbul, Turkey	2nd	Marathon	2:14:08
2017	Xiamen International Marathon	Xiamen, China	3rd	Marathon	2:10:36
2017	Rome Marathon	Rome, Italy	1st	Marathon	2:07:28
2017	Bogotá Half Marathon	Bogotá, Colombia	3rd	Half marathon	1:05:04
2017	Frankfurt Marathon	Frankfurt, Germany	1st	Marathon	2:05:50
2018	London Marathon	London, United Kingdom	2nd	Marathon	2:04:49
2018	Rock 'n' Roll Philadelphia Half Marathon	Philadelphia, PA, United States	1st	Half marathon	59:16
2018	New York City Marathon	New York, NY, United States	2nd	Marathon	2:06:01
2019	Houston Half Marathon	Houston, TX, United States	1st	Half marathon	1:00:11
2019	London Marathon	London, United Kingdom	4th	Marathon	2:05:01
2019	New York City Marathon	New York, NY, United States	5th	Marathon	2:10:39
2020	Houston Half Marathon	Houston, TX, United States	8th	Half marathon	59:47
2020	London Marathon	London, United Kingdom	1st	Marathon	2:05:41
2021	Olympic Games	Sapporo, Japan	–	Marathon	DNF
2021	London Marathon	London, United Kingdom	6th	Marathon	2:07:51
2022	Tokyo Marathon	Tokyo, Japan	5th	Marathon	2:06:12
2022	New York City Marathon	New York, NY, United States	2nd	Marathon	2:08:54
