= Hiroyuki Yamamoto (wheelchair racer) =

Japanese wheelchair athlete

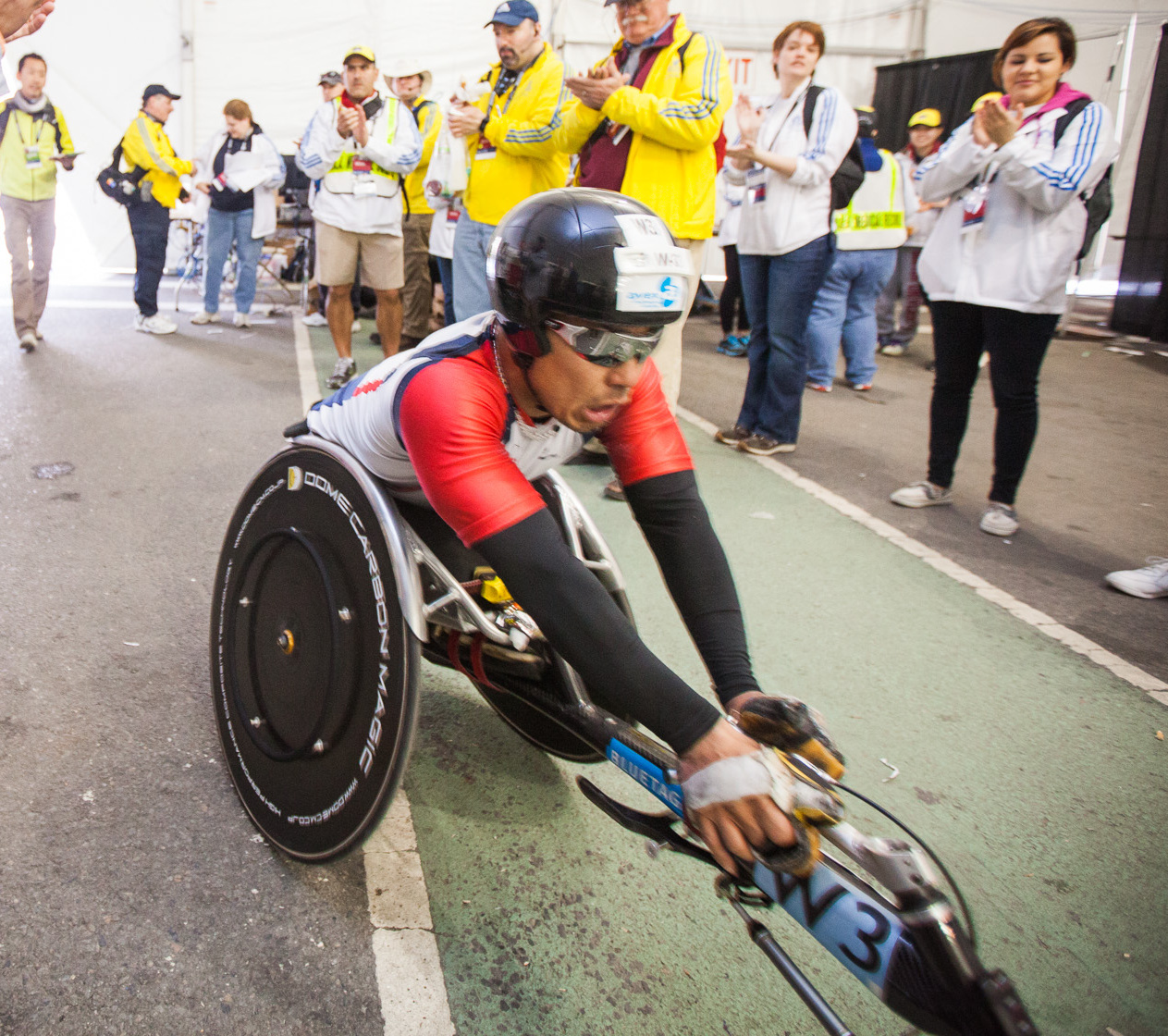
- Yamamoto after winning the 2013 Boston Marathon

Personal information
- Born: 31 May 1966 (age 59)

Sport
- Country: Japan
- Sport: Wheelchair racing
- Disability class: T54

Hiroyuki Yamamoto (山本 浩之, Yamamoto Hiroyuki; born 31 May 1966) is a Japanese wheelchair athlete.

== Career ==
Hokinoue's career began at the age of 30, ten years after he sustained a spinal cord injury in a motorcycle accident.

His first major championship marathon was at the 2008 Summer Paralympics, where he placed 6th with a time of 1:23:22. His marathon best is 1:23:16, which he attained at the 2011 Seoul International Marathon.

He won the 2013 Boston Marathon's Wheelchair Men's portion, with a time of 1:25:33.

== Personal life ==
Yamamoto is married, with whom he had a son who died in 2011. Yamamoto's nickname is "Hiro-san".
