= Geoffrey Kamworor =

Kenyan long-distance runner (born 1992)

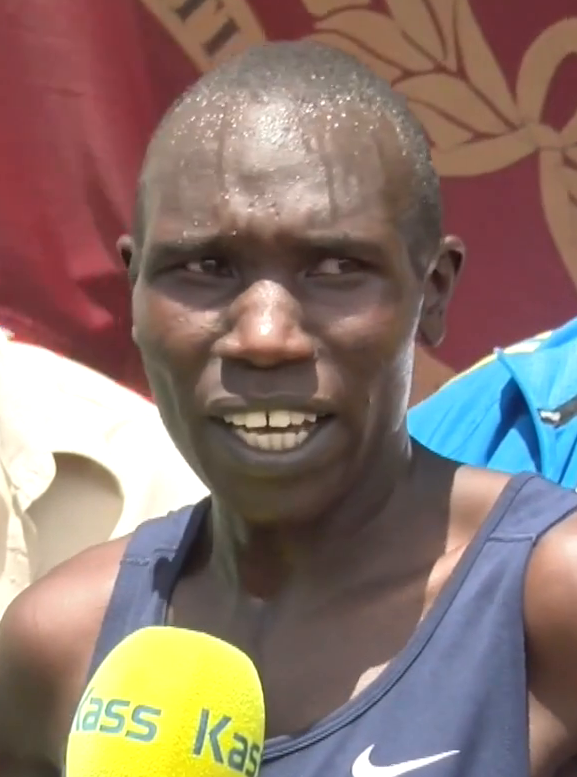
- Kamworor at the 2018 Kenyan Cross Country Championships

Personal information
- Born: 22 November 1992 (age 33) Chepsamo, Chepkorio, Rift Valley Province, Kenya
- Height: 1.72 m (5 ft 8 in)
- Weight: 58 kg (128 lb)

Sport
- Country: Kenya
- Sport: Sport of athletics
- Event: Long-distance running
- Team: NN Running Team
- Coached by: Patrick Sang

Achievements and titles
- Olympic finals: 2016 Rio de Janeiro; 10,000 m, 11th
- World finals: 2015 Beijing; 10,000 m, Silver; 2017 London; 10,000 m, 6th
- Personal bests: 5000 m: 12:59.98 (Eugene 2016); 10,000 m: 26:52.65 (Eugene 2015); Road; 10 km: 27:44 (Bangalore 2014); Half marathon: 58:01 (Copenhagen 2019); Marathon: 2:04:23 (London 2023)
Medal record
Men's athletics
Representing Kenya
World Championships
Silver medal – second place	2015 Beijing	10,000 m
World Half Marathon Championships
Gold medal – first place	2014 Copenhagen	Individual
Gold medal – first place	2016 Cardiff	Individual
Gold medal – first place	2016 Cardiff	Team
Gold medal – first place	2018 Valencia	Individual
Silver medal – second place	2014 Copenhagen	Team
Silver medal – second place	2018 Valencia	Team
World Marathon Majors
Gold medal – first place	2017 New York	Marathon
Gold medal – first place	2019 New York	Marathon
Silver medal – second place	2015 New York	Marathon
Silver medal – second place	2023 London	Marathon
Bronze medal – third place	2012 Berlin	Marathon
Bronze medal – third place	2013 Berlin	Marathon
Bronze medal – third place	2018 New York	Marathon
World Cross Country Championships
Gold medal – first place	2011 Punta Umbria	Junior race
Gold medal – first place	2011 Punta Umbria	Junior team
Gold medal – first place	2015 Guiyang	Senior race
Gold medal – first place	2017 Kampala	Senior race
Gold medal – first place	2023 Bathurst	Senior team
Silver medal – second place	2015 Guiyang	Senior team
Silver medal – second place	2017 Kampala	Senior team
Silver medal – second place	2019 Aarhus	Senior team
Bronze medal – third place	2019 Aarhus	Senior race

Geoffrey Kipsang Kamworor (born 22 November 1992) is a Kenyan professional long-distance runner. He won the silver medal in the 10,000 metres at the 2015 World Championships in Athletics. Kamworor claimed victories at the World Half Marathon Championships three times in a row from 2014 to 2018. He took individual titles at the World Cross Country Championships in 2015 and 2017, and finished third in 2019. He won his first World Marathon Major at the 2017 New York City Marathon and regained his title in 2019, after a second-place finish in 2015. Kamworor also placed second at the 2023 London Marathon and earned three other podium finishes at a World Marathon Majors.

== Education and early career ==
Kamworor, a former police officer, has started running while a student at the Lelboinet Secondary School in Keiyo South before graduating from Chepsamo Primary School.

At age 18, he was the 2011 World Junior Cross Country champion. Kamworor is the former half marathon world record holder, having won the Copenhagen Half Marathon with a time of 58:01 in September 2019. His record stood until December 2020 when it was bested by Kibiwott Kandie at the 2020 Valencia Half Marathon.

== Later career ==
Geoffrey was raised in the village of Chepkorio in Kenya's Rift Valley Province, and first competed abroad in 2010, when he travelled to Finland and set track bests of 3:48.15 minutes for the 1500 metres and 7:54.15 minutes over 3000 metres. The following year he took to the Kenya cross country circuit and won at the Discovery Kenya Cross Country in Eldoret, defeating Essa Ismail Rashed. At the Kenyan Cross Country Championships a month later, he ran in the junior section and finished in fourth, which was enough to earn him a place on the team for the 2011 IAAF World Cross Country Championships. The world competition proved to be a pivotal moment for Kamworor's career, although it was his teammate Isiah Koech who was the pre-race favourite. The Kenyans were not given any team instructions and Kamworor reacted by taking the lead immediately with a very fast start. He never slipped out of the lead and out ran the field on the final lap to take the world junior title.

A month after his cross country victory, he entered the Berlin Half Marathon and won in a time of 1:00:38 hours. In June he competed in the 2011 IAAF Diamond League circuit: he set a 5000 metres best of 13:12.23 minutes at the Adidas Grand Prix in New York, then improved his 10,000 metres time to 27:06.35 minutes at the Prefontaine Classic. He knocked over half a minute off his half marathon best to win the Lille Half Marathon that September. Kamworor was employed as a pacemaker for the 2011 Berlin Marathon and his work resulted in a new world record for Patrick Makau. In his final outing of the year he ended the Delhi Half Marathon as runner-up to Lelisa Desisa after a sprint finish, although his time of 59:31 minutes made him the seventh fastest over the distance that year.

Kamworor marked his entrance into the senior cross country ranks with a win at the 2012 Cross Internacional de Itálica in Seville. He was the runner-up at the Elgoibar Cross Country behind Paul Tanui the following week. He set a half marathon best at the CPC Loop Den Haag in March, recording a time of 59:26 minutes for fourth place in a high calibre competition. He was enlisted to pace the Rotterdam Marathon and led the runners quicker than the world record pace up to 30 km. He won the World 10K Bangalore title, beating a large field of prominent runners. His marathon debut, not as a pacemaker, came in September, where he ran a fast time of 2:06:12 hours to claim third place at the 2012 Berlin Marathon.

In the 2013 season he ran a series of half and full marathons. He won the Ras Al Khaimah Half Marathon with a time of 58:54, a new personal best and just two seconds outside the course record. He was the winner of the Bogotá Half Marathon in July and was runner-up to Atsedu Tsegay at the Delhi Half Marathon. He placed fourth at the Rotterdam Marathon (2:09:12 hours) and his best performance that year was a run of 2:06:26 hours for third at the 2013 Berlin Marathon.

In 2014, Kamworor placed sixth at the Tokyo marathon But in March he did win the world half Marathon Championships, defeating five time world half Marathon Championships winner Zersenay Tadese.

In 2015, he started off his year by winning the world cross country championships, beating Muktha of Ethiopia. He then won the Prefontaine classic 10k, the Kenyan National thousand and 10 K and the world championship silver medal in the 10,000 m.

Kamworor won the 2017 New York City Marathon with a time of 2:10:53. He beat fellow Kenyan, Wilson Kipsang, who placed second, just three seconds behind him.

In 2018, he won his third straight half marathon world championship in Valencia in 1:00:02. Also in 2018 Kamworor placed third in the 2018 New York City Marathon with a time of 2:06:26 behind the first and second place Ethiopian runners Lelisa Desisa and Shura Kitata.

Kamworor won the Copenhagen Half Marathon on 15 September 2019 in a world record time of 58:01. In November, he won the 2019 New York City Marathon with a time of 2:08:13, his second time winning the race in three years.

On June 27, 2020, Kamworor was hit by a motorcycle while out on a daily run resulting in a tibia fracture that required surgery. In January 2021, he ran his first race since the accident, winning the 2021 Kenya Police Cross Country Championship 10k in a time of 29:22. On June 18, 2021, he secured his spot on the Kenyan 2020 Olympic 10000 metre team by winning at the Kenyan trials in Kasarani in 27:01.

Kamworor was set to compete in the Tokyo Olympics but had to pull out of the competition due to an ankle injury.

== Achievements ==
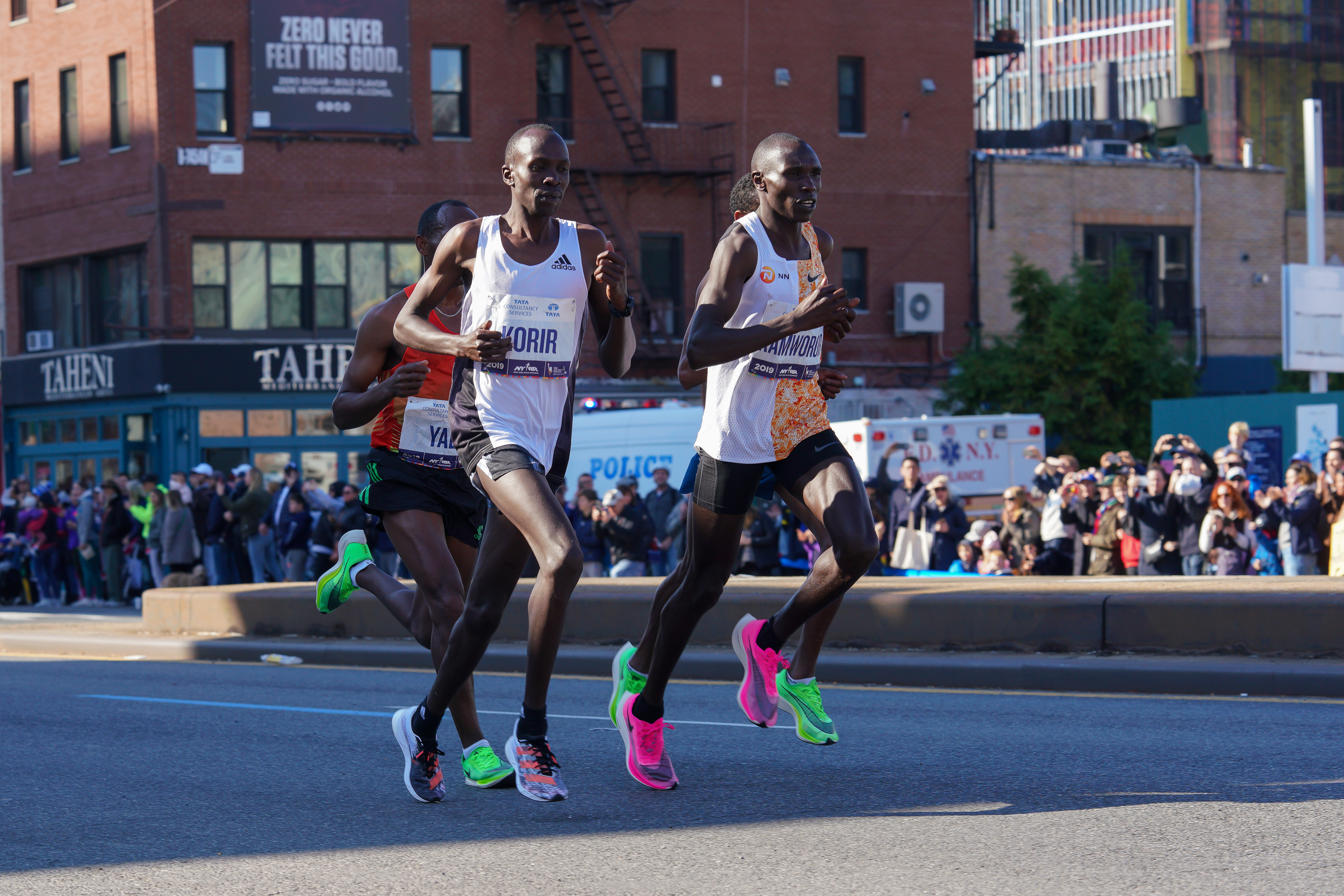
Kamworor (R) races at the 2019 New York City Marathon.

=== International competitions ===
Year	Competition	Venue	Position	Event	Result
Representing Kenya
2011	World Cross Country Championships	Punta Umbria, Spain	1st	Junior race	22:21
2011	World Cross Country Championships	Punta Umbria, Spain	1st	Junior team	20 pts
2014	World Half Marathon Championships	Copenhagen, Denmark	1st	Half marathon	59:08
2014	World Half Marathon Championships	Copenhagen, Denmark	2nd	Team	2:59:38
2015	World Cross Country Championships	Guiyang, China	1st	Senior race	34:52
2015	World Cross Country Championships	Guiyang, China	2nd	Senior team	20 pts
2015	World Championships	Beijing, China	2nd	10,000 m	27:01.76
2016	World Half Marathon Championships	Cardiff, United Kingdom	1st	Half marathon	59:10
2016	World Half Marathon Championships	Cardiff, United Kingdom	1st	Team	2:58:58
2016	Olympic Games	Rio de Janeiro, Brazil	11th	10,000 m	27:31.94
2017	World Cross Country Championships	Kampala, Uganda	1st	Senior race	28:24
2017	World Cross Country Championships	Kampala, Uganda	2nd	Senior team	22 pts
2017	World Championships	London, United Kingdom	6th	10,000 m	26:57.77
2018	World Half Marathon Championships	Valencia, Spain	1st	Half marathon	60:02
2018	World Half Marathon Championships	Valencia, Spain	2nd	Team	3:02:40
2019	World Cross Country Championships	Aarhus, Denmark	3rd	Senior race	31:55
2019	World Cross Country Championships	Aarhus, Denmark	2nd	Senior team	43 pts
2022	World Championships	Eugene, OR, United States	5th	Marathon	2:07:14
2023	World Cross Country Championships	Bathurst, Australia	4th	Senior race	29:37
2023	World Cross Country Championships	Bathurst, Australia	1st	Senior team	22 pts
World Marathon Majors
2012	Berlin Marathon	Berlin, Germany	3rd	Marathon	2:06:12
2013	Berlin Marathon	Berlin, Germany	3rd	Marathon	2:06:26
2014	Tokyo Marathon	Tokyo, Japan	6th	Marathon	2:07:37
2014	Berlin Marathon	Berlin, Germany	4th	Marathon	2:06:39
2015	New York City Marathon	New York, NY, United States	2nd	Marathon	2:10:48
2017	New York City Marathon	New York, NY, United States	1st	Marathon	2:10:53
2018	New York City Marathon	New York, NY, United States	3rd	Marathon	2:06:26
2019	New York City Marathon	New York, NY, United States	1st	Marathon	2:08:13
2023	London Marathon	London, United Kingdom	2nd	Marathon	2:04:23

=== Personal bests ===
- 5000 metres – 12:59.98 (Eugene, OR 2016)
- 10,000 metres – 26:52.65 (Eugene, OR 2015)

Road

- 10 kilometres – 27:44 (Bangalore 2014)
- Half marathon – 58:01 (Copenhagen 2019) former World record
- Marathon – 2:04:23 (London 2023)

Records
Preceded by (Eritrea) Zersenay Tadese	Men's half marathon world record holder 15 September 2019 – 6 December 2020	Succeeded by (Kenya) Kibiwott Kandie
