= 2013 Boston Marathon =

Footrace in Boston, Massachusetts, USA

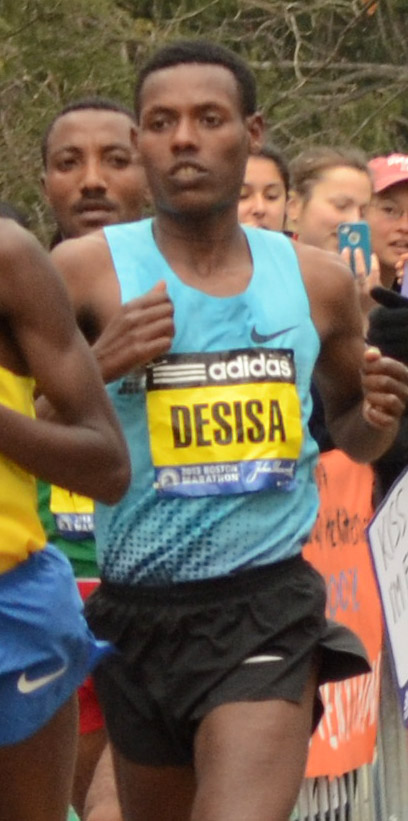
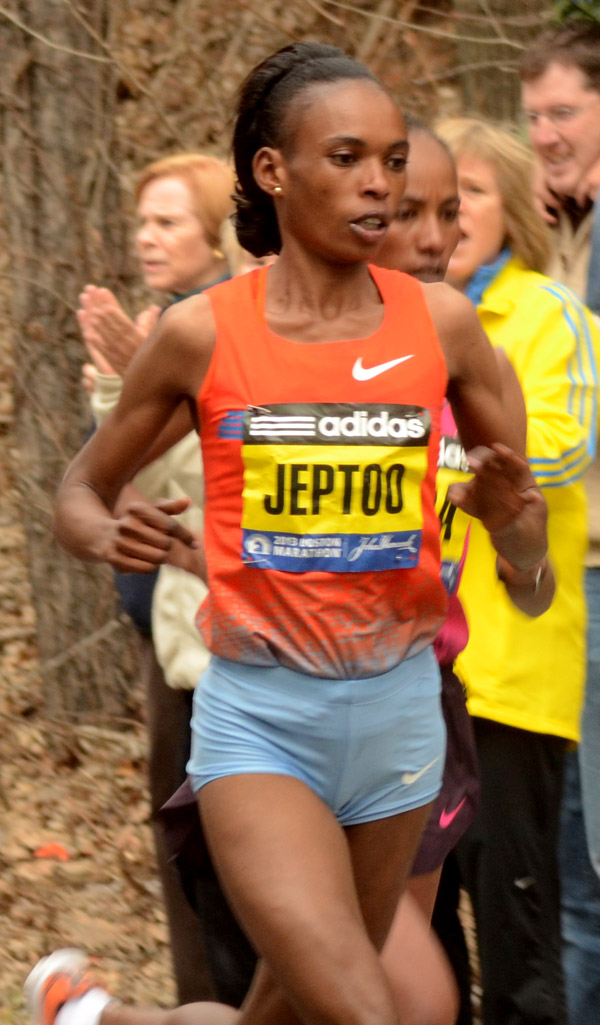
- Lelisa Desisa Benti, male winner and Rita Jeptoo, female winner of the 2013 Boston Marathon, near the race's half-way point at the Wellesley College "Scream Tunnel".
- Venue: Boston, Massachusetts
- Dates: April 15

Champions
- Men: Lelisa Desisa (2:10:22)
- Women: Rita Jeptoo (2:26:25)
- Wheelchair men: Hiroyuki Yamamoto (1:25:33)
- Wheelchair women: Tatyana McFadden (1:45:25)

The 2013 Boston Marathon was the 117th running of the annual marathon race in Boston, United States, which took place on April 15, 2013. Organized by the Boston Athletic Association (B.A.A.), it hosted the second of the World Marathon Majors to be held in 2013 with over 23,000 runners participating. Lelisa Desisa won the men's race with a time of 2:10:22, and Rita Jeptoo won the women's with a time of 2:26:25. Hiroyuki Yamamoto won the men's wheelchair race in 1:25:32 and Tatyana McFadden won the women's in 1:45:25.

The event was disrupted and largely overshadowed by a terrorist attack in which two consecutive explosions, the first being at 14:49:43 EDT, the second being 14:49:56 EDT, on the sidewalk, near the finish line at 671 and 755 Boylston Street, killed three spectators named Krystle Marie Campbell, Lu Lingzi, and Martin William Richard, and injured roughly 281 people. The competition was suspended and many runners were unable to participate in the remainder of the competition. The attack received widespread international media attention.

== Course ==
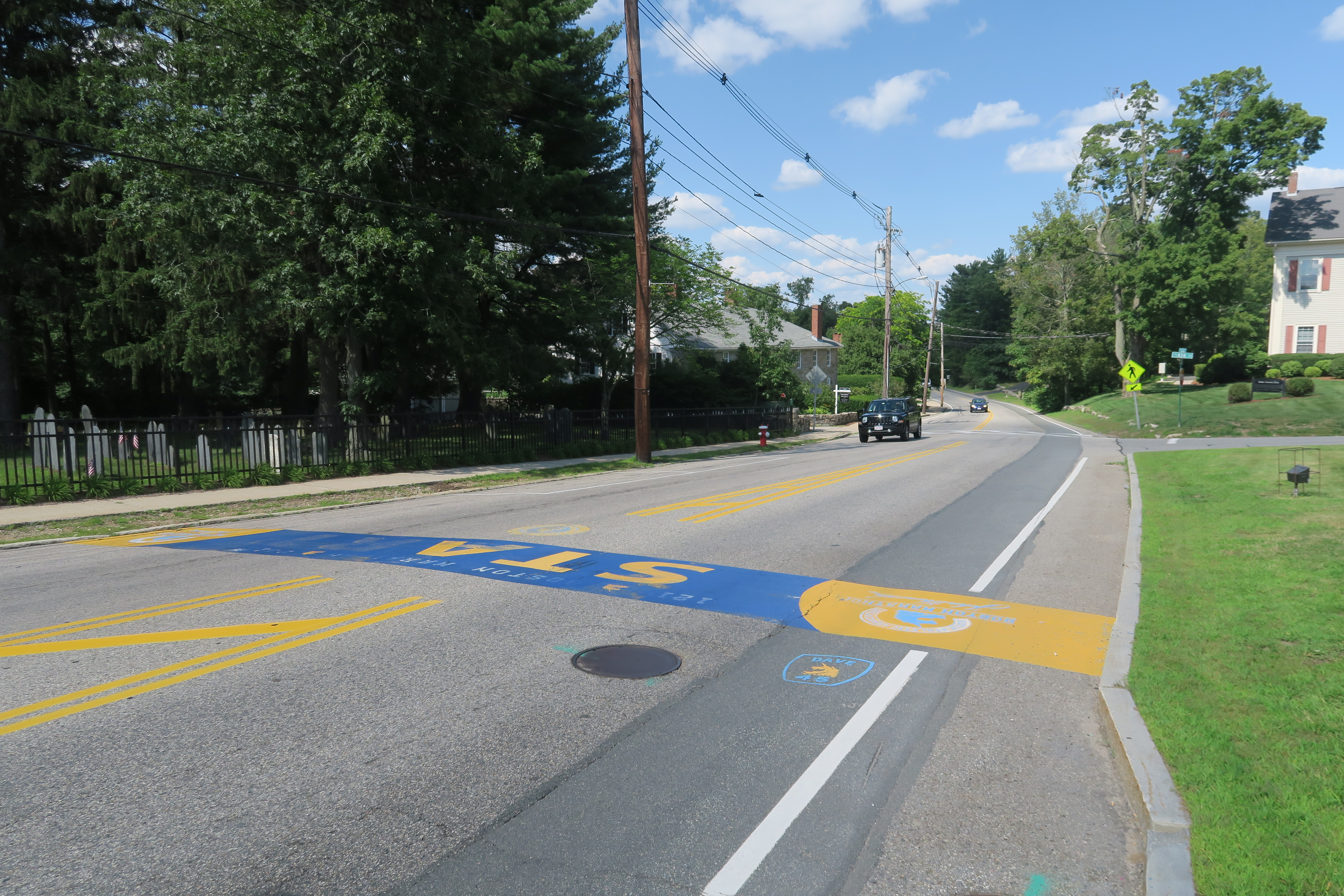
The starting line in Hopkinton

The marathon distance is officially 42.195 kilometres (26.219 mi) long as sanctioned by World Athletics (IAAF). The Boston Marathon course has been the same since the inaugural race in 1897. The start is in the town of Hopkinton and the first 6 miles (9.7 km) are downhill through Ashland and into the city of Framingham. Leaving Framingham, the runners enter the town of Natick, before passing through the 'Scream Tunnel' at mile 12. This area is filled with a 'tunnel' of young women from the nearby Wellesley College who request kisses from runners, a tradition that has been in place for more than 100 years. At mile 15, there is a large downhill section, followed by a 0.75-mile (1.21 km) climb at mile 16 crossing the Yankee Division Highway. The runners take a right turn onto Commonwealth Avenue in Newton before starting the first of the four 'Newton Hills'.

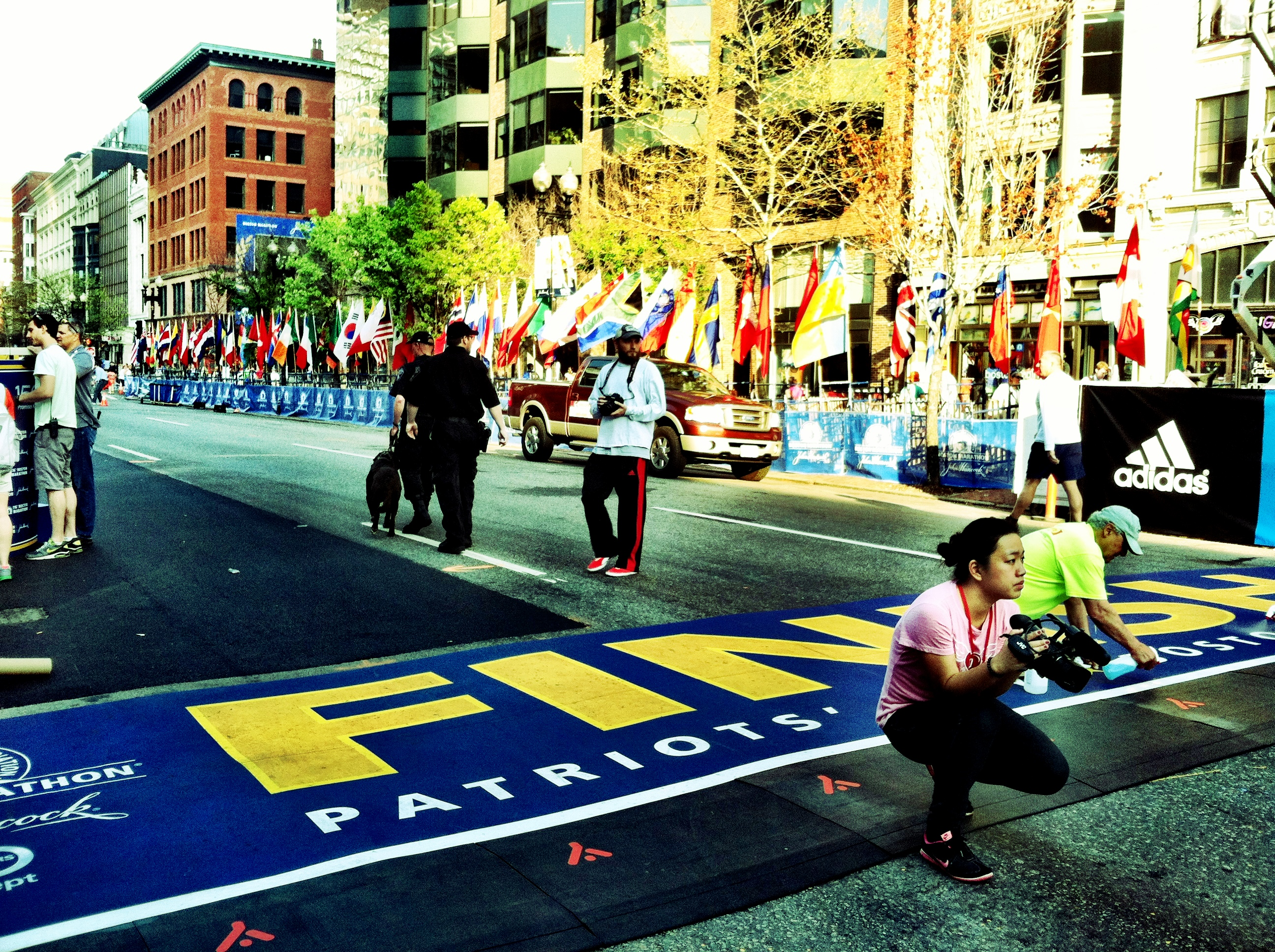
The 2012 finish line on Boylston Street

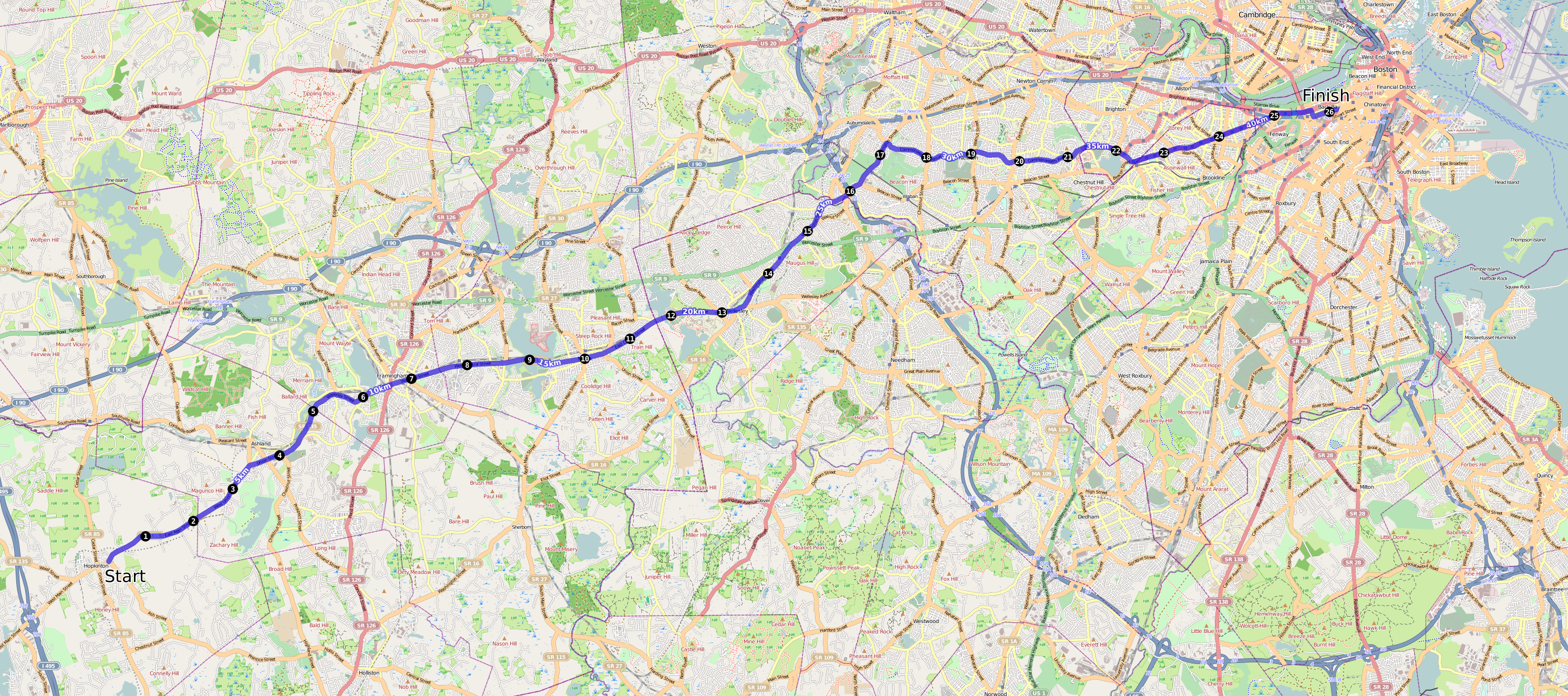
Course map

The first hill is a steep 1,200-yard (1,100 m) climb, the second about 0.25 miles (0.40 km), the third a steep 800 yards (730 m) before the runners start the infamous 'Heartbreak Hill' at just after mile 20. At half a mile long and with a 3.3% percent incline, it is not especially difficult, but due to the hill being 20 miles (32 km) into the race, it is still feared as the runners' legs are usually tired at this point. The course is mostly downhill to the end, and passes through Boston College before entering Cleveland Circle then Kenmore Square where there are many spectators. The final mile has a slight incline, before it flattens off to finish on Boylston Street.

== Field ==
The fastest competitor in the women's race was Meseret Hailu who had run 2:21:09 to win the 2012 Amsterdam Marathon and 1:08:55 to win the 2012 IAAF World Half Marathon Championships. 2011 Frankfurt Marathon winner Mamitu Daska, runner-up at the 2012 Berlin Marathon Tirfi Tsegaye, and winner of the 2012 Chicago Marathon Rita Jeptoo were also racing. 2012 champion Sharon Cherop returned to defend her title. Reigning wheelchair champions Joshua Cassidy and Shirley Reilly returned to defend their titles in their respective categories.

Wesley Korir returned to defend his 2012 title in the men's race. He had most recently finished fifth in the 2012 Chicago Marathon. Also competing were 2013 Dubai Marathon winner Lelisa Desisa, 2012 Boston Marathon runner-up Levy Matebo Omari, 2011 Los Angeles Marathon winner Markos Geneti, 2011 New York City Marathon winner Gebre Gebremariam, and 2010 Boston Marathon winner Robert Kiprono Cheruiyot. In total, there were nine sub-2:07 runners in the field.

The wheelchair race began at 9:17 EDT (UTC−4), the women's at 9:32 EDT and the men's at 10:00 EDT. In the men's and women's races, the winner received $150,000, with second and third receiving $75,000 and $40,000, respectively.

== Race summary ==
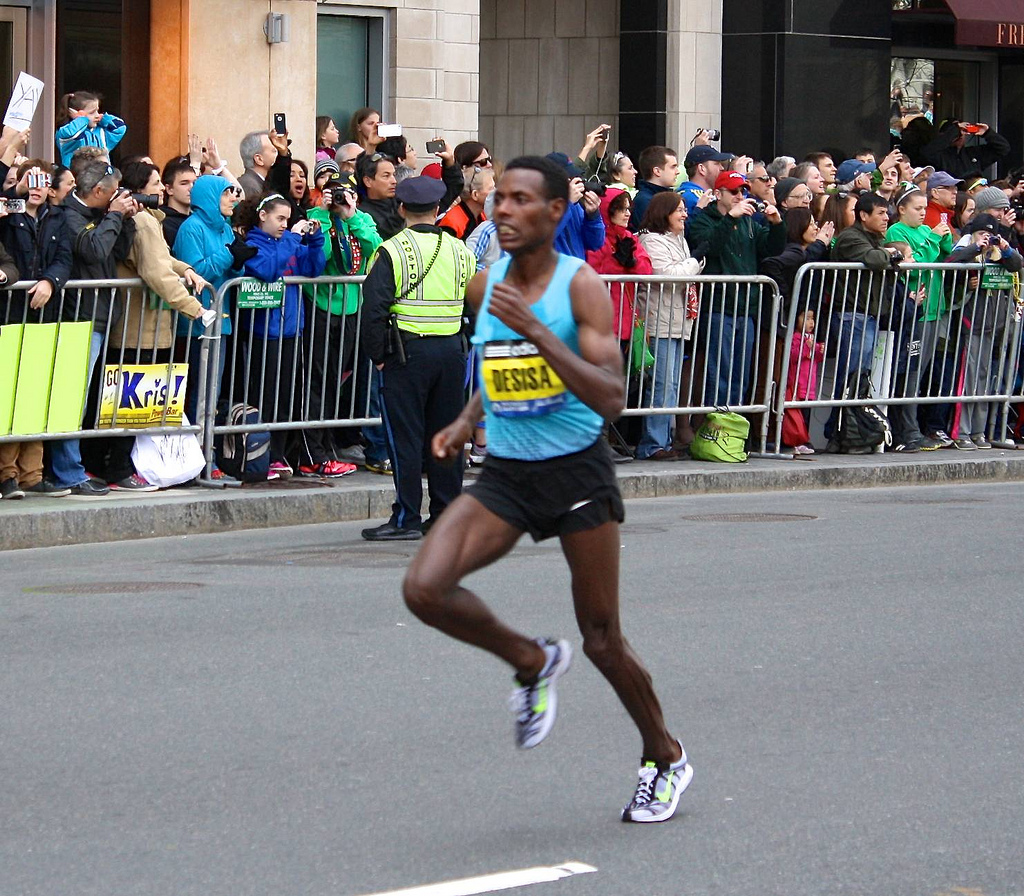
Lelisa Desisa during the race

After 26 seconds of silence to honor the victims of the Sandy Hook Elementary School shooting, the marathon got underway with 53 wheelchair competitors leaving Hopkinton. The temperature at start time was in the upper 40 °F (8–10 °C) range and rose to 54 °F (12 °C) at the finish. Hiroyuki Yamamoto of Japan aimed to make a move at the 5-kilometre (3.1 mi) mark, and at 8 miles (13 km) into the race had built up a lead of 200 yards (180 m), which he held until the end to win in a time of 1:25:32. This was the first time that Yamamoto, aged 46, had competed in the Boston Marathon. He beat South African Ernst Van Dyk by 39 seconds. In the women's wheelchair race, Tatyana McFadden, who was also competing in the race for the first time, won in a time of 1:45:25.

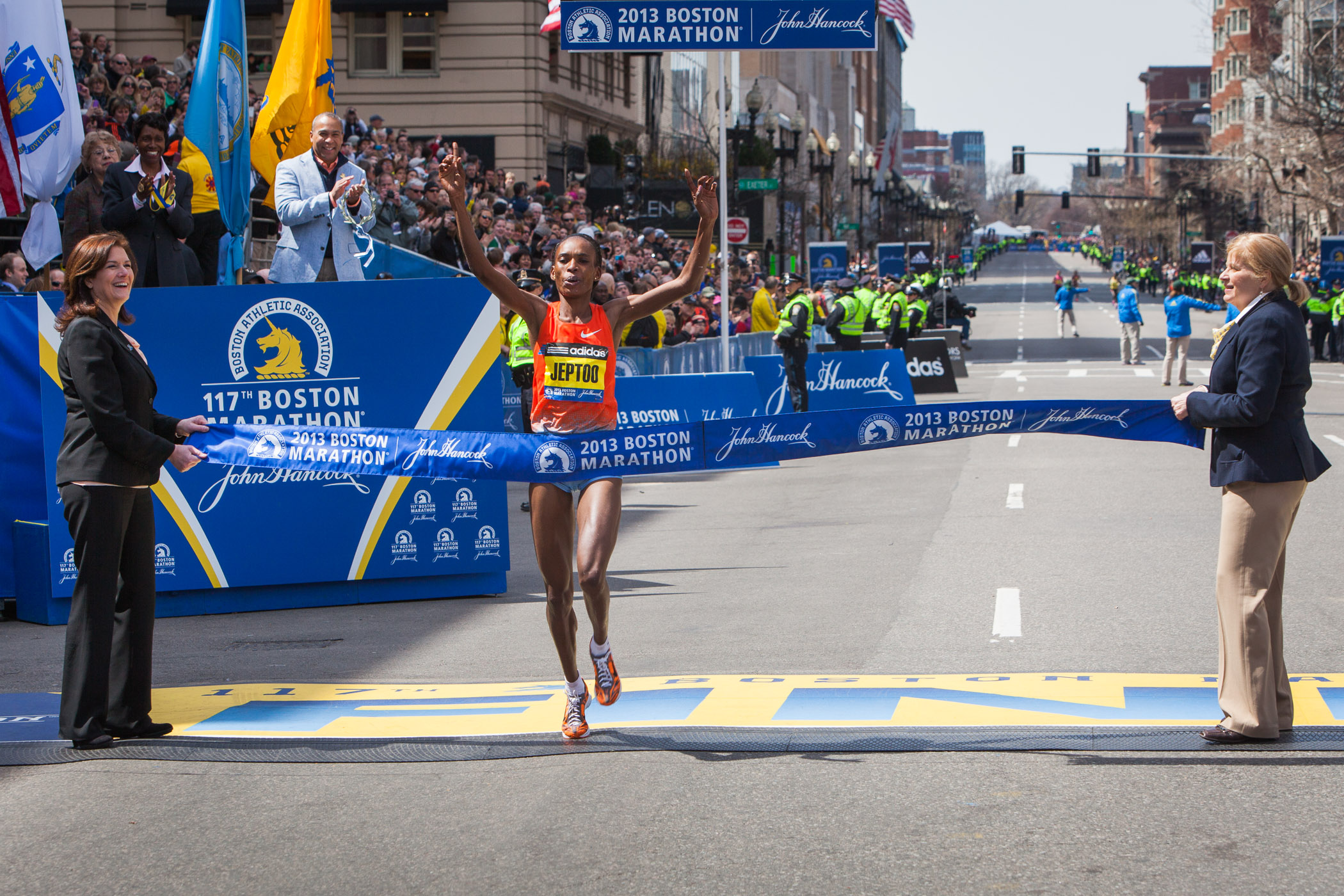
Rita Jeptoo crossing the finishing line

In the women's race, a small pack broke away from the main pack early on. All the runners but Yolanda Caballero dropped back to the main pack while Caballero continued on past half-way. She was eventually caught when Ana Dulce Félix increased the pace and broke away from the main pack to gain a lead of 76 seconds. She was caught in 3 miles (4.8 km) by a group comprising Jeptoo, Cherop, Hailu and Shalane Flanagan. Jeptoo managed to break away from the others after 40 kilometres (25 mi) when climbing an overpass to cross the Massachusetts Turnpike, and finished in a time of 2:26:25. She finished 33 seconds ahead of Hailu, who took second place. Cherop took third, 3 seconds behind Hailu and Flanagan finished fourth.

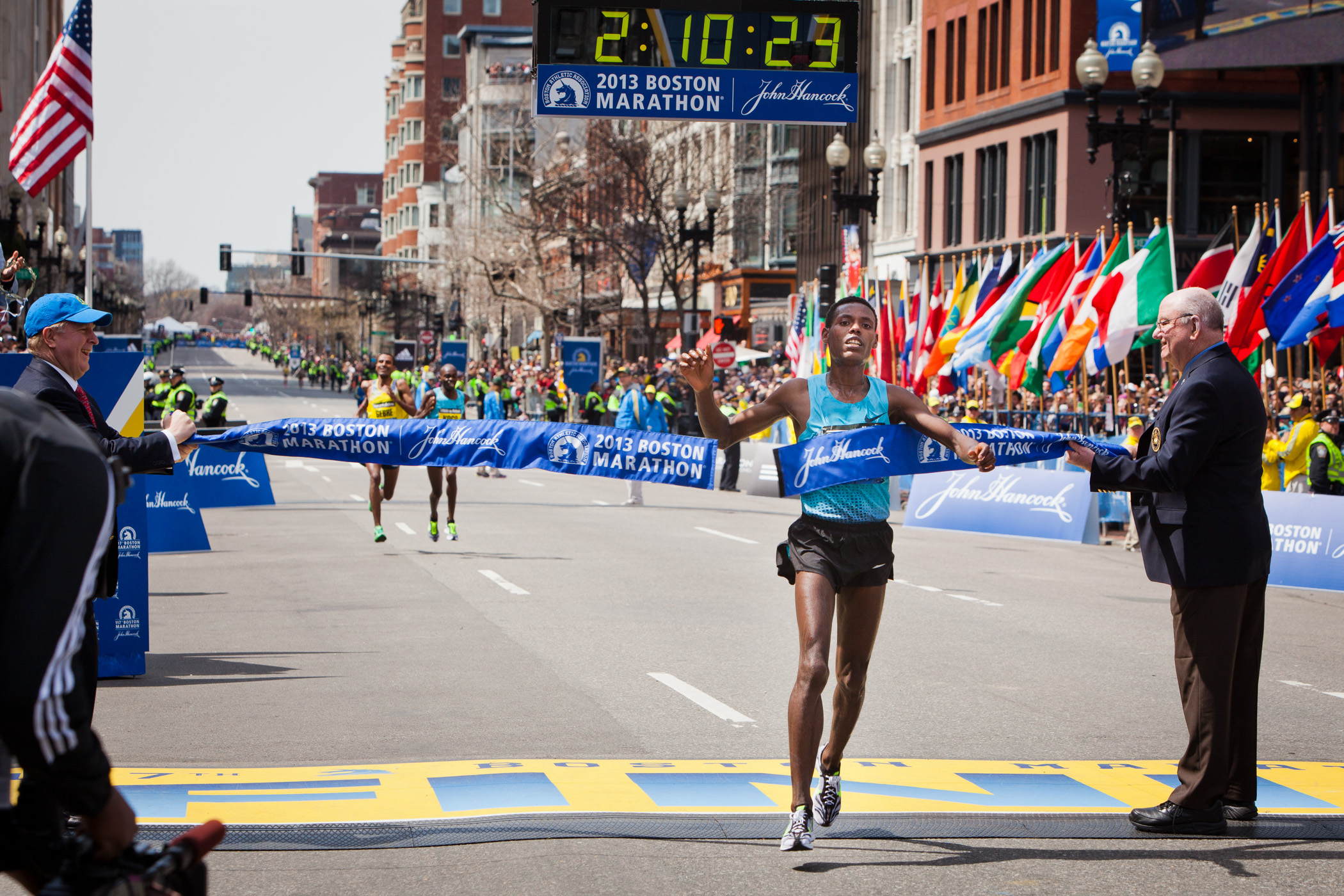
Lelisa Desisa crossing the finishing line

In the men's race, Jason Hartmann and Fernando Cabada led during the early miles before a group of nine caught up before half-way. The pack of eleven passed half-way in a slow time of 1:04:44, before Robin Watson, Geneti, Micah Kogo, and Dickson Chumba made surges. However, it was Chumba's surge that broke up the pack; only Desisa, Matebo Omari, Geneti, and 2009 winner Deriba Merga remained, with Gebremariam, Kogo, Raji Assefa, and Korir falling a few seconds behind. Desisa made a surge in the 24th mile to further reduce the pack to just himself, Kogo and Gebremariam (who had both caught back on). In the final mile, Desisa was able to pull away in a sprint to win in 2:10:22. Kogo finished five seconds back in 2:10:27 and Gebremariam finished a second behind Kogo in 2:10:28, with Hartmann taking fourth, as he did in 2012.

In total, 23,336 competitors, from all 50 states plus Washington, D.C., and Puerto Rico, and from 92 countries, participated in the marathon.

== Starting times ==
In 2013, the starting times were:

- 9:00 a.m.: Mobility Impaired Program
- 9:17 a.m.: Push Rim Wheelchair Division
- 9:22 a.m.: Handcycle Participants
- 9:32 a.m.: Elite Women
- 10:00 a.m.: Elite Men and Wave One
- 10:20 a.m.: Wave Two
- 10:40 a.m.: Wave Three

== Bombing ==
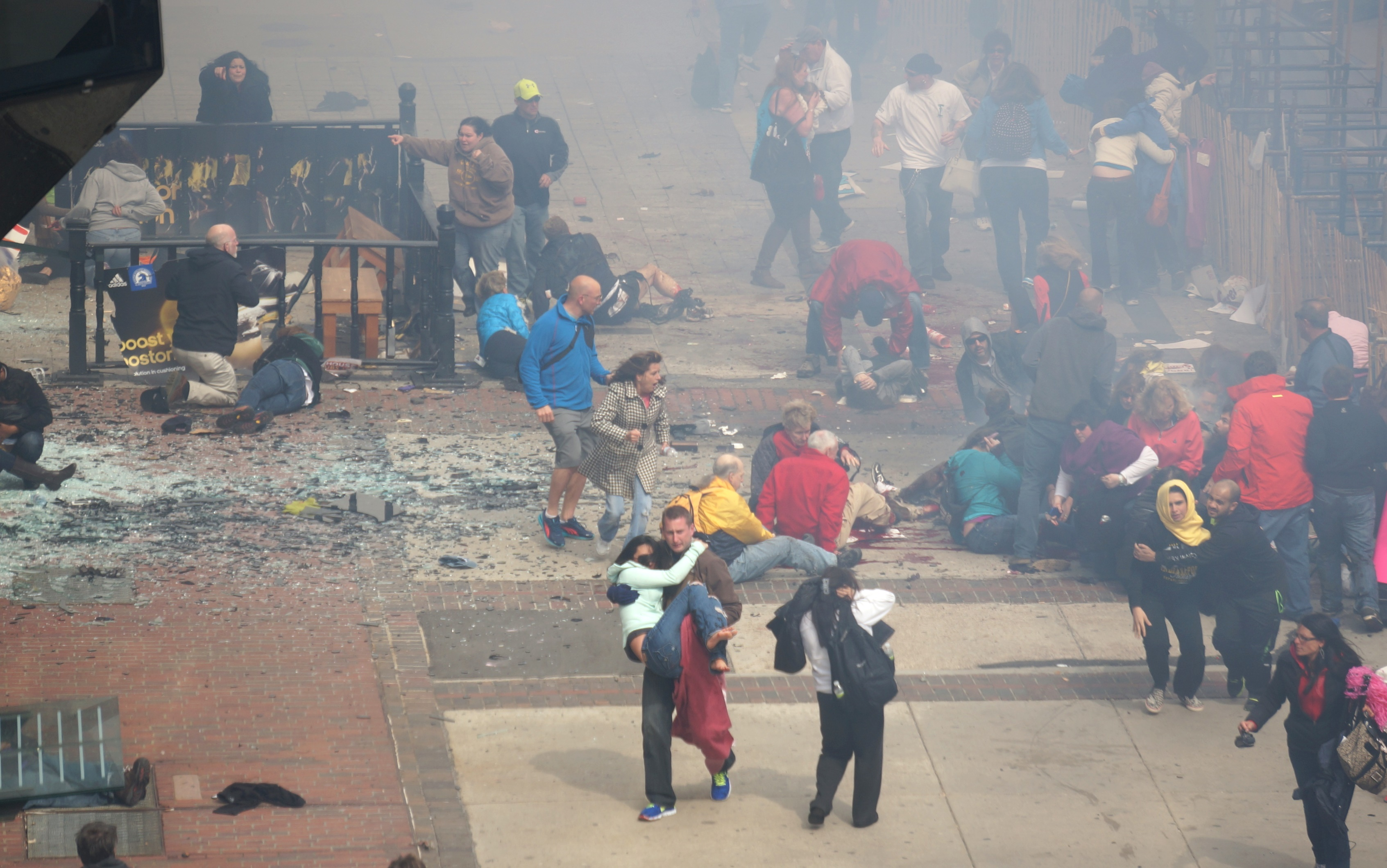
Aftermath of the first blast

At 2:49 p.m. EDT (race clock time 4:09.43), almost two hours after the winners had completed, two explosions occurred near the finish line. Three spectators were killed and 264 others injured. Among the injured, 17 were reported in critical condition, with at least 14 people requiring amputations. The race was halted 8 minutes after the explosions; runners east of Massachusetts Avenue were diverted into Boston Common, while those west of it were diverted to Kenmore Square. Over 5,000 participants who were unable to finish due to the race being halted were given medals and priority to run in the 2014 Boston Marathon.

On May 16, 2013, just one month after the bombings, the Boston Athletic Association (B.A.A.) gave participants who ran at least half the distance but were not able to complete the 2013 Marathon early entry into the 2014 race. The B.A.A. agreed to allow these 5,633 runners entry in August, compared to September for regular entrants. Qualifying standards were also waived for them. A memorial was erected in August 2019 on Boylston Street. It was built by sculptor Pablo Eduardo and consists of bronze spires surrounding two granite pillars.

Howard Mayes and four other runners crossed the finish line at the moment, down to the second, of the first explosion. A documentary film, 5 Runners, premiered on April 14, 2014, the eve of the attack's first anniversary.

== Results ==
Elite Men
Position	Athlete	Nationality	Time
1	Lelisa Desisa	Ethiopia	2:10:22
2	Micah Kogo	Kenya	2:10:27
3	Gebre Gebremariam	Ethiopia	2:10:28
4	Jason Hartmann	United States	2:12:12
5	Wesley Korir	Kenya	2:12:30
6	Markos Geneti	Ethiopia	2:12:44
7	Dickson Chumba	Kenya	2:14:08
8	Jeffrey Hunt	Australia	2:14:28
9	Daniel Tapia	United States	2:14:30
10	Craig Leon	United States	2:14:38

Elite Women
Position	Athlete	Nationality	Time
1	Rita Jeptoo	Kenya	2:26:25
2	Meseret Hailu	Ethiopia	2:26:58
3	Sharon Cherop	Kenya	2:27:01
4	Shalane Flanagan	United States	2:27:08
5	Tirfi Tsegaye	Ethiopia	2:28:09
6	Kara Goucher	United States	2:28:11
7	Madaí Pérez	Mexico	2:28:59
8	Diane Nukuri	Burundi	2:29:54
9	Ana Dulce Felix	Portugal	2:30:05
10	Sabrina Mockenhaupt	Germany	2:30:09

=== Wheelchair ===
Men
Position	Athlete	Nationality	Time
1	Hiroyuki Yamamoto	Japan	1:25:33
2	Ernst van Dyk	South Africa	1:27:12
3	Kota Hokinoue	Japan	1:27:13

Women
Position	Athlete	Nationality	Time
1	Tatyana McFadden	United States	1:45:25
2	Sandra Graf	Switzerland	1:46:54
3	Amanda McGrory	United States	1:49:19
