= Daniel Wanjiru =

Kenyan long-distance runner

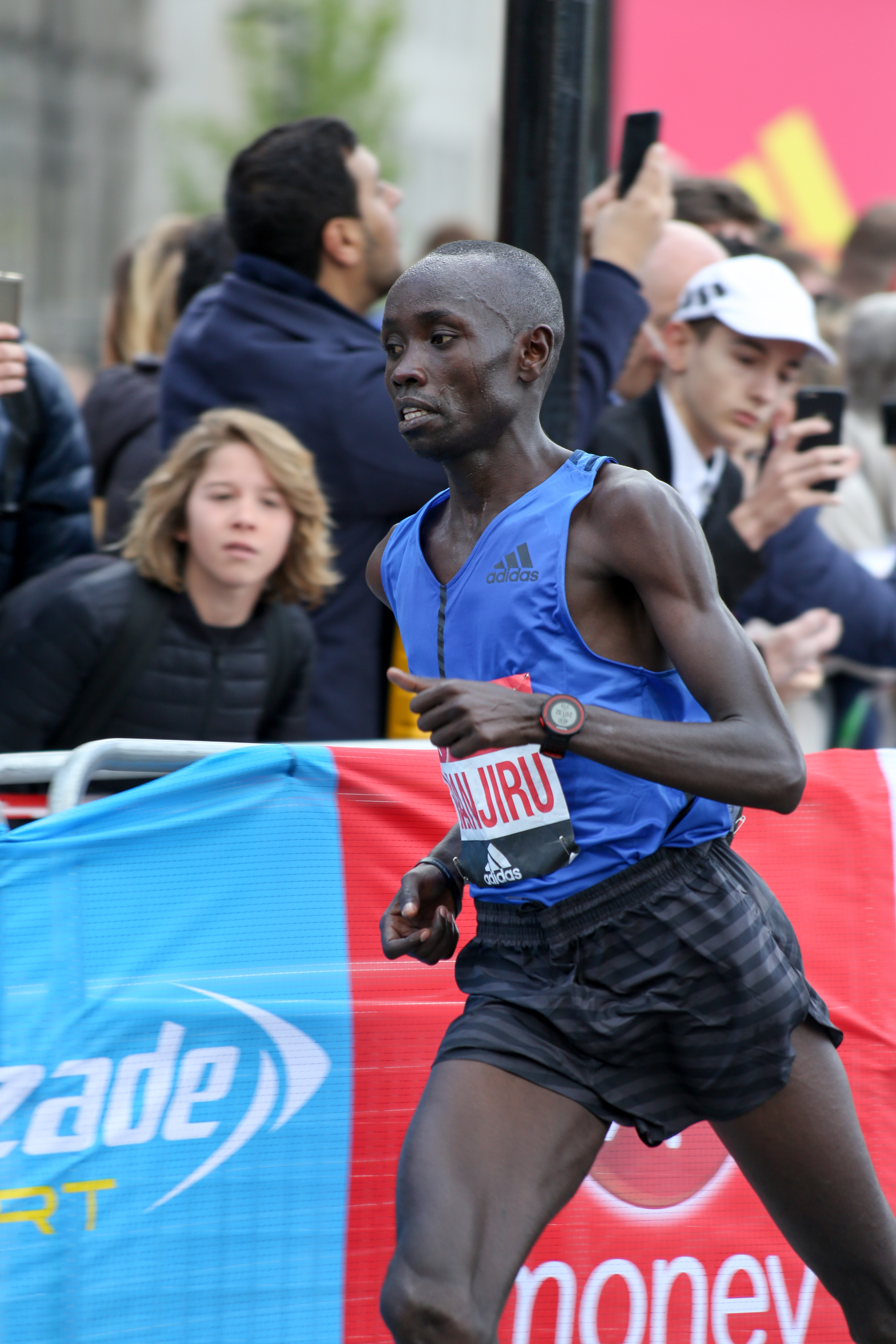
- Daniel Wanjiru in the 2017 London Marathon
- Born: Daniel Kinyua Wanjiru; 26 May 1992 (age 33); Embu County, Kenya
- Occupation: Runner

Daniel Kinyua Wanjiru (born 26 May 1992) is a former Kenyan long-distance runner. He won both the 2016 Amsterdam Marathon and the 2017 London Marathon. His personal best time for the marathon is 2:05:21, set in Amsterdam in 2016.

Wanjiru served a four-year ban from 2019 to 2023 for an anti-doping rule violation

== Early life ==
Wanjiru was born on 26 May 1992 in Embu County, Kenya to Sally Wanjiru. He received his education at Mutitu High School and graduated in 2008. He started running while at school. Daniel Wanjiru is not related to the late marathoner Samuel Wanjiru.

Wanjiru is a resident of Kirinyaga County, Kirinyaga Central Constituency, Kanyeki-ini ward.

== Career ==
Wanjiru started his career in the non-profit team Run2gether (founded by former Austrian orienteering champion Thomas Krejci) winning several road races mainly in Austria and Italy.

In 2016 Wanjiru won the Amsterdam Marathon in a course-record time. He was twice winner of the Prague Half Marathon (2015 and 2016).

In October 2020, Wanjru was issued with a four-year competition ban backdated to 2019 for an anti-doping rule violation in relation to abnormalities in his Athlete Biological Passport. An appeal to the Court of Arbitration for Sport was dismissed in 2022. His results from 9 March 2019 was disqualified including his eleventh place at the 2019 London Marathon.

== Achievements ==
Year	Competition	Venue	Position	Event	Notes
Representing Kenya
2013	Karlovy Vary Half Marathon	Karlovy Vary, Czech Republic	1st	Half Marathon	1:03:04
2014	Wachau Half Marathon	Wachau, Austria	1st	Half Marathon	1:00:38
2014	Frankfurt Marathon	Frankfurt, Germany	7th	Marathon	2:08:18
2015	Prague Half Marathon	Prague, Czech Republic	1st	Half Marathon	59:51
2016	Amsterdam Marathon	Amsterdam, Netherlands	1st	Marathon	2:05:21
2016	Prague Half Marathon	Prague, Czech Republic	1st	Half Marathon	59:20
2016	Prague Marathon	Prague, Czech Republic	4th	Marathon	2:09:25
2017	2017 London Marathon	London, United Kingdom	1st	Marathon	2:05:48
2017	World Championships in Athletics	London, United Kingdom	8th	Marathon	2:12:16
2018	London Marathon	London, United Kingdom	8th	Marathon	2:10:35
2018	New York City Marathon	New York City, United States	5th	Marathon	2:10:21
2019	London Marathon	London, United Kingdom	DQ ~~(11th)~~	Marathon	~~2:08:40~~
