= 2013 IAAF World Cross Country Championships – Junior women's race =

Junior women's race at the 2013 IAAF World Cross Country Championships
- Organisers: IAAF
- Edition: 40th
- Date: March 24
- Host city: Bydgoszcz, Województwo kujawsko-pomorskie, Poland
- Venue: Myślęcinek Park
- Events: 1
- Distances: 6 km – Junior women
- Participation: 86 athletes from 21 nations

The Junior women's race at the 2013 IAAF World Cross Country Championships was held at the Myślęcinek Park in Bydgoszcz, Poland, on March 24, 2013. Reports of the event were given in the Herald and for the IAAF.

Complete results for individuals, and for teams were published.

== Race results ==
=== Junior women's race (6 km) ===
==== Individual ====
Rank	Athlete	Country	Time
1st place, gold medalist(s)	Faith Chepngetich Kipyegon	Kenya	17:51
2nd place, silver medalist(s)	Agnes Jebet Tirop	Kenya	17:51
3rd place, bronze medalist(s)	Alemitu Heroye	Ethiopia	17:57
4	Caroline Chepkoech Kipkirui	Kenya	18:09
5	Ruti Aga	Ethiopia	18:18
6	Sofiya Shemsu	Ethiopia	18:20
7	Rosefline Chepngetich	Kenya	18:21
8	Sheila Chepngetich Keter	Kenya	18:21
9	Buze Diriba	Ethiopia	18:29
10	Alemitu Hawi	Ethiopia	18:35
11	Pauline Kaveke Kamulu	Kenya	18:43
12	Gotytom Gebreslase	Ethiopia	18:44
13	Nancy Cheptegei	Uganda	19:07
14	Stella Chesang	Uganda	19:09
15	Fadwa Sidi Madane	Morocco	19:17
16	Emelia Gorecka	United Kingdom	19:19
17	Georgia Taylor-Brown	United Kingdom	19:26
18	Azusa Sumi	Japan	19:28
19	Miyuki Uehara	Japan	19:32
20	Carrie Verdon	United States	19:33
21	Amy Eloise Neale	United Kingdom	19:34
22	Yohana Zemuy	Eritrea	19:35
23	Emily Stites	United States	19:37
24	Saki Yoshimizu	Japan	19:39
25	Michaela Quinn	Australia	19:39
26	Sofia Ennaoui	Poland	19:45
27	Bobby Clay	United Kingdom	19:45
28	Kathryn Knight	United States	19:52
29	Maki Izumida	Japan	19:54
30	Hadjer Soukhal	Algeria	19:55
31	Rachael Zena Chebet	Uganda	19:55
32	Winta Mekonen	Eritrea	19:58
33	Rebecca Weston	United Kingdom	20:00
34	Erin Finn	United States	20:03
35	Alex Clay	United Kingdom	20:11
36	Mbrak Efrem	Eritrea	20:12
37	Samantha Prime	Australia	20:18
38	Sydney Scott	United States	20:19
39	Militsa Mircheva	Bulgaria	20:20
40	Phanice Chemutai	Uganda	20:23
41	Natalia Wiera	Poland	20:23
42	Silvana Dias	Portugal	20:25
43	Nanami Aoki	Japan	20:28
44	Samantha Nadel	United States	20:30
45	Glenrose Xaba	South Africa	20:31
46	Madeline Yungblut	Canada	20:34
47	Madeline McDonald	Canada	20:36
48	Katarzyna Rutkowska	Poland	20:39
49	Jillian Forsey	Canada	20:40
50	Amy Cashin	Australia	20:48
51	Sylwia Slezak	Poland	20:49
52	Adriana Gutiérrez	Spain	20:50
53	Yui Fukuda	Japan	20:52
54	Zandile Hadebe	South Africa	20:57
55	Cristina Espejo	Spain	20:58
56	Soukaina Atanane	Morocco	21:08
57	Nabila Senani	Algeria	21:10
58	Paulina Pawlowska	Poland	21:10
59	Courtney Scott	Australia	21:11
60	Johanna Geyer Carles	France	21:11
61	Sarah Wismer	Canada	21:13
62	Sunilda Lozano	Peru	21:18
63	Natalia Hawthorn	Canada	21:19
64	Alicja Konieczek	Poland	21:20
65	Beatriz Álvarez	Spain	21:27
66	Xin Cao	China	21:29
67	Sabrina Yahi	Algeria	21:31
68	Diana del Ser	Spain	21:32
69	Laydy Curasi	Peru	21:41
70	Evelyn Escobar	Peru	21:42
71	Thandeka Emily Manzana	South Africa	21:44
72	Sara Douis	Algeria	21:45
73	July da Silva	Brazil	21:46
74	Lalia Badji	Algeria	22:15
75	Gabriela Stafford	Canada	22:23
76	Soumaya Douri	Tunisia	22:31
77	Rafika Abdennebi	Tunisia	22:31
78	Hetaira Palacios	Peru	22:34
79	Jéssica Soares	Brazil	22:45
80	Jacira Santos	Brazil	22:58
81	Nathalia Ramalho	Brazil	22:59
82	Soumaya Dhahri	Tunisia	23:21
83	Jihen Lassoued	Tunisia	23:38
84	Afef Issaoui	Tunisia	23:45
85	Annie Bothma	South Africa	23:45
86	Ameni Manai	Tunisia	25:19
—	Kaouther Khoudour	Algeria	DNS
—	Sandra Jalayta	Palestine	DNS

==== Teams ====
Rank	Team	Points
1st place, gold medalist(s)	Kenya: Faith Chepngetich Kipyegon / 1; Agnes Jebet Tirop / 2; Caroline Chepkoech Kipkirui / 4; Rosefline Chepngetich / 7; (Sheila Chepngetich Keter) / (8); (Pauline Kaveke Kamulu) / (11)	14
2nd place, silver medalist(s)	Ethiopia: Alemitu Heroye / 3; Ruti Aga / 5; Sofiya Shemsu / 6; Buze Diriba / 9; (Alemitu Hawi) / (10); (Gotytom Gebreslase) / (12)	23
3rd place, bronze medalist(s)	United Kingdom: Emelia Gorecka / 16; Georgia Taylor-Brown / 17; Amy Eloise Neale / 21; Bobby Clay / 27; (Rebecca Weston) / (33); (Alex Clay) / (35)	81
4	Japan: Azusa Sumi / 18; Miyuki Uehara / 19; Saki Yoshimizu / 24; Maki Izumida / 29; (Nanami Aoki) / (43); (Yui Fukuda) / (53)	90
5	Uganda: Nancy Cheptegei / 13; Stella Chesang / 14; Rachael Zena Chebet / 31; Phanice Chemutai / 40	98
6	United States: Carrie Verdon / 20; Emily Stites / 23; Kathryn Knight / 28; Erin Finn / 34; (Sydney Scott) / (38); (Samantha Nadel) / (44)	105
7	Poland: Sofia Ennaoui / 26; Natalia Wiera / 41; Katarzyna Rutkowska / 48; Sylwia Slezak / 51; (Paulina Pawlowska) / (58); (Alicja Konieczek) / (64)	166
8	Australia: Michaela Quinn / 25; Samantha Prime / 37; Amy Cashin / 50; Courtney Scott / 59	171
9	Canada: Madeline Yungblut / 46; Madeline McDonald / 47; Jillian Forsey / 49; Sarah Wismer / 61; (Natalia Hawthorn) / (63); (Gabriela Stafford) / (75)	203
10	Algeria: Hadjer Soukhal / 30; Nabila Senani / 57; Sabrina Yahi / 67; Sara Douis / 72; (Lalia Badji) / (74)	226
11	Spain: Adriana Gutiérrez / 52; Cristina Espejo / 55; Beatriz Álvarez / 65; Diana del Ser / 68	240
12	South Africa: Glenrose Xaba / 45; Zandile Hadebe / 54; Thandeka Emily Manzana / 71; Annie Bothma / 85	255
13	Peru: Sunilda Lozano / 62; Laydy Curasi / 69; Evelyn Escobar / 70; Hetaira Palacios / 78	279
14	Brazil: July da Silva / 73; Jéssica Soares / 79; Jacira Santos / 80; Nathalia Ramalho / 81	313
15	Tunisia: Soumaya Douri / 76; Rafika Abdennebi / 77; Soumaya Dhahri / 82; Jihen Lassoued / 83; (Afef Issaoui) / (84); (Ameni Manai) / (86)	318

- Note: Athletes in parentheses did not score for the team result.

== Participation ==
According to an unofficial count, 86 athletes from 21 countries participated in the Junior women's race. The announced athlete from Palestine did not show.

- Algeria (5)
- Australia (4)
- Brazil (4)
- Bulgaria (1)
- Canada (6)
- China (1)
- Eritrea (3)
- Ethiopia (6)
- France (1)
- Japan (6)
- Kenya (6)
- Morocco (2)
- Peru (4)
- Poland (6)
- Portugal (1)
- South Africa (4)
- Spain (4)
- Tunisia (6)
- Uganda (4)
- United Kingdom (6)
- United States (6)

== See also ==
- 2013 IAAF World Cross Country Championships – Senior men's race
- 2013 IAAF World Cross Country Championships – Junior men's race
- 2013 IAAF World Cross Country Championships – Senior women's race
