= Agnes Tirop =

Kenyan long-distance runner (1995–2021)

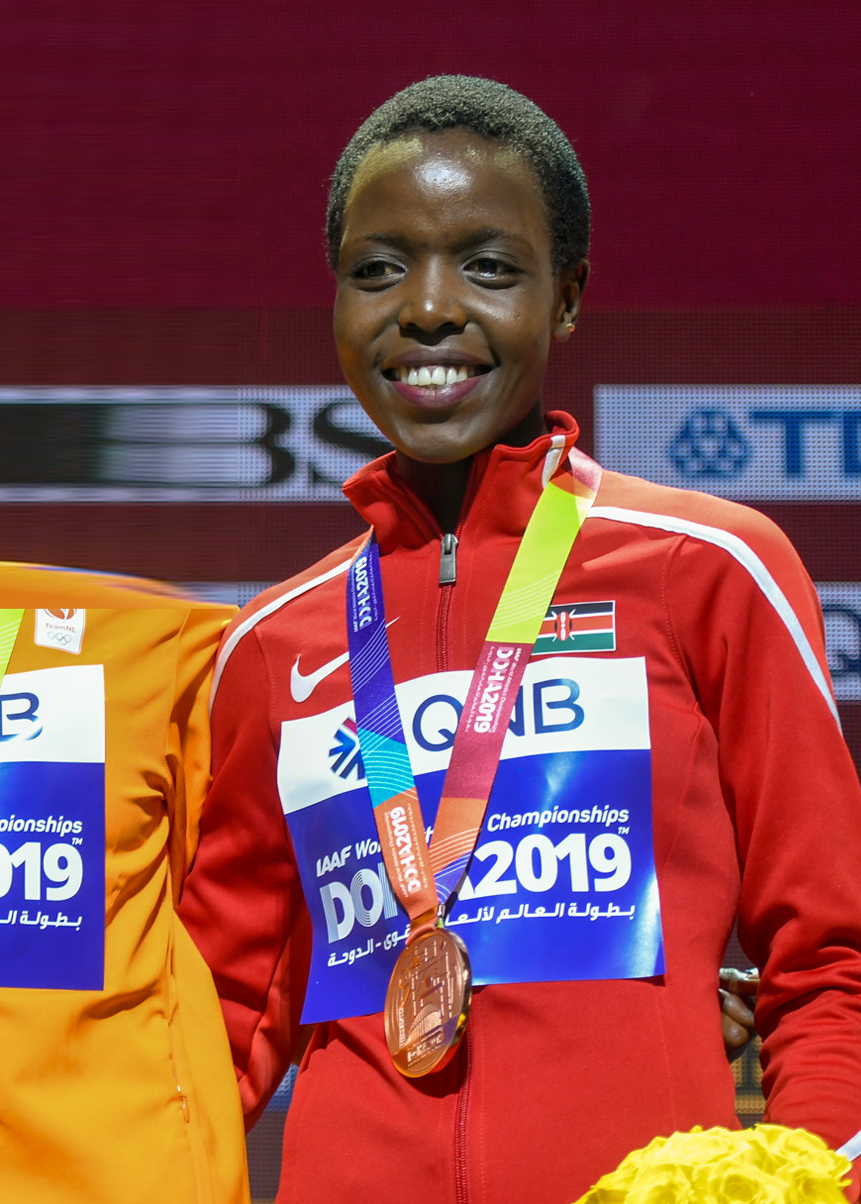
- Tirop with her bronze medal at the 2019 World Athletics Championships in Doha

Personal information
- Born: Agnes Jebet Tirop; 23 October 1995 Uasin Gishu County, Kenya
- Died: 13 October 2021 (aged 25) Iten, Kenya

Sport
- Country: Kenya
- Sport: Athletics
- Events: 5000 metres, 10,000 metres; Cross country

Achievements and titles
- Olympic finals: 2020 Tokyo; 5000 m – 4th
- World finals: 2017 London; 10,000 m – Bronze; 2019 Doha; 10,000 m – Bronze
- Personal bests: 3000 m: 8:22.92 (Doha 2020); 5000 m: 14:20.68 (London 2019); 10,000 m: 30:25.20 (Doha 2019); 10 km: 30:01 WR (Wo) (Herzogenaurach 2021)
Medal record
Women's athletics
Representing Kenya
World Championships
Bronze medal – third place	2017 London	10,000 m
Bronze medal – third place	2019 Doha	10,000 m
World Junior Championships
Bronze medal – third place	2012 Barcelona	5000 m
Bronze medal – third place	2014 Eugene	5000 m
World Cross Country Championships
Gold medal – first place	2013 Bydgoszcz	Junior team
Gold medal – first place	2015 Guiyang	Senior race
Gold medal – first place	2017 Kampala	Senior team
Silver medal – second place	2013 Bydgoszcz	Junior race
Silver medal – second place	2015 Guiyang	Senior team
African Cross Country Championships
Gold medal – first place	2014 Kampala	Junior race
Silver medal – second place	2012 Cape Town	Junior race

Agnes Jebet Tirop (23 October 1995 – 13 October 2021) was a Kenyan professional long-distance runner. She won bronze medals in the 10,000 metres at the 2017 and 2019 World Athletics Championships. At the 2015 IAAF World Cross Country Championships, Tirop became the second-youngest ever gold medallist in the women's race, after Zola Budd. At the time of her death in 2021, she was the world-record holder in the 10 kilometres women's-only event.

At junior level, she was a bronze medallist at the 2012 and 2014 World Junior Championships in Athletics as well as the silver medallist at the 2013 IAAF World Cross Country Championships. She won a silver and a gold at the 2012 and 2014 African Cross Country Championships, respectively.

Tirop was killed at the age of 25 by multiple stab wounds to the neck and stomach. Her husband, Ibrahim Rotich, is on trial as the prime suspect. She was buried in her hometown in the Kenyan highlands at a funeral attended by over 1,000 mourners.

== Career ==
Tirop first came to prominence at the national level in 2012, when she was runner-up to world junior champion Faith Kipyegon at the Kenyan Cross Country Championships. This led to her first national selection and international medal at the 2012 African Cross Country Championships, where she was again the runner-up to Kipyegon and took the junior silver medal. She was Kenya's most prominent entrant for the 5,000 metres at the 2012 World Junior Championships in Athletics and finished with a bronze medal in a personal best of 15:36.74 minutes, behind Ethiopian competition.

Tirop was again second to Kipyegon at the 2013 Kenyan Cross Country Championships, and teamwork between the pair led to a Kenyan 1–2 and team title at the 2013 IAAF World Cross Country Championships—Kipyegon defended her title while Tirop was a narrow second to claim her first medal at the competition. She made progress on the track that year, setting personal bests of 8:39.13 minutes for the 3,000 metres and 14:50.36 minutes for the 5,000 metres, and also on the roads, with a half marathon best of 71:57 minutes.

In the 2014 season, Tirop finally emerged from Kipyegon's shadow. She won the Kenyan cross country junior title and then dominated the junior race at the 2014 African Cross Country Championships, leading Kenya to victory by a 14-second margin (Kipyegon won both senior races). Tirop was unable to achieve such a margin over runner-up Alemitu Heroye at the 2014 World Junior Championships in Athletics and was again third in the 5,000 m, while the Ethiopians extended Kenya's historic lack of a gold medal in that event.

Tirop entered the senior ranks in the 2015 season and immediately performed well, winning the Eldoret Discovery Cross Country in Kenya. She was second to Kipyegon at the Kenyan senior national championship race and earned a senior national selection—a performance that filled her with confidence. She said at the time, "I did not even believe I could make the team. I will not fear running against seniors." For the 2015 IAAF World Cross Country Championships, after Kipyegon withdrew, the reigning world champion Emily Chebet was seen as Kenya's leading athlete, and Tirop as a key team member. Despite this being her senior international debut and as the fourth youngest athlete in the field, Tirop took to the front and gradually moved away from the field to win the senior gold medal, some five seconds ahead of Ethiopia's Senbere Teferi. This made the 19-year-old the second-youngest winner of that title in championships history, after Zola Budd's win in 1985, and also brought her Kenya's 300th medal at the competition. With Ethiopia rounding out the top four and defending champion Chebet in sixth, Kenya came in second in the team race.

In 2017, Tirop participated in the World Championships held in London, winning the bronze medal in the 10,000 metres event, with a time of 31:03.50, her personal best in the distance.

In 2018, she won the World 10K Bangalore race in a course record time of 31:19.

Tirop won her second consecutive world bronze medal in the 10,000 metres at the 2019 World Athletics Championships, held in Doha, Qatar, running a new personal best of 30:25.20.

At the delayed 2020 Tokyo Olympics in 2021, Tirop came fourth in the 5,000-metre event. In September that year, she smashed the world record in a women-only 10-kilometre race, set in 2002, by 28 seconds. She then ran a time of 30:01 at the Road to Records event hosted in Herzogenaurach, Germany. In October, she came second at the Giants Geneva 10K race, behind Ethiopia's Kalkidan Gezahegne, in a time of 30:20.

== Death ==
Tirop was found dead in her home in Iten, Elgeyo-Marakwet County, on 13 October 2021; she had multiple stab wounds in the neck and abdomen. Authorities believe a domestic altercation occurred and Tirop was stabbed, as they also found her car windows had been shattered. A search began for Tirop's husband, Ibrahim Rotich, when he went missing after calling his family crying and asking for God's forgiveness for something he had done. He was then involved in a lengthy high-speed chase, trying to flee the country, and ultimately rammed his getaway vehicle into a truck near Mombasa. He was subsequently arrested and questioned about Tirop's death. Rotich was remanded for two years while awaiting trial for Tirop's murder but was granted release on bail in November 2023 to await trial.

Tirop was buried near her parents' home in Kapnyamisa, Nandi County, on 23 October 2021.

Her younger sister Everlyne Jepngetich, who lived with her, testified that Ibrahim Rotich had been violent to Agnes and that on the night before the killing, Everlyne heard Rotich bitterly quarrelling with Tirop for many hours, and that the next morning, she saw her sister badly beaten.

In December 2023, the prosecution tabled a suicide note, found at the scene, written by Rotich. In the note, Rotich claimed that he was in a toxic relationship with Tirop, and that it was better if he died by suicide.

In November 2024, the case was updated with new testimonies: Joseph Cheromei, Tirop's longtime coach, and Giani Demadona, an Italian athletics manager, testified that both were concerned for Tirop's safety because she had a lover, which could have angered her separated husband, who had previously been violent to her. Miriam Rotich, Ibrahim Rotich's sister-in-law, testified that he had borrowed her car on the day of Tirop's murder, and when she saw him, he appeared unusually tense and was sweating profusely. He subsequently crashed the car while attempting to escape to Tanzania and being pursued by the police. Tirop's father and brother had previously testified that Rotich didn't allow Tirop to communicate with her family or financially assist them. Tirop's pacesetter, Victor Koilel, testified that Rotich spent the money Tirop earned and assaulted her whenever she questioned him.

Rotich failed to appear in court on 18 March 2025, in response to which the judge issued a warrant for his arrest.

As of May 2026, the police had not apprehended Rotich, and the trial had not begun, despite applications for it to take place in his absence.

== Aftermath ==
Tirop's murder shook the Kenyan athletics community and the sports world.

In 2021, the NGO Tirop's Angels was founded by fellow athletes. It aims to help victims of gender-based violence in Kenya and abroad. In May 2024, the organization opened a centre in Iten that will serve as a shelter for victims of violence and abuse.

== Personal bests ==
These were Tirop's lifetime bests:

- 2000 metres – 5:48.65 (Amsterdam 2013)
- 3000 metres – 8:22.92 (Doha 2020)
- 5000 metres – 14:20.68 (London 2019)
- 10,000 metres – 30:25.20 (Doha 2019)

Road

- 5 km – 15:30 (Bolzano 2017)
- 10 km – 30:01 (Herzogenaurach 2021) Wo World record

== International competitions ==
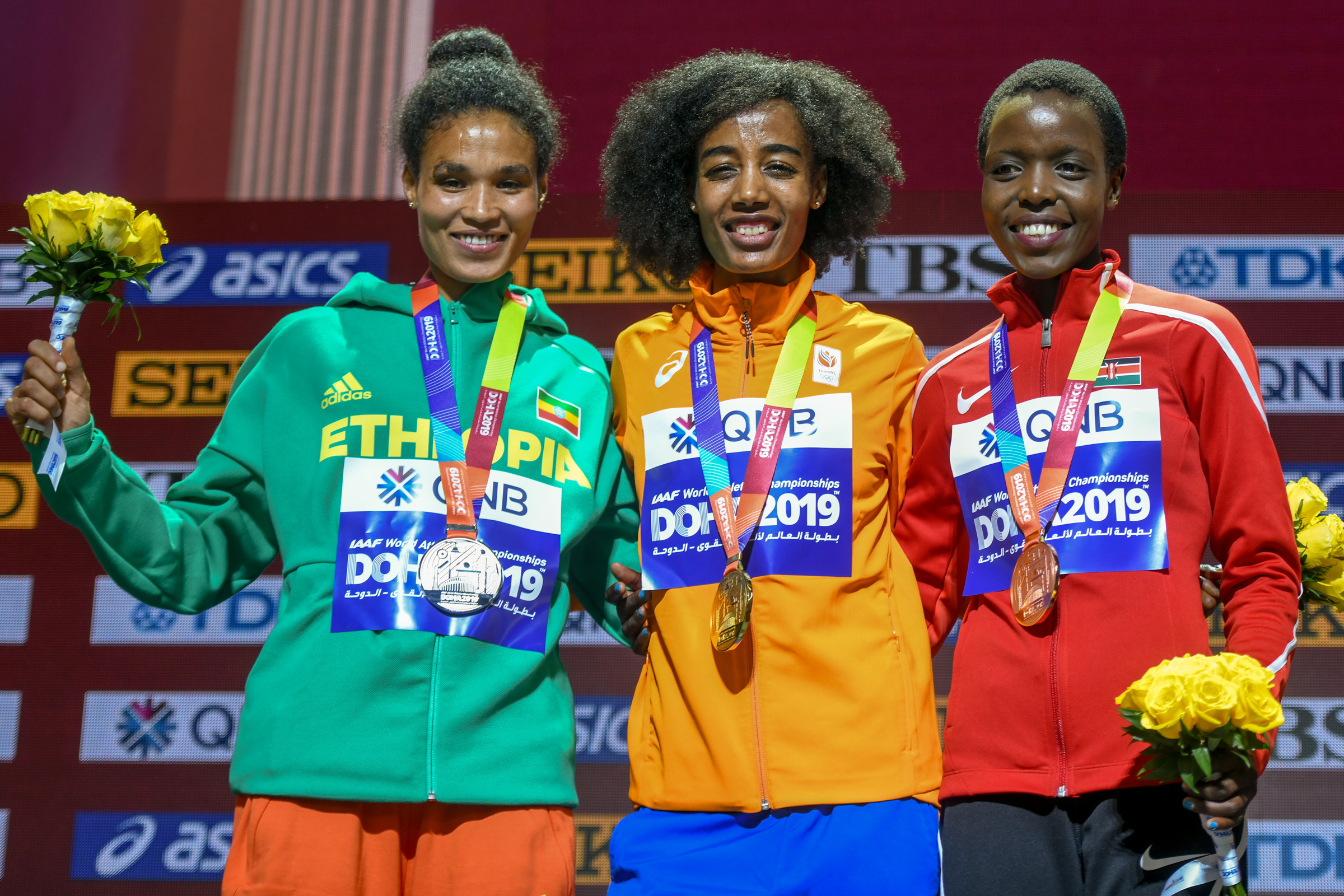
Agnes Tirop (R in red) with her second world 10,000 m bronze at the 2019 World Athletics Championships, in Doha

Representing Kenya
Year	Competition	Venue	Position	Event	Result
2012	African Cross Country Championships	Cape Town, South Africa	2nd	Junior race	19:34
2012	World Junior Championships	Barcelona, Spain	3rd	5000 m	15:36.74
2013	World Cross Country Championships	Bydgoszcz, Poland	2nd	Junior race	17:51
2013	World Cross Country Championships	Bydgoszcz, Poland	1st	Junior team	14 pts
2014	African Cross Country Championships	Kampala, Uganda	1st	Junior race	18:51
2014	African Cross Country Championships	Kampala, Uganda	1st	Junior team	13 pts
2014	World Junior Championships	Eugene, OR, United States	3rd	5000 m	15:43.12
2015	World Cross Country Championships	Guiyang, China	1st	Senior race	26:01
2015	World Cross Country Championships	Guiyang, China	2nd	Senior team	19 pts
2017	World Championships	London, United Kingdom	3rd	10,000 m	31:03.50 PB
2019	World Championships	Doha, Qatar	3rd	10,000 m	30:25.20 PB
2021	Olympic Games	Tokyo, Japan	4th	5000 m	14:39.62 SB
