= Alemitu Heroye =

Ethiopian long-distance runner

Personal information
- Born: 9 May 1995 (age 31) Jigjiga, Ethiopia

Sport
- Country: Ethiopia
- Event: Long-distance running

Achievements and titles
- Personal bests: 3000 m: 8:36.87 (2014); Two miles: 9:20.81 (2014); 5000 m: 14:43.28 (2015); 10000 m: 30:50.83 (2015)
Medal record
World Junior Championships
Gold medal – first place	2014 Eugene	5000 m
African Junior Championships
Bronze medal – third place	2013 Bambous	5000 m
World Cross Country Championships
Bronze medal – third place	2013 Bydgoszcz	Junior race (6 km)
African Cross Country Championships
Silver medal – second place	2014 Kampala	Junior race (6 km)
- Updated on 16 August 2015

Alemitu Heroye Banata (born 9 May 1995) is an Ethiopian professional long-distance runner. She was World Junior Champion over 5000 metres in 2014 and placed fourth at the 2015 World Cross Country Championships.

== Career ==
Alemitu Heroye represented Ethiopia at the 2011 World Youth Championships (3000 m), 2012 African Championships (5000 m) and 2012 African Cross Country Championships (junior race), placing in the top five every time but not winning medals. In 2013, she took bronze in the junior race at the World Cross Country Championships in Bydgoszcz, losing to Kenya's Faith Kipyegon and Agnes Jebet Tirop by six seconds; she debuted in the IAAF Diamond League later that year, running the 5000 m in both Shanghai and Paris. She placed second behind Tirop in the junior race at the 2014 African Cross Country Championships in Kampala.

During the 2014 track season, Alemitu set world junior leading times over 3000 m, two miles and 5000 m; her two miles time (9:20.81 at the British Grand Prix in Birmingham) was a new world junior best. She won the 5000 m at the 2014 World Junior Championships in Eugene, outkicking her Ethiopian teammate Alemitu Hawi in 15:10.08 and leaving Tirop (who was slightly injured) more than half a minute behind. At the 2015 World Cross Country Championships in Guiyang Alemitu ran in the senior race for the first time, placing fourth as Tirop won. Alemitu debuted in the 10 000 metres at the 2015 Ethiopian World Championships Trials in Hengelo; she placed second behind Gelete Burka in 30:50.83, qualifying for the World Championships in Beijing.
