= Athletics at the 2015 African Games – Men's 10,000 metres =

The men's 10,000 metres event at the 2015 African Games was held on 17 September.

== Results ==
Rank	Name	Nationality	Time	Notes
1st place, gold medalist(s)	Tsebelu Zewude	Ethiopia	27:27.19	
2nd place, silver medalist(s)	Leonard Barsoton	Kenya	27:27.55	
3rd place, bronze medalist(s)	Adugna Takele	Ethiopia	27:28.40	
4	Vincent Kipsegechi	Kenya	27:40.08	
5	Geoffrey Kipkorir	Kenya	28:09.65	
6	Afewerki Berhane	Eritrea	28:17.87	
7	Mule Wasihun	Ethiopia	28:23.87	
8	Tsegay Tuemay	Eritrea	28:24.30	
9	Félicien Muhitira	Rwanda	29:00.23	
10	Olivier Irabaruta	Burundi	29:17.18	
11	Eric Sebahire	Rwanda	29:24.68	
12	Hatusi Mthimchulu	Lesotho	31:08.88	
13	Osman Charlley	Sierra Leone	33:15.21	
	Rony Ampion	Republic of the Congo	DNF	
	Kabelo Lesica	Lesotho	DNF	
	Thiery Ndikumwenayo	Burundi	DNS	
	Stuart Banda	Malawi	DNS	
