= Yego =

Yego is a surname of Kenyan origin that may refer to:

- Alfred Kirwa Yego (born 1986), Kenyan 800 metres runner and 2007 world champion
- Hillary Yego (born 1992), Kenyan steeplechase runner
- John Yego (born 1988), Kenyan middle-distance runner now competing for Bahrain as Belal Mansoor Ali
- Julius Yego (born 1989), Kenyan javelin thrower
- Gideon Yego (born 1965), Kenyan 400 metres hurdler
- Paul Yego (born 1968), Kenyan marathon runner
- Solomon Kirwa Yego (born 1987), Kenyan half marathon runner

== See also ==
- Kipyego
