= Cheptegei =

- Romanisation: Cheptegei
- Gender: Unisex
- Language: Kalenjin; English

Other gender
- Masculine: Cheptegei
- Feminine: Cheptegei

Origin
- Language: Kalenjin
- Region of origin: East Africa

Other names
- Alternative spelling: Jeptegei
- Anglicisations: Cheptegei; Jeptegei

Cheptegei is a surname of the Kalenjin people from the Kalenjin languages. It is found in Uganda and Kenya, of East Africa. It is a unisex name, in that there is no variation between female and male forms of the surname.

People with this surname include:

- Joshua Cheptegei (born 1996), Ugandan athlete, a long distance runner who has set many world records
- Nancy Cheptegei (born 1994), Ugandan athlete, a long distance and marathon runner; a silver medalist at 3000m in athletics at the 2011 Commonwealth Youth Games, and bronze medalist in team women's 8km at the 2014 African Cross Country Championships
- Rebecca Cheptegei (1991–2024), Ugandan athlete, a long distance and marathon runner

== See also ==
- Media related to Cheptegei (surname) at Wikimedia Commons
