= Leonard Barsoton =

Kenyan long-distance runner

Leonard Kiplimo Barsoton
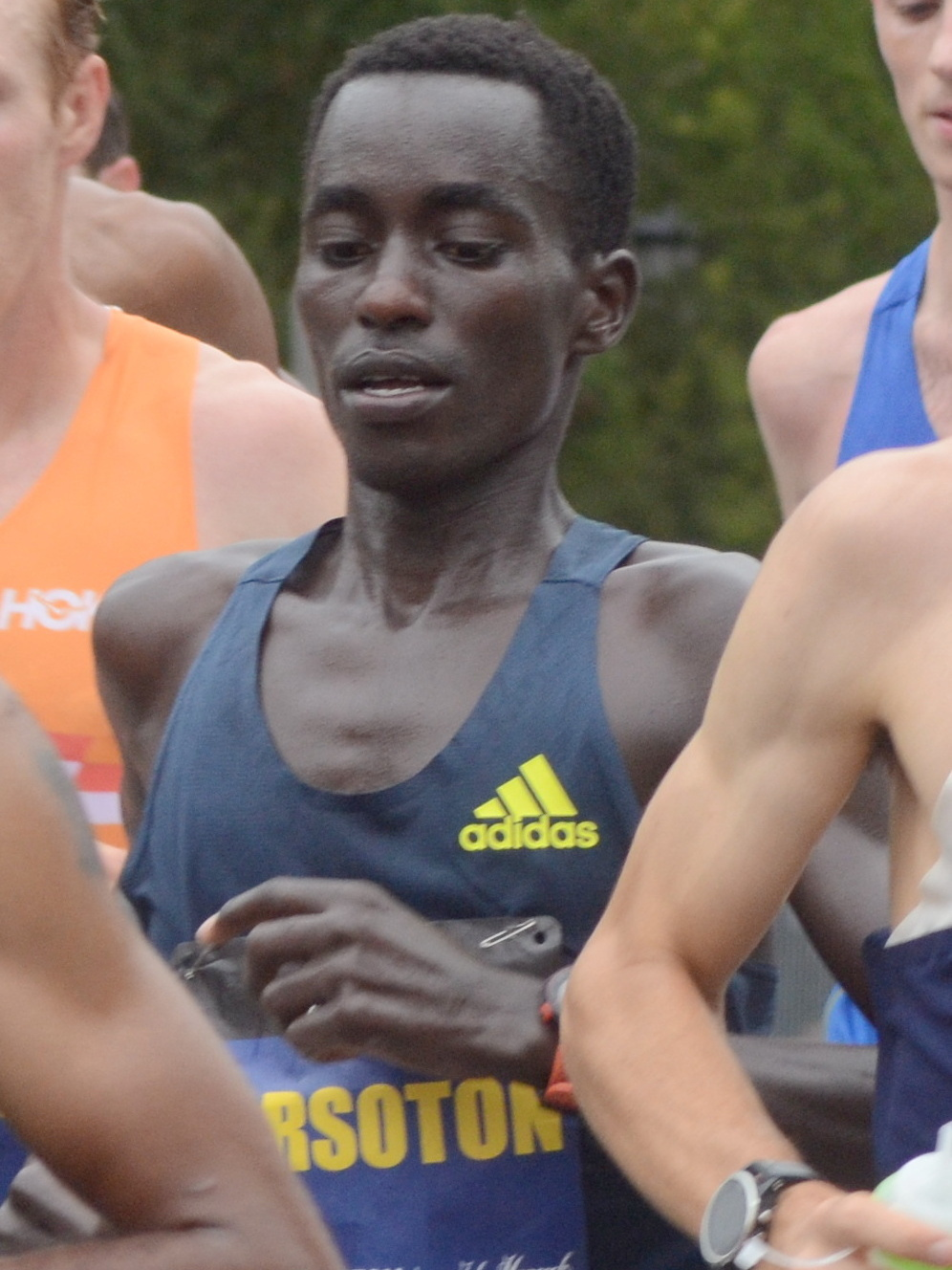
- Barsoton nearing halfway point in 2021 Boston Marathon where he got 5th place

Medal record

Men's athletics

Representing Kenya

African Games
Silver medal – second place	2015 Brazzaville	10,000 m

IAAF World Cross Country Championships
Silver medal – second place	2015 Guiyang	Senior team

African Cross Country Championships
Gold medal – first place	2014 Kampala	Senior race
Gold medal – first place	2014 Kampala	Senior team

Leonard Kiplimo Barsoton (born 21 October 1994) is a Kenyan long-distance runner who competes mainly in cross country running and track events. He has represented his country twice at the IAAF World Cross Country Championships and was a silver medallist over 10,000 metres at the African Games.

== Career ==
After starting his career based in Japan, Barsoton emerged as a junior athlete in 2013 by placing second to Ronald Kwemoi at the national cross country trials. He was chosen for the junior team at the 2013 IAAF World Cross Country Championships and claimed the silver medal in both the individual and team races, having finished adrift of the comfortable favourite Hagos Gebrhiwet. After a runner-up finish behind Bedan Karoki at the Kenyan Cross Country Championships, he led Kenya to a sweep of the medals at the 2014 African Cross Country Championships, winning the race with his teammates Kipruto Kangogo, Rono Cherop and Solomon Kirwa Yego completing the top four. He also proved himself on the track that year with a 10,000 metres best of 27:20.74 minutes, ending the year fifth on the world rankings.

Barsoton established himself as a senior level runner in the 2015 season. Following his third place at the Kenyan Championships, he finished fifth at the 2015 IAAF World Cross Country Championships, helping the Kenyan men to a team silver. On the outdoor track he took a 10,000 m silver at the 2015 African Games, beaten by Ethiopia's Tsebelu Zewude. He failed to build on this in the 2016, not making any national teams, and ranked just outside the world's top 30 for the 10,000 m for season.

He became national champion at the 2017 Kenyan Cross Country Championships.

== Personal bests ==
- 3000 metres – 8:07.1 min (2011)
- 5000 metres – 13:16.25 min (2015)
- 10,000 metres – 27:20.74 min (2014)
- 10K run – 27:42 min (2016)

All information from All-Athletics profile

== International competitions ==
Year	Competition	Venue	Position	Event	Notes
2013	World Cross Country Championships	Bydgoszcz, Poland	2nd	Junior race	21:08
2013	World Cross Country Championships	Bydgoszcz, Poland	2nd	Junior team	26 pts
2014	African Cross Country Championships	Kampala, Uganda	1st	Senior race	34:26.12
2014	African Cross Country Championships	Kampala, Uganda	1st	Senior team	10 pts
2015	World Cross Country Championships	Guiyang, China	5th	Senior race	35:24
2015	World Cross Country Championships	Guiyang, China	2nd	Senior team	20 pts
2015	African Games	Brazzaville, Republic of the Congo	2nd	10,000 m	27:27.55

== National titles ==
- Kenyan Cross Country Championships
  - Senior race: 2017
