= Ruti Aga =

Ethiopian long-distance runner

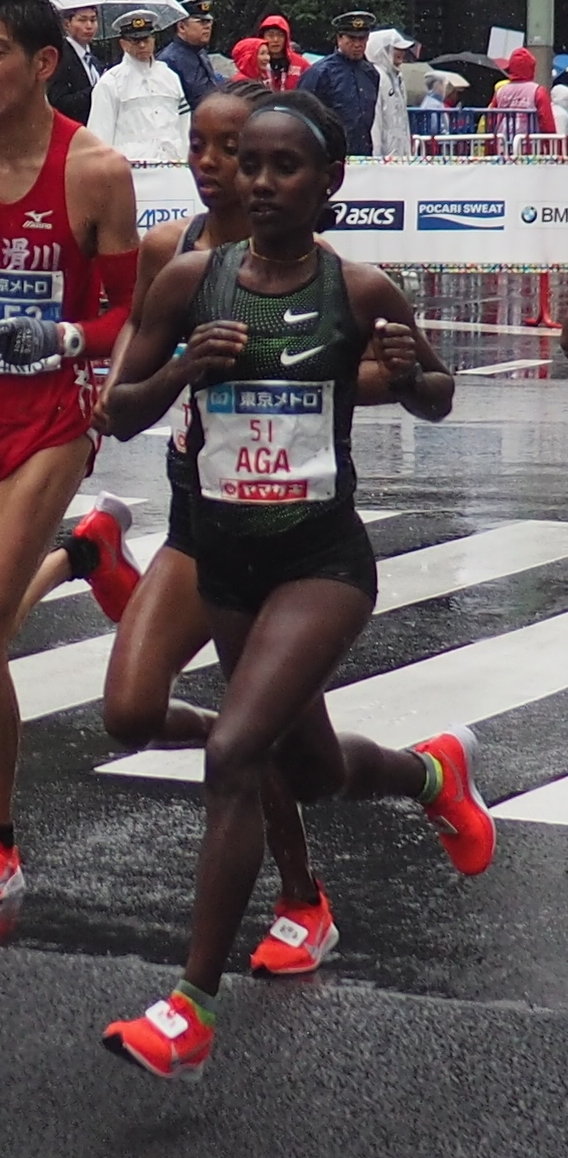
- Ruti Aga – Tokyo Marathon (2019)

Personal information
- Nationality: Ethiopian
- Born: 16 January 1994 (age 32)

Sport
- Country: Ethiopia
- Sport: Athletics
- Events: Marathon, Half marathon
- Turned pro: 2016
Medal record
Women's athletics
Representing Ethiopia
World U20 Championships
Silver medal – second place	2012 Barcelona	5000 m
African U20 Championships
Gold medal – first place	2013 Bambous	5000 m
World Marathon Majors
Gold medal – first place	2019 Tokyo	Marathon
Silver medal – second place	2017 Berlin	Marathon
Silver medal – second place	2018 Tokyo	Marathon
Silver medal – second place	2018 Berlin	Marathon
Bronze medal – third place	2016 Berlin	Marathon
Bronze medal – third place	2019 New York	Marathon

Ruti Aga (born 16 January 1994) is an Ethiopian long-distance runner. She won the women's race at the 2019 Tokyo Marathon and secured five other top three finishes at the World Marathon Majors.

In 2012, Aga won the silver medal in the women's 5000 metres at the 2012 World Junior Championships in Athletics held in Barcelona, Spain. In 2013, she finished in fifth place in the junior women's race at the 2013 IAAF World Cross Country Championships staged in Bydgoszcz, Poland. The same year, she won the gold medal in the women's 5000 metres at the 2013 African Junior Athletics Championships in Bambous, Mauritius.

Aga competed in the women's marathon event at the 2019 World Athletics Championships.

In October 2026, Aga was suspended for six years by the Athletics Integrity Unit after testing positive for methylprednisolone along with tampering with anti-doping protocols.

== Personal bests ==
- 5000 metres – 15:13.48 (Shanghai 2013)
- 10,000 metres – 33:38.39 (Addis Ababa 2013)

Road

- 5 kilometres – 15:46 (Rennes 2014)
- 10 kilometres – 31:35 (Tilburg 2012)
- Half marathon – 1:06:39 (Houston, TX 2018)
- Marathon – 2:18:34 (Berlin 2018)
