= 2012 African Cross Country Championships =

II Africa Cross Country Championships
- Organisers: CAA
- Edition: 2nd
- Date: 18 March 2012
- Host city: Cape Town, South Africa
- Events: 4
- Participation: 160 athletes from 21 nations

The 2nd African Cross Country Championships was an international cross country running competition for African athletes which was held on 18 March 2012 in Cape Town's Keurboom Park in South Africa. Organised by the Confederation of African Athletics and Athletics South Africa, it was the first time that the competition represented that year's foremost event in the sport, as the IAAF World Cross Country Championships was not held. Twenty-one nations entered athletes into the event and 160 runners participated in the races.

There were four championship races held at the event, featuring senior and junior races for men and women. The senior races were won by Kenyan athletes for a second year running, with Clement Langat and Joyce Chepkirui taking the men's and women's titles, respectively. Kenya also won the women's junior race through Faith Kipyegon, while Ethiopia took the men's junior title as Muktar Edris won that race. Kenya won both team races in the senior categories and also the men's junior team title. The Ethiopian junior women broke the Kenyan dominance of the event by winning that team title, although Kenya were one runner short of a team and swept the individual medals.

== Medallists ==
=== Individual ===
| Event | Gold | | Silver | | Bronze | |
|---|---|---|---|---|---|---|
| Senior men's 12 km | Clement Kiprono Langat (KEN) | 35:43 min | Teklemariam Medhin (ERI) | 35:50 min | Atsedu Tsegay Tesfay (ETH) | 36:14 min |
| Senior women's 8 km | Joyce Chepkirui (KEN) | 27:04 min | Margaret Wangari Muriuki (KEN) | 27:05 min | Emily Chebet (KEN) | 27:06 min |
| Junior men's 8 km | Muktar Edris (ETH) | 23:30 min | Japhet Kipyegon Korir (KEN) | 23:31 min | Justine Kiprop Cheruiyot (KEN) | 23:31 min |
| Junior women's 6 km | Faith Chepngetich Kipyegon (KEN) | 19:32 min | Agnes Jebet Tirop (KEN) | 19:34 min | Nancy Chepkwemoi (KEN) | 19:37 min |

=== Team ===
| Event | Gold | | Silver | | Bronze | |
|---|---|---|---|---|---|---|
| Senior men's 12 km | Kenya (KEN); Langat; Timothy Kosgei Kiptoo; Vincent Kiprop Chepkok; Fredrick Musyoki Ndunge | 2:26:11 | Eritrea (ERI); Medhin; Kidane Tadesse; Nassir Dawud; Mulue Andom | 2:27:47 | Ethiopia (ETH); Tesfay; Ayele Megerssa Feyisa; Abere Chane Lema; Chalachew Asmamaw Tiruneh | 2:27:53 |
| Senior women's 8 km | Kenya (KEN); Chepkirui; Muriuki; Chebet; Esther Chemtai Ndiema | 1:48:23 | Ethiopia (ETH); Belaynesh Oljira; Abebech Afework Bekele; Aberash Nesga Bedasa; Genet Yalew Kassahun | 1:50:26 | Uganda (UGA); Annet Negesa; Viola Chemos; Juliet Chekwel; Nancy Chaptegei | 1:53:17 |
| Junior men's 8 km | Kenya (KEN); Korir; Cheruiyot; Cornelius Kipruto Kangogo; William Malel Sitoniki | 1:34:21 | Ethiopia (ETH); Edris; Hagos Gebrhiwot Berhe; Yitayal Atnafu Zerihu; Fikadu Haftu Tsadik | 1:34:43 | Eritrea (ERI); Ghirmay Ghebreslassie; Tesfagaber Ayahuney; Tsegay Tuemay; Dawit Weldesilasie | 1:36:51 |
| Junior women's 6 km | Ethiopia (ETH); Ruti Aga Sora; Alemitu Heroye Banata; Buze Diriba Kejela; Goitetom Gebresilass Teklegzi | 1:20:12 | Eritrea (ERI); Letekidan Gebreham; Fikadu Tsegay; Weini Kelati; Tsega Fsiha | 1:24:50 | Morocco (MAR); Khadija El Moussaoui; Fadwa Sidimadane; Fouziya El Wahrani; Soukaina Atanane | 1:30:24 |

== Participation ==
- Angola
- Benin
- Botswana
- Republic of the Congo
- Egypt
- Equatorial Guinea
- Eritrea
- Ethiopia
- Kenya
- Lesotho
- Malawi
- Mauritius
- Morocco
- Mozambique
- Namibia
- South Africa
- Rwanda
- Sudan
- Eswatini
- Uganda
- Zambia
- Zimbabwe
