= 2012 World Junior Championships in Athletics – Women's 1500 metres =

The women's 1500 metres at the 2012 World Junior Championships in Athletics will be held at the Estadi Olímpic Lluís Companys on 13 and 15 July.

== Medalists ==
Gold	Silver	Bronze
Faith Kipyegon; Kenya	Amela Terzić; Serbia	Senbere Teferi; Ethiopia

== Records ==
Prior to the competition, the existing world junior and championship records were as follows.

World Junior Record	Lang Yinglai (CHN)	3:51.34	Shanghai, China	18 October 1997
Championship Record	Liu Dong (CHN)	4:05.14	Seoul, South Korea	20 September 1992
World Junior Leading	Faith Kipyegon (KEN)	4:03.82	Shanghai, China	19 May 2012
Broken records during the 2012 World Junior Championships in Athletics
Championship Record	Faith Kipyegon (KEN)	4:04.96	Barcelona, Spain	25 July 2012

== Results ==
=== Heats ===
Qualification: The first 3 of each heat (Q) and the 3 fastest times (q) qualified

Rank	Heat	Name	Nationality	Time	Note
1	1	Faith Kipyegon	Kenya	4:10.17	Q
2	2	Senbere Teferi	Ethiopia	4:10.78	Q
3	2	Amela Terzić	Serbia	4:11.53	Q, NJ
4	3	Nancy Chepkwemoi	Kenya	4:13.43	Q
5	2	Sofia Ennaoui	Poland	4:13.68	Q, PB
6	3	Alem Embaye	Ethiopia	4:14.03	Q
7	1	Jessica Judd	Great Britain	4:14.64	Q, SB
8	1	Mary Cain	United States	4:14.77	Q
9	3	Jennifer Walsh	Great Britain	4:16.08	Q
10	2	Maruša Mišmaš	Slovenia	4:17.14	q, PB
11	1	Luminita Achim	Romania	4:18.25	q, PB
12	3	Saki Yoshimizu	Japan	4:18.30	q, PB
13	3	Frida Berge	Norway	4:18.66	PB
14	3	Nataliya Soltan	Ukraine	4:20.92	PB
15	1	Marta Pen	Portugal	4:20.95	PB
16	1	Caterina Granz	Germany	4:21.25	
17	1	Rebekah Greene	New Zealand	4:21.99	SB
18	2	Andrina Schläpfer	Switzerland	4:22.29	SB
19	2	Emine Hatun Tuna	Turkey	4:23.08	
20	1	Marta Pérez	Spain	4:23.57	PB
21	2	Jenny Blundell	Australia	4:24.35	
22	2	Lee Da-mi	South Korea	4:24.78	PB
23	2	Meropi Panagiotou	Cyprus	4:25.10	
24	3	Maria Bernard	Canada	4:25.47	
25	2	Anežka Drahotová	Czech Republic	4:26.77	PB
26	1	Choi Soo-mi	South Korea	4:28.01	
27	3	Federica Del Buono	Italy	4:28.66	
28	1	Nataliia Pryshchepa	Ukraine	4:29.00	
29	1	Sofía Pitoúli	Greece	4:29.36	
30	3	Oona Kettunen	Finland	4:29.60	
31	3	Hannah Meier	United States	4:31.20	
32	2	Zsanett Kenesei	Hungary	4:31.63	
33	3	Teodora Simovic	Serbia	4:32.22	
34	3	Beatriz Álvarez	Spain	4:34.25	
35	1	Darine Benamer	Algeria	4:40.85	
36	2	Iuliana Madalina Leonte	Romania	4:43.83	
	3	Aicha Bilal Fall	Mauritania	DNF	
	1	Winnie Nanyondo	Uganda	DNS	

=== Final ===
Rank	Order	Name	Nationality	Time	Note
1st place, gold medalist(s)	1	Faith Kipyegon	Kenya	4:04.96	CR
2nd place, silver medalist(s)	6	Amela Terzić	Serbia	4:07.59	PB, NR
3rd place, bronze medalist(s)	7	Senbere Teferi	Ethiopia	4:08.28	PB
4	9	Nancy Chepkwemoi	Kenya	4:09.72	
5	10	Jessica Judd	GBR	4:09.93	PB
6	3	Mary Cain	USA	4:11.01	PB NHSR
7	12	Axumawit Embaye	Ethiopia	4:12.92	PB
8	8	Jennifer Walsh	GBR	4:12.96	PB
9	4	Maruša Mišmaš	SLO	4:14.96	PB
10	5	Sofia Ennaoui	POL	4:15.23	
11	11	Saki Yoshimizu	JPN	4:16.84	PB
12	2	Luminita Achim	ROU	4:22.07	

== Participation ==
According to an unofficial count, 37 athletes from 28 countries participated in the event.

- Algeria (1)
- Australia (1)
- Canada (1)
- Cyprus (1)
- Czech Republic (1)
- Ethiopia (2)
- Finland (1)
- Germany (1)
- Greece (1)
- Hungary (1)
- Italy (1)
- Japan (1)
- Kenya (2)
- Mauritania (1)
- New Zealand (1)
- Norway (1)
- Poland (1)
- Portugal (1)
- Romania (2)
- Serbia (2)
- Slovenia (1)
- South Korea (2)
- Spain (2)
- Switzerland (1)
- Turkey (1)
- Ukraine (2)
- United Kingdom (2)
- United States (2)
