= 2012 World Junior Championships in Athletics – Women's 5000 metres =

The women's 5000 metres at the 2012 World Junior Championships in Athletics was held at the Estadi Olímpic Lluís Companys on 11 July.

== Medalists ==
Gold	Buze Diriba; Ethiopia
Silver	Ruti Aga; Ethiopia
Bronze	Agnes Jebet Tirop; Kenya

== Records ==
Prior to the competition, the existing world junior and championship records were as follows.

World Junior Record	Tirunesh Dibaba (ETH)	14:30.88	Bergen, Norway	11 June 2004
Championship Record	Genzebe Dibaba (ETH)	15:08.06	Moncton, Canada	21 July 2010
World Junior Leading	Buze Diriba (ETH)	15:11.53	Montreuil, France	5 June 2012

== Results ==
Rank	Name	Nationality	Time	Note
1st place, gold medalist(s)	Buze Diriba	Ethiopia	15:32.94	
2nd place, silver medalist(s)	Ruti Aga	Ethiopia	15:32.95	PB
3rd place, bronze medalist(s)	Agnes Jebet Tirop	Kenya	15:36.74	PB
4	Cayla Hatton	United States	15:50.32	PB
5	Caroline Chepkoech Kipkirui	Kenya	15:58.10	
6	Alena Kudashkina	Russia	16:05.64	
7	Monica Madalina Florea	Romania	16:08.07	PB
8	Allison Woodward	United States	16:08.29	PB
9	Nancy Cheptegei	Uganda	16:15.49	PB
10	Wu Xufeng	China	16:19.84	
11	Shiori Yano	Japan	16:21.29	
12	Moe Kyuma	Japan	16:21.36	
13	Li Zhixuan	China	16:24.29	PB
14	Kim Do-yeon	South Korea	16:27.62	
15	Irene van Lieshout	Netherlands	16:38.68	
16	Jip Vastenburg	Netherlands	16:47.32	
17	Anca Maria Bunea	Romania	16:51.53	
18	Aminata Olowoora	Nigeria	17:59.79	
–	Emelia Gorecka	Great Britain	–	DNS

== Participation ==
According to an unofficial count, 18 athletes from 11 countries participated in the event.

- China (2)
- Ethiopia (2)
- Japan (2)
- Kenya (2)
- Netherlands (2)
- Nigeria (1)
- Romania (2)
- Russia (1)
- South Korea (1)
- Uganda (1)
- United States (2)
