= 2014 World Junior Championships in Athletics – Women's 5000 metres =

The women's 5000 metres at the 2014 World Junior Championships in Athletics will be held at Hayward Field on 23 July.

== Medalists ==
Gold	Alemitu Heroye; Ethiopia
Silver	Alemitu Hawi; Ethiopia
Bronze	Agnes Jebet Tirop; Kenya

== Records ==
Standing records prior to the 2014 World Junior Championships in Athletics
World Junior Record	Tirunesh Dibaba (ETH)	14:30.88	Bergen, Norway	11 June 2004
Championship Record	Genzebe Dibaba (ETH)	15:08.06	Moncton, Canada	21 July 2010
World Junior Leading	Alemitu Heroye (ETH)	14:52.67	Rome, Italy	5 June 2014
Broken records during the 2014 World Junior Championships in Athletics

== Results ==
=== Final ===
Place	Bib #	Athlete	Nationality	Time	Notes
1	571	Alemitu Heroye	Ethiopia	15:10.08	
2	572	Alemitu Hawi	Ethiopia	15:10.46	PB
3	993	Agnes Jebet Tirop	Kenya	15:43.12	
4	1495	Stella Chesang	Uganda	15:53.85	NJR
5	983	Loice Chemnung	Kenya	15:55.17	
6	953	Maki Izumida	Japan	15:55.26	
7	184	Courtney Powell	Australia	15:56.00	PB
8	957	Fuyuka Kimura	Japan	15:59.72	
9	347	Jillian Forsey	Canada	16:02.55	PB
10	994	Darya Maslova	Kyrgyzstan	16:07.58	NJR
11	188	Kate Spencer	Australia	16:18.18	
12	1619	Maggie Schmaedick	United States	16:19.01	
13	352	Heather Petrick	Canada	16:26.04	
	1488	Emine Hatun Tuna	Turkey	DNF	
	1400	Sarah Lahti	Sweden	DNF	
