= Solomon Kirwa Yego =

Kenyan long-distance runner

Medal record

Men's athletics

Representing Kenya

African Cross Country Championships
| Gold medal – first place | 2014 Kampala | Team |

Solomon Kirwa Yego (born 1987) is a Kenyan long-distance runner who competes mainly in road running competitions. His half marathon best of 58:44 minutes makes him the ninth fastest man ever for the distance. Yego has won the Roma-Ostia Half Marathon and the Udine Half Marathon. He represented Kenya at the 2014 African Cross Country Championships and won a team gold medal.

== Career ==
Yego began competing in half marathons in Italy in 2010, taking top three finishes at a variety of lower level races. He won the Collemar and Castellana Marathons in 2011, setting a best of 2:17:47 hours at the latter. He demonstrated his move into world class distance running in the 2012 season with a run of 61:49 minutes to win the Ferrara Half Marathon. Later in the year he won the Europa Half Marathon then won the Borghi and Cremona Half Marathon, improving his time to 61:34 minutes in the process. He began to near the global top 100 runners that season.

He missed most of the 2013 season, but managed a runner-up finish at the high level Route du Vin Half Marathon. A fifth-place finish at the Kenyan Cross Country Championships in 2014 led to his first international selection, for the 2014 African Cross Country Championships. His fourth-place finish helped the Kenyan men to the team title with a clean sweep. He took part in French road races that year, coming in the top five at the Le Lion Half Marathon and the Marseille-Cassis Classique Internationale.

Yego continued his gradual improvement into 2015. He won the Lago Maggiore Half Marathon in a best of 60:47 minutes at the start of the year then won the Udine Half Marathon in 60:04 minutes in September. He ended the year with a second career win in Cremona. He placed 32nd on the seasonal world lists for the half marathon. He broke into the world's best ever at the 2016 Roma-Ostia Half Marathon, recording a time of 58:44 minutes to become the third fastest man for the half marathon, with only world record holder Zersenay Tadese and former Olympic champion Samuel Wanjiru having run faster. The run bettered former world champion Wilson Kiprop's course record by over half a minute.

== International competitions ==
| Year | Competition | Venue | Position | Event | Notes |
|---|---|---|---|---|---|
| 2014 | African Cross Country Championships | Kampala, Uganda | 4th | Senior men | 35:15 |
| 2014 | African Cross Country Championships | Kampala, Uganda | 1st | Team | 10 pts |

== Circuit wins ==
- Roma-Ostia Half Marathon: 2016
- Udine Half Marathon: 2015
- Lago Maggiore Half Marathon: 2015
- Cremona Half Marathon: 2012, 2015

== Personal bests ==
- 5000 metres – 14:14.54 min (2012)
- 10,000 metres – 28:23.0 min (2015)
- 10K run – 29:06 min (2015)
- Half marathon – 58:44 min (2016)
- Marathon – 2:08:31 (2016)

Info from All-Athletics
