= Natalia Hawthorn =

Canadian long-distance runner

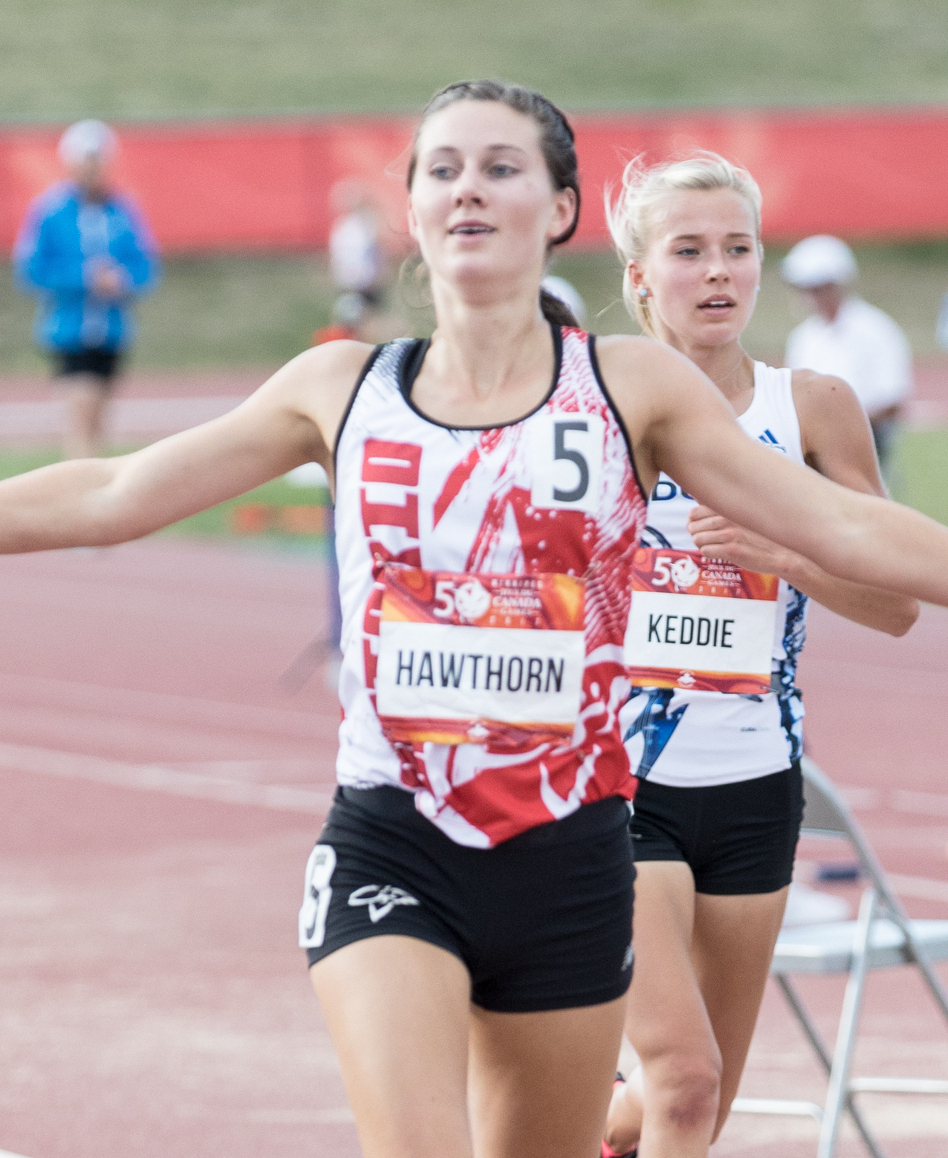
- Hawthorn in 2017

Personal information
- Born: January 12, 1995 (age 31)

Sport
- Country: Canada
- Sport: Long-distance running

Natalia Allen (née Hawthorn; born January 12, 1995) is a Canadian long-distance runner. She competed in the women's 1500 metres event at the 2020 Summer Olympics held in Tokyo, Japan. In 2019, she competed in the senior women's race at the 2019 IAAF World Cross Country Championships. She finished in 86th place.

In 2013, she competed in the junior women's race at the 2013 IAAF World Cross Country Championships held in Bydgoszcz, Poland.

In 2019, she won the silver medal in the senior women's team event at the 2019 NACAC Cross Country Championships. In the senior women's individual event she finished in 16th place.
