= Kipyego =

Kipyego is a surname of Kenyan origin that may refer to:

- Barnabas Kipyego (born 1995), Kenyan steeplechase runner
- Barselius Kipyego (born 1993), Kenyan long-distance runner
- Bernard Kipyego (born 1986), Kenyan marathon runner
- Christopher Kipyego (born 1975). Kenyan marathon runner
- Edwin Kipyego (born 1990), Kenyan half marathon runner
- Michael Kipyego (born 1983), Kenyan steeplechase and marathon runner
- Sally Kipyego (born 1985), Kenyan Olympic 10,000 metres medallist

== See also ==
- Yego
