= 2014 African Cross Country Championships =

III Africa Cross Country Championships
- Organisers: CAA
- Edition: 3rd
- Date: 16 March 2014
- Host city: Kampala, Uganda
- Events: 4
- Participation: ? athletes from 26 nations

The 2014 African Cross Country Championships was the third edition of the international cross country running competition for African athletes organised by the Confederation of African Athletics. It was held on 16 March at the Kololo Golf Course in Kampala, Uganda – the first time an East African nation had hosted the event since its re-launch in 2011.

For a third successive time, Kenya dominated the event, led by men's winner Leonard Barsoton and women's winner Faith Chepngetich Kipyegon. The country won all of the senior race medals and had perfect scores in the team race, having the fourth-place finishers as well. In the junior races Moses Letoyie and Agnes Jebet Tirop similarly led the Kenyans to victory. Afewerki Berhane of Eritrea (third in the men's junior race) and Alemitu Heroye of Ethiopia (second in the women's junior race) were the only non-Kenyan individual medallists. The hosts Uganda sent full strength senior teams and came away with the men's team silver medal and the women's team bronze medal.

The event was held in close proximity to the 2014 World University Cross Country Championships, which was set in Entebbe, Uganda, one week later.

== Medallists ==
=== Individual ===
Event	Gold		Silver		Bronze	
Senior men's 12 km	Leonard Barsoton (KEN)	34:26.12	Kipruto Kangogo (KEN)	34:56.45	Rono Cherop (KEN)	35:01.88
Senior women's 8 km	Faith Chepngetich Kipyegon (KEN)	25:33.02	Janet Kisa (KEN)	25:41.30	Alice Nawowuna (KEN)	25:46.48
Junior men's 8 km	Moses Letoyie (KEN)	22:36.80	Andrew Lorot (KEN)	22:50.19	Afewerki Berhane (ERI)	22:56.45
Junior women's 6 km	Agnes Jebet Tirop (KEN)	18:50.74	Alemitu Heroye (ETH)	19:04.73	Nancy Nzisa (KEN)	19:16.18

=== Team ===
Event	Gold		Silver		Bronze	
Senior men's 12 km	Kenya (KEN); Barsoton; Kangogo; Cherop; Solomon Kirwa Yego	10	Uganda (UGA); Moses Kibet; Thomas Ayeko; Moses Kipsiro; Daniel Rotich	37	Ethiopia (ETH); Tegegne Atalay Yirsaw; Erre Seboka Negusse; Kelu Gemechu Edeo; Sraj Muhajr Haredin	52
Senior women's 8 km	Kenya (KEN); Kipyegon; Kisa; Nawowuna; Edith Chelimo	10	Ethiopia (ETH); Tadelech Bekele Alemu; Ababel Yeshaneh Birhane; Ruti Aga Sora; Shito Wudessa Osu	29	Uganda (UGA); Linet Toroitich Chebet; Nancy Cheptegei; Vanice Chemutai; Rebecca Cheptegei	57
Junior men's 8 km	Kenya (KEN); Letoyie; Lorot; John Kiprono Langat; Hillary Langat Kipkemoi	12	Eritrea (ERI); Berhane; Abraham Habte; Habtom Welday; Berhane Amanuel	32	Ethiopia (ETH); Hayato Yasin Haji; Asfaha Teshome Mekonen; Abraha Mogos Tuemay; Tegegn Hailemariyam Amare	54
Junior women's 6 km	Kenya (KEN); Tirop; Nzisa; Rosefline Chepngetich; Lilian Kasait Rengeruk	13	Ethiopia (ETH); Heroye; Amara Alemitu Hawi; Haiylu Fotyen Tesfay; Ware Shure Demise	28	Uganda (UGA); Stella Chesang; Phanice Chemutai; Patricia Chekwemoi; Karen Chekwemoi	55

== Participation ==
- Algeria
- Burundi
- Botswana
- Ivory Coast
- Cameroon
- Comoros
- Eritrea
- Ethiopia
- Gabon
- Gambia
- Guinea
- Kenya
- Madagascar
- Morocco
- Mali
- Mauritius
- Nigeria
- Rwanda
- Senegal
- Seychelles
- Somalia
- South Sudan
- Sudan
- Tanzania
- Uganda
- Zambia

== See also ==
- 2014 Asian Cross Country Championships
- 2014 European Cross Country Championships
