= Adriana Gutiérrez Colón =

Puerto Rican lawyer and politician

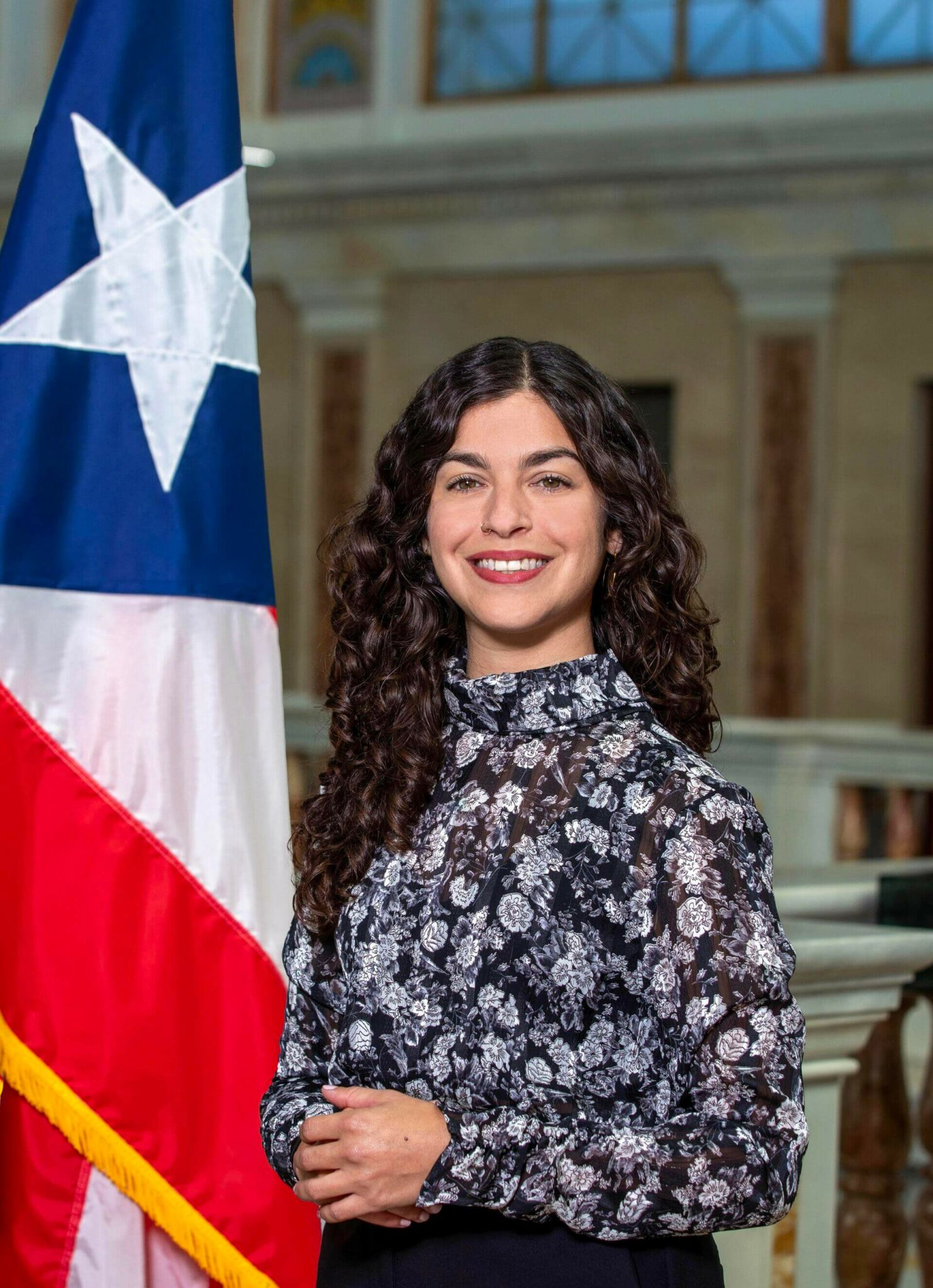

Member of the Puerto Rico House of Representatives from the at-large district
- Incumbent
- Assumed office January 2, 2025
- Constituency: At-large

Personal details
- Born: June 5, 1989 (age 37) San Juan, Puerto Rico
- Party: Puerto Rican Independence Party
- Education: University of Puerto Rico, Río Piedras Campus (BA); Interamerican University of Puerto Rico School of Law (JD); Autonomous University of Chiapas
- Occupation: Lawyer and Politician

Adriana Gutiérrez Colón (born June 5, 1989) is a Puerto Rican lawyer and politician affiliated with the Puerto Rican Independence Party (PIP). Since January 2025, she has served as an at-large member of the House of Representatives of Puerto Rico.

== Early life and education ==
Gutiérrez Colón was born on June 5, 1989, in San Juan, Puerto Rico, as the youngest of four siblings. She attended a Catholic school during her childhood.

She earned a Bachelor of Arts degree with a concentration in the History of the Americas from the University of Puerto Rico, Río Piedras Campus. She later obtained a Juris Doctor from the Interamerican University of Puerto Rico School of Law, where she was part of the Human Rights Clinic. During her law studies, she also worked as a waitress. Additionally, she completed coursework at the Autonomous University of Chiapas School of Law in Tuxtla Gutiérrez, capital of the Mexican state of Chiapas.

== Political career ==
Gutiérrez has served as a polling station official and as a legislative aide to María de Lourdes Santiago, a senator of the Senate of Puerto Rico. From 2017 to 2025, she worked in the office of Denis Márquez Lebrón, a member of the House of Representatives of Puerto Rico, as a legal adviser.

Since 2021, Gutiérrez has served as Secretary of Women's and Gender Affairs of the PIP. She is also part of the team behind the podcast *Radio Independencia*.

In the 2020 elections, Gutiérrez ran for the Senate of Puerto Rico representing the San Juan senatorial district and placed seventh. In the 2024 elections, she ran for the House of Representatives of Puerto Rico representing the 4th District under the newly formed Alianza de País between the Puerto Rican Independence Party and the Citizens' Victory Movement. Gutiérrez lost the district race to incumbent New Progressive Party representative Víctor Parés. However, under the minority representation clause of the Constitution of Puerto Rico, she secured one of the two additional at-large seats for the PIP, becoming a member of the House of Representatives.

== Electoral history ==
Year	Office	Type	Party	Votes	%	Position	Result
2020	Senator for the San Juan senatorial district	General	PIP	18,616	6.79	7th	Defeated
2024	Representative for the 4th District	General	PIP (Note: Also supported by the Citizens' Victory Movement as part of the Alliance of the Country.)	10,866	34.07	2nd	Elected (Note: Elected as an additional at-large representative.)
