= Afewerki Berhane =

Eritrean long-distance runner

Afewerki Berhane (born 6 May 1996) is an Eritrean long-distance runner.

In age-specific competitions, he finished fourth in the 10,000 metres at the 2014 World Junior Championships and thirteenth (and won a team bronze medal) in the junior race at the 2015 World Cross Country Championships.

He finished sixth in the 10,000 metres at the 2015 African Games, 19th (and 4th team-wise) at the 2017 World Cross Country Championships and 19th at the 2018 IAAF World Half Marathon Championships.

His personal best times are 13:28.39 minutes in the 5000 metres, achieved in May 2016 in Carquefou; 28:04.07 minutes in the 10,000 metres, achieved in July 2015 in San Sebastián; and 1:01:17 hours in the half marathon, achieved in November 2017 in Boulogne-Billancourt.
