= Azusa Sumi =

Japanese long-distance runner

Personal information
- Born: 12 August 1996 (age 29)

Sport
- Country: Japan
- Sport: Track and field
- Updated on 29 August 2015

Azusa Sumi (鷲見 梓沙, Sumi Azusa; born 12 August 1996) is a female long-distance runner from Japan. She competed in the Women's 5000 metres event at the 2015 World Championships in Athletics in Beijing, China.

== See also ==
- Japan at the 2015 World Championships in Athletics
