= Stuart Banda =

Malawian long-distance runner (born 1988)

Personal information
- Born: 20 November 1988 (age 37)

Sport
- Country: Malawi
- Sport: Athletics
- Event(s): 5000 m, 10,000 m
- Updated on 29 August 2015

Stuart Banda (born 20 November 1988) is a Malawian long-distance runner. He competed in the 5000 metres at the 2015 World Championships in Beijing.

Banda began training for athletics in 2013. In early 2015, Banda won the 21-kilometre Ku Chawe Mountain Race in Zomba, Malawi, setting a new course record in his debut performance at the race. Banda also won a 10,000 metres race in the lead-up to the 2015 World Athletics Championships.

Banda's Ku Chawe performance as well as his wins in other local races led to his selection to represent Malawi at the 2015 World Championships in Athletics in both the 5000 metres and the 10,000 metres, although he would only enter the 5000 m. He was sent without a coach and had to train with other African athletes. Having financial problems, Mauritius provided him with an airplane ticket.

At the 2015 World Championships, Banda was seeded in the first 5000 metres heat. He finished 18th in 14:49.31, failing to advance to the finals. He was selected to be the nation's flag-bearer at the World Championships ceremonies.

In 2018, Banda was selected for the Athletics Association of Malawi training camp to prepare for the 2018 Commonwealth Games in the 10,000 metres.

== International competitions ==
Year	Competition	Venue	Position	Event	Notes
Representing Malawi
2015	World Championships	Beijing, China	37th (h)	5000 m	14:49.31

== Personal bests ==
- 5000 metres – 14:49.31 (Beijing 2015)
