= Kenyan Cross Country Championships =

- Date: February
- Location: Nairobi, Kenya
- Event type: Cross country
- Distance: 10 km for men and women (Until 2015: 12 km for men 8 km for women); 8 km for junior men 6 km for junior women

The Kenyan Cross Country Championships is an annual cross country running competition that serves as the national championship for Kenya. It is organised by Athletics Kenya and has permit race status from the International Association of Athletics Federations. It is typically held in February in Nairobi, the country's capital, and entrants are almost exclusively from Kenya. Entrants represent their home region or one of the high level national works teams, such as Kenya Defence Forces, Kenya Police, Prisons or Universities. These teams host their own annual team championships in order to decide their selections for the national event.

Also known as the KCB Nairobi Cross, the event doubles as the national trials for international competitions, such as the IAAF World Cross Country Championships and African Cross Country Championships. Matching international programmes, four races feature at the championships: senior men's and women's races (10 km), a junior men's race (8 km) and a junior women's race (6 km). Senior men's and women's races distances had been 12 km and 8 km respectively until 2015. Athletes most often receive selection for their performances in these races, although the national governing body may opt to send athletes on their form outside of this race. A short race for senior men and women was also present on the championships' one-day programme between 1998 and 2006, as short races were contested at the annual world championships during this period.

The event attracts a very high standard of athletes, reflecting Kenya's strength in long-distance running. The growth of the championships in the 1980s coincided with the country's increasing prowess in the cross country discipline, which has seen it win all but four of the men's team world titles since 1986 and numerous women's team titles since 1990. Paul Tergat is the most successful athlete of the championships, having won the men's race on four occasions. Jane Ngotho is the most successful woman, courtesy of her three straight victories from 1988 to 1990. Rose Cheruiyot was the only athlete to win both long and short national titles in her career, taking the long race in 1995 before become short course champion in 2001.

== Past winners ==
=== Senior race ===
Year	Men's winner	Time (m:s)	Women's winner	Time (m:s)
1984	Paul Kipkoech	36:52	Esther Kiplagat	
1985	Paul Kipkoech	35:34	Helen Kimaiyo Kipkoskei	16:57
1986	John Ngugi		?	
1987	Paul Kipkoech		Leah Malot	
1988	Paul Kipkoech		Jane Ngotho	
1989	Boniface Merande		Jane Ngotho	
1990	Moses Tanui		Jane Ngotho	
1991	Andrew Masai		Pauline Konga	
1992	Paul Tergat		Hellen Kimaiyo	
1993	William Sigei		Hellen Kimaiyo	
1994	William Sigei		Tegla Loroupe	
1995	Paul Tergat		Rose Cheruiyot	
1996	Paul Tergat		Sally Barsosio	
1997	Paul Koech	35:03	Jane Omoro	27:37
1998	Paul Koech	35:56.60	Jackline Maranga	27:57.00
1999	Paul Koech		Agnes Kiprop	
2000	Paul Tergat		Lydia Cheromei	
2001	John Cheruiyot Korir		Lydia Cheromei	
2002	Richard Limo		Pamela Chepchumba	
2003	John Cheruiyot Korir	35:45	Alice Timbilil	26:56
2004	Eliud Kipchoge	35:19	Alice Timbilil	
2005	Eliud Kipchoge	34:50	Rose Jepchumba	26:30
2006	Moses Ndiema Masai	31:15.4	Evelyne Nganga	23:25.6
2007	Richard Mateelong	36:36.0	Lornah Kiplagat (NED)	27:02.4
2008	Gedion Ngatuny	38:27.6	Grace Momanyi	29:02.8
2009	Moses Mosop	38:16.0	Florence Kiplagat	28:31.4
2010	Paul Tanui	35:12.5	Linet Masai	26:43.0
2011	Geoffrey Mutai	34:35.0	Linet Masai	26:20.5
2012	Bedan Karoki Muchiri	35:19.2	Joyce Chepkirui	26:08.8
2013	Philemon Rono	35:22	Margaret Wangari Muriuki	26:47
2014	Bedan Karoki Muchiri	34:55	Faith Kipyegon	26:10
2015	Bedan Karoki Muchiri	35:08	Faith Kipyegon	26:24
2016	Geoffrey Kamworor	28:19	Alice Aprot	31:13
2017	Leonard Barsoton	28:56	Irene Cheptai	31:48
2018	Geoffrey Kamworor	28:32	Stacey Ndiwa	32:16
2019	Amos Kirui	29:51	Hellen Obiri	33:15
2020	Kibiwott Kandie	29:57.7	Sheila Chelagat	34:34.9
2021	Rodgers Kwemoi	31:04	Sheila Chelagat	34:56
2022	Samwel Chebolei Masai	29:28.9	Joyce Chepkemoi	34:00.0
2023	Charles Katul Lokir	29:16	Ruth Chepng'etich	32:56

- The fastest Kenyan in 2007 was Hellen Musyoka who was runner-up in 27:07.0 minutes.

=== Short race ===
Year	Men's winner	Women's winner
1998	John Kosgei	Gladys Agui
1999	Paul Malakwen Kosgei	Susan Chepkemei
2000	John Kibowen	Margaret Ngotho
2001	Enock Koech	Rose Cheruiyot
2002	Sammy Kipketer	Edith Masai
2003	John Kibowen	Isabella Ochichi
2004	Abraham Chebii	Beatrice Jepchumba
2005	Isaac Kiprono Songok	Priscah Jepleting Cherono
2006	Augustine Kiprono Choge	Beatrice Jepchumba

== Statistics ==
Most successful athletes

- Paul Tergat: 1992, 1995, 1996, 2000
- Paul Kipkoech: 1984, 1985, 1987, 1988
- Jane Ngotho: 1988, 1989, 1990
- Paul Koech: 1997, 1998, 1999
- Bedan Karoki Muchiri: 2012, 2014, 2015
