= Faith Kipyegon =

Kenyan middle- and long-distance runner (born 1994)

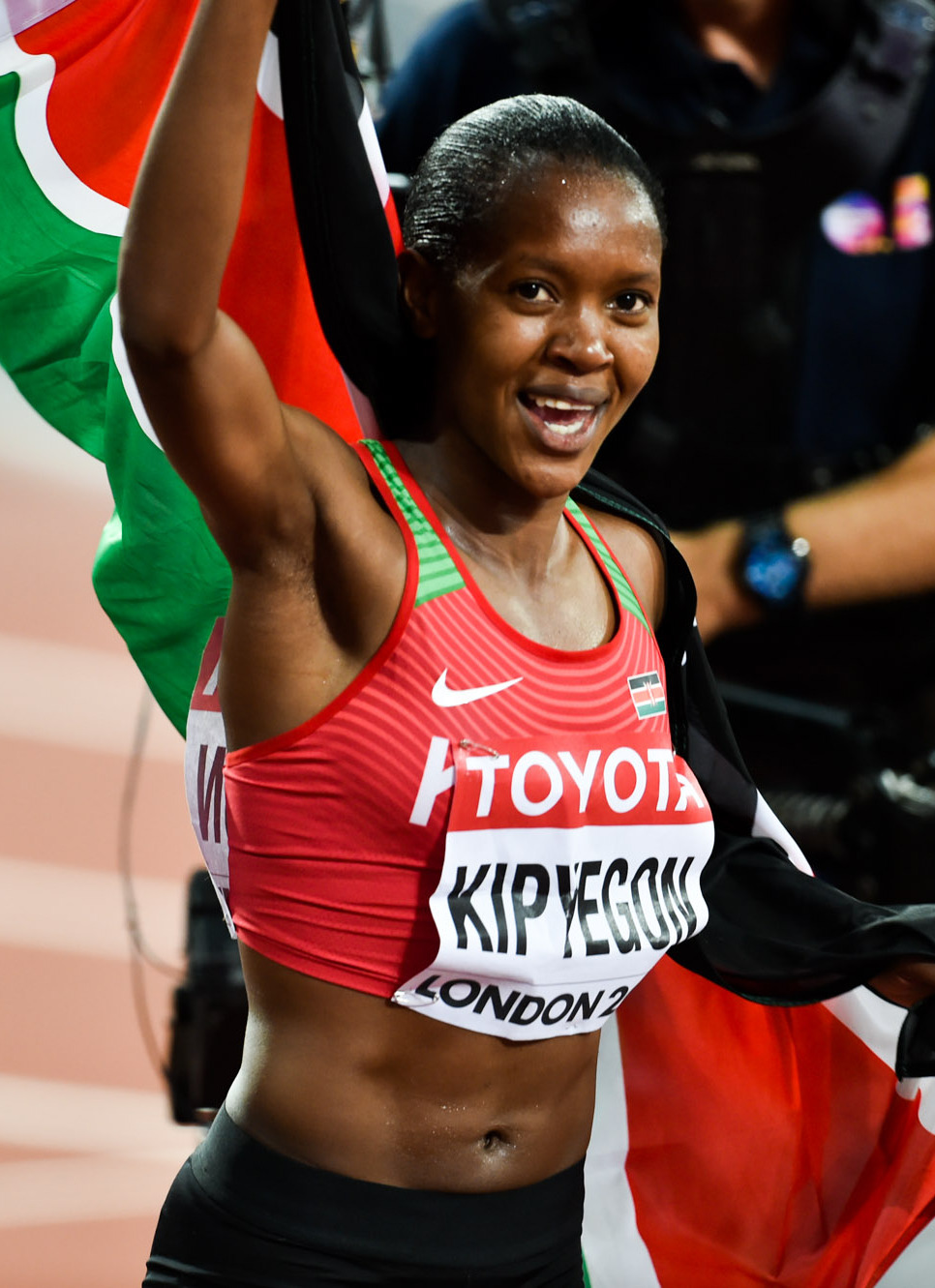
- Kipyegon at the 2017 World Championships in Athletics in London

Personal information
- Full name: Faith Chepngetich Kipyegon
- Born: 10 January 1994 (age 32) Nakuru, Rift Valley Province, Kenya
- Home town: Keringet, Nakuru County, Kenya
- Agent: Valentijn Trouw, Global Sports Communication
- Height: 1.57 m (5 ft 2 in)
- Weight: 43 kg (95 lb)

Sport
- Country: Kenya
- Sport: Athletics
- Events: 1500 metres, 5000 metres
- Coached by: Patrick Sang (2017–); Bram Som (2015–2017)

Achievements and titles
- Olympic finals: 1500 m; 2012 London, h (16th); 2016 Rio, Gold; 2020 Tokyo, Gold; 2024 Paris, Gold; 5000 m; 2024 Paris, Silver
- World finals: 1500 m; 2013 Moscow, 5th; 2015 Beijing, Silver; 2017 London, Gold; 2019 Doha, Silver; 2022 Oregon, Gold; 2023 Budapest, Gold; 2025 Tokyo, Gold; 5000 m; 2023 Budapest, Gold; 2025 Tokyo, Silver
- Highest world ranking: 1st (1500 m, 2023)
- Personal bests: 800 m: 1:57.68 (Doha 2020); 1000 m: 2:29.15 AR (Monaco 2020); 1500 m: 3:48.68 WR (Eugene 2025); Mile: 4:07.64 WR (Monaco 2023); Mile: 4:06.91 (Note: Time set in a non-record eligible exhibition event) (Paris 2025); 3000 m: 8:07.04 AR (Chorzów 2025); 5000 m: 14:05.20 (Paris 2023)
Medal record
Women's athletics
Representing Kenya
Olympic Games
Gold medal – first place	2016 Rio de Janeiro	1500 m
Gold medal – first place	2020 Tokyo	1500 m
Gold medal – first place	2024 Paris	1500 m
Silver medal – second place	2024 Paris	5000 m
World Championships
Gold medal – first place	2017 London	1500 m
Gold medal – first place	2022 Eugene	1500 m
Gold medal – first place	2023 Budapest	1500 m
Gold medal – first place	2023 Budapest	5000 m
Gold medal – first place	2025 Tokyo	1500 m
Silver medal – second place	2015 Beijing	1500 m
Silver medal – second place	2019 Doha	1500 m
Silver medal – second place	2025 Tokyo	5000 m
World Relays
Gold medal – first place	2014 Nassau	4 × 1500 m
Diamond League
First place	2017	1500 m
First place	2021	1500 m
First place	2022	1500 m
First place	2023	1500 m
First place	2024	1500 m
Commonwealth Games
Gold medal – first place	2014 Glasgow	1500 m
World Junior Championships
Gold medal – first place	2012 Barcelona	1500 m
World Youth Championships
Gold medal – first place	2011 Villeneuve-d'Ascq	1500 m
World Cross Country Championships
Gold medal – first place	2010 Bydgoszcz	Junior team
Gold medal – first place	2011 Punta Umbria	Junior race
Gold medal – first place	2013 Bydgoszcz	Junior race
Gold medal – first place	2013 Bydgoszcz	Junior team
Gold medal – first place	2017 Kampala	Senior team
Silver medal – second place	2011 Punta Umbria	Junior team
World Road Running Championships
Bronze medal – third place	2023 Riga	1 mile
African Cross Country Championships
Gold medal – first place	2012 Cape Town	Junior race
Gold medal – first place	2014 Kampala	Senior race
Gold medal – first place	2014 Kampala	Senior team

Faith Chepngetich Kipyegon (born 10 January 1994) is a Kenyan middle and long-distance runner. Kipyegon is the world record holder for the 1500 metres and the mile, and she is the former world record holder for the 5000 metres. Kipyegon is the only three-time Olympic champion in the 1500 metres, having won a gold medal each at the 2016 Rio de Janeiro, 2020 Tokyo, and the 2024 Paris Olympics. She also won a gold medal in the 1500 metres at the 2017, 2022, 2023 and 2025 World Championships and in the 5000 metres at the 2023 World Championships.

At the 2024 Paris Olympics, Kipyegon became the first athlete ever to win three consecutive gold medals in the 1500 m women's race, where she also set a new Olympic record. In addition to the 1500 m, she had previously earned a silver medal in the women's 5000 m, after successfully appealing a disqualification.

As a junior, Kipyegon won gold medals at the 2011 and 2013 World Cross Country Championships and in the 1500 m at the 2011 World Youth Championships and the 2012 World Junior Championships. Kipyegon is one of only eleven athletes (Note: Along with Valerie Adams, Usain Bolt, Veronica Campbell-Brown, Armand Duplantis, Jacques Freitag, Yelena Isinbayeva, Kirani James, Jana Pittman, Dani Samuels, and David Storl) to win world championship titles at the youth, junior, and senior levels of an athletic event.

Kipyegon was cited as one of the Top 100 most influential Africans by New African magazine in 2017. On 21 November 2024, the University of Eldoret conferred its first honorary degree on Kipyegon in recognition of her accomplishments and for her "humility and grace."

== Early life and background ==
Kipyegon was the eighth of nine children growing up on a farm in a village near Keringet, Nakuru County in the Kenyan Rift Valley. She comes from the Kalenjin tribe. Her elder sister and former training partner Beatrice Mutai is a 10 km and half marathon specialist. Her father Samuel Kipyegon Koech was a 400 m and 800 m runner in his youth, while her mother Linah Koech also had contact with athletics. Faith was a football player until she was introduced to athletics at school aged 14. She lined up for a one-kilometre run in P.E. class and won that race by 20 metres. She attended Winners Girls High School in Keringet.

== Personal life and coach ==
Kipyegon is married to middle-distance runner Timothy Kitum, the 2012 Olympic 800 m bronze medallist. They have a daughter, Alyn, born in June 2018.

She trains in Kaptagat (and Kapsabet) and has been coached since the end of 2017 by Patrick Sang, triple global 3000 m steeplechase silver medallist, who is also coaching marathon world record-holder Eliud Kipchoge. Up until 2017, Kipyegon was coached by former Dutch athlete Piet de Peuter.

== Junior career ==
In 2010, at age 16, a barefooted Kipyegon made her international debut at the World Cross Country Championships held in Bydgoszcz, Poland, competing against athletes up to three years her senior. She placed fourth in the women's junior race as the youngest finisher in the top 21, and won the gold medal with her under-20 team (it was a Kenyan 1–4 sweep). Later that year, she showed her track potential by finishing third in the 1500 metres at the Kenyan World Junior Championship Trials in Nairobi.

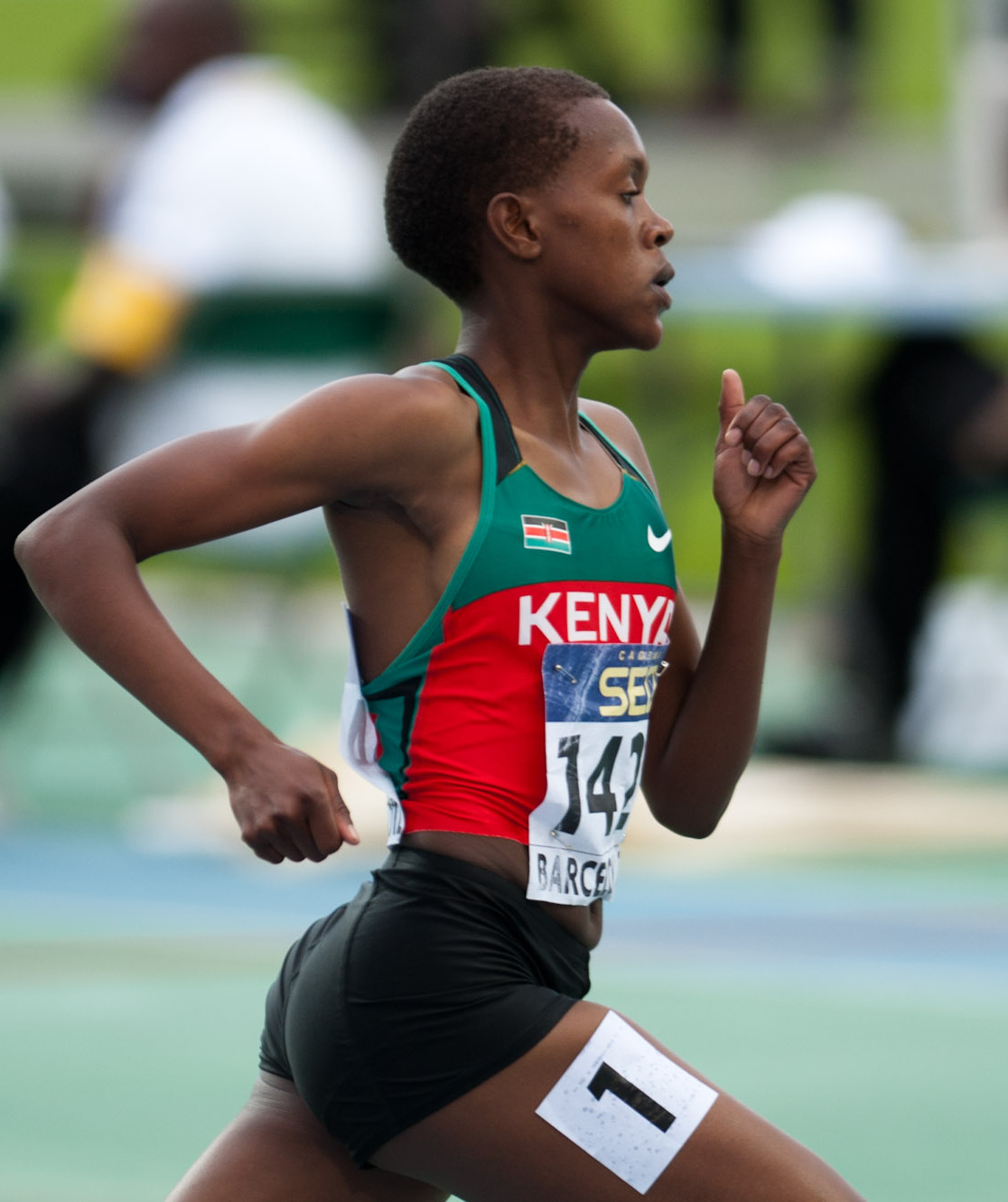
Kipyegon at the 2012 World Junior Championships in Barcelona.

Running barefoot again, Kipyegon improved by two places and won the individual gold medal at the 2011 edition in Punta Umbria, Spain, adding a silver with her team. A few months later, she raced the 1500 m at the World Youth Championships in Villeneuve-d'Ascq, France, taking the women's crown, ahead of two Ethiopian runners with a time of 4:09.48, breaking the championship record in the process.

Her 2012 season started with a bang as, after the 800 metres race in April, she set a swift national junior 1500 m record of 4:03.82 at the Shanghai Diamond League meeting (5th) the following month. In June, the 18-year-old won the event at the Kenyan Junior Athletics Championships, and finished third at the Kenyan Olympic Trials to secure a spot on the national team for the 2012 Olympic Games in London. At the World Junior Championships held in July in Barcelona, she ran a championship record again to claim gold in her specialist event significantly ahead of the field with a time of 4:04.96; Serbian Amela Terzić and Ethiopian Senbere Teferi took second and third place respectively. She placed ninth in her heat at the London Olympics in August in a time of 4:08.78 (sixth after later doping disqualifications), failing to advance to the semi-finals.

At the beginning of the 2013 season, she defended her junior title at the World Cross Country Championships in Bydgoszcz (PL). On 10 May, at the Diamond League meeting in Doha, Qatar, she broke for the first time the 4-minute barrier in the 1500 m, clocking an African U20 and Kenyan senior record of 3:56.98. Kipyegon finished second behind Swedish runner Abeba Aregawi but beat Ethiopia's Genzebe Dibaba in third. In August, at the Moscow World Championships, the 19-year-old came fifth in the final in a time of 4:05.08.

== Senior career ==
=== 2014: Commonwealth champion ===
In March, she claimed victory in the senior women's race (8 km) at the African Cross Country Championships held in Kampala, Uganda, beating the silver medallist by more than eight seconds. In May, she was a member of the team which won the gold medal in the 4 × 1500 m relay at the first IAAF World Relays in Nassau, Bahamas, along with Mercy Cherono, Irene Jelagat and Hellen Obiri. The Kenyan team, ahead of the United States and Australia, set a new world record of 16:33.58. That same year in July, Kipyegon took her first senior 1500 m victory, becoming the Glasgow Commonwealth Games champion in Scotland with a time of 4:08.94. The 20-year-old finished fifth over the distance, however, at the African Championships staged in Marrakesh, Morocco in August, clocking 4:13.46.

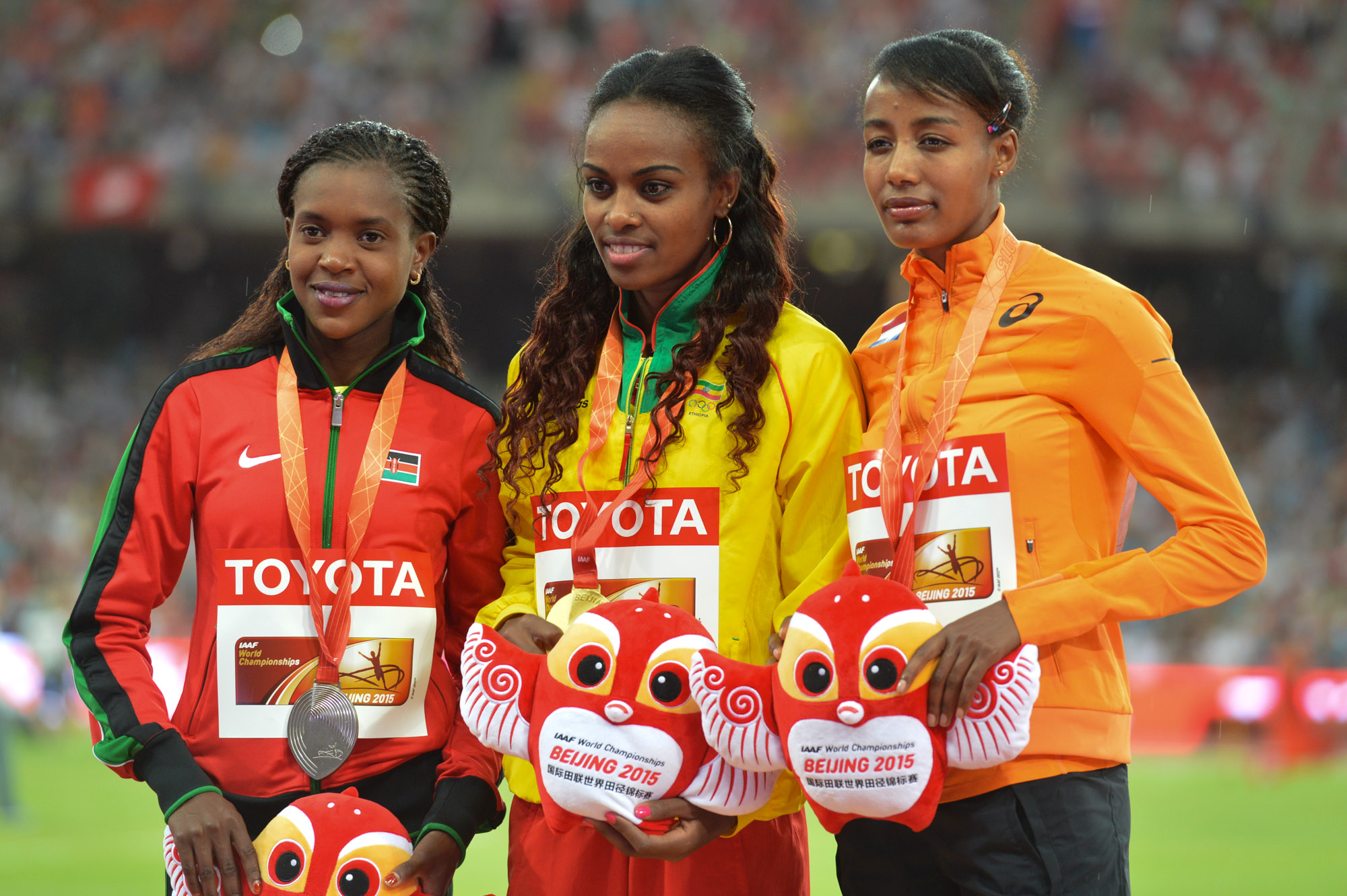
Faith Kipyegon (L) collecting her first individual senior global medal, a silver for the 1500 m, at the 2015 World Championships in Beijing.

=== 2015: World championship silver medallist ===
On 25 August, Kipyegon won a silver in the 1500 m event at the World Championships held in Beijing. After a tactical race, she finished second in a time of 4:08.96 behind only then fresh world record holder Genzebe Dibaba who clocked 4:08.09. Sifan Hassan representing the Netherlands was third in 4:09.34.

On 11 September, she secured her first Diamond League victory, winning the mile race in Brussels. It was a notable success, as she set a meeting and African record of 4:16.71, beating Hassan who ran 4:18.20 in the final stretch.

=== 2016: First Olympic title in Rio ===
Kipyegon's Olympic campaign kicked off to a strong start on 14 May, racing the 1500 m at the Shanghai Diamond League. She improved her own 2013 Kenyan record to 3:56.82 for the win, also setting the meeting record. Two weeks later, she repeated all these feats at the Eugene Diamond Race meet in Oregon, USA, lowering her national record to 3:56.41. She also notched up victory in the mile event at the Oslo Diamond League in June.

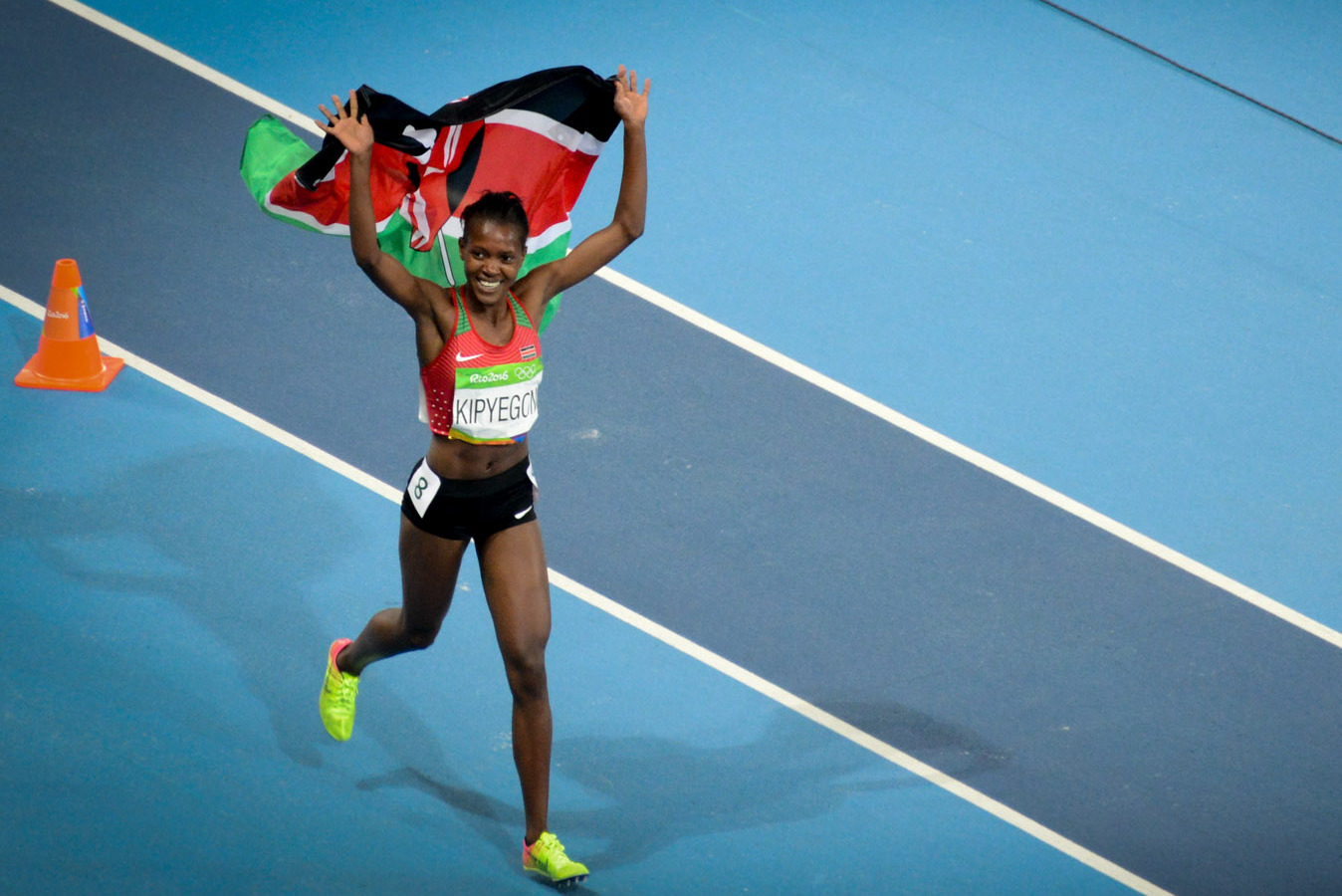
Kipyegon celebrates her first Olympic 1500 m victory in 2016 in Rio de Janeiro.

The then 22-year-old became the Olympic 1500 m champion in Rio de Janeiro, avenging her loss to Dibaba in the previous year's World Championships. She outsprinted Dibaba in the final 200 m in what was initially a very slow tactical race, with a third lap in 56.80 and last 800 m in a fast 800 m races pace of 1:57.2. Kipyegon clocked 4:08.92, Dibaba 4:10.27 and Jenny Simpson was third in 4:10.53.

=== 2017: First senior world title ===
Kipyegon earned her first Diamond League 1500 m Trophy, winning three races in Shanghai, Eugene and Brussels. It was the first season of the series to feature the new championship-style system in which overall event winners are determined only by the results of the final meet. Kipyegon outsprinted her rival Sifan Hassan at the Brussels Final in September, 3:57.04 to 3:57.22.

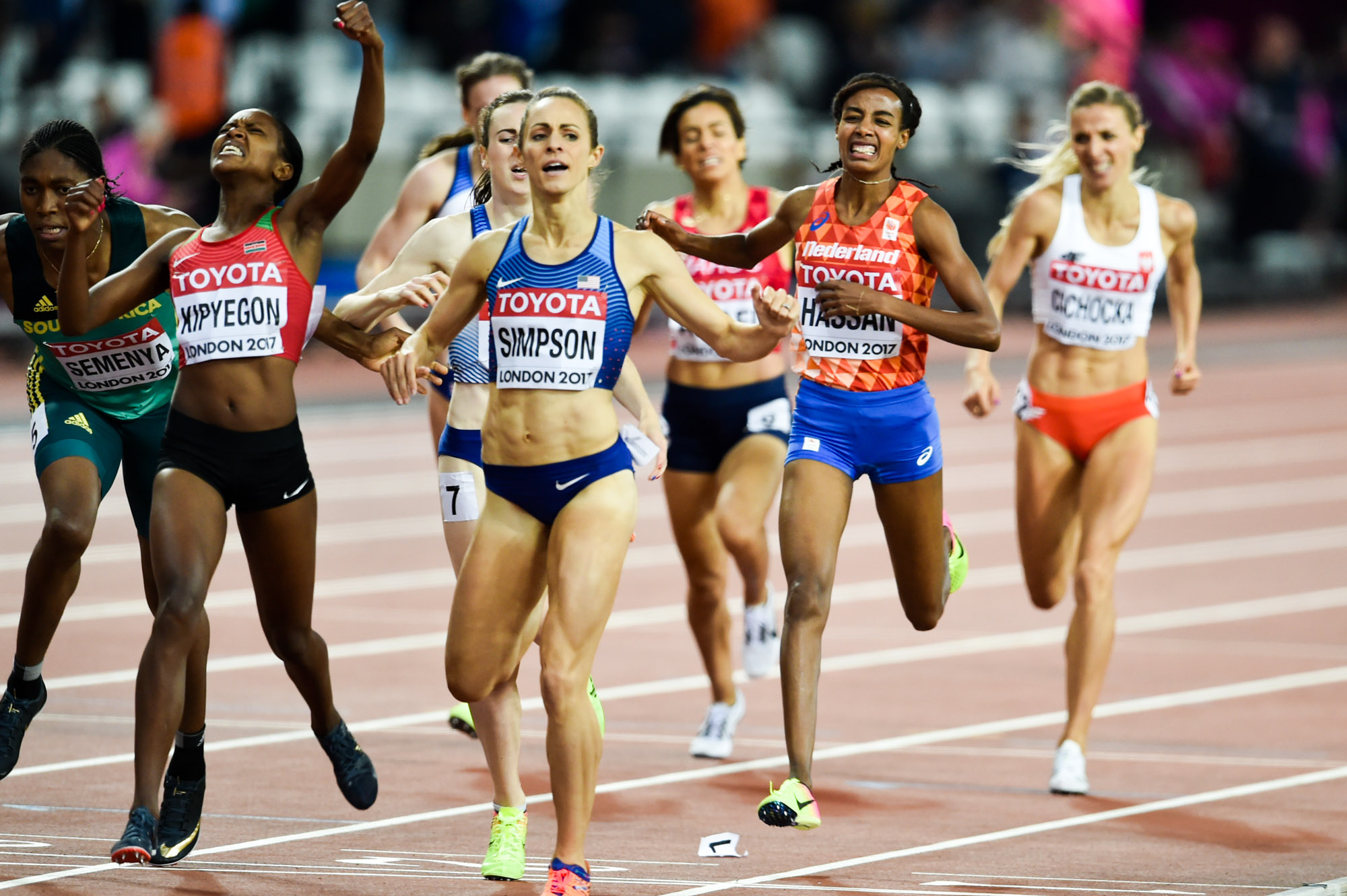
At the 2017 World Championships in London, Kipyegon (L in red) won her first senior world title, beating, 2–5, Jenny Simpson, Caster Semenya, Laura Muir and Sifan Hassan.

Her best success of that year was the first place at the London World Championships in August, becoming the first Kenyan female world 1500 m champion and only the third woman in history to win both the Olympic and World Championships finals over the distance. The 23-year-old ran 4:02.59 while a further three women also recorded times below 4:03, with Jenny Simpson in second and Caster Semenya in third. "I won the Olympics in 2016 but the victory at the World Championships in 2017 was sweeter because I fought the hardest. In 2016 Rio, I was only wary of Genzebe Dibaba of Ethiopia because I had a fantastic season. In London, Caster Semenya, Dibaba, Sifan Hassan, Laura Muir and Jennifer Simpson were all gold medal prospects." Kipyegon said.

At this point she decided to start a family.

=== 2018–2020: Motherhood and comeback, world championship silver medallist ===
Kipyegon followed her doctor's advice and trained until she was between four and five months pregnant. She gave birth to her first child, a daughter Alyn, in June 2018 by a caesarean section due to the wrong position of her baby. Kipyegon returned to training in January 2019 after an almost 18-month break. At the end of June six months later, 12 months after the childbirth, she made her racing comeback in style, winning her specialty in 3:59:04 at the Eugene Diamond League, the Prefontaine Classic, held that year in Palo Alto.

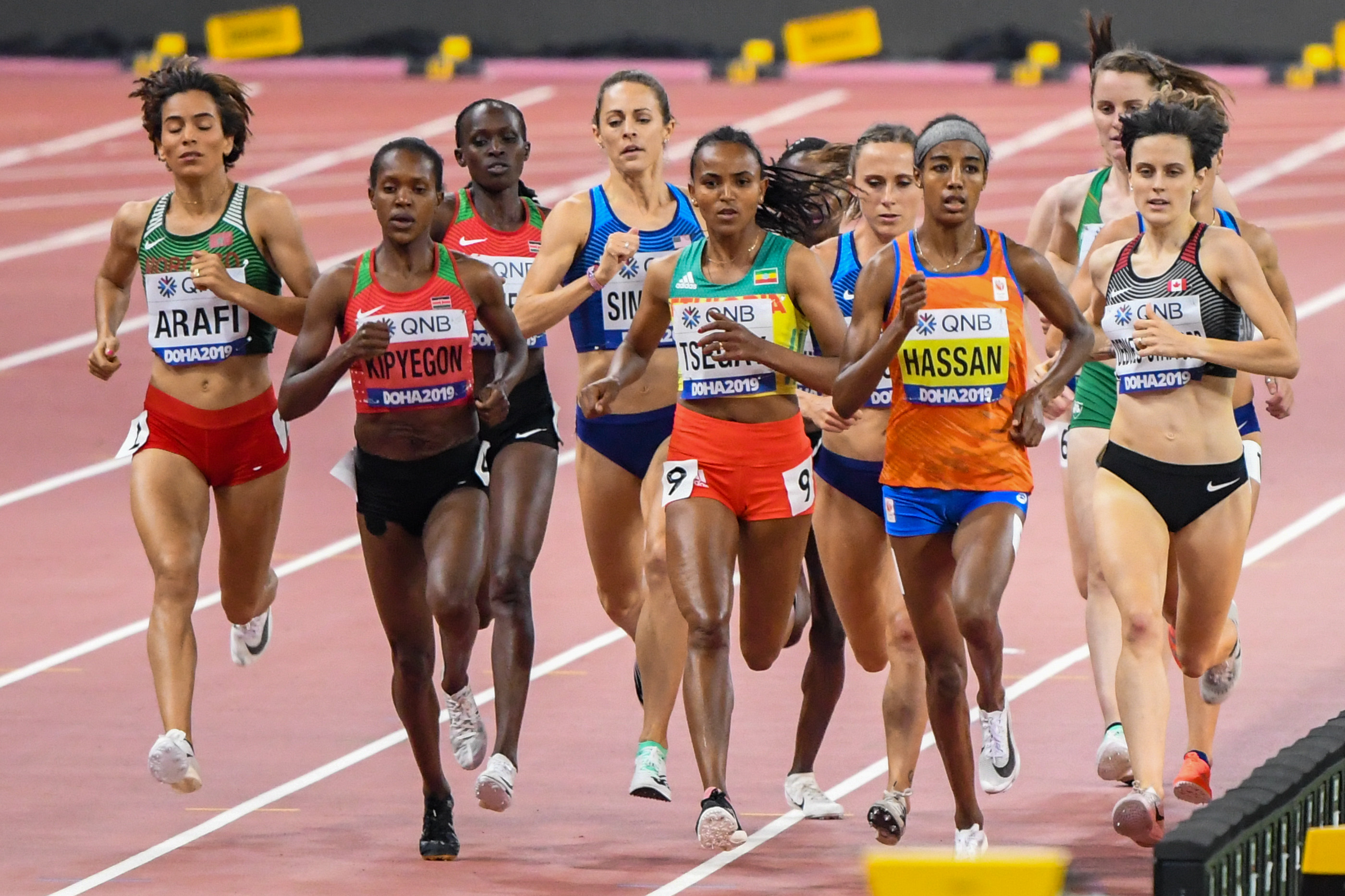
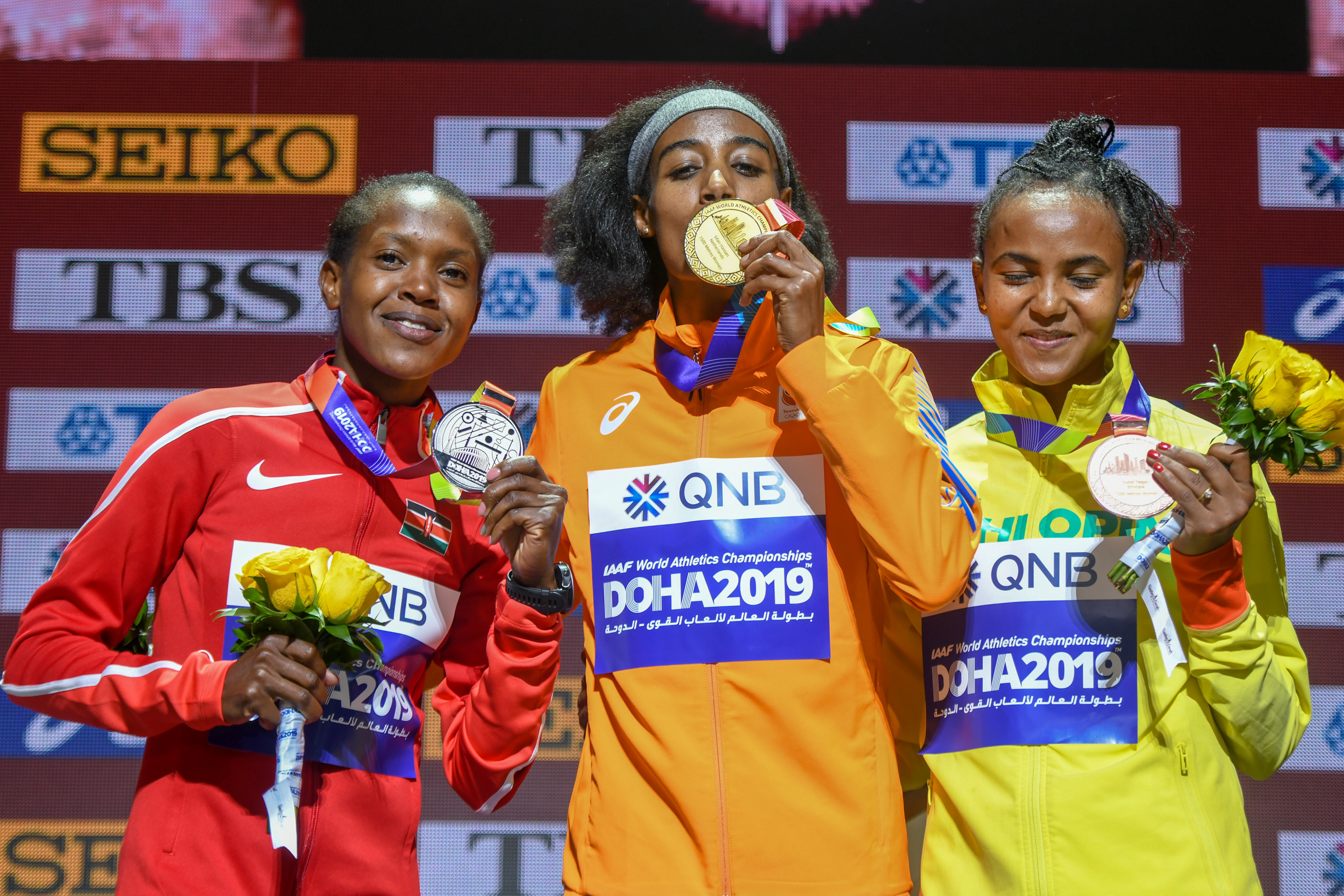
In the 1500 m final at the 2019 Doha World Championships, Faith (L in red) lost only to Sifan Hassan, returning after giving birth in the previous year.

Kipyegon went on to take the silver medal at the World Championships in Doha, where she chopped more than two seconds from her 2016 Kenyan record in the final with a time of 3:54.22. Sifan Hassan came first in 3:51.95 while third-placed Gudaf Tsegay set a personal best of 3:54.38.

In 2020, she competed at the Diamond League and Continental Tour meetings staying unbeaten in all her six races. In August, she ran the second-fastest time ever, an African and Diamond League record in the 1000 metres at the Herculis meet in Monaco, with her result of 2:29.15 just 0.17 s short of the world record set back in 1996 by Svetlana Masterkova.

=== 2021: Second back-to-back Olympic title in Tokyo ===
In 2021, Kipyegon greatly improved her 2019 Kenyan national record at the Diamond League meetings. On 10 June, she ran 3:53.91 at the Rome Golden Gala, staged in Florence, to finish second just behind Sifan Hassan who clocked 3:53.63. On 9 July at the Monaco Herculis, Kipyegon chopped nearly three seconds from that mark for a win, stopping the clock at a world-leading 3:51.07 – the fourth-fastest female performance in history at the time and just one second off Genzebe Dibaba's world record, which was also set in Monaco in 2015. She outsprinted Hassan in the home straight by about 2.5 s.

In the women's 1500 m final of the delayed 2020 Tokyo Olympics in August, Kipyegon overtook Hassan in the last 200 m to secure her second consecutive Olympic gold medal in the event in a time of 3:53.11, breaking the Games record which had stood for 33 years. She became the second woman in history to win back-to-back Olympic 1500 m titles, while Hassan faded in the home stretch (3:55.86 for third)

In September, she beat Hassan again at the Zürich Weltklasse Diamond League final to take her second 1500 m Diamond Trophy. Kipyegon won nine out of her ten races of the season.

=== 2022: Second senior world title ===
In May, Kipyegon opened her season over 3000 m at the Doha Diamond League, finishing second behind Francine Niyonsaba in 8:38.05. She claimed victory in her signature event at the Eugene Diamond League, with a time of 3:52.59.

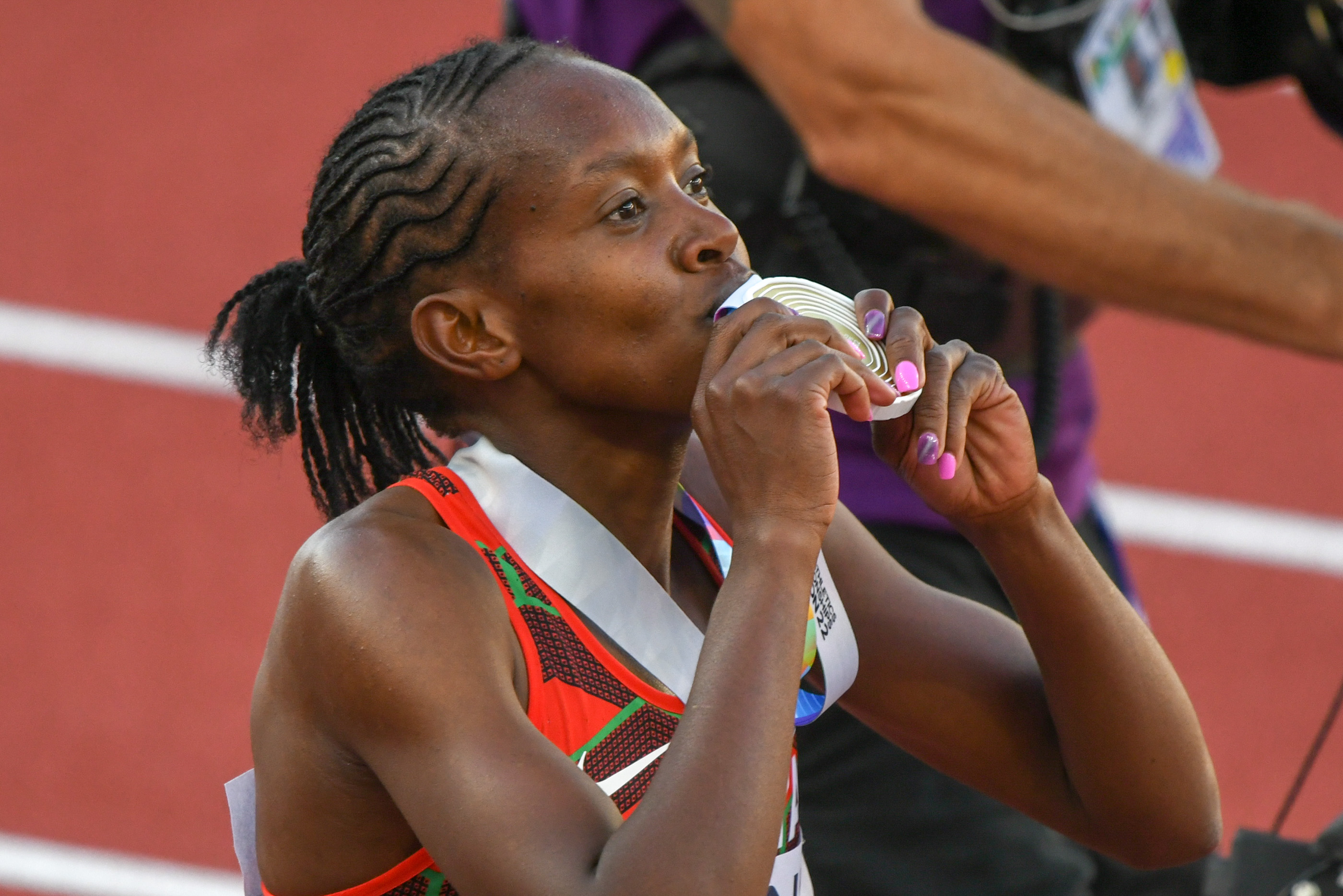
Kipyegon with her record fourth global 1500 m gold medal at the 2022 World Championships in Eugene.

At the World Championships held also in Eugene in July, Kipyegon decisively won the 1500 m gold medal with a time of 3:52.96, which made her the first female athlete to win four global titles over the distance. Gudaf Tsegay placed second in 3:54.52 while Laura Muir earned bronze (3:55.28).

On 10 August at the Monaco Diamond League, Kipyegon came within 0.3 s of Dibaba's world record with 3:50.37 to set her new Kenyan record and the second-fastest performance in history at the time. She split 60.5 / 62.1 / 62.1 / 45.67 (last 400 m in 61.3 s), and as of May 2025, held seven of the thirteen fastest women's 1500 m marks in history. She ended her successful season with a clear victory at the Zürich circuit's final the following month, this time closing strongly after a tactical race (last lap in 57.75 and last 200 m in 27.8) to earn her third Diamond League 1500 m title. Kipyegon won all her six 1500 m races of the season.

In November interview with Athletics Weekly, she said that she would like to run marathons in the future.

=== 2023: World 1500 m, mile, and 5000 m records ===
Kipyegon got her 2023 campaign off to a strong start on 4 February with a dominant victory at the Sirikwa Cross Country Classic (10 km) on home soil in Eldoret.

On 2 June, she eventually got the only thing that was missing on her resume, setting a world 1500 m record of 3:49.11 to become the first woman in history to break the 3:50-barrier in the discipline. The 29-year-old sliced almost a second from Dibaba's mark (3:50.07) while running a big negative split at the Rome Diamond League staged that year also in Florence. She hit 800 in 2:04.1, as a pacemaker was asked for (WR pace was 2:02.7), and passed the bell in 2:50.2 (Dibaba hit the bell at 2:50.3). Kipyegon was sensational over the final two laps, running her last 800 in 2:00.6, last 400 in 58.81, and last 200 in 29.2. The entire race field congratulated and embraced her after her lap of honour.

Kipyegon made it two world records in a week after breaking her own world record exactly seven days later, on 9 June, Letesenbet Gidey's 5000 metres world standard of 14:06.62 set in 2020. Faith's second world record came as a surprise as it was her first race over the distance since 2015 and her third ever. Racing in a thrilling duel with Letesenbet at the Paris Diamond League, she smashed her old PB (14:31.95) and sliced 1.42 s off that world record with a time of 14:05.20. She overtook her with 600 m to go but Letesenbet was closely following, with both lagging about six seconds behind the world record pace. Kipyegon ran a last lap in 60.6 s and dropped Letesenbet in a sprint finish in the last 200 m timed at 28.1 s, even faster than in her 1500 m world record race. She became only the second woman in history to hold both the 1500 m and 5000 m records simultaneously after Paola Pigni in 1969, and the first Kenyan woman to hold the latter. Kipyegon's 5000 metres world record has since been broken by Gudaf Tsegay, who ran 14:00.21 at the 2023 Prefontaine Classic.

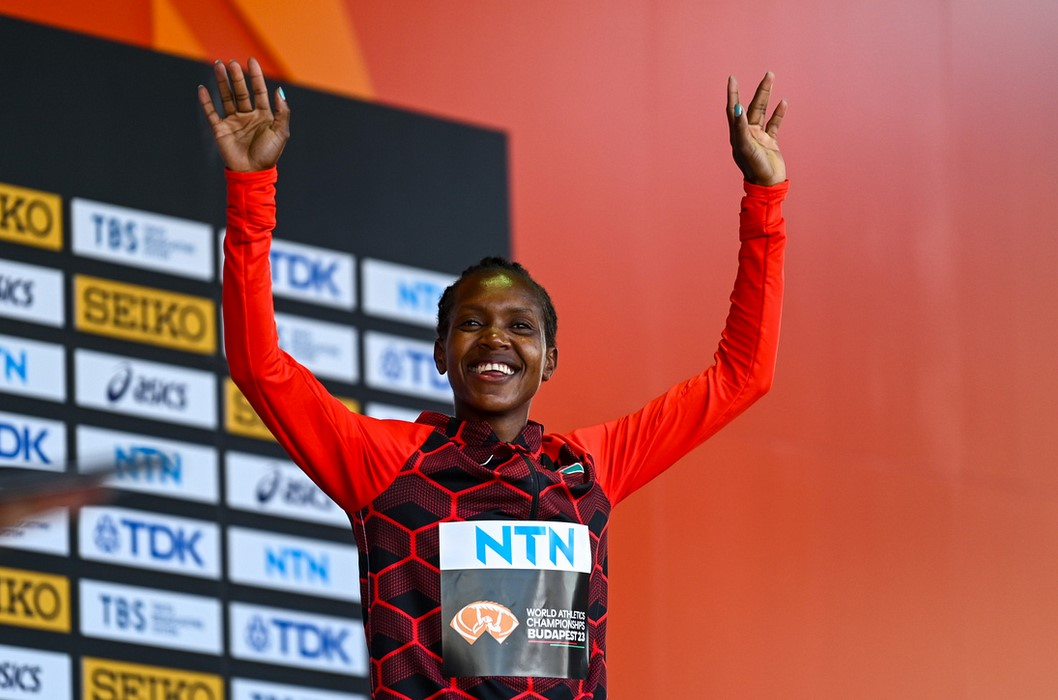
Kipyegon at the 2023 World Championships.

On 21 July 2023, at the Monaco Diamond League, Kipyegon ran 4:07.64 in the mile, breaking Sifan Hassan's mile world record of 4:12.33 which had stood since 2019.

At the 2023 World Athletics Championships in Budapest, Kipyegon achieved the 1500 and 5000 m double, winning the former in 3:54.87 and the latter in 14:53.88.

=== 2024: New 1500 m world record, back to back to back 1500 m Olympic gold, and Olympic 5000 m silver ===
In June 2024, at the 2024 Kenyan Olympic Trials in Nairobi, Kipyegon won both the 1500 and 5000 m, in times of 3:53.99 and 14:46.28, respectively.

On 7 July 2024, at the Meeting de Paris, Kipyegon broke her own 1500 m world record by seven hundredths of a second, running 3:49.04.

At the Paris 2024 Olympics, after initially winning the silver medal in the women's 5,000 metres, Kipyegon faced disqualification for obstruction of Ethiopian athlete Gudaf Tsegay. However, she was later reinstated to her silver medal position behind her compatriot, gold medalist Beatrice Chebet, following a successful appeal. Kipyegon ended her campaign at the Paris Olympics with gold in the 1500m, breaking her own Olympic record with a time of 3:51.29. She outsprinted silver and bronze medallists Jessica Hull and Georgia Bell to win by a margin of 1.27 seconds.

On 14 September 2024, Kipyegon won the 1500 metres at the 2024 Diamond League final in Brussels, Belgium, in a meeting record time of 3:54.75. On 26 September 2024, she won the first edition of Athlos, an all-woman track and field meeting at Icahn Stadium in New York City.

=== 2025: Sub four-minute mile attempt, 1500 m world record improvement ===
On 26 April, Kipyegon set a meeting record in the 1000 metres at the Xiamen Diamond League, running 2:29.21. This time was 0.06 seconds off her personal best and 0.23 seconds off Svetlana Masterkova's world record of 2:28.98.

On 26 June, in a special event organized by Nike, Kipyegon attempted to become the first woman to break four minutes for the mile. She fell 6.91 seconds short of the barrier with a time of 4:06.91. Nike later subtracted the reaction time, adjusting her official time to 4:06.42. Similar to the Ineos 1:59 Challenge and Breaking2, World Athletics will not recognize the record. This event was announced in April 2025. She was assisted by 'the next generation of super shoes' and both male and female pacers.

On 5 July, at the Prefontaine Classic, Kipyegon improved her 1500-metre world record by 0.36 seconds to 3:48.68, becoming the first woman to break the 3:49 barrier.

== Achievements ==
All information taken from World Athletics profile.

=== Personal bests ===
Personal best times
Event	Time (m:s)	Venue	Date	Notes
800 metres	1:57.68	Doha, Qatar	25 September 2020	
1000 metres	2:29.15	Fontvieille, Monaco	14 August 2020	AR, 2nd of all time
1500 metres	3:48.68	Eugene, United States	5 July 2025	WR
Mile	4:07.64	Fontvieille, Monaco	21 July 2023	WR
Mile	4:06.91	Paris, France	26 June 2025	Not legal
3000 metres	8:07.04	Chorzów, Poland	16 August 2025	AR, 2nd of all time
5000 metres	14:05.20	Paris, France	9 June 2023	WR until 17 September 2023
4 × 1500 m relay	16:33.58	Nassau, Bahamas	24 May 2014	AR

=== International competitions ===
Representing Kenya
Year	Competition	Venue	Position	Event	Result	Notes
2010	World Cross Country Championships	Bydgoszcz, Poland	4th	Junior XC 5.833 km	19:02	
2010	World Cross Country Championships	Bydgoszcz, Poland	1st	Junior team	10 pts	
2011	World Cross Country Championships	Punta Umbria, Spain	1st	Junior XC 6 km	18:53	
2011	World Cross Country Championships	Punta Umbria, Spain	2nd	Junior team	19 pts	
2011	World Youth Championships	Villeneuve-d'Ascq, France	1st	1500 m	4:09.48	CR
2012	African Cross Country Championships	Cape Town, South Africa	1st	Junior XC 6 km	19:32	
2012	World Junior Championships	Barcelona, Spain	1st	1500 m	4:04.96	CR
2012	Olympic Games	London, United Kingdom	16th (h)	1500 m	4:08.78	
2013	World Cross Country Championships	Bydgoszcz, Poland	1st	Junior XC 6 km	17:51	
2013	World Cross Country Championships	Bydgoszcz, Poland	1st	Junior team	14 pts	
2013	World Championships	Moscow, Russia	5th	1500 m	4:05.08	
2014	African Cross Country Championships	Kampala, Uganda	1st	Senior XC 8 km	25:33.02	
2014	African Cross Country Championships	Kampala, Uganda	1st	Senior team	10 pts	
2014	World Relays	Nassau, Bahamas	1st	4 × 1500 m relay	16:33.58	WR
2014	Commonwealth Games	Glasgow, United Kingdom	1st	1500 m	4:08.94	
2014	African Championships	Marrakesh, Morocco	5th	1500 m	4:13.46	
2015	World Championships	Beijing, China	2nd	1500 m	4:08.96	
2016	Olympic Games	Rio de Janeiro, Brazil	1st	1500 m	4:08.92	
2017	World Cross Country Championships	Kampala, Uganda	6th	Senior XC 9.858 km	32:49	
2017	World Cross Country Championships	Kampala, Uganda	1st	Senior team	10 pts	
2017	World Championships	London, United Kingdom	1st	1500 m	4:02.59	
2019	World Championships	Doha, Qatar	2nd	1500 m	3:54.22	NR
2021	Olympic Games	Tokyo, Japan	1st	1500 m	3:53.11	OR
2022	World Championships	Eugene, United States	1st	1500 m	3:52.96	
2023	World Championships	Budapest, Hungary	1st	1500 m	3:54.87	
2023	World Championships	Budapest, Hungary	1st	5000 m	14:53.88	
2024	Olympic Games	Paris, France	1st	1500 m	3:51.29	OR
2024	Olympic Games	Paris, France	2nd	5000 m	14:29.60	
2025	World Championships	Tokyo, Japan	1st	1500 m	3:52.15	
2025	World Championships	Tokyo, Japan	2nd	5000 m	14:55.07	

=== Circuit wins and titles ===
- Diamond League 1500 metres champion (3): 2017, 2021, 2022

1500 metres wins, other events specified in parentheses

- 2015 (1): Brussels Memorial Van Damme (One mile, WL AR)
- 2016 (3): Shanghai Diamond League (WL MR NR), Eugene Prefontaine Classic (WL MR NR), Oslo Bislett Games (One mile, WL)
- 2017 (3): Shanghai (WL), Eugene, Brussels (SB)
- 2019 (1): Prefontaine Classic in Palo Alto (SB)
- 2020 (3): Monaco Herculis (1000 m, DLR AR), Brussels (1000 m), Doha Diamond League (800 m, WL PB)
- 2021 (4): Doha (800 m), Monaco (WL NR), Eugene (MR), Zürich Weltklasse
- 2022 (3): Eugene (WL MR), Monaco (WL NR), Zürich
- 2023 (3): Doha (WL), Rome Golden Gala in Florence (WR), Paris Meeting (5000 m, WR)
- 2024 : Paris (Olympics). 1500 m, OR in Paris

- World Athletics Cross Country Tour
  - 2022–23: Sirikwa Cross Country Classic

=== National titles ===
- Kenyan Cross Country Championships
  - Senior women's race: 2014, 2015

== Awards and honours ==
- Kenyan Sports Personality of the Year – Sportswoman of the Year: 2021, 2022
- World Athletics – World Athlete of the Year: 2023 (track)
- Laureus World Sports Award for Sportswoman of the Year: 2024 Nominee
- Golden Plate Award of the American Academy of Achievement: 2024 – presented by President William Ruto

== Philanthropy ==
In January 2026, Kipyegon announced that she was starting a maternity ward in her hometown Keringet that has been termed the Dare to Dream Maternity Ward. She said, “Growing up in Keringet, I saw too many women go into labour full of hope, only to return empty-handed because the care they needed was too far away or not good enough. This maternity wing is about changing that reality – giving mothers safety, dignity, and hope.” The maternity ward, supported by Nike, will be operated in partnership with the Franciscan Sisters of the Immaculate Conception to ensure professional care and compassion for expectant mothers.

== See also ==
- List of Olympic medalists in athletics (women)
- List of 2016 Summer Olympics medal winners
- List of African Olympic medalists
- List of World Athletics Championships medalists (women)
- List of Commonwealth Games medallists in athletics (women)
- 1500 metres at the Olympics
- 1500 metres at the World Championships in Athletics

Records
Preceded by Genzebe Dibaba	Women's 1500 m world record holder 2 June 2023 – present	Incumbent
Preceded by Letesenbet Gidey	Women's 5000 m world record holder 9 June 2023 – 17 September 2023	Succeeded by Gudaf Tsegay
Preceded by Sifan Hassan	Women's one mile world record holder 21 July 2023 – present	Incumbent
