= African Cross Country Championships =

International running competition

- Sport: Cross country running
- Founded: 1985; 41 years ago 2011; 15 years ago
- Continent: Africa (CAA)

The African Cross Country Championships is a regional cross country running competition for athletes from Africa.

== History ==
The competition had a one off edition in 1985 in Nairobi, Kenya, and the medallists were mostly from the host nation. Following an announcement by the International Association of Athletics Federations (IAAF) that the IAAF World Cross Country Championships would change to a biennial format, the Confederation of African Athletics stated that the 2011 African Cross Country Championships would be held in Cape Town, South Africa, marking a relaunch of the competition.

While all other continental regions defined by the IAAF have had their own regional cross country championships on an annual or biennial basis, Africa did not have a regular competition in this mould for a long period. This may have been due to a number of factors including: the high status of annual cross country meetings such as the Kenya National Cross Country Championships and the Jan Meda International Cross Country (which doubles as the Ethiopian championships), the size of the region, the prominence of smaller regional championships, and the comparative lack of resources available to the Confederation of African Athletics.

The fact that the majority of the sport's top competitors come from Africa means that the top runners at the World Cross Country Championships, especially in the men's section, are largely the same ones which would form the field of an African Championships – at the 2009 IAAF World Cross Country Championships the top 25 finishers in the men's race, and the top 12 in the women's race, were all African-born. Commenting on the dominance of the competition, IAAF president Lamine Diack said that the competition had "become not only an African affair but an East African affair, and these days you don't even get athletes from West Africa competing".

A number of smaller regional championships have been held in Africa: the East African Cross Country Championships and the Maghreb Cross Country Championships in North Africa are both well-established competitions. West and Central African competitions have also been held in past years.

The 6th championships were originally scheduled for 2020 in Togo, the competition was delayed by four years due to the COVID-19 pandemic in Africa and the venue was moved.

== Editions ==
Edition	Year	Venue	City	Country	No. of athletes
—	1985		Nairobi	Kenya	
1st	2011	Koerboom Park	Cape Town	South Africa	
2nd	2012	Koerboom Park	Cape Town	South Africa	160
3rd	2014	Kololo	Kampala	Uganda	
4th	2016		Yaoundé	Cameroon	
5th	2018		Chlef	Algeria	
6th	2024	Yasmine Hammamet	Hammamet	Tunisia	116

== Medals (1985-2024) ==
Consist of all individual and team events in senior, U23 and U20.

Rank	Nation	Gold	Silver	Bronze	Total
1	Kenya (KEN)	50	23	18	91
2	Ethiopia (ETH)	6	17	10	33
3	Uganda (UGA)	0	7	8	15
4	Eritrea (ERI)	0	4	5	9
5	Morocco (MAR)	0	3	8	11
6	South Africa (RSA)	0	1	5	6
7	Tanzania (TAN)	0	1	2	3
Totals (7 entries)		56	56	56	168

== Champions ==
Year	Men's senior race	Women's senior race	Men's team	Women's team	Mixed relay
1985	Paul Kipkoech (KEN)	Hellen Kimaiyo (KEN)	Kenya	Kenya	—N/a
2011	John Nzau Mwangangi (KEN)	Mercy Cherono (KEN)	Kenya	Kenya	—N/a
2012	Clement Langat (KEN)	Joyce Chepkirui (KEN)	Kenya	Kenya	—N/a
2014	Leonard Barsoton (KEN)	Faith Kipyegon (KEN)	Kenya	Kenya	—N/a
2016	James Gitahi Rungaru (KEN)	Alice Aprot Nawowuna (KEN)	Kenya	Kenya	—N/a
2018	Alfred Barkach (KEN)	Celliphine Chespol (KEN)	Kenya	Kenya	Ethiopia
2024	Vincent Kibet Langat (KEN)	Cintia Chepngeno (KEN)	Kenya	Kenya	Kenya
