= Ineos 1:59 Challenge =

2019 attempt to beat a 2-hour marathon

Logo of the event

The Ineos 1:59 Challenge, held on 12 October 2019, was an attempt by Kenyan athlete Eliud Kipchoge to break the two-hour mark for running the marathon distance, which he achieved in a time of 1:59:40.2. The event was specifically created for Kipchoge and held in Vienna, Austria to help market the Nike ZoomX Vaporfly 4%. Kipchoge had previously attempted to run a two hour marathon at the Breaking2 event organised by Nike in 2017, but he fell short by 25 seconds. He then went on to run a world record marathon at the 2018 Berlin Marathon before British chemicals company Ineos announced the attempt in May 2019. 41 pacemakers, rotating in and out in groups of 7, assisted Kipchoge throughout the attempt.

Due to the presence of the pacemakers, delivery of hydration by bicycle, and the lack of open competition, the achievement was not eligible to be ratified as a marathon world record, and was not recognized as such by World Athletics. The two-hour barrier was first broken under record-eligible conditions by Sabastian Sawe in the 2026 London Marathon, with a time of 1:59:30.

== Background ==
The possibility of a sub-two-hour marathon had attracted increasing discussion since about 2011, at which time the world record was 2:03:59 held by Ethiopian runner Haile Gebrselassie. Gebrselassie said in 2011 that the two-hour mark could be broken in 20 to 25 years. Athletics manager Glenn Latimer believed that the record would plateau around the 2:02 mark, an opinion shared by Kenyan runner Samuel Wanjiru. Extrapolating the fall in marathon world record times, Francois Peronnet of the University of Montreal predicted that the two-hour mark would be broken in 2028. In 2017, The Economist reported that the average decrease in the marathon record was 8 seconds per year for the previous 50 years and 9.4 seconds per year for the previous 20 years. If the record continued to reduce at either of these rates, then the – barrier would be crossed in 2040 or 2036, respectively. It also stated that the range of peak ability was between 1:57:58 and 2:00:47. A 2019 study by Simon Angus of Monash University predicted that the barrier would be crossed in May 2032 with an odds of success level of 1 in 10 and that the peak ability is 1:58:05.

=== Breaking2 ===
Breaking2 was a project run by sports equipment manufacturer Nike announced in December 2016 with the goal of breaking the two-hour mark over the marathon. Three runners, Zersenay Tadese, Lelisa Desisa, and Eliud Kipchoge were to attempt the feat, assisted by a team of pacemakers, scientists, engineers, physicians and trainers. The world record at the time was held by Dennis Kimeto, set at the 2014 Berlin Marathon where he ran 2:02:57, while Kipchoge, whom Ed Caesar of Wired described as "the best marathoner in the world" had a personal best of 2:03:05. Tadese and Desisa had marathon personal bests of 2:10:41 and 2:04:45, respectively, while Tadese had the fastest half-marathon best of the three at 58:23. The reason for Tadese's selection was his perceived potential based on assessments made by the support team.

Nike announced the race would take place at the Monza Circuit near Monza, Italy, where Kipchoge ran a half marathon personal best of 59:17 during a test event. The course was 2.4 kilometres (1.5 mi) long which meant the run would consist of about 17.5 laps around the course.

The attempt took place on 6 May 2017 at 5:45 a.m. Central European Time (UTC+1). Groups of six pacemakers ran in a diamond formation around the three runners and aimed to go through every 5 kilometres (3.1 mi) in 14:13. For the first 5-kilometre section split, they were one second off the pace, going through in 14:14, and they later went through the 10 kilometres (6.2 mi) mark in 28:21. Around 50 minutes into the race, Desisa dropped out of the group before Tadese and Kipchoge went together through halfway in 59:57. Tadese soon dropped off the pace leaving Kipchoge alone to pass through 30 kilometres (19 mi) in 1:25:20 and 40 kilometres (25 mi) in 1:54:00. Falling behind the target pace, Kipchoge would need to increase his pace in order to run under 2 hours. However, he lost 10 seconds on the final lap, leaving him short of the goal by 25 seconds in a time of 2:00:25. Tadese finished in 2:06:51 and Desisa in 2:14:10.

Although faster than Kimetto's record of 2:02:57, Kipchoge's time could not be ratified by the IAAF (now known as World Athletics) as the attempt included the use of interchangeable pacemakers. Caesar believed that factors contributing to the failure of the attempt were the temperature and humidity on the day, which were both higher than the ideal range. A 2012 study found that the ideal temperature was 4 °C (39 °F) and that a 10 °C increase resulted in a 1.4% decrease in speed, while the temperature during the attempt was 11 °C (52 °F).

=== Events after Breaking2 ===
Later in 2017, Kipchoge competed in the Berlin Marathon alongside Kenenisa Bekele (the defending champion), Wilson Kipsang, Vincent Kipruto, Guye Adola, Mosinet Geremew, and Felix Kandie. Kipchoge won in a time of 2:03:32, his second fastest time after his 2:03:05 performance at the 2016 London Marathon. The victory marked his eighth win out of the previous nine marathons he had competed in, excluding Breaking2. Kipchoge followed this success with a victory in the 2018 London Marathon. Pacemakers were instructed to and passed through the halfway mark in 1:01:00, faster than the world record pace following splits of 13:48 and 28:19 through 5 kilometres and 10 kilometres, respectively. In the 24th mile, Kipchoge left Ethiopian Shura Kitata to win in a time of 2:04:17. Kipchoge next raced in the 2018 Berlin Marathon held on 16 September 2018. He stated that his preparation was "entirely concentrated" on the race and was "confident" that he could beat his personal best. Also racing were the likes of Tadese and Kipsang. Kipchoge completed the first 10 kilometres in 29:01 and the second in 28:55 before passing through the halfway mark in 61:06 before the last pacemaker soon dropped out. He then ran solo for the rest of the race, running a negative split and a 60:34 second half. He crossed the line in a world record time of 2:01:39, 78 seconds faster than Kimeto's previous world record. He next raced in the 2019 London Marathon in April 2019. A group of nine went through 10 kilometres (6.2 mi) in 29:01 and halfway in 61:37 before Kipchoge increased the pace and "one by one" his competitors dropped out of the group. Through the 24th mile, only Geremew managed to stay with him. Kipchoge ran the next two miles in 4:26 and 4:30 to win the race 2:02:37, while Geremew finished second in 2:02:55. This was Kipchoge's second fastest time behind his Berlin world record and also the second fastest marathon in history as well as his fourth London Marathon victory.

On 26 April 2026, Sabastian Sawe and Yomif Kejelcha became the first individuals to run a record-eligible marathon in under two hours, at the 2026 London Marathon.

== Summary ==
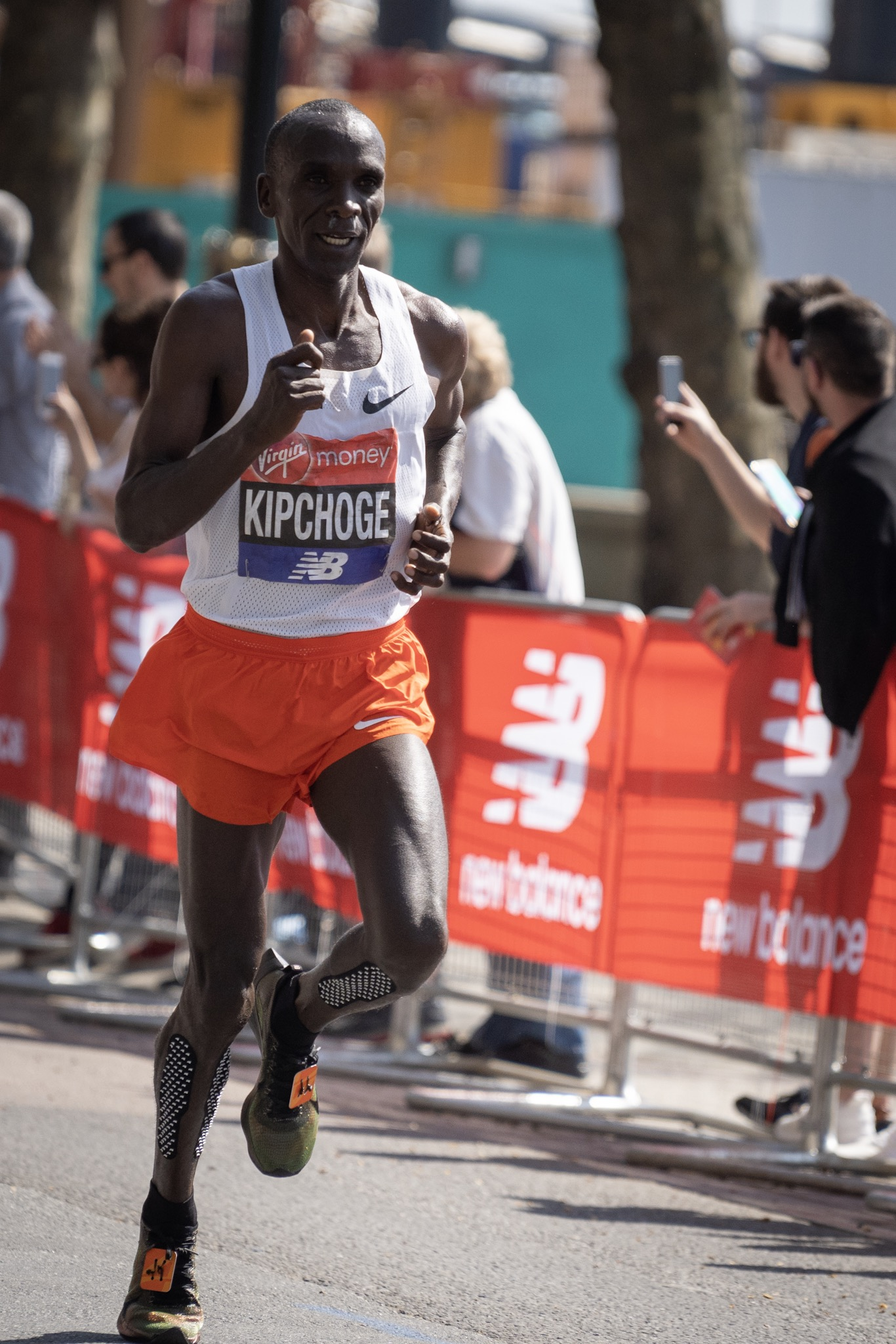
Kipchoge at the 2018 London Marathon

On 6 May 2019, in a press release on their website, British multinational chemicals company Ineos announced that Kipchoge would be attempting a marathon in the autumn of 2019. Ineos has invested in sports ventures such as cycling team Ineos Grenadiers (bought from Sky in 2019, a team which had won 8 Grand Tours since 2012), and Formula One through the part ownership and principal sponsorship of Mercedes-Benz. The attempt was scheduled to take place on the 6 May 2019, the 65th anniversary of the "historic" four-minute mile by British runner Roger Bannister.

=== Course ===
The attempt was to take place in the Prater, a park in Vienna, Austria. The city was chosen to host the run after an "extensive search of venues fitting Eliud's criteria" with factors such as time zone, weather, and number of spectators considered. A preprint published in October 2019 claimed that the oxygen uptake on the Vienna course would "fluctuate by no more than 2% of the oxygen uptake rates on a flat, straight course" and that it would "incur a penalty of less than 5 seconds compared to a perfectly level and straight course".

=== The attempt ===
Comparison of Kipchoge's speeds in Breaking2, the 2018 Berlin Marathon world record, and the Ineos 1:59 Challenge (Vienna).

For the attempt Kipchoge was joined by forty-one pacemakers, who rotated twice each lap and ran in a V-formation, rather than the diamond formation chosen for the previous attempt. Kipchoge was placed at the bottom of the formation with two pacemakers running behind him. Each lap of the course featured two 4.3-kilometre (2.7-mile) out-and-back stretches of Hauptallee with the turning points coming at the Lusthaus and Praterstern roundabouts at either end of the avenue, in the Prater park. The entire route inclines only 2.4 metres (7.9 feet). Spectators were present for the attempt.

The organizers planned to run the event on Saturday, 12 October 2019, but they had a reserve window of eight days in case of poor weather conditions. The attempt was run on 12 October starting at 08:15 CET. Organizers allowed a start time between 05:00 and 09:00, but chose 08:15 to maximize viewership. The weather conditions were expected to be dry with a temperature of 9 °C (48 °F) at the start, rising to 12 °C (54 °F) at the finish.

Ineos 1:59 Challenge
5 km splits	Split	Time
5 km	14:10	0:14:10
10 km	14:10	0:28:20
15 km	14:14	0:42:34
20 km	14:13	0:56:47
25 km	14:12	1:10:59
30 km	14:12	1:25:11
35 km	14:12	1:39:23
40 km	14:13	1:53:36
42.195 km	6:04	1:59:40
Average 5 km	14:10.8	

Kipchoge completed the challenge with an official time of 1:59:40.2, an average speed of 5.88 metres per second (21.2 km/h; 13.2 mph). Directly after finishing the run, Kipchoge stated: "I am feeling good. After Roger Bannister in 1954 it took another 63 years, I tried and I did not get it - 65 years, I am the first man - I want to inspire many people, that no human is limited."

== Accessories and optimization strategies ==
The organizers of the attempt added many techniques during the run which cumulatively assisted Kipchoge and the pacemakers:

- Pacing lasers guided the pacemakers and the main runner, thus allowing them to run at a precise pace and meaning energy was not lost in unwanted acceleration.
- The route was carefully chosen to ensure that no effort would be wasted on battling the wind or on directional or incline changes. This was achieved by the fact that most of the course was lined with tall trees reducing wind, and the course was very flat.
- The location of the race was chosen because its time zone was close to that of Kaptagat, Kenya, where Kipchoge trains. This meant Kipchoge would not be affected by jet lag or have his sleeping and eating patterns disrupted.
- The route was picked to be at low altitude, to increase oxygen in the air and thus help performance.
- Kipchoge wore an improved version of Nike's previously unreleased Vaporfly Next% running shoes, claimed to improve running economy by 4 percent. The shoes were not banned by the IAAF, and the top 10 men in the Chicago Marathon (held the next day) wore Vaporflys. It was reported that Kipchoge and Brigid Kosgei, who broke the women's world record in Chicago, wore bespoke versions of the shoe, with the model called AlphaFLY. The Nike Vaporfly that they wore has a carbon-fibre plate fitted in its chunky foam sole which supposedly helps propel the wearer forward. A group of athletes complained to the IAAF about the shoes, leading the governing body to create a working party to look at the issue. However, Kipchoge had set his world record wearing them a year earlier, as did Abraham Kiptum when he set the half-marathon record. In addition, the five fastest times over the distance were all set by runners wearing these shoes.
- A V-shaped formation of pacemakers shielded the runner from wind resistance. An earlier attempt used a differently shaped diamond formation. Kipchoge was placed at the bottom of the formation with two pacemakers running behind him.
- Hydration was provided by a team coordinator on a bicycle, and not via the usual water station method, in order to save time.

The Breaking2 attempt had been held behind closed doors at Monza with just a few press and Nike employees present. Kipchoge missed the presence of a crowd there and requested that the public be allowed to attend the Ineos 1:59 Challenge.

== Pacemakers ==
A team of forty-one runners served as Kipchoge's pacemakers in the challenge.

Name	Notes	Ref(s)
Joel Ayeko	Two-time World Mountain Running Championship silver medalist.	
Thomas Ayeko	Junior silver medalist at the 2011 IAAF World Cross Country Championships	
Selemon Barega	2018 Diamond League champion over 5000 m	
Emmanuel Bett	Fastest time over 10,000 metres in the 2012 season	
Hillary Bor	Gold medalist, 3000 metres steeplechase at the 2019 USA Outdoor Track and Field Championships	
Matthew Centrowitz	2016 Olympic and World Indoor Champion over 1500 m	
Paul Chelimo	Olympic and World medalist over 5000 m	
Augustine Choge	2006 Commonwealth Games Champion over 5000 m. Part of Eliud Kipchoge’s training group	
Victor Chumo	Part of Eliud Kipchoge’s training group	
Filip Ingebrigtsen	Reigning European Cross-Country champion and 2016 European 1500m Champion	
Henrik Ingebrigtsen	2012 European 1500m Champion	
Jakob Ingebrigtsen	2021 Olympic Champion over 1500m. 2022 and 2023 World Outdoor Champion over 5000m. Youngest pacemaker.	
Philemon Kacheran	Part of Eliud Kipchoge’s training group	
Stanley Kebenei		
Justus Kimutai		
Shadrack Kipchirchir	Silver medalist at the 2014 NCAA Outdoor Championships in the 10,000 metres	
Noah Kipkemboi		
Gideon Kipketer	Part of Eliud Kipchoge’s training group	
Jacob Kiplimo	Silver medalist, IAAF World Cross Country Championships	
Marius Kipserem		
Eric Kiptanui		
Moses Koech		
Shadrack Koech		
Micah Kogo	Former World Record holder for 10k road run.	
Alex Korio		
Jonathan Korir		
Ronald Kwemoi	Gold medalist, 2014 Kenyan National Championship in the 1500 metres	
Bernard Lagat	Oldest pacemaker. Was part of the Breaking2 challenge. Beat Kipchoge to the 5000 m World title in 2007.	
Lopez Lomong	Part of the Breaking2 attempt in 2017.	
Abdallah Mande		
Stewart McSweyn		
Kota Murayama		
Ronald Musagala		
Kaan Kigen Özbilen		
Jack Rayner		
Chala Regasa		
Brett Robinson		
Nicholas Rotich	Part of Eliud Kipchoge’s training group	
Patrick Tiernan		
Timothy Toroitich		
Julien Wanders	Former World Record holder for 5k road run. Current European record holder for the half marathon and the European record holder for the 10K run.	

== See also ==
- Breaking2
- Breaking4
- 2026 London Marathon
