= Kipchoge: The Last Milestone =

- Promotional poster
- Directed by: Jake Scott
- Produced by: Ross Plummer
- Starring: Eliud Kipchoge
- Cinematography: Thomas Dirnhofer
- Edited by: Struan Clay; Paul Trewartha
- Music by: Simon Elms; Colin Smith
- Production company: Ridley Scott Creative Group
- Distributed by: Universal Pictures
- Release date: 24 August 2021
- Running time: 86
- Country: United Kingdom
- Language: English

Kipchoge: The Last Milestone is a 2021 British documentary film directed by Jake Scott and executive produced by Ridley Scott. It follows Kenyan athlete Eliud Kipchoge and the events leading up to the Ineos 1:59 Challenge that saw him breaking the two-hour mark for running the marathon distance. The film was released digitally on-demand on 24 August 2021.

== Production ==
The film was directed by Jake Scott, produced by Ross Plummer and executive produced by Kai-Lu Hsiung, Kevin Macdonald, and Ridley Scott.

== Critical reception ==
Outside reviewer Martin Fritz Huber wrote that he "learnt nothing new" from the film, but praised its "irresistible" cinematography. Rob Aldam of Backseat Mafia described the film as a "fascinating journey following a man fully-focussed on one goal and the huge support team dedicated to making it all possible".
