= Breaking2 =

Project by Nike

Participants
Eliud Kipchoge	Zersenay Tadese	Lelisa Desisa

Breaking2 was a project by Nike to break the two-hour barrier for the marathon. Nike announced the project in November 2016 and organized a team of three elite runners who trained for a private race. The event was held on the Formula One race track Autodromo Nazionale di Monza in Italy on May 6, 2017.

Eliud Kipchoge won the race with a time of 2:00:25. While the world record at the time was 2:02:57, this run was not recognized as a new record, because Kipchoge and the other two elite athletes ran with a roster of interchangeable pacemakers.

== Team members ==
Nike chose three runners to make the attempt:

Name	Nationality	Birth date	Age	Previous best marathon
Lelisa Desisa	Ethiopia	14 January 1990	27	2:04:45
Eliud Kipchoge	Kenya	5 November 1984	32	2:03:05
Zersenay Tadese	Eritrea	8 February 1982	35	2:10:41

At the time, Kipchoge was the defending Olympic champion, having won the marathon at the 2016 Summer Olympics in Rio de Janeiro, and Zersenay was the half marathon WR holder (58:23, set in 2010).

Nike also brought in 30 of their top sponsored athletes to serve as pacers for the race, including Andrew Bumbalough, Sam Chelanga, Chris Derrick, Bernard Lagat, and Lopez Lomong.

== Preparations ==
Nike developed a new running shoe called the "Vaporfly Elite" for the attempt. The Monza automobile racetrack was chosen for a combination of its low altitude, calm weather conditions, and short lap length. In addition to the pacemaker vehicle, runners acting as pacemakers were positioned to shield the key athletes in an attempt to reduce wind resistance.

== Race ==
The race began at 5:45 am on Saturday, May 6, 2017, with a temperature of 12°C or 54°F (a higher than ideal temperature for professional marathoners, generally) and some light rain.

To break the two-hour barrier, a pace of 2:50 min/km (4:34.5 per mile) was required. In order to achieve this, the racers followed behind a team of six pacers in a triangle formation who were themselves following a pace vehicle displaying a large clock of the race time and projecting green lasers onto the ground to indicate where the lead pacer should be at all times. The pacers only ran two laps (4.8 km) at a time and had 30 minute breaks in between shifts. Groups of pacers would cycle on and off in threes. These innovations disqualified the performances from being recognised as official marathon records by the IAAF.

The runners started off on pace, but Desisa fell off the pace about 16km in, and Tadese followed around 20km. Kipchoge remained on pace through 25km (at 1:11:03) and was only one second off pace at 30km. Kipchoge finished the race in 2:00:25 and said he had given 100 percent effort.

== Results ==
Position	Athlete	Nationality	Time
1st place, gold medalist(s)	Eliud Kipchoge	Kenya	2:00:25
2nd place, silver medalist(s)	Zersenay Tadese	Eritrea	2:06:51
3rd place, bronze medalist(s)	Lelisa Desisa	Ethiopia	2:14:10

At the time of the race, the world record of the marathon was 2:02:57 (set by Dennis Kimetto at the 2014 Berlin Marathon). Even though Kipchoge beat this time by more than two minutes, his result does not count as an official record by IAAF standards because of several factors, including the use of pacers who entered the race midway.

== Aftermath ==
A 55-minute documentary about the event also called Breaking2 was produced in partnership with National Geographic and released in 2017.

In 2019, Kipchoge participated in the Ineos 1:59 Challenge, another attempt to break the two-hour mark. This attempt succeeded, with Kipchoge finishing in 1:59:40.2. This time did not qualify as a world record because, as with Breaking2, the conditions did not conform to the IAAF's requirements.

On 26 April 2026, Sabastian Sawe won the 2026 London Marathon in a time of 1:59:30. This was the first eligible marathon completed in under two hours. The runner-up, Yomif Kejelcha, also finished the race in under two hours, with a time of 1:59:41, recording the fastest non-winning marathon time and the fastest marathon debut in history. Both times were certified as the conditions did conform to World Athletics' requirements, unlike the previous attempts. Significantly, both Sawe and Kejelchall ran in Adidas, not Nike, shoes.

== See also ==
- Breaking4 – a 2025 attempt at the four minute mile by a woman runner
