= Breaking 2 =

Breaking 2 may refer to:

- Breaking2, project by Nike to break the two-hour barrier in the marathon
- Breakin' 2: Electric Boogaloo, 1984 breakdancing film
