= Sabastian Sawe =

Kenyan long-distance runner (born 1995)

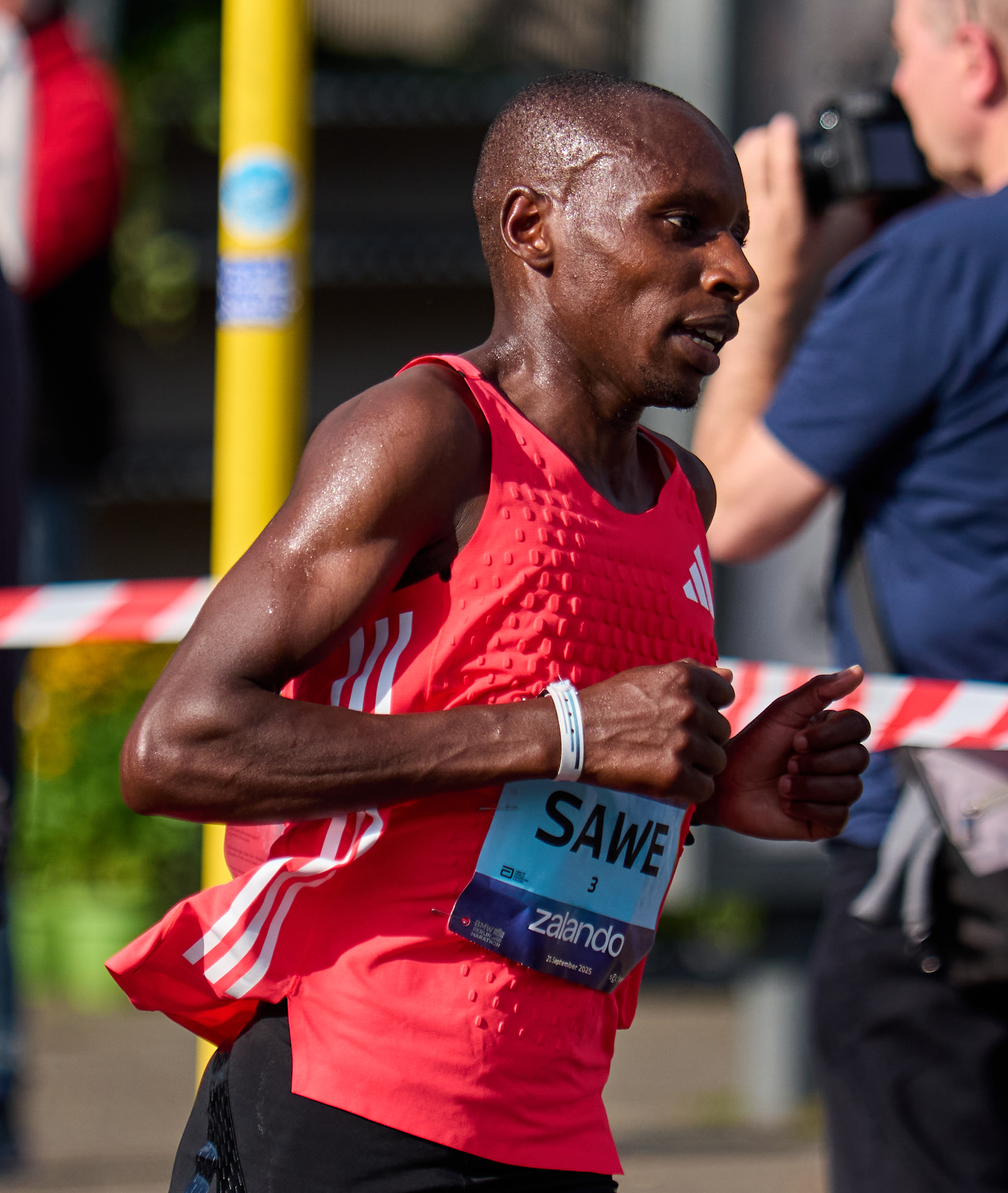
- Sawe running the 2025 Berlin Marathon

Personal information
- Full name: Sabastian Kimaru Sawe
- Born: 16 March 1995 (age 31) Barsombe, Kenya

Sport
- Sport: Athletics
- Event: Long-distance running
- Team: Adidas
Medal record
Men's athletics
Representing Kenya
World Road Running Championships
| Gold medal – first place | 2023 Riga | Half-marathon |
World Cross Country Championships
| Gold medal – first place | 2023 Bathurst | Senior team |
World Marathon Majors
| Gold medal – first place | 2025 Berlin | Marathon |
| Gold medal – first place | 2025 London | Marathon |
| Gold medal – first place | 2026 London | Marathon |

Sabastian Kimaru Sawe (born 16 March 1995) is a Kenyan long-distance runner who holds the world record in the marathon. He is a three-time winner of World Marathon Majors, having won the 2025 London Marathon, 2025 Berlin Marathon, and 2026 London Marathon. At the latter, he became the first person to complete a sub-two-hour marathon in a record-eligible race, setting a world record of 1:59:30. Sawe made his marathon debut at the 2024 Valencia Marathon, winning in 2:02:05.

== Early life and background ==
Sawe was born in the village of Barsombe in the Rift Valley Province of Kenya (today in Uasin Gishu County) to a father who worked as a maize farmer. He was primarily raised by his grandmother. Sawe grew up in a house "with mud walls and no electricity." He attended St Patrick's High School in Iten. He is married and has a son. He was raised as a Catholic and continues to practice the religion.

== Career ==
Sawe's uncle Abraham Chepkirwok was the national record holder in Uganda over 800m. Sawe himself initially ran middle-distances, only attempting the 5000 metres for the first time in 2019 under serendipitous circumstances: having arrived late to an athletics meet, it was the only race still available. He won it in 13:56. Through his uncle's contacts, he began training with Abel Mutai, a former peer of Chepkirwok and an assistant coach at the 2Running Club, based in Nandi County and founded by Claudio Berardelli. In March 2020, however, he ruptured a tendon, limiting his racing, and later missed his international debut — pacing teammate Amos Kipruto at the 2020 Valencia Marathon — after testing positive for COVID-19.

=== Breakthrough ===
In January 2022, Sawe finished his first half marathon in Seville in 59:02, despite initially starting the race as a pacemaker. He won the run and improved on the previous course record of 1:00:44. His time was the sixth fastest half marathon time ever. In March 2022, Sawe set a course record at the Rome-Ostia Half Marathon in a time of 58:02 (a non-record eligible course). He set a then half marathon best of 58:58 from his win at the 2022 Bahrain Royal Night Half Marathon.

In September 2022, Sawe set a Kenyan national record in the one hour run at the Memorial Van Damme with a distance of 21,250 metres, narrowly missing the world record. Sawe finished seventh in the senior men's race at the 2023 World Cross Country Championships. In December 2023, he won the 15 kilometres road race Montferland Run held in 's-Heerenberg in the Netherlands with a time of 42:35. In September 2024, Sawe won the Copenhagen Half Marathon in a new personal best of 58:05.

=== 2024 Valencia Marathon debut ===
On 1 December 2024, he won the Valencia Marathon in a world-leading time of 2:02:05. Sawe's mark was the 5th-fastest marathon ever run at the time, although still slower than the course record of 2:01:48 set by Sisay Lemma in the previous year. Sawe's time was the second-fastest marathon debut in history, 12 seconds slower than Kelvin Kiptum. His mark stood as the fastest marathon time run in 2024.

On 27 April 2025, Sawe won the London Marathon in a world-leading time of 2:02:27. This was followed in September 2025 with a win at the Berlin Marathon, where he lowered the world-leading time of the year to 2:02:16. Sawe was following a group of 7 pacemakers, with the last one dropping out at the 23k mark. In response to doping violations from other Kenyan athletes, Sawe had undergone an unprecedented 25 out-of-competition drug tests from the AIU to combat suspicions of doping in his buildup to Berlin.

=== London Marathon world record ===
2026 London Marathon split times
| Distance | Split | Time |
|---|---|---|
| 5k | 14:14 | 14:14 |
| 10k | 14:21 | 28:35 |
| 15k | 14:35 | 43:10 |
| 20k | 14:11 | 57:21 |
| Half Marathon | --- | 1:00:29 |
| 25k | 14:20 | 1:11:41 |
| 30k | 14:22 | 1:26:03 |
| 35k | 13:54 | 1:39:57 |
| 40k | 13:42 | 1:53:39 |
| Marathon | (5:51) | 1:59:30 |

On 26 April 2026, Sawe became the first person to complete a competitive marathon in under two hours when he won the London Marathon in a world-record time of 1:59:30. A previous sub-two-hour run by Eliud Kipchoge in the Ineos 1:59 Challenge in 2019 was not recognised as a valid record as it was not achieved under race conditions. Sawe's run was ten seconds faster than Kipchoge's and 65 seconds faster than the previous official record held by Kelvin Kiptum. Sawe's former personal best was set in his debut marathon in Valencia in 2024 with a time of 2:02:05. In his first marathon, Yomif Kejelcha of Ethopia finished second behind Sawe in a time of 1:59:41.

The women's former world record holder Paula Radcliffe stated: "We've witnessed history being made, but it is more than that. It is an iconic barrier that there has been this discussion over for a long time about whether it is even possible." Kipchoge stated: "My deepest congratulations to both Sabastian Sawe and Yomif Kejelcha. Breaking the sub-two-hour barrier in the marathon has long been a dream for runners everywhere, and today you've made that dream come true."

The race saw 800,000 spectators. The last time a men's world record was set in London was in 2002. Kelvin Kiptum had formerly set the course record with 2:01:25. Sawe ran an average of 200 km a week in the 6 weeks leading up to the run. Sawe's race shoes were a lightweight model of super shoe, the Pro Evo 3 from Adidas. The prize money for Sawe's win was £740,000.

== Achievements ==
=== International competitions ===
Representing Kenya
| Year | Competition | Venue | Position | Event | Time |
|---|---|---|---|---|---|
| 2018 | Kampala UAF Trials | Kampala, Uganda | 1st | 1500 m | 3:51.01 |
| 2019 | AK Meeting Mumias | Mumias, Kenya | 5th | 5000 m | 13:56.2 |
| 2019 | African Games Trials | Nairobi, Kenya | 6th | 5000 m | 13:46.6 |
| 2019 | African Games Trials | Nairobi, Kenya | 7th | 5000 m | 13:42.28 |
| 2020 | Eldoret Weekend Meet | Eldroret, Kenya | 6th | 5000 m | 14:30.2 |
| 2022 | GoldGala Fernanda Ribeiro | Maia, Portugal | 1st | 10,000 m | 27:09.46 |
| 2022 | Memorial Van Damme | Brussels, Belgium | 1st | One Hour | 21,250 m |
| 2023 | World Cross Country Championships | Bathurst, Australia | 7th | Senior Race | 30:04 |
| 2023 | World Cross Country Championships | Bathurst, Australia | 1st | Team | 22 pts |
| 2024 | Kenyan Cross Country Championships | Ruiru, Kenya | 1st | 10 km XC | 28:39 |
| 2024 | World Cross Country Championships | Belgrade, Serbia | 7th | Senior race | 28:31 |
| 2024 | World Cross Country Championships | Belgrade, Serbia | 1st | Team | 19 pts |
Road races
| 2022 | EDP Medio Maratón de Sevilla | Sevilla, Spain | 1st | Half Marathon | 59:02 |
| 2022 | Roma–Ostia Half Marathon | Rome, Italy | 1st | Half Marathon | 58:02 # |
| 2022 | Adizero: Road to Records | Herzogenaurach, Germany | 2nd | 10 km | 26:54 |
| 2022 | Valencia Half Marathon | Valencia, Spain | 6th | Half Marathon | 59:23 |
| 2022 | Bahrain Royal Night Half Marathon | Manama, Bahrain | 1st | Half Marathon | 58:58 |
| 2023 | Berlin Half Marathon | Berlin, Germany | 1st | Half Marathon | 59:00 |
| 2023 | Adizero: Road to Records | Herzogenaurach, Germany | 1st | 10 km | 26:49 |
| 2023 | World 10K Bangalore | Bangalore, India | 1st | 10 km | 27:59 |
| 2023 | World Athletics Road Running Championships | Riga, Latvia | 1st | Half Marathon | 59:10 |
| 2023 | Valencia Half Marathon | Valencia, Spain | 5th | Half Marathon | 58:29 |
| 2023 | Montferland Run | 's-Heerenberg, Netherlands | 1st | 15 km | 42:35 |
| 2023 | BOclassic | Bolzano, Italy | 1st | 10 km | 28:00 |
| 2024 | Prague Half Marathon | Prague, Czech Republic | 1st | Half Marathon | 58:24 |
| 2024 | Adizero: Road to Records | Herzogenaurach, Germany | 2nd | 10 km | 27:06 |
| 2024 | B.A.A. 10K | Boston, United States | 1st | 10 km | 27:42 |
| 2024 | Peachtree Road Race | Atlanta, United States | 1st | 10 km | 28:03 |
| 2024 | Copenhagen Half Marathon | Copenhagen, Denmark | 1st | Half Marathon | 58:05 |
| 2024 | Valencia Marathon | Valencia, Spain | 1st | Marathon | 2:02:05 |
World Marathon Majors
| 2025 | London Marathon | London, United Kingdom | 1st | Marathon | 2:02:27 |
| 2025 | Berlin Marathon | Berlin, Germany | 1st | Marathon | 2:02:16 |
| 2026 | London Marathon | London, United Kingdom | 1st | Marathon | 1:59:30 |

Personal bests

- 10,000 metres – 27:09.46 (Maia 2022)
- 15,000 metres – 41:51.64 (Brussels 2022) WB
- 20,000 metres – 56:20.55 (Brussels 2022) AB
- One hour run – 21,250 metres (Brussels 2022) NR
- 10K run – 26:49 (Herzogenaurach 2023), 5th fastest athlete of all time
- 15K run – 42:35 ('s-Heerenberg 2023)
- Half marathon – 58:02 (Rome 2022) (not legal)
- Half marathon – 58:05 (Copenhagen 2024)
- Marathon – 1:59:30 (London 2026) WR

Circuit wins

- Diamond League
  - 2022: Brussels Memorial Van Damme (One hour run)
