= Breaking4 =

2025 attempt to beat a 4-minute mile

Cover for the event

Breaking4 was an attempt by Kenyan middle-distance runner Faith Kipyegon to become the first woman to break the four-minute barrier for the mile. Hosted by Nike, the event took place on 26 June 2025 at the Stade Sébastien Charléty in Paris, France.

Kipyegon fell 6.91 seconds short of the four-minute barrier with a time of 4:06.91, still under her official world record by 0.73 seconds.

Nike later subtracted the reaction time, adjusting her official time to 4:06.42.

== Background ==
In 1954, Roger Bannister became the first man to break four minutes in the mile, running 3:59.4. That same year, Diane Leather became the first woman to break five minutes with 4:59.6. As of June 2025, according to World Athletics statistics, roughly 2,000 men have broken the four-minute barrier.

No woman has yet broken four minutes. The women's world record is 4:07.64, set by Kipyegon on 21 July 2023. An earlier women's world record, 4:12.56 set by Svetlana Masterkova of Russia in 1996, stood for almost 23 years, with Masterkova being the first woman to break 4:15 at the distance.

Kipyegon also holds the world record over 1500 metres, which at the time was 3:49.04, set in 2024, at the Stade Sébastien Charléty. (Note: Kipyegon has since improved her 1500 metre world record to 3:48.68, set in July 2025 at the Prefontaine Classic.) The time equates to roughly a 4:06 mile pace. Kipyegon's run has led some to speculate that the first women's sub-four minute mile may come within the 21st century.

In January 2025, at the Nike Headquarters in Beaverton, Oregon, Kipyegon did VO2 max testing along with other baseline tests in preparation for the attempt. In February 2025, a scientific study was published in the Royal Society Open Science, stating that Kipyegon could run a mile in approximately 3:59.37 under very specific conditions, achieved through ideal pacesetters and weather conditions.

In April 2025, it was announced that Kipyegon would attempt to become the first woman to run a sub-four-minute mile at a meeting in Paris on 26 June 2025.

== Setup and results ==
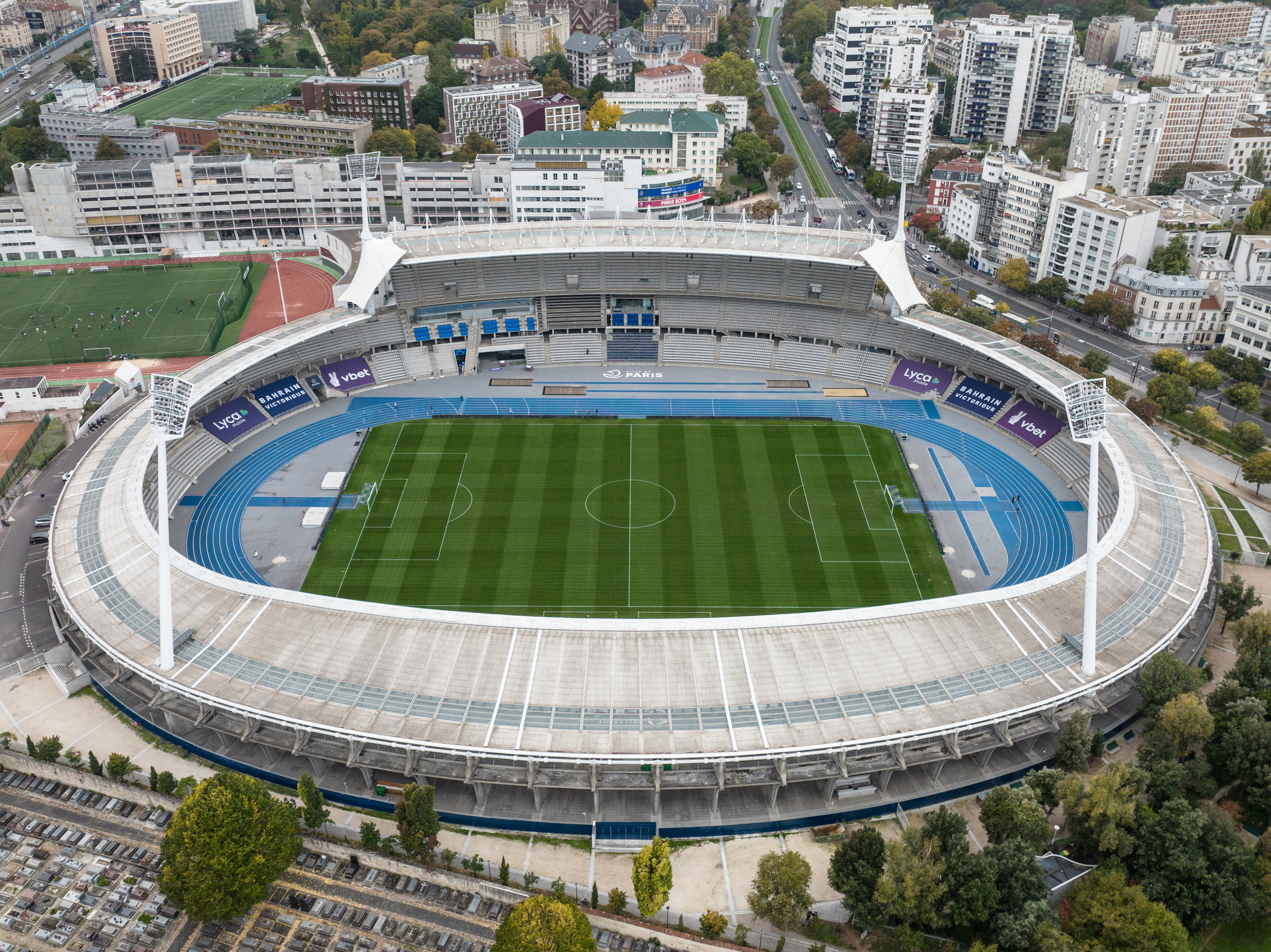
Stade Sébastien Charléty

The event was run in a similar manner to Nike's previous Breaking2 project for the marathon and the Ineos 1:59 challenge. It was not record eligible because the custom pair of Victory Elite FK spikes Kipyegon wore were not submitted for approval by World Athletics prior to the event.

In addition to the spikes, Kipyegon wore a specially designed speed suit and sports bra.

To break the barrier, she would have to improve on her 4:07.64 personal best by at least 7.65 seconds. Kipyegon fell 6.91 seconds short of the four-minute barrier with an unadjusted time of 4:06.91, which is still faster than her official world record by 0.73 seconds.

=== Pacers ===
Breaking4 utilized a dozen male and female pacemakers:

Name	Notes
Niels Laros	6th in 2024 Olympic 1500 m final
Grant Fisher	World record holder in short track 3000 m and 5000 m, 2-time Olympic bronze medalist
Craig Engels	3:51.60 mile personal best
Stewart McSweyn	7th in 2020 Olympic 1500 m final
Jemma Reekie	2024 800 m World Indoor silver medalist
Georgia Hunter Bell	2024 1500 m Olympic bronze medalist
Halima Nakaayi	2019 800 m world champion
Cooper Teare	3:50.17 mile personal best
Elliot Giles	World record holder in road mile
Wyclife Kinyamal	1:42.08 800 m personal best
Stefan Nillessen	Dutch 1500 m record holder
Cathal Doyle	3:52.06 mile personal best

== Criticisms and challenges ==
On 26 April 2025, Kipyegon ran 2:29.21 for 1000 metres at the Xiamen Diamond League, a time 0.06 seconds off her personal best of 2:29.15 and 0.23 seconds off Svetlana Masterkova's world record of 2:28.98. This time equates to a 4:00.08 mile pace. Robert Johnson of LetsRun.com considered the attempt to be "ludicrous," since Kipyegon would be required to hold a slightly faster pace for approximately 609 metres longer.

A scientific paper published in the Journal of Applied Physiology in April 2025 concluded that "there is no female athlete presently displaying the physiological characteristics required to run a sub-four minute mile."

The timing adjustment made by Nike to give her a flying start which was not announced before the event and only revealed after questioning from the media, provided another non-official advantage to Kipyegon that most running fans believed Nike should have been up-front about.

== Streaming ==
The event was streamed live on Prime Video and Nike's YouTube channel, beginning at 7:15 PM local time. The first episode of a docuseries covering the event premiered on 20 June.

== See also ==
- Four-minute mile
- Breaking2
- Ineos 1:59 Challenge
