= 2024 Valencia Marathon =

Race in Valencia, Spain

44th Valencia Marathon
- Venue: Valencia, Spain
- Date: December 1, 2024

Champions
- Men: Sabastian Sawe (KEN) (2:02:05)
- Women: Alemu Megertu (ETH) (2:16:49)

The 2024 Valencia Marathon was an Elite Platinum Label marathon race held in Valencia, Spain on December 1, 2024. It was the 44th running of the race.

== Results ==
28-year old Kenyan Sabastian Sawe won the elite men's title running 2:02:05 in his marathon debut and set the 2024 world leading time.

Alemu Megertu won the elite women's title by 2:16:49.

Elite men's top 10 finishers
Place	Athlete	Nationality	Time
1st place, gold medalist(s)	Sabastian Sawe	Kenya	2:02:05
2nd place, silver medalist(s)	Deresa Geleta	Ethiopia	2:02:38
3rd place, bronze medalist(s)	Daniel Mateiko	Kenya	2:04:24
4	Alphonce Felix Simbu	Tanzania	2:04:38
5	Tadesse Abraham	Switzerland	2:04:40
6	Chimdessa Debele	Ethiopia	2:04:44
7	Maru Teferi	Israel	2:04:44
8	Hillary Kipkoech	Kenya	2:04:45
9	Samuel Fitwi Sibhatu	Germany	2:04:56
10	Sisay Lemma	Ethiopia	2:04:59

Elite women's top 10 finishers
Place	Athlete	Nationality	Time
1st place, gold medalist(s)	Alemu Megertu	Ethiopia	2:16:49
2nd place, silver medalist(s)	Stella Chesang	Uganda	2:18:26
3rd place, bronze medalist(s)	Tiruye Mesfin	Ethiopia	2:18:35
4	Evaline Chirchir	Kenya	2:20:33
5	Majida Maayouf	Spain	2:21:43
6	Chimdesa Kumsa	Ethiopia	2:21:54
7	Laura Luengo	Spain	2:22:31
8	Isobel Batt-Doyle	Australia	2:22:59
9	Moira Stewartova	Czech Republic	2:23:44
10	Sara Hall	United States	2:23:45
