= Two-hour marathon =

Marathon running time barrier

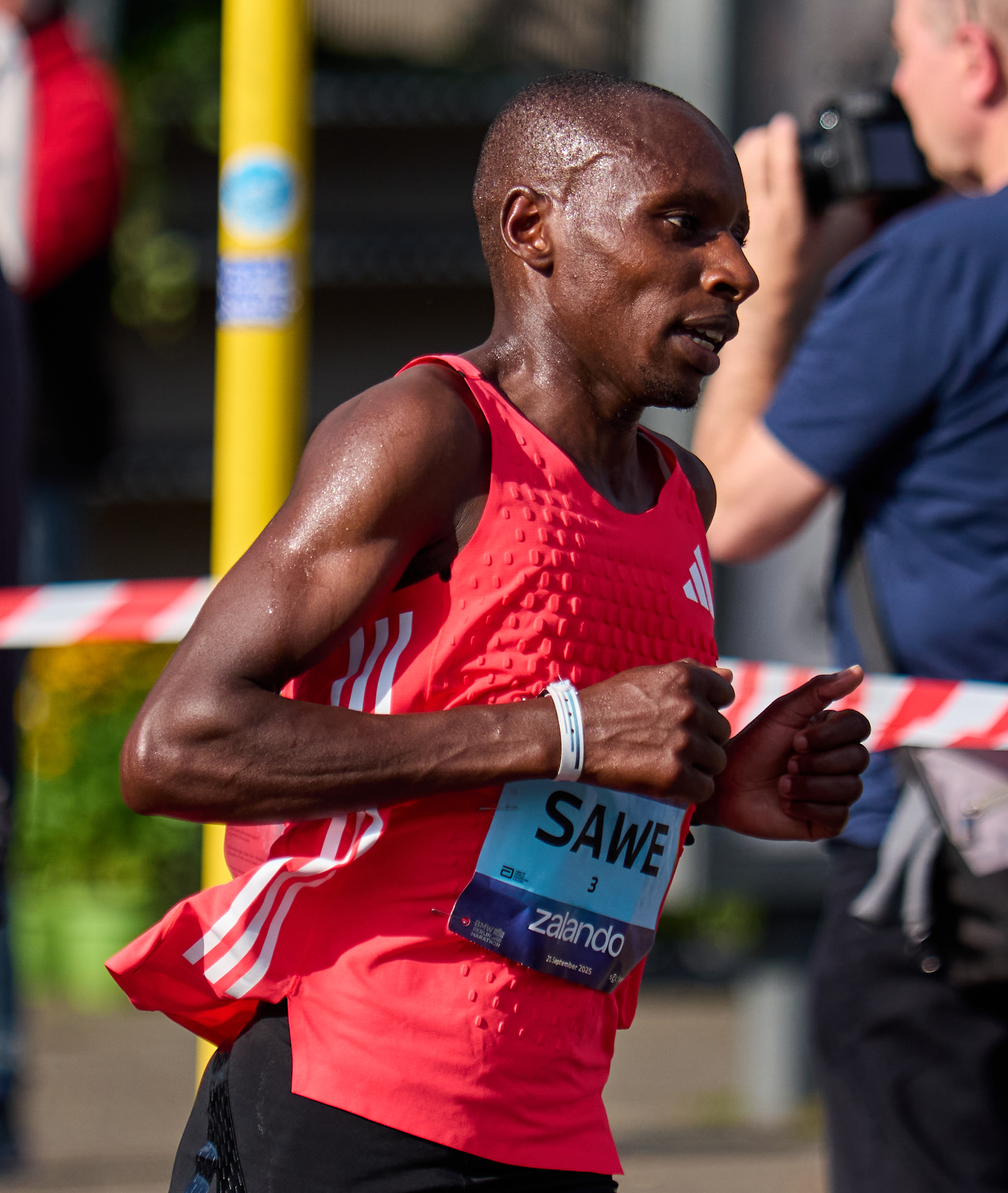
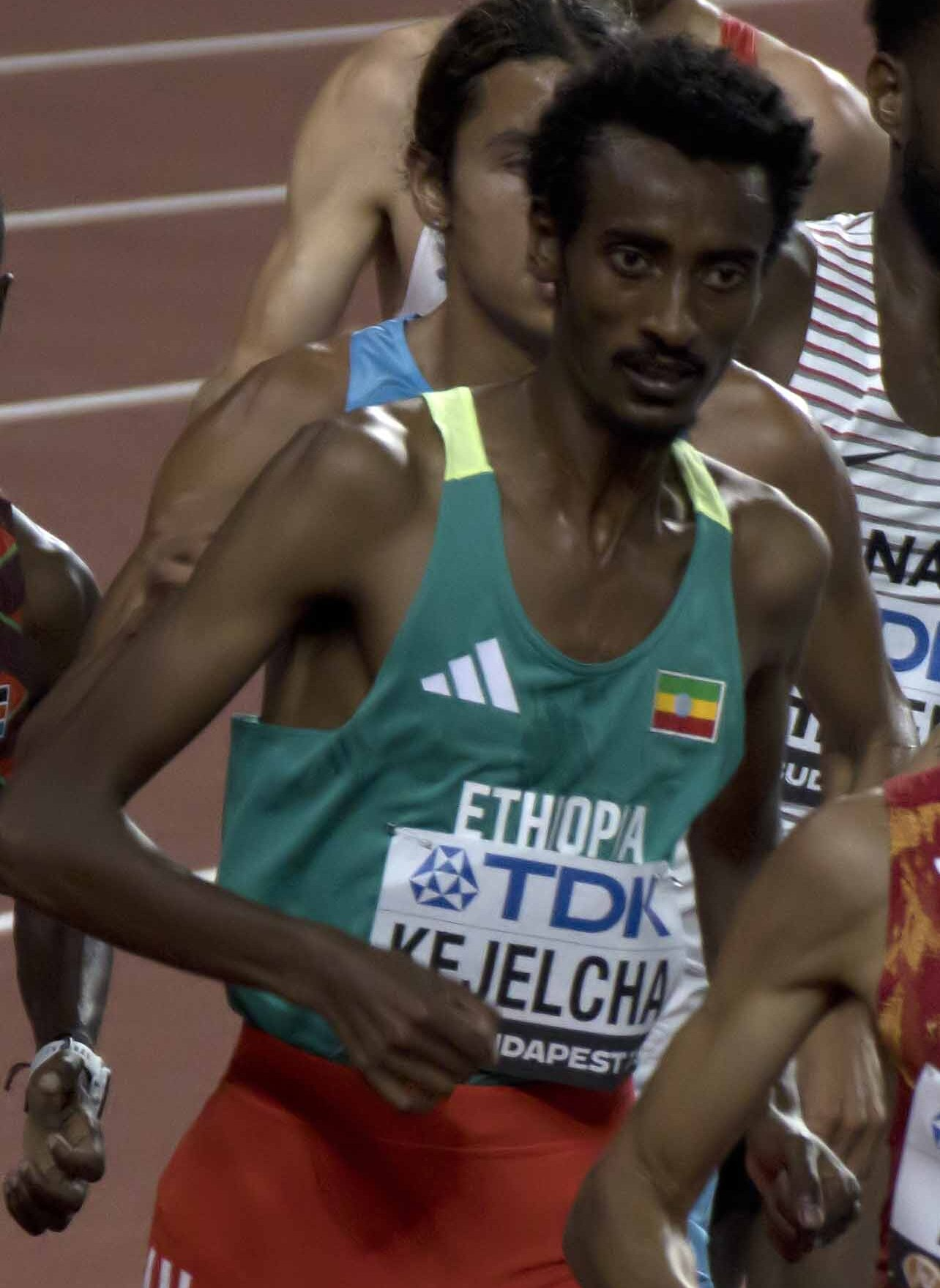
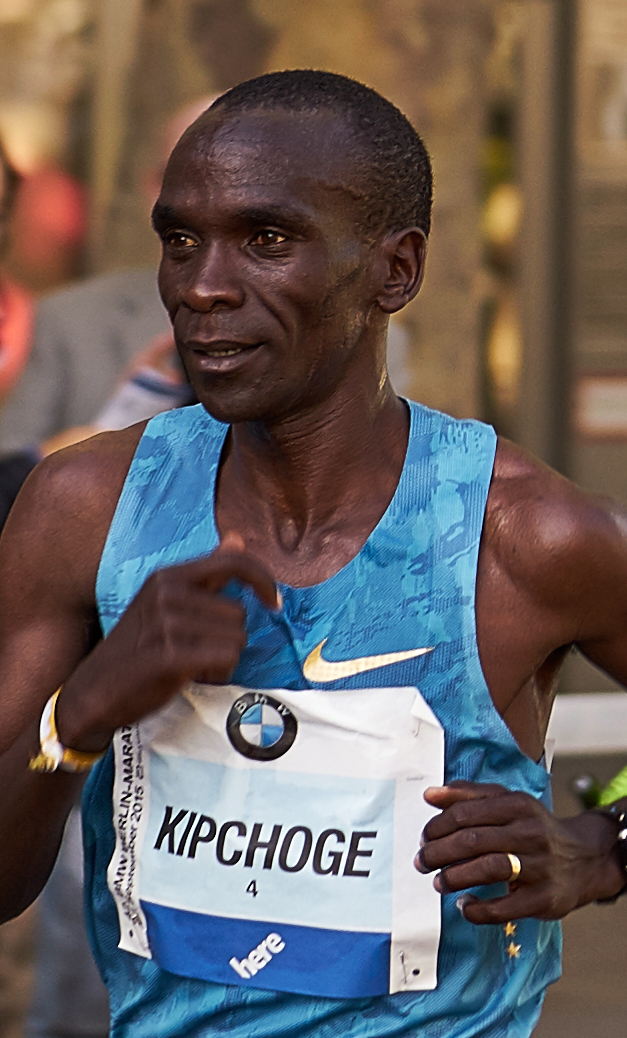
From left to right:
- Sabastian Sawe, the first athlete to break the two-hour marathon barrier with record-eligible conditions (2026 London Marathon, 1:59:30)
- Yomif Kejelcha also ran the 2026 London Marathon in under two hours, coming in second at 1:59:41
- Eliud Kipchoge ran the Ineos 1:59 Challenge, a 2019 exhibition race, in 1:59:40

The two-hour marathon, also referred to as the sub-two-hour marathon, is the physical and psychological barrier of completing the marathon, a distance of 42.195 kilometres (26.219 mi), in under two hours.

Originally thought to be impossible, various attempts were made to break the mark after the marathon distance was defined in the early 20th century. Counting all conditions, the barrier was first broken by Eliud Kipchoge in 2019 during the Ineos 1:59 Challenge, an exhibition race where Kipchoge used pacing and fueling techniques that made the attempt ineligible for ratification by World Athletics. It was first broken in record-eligible conditions by both Sabastian Sawe and Yomif Kejelcha at the 2026 London Marathon, who ran times of 1:59:30 and 1:59:41 respectively.

== History ==
The marathon distance, as then understood to be a race of about 25 miles (40 km), was first run at the 1896 Summer Olympics as an ode to Pheidippides' run at the Battle of Marathon in 490 BC. Spyridon Louis won the race in 2 hours, 58 minutes, and 50 seconds, becoming the first to break the 3-hour barrier before the modern marathon race distance was set at 42.195 kilometres (26.219 mi) in 1908 and standardized in 1921.

In May 1960, US marathon champion Buddy Edelen told the Metropolitan Track Writers' Association that it "won't be long" until the marathon is run under two hours. He said it would most likely be done by a sub-four-minute miler who moved to the roads after losing their sharpness on the track, and that it would require a fast opening mile and strength to continue with that pace. (Though the first sub-two marathon runner Sabastian Sawe had not run under four minutes in the mile, the second runner Yomif Kejelcha had previously held the indoor mile world record time of 3:47.01 before moving to the roads.)

Following Japanese runner Morio Shigematsu's 2:12:00 marathon world record in 1965, Sydney Wooderson stated in the Liverpool Echo, "Obviously it is now going to be possible for a marathon to be run inside two hours – and bang will go yet another barrier which would have brought only derision if any of us had made such a prediction 25 years ago". The mark was predicted to have been possible in a race between Shigematsu and then-Olympic champion Abebe Bikila under ideal conditions.

Several predictions have been made about when the first marathon under two hours would be achieved. In 2011, University of Montreal professor Francois Peronnet projected that the first sub-two-hour marathon would be run in the year 2028. In 2019, American exercise physiologist Michael Joyner predicted that the two-hour marathon would most likely be broken in May 2032. Others doubted it could be done; in 2013, LetsRun.com's Robert Johnson stated that "humans aren't close to doing it" and predicted that the two-hour marathon would not be broken during his lifetime.

The first high-profile time-trial attempt at the two-hour barrier was made by Nike, Inc. at the Breaking2 event in May 2017. Held on Formula One's Monza Circuit, the event featured three runners in Eliud Kipchoge, Zersenay Tadese, and Lelisa Desisa. Kipchoge faded to 2:00:25 after remaining on-pace through 30 kilometres (19 mi), though the mark was not record-eligible as his human pacers were allowed to enter and exit the race at will (in contravention of World Athletics rules that pacers can only block wind for as long as they can run from the beginning of the race).

Two years later, a similar time-trial event was staged in Vienna at the Ineos 1:59 Challenge, this time only featuring Kipchoge with a team of 41 pacemakers. The two-hour barrier was broken with a 1:59:40 finishing time, ending with Kipchoge performing a negative split after a 59:59 first half. Like the Breaking2 event, the race was not sanctioned by World Athletics and did not count as a marathon world record.

In April 2026, Sabastian Sawe and Yomif Kejelcha became the first runners to break the two-hour barrier with record-eligible conditions at the 2026 London Marathon. Sawe, the defending champion, ran 1:59:30 to set a three-minute personal record, while Kejelcha, an accomplished track runner, ran 1:59:41 for 2nd in his marathon debut.

== Wheelchair performances ==
In 1980, Curt Brinkman became the first wheelchair racer to complete the marathon distance in under two hours with a 1:55:00 time. He performed the feat at the 1980 Boston Marathon, beating the previous wheelchair world record of 2 hours and 34 minutes and also becoming the first wheelchair athlete to beat the able-bodied runners at the Boston Marathon. Danish wheelchair racer Connie Hansen became the first woman to complete the marathon in under two hours at the 1989 Boston Marathon, beating Candace Cable's 2:02:15 mark set the previous year. As of 2026, the fastest men's and women's wheelchair marathons are 1:17:47 by Marcel Hug of Switzerland and 1:34:16 by Catherine Debrunner of Switzerland respectively.

== Factors ==
Various factors have been proposed as necessary to run a sub-two-hour marathon. A team led by Andrew Jones of the University of Exeter suggested three primary physiological factors in 2020: a high VO_{2} max, excellent running economy, and a high lactate turn point.

=== Footwear ===
The first carbon fiber-plated running shoes were developed by American footwear company Nike and debuted as a prototype at the 2016 United States Olympic trials. Over the following years, the technology was eventually adapted by other brands, creating a class of footwear dubbed super shoes that led to improvements in most road running world records. The shoes have been compared to full-body suits in competitive swimming, which were banned by World Aquatics in 2010 after their performance impact was demonstrated.

The shoes served to increase the amount of bounce and energy recovery received by athletes. Sawe's record-breaking run used a newly-released shoe from Adidas – the Adios Pro Evo 3 – which weighed 97 grams (3.4 oz) for a men's shoe of US size 9.5, less than leading super shoes from Nike, while still maintaining a large 39-millimetre stack height. Other athletes who wore the shoe at the 2026 London Marathon also broke records, including runner-up Yomif Kejelcha who also ran under two hours.

== List ==
As of April 2026, two runners have broken the two-hour marathon barrier on a record-eligible course and conditions, while one has broken the barrier in an exhibition race with illegal pacing.

List of sub-two-hour marathon performances
Time	Athlete	Nationality	Date	Race	Place	Ref.
1:59:30	Sabastian Sawe	Kenya	26 April 2026	2026 London Marathon	1st	
1:59:40 (Note: Kipchoge's record time did not count as a record for three primary reasons: The human pacers were allowed to enter and exit the race at will, while under legal conditions pacers can only pace for as long as they can run from the start of the race; an electric car was able to set the pace and block wind at a closer than usual distance; and cyclists were able to give Kipchoge food and water at any point throughout the race while in record conditions athletes can only grab fuel at designated stations.)	Eliud Kipchoge	Kenya	12 October 2019	Ineos 1:59 Challenge	1st	
1:59:41	Yomif Kejelcha	Ethiopia	26 April 2026	2026 London Marathon	2nd	

== See also ==
- Marathon world record progression
- Four-minute mile
- 10-second barrier
