= 2017 Berlin Marathon =

44th Berlin Marathon
- Venue: Berlin, Germany
- Dates: 24 September 2017

Champions
- Men: Eliud Kipchoge (2:03:32)
- Women: Gladys Cherono (2:20:23)

The 2017 Berlin Marathon was the 44th edition of the Berlin Marathon. The marathon took place in Berlin, Germany, on 24 September 2017 and was the fourth World Marathon Majors race of the year.

The men's race was won by Eliud Kipchoge, who failed to break the world record in rainy conditions, but withstood the terrific challenge of unknown marathon debutant Guye Adola. The women's race was won by Gladys Cherono of Kenya in 2:20:23, beating out Ruti Aga of Ethiopia by less than 20 seconds.

== Results ==
Race results

=== Men ===
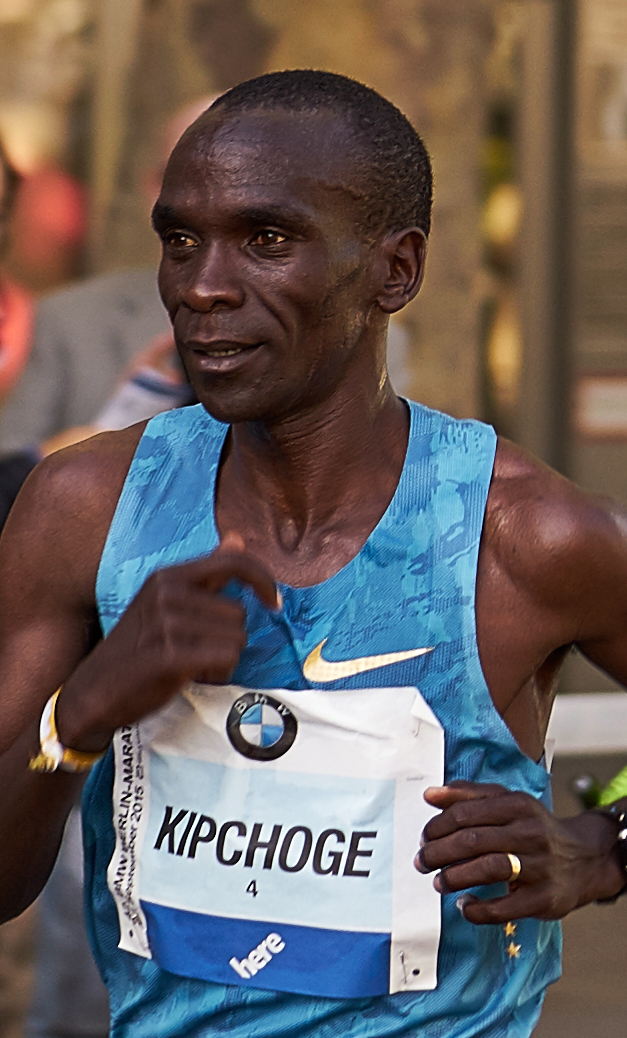
Eliud Kipchoge in the 2015 Berlin Marathon

Position	Athlete	Nationality	Time
1st place, gold medalist(s)	Eliud Kipchoge	Kenya	2:03:32
2nd place, silver medalist(s)	Guye Adola	Ethiopia	2:03:46
3rd place, bronze medalist(s)	Mosinet Geremew	Ethiopia	2:06:09
4	Felix Kandie	Kenya	2:06:13
5	Vincent Kipruto	Kenya	2:06:14
6	Yuta Shitara	Japan	2:09:03
7	Hiroaki Sano	Japan	2:11:24
8	Ryan Vail	United States	2:12:40
9	Liam Adams	Australia	2:12:52
10	Jonathan Mellor	Great Britain	2:12:57

=== Women ===
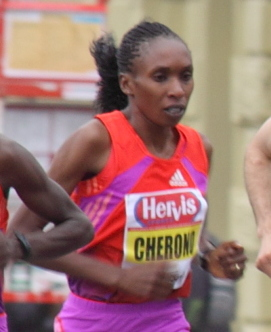
Gladys Cherono, seen here in the 2012 Prague Half Marathon

Position	Athlete	Nationality	Time
1st place, gold medalist(s)	Gladys Cherono	Kenya	2:20:23
2nd place, silver medalist(s)	Ruti Aga	Ethiopia	2:20:41
3rd place, bronze medalist(s)	Valary Aiyabei	Kenya	2:20:53
4	Helen Tola	Ethiopia	2:22:51
5	Anna Hahner	Germany	2:28:32
6	Catherine Bertone	Italy	2:28:34
7	Sonia Samuels	United Kingdom	2:29:34
8	Azucena Diaz	Spain	2:30:31
9	Catarina Ribeiro	Portugal	2:33:13
10	Kim Dillen	Netherlands	2:33:24
