= Eliud Kipchoge =

Kenyan long-distance runner (born 1984)

Eliud Kipchoge EGH
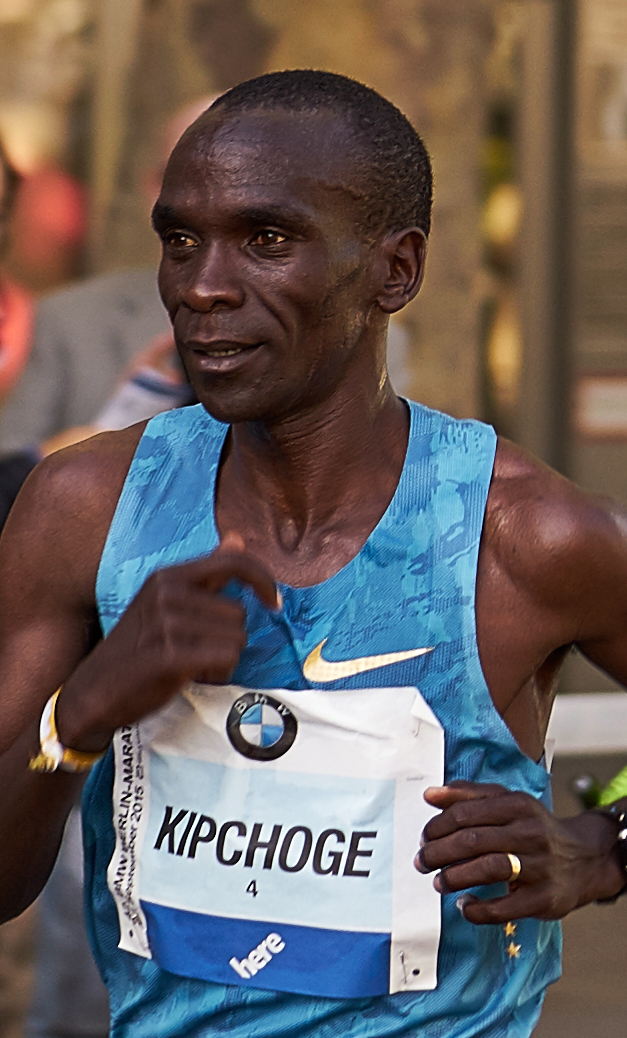
- Kipchoge at the 2015 Berlin Marathon

Personal information
- Born: 5 November 1984 (age 42) Kapsisiywa, Rift Valley Province, Kenya (today in Nandi County)
- Height: 170 cm (5 ft 7 in)
- Weight: 52 kg (115 lb)

Sport
- Country: Kenya
- Sport: Athletics
- Events: Marathon, 5000 m
- Team: NN Running Team
- Coached by: Patrick Sang

Achievements and titles
- Olympic finals: 2004 Athens; 5000 m, Bronze; 2008 Beijing; 5000 m, Silver; 2016 Rio de Janeiro; Marathon, Gold; 2020 Tokyo; Marathon, Gold
- World finals: 2003 Paris; 5000 m, Gold; 2005 Helsinki; 5000 m, 4th 2007 Osaka; 5000 m, Silver; 2009 Berlin; 5000 m, 5th 2011 Daegu; 5000 m, 7th
- Highest world ranking: 1st (2023)
- Personal bests: Marathon: 2:01:09 (Berlin 2022); Marathon: 1:59:40 (Note: Set on closed course under non-race conditions including rotating pacemakers and pace car.) (Vienna 2019); 10,000 m: 26:49.02 (Hengelo 2007); 5000 m: 12:46.53 (Rome 2004); Mile: 3:50.40 (London 2004)
Medal record
Event	1st	2nd	3rd
Olympic Games	2	1	1
World Championships	1	1	0
World Cross Country Championships	1	0	0
World Indoor Championships	0	0	1
Commonwealth Games	0	1	0
World Marathon Majors	11	1	0
Total	14	4	2
Olympic Games
Gold medal – first place	2016 Rio de Janeiro	Marathon
Gold medal – first place	2020 Tokyo	Marathon
Silver medal – second place	2008 Beijing	5000 m
Bronze medal – third place	2004 Athens	5000 m
World Championships
Gold medal – first place	2003 Paris	5000 m
Silver medal – second place	2007 Osaka	5000 m
World Indoor Championships
Bronze medal – third place	2006 Moscow	3000 m
Commonwealth Games
Silver medal – second place	2010 Delhi	5000 m
World Cross Country Championships
Gold medal – first place	2003 Lausanne	Junior race
World Marathon Majors
Gold medal – first place	2014 Chicago	Marathon
Gold medal – first place	2015 Berlin	Marathon
Gold medal – first place	2015 London	Marathon
Gold medal – first place	2016 London	Marathon
Gold medal – first place	2017 Berlin	Marathon
Gold medal – first place	2018 London	Marathon
Gold medal – first place	2018 Berlin	Marathon
Gold medal – first place	2019 London	Marathon
Gold medal – first place	2021 Tokyo	Marathon
Gold medal – first place	2022 Berlin	Marathon
Gold medal – first place	2023 Berlin	Marathon
Silver medal – second place	2013 Berlin	Marathon

Eliud Kipchoge EGH (English: /ˈɛlɪjud kɪpˈtʃoʊɡeɪ/ ELL-ih-yood kip-CHOH-gay; born 5 November 1984) is a Kenyan long-distance runner who competes in the marathon and formerly specialized in the 5000 metres. Kipchoge is the 2016 and 2020 Olympic marathon champion, and was the world record holder in the marathon from 2018 to 2023, until that record was broken by Kelvin Kiptum at the 2023 Chicago Marathon. He is widely considered to be one of the greatest marathon runners of all time.

Kipchoge claimed his first individual world championship title in 2003 by winning the junior race at the World Cross Country Championships and setting a world junior record for the 5000 m. At the age of eighteen, he became the senior 5000 m world champion at the 2003 World Championships with a championship record, then followed by an Olympic bronze for Kenya in 2004 and a bronze at the 2006 World Indoor Championships. A five-time World Championship 5000 m finalist, Kipchoge took silver medals at the 2007 World Championships, 2008 Beijing Olympics, and 2010 Commonwealth Games.

He switched to road running in 2012 and made the second-fastest half marathon debut ever, at 59:25. In his marathon debut, he won the 2013 Hamburg Marathon in a course record time. His first victory at a World Marathon Major came at the Chicago Marathon in 2014, and he went on to become series champion a record five times – for 2016, 2017, 2018, 2019 and 2022. He has won the London Marathon a record four times and also holds the record for most Berlin Marathon wins with five, his latest coming in September 2023. With 15 victories in his first 18 marathons from 2013 to 2023, Kipchoge's only losses were a second-place finish behind Wilson Kipsang Kiprotich at the 2013 Berlin Marathon, where Kipsang broke the world record; an eighth-place finish at the 2020 London Marathon and a sixth place in his debut at the Boston Marathon in 2023. He has since 2024, been defeated in his last three marathons. Kipchoge's last world record run broke by 30 seconds his own 2018 world record, which was in turn a 78-second improvement over the existing best, the greatest improvement in a marathon world record time since 1967.

On 12 October 2019, Kipchoge ran the marathon distance for the Ineos 1:59 Challenge in Vienna, achieving a time of 1:59:40.2, becoming the first person in recorded history to do a sub-two-hour marathon. The run did not count as a new marathon record, as he ran with specialized shoes, standard competition rules for pacing and fluids were not followed, and it was not an open event.

Kipchoge was appointed Elder of the Order of the Golden Heart by former Kenyan President Uhuru Kenyatta on 20 October 2019 in recognition of his sub-two-hour marathon. He was also named the 2019 BBC World Sport Star of the Year. In 2023 he was awarded the Princess of Asturias Award in the category "Sports".

== Personal life ==
Kipchoge was born on 5 November 1984 in Kapsisiywa, Nandi County, in Kenya. He graduated from the Kaptel Secondary School in Nandi County in 1999 but did not run seriously or as a profession then. He ran three kilometres (2 mi) to school on a daily basis. Kipchoge was raised by a single mother (a teacher), and only knew his father from pictures. He is the youngest of four children. He met his trainer Patrick Sang (a former Olympic medalist in the steeplechase) in 2001 at the age of 16.

Kipchoge's wife and three children live in Eldoret, Kenya. He lives and trains in Kaptagat, 30 km (19 miles) from Eldoret. He is a devout Catholic.

Following the death of Kelvin Kiptum in 2024, Kipchoge and his family faced online threats falsely accusing him of being involved in Kiptum's death. These threats impacted his training and well-being.

== Career ==
=== 2002–2004 ===
In 2002, he won at the Kenyan trials for the 2002 IAAF World Cross Country Championships junior race. At the World Cross Country Championships, held in Dublin, Kipchoge finished fifth in the individual race and was part of the Kenyan junior team that won gold. Kipchoge also won the 5000-meter race at the Kenyan trial for the 2002 World Junior Championships in Athletics but fell ill and missed the championships. He won the junior race at the 2003 IAAF World Cross Country Championships.

He set a world junior record in the 5000 m at the 2003 Bislett Games, running a time of 12:52.61 minutes. This stood as the world and African junior record until 2012, when it was improved to 12:47.53 minutes by Hagos Gebrhiwet of Ethiopia.

Kipchoge won a gold medal at the 5000 m final at the 2003 World Championships in Paris, outsprinting runner-up Hicham El Guerrouj, the world record holder in the 1500 metres and mile, by four-hundredths of a second in 12:52.79.

In July, he participated in the Golden League 2004 Roma Meeting. In the 5000 m event, he dipped first among the starters with 12:46.53, which made him the sixth-fastest ever in the event.

In 2004, Kipchoge won a bronze medal in the 5000 m final at the 2004 Athens Olympics, behind El Guerrouj and Kenenisa Bekele. He also won the Trofeo Alasport cross country race earlier that season.

=== 2006–2009 ===
Kipchoge won the bronze in the 3000 metres indoor at the 2006 World Championships in Moscow.

At the end of the year, Kipchoge won the San Silvestre Vallecana New Year's Eve 10 km road race in a time of 26:54 minutes, which beat his own course record by 40 seconds. This time was also better than the 10K road world record at the time but was run on a downhill course.

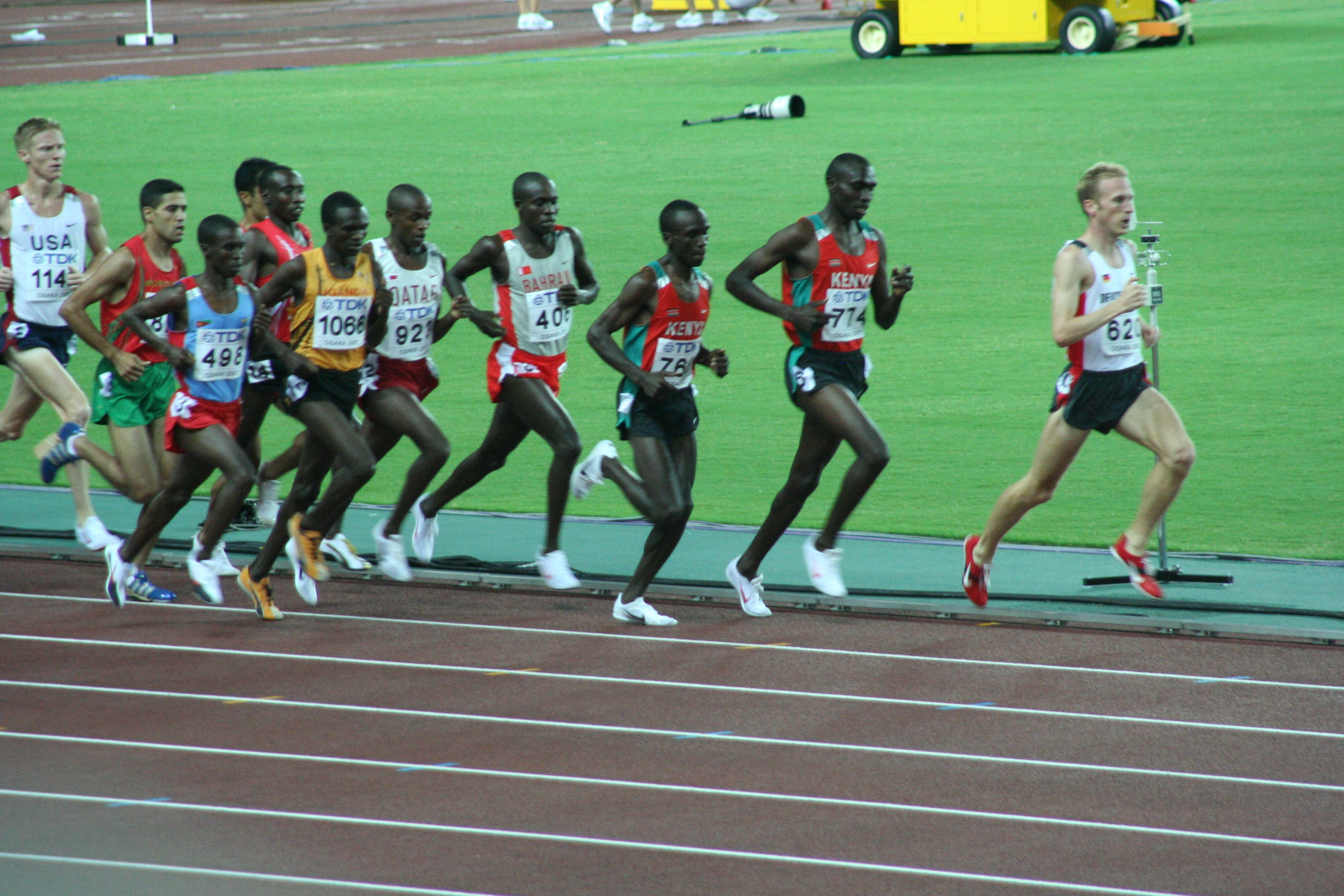
Kipchoge (third from the right) during the 5000 m heat at the 2007 World Championships in Osaka. He won a silver medal in the final.

Kipchoge won a silver medal at the 5000 m final of the 2007 World Championships at Osaka in 13:46.00, behind Bernard Lagat (13:45.87).

During the 2008 Olympics held in Beijing, China, Kipchoge won a silver medal in the 5000 m event with a time of 13:02.80; although better than the previous Olympic record of 13:05.59, it was not enough to match Kenenisa Bekele's pace, who won the gold medal for this race. On the circuit, he won the Great Yorkshire Run 10K and Campaccio Cross Country that year.

He failed to reach the podium at the 2009 World Championships in Athletics, finishing in fifth place. He also finished ninth in the 3000 m at the 2009 IAAF World Athletics Final.

=== 2010–2011 ===
He made his debut on the 2010 IAAF Diamond League by winning the 5000 m Qatar Athletic Super Grand Prix in a meet record time.

Kipchoge then entered the Carlsbad 5000 in California, United States. The Carlsbad 5 km road race is the venue for the world's best times for a 5k road race for men and women, respectively. The fastest to cover the track was Sammy Kipketer in 2000, with 12:59.52 min. Kipchoge made a world best attempt, and although he won the race, weather affected his chances, and he finished in 13:11, the fourth-fastest ever for the course up to that point in time.

In the first athletics final of the 2010 Commonwealth Games, he attempted to win the 5000 m Commonwealth title. Ugandan runner Moses Kipsiro held a slender lead over him in the race's final stages, and Kipchoge ended up in second place, taking the silver medal some seven-hundredths of a second behind. He flew back to Europe immediately after to take part in the Belgrade Race through History the following day. His shoe fell off in the first kilometre, and, after putting it back on, he made up much ground on the field to eventually take second place two seconds behind Josphat Menjo.

At the start of 2011, he won the short race at the Great Edinburgh Cross Country, ahead of Asbel Kiprop. He attempted to retain his title at the Carlsbad 5000 in April but came a close second behind Dejen Gebremeskel. In May he raced the 3000 metres (finished third) in Doha, with a time of 7:27.66 and ranked him as the 12th-fastest at the distance up to this point. Kipchoge was chosen to represent Kenya at the 2011 World Championships in Athletics and reached the 5000 m final for the fifth consecutive time, although he only managed seventh place on this occasion.

=== 2012 ===
Kipchoge returned to the Edinburgh Cross Country in 2012, but this time he finished third behind Asbel Kiprop and Britain's Jonathan Hay. He was also third at the Carlsbad 5000 in March. He attempted to gain a place on the 10,000 m Olympic team at the Prefontaine Classic, but fell back in the late stages of the Kenyan trial race, finishing seventh. A seventh-place finish in the Kenyan 5000 m trial race meant he would not make a third consecutive Olympic team.

He made his half marathon debut in the Lille Half Marathon. The run was won by a new course record time of 59:05 (previously 59:36 by ilahun Regassa set in 2008) by Ezekiel Chebii (former personal_best 59:22), trailed by Bernard Koech 59:10, and Kipchoge earned a third place with 59:25. His time of 59:25 became the second fastest Half Marathon debut, only second to Moses Mosop's 59:20 in Milan in 2010.

On 6 October 2012, Kipchoge ran at the 2012 IAAF World Half Marathon Championships in Kavarna, Bulgaria. Zersenay Tadese of Eritrea won in 1:00:19, and Kipchoge placed sixth in 1:01:52.

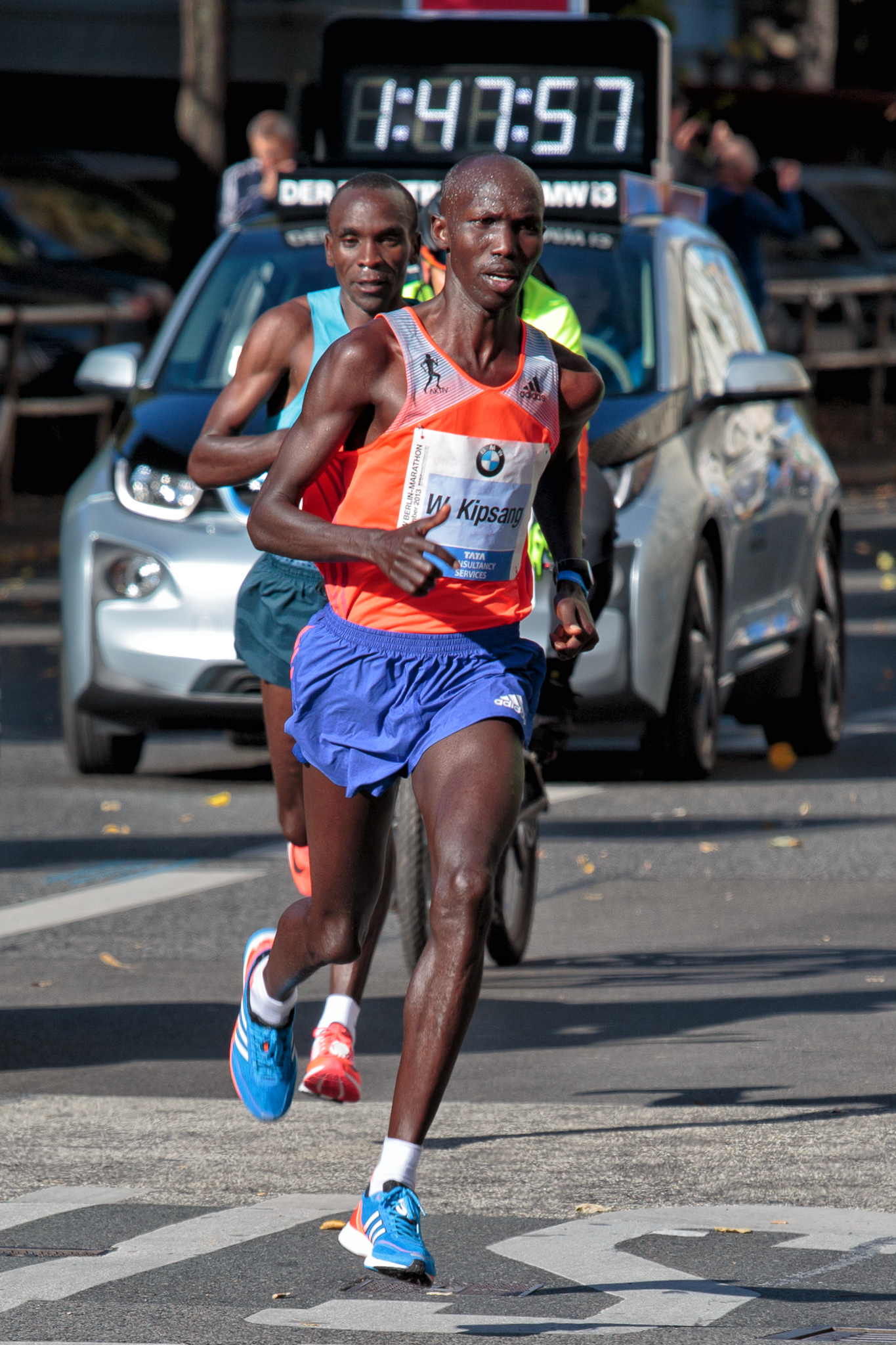
Wilson Kipsang (front) and Kipchoge (behind) running in the 2013 Berlin Marathon in which Kipsang set the world record with 2:03:23 and Kipchoge, racing in his second marathon, finished second, 42 seconds later.

=== 2013 ===
Kipchoge opened his 2013 season with a win at the Barcelona Half Marathon in a time of one hour and four seconds. Making his marathon debut in April, he demonstrated a smooth transition to the longer distance by taking the Hamburg Marathon title with a run of 2:05:30 hours (with a half marathon split time of 1:03:13 hours), beating the field by over two minutes and setting a new course record. In August 2013, he won the Half Marathon of Klagenfurt in 1:01:02 minutes.

Then, he raced in the 2013 Berlin Marathon and finished second in 2:04:05 (with a half marathon split time of 1:01:32 hours), the fifth-fastest time in history, in his second-ever marathon, behind Wilson Kipsang, who set a new marathon world record with 2:03:23. Third place went to Geoffrey Kamworor of Kenya with 2:06:26. This was the ninth world record set at the Berlin Marathon.

=== 2015 ===
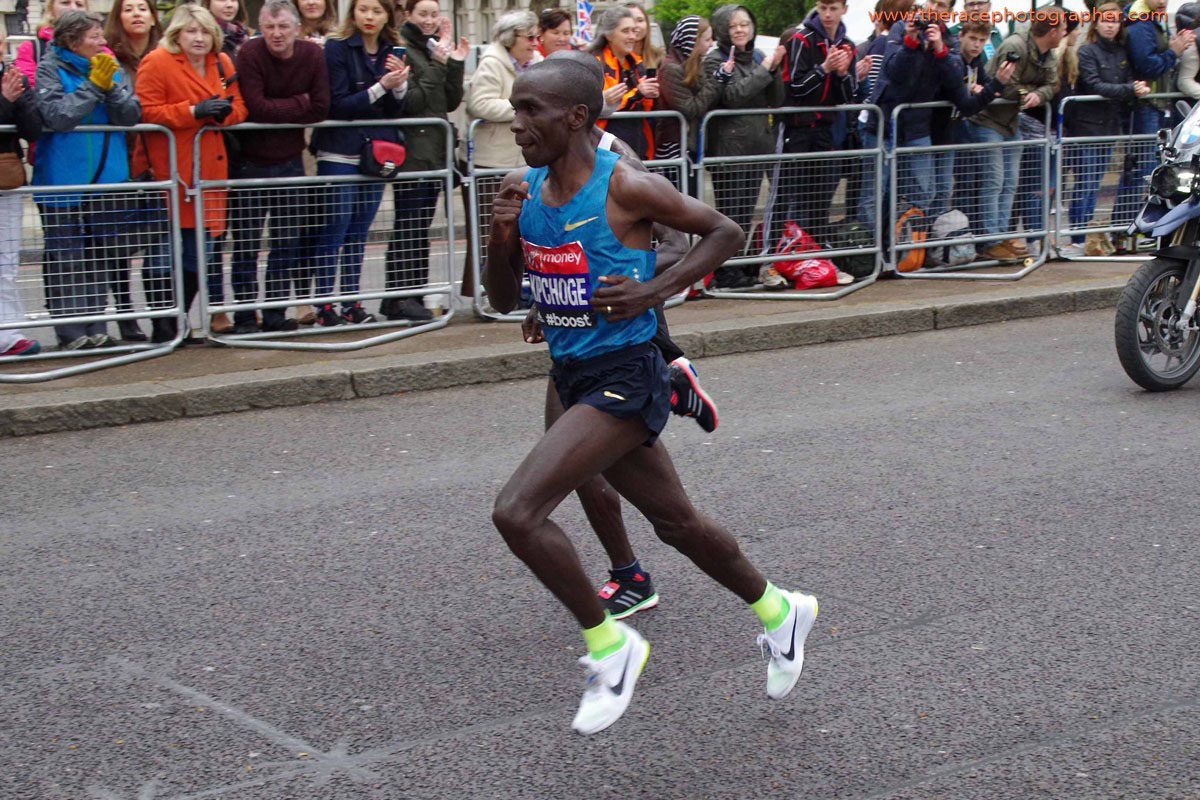
Kipchoge races in the 2015 London Marathon.

On 2 February, Kipchoge participated in the Ras al-Khaimah Half Marathon. He placed sixth with a time of 1:00:50. The run was won by Mosinet Geremew (Ethiopia) in 1:00:05. Kipchoge ran 2:04:42 to win the 2015 London Marathon in April. He also won the 2015 Berlin Marathon later in the year. His win and then-personal best time (2:04:00) occurred even though his shoes malfunctioned, causing his insoles to flap out of both shoes from 10 km onward; rather than risk time lost from an adjustment, he finished the race with bloodied, blistered feet.

=== 2016 ===
In April, Kipchoge won the 2016 London Marathon for the second consecutive year in a time of 2:03:05. His performance broke the course record in London and became the second-fastest marathon time in history, missing Dennis Kimetto's world record by 8 seconds.

Rio Olympic Games

As the prerace favourite, during the 2016 Rio Summer Olympics, Kipchoge gained a gold medal in the marathon event. On the last day of the Olympic Games on 21 August 2016, he won in a time of 2:08:44. The runner up was Feyisa Lilesa (Ethiopia) in 2:09:54 and the bronze medal went to Galen Rupp (USA), doing his second marathon, crossing the finish line in 2:10:05. When the halfway point after 21.0975 km was reached, 37 men were within 10 seconds of the lead runner. The participants' field diminished to 3 lead runners shortly before 34 km. Kipchoge made his final move on silver medal winner Lilesa around 36 km into the race. He covered the first half of the race in 1:05:55 while doing the second half in 1:02:49, which amounts to a difference of more than 3 minutes, a negative split. The winning gap between Kipchoge and Lilesa by 70 seconds was the largest victory margin since the 1972 Olympic marathon. Kipchoge's winning time of 2:08:44 was, as of August 2021, his slowest marathon time. One hundred fifty-five runners started the race, the largest field in Olympic history; 140 of them finished the race. With this win, Kipchoge became the second Kenyan male after Sammy Wanjiru in Beijing 2008 to win an Olympic marathon gold medal. At the same Olympics, the women's marathon was won by Jemima Sumgong, who became the first female Kenyan winner.

On 20 November 2016, Kipchoge ran in the Airtel Delhi Half Marathon, winning the race, clocking a time of 59:44.

=== 2017 ===
On 6 May, Kipchoge, along with Zersenay Tadese (then world record holder in the half marathon) and Lelisa Desisa (2-time Boston Marathon winner), attempted the first sub-two-hour assisted marathon in the Nike Breaking2 project on the Monza Formula 1 racetrack near Milan, Italy. All three runners ran a test 2 months before the attempt. The target time was 1 hour for a half Marathon. Kipchoge finished first in 59:17. The course was measured at 2400 m per lap. During the 2-hour attempt, the runners were paced by a lead car and 30 supporting pacers joining in stages (both considered illegal under IAAF rules). The race started at 5:45h local time on the 2.4 km track. Kipchoge finished in 2:00:25, while the other two had to slow and finished far behind. The runners planned even 14:13 5k splits to break 2 hours. His 5k splits were: 14:14, 14:07, 14:13, 14:15, 14:14, 14:17, 14:17, 14:27, and 6:20 to finish. The 5k split times from 25k and further would be world records: 25k in 1:11:03, 30k in 1:25:20, 35k in 1:39:37, 40k in 1:54:04.

On 24 September, he won the 2017 Berlin Marathon in a time of 2:03:32. In rainy conditions, he finished 14 seconds ahead of Guye Adola who ran his first marathon, and set the fastest marathon debut ever. Former marathon world record holder Wilson Kipsang and 2016 winner Kenenisa Bekele failed to finish.

=== 2018 ===
Kipchoge won the London Marathon in a time of 2:04:17 with a half marathon split time of 1:01:00. In a time of 2:04:49 Shura Kitata (Ethiopia) came in second and Mo Farah (Great Britain) finished in 2:06:21, a British record. Kenenisa Bekele finished sixth 2:08:53 and defending champion Daniel Wanjiru. eighth 2:10:35. Kipchoge confirmed question on attempting to break the Marathon world record. The women's race saw a win by Vivian Cheriuyot (Kenya) with a time of 2:18:31 the 4th best time ever and Brigid Kosgei (Kenya) place second in 2:20:13.

==== 2018 Berlin and first world marathon record ====
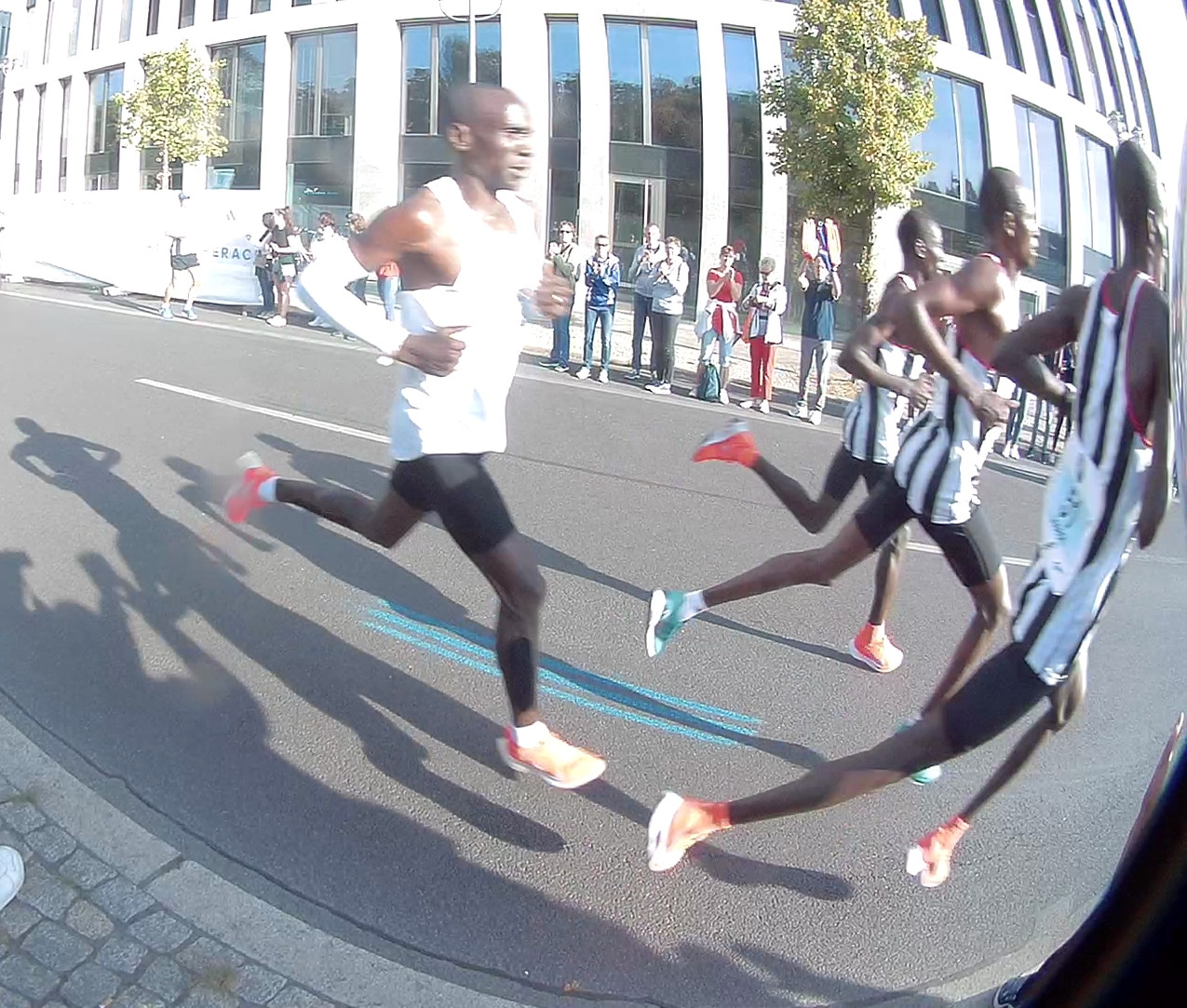
Eliud Kipchoge (L) and his three pacers (R) about 30 minutes into the run en route to the marathon world record in 2018. He is shown a few seconds before crossing the river Spree.

"A 2:01:39 in the Marathon is like a Mars landing for Space travel."

— Neue Zürcher Zeitung

"Whatever happens, this will surely go down as Kipchoge's crowning glory, his marathon opus. It would be no surprise if his record stood for a generation unless, of course, he himself has other ideas."

— The Guardian

"In an astonishing performance at the 2018 BMW Berlin Marathon, Kipchoge took marathoning into a new stratosphere by clocking 2:01:39 – the first man ever under 2:02, and a full 78 seconds faster than Dennis Kimetto's four-year-old world record.

It was a performance so far superior to anything we've seen before that comparing it to another marathon feels inadequate. This was Wilt Chamberlain's 100-point game in basketball, Usain Bolt's 9.58 in the 100-meter dash.

Kipchoge's splits – 1:01:06 for the first half, a ridiculous 1:00:33 for his second half – sound made up. But they were real, and they were spectacular."

— LetsRun.com

On 16 September, Kipchoge won the 2018 Berlin Marathon in a time of 2:01:39, breaking the previous world record by 1 minute and 18 seconds (2:02:57 set by fellow countryman Dennis Kimetto at the Berlin Marathon in 2014). It was the greatest improvement in a marathon world record time since 1967. He finished 4:43 min ahead of second-placed fellow Kenyan Amos Kipruto. The world record holder from 2013, Wilson Kipsang of Kenya, came in third at 2:06:48. It was the 11th world record set at the Berlin Marathon.

Berlin 2018 Marathon split times
Distance	Split	Time	Notes
5k	14:24	14:24	
10k	14:37	29:01	
15k	14:36	43:37	
20k	14:19	57:56	
Half Marathon	(3:10)	1:01:06	
25k	14:28	1:12:24	(WBP 1:11:18, Dennis Kipruto Kimetto)
30k	14:21	1:26:45	(WBP 1:27:13, Eliud Kipchoge/Stanley Biwott)
35k	14:16	1:41:01	(BP 1:41:47, Dennis Kipruto Kimetto)
40k	14:31	1:55:32	(BP 1:56:29, Dennis Kipruto Kimetto)
Marathon	(6:08)	2:01:39	(WR 2:02:57, Dennis Kipruto Kimetto)

==== 2018 accolades ====
Following his performances in the 2018 season, Kipchoge received numerous accolades and awards. He was named IAAF World Athlete of the Year together with Caterine Ibargüen, who received the female World Athlete of the Year award. On 11 January 2019, Kipchoge was named the 2018 Sportsman of the Year at the Kenyan Sports Personality of the Year Awards in Mombasa, Kenya.

=== 2019 ===
Kipchoge won the 2019 London Marathon in a time of 2:02:37, the second fastest marathon ever at that time, behind his 2018 Berlin Marathon win. He became the first man to win the event four times and set a new course record, beating his own 2016 London Marathon best by 28 seconds. The lead runner passed the half marathon mark in 1:01:37. Mosinet Geremew (Ethiopia) finished as the runner up in 2:02:55 and Mule Wasihun (Ethiopia) came in third place in 2:03:16. The British runner Mo Farah, a four-time Olympic gold medalist and a pre-race favourite, finished 5th.

==== Ineos 1:59 Challenge ====
In May 2019, a few days after his London Marathon win, Kipchoge announced another take on the sub-two-hour marathon, named the Ineos 1:59 Challenge. On 12 October 2019 in Vienna's Prater park, he ran 4.4 laps of the Hauptallee in 1:59:40, becoming the first person in recorded history to break the two-hour barrier over a marathon distance.

The effort did not count as a new world record under IAAF rules due to the setup of the challenge. Specifically, it was not an open event; Kipchoge was handed fluids by his support team throughout; the run featured a pace car and included rotating teams of other runners pacing Kipchoge in a formation designed to reduce wind resistance and maximise efficiency. The achievement was recognised by Guinness World Records with the titles 'Fastest marathon distance (male)' and 'First marathon distance run under two hours'.

=== 2020 ===
Kipchoge placed 8th in the 2020 London Marathon in October with a time of 2:06:49, the lowest finish of his marathoning career so far. The race was won by Ehtopias'S Shura Itata in a time of 2:05:41. Kipchoge lost contact with the lead runner with 3 miles to go. For the first time, the run was on a 19 laps looped course and originally set for April and postponed to October due to the COVID-19 pandemic.

=== 2021 ===
In preparation for the delayed 2020 Tokyo Olympic Games, he won the NN Mission Marathon, which was held at Enschede Airport Twente in the Netherlands on 18 April 2021 in a time of 2:04:30. Jonathan Korir finished as the runner up with a personal best of 2:06:40.

Kipchoge successfully defended his title from the Rio Olympics by winning the gold medal in the men's marathon at the Tokyo Games in a time of 2:08:38, becoming only the third person to successfully defend their gold medal in the men's marathon, after Abebe Bikila in 1960 and 1964, and Waldemar Cierpinski in 1976 and 1980. He was the favourite to win and attacked around the 30 km mark, looking back only once afterwards. He won by 80 seconds, the largest margin in 49 years. The silver medal went to Abdi Nageeye (Netherlands), while Bashir Abdi (Belgium) came in third for a bronze medal with 2:10:00. Kipchoge was the oldest Olympic marathon winner since Carlos Lopes won in 1984 at the age of 37. The run was staged 500 miles north of Tokyo in Sapporo, with 106 runners participating. A documentary on the Ineos 1:59 Challenge, titled Kipchoge: The Last Milestone, was released digitally on-demand on 24 August 2021.

=== 2022 ===
On 20 January, Kipchoge announced his desire to win all six World Marathon Majors (he had already won three, the London, Berlin, and Chicago marathons, by that time). This was followed up by an announcement on 18 February that he would be participating in the 2021 Tokyo Marathon (which took place on 6 March 2022 due to COVID-19 restrictions in 2021) and that the majority of his recent training has been dedicated towards this goal. He won the Tokyo Marathon with a time of 2:02:40 – a course and all-comers' record. Amos Kipruto of Kenya finished second with a personal best of 2:03:13, and Tamirat Tola from Ethiopia came in third in a time of 2:04:14.

==== 2022 Berlin and second world marathon record ====
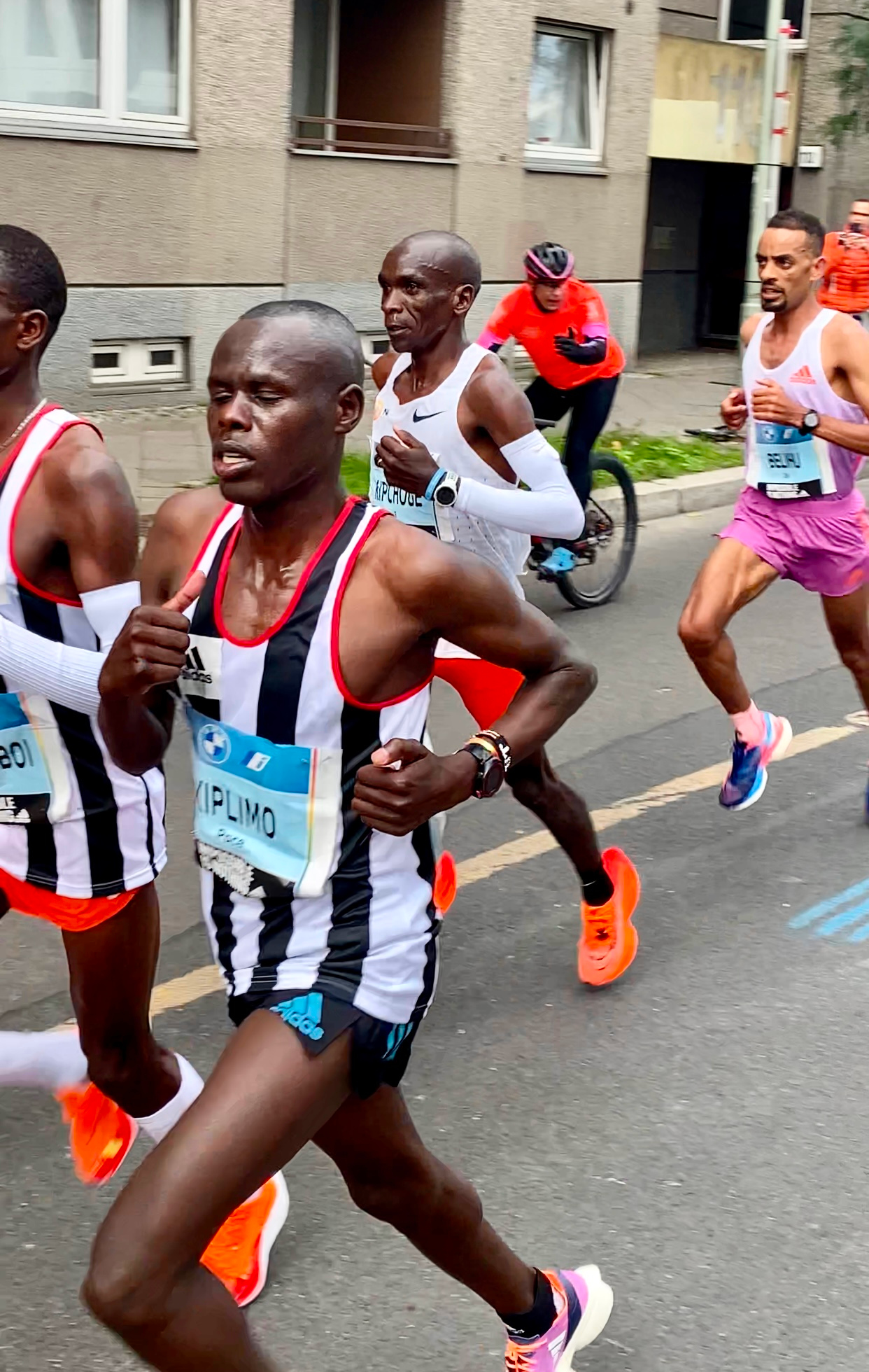
Kipchoge (back center) about 14.5 km (9.0 mi) into the race, behind pacemakers (in striped gear).

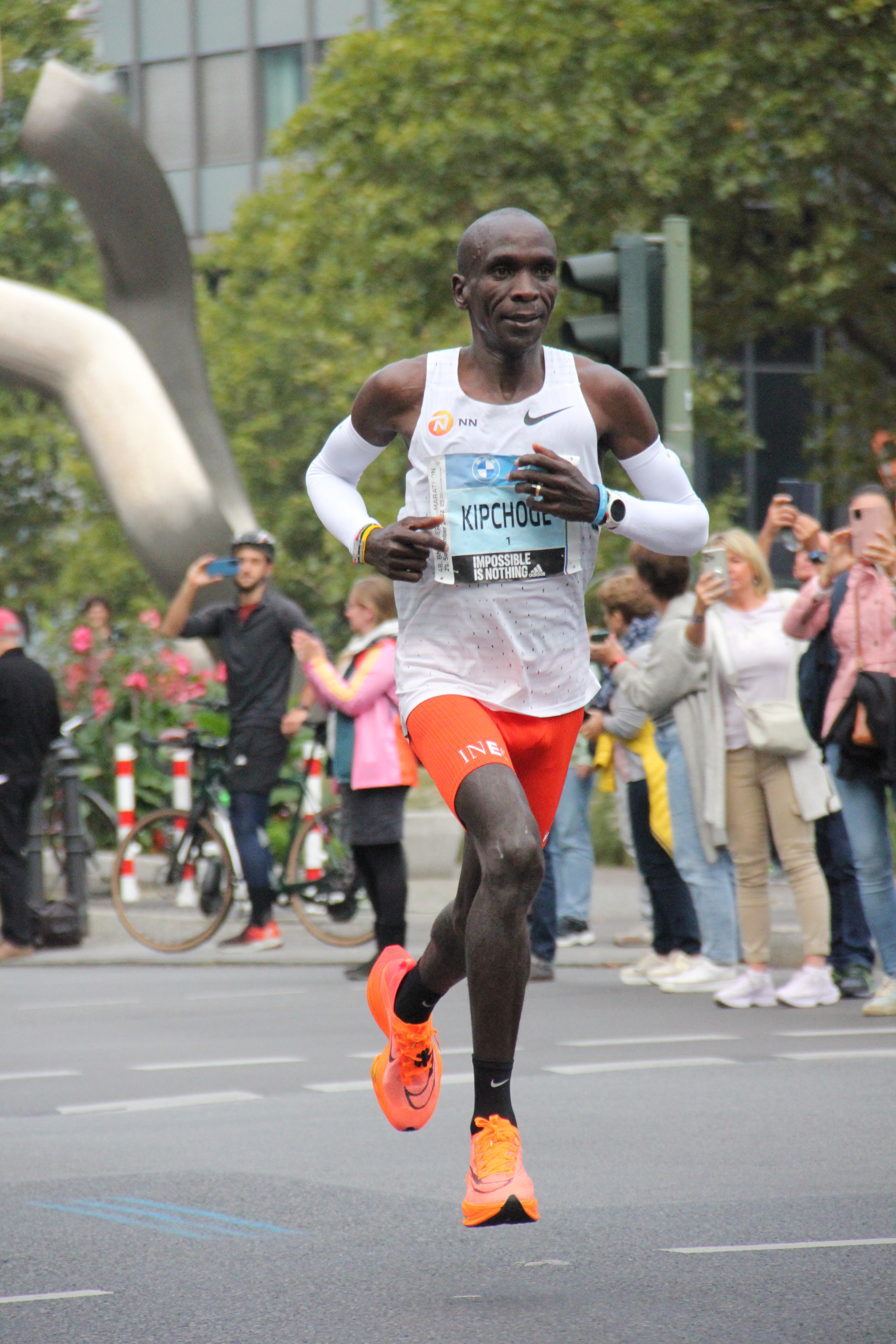
Eliud at the 2022 Berlin Marathon.

On 25 September, Kipchoge won the Berlin Marathon decisively in a time of 2:01:09, beating by 30 seconds his own previous world record, which he set on the same course in 2018. With his fourth victory in Berlin, he equaled the record achievement of Haile Gebrselassie. He finished 4:49 min ahead of second-placed compatriot Mark Korir while Ethiopia's Tadu Abate took third place with a time of 2:06:28. Kipchoge achieved halfway in 59:51, which, being at the time, the fastest split in marathon history, would have been a world record in the standalone half-marathon in 1993, and was only 26 seconds off his best in that distance. He slowed down later with the second half in 61:18. It was the eighth time in a row that the men's record was set in Berlin and the 12th record there overall.

Split times Marathon world record / Breaking2 / INEOS 1:59 Challenge
	Former World Record Berlin, 25 September 2022		Breaking2 Monza, 6 May 2017		INEOS 1:59 Challenge Vienna, 12 October 2019		
Distance	Split	Time	Split	Time	Split	Time	Notes
5 km	14:14	14:14	14:14	14:14	14:10	14:10	
10 km	14:09	28:23	14:07	28:21	14:10	28:20	
15 km	14:10	42:33	14:13	42:34	14:14	42:34	
20 km	14:12	56:45	14:15	56:49	14:13	56:47	
Half	(3:06)	59:51	(3:08)	59:57	(3:07)	59:54	
25 km	14:23	1:11:08	14:14	1:11:03	14:12	1:10:59	(WBP 1:11:18, Dennis Kipruto Kimetto)
30 km	14:32	1:25:40	14:17	1:25:20	14:12	1:25:11	(WBP 1:27:13, Eliud Kipchoge/Stanley Biwott)
35 km	14:30	1:40:10	14:17	1:39:37	14:12	1:39:23	(BP 1:41:47, Dennis Kipruto Kimetto)
40 km	14:43	1:54:53	14:27	1:54:04	14:13	1:53:36	(BP 1:56:29, Dennis Kipruto Kimetto)
Marathon	(6:16)	2:01:09	(6:21)	2:00:25	(6:04)	1:59:40	(WR 2:01:39, Eliud Kipchoge)

=== 2023–present ===
At the 2023 Boston Marathon, Kipchoge aimed to win his fifth of the six major marathons. However, after missing his water bottle and due to a left leg problem, the 38-year-old was unable to stay with the lead group on a hilly section after the 30 km mark. He suffered the third defeat of his marathon career, finishing sixth with a time of 2:09:23. Evans Chebet was the winner in 2:05:54, successfully defending his title.

At the 2023 Berlin Marathon, his first race since the Boston defeat, Kipchoge won the race for a record fifth time, finishing at 2:02:42. He ran alone from 32 km (20 mi) onward after Ethiopia's Derseh Kindie dropped away, but fell short of breaking his own world record that he had set the previous year. With the victory, Kipchoge became the first man in history to win the Berlin Marathon five times, having already won in 2015, 2017, 2018, and 2022. Fellow Kenyan Vincent Kipkemoi came in third place in a time of 2:03:13. The half marathon split time was 1:00:22.

Kipchoge failed to finish the marathon for the first time in his career when defending his gold medal at the 2024 Paris Olympics, dropping out of the race after around 30 km (19 mi), citing discomfort around his waist. He later told reporters that he would not compete at another Olympic Games. When asked about the prospects of competing in Los Angeles in 2028: he explained:

"You will see me in a different way, maybe giving people motivation, but I will not run. I need to go back, sit down, try to figure my 21 years of running at high level. I need to evolve and feature in other things."

The Marathons winner was Tamirat Tola (Ethiopia) in a time of 2:06:26, an Olympic record; silver went to Bashir Abdi (Belgium) 2:06:47; and bronze to Benson Kipruto (Kenya) in 2:07:00. Kipchoge's longtime rival Kenenisa Bekele finished 2:12:24 placed 39 among 71 finishers with 10 runners not finishing. Despite the performance, Kenyan President William Ruto still recognised Kipchoge's achievements:

"I know how people were disappointed. Many people I know made a lot of comments, 'How could Eliud not finish?' But Eliud we celebrate you. You have held our flag high."

Kipchoge competed in the 2025 New York City Marathon, finishing 17th, thus completing all six World Marathon Major courses. After finishing, Kipchoge announced a new project known as Eliud's Running World, where he will run seven marathons across seven continents over a period of two years to raise awareness about sustainability and education. This would also be in an effort to raise money to build libraries in Kenya.

On 11th October 2026, Kipchoge ran the Melbourne Marathon as the third race in his Eliud's Running World project. He won the race, finishing in a time of 2:09:10 and setting a new course record in the process.

=== International ===
Representing Kenya
Year	Competition	Venue	Position	Event	Notes
2002	World Cross Country Championships	Dublin, Ireland	5th	Junior race	23:39
2002	World Cross Country Championships	Dublin, Ireland	1st	Junior team	18 pts
2003	World Cross Country Championships	Lausanne, Switzerland	1st	Junior race	22:47
2003	World Cross Country Championships	Lausanne, Switzerland	1st	Junior team	15 pts
2003	World Championships	Paris, France	1st	5000 m	12:52.79 CR
2004	World Cross Country Championships	Brussels, Belgium	4th	Long race	36:34
2004	World Cross Country Championships	Brussels, Belgium	2nd	Team	30 pts
2004	Olympic Games	Athens, Greece	3rd	5000 m	13:15.10
2005	World Cross Country Championships	Saint-Étienne, France	5th	Long race	35:37
2005	World Cross Country Championships	Saint-Étienne, France	2nd	Team	35 pts
2005	World Championships	Helsinki, Finland	4th	5000 m	13:33.04
2006	World Indoor Championships	Moscow, Russia	3rd	3000 m	7:42.58
2007	World Championships	Osaka, Japan	2nd	5000 m	13:46.00
2008	Olympic Games	Beijing, China	2nd	5000 m	13:02.80
2009	World Championships	Berlin, Germany	5th	5000 m	13:18.95
2010	Commonwealth Games	New Delhi, India	2nd	5000 m	13:31.32
2011	World Championships	Daegu, South Korea	7th	5000 m	13:27.27
2012	World Half Marathon Championships	Kavarna, Bulgaria	6th	Half marathon	1:01:52
2016	Olympic Games	Rio de Janeiro, Brazil	1st	Marathon	2:08:44
2021	Olympic Games	Sapporo, Japan	1st	Marathon	2:08:38
2024	Olympic Games	Paris, France	DNF	Marathon	—

=== Marathons ===
Competition	Rank	Time	Location	Date	Notes
2013 Hamburg Marathon	1st	2:05:30	Hamburg	2013 Apr 21	Marathon debut, set course record.
2013 Berlin Marathon	2nd	2:04:05	Berlin	2013 Sep 29	1st Wilson Kipsang (2:03:23 World Record)
2014 Rotterdam Marathon	1st	2:05:00	Rotterdam	2014 Apr 13	
2014 Chicago Marathon	1st	2:04:11	Chicago, IL	2014 Oct 12	
2015 London Marathon	1st	2:04:42	London	2015 Apr 26	
2015 Berlin Marathon	1st	2:04:00	Berlin	2015 Sep 27	
2016 London Marathon	1st	2:03:05	London	2016 Apr 24	Set course record.
2016 Summer Olympics	1st	2:08:44	Rio de Janeiro	2016 Aug 21	
2017 Breaking2		2:00:25	Monza	2017 May 6	An experimental run over the marathon distance. (Note: Not eligible for record purposes. Kipchoge was the fastest runner out of three.)
2017 Berlin Marathon	1st	2:03:32	Berlin	2017 Sep 24	
2018 London Marathon	1st	2:04:17	London	2018 Apr 22	
2018 Berlin Marathon	1st	2:01:39	Berlin	2018 Sep 16	World record & became 1st man ran under 2:02
2019 London Marathon	1st	2:02:37	London	2019 Apr 28	New course record.
2019 INEOS 1:59 Challenge		1:59:40	Vienna	2019 Oct 12	An experimental run over the marathon distance. (Note: Not eligible for record purposes.)
2020 London Marathon	8th	2:06:49	London	2020 Oct 4	First loss in marathon since 2013.
NN Mission Marathon	1st	2:04:30	Enschede	2021 Apr 18	
2020 Summer Olympics	1st	2:08:38	Sapporo	2021 Aug 8	Becomes third man to defend Olympic marathon title, after Abebe Bikila and Waldemar Cierpinski. Largest margin of victory (80 seconds) in Olympics since 1972.
2021 Tokyo Marathon	1st	2:02:40	Tokyo	2022 Mar 6	Race record.
2022 Berlin Marathon	1st	2:01:09	Berlin	2022 Sep 25	World record.
2023 Boston Marathon	6th	2:09:23	Boston, MA	2023 Apr 17	Third loss in marathon. Slowest marathon time of career back then.
2023 Berlin Marathon	1st	2:02:42	Berlin	2023 Sep 24	First man in history to win the Berlin Marathon 5 times.
2024 Tokyo Marathon	10th	2:06:50	Tokyo	2024 Mar 2	Fourth loss in marathon & lowest finishing place in career back then.
2024 Summer Olympics	DNF	—	Paris	2024 Aug 10	First time in career that he dropped out of a marathon.
2025 London Marathon	6th	2:05:25	London	2025 April 27	Fifth loss in marathon.
2025 Sydney Marathon	9th	2:08:31	Sydney	2025 August 31	Sixth loss in marathon.
2025 New York Marathon	17th	2:14:36	New York	2025 November 2	Last marathon as competitive elite runner & won the Six Star Medal
2026 Melbourne Marathon	1st	2:09:10	Melbourne, Australia	2026 October 11	First marathon victory in 3 years. Broke course record for event by 2 seconds.

World Marathon Majors results timeline
World Marathon Majors	2013	2014	2015	2016	2017	2018	2019	2020	2021	2022	2023	2024	2025
Tokyo Marathon	–	–	–	–	–	–	–	–	p	1st 2:02:40 *	–	10th 2:06:50	–
Boston Marathon	–	–	–	–	–	–	–	x	–	–	6th 2:09:23	–	–
London Marathon	–	–	1st 2:04:42	1st 2:03:05	–	1st 2:04:17	1st 2:02:37	8th 2:06:49	–	–	–	–	6th 2:05:25
Berlin Marathon	2nd 2:04:05	–	1st 2:04:00	–	1st 2:03:32	1st 2:01:39	–	x	–	1st 2:01:09	1st 2:02:42	–	–
Chicago Marathon	–	1st 2:04:11	–	–	–	–	–	x	–	–	–	–	–
New York City Marathon	–	–	–	–	–	–	–	x	–	–	–	–	17th 2:14:36
Sydney Marathon	Not part of WMM												9th 2:08:31

(*) Officially billed as the 2021 Tokyo Marathon, the race took place on 6 March 2022 after the 2021 edition was postponed because of the COVID-19 pandemic. As a consequence of this postponement, the 2022 Tokyo Marathon was cancelled.

(x) Cancelled due to the COVID-19 pandemic.

(p) Postponed due to the COVID-19 pandemic.

=== National titles ===
- Kenyan Cross Country Championships
  - Senior race: 2004, 2005
  - Junior race: 2002, 2003
- Kenyan Junior Championships
  - 5000 m: 2002
- Kenyan Olympic Trials
  - 5000 m: 2004

=== Circuit wins ===
1500 m

- FBK Games: 2004

3000 m

- Qatar Athletic Super Grand Prix: 2004, 2005, 2007, 2009
- Memorial Van Damme: 2004
- British Grand Prix: 2006
- BW-Bank-Meeting: 2006
- Sparkassen Cup: 2006, 2010

Two miles

- Prefontaine Classic: 2005
- Birmingham Indoor Grand Prix: 2012

5000 m

- Notturna di Milano: 2003, 2009
- DN Galan: 2003
- Golden Gala: 2004
- Memorial Van Damme: 2005, 2008
- Ostrava Golden Spike: 2008
- Qatar Athletic Super Grand Prix: 2010

5K run

- Carlsbad 5000: 2010

4 miles

- 4 Mile of Groningen: 2005, 2006, 2007

10K run

- San Silvestre Vallecana: 2005, 2006
- Great Yorkshire Run: 2009

Half marathon

- Barcelona Half Marathon: 2013, 2014
- Kärnten Läuft: 2013
- Delhi Half Marathon: 2016

Cross country

- Trofeo Alasport: 2004
- Great Edinburgh International Cross Country: 2005, 2011
- Campaccio: 2009

== Personal bests ==
All information taken from World Athletics profile.

Outdoor
Distance	Time	Date	Location	Venue	Notes
1500 m	3:33.20	31 May 2004	Hengelo, Netherlands	FBK Games	
Mile run	3:50.40	30 July 2004	London, United Kingdom	London Grand Prix	
3000 m	7:27.66	6 May 2011	Doha, Qatar	Qatar Athletic Super Grand Prix	
Two miles	8:07.68	4 June 2005	Eugene, United States	Prefontaine Classic	
5000 m	12:46.53	2 July 2004	Rome, Italy	Golden Gala	
10,000 m	26:49.02	26 May 2007	Hengelo, Netherlands	FBK Games	
10 km (road race)	28:11	27 September 2009	Utrecht, Netherlands	Singelloop Utrecht	
10 km (road race)	26:54	31 December 2006	Madrid, Spain	San Silvestre Vallecana	(not legal (Note: Set on a downhill course.))
Half marathon	59:25	1 September 2012	Lille, France	Lille Half Marathon	
30 km	1:27:13	24 April 2016	London, United Kingdom	London Marathon	World best
Marathon	2:01:09	25 September 2022	Berlin, Germany	Berlin Marathon	
Marathon	1:59:40	12 October 2019	Vienna, Austria	Ineos 1:59 Challenge	(not legal)

Indoor
Distance	Time (min)	Date	Location	Venue
1500 m	3:36.25	18 February 2006	Birmingham, United Kingdom	National Indoor Arena
3000 m	7:29.37	5 February 2011	Stuttgart, Germany	Hanns-Martin-Schleyer-Halle
Two miles	8:07.39	18 February 2012	Birmingham, United Kingdom	National Indoor Arena
5000 m	12:55.72	11 February 2011	Düsseldorf, Germany	Arena-Sportpark (in German)

== Awards ==
- AIMS Best Marathon Runner Award – Men: 2015, 2016, 2017
- 2018 United Nations Kenya Person of the Year.
- 2018, 2019 IAAF Male athlete of the year award.
- 2019 BBC World Sport Star of the Year.
- Kipchoge was cited as one of the Top 100 most influential Africans by New African magazine in 2019.
- 2021 Association of National Olympic Committees Best Male Athlete Tokyo 2020 Olympics.
- 2021 Abebe Bikila Award.
- 2023 Princess of Asturias Award.
- 2023 Honorary Doctorate from Jomo Kenyatta University of Agriculture and Technology

== See also ==
- List of Olympic medalists in athletics (men)
- List of World Championships in Athletics medalists (men)
- List of Commonwealth Games medallists in athletics (men)
- List of winners of the Chicago Marathon
- List of winners of the London Marathon
- List of winners of the Rotterdam Marathon
- List of 2004 Summer Olympics medal winners
- List of 2008 Summer Olympics medal winners
- List of 2016 Summer Olympics medal winners
- List of African Olympic medalists
- List of middle-distance runners
- 5000 metres at the Olympics
- Kenya at the World Championships in Athletics

== Notes ==
Records
Preceded by Hicham El Guerrouj; Edwin Soi	Men's 3000 m best year performance 2004–2005; 2009	Succeeded by Isaac Kiprono Songok; Tariku Bekele
Preceded by (Kenya) Dennis Kipruto Kimetto	Men's marathon world record holder 16 September 2018 – 8 October 2023	Succeeded by (Kenya) Kelvin Kiptum
Awards
Preceded by (Qatar) Mutaz Essa Barshim	Men's Track & Field News Athlete of the Year; 2018	Succeeded by (Norway) Karsten Warholm
Preceded by (Italy) Francesco Molinari	BBC World Sport Star of the Year; 2019	Succeeded by (Russia) Khabib Nurmagomedov
