= Guye Adola =

Ethiopian long-distance runner

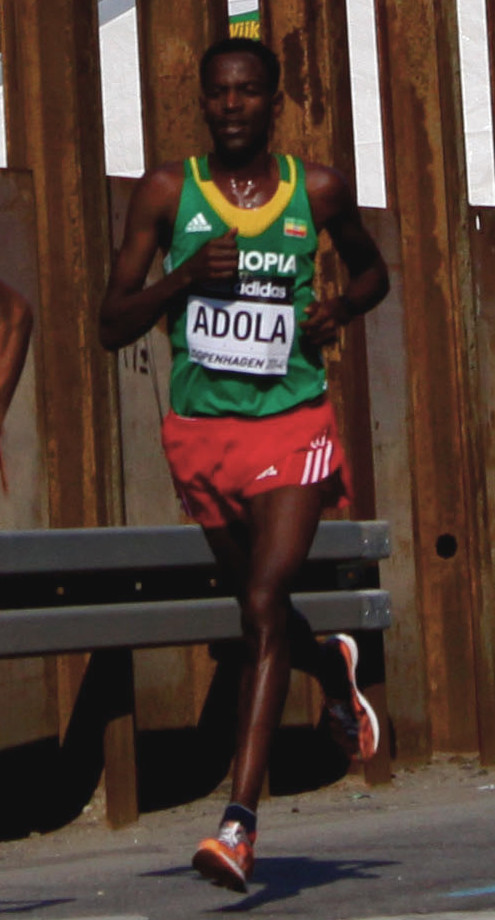
- Adola during the 2014 World Half Marathon Championships

Personal information
- Born: October 20, 1990 (age 36) Adola, Oromiya Region
- Height: 175 cm (5 ft 9 in)
- Weight: 54 kg (119 lb)

Sport
- Country: Ethiopia
- Sport: Track and field
- Events: Half Marathon, Marathon
- Coached by: Gemedu Dedefo

Achievements and titles
- Personal bests: 10,000 meters: 27:09.78; Half Marathon: 59:06; Marathon: 2:02:50
Medal record
Men's athletics
Representing Ethiopia
IAAF World Half Marathon Championships
Bronze medal – third place	2014 Copenhagen	Half marathon
Bronze medal – third place	2014 Copenhagen	Team
World Marathon Majors
Silver medal – second place	2017 Berlin	Marathon
Gold medal – first place	2021 Berlin	Marathon
Gold medal – first place	2026 Berlin	Marathon

Berlin Marathon 2026

Guye Adola Idemo (born 20 October 1990) is an Ethiopian long-distance runner who specialises in the half marathon.

== Biography ==
Born in Adola in Ethiopia's Oromiya Region, he began training with Gianni Demadonna's group and came to prominence in 2014. His first high level race was the Marrakech Half Marathon in January that year, which he won in a best of 61:26 minutes. He then placed fourth at the Ethiopian half marathon championships.

His international debut shortly followed and he was Ethiopia's best performer at the 2014 IAAF World Half Marathon Championships, taking the individual bronze medal in a personal best of 59:21 minutes to lead the Ethiopian men to third in the team competition. Following his first major medals, he ran on the circuit and took third at the Giro Media Blenio in Switzerland and the Luanda Half Marathon in Angola. He won the 2014 Delhi Half Marathon in New Delhi with his personal best of 59:06.

In his marathon debut in the 2017 Berlin Marathon he challenged Eliud Kipchoge and came second with a finishing time of 2:03:46, the fastest marathon-debut ever at that time.

In 2020, he competed in the men's race at the 2020 World Athletics Half Marathon Championships held in Gdynia, Poland.

In 2021, he won the men's race at the 2021 Berlin Marathon.

In 2026, he won the men's race at the 2026 Rotterdam Marathon in 2:03:54, and the men's race at the 2026 Berlin Marathon in 2:02:50, a personal best.
