= 2026 London Marathon =

46th annual marathon race in London

46th London Marathon
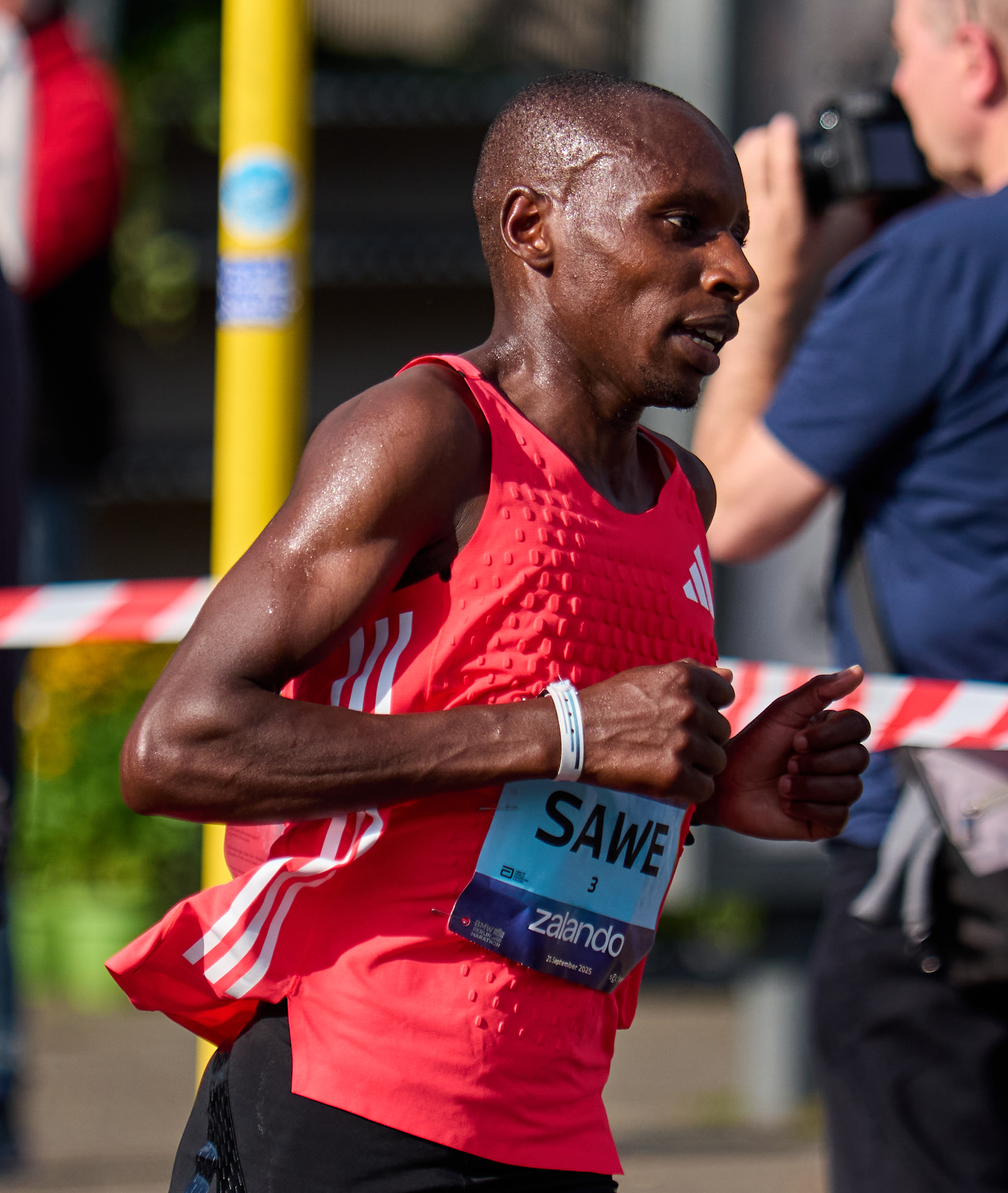
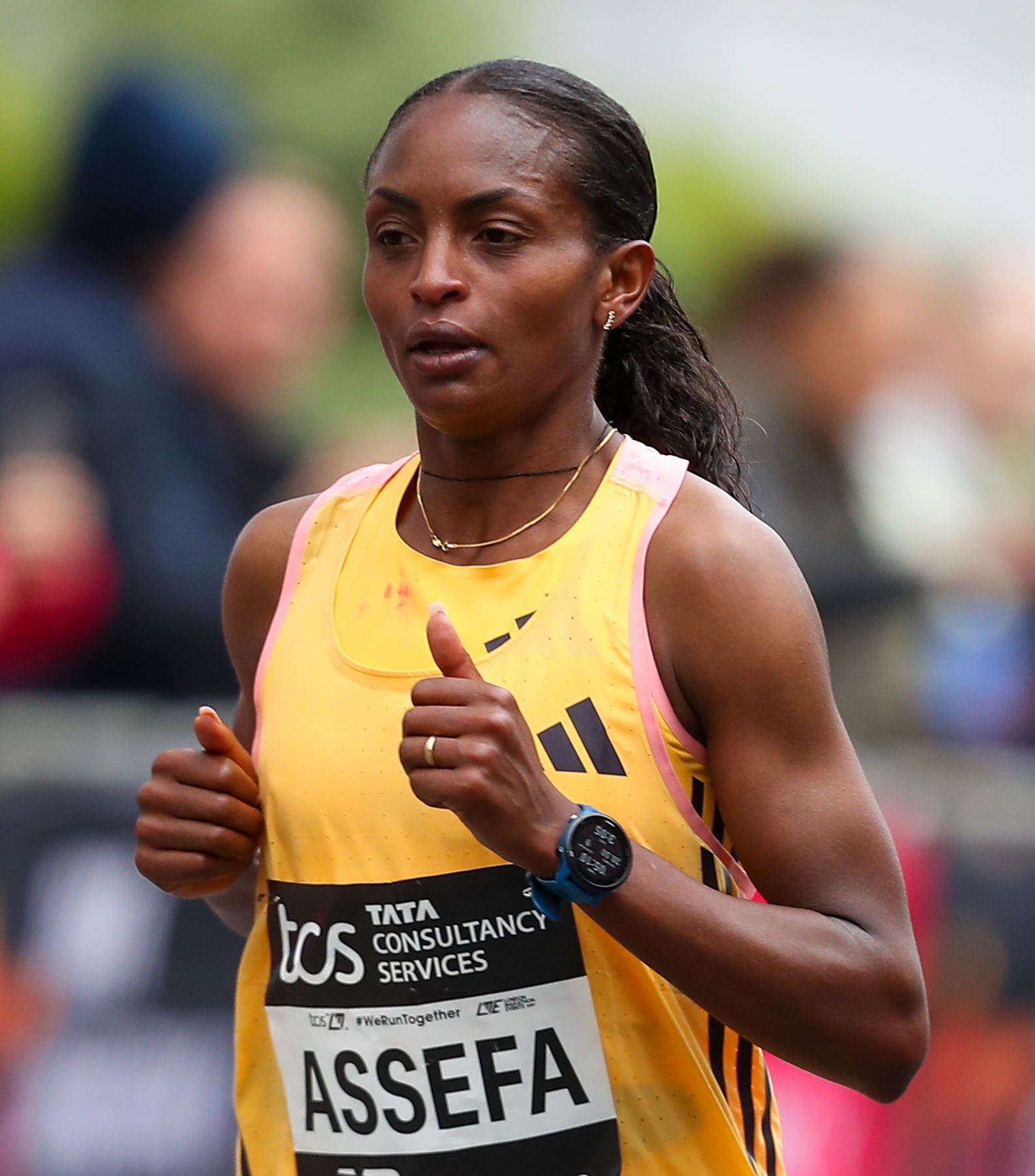
- Sabastian Sawe and Tigst Assefa, the men's and women's winners
- Venue: London, England
- Date: 26 April 2026

Champions
- Men: Sabastian Sawe (1:59:30)
- Women: Tigst Assefa (2:15:41)
- Wheelchair men: Marcel Hug (1:24:13)
- Wheelchair women: Catherine Debrunner (1:38:29)

The 46th London Marathon took place on 26 April 2026. The race was the third of seven World Major Marathon events and was a platinum label race. The route featured three separate starting points — one by Greenwich Park and two on Blackheath common — and ended on The Mall. Notable landmarks en route included Cutty Sark, Tower Bridge, Canary Wharf and Buckingham Palace. The race was historic for several reasons: it was the first marathon completed in under two hours, with Sabastian Sawe achieving a time of 1:59:30. The elite men's runner-up, Yomif Kejelcha, also finished the race in under two hours (1:59:41), recording the fastest non-winning marathon time and the fastest marathon debut in history. Third-place finisher Jacob Kiplimo also finished under the previous world record. In the women's elite field, Tigst Assefa set a new world record for a women-only marathon. Additionally, many national records were set for both men and women, such as Peter Lynch's 2:06:08 for Ireland, and Julia Paternain's 2:25:47 for Uruguay.

== Planning ==
The women's race was originally announced to include Olympic champion Sifan Hassan and world marathon champion Peres Jepchirchir, but both runners withdrew due to injury, leaving Tigst Assefa, Joyceline Jepkosgei, and Hellen Obiri as the headliners. Tigst said in the pre-race press conference that she was fitter than she was last year, when she won the race and set a 2:15:50 women's-only world record.

In the men's race, the debut of Yomif Kejelcha was highly anticipated as the Ethiopian was coming off both a successful track career and several fast half marathon performances. Sabastian Sawe, the defending champion, was viewed as trustworthy given that he had voluntarily subjected himself to increased drug testing paid for by his sponsor Adidas in the lead-up to the race. However, he revealed during the pre-race press conference that he had been dealing with a back injury before the race. 5,000 m and 10,000 m world record holder Joshua Cheptegei was also entered in the race, but he had struggled in his three career marathons before London.

The event received 1,133,813 ballots for entry. It was a new world record for entrants to a marathon, surpassing the 840,318 applications from the 2025 London Marathon.

== Elite races ==
=== Men ===
By five kilometres into the men's race, a group of six runners had separated from the rest of the pack. Sawe, the defending champion, was joined by Paris Olympic champion Tamirat Tola, world cross country champion Jacob Kiplimo, marathon debutant Yomif Kejelcha, Deresa Geleta, and Amos Kipruto. They were led by a group of pacers through the half marathon in one hour and 29 seconds, aligned with the 60:30 target pace.

The pacers were able to block the wind until after 25 kilometres (16 mi), at which point Sawe sped up (contrary to expectations that runners would run faster when behind a pacesetter). 29 kilometres (18 mi) into the race, only Sawe and Kejelcha remained in the lead with Kiplimo trailing. At 30 kilometres (19 mi), the pair was still only at a projected 2:01 finish, but Sawe split a 13:54 5K run from 30 to 35K to bring the pace down to 2:00:29. Sawe's 24th mile time of 4:12 was the fastest individual mile split recorded in any marathon, but Kejelcha remained in contact with the lead. On 1 May, an analysis showed that the 4:12 24th-mile split for Sawe was likely inaccurately measured, and London's official timing company mika:timing removed the split from their data.

Kejelcha was finally dropped after the 25th mile, leaving Sawe by himself as he ran the stretch from 40 km to 42.195 km in 5 minutes and 51 seconds. Both Sawe and Kejelcha broke the two-hour marathon barrier, while Kiplimo broke the previous world record time of 2:00:35 in 3rd place. All of the top five runners ran a personal record time over the marathon distance.

=== Women ===
In the women's race, former marathon world record holder and defending champion Tigst Assefa broke away from the elite field early along with Hellen Obiri, Joyciline Jepkosgei, and Catherine Reline Amanang'ole. Obiri was primarily known for her performances on slower marathon courses like the Boston Marathon and New York City Marathon and was debuting on the London course, while Jepkosgei was the 2021 London Marathon winner.

By 15 kilometres (9.3 mi), only Tigst, Obiri, and Jepkosgei remained. They ran the half marathon in 1:06:12, half a minute faster than Tigst's split the previous year and only two minutes slower than the 1:04:16 split run during Ruth Chepngetich's 2:09:56 mixed-gender world record run.

The trio slowed in the following miles, running every 5 km split after 20 km in over 16 minutes. Nonetheless, Tigst maintained the pace enough to break her own women's-only world record by nine seconds, finishing in 2:15:41. Obiri and Jepkosgei also ran under 2 hours and 16 minutes, marking the first time that three women had broken the 2:16 barrier in the same race.

== Reception ==
A total of 59,830 runners finished the race, setting a new Guinness World Record for the largest marathon and beating the 2025 New York City Marathon's 59,226 finishers. Though not yet officially announced, the 2027 London Marathon had been rumoured to be the first World Marathon Major to separate into two races held over two days to accommodate larger crowd sizes. An estimated 800,000 spectators attended the race live in London.

== Participant data ==
The 2026 London Marathon finishers had a gender split of 59.7% men and 40.1% women. Among the general participants the average finish time was 4:36:28, the fastest age group being those aged 40-44. 68% of finishers were from the United Kingdom. 88 year old Harry Newton was the oldest participant, with a total of 37 people over the age of 80 entered in the race.

== Results ==
Sawe set a world record in the men's marathon, and Tigst set a world record for a women-only marathon.

=== Elite runners ===
Elite men's top 10 finishers
| Position | Athlete | Nationality | Time |
|---|---|---|---|
| 1st place, gold medalist(s) | Sabastian Sawe | Kenya | 1:59:30 WR |
| 2nd place, silver medalist(s) | Yomif Kejelcha | Ethiopia | 1:59:41 NR |
| 3rd place, bronze medalist(s) | Jacob Kiplimo | Uganda | 2:00:28 NR |
| 4 | Amos Kipruto | Kenya | 2:01:39 |
| 5 | Tamirat Tola | Ethiopia | 2:02:59 |
| 6 | Deresa Geleta | Ethiopia | 2:03:23 |
| 7 | Addisu Gobena | Ethiopia | 2:05:23 |
| 8 | Geoffrey Kamworor | Kenya | 2:05:38 |
| 9 | Peter Lynch | Ireland | 2:06:08 NR |
| 10 | Mahamed Mahamed | Great Britain | 2:06:14 |

Elite women's top 10 finishers
| Position | Athlete | Nationality | Time |
|---|---|---|---|
| 1st place, gold medalist(s) | Tigst Assefa | Ethiopia | 2:15:41 WoWR |
| 2nd place, silver medalist(s) | Hellen Obiri | Kenya | 2:15:53 |
| 3rd place, bronze medalist(s) | Joyciline Jepkosgei | Kenya | 2:15:55 |
| 4 | Degitu Azimeraw | Ethiopia | 2:19:13 |
| 5 | Catherine Amanang'ole | Kenya | 2:21:20 |
| 6 | Eunice Chebichii Chumba | Bahrain | 2:23:44 |
| 7 | Eilish McColgan | Great Britain | 2:24:51 |
| 8 | Julia Paternain | Uruguay | 2:25:47 NR |
| 9 | Rose Harvey | Great Britain | 2:26:14 |
| 10 | Marta Galimany | Spain | 2:27:38 |

=== Elite wheelchair ===
Elite Wheelchair men's top 10 finishers
| Position | Athlete | Nationality | Time |
|---|---|---|---|
| 1st place, gold medalist(s) | Marcel Hug | Switzerland | 1:24:13 |
| 2nd place, silver medalist(s) | Luo Xingchuan | China | 1:28:46 |
| 3rd place, bronze medalist(s) | David Weir | Great Britain | 1:29:23 |
| 4 | Tomoki Suzuki | Japan | 1:30:05 |
| 5 | Jetze Plat | Netherlands | 1:31:04 |
| 6 | Sho Watanabe | Japan | 1:31:42 |
| 7 | Hiroki Kishizawa | Japan | 1:31:43 |
| 8 | Evan Correll | United States | 1:32:03 |
| 9 | Geert Schipper | Netherlands | 1:33:53 |
| 10 | Ludwig Malter | Austria | 1:33:54 |

Elite Wheelchair women's top 10 finishers
| Position | Athlete | Nationality | Time |
|---|---|---|---|
| 1st place, gold medalist(s) | Catherine Debrunner | Switzerland | 1:38:29 |
| 2nd place, silver medalist(s) | Tatyana McFadden | United States | 1:38:34 |
| 3rd place, bronze medalist(s) | Manuela Schär | Switzerland | 1:41:21 |
| 4 | Yajuan Tian | China | 1:46:59 |
| 5 | Zhaoqian Zhou | China | 1:46:59 |
| 6 | Tsubasa Nakamine | Japan | 1:47:01 |
| 7 | Madison de Rozario | Australia | 1:47:01 |
| 8 | Vanessa Cristina de Souza | Brazil | 1:47:01 |
| 9 | Patricia Eachus | Switzerland | 1:48:00 |
| 10 | Christie Dawes | Australia | 1:48:38 |

== Charity ==
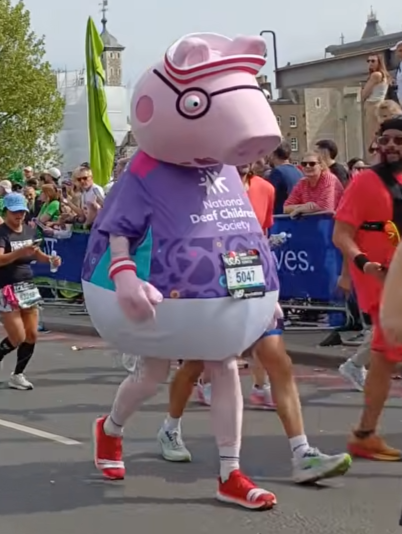
Daddy Pig running to raise money for the National Deaf Children's Society

The 2026 London Marathon featured several runners dressed in costumes, running for charitable causes, while others were raising awareness of illnesses. Patrick Barkham finished the race in a badger costume to raise funds for wildlife conservation and in memory of his late father. Fiona Betts finished the race in a helicopter costume in support of air ambulance services. Jonathan Acott, a cancer survivor, attempted to break a world record while dressed as a knight in armour, while raising funds for his charity. Other participants dressed up in costumes such as a polar bear, a two-person elephant and a giant testicle costume.

A costumed Daddy Pig from Peppa Pig ran the marathon to raise money for the National Deaf Children's Society. He was coached by, and ran alongside, Joe Wicks. YouTuber Dawko ran the marathon while dressed as the character Freddy Fazbear from Five Nights at Freddy's to raise money for the Samaritans.
