= 2015 IAAF World Cross Country Championships – Senior men's race =

Senior men's race at the 2015 IAAF World Cross Country Championships
- Organisers: IAAF
- Edition: 41st
- Date: March 28
- Host city: Guiyang, China
- Venue: Guiyang horse racing circuit
- Events: 1
- Distances: 12 km – Senior men
- Participation: 110 athletes from 37 nations

The Senior men's race at the 2015 IAAF World Cross Country Championships was held at the Guiyang horse racing circuit in Guiyang, China, on March 28, 2015. Reports of the event were given for the IAAF.

Complete results for individuals, and for teams were published.

== Race results ==
=== Senior men's race (12 km) ===
==== Individual ====
Rank	Athlete	Country	Time
1st place, gold medalist(s)	Geoffrey Kipsang Kamworor	Kenya	34:52
2nd place, silver medalist(s)	Bedan Karoki Muchiri	Kenya	35:00
3rd place, bronze medalist(s)	Muktar Edris	Ethiopia	35:06
4	Hagos Gebrhiwet	Ethiopia	35:15
5	Leonard Barsoton	Kenya	35:24
6	Tamirat Tola	Ethiopia	35:33
7	Atsedu Tsegay	Ethiopia	35:47
8	Moses Kibet	Uganda	35:53
9	Ismail Juma	Tanzania	35:55
10	Aweke Ayalew	Bahrain	35:56
11	Albert Kibichii Rop	Bahrain	35:59
12	Phillip Kiprono Langat	Kenya	36:05
13	Abrar Osman	Eritrea	36:13
14	Bonsa Dida	Ethiopia	36:17
15	El Hassan Elabbassi	Bahrain	36:22
16	Moses Letoyie	Kenya	36:23
17	Teklemariam Medhin	Eritrea	36:24
18	Isaac Korir	Bahrain	36:27
19	Zelalem Bacha	Bahrain	36:30
20	Hassan Chani	Bahrain	36:35
21	Joseph Kiprono Kiptum	Kenya	36:37
22	Polat Kemboi Arıkan	Turkey	36:40
23	Goitom Kifle	Eritrea	36:44
24	Chris Derrick	United States	36:45
25	Phillip Kipyeko	Uganda	36:50
26	Tesfaye Abera	Ethiopia	36:59
27	Timothy Toroitich	Uganda	37:02
28	Brett Robinson	Australia	37:11
29	Stephen Mokoka	South Africa	37:14
30	Pontien Ntawuyirushintege	Rwanda	37:16
31	Rabah Aboud	Algeria	37:20
32	Geofrey Kusuro	Uganda	37:20
33	Fabiano Nelson Sulle	Tanzania	37:26
34	Ryan Vail	United States	37:27
35	Félicien Muhitira	Rwanda	37:28
36	Patrick Smyth	United States	37:31
37	Robert Curtis	United States	37:32
38	Tsegay Tuemay	Eritrea	37:32
39	Lesiba Mashele	South Africa	37:36
40	Joseph Panga	Tanzania	37:43
41	Hizqel Tewelde	Eritrea	37:44
42	Jean Marie Uwajeneza	Rwanda	37:47
43	Gladwin Mzazi	South Africa	37:50
44	Mounir Miout	Algeria	37:51
45	Yerson Orellana	Peru	37:52
46	Eric Sebahire	Rwanda	37:53
47	Rabeh Khaouas	Algeria	38:00
48	Alphonce Felix Simbu	Tanzania	38:07
49	Liam Adams	Australia	38:08
50	Kelly Wiebe	Canada	38:14
51	Shadrack Hoff	South Africa	38:24
52	Hiroki Matsueda	Japan	38:24
53	Daniel Mateo	Spain	38:25
54	Bayron Piedra	Ecuador	38:25
55	Charlie Hulson	Great Britain	38:26
56	Edward Mwanza	Zambia	38:26
57	Maksim Korolev	United States	38:27
58	Antonio Abadía	Spain	38:28
59	Raúl Machacuay	Peru	38:28
60	Cesar Pilaluisa	Ecuador	38:29
61	Kgosi Tsosane	South Africa	38:36
62	Dinghong Yang	China	38:37
63	Olivier Irabaruta	Burundi	38:38
64	Mitchel Brown	Australia	38:40
65	John Bazili Baynit	Tanzania	38:44
66	Jhordan Alonso Ccope	Peru	38:50
67	Abdelkader Dali	Algeria	38:56
68	Adel Mechaal	Spain	38:57
69	James Nipperes	Australia	38:59
70	Dewi Griffiths	Great Britain	39:02
71	Renxue Zhu	China	39:12
72	Ligang Wang	China	39:18
73	Mohammed Merbouhi	Algeria	39:21
74	Lakshmanan Govindan	India	39:23
75	Selby Bonginkosi Zwane	South Africa	39:23
76	Vianney Ndiho	Burundi	39:30
77	Francisco Javier Abad	Spain	39:36
78	Timothée Bommier	France	39:39
79	Abdullah Abdulaziz Aljoud	Saudi Arabia	39:43
80	Bujie Duo	China	39:44
81	Ahmed Dali	Algeria	39:56
82	Jacob Mugomeri	Zimbabwe	40:01
83	Kevin Tree	Canada	40:02
84	Jonathan Hay	Great Britain	40:05
85	Kazuma Kubota	Japan	40:08
86	Andrew Butchart	Great Britain	40:11
87	David McNeill	Australia	40:15
88	Kento Hanazawa	Japan	40:19
89	Jianrong Du	China	40:20
90	Andrew Colley	United States	40:24
91	Ryan Cassidy	Canada	40:30
92	Adrian Pillajo	Ecuador	40:43
93	Christian Vasconez	Ecuador	40:50
94	Rene Champi	Peru	40:53
95	Hari Kumar Rimal	Nepal	40:53
96	Dheif Al Hammad	Jordan	40:54
97	Mijuenima	China	40:57
98	Berdigul Aitpai	Kyrgyzstan	40:59
99	Barry Britt	Canada	41:05
100	Ortik Ramazonov	Uzbekistan	41:13
101	Matthew Johnson	Canada	41:39
102	Khasan Gaforov	Tajikistan	42:01
103	Gantulga Dambadarjaa	Mongolia	42:19
104	Gaylord Silly	Seychelles	42:53
105	Hamdan Syafril Sayuti	Indonesia	43:12
106	Tenzin Thinley	Bhutan	44:30
107	Avikash Lal	Fiji	45:12
108	Ming-Sheng Li	Chinese Taipei	45:28
—	Sidi-Hassan Chahdi	France	DNF
—	Jianyong Fang	Singapore	DNF
—	Mohamed Elbayoumi	Egypt	DNS

==== Teams ====
Rank	Team	Points
1st place, gold medalist(s)	Ethiopia: Muktar Edris / 3; Hagos Gebrhiwet / 4; Tamirat Tola / 6; Atsedu Tsegay / 7; (Bonsa Dida) / (14); (Tesfaye Abera) / (26)	20
2nd place, silver medalist(s)	Kenya: Geoffrey Kipsang Kamworor / 1; Bedan Karoki Muchiri / 2; Leonard Barsoton / 5; Phillip Kiprono Langat / 12; (Moses Letoyie) / (16); (Joseph Kiprono Kiptum) / (21)	20
3rd place, bronze medalist(s)	Bahrain: Aweke Ayalew / 10; Albert Kibichii Rop / 11; El Hassan Elabbassi / 15; Isaac Korir / 18; (Zelalem Bacha) / (19); (Hassan Chani) / (20)	54
4	Eritrea: Abrar Osman / 13; Teklemariam Medhin / 17; Goitom Kifle / 23; Tsegay Tuemay / 38; (Hizqel Tewelde) / (41)	91
5	Uganda: Moses Kibet / 8; Phillip Kipyeko / 25; Timothy Toroitich / 27; Geofrey Kusuro / 32	92
6	Tanzania: Ismail Juma / 9; Fabiano Nelson Sulle / 33; Joseph Panga / 40; Alphonce Felix Simbu / 48; (John Bazili Baynit) / (65)	130
7	United States: Chris Derrick / 24; Ryan Vail / 34; Patrick Smyth / 36; Robert Curtis / 37; (Maksim Korolev) / (57); (Andrew Colley) / (90)	131
8	Rwanda: Pontien Ntawuyirushintege / 30; Félicien Muhitira / 35; Jean Marie Uwajeneza / 42; Eric Sebahire / 46	153
9	South Africa: Stephen Mokoka / 29; Lesiba Mashele / 39; Gladwin Mzazi / 43; Shadrack Hoff / 51; (Kgosi Tsosane) / (61); (Selby Bonginkosi Zwane) / (75)	162
10	Algeria: Rabah Aboud / 31; Mounir Miout / 44; Rabeh Khaouas / 47; Abdelkader Dali / 67; (Mohammed Merbouhi) / (73); (Ahmed Dali) / (81)	189
11	Australia: Brett Robinson / 28; Liam Adams / 49; Mitchel Brown / 64; James Nipperes / 69; (David McNeill) / (87)	210
12	Spain: Daniel Mateo / 53; Antonio Abadía / 58; Adel Mechaal / 68; Francisco Javier Abad / 77	256
13	Peru: Yerson Orellana / 45; Raúl Machacuay / 59; Jhordan Alonso Ccope / 66; Rene Champi / 94	264
14	China: Dinghong Yang / 62; Renxue Zhue / 71; Ligang Wang / 72; Bujie Duo / 80; (Jianrong Du) / (89); (Mijuenima) / (97)	285
15	Great Britain: Charlie Hulson / 55; Dewi Griffiths / 70; Jonathan Hay / 84; Andrew Butchart / 86	295
16	Ecuador: Bayron Piedra / 54; Cesar Pilaluisa / 60; Adrian Pillajo / 92; Christian Vasconez / 93	299
17	Canada: Kelly Wiebe / 50; Kevin Tree / 83; Ryan Cassidy / 91; Barry Britt / 99; (Matthew Johnson) / (101)	323

- Note: Athletes in parentheses did not score for the team result.

== Participation ==
According to an unofficial count, 110 athletes from 37 countries participated in the Senior men's race.

- Algeria (6)
- Australia (5)
- Bahrain (6)
- Bhutan (1)
- Burundi (2)
- Canada (5)
- China (6)
- Chinese Taipei (1)
- Ecuador (4)
- Eritrea (5)
- Ethiopia (6)
- Fiji (1)
- France (2)
- Great Britain (4)
- India (1)
- Indonesia (1)
- Japan (3)
- Jordan (1)
- Kenya (6)
- Kyrgyzstan (1)
- Mongolia (1)
- Nepal (1)
- Peru (4)
- Rwanda (4)
- Saudi Arabia (1)
- Seychelles (1)
- Singapore (1)
- South Africa (6)
- Spain (4)
- Tajikistan (1)
- Tanzania (5)
- Turkey (1)
- Uganda (4)
- United States (6)
- Uzbekistan (1)
- Zambia (1)
- Zimbabwe (1)

== See also ==
- 2015 IAAF World Cross Country Championships – Junior men's race
- 2015 IAAF World Cross Country Championships – Senior women's race
- 2015 IAAF World Cross Country Championships – Junior women's race
