= 2015 IAAF World Cross Country Championships – Senior women's race =

Senior women's race at the 2015 IAAF World Cross Country Championships
- Organisers: IAAF
- Edition: 41st
- Date: March 28
- Host city: Guiyang, China
- Venue: Guiyang horse racing circuit
- Events: 1
- Distances: 8 km – Senior women
- Participation: 82 athletes from 25 nations

The Senior women's race at the 2015 IAAF World Cross Country Championships was held at the Guiyang horse racing circuit in Guiyang, China, on March 28, 2015. Reports of the event were given for the IAAF.

Complete results for individuals, and for teams were published.

== Race results ==
=== Senior women's race (8 km) ===
==== Individual ====
Rank	Athlete	Country	Time
1st place, gold medalist(s)	Agnes Jebet Tirop	Kenya	26:01
2nd place, silver medalist(s)	Senbere Teferi	Ethiopia	26:06
3rd place, bronze medalist(s)	Netsanet Gudeta	Ethiopia	26:11
4	Alemitu Heroye	Ethiopia	26:14
5	Stacy Chepkemboi Ndiwa	Kenya	26:16
6	Emily Chebet Muge	Kenya	26:18
7	Irene Chepet Cheptai	Kenya	26:26
8	Mamitu Daska	Ethiopia	26:29
9	Belaynesh Oljira	Ethiopia	26:29
10	Genet Yalew	Ethiopia	27:00
11	Nazret Weldu	Eritrea	27:19
12	Janet Kisa	Kenya	27:22
13	Margaret Chelimo Kipkemboi	Kenya	27:32
14	Juliet Chekwel	Uganda	27:40
15	Trihas Gebre	Spain	27:50
16	Ding Changqin	China	27:52
17	Zhang Xinyan	China	28:02
18	Gemma Steel	Great Britain	28:14
19	Rhona Auckland	Great Britain	28:17
20	Sara Hall	United States	28:19
21	Gladys Tejeda	Peru	28:22
22	Wu Xufeng	China	28:24
23	Miho Shimizu	Japan	28:26
24	Nyakisi Adero	Uganda	28:31
25	Rachel Hannah	Canada	28:34
26	Amina Bettiche	Algeria	28:40
27	Natasha Wodak	Canada	28:43
28	Nawal Yahi	Algeria	28:44
29	Laura Thweatt	United States	28:49
30	Patricia Chepkwemoi	Uganda	28:51
31	Wilma Arizapana	Peru	28:52
32	Olivia Mugove Chitate	Zimbabwe	28:53
33	Emily Chebet	Uganda	28:55
34	Mattie Suver	United States	29:00
35	Sara Sig Møller	Denmark	29:03
36	Nolene Conrad	South Africa	29:05
37	Diana Martín	Spain	29:06
38	Iris Fuentes-Pila	Spain	29:09
39	Mai Shoji	Japan	29:09
40	Victoria Mitchell	Australia	29:11
41	Barkahoum Drici	Algeria	29:14
42	Courtney Powell	Australia	29:15
43	Erika Ikeda	Japan	29:17
44	Souad Aït Salem	Algeria	29:18
45	Brianna Felnagle	United States	29:19
46	Dina Lebo Phalula	South Africa	29:26
47	Karina Villazana	Peru	29:29
48	Annie Bothma	South Africa	29:29
49	Jacqueline Martín	Spain	29:30
50	Gemma Maini	Australia	29:37
51	Jennifer Rhines	United States	29:39
52	Lidia Rodríguez	Spain	29:42
53	Bayartsogt Munkhzaya	Mongolia	29:44
54	Yui Fukuda	Japan	29:45
55	Jessica Trengove	Australia	29:47
56	Maki Izumida	Japan	29:50
57	Eliona Delgado	Peru	29:52
58	Aurore Guerin	France	29:52
59	Lindsay Carson	Canada	29:53
60	Natasha Labeaud	Canada	29:55
61	Emily Brichacek	Australia	29:57
62	Lorraine Novela	South Africa	30:00
63	Tomoka Kimura	Japan	30:01
64	Elaina Balouris	United States	30:14
65	Mamphielo Sibanda	South Africa	30:18
66	Nabila Sifi	Algeria	30:21
67	Yang Hua	China	30:22
68	Fiona Benson	Canada	30:29
69	Keneilwe Sesing	South Africa	30:32
70	Simone Christensen Glad	Denmark	30:41
71	Louise Langelund Batting	Denmark	30:59
72	Malika Benderbal	Algeria	31:00
73	Xu Qiuzi	China	31:07
74	Swati Haridas Gadhave	India	31:31
75	Li Zhixuan	China	31:36
76	Rini Budiarti	Indonesia	32:32
77	Ekaterina Tunguskova	Uzbekistan	33:12
78	Bishwa Rupa Budha	Nepal	33:33
79	Ying Rong Mok	Singapore	36:08
80	Dilshoda Rahmonova	Tajikistan	38:30
—	Kaltoum Bouaasayriya	Morocco	DNF
—	Nancy Cheptegei	Uganda	DNF
—	Jillian Forsey	Canada	DNS

==== Teams ====
Rank	Team	Points
1st place, gold medalist(s)	Ethiopia: Senbere Teferi / 2; Netsanet Gudeta / 3; Alemitu Heroye / 4; Mamitu Daska / 8; (Belaynesh Oljira) / (9); (Genet Yalew) / (10)	17
2nd place, silver medalist(s)	Kenya: Agnes Jebet Tirop / 1; Stacy Chepkemboi Ndiwa / 5; Emily Chebet Muge / 6; Irene Chepet Cheptai / 7; (Janet Kisa) / (12); (Margaret Chelimo Kipkemboi) / (13)	19
3rd place, bronze medalist(s)	Uganda: Juliet Chekwel / 14; Nyakisi Adero / 24; Patricia Chepkwemoi / 30; Emily Chebet / 33; (Nancy Cheptegei) / (DNF)	101
4	China: Ding Changqin / 16; Zhang Xinyan / 17; Wu Xufeng / 22; Yang Hua / 67; (Xu Qiuzi) / (73); (Li Zhixuan) / (75)	122
5	United States: Sara Hall / 20; Laura Thweatt / 29; Mattie Suver / 34; Brianna Felnagle / 45; (Jennifer Rhines) / (51); (Elaina Balouris) / (64)	128
6	Algeria: Amina Bettiche / 26; Nawal Yahi / 28; Barkahoum Drici / 41; Souad Aït Salem / 44; (Nabila Sifi) / (66); (Malika Benderbal) / (72)	139
7	Spain: Tirhas Gebre / 15; Diana Martín / 37; Iris Fuentes-Pila / 38; Jacqueline Martín / 49; (Lidia Rodríguez) / (52)	139
8	Peru: Gladys Tejeda / 21; Wilma Arizapana / 31; Karina Villazana / 47; Eliona Delgado / 57	156
9	Japan: Miho Shimizu / 23; Mai Shoji / 39; Erika Ikeda / 43; Yui Fukuda / 54; (Maki Izumida) / (56); (Tomoka Kimura) / (63)	159
10	Canada: Rachel Hannah / 25; Natasha Wodak / 27; Lindsay Carson / 59; Natasha Labeaud / 60; (Fiona Benson) / (68); (Jillian Forsey) / (DNS)	171
11	Australia: Victoria Mitchell / 40; Courtney Powell / 42; Gemma Maini / 50; Jessica Trengove / 55; (Emily Brichacek) / (61)	187
12	South Africa: Nolene Conrad / 36; Dina Lebo Phalula / 46; Annie Bothma / 48; Lorraine Novela / 62; (Mamphielo Sibanda) / (65); (Keneilwe Sesing) / (69)	192

- Note: Athletes in parentheses did not score for the team result.

== Participation ==
According to an unofficial count, 82 athletes from 25 countries participated in the Senior women's race.

- Algeria (6)
- Australia (5)
- Canada (5)
- China (6)
- Denmark (3)
- Eritrea (1)
- Ethiopia (6)
- France (1)
- Great Britain (2)
- India (1)
- Indonesia (1)
- Japan (6)
- Kenya (6)
- Mongolia (1)
- Morocco (1)
- Nepal (1)
- Peru (4)
- Singapore (1)
- South Africa (6)
- Spain (5)
- Tajikistan (1)
- Uganda (5)
- United States (6)
- Uzbekistan (1)
- Zimbabwe (1)

== See also ==
- 2015 IAAF World Cross Country Championships – Senior men's race
- 2015 IAAF World Cross Country Championships – Junior men's race
- 2015 IAAF World Cross Country Championships – Junior women's race
