= 2013 IAAF World Cross Country Championships – Senior women's race =

Senior women's race at the 2013 IAAF World Cross Country Championships
- Organisers: IAAF
- Edition: 40th
- Date: March 24
- Host city: Bydgoszcz, Województwo kujawsko-pomorskie, Poland
- Venue: Myślęcinek Park
- Events: 1
- Distances: 8 km – Senior women
- Participation: 97 athletes from 29 nations

The Senior women's race at the 2013 IAAF World Cross Country Championships was held at the Myślęcinek Park in Bydgoszcz, Poland, on March 24, 2013. Reports of the event were given in the Herald and for the IAAF.

Complete results for individuals, and for teams were published.

== Race results ==
=== Senior women's race (8 km) ===
==== Individual ====
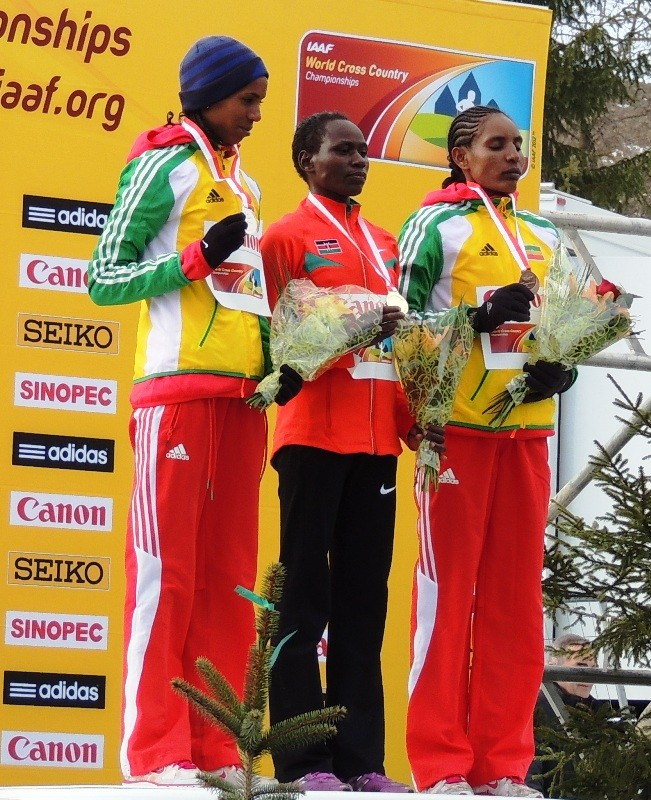
The medalists

| Rank | Athlete | Country | Time |
|---|---|---|---|
| 1st place, gold medalist(s) | Emily Chebet | Kenya | 24:24 |
| 2nd place, silver medalist(s) | Hiwot Ayalew | Ethiopia | 24:27 |
| 3rd place, bronze medalist(s) | Belaynesh Oljira | Ethiopia | 24:33 |
| 4 | Shitaye Eshete | Bahrain | 24:34 |
| 5 | Margaret Wangari Muriuki | Kenya | 24:39 |
| 6 | Janet Kisa | Kenya | 24:46 |
| 7 | Viola Jelagat Kibiwot | Kenya | 24:46 |
| 8 | Tejitu Daba | Bahrain | 24:55 |
| 9 | Juliet Chekwel | Uganda | 24:58 |
| 10 | Irene Chepet Cheptai | Kenya | 25:01 |
| 11 | Beatrice Chepkemoi Mutai | Kenya | 25:05 |
| 12 | Salima El Ouali Alami | Morocco | 25:05 |
| 13 | Neely Spence | United States | 25:08 |
| 14 | Fionnuala Britton | Ireland | 25:08 |
| 15 | Genet Yalew | Ethiopia | 25:10 |
| 16 | Sophie Duarte | France | 25:17 |
| 17 | Almensh Belete | Belgium | 25:24 |
| 18 | Kenza Dahmani Tifahi | Algeria | 25:26 |
| 19 | Nazret Weldu | Eritrea | 25:27 |
| 20 | Kareema Jasim | Bahrain | 25:27 |
| 21 | Emily Infeld | United States | 25:27 |
| 22 | Diana Martín | Spain | 25:29 |
| 23 | Nadia Noujani | Morocco | 25:30 |
| 24 | Natasha Fraser | Canada | 25:30 |
| 25 | Rachel Cliff | Canada | 25:30 |
| 26 | Mattie Suver | United States | 25:41 |
| 27 | Mary Teresa Cullen | Ireland | 25:42 |
| 28 | Sule Utura | Ethiopia | 25:43 |
| 29 | Yebrgual Melese | Ethiopia | 25:44 |
| 30 | Kim Conley | United States | 25:45 |
| 31 | Gemma Steel | United Kingdom | 25:47 |
| 32 | Linda Byrne | Ireland | 25:49 |
| 33 | Laurane Picoche | France | 25:50 |
| 34 | Deena Kastor | United States | 25:52 |
| 35 | Christelle Daunay | France | 25:53 |
| 36 | Luula Berhane | Eritrea | 25:55 |
| 37 | Louise Damen | United Kingdom | 25:55 |
| 38 | Christine Bardelle | France | 25:56 |
| 39 | Janet Achola | Uganda | 25:58 |
| 40 | Stephanie Twell | United Kingdom | 25:58 |
| 41 | Genzeb Shumi | Bahrain | 25:59 |
| 42 | Ava Hutchinson | Ireland | 25:59 |
| 43 | Fiori Asefaw | Eritrea | 25:59 |
| 44 | Carla Salomé Rocha | Portugal | 26:01 |
| 45 | Clémence Calvin | France | 26:03 |
| 46 | Eleanor Baker | United Kingdom | 26:04 |
| 47 | Delilah DiCrescenzo | United States | 26:05 |
| 48 | Lauren Howarth | United Kingdom | 26:05 |
| 49 | Olivia Mugove | Zimbabwe | 26:07 |
| 50 | Azucena Díaz | Spain | 26:07 |
| 51 | Agnieszka Ciołek | Poland | 26:08 |
| 52 | Aster Tesfaye | Bahrain | 26:20 |
| 53 | Dina Lebo Phalula | South Africa | 26:22 |
| 54 | Sonia Bejarano | Spain | 26:24 |
| 55 | Beverly Ramos | Puerto Rico | 26:25 |
| 56 | Fu Tinglian | China | 26:29 |
| 57 | Teresa Urbina | Spain | 26:30 |
| 58 | Rachel Hannah | Canada | 26:35 |
| 59 | Tatiele Roberta de Carvalho | Brazil | 26:36 |
| 60 | Lindsay Carson | Canada | 26:38 |
| 61 | Katarzyna Kowalska | Poland | 26:40 |
| 62 | Ayuko Suzuki | Japan | 26:41 |
| 63 | Lavinia Haitope | Namibia | 26:44 |
| 64 | Yukari Abe | Japan | 26:46 |
| 65 | Emily Wicks | United Kingdom | 26:48 |
| 66 | Gema Barrachina | Spain | 26:51 |
| 67 | Monica Madalina Florea | Romania | 26:52 |
| 68 | Rebecca Cheptegei | Uganda | 26:53 |
| 69 | Juliana Paula dos Santos | Brazil | 26:54 |
| 70 | Elizabeth Lee | Ireland | 26:55 |
| 71 | Angelika Cichocka | Poland | 26:55 |
| 72 | Viola Chemos | Uganda | 26:55 |
| 73 | Dominika Napieraj | Poland | 26:55 |
| 74 | Linet Chebet | Uganda | 26:56 |
| 75 | Hanae Tanaka | Japan | 26:56 |
| 76 | Maria Bernard | Canada | 26:58 |
| 77 | Miho Ihara | Japan | 27:01 |
| 78 | Tasmin McMahon | Australia | 27:06 |
| 79 | Nolene Conrad | South Africa | 27:08 |
| 80 | Michele Cristina das Chagas | Brazil | 27:10 |
| 81 | Sophie Barker | Australia | 27:13 |
| 82 | Hitomi Niiya | Japan | 27:20 |
| 83 | Xiao Huimin | China | 27:21 |
| 84 | Urszula Nęcka | Poland | 27:23 |
| 85 | Mai Ishibashi | Japan | 27:28 |
| 86 | Mapaseka Makhanya | South Africa | 27:33 |
| 87 | Christine Kalmer | South Africa | 27:45 |
| 88 | Jiang Xiaoli | China | 27:50 |
| 89 | Touria Samiri | Italy | 27:59 |
| 90 | Valdilene Silva | Brazil | 28:01 |
| 91 | Celia Sullohern | Australia | 28:06 |
| 92 | Paula Kopciewska | Poland | 28:12 |
| 93 | Imen Mathnani | Tunisia | 28:36 |
| 94 | Tara Palm | Australia | 28:47 |
| 95 | Gulshanoi Satarova | Kyrgyzstan | 29:26 |
| 96 | Namakando Namakando | Zambia | 31:27 |
| — | Meselech Melkamu | Ethiopia | DNF |

==== Teams ====
| Rank | Team | Points |
|---|---|---|
| 1st place, gold medalist(s) | Kenya: Emily Chebet / 1; Margaret Wangari Muriuki / 5; Janet Kisa / 6; Viola Jelagat Kibiwot / 7; (Irene Chepet Cheptai) / (10); (Beatrice Chepkemoi Mutai) / (11) | 19 |
| 2nd place, silver medalist(s) | Ethiopia: Hiwot Ayalew / 2; Belaynesh Oljira / 3; Genet Yalew / 15; Sule Utura / 28; (Yebrqual Melese) / (29); (Meselech Melkamu) / (DNF) | 48 |
| 3rd place, bronze medalist(s) | Bahrain: Shitaye Eshete / 4; Tejitu Daba / 8; Kareema Jasim / 20; Genzeb Shumi / 41; (Aster Tesfaye) / (52) | 73 |
| 4 | United States: Neely Spence / 13; Emily Infeld / 21; Mattie Suver / 26; Kim Conley / 30; (Deena Kastor) / (34); (Delilah DiCrescenzo) / (47) | 90 |
| 5 | Ireland: Fionnuala Britton / 14; Mary Teresa Cullen / 27; Linda Byrne / 32; Ava Hutchinson / 42; (Elizabeth Lee) / (70) | 115 |
| 6 | France: Sophie Duarte / 16; Laurane Picoche / 33; Christelle Daunay / 35; Christine Bardelle / 38; (Clémence Calvin) / (45) | 122 |
| 7 | United Kingdom: Gemma Steel / 31; Louise Damen / 37; Stephanie Twell / 40; Eleanor Baker / 46; (Lauren Howarth) / (48); (Emily Wicks) / (65) | 154 |
| 8 | Canada: Natasha Fraser / 24; Rachel Cliff / 25; Rachel Hannah / 58; Lindsay Carson / 60; (Maria Bernard) / (76) | 167 |
| 9 | Spain: Diana Martín / 22; Azucena Díaz / 50; Sonia Bejarano / 54; Teresa Urbina / 57; (Gema Barrachina) / (66) | 183 |
| 10 | Uganda: Juliet Chekwel / 9; Janet Achola / 39; Rebecca Cheptegei / 68; Viola Chemos / 72; (Linet Chebet) / (74) | 188 |
| 11 | Poland: Agnieszka Ciołek / 51; Katarzyna Kowalska / 61; Angelika Cichocka / 71; Dominika Napieraj / 73; (Urszula Nęcka) / (84); (Paula Kopciewska) / (92) | 256 |
| 12 | Japan: Ayuko Suzuki / 62; Yukari Abe / 64; Hanae Tanaka / 75; Miho Ihara / 77; (Hitomi Niiya) / (82); (Mai Ishibashi) / (85) | 278 |
| 13 | Brazil: Tatiele Roberta de Carvalho / 59; Juliana Paula dos Santos / 69; Michele Cristina das Chagas / 80; Valdilene Silva / 90 | 298 |
| 14 | South Africa: Dina Lebo Phalula / 53; Nolene Conrad / 79; Mapaseka Makhanya / 86; Christine Kalmer / 87 | 305 |
| 15 | Australia: Tasmin McMahon / 78; Sophie Barker / 81; Celia Sullohern / 91; Tara Palm / 94 | 344 |

- Note: Athletes in parentheses did not score for the team result.

== Participation ==
According to an unofficial count, 97 athletes from 29 countries participated in the Senior women's race.

- Algeria (1)
- Australia (4)
- Bahrain (5)
- Belgium (1)
- Brazil (4)
- Canada (5)
- China (3)
- Eritrea (3)
- Ethiopia (6)
- France (5)
- Ireland (5)
- Italy (1)
- Japan (6)
- Kenya (6)
- Kyrgyzstan (1)
- Morocco (2)
- Namibia (1)
- Poland (6)
- Portugal (1)
- Puerto Rico (1)
- Romania (1)
- South Africa (4)
- Spain (5)
- Tunisia (1)
- Uganda (5)
- United Kingdom (6)
- United States (6)
- Zambia (1)
- Zimbabwe (1)

== See also ==
- 2013 IAAF World Cross Country Championships – Senior men's race
- 2013 IAAF World Cross Country Championships – Junior men's race
- 2013 IAAF World Cross Country Championships – Junior women's race
