= 2015 IAAF World Cross Country Championships – Junior men's race =

Junior men's race at the 2015 IAAF World Cross Country Championships
- Organisers: IAAF
- Edition: 41st
- Date: March 28
- Host city: Guiyang, China
- Venue: Guiyang horse racing circuit
- Events: 1
- Distances: 8 km – Junior men
- Participation: 118 athletes from 26 nations

The Junior men's race at the 2015 IAAF World Cross Country Championships was held at the Guiyang horse racing circuit in Guiyang, China, on March 28, 2015. Reports of the event were given for the IAAF.

Complete results for individuals, and for teams were published.

== Race results ==
=== Junior men's race (8 km) ===
==== Individual ====
Rank	Athlete	Country	Time
1st place, gold medalist(s)	Yasin Haji	Ethiopia	23:42
2nd place, silver medalist(s)	Geoffrey Kipkirui Korir	Kenya	23:47
3rd place, bronze medalist(s)	Alfred Ngeno	Kenya	23:54
4	Dominic Kiptarus	Kenya	24:00
5	Evans Rutto Chematot	Bahrain	24:03
6	Abraham Habte	Eritrea	24:04
7	Yihunilign Adane	Ethiopia	24:05
8	Abe Gashahun	Ethiopia	24:08
9	Fred Musobo	Uganda	24:10
10	Rodgers Chumo	Kenya	24:11
11	Joshua Kiprui Cheptegei	Uganda	24:11
12	Moses Koech	Kenya	24:11
13	Afewerki Berhane	Eritrea	24:22
14	Mogos Shumay	Eritrea	24:23
15	Abdi Ali Gelchu	Bahrain	24:29
16	John Langat	Kenya	24:29
17	Haymanot Alewe	Ethiopia	24:37
18	Soufiane Elbakkali	Morocco	24:46
19	Aron Kifle	Eritrea	24:52
20	Yemaneberhan Crippa	Italy	24:52
21	Yohans Mekasha	Ethiopia	24:53
22	Derara Hurisa	Bahrain	24:55
23	Yemane Haileselassie	Eritrea	25:08
24	Adane Weletaw	Ethiopia	25:18
25	Justyn Knight	Canada	25:22
26	Robert Chemonges	Uganda	25:25
27	John Dressel	United States	25:25
28	Abdi Ibrahim Abdo	Bahrain	25:27
29	Conner Mantz	United States	25:28
30	Mande Bushendich	Uganda	25:31
31	Mohammed Baybat	Morocco	25:32
32	Abel Chebet	Uganda	25:35
33	Yohanes Chiappinelli	Italy	25:44
34	Cerake Geberkidane	United States	25:46
35	Hiroyuki Sakaguchi	Japan	25:46
36	Julien Wanders	Switzerland	25:47
37	Abdalla Targan	Sudan	25:51
38	Hicham Chemlal	Morocco	25:53
39	Alex George	Great Britain	25:54
40	Morgan McDonald	Australia	25:56
41	Daniel do Nascimento	Brazil	25:57
42	Eric Hamer	United States	25:58
43	Creel Chavalala	South Africa	26:03
44	William Levay	Sweden	26:03
45	Wei Wang	China	26:04
46	Said Ettaqy	Italy	26:07
47	Hugo Hay	France	26:13
48	Takieddine Hedeilli	Algeria	26:14
49	Shota Onizuka	Japan	26:16
50	Guojun Chen	China	26:16
51	Qinghua Zong	China	26:17
52	Amine Zahaf	Morocco	26:19
53	Joe Steward	Great Britain	26:21
54	Elhadi Adam	Sudan	26:24
55	Junnosuke Matsuo	Japan	26:27
56	Adam Mohamed	Sudan	26:28
57	Ayoub Mokhtar	Spain	26:29
58	Kabelo Melamu	South Africa	26:30
59	Paul Roberts	United States	26:31
60	Billal Tarebhat	Algeria	26:32
61	Haruki Minatoya	Japan	26:34
62	Fabien Palcau	France	26:36
63	Tianyu Chen	China	26:36
64	Idriss Moussa Youssouf	Qatar	26:37
65	Siyabonga Mabena	South Africa	26:41
66	Amazigh Amrouni	Algeria	26:41
67	Danmuzhenciwang	China	26:42
68	Adam Abdelwahab	Sudan	26:50
69	Maxime Hueber Moosbrugger	France	26:51
70	William Potgieter	South Africa	26:52
71	El Mahdi Lahouifi	Spain	26:54
72	Elliot Bowker	Great Britain	26:55
73	Oussama Nabil	Morocco	26:56
74	Paul Miller	United States	26:57
75	Youcef Boulekdam	Algeria	26:57
76	Jordi Torrents	Spain	26:59
77	Alessandro Giacobazzi	Italy	26:59
78	Yaser Ba-Gharab	Yemen	27:04
79	Jonathan Glen	Great Britain	27:10
80	Jimmy Gressier	France	27:10
81	Ryoji Tatezawa	Japan	27:14
82	Yassin Bouih	Italy	27:15
83	Ben Preisner	Canada	27:16
84	Nathan Tadesse	Canada	27:17
85	Dionatan dos Santos	Brazil	27:17
86	Rory Linkletter	Canada	27:18
87	Fuminori Shimo	Japan	27:18
88	Mohamed Amine El Bouajaji	France	27:22
89	Jeremy Belkacem	France	27:23
90	Cairen Suolang	China	27:25
91	Tawfiq Bouziane	Algeria	27:28
92	Simone Colombini	Italy	27:29
93	Fábio Gomes	Portugal	27:31
94	Jeremiah Ort	Canada	27:37
95	Patrick Barbosa	Brazil	27:43
96	Felipe Rocha e Pinto	Brazil	27:45
97	Rowhaldo Ratz	South Africa	27:48
98	Mohammed Rageh	Yemen	27:52
99	Ebrahim Shabil	Yemen	27:53
100	Mohamed Elnazir Ramadan	Qatar	27:56
101	Patryk Blaszczyk	Poland	27:59
102	Christopher Olley	Great Britain	28:00
103	Bryce Anderson	Australia	28:01
104	Ben Kelly	Australia	28:04
105	Abdullah Al-Qwabani	Yemen	28:14
106	Charles Hunter	Australia	28:28
107	Shokhrukh Davlatov	Uzbekistan	28:39
108	Ibrahim Omar Abdi	Qatar	28:39
109	Yahya Al-Fakih	Yemen	28:39
110	Nathan Pearce	Australia	29:02
111	Ussama Ifraj	Spain	29:20
112	Jules Burnotte	Canada	29:25
113	Abubaker Haydar Abdalla	Qatar	31:11
—	Hossny Eisa	Sudan	DNF
—	Jac Hopkins	Great Britain	DNF
—	Menad Lamrani	Algeria	DNF
—	Matthew Ramsden	Australia	DNF
—	Damian Sator	Poland	DNF

==== Teams ====
Rank	Team	Points
1st place, gold medalist(s)	Kenya: Geoffrey Kipkirui Korir / 2; Alfred Ngeno / 3; Dominic Kiptarus / 4; Rodgers Chumo / 10; (Moses Koech) / (12); (John Langat) / (16)	19
2nd place, silver medalist(s)	Ethiopia: Yasin Haji / 1; Yihunilign Adane / 7; Abe Gashahun / 8; Haymanot Alewe / 17; (Yohans Mekasha) / (21); (Adane Weletaw) / (24)	33
3rd place, bronze medalist(s)	Eritrea: Abraham Habte / 6; Afewerki Berhane / 13; Mogos Shumay / 14; Aron Kifle / 19; (Yemane Haileselassie) / (23)	52
4	Bahrain: Evans Rutto Chematot / 5; Abdi Ali Gelchu / 15; Derara Hurisa / 22; Abdi Ibrahim Abdo / 28	70
5	Uganda: Fred Musobo / 9; Joshua Kiprui Cheptegei / 11; Robert Chemonges / 26; Mande Bushendich / 30; (Abel Chebet) / (32)	76
6	United States: John Dressel / 27; Conner Mantz / 29; Cerake Geberkidane / 34; Eric Hamer / 42; (Paul Roberts) / (59); (Paul Miller) / (74)	132
7	Morocco: Soufiane Elbakkali / 18; Mohammed Baybat / 31; Hicham Chemlal / 38; Amine Zahaf / 52; (Oussama Nabil) / (73)	139
8	Italy: Yemaneberhan Crippa / 20; Yohanes Chiappinelli / 33; Said Ettaqy / 46; Alessandro Giacobazzi / 77; (Yassin Bouih) / (82); (Simone Colombini) / (92)	176
9	Japan: Hiroyuki Sakaguchi / 35; Shota Onizuka / 49; Junnosuke Matsuo / 55; Haruki Minatoya / 61; (Ryoji Tatezawa) / (81); (Fuminori Shimo) / (87)	200
10	China: Wei Wang / 45; Guojun Chen / 50; Qinghua Zong / 51; Tianyu Chen / 63; (Danmuzhenciwang) / (67); (Cairen Suolang) / (90)	209
11	Sudan: Abdalla Targan / 37; Elhadi Adam / 54; Adam Mohamed / 56; Adam Abdelwahab / 68; (Hossny Eisa) / (DNF)	215
12	South Africa: Creel Chavalala / 43; Kabelo Melamu / 58; Siyabonga Mabena / 65; William Potgieter / 70; (Rowhaldo Ratz) / (97)	236
13	Great Britain: Alex George / 39; Joe Steward / 53; Elliot Bowker / 72; Jonathan Glen / 79; (Christopher Olley) / (102); (Jac Hopkins) / (DNF)	243
14	Algeria: Takieddine Hedeilli / 48; Billal Tarebhat / 60; Amazigh Amrouni / 66; Youcef Boulekdam / 75; (Tawfiq Bouziane) / (91); (Menad Lamrani) / (DNF)	249
15	France: Hugo Hay / 47; Fabien Palcau / 62; Maxime Hueber Moosbrugger / 69; Jimmy Gressier / 80; (Mohamed Amine El Bouajaji) / (88); (Jeremy Belkacem) / (89)	258
16	Canada: Justyn Knight / 25; Ben Preisner / 83; Nathan Tadesse / 84; Rory Linkletter / 86; (Jeremiah Ort) / (94); (Jules Burnotte) / (112)	278
17	Spain: Ayoub Mokhtar / 57; El Mahdi Lahouifi / 71; Jordi Torrents / 76; Ussama Ifraj / 111	315
18	Brazil: Daniel do Nascimento / 41; Dionatan dos Santos / 85; Patrick Barbosa / 95; Felipe Rocha e Pinto / 96	317
19	Australia: Morgan McDonald / 40; Bryce Anderson / 103; Ben Kelly / 104; Charles Hunter / 106; (Nathan Pearce) / (110); (Matthew Ramsden) / (DNF)	353
20	Yemen: Yaser Ba-Gharab / 78; Mohammed Rageh / 98; Ebrahim Shabil / 99; Abdullah Al-Qwabani / 105; (Yahya Al-Fakih) / (109)	380
21	Qatar: Idriss Moussa Youssouf / 64; Mohamed Elnazir Ramadan / 100; Ibrahim Omar Abdi / 108; Abubaker Haydar Abdalla / 113	385

- Note: Athletes in parentheses did not score for the team result.

== Participation ==
According to an unofficial count, 118 athletes from 26 countries participated in the Junior men's race.

- Algeria (6)
- Australia (6)
- Bahrain (4)
- Brazil (4)
- Canada (6)
- China (6)
- Eritrea (5)
- Ethiopia (6)
- France (6)
- Great Britain (6)
- Italy (6)
- Japan (6)
- Kenya (6)
- Morocco (5)
- Poland (2)
- Portugal (1)
- Qatar (4)
- South Africa (5)
- Spain (4)
- Sudan (5)
- Sweden (1)
- Switzerland (1)
- Uganda (5)
- United States (6)
- Uzbekistan (1)
- Yemen (5)

== See also ==
- 2015 IAAF World Cross Country Championships – Senior men's race
- 2015 IAAF World Cross Country Championships – Senior women's race
- 2015 IAAF World Cross Country Championships – Junior women's race
