= Nolene Conrad =

South African long-distance runner

Personal information
- Born: 26 July 1985 (age 40)

Sport
- Country: South Africa
- Sport: Long-distance running

Nolene Conrad (born 26 July 1985) is a South African long-distance runner.

In 2013, she competed in the senior women's race at the 2013 IAAF World Cross Country Championships held in Bydgoszcz, Poland. She finished in 79th place. In 2015, she competed in the senior women's race at the 2015 IAAF World Cross Country Championships held in Guiyang, China. She finished in 36th place.

In 2018, she competed in the women's half marathon at the 2018 IAAF World Half Marathon Championships held in Valencia, Spain. She finished in 25th place.
