= Genet Yalew =

Ethiopian long-distance runner (born 1992)

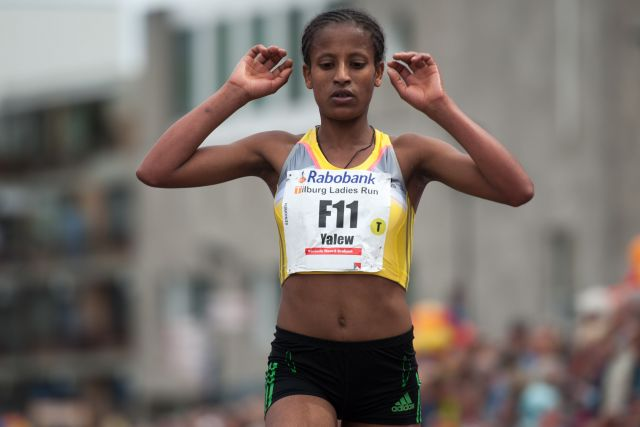
- Genet Yalew during 10K Tilburg (2013)

Medal record

Women's athletics

Representing Ethiopia

IAAF World Cross Country Championships
Gold medal – first place	2015 Guiyang	Team
Silver medal – second place	2013 Bydgoszcz	Team

IAAF World Half Marathon Championships
Silver medal – second place	2016 Cardiff	Team
Silver medal – second place	2014 Copenhagen	Team

Genet Yalew Kassahun (born 31 December 1992) is an Ethiopian professional long-distance runner who competes in track, cross country and road running events. Her half marathon best of 66:26 minutes is the Ethiopian record and ranks her in the top ten all-time for the sport.

As an age-category athlete she won several individual medals, first taking 3000 metres bronze at the 2009 World Youth Championships in Athletics, then the junior silver at the 2011 IAAF World Cross Country Championships and finally another track bronze at the 2011 African Junior Athletics Championships. As part of the Ethiopian junior cross country team, she shared in a silver in 2010 before leading the team to gold in the 2011 edition. She began competing on the IAAF Diamond League senior circuit in the 2011 and 2012 seasons.

Genet was a medal-winning team member for Ethiopia at the 2013 IAAF World Cross Country Championships and won a second team silver at the 2014 IAAF World Half Marathon Championships. She shared in the team gold medal at the 2015 IAAF World Cross Country Championships, but was not a point-scoring member of the team, having finished in tenth. On the track, she came short of a medal over 10,000 metres at the 2014 African Championships in Athletics, and was again off the podium at the 2015 African Games, taking fifth in the 5000 m. She finished in that same place at the 2016 IAAF World Half Marathon Championships, which helped an Ethiopian team of Netsanet Gudeta, Genet and Dehininet Demsew to the silver medals.

== International competitions ==
Year	Competition	Venue	Position	Event	Notes
2009	World Youth Championships	Brixen, Italy	3rd	3000 m	9:08.95
2010	World Cross Country Championships	Bydgoszcz, Poland	5th	Junior race	19:03
2010	World Cross Country Championships	Bydgoszcz, Poland	2nd	Junior team	30 pts
2010	World Junior Championships	Moncton, Canada	6th	3000 m	9:01.75
2011	World Cross Country Championships	Punta Umbría, Spain	2nd	Junior race	18:54
2011	World Cross Country Championships	Punta Umbría, Spain	1st	Junior team	17 pts
2011	African Junior Championships	Gaborone, Botswana	3rd	5000 m	15:27.96
2012	African Cross Country Championships	Cape Town, South Africa	8th	Senior race	27:49
2012	African Cross Country Championships	Cape Town, South Africa	2nd	Senior team	1:50:26
2013	World Cross Country Championships	Bydgoszcz, Poland	15th	Senior race	25:10
2013	World Cross Country Championships	Bydgoszcz, Poland	2nd	Senior team	48 pts
2014	World Half Marathon Championships	Copenhagen, Denmark	10th	Half marathon	1:09:15
2014	World Half Marathon Championships	Copenhagen, Denmark	2nd	Team	3:27:05
2014	African Championships	Marrakesh, Morocco	4th	10,000 m	32:52.46
2015	World Cross Country Championships	Guiyang, China	10th	Senior race	27:00
2015	World Cross Country Championships	Guiyang, China	1st	Senior team	17 pts
2015	African Games	Brazzaville, Republic of the Congo	5th	5000 m	15:43.77
2016	World Half Marathon Championships	Cardiff, United Kingdom	5th	Half marathon	1:08:15
2016	World Half Marathon Championships	Cardiff, United Kingdom	2nd	Team	3:26:29

== Circuit wins ==
- Egmond Half Marathon: 2016
- Tilburg 10K: 2015
- Jan Meda Cross Country: 2014
- Obudu Ranch International Mountain Race: 2011

== Personal bests ==
- 3000 metres – 9:01.75 min (2010)
- 5000 metres – 14:48.43 min (2012)
- 10,000 metres – 31:08.82 min (2015)
- 10 kilometres – 30:58 min (2015)
- Half marathon – 66:26 min (2016)
