= Haftamnesh Tesfay =

Ethiopian distance runner

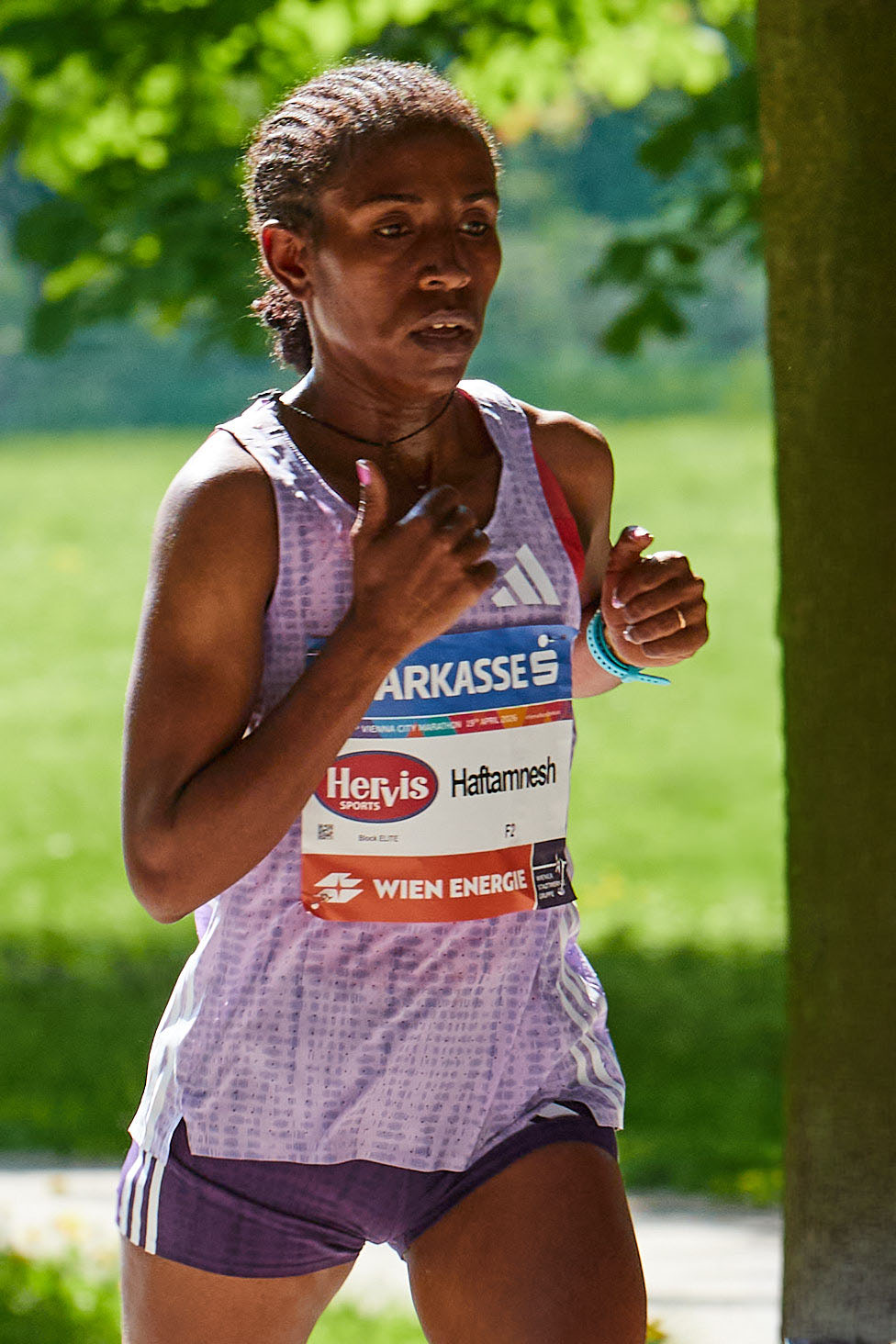
- Haftamnesh Tesfaye at the Vienna City Marathon 2026

Personal information
- Full name: Haftamnesh Tesfay Haylu
- Nationality: Ethiopian
- Born: April 28, 1994 (age 32)
- Height: 162 cm (5 ft 4 in)
- Weight: 48 kg (106 lb)

Sport
- Sport: Athletics
- Events: Marathon, 5000 metres

Achievements and titles
- Personal bests: Marathon: 2:20:13 (2018); 5000m: 15:10.85 (2016)
Medal record
Women's athletics
Representing Ethiopia
African U20 Championships
Gold medal – first place	2013 Bambous	3000 m

Haftamnesh Tesfay Haylu (also spelled Haftanmesh Tesfaye; born 28 April 1994) is an Ethiopian distance runner and winner of the 2013 African Junior Athletics Championships in the 3000 metres.

== Biography ==
Tesfay's first international competition was the 2012 IAAF World Junior Championships in Athletics, where she finished 4th in the women's 3000 metres run.

In 2013, Tesfay won the African Junior Championships title in the 3000m with a time of 9:32.3. Later that year, she beat Ruti Aga to win the Ethiopian Clubs Cross Champs.

In 2015, Tesfay moved up in distance at the 2015 African Games, where she finished 6th in the 5000 metres. She would move further up to the 10,000 metres distance in 2018, with a 7th place showing at the African Championships.

In January 2018, Tesfay made her marathon debut at the Dubai Marathon, where she finished 5th in a time of 2:20:13, which at the time was the 4th fastest marathon debut in history.

== Statistics ==
=== Personal bests ===
Event	Mark	Competition	Venue	Date
Marathon	2:19:17	Ljubljana Marathon	Ljubljana, Slovenia	18 October 2026
5000 metres	15:10.85	Fanny Blankers-Koen Games	Hengelo	22 May 2016
