= Toroitich =

Toroitich is a surname. Notable people with the surname include:

- Alexander Toroitich Kiprotich (born 1994), Kenyan javelin thrower
- Boniface Toroitich Kiprop (born 1985), Ugandan long-distance runner
- Daniel Toroitich arap Moi (1924–2020), President of Kenya from 1978 to 2002
- Linet Toroitich Chebet (born 1992), Ugandan long-distance runner
- Martin Toroitich (born 1983), Ugandan long-distance runner
- Timothy Toroitich (born 1991), Ugandan runner
