= Barkahoum Drici =

Algerian long-distance runner

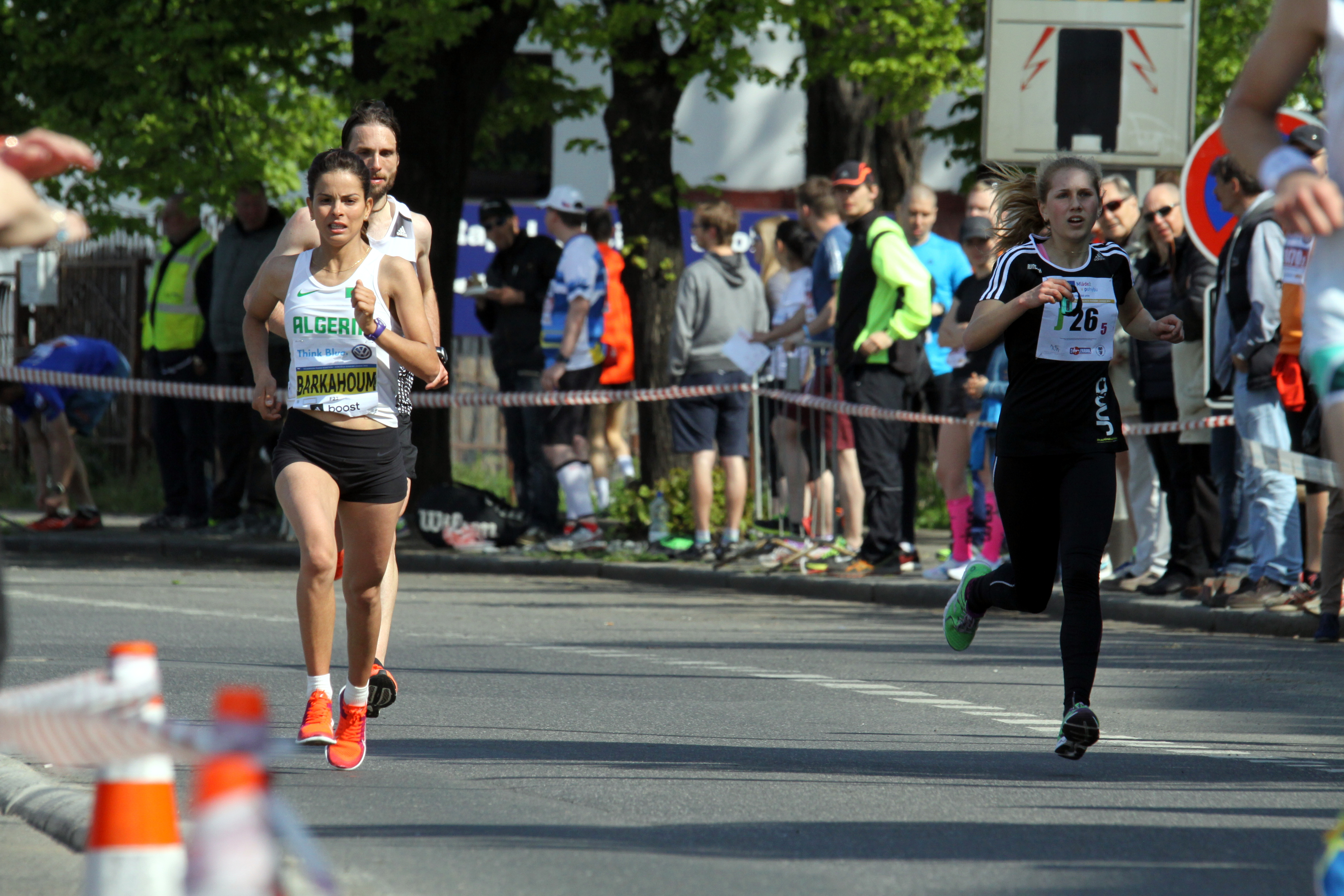
- Drici during the 2015 Prague Marathon

Personal information
- Born: 28 March 1989 (age 37)

Sport
- Country: Algeria
- Sport: Track and field Cross-country running
- Event: long-distance running

Barkahoum Drici (born 28 March 1989) is a female Algerian former long-distance runner and cross country runner. She is two times national champion in the 5000 metres. She represented Algeria in both cross-country and in the marathon the World Championships.

== Career ==
Drici made her international debut a junior athlete at the junior women's race at the 2007 IAAF World Cross Country Championships in Mombasa, Kenya. In the same year she improved the national record (under-20) in the 10000 metres to 36:14.95. In 2008 she again represented Algeria in the junior women's race at the 2008 IAAF World Cross Country Championships in Edinburgh, United Kingdom.

As a senior, Drici became national champion in the 5000 metres in 2010 and 2012, winning in 2012 in a new personal record of 16:39.30.

In 2015 she won the women's national title at the 29th edition of the Challenge national "Chelda Boulenouar" in Tlemcen. She that year also qualified for the women's race of the 2015 IAAF World Cross Country Championships in Guiyang, China.

In the marathon she ran her personal best in a time of 2:42.11 during the 2015 Prague Marathon. With that time she qualified for the marathon event at the 2015 World Championships in Athletics in Beijing, China. She had to abandon the race halfway. She didn't give in the hours after the race a reason for her dropout.

== See also ==
- Algeria at the 2015 World Championships in Athletics
