= Elaina Tabb =

American long-distance runner

Personal information
- Nationality: American
- Born: Elaina Balouris; December 17, 1991 (age 34) Pittsburgh, Pennsylvania
- Height: 5 ft 8 in (1.73 m)

Sport
- Country: United States
- Sport: Track & Field
- Event: 5000 meters 10,000 meters
- College team: College of William & Mary
- Club: Boston Athletic Association; Adidas
- Turned pro: 2014
- Coached by: Terrence Mahon
Medal record
Women's Athletics
Representing United States
World Cross Country
2017 Kampala, Uganda	10,000 m
2015 Guiyang, China	8,000 m
World Half Marathon
2018 Valencia	Half Marathon

Elaina Tabb (née Balouris, b. Dec. 17, 1991) is an American long-distance runner from Pittsburgh, Pennsylvania. Tabb trains in Boston, Massachusetts.

== Professional ==
Tabb runs professionally for the Boston Athletic Association that is supported by Adidas since 2014.

She placed 17th in a time of 1:12:29 at 2018 Aramco Half Marathon in Houston, qualified to represent Team USA at 2018 IAAF World Half Marathon Championships and placed 64th.

In December, Tabb placed 7th at 2017 USATF National Club Cross Country Championships in Lexington, Kentucky in a time of 20:01.0. In May, she ran 10,000 m at 2017 Payton Jordan Invite in 32:34.73 and qualified to 2017 USA Outdoor Track and Field Championships where she finished 9th in 10,000 meters in a time of 32:48.76. In February, she placed 6th at 2017 USA Cross Country Championships in Bend, Oregon in 36:18.3 and qualified to 2017 IAAF World Cross Country Championships in March in Kampala, Uganda where she placed 46th in 36:26. In March, she placed 10th at the USATF 15 km road championship in Jacksonville, Florida in 51:49.

On June 11, 2016, at the Portland Track Festival - Tabb finished 6th in 32:27.28 at 10 km. Tabb finished in seventh place in 19:52 at the 2016 USA Club Cross Country Championships in Tallahassee, Florida.

Tabb qualified for the 2015 IAAF World Cross Country Championships by finishing in sixth place (the final world team qualifying spot) at the 2015 USA Cross Country Championships. At those world championships she finished in 64th place.

Tabb finished 14th in 32:39 at 2014 Tufts 10 km.

=== International ===
Year	Competition	Venue	Position	Event	Notes
2018	IAAF World Half Marathon Championships	Valencia, Spain	64th	Senior race	1:14:55
2017	IAAF World Cross Country Championships	Kampala, Uganda	48th	Senior race	36:26
2015	IAAF World Cross Country Championships	Guiyang, China	64th	Senior race	30:14

=== USA National Championships ===
==== Cross country ====
Year	Competition	Venue	Position	Event	Notes
2017	USATF National Club Cross Country Championships	Lexington, Kentucky	7th	Open race	20:01.0
2017	USA Cross Country Championships	Bend, Oregon	6th	Senior race	36:18.3
2016	USATF National Club Cross Country Championships	Tallahassee, Florida	7th	Open race	19:52
2015	USA Cross Country Championships	Boulder, Colorado	6th	Senior race	28:29

==== Track and field ====
Year	Competition	Venue	Position	Event	Notes
2017	USA Outdoor Track and Field Championships	Sacramento, California	9th	10,000 meters	32:48.76
2015	USA Outdoor Track and Field Championships	Eugene, Oregon	13th	10,000 meters	34:03.72

Elaina Balouris represented Boston Athletic Association at the 10,000 meter Final at the 2015 USATF Outdoor championships. Elaina Balouris placed 13th at 2015 USA Outdoor Track and Field Championships in 34:03.72.

==== Road ====
Year	Competition	Venue	Position	Event	Notes
2014	USA 5 km Championships	Providence, Rhode Island	14th	5 km race	16:15
2014	USA 12 km Championships	Alexandria, Virginia	5th	12 km race	39:02
2015	USA 5 km Championships	Providence, Rhode Island	7th	5 km race	16:07
2016	Falmouth Road Race	Falmouth, Massachusetts	8th	11 km race	38:45
2017	Gate River Run	Jacksonville, Florida	10th	15 km race	51:49

== College ==
In college, Balouris competed for the College of William & Mary where she was a six-time All-American.

Year	Competition	Event	Time	Place
2014	NCAA Division I Outdoor Track & Field Championships	10,000	32:46.57	5th
2014	ECAC-IC4A Outdoor Championships	3000	9:10.41	1
2014	CAA Track and Field Championships	5000	16:30.62	2
2014	CAA Track and Field Championships	1500	4:24.27	2
2014	CAA Track and Field Championships	1500	4:36.68	3
2014	NCAA Division I Indoor Track & Field Championships	5000	17:05.30	14
2013	NCAA Division I Cross Country Championships	XC 6K	20:22.6	11
2013	2013 CAA Cross Country Championships	XC 6K	21:17.1	1
2013	NCAA Division I National Championships	10,000	34:13.53	10
2013	CAA Outdoor Track & Field Championships	1500	4:29.25	2
2013	CAA Outdoor Track & Field Championships	5000	16:34.11	2
2013	IC4A/ECAC DI Indoor Track & Field Championships	3000	9:42.18	4
2012	2012 NCAA Division I Cross Country Championships	XC 6K	19:56.0	13
2012	Colonial Athletic Association Championships	XC 6K	20:43.1	1
2012	NCAA Division I Championships	10,000	34:41.97	19
2012	CAA Championships	10,000	35:57.92	1
2012	ECAC DI Indoor Track and Field Championships	5000	17:11.46	8
2011	CAA Track & Field Championships	5000	16:59.45	2
