= Emily Brichacek =

Australian long-distance runner

Personal information
- Born: 7 July 1990 (age 35) Canberra, Australia

Sport
- Country: Australia
- Sport: Long-distance running
Medal record
Women's athletics
Representing Australia
Oceania Athletics Championships
| Bronze medal – third place | 2019 Townsville | 10,000 m |

Emily Brichacek (born 7 July 1990) is an Australian long-distance runner. She competed in the senior women's race at the 2019 IAAF World Cross Country Championships held in Aarhus, Denmark. She finished in 35th place.

In 2014, she represented Australia at the Commonwealth Games in the women's 5000 metres event. She finished in 7th place.

She competed in the senior women's race at the 2015 IAAF World Cross Country Championships held in Guiyang, China. She finished in 61st place.
