= 2018 African Championships in Athletics – Women's 5000 metres =

The women's 5000 metres event at the 2018 African Championships in Athletics was held on 2 August in Asaba, Nigeria.

== Results ==
Rank	Athlete	Nationality	Time	Notes
1st place, gold medalist(s)	Hellen Obiri	Kenya	15:47.18	
2nd place, silver medalist(s)	Senbere Teferi	Ethiopia	15:54.48	
3rd place, bronze medalist(s)	Meskerem Mamo	Ethiopia	15:57.38	
4	Hawi Feysa	Ethiopia	15:59.23	
5	Lilian Kasait Rengeruk	Kenya	16:04.51	
6	Loice Chemnung	Kenya	16:25.78	
7	Dolchi Tesfu	Eritrea	16:46.94	
8	Aminat Olowora	Nigeria	17:29.64	
	Kaoutar Farkoussi	Morocco	DNF	
	Kyondwa Katapala	Democratic Republic of the Congo	DNS	
	Failuna Matanga	Tanzania	DNS	
	Cavaline Nahimana	Burundi	DNS	
