= 2018 African Championships in Athletics – Women's 10,000 metres =

The women's 10,000 metres event at the 2018 African Championships in Athletics was held on 4 August in Asaba, Nigeria.

== Results ==
Rank	Athlete	Nationality	Time	Notes
1st place, gold medalist(s)	Stacy Ndiwa	Kenya	31:31.17	
2nd place, silver medalist(s)	Alice Aprot Nawowuna	Kenya	31:36.12	
3rd place, bronze medalist(s)	Gete Alemayehu	Ethiopia	32:10.68	
4	Stella Chesang	Uganda	32:29.54	
5	Mercyline Chelangat	Uganda	32:36.39	
6	Salome Nyirarukundo	Rwanda	33:14.08	
7	Haftamnesh Tesfay	Ethiopia	33:44.92	
8	Fanus Alem	Eritrea	34:48.09	
	Paule-Marie Perrier	Mauritius	DNF	
	Pauline Korikwiang	Kenya	DNF	
	Asnakech Awoke	Ethiopia	DNF	
	Elvanie Nimbona	Burundi	DNS	
	Failuna Matanga	Tanzania	DNS	
