= Meskerem Mamo =

Ethiopian middle-distance runner

Personal information
- Full name: Meskerem Mamo Haile
- Nationality: Ethiopian
- Born: 13 April 1999 (age 27)

Sport
- Sport: Athletics
- Event(s): 5000 metres, 3000 metres

Achievements and titles
- Personal bests: 5000m: 14:36.89 (2021); 3000m: 8:33.63 NJR (2018)
Medal record
Women's athletics
Representing Ethiopia
African Championships
Bronze medal – third place	2018 Asaba	5000 m
African U20 Championships
Gold medal – first place	2017 Tlemcen	5000 m

Meskerem Mamo Haile (born 13 April 1999) is an Ethiopian middle-distance runner. She was the 2017 African U20 Championships gold medalist in the 5000 metres, and she was the Ethiopian U20 record holder in the women's 3000 metres from 2018 to 2023.

== Biography ==
Meskerem's first international medal came at the 2017 African U20 Championships, where she won the title over 3000 m runner-up Sandra Chebet.

The following year at the 2018 Diamond League season opener in Doha, she ran a time of 8:33.63 for 3000 metres. It stood as an Ethiopian U20 record until it was broken by Aynadis Mebratu with a time of 8:30.99 in September 2023. Later that year she won the bronze medal at the 2018 African Championships in Athletics in the 5000 m.

In 2018, Meskerem was selected as a finalist for the IAAF World Athlete of the Year Rising Star award. She was one of two Ethiopians nominated for the award, which was won by Sydney McLaughlin.

In 2019, Meskerem won the women's Northern Ireland International Cross Country race by less than a second. She out-sprinted Hawi Feysa for the title to win by one metre, but both athletes were credited with a 26:10 final time.

== Statistics ==
=== Personal bests ===
Event	Mark	Competition	Venue	Date
3000 metres	8:33.63 NU20R	Doha Diamond League	Doha, Qatar	4 May 2018
5000 metres	14:36.89	Ethiopian Olympic Trials	Hengelo, Netherlands	8 June 2021
