= Yebrgual Melese =

Ethiopian track and field athlete (1990–2026)

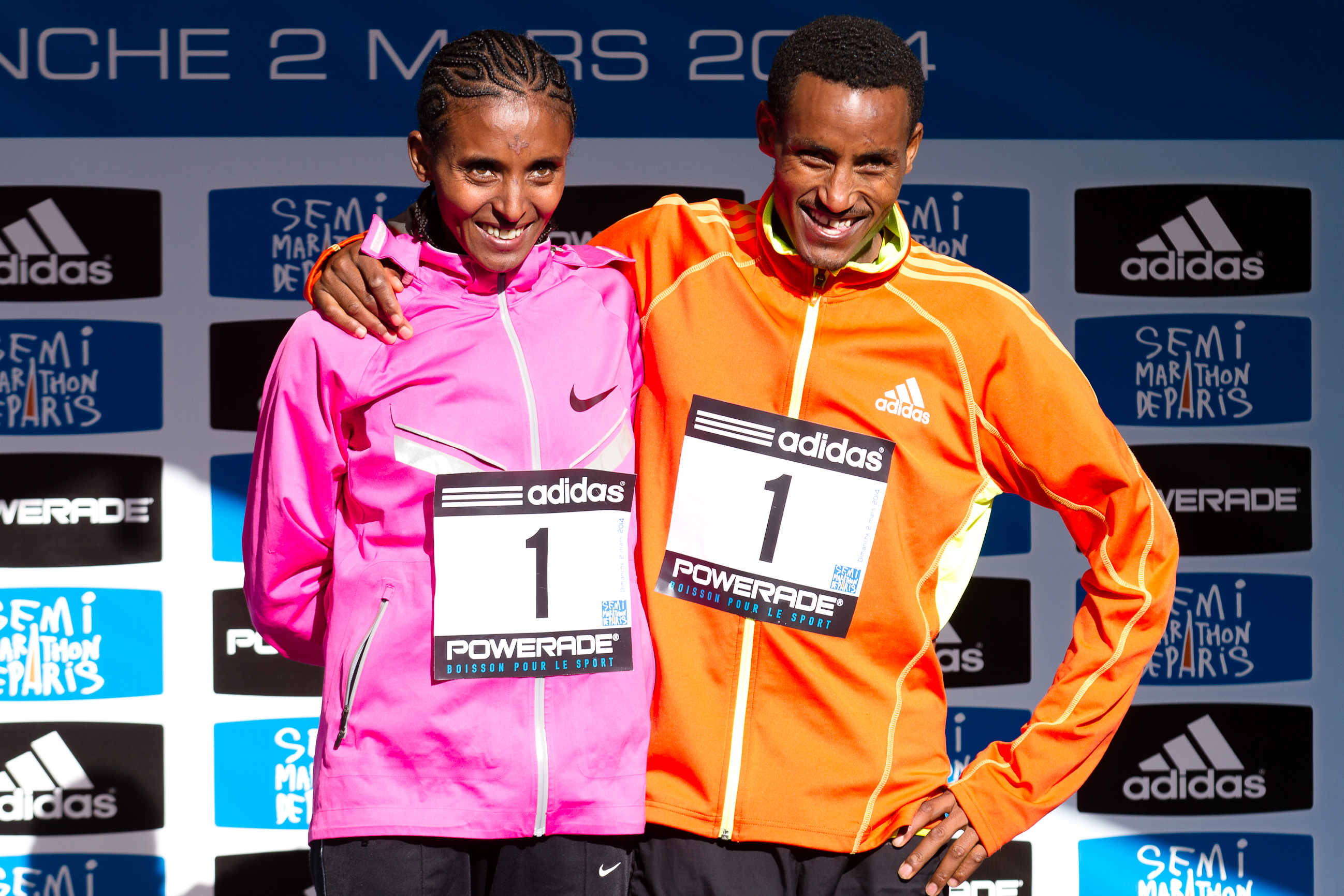
- Melese (left) in 2014

Personal information
- Born: Yebrgual Melese; 18 April 1990 Addis Ababa, Ethiopia
- Died: 12 May 2026 (aged 36) Addis Ababa, Ethiopia
- Height: 1.60 m (5 ft 3 in)
- Weight: 48 kg (106 lb)

Sport
- Country: Ethiopia
- Sport: Athletics
- Events: 10,000 metres, Marathon
- Turned pro: 2011

Achievements and titles
- National finals: Ethiopian Athletics Federation; 2013: 1st, 10,000 m
Medal record
Women's athletics
Representing Ethiopia
All-Africa Games
Bronze medal – third place	2015 Brazzaville	Half marathon
World Marathon Majors
Silver medal – second place	2015 Chicago	Marathon

Yebrgual Melese Arage (born Yebrgual Melese; Amharic: የብርጓል መለሰ; 18 April 1990 – 12 May 2026) was an Ethiopian long-distance runner. She placed second at the 2015 Chicago Marathon, 2017 Frankfurt Marathon in 2:24:30, and 2025 Barcelona Marathon in 2:20:47. Melese won 2019 Shanghai International Marathon in 2:23:19 and the 2018 Shanghai International Marathon in 2:20:36.

Melese died on 12 May 2026, at the age of 36, after collapsing during a training session.

== Career ==
At the 43rd Chevron Houston Marathon in 2016, Melese ran the second-fastest time ever by a woman in Houston.

Melese smashed the course record at the 19th edition of the Shanghai International Marathon in 2018.

Year	Competition	Venue	Position	Event	Notes
10 kilometres
2011	Ethiopian Athletics Federation; Track and Field Championships	Addis Ababa, Ethiopia	6th	10 km	33:35.49
2011	France Clermont-Ferrand Road 10 km	Clermont-Ferrand, France	3rd	10 km	32:54
2013	Ethiopian Athletics Federation; Track and Field Championships	Addis Ababa, Ethiopia	1st	10 km	33:32.63
2013	Peachtree Road Race	Atlanta, GA, United States	3rd	10 km	32:16
2013	Beach to Beacon 10K	Cape Elizabeth, ME, United States	4th	10 km	31:40
2015	Great Ethiopian Run	Addis Ababa, Ethiopia	2nd	10 km	33:11
Representing Ethiopia
2013	World Cross Country Championships	Bydgoszcz, Poland	29th	8 km	25:44
2015	All-Africa Games	Brazzaville, Congo	3rd	Half marathon	1:12:42
Marathons representing Nike
2014	Dubai Standard Chartered Marathon	Dubai, United Arab Emirates	13th	Marathon	2:29:46
2014	Paris Marathon	Paris, France	2nd	Marathon	2:26:21
2014	Gold Coast Airport Marathon	Gold Coast, Australia	4th	Marathon	2:32:49
2015	Houston Marathon	Houston, TX, United States	1st	Marathon	2:23:23
2015	Prague Marathon	Prague, Czech Republic	1st	Marathon	2:23:49
2015	Chicago Marathon	Chicago, IL, United States	2nd	Marathon	2:23:43
2016	Paris Marathon	Paris, France	5th	Marathon	2:32:06
2016	Chicago Marathon	Chicago, IL, United States	5th	Marathon	2:24:49
2017	Dubai Standard Chartered Marathon	Dubai, United Arab Emirates	3rd	Marathon	2:23:13
2017	Paris Marathon	Paris, France	5th	Marathon	2:22:51
2017	Frankfurt Marathon	Frankfurt am Main, Germany	2nd	Marathon	2:24:30
2018	Dubai Standard Chartered Marathon	Dubai, United Arab Emirates	3rd	Marathon	2:19:36
2018	Dongying Yellow River Marathon	Dongying, China	2nd	Marathon	2:27:47
2018	Shanghai International Marathon	Shanghai, China	1st	Marathon	2:20:36 CR
Half marathons representing Nike
2014	Paris Half Marathon	Paris, France	1st	Half marathon	1:09:23
2015	Paris Half Marathon	Paris, France	1st	Half marathon	1:09:54
2015	Prague Half Marathon	Prague, Czech Republic	2nd	Half marathon	1:08:21
2018	Portugal Half Marathon	Lisbon, Portugal	1st	Half marathon	1:07:18 CR

== Personal bests ==
Distance	Performance	Location	Date	Notes
10,000 m	32:38	Appingedam, Netherlands	30 June 2012	
Half marathon	1:07:18	Lisbon, Portugal	14 October 2018	
Marathon	2:19:36	Dubai, United Arab Emirates	26 January 2018	

== Personal life ==
Melese is survived by her husband, and two children.
