= Senbere Teferi =

Ethiopian runner

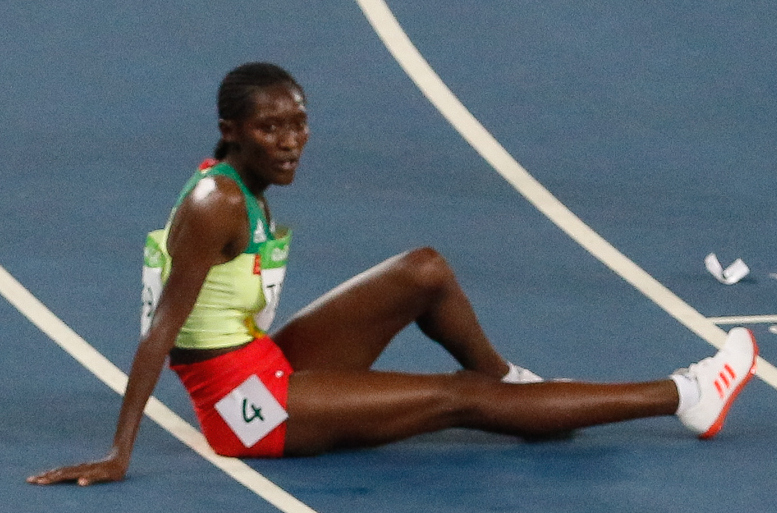
- Teferi at the 2016 Rio Olympics

Personal information
- Born: Senbere Teferi Sora; 3 May 1995 (age 31) Jigjiga, Ethiopia

Sport
- Country: Ethiopia
- Sport: Athletics
- Events: Middle-, Long-distance running

Achievements and titles
- Personal bests: 1500 m: 4:01.86 (Doha 2015); 3000 m: 8:32.49 (Ostrava 2018); 5000 m: 14:15.24 (Hengelo 2021); 10,000 m: 30:40.59 (Hengelo 2016); Road; 5 km: 14:29 WR (Herzogenaurach 2021); 10 km: 30:38 (Tilburg 2017); 10 miles: 52:51 (Portsmouth 2016); Half marathon: 1:05:32 (Valencia 2019); Marathon: 2:24:11 (Dubai 2018)
Medal record
Representing Ethiopia
World Championships
| Silver medal – second place | 2015 Beijing | 5000 m |
World Cross Country Championships
| Gold medal – first place | 2015 Guiyang | Senior team |
African Championships
| Silver medal – second place | 2018 Asaba | 5000 m |
World U20 Championships
| Bronze medal – third place | 2012 Barcelona | 1500 m |
World U18 Championships
| Silver medal – second place | 2011 Villeneuve-d'Ascq | 1500 m |
| Silver medal – second place | 2015 Guiyang | Senior race |
Representing Africa
Continental Cup
| Silver medal – second place | 2018 Ostrava | 3000 m |

Senbere Teferi (born 3 May 1995) is an Ethiopian professional middle- and long-distance runner. She won the silver medal in the 5000 metres at the 2015 World Championships in Athletics. Teferi was also the silver medallist at the 2015 World Cross Country Championships. She is the world record holder for the women's only 5 kilometres road race.

At age 16, Teferi earned silver in the 1500 metres at the 2011 World Under-18 Championships to take bronze at the U20 edition the following year.

== Career ==
Born Senbere Teferi Sora, she won her first international medal at the 2011 World Youth Championships in Athletics, placing second in the 1500 m to Kenya's Faith Kipyegon. She rose to the top of the national scene with a 1500 m win at the Ethiopian Athletics Championships. She took a prominent scalp in the form of Tiki Gelana at the Women First 5K in Addis Ababa in March 2012. At the 2012 World Junior Championships in Athletics she achieved a personal best of 4:08.28 minutes in the 1500 m final, but was again defeated by Kipyegon and also by Amela Terzić, leaving her with the junior bronze.

Senbere opened the 2013 season with a win at the national junior championships, taking the 3000 metres by a margin of nearly seven seconds. At the senior Ethiopian championships she made her debut over the 5000 metres and held off competition from Alemitu Heroye to lift her second national title. She began to move into cross country running at the end of the year and placed third in the junior section of the Ethiopian Clubs Cross Country Championships. The following year, she was among the favourites for the 2014 World Junior Championships in Athletics after a world-leading junior time of 8:41.54 minutes in the 3000 m at the Doha Diamond League, but ultimately did not compete. She scored an African junior record in the 2000 metres at the Golden Spike Ostrava meeting with a time of 5:34.27 minutes, finishing behind Genzebe Dibaba who was making an attempt at the world record.

Cross country was her focus after the track season. She won the Cross de l'Acier in France in November 2014. She was chosen for the senior Ethiopian team for the 2015 IAAF World Cross Country Championships and, in spite of her suffering an injury in the week before the event, she took to the front pack alongside Agnes Jebet Tirop and the two became the race protagonists, with Tirop eventually beating Senbere in the final 200 m, leaving the Ethiopian with the silver medal. Senbere's senior debut also saw her head the Ethiopian women to the team title, helped by her compatriot (and bronze medallist) Netsanet Gudeta.

== Achievements ==
=== International competitions ===
| Year | Competition | Venue | Position | Event | Result |
Representing Ethiopia
| 2011 | World Youth Championships | Lille, France | 2nd | 1500 m | 4:10.54 PB |
| 2012 | World Junior Championships | Barcelona, Spain | 3rd | 1500 m | 4:08.28 PB |
| 2013 | World Championships | Moscow, Russia | 30th (h) | 1500 m | 4:11.41 |
| 2015 | World Cross Country Championships | Guiyang, China | 2nd | Senior race | 26:06 |
| 2015 | World Cross Country Championships | Guiyang, China | 1st | Senior team | 17 pts |
| 2015 | World Championships | Beijing, China | 2nd | 5000 m | 14:44.07 |
| 2016 | Olympic Games | Rio de Janeiro, Brazil | 5th | 5000 m | 14:43.75 |
| 2017 | World Championships | London, United Kingdom | 4th | 5000 m | 14:47.45 |
| 2018 | African Championships | Asaba, Nigeria | 2nd | 5000 m | 15:54.48 |
| 2018 | Continental Cup | Ostrava, Czech Republic | 2nd | 3000 m | 8:32.49 PB |
| 2019 | World Championships | Doha, Qatar | 6th | 10,000 m | 30:44.23 SB |
| 2021 | Olympic Games | Tokyo, Japan | 6th | 5000 m | 14:54.39 |
World Marathon Majors
| 2022 | New York City Marathon | New York, NY, United States | – | Marathon | DNF |
| 2024 | New York City Marathon | New York, NY, United States | 7th | Marathon | 2:27:14 |

=== National titles ===
- Ethiopian Athletics Championships
  - 5000 metres: 2013, 2017
