= 2014 African Championships in Athletics – Women's 10,000 metres =

The women's 10,000 metres event at the 2014 African Championships in Athletics was held on August 13 on Stade de Marrakech.

== Results ==
Rank	Name	Nationality	Time	Notes
1st place, gold medalist(s)	Joyce Chepkirui	Kenya	32:45.27	
2nd place, silver medalist(s)	Emily Chebet	Kenya	32:45.28	
3rd place, bronze medalist(s)	Belaynesh Oljira	Ethiopia	32:49.39	
4	Genet Yalew	Ethiopia	32:52.46	
5	Tigist Abayechew	Ethiopia	34:21.12	
	Khadija Sammah	Morocco	DNF	
	Florence Kiplagat	Kenya	DNS	
	Juliet Chekwel	Uganda	DNS	
