= Tasmin McMahon =

Australian long-distance runner

Personal information
- Born: 6 April 1993 (age 32)

Sport
- Country: Australia
- Event: Long-distance running

Tasmin McMahon (born 6 April 1993) is an Australian long-distance runner.

In 2013, she competed in the senior women's race at the 2013 IAAF World Cross Country Championships held in Bydgoszcz, Poland. She finished in 78th place.
