= 2025 Berlin Marathon =

42.195 km (26.2 mi) race in Germany

51st Berlin Marathon
- Location: Berlin, Germany
- Dates: 21 September 2025
- Website: https://www.bmw-berlin-marathon.com

Champions
- Men: Sabastian Sawe (2:02:16)
- Women: Rosemary Wanjiru (2:21:05)
- Wheelchair men: Marcel Hug (1:17:30)
- Wheelchair women: Manuela Schär (1:35:08)

The 2025 Berlin Marathon was the 51st edition of the annual marathon race in Berlin, held on Sunday, September 21, 2025. A Platinum Label marathon, it was one of the six World Marathon Majors events scheduled for 2025.

Kenyan runner Sabastian Sawe won the men's race with a world-leading time of 2:02:16. Fellow Kenyan runner Rosemary Wanjiru won the women's race with a time of 2:21:05. Swiss wheelchair athletes Marcel Hug and Manuela Schär won their respective races. This was Hug's tenth and Schär's seventh win at the Berlin Marathon.

== Competitors ==
The elite field for the 2025 edition was noted for its depth. The men's race featured defending champion Milkesa Mengesha, but the favorite was Sabastian Sawe, who had a phenomenal start to his marathon career with two wins in two major races. Despite very warm conditions, Sawe ran a solo race for the final 17 kilometers to secure the victory.

The women's elite field was headlined by Rosemary Wanjiru, who had an impressive debut at the Berlin Marathon in 2022. Wanjiru won after a dramatic finish, holding off a late surge from Ethiopian runner Dera Dida to win by three seconds. The race also featured both Japanese national record holders, Kengo Suzuki and Honami Maeda, a rare occurrence for a marathon outside of Japan.

== Results ==
Results for the top ten in the running races and top six in the wheelchair races are listed below.

Men's race result
Position	Athlete	Nationality	Time
1st place, gold medalist(s)	Sabastian Sawe	Kenya	2:02:16
2nd place, silver medalist(s)	Akira Akasaki	Japan	2:06:15
3rd place, bronze medalist(s)	Chimdessa Debele	Ethiopia	2:06:57
4	Guye Adola	Ethiopia	2:07:11
5	Yuhei Urano	Japan	2:07:35
6	Hassan Chahdi	France	2:07:43
7	Shin Kimura	Japan	2:08:37
8	Hendrik Pfeiffer	Germany	2:09:14
9	Joseph Tiophil Panga	Tanzania	2:09:35
10	Ahmed Ouhda	Italy	2:10:39

Women's race result
Position	Athlete	Nationality	Time
1st place, gold medalist(s)	Rosemary Wanjiru	Kenya	2:21:05
2nd place, silver medalist(s)	Dera Dida	Ethiopia	2:21:08
3rd place, bronze medalist(s)	Azmera Gebru	Ethiopia	2:21:29
4	Violah Cheptoo	Kenya	2:21:40
5	Fantu Worku	Ethiopia	2:21:57
6	Fabienne Königstein	Germany	2:22:17
7	Degitu Azimeraw	Ethiopia	2:23:02
8	Domenika Mayer	Germany	2:23:16
9	Honami Maeda	Japan	2:24:36
10	Mestawut Fikir	Ethiopia	2:24:52

Wheelchair men's race result
Position	Athlete	Nationality	Time
1st place, gold medalist(s)	Marcel Hug	Switzerland	1:17:30
2nd place, silver medalist(s)	David Weir	United Kingdom	1:23:13
3rd place, bronze medalist(s)	Geert Schipper	Netherlands	1:24:14
4	Jetze Plat	Netherlands	1:24:14
5	Hiroki Nishida	Japan	1:24:14
6	Ludwig Malter	Austria	1:24:15

Wheelchair women's race result
Position	Athlete	Nationality	Time
1st place, gold medalist(s)	Manuela Schär	Switzerland	1:35:08
2nd place, silver medalist(s)	Jade Hall	United Kingdom	1:40:18
3rd place, bronze medalist(s)	Eden Rainbow-Cooper	United Kingdom	1:40:19
4	Tatyana McFadden	United States	1:40:22
5	Patricia Eachus	Switzerland	1:47:25
6	Vanessa De Souza	Brazil	1:47:29

== See also ==
- World Marathon Majors
- List of marathon races
- List of World Athletics Label marathon races
