= Athletics at the 2015 African Games – Women's half marathon =

The women's half marathon event at the 2015 African Games was held on 17 September.

== Results ==
Rank	Name	Nationality	Time	Notes
1st place, gold medalist(s)	Mamitu Daska	Ethiopia	1:12:42	
2nd place, silver medalist(s)	Worknesh Degefa	Ethiopia	1:12:42	
3rd place, bronze medalist(s)	Yebergal Melese	Ethiopia	1:12:42	
4	Kokob Tesfagabriel	Eritrea	1:16:35	
5	Anna Amutoku	Namibia	1:16:45	
6	Janet Rono	Kenya	1:17:02	
7	Jane Moraa	Kenya	1:18:09	
8	Ntebaleng Letsela	Lesotho	1:18:27	SB
9	Chaka Lineo	Lesotho	1:19:12	SB
10	Constance Nyasango	Zimbabwe	1:19:29	
11	Yublime Jod Ossou Wakeyi	Republic of the Congo	1:19:47	
12	Hibret Debesay	Eritrea	1:20:35	
13	Malkik Safa	Sudan	1:25:24	
14	Balkissa Abdoulaye	Niger	1:27:57	NR
	Clene Mambeke	Republic of the Congo	DNF	
	Nina Ines Ombanda	Republic of the Congo	DNF	
	Grace Kimanzi	Kenya	DNF	
