= 2011 World Youth Championships in Athletics – Girls' 1500 metres =

Girls' 1500 metres at the 2011 World Youth Championships in Athletics
- Venue: Stadium Lille Métropole
- Dates: 6 July (heats); 9 July (final)
- Competitors: 22
- Winning time: 4:09.48 CR

Medalists
gold medal	Faith Kipyegon	Kenya
silver medal	Senbere Teferi	Ethiopia
bronze medal	Genet Tibieso	Ethiopia

The girls' 1500 metres at the 2011 World Youth Championships in Athletics was held at the Stadium Lille Métropole on 6 and 9 July.

== Medalists ==
Gold	Silver	Bronze
Faith Kipyegon; Kenya	Senbere Teferi; Ethiopia	Genet Tibieso; Ethiopia

== Records ==
Prior to the competition, the following records were as follows.

World Youth Best	Zhang Ling (CHN)	3:54.52	Shanghai, China	18 October 1997
Championship Record	Sheila Chepkirui (KEN)	4:12.29	Marrakesh, Morocco	15 July 2005
World Youth Leading	Genet Tibieso (ETH)	4:12.50	Brazzaville, Republic of the Congo	12 June 2011

== Heats ==
Qualification rule: first 4 of each heat (Q) plus the 4 fastest times (q) qualified.

=== Heat 1 ===
Rank	Lane	Name	Nationality	Time	Notes
1	2	Senbere Teferi	Ethiopia	4:21.44	Q
2	3	Sheila Chepngetich Keter	Kenya	4:25.03	Q
3	7	Hannah Meier	United States	4:25.28	Q
4	11	Anna Laman	Australia	4:25.53	Q
5	5	Maya Rehberg	Germany	4:25.70	q
6	8	Shiho Takada	Japan	4:25.89	q
7	9	Lenuta Simiuc	Romania	4:32.47	
8	1	Jaimie Phelan	Canada	4:33.28	
9	10	Emine Hatun Tuna	Turkey	4:34.91	
10	6	Margot Gibson	New Zealand	4:34.96	
11	4	Kelly Hennessy	Canada	4:46.49	

=== Heat 2 ===
Rank	Lane	Name	Nationality	Time	Notes
1	6	Faith Kipyegon	Kenya	4:16.95	Q, PB
2	5	Genet Tibieso	Ethiopia	4:17.68	Q
3	1	Georgia Peel	Great Britain	4:19.14	Q
4	9	Yui Fukuda	Japan	4:21.76	Q
5	7	Katelyn Simpson	Australia	4:22.27	q
6	3	Camille Chapus	United States	4:22.69	q, PB
7	10	Prescilia Duponcheel	France	4:26.26	PB
8	4	Yohana Zemuy	Eritrea	4:27.71	PB
9	11	Frida Berge	Norway	4:31.61	
10	8	Meropi Panagiotou	Cyprus	4:32.82	
11	2	Kriszta Kószás	Hungary	4:46.66	

== Final ==
Rank	Lane	Name	Nationality	Time	Notes
1st place, gold medalist(s)	6	Faith Kipyegon	Kenya	4:09.48	CR
2nd place, silver medalist(s)	12	Senbere Teferi	Ethiopia	4:10.54	PB
3rd place, bronze medalist(s)	8	Genet Tibieso	Ethiopia	4:11.56	PB
4	10	Georgia Peel	Great Britain	4:16.36	SB
5	4	Camille Chapus	United States	4:17.12	PB
6	2	Sheila Chepngetich Keter	Kenya	4:17.34	
7	9	Yui Fukuda	Japan	4:19.27	
8	11	Shiho Takeda	Japan	4:20.62	PB
9	5	Hannah Meier	United States	4:20.65	PB
10	3	Katelyn Simpson	Australia	4:20.75	PB
11	7	Anna Laman	Australia	4:21.06	
12	1	Maya Rehberg	Germany	4:23.70	PB
