= Charlie Hulson =

British athlete (born 1993)

Personal information
- Nationality: British
- Born: 7 March 1993 (age 33) St Asaph, Wales
- Occupation: Runner

Sport
- Sport: Long-distance running
- Events: 5000 m, 10,000 m, cross country, marathon, half marathon
- Club: Liverpool Harriers and Athletic Club, Liverpool

Achievements and titles
- Personal bests: 5,000 m – 13:43.35 (2016); 10,000 m – 29:12:00 (2018); Marathon – 2:13:34 (2020).

Charlie Hulson (born 7 March 1993) is a British athlete and senior professional marathon runner, most recently noted to achieve a Personal Best marathon time of 2:13:34. at the Virgin Money London Elite Marathon, 4 October 2020. He finished 20th, fifth British runner.

He has represented Great Britain at the 2015 IAAF World Cross Country Championships and at the European Cross Country Championships on four occasions (2012, 2013, 2014 and 2018).

== Career ==
Hulson is currently signed under a two-year contract with New Balance after previously being under contract with Team NB, Manchester in 2015–2017. He is now coached by Steve Vernon and is an affiliate of Liverpool Harriers and Athletic Club.

In his earlier career he ran for both Sale Harriers and Deeside Athletics. Before focusing on competing in marathons, he is noted to have won the 2015 England National Cross Country Championship and finish 17th in the European Cross Country Championships in 2019. Additionally, the Liverpool Harrier was also considered dominant on tarmac 2018 and 2019, winning 10k races at Telford, Cardiff, Wrexham and Chester along with posting the fastest leg at the Northern 6 Stage Relays. In the journey switching to marathon distance, Hulson secured the 2019 Welsh half marathon record in Cardiff.

Hulson completed his debut marathon in Valencia achieving a time of 2:14:22 (2019).

== Personal life ==
He lives in Chester and is the Managing Director of his family 150 year-old bakery in Mold, North Wales and has recently opened a Chester store.
