= Joseph Tiophil Panga =

Tanzanian long-distance runner

Personal information
- Born: 26 June 1995 (age 31)

Sport
- Country: Tanzania
- Sport: Long-distance running

Joseph Tiophil Panga (born 26 June 1995) is a Tanzanian long-distance runner.

In 2019, he competed in the senior men's race at the 2019 IAAF World Cross Country Championships held in Aarhus, Denmark. He finished in 32nd place. In September 2025, he ran 2:09:35 at the Berlin Marathon, good enough for a finish among the top-ten.
