= Patricia Chepkwemoi =

Ugandan long-distance runner

- Born: 1994|July|28
- Citizenship: Ugandan
- Known for: Long-distance runner and Ugandan representative in International competitions

Patricia Chepkwemoi (born 28 July 1994) is a Ugandan long-distance runner who competes in cross country, track and road running events. She has represented Uganda in International competitions including global championships in cross country and mountain running.

== Athletics career ==
At the 2015 World Cross Country Championships she finished 30th in the senior race and won a bronze medal in the team competition. She finished fourth at the 2018 World Mountain Running Championships.

This achievement contributed to one of Uganda's notable performances in Women's cross country running alongside athletes such as Juliet Chekwel and Adero Nyakisi.

== Track and road running ==
Chepkwemoi has also competed in track events such as the 5000 metres and 10,000 metres as well as road races including 10 km competitions.

== Personal bests and events ==
She has competed across multiple long-distance disciplines including:

- 1500 metres
- 3000 metres steepchase
- 5000 metres
- 10,000 metres
- 10 km road race

== Legacy and significance ==
Patricia Chepkwemoi is part of a generation of Ugandan female long-distance runners who have contributed to the country's growing presence in international athletics, particularly in cross country competitions. Her role in Uganda's team bronze medal at the 2015 World Cross Country Championships highlights her contribution to national success on the global stage.
