= Rosemary Wanjiru =

Kenyan long-distance runner

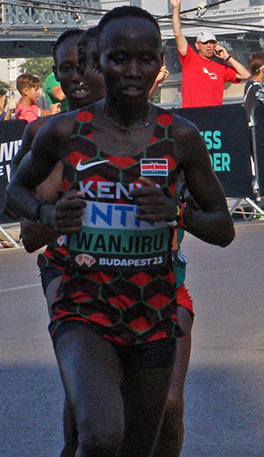
- Wanjiru at the 2023 World Athletics Championships

Personal information
- Born: 9 December 1994 (age 31) Mombasa, Kenya

Sport
- Country: Kenya
- Sport: Athletics
- Event: Long-distance running
Medal record
Women's athletics
Representing Kenya
African Games
Silver medal – second place	2015 Brazzaville	5000 m
World Marathon Majors
Gold medal – first place	2023 Tokyo	Marathon
Gold medal – first place	2025 Berlin	Marathon
Silver medal – second place	2022 Berlin	Marathon
Silver medal – second place	2024 Tokyo	Marathon

Rosemary Monica Wanjirū (born 9 December 1994) is a Kenyan professional female long-distance runner. She won the silver medal in the 5000 metres at the 2015 African Games, and represented her country at the 2019 World Athletics Championships, finishing fourth in the 10,000 metres. Wanjirū won the 2023 Tokyo Marathon and placed second at the 2022 Berlin Marathon. With her Tokyo mark, she sits sixth on the marathon world all-time list.

She achieved the second-fastest ever women's marathon debut at the time at the 2022 Berlin Marathon.

2025 Berlin Marathon winner

== Career ==
Rosemary Wanjirū moved to Japan as a teenager and began competing in long-distance competitions there. She was runner-up in the 3000 metres at the 2012 National Sports Festival of Japan, and won the national high schools championship over that distance the following year along with the Chiba International Cross Country title. In 2014 she began competing in Corporate Japanese competitions for Team Starts. In her first year of corporate competition she was East Japan champion over 1500 metres and 3000 m. She won the 2015 Sanyo Women's 10K and the 5000 m at the Japan Corporate Track and Field Championships, Oda Memorial and Nobeoka Golden Games.

Wanjirū made her international debut at the 2015 African Games and won a silver medal in the 5000 m, forming a Kenyan sweep of the medals alongside Margaret Chelimo and Alice Aprot. The year after she was beaten into second place at the Japan Corporate Championships by another Kenyan, Ann Karindi Mwangi. She repeated as champion at the Oda Memorial and Sanyo Women's 10K. In 2017 and 2018 she won both the Japan Corporate title and the Oda Memorial 5000 m.

In 2019, Wanjiru began to compete more frequently outside of Japan. She won the Lilac Bloomsday Run and Cherry Blossom Ten Mile Run in the United States before going on to place third in the 10,000 m at the Kenyan Athletics Championships. This earned her her second international selection for Kenya, this time at the 2019 World Athletics Championships. At the World Championships she teamed up with compatriots Agnes Jebet Tirop and Hellen Obiri to lead the pace. She fell away from the leaders in the final stage of the race and ended the race in fourth place, behind Sifan Hassan, Letesenbet Gidey and Tirop.

In 2020, she competed in the women's half marathon at the 2020 World Athletics Half Marathon Championships held in Gdynia, Poland, placing 10th.

Two years later, Wanjirū produced the second-fastest ever women's marathon debut at the Berlin Marathon with a time of 2:18:00. She went under the previous course record and finished second.

In March 2023, Wanjirū won the Tokyo Marathon with a 2:16:28 clocking, taking more than a minute and a half off her personal best to move up to sixth on the event's world all-time list. This was only the second marathon race of her career.

== International competitions ==
Representing Kenya
Year	Competition	Venue	Position	Event	Notes
2015	African Games	Brazzaville, Congo	2nd	5000 m	15:30.18
2019	World Championships	Doha, Qatar	4th	10,000 m	30:35.75
2020	World Half Marathon Championships	Gdynia, Poland	10th	Half Marathon	1:07:10
2023	World Championships	Budapest, Hungary	6th	Marathon	2:26:42
World Marathon Majors
2022	Berlin Marathon	Berlin, Germany	2nd	Marathon	2:18:00
2023	Tokyo Marathon	Tokyo, Japan	1st	Marathon	2:16:28
2024	Tokyo Marathon	Tokyo, Japan	2nd	Marathon	2:16:14
2025	Berlin Marathon	Berlin, Germany	1st	Marathon	2:21:05

== See also ==
- List of African Games medalists in athletics (women)
