= Maya Rehberg =

German steeplechase runner

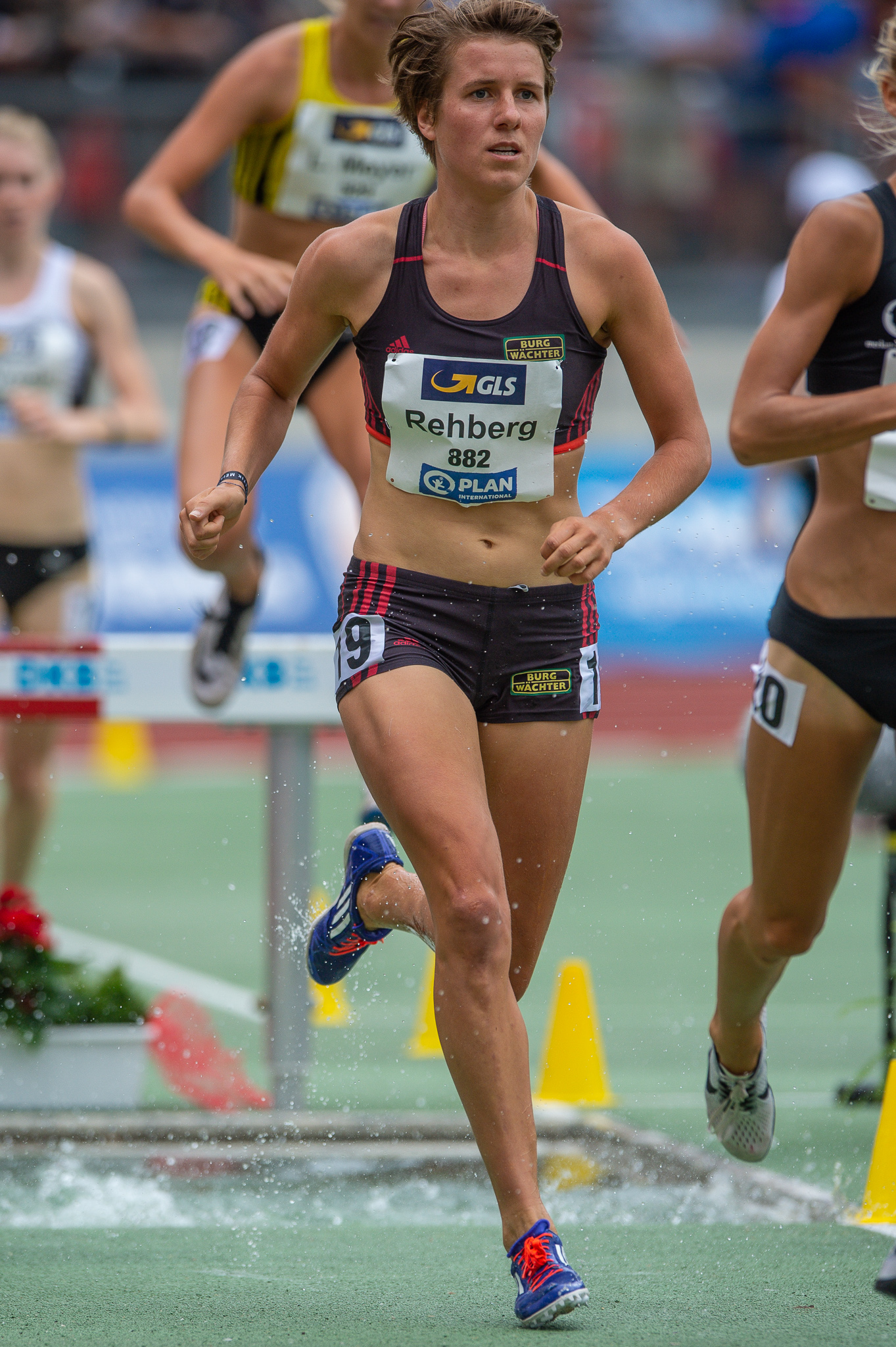
- Maya Rehberg in 2018

Personal information
- Born: 28 April 1994 (age 32)
- Height: 1.7 m (5 ft 7 in)
- Weight: 58 kg (128 lb)

Sport
- Country: Germany
- Sport: Athletics
- Event: 3000 m steeplechase

Maya Rehberg (born 28 April 1994) is a German athlete specializing in the 3,000-meter steeplechase. She won the bronze medal at the 2013 European Junior Championships.

== American university career ==
Rehberg attended Iona College, an NCAA Division I institution in New Rochelle, New York as a freshman in 2013–14 and set a school 3k steeplechase record with a time of 9:55.73 at the 2014 NCAA Division I Outdoor Track and Field Championships in Eugene, Oregon. On the indoor track, Rehberg set the Iona rookie record in both the 3,000- and 5,000-meter events. Her time of 9:24.51 at the ECAC Championships ranks third all-time at Iona. She was also runner-up at the 2013 MAAC Cross Country Championship and Iona's second finisher at the 2013 NCAA Northeast Regional Cross Country Championship.

== International competitions ==
Year	Competition	Venue	Position	Event	Notes
Representing Germany
2011	World Youth Championships	Lille, France	12th	1500 m	4:23.70
2012	World Junior Championships	Moncton, Canada	6th	3000 m s'chase	10:03.09
2013	European Junior Championships	Rieti, Italy	3rd	3000 m s'chase	10:00.04
2015	European U23 Championships	Tallinn, Estonia	6th	3000 m s'chase	9:56.25
2016	European Championships	Amsterdam, Netherlands	14th (h)	3000 m s'chase	9:47.32^{1}
2016	Olympic Games	Rio de Janeiro, Brazil	44th (h)	3000 m s'chase	9:51.73

^{1}Disqualified in the final

== Personal bests ==
Outdoor

- 1500 metres – 4:20.55 (Bochum 2012)
- 3000 metres – 9:15.39 (Osterode 2015)
- 5000 metres – 16:30.49 (Bremen 2013)
- 3000 metres steeplechase – 9:39.18 (Prague 2016)

Indoor

- 1500 metres – 4:26.59 (Halle 2013)
- One mile – 4:44.30 (Boston 2014)
- 3000 metres – 9:24.51 (Boston 2014)
- 5000 metres – 17:17.57 (New York 2014)
