= Stacey Chepkemboi Ndiwa =

Kenyan long-distance runner (born 1992)

Medal record

Women's athletics

Representing Kenya

World Cross Country Championships
Silver medal – second place	2015 Guiyang	Senior team

African Championships
Gold medal – first place	2018 Asaba	10,000 m

Commonwealth Games
Silver medal – second place	2018 Gold Coast	10,000 m

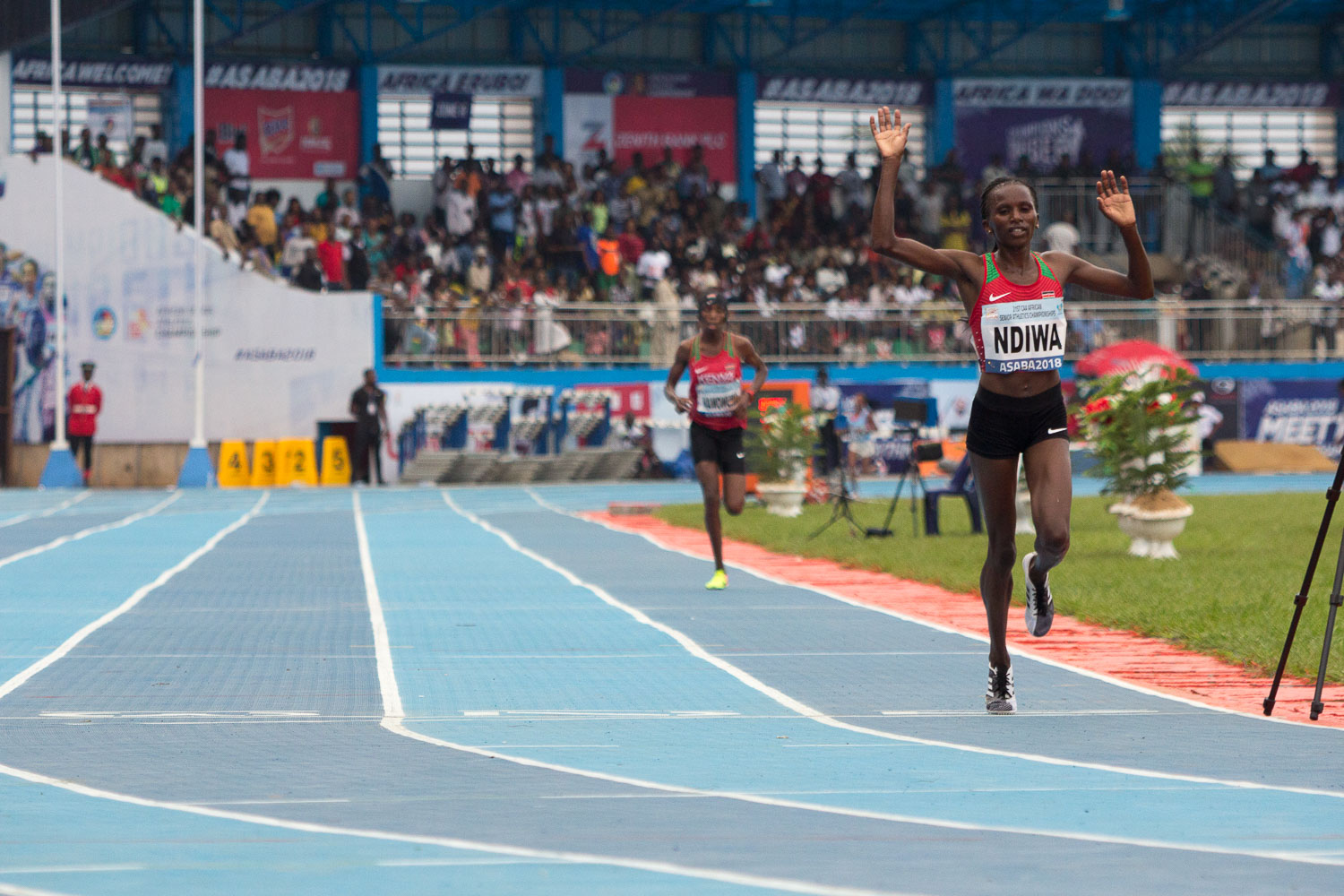
Stacy Ndiwa winning the 10,000m at the 2018 African Athletics Championships

Stacey Chepkemboi Ndiwa (born 6 December 1992) is a Kenyan female long-distance runner who competes across cross country, track and road running disciplines. She was a gold medallist at the 2008 Commonwealth Youth Games in the 1500 metres and was a team silver medallist at the IAAF World Cross Country Championships in 2015, where she was fifth individually. She was also a bronze medallist in the 1500 m at the 2011 African Junior Athletics Championships.

Ndiwa competed for the Kenya Police team, and won the team championships in the 5000 metres in 2013 and the cross country championship in 2015. She won the Tuskys Wareng Cross Country in 2012. Her IAAF Diamond League debut came at the 2014 Athletissima meet. Though she was only seventh at that meet, she had success at lower level meets, with wins at the Meeting Citta di Padova, Spitzen Leichtathletik Luzern and Meeting de Atletismo Madrid. On the roads, she won the Giro Podistico di Pettinengo and the São Silvestre de Luanda.

Sixth place at the Kenyan Cross Country Championships in 2015 brought her her first senior international selection for the world event. After a two-year gap in racing, she returned in 2017 focused on road running, being runner-up at the Azkoitia-Azpeitia Half Marathon and Zwolle Half Marathon. She set a personal best of 1:09:09 hours for the event at the Ústí nad Labem Half Marathon, where she was fourth. She closed the year with a win at the Houilles 10K.

== Personal bests ==
- 1500 metres – 4:06.10 min (2014)
- 3000 metres – 8:30.54 min (2014)
- 5000 metres – 15:15.14 min (2014)
- 10K run – 31:27 min (2017)
- Half marathon – 1:09:09 (2017)

== International competitions ==
Year	Competition	Venue	Position	Event	Notes
2008	World Junior Championships	Bydgoszcz, Poland	12th	1500 m	4:40.58
2008	Commonwealth Youth Games	Pune, India	1st	1500 m	4:20.16 GR
2011	African Junior Championships	Gaborone, Botswana	3rd	1500 m	4:15.84
2015	World Cross Country Championships	Guiyang, China	5th	Senior race	26:16
2015	World Cross Country Championships	Guiyang, China	2nd	Senior team	19 pts
2018	Commonwealth Games	Gold Coast, Australia	2nd	10000 m	31:46.36
2018	African Championships	Asaba, Nigeria	1st	10000 m	31:31.17
2025	Boston Marathon	Boston, Massachusetts	9th	42 km	2:23:29
