= Athletics at the 2015 African Games – Women's 5000 metres =

The women's 5000 metres event at the 2015 African Games was held on 17 September.

== Results ==
Rank	Name	Nationality	Time	Notes
1st place, gold medalist(s)	Margaret Chelimo	Kenya	15:30.15	
2nd place, silver medalist(s)	Rosemary Wanjiru	Kenya	15:30.18	
3rd place, bronze medalist(s)	Alice Aprot	Kenya	15:31.82	SB
4	Gotytom Gebreslase	Ethiopia	15:42.44	
5	Genet Yalew	Ethiopia	15:43.77	
6	Habetameenesh Tesfaye	Ethiopia	15:52.10	
7	Olivia Mugove Chitate	Zimbabwe	17:02.97	
8	Rahma Mehammed	Eritrea	17:07.95	
9	Clene Mambeke	Republic of the Congo	17:35.00	SB
10	Nina Ines Ombanda	Republic of the Congo	17:58.65	
11	Mokulube Makatisi	Lesotho	18:19.89	
	Cavaline Nahimana	Burundi	DNS	
	Mercy Malembo	Malawi	DNS	
