= Abdullah Al-Qwabani =

Yemeni long-distance runner

Personal information
- Born: 2 March 1999 (age 27) Aden, Yemen

Sport
- Country: Yemen
- Sport: Track and field
- Event: long-distance running
- Updated on 29 August 2015

Abdullah Al-Qwabani (born 2 March 1999) is a male Yemeni long-distance runner. He competed in the 5000 metres event at the 2015 World Championships in Athletics in Beijing, China.

Al-Qwabani began training in 2014, only one year before his first global championship, while he was still in school. He got his start in running through a development program by the IAAF. He aimed to study medicine after his athletic career was over.

At the World Championships, Al-Qwabani received widespread media attention for running his entire 5000 m heat barefoot. Despite finishing in last place, Al-Qwabani's performance was lauded and contrasted with the approach of Mo Farah in his heat. He did not speak English or Chinese and had to communicate with media using an Arabic translation app on his phone.

His time of 16:02.55 was a personal best. He said after, "I love running barefoot. It feels so good to touch the ground". Spectators cheered on his performance, and it was compared to that of Abebe Bikila and Zola Budd. He was said to have almost been run over as the field lapped him. Fellow competitor Caleb Ndiku said of him after the race, "He looks quite young and needs more experience [...] But he can become a good one".

In 2017, he competed in the junior men's race at the 2017 IAAF World Cross Country Championships held in Kampala, Uganda.

== See also ==
- Yemen at the 2015 World Championships in Athletics
