= Netsanet Gudeta =

Ethiopian long-distance runner (born 1991)

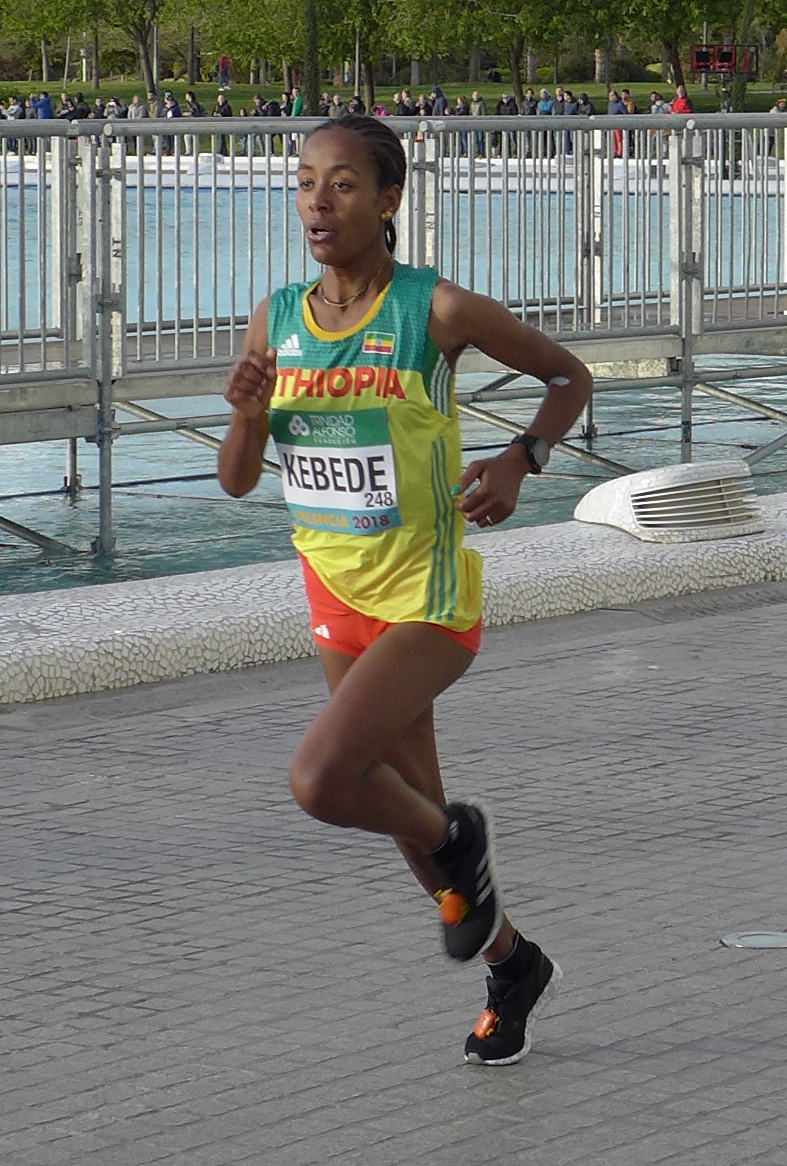

Medal record

Women's athletics

Representing Ethiopia

World Championships (XC)
Gold medal – first place	2015 Guiyang	Senior team
Bronze medal – third place	2015 Guiyang	Senior race

World Championships (HM)
Gold medal – first place	2018 Valencia	Individual
Gold medal – first place	2018 Valencia	Team

Netsanet Gudeta Kebede (born 12 February 1991) is an Ethiopian long-distance runner who competes in road running and cross country running events. She was the bronze medallist at the IAAF World Cross Country Championships in 2015. She shared in the team title at that competition and also won team silver at the IAAF World Half Marathon Championships in 2014. Her best for the half marathon is 66:11 minutes (women's only race world record).

== Career ==
Netsanet grew up in Bekoji, Ethiopia – an area well known for producing top athletes, including Kenenisa Bekele and Tirunesh Dibaba. She began training with Aberu Kebede and Aselefech Mergia, among others She made her debut abroad at the 2013 Prague Grand Prix in the Czech Republic, finishing in tenth place. The Great Ethiopian Run brought her name to prominence nationally as she saw off a challenge over the 10K distance from Atsede Baysa, the 2012 Chicago Marathon winner. She closed the year with a runner-up finish at the São Silvestre Road Race in Brazil, setting a 15K best of 52:08 minutes.

Her opening race of 2014 was March's Roma-Ostia Half Marathon and in her debut over the distance she finished in third place with a time of 68:53 minutes. She was chosen to represent her country at the 2014 IAAF World Half Marathon Championships later that month and was the leading Ethiopian in a Kenya-dominated race. Her finishing time of 68:46 minutes was a new personal best and brought her sixth place, as well as a team silver medal. She continued on the international road circuit and was sixth at the World 10K Bangalore and tenth at the Luanda Half Marathon. She returned to the Great Ethiopian Run in November but was edged out of the title by Wude Ayalew. At the São Silvestre Road Race on New Year's Eve, she was again runner-up.

Netsanet turned to cross country at the beginning of 2015 and her fourth-place finish at the Jan Meda International Cross Country gained her another international selection. She adapted well to the grass course of the 2015 IAAF World Cross Country Championships and won her first individual medal by finishing third behind Ethiopian teammate Senbere Teferi. The pair led Ethiopia to the senio women's team title at the competition.

In 2020, she competed in the women's half marathon at the 2020 World Athletics Half Marathon Championships held in Gdynia, Poland.

== International competitions ==
Year	Competition	Venue	Position	Event	Notes
2014	World Half Marathon Championships	Copenhagen, Denmark	6th	Half marathon	1:08:46
2014	World Half Marathon Championships	Copenhagen, Denmark	2nd	Team	3:27:05
2015	World Cross Country Championships	Guiyang, China	3rd	Senior race	26:11
2015	World Cross Country Championships	Guiyang, China	1st	Senior team	
2018	World Half Marathon Championships	Valencia, Spain	1st	Half marathon	66:11 (World record, women's only)

== Personal bests ==
- 10K run – 31:32 min (2015)
- Half marathon – 67:31 min (2015)
- Half marathon – 66:11 min (2018) [broke the women-only world record]
