= Charles Hunter (athlete) =

American long-distance runner

Personal information
- Nationality: American
- Born: May 3, 1892 San Diego, California
- Died: November 21, 1974 (aged 82) San Francisco, California

Sport
- Sport: Long-distance running
- Event: 5000 metres

Charles Hunter (May 3, 1892 – November 21, 1974) was an American long-distance runner. He competed in the men's 5000 metres at the 1920 Summer Olympics.
