= Adrian Pillajo =

Ecuadorian long-distance runner

Personal information
- Born: 7 July 1991 (age 34)

Sport
- Country: Ecuador
- Sport: Long-distance running

Adrian Pillajo (born 7 July 1991) is an Ecuadorian long-distance runner.

In 2018, he competed in the men's half marathon at the 2018 IAAF World Half Marathon Championships held in Valencia, Spain. He finished in 137th place.
