= Linet Toroitich Chebet =

Ugandan long-distance runner (born 1992)

Personal information
- Born: 4 November 1992 (age 32)

Sport
- Country: Uganda
- Sport: Long-distance running

Linet Toroitich Chebet (born 4 November 1992) is a Ugandan long-distance runner. She competed in the women's marathon at the 2019 World Athletics Championships held in Doha, Qatar. She did not finish her race.

In 2013, she competed in the senior women's race at the 2013 IAAF World Cross Country Championships held in Bydgoszcz, Poland. She finished in 74th place.

In 2014, she represented Uganda at the 2014 Commonwealth Games held in Glasgow, Scotland in the women's 10,000 metres event. She finished in 6th place out of 13 competitors.

In 2019, she competed in the women's half marathon at the 2019 African Games held in Rabat, Morocco. She finished in 9th place.
