= Olivia Mugove Chitate =

Zimbabwean long-distance runner

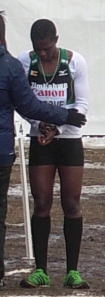

Personal information
- Born: 7 December 1987 (age 38)

Sport
- Country: Zimbabwe
- Sport: Athletics
- Event: 5000 metres
- Updated on 29 August 2015

Olivia Mugove Chitate (born 7 December 1987) is a long-distance runner from Zimbabwe. She competed in the 5000 metres at the 2015 World Championships in Beijing finishing 24th.

== International competitions ==
Year	Competition	Venue	Position	Event	Notes
Representing Zimbabwe
2015	World Championships	Beijing, China	24th (h)	5000 m	16:34.70
2015	African Games	Brazzaville, Republic of the Congo	7th	5000 m	17:02.97

== Personal bests ==
- 5000 metres – 16:34.70 (Beijing 2015)
