= Belaynesh Oljira =

Ethiopian long-distance runner (born 1990)

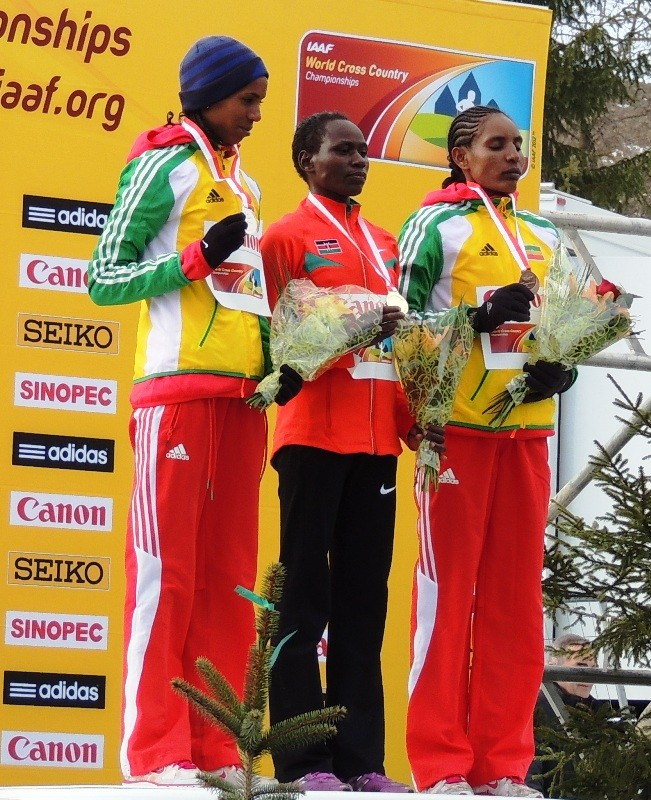
- Belaynesh Oljira (right) at the 2013 World Cross Country Championships

Medal record

Women's athletics

Representing Ethiopia

World Championships
Bronze medal – third place	2013 Moscow	10,000 m

World Cross Country Championships
Bronze medal – third place	2013 Poland	Cross Country

African Championships
Bronze medal – third place	2014 Marrakesh	10,000 m

Belaynesh Oljira Jemama (Amharic: በላይነሽ ኦልጂራ, born 26 June 1990) is an Ethiopian long-distance runner who competes mainly in 10K and half marathon races. She represented her country at the 2012 Summer Olympics, the 2013 World Championships and the IAAF World Cross Country Championships in 2011 and 2013.

== Career ==
Born in Welega in Ethiopia, she demonstrated her potential as an endurance runner with a third-place finish at the Great Ethiopian Run. She began competing on the European circuit the following year and won the Le Mans Cross Country race before placing second at the European Clubs Cross Country Cup. She ran at IAAF Diamond League meetings that summer and set a 3000 metres track best of 8:40.73 minutes at the Herculis meet and a personal best time of 14:58.16 minutes for the 5000 metres at the Meeting Areva. Belaynesh found success on the roads that year, having runner-up finishes at the 10 km du Conseil Général and Marseille-Cassis Classic, a third place in the Zhuhai Half Marathon, and a win at the Nice Half Marathon (where she set a best of 1:10:22 hours). She ended the year with a third place at the Sao Silvestre de Luanda in Angola.

Representing Ethiopia's Commercial Bank team, she came third at the Jan Meda Cross Country in February 2011 and earned herself a spot for the Ethiopian world team. At the 2011 IAAF World Cross Country Championships, she came tenth in the women's senior race and took a share in the team silver medal alongside Meselech Melkamu, Wude Ayalew and Genzebe Dibaba. Turning to the track, she won the 10,000 metres title at the Ethiopian Athletics Championships. She then set a personal best of 31:17.80 minutes for that event at the Golden Spike Ostrava meet and placed third at the World 10K Bangalore behind Dire Tune and Merima Mohammed. She was selected for the Ethiopian team at the 2011 World Championships in Athletics, but ultimately did not compete.

In November she was runner-up to Linet Masai at the Cross de Atapuerca race, then ran a new best of 1:07:27 hours at the Delhi Half Marathon, finishing in fourth place. Her first race of 2012 saw her win the Houston Half Marathon with a course record time of 1:08:26 hours (also a Texas state record). She greatly improved her 10,000 metres track best at the Prefontaine Classic in June, running a time of 30:26.70 minutes to take third place. This gained her a place on the Ethiopian team for the 2012 London Olympics and she managed to finish fifth in the 10,000 metres final.

She made a step up in distance to the marathon at the start of 2013 and came fifth at the Dubai Marathon with her debut run of 2:25:01 hours. At the 2013 World Championships, she won the bronze in the 10,000 m, having also won bronze in the 2013 World Cross Country Championships. In October 2014 she won the 10K Great South Run in Portsmouth UK.

She finished in 9th at the 2015 World Cross Country Championship.

== Personal bests ==
- 5000 metres – 14:42.57 min (Oregon, 2016)
- 10,000 metres – 30:26.70 min (Oregon, 2012)
- 10 km (road) – 31:07 min (Marseille, 2010)
- Half marathon – 1:07:27 hrs (New Delhi, 2011)
- Marathon – 2:21:53 hours (Frankfurt, 2018)
