= Nyakisi Adero =

Ugandan long-distance runner

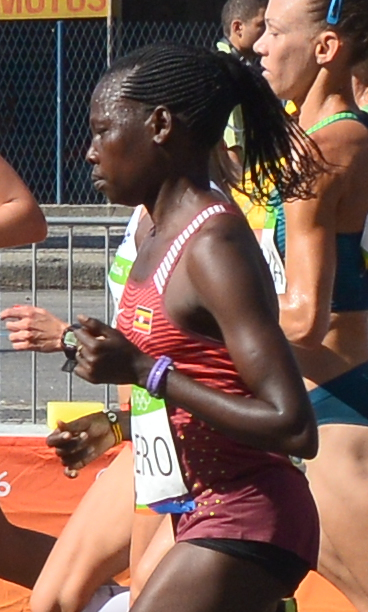
- Adero at the 2016 Olympics

Personal information
- Born: 2 July 1986 (age 40)

Sport
- Sport: Track and field
- Event: 10,000 m – marathon

Achievements and titles
- Personal bests: 10,000 m – 33:02.1 (2009); Marathon – 2:34:54 (2015)
Medal record
Representing Uganda
IAAF World Cross Country Championships
| Bronze medal – third place | 2015 Guiyang | Team |

Nyakisi Adero (born 2 July 1986) is a Ugandan long-distance runner. Adero stopped competing in 2011–12 after giving birth and returned to track in May 2012. She ran her first official marathon in October 2015, at the Amsterdam Marathon. She set a new Ugandan record at 2:34:54 and qualified for the 2016 Olympics. She placed 68th at the Rio Olympics.
