= Zhu Renxue =

Chinese male marathoner (born 1991)

Zhu Renxue (simplified Chinese: 朱仁学; traditional Chinese: 朱仁學; born April 6, 1991, in Huize, Yunnan) is a Chinese male marathoner. He took the 3rd place at the Chongqing International Marathon and the Olympic trials on March 21, 2016, Zhu was eligible for Rio 2016 Olympic marathon entries.
