= Zelalem Bacha =

Bahraini long-distance runner

Personal information
- Born: 10 January 1988 (age 38)

Sport
- Country: Bahrain
- Sport: Long-distance running

Zelalem Bacha (born 10 January 1988) is a Bahraini long-distance runner.

In 2019, he competed in the senior men's race at the 2019 IAAF World Cross Country Championships held in Aarhus, Denmark. He finished in 90th place.
