= 2015 IAAF World Cross Country Championships =

41st World Cross Country Championships
- Organisers: IAAF
- Edition: 41st
- Date: 28 March
- Host city: Guiyang, China
- Venue: Guiyang horse racing circuit
- Events: 4
- Distances: 12 km – Senior men 8 km – Junior men 8 km – Senior women 6 km – Junior women
- Participation: 410 athletes from 51 nations
- Official website: Guiyang 2015

The 2015 IAAF World Cross Country Championships (Chinese: 2015国际田联世界越野锦标赛) was the 41st edition of the global championships in cross country running, organised by the International Association of Athletics Federations. It was held in Guiyang, China on 28 March. It was the first time that the event was held in China, and the third occasion it took place in Asia (after Fukuoka in 2006, and Amman in 2009). Senior and junior races were held for men and women, with the four races having both a team and individual element.

== Overview ==
The senior individual titles were won by Kenyan athletes. Geoffrey Kipsang, a former junior champion and reigning world half marathon champion, took the men's title by a margin of eight seconds. The 19-year-old Agnes Jebet Tirop was the women's champion, establishing herself as a senior athlete for the first time after her runner-up finish in the junior race at the 2013 edition. This made her the second youngest ever winner of that title, after Zola Budd in 1985. Aside from these victories, it was Ethiopia that had the most success: Yasin Haji and Letesenbet Gidey were crowned the junior champions while the Ethiopian teams won the senior titles and had a clean sweep in the women's junior race. Bahrain was the only non-East African nation to win a medal, albeit with teams of entirely African expatriates.

The host choice reflected the increasing prominence of China in the world of athletics. Having only staged one major IAAF event before 2006, the country quickly rose to host the 2006 World Junior Championships, the 2008 Olympic athletics, 2010 World Half Marathon Championships, and 2014 IAAF World Race Walking Cup. The cross country event preceded Beijing's holding of the 2015 World Championships in Athletics later that year.

The course for the competition was a former horse racing course around 30 km from the city centre, which had hosted the Asian Cross Country Championships in 2005 as well as ten editions of the Chinese Cross Country Championships. In addition to the main competition, mass participation races over 2 km and 4 km were held in the morning before the official opening ceremony, aimed at improving public engagement in the sport.

== Preparation ==
In the year before the competition, the Guiyang International Half Marathon was inaugurated, increasing local running participation. This added to the history of athletics in the region, which included a long-running Guiyang road race in its 44th edition that year. The 2015 Chinese national championships a month before the global event were not contested at the same course, instead being held in Qujing. Zhang Xinyan won both the women's long and short course titles, while Zhu Renxue and Wang Ligang won the men's long and short races, respectively.

== Schedule ==
All four races were held in the afternoon in the usual traditional, with junior races preceding the senior races, and the senior men's event concluding the programme.

Date	Time (CST)	Events
24 March	12:00	Junior race women
24 March	12:30	Junior race men
24 March	13:15	Senior race women
24 March	14:10	Senior race men

== Medallists ==
Event	Gold		Silver		Bronze	
Individual
Senior men (12 km)	Geoffrey Kipsang (KEN)	34:52	Bedan Karoki (KEN)	35:00	Muktar Edris (ETH)	35:06
Senior women (8 km)	Agnes Jebet Tirop (KEN)	26:01	Senbere Teferi (ETH)	26:06	Netsanet Gudeta (ETH)	26:11
Junior men (8 km)	Yasin Haji (ETH)	23:42	Geoffrey Kipkirui Korir (KEN)	23:47	Alfred Ngeno (KEN)	23:54
Junior women (6 km)	Letesenbet Gidey (ETH)	19:48	Dera Dida (ETH)	19:49	Etagegn Woldu (ETH)	19:53
Team
Senior men	Ethiopia	20	Kenya	20	Bahrain	54
Senior women	Ethiopia	17	Kenya	19	Uganda	101
Junior men	Kenya	19	Ethiopia	33	Eritrea	52
Junior women	Ethiopia	11	Kenya	33	Bahrain	52

== Results ==
=== Senior men's race ===
Individual race
Rank	Athlete	Country	Time (m:s)
1st place, gold medalist(s)	Geoffrey Kipsang Kamworor	Kenya	34:52
2nd place, silver medalist(s)	Bedan Karoki Muchiri	Kenya	35:00
3rd place, bronze medalist(s)	Muktar Edris	Ethiopia	35:06
4	Hagos Gebrhiwet	Ethiopia	35:15
5	Leonard Barsoton	Kenya	35:24
6	Tamirat Tola	Ethiopia	35:33
7	Atsedu Tsegay	Ethiopia	35:47
8	Moses Kibet	Uganda	35:53
9	Ismail Juma	Tanzania	35:55
10	Aweke Ayalew	Bahrain	35:56
11	Albert Kibichii Rop	Bahrain	35:59
12	Phillip Kiprono Langat	Kenya	36:05
Full results

- 111 entrants, 110 starters, 108 finishers.

Teams
Rank	Team	Points
1st place, gold medalist(s)	Ethiopia: Muktar Edris / 3; Hagos Gebrhiwet / 4; Tamirat Tola / 6; Atsedu Tsegay / 7; (Bonsa Dida) / (14); (Tesfaye Abera) / (26)	20
2nd place, silver medalist(s)	Kenya: Geoffrey Kipsang Kamworor / 1; Bedan Karoki Muchiri / 2; Leonard Barsoton / 5; Phillip Kiprono Langat / 12; (Moses Letoyie) / (16); (Joseph Kiprono Kiptum) / (21)	20
3rd place, bronze medalist(s)	Bahrain: Aweke Ayalew / 10; Albert Kibichii Rop / 11; El Hassan Elabbassi / 15; Isaac Korir / 18; (Zelalem Bacha) / (19); (Hassan Chani) / (20)	54
4	Eritrea	91
5	Uganda	92
6	Tanzania	130
7	United States	131
8	Rwanda	153
Full results

- Note: Athletes in parentheses did not score for the team result.

=== Senior women's race ===
Individual race
Rank	Athlete	Country	Time (m:s)
1st place, gold medalist(s)	Agnes Jebet Tirop	Kenya	26:01
2nd place, silver medalist(s)	Senbere Teferi	Ethiopia	26:06
3rd place, bronze medalist(s)	Netsanet Gudeta	Ethiopia	26:11
4	Alemitu Heroye	Ethiopia	26:14
5	Stacy Chepkemboi Ndiwa	Kenya	26:16
6	Emily Chebet Muge	Kenya	26:18
7	Irene Chepet Cheptai	Kenya	26:26
8	Mamitu Daska	Ethiopia	26:29
9	Belaynesh Oljira	Ethiopia	26:29
10	Genet Yalew	Ethiopia	27:00
11	Nazret Weldu	Eritrea	27:19
12	Janet Kisa	Kenya	27:22
Full results

- 83 entrants, 82 starters, 80 finishers.

Teams
Rank	Team	Points
1st place, gold medalist(s)	Ethiopia: Senbere Teferi / 2; Netsanet Gudeta / 3; Alemitu Heroye / 4; Mamitu Daska / 8; (Belaynesh Oljira) / (9); (Genet Yalew) / (10)	17
2nd place, silver medalist(s)	Kenya: Agnes Jebet Tirop / 1; Stacy Chepkemboi Ndiwa / 5; Emily Chebet Muge / 6; Irene Chepet Cheptai / 7; (Janet Kisa) / (12); (Margaret Chelimo Kipkemboi) / (13)	19
3rd place, bronze medalist(s)	Uganda: Juliet Chekwel / 14; Nyakisi Adero / 24; Patricia Chepkwemoi / 30; Emily Chebet / 33; (Nancy Cheptegei) / (DNF)	101
4	China	122
5	United States	128
6	Algeria	139
7	Spain	139
8	Peru	156
Full results

- Note: Athletes in parentheses did not score for the team result.

=== Junior men's race ===
Individual race
Rank	Athlete	Country	Time (m:s)
1st place, gold medalist(s)	Yasin Haji	Ethiopia	23:42
2nd place, silver medalist(s)	Geoffrey Kipkirui Korir	Kenya	23:47
3rd place, bronze medalist(s)	Alfred Ngeno	Kenya	23:54
4	Dominic Kiptarus	Kenya	24:00
5	Evans Rutto Chematot	Bahrain	24:03
6	Abraham Habte	Eritrea	24:04
7	Yihunilign Adane	Ethiopia	24:05
8	Abe Gashahun	Ethiopia	24:08
9	Fred Musobo	Uganda	24:10
10	Rodgers Chumo	Kenya	24:11
11	Joshua Kiprui Cheptegei	Uganda	24:11
12	Moses Koech	Kenya	24:11
Full results

- 118 entrants, 118 starters, 113 finishers.

Teams
Rank	Team	Points
1st place, gold medalist(s)	Kenya: Geoffrey Kipkirui Korir / 2; Alfred Ngeno / 3; Dominic Kiptarus / 4; Rodgers Chumo / 10; (Moses Koech) / (12); (John Langat) / (16)	19
2nd place, silver medalist(s)	Ethiopia: Yasin Haji / 1; Yihunilign Adane / 7; Abe Gashahun / 8; Haymanot Alewe / 17; (Yohans Mekasha) / (21); (Adane Weletaw) / (24)	33
3rd place, bronze medalist(s)	Eritrea: Abraham Habte / 6; Afewerki Berhane / 13; Mogos Shumay / 14; Aron Kifle / 19; (Yemane Haileselassie) / (23)	52
4	Bahrain	70
5	Uganda	76
6	United States	132
7	Morocco	139
8	Italy	176
Full results

- Note: Athletes in parentheses did not score for the team result.

=== Junior women's race ===
Individual race
Rank	Athlete	Country	Time (m:s)
1st place, gold medalist(s)	Letesenbet Gidey	Ethiopia	19:48
2nd place, silver medalist(s)	Dera Dida	Ethiopia	19:49
3rd place, bronze medalist(s)	Etagegn Woldu	Ethiopia	19:53
4	Daisy Jepkemei	Kenya	19:59
5	Mihret Tefera	Ethiopia	20:02
6	Dagmawit Kibru	Ethiopia	20:07
7	Gladys Jeptekeny Kipkoech	Kenya	20:13
8	Desi Mokonin	Bahrain	20:17
9	Ruth Jebet	Bahrain	20:20
10	Winfred Nzisa Mbithe	Kenya	20:31
11	Stella Chesang	Uganda	20:37
12	Rosefline Chepngetich	Kenya	20:38
Full results

- 101 entrants, 100 starters, 87 finishers.

Teams
Rank	Team	Points
1st place, gold medalist(s)	Ethiopia: Letesenbet Gidey / 1; Dera Dida / 2; Etagegn Woldu / 3; Mihret Tefera / 5; (Dagmawit Kibru) / (6); (Zerfe Lemeneh) / (14)	11
2nd place, silver medalist(s)	Kenya: Daisy Jepkemei / 4; Gladys Jeptekeny Kipkoech / 7; Winfred Nzisa Mbithe / 10; Rosefline Chepngetich / 12; (Winnie Jebichii Koima) / (13); (Joyline Cherotich) / (22)	33
3rd place, bronze medalist(s)	Bahrain: Desi Mokonin / 8; Ruth Jebet / 9; Fatuma Jawaro Chebsi / 15; Bontu Rebitu / 20; (Dalila Abdulkadir Gosa) / (28)	52
4	Uganda	65
5	Japan	98
6	China	136
7	Eritrea	138
8	United States	177
Full results

- Note: Athletes in parentheses did not score for the team result.

== Medal table ==
Rank	Nation	Gold	Silver	Bronze	Total
1	Ethiopia	5	3	3	11
2	Kenya	3	5	1	9
3	Bahrain	0	0	2	2
4	Eritrea	0	0	1	1
4	Uganda	0	0	1	1
Totals (5 entries)		8	8	8	24

- Note: Totals include both individual and team medals, with medals in the team competition counting as one medal.

== Participation ==
A total of 410 athletes from 51 countries participated, excluding non-starters. This represented an increase of ten nations from the previous edition and thirteen additional participating athletes in total.

- Algeria (19)
- Australia (22)
- Bahrain (15)
- Belarus (1)
- Bhutan (2)
- Brazil (4)
- Burundi (3)
- Canada (22)
- China (24)
- Chinese Taipei (1)
- Denmark (6)
- Ecuador (4)
- Egypt (1)
- Eritrea (16)
- Ethiopia (24)
- Fiji (1)
- France (13)
- Great Britain (17)
- India (2)
- Indonesia (2)
- Italy (6)
- Japan (21)
- Jordan (2)
- Kenya (24)
- Kyrgyzstan (1)
- Mongolia (2)
- Morocco (11)
- Nepal (2)
- North Korea (4)
- Peru (12)
- Poland (4)
- Portugal (2)
- Qatar (4)
- Rwanda (4)
- Saudi Arabia (1)
- Seychelles (1)
- Singapore (2)
- South Africa (23)
- Spain (14)
- Sudan (5)
- Sweden (1)
- Switzerland (1)
- Tajikistan (2)
- Tanzania (5)
- Turkey (1)
- Uganda (19)
- United States (24)
- Uzbekistan (4)
- Yemen (6)
- Zambia (1)
- Zimbabwe (2)
