= Cynthia Jerotich Limo =

Kenyan long-distance runner (born 1989)

Medal record

Women's athletics

Representing Kenya

IAAF World Half Marathon Championships
| Gold medal – first place | 2016 Cardiff | Team |
| Silver medal – second place | 2016 Cardiff | Individual |

Cynthia Jerotich Limo (born 18 December 1989) is a Kenyan female long-distance runner who competes mainly in road running competition. She has the silver medallist at the IAAF World Half Marathon Championships in 2016. Her half marathon personal best of 66:04 minutes, set in 2016, ranks her as the fourth fastest woman ever for the distance.

== Career ==
Limo had her first successful locally at the 2009 Baringo 15K, where she placed third. The following year she ran at the Kenyan Cross Country Championships, but was far down the field, finishing 46th. It was on the roads of France that she began to establish herself as a high calibre runner. She had top three finishes at the 2010 Nancy Half Marathon and 20 Kilomètres de Paris. She continued to focus on French races in the two subsequent years. Her first win came at the 20 Km de Tours in 2011 and in 2012 she marked her progress with a win at the Humarathon half marathon in a best of 70:06 minutes and a win at the Paris 20K in 65:36 minutes.

Limo gave her first sub-70-minute performance to win at the 2013 Rabat Half Marathon. She finished in top two of all her road races that year, bar a third-place finish at the Humarathon. She won the Saint Denis Marathon and was runner-up at the Paris 20K and the Marseille-Cassis Classique Internationale. She moved on from the French circuit in the 2014 season, starting with a win at the Madrid Half Marathon then a highly successful tour of American races which included numerous podium finishes, among them wins at the Steamboat Classic, Garry Bjorklund Half Marathon and runner-up finishes at the Crim 10-Miler and Boston Half Marathon, setting a new best of 68:24 minutes at the latter. She had her first win on home turf at the Baringo Half Marathon in November.

The 2015 season proved to be the year in which Limo moved into the global elite of half marathon running. She made the top three at the Ras Al Khaimah Half Marathon and her best of 67:02 minutes ranked her as the fifth fastest woman in the world that year. She was the Hy-Vee half marathon winner associated with the Drake Relays, was runner-up in Boston and at the Luanda Half Marathon, then topped the field at the Delhi Half Marathon. Her success in American continued with wins at the Cooper River Bridge Run, Lilac Bloomsday Run and second-place finishes at the Cherry Blossom 10-Miler, Freihofer's Run For Women and Utica Boilermaker.

The Houston Half Marathon was Limo's first race of 2016 and a duel with Mary Wacera Ngugi led to very fast times, with Limo in second place at 66:41 minutes meaning she moved up to eleventh on the all-time list for women's half marathon. A month later she improved even further to 66:04 minutes at the Ras Al Khaimah race – a time which made her the third fastest woman ever for the distance. She gained selection for the 2016 IAAF World Half Marathon Championships as a result – her first international call-up – and was among the favourites, alongside Ngugi. In the race held in Cardiff the five-woman Kenyan team formed the majority of the early leaders. After the halfway point only Limo, Ngugi and Peres Jepchirchir remained. Limo was beaten in a sprint finish by the less experienced Jepchirchir. The trio earned the Kenyan women the team title and Limo helped complete a podium sweep with Jepchirchir and Ngugi.

== International competitions ==
| Year | Competition | Venue | Position | Event | Notes |
|---|---|---|---|---|---|
| 2016 | World Half Marathon Championships | Cardiff, United Kingdom | 2nd | Half marathon | 1:07:34 min |
| 2016 | World Half Marathon Championships | Cardiff, United Kingdom | 1st | Team | 3:22:59 |

== Road race wins ==
- Lilac Bloomsday Run: 2016
- Ras Al Khaimah Half Marathon: 2016
- Delhi Half Marathon: 2015
- Parkersburg Half Marathon: 2014
- Garry Bjorklund Half Marathon: 2014
- Baringo Half Marathon: 2014
- Madrid Half Marathon: 2014
- Saint Denis Half Marathon: 2013
- Rabat Half Marathon: 2013
- Humarathon half marathon: 2012
- Annecy Half Marathon: 2012
- Paris-Versailles Road Race: 2012
- 20K de Paris: 2012
- Lilac Bloomsday Run 12K: 2015
- Cooper River Bridge Run 10K: 2015
- Steamboat Classic 4-miler: 2014
- Buffalo 4-Mile Chase: 2014

== Personal bests ==
- 10K run – 31:08 min (2015)
- Half marathon – 66:04 min (2016)
