= Simon Cheprot =

Kenyan long-distance runner (born 1993)

Medal record

Men's athletics

Representing Kenya

IAAF World Half Marathon Championships
Gold medal – first place	2016 Cardiff	Team

Simon Cheprot (born 2 July 1993) is a Kenyan long-distance runner who competes mainly in road running events. He has twice represented Kenya at the IAAF World Half Marathon Championships and won a team gold medal in 2016. His half marathon personal best is 59:20 minutes, set in 2013, which ranks him in the top 40 of all time.

== Career ==
Cheprot first emerged as a distance runner on the American road circuit in 2009, winning a series of low level races. The following year he had top eight finishes at high level races, including the Lilac Bloomsday Run, Bolder Boulder and Cooper River Bridge Run. He began competing in Europe in the 2011 season and made his debut in the half marathon, taking third place at both the San Blas Half Marathon and Azkoitia-Azpeitia Half Marathon. He achieved a time of 61:59 minutes at the latter race, heading towards elite standard. He tried his hand at marathon running in 2013, but failed to finish in either Venice or Verona. His shorter distance rimes improved however, going under 28 minutes for the 10K run for the first time and setting a half marathon best of 61:07 minutes at the Route du Vin Half Marathon – the 10K time ranked in the world's top forty for the year.

Cheprot made a breakthrough at the 2013 Roma-Ostia Half Marathon, finishing third behind world champion Wilson Kiprop with a time of 59:20 minutes. This moved him to seventh in that year's rankings. Better results did not materialise late rin the year, however, as he failed to complete the Rome City Marathon and was three minutes slower than his best at the Portugal Half Marathon, coming sixth. A fourth-place finish at the 2014 Roma-Ostia earned him his first international call-up and at the 2014 IAAF World Half Marathon Championships he placed 22nd overall. He also managed a 10K best at the Prague Grand Prix that year, recording a time of 27:41 minutes which again ranked him in the world's top ten for the season.

Cheprot performed consistently in the 2015 season. He was runner-up in Roma-Ostia with a time of 59:39 minutes, then was runner-up at the Ottawa 10K and won the Corrida de Langueux. All five of his half marathon outings that year brought times close to the one hour mark – his best of 59:32 minutes for fourth at the Copenhagen Half Marathon put him at twelfth place on the 2015 world lists.

He was chosen for the Kenyan team at the 2016 IAAF World Half Marathon Championships and earned his first global medal as his sixth-place finish helped the Kenyan trio of Cheprot, Geoffrey Kipsang Kamworor and Bedan Karoki Muchiri to record a sub-3-hour time for the team gold medals.

== International competitions ==
Year	Competition	Venue	Position	Event	Notes
2014	World Half Marathon Championships	Copenhagen, Denmark	22nd	Half marathon	1:01:37
2016	World Half Marathon	Cardiff, United Kingdom	6th	Half marathon	1:00:12
2016	World Half Marathon	Cardiff, United Kingdom	1st	Team	2:58:58

== Personal bests ==
- 10K run – 27:41 min (2014)
- Half marathon – 59:20 min (2013)
