= Bloomsday (disambiguation) =

Bloomsday may refer to:

- Bloomsday, a commemoration on 16 June in honor of James Joyce.
- Lilac Bloomsday Run, a road running event in Spokane, Washington.
- Bloomsday, episode nineteen, season two of the cartoon The Tick.
