= Sinead Diver =

Australian long-distance runner

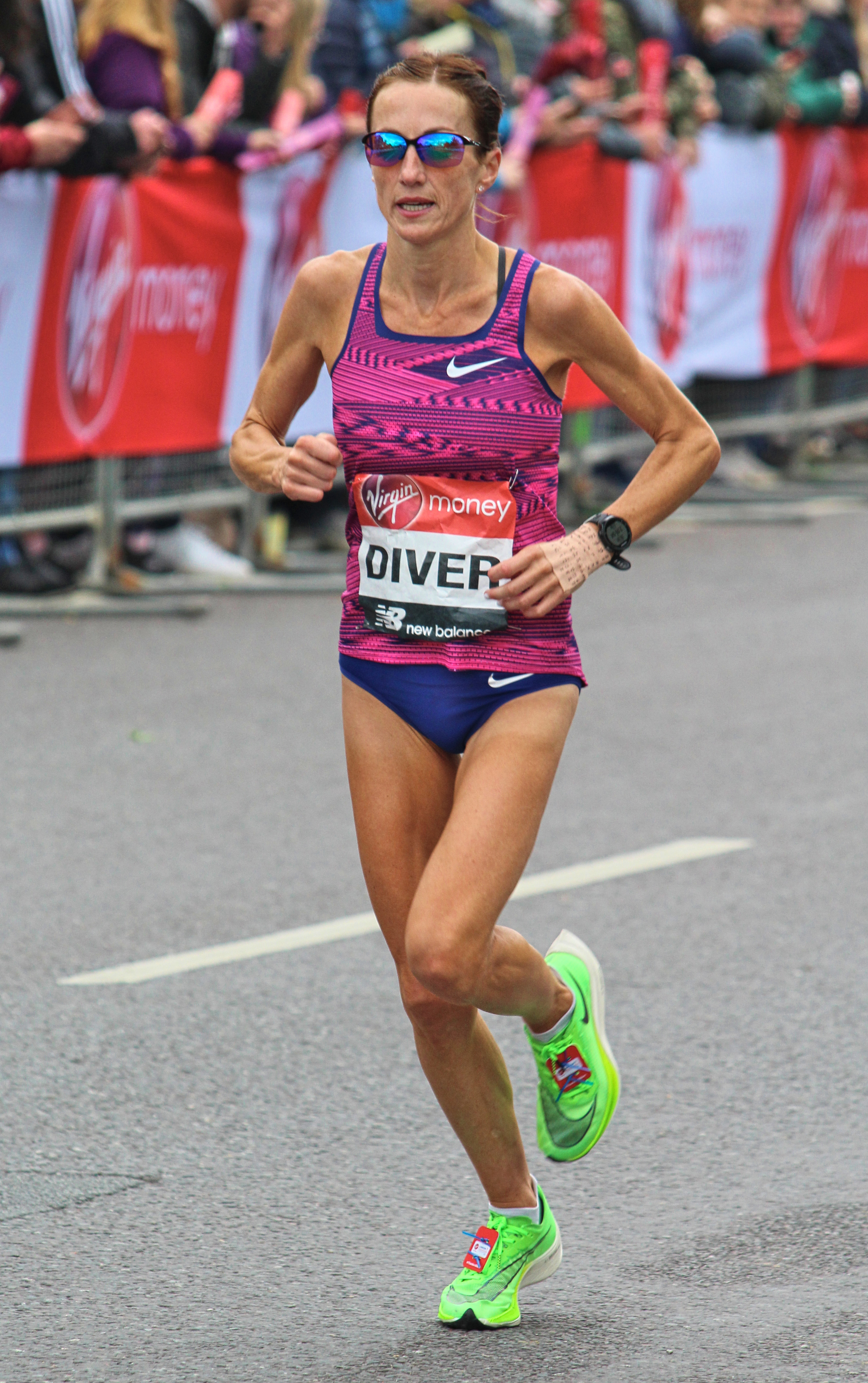
- Diver at the 2019 London Marathon

Personal information
- Nationality: Australian
- Born: 17 February 1977 (age 49) Belmullet, County Mayo, Ireland
- Education: University of Limerick
- Height: 1.65 m (5 ft 5 in)

Sport
- Country: Australia
- Sport: Track and field
- Event: Marathon

Achievements and titles
- Personal bests: 3000 m: 9:40.0 (2015); 5000 m: 15:23.65 (2018); 10,000 m: 31:25.49 (2019 IAAF World Championships); Half marathon: 1:08:50 (2020 Kagawa Marugame Half Marathon); Marathon: 2:21:34 AR (2022 Valencia Marathon)

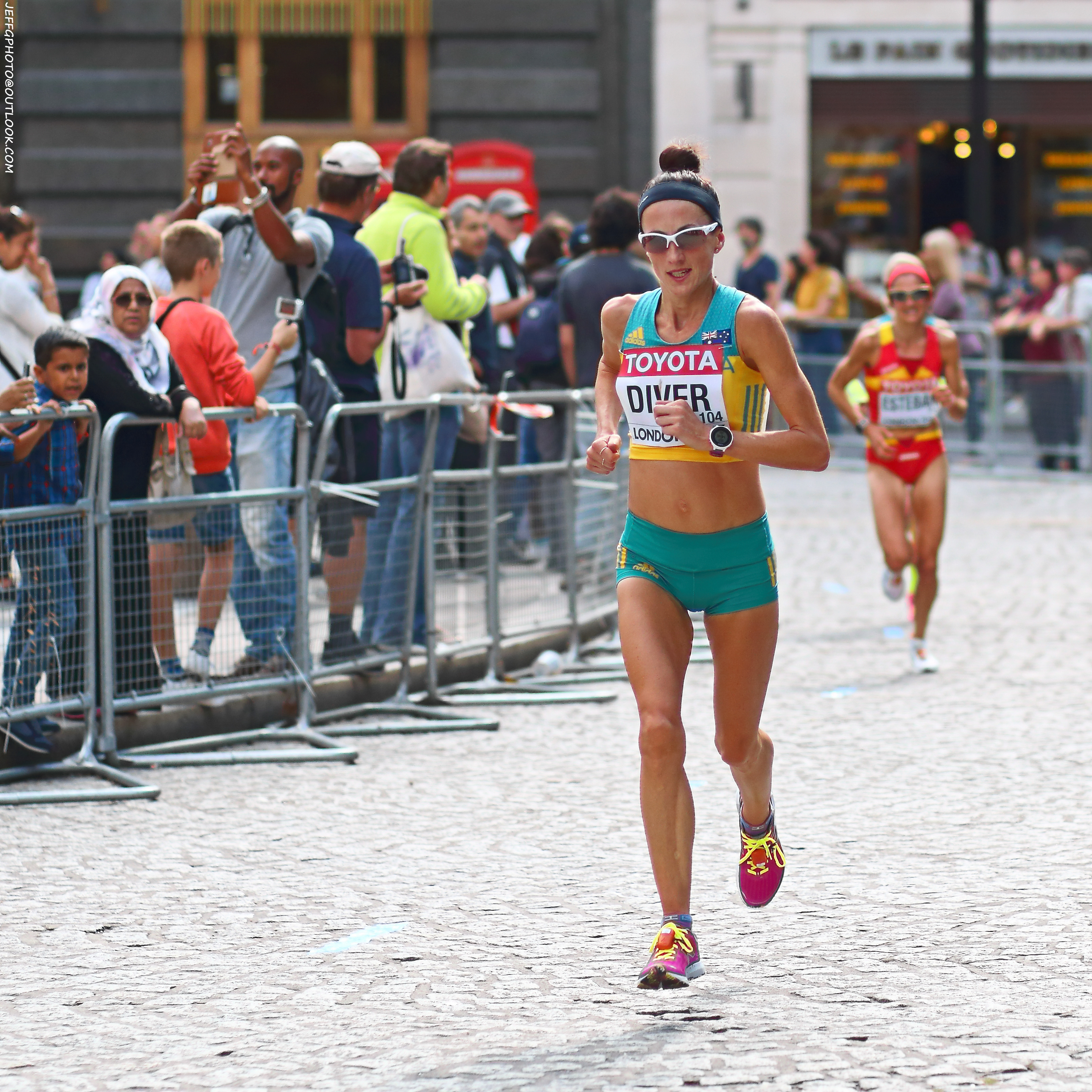
Diver on 2017 World Athletics Championship

Sinead Diver (/ʃɪˈneɪdˈdaɪvər/ shin-AYD-dih-ver, /ʃɪˈneɪdˈdɪvər/ shin-AYD-DY-ver born 17 February 1977) is an Irish-Australian long-distance runner.

== Biography ==
Diver was born and raised in County Mayo in Belmullet on the western coast of Ireland. She attended a conservative Catholic school in the small Irish town where academics were the priority and they didn't encourage girls to participate in athletics, aside from playing a little basketball at lunch. However, she persisted and still competed in soccer, basketball and swimming.

Because of her love of sports, she went on to study physical education and Irish teaching at the University of Limerick, followed by post-grad study in computing. She lived in Ireland until the age of 25, before moving to Melbourne, Australia in 2002.

== Career ==
Diver competed in the marathon event at both the 2015 World Championships in Athletics in Beijing and the 2017 World Championships in Athletics in London.

Having graduated from the University of Limerick with a degree in physical education and Irish language, Diver moved to Australia in 2002. She started running in 2010 at the age of 33 after the birth of her elder son. In 2012, she won the Australian Half Marathon Championship. Her debut marathon was the 2014 Melbourne Marathon, where she finished as the second-placed woman in a time of 2:34:15. She won the 2018 Melbourne Marathon in a time of 2:25:17. This time made Diver the fastest Australian female marathon runner aged 40+. She set a new personal best of 2:24:11 at the 2019 London Marathon where she was the seventh woman to finish. She was fourteenth in the 10,000 metres at the 2019 IAAF World Championships. Her time of 31:25.49 was an over-40s world record. She was fifth at the 2019 New York City Marathon in a time of 2:26:23 Diver was running 2020 Nagoya Women's Marathon as a pacemaker, helping Mao Ichiyama to set new course record and personal best.

She narrowly missed out to qualify for the 2016 Summer Olympics due to injury. She qualified to represent Australia at the 2020 Summer Olympics in women's marathon event at the age of 44 and became the oldest athletic competitor to represent Australia at the Olympics. She finished the event in 10th place. Her time of 2:31.14 was just under 4 minutes more than that set by the eventual winner, Peres Jepchirchir, of Kenya.

Diver ran a time of 2:21:34 at the 2022 Valencia Marathon, thus setting a new Australian and Continental record at age 45. Previous Australian record was 2:22:36 set by Benita Willis Johnson back in 2006.

== Personal life ==
Diver works as an IT consultant and has two children.

Diver also manages a popular running meme Instagram account, heapsgoodrunners.
