= Peres Jepchirchir =

Kenyan long-distance runner

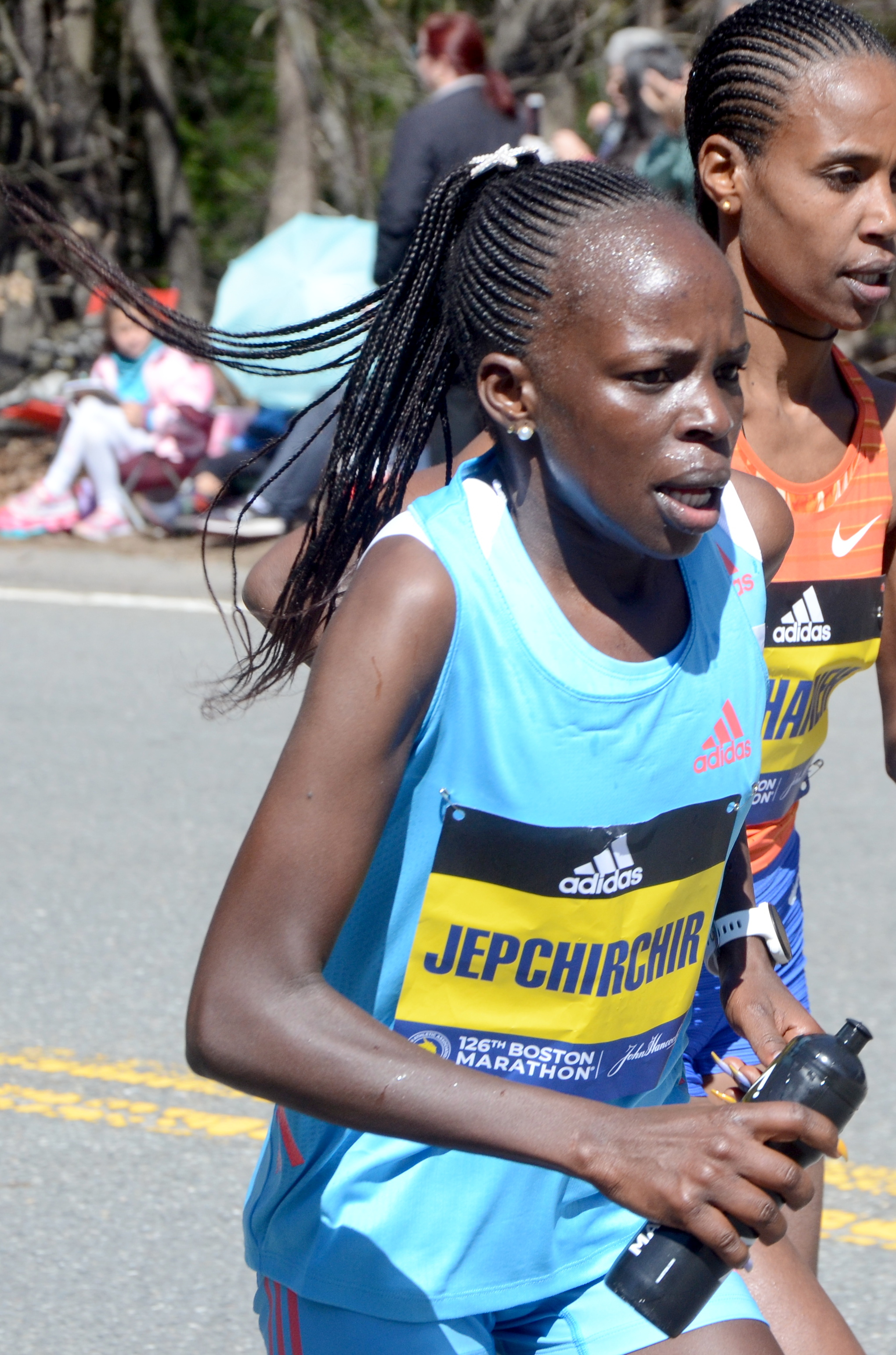
- Jepchirchir at the 2022 Boston Marathon

Personal information
- Nationality: Kenyan
- Born: 27 September 1993 (age 33) Turbo, Kenya

Sport
- Sport: Athletics
- Event: Long-distance running

Achievements and titles
- Personal bests: Half marathon: 1:05:06 (2017); Half marathon Wo: 1:05:16 WR (Gdynia 2020); Marathon Wo: 2:16:16 WR (London 2024)
Medal record
Women's athletics
Representing Kenya
Olympic Games
Gold medal – first place	2020 Tokyo	Marathon
World Championships
Gold medal – first place	2025 Tokyo	Marathon
World Half Marathon Championships
Gold medal – first place	2016 Cardiff	Individual
Gold medal – first place	2016 Cardiff	Team
Gold medal – first place	2020 Gdynia	Individual
Gold medal – first place	2023 Riga	Individual
Silver medal – second place	2020 Gdynia	Team
World Marathon Majors
Gold medal – first place	2021 New York	Marathon
Gold medal – first place	2022 Boston	Marathon
Gold medal – first place	2024 London	Marathon
Gold medal – first place	2026 Sydney	Marathon
Bronze medal – third place	2023 London	Marathon

Peres Jepchirchir (born 27 September 1993) is a Kenyan professional long-distance runner who competes mainly in road running competitions. She won the gold medal in the women's marathon at the 2020 Tokyo Olympics. Jepchirchir was the champion at the 2016 and 2020 World Half Marathon Championships. She claimed victories at the 2021 New York City and 2022 Boston Marathon and finished third at the 2023 London Marathon. She claimed a further victory at the 2024 London Marathon, finishing in two hours, 16 minutes and 16 seconds and breaking the women's only world record (that is, the world record for the fastest time by a female marathon runner without using male pace makers).

Her best time for the half marathon of 1:05:06, set on 10 February 2017 in the UAE, is a former half marathon world record. Until September 2026, she held the women's only half marathon world record of 1:05:16 set at the 2020 World Half Marathon Championships in Gdynia, Poland, which was an improvement on her own previous record.

On October 23, 2026, the Athletics Integrity Unit announced that Jepchirchir had been provisionally suspended after testing positive for Erithropoetin (EPO). She was given a three-year ban on 19 November, reduced from four years after admitting to the offence.

== Early life ==
Jepchirchir was born on a farm in Turbo, Kenya among 28 siblings, and her father had three wives. Her mother died when she was two years old, and she was adopted by an uncle and raised in Kamagut. She is a member of the Kalenjin people.

== Career ==
Jepchirchir ran track while at school and was spurred on by the achievements of fellow Kenyan Mary Keitany, who was a world half marathon champion at the time. After dropping out of high school at age 18 because she could not afford school fees, she began to pursue running as a career as a way out of poverty. She began to compete in road races in 2013, starting with two wins at 10K runs in South Africa, then a third-place finish at the Kisumu Marathon in her native Kenya, finishing the distance in 2:47:33 hours. She turned to cross country running at the start of 2014 and managed to take second place to Faith Kipyegon at the Kenyan Cross Country Championships – her first significant finish at national level.

Her talent was spotted by Gianni Demadonna's team and she began to earn invitations to high level European road races. She won three straight races in France in late 2014, winning the Le Lion Half Marathon (in a course record of 69:12 minutes), the Marseille-Cassis Classique Internationale, then the Corrida de Houilles. She was narrowly runner-up to Janet Kisa at the end-of-year BOclassic 5K.

She made her highest profile appearance yet at the 2015 London Marathon, but failed to build on her shorter distance achievements, as she could not finish the full marathon distance. However, she began to reach the peaks of road running in 10K and half marathon that year. Her best of 30:55 minutes at the Prague Grand Prix was the second fastest globally for the season and one week later she set a course record of 67:17 minutes to win the Ústí nad Labem Half Marathon – a time which placed her seventh on the year's top lists. She also defended her title in Marseille in October.

Jepchirchir set a new best of 66:39 minutes at the 2016 Ras Al Khaimah Half Marathon. Despite the fast time, which moved her to 13th on the all-time lists, the strength in depth of the race left her in fourth some way behind winner Cynthia Cherotich Limo while six women ran quicker than 67 minutes (a first for the sport). This performance earned her a place on the Kenyan team for the 2016 IAAF World Half Marathon Championships. The five-woman team led out the start of the race, with Ethiopia's Netsanet Gudeta and Genet Yalew also in contention. As the race progressed, this was whittled down to a Kenyan trio of Jepchirchir, Limo and Mary Wacera Ngugi, and this eventually resulted in a sprint finish between Limo and Jepchirchir. Despite having been among the least experienced and well-known of the Kenyan team, it was Jepchirchir who emerged as world champion, finishing the race in 67:31 minutes and leading the Kenyan women to the team title and a podium sweep with Limo and Ngugi.

A course record came at the Yangzhou Jianzhen International Half Marathon in April, with her run of 67:21 minutes. At the 2017 RAK Half Marathon she broke two world records. She took three seconds off Florence Kiplagat's half marathon record in 65:06 minutes and set the 20K world record at 61:40 minutes. Her position as the world's best was short-lived, however, as Joyciline Jepkosgei (third at the RAK race) broke both her world records the following month.

In the 2020 Summer Olympics, she won the gold medal in a time of 2:27.20, given to her by Thomas Bach. She won the 2021 New York City Marathon with a time of 2:22:39, becoming the first person to win the Olympic gold medal and the New York City Marathon in the same year. She won the 2022 Boston Marathon with a time of 2:21:02. Due to her hip injury, Jepchirchir had to miss the 2022 World Athletics Championships in Oregon.

She won the 2024 London Marathon, finishing in two hours, 16 minutes and 16 seconds and breaking the women's only world record (that is, the world record for the fastest time by a female marathon runner without using male pace makers).

In October 2026, the Athletics Integrity Unit announced that she had been provisionally suspended from competing due to testing positive for EPO. The sample was taken in July 2026 in Kenya, six weeks before her victory at the 2026 Sydney Marathon. She was given a three-year ban from the sport, and had her win at the Sydney Marathon annulled on 19 November. The ban is effective from 20 October 2026 and will expire on 20 October 2029.

== Achievements ==
=== Personal bests ===
- 5K run – 15:51 (Bolzano 2014)
- 10K run – 30:55 (Prague 2015)
- Half marathon – 1:05:06 (Ras Al Khaimah 2017)
- Half marathon Wo – 1:05:16 (Gdynia 2020) Wo World record
- Marathon – 2:16:16 (London 2024) Wo World record *Pending Ratification

=== International competitions ===
Representing Kenya
Year	Competition	Venue	Position	Event	Result
2016	World Half Marathon Championships	Cardiff, United Kingdom	1st	Half marathon	1:07:31
2016	World Half Marathon Championships	Cardiff, United Kingdom	1st	Team	3:22:59
2020	World Half Marathon Championships	Gdynia, Poland	1st	Half marathon	1:05:16 WR_{wo}
2020	World Half Marathon Championships	Gdynia, Poland	2nd	Team	3:18:10
2021	Olympic Games	Sapporo, Japan	1st	Marathon	2:27:20
2025	World Championships	Tokyo, Japan	1st	Marathon	2:24:43
World Marathon Majors
2021	New York Marathon	New York, NY, United States	1st	Marathon	2:22:39
2022	Boston Marathon	Boston, MA, United States	1st	Marathon	2:21:01
2023	London Marathon	London, United Kingdom	3rd	Marathon	2:18:38
2024	London Marathon	London, United Kingdom	1st	Marathon	2:16:16WR_{wo}*
2026	Sydney Marathon	Sydney, Australia	1st	Marathon	2:18:31

Notes:*Pending IAAF ratification.

=== Road race wins ===
- 2013: Durban 10K Cityrun (2)
- 2014: Montbéliard-Belfort Le Lion Half Marathon, Marseille-Cassis Classique Internationale 20K, Corrida de Houilles 10K
- 2015: Prague Grand Prix 10K, Ústí nad Labem Half Marathon, Marseille-Cassis Classique Internationale 20K
- 2016: Yangzhou Jianzhen International Half Marathon, Bangalore World 10K, Ottawa 10K, Ústí nad Labem Half Marathon, Valencia Half Marathon
- 2017: Ras Al Khaimah Half Marathon
- 2019: Portugal Half Marathon, Saitama International Marathon
- 2020: Prague Half Marathon, Valencia Marathon

Records
Preceded by (Kenya) Florence Kiplagat	Women's Half marathon World record holder 10 February 2017 – 1 April 2017	Succeeded by (Kenya) Joyciline Jepkosgei
