= 2016 IAAF World Half Marathon Championships =

- Host city: Cardiff, United Kingdom
- Nations: 49
- Athletes: 174
- Events: 2
- Dates: 26 March 2016
- Race length: 21.0975 km (13.1 mi)

The 2016 IAAF World Half Marathon Championships took place on 26 March 2016 in Cardiff, United Kingdom. It was the 22nd edition of the event and the 4th in the United Kingdom alone.

In conjunction with the men's elite race, an open half marathon was held on the same course for 16,000 competitors.

== Medallists ==
Event	Gold		Silver		Bronze	
Individual
Men	Geoffrey Kipsang Kamworor (KEN)	59:10	Bedan Karoki Muchiri (KEN)	59:36	Mohamed Farah (GBR)	59:59
Women	Peres Jechirchir (KEN)	1:07:31	Cynthia Jerotich Limo (KEN)	1:07:34	Mary Wacera Ngugi (KEN)	1:07:54
Team
Men	Kenya	2:58:58	Ethiopia	3:01:16	Eritrea	3:06:18
Women	Kenya	3:22:59	Ethiopia	3:26:29	Japan	3:32:25

== Race results ==
Results for the men's and women's elite races are shown below. Results for the open race are kept separately.

=== Men ===
Rank	Athlete	Nationality	Time	Notes
1st place, gold medalist(s)	Geoffrey Kipsang Kamworor	Kenya	59:10	SB
2nd place, silver medalist(s)	Bedan Karoki Muchiri	Kenya	59:36	SB
3rd place, bronze medalist(s)	Mo Farah	Great Britain	59:59	SB
4	Abayneh Ayele	Ethiopia	59:59	PB
5	Tamirat Tola	Ethiopia	1:00:06	PB
6	Simon Cheprot	Kenya	1:00:12	SB
7	Abrar Osman	Eritrea	1:00:58	SB
8	Mule Wasihun	Ethiopia	1:01:11	SB
9	Edwin Kiprop Kiptoo	Kenya	1:01:21	
10	Stephen Mokoka	South Africa	1:01:27	SB
11	Teshome Mekonen	Ethiopia	1:01:39	SB
12	Edwin Kipyego	Kenya	1:01:52	
13	Nguse Amlosom	Eritrea	1:01:54	
14	Paul Pollock	Ireland	1:02:46	SB
15	Callum Hawkins	Great Britain	1:02:51	
16	Guye Adola	Ethiopia	1:03:26	
17	Hiskel Tewelde	Eritrea	1:03:26	SB
18	Ayad Lamdassem	Spain	1:03:29	SB
19	Sidi-Hassan Chahdi	France	1:03:30	SB
20	Michael Shelley	Australia	1:03:33	SB
21	Robert Chemonges	Uganda	1:03:39	PB
22	Naoki Kudo	Japan	1:03:41	
23	Timothy Ritchie	United States	1:03:49	SB
24	Samsom Gebreyohannes	Eritrea	1:04:03	
25	Stefano La Rosa	Italy	1:04:05	SB
26	Jared Ward	United States	1:04:05	SB
27	Dewi Griffiths	Great Britain	1:04:10	PB
28	Minato Oishi	Japan	1:04:11	
29	Keijiro Mogi	Japan	1:04:19	
30	Jhordan Alonso Ccope	Peru	1:04:23	SB
31	Asbjørn Ellefsen Persen	Norway	1:04:32	
32	Scott Bauhs	United States	1:04:34	
33	Mariano Mastromarino	Argentina	1:04:35	PB
34	Wellington da Silva	Brazil	1:04:43	SB
35	Keisuke Nakatani	Japan	1:04:43	
36	Shogo Nakamura	Japan	1:04:49	
37	Mbongeni Ngxazozo	South Africa	1:04:51	SB
38	Reid Coolsaet	Canada	1:04:56	SB
39	Raverso Ramos	Peru	1:04:59	PB
40	Ricardo Ramos	Mexico	1:05:00	
41	Thomas Frazer	Ireland	1:05:20	PB
42	Kevin Seaward	Ireland	1:05:23	SB
43	Denis Mayaud	France	1:05:48	SB
44	Ferdinand Pacheco	Peru	1:06:05	SB
45	Ryan McLeod	Great Britain	1:06:13	SB
46	Rob Watson	Canada	1:06:15	
47	Diego Colorado	Colombia	1:06:16	SB
48	Nicolae-Alexandru Soare	Romania	1:06:18	SB
49	Lars Budolfsen	Denmark	1:06:28	SB
50	Sergiu Ciobanu	Ireland	1:06:30	SB
51	Daniel Vargas	Mexico	1:06:32	SB
52	Nelson Ito	Peru	1:06:34	SB
53	Matthew Hynes	Great Britain	1:06:37	SB
54	Gerald Giraldo	Colombia	1:06:39	PB
55	Tesama Moogas	Israel	1:06:41	
56	Ben Bruce	United States	1:06:46	
57	Kári Steinn Karlsson	Iceland	1:06:49	SB
58	Juraj Vitko	Slovakia	1:06:50	SB
59	Yolo Nikolov	Bulgaria	1:06:52	PB
60	Jesper Faurschou	Denmark	1:06:53	SB
61	Vuyisile Tshoba	South Africa	1:06:55	
62	Romain Courcières	France	1:07:02	
63	Janis Viskers	Latvia	1:07:34	SB
64	Theis Nijhuis	Denmark	1:07:49	SB
65	Danmuzhenciwang	China	1:07:52	PB
66	Rui Yong Soh	Singapore	1:07:56	SB
67	Arnar Pétursson	Iceland	1:08:02	PB
68	Djamel Bachiri	France	1:08:09	
69	Dmytro Lashyn	Ukraine	1:08:49	SB
70	Daniel Daly	Croatia	1:08:51	SB
71	Paul Lalire	France	1:08:58	SB
72	Shokhrukh Davlatov	Uzbekistan	1:09:56	PB
73	Zhoodar Kochkonbaev	Kyrgyzstan	1:10:07	PB
74	Marcel Tschopp	Liechtenstein	1:10:48	SB
75	Brandon Lord	Canada	1:11:00	
76	Hussein Ahmed	Egypt	1:11:21	PB
77	Belal Ahmed	Egypt	1:11:29	PB
78	Saby Luna	Mexico	1:11:32	SB
79	Gladwin Mzazi	South Africa	1:11:49	SB
80	Charlton Debono	Malta	1:12:03	
81	Kuan Un Iao	Macau	1:13:55	PB
82	Modike Lucky Mohale	South Africa	1:15:28	
83	Abdi Madar Amare	Somalia	1:15:53	PB
84	Elsidig Ibrahim	Sudan	1:17:07	SB
85	Armann Eydal Albertsson	Iceland	1:17:22	SB
—	Sean Hehir	Ireland	DQ	R143.11
—	David Nilsson	Sweden	DNS	
—	Patrick Muleki	DR Congo	DNS	

=== Women ===
Rank	Athlete	Nationality	Time	Notes
1st place, gold medalist(s)	Peres Jechirchir	Kenya	1:07:31	
2nd place, silver medalist(s)	Cynthia Jerotich Limo	Kenya	1:07:34	
3rd place, bronze medalist(s)	Mary Wacera Ngugi	Kenya	1:07:54	
4	Netsanet Gudeta	Ethiopia	1:08:01	SB
5	Genet Yalew	Ethiopia	1:08:15	
6	Gladys Chesir Kiptagelai	Kenya	1:08:46	
7	Pascalia Chepkorir Kipkoech	Kenya	1:09:44	SB
8	Dehininet Demsew	Ethiopia	1:10:13	PB
9	Gladys Tejeda	Peru	1:10:14	AR
10	Yuka Ando	Japan	1:10:34	
11	Janet Cherobon-Bawcom	United States	1:10:46	SB
12	Eloise Wellings	Australia	1:10:47	
13	Milly Clark	Australia	1:10:48	PB
14	Miho Shimizu	Japan	1:10:51	
15	Sara Hall	United States	1:10:58	
16	Veronica Inglese	Italy	1:10:59	SB
17	Mizuki Matsuda	Japan	1:11:00	
18	Cassie Fien	Australia	1:11:13	PB
19	Kellys Arias	Colombia	1:11:21	PB
20	Lanni Marchant	Canada	1:11:26	SB
21	Vianey de la Rosa	Mexico	1:11:52	PB
22	Margarita Hernández	Mexico	1:11:56	PB
23	Tarah Korir	Canada	1:12:04	PB
24	Askale Alemayehu	Ethiopia	1:12:28	SB
25	Kellyn Taylor	United States	1:12:42	SB
26	Laurane Picoche	France	1:12:43	SB
27	Alyson Dixon	Great Britain	1:12:57	SB
28	Brianne Nelson	United States	1:13:01	SB
29	Sinke Dessie	Ethiopia	1:13:12	PB
30	Angie Orjuela	Colombia	1:13:16	SB
31	Souad Aït Salem	Algeria	1:13:18	
32	Jovana de la Cruz	Peru	1:13:19	PB
33	Charlotte Purdue	Great Britain	1:13:20	SB
34	Laura Batterink	Canada	1:13:24	SB
35	Paula-Claudia Todoran	Romania	1:13:27	SB
36	Hisami Ishii	Japan	1:13:41	
37	Nolene Conrad	South Africa	1:13:45	SB
38	Rosaria Console	Italy	1:13:45	
39	Anna Incerti	Italy	1:14:00	SB
40	Kit-Ching Yiu	Hong Kong	1:14:19	SB
41	Lebogang Phalula	South Africa	1:14:21	SB
42	Cornelia Joubert	South Africa	1:14:23	SB
43	Kenza Dahmani Tifahi	Algeria	1:14:33	SB
44	Cuomu Ciren	China	1:14:37	PB
45	Valdilene Silva	Brazil	1:14:38	PB
46	Mariya Korobitskaya	Kyrgyzstan	1:14:46	PB
47	Ángela Figueroa	Colombia	1:14:46	PB
48	Laila Soufyane	Italy	1:15:05	
49	Tina Muir	Great Britain	1:15:12	SB
50	Brenda Flores	Mexico	1:15:19	
51	María Peralta	Argentina	1:15:21	PB
52	Lizzie Lee	Ireland	1:15:36	SB
53	Marta Galimany	Spain	1:15:37	
54	Fanny Pruvost	France	1:15:37	
55	Louise Langelund Batting	Denmark	1:15:41	PB
56	Carmen Patricia Martínez	Paraguay	1:15:44	NR
57	Severine Hamel	France	1:15:53	SB
58	Samira Mezeghrane	France	1:16:08	SB
59	Paula Mayobre	Spain	1:16:13	
60	Luz Mery Rojas	Peru	1:16:13	PB
61	Hillary Montgomery	United States	1:16:16	
62	Katarina Bérešová	Slovakia	1:16:20	SB
63	Rachel Felton	Great Britain	1:16:36	
64	Marta Esteban	Spain	1:16:52	
65	Militsa Mircheva	Bulgaria	1:16:54	SB
66	Andreea-Alina Pîscu	Romania	1:17:07	PB
67	Ariana Kira Hilborna	Latvia	1:17:11	SB
68	Mirai Waku	Japan	1:17:30	SB
69	Wangmu Nuzeng	China	1:17:35	SB
70	Jila Dawa	China	1:17:52	PB
71	Chien-Ho Hsieh	Chinese Taipei	1:18:00	
72	Nicolasa Condori	Peru	1:18:21	SB
73	Karine Pasquier	France	1:18:24	SB
74	Tonya Nero	Trinidad and Tobago	1:19:53	SB
75	Irina Moroz	Uzbekistan	1:22:47	PB
76	Dina Lebo Phalula	South Africa	1:23:49	SB
77	Emma Montiel	Gibraltar	1:25:51	SB
78	Zintle Xiniwe	South Africa	1:26:30	SB
79	Long Hoi	Macau	1:28:37	SB
80	Allison Edwards	Gibraltar	1:32:08	SB
—	Jenny Spink	Great Britain	DNF	
—	Alessandra Aguilar	Spain	DNF	
—	Silvia La Barbera	Italy	DNF	
—	Amal Mohammed	Iraq	DNS	
—	Rutendo Joan Nyahora	Zimbabwe	DNS	
—	Olha Skrypak	Ukraine	DNS	

== Team standings ==
The men's and women's team standings are shown below.

=== Men ===
Rank	Country	Athletes	Time
1st place, gold medalist(s)	Kenya	Geoffrey Kipsang Kamworor; Bedan Karoki Muchiri; Simon Cheprot	2:58:58
2nd place, silver medalist(s)	Ethiopia	Abayneh Ayele; Tamirat Tola; Mule Wasihun	3:01:16
3rd place, bronze medalist(s)	Eritrea	Abrar Osman; Nguse Amlosom; Hiskel Tewelde	3:06:18
4	Great Britain	Mohamed Farah; Callum Hawkins; Dewi Griffiths	3:07:00
5	Japan	Naoki Kudo; Minato Oishi; Keijiro Mogi	3:12:11
6	United States	Timothy Ritchie; Jared Ward; Scott Bauhs	3:12:28
7	South Africa	Stephen Mokoka; Mbongeni Ngxazozo; Vuyisile Tshoba	3:13:13
8	Ireland	Paul Pollock; Thomas Frazer; Kevin Seaward	3:13:29
9	Peru	Jhordan Alonso Ccope; Raverso Ramos; Ferdinand Pacheco	3:15:27
10	France	Sidi-Hassan Chahdi; Denis Mayaud; Romain Courcières	3:16:20
11	Denmark	Lars Budolfsen; Jesper Faurschou; Theis Nijhuis	3:21:10
12	Canada	Reid Coolsaet; Rob Watson; Brandon Lord	3:22:11
13	Mexico	Ricardo Ramos; Daniel Vargas; Saby Luna	3:23:04
14	Iceland	Kári Steinn Karlsson; Arnar Pétursson; Armann Eydal Albertsson	3:32:13

=== Women ===
Rank	Country	Athletes	Time
1st place, gold medalist(s)	Kenya	Peres Jechirchir; Cynthia Jerotich Limo; Mary Wacera Ngugi	3:22:59
2nd place, silver medalist(s)	Ethiopia	Netsanet Gudeta; Genet Yalew; Dehininet Demsew	3:26:29
3rd place, bronze medalist(s)	Japan	Yuka Ando; Miho Shimizu; Mizuki Matsuda	3:32:25
4	Australia	Eloise Wellings; Milly Clark; Cassie Fien	3:32:48
5	United States	Janet Cherobon-Bawcom; Sara Hall; Kellyn Taylor	3:34:26
6	Canada	Lanni Marchant; Tarah Korir; Laura Batterink	3:36:54
7	Italy	Veronica Inglese; Rosaria Console; Anna Incerti	3:38:44
8	Mexico	Vianey de la Rosa; Margarita Hernández; Brenda Flores	3:39:07
9	Colombia	Kellys Arias; Angie Orjuela; Ángela Figueroa	3:39:23
10	Peru	Gladys Tejeda; Jovana de la Cruz; Luz Mery Rojas	3:39:46
11	Great Britain	Alyson Dixon; Charlotte Purdue; Tina Muir	3:41:29
12	South Africa	Nolene Conrad; Lebogang Phalula; Cornelia Joubert	3:42:29
13	France	Laurane Picoche; Fanny Pruvost; Severine Hamel	3:44:13
14	Spain	Marta Galimany; Paula Mayobre; Marta Esteban	3:48:42
15	China	Cuomu Ciren; Wangmu Nuzeng; Jila Dawa	3:50:04

== Medal table (unofficial) ==
Rank	Nation	Gold	Silver	Bronze	Total
1	Kenya	4	2	1	7
2	Ethiopia	0	2	0	2
3	Eritrea	0	0	1	1
3	Great Britain	0	0	1	1
3	Japan	0	0	1	1
Totals (5 entries)		4	4	4	12

== Participation ==
An unofficial count yields the participation of 174 athletes from 49 countries. Although announced, the athletes from Djibouti and Sri Lanka did not show.

- Algeria (2)
- Argentina (2)
- Australia (4)
- Brazil (2)
- Bulgaria (2)
- Canada (6)
- China (4)
- Chinese Taipei (1)
- Colombia (5)
- Croatia (1)
- Democratic Republic of the Congo (1)
- Denmark (4)
- Egypt (2)
- Eritrea (4)
- Ethiopia (10)
- France (10)
- Gibraltar (2)
- Great Britain (10)
- Hong Kong (1)
- Iceland (3)
- Iraq (1)
- Ireland (6)
- Israel (1)
- Italy (6)
- Japan (10)
- Kenya (10)
- Kyrgyzstan (2)
- Latvia (2)
- Liechtenstein (1)
- Macau (2)
- Malta (1)
- Mexico (6)
- Norway (1)
- Paraguay (1)
- Peru (8)
- Romania (3)
- Singapore (1)
- Slovakia (2)
- Somalia (1)
- South Africa (10)
- Spain (5)
- Sudan (1)
- Sweden (1)
- Trinidad and Tobago (1)
- Uganda (1)
- Ukraine (2)
- United States (9)
- Uzbekistan (2)
- Zimbabwe (1)

== See also ==
- 2016 in athletics (track and field)
