= Abayneh Ayele =

Ethiopian long-distance runner

Medal record

Men's athletics

Representing Ethiopia

All-Africa Games
Bronze medal – third place	2011 Maputo	5000 m

IAAF World Half Marathon Championships
Silver medal – second place	2016 Cardiff	Team

Abayneh Ayele Woldegiorgis (born 4 November 1987) is an Ethiopian long-distance runner who competes mainly in road running events. He holds a marathon best of 2:06:45 hours and a half marathon best of 59:59 minutes. He was a bronze medallist in the 5000 metres at the 2011 All-Africa Games and placed fourth at the 2016 IAAF World Half Marathon Championships.

== Career ==
Abayneh began competing on the European road circuit in 2010 and quickly had success, winning the Istanbul 15K. He ranked in the top eight of the Delhi Half Marathon with a time of 60:51 minutes. He switched to track running in the 2011 and had wins at the Cezmi Or Memorial and the Sotteville Pro Athlé Tour meet. He was chosen for Ethiopia at the 2011 All-Africa Games and won a 5000 metres bronze medal, finishing behind Uganda's Moses Kipsiro and a younger compatriot Yenew Alamirew.

Abayneh struggled in the 2012 season, failing to improve his track bests and missed competitions for almost a year after July. He was based in Japan for most of the 2013 and 2014 seasons, having successful outings on ekiden relay teams. He won the 5000 m at the Oda Memorial, was third at the Gifu Seiryu Half Marathon on two occasions and set a 10,000 metres track best of 27:57.51 minutes.

A switch to marathon running at the start of 2015 marked a resurgence of his career. On his debut for the distance at the Rotterdam Marathon he finished fourth with a time of 2:09:21 hours. After a win at the lower level Lanzhou International Marathon, he returned to the Netherlands and again finished fourth, improving to 2:07:16 hours at the Eindhoven Marathon. Another best time followed at the 2016 Dubai Marathon, where he crossed the line in 2:06:45 hours for sixth.

His second international call-up came for the 2016 IAAF World Half Marathon Championships and he was among the leaders of the race before falling back into third, then fourth position behind Olympic champion Mo Farah after a sprint finish for the bronze medal. His finishing time of 59:59 minutes was a new best (in spite of rainy conditions) and meant that he led the Ethiopians to the team silver medals, alongside Tamirat Tola and Mule Wasihun.

== International competitions ==
Year	Competition	Venue	Position	Event	Notes
2011	All-Africa Games	Maputo, Mozambique	3rd	5000 m	13:43.51
2016	World Half Marathon Championships	Cardiff, United Kingdom	4th	Half marathon	59:59
2016	World Half Marathon Championships	Cardiff, United Kingdom	2nd	Team	3:01:16

== Personal bests ==
- 3000 metres – 7:49.25 min (2011)
- 5000 metres – 13:11.01 min (2011)
- 10,000 metres – 27:57.51 min (2013)
- 10K run – 28:02 min (2016)
- Half marathon – 59:59 min (2016)
- Marathon – 2:06:45 hrs (2016)
