= Mule Wasihun =

Ethiopian long-distance runner

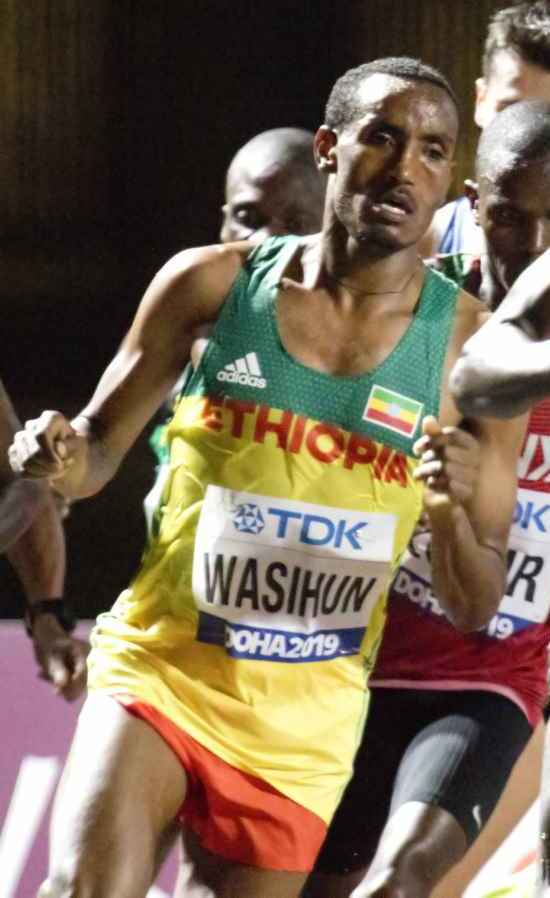
- Wasihun at the 2019 World Athletics Championships in Doha

Personal information
- Full name: Mule Wasihun Lakew
- Nationality: Ethiopian
- Born: 20 October 1993 (age 32)

Sport
- Country: Ethiopia
- Sport: Athletics
- Event: Long-distance running
- Team: NN Running Team
Medal record
Men's athletics
Representing Ethiopia
World Half Marathon Championships
Silver medal – second place	2016 Cardiff	Team

Mule Wasihun Lakew (born 20 October 1993) is an Ethiopian long-distance runner who competes in road running events up to the marathon distance. He was a team silver medallist at the 2016 IAAF World Half Marathon Championships. Mule placed third at the 2019 London Marathon. He holds a marathon best of 2:03:16 hours.

Mule is currently part of the NN Running Team, an international team of elite long-distance runners managed by Global Sports Communication in Nijmegen, Netherlands.

== Career ==
Mule first began competing abroad in 2013. He entered a series of races in France and set a best of 1:00:35 minutes for third at the Nice Half Marathon and won the Paris-Versailles and Marseille-Cassis Classique Internationale races. He took victory at the Paris Half Marathon the following year and defended his Paris-Versailles title, though he was beaten into second in Marseille by Titus Mbishei.

He made his marathon debut at the 2015 Dubai Marathon, though was some way off the winners with 2:10:57 hours in eleventh. He was runner-up at that year's Zevenheuvelenloop. After a win at the Ethiopian Athletics Championships, Mule made his international debut at the 2015 African Games, running the 10,000 metres. He finished in seventh, almost a minute behind winner Tsebelu Zewude, his compatriot.

A big improvement came at the 2016 Dubai Marathon – Mule rounded off an Ethiopian sweep of the top six places with a time of 2:05:44 hours (moving him into the top ten fastest for the year). After a runner-up finish at the Ethiopian Half Marathon Championships he was selected for the 2016 IAAF World Half Marathon Championships. He won his first international medal there, taking eighth place and helping Ethiopia to the men's team silver medal alongside Abayneh Ayele and Tamirat Tola. Mule suffered an unfortunate race at the World 10K Bangalore: he was directed the wrong way while in the lead and upon tracking back was chased by a stray dog on the course. He ended the race in ninth. In October Mule was 9th at the Amsterdam Marathon in 2:07:19.

In 2017, Mule returned to the Dubai Marathon, where he finished second place in a time of 2:06:46; the race was won by compatriot Tamirat Tola in 2:04:11. Mule also returned to the Amsterdam Marathon, where he finished 4th in 2:05:39.

Mule won his first race of 2018, setting a new course record of 59:44 at the eDreams Mitja Marato de Barcelona on 11 February. His time beat the previous course record of Kenya's Eliud Kipchoge by 20 seconds. He raced his first marathon of 2018 at the Rotterdam Marathon, where he finished in 6th place in a time of 2:08:13. Mule then raced the Amsterdam Marathon in October, finishing second in 2:04:37. The race was won by Kenya's Lawrence Cherono in 2:04:06.

In 2019, Mule was 6th in the RAK Half Marathon in February, clocking a new personal best time of 59:34. He competed in the 2019 London Marathon on 28 April, where he finished 3rd in a time of 2:03:16. Mule dropped off the pace being set by Eliud Kipchoge in the closing stages of the race, however he still recorded a personal best time, making him the 13th fastest marathon runner of all time, and the fastest ever 3rd-place finish in a marathon. Kipchoge went on to win the race in a course record time of 2:02:37. Mule competed in the men's marathon at the 2019 World Athletics Championships held in Doha, Qatar. He did not finish his race. Mule's next race was at the NN Zevenheuvelenloop 15 km in Nijmegen, Netherlands, where he finished 8th in a time of 43:03.

In 2020, Mule returned to the United Arab Emirates, where he raced the RAK Half Marathon on 21 February. He placed 3rd in a time of 59:47. His next race was at the 2020 London Marathon on 4 October, where he finished 5th in 2:06:08; the race was won by compatriot Shura Kitata.

== International competitions ==
Representing Ethiopia
Year	Competition	Venue	Position	Event	Notes
2015	African Games	Brazzaville, Congo	7th	10,000 m	28:23.87
2016	World Half Marathon Championships	Cardiff, United Kingdom	8th	Half marathon	1:01:11
2016	World Half Marathon Championships	Cardiff, United Kingdom	2nd	Team	3:01:16
2019	London Marathon	London, United Kingdom	3rd	Marathon	2:03:16
2019	World Championships	Doha, Qatar	–	Marathon	DNF

== National titles ==
- Ethiopian Athletics Championships
  - 10,000 metres: 2015
