= Athletics at the 2011 All-Africa Games – Men's 5000 metres =

The men's 5000 metres event at the 2011 All-Africa Games was held on 15 September.

== Results ==
Rank	Name	Nationality	Time	Notes
1st place, gold medalist(s)	Moses Ndiema Kipsiro	Uganda	13:43.08	
2nd place, silver medalist(s)	Yenew Alamirew	Ethiopia	13:43.33	
3rd place, bronze medalist(s)	Abayneh Ayele	Ethiopia	13:43.51	
4	Vincent Yator	Kenya	13:43.52	
5	Osman Yahya	Sudan	13:44.06	
6	Jacob Chesari	Kenya	13:44.18	
7	Mumin Gala	Djibouti	13:45.28	
8	Youssouf His Bachir	Djibouti	13:45.61	
9	Robert Kajuga	Rwanda	13:48.50	
10	Rabah Aboud	Algeria	13:50.56	
11	Ahmed Abaidalla	Sudan	13:51.11	
12	Tony Wamulwa	Zambia	13:52.65	
13	Mark Kiptoo	Kenya	13:54.27	
14	Berhane Tsegay	Eritrea	13:54.68	
15	Abdel Munaim Yahya	Sudan	14:11.23	
16	Fabiano Sulle	Tanzania	14:11.99	
17	Jean Marie Uwajeneza	Rwanda	14:24.93	
18	Godfrey Rutayisire	Rwanda	14:26.30	
19	Jobo Khataoune	Lesotho	14:46.69	
20	Hugues Kombila	Gabon	16:12.00	
21	Christian Ngniza	Gabon	16:25.46	
