= Brianne Nelson =

American long-distance runner

Brianne Nelson (born October 27, 1980) is an American long-distance runner active from 2011–2018. Nelson competed at the 2016 IAAF World Half Marathon Championships where she placed 28th, and participated in the US Olympic Marathon trials. She represented the U.S. at the Great Edinburgh International Cross Country championship.

She is a graduate of Fort Lewis College.

Nelson had numerous podium finishes at U.S. road running championships at various distances. She is also a multiple-time winner of the Great Cow Harbor 10K.
