= Rabah Aboud =

Algerian runner

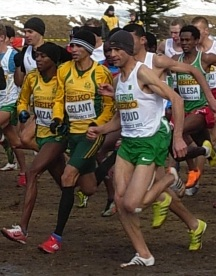
- Rabah Aboud (right) at the 2013 IAAF World Cross Country Championships

Personal information
- Nationality: Algeria
- Born: 1 January 1981 (age 45) Tissemsilt, Algeria
- Height: 1.80 m (5 ft 11 in)
- Weight: 64 kg (141 lb)

Sport
- Sport: Athletics
- Events: Cross country, 5000 m
Medal record
Representing Algeria
Men's athletics
Mediterranean Games
Gold medal – first place	2013 Mersin	5000 m

Rabah Aboud (Arabic: رابح عبود ; born 1 January 1981 at Tissemsilt) is an Algerian Athlete long-distance and cross country runner.

== Competition record ==
Year	Competition	Venue	Position	Event	Notes
Representing Algeria
2000	World Cross Country Championships	Vilamoura, Portugal	39th	Junior race	
2005	World Cross Country Championships	Saint-Galmier, France	23rd	Short race	
2006	World Cross Country Championships	Fukuoka, Japan	52nd	Short race	
2008	World Cross Country Championships	Edinburgh, United Kingdom	97th	Senior race	
2011	World Cross Country Championships	Punta Umbría, Spain	20th	Senior race	
2011	World Championships	Daegu, South Korea	29th (h)	5000 m	14:00.34
2011	All-Africa Games	Maputo, Mozambique	10th	5000 m	13:50.56
2011	Pan Arab Games	Doha, Qatar	–	10,000 m	DNF
2012	Olympic Games	London, United Kingdom	21st (h)	5000 m	13:28.38
2013	Mediterranean Games	Mersin, Turkey	1st	5000 m	13:38:01
2013	Islamic Solidarity Games	Palembang, Indonesia	5th	5000 m	14:48.48
2022	Mediterranean Games	Oran, Algeria	–	Half marathon	DNF
