= 2019 London Marathon =

39th running of the London marathon

39th London Marathon
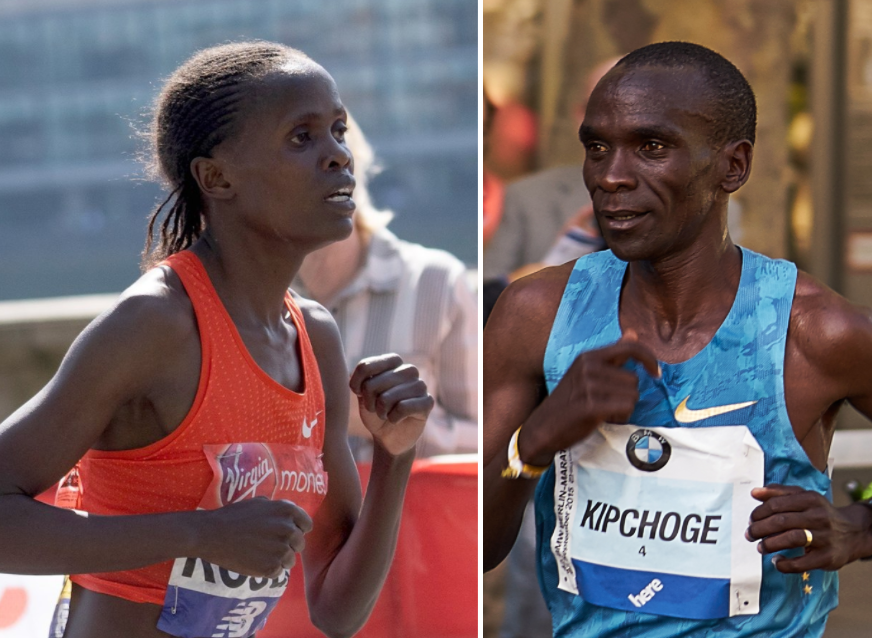
- Brigid Kosgei, winner of the women's race. Eliud Kipchoge, winner of the men's race.
- Venue: London, United Kingdom
- Date: 28 April 2019

Champions
- Men: Eliud Kipchoge (2:02:37)
- Women: Brigid Kosgei (2:18:20)
- Wheelchair men: Daniel Romanchuk (1:33:38)
- Wheelchair women: Manuela Schär (1:44:09)

The 2019 London Marathon was the 39th running of the annual marathon race in London, United Kingdom, which took place on 28 April. The elite men's race was won by Kenyan Eliud Kipchoge, who took his fourth London Marathon victory in a time of 2:02:37, the second fastest marathon ever at that point. The women's race was won by Brigid Kosgei, also of Kenya, in 2:18:20. American Daniel Romanchuk won the men's wheelchair title in 1:33:38 while Switzerland's Manuela Schär won the women's title in 1:44:09. Changes were made to the course to make it more environmentally friendly; the number of plastic bottles used was reduced and biodegradable alternatives were used instead.

== Course ==
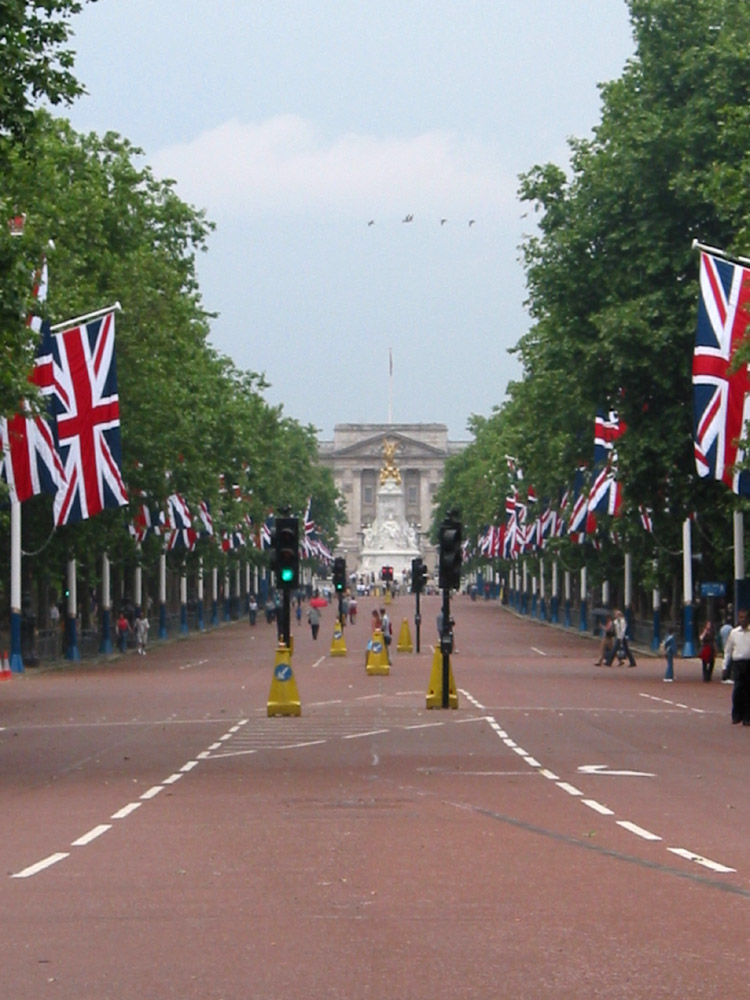
The Mall, the location of the finish of the race.

The marathon distance is officially 42.195 kilometres (26.219 mi) long as sanctioned by World Athletics (IAAF). The London Marathon is run over a mainly flat course, starting in Blackheath. The course begins at four separate points and they converge after 4 kilometres (2.5 mi) during which the course is downhill. At just after 10 kilometres (6.2 mi) into the race, the runners reach the 19th-century clipper Cutty Sark docked in Greenwich and at about halfway into the race, the runners cross Tower Bridge before heading east into Shadwell and Canary Wharf. After winding through Canary Wharf, the route returns through Shadwell on the other side of the road to which it entered before passing through Tower Hill. The runners enter the underpass in Blackfriars before running along the Thames Embankment, past Westminster and onto Birdcage Walk. The course then runs parallel to St James's Park before turning onto The Mall and finishing in front of Buckingham Palace.

== Field ==
The favourite for the men's race was Eliud Kipchoge, winner of the 2015, 2016, and 2018 editions. Abraham Kiptum was due to race but did not compete due to a biological passport violation, and was later suspended in November for an anti-doping violation. A much anticipated appearance was from Briton Mo Farah despite being an underdog and the bookmaker's second favourite pick. Shura Kitata, runner-up in the 2018 edition, also competed.

In the women's race, defending champion Vivian Cheruiyot and three-time London Marathon winner Mary Keitany were favourites. David Weir was favourite in the men's wheelchair race, having won a total of eight editions of the race. 2018 winner Madison de Rozario raced along with five-time New York City Marathon winner Tatyana McFadden, and Manuela Schär in the women's wheelchair race.

The wheelchair race started at 9:05 BST (UTC+1), the women's race at 9:25 BST, and the men's race at 10:10 BST. A new competition, the Flying 400, was introduced in the wheelchair race. It consisted of a 400 metres (1,300 ft) sprint at the 20 kilometres (12 mi) mark, with the winner receiving $8,000 and second place receiving $3,800 for both the men and women's race. In the other races, the winner received £42,000, with second and third winning £23,000 and £17,000, respectively.

== Race summary ==
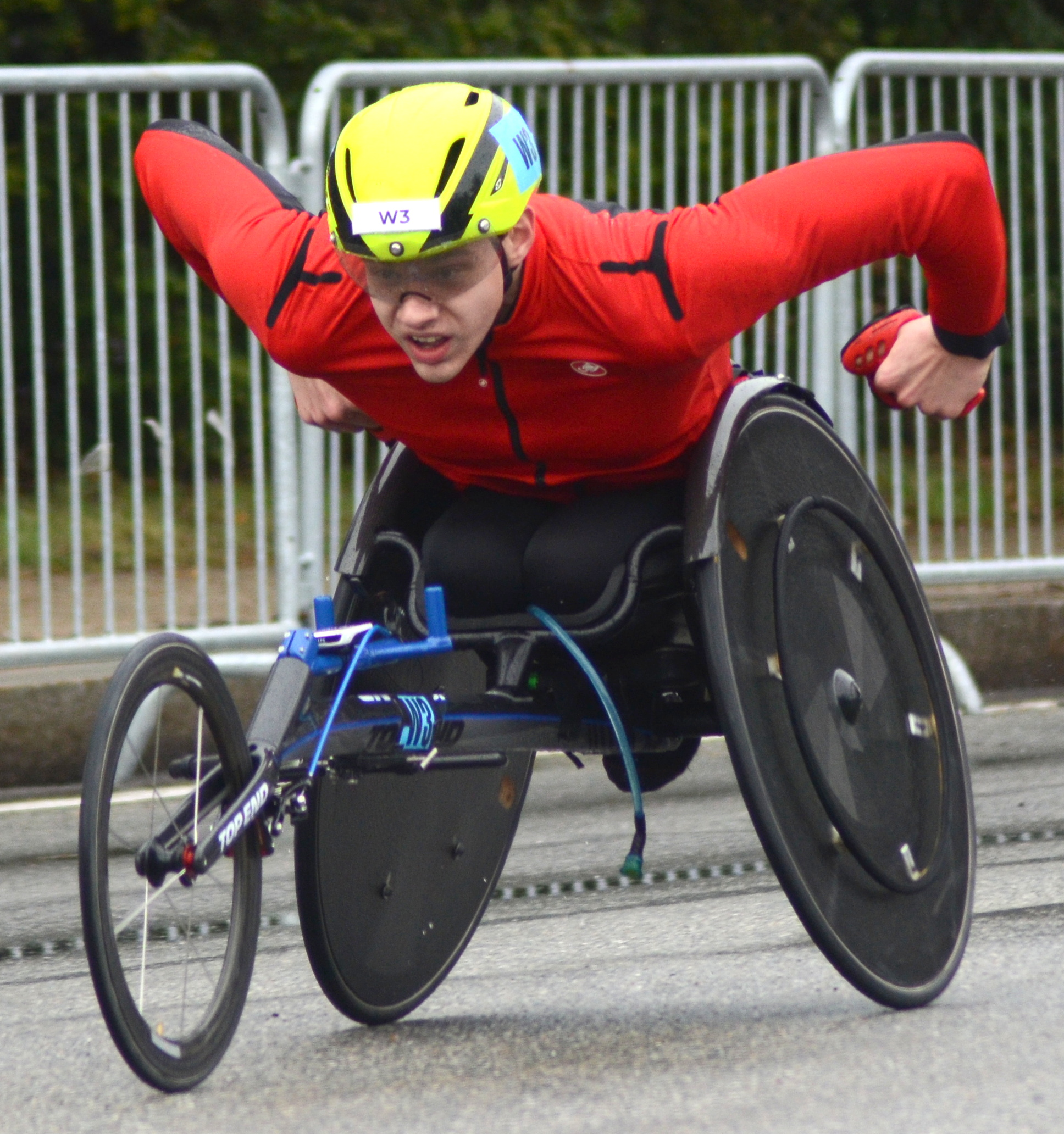
Daniel Romanchuk, winner of the men's wheelchair race.

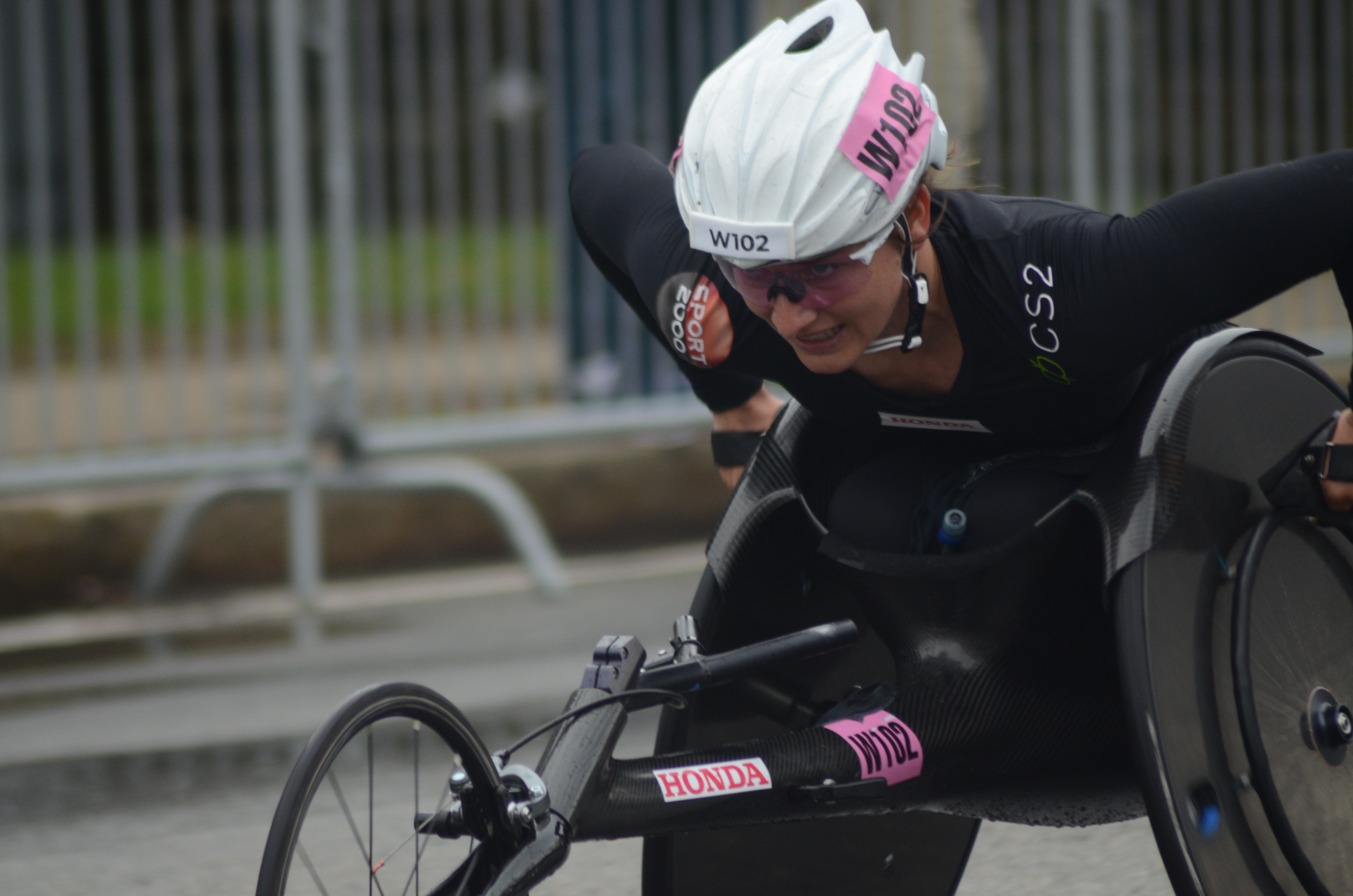
Manuela Schär, winner of the women's wheelchair race.

In the wheelchair race, Weir fell out of the leading group following the Flying 400 sprint. 20-year-old American Daniel Romanchuk managed to pull away from the lead group in the last kilometre to win in a time of 1:33:38. Marcel Hug of Switzerland and Tomoki Suzuki of Japan finished second and third respectively, while Weir finished fifth. In the women's wheelchair race, Schär dropped the other competitors about 30 minutes into the race, and was able to win in a time of 1:44:09. Rozario and McFadden finished over five minutes later in second and third, respectively.

The women's race contained four pacemakers, and three of them left the rest of the runners behind within the first five minutes of the race. The race had got off to a slow start and they went through 4.5 miles (7.2 km) at about 2:20:00 pace. They passed the 15 kilometres (9.3 mi) mark at about 2:21:00 pace, four minutes slower than the women's only world record set by Keitany at the 2017 edition. The pace slowed even further, passing halfway in 1:11:38. About 90 minutes into the race, Keitany began to drop from the lead group as Kenyan Brigid Kosgei and Cheruiyot began to move away from the rest. At 35 kilometres (22 mi), Kosgei had put a three-second gap between herself and Cheruiyot and just five minutes later had completely dropped her. She managed to hold the lead and finished in a time of 2:18:20, with a second-half split time of 1:06:42, the fastest in women's marathon history. Cheruiyot finished second in 2:20:14, 2018 Dubai Marathon winner Roza Dereje finished third in 2:20:51, whilst Keitany finished fifth.

British tennis player Andy Murray started the men's race. A group of nine formed and they ran at a controlled pace, passing 10 kilometres (6.2 mi) in 29:01 and halfway in 1:01:37. Once the pacemakers had dropped out, Kipchoge took lead of the group which included Shura, Mule Wasihun, Mosinet Geremew, Farah, Wilson Kipsang Kiprotich, and Tamirat Tola. Kipchoge began to increase the pace, leaving only himself, Mosinet, Mule, and Shura in the lead group by the 30 kilometres (19 mi) point. From mile 20 to 24, they ran a pace of about 4:40 per mile, enough to drop Shura and Mule. However, Kipchoge soon left Mosinet behind after nearly two hours of racing and waved to the crowd as he crossed the finish line in 2:02:37. Mosinet finished second in 2:02:55, Mule finished third in 2:03:16, Shura finished fourth in 2:05:01, and Farah finished fifth in 2:05:39. Kipchoge broke the previous London Marathon record by 28 seconds which he had set in 2016, and also ran the second quickest marathon in history behind his 2018 Berlin Marathon performance.

=== Non-elite race ===
About 42,000 runners took part in the non-elite race and the total raised for charities surpassed £1 billion since the race began in 1981. The organisers of the race decided to reduce the number of plastic bottles being used during the race by using biodegradable, edible water pods made of seaweed extract known as Ooho. They were invented by London-based Skipping Rocks Lab. They also reduced the number of water stations from 26 to 19 and reduced the number of plastic bottles on the course by 215,000.

== Results ==
=== Elite men ===
Position	Athlete	Nationality	Time
1st place, gold medalist(s)	Eliud Kipchoge	Kenya	2:02:37
2nd place, silver medalist(s)	Mosinet Geremew	Ethiopia	2:02:55
3rd place, bronze medalist(s)	Mule Wasihun	Ethiopia	2:03:16
4	Shura Kitata	Ethiopia	2:05:01
5	Mo Farah	United Kingdom	2:05:39
6	Tamirat Tola	Ethiopia	2:06:57
7	Bashir Abdi	Belgium	2:07:03
8	Leul Gebresilase	Ethiopia	2:07:15
9	Yassine Rachik	Italy	2:08:05
10	Callum Hawkins	United Kingdom	2:08:14

=== Elite women ===
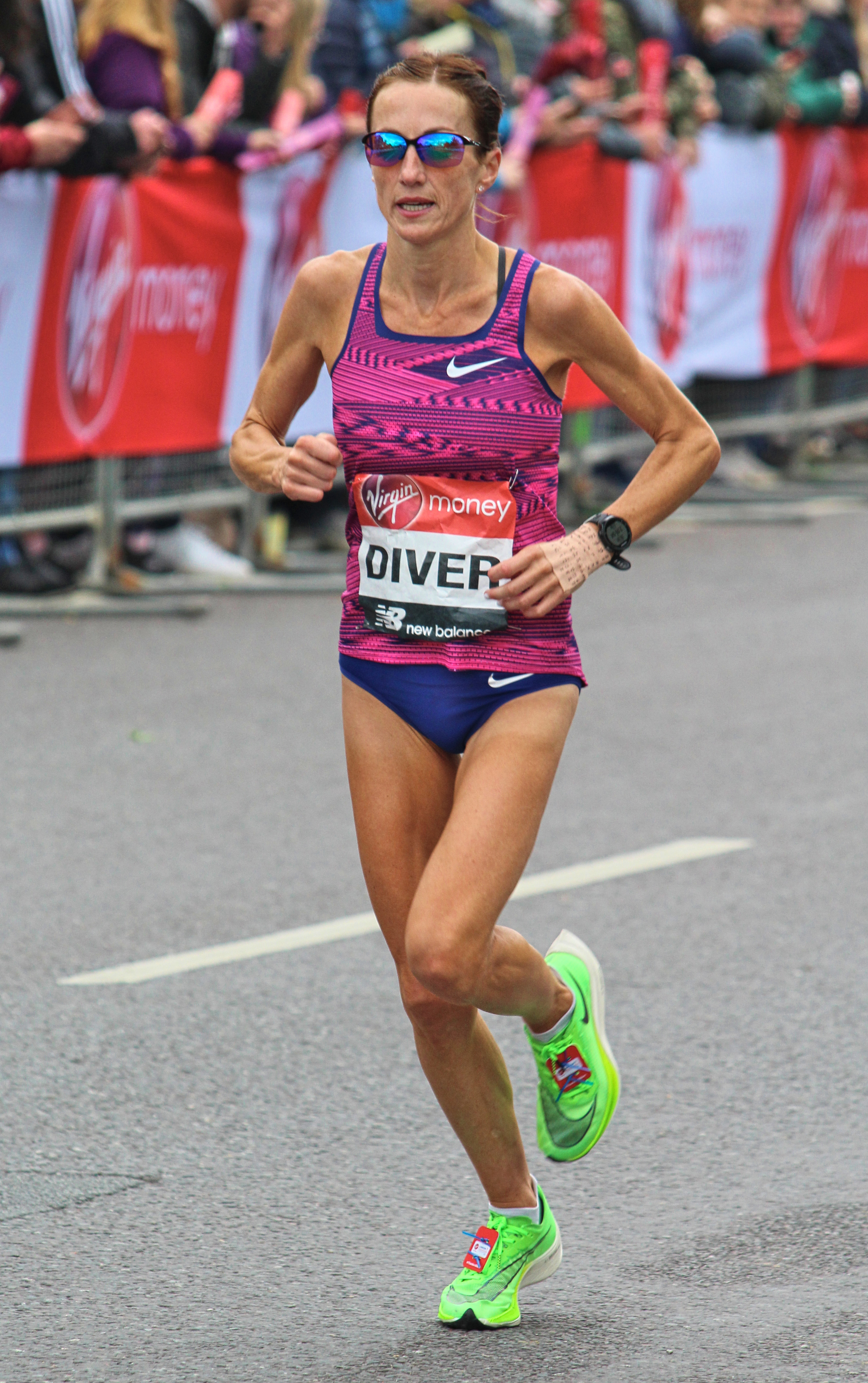
Sinead Diver running in the elite women's race

Position	Athlete	Nationality	Time
1st place, gold medalist(s)	Brigid Kosgei	Kenya	2:18:20
2nd place, silver medalist(s)	Vivian Cheruiyot	Kenya	2:20:14
3rd place, bronze medalist(s)	Roza Dereje	Ethiopia	2:20:51
4	Gladys Cherono Kiprono	Kenya	2:20:52
5	Mary Jepkosgei Keitany	Kenya	2:20:58
6	Emily Sisson	United States	2:23:08
7	Sinead Diver	Australia	2:24:11
8	Carla Salomé Rocha	Portugal	2:24:47
9	Birhane Dibaba	Ethiopia	2:25:04
10	Charlotte Purdue	United Kingdom	2:25:38

=== Wheelchair men ===
Position	Athlete	Nationality	Time
1st place, gold medalist(s)	Daniel Romanchuk	United States	1:33:38
2nd place, silver medalist(s)	Marcel Hug	Switzerland	1:33:42
3rd place, bronze medalist(s)	Tomoki Suzuki	Japan	1:33:51
4	Dai Yuqiang	China	1:37:30
5	David Weir	United Kingdom	1:37:32
6	Ernst van Dyk	South Africa	1:37:32
7	Jordi Madera	Spain	1:37:32
8	Hiroki Nishida	Japan	1:37:34
9	Aaron Pike	United States	1:37:34
10	Hiroyuki Yamamoto	Japan	1:37:34

=== Wheelchair women ===
Position	Athlete	Nationality	Time
1st place, gold medalist(s)	Manuela Schär	Switzerland	1:44:09
2nd place, silver medalist(s)	Tatyana McFadden	United States	1:49:42
3rd place, bronze medalist(s)	Madison de Rozario	Australia	1:49:44
4	Eliza Ault-Connell	Australia	1:50:02
5	Tsubasa Kina	Japan	1:51:22
6	Zou Lihong	China	1:52:10
7	Katrina Gerhard	United States	1:52:11
8	Nikita den Boer	Netherlands	1:52:12
9	Arielle Rausin	United States	1:52:12
10	Aline Rocha	Brazil	1:52:13
