= Tamirat Tola =

Ethiopian long-distance runner (born 1991)

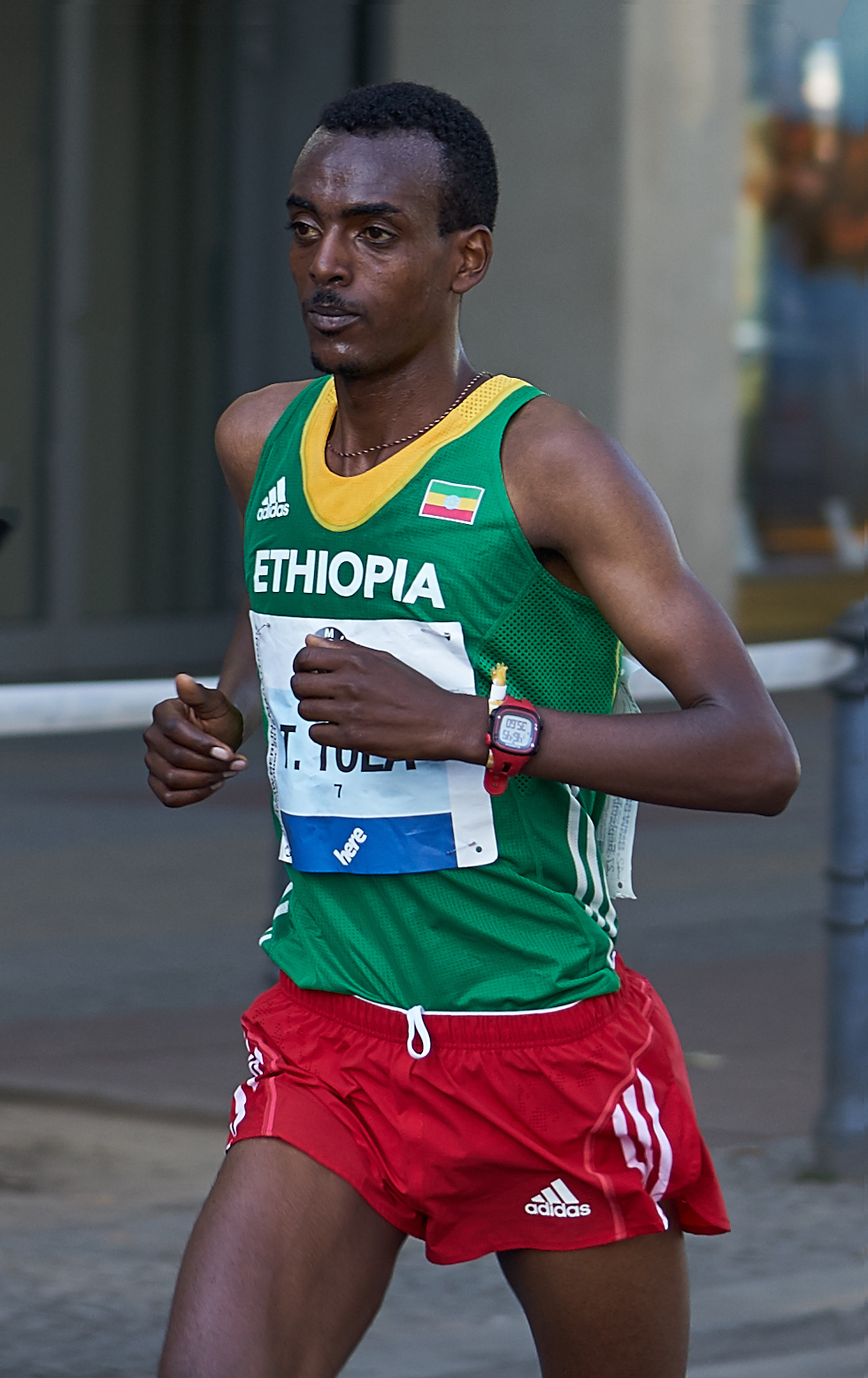
- Tamirat at the 2015 Berlin Marathon

Personal information
- Full name: Tamirat Tola Abera
- Nationality: Ethiopian
- Born: 11 August 1991 (age 35)

Sport
- Country: Ethiopia
- Sport: Athletics
- Event: Long-distance running
- Club: Oromia Police Club

Achievements and titles
- Personal bests: Marathon: 2:02:59 (London 2026); Olympic Marathon: 2:06:26 OR (Paris 2024); Half marathon: 59:37 (Prague 2017); 10,000 meters: 26:57.33 (Eugene 2016); Olympic 10,000 meters: 27:06.26 (Rio 2016); 10K: 28:12 (Bolzano 2018)
Medal record
Men's athletics
Representing Ethiopia
Olympic Games
Gold medal – first place	2024 Paris	Marathon
Bronze medal – third place	2016 Rio de Janeiro	10,000 m
World Championships
Gold medal – first place	2022 Eugene	Marathon
Silver medal – second place	2017 London	Marathon
World Half Marathon Championships
Silver medal – second place	2016 Cardiff	Team
World Cross Country Championships
Gold medal – first place	2015 Guiyang	Team
World Marathon Majors
Gold medal – first place	2023 New York	Marathon
Bronze medal – third place	2022 Tokyo	Marathon
Bronze medal – third place	2023 London	Marathon

Tamirat Tola Abera (born 11 August 1991) is an Ethiopian Olympic and world champion long-distance runner. Hailing from the regional state of Oromia, he competes in track, road and cross country events. He won gold medal in the marathon at the 2024 Summer Olympics, setting an Olympic record, and the bronze medal in the 10,000 metres at the 2016 Summer Olympics. He competed in the marathon at the 2017 and 2022 World Athletics Championships, earning silver and gold, respectively, and setting a championship record at the 2022 competition. He finished third at both the 2021 Tokyo and 2023 London marathons and won the 2023 New York City Marathon, breaking the course record.

== Career ==
=== 2013–2014 ===
At 22, Tamirat Tola won the May 2013 4th edition of the Lake Hawassa Half Marathon, setting a course record of 62:44. This race is part of The Great Ethiopian Run organization and is distinct from the inaugural Haile Gebrselassie Half Marathon won by Gudisa Shentema that also took place in 2013 in Hawassa. In June, in the Czech Republic, Tamirat won the České Budějovice Half Marathon with a time of 62:24. The same month in Langueux, France, at the Corrida Internationale de Langueux, he took third place in the 10K road-race with a time of 28:24, three seconds behind the Ethiopian winner, Tesfaye Abera and one second behind Kenya's Milton Rotich.

In September 2013, again in the Czech Republic, he took fourth place at the Ústí nad Labem Half Marathon, further improving his pace for that distance to 61:27. Then in October, with a time of 60:14, he finished third in the 35th Marseille-Cassis 20-km race behind countryman Mule Wasihun and Cyprian Kotut of Kenya.

In January 2014, his marathon debut was at the high-profile Dubai Marathon which he finished in fourth place with a time of 2:06:17. But in April at the Paris Marathon, after having kept up with the leaders until about kilometer 27, he fell back, finishing at 3:04:24.

=== 2015 ===
In February 2015 in Addis Ababa, the relative newcomer won the 32nd Jan Meda International Cross Country event, a 12-km race which he finished in 35:08 in a photo-finish with Bonsa Dida. This led to his selection for the 2015 IAAF World Cross Country Championships in March of that year. Making his international debut, he took sixth place in the senior race which helped the Ethiopians narrowly take the team title on equal points with Kenya. Muktar Edris, Hagos Gebrhiwet and Atsedu Tsegay were the other point-scoring team members.

In April 2015, Tamirat finished third behind Victor Chumo and countryman Muktar Edris in the 31st Giro Media Blenio in Dongio, Switzerland with a 10K time of 28:26.6. Then two weeks later Tamirat finished fifth in the Yangzhou Jianzhen International Half Marathon in China, securing a new best at 60:08. In June, he finished sixth with a time of 27:22.64 in the Ethiopian World Championships 10,000-meter time trial in Hengelo, Netherlands.

In September, by his own account, he dropped out of the 2015 Berlin Marathon. But in November he secured two major titles, winning the 15th Great Ethiopian Run in Addis Ababa and a week later the 34th Cross Internacional de la Constitucion in Alcobendas, Spain. He completied the Addis Ababa 10K course with a time of 28:44, again with Bonsa Dida claiming second, this time six seconds behind. He completed that 9.24-km Spanish race with a time of 29:28, beating out Timothy Toroitich and turning the tables on Muktar Edris.

In December 2015, Tamirat took second place, one second behind Bahrain's Aweke Ayalew in the Cross Internacional de Venta de Banos, finishing the 10.5-km course with a time of 32:19. Tamirat closed out 2015 winning the men's 10K of the 41st BOclassic on New Year's Eve in Bolzano, Italy with a time of 28:28 atop an all-Ethiopian podium.

=== 2016–2017 ===
These good performances on the circuit led to Tamirat's win at the 34th Cross Internacional de Itálica near Seville in January 2016. In the penultimate 2-km lap, he surged ahead putting 50 meters between himself and the leaders. Finishing the more than 10.9-km course in 30:57, he bested Teklemariam Medhin and again Toroitich and called the win "the most important so far."

He was part of the national team setup in 2016, this time for the 2016 IAAF World Half Marathon Championships, a March event in Cardiff. He was again an essential team member with his fifth-place finish, a personal best of 60:06, pushing Ethiopia through Abayneh Ayele, Tamirat, and Mule Wasihun to the team silver medals behind Kenya.

In May 2016, with a personal best of 26:57.33, Tamirat took 3rd place in the Eugene Prefontaine Classic 10,000 meter race behind Mo Farah and William Malel Sitonik.

In August 2016, with a time of 27:06.26, Tamirat won bronze in Rio in the 2016 Summer Olympics 10,000-metre race. He finished 1.09 seconds behind British gold medalist Mo Farah with Paul Tanui of Kenya taking the podium for silver.

Then in October 2016 at the Giro al Sas 10K Road Race in Trento, Italy, Tamirat took second behind Abdallah Mande of Uganda, though both racers were clocked at 28:47. Tamirat's lap-7 surge was met by Mande, both of them leaving Muktar Edris for third. Eight days later, it was Tamirat who left Mande behind at third, winning the Dutch race 4 Miles of Groningen with a time of 17:38. Countryman Yigrem Demelash finished second.

Tamirat won the January 2017 Dubai Marathon clocking 2:04:11 and breaking the 2012 course record held by Ayele Abshero, also from Ethiopia. Ethiopians Mule Wasihun and Sisay Lemma took second and third respectively. The effort earned Tamirat a prize of $200,000.

Spectators at the Sportsimo Prague Half Marathon in April 2017 witnessed Tamirat achieve a personal best of 59:37, winning the race over a minute faster than Josphat Kimutai Tanui and Geoffrey Yegon of Kenya and running the race's third 5K segment in only 13:54.

In August 2017, Tamirat participated in the World Championships held in London, earning the silver medal in the marathon with a time of 2:09:49 behind Kenyan winner Geoffrey Kirui and two seconds ahead of Tanzania's Alphonce Simbu.

=== 2018–2019 ===
Tamirat's third appearance at the Dubai Marathon in January 2018 earned him third place with a time of 2:04:06, the same as Asefa Mengstu of Ethiopia who took fourth. In fact, the top-ten men's finishers were all Ethiopians, led by Mosinet Geremew and Leul Gebresilase. Tamirat's effort was hindered by his having been blocked at a drink station where he almost fell at kilometer 35.

Runners in the 2018 Boston Marathon in April experienced cold, wet conditions including 25 mph headwinds, freezing rain and temperatures in the 30s Fahrenheit. As a result, 23 elite runners dropped out including Tamirat. Yuki Kawauchi of Japan won the race.

November 2018 was Tamirat's first attempt at the New York City Marathon where he took fourth place at 2:08:30, about two-and-a-half minutes behind the race's winner Lelisa Dessisa, also from Ethiopia.

Tamirat returned to Bolzano for the 2018 New Year's Eve Boclassic 10K and won it with a time of 28:12, the race's fastest win since 1998. Competitors Jairus Birech of Kenya and Oscar Chelimo of Uganda took second and third respectively.

In April 2019 at the London Marathon, though he finished with a time of 2:06:57, Tamirat was one of many elites unable to keep up with the "searing" pace of winner Eliud Kipchoge. Tamirat finished sixth.

Tamirat won the July 2019 20th Bogatá Half Marathon with a time of 62:35 ahead of Lawrence Cherono and John Lotiang, both from Kenya. After 7 km, Tamirat took the lead and never gave it up, finishing fifteen seconds above the record and declaring his desire to return to break it.

=== 2020–2021 ===
The COVID-19 pandemic caused organizers of the 2020 London Marathon to postpone it to October from its usual date in April and to allow only a small number of elite runners onto its official course, a series of 1.3-mile laps plus an additional 1,470 yards. Tamirat was included in that elite group and finished sixth with a time of 2:06:41, one minute behind the winner, Ethiopia's Shura Kitata.

The pandemic also caused the 2020 Summer Olympics to be postponed until 2021, and therefore the Ethiopian Olympic Trials in Hengelo until June 2021, where Tamirat participated in the 10,000-meter trials. He finished eleventh with a time of 27:54.95.

Though Tamirat did not make the Ethiopian Olympic team for Tokyo, he smashed not only the course record, but also the record for fastest marathon on Dutch soil at the TCS Amsterdam Marathon in October 2021. He finished with a time of 2:03:39, 30 seconds ahead of Kenya's Bernard Koech. Leul Gebresilase finished a close third.

On New Year's Eve 2021, he returned for the third time to the BOclassic 10,000-meter road race in Bolzano, Italy, finishing in second place behind countryman Tadese Worku and ahead of Great Britain's Tom Mortimer in third place.

=== 2022–2023 ===
The 2021 Tokyo Marathon was originally scheduled for October 2021, but due to concerns surrounding increased infections of the COVID-19 Delta variant, the race was postponed until March 2022. Tamirat took third on the fast, flat course with a time of 2:04:14, bested by two Kenyans. The favorite, Kenya's Eliud Kipchoge, finished first while Amos Kipruto took second place.

In July 2022, Tamirat won gold in the marathon at the World Championships in Eugene, Oregon, an early race under the leadership of Gemedo Dedefo, Tamirat's coach. Until his surge at around the 20-mile mark, there were no clear leaders among the group of 60-or-so elites, which included defending world champion Lelisa Desisa. Start temperatures were in the mid-50s Fahrenheit on a cloudy day. That, coupled with a relatively flat course, created a fast race. Tamirat stretched his lead to over a minute from his closest pursuers and finished with a championship-record time of 2:05:36. Mosinet Geremew took second with Belgium's Bashir Abdi finishing a close third.

Tamirat reported muscle fatigue after the World Championships preventing him from training. This compelled him to withdraw from the 2022 London Marathon before the race which had been postponed to October from its regular April date due to COVID-19. Instead, on the day of the London Marathon, Tamirat was in Italy. There, he won and set a course record of 59:49 at the Trento Half Marathon, followed by Kenya's Wesley Kimutai and then Kevin Kibet of Uganda at third.

But in April 2023, at the next London Marathon, Tamirat took third place with a time of 2:04:59, though more than three minutes behind winner Kelvin Kiptum of Kenya. Then in August at the marathon World Championships in Budapest, though Tamirat was in the leader group at least until the 30-kilometer mark, he dropped out of the race for what he said later was a stomach bug.

In November 2023, Tamirat won the New York City Marathon with a course-record time of 2:04:58, beating Geoffrey Mutai's 11-year-old record by eight seconds. Once again, second place went to another Ethiopian, Jemal Yiner, while Kenya's Albert Korir took third. Tamirat led the elite pack for the entire race.

=== 2024–2025 ===
In April 2024, Tamirat started the London Marathon but failed to finish, which led to his omission from Ethiopia's national team for the 2024 Olympics. Instead, Kenenisa Bekele, who finished second at London, earned a spot on the team alongside Sisay Lemma and Deresa Geleta. But an injury forced Sisay to withdraw from the team, opening the door for Tamirat to race in the Olympic marathon with his compatriots.

Then, on a bright and clear August morning at the 2024 Summer Olympics in Paris, Tamirat joined the group of 80 who raced west from the city center to Versailles and back. In the warmer conditions which in recent years he had begun to excel, he won the marathon title with an Olympic Record time of 2:06:26. He first moved to the lead group just before the halfway point. At around mile 17, in response to runner Akira Akasaki's aggressive attempt to break away from the leaders, Tamirat made a key move that secured his position. He remained in the lead until the 20th mile after which he surged ahead, eventually putting 21 seconds between himself and his pursuers. A race that was called "brutal," "gritty," and that "was billed as one of the most difficult in Olympic history," it challenged racers with steep climbs including a 13.5% incline at mile 18. Belgium's Bashir Abdi and Kenya's Benson Kipruto would join Tamirat on the podium with silver and bronze respectively. Tamirat shared the honor with his injured countryman Sisay who had withdrawn from the team, saying, "this victory also belongs to him for giving me this opportunity." Tamirat was the first male Ethiopian to win the title since 2000 when Gezahegne Abera took the gold at the games in Sydney.

At an Addis Ababa awards ceremony in August 2024 at the National Palace, to honor Tamirat's Olympic win, Ethiopia's President Sahle-Work Zewde awarded him seven million birr (US$65,800) and a gold medal. At the same ceremony, Tamirat's coach Gemedo Dedefa refused the president's two-million-burr (US$18,800) award, claiming it was insufficient considering the coach's high level of Olympic success in 2025.

Tamirat trains with the Oromia Police Club, and in response to his Olympic win, the Oromia Police Commission promoted him within its ranks and honored him with a parade.

In November 2024, Tamirat returned to the New York City Marathon placing fourth with a time of 2:08:12, more than a minute behind title winner Evans Chebet of Kenya.

In December 2024 in Monoco, World Athletics honored Tamirat with the Out of Stadium Athlete of the Year award.

In March 2025 in Addis Ababa, Tamirat won the 19th Ethiopia Police Sports Festival half-marathon with a time of 1:04:02. Soon after, in April, he finished the London Marathon in fifth place with a time of 2:04:42. His time placed him over two minutes behind Sabastian Sawe from Kenya who took first.

== Achievements ==
=== International competitions ===
Year	Competition	Venue	Position	Event	Result
Representing Ethiopia
2015	World Cross Country Championships	Guiyang, China	6th	Senior race	35:33
2015	World Cross Country Championships	Guiyang, China	1st	Team	20 pts
2016	World Half Marathon Championships	Cardiff, United Kingdom	5th	Half marathon	1:00:06
2016	World Half Marathon Championships	Cardiff, United Kingdom	2nd	Team	3:01:16
2016	Olympic Games	Rio de Janeiro, Brazil	3rd	10,000 m	27:06.26
2017	World Championships	London, United Kingdom	2nd	Marathon	2:09:49
2022	World Championships	Eugene, OR, United States	1st	Marathon	2:05:36 CR
2023	World Championships	Budapest, Hungary	–	Marathon	DNF
2024	Olympic Games	Paris, France	1st	Marathon	2:06:26
World Marathon Majors
2015	Berlin Marathon	Berlin, Germany	–	Marathon	DNF
2018	Boston Marathon	Boston, MA, United States	–	Marathon	DNF
2018	New York City Marathon	New York, NY, United States	4th	Marathon	2:08:30
2019	London Marathon	London, United Kingdom	6th	Marathon	2:06:57
2019	New York City Marathon	New York, NY, United States	4th	Marathon	2:09:20
2020	London Marathon	London, United Kingdom	6th	Marathon	2:06:41
2022	Tokyo Marathon	Tokyo, Japan	3rd	Marathon	2:04:14
2023	London Marathon	London, United Kingdom	3rd	Marathon	2:04:59
2023	New York City Marathon	New York, NY, United States	1st	Marathon	2:04:58
2024	London Marathon	London, United Kingdom	–	Marathon	DNF
2024	New York City Marathon	New York, NY, United States	4th	Marathon	2:08:12
2025	London Marathon	London, United Kingdom	5th	Marathon	2:04:42
2026	London Marathon	London, United Kingdom	5th	Marathon	2:02:59

=== Circuit wins ===
- 2013: Lake Hawassa Half Marathon (ETH), České Budějovice Half Marathon
- 2015: Great Ethiopian Run, Cross Internacional de la Constitucion, BOclassic
- 2016: Cross Internacional de Itálica, 4 Miles of Groningen (NED)
- 2017: Dubai Marathon, Prague Half Marathon PB
- 2018: BOclassic PB
- 2019: Bogotá Half Marathon CR
- 2021: Amsterdam Marathon NR, CR, PB
- 2022: Trento Half Marathon CR (ITA)
- 2025: Ethiopian National Police Sports Festival half marathon

== Personal life ==
Tamirat is married to Dera Dida. They have a son, Fenan, who was 3 years old as reported in October 2024. Dera Dida is also an elite runner among whose titles include the 2023 Dubai Marathon which she won alongside her husband's brother Abdisa Tola.
