= Madrid Half Marathon =

- Date: April
- Location: Madrid, Spain
- Event type: Road
- Distance: Half marathon, 5K run
- Primary sponsor: Movistar
- Established: 2001 (25 years ago)
- Course records: Men's: 59:38 (2021) (Kenya) Ronald Kirui; Women's: 1:07:22 (2022) (Kenya) Winfridah Moseti
- Website: Madrid Half Marathon
- Participants: 10,050 finishers (2022); 10,665 finishers (2021); 15,496 (2019)

Madrid Half Marathon is an annual half marathon arranged in Madrid, Spain. Organised by the Marathon Sports Association, it is held at the beginning of April and in 2012 it attracted more than 13,000 runners.

The 2020 edition of the race was postponed to 2020.10.04 due to the coronavirus pandemic, with all registered runners given the option to defer the registration to either 2021 or 2022 at no extra cost.

== List of winners ==
Edition	Year	Men's winner	Time (m:s)	Women's winner	Time (m:s)
1st	2001	Abel Chimukoko (ZIM)	1:03:32	Jane Salumäe (EST)	1:13:20
2nd	2002	Samuel Kimaiyo (KEN)	1:03:25	María Ruiz Castellanos (ESP)	1:17:49
3rd	2003	Cuthbert Nyasango (ZIM)	1:02:40	Tina María Ramos (ESP)	1:15:09
4th	2004	Abdelhadi El Mouaziz (MAR)	1:02:42	Leah Kiprono (KEN)	1:14:52
5th	2005	Edwin Koech (KEN)	1:03:15	Muliye Lemma (ETH)	1:14:38
6th	2006	Shadrack Kiplagat (KEN)	1:02:31	Anne Kosgei (KEN)	1:13:23
7th	2007	Francis Wachira (KEN)	1:04:13	Ana Burgos (ESP)	1:15:24
8th	2008	Erick Kibet (KEN)	1:04:33	Mercy Cheburet (KEN)	1:15:28
9th	2009	Kabtamu Reta (ETH)	1:03:35	Asselefech Assefa (ETH)	1:13:46
10th	2010	Allan Ndiwa (KEN)	1:04:15	Soud Kanbouchia (MAR)	1:12:55
11th	2011	Enock Mitei (KEN)	1:02:42	Frehiwat Goshu (ETH)	1:13:25
12th	2012	Eliud Kiili (KEN)	1:02:07	Jane Muia (KEN)	1:13:16
13th	2013	Haile Tegegn (ETH)	1:02:57	Meseret Kitata (ETH)	1:11:31
14th	2014	Peter Emase (KEN)	1:02:00	Cinthya Jerotich (KEN)	1:09:40
15th	2015	Alex Kapcheromit (UGA)	1:02:30	Linah Cheruto (KEN)	1:10:43
16th	2016	Morris Gachaga (KEN)	1:02:40	Polline Wanjiku (KEN)	1:12:39
17th	2017	Moses Kibet (UGA)	1:01:54	Joy Loyce (KEN)	1:10:27
18th	2018	Ezrah Sang (KEN)	1:02:37	Naomi Jebet (KEN)	1:09:56
19th	2019	Kipkemoi Kiprono (KEN)	1:01:47	Tigist Teshome (ETH)	1:10:08
20th	2021	Ronald Kirui (KEN)	59:38	Nelly Jepchumba (KEN)	1:07:46
21st	2022	Vincent Kipkemoi (KEN)	1:01:05	Winfridah Moseti (KEN)	1:07:22
22nd	2023	Hillary Kipkoech (KEN)	59:56	Zewditu Aderaw (ETH)	1:07:38
23rd	2024	Mike Chematot (KEN)	1:01:07	Aberash Shilima (ETH)	1:08:31

=== Wins by country ===
Country	Men's	Women's	Total
Kenya	16	11	27
Ethiopia	2	4	6
Spain	0	3	3
Morocco	1	1	2
Uganda	2	0	2
Zimbabwe	2	0	2
Estonia	0	1	1
