= Kamagut =

Kamagut is a Sub-Location in Turbo Division of the Uasin Gishu County. It is 15 km from the town of Eldoret.

William Ruto, the current President of Kenya, was born in Kamagut in 1966.
