= Yenew Alamirew =

Ethiopian runner

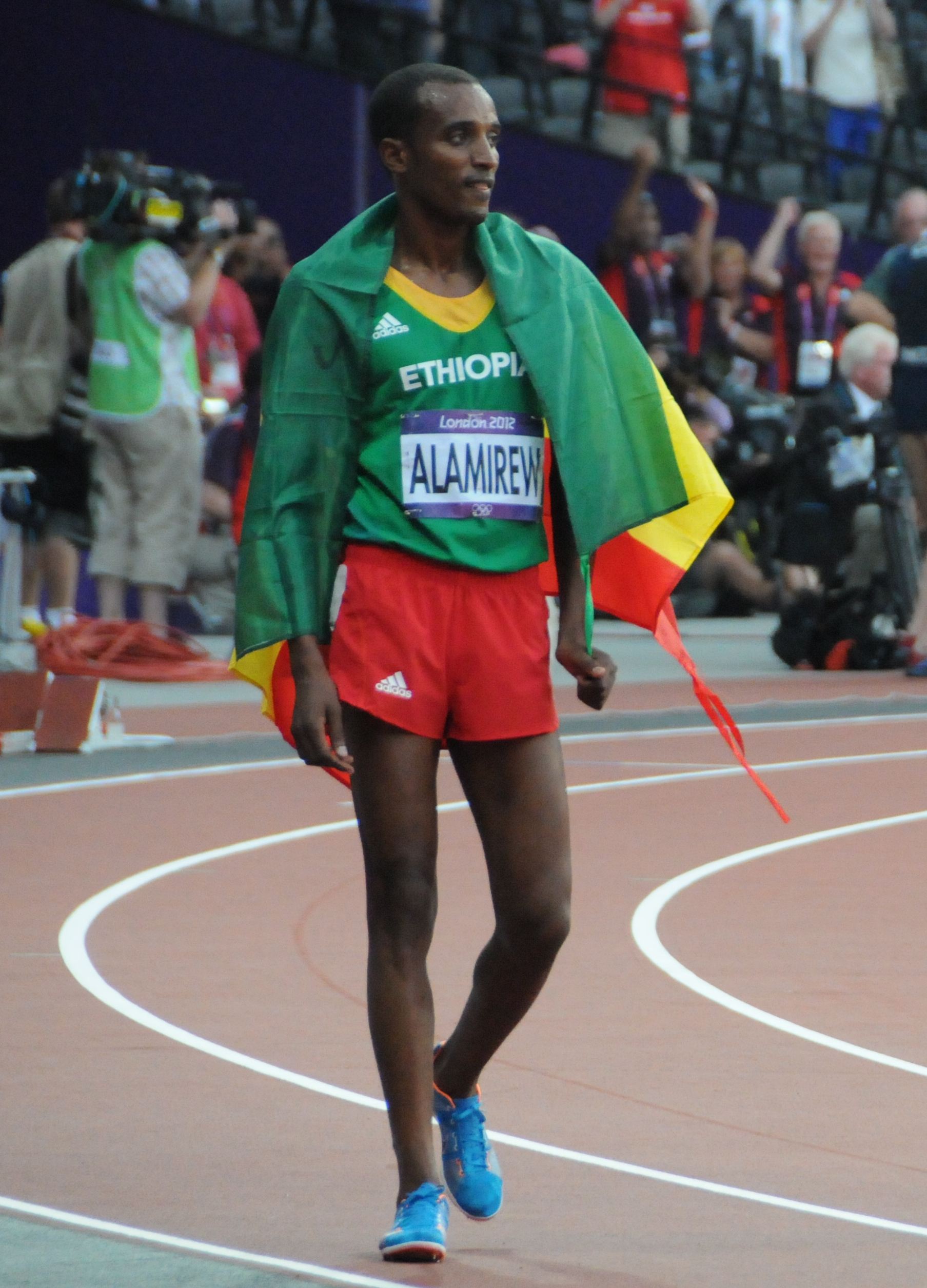
- Alamirew at the 2012 Olympics

Personal information
- Full name: Yenew Alamirew Getahun
- Born: 27 May 1990 (age 36) Tilili, Amhara, Ethiopia
Medal record
Men's athletics
Representing Ethiopia
Diamond League
Winner	2013	5000 m

Yenew Alamirew Getahun (born 27 May 1990) is an Ethiopian middle and long-distance runner. He represented his country at the 2012 Summer Olympics as well as two indoor and one outdoor World Championships.

Yenew was the 2013 Diamond League winner for the 5000 metres. His two younger brothers Yibel and Engida are also runners.

== Achievements ==
Year	Competition	Venue	Position	Event	Notes
Representing Ethiopia
2011	All-Africa Games	Maputo, Mozambique	2nd	5000 m	13:43.33
2012	World Indoor Championships	Istanbul, Turkey	9th	3000 m	7:45.15
2012	Olympic Games	London, United Kingdom	12th	5000 m	13:49.68
2013	World Championships	Moscow, Russia	9th	5000 m	13:31.27
2014	African Championships	Marrakesh, Morocco	5th	5000 m	13:45.86
2016	World Indoor Championships	Portland, United States	12th	3000 m	8:12.54
