= Lilac Bloomsday Run =

Annual road race in Spokane, United States

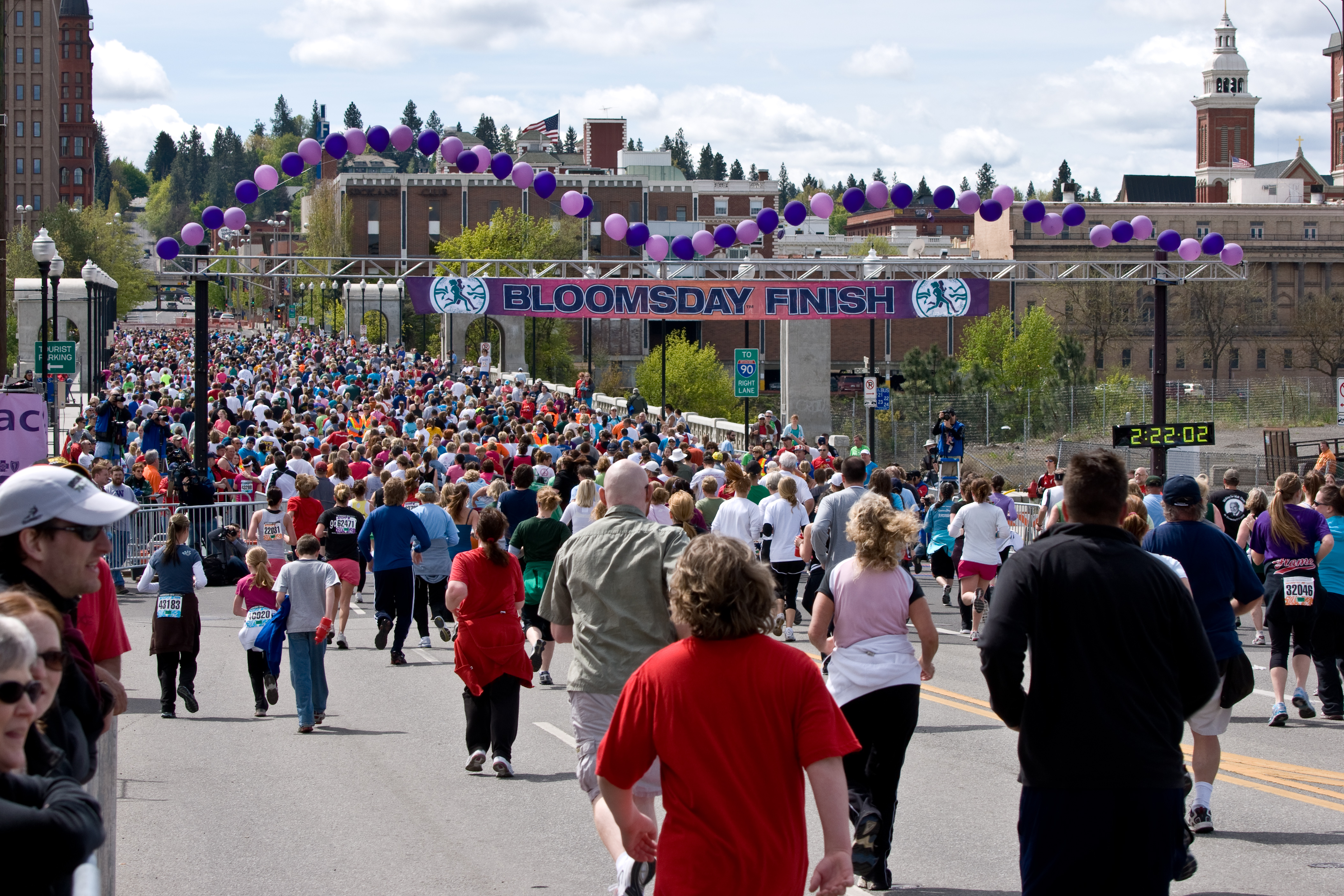
- 2010 finish line at Monroe Street Bridge
- Date: First Sunday in May
- Location: Spokane, Washington, U.S.
- Event type: Road
- Distance: 7.456 miles (12 km)
- Established: 1977, 49 years ago
- Course records: Men: 33:51 (2008); Micah Kogo; Women: 38:03 (2016); Cynthia Limo
- Website: bloomsdayrun.org

Location in the United States

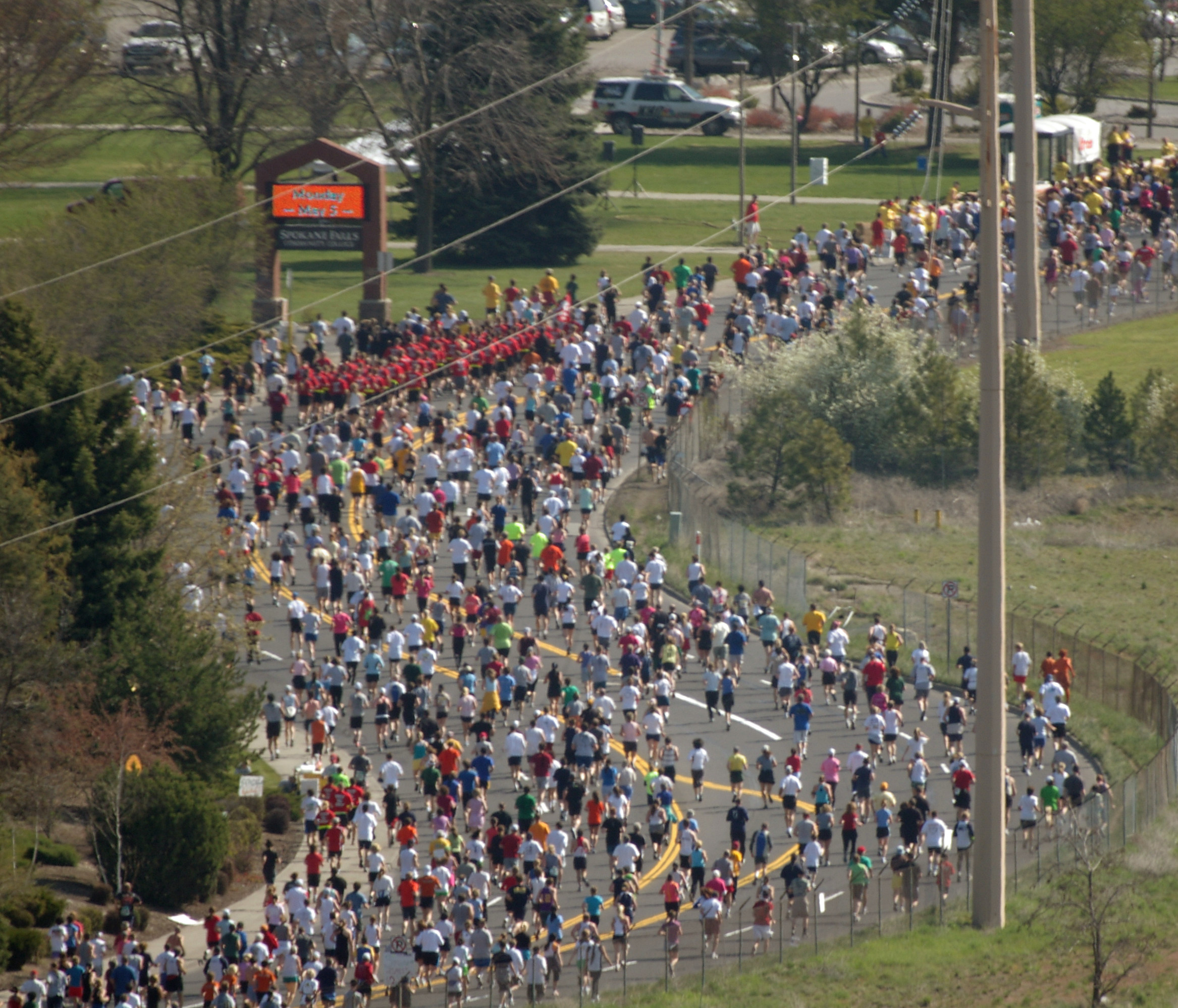
Descending Fort George Wright Drive in 2008

The Lilac Bloomsday Run, also known as Bloomsday, is an annual timed road race in the northwest United States, held on the first Sunday of May since 1977 in Spokane, Washington. The course length is 12 km (7.456 mi).

The run had over 38,000 participants every year since 1986 until 2020 during the COVID-19 pandemic. Registration peaked in 1996 at 61,298 with 56,156 finishers. Lineth Chepkurui set an unofficial 12 km world record in the 2010 women's race. (Note: The International Association of Athletics Federations, the international governing body for the sport of athletics/track and field, does not recognize world records or world bests in either an indoor or outdoor 12 km. The Association of Road Racing Statisticians does recognize a world record in the outdoor 12 km, however, their record keeping rules state: "A record quality course is defined as having not more than 1 m/km net drop between the start and finish and not more than 30 percent of the race distance separation between that start and finish, e.g. not more than a 3 km separation for a 10 km race [or 3.6 km for a 12 km race]. Records will only be accepted for record quality courses." Per ARRS standards, the course for the Lilac Bloomsday Run fulfills these conditions. Although Chepkurui ran a 38:07 two weeks later on May 16, 2010 at the Bay to Breakers (presumably the fastest 12 km ever for a woman), the course is not considered a "record quality course" in that the start and finish are separated by approximately 10.5 linear kilometers.)

The course record of 33:51 was set 18 years ago in 2008 by Micah Kogo, a pace of 4:32.4 per mile and an average speed of 13.217 mph (21.3 km/h). Veronica Loleo, of Kenya, broke the Women's course record by one hundredth of a second in 2025. Loleo navigated the 49th annual edition in 38:00.02. The previous best, 38:00.03, was set in 2016 by Cynthia Limo.

Don Kardong, who founded the race, explained the name as "a starting event for the Lilac Festival … you know, lilacs blooming. And of course, I like it because it rhymes with doomsday." The shortened name Bloomsday is usually associated instead with James Joyce's 1922 novel Ulysses and celebrations of June 16, the day in the life of Leopold Bloom that the novel chronicles.

Kardong had hoped for five hundred participants for the inaugural edition in 1977, and got nearly triple that. The second edition had over five thousand, and the third in 1979 was over ten thousand, with fifty thousand spectators lining the streets. The sixth edition in 1982 had over 22,000, and despite rain and some snow, there were over 30,000 in 1984.

The early editions were around eight miles (12.9 km) in length. A new course was introduced in 1980.

== Course ==
The course starts in Downtown Spokane and heads northwest along the far west end of town, passes by Mukogowa Ft. Wright Institute and Spokane Falls Community College before heading up "Doomsday Hill" and back downtown past the Spokane County Courthouse and ending at the Monroe Street Bridge. Every finisher of the race receives a Bloomsday T-shirt.

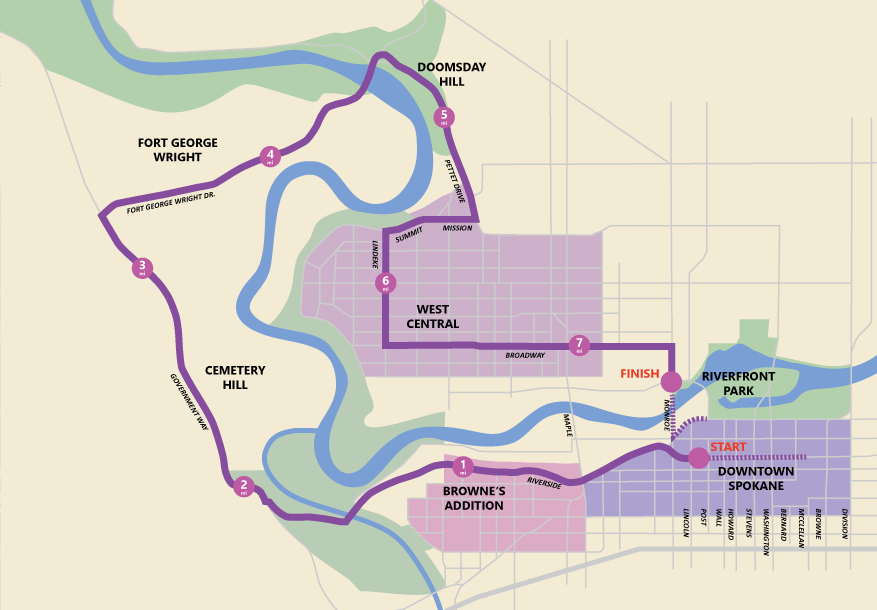
Course map of the Lilac Bloomsday Run

== Results ==
Year	Date(s)	Registrants	Finishers	Men's winner	Country	Time	Women's winner	Country	Time
2025	May 4	32,926	30,029	Patrick Kiprop	Kenya	34:08	Veronica Loleo	Kenya	38:00.02
2024	May 5	32,000+	27,889	Tebello Ramakongoana	Lesotho	34:40	Sarah Naibei	Kenya	39:00
2023	May 7	30,000+	25,882	Jemal Yimer (2)	Ethiopia	33:58	Yeshi Kalayu	Ethiopia	38:49
2022	May 1	24,096	21,088	Charles Wanjiku	Kenya	35:08	Biruktayit Degefa	Ethiopia	38:47
2022	April 28 - May 8	5,448	5,276	N/A	N/A	N/A	N/A	N/A	N/A
2021	April 30 - May 9	28,824	23,029	N/A	N/A	N/A	N/A	N/A	N/A
2020	September 18-20*	21,149	20,999	N/A	N/A	N/A	N/A	N/A	N/A
2019	May 5	38,559	35,244	Gabriel Geay	Tanzania	34:50	Rosemary Wanjiru	Kenya	39:06
2018	May 6	41,702	38,210	Jemal Yimer	Ethiopia	34:18	Buze Diriba (2)	Ethiopia	39:27
2017	May 7	42,986	39,371	Gabriel Geay	Tanzania	34:31	Buze Diriba	Ethiopia	40:19
2016	May 1	46,566	43,018	Philip Langat	Kenya	34:26	Cynthia Limo (2)	Kenya	38:03
2015	May 3	46,914	43,026	Lani Rutto	Kenya	34:22	Cynthia Limo	Kenya	39:27
2014	May 4	49,094	44,681	Allan Kiprono (2)	Kenya	34:11	Mary Wacera	Kenya	39:36
2013	May 5	51,613	47,298	Belete Assefa	Ethiopia	34:21	Buzunesh Deba	Ethiopia	39:53
2012	May 6	53,296	48,229	Allan Kiprono	Kenya	34:29	Mamitu Daska	Ethiopia	38:26
2011	May 1	56,652	51,303	Simon Ndirangu	Kenya	33:58	Misiker Mekonnen	Ethiopia	40:25
2010	May 2	55,090	50,721	Peter Kirui	Kenya	34:15	Lineth Chepkurui (3)	Kenya	38:10
2009	May 3	51,259	45,477	John Yuda	Tanzania	34:36	Lineth Chepkurui	Kenya	38:37
2008	May 4	47,528	43,640	Micah Kogo	Kenya	33:51	Lineth Chepkurui	Kenya	39:47
2007	May 6	44,180	40,362	John Korir (3)	Kenya	34:18	Edna Kiplagat	Kenya	38:52
2006	May 7	44,756	40,809	Gilbert Okari	Kenya	34:14	Isabella Ochichi	Kenya	38:38
2005	May 1	43,842	40,012	John Korir	Kenya	34:16	Asmae Leghzaoui	Morocco	39:33
2004	May 2	43,514	39,695	Simon Wangai	Kenya	34:59	Albina Ivanova	Russia	39:22
2003	May 4	44,641	40,027	John Korir	Kenya	34:16	Lyudmila Biktasheva	Russia	40:01
2002	May 5	51,282	45,775	James Koskei	Kenya	34:25	Colleen De Reuck	United States	38:53
2001	May 6	49,532	45,346	Dominic Kirui	Kenya	34:30	Elana Meyer	South Africa	39:24
2000	May 7	50,401	45,538	Reuben Cheruiyot	Kenya	34:10	Jane Omoro (3)	Kenya	40:08
1999	May 2	53,898	47,215	Joshua Chelanga	Kenya	34:18	Jane Omoro	Kenya	39:37
1998	May 3	53,389	48,453	Hezron Otwori	Kenya	34:23	Jane Omoro	Kenya	40:14
1997	May 4	55,270	49,467	Lazarus Nyakeraka (2)	Kenya	34:19	Kim Jones	United States; Washington	40:34
1996	May 5	61,298	56,156	Lazarus Nyakeraka	Kenya	34:07	Colleen De Reuck	South Africa	38:48
1995	May 7	59,100	54,154	Josphat Machuka (2)	Kenya	33:52	Delillah Asiago	Kenya	38:31
1994	May 1	60,037	55,195	Josphat Machuka	Kenya	34:10	Olga Appell	United States; New Mexico	38:57
1993	May 2	57,680	53,206	Arturo Barrios	Mexico	33:55	Anne Marie Letko	United States; New Jersey	39:19
1992	May 3	57,651	53,303	Yobes Ondieki	Kenya	33:55	Lisa Ondieki	Australia	39:02
1991	May 5	60,104	55,794	Steve Moneghetti	Australia	34:52	Lisa Weidenbach	United States; Washington	40:03
1990	May 6	54,869	51,122	Germán Silva	Mexico	34:42	Anne Audain (7)	New Zealand	39:40
1989	May 7	56,280	52,457	John Halvorsen	Norway	34:21	Lynn Williams	Canada; Saskatchewan	39:30
1988	May 1	57,298	53,155	Peter Koech	Kenya	34:22	Anne Audain	New Zealand	39:35
1987	May 3	54,261	50,946	Steve Binns	United Kingdom	34:38	Lesley Welch	United States; Massachusetts	39:22
1986	May 4	48,406	45,541	Jon Sinclair	United States; Colorado	34:25	Anne Audain	New Zealand	38:48
1985	May 5	39,662	37,736	Paul Davies-Hale	United Kingdom	34:27	Anne Audain	New Zealand	39:20
1984	May 6	33,312	30,463	Ibrahim Hussein	Kenya	34:33	Regina Joyce	Ireland	40:28
1983	May 1	28,173	25,932	Jon Sinclair	United States; Colorado	34:55	Anne Audain	New Zealand	39:29
1982	May 2	22,210	20,540	Henry Rono	Kenya	35:49	Anne Audain	New Zealand	40:02
1981	May 3	17,000	15,546	Duncan McDonald	United States; California	35:34	Anne Audain	New Zealand	41:54
1980	May 4	13,576	11,962	Mark Anderson	United States; Colorado	36:22	Gail Volk	United States; Washington	46:27
1979	May 6	10,082	10,070	Ric Rojas	United States; Colorado	37:07	Cathy Twomey	United States; Oregon	43:56
1978	May 7	5,460	5,024	Bill Rodgers	United States; Massachusetts	37:07	Marty Cooksey	United States; California	43:24
1977	May 1	1,400	1,198	Frank Shorter	United States; Colorado	38:26	Joan Ullyot	United States; California	53:26

*Delay due to COVID-19 pandemic. First virtual race.

Key: Course record Virtual race

- Early editions were around eight miles (12.9 km) in length.
