= Mary Wacera Ngugi =

Kenyan long-distance runner (born 1988)

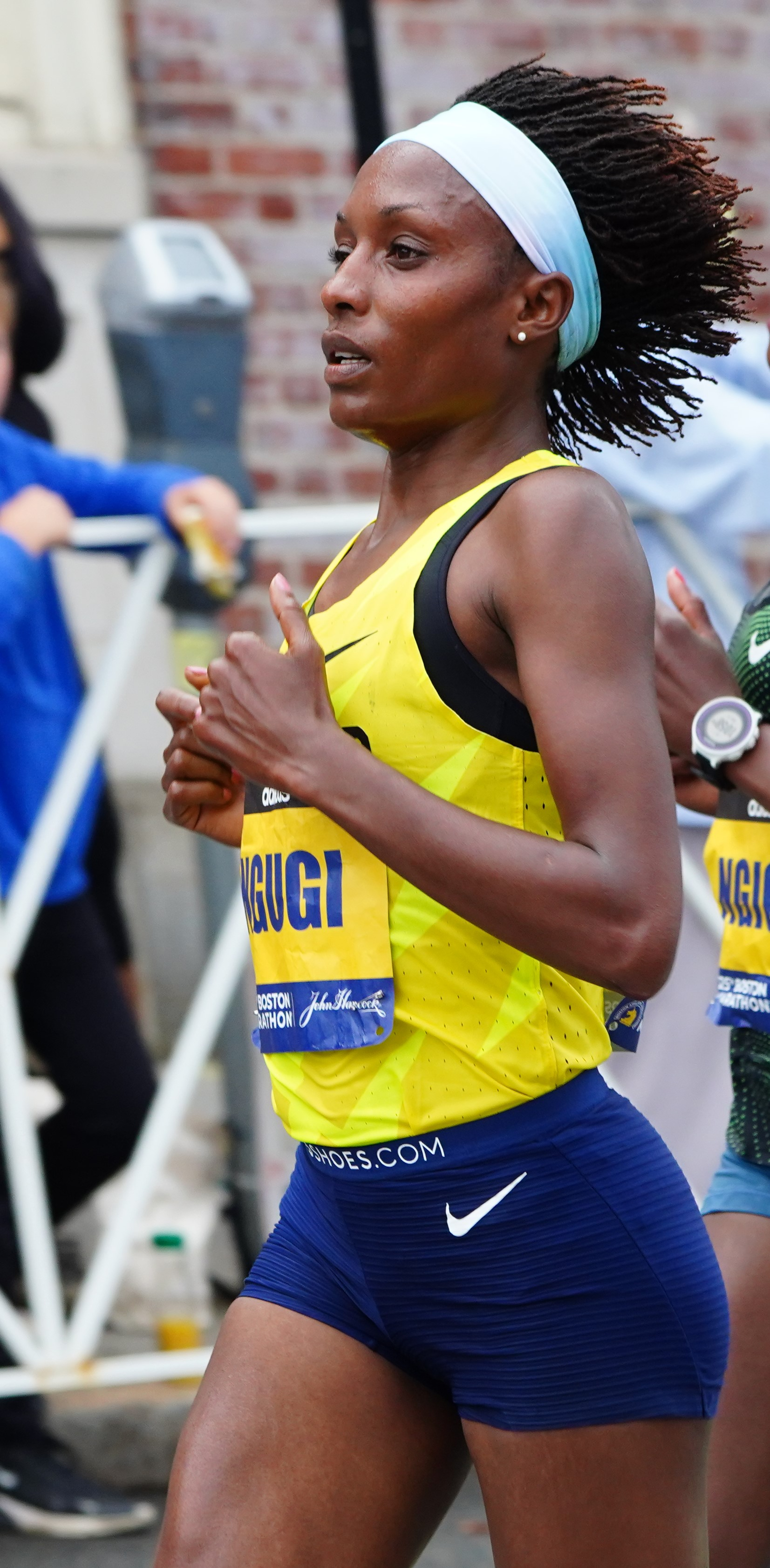
- Ngugi at mile 24 of the 2021 Boston Marathon in which she placed 3rd.

Personal information
- Nationality: Kenyan
- Born: Mary Wacera Ngugi; December 17, 1988 (age 37) Kenya

Sport
- Sport: Long-distance running
- Events: Marathon, Half marathon
Medal record
Representing Kenya
World Marathon Majors
Silver medal – second place	2021 Boston	Marathon
Bronze medal – third place	2022 Boston	Marathon
Bronze medal – third place	2026 Boston	Marathon
IAAF World Half Marathon Championships
Gold medal – first place	2014 Copenhagen	Team
Gold medal – first place	2016 Cardiff	Team
Silver medal – second place	2014 Copenhagen	Individual
Bronze medal – third place	2016 Cardiff	Individual

Mary Ngugi-Cooper (née Wacera Ngugi; born 17 December 1988) is a Kenyan long-distance runner who competes in road running events. She holds personal bests of 66:29 minutes for the half marathon, 30:50 minutes for the 10K run, and 2:27:36 for the marathon.

As a junior, she was a 5000 metres bronze medallist at the 2006 World Junior Championships in Athletics and the 2007 African junior champion. She is the widow of Samuel Wanjiru, the 2008 Olympic champion in the marathon, and had a daughter with him in 2010.

== Biography ==
=== Early career ===
Her first major international appearance was in the 5000 metres at the 2006 World Junior Championships in Athletics. In a strong field featuring future world champions Florence Kiplagat and Bai Xue, she took the bronze medal. She topped the 5000 m podium at the 2007 African Junior Athletics Championships, seeing off a challenge from the reigning world junior cross country champion Pauline Korikwiang.

She made her debut on the major European track circuit in 2008, running at the Golden Gala, but was some way off the winner. She won the Kenya Police title in the 5000 m that year. In 2009, she ran track bests of 8:55.89 minutes for the 3000 metres and 15:20.30 minutes for the 5000 m. She defended her Kenyan Police Championship title and also had some success in cross country running, placing at the Lotto Cross Cup de Hannut and winning the Le Mans Cross Country.

=== Marriage to Samuel Wanjiru ===
It was in 2009 that Wacera met Samuel Wanjiru, the 2008 Olympic marathon champion. The two ran at the same track in Nyahururu and soon bonded, with the pair legally marrying in December 2009. This caused relationship issues as Wanjiru already had two children by Terezah Njeri, whom he had married in a traditional ceremony, but not a legal one. Wacera, Njeri and Wanjiru's mother all lived on the same street and frequently argued with Wanjiru, who began drinking in excess and ceased his training. Wacera had a child with Wanjiru around August 2010 called Ann, after Wanjiru's mother. On St. Valentine's Day in 2011 Njeri and Wanjiru publicly reconciled on television and the runner swore that Njeri was his official wife, rather than Wacera.

Wanjiru had relationships with further women and on 15 May 2011 he returned to his residence with Jane Nduta, a waitress he was dating. Njeri arrived soon after and the women began arguing, resulting in Njeri leaving the residence in anger after locking Wanjiru and Nduta in the bedroom. Wanjiru fell off the upstairs balcony of his house and subsequently died due to the injuries he sustained in the fall. His death was ruled as suicide, although many family members suggested he was murdered and police did not properly conduct a forensic investigation of the scene. Wacera, Njeri and Wanjiru's mother were in dispute of the funeral arrangements and management of the estate, with Njeri claiming to be Wanjiru's legal wife at time of death and Wacera and Wanjiru's mother claiming that Wacera had that position, legally.

=== Return to running ===
Wacera began competing in road running competitions towards the end of 2012, including a 10K run best of 31:28 minutes and a win at the Semi Marathon Saint Denis in a time of 70:54 minutes. The former mark ranked her 11th in the world that year for the event. She made three outing ver the half marathon distance in 2013: she was third at the Nice Half Marathon and the Mardi Gras Half Marathon, but came only fifth at the Luanda Half Marathon. She also had success in her track specialty, coming second in the 5000 m at the Police Championships, before winning at the Kenyan Athletics Championships. She failed to finish at the trial event for the 2013 World Championships in Athletics, however.

At the start of 2014 she established herself among the top road runners by winning the World's Best 10K, defeating Gladys Cherono, Linet Masai and 2013 champion Joyce Chepkirui. Her first senior international medal followed in March at the 2014 IAAF World Half Marathon Championships. Part of a strong Kenyan women's team that won the team gold by taking all top five positions, Wacera ran a personal best of 67:44 minutes for second place behind Gladys Cherono.

On 17 January 2016, she won the Houston Half Marathon in 66:29. At the time, this was the United States all-comers records.

On 11 October 2021, she finished second in the Boston Marathon in 2:25:20.

On 18 April 2022, she returned to Boston to finish third in 2:21:32. Later that year, on 2 October, she set a new personal best of 2:20:22 at the London Marathon to finish seventh.

On 12 October 2025, at the age of 36, she broke the 2:20 barrier for the first time, running 2:19:26 to finish fifth at the Chicago Marathon.

On 20 April 2026, she once again finished third at the Boston Marathon in a time of 2:20:07. On 11 October 2026, she set a new personal best of 2:17:23 in Chicago to finish fourth. This was the second-fastest marathon run by a woman aged 35 or older, behind only Mary Keitany (2:17:01).

== Personal bests ==
- 3000 metres – 8:55.89 (2009)
- 5000 metres – 15:20.30 (2009)
- 5K run - 15:07 (2015)
- 10K run – 30:50 (2021)
- Half marathon – 66:29 (2016)
- Marathon – 2:17:23 (2026)

== Personal life ==
She is married to British photographer Chris Cooper.
