= Zach Panning =

American runner (born 1995)

Personal information
- Nationality: American
- Born: Zach Panning; March 29, 1995 (age 31)
- Home town: Fort Wayne, Indiana
- Education: Grand Valley State University

Sport
- Event(s): 1500 meters, 3000 meters, 5000 meters, 10,000 meters, 5K, 15K, 10K, mile, 10-mile, half marathon, marathon
- Club: Hansons-Brooks ODP

Achievements and titles
- Personal best(s): 1500m: 3:53.61; 3000m: 8:01.12; 3000m short track: 8:07.31; 5000m: 13:36.87; 5000m short track: 13:36.87; 10,000m: 27:51.20; 5K road: 14:12; 15K road: 43:32; Mile: 4:07.90; Mile short track: 4:15.80; Half marathon: 1:01:25; Marathon: 2:09:16

Zach Panning (born March 29, 1995) is an American long distance runner and marathoner. He ran collegiately at Grand Valley State University where he won an NCAA Division II Cross Country championship in 2018. He ran for team USA at the 2023 World Athletics Championships. Panning qualified for the 2024 United States Olympic marathon trials following the Chicago Marathon. At the trials, he finished 6th after leading for the majority of the race.

== Running career ==
=== High school ===
Panning attended Concordia Lutheran High School in Fort Wayne, Indiana. At the 2013 IHSAA state xc meet, he led for most of the race, but fell when he was 100m from the finish. He lost his lead, ultimately finishing in 22nd place, before getting medical attention. That spring, he finished 4th in the state in the 3200m.

=== College ===
Panning originally committed to Temple University, but the school cut their track program shortly after. Instead, he attended Grand Valley State University, where he ran cross country and track. In 2015, his first season with the Lakers, he redshirted. In his first collegiate track season, Panning received U.S. Track & Field and Cross Country Coaches Association All-America honors for both the indoor and outdoor 5,000 meter races. In his junior and senior year he established himself among the upper echelon of Division II collegiate running, winning national titles in the outdoor 5,000 and 10,000 meter races, as well as the team-awarded Mike Lynch award. In 2018, GVSU won the D2 cross country national championship. In the championship race, Panning placed second overall, despite falling in the first 30 meters, finishing the 10k course in 31:53.6 as the first scoring member on his team and second overall.

=== Professional ===
Panning is a member of the Hanson Brooks Original Distance project, based in Rochester Hills, Michigan, where he is coached by Keith and Kevin Hanson. He ran at the 2022 Chicago Marathon, where he placed second among Americans and qualified for the 2024 Olympic trials. He won the 2023 Bank of America Shamrock Shuffle 8000 meter run. Panning competed in the 2023 World Athletics Championships in Budapest. He was the leading American in the marathon, finishing with a time of 2:11:21 and 13th place. He moved up from 39th place halfway through the event. At the 2024 Olympic trials, Panning made an early move and upped the pace on the sixth mile. He would ultimately lead the men's race for the majority of the 26.2 miles, only to fade on the 23rd mile and drop to third place, still in place to qualify for the 2024 Summer Olympics. However, he was passed again on the 25th mile before ultimately falling to sixth place. After the race, Panning was praised for upping the ante and increasing the excitement of the race.

== Notable marathon results ==
Taken from World Athletics profile

Year	Race	Place	Time
2021	Chicago Marathon	11th	2:15:04
2022	Chicago Marathon	11th	2:09:28
2023	World Athletics Championships	12th	2:11:21
2024	United States Olympic trials	6th	2:10:50
2024	Chicago Marathon	10th	2:09:16
2025	Boston Marathon	32nd	2:16:47
