= Emma Bates =

American long-distance runner (born 1992)

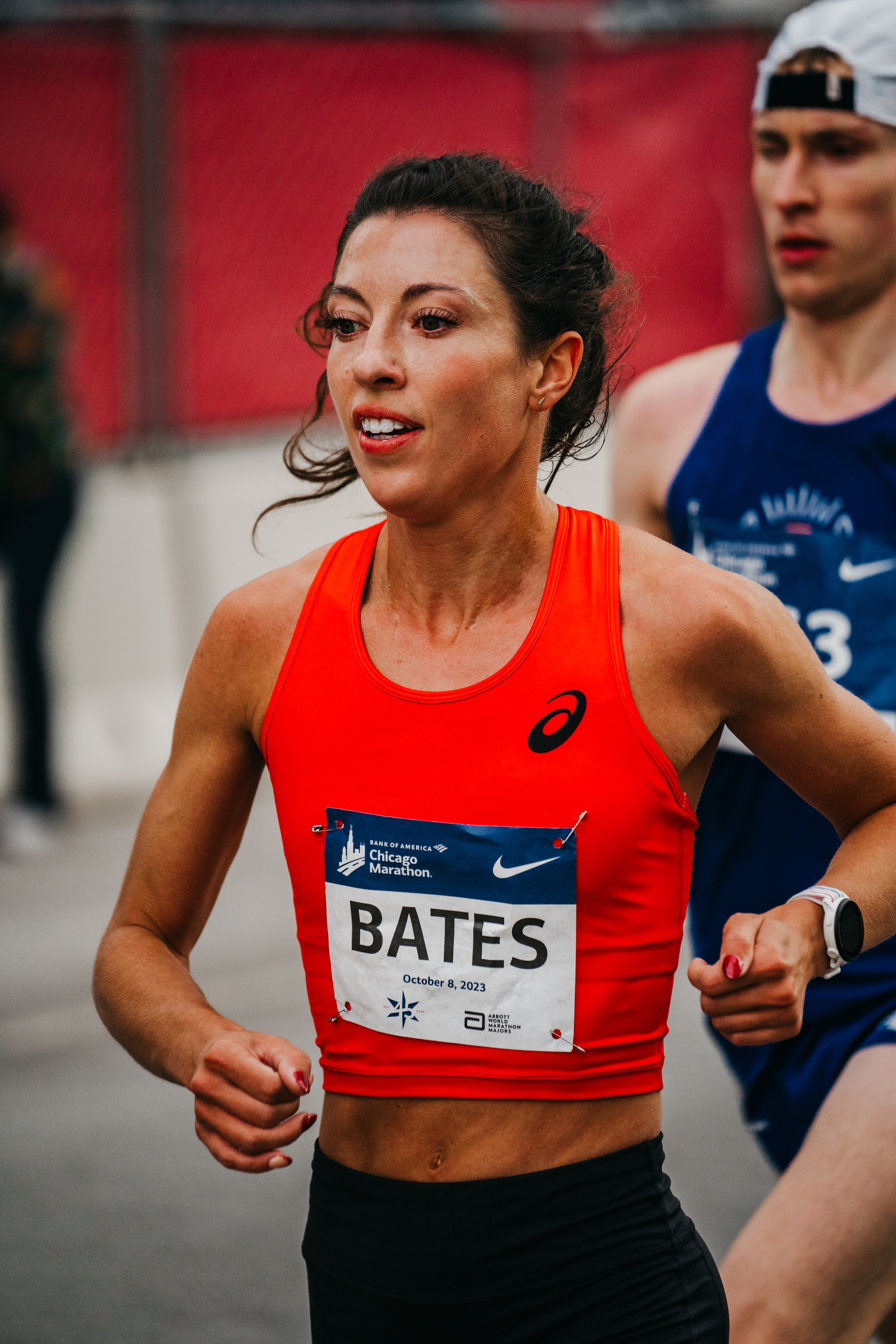
- Bates at the 2023 Chicago Marathon

Personal information
- Born: July 8, 1992 (age 34) Elk River, Minnesota, U.S.
- Height: 5 ft 4 in (1.63 m)

Sport
- Country: United States
- Events: 5000 m, 10,000 m, cross country running, road racing
- College team: Boise State Broncos
- Club: Asics
- Turned pro: July 2015
- Coached by: Joe Bosshard

Achievements and titles
- Personal bests: 1500 m: 4:16.37 (Walnut 2015); 3000 m: 9:08.78 i (New York 2017); 5000 m: 15:32.46 (Palo Alto 2015); 10000 m: 32:04.59 (Irvine 2021); Marathon: 2:22:10 a (Boston 2023)
Medal record
Women's athletics
Representing the United States
World Marathon Majors
Silver medal – second place	2021 Chicago	Marathon

Emma Bates (born July 8, 1992) is an American long-distance runner who competes in the marathon. Her achievements include winning the USA Marathon Championships in 2018, placing second in the 2021 Chicago Marathon, and finishing fifth in the 2023 Boston Marathon. Bates represented the United States in the marathon at the 2022 World Athletics Championships, where she set a personal best of 2:23.18 and finished seventh. Her highest position on the World Athletics Rankings was No. 14 in the marathon in July 2022.

In college, Bates competed for Boise State University, where she was a 12-time All-American. She won the 10,000 meters at the 2014 NCAA Division I Outdoor Track and Field Championships and was the runner-up in the 2013 NCAA Division I Cross Country Championships. Bates turned professional in June 2015 and was associated with the Boston Athletic Association until 2017. In January 2021, she signed a multi-year sponsorship deal with the sports company Asics. Bates trains with the distance group Team Boss.

== Running career ==
=== High school and college ===
Encouraged by her parents to channel her energy, Bates began running in 6th grade. She attended Elk River High School in Minnesota, graduating in 2010. During her senior year, she achieved runner-up in the state cross country championships and led her team to a state title. She recorded personal bests of 11:08.25 for 3200 m and 5:00.13 for 1600 m. Bates has said she took a relaxed approach to training in high school. In a 2013 interview, she recalled, “On easy days, my teammates and I would often not even run — we’d go to the grocery store and get donuts or something.”

Bates attended Boise State University in Idaho, where she was a 12-time All American in the NCAA. She specialized in the 10000 m, placing third in this event at the 2013 NCAA Track and Field Championship. The following year, she won the event in 32:32.35, the second-fastest time in the championship's history. She was the runner-up at the 2013 NCAA Cross Country Championships behind Abbey D'Agostino. She finished third at the 2014 NCAA Cross Country Championships.

=== Professional ===
==== 2015 -2017 ====
After graduating from Boise State, Bates moved to Boston, Massachusetts, and began competing professionally for the Boston Athletic Association (BAA) in July 2015 as part of the High Performance Group. During this early phase of her career, Bates competed in several distances. Her fastest times in 2016 included a 4:22.48 in the 1500 metres and a 56:00 in the ten-mile race. Bates finished 21st at the 2016 USA Track and Field Championships. A shift in Bates' focus occurred in 2017 as she shifted from track to longer-distance events. She made her half marathon debut at the Des Moines Half Marathon on October 15, 2017, which she won with a time of 1:15:10.

Bates faced challenges in her first few years a professional runner after joining the BAA. In an interview with ESPN, she said, "I was not enjoying life in Boston, not enjoying running like I once did and did not fully believe in the training program I was a part of." By the end of 2017, Bates decided to leave the BAA and return to Idaho. There, she established a new training group called the Idaho Distance Project.

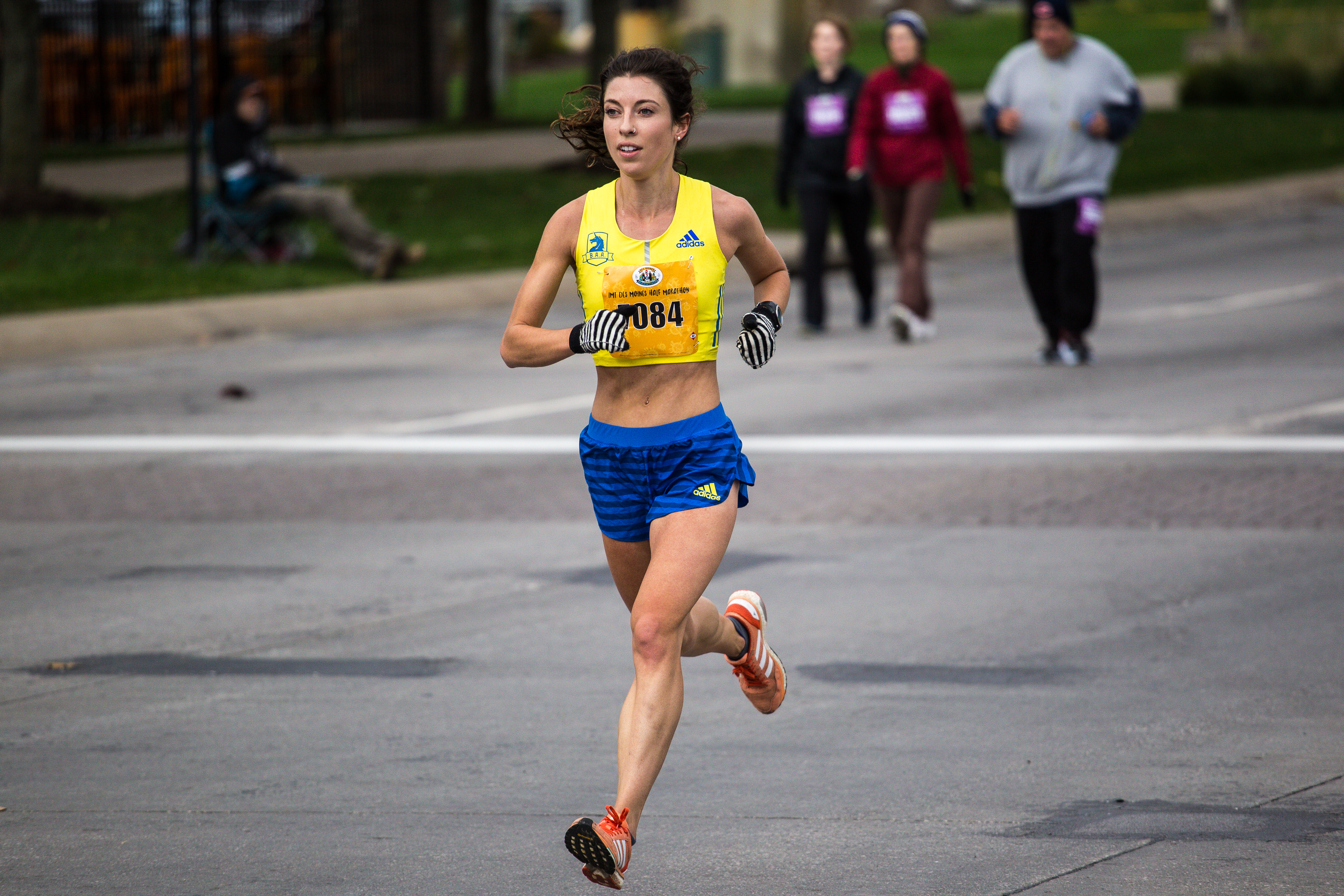
Bates at the Des Moines Half Marathon in 2017, her debut at the distance.

==== 2018 - 2019 ====
Bates participated in various road races within the USATF Running Circuit. These races included third place finishes at the US 20 km Road Running Championships and the US 10M Road Running Championships. The circuit operates on a points system in which athletes earn points according to their finishes; the better the finish, the more points gained. Bates's high finishes allowed her to accumulate enough points to win the 2018 USATF Running Circuit.

Bates competed in two half marathons in 2018. Her first half marathon was at the Doha Half Marathon on January 12, where she placed fourth with a time of 1:12:52. She then improved her personal best at the 2018 IAAF World Half Marathon Championships on March 24, finishing in 1:11:45 and placing 27th; she was the fastest American woman in the race.

Bates capped the year by participating in the California International Marathon on December 2. This race also served as the USA Marathon Championships. In this race, her first-ever marathon, she won with a time of 2:28:19. Her win came despite stopping multiple times to vomit in the latter half of the course. During her peak training for this event, she logged 110–115 miles per week.

In January 2019, Bates attained a professional sponsorship deal from the sportswear company Asics. Her first race representing Asics was at the New York City Half Marathon on March 17, 2019, where she finished fourth. Two months later on May 5, 2019, Bates came third in the USA Half Marathon Championships. In her second-attempt at the marathon, Bates placed fourth in the 2019 Chicago Marathon on October 13. She was the first American to finish and recorded a mark of 2:25:27. The race featured strong competition, including a world record set by the first-place finisher, Brigid Kosgei.

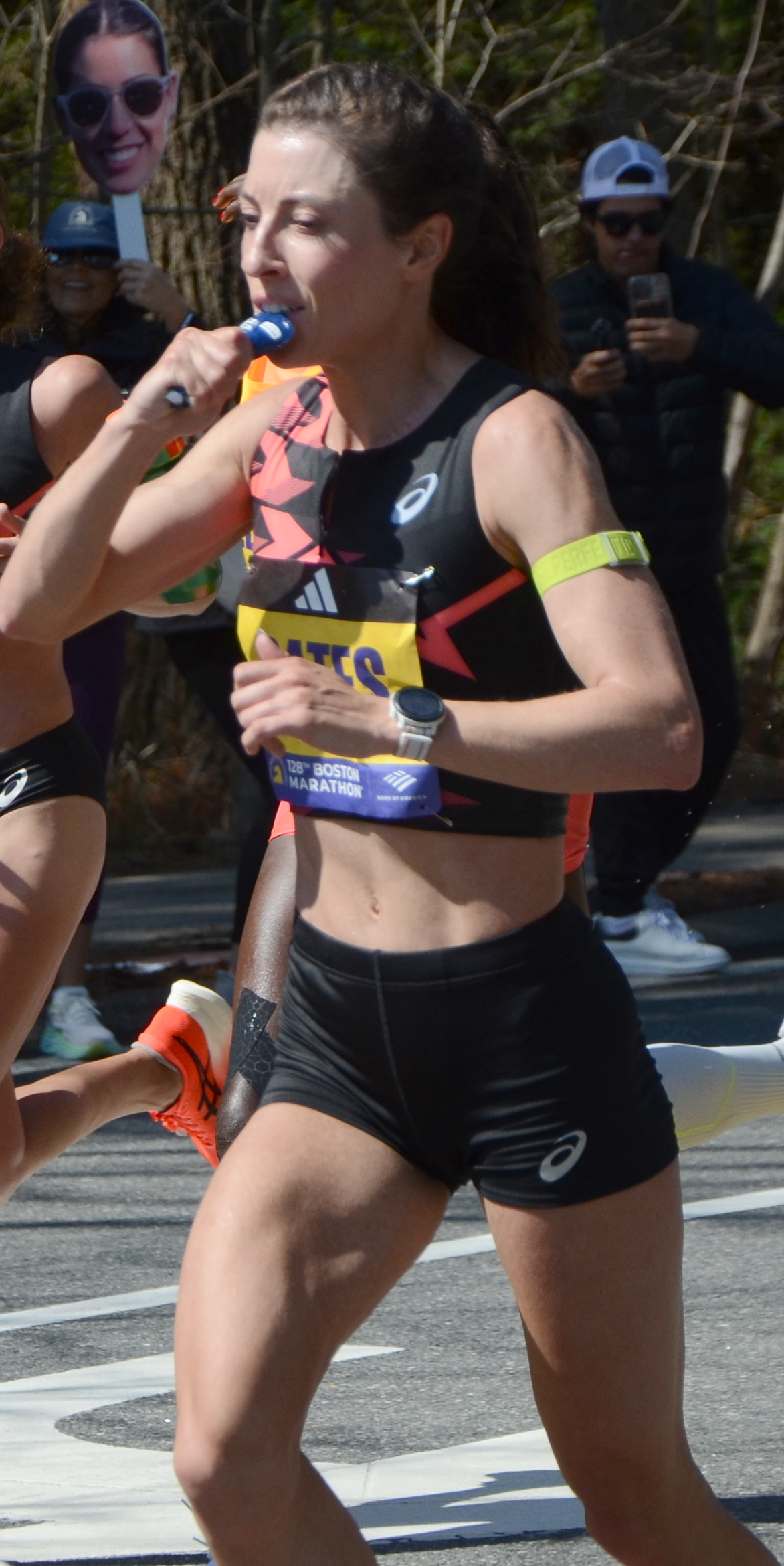
Bates near halfway point in 2024 Boston Marathon in which she came in 12th

==== 2020 - 2021 ====
On 29 February 2020, Bates competed in the 2020 United States Olympic trials marathon in Atlanta, Georgia. She finished in seventh place, outside of the top three needed to qualify for the 2020 Summer Games. Afterward, her competition was limited due to the COVID-19 pandemic. She returned to competition on October 28, 2020 at the Michigan Pro Half Marathon. She came in second and achieved a personal best of 1:09:44. Her last race of the year was at the Marathon Project in Chandler, Arizona, where she placed fourth in 2:25:40.

In April 2021, Bates relocated to Boulder, Colorado to join Team Boss, a training group led by coach Joe Bosshard. She competed in the 10000 m at the U.S. Olympic Trials to finish 29th in 33:21.00. On October 10, she competed in the 2021 Chicago Marathon in 2:24:20 to take second. This was her first podium finish in a World Marathon Majors.

==== 2022 - 2023 ====
On 18 July 2022, Bates participated in the marathon at the 2022 World Athletics Championships in Eugene, Oregon. She placed seventh in 2:23:18, setting a personal best and finishing with one of the strongest ever American contingents (Sara Hall was fifth, Keira D'Amato was eighth). On November 6, she ran 2:26:53 in the New York City Marathon to finish eighth.

In 2023, Bates competed in two marathons. Her first was the Boston Marathon, where she finished fifth with a time of 2:22:10, averaging 5:27 per mile and leading for most of the race. Her performance came during intermittent rain and headwinds, and it was just shy of the fastest time by an American woman on this course, narrowly missing Shalane Flanagan's record of 2:22:02. While Bates achieved a personal best in this race, her time is not considered legal for record purposes by World Athletics due to the course's net downhill elevation. On October 8, she finished 13th in the Chicago Marathon with a time of 2:25:04. She reached the halfway point in 69:31 but completed the second half in 75:33 due to pain in her foot.

==== 2024 ====
Bates announced on January 6 that she would not participate in the 2024 US Olympic Trials, held in February. The announcement followed a foot-related injury sustained by Bates during her running of the 2023 Chicago Marathon the previous October. In April, she was the top American woman to finish at the Boston Marathon and finished 12th overall.

==== 2025 ====
At the 2025 Boston Marathon Bates finished 13th overall and was the 3rd American, finishing in 02:25:10.

== Personal life ==
Bates is an avid backpacker and enjoys hiking in the Sawtooth Range. In 2017, she moved to a remote cabin in the Boise National Forest that offered secluded trails for running. The cabin was solar powered, with no television or cellular service. Bates was married to Kameron Ulmer from 2019 to 2021.

In 2023, Outside Magazine released an article about Bates' relationship with her partner, Steve Finley. The article described how her partner helps her cope with the pressures of elite competition.

In 2026, Bates gave birth to a baby boy named Warren Finley. She alleged one of her sponsors, sports nutrition brand UCAN, had dropped her upon learning of her pregnancy.

== Competition record ==
Year	Competition	Venue	Position	Event	Notes
Representing the United States
2016	Great Edinburgh International Cross Country	Edinburgh, Scotland	28th	6 km	23:05
2018	2018 IAAF World Half Marathon Championships	Valencia, Spain	27th	Half Marathon	1:11:45
2022	2022 World Athletics Championships	Eugene, Oregon	7th	Marathon	2:23:18
Representing Boise State Broncos
2014	USA Outdoor Track and Field Championships	Sacramento, California	6th	10,000 meters	32:51.49
2015	USA Outdoor Track and Field Championships	Eugene, Oregon	11th	10,000 meters	34:02.65
Representing Boston Athletic Association
2015	USA Women's 10 km Road Championships	Boston, MA	16th	10 km	33:54
2015	USA Women's 12 km Road Championships	Alexandria, VA	10th	12 km	39:50
2015	USATF National Club Cross Country Championships	San Francisco, California	5th	6,000 meters	20:02
Unattached
2018	USA Women's 10 km Road Championships	Atlanta Georgia	6th	10 km	33:15
2018	USA Women's Marathon Championships	Sacramento, CA	1st	Marathon	2:28:18
2018	USATF National Club Cross Country Championships	Spokane, WA	8th	6,000 meters	19:56
Representing Asics
2019	USA Half Marathon Championships	Pittsburgh, Pennsylvania	3rd	Half-Marathon	1:11:13
2019	USA 25 km Road Championship	Grand Rapids, Michigan	1st	25 km	1:23:51
2019	Chicago Marathon	Chicago, Illinois	4th	Marathon	2:25:27
2020	US Olympic Marathon Trials	Atlanta Georgia	7th	Marathon	2:29:35
2021	USA 15 km Road Championship	Jacksonville, Florida	12th	15 km	50:42
2021	Chicago Marathon	Chicago, Illinois	2nd	Marathon	2:24:20
2022	New York City Marathon	New York, New York	8th	Marathon	2:26:53
2023	Boston Marathon	Boston, Massachusetts	5th	Marathon	2:22:10 PB
2024	Boston Marathon	Boston, Massachusetts	12th	Marathon	2:27:14
2025	Boston Marathon	Boston, Massachusetts	8th	Marathon	02:23:21

=== NCAA championships ===
==== Outdoor track and field ====
Year	Competition	Venue	Position	Event	Notes
Representing Boise State
2012	NCAA Outdoor Track and Field Championships	Des Moines, Iowa	12th	5000 m	16:43.84
2013	NCAA Outdoor Track and Field Championships	Eugene, Oregon	7th	5000 m	15:59.35
2013	NCAA Outdoor Track and Field Championships	Eugene, Oregon	3rd	10,000 m	33:37.13
2014	NCAA Outdoor Track and Field Championships	Eugene, Oregon	4th	5000 m	15:51.87
2014	NCAA Outdoor Track and Field Championships	Eugene, Oregon	1st	10,000 m	32:32.35
2015	NCAA Outdoor Track and Field Championships	Eugene, Oregon	5th	5000 m	15:56.72
2015	NCAA Outdoor Track and Field Championships	Eugene, Oregon	10th	10,000 m	33:50.14

==== Indoor track and field ====
Year	Competition	Venue	Position	Event	Notes
Representing Boise State
2013	NCAA Indoor Track and Field Championships	Fayetteville, Arkansas	14th	5000 m	16:08.56
2014	NCAA Indoor Track and Field Championships	Albuquerque, New Mexico	4th	3000 m	9:17.37
2014	NCAA Indoor Track and Field Championships	Albuquerque, New Mexico	4th	5000 m	16:25.66

==== Cross country ====
Year	Competition	Venue	Position	Notes
Representing Boise State
2013	NCAA Cross Country Championships	Terre Haute, Indiana	2nd	20:03.9
2014	NCAA Cross Country Championships	Terre Haute, Indiana	3rd	19:44.5

=== Conference championships ===
==== Outdoor track and field ====
Year	Competition	Venue	Position	Event	Notes
Representing Boise State
2012	Mountain West Outdoor Track and Field Championships	Colorado Springs, Colorado	1st	5000 m	17:08.36
2013	Mountain West Outdoor Track and Field Championships	Las Vegas, Nevada	1st	10,000 m	36:09.92
2014	Mountain West Outdoor Track and Field Championships	Laramie, Wyoming	1st	5000 m	17:37.68
2014	Mountain West Outdoor Track and Field Championships	Laramie, Wyoming	1st	1500 m	4:40.06
2015	Mountain West Outdoor Track and Field Championships	San Diego, California	4th	1500 m	4:33.08

==== Indoor track and field ====
Year	Competition	Venue	Position	Event	Notes
Representing Boise State
2012	Mountain West Outdoor Track and Field Championships	Albuquerque, New Mexico	1st	3000 m	9:47.51
2012	Mountain West Outdoor Track and Field Championships	Albuquerque, New Mexico	5th	5000 m	17:11.34
2013	Mountain West Indoor Track and Field Championships	Nampa, Idaho	1st	3000 m	9:36.46
2013	Mountain West Indoor Track and Field Championships	Nampa, Idaho	2nd	Mile	4:42.49
2014	Mountain West Indoor Track and Field Championships	Colorado Springs, Colorado	1st	3000 m	9:28.18

==== Cross country ====
Year	Competition	Venue	Position	Notes
Representing Boise State
2010	WAC Cross Country Championships	Moscow, Idaho	3rd	17:42.68
2011	Mountain West Cross Country Championships	Fort Collins, Colorado	11th	21:33.1
2013	Mountain West Cross Country Championships	Colorado Springs, Colorado	1st	20:48.2
2014	Mountain West Cross Country Championships	Fresno, California	1st	19:37.3
