= 2024 Chicago Marathon =

26.2 mi (42.195 km) race in Illinois, U.S.

46th Chicago Marathon
- Location: Chicago, Illinois, U.S.
- Dates: October 13, 2024 (12 months ago)
- Website: chicagomarathon.com

Champions
- Men: John Korir (2:02:44)
- Women: Ruth Chepng'etich (2:09:56 WR)
- Wheelchair men: Marcel Hug (1:25:54)
- Wheelchair women: Catherine Debrunner (1:36:12 CR)

The 2024 Chicago Marathon was the 46th edition of the annual Chicago Marathon, held on October 13, 2024. The race is the fifth of six World Marathon Majors held in 2024, and is a platinum label race.

The marathon had 120,000 applications in 2024. The number of finishers was 52,150, breaking the 48,398 finisher record set in 2023. Notably, in June, the race organizers announced a reduction in the automatic time qualifying standard that will begin in 2025.

A moment of silence was held at the start of the race in honor of the 2023 race winner, course and world record holder, Kelvin Kiptum, who died in February 2024.

== Background ==
External image
- Course map in 2024

The Chicago Marathon has a reputation of being one of the fastest marathon courses in the world due to the flat course and favorable autumn temperatures. The Chicago Marathon had been the site of six world records in the distance, with the most recent prior race coming in 2023 when Kelvin Kiptum set a world record of 2:00:35. His compatriot Ruth Chepng'etich went on to win a women's world record in 2024 adding a 7th race.

== Competitors ==
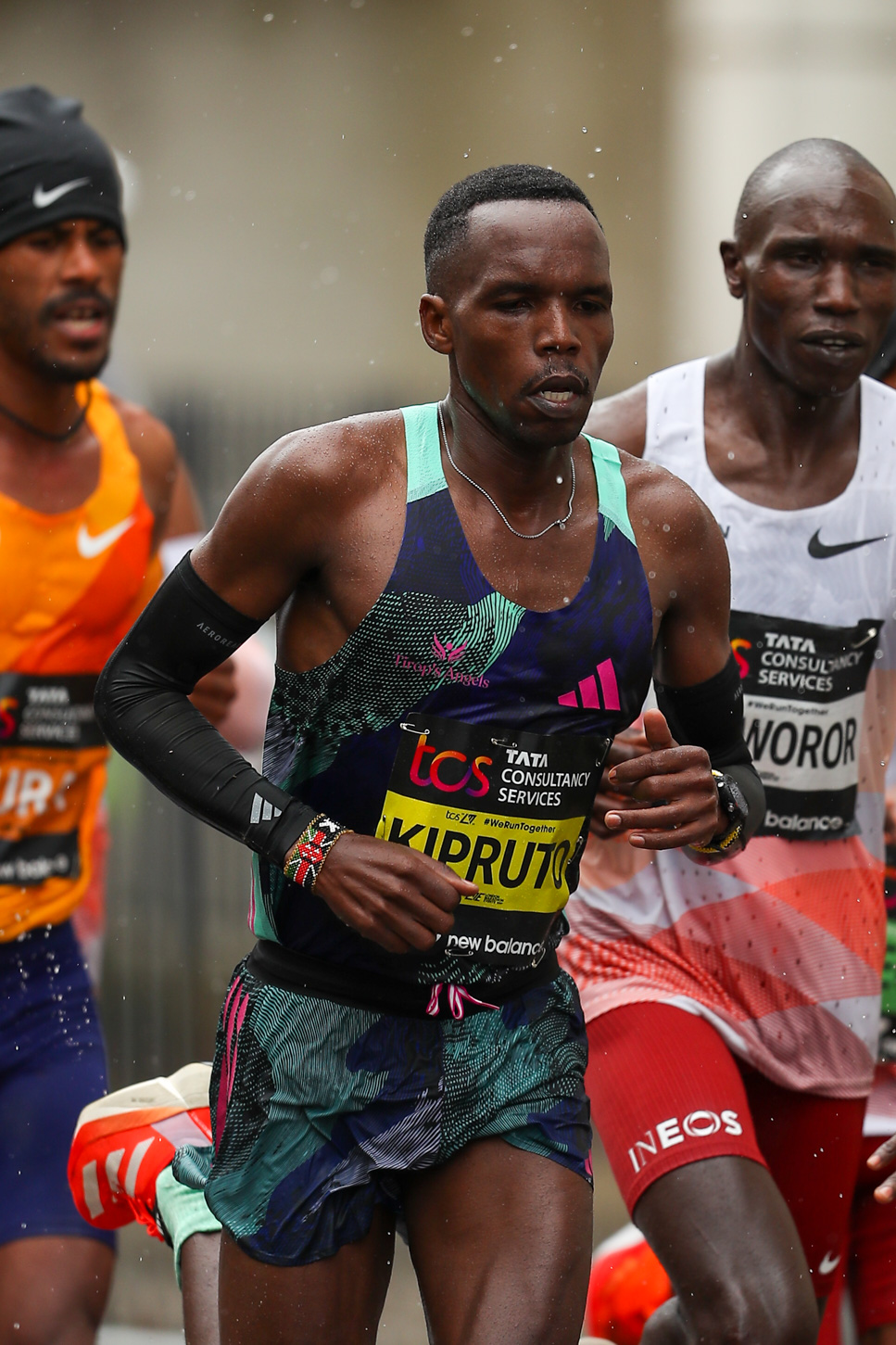
Amos Kipruto competing in the 2023 London Marathon

Kenyan Amos Kipruto headlined the men's race with a 2:03:13 PB and 2022 London Marathon victory. He will be challenged by fellow countryman Vincent Ngetich who has an identical PB of 2:03:13 and a second pace finish at the 2023 Berlin Marathon. Zach Panning was the fastest American in the field, coming off a 6th pace finish at the 2024 Olympic Trials and a 2:09:28 finish at the 2022 Chicago Marathon. Daniel Ebenyo, from Kenya made his debut at the distance following his runner-up finish at the 2023 World Athletics Championships 10,000 meter run.

The 2021 and 2022 Chicago Marathon champion, Ruth Chepngetich of Kenya held the fastest entry at 2:14:18. Sutume Kebede, the eighth fastest women's marathoner is entered at a 2:15:55. Kebede was a former training partner of Kelvin Kiptum who was the 2023 Chicago Marathon champion before dying in a car accident in February of 2024. Betsy Saina and Keira D'Amato, two of the three fastest American women marathoners entered at 2:19:17 and 2:19:12, respectively.

Marcel Hug from Switzerland attempted to win his fifth Chicago victory. Hug was coming off a Paralympic gold medal in the distance. Aaron Pike from the United States entered second at 2:20:02 and was the top American in the field.

World Record holder and defending champion Catherine Debrunner from Switzerland also competed in the marathon. Susannah Scaroni from the United States was the top ranked entry and was the 2022 Chicago champion.

== Race ==
To honor Kelvin Kiptum, the 2023 champion and current world record holder who died in February of 2024, there was a moment of silence at the starting of the race as well as tribute stickers for athletes to wear on the course.

The mens field started the race strong, passing the course pacers after ten minutes and the leaders crossing the 5K mark in 14:43 with Dawit Wolde Arega from Ethiopia leading the pack early. Through 10K, the leading men split 29:27 as they hold 2:04:20 marathon pace. Ten men were in the lead pack, with top Americans Zach Panning and CJ Albertson in the chase pack. The top pack of ten men continued to through 15K in 44:15 before crossing the half marathon mark in 1:02:19. The lead pack fell to only nine as John Korir from Kenya took command, leading the group through 30K on 2:04:12 pace. Korir began to surge and by 35K he had a 30 second gap on the field on 2:03:21 pace. He continued to extend his lead through 40K where he was 90 seconds ahead of the chase pack, on 2:02:50 pace. Korir won the race with a time of 2:02:44, the second fastest time in the race history behind Kelvin Kiptum, who set the world record in the distance at the 2023 Chicago Marathon. Ethiopian Huseydin Mohamed Esa finished second in 2:04:39.

The women's race began with Ruth Chepng'etich settling in with a pack of elite men, joined by pacers Barnabas Kiptum and Evans Nyakamba. She split 5K at 15:00, running at 2:06:35 pace, well ahead of the world record of 2:11:53. Ethiopian Sutume Asefa Kebede settled in with Chepng'etich through 10K crossing the mark at 30:14. By the time they were 15K into the race, the two had opened a two minute lead on the field as Chepng'etich crossed the mark at 45:32. At the half marathon mark, Chepng'etich opened a 14 second lead on second place, on pace for a 2:08:31 marathon. She split a 1:04:16, which marks the fastest women's half marathon ran in the United States and the fifth fastest half marathon of all time. At the 30K mark, she had extended her lead to 2 minutes, however, she had slowed slightly as she was on marathon pace for 2:09:09. She continued to slow through 35K as she held a 2:09:35 marathon pace. Chepng'etich finished in 2:09:56, a world record by nearly two minutes, and became the first women to break 2:10:00 in the marathon. Sutume Asefa Kebede finished second in 2:17:32.

== Results ==
The Chicago Marathon began on October 13 at 7:20am.

=== Men ===
Elite men's top 10 finishers
| Position | Athlete | Nationality | Time |
|---|---|---|---|
| 1st place, gold medalist(s) | John Korir | Kenya | 2:02:44 |
| 2nd place, silver medalist(s) | Mohamed Esa | Ethiopia | 2:04:39 |
| 3rd place, bronze medalist(s) | Amos Kipruto | Kenya | 2:04:50 |
| 4 | Vincent Ngeitch | Kenya | 2:05:16 |
| 5 | Daniel Ebenyo | Kenya | 2:06:04 |
| 6 | Kyohei Hosoya | Japan | 2:07:20 |
| 7 | CJ Albertson | United States | 2:08:17 |
| 8 | Toshiki Sadakata | Japan | 2:08:22 |
| 9 | Alex Masai | Kenya | 2:08:51 |
| 10 | Zach Panning | United States | 2:09:16 |

=== Women ===
Elite women's top 10 finishers
| Position | Athlete | Nationality | Time |
|---|---|---|---|
| 1st place, gold medalist(s) | Ruth Chepngetich | Kenya | 2:09:56 WR |
| 2nd place, silver medalist(s) | Sutume Kebede | Ethiopia | 2:17:32 |
| 3rd place, bronze medalist(s) | Irine Cheptai | Kenya | 2:17:51 |
| 4 | Buze Diriba | Ethiopia | 2:20:22 |
| 5 | Joyciline Jepkosgei | Kenya | 2:20:51 |
| 6 | Degitu Azimeraw | Ethiopia | 2:20:52 |
| 7 | Susanna Sullivan | United States | 2:21:56 |
| 8 | Ashete Bekere | Ethiopia | 2:23:10 |
| 9 | Lindsay Flanagan | United States | 2:23:31 |
| 10 | Stacy Ndiwa | Kenya | 2:23:42 |
