= Milano City Marathon =

Italian marathon race

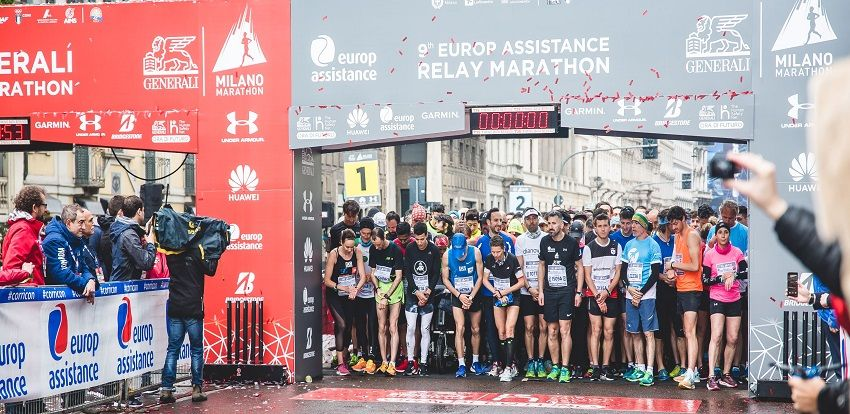
- Start line in 2019
- Date: Early April
- Location: Milan, Italy
- Event type: Road
- Distance: Marathon
- Primary sponsor: Wizz Air
- Established: 2000
- Course records: Men's: 2:02:57 (2021) (Kenya) Titus Ekiru; Women's: 2:19:35 (2021) (Ethiopia) Hiwot Gebrekidan
- Website: Milano City Marathon
- Participants: 6,918 finishers (2024)

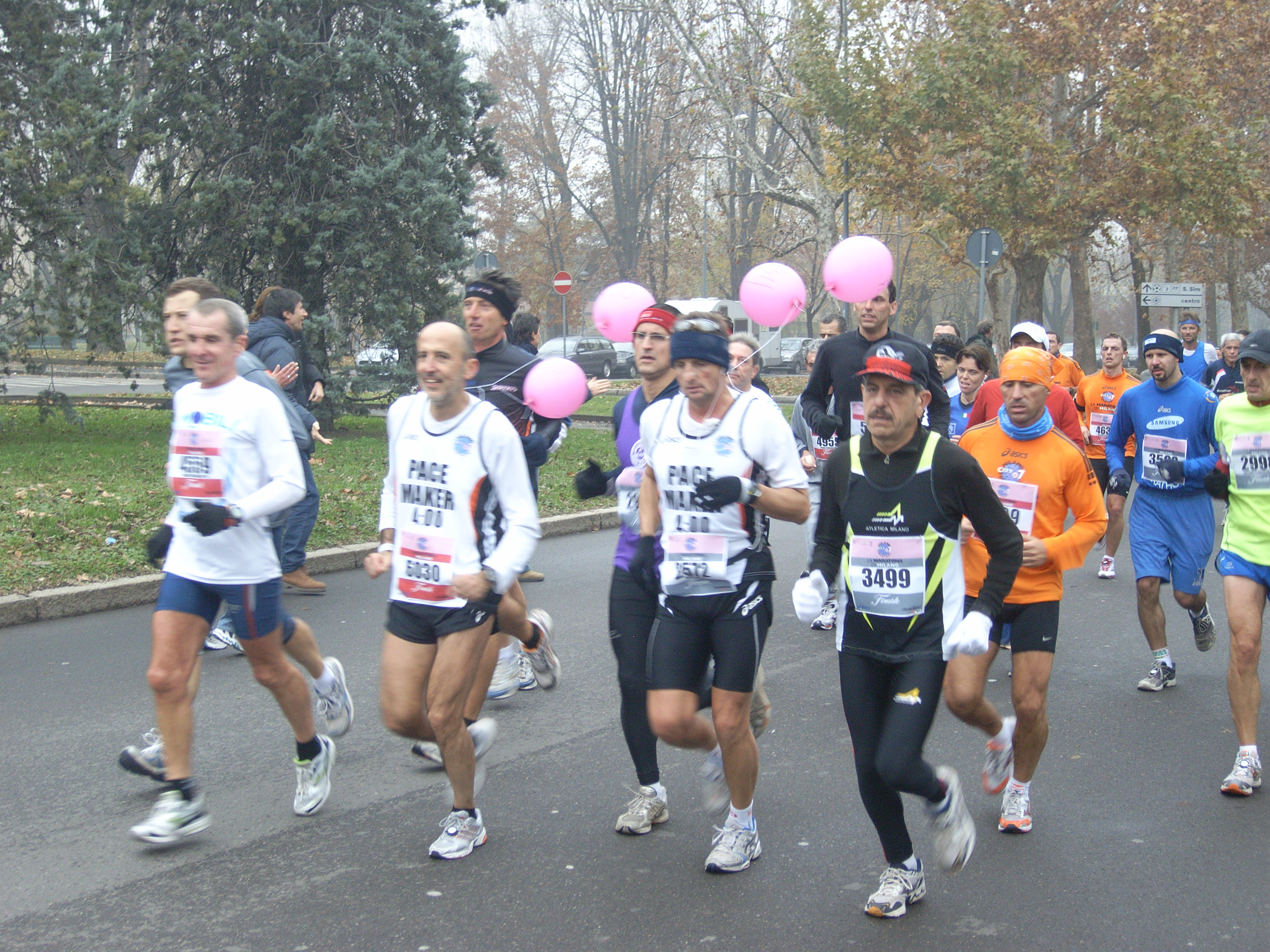
The public race in 2007

The Milano City Marathon is a marathon race held every April in Milan, Italy. It was first organised in 2000 by the Milano City Marathon Club and the first nine editions were held in November.

== History ==
The 2009 edition of the race, initially set for November 2009, was shifted to April the following year. The newly scheduled event featured a marathon, half marathon, and relay marathon event. The move proved popular and at least 7213 runners took part in the activities that year. At the 2011 edition, the marathon and relay events saw more than five thousand participants each, making a record total of 10,203 runners.

Barclays Bank became the title sponsor in 2012 and 13569 people participated in the day's events, including the marathon and relay races.

The 20th edition of the race, originally scheduled for 2020, was postponed to 2021 due to the coronavirus pandemic and lockdown of Italy, with all registrants given the option of receiving a 100% discount code for the 20th edition, an 80% discount for the 21st, a 60% discount for the 22nd, or a 40% discount for the 23rd.

== Winners ==
Key: Course record

Ed.	Year	Men	Nationality	Time	Women	Nationality	Time
23rd	2024	Titus Kimutai	Kenya	2:07:14	Tigist Memuye	Ethiopia	2:26:32
22nd	2023	Andrew Kwemoi	Uganda	2:07:12	Sharon Cherop	Kenya	2:26:13
21st	2022	Titus Kipruto	Kenya	2:05:05	Vivian Kiplagat	Kenya	2:20:18
20th (Note: The 2021 edition was a special edition, reserved to 120 elite runners, on a 7.5 km lap repeated 5 times with a first lap of 4.695 km.)	2021	Reuben Kipyego	Kenya	2:03:55 (Note: after the disqualification of Titus Ekiru)	Hiwot Gebrekidan	Ethiopia	2:19:35
	2020	postponed due to coronavirus pandemic					
19th	2019	Titus Ekiru	Kenya	2:04:46	Vivian Kiplagat	Kenya	2:22:25
18th	2018	Seifu Tura	Ethiopia	2:09:04	Lucy Kabuu	Kenya	2:27:02
17th	2017	Edwin Koech	Kenya	2:07:13	Sheila Chepkoech	Kenya	2:29:52
16th	2016	Ernest Ngeno	Kenya	2:08:15	Brigid Kosgei	Kenya	2:27:45
15th	2015	Kenneth Mungara	Kenya	2:08:44	Lucy Karimi	Kenya	2:27:35
14th	2014	Francis Kiprop	Kenya	2:08:53	Visiline Jepkesho	Kenya	2:28:40
13th	2013	Gemechu Worku	Ethiopia	2:09:25	Monica Jepkoech	Kenya	2:32:54
12th	2012	Daniel Too	Kenya	2:08:39	Irene Kosgei	Kenya	2:31:07
11th	2011	Solomon Busendich	Kenya	2:10:38	Marcella Mancini	Italy	2:41.24
10th	2010	Jafred Kipchumba	Kenya	2:09:15	Asnakech Mengistu	Ethiopia	2:25:50
	2009	shifted regular schedule forward from November to April					
9th	2008	Duncan Kibet	Kenya	2:07:53	Anna Incerti	Italy	2:27:42
8th	2007	Evans Cheruiyot	Kenya	2:09:16	Pamela Chepchumba	Kenya	2:25:36
7th	2006	Benson Cherono	Kenya	2:07:58	Askale Tafa	Ethiopia	2:27:57
6th	2005	Hélder Ornelas	Portugal	2:10:00	Hellen Kimutai	Kenya	2:28:49
5th	2004	Daniel Cheribo	Kenya	2:08:38	Rita Jeptoo	Kenya	2:28:11
4th	2003	John Birgen	Kenya	2:09:08	Anne Jelagat	Kenya	2:29:23
3rd	2002	Robert Cheruiyot	Kenya	2:08:59	Margaret Okayo	Kenya	2:24:59
2nd	2001	John Saya	Tanzania	2:08:57	Alice Chelangat	Kenya	2:26:36
1st	2000	Simon Biwott	Kenya	2:09:00	Lucilla Andreucci	Italy	2:29:43
