= Susanna Sullivan =

American distance runner

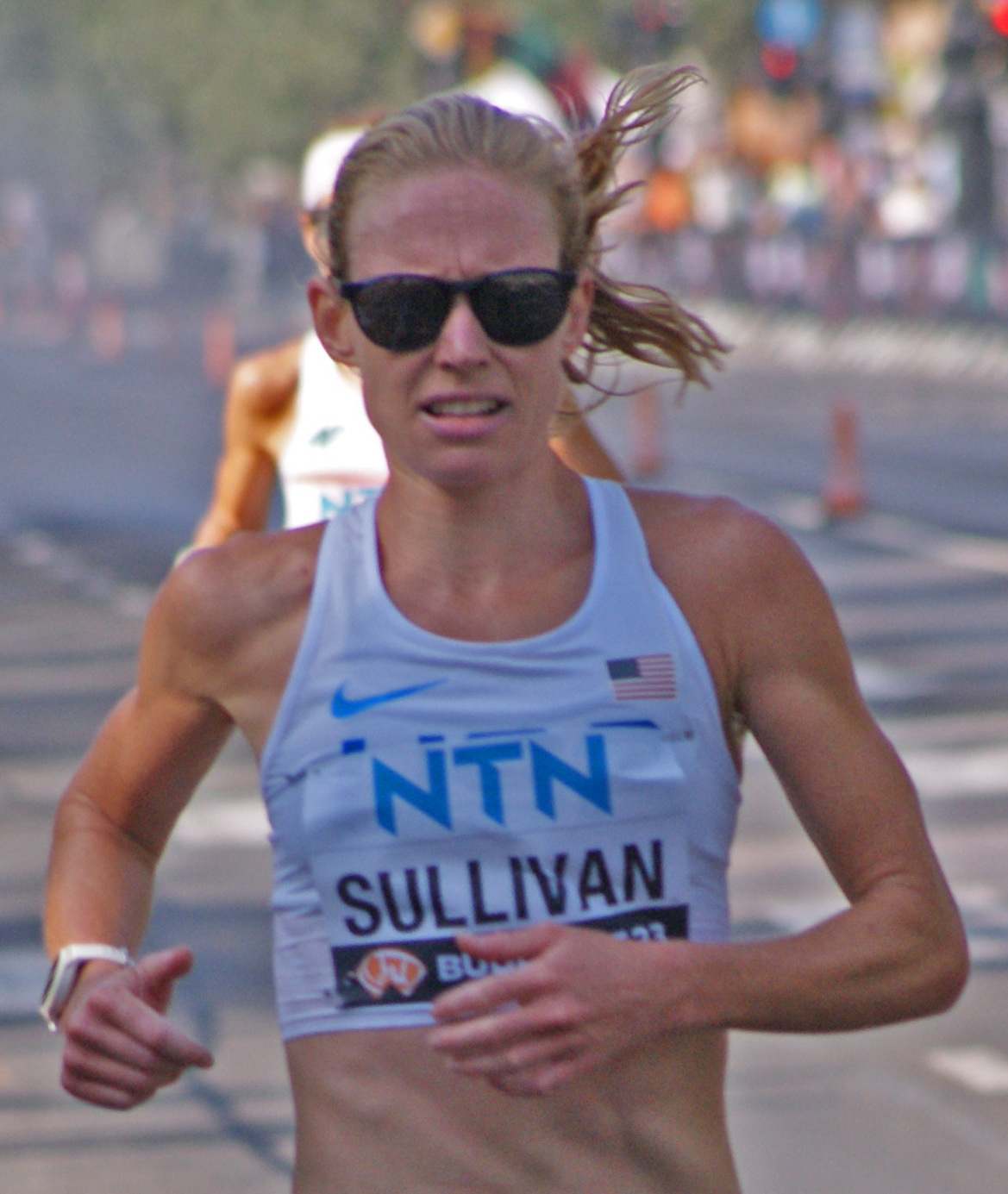
- Sullivan at the 2023 World Championships

Personal information
- Nationality: United States
- Born: May 13, 1990 (age 36) West Palm Beach, Florida
- Occupation: Middle-school math teacher
- Height: 1.65 m (5 ft 5 in)

Sport
- Sport: Track and field · Road running · Cross country running
- Event: 5000 metres · 10,000 metres · Marathon
- College team: University of Notre Dame
- Club: Brooks Sports (2023–present)

Susanna Sullivan (born May 13, 1990) is an American distance runner and teacher based in Northern Virginia. A multiple-time World Marathon Majors top-10 finisher, she placed sixth at the 2022 Chicago Marathon, 10th at the 2023 London Marathon, seventh at the 2024 Chicago Marathon, and 10th at the 2025 London Marathon. She has represented the United States at the World Athletics Championships twice, finishing 58th in 2023 and fourth in 2025. Her personal best of 2:21:56, set at the 2024 Chicago Marathon, ranks her as the 10th-fastest American woman of all time in the marathon.

== High school ==
Sullivan competed for George Mason High School (now Meridian High) in Falls Church, Virginia. In cross country she earned multiple All-State honors, placing 3rd at the Virginia state championships as a sophomore and junior, and 2nd as a senior. On the track, she won state titles in the 1600 meters and 3200 meters in 2007.

== Collegiate career ==
At the University of Notre Dame, Sullivan competed in cross country and track, earning varsity letters but never an all-conference selection. She has described her collegiate career as “lackluster” and “completely unspectacular,” citing fatigue and recurring injuries.

== Post-collegiate career ==
=== 2012–2020 ===
Sullivan joined Capital Area Runners after graduating in 2012. She debuted in the marathon at Grandma's Marathon in 2015, finishing 9th in 2:35:37 to qualify for the 2016 U.S. Olympic Trials Marathon, where she placed 20th in 2:41:18.

In 2017 she sustained a hamstring injury in a car accident, which sidelined her for an extended period. She returned to the marathon at the Richmond Marathon in 2019, where she ran 2:42:35 — at that point the slowest marathon of her career — but the result nonetheless met the qualifying standard for the 2020 Olympic Trials. At the Trials in Atlanta, she placed 145th in 2:45:57.

=== 2020–present ===
Following the 2020 Olympic Trials, Sullivan began training under Andrew Gerard, Director of Track & Field and Cross Country at George Mason University. Later that year she competed at The Marathon Project in Arizona, finishing 20th in 2:33:27.

In 2021 she placed 15th at the 2021 Boston Marathon in 2:33:22, finishing as the fourth American woman.

In 2022 she won the Cherry Blossom Ten Mile Run (52:32), becoming the first local runner to win the women’s title since 1983, placed third at Grandma’s Marathon (2:26:56), and finished sixth at the 2022 Chicago Marathon (2:25:14), her first top-10 at a World Marathon Major.

At the January 2023 USA Cross Country Championships, Sullivan finished eighth in the senior women’s 10 km, which placed her as an alternate for the World Cross Country Championships in Bathurst, Australia.

In April 2023 she placed 10th and was top American at the 2023 London Marathon in 2:24:27. Shortly afterward, she announced her first professional contract with Brooks.

At the 2023 World Athletics Championships in Budapest, she finished 58th after competing with a fractured kneecap that worsened during the race. Owing to ongoing recovery from that injury—and a COVID-19 infection the week of the race—she withdrew from the 2024 U.S. Olympic Trials Marathon in Orlando.

In October 2024, Sullivan ran a lifetime best of 2:21:56 at the 2024 Chicago Marathon, finishing seventh overall and first American.

In 2025, she was again the top American at the 2025 London Marathon (10th, 2:29:30). In September, she placed fourth at the 2025 World Athletics Championships marathon in Tokyo (2:28:17); this performance marked the highest finish by an American woman in the event since Amy Cragg won bronze in 2017. She concluded the year at the New York City Marathon in November, finishing 11th in 2:28:34. At the conclusion of the 2025 season, she was ranked No. 2 in the U.S. in the marathon by Track & Field News.

Sullivan opened her 2026 season at the Houston Half Marathon on January 11, running a personal best of 1:08:44 to finish 12th.

== Personal life ==
Outside competition, Sullivan teaches sixth-grade math at The Langley School in McLean, Virginia. She also serves as an assistant coach for the track and field and cross country programs at George Mason University. She resides in Reston, Virginia.

== Personal bests ==
Event	Performance	Venue	Date
5000 m	15:25.94	Boston, USA	Feb 10, 2023
5 km (road)	15:36	New York City, USA	Nov 2, 2024
10,000 m	31:55.80	San Juan Capistrano, USA	Mar 4, 2023
10 km (road)	32:18	New York City, USA	Jun 8, 2024
15 km	49:48	Utica, USA	Jul 10, 2022
10 Miles	52:32	Washington D.C., USA	Apr 3, 2022
Half marathon	1:08:44	Houston, USA	Jan 11, 2026
Marathon	2:21:56	Chicago, USA	Oct 13, 2024

== Major competition results ==
=== Marathons ===
Date	Race	Location	Time	Place	Notes
Jun 20, 2015	Grandma's Marathon	Duluth, Minnesota	2:35:37	9th	Debut
Feb 13, 2016	U.S. Olympic Trials	Los Angeles, California	2:41:18	20th	
Nov 16, 2019	Richmond Marathon	Richmond, Virginia	2:42:35	5th	
Feb 29, 2020	U.S. Olympic Trials	Atlanta, Georgia	2:45:57	145th	
Dec 20, 2020	The Marathon Project	Chandler, Arizona	2:33:27	20th	
Oct 11, 2021	2021 Boston Marathon	Boston, Massachusetts	2:33:22	15th	4th American
Jun 18, 2022	Grandma's Marathon	Duluth, Minnesota	2:26:56	3rd	
Oct 9, 2022	2022 Chicago Marathon	Chicago, Illinois	2:25:14	6th	First WMM top-10; 15th-fastest American all-time (as of Oct 2022)
Apr 23, 2023	2023 London Marathon	London, England	2:24:27	10th	Top American
Aug 26, 2023	2023 World Athletics Championships	Budapest, Hungary	2:44:24	58th	
Oct 13, 2024	2024 Chicago Marathon	Chicago, Illinois	2:21:56	7th	PB; Top American; 10th-fastest American woman all-time
Apr 27, 2025	2025 London Marathon	London, England	2:29:30	10th	Top American
Sep 14, 2025	2025 World Athletics Championships	Tokyo, Japan	2:28:17	4th	Top American; Best U.S. finish since 2017
Nov 2, 2025	New York City Marathon	New York, New York	2:28:34	11th	5th American

=== Road races (selected) ===
Date	Race	Location	Time	Place	Notes
Apr 3, 2022	Cherry Blossom Ten Mile Run	Washington, D.C.	52:32	1st	First local winner since 1983; PB
Jul 10, 2022	Utica Boilermaker 15K	Utica, New York	49:48	6th	PB
Jun 8, 2024	New York Mini 10K	New York, New York	32:18	12th	PB
Aug 3, 2024	Beach to Beacon 10K	Cape Elizabeth, Maine	32:22	3rd	
Sep 15, 2024	Philadelphia Distance Run (Half Marathon)	Philadelphia, Pennsylvania	1:09:42	1st	
Nov 2, 2024	Abbott Dash to the Finish Line 5K	New York, New York	15:36	5th	PB; USATF Championships
Jan 11, 2026	Houston Half Marathon	Houston, Texas	1:08:44	12th	PB

=== Track (selected) ===
Date	Meet	Event	Location	Time	Place	Notes
May 27, 2022	USATF Championships	10,000 m	Eugene, Oregon	32:12.77	17th	
Feb 10, 2023	Boston University Valentine Invitational	5000 m	Boston, Massachusetts	15:25.94	—	Personal best
Mar 4, 2023	Sound Running – The TEN	10,000 m	San Juan Capistrano, California	31:55.80	9th	Personal best
Jun 29, 2024	U.S. Olympic Trials	10,000 m	Eugene, Oregon	32:43.58	19th	
