= Sara Hall =

American runner (born 1983)

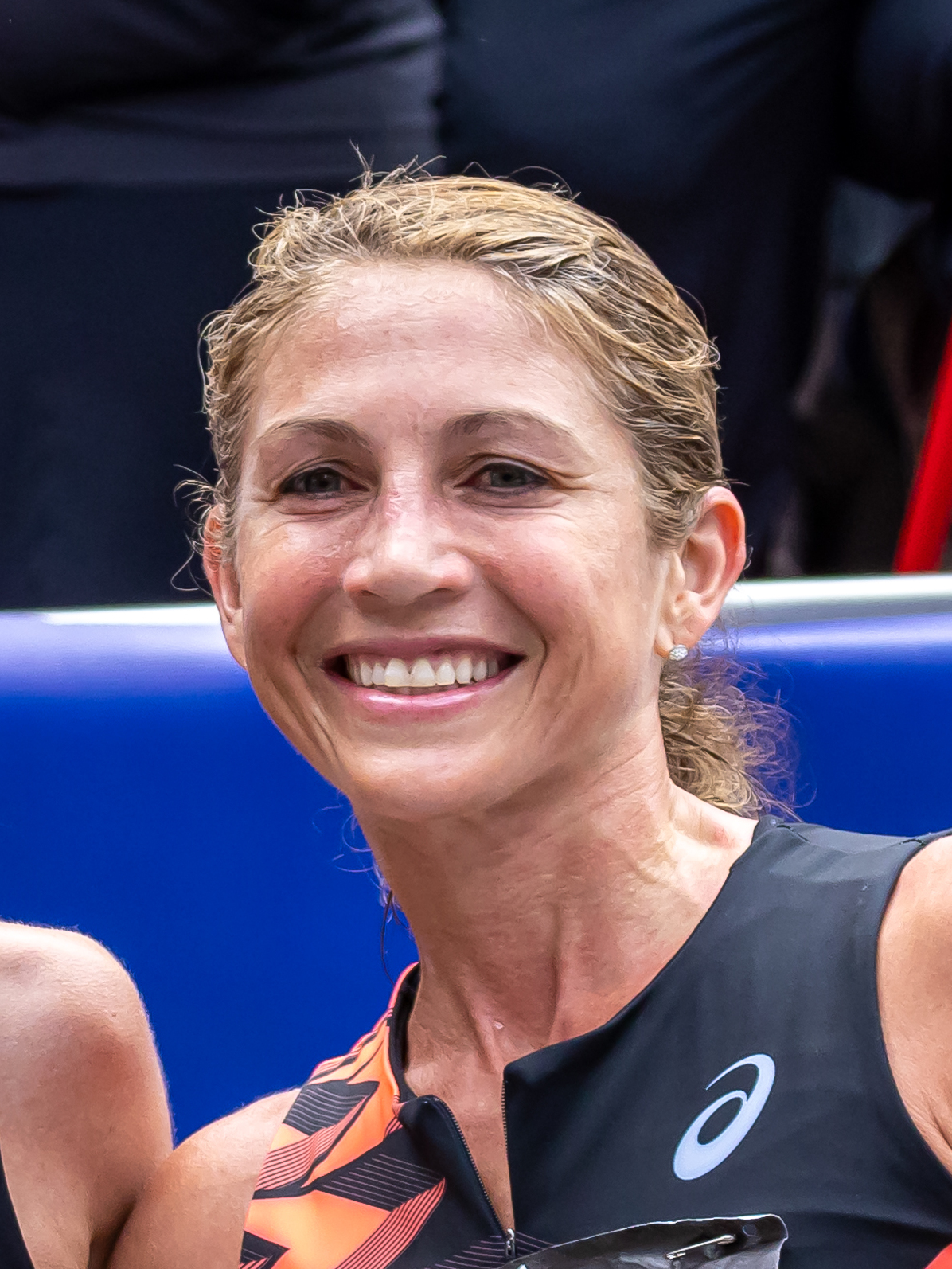
- Hall after competing in the 2024 Boston Marathon

Personal information
- Nationality: American
- Born: April 15, 1983 (age 43) Santa Rosa, California, U.S.
- Agent: Josh Cox
- Height: 5 ft 4 in (163 cm)

Sport
- Country: United States
- Sport: Women's athletics
- Club: Asics
- Team: formerly Stanford Cardinal
- Turned pro: 2005
- Coached by: Ryan Hall

Achievements and titles
- Personal bests: 1500 m: 4:08.55 (Heusden-Zolder 2008); Mile: 4:31.50i (New York 2010); 3000 m: 8:52.35 (Villeneuve-d'Ascq 2010); 5000 m: 15:20.88 (Naimette-Xhovémont 2006); 10000 m: 31:21.90 (Irvine 2021); 3000 m steeple 9:39.48 (Rome 2011); Half marathon: 1:07:15 (Houston 2022); Marathon: 2:20:32 (Chandler 2020)
Medal record
Women's athletics
Representing the United States
Pan American Games
Gold medal – first place	2011 Guadalajara	3000 m s'chase
World Marathon Majors
Silver medal – second place	2020 London	Marathon
Bronze medal – third place	2021 Chicago	Marathon

Sara Hall (née Bei; born April 15, 1983) is an American professional distance runner for ASICS. Hall's personal best time for the marathon is 2:20:32 set at the Marathon Project in Chandler, Arizona on December 22, 2020, making her the fourth-fastest American woman in history.

Hall has won several mile road races including the Drake Relays Grand Blue Mile and the US National Road Mile Championships. She also has won 1500 meter titles including one at the Millrose Games. She has also won U.S road titles at longer distances, including the 2017 national marathon chamionship. She is a two time world team member for the United States at the world indoor track and field championships. Her best finish came in 2006 when she finished 12th in the finals of the 3000 meters at the 11th IAAF World Indoor championships. She was also a member of the 2006 and 2015 United States world cross country championship team.

Hall won the 2012 American title at the USA Cross Country Championships, edging Molly Huddle at the line.

== Early life ==
Hall was born in Santa Rosa, California and competed for Montgomery High School, and was the first California athlete ever to win four state cross country titles. At the CIF California State Meet, she also earned three state track titles in the 1600 and 3200 meters and won the Footlocker National High School Cross Country Championships in 2000.

== College ==
Hall was a three-time NCAA track and field runner-up in the 5000 meters and indoor 3000 meters, and a 7-time All-American, competing for Stanford University. In 2003, she finished 3rd at the NCAA Women's Cross Country Championship, leading Stanford to a team title. As a college athlete, she competed in the finals of the United States Olympic trials in the 5000 meters.

== Career ==
2015

On March 15, 2015, Hall made her marathon debut at the Los Angeles Marathon and battled through cramps, finishing 22nd with a time of 2:48:02 (6:25 minutes/mile).

On March 28, 2015, Hall led the USA Team with 20th place 2015 IAAF World Cross Country Championships – Senior women's race after placing 5th at the 2015 USA Cross Country Championships in Boulder.

Hall finished 10th at 2015 Chicago marathon in 2:31:14, running an Olympic Standard time.

2016

Hall improved her marathon best with 2:30:06 on April 24, 2016, finishing 12th at the 2016 London Marathon.

2017

On February 26, 2017, Hall again improved her marathon best with a 2:28:26 sixth-place performance at the 2017 Tokyo Marathon.

On October 1, 2017, Hall won the Women's US 10-mile road championship in the Twin Cities, in 53:43, 2 seconds ahead of Natosha Rogers. She narrowly lost the equalizer competition male winner Shadrack Kipchirchir. Still, later, it was discovered the women were supposed to be given a 6:18 lead while they were given 6:10, so both runners were given the $10,000.

On October 29, 2017, Hall again improved her marathon best with a 2:27:21 fifth-place performance at the 2017 Mainova Frankfurt Marathon.

On December 3, 2017, Hall won the Women's U.S. Marathon in California at 2017 California International Marathon in 2:28:10.

2018

On May 27, Hall was third in the 2018 Ottawa Marathon in 2:26:19.

In July 2018, she placed 3rd at the Women's US 10 km road championship at the Peachtree 10K in 32:41.

On September 3, 2018, she won the Women's US 20 km road championship at Faxon Law New Haven Road Race 20 km in New Haven, Connecticut in 1:09:04.

On October 7, 2018, Hall won the Women's US 10-mile road championship in the Twin Cities in 52:47, repeating her 2017 victory and edging out Molly Huddle by 1 second.

2019

On September 29, 2019, Hall finished fifth in the Berlin Marathon, finishing in a personal best time of 2:22:16.

Just one week later, on October 6, 2019, she won the USATF 10-mile championships for the third time in a row in a time of 53:11.

2020

On October 4, 2020, Hall finished 2nd in 2:22:01 at the 2020 London Marathon behind Brigid Kosgei.

On December 20, 2020, Hall finished first at the Marathon Project in a personal best 2:20:32 in Chandler, Arizona, running with male pacers with the goal of breaking the US record, missing Deena Kastor's 2:19:36 record by just under one minute.

2021

On October 10, 2021, Hall finished third at the Chicago Marathon with a time of 2:27:19.

2022

On January 16, 2022, Hall broke the American record in the half marathon at the Houston Half Marathon, finishing in 1:07:15 to lower the previous American record set by Molly Huddle in 2018 by ten seconds.

On March 6, 2022, Hall finished eighth at the 2021 Tokyo Marathon with a time of 2:22:56.

On July 18, 2022, Hall finished fifth at 2022 World Athletics Championships in the marathon with a time of 2:22:10.

2023

On April 17, 2023, Hall finished seventeenth at the 2023 Boston Marathon with a record master's time of 2:25:48 (2 days after her 40th birthday.).

2024

On February 3, 2024, Hall finished fifth at the 2024 United States Olympic trials (marathon) with an American master's record time of 2:26:06.

On April 15, 2024, Hall ran the 2024 Boston Marathon, finishing in 2:27:58 the second American woman finisher, and 15th overall.

On December 1, 2024, Hall ran the 2024 Valencia Marathon, finishing in 2:23:45, with a 10th overall finish, breaking her own American master’s record set earlier in the year.

2025

On April 21, 2025, Hall ran the 2025 Boston Marathon, finishing in 2:26:32 for 18th overall.

On December 7, 2025, Hall ran the California International Marathon in 2:24:38 finishing second.

2026

On January 11, 2026 Hall finished second in the Houston Marathon with a time of 2:26:26.

On April 2026, Hall published a memoir "For The Love Of The Grind", through St. Martin's Press. The book debuted at number 9 on The New York Times Best Seller list for hardcover nonfiction and number 14 on the combined print and e-book nonfiction list for the week of May 10, 2026.

== Personal life ==
Hall has been married to U.S. Olympic marathoner Ryan Hall since 2005. The two met at Stanford, where they both competed collegiately. In 2009, they formed the Hall Steps Foundation to empower the running community to use the energy and resources that fuel runners' athletic achievements for social justice efforts. Both are committed Christians. The couple adopted four sisters in 2015.

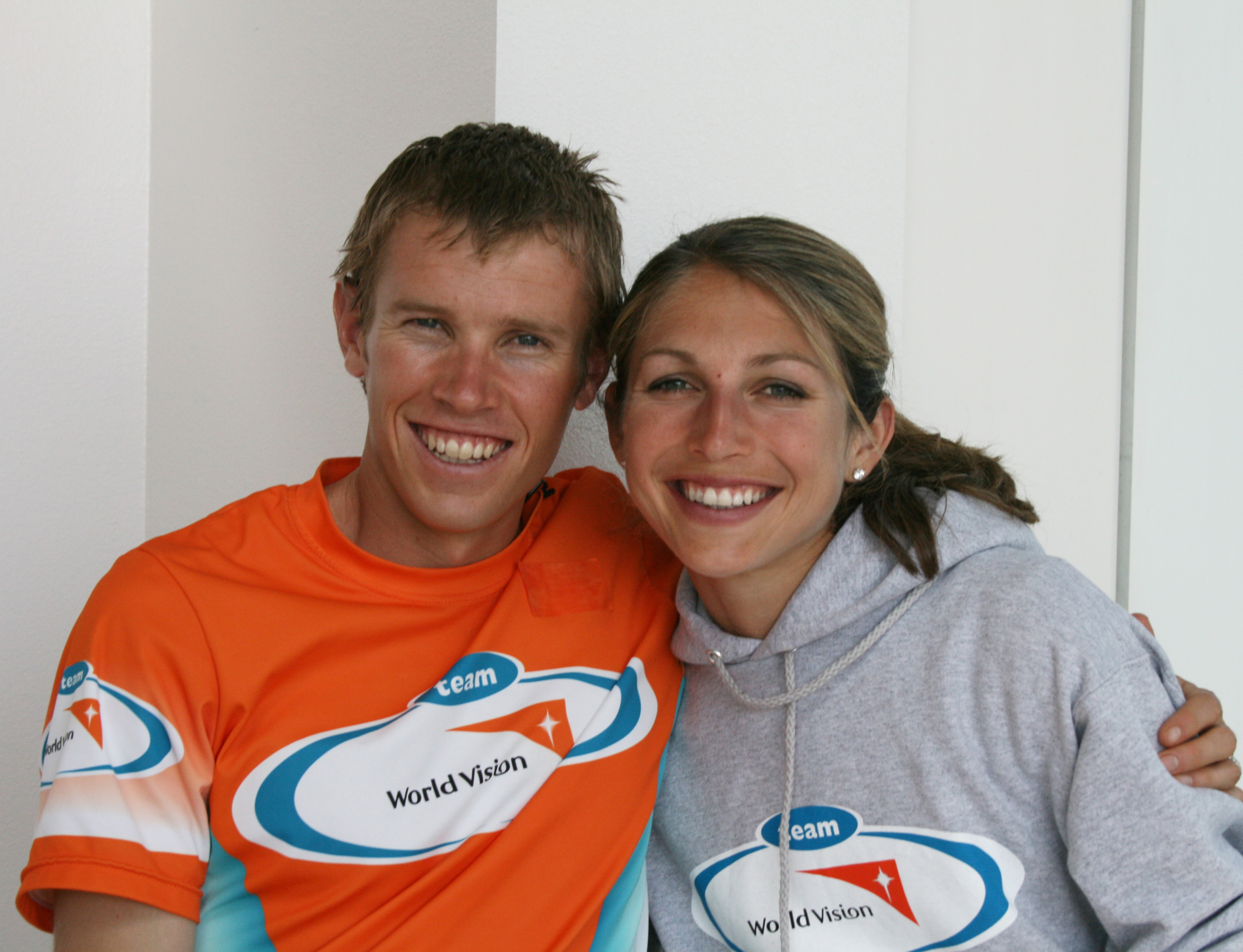
Ryan and Hall in 2008
