= Titus Kipruto =

Kenyan long-distance runner

Personal information
- Nationality: Kenyan
- Born: 25 June 1998 (age 28) Kenya
- Occupation: long-distance runner
- Years active: 2022–present

Sport
- Country: Kenya
- Sport: Athletics
- Event: Marathon

Achievements and titles
- Personal best: Marathon: 2:04:54 (2022)

Titus Kipruto (born 25 June 1998) is a Kenyan long-distance runner specializing in the marathon. He has achieved significant results in major international races, including wins and top-four finishes at World Marathon Majors.

== Career ==
In 2022, Kipruto won the Milan Marathon on April 3, 2022, with a time of 2:05:05. Later that year, he achieved his current personal best in the marathon, clocking 2:04:54 at the TCS Amsterdam Marathon on October 16, 2022, where he finished second.

In 2023, Kipruto made his World Marathon Major debut at the Tokyo Marathon, finishing in fourth place with a time of 2:05:32, marking him as the top-ranking Kenyan male athlete in that edition. He also competed in the marathon at the 2023 World Athletics Championships in Budapest, where he finished 24th with a time of 2:13:59, attributing his performance to the challenging heat and humidity.

In 2024, he finished 10th at the Paris Marathon with a time of 2:07:44. Later that year, he placed second at the Shanghai Marathon in December with a time of 2:06:30. Kipruto returned to the Tokyo Marathon in 2025, placing fourth again with a time of 2:05:34.

== Personal bests ==
- Marathon: 2:04:54 (Amsterdam, 16 October 2022)

== Achievements ==
Year	Race	City	Position	Time
2022	Milan Marathon	Milan	1st	2:05:05
2022	TCS Amsterdam Marathon	Amsterdam	2nd	2:04:54 (PB)
2023	Tokyo Marathon	Tokyo	4th	2:05:32
2023	World Athletics Championships	Budapest	24th	2:13:59
2024	Paris Marathon	Paris	10th	2:07:44
2024	Shanghai Marathon	Shanghai	2nd	2:06:30
2025	Tokyo Marathon	Tokyo	4th	2:05:34
