= Ruth Chepng'etich =

Kenyan track and field athlete

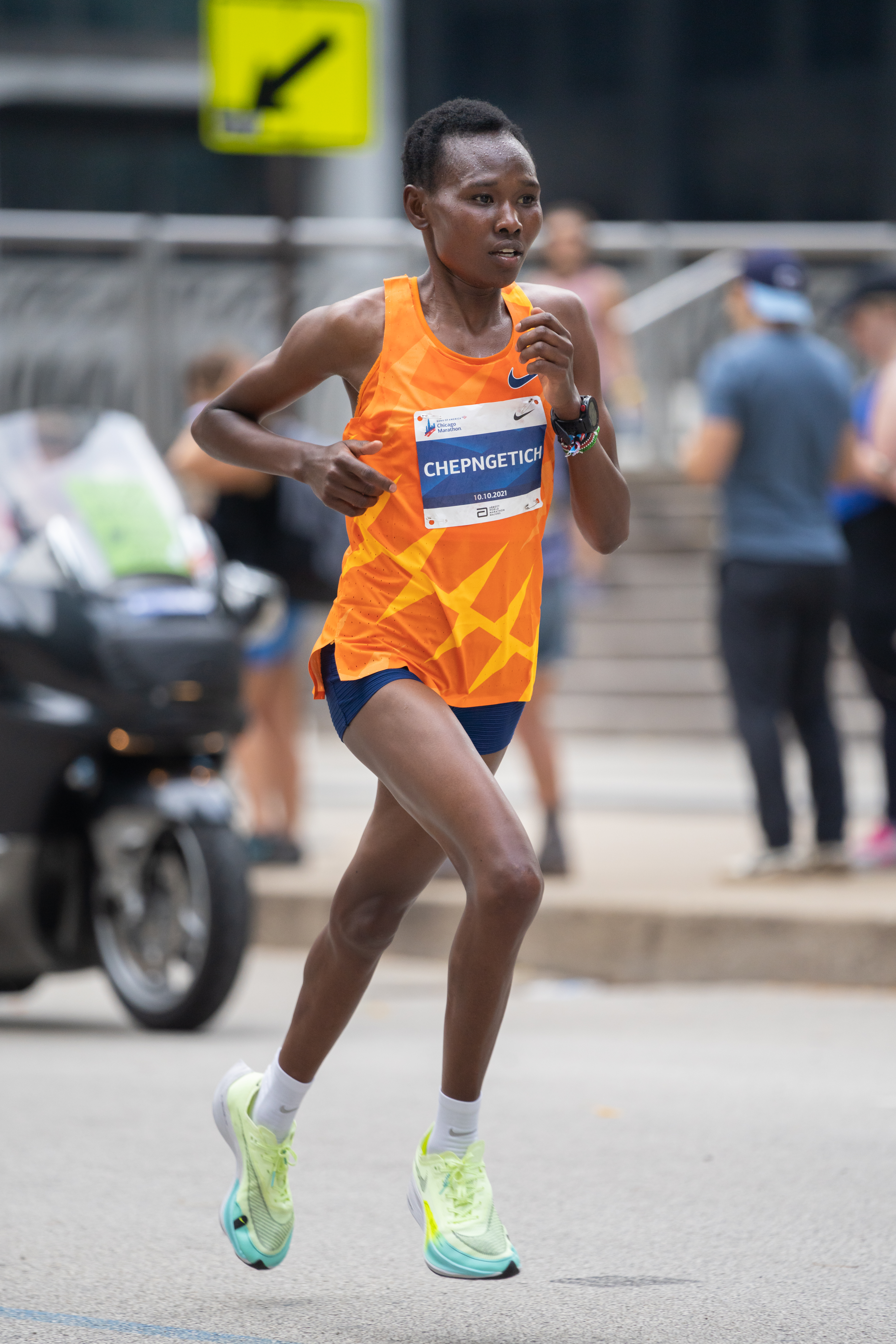
- Chepng'etich at the 2021 Chicago Marathon

Personal information
- Born: 8 August 1994 (age 32) Kericho, Rift Valley Province, Kenya
- Agent: Federico Rosa
- Height: 1.65 m (5 ft 5 in)
- Weight: 48 kg (106 lb)

Sport
- Country: Kenya
- Sport: Athletics
- Events: Half marathon, Marathon, 10 km
- Turned pro: 2016

Achievements and titles
- Personal bests: Half marathon: 1:04:02 (Istanbul 2021); Marathon: 2:09:56 Mx WR* (Chicago 2024)
Medal record
Women's athletics
Representing Kenya
World Championships
Gold medal – first place	2019 Doha	Marathon
World Half Marathon Championships
Silver medal – second place	2018 Valencia	Team
World Marathon Majors
Gold medal – first place	2021 Chicago	Marathon
Gold medal – first place	2022 Chicago	Marathon
Gold medal – first place	2024 Chicago	Marathon
Silver medal – second place	2023 Chicago	Marathon
Bronze medal – third place	2020 London	Marathon

Ruth Chepng'etich (born 8 August 1994) is a Kenyan long-distance runner. She holds the world record in the marathon with a time of 2.09:56, set at the 2024 Chicago Marathon. Chepng'etich also won a gold medal in the event at the 2019 World Athletics Championships. Her fastest half marathon time is 1.04:02, which she ran in Istanbul in April 2021.

Chepng'etich was given a three-year suspension from competition by the Athletics Integrity Unit beginning in April 2025, following a positive test for the banned substance hydrochlorothiazide, which she later admitted to using.

== Life ==
=== Early life ===
Chepng'etich was born on 8 August 1994, in Kericho, Kenya. She received her education at Sigowet Primary School and Momoniat Secondary School.

=== 2018 ===
Chepng'etich won the women's only road race at the 40th Istanbul Marathon, a World Athletics Label Road Race. She ran 2:18:35, with split times of 31:59 at 10 km, 48:15 at 15 km, 1:08:22 at the half marathon mark, and 1:37:42 at 30 km. Chepng'etich's performance was a course record, the best performance ever on Turkish soil, and, at the time, was the seventh fastest time in history. In running this time Chepng'etich became the 10th athlete in history to break the 2:19 barrier, and the 30th in history to break the 2:20 barrier.

=== 2019 ===
At the 20th Dubai Marathon, Chepng'etich set a new course record of 2 hours, 17 minutes and 8 seconds.

On 28 September, she won the world title in the marathon at the 2019 World Athletics Championships in Doha, Qatar, clocking 2:32:43 after a midnight start due to sweltering, humid conditions. The silver medal went to Rose Chelimo of Bahrain with a time of 2:33:46, and bronze went to Namibia's 39-year-old Helalia Johannes, who clocked 2:34:15. Chepng'etich's time was the slowest world championship-winning time in history for the women's marathon. Due to the unfavorable conditions, only 40 out of 68 starters finished the race in Doha.

=== 2020–2021 ===
On 4 October 2020, she finished third in the London Marathon.

On 4 April 2021, Chepng'etich set a half marathon world record of 1:04:02 at the Istanbul Half Marathon in Turkey, taking 29 seconds off the previous best set by Ababel Yeshaneh in 2020. Chepng'etich's record has since been broken, and she is currently the sixth fastest woman in history at the distance.

On 10 October 2021, she took her first victory at a World Marathon Major by winning the 2021 Chicago Marathon with a time of 2:22:31. She went out fast in a 67:34 first half, and concluded significantly slower with a 74:57 second half, but still won by nearly two minutes.

=== 2022 ===
On 13 March, Chepng'etich clocked the second fastest ever women's only marathon time to win the Nagoya Women's Marathon in Japan, a World Athletics Elite Platinum Label race. In a new course record, she ran a negative split 2:17:18 with a 69:03 first half and a 68:15 second half. At the time, this was the joint seventh-fastest time in history, which gave her an 87-second margin of victory. She won $250,000, the biggest official prize in professional running up to that point.

On 9 October, Chepng'etich successfully defended her Chicago title at the 2022 Chicago Marathon with a time of 2:14:18, a personal best by almost three minutes, then the second-fastest time in history, and just 14 seconds outside of compatriot Brigid Kosgei's then-world record of 2:14:04. Chepng'etich ran most of the race well under world record pace as she went out very fast with her first 10 miles clocked at 49:49. She ran the first half in 65:44 before running the second half much slower in 68:34. The win made her the first woman in history to break the 2:18 barrier on three occasions.

=== 2023–present: Marathon world record ===
On 13 October 2024, at the Chicago Marathon, Chepng'etich set a new world record in the marathon, with a time of 2:09:56, breaking Tigst Assefa's previous world record of 2:11:53 by almost two minutes. In setting this record, she became the first woman to run faster than 2:11 and 2:10 in the marathon. Chepng'etich stated she dedicated her world record to compatriot and men's world record holder Kelvin Kiptum, who died in February 2024.

Chepng'etich's world record was partially met with criticism and accusations of doping. Robert Johnson of LetsRun.com directly asked Chepng'etich her thoughts on the criticisms. The Kenyan National Assembly considered Johnson's question "disrespectful". Her improvement was attributed to the use of a Maurten carbohydrate mix, a special combination of sodium, carbs, and sugar, and the Nike Alphafly 3 shoe.

Following a provisional suspension, in October 2025 Chepng'etich was issued with a three-year ban backdated to April 2025 by the Athletics Integrity Unit after testing positive for hydrochlorothiazide. The standard sanction of four years was reduced by one year as she admitted the violation.

== Achievements ==
=== Personal bests ===
Distance	Performance	Location	Date	Notes
5000 metres	15:26.70	Nairobi, Kenya	9 April 2022	
10,000 metres	31:47.9	Nairobi, Kenya	26 April 2022	
10 km	30:29	Manchester, United Kingdom	22 May 2022	(also 30:57 not legal)
Half marathon	1:04:02	Istanbul, Turkey	4 April 2021	Mx NR, 6th of all time
Marathon	2:09:56	Chicago, United States	13 October 2024	Mx WR

=== International competitions ===
Year	Competition	Venue	Position	Event	Notes
10 kilometres
2018	Memorial Samuel Wanjiru 10 km	Nyahururu, Kenya	2nd	10 km	33:09
Marathons representing Kenya
2017	Istanbul Marathon	Istanbul, Turkey	1st	Marathon	2:22:36
2018	Paris Marathon	Paris, France	2nd	Marathon	2:22:59
2018	Istanbul Marathon	Istanbul, Turkey	1st	Marathon	2:18:35 CR
2019	Dubai Marathon	Dubai, United Arab Emirates	1st	Marathon	2:17:08
2019	World Championships	Doha, Qatar	1st	Marathon	2:32:43
2020	London Marathon	London, United Kingdom	3rd	Marathon	2:22:05
2021	Olympic Games	Sapporo, Japan	–	Marathon	DNF
2021	Chicago Marathon	Chicago, United States	1st	Marathon	2:22:31
2022	Nagoya Women's Marathon	Nagoya, Japan	1st	Marathon	2:17:18 CR
2022	World Championships	Eugene, United States	–	Marathon	DNF
2022	Chicago Marathon	Chicago, United States	1st	Marathon	2:14:18
2023	Nagoya Women's Marathon	Nagoya, Japan	1st	Marathon	2:18:08
2024	Chicago Marathon	Chicago, United States	1st	Marathon	2:09:57 WR
Half marathons representing Nike
2016	Rabat Half Marathon	Rabat, Morocco	4th	Half Marathon	1:11:33
2016	Nairobi Half Marathon	Nairobi, Kenya	2nd	Half Marathon	1:14:13
2017	Adana Half Marathon	Adana, Turkey	1st	Half Marathon	1:09:06
2017	Paris Half Marathon	Paris, France	1st	Half Marathon	1:08:08
2017	Milan Half Marathon	Milan, Italy	1st	Half Marathon	1:07:42
2017	Istanbul Half Marathon	Istanbul, Turkey	1st	Half Marathon	1:06:19
2017	Bogotá Half Marathon	Bogotá, Colombia	3rd	Half Marathon	1:13:57
2017	Rock 'n' Roll Half Marathon	Lisbon, Portugal	4th	Half Marathon	1:10:33
2018	World Half Marathon Championships	Valencia, Spain	13th	Half Marathon	1:09:12
2018	Copenhagen Half Marathon	Copenhagen, Denmark	5th	Half Marathon	1:07:02
2019	Bahrain Night Half Marathon	Manama, Bahrain	2nd	Half Marathon	1:06:09
2019	Vodafone Istanbul Half Marathon	Istanbul, Turkey	1st	Half Marathon	1:05:30 CR
2019	Gifu Seiryu Half Marathon	Gifu, Japan	1st	Half Marathon	1:06:06
2019	Bogotá Half Marathon	Bogotá, Colombia	1st	Half Marathon	1:10:39
2020	Airtel Delhi Half Marathon	New Delhi, India	2nd	Half marathon	1:05:06
2021	Istanbul Half Marathon	Istanbul, Turkey	1st	Half marathon	1:04:02 WR

=== National championships ===
- Kenyan Athletics Championships
  - 10,000 metres: 2022
- Kenyan Cross Country Championships
  - Senior women's race: 2023

Records
Preceded by (Ethiopia) Ababel Yeshaneh	Women's Half marathon World record holder 4 April 2021 – 24 October 2021	Succeeded by (Ethiopia) Letesenbet Gidey
