= John Korir (runner, born 1996) =

Kenyan long-distance runner (born 1996)

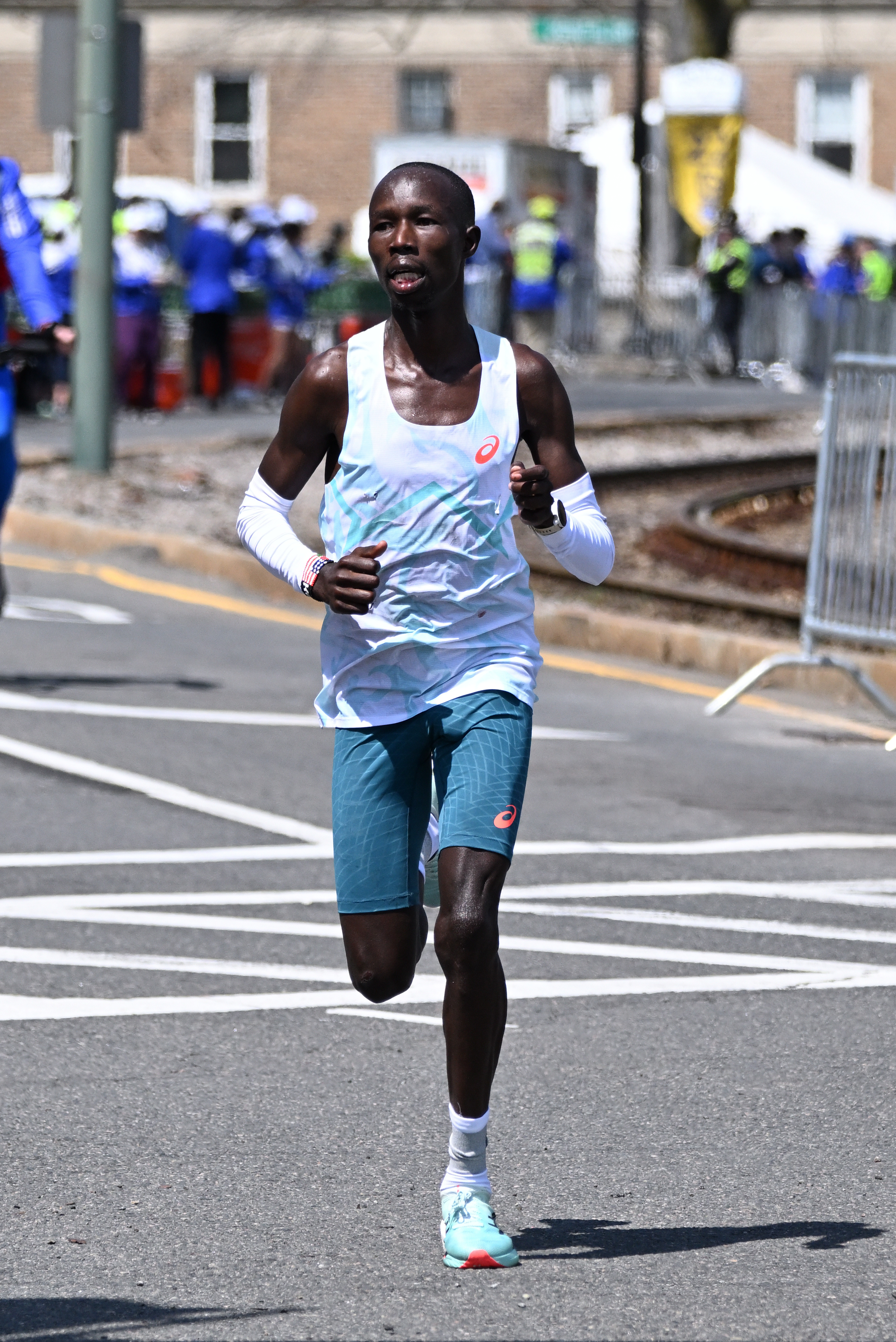
- Korir running the 2025 Boston Marathon

Personal information
- Born: 2 December 1996 (age 29) Kitale, Kenya

Achievements and titles
- Personal bests: All per World Athletics profile.: Half marathon: 58:50 (Ras Al Khaimah 2024); Marathon: 2:01:52 (Boston 2026)
Medal record
World Marathon Majors
Gold medal – first place	2024 Chicago	Marathon
Gold medal – first place	2025 Boston	Marathon
Gold medal – first place	2026 Boston	Marathon
Bronze medal – third place	2022 Chicago	Marathon

John Korir (born 2 December 1996) is a Kenyan road runner who specializes in the half marathon and marathon distances. He was the winner of the 2024 Chicago Marathon, in a time of 2:02:44, making him the sixth fastest marathoner in history. He won the 2025 Boston Marathon in a time of 2:04:45, and the 2026 Boston Marathon in a time of 2:01:52, setting the course record. His brother Wesley Korir won the 2012 Boston Marathon, making them the first brothers to win Boston.

== Road running ==
Year	Road Race	Location	Rank	Time
2018	Ottawa Marathon	Ottawa	2nd	2:09:14
2019	Los Angeles Marathon	Los Angeles	2nd	2:11:53
2019	Frankfurt Marathon	Frankfurt	12th	2:13:09
2021	Los Angeles Marathon	Los Angeles	1st	2:12:49
2022	Los Angeles Marathon	Los Angeles	1st	2:09:08
2022	Chicago Marathon	Chicago	3rd	2:05:01
2023	Boston Marathon	Boston	9th	2:10:04
2023	Chicago Marathon	Chicago	4th	2:05:09
2024	Boston Marathon	Boston	4th	2:07:40
2024	Chicago Marathon	Chicago	1st	2:02:44
2025	Boston Marathon	Boston	1st	2:04:45
2025	Chicago Marathon	Chicago	DNF	
2025	Valencia Marathon	Valencia	1st	2:02:24
2026	Boston Marathon	Boston	1st	2:01:52 CR

== World Marathon Majors Record ==
World Marathon Majors	2022	2023	2024	2025	2026
Tokyo Marathon	-	-	-	-	-
Boston Marathon	-	9th	-	1st	1st
London Marathon	-	-	-	-	-
Berlin Marathon	-	-	-	-	-
Chicago Marathon	3rd	4th	1st	DNF	-
New York City Marathon	-	-	-	-	-
