= Seifu Tura =

Ethiopian long-distance runner

Seifu Tura Abdiwak
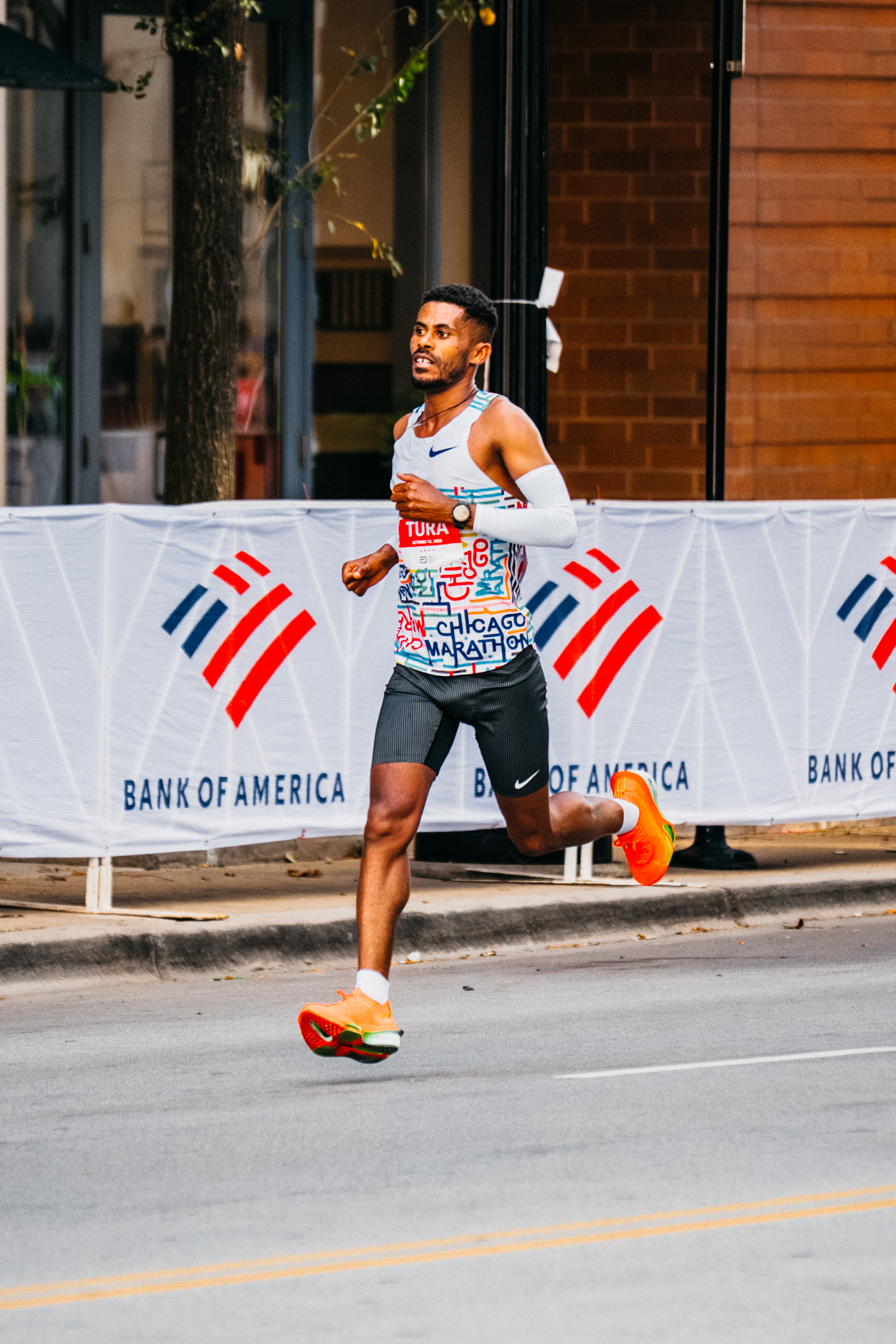
- Tura at mile 25 of the 2025 Chicago Marathon

Personal information
- Nationality: Ethiopian
- Born: 19 June 1997 (age 29)

Sport
- Country: Ethiopia
- Sport: Athletics
- Event(s): Half marathon, Marathon

Achievements and titles
- Personal best: Marathon: 2:04:29 (Milan 2021)
Medal record
Men's athletics
Representing Ethiopia
World Marathon Majors
Gold medal – first place	2021 Chicago	Marathon
Silver medal – second place	2022 Chicago	Marathon

Seifu Tura Abdiwak (Note: Tura's name has also been spelt as "Seyefu Tura".) (born 19 June 1997) is an Ethiopian long-distance runner. He won the 2021 Chicago Marathon and placed second at the 2022 Chicago Marathon.

== Career ==
Seifu Tura originally specialized in middle-distance running, having won the 3000 m event of the 2015 Janusz Kusociński Memorial in Szczecin, Poland, with a time of 7:56.22.

In 2017, he debuted over the marathon distance at the JoongAng Seoul Marathon, taking second place with a time of 2:09:26.

After achieving a time of 2:04:44 at the 2018 Dubai Marathon, Tura won the 2018 Milano Marathon with a time of 2:09:04, despite having an issue with cramps. It was the runner's third attempt at the distance, six months after the first. Later that year, Tura also won the Shanghai Marathon, with a time of 2:09:18, a split second ahead of compatriot Tsegaye Mekonnen. This also marked the first time both winners of the Shanghai Marathon were from Ethiopia, as Yebrgual Melese had also won the race, setting a course record in the process.

In 2021, Tura set a marathon personal best of 2:04:29 with a fourth-place finish in Milano. Months later, he won the 2021 Chicago Marathon with a time of 2:06:12.

The following year in July, Tura placed sixth in the marathon at the 2022 World Championships in Eugene, Oregon with a time of 2:07:17. He finished second at the 2022 Chicago Marathon in October in 2:04:49.

== Personal bests ==
- 3000 metres – 7:52.04 (Madrid 2015)
- 5000 metres – 13:27.70 (Barcelona 2015)
- 10 kilometres – 29:05 (Addis Ababa 2016)
- Half marathon – 58:36 (Ras Al Khaimah 2022)
- Marathon – 2:04:29 (Milan 2021)
