= Waganesh Mekasha Amare =

Ethiopian long-distance runner

Waganesh Mekasha
Personal information
- Nationality: Ethiopian
- Born: Waganesh Mekasha Amare; 16 January 1992 (age 34) Ethiopia
- Occupation: long-distance runner
- Years active: 2014–present

Sport
- Country: Ethiopia
- Sport: Athletics
- Event(s): Marathon, 10K Road

Achievements and titles
- Personal bests: Marathon: 2:22:45 (2019); 10 Kilometres Road: 32:20 (2021)

Waganesh Mekasha Amare (born 16 January 1992) is an Ethiopian long-distance runner who competes internationally in marathon and road running events. She set her personal best of 2:20:26 at the 2025 Toronto Waterfront Marathon. Mekasha has won several World Athletics Label races, including the 2024 Osaka Marathon and 2023 Ottawa Marathon, and placed fifth at the prestigious 2022 Chicago Marathon, part of the World Marathon Majors series.

== Career ==
Waganesh Mekasha has been a consistent performer in international marathons since 2014. She achieved her personal best time of 2:22:45 at the 2019 Dubai Marathon, finishing fourth.

In 2018, she won both the Padova Marathon in 2:29:18 and the Hengshui Lake Marathon. The following year, she placed second at the Dongying Marathon and the Shanghai International Marathon after her strong Dubai result.

In 2022, Mekasha finished fifth at the 2022 Chicago Marathon, a World Marathon Major, with a time of 2:23:41.

In 2023, Mekasha won the Ottawa Marathon in 2:24:48, and later that year took second at the TCS Toronto Waterfront Marathon with 2:23:11.

In 2024, she claimed victory at the Osaka Marathon with a time of 2:26:33.

== Achievements ==
Year	Race	Location	Position	Time
2018	Padova Marathon	Padua	1st	2:29:18
2018	Hengshui Lake Marathon	Hengshui	1st	2:29:00 (est.)
2019	Dubai Marathon	Dubai	4th	2:22:45 (PB)
2019	Dongying Marathon	Dongying	2nd	2:26:15
2019	Shanghai International Marathon	Shanghai	2nd	2:25:36
2021	Schneider Electric Marathon de Paris	Paris	4th	2:26:36
2022	Chicago Marathon	Chicago	5th	2:23:41
2023	Ottawa Marathon	Ottawa	1st	2:24:48
2023	TCS Toronto Waterfront Marathon	Toronto	2nd	2:23:11
2024	Osaka Marathon	Osaka	1st	2:26:33
