= 2022 Chicago Marathon =

26.2 mi (42.195 km) race in Illinois, U.S.

44th Chicago Marathon
- Location: Chicago, Illinois, U.S.
- Dates: October 9, 2022
- Website: chicagomarathon.com

Champions
- Men: Benson Kipruto (2:04:24)
- Women: Ruth Chepngetich (2:14:18)
- Wheelchair men: Marcel Hug (1:25:20)
- Wheelchair women: Susannah Scaroni (1:45:48)

The 2022 Chicago Marathon was the 44th edition of the annual marathon race in Chicago, held on Sunday, October 9, 2022. An Elite Platinum Label marathon, it was the third of four World Marathon Majors events to be held over the span of six weeks. (Note: In chronological order, the events are: the Berlin Marathon on September 25, 2022; the London Marathon on October 2, 2022; the Chicago Marathon on October 9, 2022; and the New York City Marathon on November 6, 2022.) More than 40,000 runners were expected to take part in the event.

== Competitors ==
Seifu Tura of Ethiopia, the winner of the previous year's race, was expected to return to defend his title. His compatriot Herpasa Negasa, who ran a marathon with a time of 2:03:40 in Dubai in 2019, was expected to join him. Also expected to make an appearance were Kenyan runners Bernard Koech and Elisha Rotich.

Kenyan runner Ruth Chepng'etich, the defending champion, was the favorite to win the women's race. Also scheduled to join the field were Ethiopian runners Ruti Aga and Haven Hailu Desse, and Kenyan runners Celestine Chepchirchir and Vivian Kiplagat.

U.S. wheelchair athlete Tatyana McFadden, who had previously won the Chicago Marathon nine times, was also expected to defend her title.

== Results ==
Results for the top ten in the running races and top three in the wheelchair races are listed below.

Men's race result
Position	Athlete	Nationality	Time
1st place, gold medalist(s)	Benson Kipruto	Kenya	2:04:24
2nd place, silver medalist(s)	Seifu Tura Abdiwak	Ethiopia	2:04:49
3rd place, bronze medalist(s)	John Korir	Kenya	2:05:01
4	Bernard Koech	Kenya	2:07:15
5	Shifera Tamru Aredo	Ethiopia	2:07:53
6	Kyohei Hosoya	Japan	2:08:05
7	Conner Mantz	United States	2:08:16
8	Hamza Sahli	Morocco	2:08:22
9	Eric Kiptanui	Kenya	2:08:26
10	Dong Guojian	China	2:08:53

Women's race result
Position	Athlete	Nationality	Time
1st place, gold medalist(s)	Ruth Chepng'etich	Kenya	2:14:18
2nd place, silver medalist(s)	Emily Sisson	United States	2:18:29
3rd place, bronze medalist(s)	Vivian Jerono Kiplagat	Kenya	2:20:52
4	Ruti Aga	Ethiopia	2:21:41
5	Waganesh Mekasha Amare	Ethiopia	2:23:41
6	Susanna Sullivan	United States	2:25:14
7	Sara Vaughn	United States	2:26:23
8	Maggie Montoya	United States	2:28:07
9	Sarah Inglis	United Kingdom	2:29:37
10	Makena Morley	United States	2:30:28

Men's wheelchair race result
Position	Athlete	Nationality	Time
1st place, gold medalist(s)	Marcel Hug	Switzerland	1:25:20
2nd place, silver medalist(s)	Daniel Romanchuk	United States	1:33:11
3rd place, bronze medalist(s)	Aaron Pike	United States	1:33:13

Women's wheelchair race result
Position	Athlete	Nationality	Time
1st place, gold medalist(s)	Susannah Scaroni	United States	1:45:48
2nd place, silver medalist(s)	Tatyana McFadden	United States	1:49:46
3rd place, bronze medalist(s)	Jenna Fesemyer	United States	1:49:52
