= 2021 Chicago Marathon =

Running race in 2021

43rd Chicago Marathon
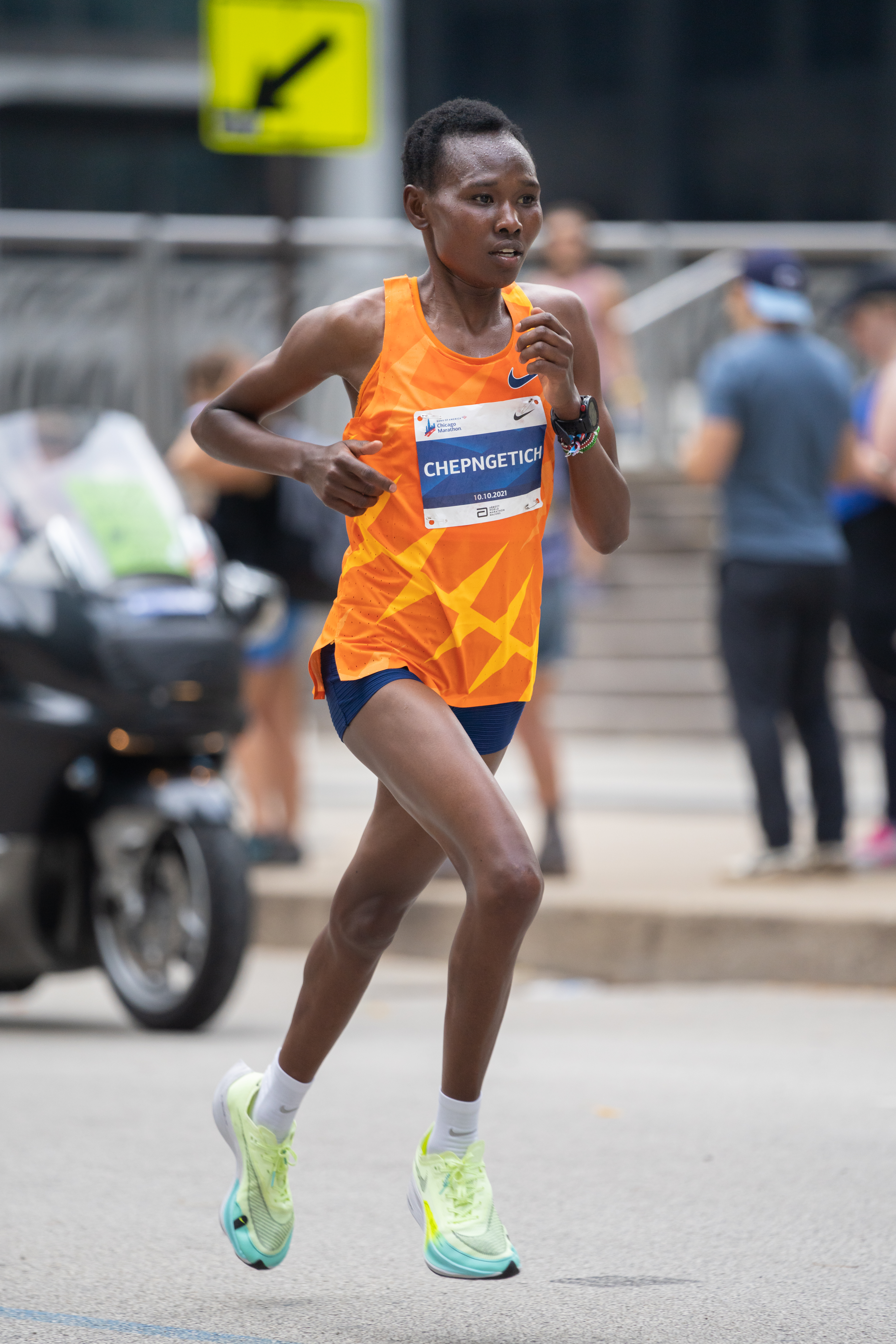
- Women's winner - Ruth Chepng'etich finished in 2:22:31
- Venue: Chicago, United States
- Dates: October 10, 2021

Champions
- Men: Seifu Tura (2:06:12)
- Women: Ruth Chepng'etich (2:22:31)
- Wheelchair men: Daniel Romanchuk (1:29:07)
- Wheelchair women: Tatyana McFadden (1:48:57)

The 2021 Chicago Marathon was held on October 10, 2021. It was the 43rd edition of the annual Chicago Marathon, and the first after the start of the COVID-19 pandemic in 2019. The 2020 Chicago Marathon was canceled as a result of the pandemic. The race was the third of five World Marathon Majors scheduled for 2021; all the events in the series took place in the span of six weeks between late September and early November.

Participants were required to provide proof of COVID-19 vaccination or a negative COVID-19 test taken within 72 hours of attending the event.

The marathon was won by Seifu Tura of Ethiopia and Ruth Chepng'etich of Kenya, in 2:06:12 and 2:22:31, respectively, while the wheelchair race was won by Daniel Romanchuk and Tatyana McFadden, both of the United States, in 1:29:07 and 1:48:57, respectively.

== Results ==
Results for the top ten in the running races and top three in the wheelchair races are listed below.

Men's race result
Position	Athlete	Nationality	Time
1st place, gold medalist(s)	Seifu Tura	Ethiopia	2:06:12
2nd place, silver medalist(s)	Galen Rupp	United States	2:06:35
3rd place, bronze medalist(s)	Eric Kiptanui	Kenya	2:06:51
4	Kengo Suzuki	Japan	2:08:50
5	Shifera Tamru	Ethiopia	2:09:39
6	Colin Mickow	United States	2:13:31
7	Nico Montanez	United States	2:13:55
8	Reuben Kipyego	Kenya	2:14:24
9	Reed Fischer	United States	2:14:41
10	Wilkerson Given	United States	2:14:55

Women's race result
Position	Athlete	Nationality	Time
1st place, gold medalist(s)	Ruth Chepngetich	Kenya	2:22:31
2nd place, silver medalist(s)	Emma Bates	United States	2:24:20
3rd place, bronze medalist(s)	Sara Hall	United States	2:27:19
4	Keira D'Amato	United States	2:28:22
5	Vivian Jerono Kiplagat	Kenya	2:29:14
6	Maegan Krifchin	United States	2:30:17
7	Carrie Verdon	United States	2:31:51
8	Sarah Pagano	United States	2:33:11
9	Meseret Belete	Ethiopia	2:33:14
10	Lindsay Flanagan	United States	2:33:20

Men's wheelchair race result
Position	Athlete	Nationality	Time
1st place, gold medalist(s)	Daniel Romanchuk	United States	1:29:07
2nd place, silver medalist(s)	Marcel Hug	Switzerland	1:29:08
3rd place, bronze medalist(s)	Aaron Pike	United States	1:29:28

Women's wheelchair race result
Position	Athlete	Nationality	Time
1st place, gold medalist(s)	Tatyana McFadden	United States	1:48:57
2nd place, silver medalist(s)	Yen Hoang	United States	1:50:14
3rd place, bronze medalist(s)	Jenna Fesemyer	United States	1:50:23
