= Marathon Project =

The Marathon Project was an elite-only marathon held on the Gila River Indian Reservation in Chandler, Arizona in December 2020. It was created by Northern Arizona Elite coach Ben Rosario together with Josh Cox and Matt Helbig to provide a race after many of the World Marathon Majors were cancelled due to COVID-19.

== Records ==
Medical student Martin Hehir finished first in a time of 2:08:59 and Sara Hall won the women's race and became the second fastest American marathoner in a race paced by Calum Neff.

Among the records set at the race, Nathan Martin became the fastest American born African-American marathoner when he finished in 2:11:05 to beat Herm Atkins' 2:11:32.
