= Vivian Jerono Kiplagat =

Kenyan long-distance runner

Personal information
- Nationality: Kenyan
- Born: Vivian Jerono Kiplagat; 9 November 1991 (age 34) Kenya
- Occupation: Long-distance runner
- Years active: 2017–present

Sport
- Country: Kenya
- Sport: Athletics
- Event(s): Marathon, Half marathon

Achievements and titles
- Personal bests: Marathon: 2:20:18 (2022); Half marathon: 1:06:07 (2021)
Medal record
Athletics
Representing Kenya
Gold medal – first place	2019 Abu Dhabi Marathon	Marathon
Gold medal – first place	2019 Milan Marathon	Marathon
Gold medal – first place	2018 Buenos Aires Marathon	Marathon
Gold medal – first place	2018 Honolulu Marathon	Marathon
Bronze medal – third place	2022 Chicago Marathon	Marathon

Vivian Jerono Kiplagat (born 9 November 1991) is a Kenyan long-distance runner who competes internationally in marathon and road running events. She has won several major marathons, including the 2019 Abu Dhabi Marathon and the 2019 Milan Marathon. Kiplagat's personal best in the marathon is 2:20:18, set at the 2022 Milan Marathon. She also finished third at the 2022 Chicago Marathon, part of the World Marathon Majors series.

== Career ==
Vivian Kiplagat began her international marathon career in 2018.

That year, she won the Buenos Aires Marathon in 2:29:03. She followed with a victory at the Honolulu Marathon, clocking 2:36:22.

In 2019, Kiplagat won the Milan Marathon in 2:22:25. She also took first place at the Abu Dhabi Marathon with a time of 2:21:11.

In 2021, Kiplagat set her half marathon personal best of 1:06:07 in Copenhagen.

In 2022, she ran her marathon personal best of 2:20:18 at the Milan Marathon. Later that year, she placed third at the 2022 Chicago Marathon in 2:20:52.

In 2020, Kiplagat competed at the 2020 London Marathon, finishing ninth. After the race, she told Kenyan media she was happy to compete in such an elite field.

In 2024, Kiplagat placed seventh at the Daegu Marathon in 2:26:59.

== Achievements ==
Year	Race	Location	Position	Time
2018	Buenos Aires Marathon	Buenos Aires	1st	2:29:03
2018	Honolulu Marathon	Honolulu	1st	2:36:22
2019	Milan Marathon	Milan	1st	2:22:25
2019	Abu Dhabi Marathon	Abu Dhabi	1st	2:21:11
2020	London Marathon	London	9th	—
2021	Chicago Marathon	Chicago	5th	2:29:14
2022	Milan Marathon	Milan	1st	2:20:18 (PB)
2022	Chicago Marathon	Chicago	3rd	2:20:52
2024	Daegu Marathon	Daegu	7th	2:26:59
