= 2025 Boston Marathon =

Footrace in Boston, Massachusetts, USA

- Location: Boston, Massachusetts, U.S.
- Date: April 21, 2025
- Total prize money: $1,137,500
- Website: https://www.baa.org/races/boston-marathon

Champions
- Men: John Korir (2:04:45)
- Women: Sharon Lokedi (2:17:22)
- Wheelchair men: Marcel Hug (1:21:34)
- Wheelchair women: Susannah Scaroni (1:35:20)

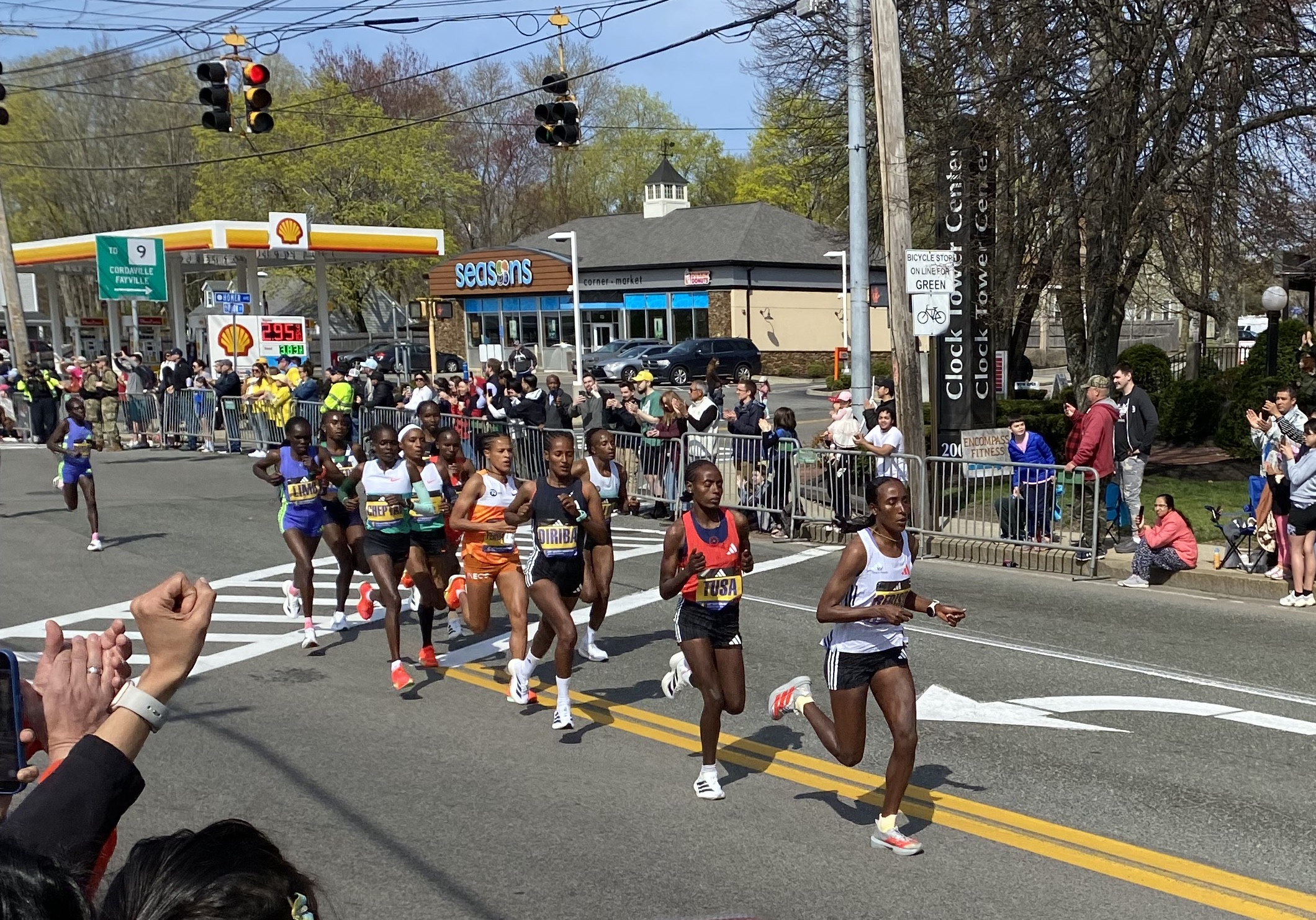
Elite women runners in Ashland during the marathon

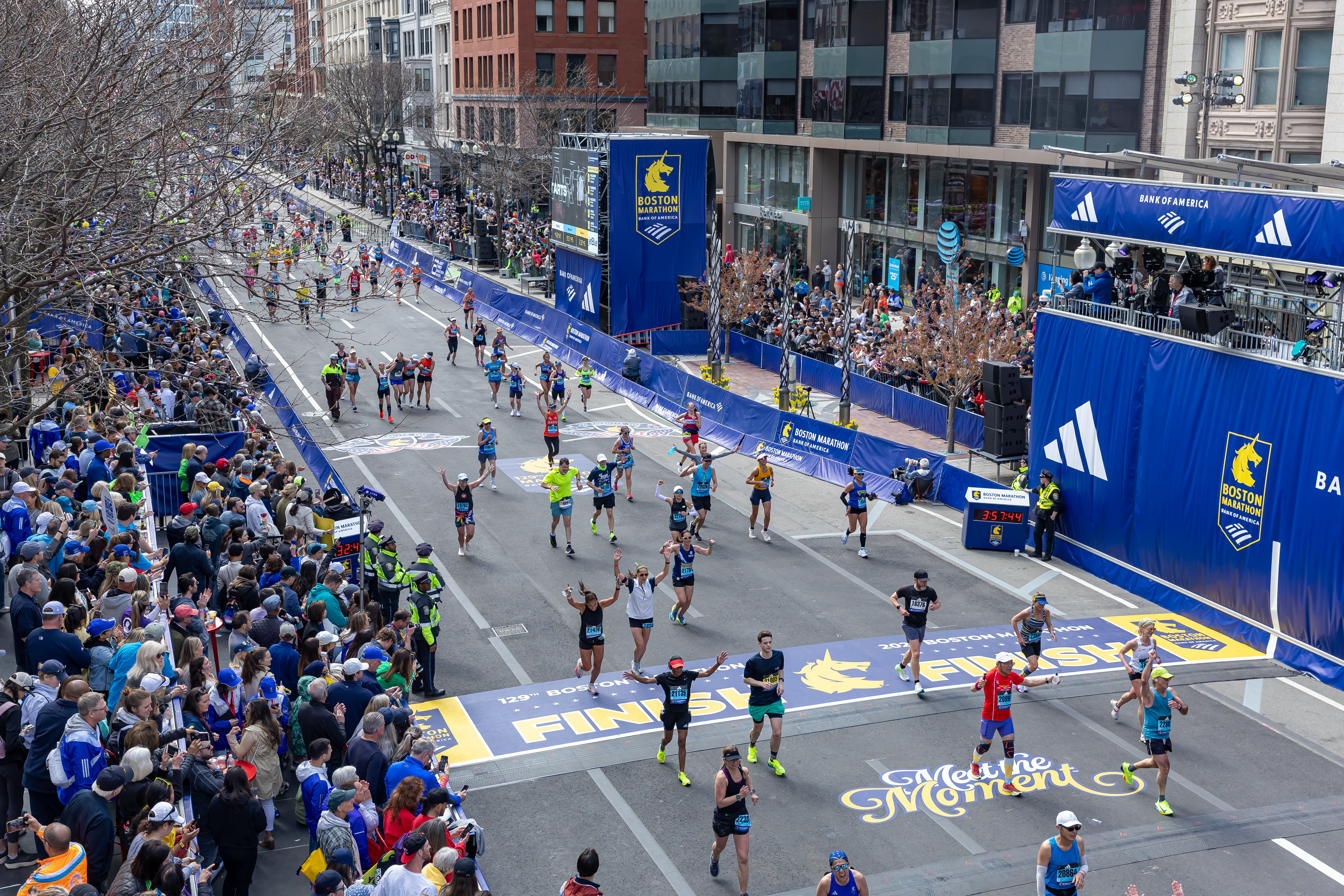
Finishing line

The 2025 Boston Marathon was the 129th official edition of the annual marathon race in Boston, Massachusetts, held on Monday, April 21, 2025. (Note: Organizers specified 5:30 p.m. (ET) as the fixed finishing time for all runners.) It was a Platinum Label marathon, one of seven World Marathon Majors (Note: The number of World Marathon Majors increased from six to seven in 2025 with the addition of the Sydney Marathon.) scheduled for 2025 and the second to be run, following the 2025 Tokyo Marathon of early March.

In early April, organizers announced that Bill Rodgers, four-time winner of the event, and Bob Hall, "the father of wheelchair racing", would serve as grand marshals. Each won their division in the 1975 Boston Marathon.

== Entrants ==
A total of 32,080 runners appeared on the official entry list (24,000 chosen based on their performances in qualifying events), an increase from the 29,685 runners on the entry list of the 2024 edition. Entrants came from all 50 U.S. states and 118 countries.

Notable professional entrants in the event included:

- Men: Sisay Lemma†, John Korir, Evans Chebet, Cyprian Kimurgor Kotut, and Haymanot Alew
- Women: Hellen Obiri†, Amane Beriso, Yalemzerf Yehualaw, Irine Cheptai, Keira D'Amato, and Rahma Tusa
- Men's wheelchair: Marcel Hug†, Johnboy Smith, Daniel Romanchuk, Kota Hokinoue, and Rafael Botello Jimenez
- Women's wheelchair: Eden Rainbow-Cooper†, Susannah Scaroni, Manuela Schar, Tatyana McFadden, and Catherine Debrunner
- Men's para-athletes: El Amin Chentouf, Wajdi Boukhili, and Richard Whitehead
- Women's para-athletes: Kelly Bruno and Melissa Stockwell

Note: a dagger (†) denotes a defending champion from the 2024 edition

Other notable entrants included:

- Amby Burfoot, American former long-distance runner, winner of the 1968 Boston Marathon and 1966 Philadelphia Marathon
- Alice Cook, American former figure skater and sports reporter
- Brian Diemer, American former track and field athlete, bronze medalist in the 3000m steeplechase at the 1984 Summer Olympics
- Matt James, American television personality (The Bachelor)
- Paula Radcliffe, British former long-distance runner, former women's marathon world record holder
- Scott Stallings, American professional golfer

Zdeno Chára, former team captain of the Boston Bruins, was listed as an entrant but did not run.

== Results ==
=== Open ===
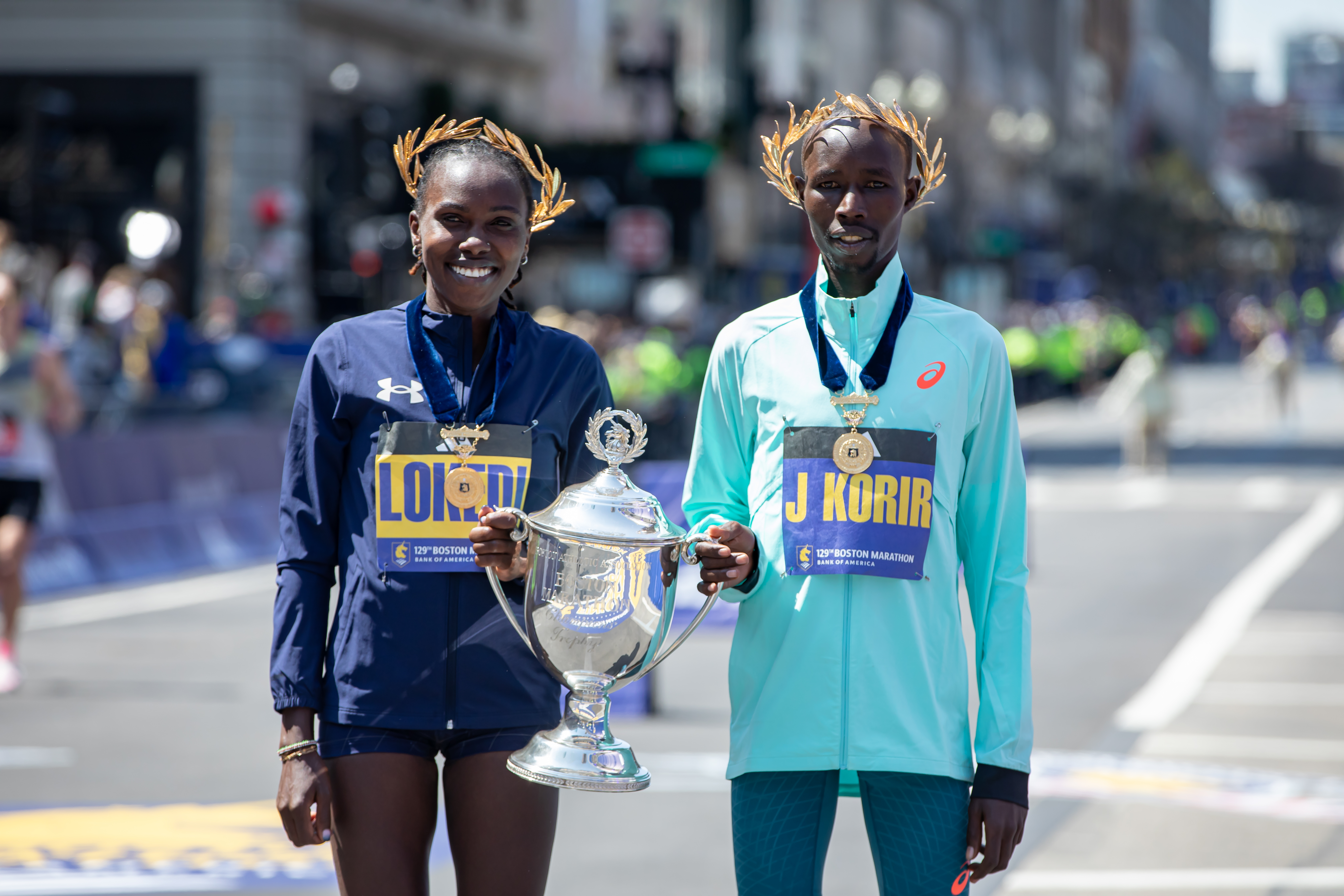
Winners Sharon Lokedi and John Korir pose together after their victories

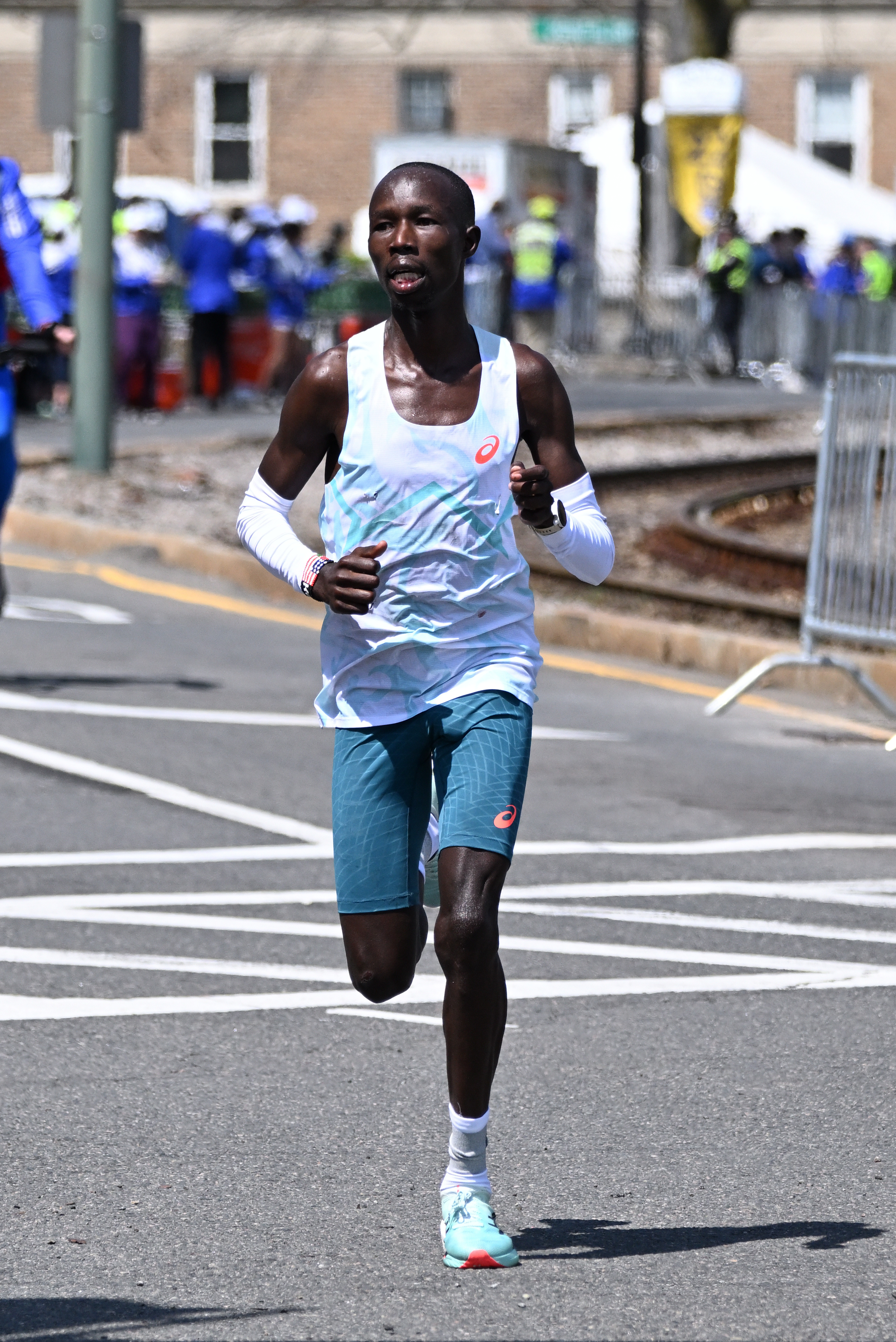
John Korir during the marathon

Elite men top finishers
Place	Athlete	Nationality	Time
1st place, gold medalist(s)	John Korir	Kenya	2:04:45
2nd place, silver medalist(s)	Alphonce Simbu	Tanzania	2:05:04
3rd place, bronze medalist(s)	Cybrian Kotut	Kenya	2:05:04
4	Conner Mantz	United States	2:05:08
5	Muktar Edris	Ethiopia	2:05:59
6	Rory Linkletter	Canada	2:07:02
7	Clayton Young	United States	2:07:04
8	Tebello Ramakongoana	Lesotho	2:07:19
9	Daniel Mateiko	Kenya	2:07:52
10	Ryan Ford	United States	2:08:00

John Korir's brother, Wesley Korir, won the 2012 Boston Marathon, making them the first brothers to have both won the event.

Defending champion Sisay Lemma appeared to have a leg issue approximately 17 miles (27 km) into the race and did not finish.

Jordan Maddocks of Utah, sponsored by Chiquita Banana, finished dressed in a banana costume with a time of 2:33:19, breaking the world record for fastest marathon run in a fruit costume.

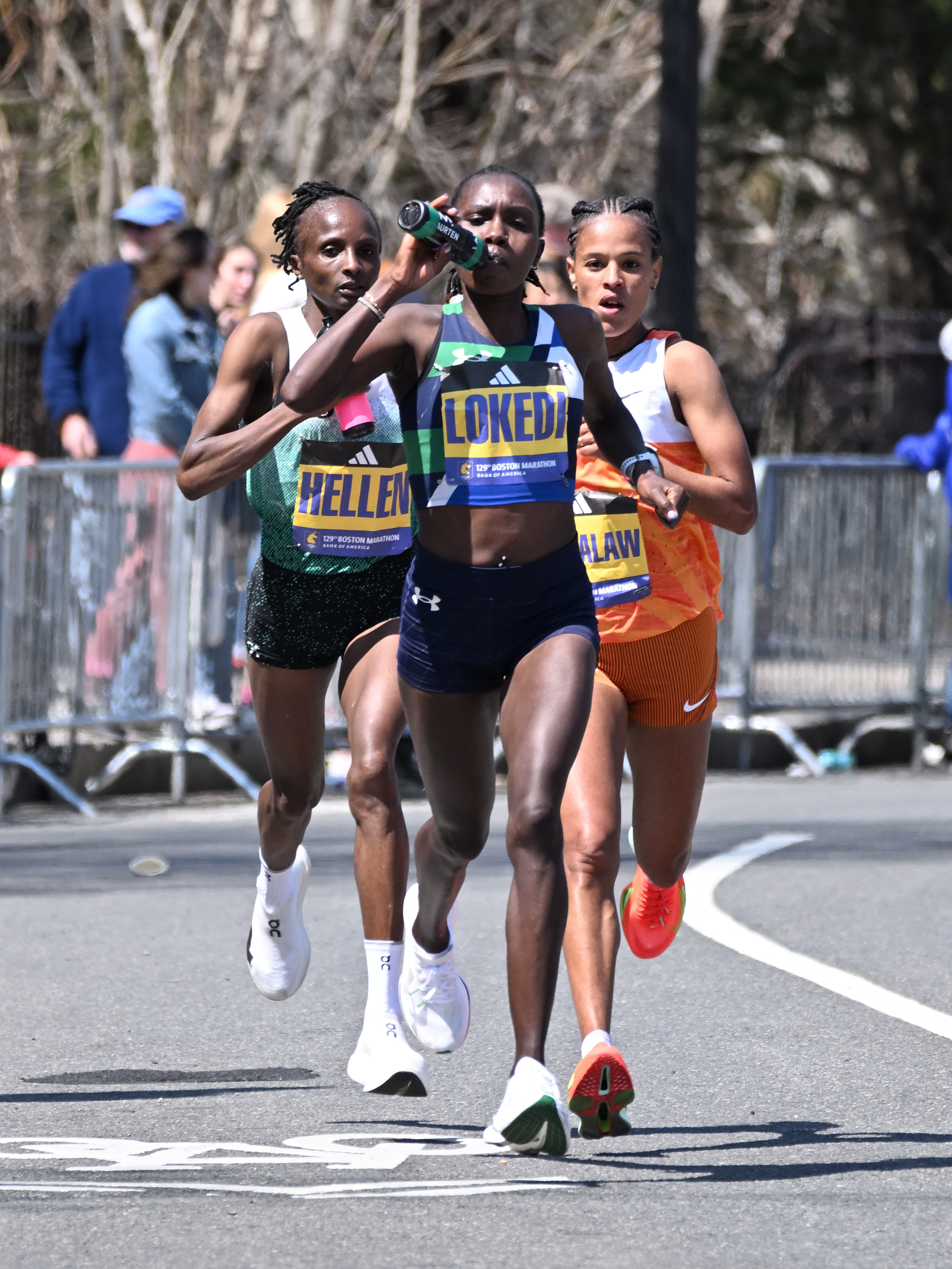
Sharon Lokedi, Hellen Obiri, and Yalemzerf Yehualaw

Elite women top finishers
Place	Athlete	Nationality	Time
1st place, gold medalist(s)	Sharon Lokedi	Kenya	2:17:22
2nd place, silver medalist(s)	Hellen Obiri	Kenya	2:17:41
3rd place, bronze medalist(s)	Yalemzerf Yehualaw	Ethiopia	2:18:06
4	Irene Cheptai	Kenya	2:21:32
5	Amane Beriso	Ethiopia	2:21:58
6	Calli Hauger-Thackery	United Kingdom	2:22:38
7	Jessica McClain	United States	2:22:43
8	Annie Frisbie	United States	2:23:21
9	Stacy Ndiwa	Kenya	2:23:29
10	Tsige Haileslase	Ethiopia	2:23:43

Lokedi's time of 2:17:22 set a new course record for women, besting the prior mark of 2:19:59 set by Buzunesh Deba in the 2014 Boston Marathon.

Desiree Linden, women's champion of the 2018 Boston Marathon, completed the race in 2:26:18 after announcing that this would be her final race as a professional.

=== Wheelchair ===
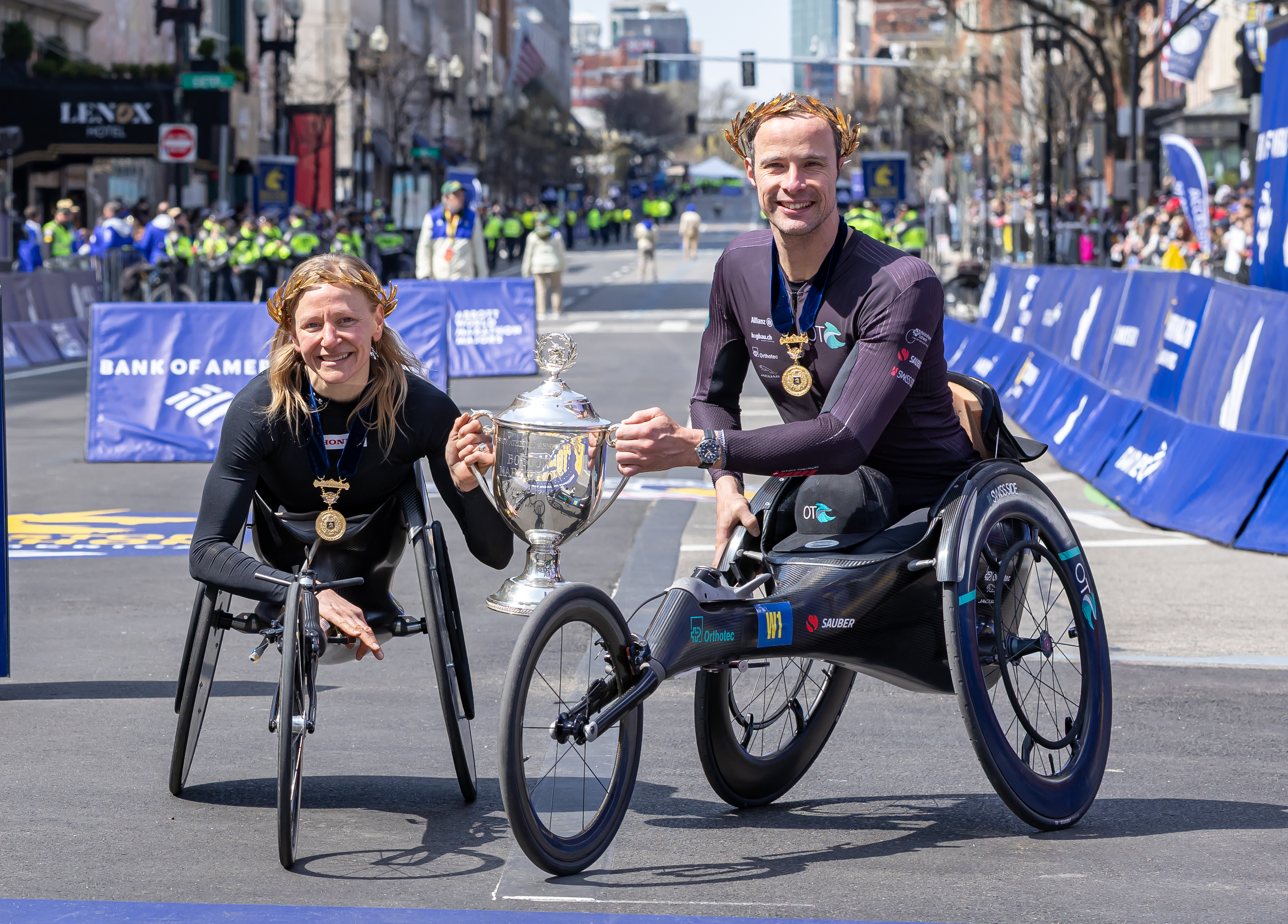
Wheelchair winners Susannah Scaroni and Marcel Hug pose after their victories

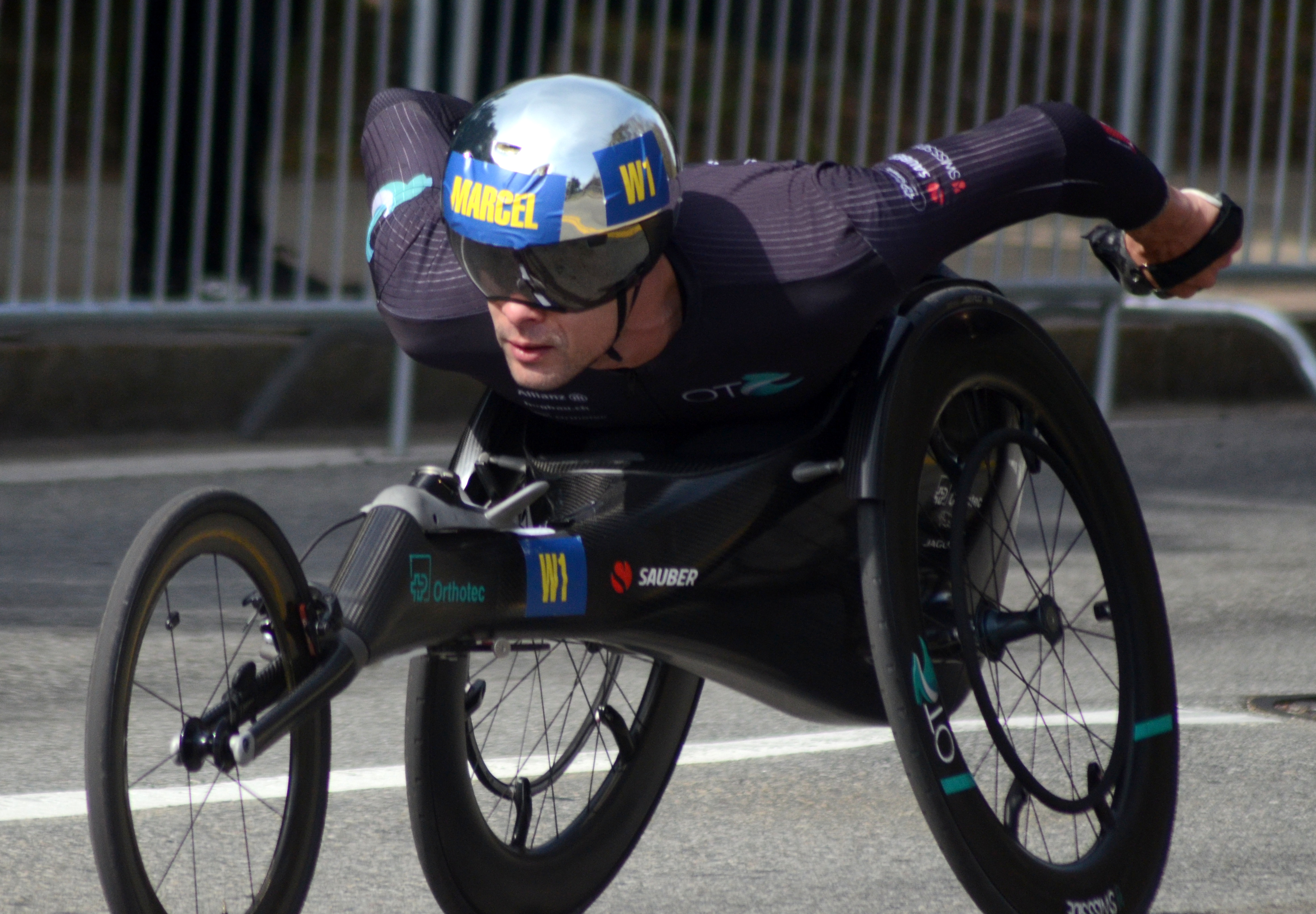
Marcel Hug near the halfway point

Men's wheelchair top finishers
Place	Athlete	Nationality	Time
1st place, gold medalist(s)	Marcel Hug	Switzerland	1:21:34
2nd place, silver medalist(s)	Daniel Romanchuk	United States	1:25:58
3rd place, bronze medalist(s)	Jetze Plat	Netherlands	1:30:16

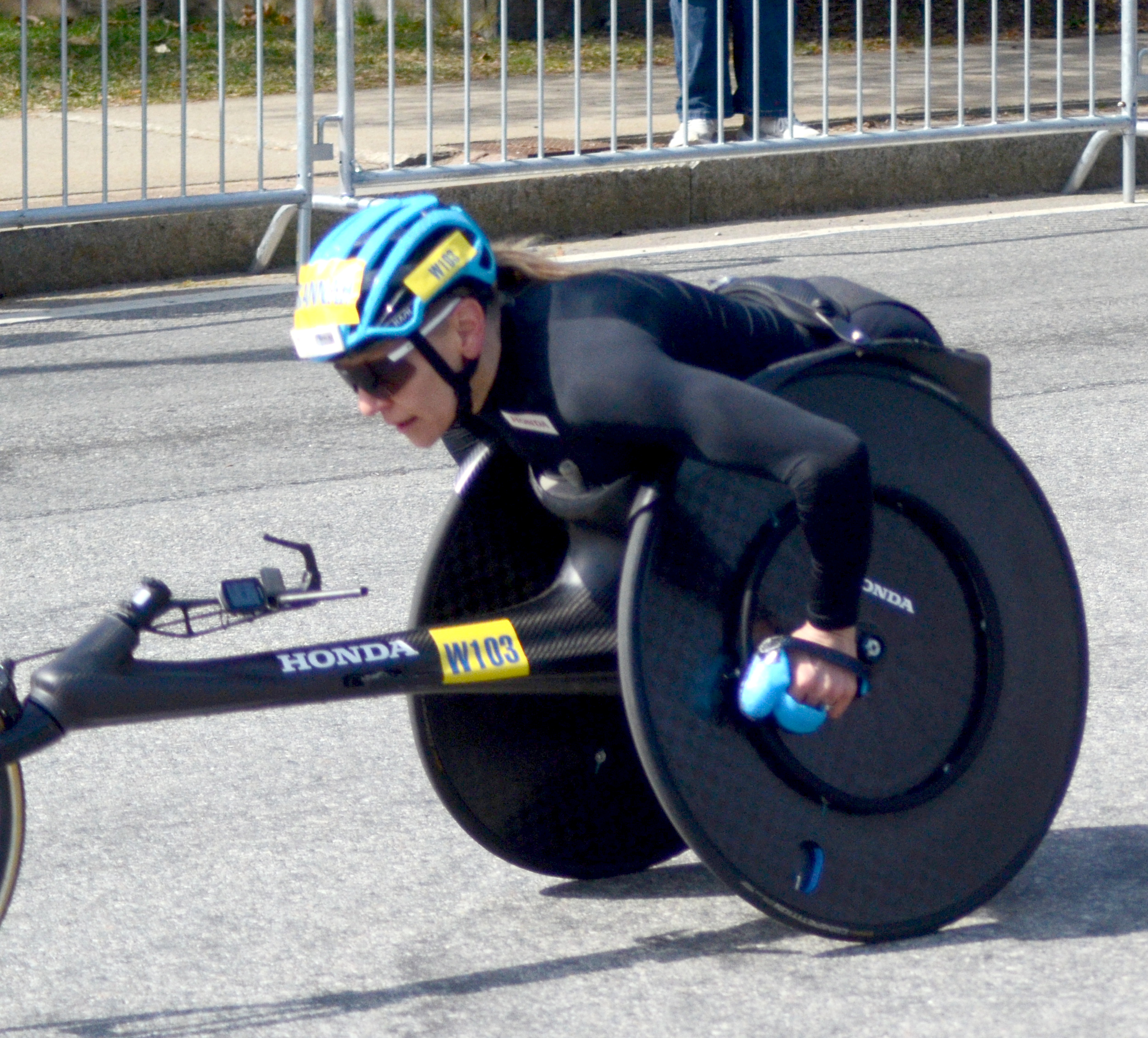
Susannah Scaroni near the halfway point

Women's wheelchair top finishers
Place	Athlete	Nationality	Time
1st place, gold medalist(s)	Susannah Scaroni	United States	1:35:20
2nd place, silver medalist(s)	Catherine Debrunner	Switzerland	1:37:26
3rd place, bronze medalist(s)	Manuela Schär	Switzerland	1:39:18

=== Handcycle ===
Men's handcycle top finishers
Place	Athlete	Nationality	Time
1st place, gold medalist(s)	Alfredo de los Santos	United States	1:07:36
2nd place, silver medalist(s)	Zachary Stinson	United States	1:13:30
3rd place, bronze medalist(s)	Casey Falkner	United States	1:15:23

Women's handcycle top finishers
Place	Athlete	Nationality	Time
1st place, gold medalist(s)	Jo Ann Outten-Kenton	United States	1:42:57
2nd place, silver medalist(s)	Edie Perkins	United States	1:42:57
3rd place, bronze medalist(s)	Katty Abran	Canada	1:43:07

=== Military March category ===
Top three finishers in the 2025 Military March category of the Boston Marathon

In this category, Massachusetts Army and Air National Guard personnel competed in uniform. The race began at 6:00 AM, with participants required to walk the entire course, running prohibited. In 2025, US Army's Lt Col Jon Novak finished in first place, Major Titmas placed in second place, while Captain Kanwar Singh finished in the third place.
