= Dakotah Popehn =

American runner (born 1995)

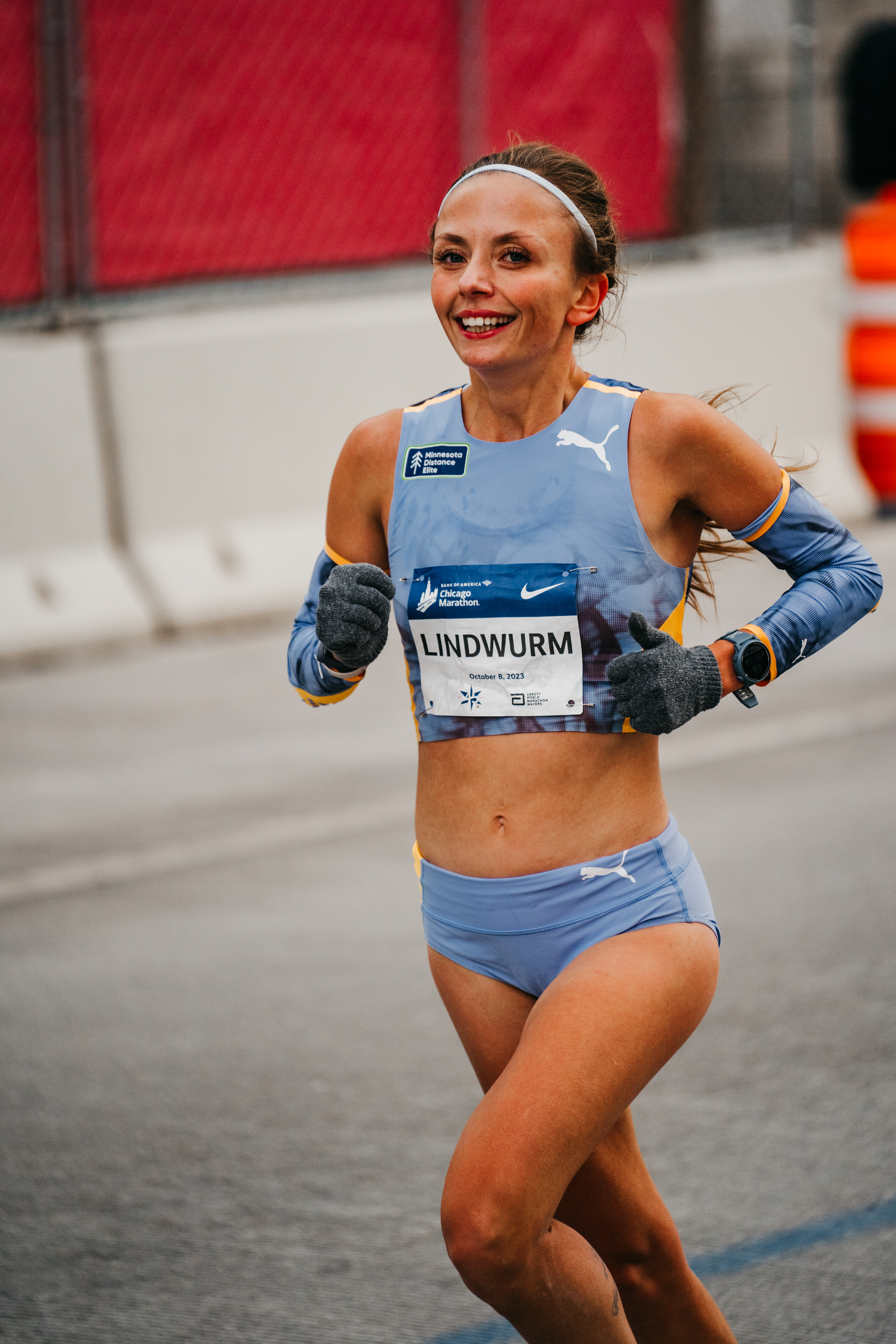
- Popehn at the 2023 Chicago Marathon

Personal information
- Full name: Dakotah Marie Popehn
- Nationality: American
- Born: May 1, 1995 (age 31)
- Employer: Puma
- Height: 5 ft 1 in (1.54 m)

Sport
- Sport: long-distance running
- Events: half marathon, marathon
- College team: Northern State University Wolves
- Club: Minnesota Distance Elite
- Coached by: Chris Lundstrom

Achievements and titles
- Personal bests: 10 Mile: 52:57; Half Marathon: 1:07:42; Marathon: 2:24:00

Dakotah Marie Popehn (formerly Lindwurm; née Bullen, b. May 1, 1995) is an American professional long-distance runner sponsored by Puma who represented the United States at the 2024 Summer Olympics. Popehn won back-to-back victories at Grandma's Marathon in Duluth, Minnesota in 2021 and 2022. Her victory in 2022 made her the 12th fastest U.S. women's marathoner of all time.

== Early career ==
Before she began running, Popehn was a goalie for the St. Francis-North Branch girls hockey team.

She then started running at St. Francis High School in St. Francis, Minnesota, where she competed in cross country and track and field.

After graduating from high school in 2013, Popehn started her collegiate running career at Northern State University in Aberdeen, South Dakota. While competing for the Northern State Wolves, she was a five-time NCAA Division II National Qualifier and a two time All-American. Her best track championship finish came in 2017 as a junior, when she finished 6th in the 10,000 meters.

Her senior year, she and her teammate Sasha Hovind were the lone Wolves at the NCAA Division II cross country championships. Popehn finished 34th in 21:39.

From 2014 to 2016, she also raced and won the Eugene Curnow Trail Marathon, a trail marathon near Duluth, Minnesota, that follows southern segments of the Superior Hiking Trail.

== Professional career ==
After graduating from college in 2017, Popehn focused her efforts on professional running. She joined the Minnesota Distance Elite team and gained professional entry into the 2018 Garry Bjorklund Half Marathon, where she finished 13th in 1:16:16.

Popehn won the Brian Kraft 5k in 16:21, which is one of the most competitive 5Ks in the state. At the Get in Gear 10K on the Mississippi River Roads, she finished fourth in 33:42.

=== 2019 ===
After her local success, she prepared for the 2019 Grandma's Marathon. On the route from Two Harbors to Duluth, Minnesota, Popehn finished fourth in 2:34:02. Her time qualified her for the 2020 U.S. Olympic Trials Marathon, and she vowed to return to Grandma's to attempt another win.

Popehn's next marathon was the 2019 Twin Cities Marathon. From 12 miles (19 km) until about 23 miles (37 km), she led the field. Popehn was passed by Julia Kohnen on Summit Avenue. Kohnen went on to win the race with a time was 2:31:29. Popehn finished second in 2:32:49, minutes ahead of third-place finisher, Heather Lieberg. Popehn's motto is "I am strong. I am fast. My speed will last." and is first documented as having been written across Popehn's arm during the race.

=== 2020 ===
At the 2020 Olympic Trials race in Atlanta, Popehn finished 36th in 2:39:08.

=== 2021 ===
Popehn returned to Grandma's Marathon in 2021. She won the race with a time of 2:29:04. She became the first Minnesotan-born woman to win since Janice Ettle's 1991 victory. As a result of her performance, Popehn was named the female athlete of the year in South Dakota, where she resided at the time.

At the autumn running of the 2021 Boston Marathon, Popehn ran well through the first half and was one of two American women in the lead pack. For a while, she led the pack as the others were waiting for someone to make a move. She dropped back as Colorado runner Nell Rojas kept moving with Diana Kipyokei and other Kenyan runners. Popehn finished 13th overall and was the third-place American woman in 2:31:04. Her overall place improved to 12th after Kipyokei's win was vacated after she failed a doping test.

=== 2022 ===
At the 2022 Boston Marathon, Popehn was featured as one of the top American women, along with Elaina Tabb, Stephanie Bruce, and Sara Vaughn. During the race, she tied the fastest 5K split of all the female racers (along with 2018 winner Des Linden and Canadian Malindi Elmore). Popehn finished as the 14th overall woman (and the fourth American) in 2:29:55.

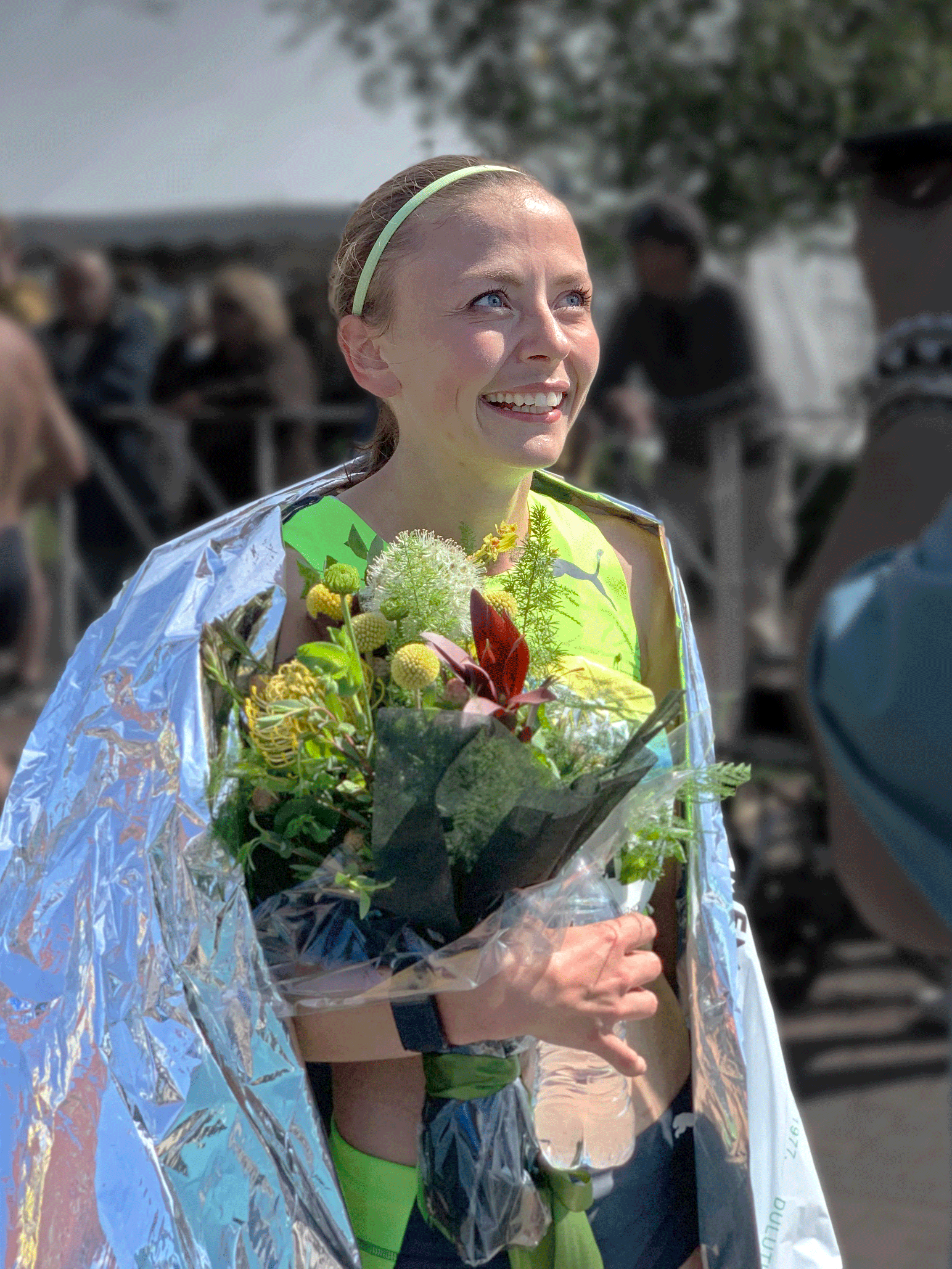
Popehn after winning the 2022 Grandma's Marathon.

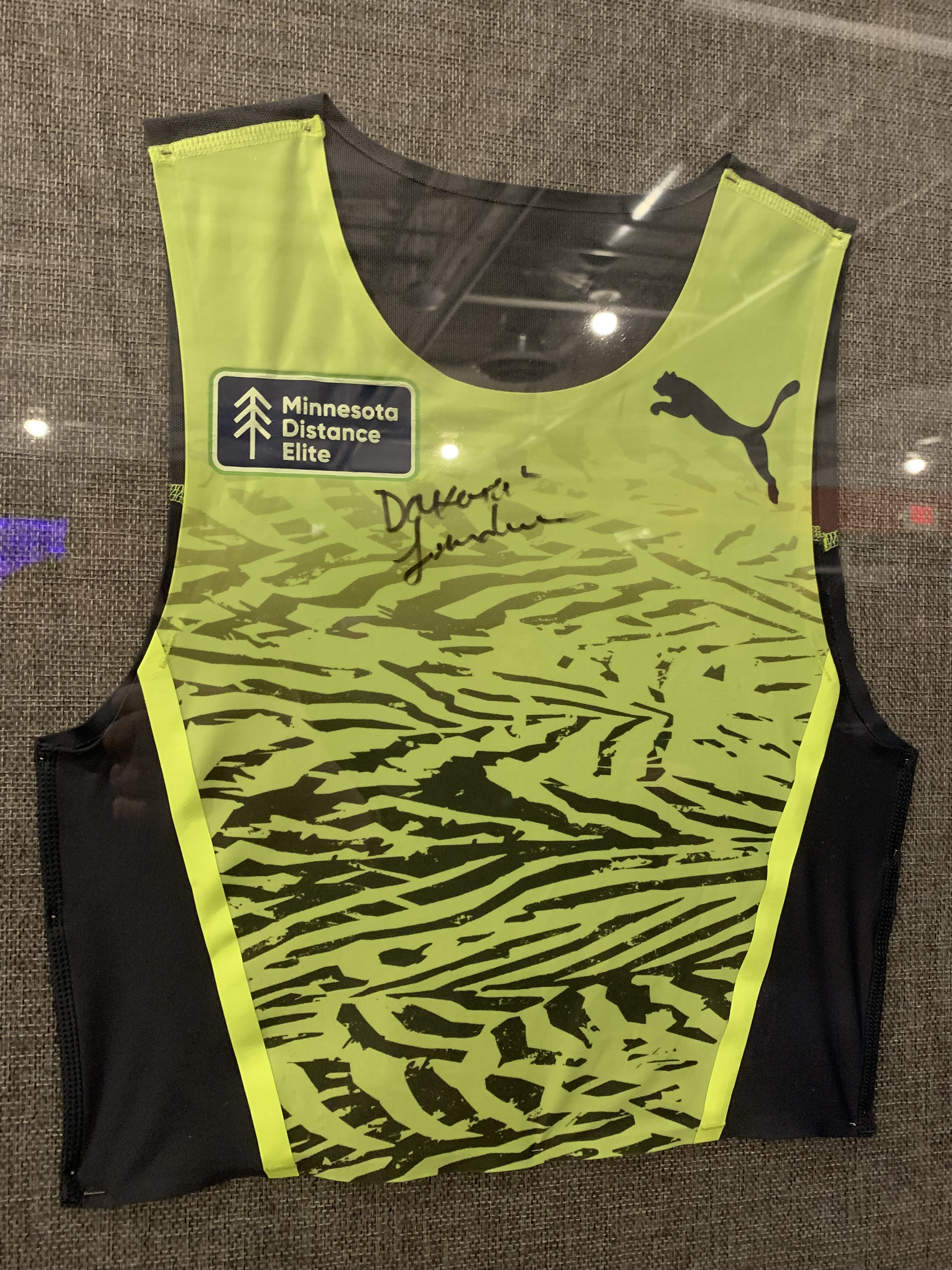
Dakotah Popehn’s signature on a Puma race top she wore when she won Grandma's Marathon in 2022

In the summer of 2022, Popehn took a second victory at Grandma's Marathon. Her winning time was a new marathon personal record of 2:25:01, narrowly missing the all-time course record. Popehn's time ranked her the ninth-fastest U.S. woman marathoner of 2022.

=== 2023 ===
She competed at the 2023 15K USATF Championship, which took place March 4 at the Gate River Run in Jacksonville, Florida. She finished in 52:03 for 4th place as Emily Sisson won her third title.

On March 19, 2023, she placed sixth in the New York City Half Marathon, four seconds behind Des Linden. The race was won by Hellen Obiri.

Popehn was listed as one of the top American contenders for the 2023 Boston Marathon. The women's race unfolded tactically. A large pack ran together during the first 5K, then splintered some at the 10K. In the final miles, Obiri broke ahead for the win, with many American runners following in personal record-setting times. Emma Bates finished in 2:22:10—for fifth place, Aliphine Tuliamuk and Nell Rojas both ran under 2:25 for PRs. Popehn's pace slowed as the race stretched out; she finished in 2:33:53 for 26th.

She ran the 2023 USATF 25K Championships at the Amway River Bank Run, where she finished fourth in 1:25:58 after Betsy Saina, Keira D'Amato, and Jessa Hanson.

At the June running of Grandma's Marathon, Popehn led most of the way. A chase pack that included Lauren Hagans, Gabi Rooker, and Grace Kahura made gains after the half. Hagans caught Popehn after running behind her for a half mile, then passed her to take the win in her debut marathon. Popehn finished second in 2:26:56.

October's Chicago Marathon had near perfect conditions for racing. Sifan Hassan won the race in 2:13:44. Popehn stayed in the mix with the top women and ended up running near fellow Minnesotans Gabi Rooker and Emma Bates. Popehn finished 12th overall, with a new personal best time of 2:24:40. She was the fifth American behind Emily Sisson, Molly Seidel, Sara Vaughn, and Gabi Rooker.

=== 2024 ===
On February 3, 2024, Popehn ran 2:25:31 at the US Olympic Marathon Trials at Orlando, Florida, to place third and qualify for the Marathon at the 2024 Olympic Games in Paris. She finished behind Fiona O'Keeffe and Emily Sisson, both of whom also qualified.

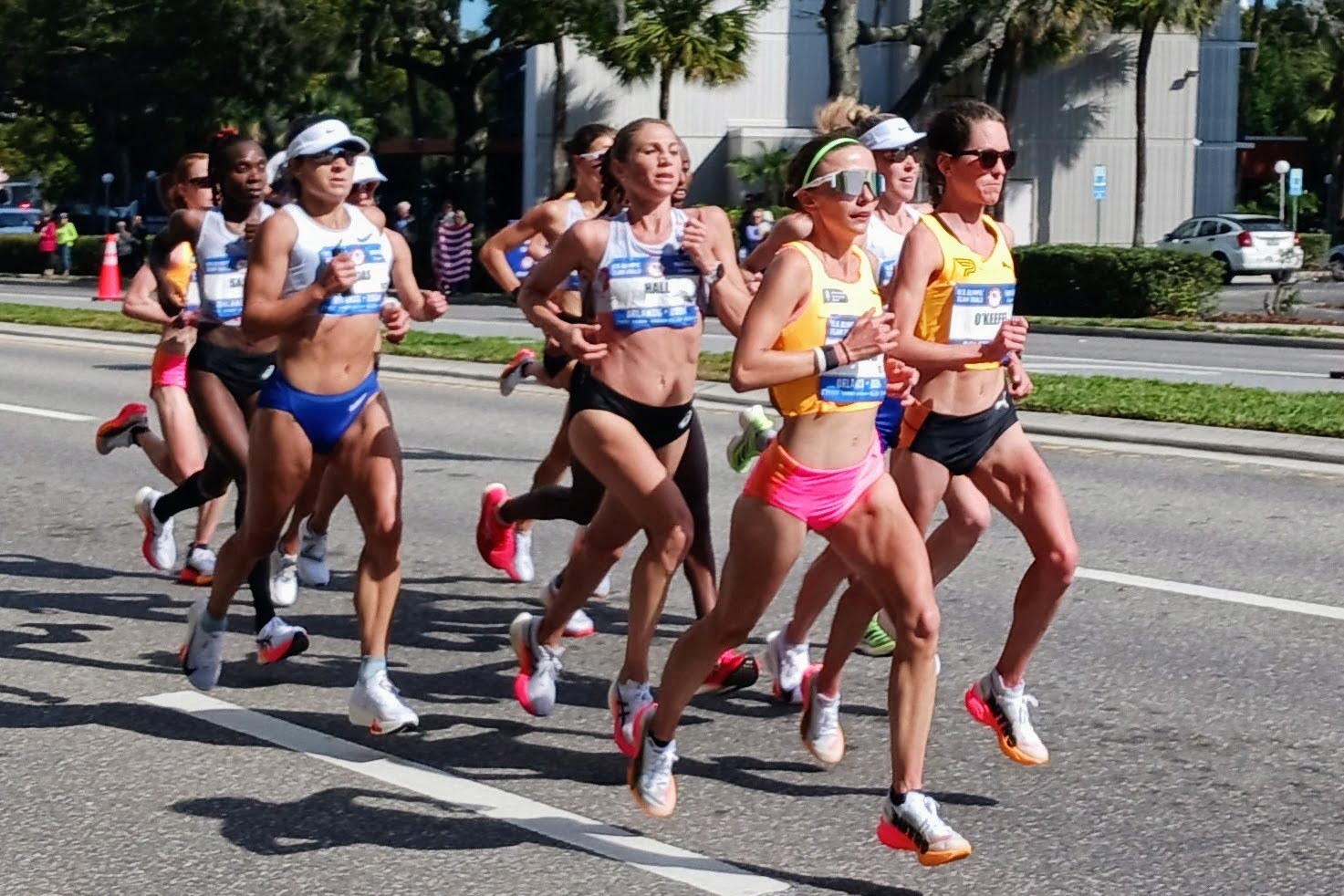
Popehn (center-right) competing at the 2024 US Olympic Marathon Trials

On Saturday, June 22, 2024, at the Garry Bjorklund Half Marathon, Popehn set a new PR with a time of 1:08:03, finishing in 2nd place after Annie Frisbie. Both women broke the previous course record.

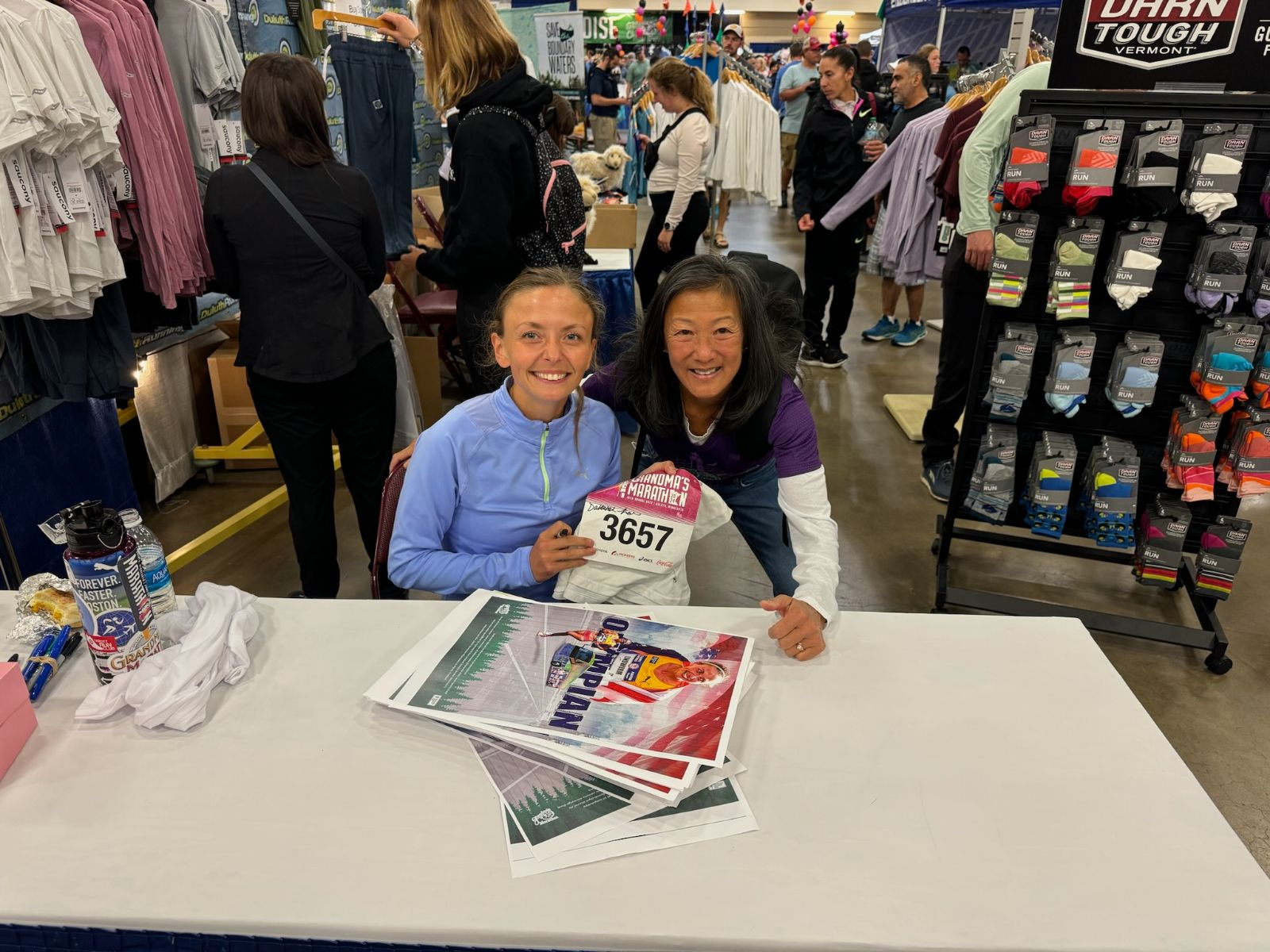
Popehn signing autographs at the 2024 Grandma's Marathon expo.

Popehn competed in the 2024 Paris Olympics Women's marathon on August 11, finishing in 12th place with a time of 2:26:44.

Popehn competed in the New York City Marathon on November 3, 2024, finishing in 17th place. She led the race briefly in the early miles.

=== 2025 ===
Popehn finished 16th overall and fourth among American women at the 2025 Boston Marathon. In the fall, she ran 2:24:20 at the 2025 Chicago Marathon to finish seventh overall and second for Americans behind Natosha Rogers.

=== 2026 ===
Popehn placed 12th at the 2026 Boston Marathon and two months later she won the Grandma's Marathon. In the fall, she set a new personal-best time of 2:24:00 at the 2026 Chicago Marathon, placing 12th overall and second for Americans behind Emma Grace Hurley.

== Personal life ==
Popehn is a coach through Team RunRun. She lives with her husband in the Twin Cities.

== Achievements ==
Year	Competition	Venue	Position	Event	Notes
Representing the United States
2026	Chicago Marathon	Chicago	12th	Marathon	2:24:00
2026	Grandma's Marathon	Duluth, Minnesota	1st	Marathon	2:28:51
2026	Boston Marathon	Boston	12th	Marathon	2:24:04
2025	Chicago Marathon	Chicago	7th	Marathon	2:24:20
2025	Boston Marathon	Boston	16th	Marathon	2:26:09
2024	New York City Marathon	New York City	17th	Marathon	2:31:45
2024	Paris Olympics	Paris, France	12th	Marathon	2:26:44
2024	US Olympic Trials Marathon	Orlando, Florida	3rd	Marathon	2:25:31
2023	Chicago Marathon	Chicago, Illinois	12th	Marathon	2:24:40
2023	Grandma's Marathon	Two Harbors to Duluth, Minnesota	2nd	Marathon	2:26:56
2023	New York City Half Marathon	New York City	6th	Half Marathon	1:12:25
2023	Faxon Law New Haven Road Race	New Haven, Connecticut	6th	20 km	1:07:42
2023	USA National Championship 15K at Gate River Run	Jacksonville, Florida	4th	15 km	52:03
2023	Boston Marathon	Hopkinton to Boston, Massachusetts	27th	Marathon	2:33:53
2022	Grandma's Marathon	Two Harbors to Duluth, Minnesota	1st	Marathon	2:25:01
2022	Amway River Bank Run	Grand Rapids, Michigan	3rd	25 km	1:26:39
2022	Boston Marathon	Hopkinton to Boston, Massachusetts	14th	Marathon	2:29:55
2022	Houston Half Marathon	Houston, Texas	8th	Half Marathon	1:09:36
2021	USA Half Marathon Championships at Mortgage Network Half Marathon	Hardeeville, South Carolina	3rd	Half Marathon	1:09:40
2021	Grandma's Marathon	Two Harbors to Duluth, Minnesota	1st	Marathon	2:29:04
2021	Gate River Run	Jacksonville, Florida	14th	15 km	51:31
2021	Boston Marathon	Hopkinton to Boston, Massachusetts	12th	Marathon	2:31:04
2020	US Olympic Marathon Trials	Atlanta, Georgia	36th	Marathon	2:39:08
2020	Aramco Houston Half Marathon	Houston, Texas	40th	Half-Marathon	1:12:37
2019	Twin Cities Marathon	Minneapolis to St. Paul, Minnesota	2nd	Marathon	2:32:49
2019	Faxon Law New Haven Road Race	New Haven, Connecticut	15th	20 km	1:12:15
2019	Grandma's Marathon	Two Harbors to Duluth, Minnesota	4th	Marathon	2:34:02
2019	Amway River Bank Run	Grand Rapids, Michigan	5th	25 km	1:28:01
2016	Eugene Curnow Trail Marathon	Duluth to Carlton, Minnesota	1st	Trail Marathon	4:01:56
2015	Eugene Curnow Trail Marathon	Duluth to Carlton, Minnesota	1st	Trail Marathon	3:57:17
2014	Eugene Curnow Trail Marathon	Duluth to Carlton, Minnesota	1st	Trail Marathon	4:21:41
