= Lauren Hagans =

American long-distance runner (born 1986)

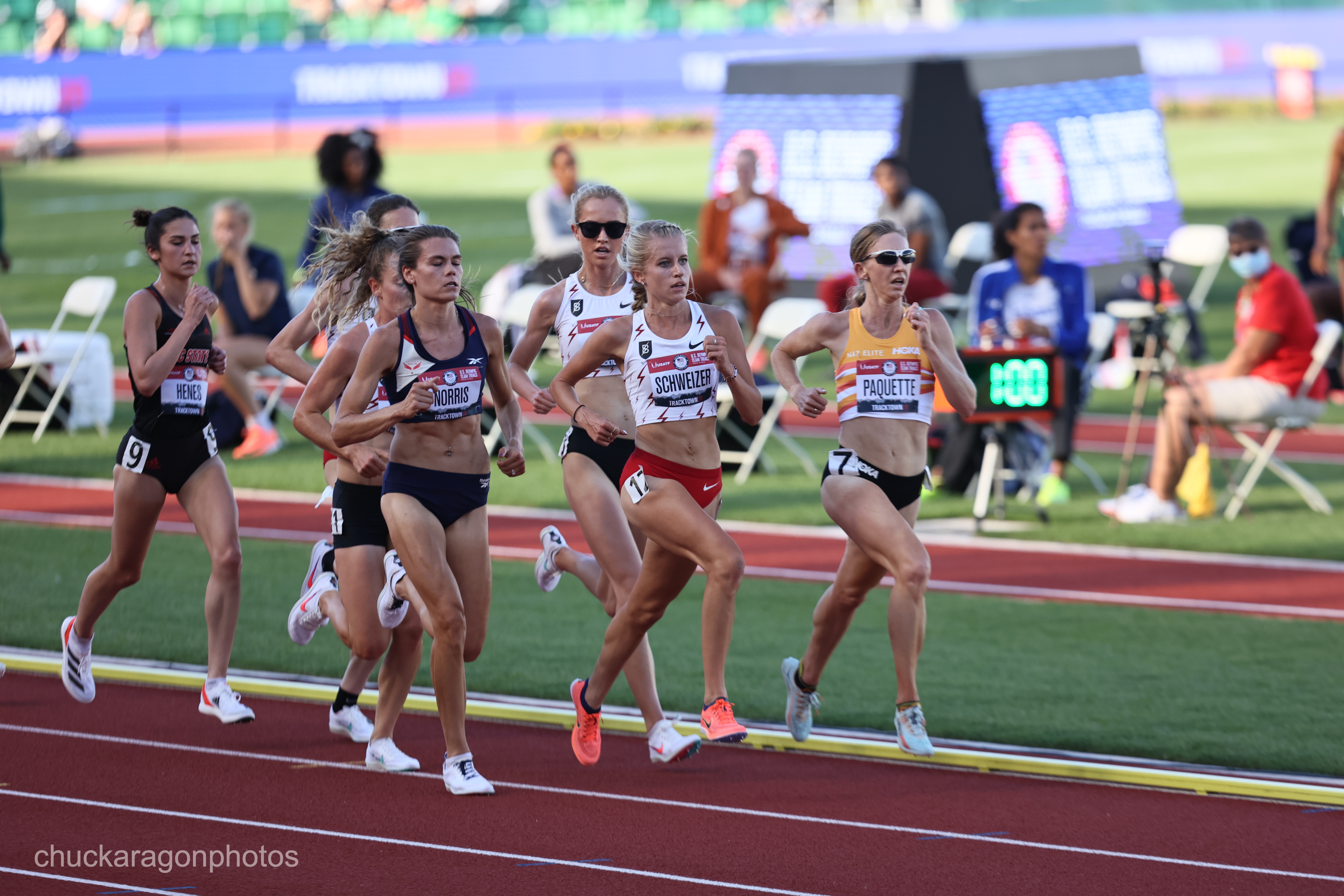
- Lauren Hagans (first on right) in 2021

Personal information
- Born: June 27, 1986 (age 39) Little Rock, Arkansas
- Home town: Flagstaff, Arizona
- Education: Little Rock Christian Academy, Baylor UniversityUniversity of Tennessee
- Height: 5 ft 3 in (1.60 m)

Sport
- Country: United States
- Club: Northern Arizona Elite

Lauren Elise Hagans (known as Lauren Paquette until 2023) is an American long-distance runner. In 2024, she qualified for the US Olympic marathon trials, her fourth running trials qualifier, and won Grandma's Marathon in 2023.

== College ==
Hagans ran cross country and track at Baylor University. Her college coach, Todd Harbour, said the 2005 to 2007 team—led by Hagans—was among the best he's ever had.

Hagans was inducted into the Baylor Athletics Hall of Fame in 2019.

== Professional career ==
In June 2010, Hagans competed in the 1500 m at the USA Track and Field Championships in Des Moines, Iowa. She finished in 12th place with a time of 4:25.03.

In spring 2011, Hagans competed in the Drake Relays by running the 1500 m. She finished in fourth place with a time of 4:16.87.

In June 2011, Hagans competed in the 1500 m at the USA Track and Field Championships in Eugene, Oregon. She missed the finals by 0.01 second having been narrowly edged at the finish by Jordan Hasay.

In December 2022, Hagans competed in the USATF Cross Country Championships. Her team finished in third place.

In February 2023, Hagans ran the half marathon at the Cowtown Marathon in Fort Worth, Texas. Hagans finished in second place behind her teammate Aliphine Tuliamuk.

In June 2023, Hagans ran Grandma's Marathon as her first marathon and won the race with the fourth fastest time in the race's history. She passed two-time Grandma's Marathon champion Dakotah Popehn with about 6 miles (9.7 km) to go. Popehn hoped Hagans would slow the pace on Lemon Drop Hill, but that didn't happen. Hagan picked Grandma's Marathon due to its medium size and timing before the US Olympic marathon trials. During her eight-week build, Hagans ran 70 miles (110 km) per week and missed several key tempo workouts due to injury.

In October 2023, Hagans competed at the Valencia Half Marathon in Spain and ran a personal record time of 1:09:41 finishing in 10th place.

Hagans competed in the 2024 US Olympic marathon trials in Orlando, Florida. She dropped out of the race due to injury.

Hagans ran the 2024 Faxon Law New Haven Road Race in which she finished in sixth place over the 25 km distance with a time of 1:07:43.

Hagans ran the 2024 Chicago Marathon, in which she finished in 13th place with a personal record time of 2:25:47.

As of 2025, Hagans will no longer be part of Northern Arizona Elite or be sponsored by Hoka One One.

== Achievements ==
Year	Competition	Venue	Position	Event	Notes
2024	Chicago Marathon	Chicago, Illinois	13th	Marathon	2:25:47
2024	Faxon Law New Haven Road Race	New Haven, Connecticut	6th	25 km	1:07:43
