= New Haven Road Race =

Road race held in New Haven, Connecticut

- Date: Labor Day
- Location: New Haven, Connecticut, U.S.
- Event type: Road
- Distance: 20 km
- Primary sponsor: Faxon Law
- Established: 1978
- Course records: Men: 56:16; Conner Mantz (2025); Women: 1:04:29; Keira D'Amato (2022)
- Website: http://www.newhavenroadrace.org/
- Participants: 7,000+

The New Haven Road Race is a 20 kilometer road race held in New Haven, Connecticut which was started in 1978. The race is held during the Labor Day weekend.

== History ==
The first year the race was contested was in 1978, when nearly 1,200 runners showed up. The race director convinced the reigning marathon world champion, Bill Rodgers, to headline the race. The record number of competitors was in 2013, when over 7,000 people ran. As of 2021, there are 8 competitors who have run the race every year since its inauguration.

Many years, the race has been host to the USATF 20k championships. During these years, elite athlete coordination is provided exclusively to domestic athletes, to incentivize American citizens to compete.

Most years, the prize purse is around $40,000, with various incentives for breaking records. Money is paid out 10 deep.

From the races inauguration to 1985, there was no presenting sponsor. From 1985 to 1989, American National Bank was the main sponsor. In 2003, New Haven Savings Bank was the main sponsor. In 2004 and 2005 NewAlliance Foundation was the primary sponsor. Since 2007, Faxon Law Group has been the presenting sponsor.

== Results ==
Key: Course record Virtual Race

Edition	Year	Men's winner	Time (m:s)	Women's winner	Time (m:s)
1	1978	Bill Rodgers (USA)	1:02:46	Kiki Sweigart (USA)	1:19:32
2	1979	Dave Babirachi (USA)	1:03:36	Sally Sullivan (USA)	1:14:06
3	1980	Mike Roche (USA)	1:01:59	Sally Strauss (USA)	1:14:54
4	1981	Greg Meyer (USA)	59:08	Nancy Conz (USA)	1:10:39
5	1982	Greg Meyer (USA)	58:27	Nancy Conz (USA)	1:08:45
6	1983	Joseph Nzau (KEN)	1:00:10	Judi St. Hilaire (USA)	1:10:30
7	1984	Bill Reifsnyder (USA)	59:44	Anne Hird (USA)	1:09:48
8	1985	Bill Reifsnyder (USA)	58:39	Rosa Mota (POR)	1:05:38
9	1986	Bill Reifsnyder (USA)	59:53	Nancy Conz (USA)	1:10:35
10	1987	Rex Wilson (NZL)	59:55	Diane Gentry (USA)	1:11:12
11	1988	Bill Reifsnyder (USA)	1:00:57	Diane Gentry (USA)	1:09:33
12	1989	Bill Reifsnyder (USA)	59:24	Michele Bush (USA)	1:08:20
13	1990	Don Janicki (USA)	1:01:10	Lesley Ann Lehane (USA)	1:09:26
14	1991	Robert Kempainen (USA)	1:00:17	Michele Bush (USA)	1:09:17
15	1992	Simon Karori (KEN)	58:56	Jill Boltz (ENG)	1:07:51
16	1993	Simon Karori (KEN)	59:12	Gordon Bakoulis (USA)	1:10:37
17	1994	Jackson Kipngok (KEN)	58:44	Nancy Tinari (CAN)	1:08:58
18	1995	Gilbert Rutto (KEN)	58:28	Trina Painter (USA)	1:07:07
19	1996	Joseph Kamau (KEN)	58:33	Senoria Clarke (USA)	1:09:51
20	1997	John Kagwe (KEN)	59:09	Anne-Marie Lauck (USA)	1:09:28
21	1998	Khalid Khannouchi (MAR)	57:37	Colleen De Reuck (RSA)	1:05:11
22	1999	Joseph Kamau (KEN)	59:26	Teresa Wanjiku (KEN)	1:09:50
23	2000	William Kiptum (KEN)	59:43.5	Lyudmila Petrova (RUS)	1:08:38
24	2001	Dan Browne (USA)	1:00:10	Milena Glusac (USA)	1:07:49
25	2002	Dan Browne (USA)	59:20.1	Colleen De Reuck (USA)	1:07:52.4
26	2003	Mebrahtom Keflezighi (USA)	58:56.6	Marla Runyan (USA)	1:05:51.9
27	2004	Ryan Shay (USA)	59:53	Turena Lane (USA)	1:08:49
28	2005	Abdihakim Abdirahman (USA)	58:42	Blake Russell (USA)	1:06:43
29	2006	Ryan Hall (USA)	59:29	Marla Runyan (USA)	1:08:28
30	2007	Dan Browne (USA)	59:19	Alicia Shay (USA)	1:06:56
31	2008	James Carney (USA)	59:11	Jill Swope (USA)	1:08:48
32	2009	Brett Gotcher (USA)	58:57	Colleen De Reuck (USA)	1:07:21
33	2010	Sean Quigley (USA)	59:21	Magdalena Boulet (USA)	1:07:41
33	2011	Abdihakim Abdirahman (USA)	1:00:12	Janet Bawcom (USA)	1:08:31
34	2012	Matthew Tegenkamp (USA)	58:30	Renee Metivier (USA)	1:07:08
35	2013	Matthew Tegenkamp (USA)	1:00:10	Meghan Peyton (USA)	1:09:57
36	2014	Girma Mecheso (USA)	1:01:26	Molly Huddle (USA)	1:08:34
37	2015	Jared Ward (USA)	59:24	Molly Huddle (USA)	1:06:26
38	2016	Leonard Korir (USA)	59:15	Aliphine Tuliamuk (USA)	1:05:47
39	2017	Galen Rupp (USA)	59:04	Jordan Hasay (USA)	1:06:35
40	2018	Leonard Korir (USA)	1:00:17	Sarah Hall (USA)	1:09:04
41	2019	Leonard Korir (USA)	59:06	Sarah Hall (USA)	1:06:47
42	2020	Tyler Lyon (USA)	1:07:36	Annmarie Tuxbury (USA)	1:11:14
43	2021	Ben True (USA)	59:53	Erika Kemp (USA)	1:06:20
44	2022	Conner Mantz (USA)	59:08	Keira D'Amato (USA)	1:04:29
45	2023	Clayton Young (USA)	59:15	Emily Sisson (USA)	1:06:09
46	2024	Hillary Bor (USA)	58:09	Keira D'Amato (USA)	1:06:25
47	2025	Conner Mantz (USA)	56:16	Aubrey Frentheway (USA)	1:05:36
48	2026	|Kieran Tuntivate (THA)	58:03	Rachael Rudel (USA)	1:04:58
