= Bridget Munro =

Biomechanist researcher

Bridget Munro is the Nike Women's Research Director. She leads a team that uses science to develop innovative female apparel and footwear products and services. Prior to joining Nike in 2013, Munro was an Associate Professor (Biomechanics) at the University of Wollongong. Her research focused on improving athlete performance and injury prevention; clinical biomechanics and using smart materials to enhance medical device design and development.

== Biography ==
Munro grew up in Tasmania, Australia and played tennis as a junior, reaching the round of 32 in doubles in the 1990 Australian Open (Juniors) Grand Slam.

She obtained her PhD from the University of Wollongong where she examined the effects of household footwear-surface interactions on the gait of older arthritic females and pursued an academic career before moving to Nike.

== Research career ==
Munro's academic research primarily focused on athlete performance and injury prevention; clinical biomechanics and using smart materials to enhance medical device design and development. At Nike, she plays a major role in the ongoing investment in women-specific innovation. Her Nike Sports Research Lab team aims to learn more about female athletes to help them stay safe and motivated in their activity journey, through improved apparel and footwear products and services. An example of how the Nike Sports Research Lab team test women’s product with women’s specific science and technology is the use of the Nike “BraBot” which simulates breast movement and Haley, Nike’s female-form thermal mannequin that assesses temperature and sweat zones during exercise.

== Awards ==
- 2008 Faculty Early Career Academic Award for Outstanding Contribution to Teaching and Learning from the University of Wollongong
- 2013 Vice-Chancellor's Award for Interdisciplinary Research Excellence, University of Wollongong
- 2024 Carl F. Zorowski Distinguished Lecture, NC State University
