= Gabriella Rooker =

American long-distance runner (born 1987)

Personal information
- Nickname: Gabi
- Born: October 9, 1987 (age 39) New Brighton, Minnesota
- Home town: Minneapolis, Minnesota
- Education: Totino-Grace High School, University of Wisconsin–La Crosse

Sport
- Country: United States
- Club: Mill City Running, Raev Endurance
- Coached by: Alex Rooker

Gabriella Rooker (born October 9, 1987, Gabriella Hooper) is an American long-distance runner. She has qualified for the 2024 US Olympic marathon trials. In 2024, she was inducted into the University of Wisconsin La Crosse wall of fame.

== College ==
Rooker was a gymnast through college at the University of Wisconsin-La Crosse and in 2008 the Wisconsin Intercollegiate Athletic Conference recognized Rooker for her academic achievement while being on the university's gymnastics team. She has six Division III National Champion titles including vault (2007 and 2008), floor exercise (2010), and team (2008, 2009, 2010).

== Professional career ==
After college, Rooker started running with her husband, Alex. She had a breakout race at the 2019 Twin Cities 10 Mile in which she ran 62:06 and finished in ninth place. She said she was inspired to become even more competitive after a friend ran an Olympic time qualifying race the same year at the Twin Cities Marathon.

Rooker ran a 2:24:35 at the 2023 Chicago Marathon, finishing in 11th place. Afterward, Rooker said she felt like her life changed overnight and signed a contract with Nike after she realized there was mutual interest. She had planned to run the 2023 Chicago Marathon in her Mill City Running racing kit, but found out that wasn't allowed until the Tuesday before the race; she was able to acquire a Nike race kit through friends before the race.

Rooker qualified for the 2024 US Olympic marathon trials by running a 2:24:35 at the 2023 Chicago Marathon. Among Minnesota athletes who competed at the 2024 trials, Rooker had the fastest qualifying time being five seconds faster than that of Dakotah Popehn. Rooker finished in 19th place at the trials with a time of 2:31:25.

Rooker is one of 120 women who are a part of Nike Project Dreamweaver, a program the company ran from September 2021 to February 2024 to provide coaching, sports psychology, physiology support from the Nike Sports Research Lab, and shoes to unsponsored female athletes seeking an Olympic qualifying time.

== Personal life ==
Rooker is friends and Mill City Running teammates with Kim Horner.

Rooker works as a physician assistant. In 2010, the Wisconsin Comprehensive Cancer Control Program awarded Rooker a $7,000 grant to distribute free test kits for the early detection of colorectal cancer. At the time, Rooker was a community health education intern at Franciscan Skemp Healthcare Cancer Center, which is part of the Mayo Clinic Health System.

Rooker met her future coach and husband during her fourth year at the University of Wisconsin-La Crosse. After getting engaged on November 21, 2013, on the Stone Arch Bridge in Minneapolis, Minnesota. They got married on December 31, 2014, at the James J. Hill House in Saint Paul, Minnesota.

== Achievements ==
Year	Competition	Venue	Position	Event	Notes
2025	Chicago Marathon	Chicago, Illinois	9th	Marathon	2:26:32
2024	Chicago Marathon	Chicago, Illinois	12th	Marathon	2:24:29
2023	Chicago Marathon	Chicago, Illinois	11th	Marathon	2:24:35
2023	Grandma's Marathon	Two Harbors, Minnesota to Duluth, Minnesota	3rd	Marathon	2:27:38
2022	Medtronic Twin Cities 10 Mile	Minneapolis, Minnesota to Saint Paul, Minnesota	36th	10 mile	56:23
2021	Grandma's Marathon	Two Harbors, Minnesota to Duluth, Minnesota	11th	Marathon	2:56:27
2019	Medtronic Twin Cities 1 Mile	Minneapolis, Minnesota	3rd	1 mile	5:18.1
2018	Medtronic Twin Cities 10 Mile	Minneapolis, Minnesota to Saint Paul, Minnesota	194th	10 mile	1:06:02
2015	Medtronic Twin Cities 10 Mile	Minneapolis, Minnesota to Saint Paul, Minnesota	377th	10 mile	1:10:59
