= Amway River Bank Run =

Road running race

- Date: May
- Location: Grand Rapids, Michigan, United States
- Event type: Road
- Distance: 5K, 10K, 25K
- Established: 1978
- Website: amwayriverbankrun.com

The Amway River Bank Run is an annual road running race hosted by Amway in U.S. city of Grand Rapids, Michigan, in the month of May. The 25K run was created and first held in 1978 by Old Kent Bank as the Old Kent River Bank Run and continued under that name until 2000, when its name was changed to the Fifth Third River Bank Run. The name of the race changed again in late 2018 when Amway agreed to take over primary sponsorship of the race from Fifth Third Bank.

Today, the race draws over 22,000 participants from around the world. It features the largest 25K road race in the country, and is the site for the USA 25 km Open and Masters Championships. The event also features the only 25K Wheelchair Racing division in the world.

== Events ==
=== 25K Run ===
The USA 25 km Open and Masters Championships is open to U.S. citizens 14 years of age or older as of race day. The course is a USATF certified loop course which starts in downtown Grand Rapids and leaves the city going south, taking the runners through parks and along the Grand River before finishing back downtown.

==== Race within the race ====
2015 saw the introduction of the "race within the race" for the 25K. The Elite and USATF women are given an 11 minute, 30 second head start over the men. The first person to cross the finish line wins an additional prize.

=== 25K Wheel/handcycle ===
The Wheel/Handcycle Division follows the same course as the 25K run. Eligible participants have a physical disability which prohibits them from running the event. Race organizers state, "The race is for competitive cyclist only, this division is not designed for leisure racing."

=== 10k Run ===
This race is open to participants of any age who feel they can safely finish the race. The course is a USATF certified loop course which heads southwest from downtown Grand Rapids to John Ball Park and returns downtown to finish.

=== 5K Run ===
This race is open to participants of any age who feel they can safely finish the race. The course is a USATF certified loop course which takes the participants through downtown Grand Rapids.

=== 5K Walk ===
This race is open to participants of any age who feel they can safely finish the race. The participants follow the same course as the 5K run; they are not timed and awards are not given out.

=== Junior ===
Fifth Third Junior event takes place the Wednesday before the main event at East Kentwood High School in Kentwood, Michigan. More than 1,700 kids between the ages of 5-13 participate in the 1/2 mile and 1 mile fun runs and 5K Run.

== Classes and divisions ==
=== Clydesdale Division ===
Participants in the 25K, 10K, and 5K runs may choose to register in the Clydesdale Division, which divides them into either Class A or Class B by weight. Trophies for each race awarded to the top performers in each weight class in each division. Medals are awarded to the top three performers in each weight class in each division.

	Class A	Class B
Men	185-199 lbs	200+ lbs
Women	145-154 lbs	155+ lbs

=== Age divisions ===
Participants in each race are divided into male and female divisions based on age: 13 and under (not available in 25K), 14-19, 20-24, 25-29,30-34, 35-39, 40-44, 45-49, 50-54, 55-59, 60-64, 65-69, 70-74, 75-79 and 80+. The number of awards is three deep in each age division though some 25K divisions may issue fewer due to a reduced number of participants.

== Sponsorship ==
The primary sponsor for the event is Amway, who announced the change in sponsorship on October 10, 2018. The race was originally sponsored by Old Kent Bank and was held under the title "The Old Kent River Bank Run" until 2000 when Old Kent Bank was acquired by Fifth Third Bank. At that time, the name of the race changed but sponsorship was uninterrupted. A local rehabilitation center, Mary Free Bed Rehabilitation Hospital provides sponsorship for the Wheelchair and Handchair Divisions. Other sponsors include Metro Health Hospital, Gatorade, Pepsi, Gazelle Sports, Comcast, Meijer, and others.

== Past 25K winners ==
Key: Course record United States championship race Short course Race within the race winner

Edition	Year	Men's winner	Time (h:m:s)	Women's winner	Time (h:m:s)
1st	1978	Bill Rodgers (USA)	1:17:24	Diane Culp (USA)	1:42:09
2nd	1979	Greg Meyer (USA)	1:14:29	Cheryl Bridges (USA)	1:36:39
3rd	1980	Greg Meyer (USA)	1:16:02	Karen Blackford (USA)	1:37:46
4th	1981	Herb Lindsay (USA)	1:14:09	Joan Samuelson (USA)	1:26:21
5th	1982	Greg Meyer (USA)	1:15:00	Joan Samuelson (USA)	1:26:31
6th	1983	Greg Meyer (USA)	1:16:49	Jeanne Lasee (USA)	1:31:08
7th	1984	Doug Kurtis (USA)	1:17:56	Diane Gentry (USA)	1:32:18
8th	1985	Greg Meyer (USA)	1:16:58	Joan Samuelson (USA)	1:27:25
9th	1986	Greg Meyer (USA)	1:16:38	Joan Samuelson (USA)	1:24:43
10th	1987	Greg Meyer (USA)	1:16:12	Diane Gentry (USA)	1:28:17
11th	1988	Mark Smith (USA)	1:15:56	Diane Gentry (USA)	1:28:39
12th	1989	Brian Sheriff (ZIM)	1:16:34	Diane Gentry (USA)	1:25:34
13th	1990	Brian Sheriff (ZIM)	1:15:26	Diane Gentry (USA)	1:27:02
14th	1991	Mark Plaatjes (RSA)	1:15:31	Márcia Narloch (BRA)	1:28:29
15th	1992	Bill Reifsnyder (USA)	1:14:47	Olga Appell (MEX)	1:26:47
16th	1993	Jerry Lawson (USA)	1:16:06	Olga Appell (MEX)	1:27:27
17th	1994	Simon Karori (KEN)	1:15:01	Olga Appell (USA)	1:25:26
18th	1995	Keith Brantly (USA)	1:15:20	Elaine Van Blunk (USA)	1:27:14
19th	1996	Alfredo Vigueras (USA)	1:15:21	Jane Welzel (USA)	1:29:47
20th	1997	John Kagwe (KEN)	1:15:21	Kim Jones (USA)	1:26:54
21st	1998	Joseph Kariuki (KEN)	1:13:55	Margaret Kagiri (KEN)	1:28:46
22nd	1999	Joseph Kariuki (KEN)	1:14:09	Teresa Wanjiku (KEN)	1:26:51
23rd	2000	Joseph Kariuki (KEN)	1:16:26	Svetlana Zakharova (RUS)	1:27:35
24th	2001	John Kagwe (KEN)	1:14:06	Svetlana Zakharova (RUS)	1:24:39
25th	2002	Ronald Mogaka (KEN)	1:13:56	Teresa Wanjiku (KEN)	1:26:57
26th	2003	Dan Browne (USA)	1:16:13	Albina Ivanova (RUS)	1:27:28
27th	2004	Simon Wangai (KEN)	1:15:16	Alevtina Ivanova (RUS)	1:26:39
28th	2005	Simon Wangai (KEN)	1:13:27	Colleen De Reuck (USA)	1:25:15
29th	2006	Fernando Cabada (USA)	1:14:21	Viktoriya Klimina (RUS)	1:27:47
30th	2007	Julius Kibet Kosgei (KEN)	1:14:25	Katie McGregor (USA)	1:25:54
31st	2008	Brian Sell (USA)	1:15:07	Caroline Chepkorir Kwambai (KEN)	1:29:32
32nd	2009	Isaac Kemboi Kimaiyo (KEN)	1:15:36	Genoveva Kigen (KEN)	1:27:16
33rd	2010	Andrew Carlson (USA)	1:14:42	Firehiwot Dado (ETH)	1:23:46
34th	2011	Fernando Cabada (USA)	1:15:41	Molly Pritz (USA)	1:25:38
35th	2012	Robert Kiprotich Letting (KEN)	1:15:10	Janet Cherobon-Bawcom (USA)	1:24:36
36th	2013	Julius Kipyego Keter (KEN)	1:14:07	Chemutai Rionotukei (KEN)	1:25:45
37th	2014	Samson Gebreyohanes Gezahai (ERI)	1:14:08	Kellyn Johnson (USA)	1:25:26
38th	2015	Jared Ward (USA)	1:14:45	Lindsey Scherf (USA)	1:26:35
39th	2016	Christo Landry (USA)	1:15:31	Aliphine Tuliamuk-Bolton (USA)	1:25:35
40th	2017	Dathan Ritzenhein (USA)	1:14:27.0	Aliphine Tuliamuk (USA)	1:24:35.1
41st	2018	Sam Chelanga (USA)	1:14:52	Aliphine Tuliamuk (USA)	1:25:35
42nd	2019	Parker Stinson (USA)	1:13:48 AR	Emma Bates (USA)	1:23:51
