= Emily Sisson =

American long-distance runner (born 1991)

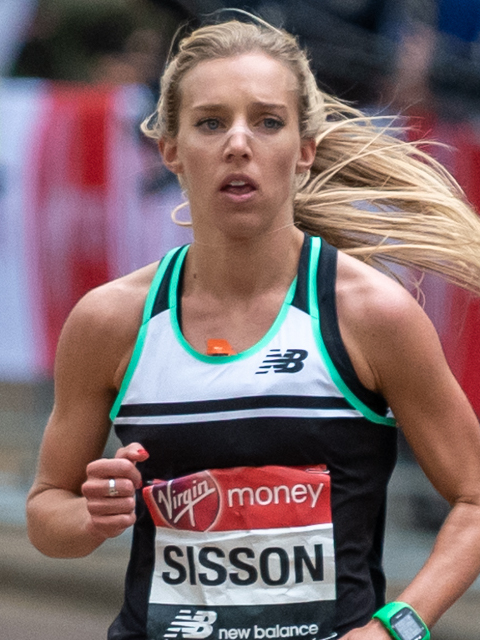
- Sisson at the 2019 London Marathon

Personal information
- Born: October 12, 1991 (age 35) Milwaukee, Wisconsin, U.S.
- Employer: New Balance
- Height: 5 ft 2 in (157 cm)
- Spouse: Shane Quinn

Sport
- Country: United States
- Sport: Athletics
- Event: Long-distance running
- College team: Providence Friars
- Turned pro: June 2015
- Coached by: Ray Treacy

Achievements and titles
- Olympic finals: 2021 Tokyo; 10,000 m, 10th; 2024 Paris; Marathon, 23rd
- World finals: 2017 London; 10,000 m, 9th; 2019 Doha; 10,000 m, 10th
- Personal bests: Track; 5000 m: 14:53.84 (Irvine 2021); 10,000 m: 30:49.57 (Palo Alto 2019); Road; Half marathon: 1:06:52 (Houston 2023); Marathon: 2:18:29 AR (Chicago 2022)
Medal record
Women's athletics
Representing the United States
World Marathon Majors
Silver medal – second place	2022 Chicago	Marathon
Pan American Junior Championships
Bronze medal – third place	2007 São Paulo	5000 m

Emily Sisson (born October 12, 1991) is an American long-distance runner. She set the North American record in the marathon on October 9, 2022, when she ran 2:18:29 to finish second at the Chicago Marathon. Sisson also held the American record in the half marathon from May 2022 until July 2023. She represented the United States in the 10000 metres at the 2017 and 2019 World Athletics Championships, finishing 9th and 10th. In June 2021, she won the 10000m at the 2020 US Olympic Trials and placed 10th in the 10000m final at the 2020 Summer Olympics. In 2024, she placed second in the marathon at the US Olympic Trials, qualifying for the 2024 Summer Olympics. She competed in the 2024 Paris Olympics Women's marathon on 11 August 2024, where she finished 23rd.

As a high schooler, Sisson set a U.S. national record for high school girls in the 5000 metres with a time of 15:48.91. She also earned a bronze medal at the 2007 Pan American Junior Athletics Championships. While at Providence College, she became a two-time NCAA Champion in the 5000m and set the collegiate indoor record for women in the same event. In addition, Sisson has won multiple national titles in USTAF-sponsored road races from 5 km to 20 km. She has competed professionally for New Balance since June 2015.

== Career ==
=== Middle and high school ===
Sisson started running in the seventh grade, and while still in middle school, she won a silver medal in the 3000 metres at the USATF National Junior Olympic Championships in 2005. After transitioning to high school, Sisson won multiple state championships in track and cross country in Nebraska. As a freshman in 2006 at Marian High School, she won the state cross country championship in the fall and the 3200m in the spring. She then transferred to Millard North High School for her sophomore year, where she continued her winning streak by reclaiming the state title in cross country and earning state titles in the 800m, 1600m, and 3200m.

In her last two years of high school, Sisson transferred to Parkway Central High School in Chesterfield, Missouri. There, she added two state cross country titles to her record, along with state championships in the 1600m and 3200m. In 2009, she achieved a third-place finish at the Footlocker National Championships. However, Sisson did not participate in her final high school track season, choosing instead to prepare for the 2010 IAAF World Cross Country Championships in Bydgoszcz, Poland. Competing in the under-20 race at this event, she finished 18th.

Sisson's achievements in her early career also include several medals at the USATF U20 Outdoor Championships: a gold in the 5000m in 2007, a silver in the 3000m in 2009, and another gold in the 3000m in 2010. Internationally, she secured a bronze in the 5000m at the 2007 Pan American Junior Athletics Championships. At the 2010 World Junior Championships in Athletics, she placed 10th in the 3000m and 6th in the 5000m. Her 5000m time of 15:48.91 set a national record for U.S. high school girls.

=== College ===
Sisson began competing for the University of Wisconsin–Madison in fall 2010. In her first season of cross county, she finished 14th at the 2010 NCAA Division I Cross Country Championships. During the outdoor track season, Sisson ran 15:53.9 to finish 10th in the 5000m of the 2011 NCAA Division I Outdoor Track and Field Championships. She decided to transfer to Providence College in Rhode Island after her freshman year, explaining that her experience at Wisconsin was "not a good fit" and citing the opportunity to train under coach Ray Treacy.

At Providence College, Sisson was a two-time NCAA champion, winning titles in the 5000m at both the indoor and outdoor NCAA Championships in 2015. She also set a collegiate indoor record for the women's 5000m with a time of 15:12.22 at the Big East Indoor Track & Field Championships on 28 February 2015. In cross country, Sisson attained All-American honors at the 2012 and 2013 NCAA Division I Cross Country Championships, finishing 15th and 7th, respectively.

Sisson announced her decision to sign a professional contract with New Balance in June 2015. As a professional athlete, Sisson continued to train under her collegiate coach, Ray Treacy, while pursuing an MBA at Providence College.

=== Professional ===
2015 - 2016

Sisson made her professional racing debut with New Balance at the 2015 USA Outdoor Track and Field Championships, where she participated in the 10000m and finished fifth. On 20 September 2015, she took part in the 5 km Road Running Championships in Providence, Rhode Island, finishing third.

Sisson finished 10th in the 10000m of the 2016 U.S. Olympic Trials. In September 2016, she placed second in both the US 20 km Road Running Championships and the US 5 km Road Running Championships, with Aliphine Tuliamuk taking first place in both races. At the US 10 km Championships on 10 October 2016, Sisson captured her first national title, winning by 44 seconds in front of Sarah Pagano.

==== 2017 - 2018 ====
Sisson debuted in the half marathon on 19 March 2017 at the New York City Half Marathon. She ran 1:08:21 to finish 2nd behind Molly Huddle. Her debut performance ranked among the top five fastest times ever recorded by an American woman in the half marathon. At the 2017 USA Outdoor Track and Field Championships, Sisson placed third in the 10000m, earning a berth to compete in the event at the 2017 World Championships in Athletics. At the world champions, held in London, Sisson ran 31:26.36 to finish in ninth.

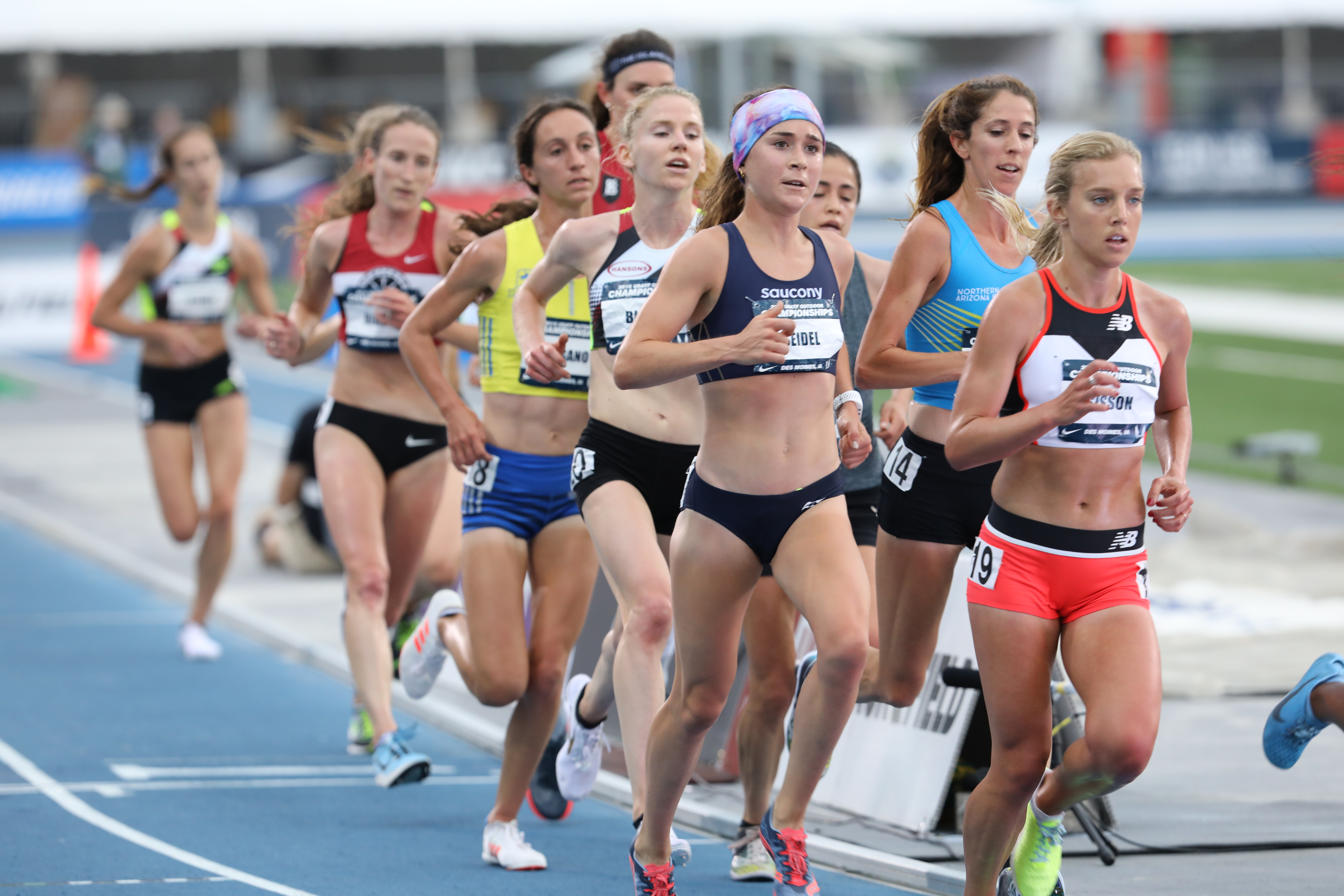
Sisson (right) leading the 10000m at the 2018 USA Outdoor Track and Field Championships

On 21 June 2018, Sisson placed fourth in the 10000m of the 2018 USA Outdoor Track and Field Championships. Later that year, on 3 November 2018, she won the US 5 km Road Running Championships.

==== 2019 - 2020 ====
On 20 Jan 2019, Sisson ran 1:07:30 in the Houston Half Marathon to place fifth. Her time was the second fastest ever by an American woman, coming within 5 seconds of the national record. The following March, Sisson set a personal best of 30:49.57 for 10000m at the Standard Invitational. This performance set a new record for the meet. Prior to this, only two American athletes, Molly Huddle and Shalane Flanagan, had recorded faster times.

Sisson debuted in the marathon on 28 April 2019, finishing sixth at the London Marathon with a time of 2:23:08. This was the second fastest debut time for a marathon by an American, just 8 seconds behind Jordan Hasay's debut record. The following summer, Sisson participated in the 10000m at the 2019 USA Outdoor Track and Field Championships. She came in second, qualifying her to compete at the 2019 World Athletics Championships in Doha, Qatar. At the World Championships, she achieved a 10th place finish with a time of 31:12.56.

Sisson participated in the marathon at the 2020 US Olympic Trials, held in Atlanta on 29 February 2020. She dropped out of the race at mile 22, an outcome that left her "broken hearted". Sisson returned to racing on 6 December 2020, after a hiatus due to the COVID-19 pandemic. She finished fifth in the Valencia Half Marathon, clocking 1:07:26 and missing the American record in the event by one second.

==== 2021 ====
In early 2021, Sisson competed in the 5000m twice. She recorded times of 14:55.82 and 14:53.84, finishing first and fourth in these races, respectively. Her time of 14:53.84 was a personal best. She also won the US 15 km Road Running Championships on 20 March.

The following summer, on 26 June, Sisson competed in the 10000m at the 2020 US Olympic Trials, making a strong comeback after previously having withdrawn from the marathon in the same trials. She won the race, setting a meet record and qualifying for the 2020 Summer Games in Tokyo. In the Olympic final of the 10000m, Sisson finished 10th in 31:09.58.

==== 2022 ====
===== Half-marathon record =====
On 7 May 2022, Sisson broke the American record in the half marathon at the USATF Half Marathon Championships, taking first place in 1:07:11. Her time surpassed Sara Hall's previous record in the event by 4 seconds. She ran the first 10 km in 31:57 and reached 20 km in 1:03:52.

===== Marathon record =====
On 9 October 2022, at the Chicago Marathon, Sisson set a North American record in the marathon. She completed the race in 2:18:29, finishing second to Kenya's Ruth Chepngetich. Sisson reached the halfway point in 69:26 and ran the second half in 69:03. This performance broke Deena Kastor's 16-year-old record by 43 seconds, and it marked the first time an American woman finished under 2:19 in the marathon.

Sisson's Split Times: American Marathon Record
Distance	Time	min/mile
5K	00:16:23	05:17
10K	00:32:54	05:19
15K	00:49:17	05:17
20K	01:05:49	05:20
Half Marathon	01:09:26	05:18
25K	01:22:09	05:15
30K	01:38:37	05:19
35K	01:55:10	05:20
40K	02:11:29	05:15
Finish	02:18:29	05:08

==== 2023 ====
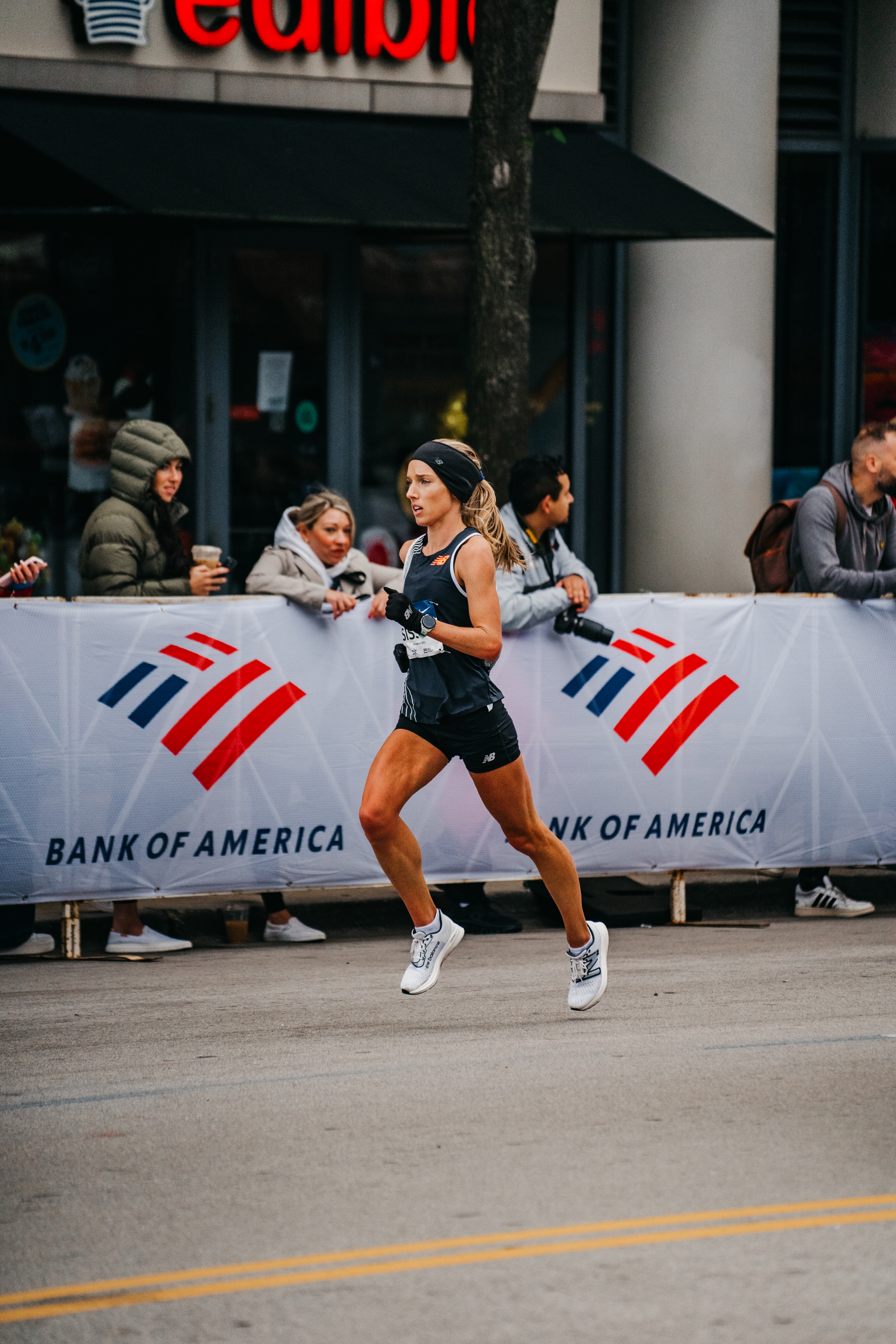
Sisson at the 2023 Chicago Marathon

On 15 January, Sisson ran 1:06:52 in the Houston Half Marathon, bettering her own American record in the event by 19 seconds. She averaged 5:06.1 minutes per mile in the race and finished in second place. Her record would stand until it was broken by Keira D'Amato on 1 July 2023.

Sisson returned to racing on 6 March at the US 20 km Road Running Championships, where she came in first. On 8 October, she competed in the Chicago Marathon. Despite battling a side stitch, she was the top American at the finish, running 2:22:09 for 7th place.

==== 2024 ====
On 3 February 2024, Sisson ran 2:22:42 at the 2024 US Olympic Trials Marathon to place second and earn a spot in the marathon at the 2024 Olympic Games in Paris. She finished as runner up to Fiona O'Keeffe and ahead of Dakotah Lindwurm, both of whom also made the Olympic team. She competed in the 2024 Paris Olympics Women's marathon on 11 August 2024, finishing in 23rd place with a time of 2:29:53.

== Personal life ==
Sisson was born in Milwaukee, Wisconsin. Her father, Mark Sisson, was a runner for the University of Wisconsin–Madison from 1979 to 1983 and a 4:02 miler; her mother was a competitive gymnast. Sisson has three sisters. She holds an MBA from Providence College. On October 6 of 2026 she announced via Instagram that she and her husband Shane Quinn were expecting.

== Achievements ==
All data sourced from World Athletics profile unless otherwise noted.

=== Personal bests ===
Surface	Event	Time	Date	Location	Notes
Indoor track	One mile	4:38.49	February 23, 2013	Boston, MA (USA)	
Indoor track	3000 metres	8:52.60	February 14, 2015	New York, NY (USA)	
Indoor track	Two miles	10:10.21	March 12, 2010	Boston, MA (USA)	
Indoor track	5000 metres	15:02.10	February 26, 2017	Boston, MA (USA)	
Outdoor track	1500 metres	4:40.98	July 30, 2006	Baltimore, MD (USA)	
Outdoor track	One mile	4:44.02	June 12, 2010	New York, NY (USA)	
Outdoor track	3000 metres	8:49.61	July 16, 2018	Cork (IRL)	
Outdoor track	Two miles	10:29.97	June 15, 2007	Greensboro, NC (USA)	
Outdoor track	5000 metres	14:53.84	May 15, 2021	Irvine, CA (USA)	
Outdoor track	10,000 metres	30:49.57	March 29, 2019	Palo Alto, CA (USA)	
Road	5 kilometres	15:38	November 3, 2018	New York, NY (USA)	
Road	10 kilometres	31:47	October 10, 2016	Boston, MA (USA)	
Road	10 miles Road	52:03	November 6, 2016	Pittsburgh, PA (USA)	
Road	Half marathon	1:06:52	January 15, 2023	Houston, TX (USA)	American record
Road	Marathon	2:18:29	October 9, 2022	Chicago, IL (USA)	NACAC record

=== International competition ===
Year	Competition	Venue	Position	Event	Time
Representing USA
2007	Pan American Junior Athletics Championships	São Paulo, Brazil	3rd	5000 m	17.47.81
2009	Pan American Junior Athletics Championships	Port of Spain, Trinidad and Tobago	4th	3000 m	10:17.15
2010	World Junior Championships	Moncton, Canada	10th	3000 m	9:16.80
2010	World Junior Championships	Moncton, Canada	6th	5000 m	15:48.91
2010	World Cross Country Championships	Bydgoszcz, Poland	18th	Junior race	20:08
2017	World Championships	London, United Kingdom	9th	10,000 m	31:26.36
2019	World Championships	Doha, Qatar	10th	10,000 m	31:12.56
2021	Olympic Games	Tokyo, Japan	10th	10,000 m	31:04.46

=== USA National Championships ===
==== Road ====
Year	Competition	Venue	Position	Event	Notes
2014	USA 5 km Championships	Providence, Rhode Island	4th	5 km	15:44
2014	USA 12 km Championships	Alexandria, Virginia	2nd	12 km	38:12
2015	USA 5 km Championships	Providence, Rhode Island	3rd	5 km	15:48
2015	USATF 10 km Championships hosted by Tufts Health Plan 10K for Women	Boston, Massachusetts	2nd	10 km	32:28
2016	USATF 20 km Championships hosted by Faxon Law New Haven Road Race	New Haven, Connecticut	2nd	20 km	1:06:03
2016	USA 5 km Championships	Providence, Rhode Island	2nd	5 km	15:42
2016	USATF 10 km Championships hosted by Tufts Health Plan 10K for Women	Boston, Massachusetts	1st	10 km	31:47
2018	USA 5 km Championships	New York City	1st	5 km	15:38
2023	USA National Championship 15K at Gate River Run	Jacksonville, Florida	1st	15 km	48:28
2024	US Olympic Trials Marathon	Orlando, Florida	2nd	Marathon	2:22:42

==== Outdoor track and field ====
Year	Competition	Venue	Position	Event	Notes
2007	USA Junior Outdoor Track and Field Championships	Indianapolis, Indiana, IUPUI	1st	5000 m	16:48.67
2008	USA Junior Outdoor Track and Field Championships	Jesse Owens Memorial Stadium, Ohio State University, Columbus, Ohio	4th	3000 m	10:01.73
2009	USA Junior Outdoor Track and Field Championships	Eugene, Oregon	2nd	3000 m	9:55.31
2010	USA Junior Cross Country Championships	Spokane, Washington	2nd	Junior race	20:31.5
2010	USA Junior Outdoor Track and Field Championships	Des Moines, Iowa	1st	3000 m	9:18.73
2010	USA Junior Outdoor Track and Field Championships	Des Moines, Iowa	—	5000 m	DNF
2013	2013 USA Outdoor Track and Field Championships	Des Moines, Iowa	6th	10,000 m	33:27.23
2015	2015 USA Outdoor Track and Field Championships	Eugene, Oregon	5th	10,000 m	32:28.73
2016	2016 United States Olympic Trials	Eugene, Oregon	10th	10,000 m	32:54.06
2017	2017 USA Outdoor Track and Field Championships	Sacramento, California	3rd	10,000 m	31:25.64
2018	2018 USA Outdoor Track and Field Championships	Des Moines, Iowa	4th	10,000 m	32:06.31
2019	Stanford Invitational	Palo Alto, California	1st	10,000 m	30:49.57
2019	2019 USA Outdoor Track and Field Championships	Des Moines, Iowa	2nd	10,000 m	32:02.19
2021	2020 United States Olympic Trials	Eugene, Oregon	1st	10,000 m	31:03.82

=== NCAA competition ===
Data from athlete's profile on Track & Field Results Reporting Service.

Year	Competition	Venue	Position	Event	Notes
Representing Wisconsin
2010	Big Ten Conference Cross Country Championships	Madison, Wisconsin	3rd	6 km	20:02.8; All-Big Ten
2010	NCAA Cross Country Championships	Terre Haute, Indiana	14th	6 km	20:28.3
2011	Big Ten Conference Outdoor Track and Field Championships	Iowa City, Iowa	3rd	10,000 m	35:07.35
2011	Big Ten Conference Outdoor Track and Field Championships	Iowa City, Iowa	3rd	5000 m	16:16.06
2011	NCAA Outdoor Track and Field Championships	Des Moines, Iowa	10th	5000 m	15:53.90
Representing Providence College
2011	Big East Conference Cross Country Championships	Louisville, Kentucky	4th	6 km	19:57.4; All-Big East
2012	Big East Conference Indoor Track and Field Championships	New York, New York	5th	Mile	4:49.52
2012	NCAA Indoor Track and Field Championships	Nampa, Idaho	12th	3000 m	9:25.13
2012	Big East Conference Outdoor Track and Field Championships	Tampa, Florida	1st	5000 m	15:45.83
2012	NCAA Outdoor Track and Field Championships	Eugene, Oregon	4th	5000 m	16:18.24
2012	NCAA Cross Country Championships	Louisville, Kentucky	15th	6 km	20:00.1
2013	Big East Conference Indoor Track and Field Championships	Geneva, Ohio	1st	3000 m	9:20.68
2013	Big East Conference Indoor Track and Field Championships	Geneva, Ohio	6th	DMR	11:21.02
2013	NCAA Indoor Track and Field Championships	Fayetteville, Arkansas	9th	5000 m	15:54.73
2013	Big East Outdoor Track and Field Championships	New Brunswick, New Jersey	1st	10,000 m	33:02.88
2013	NCAA Outdoor Track and Field Championships	Eugene, Oregon	6th	5000 m	15:58.40
2013	Big East Conference Cross Country Championships	Somers, Wisconsin	1st	6 km	19:49; All-Big East, meet & course record
2013	NCAA Cross Country Championships	Terre Haute, Indiana	7th	6 km	20:17.5
2014	Big East Indoor Track and Field Championships	New York, New York	2nd	3000 m	9:09.35
2014	Big East Indoor Track and Field Championships	New York, New York	1st	5000 m	16:08.01
2014	NCAA Indoor Track and Field Championships	Albuquerque, New Mexico	8th	5000 m	16:34.18
2015	Big East Indoor Track and Field Championships	New York, New York	1st	5000 m	15:12.22
2015	NCAA Indoor Track and Field Championships	Fayetteville, Arkansas	1st	5000 m	15:32.15
2015	NCAA Indoor Track and Field Championships	Fayetteville, Arkansas	3rd	3000 m	9:01.16
2015	Big East Outdoor Track and Field Championships	Tampa, Florida	1st	5000 m	15:40.64
2015	NCAA Outdoor Track and Field Championships	Eugene, Oregon	1st	5000 m	15:34.10
