= Aliphine Tuliamuk =

American long-distance runner

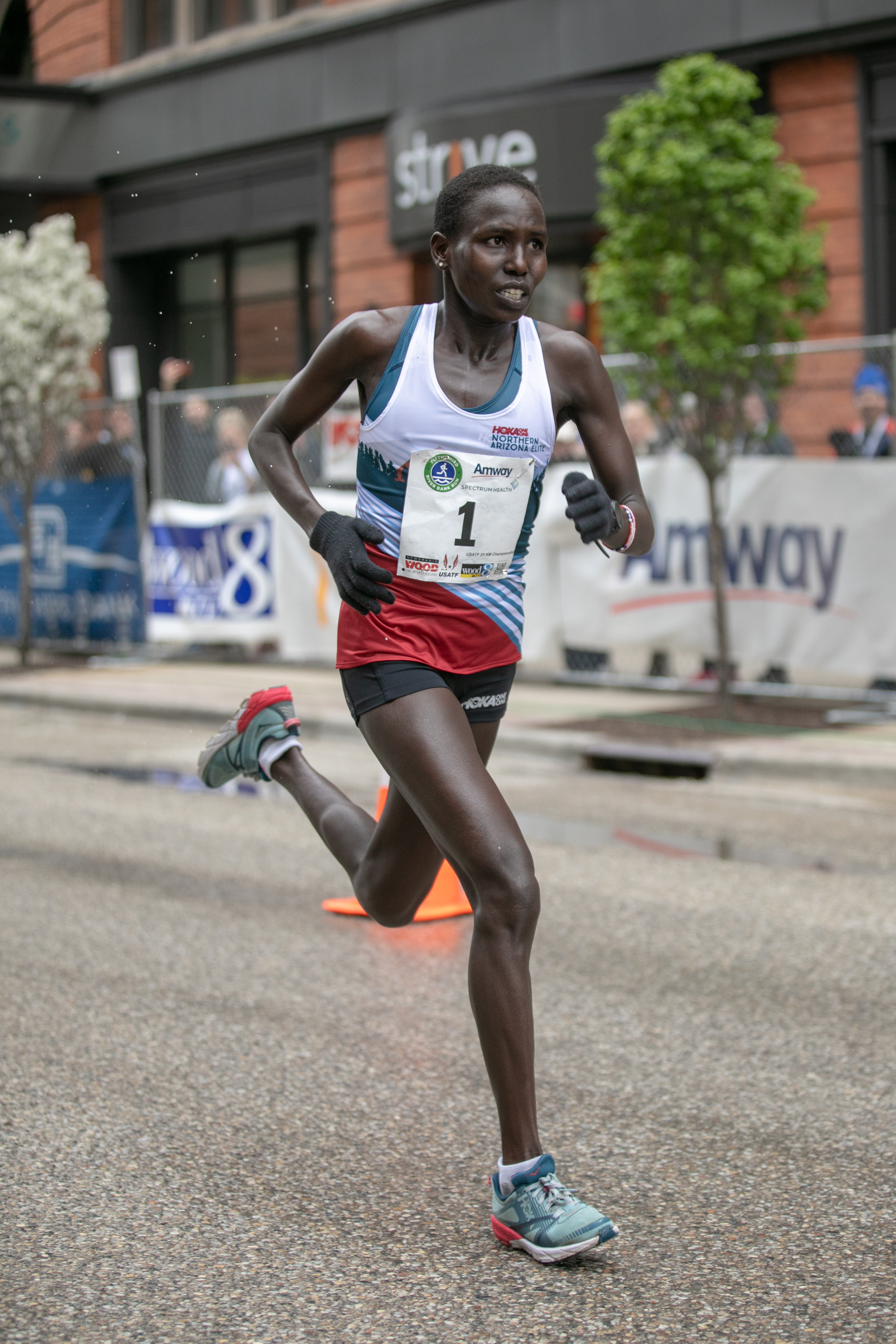
- Tuliamuk in 2018

Personal information
- Nationality: Kenyan-American
- Born: April 5, 1989 (age 37) Posoy, Pokot County, Kenya
- Height: 1.65 m (5 ft 5 in)

Sport
- Country: United States
- Sport: Track and field, Road racing
- Events: 10 km, Half marathon, 25 km, Marathon
- College team: Wichita State Shockers
- Club: Northern Arizona Elite
- Team: Hoka One One
- Turned pro: 2013
- Coached by: Ben Rosario

Achievements and titles
- Personal bests: 5000 m: 15:18.86 (Palo Alto 2013); 10,000 m: 31:54.20 (Palo Alto 2016); 5 km: 15:22 (Providence 2016); 10 km: 31:52 (Boston 2014); Half marathon: 1:09:16 (Santa Fe 2013); Marathon: 2:26:18 (New York City 2022)

Aliphine Chepkerker Tuliamuk (born April 5, 1989) is a Kenyan-born American long-distance runner. She placed first at the 2020 United States Olympic Trials in Atlanta and represented the United States at the 2021 Olympic Games in Tokyo, Japan. Tuliamuk has been a world class athlete since placing 9th in 21:09 at 2005 IAAF World Cross Country Championships – Junior women's race. Tuliamuk ran 33:43 to place 15th at 2017 IAAF World Cross Country Championships. Tuliamuk placed 3rd at 2019 Rotterdam Marathon in 2:26:50.

== NCAA ==
In college, Tuliamuk was an All-American at Wichita State University. Tuliamuk became a First Team NCAA Division I All-American in cross country and in 2013, the first woman from her village to graduate from college, with a major in Public Health.

== Professional ==
In 2013, Tuliamuk set a course record at the Santa Fe Thunder half marathon, with a time of 1:09:16.

In 2016, she won the Fifth Third River Bank Run (functioning as the US 25 km championships) defeating Lindsey Scherf, Clara Santucci, Dorothy McMahan, Gladys Kipsoi, and Chirine Njeim.

She also won the 2016 US 20 km championships defeating Emily Sisson, Brianne Nelson, Lindsey Scherf, Sarah Crouch, and Tara Welling.

For her third national title of the year, she won the 2016 US 5 km championships defeating Emily Sisson, Jordan Hasay, Laura Thweatt, Lindsey Scherf, and Jennifer Rhines.

In 2017, Tuliamuk won 2017 USA Cross Country Championships title defeating Laura Thweatt, Kellyn Taylor, Courtney Frerichs, Sarah Pagano, and Elaina Balouris. Tuliamuk placed 15th at 2017 IAAF World Cross Country Championships – Senior women's race ran 33:43 over 10,000 meters.

As of 2025, Tuliamuk will no longer be part of Northern Arizona Elite or be sponsored by Hoka One One.

Year	Competition	Venue	Position	Event	Notes
USATF Championships and International Races
2016	USATF US 25 km championships Fifth Third River Bank Run	Grand Rapids, Michigan	1st	25,000 meters	1:25:35
2016	USATF US 20 km championships Faxon Law New Haven Road Race	New Haven, Connecticut	1st	20,000 meters	1:05:47
2016	USATF US 5 km championships CVS Health Downtown 5K	Providence, Rhode Island	1st	5,000 meters	15:22
2017	USA Cross Country Championships	Bend, Oregon	1st	10,000 meters	34:23.5
2017	USATF 15K run Championship; Gate River Run	Jacksonville, Florida	6th	15K run	50:11
2017	USATF Half marathon Championship; Columbus Half Marathon	Columbus, Ohio	3rd	Half marathon	1:11:42
2017	USATF 25 km Championship; Fifth Third River Bank Run	Grand Rapids, Michigan	1st	25 km	1:24:35
2017	USATF 10 km Championship; Peachtree Road Race	Atlanta Georgia	1st	10 km	32:49
2017	USATF 7 Mile Championship; Bix 7 Road Race	Davenport, Iowa	1st	7 Mile	36:30
2017	USATF 20 km Championship; Faxon Law New Haven Road Race	New Haven, Connecticut	2nd	20 km	1:07:49
2018	USATF Half marathon Championship; Pittsburgh Half Marathon	Pittsburgh, Pennsylvania	1st	Half marathon	1:10:04
2018	USATF US 25 km championships Fifth Third River Bank Run	Grand Rapids, Michigan	1st	25 km	1:25:35
2018	US 10km road Championships; AJC Peachtree Road Race	Atlanta, Georgia	2nd	10 km	32:29
2019	Houston Half Marathon	Houston Texas	12th	Half marathon	1:12:03
2019	Rotterdam Marathon	Rotterdam, Netherlands	3rd	Marathon	2:26:50
2019	Bolder Boulder	Boulder, Colorado	3rd	10 km	33:00
2020	Houston Half Marathon	Houston Texas	19th	Half marathon	1:09:49
2020	2020 United States Olympic Trials	Atlanta, Georgia	1st	Marathon	2:27:23
2021	2020 Summer Olympics	Sapporo, Japan	DNF	Marathon	N/A
2022	2022 New York City Marathon	New York City, New York	7th	Marathon	2:26:18
