= Keira D'Amato =

American runner (born 1984)

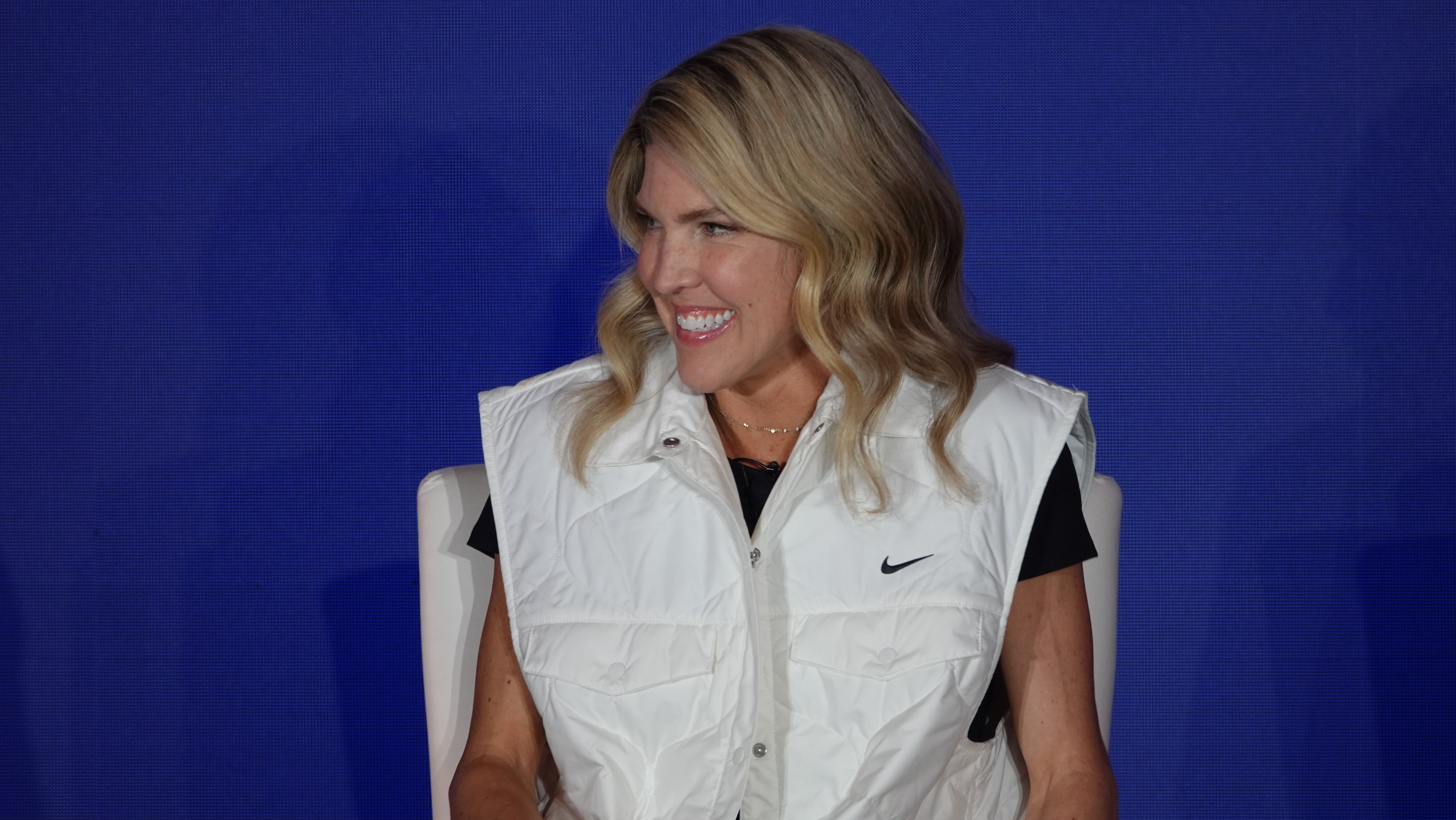
- D'Amato at a media event in 2024

Personal information
- Born: October 21, 1984 (age 42) Oakton, Virginia, U.S.
- Education: American University
- Employer: Nike

Sport
- Country: United States
- Sport: Athletics
- Turned pro: 2021

Achievements and titles
- Personal bests: 5 km: 15:08 (Memphis, TN 2020); 10 km: 31:17 (Boston, MA 2022); 10 miles: 51:23 (Washington, D.C. 2020); Half marathon: 1:06:37 (Gold Coast half marathon, Australia July 1, 2023); Marathon: 2:19:12 (Houston, TX 2022)

Keira D'Amato (born Keira Carlstrom on October 21, 1984) is an American distance runner. She is the American half marathon record holder with a time of 1:06:39 at the 2023 Gold Coast Half Marathon on July 1, 2023. She held the American women's record in the marathon with her time of 2:19:12 at the 2022 Houston Marathon, until Emily Sisson set a new record time on October 9, 2022. She was the world best holder for the women's-only 10-mile distance and a three-time USA Track & Field national champion.

== Biography ==
D'Amato ran for American University from 2002 to 2006, where she was a four-time All-American and 11-time Patriot League champion, competing in cross-country, indoor track, and outdoor track. She was also named an Academic All-American in 2006.

After a series of injuries in her post-collegiate career, D'Amato took a hiatus from the sport in 2009. She became involved in cycling and adult soccer, and worked as marketing director for a local Virginia running store chain. In 2016, she made her return to competitive running, and began to compete in the marathon. She ran a marathon with her husband in 2017, completing the course in 3:14:54. At the 2017 Richmond Marathon later that year, she cut her time down to 2:47:00. With a time of 2:34:55 at the 2019 Berlin Marathon, she qualified for the 2020 US Olympic Women's Marathon Trials, where she finished 15th with a then-personal best of 2:34:24.

In November 2020, D'Amato set the American record for the 10-mile women's-only race in 51:23, breaking the previous record set in 2014 by Janet Cherobon-Bawcom. Following further success at multiple distances that year, she signed a sponsorship deal with Nike in February 2021. On January 16, 2022, she ran the American women's record in the marathon at the Houston Marathon, finishing in 2:19:12 and taking 24 seconds off the previous American record set by Deena Kastor in 2006.

With two weeks' notice before the 2022 World Athletics Championships, D'Amato was called up from the alternate position to represent the United States for the first time. She finished eighth in the event with a time of 2:23:34 in a historic showing for the United States, which saw all three American women finish in the Top 8.

D'Amato holds three USATF National Titles: the 2021 Women's Half Marathon title, with a time of 1:07:55; the 2022 Women's 6K title, with a time of 17:52 and a new course record in Canton, Ohio; and the 2022 Women's 20k title, with a time of 1:04:29 and a new course record in New Haven, Connecticut.

On July 1, 2023, she set a new American record for the women's half marathon, by running the Gold Coast Half Marathon in Australia in 1:06:39.

=== Personal life ===
Outside of professional running, D'Amato also holds a career in real estate. In 2022, she opened her own running store in the greater Richmond, Virginia area, where she resides with her husband and two children. On her return to competitive running, D'Amato stated, "I feel like I have nothing to lose. I have another life outside of this, which is very important to me. And I feel that gives me a lot of freedom to take risks and not be afraid of failing. ... Everything that I wish I would have [done in round 1], I'm now doing it in the second phase. I'm taking it really seriously, but I also am having more fun than I’ve ever had in my whole life."
