= Gate River Run =

Annual footrace in Jacksonville, Florida, United States

- Gate River Run logo
- Date: the first Saturday of March
- Location: downtown Jacksonville, Florida
- Event type: Road race
- Distance: 15 kilometer
- Primary sponsor: Gate Petroleum
- Established: 1978
- Edition: 48th
- Course records: Men: 42:10 (2025); Wesley Kiptoo; Women: 47:03 (2014); Shalane Flanagan
- Website: www.gate-riverrun.com/
- Participants: 13,856 (2025); 15,569 (2013) Record

The Gate River Run (GRR), formerly known as the River Run 15,000, is an annual 15-kilometre (9.3 mi) road running event in Jacksonville, Florida, United States, that attracts both competitive and recreational runners. It has functioned as the US National Championship 15K since 1994, and in 2007 became the largest 15K race in the country. It "was voted [as] one of the top US Road Races for last 20 years by Runner's World Magazine." Local news media describe it as "one of Jacksonville's premiere annual events." The 2027 event will be the 50th annual race.

== History ==
The race was established by the Jacksonville Track Club (now JTC Running) in 1978 when it was known as the River Run 15,000. The initial sponsor of the race was the Florida Publishing Company, which published the Florida Times-Union and Jacksonville Journal. An inspiration for the race was the Peachtree Road Race, a 10,000 meter road race sponsored for several years by the Atlanta Journal-Constitution. An initial planning meeting was held at the Jacksonville YMCA, with representatives of the Y, the newspapers and members of the Jacksonville Track Club. The 15,000-meter distance was proposed, to distinguish the race from the Atlanta race and the plethora of 10K road races then spreading across the country as a result of the running boom. The course crosses two major bridges spanning the St. Johns River, giving the race its name.

Running legend Bill Rodgers, who is a four-time winner of both the New York City and Boston Marathons, won the first River Run. He was invited by the organizers, pending an appearance fee of $1,000, which was an under-the-table payment because of the amateur status of so many world-class athletes at that time. There was no other appearance or prize money offered. Rodgers' powerful victory helped catapult the event into the national running consciousness. On the women's side, Kim Merritt, a national-class runner in a period when women were first beginning to be taken seriously at longer distances, took home the distaff honors.

Gate Petroleum became the underwriting sponsor in 1994. Todd Williams holds the American 15K record with a time of 42:22 at the 1995 GRR, which he won five times. Shalane Flanagan, won in 2014 and set the new women's record with 47:00. Before that, Deena Drossin, who has won the GRR six times, held the women's record with 47:15 at the GRR in 2003.

An equalizer was added in 2004. The difference in time between the women's and men's 15K national records was 4:53, so the elite women runners got a five-minute head start on the elite men. The first finisher, man or woman, receives a $5,000 bonus. Even so, the women had only won the prize once (in 2007). In 2012, the equalizer was increased to 6:35, and Janet Cherobon won the $5,000 bonus that year and in 2013.

In 2025, the race did not host the USATF 15K Championship as the USA Half Marathon Championships was held the following day in Atlanta and served as a selection event for the 2025 World Athletics Road Running Championships held in San Diego. This was the first time the race did not hold a USATF championship since 1993, but plans to return as the USATF 15K championship in the future. Due to this change, for 2025, the race joined the PRRO Circuit and the top prize was open to runners of all countries, not just USATF/Americans as in the past. The winners would receive $7,000 with a total $20,500 of prize money for each sex as the top 10 would receive prize money. There was also an American Cup, where the top 5 Americans of each sex would receive prize money with $8,000 available for each sex and $3,000 for the top Americans. As a result of these changes, the field was more of an international competition with many of the top runners residing outside the United States. On March 1, a cooler weather day than years past at 51F at the race start, Wesley Kiptoo of Kenya and Calli Hauger-Thackery of Great Britain won the Gate River Run. Kiptoo's time of 42:10 was a course record and he won $15,000 for winning, breaking the course record and also winning the equalizer (finishing 5 minutes of ahead of the female winner).

== Race details ==
In 2013, total prize money exceeded $85,000, including bonus money for record-breaking performances. The event has more prize money than any major non-marathon event in the United States. There are separate but equal awards for men and women individuals, teams and masters (over 40).

Individual Awards
1st	2nd	3rd	4th	5th	6th	7th	8th	9th	10th
$12,000	$5,000	$3,000	$2,000	$1,000	$900	$800	$700	$600	$500

Team Awards
1st	2nd	3rd
$6,000	$3,000	$1,000

Masters Awards
1st	2nd	3rd
$1,000	$500	$250

Bonus Awards
$5,000	Equalizer	First male or female finisher
$10,000	World Record	Race winner
$5,000	American Record	Race winner
$3,000	Course Record	Race winner
$200	Florida Cup	Fastest male & female resident of Florida
$100	First Coast Cup	Fastest male & female resident Duval, Clay, Nassau or St. Johns

Live bands perform at locations along the racecourse and the start and finish lines are on Gator Bowl Boulevard. Special running caps are given to the top 10 percent of racers and medals are given to all 15K finishers.

The Greater Jacksonville Agricultural Fair sold their downtown property in February 2025, so the fairgrounds were unavailable for the GRR and preliminary events. In 2025, the 3-day runner's expo was moved from the fairgrounds to Daily's Place. The expo has dozens of vendor representatives promoting running and health-related products. Seminars with running themes are presented; typical topics are: hydration and nutrition, foot and ankle injuries, shin splits and shoe fitting, basic injury care. Bill Rodgers was a special guest at the expo in 2013, talking about running and signing autographs.

Following the race, Publix supermarkets host a celebration at Metropolitan Park instead of the fairgrounds.

In 2013, 17,454 people registered for the race, with 15,569 runners actually completing it. The winner was Ben True from Hanover, New Hampshire with a time of 43:38. The fastest woman in 2013 was Janet Cherobon-Bawcom, from Rome, Georgia at 49:44. The related races, the Florida Times-Union 5K Run & Walk for Charity, and the one-mile Junior River Run had 2,041 and 1,873 participants, respectively.

Doug Alred, who has served as race director for 31 of the 36 years of the race, said that 2013 was the 11th consecutive year of record entries.

=== Streakers ===
Upon completion of the 2021 race, there were 26 Streakers, defined as an individual who has completed every River Run. During the 2013 race, one of the Streakers collapsed with a heart attack, but was given CPR by firefighters who were also running the race, and was revived with a defibrillator from a quickly responding emergency unit.

=== Hall of Fame ===
The Gate River Run Hall of Fame was established in 2002 and is permanently located in the Riverplace Tower, on the southbank in downtown Jacksonville. Memorabilia dating from the race's inception in 1978 up to the present is on display and a five-minute video gives visitors an overview of the race. Plaques for each of the 14 persons inducted into the HOF are on display.

== Past winners ==
Key: Course record

Year	Men's winner	Time (m:s)	Women's winner	Time (m:s)
1978	Bill Rodgers (USA)	44:46	Kim Merritt (USA)	55:46
1979	Jerry Odlin (GBR)	46:04	Joan Benoit (USA)	51:47
1980	Bob Hodge (USA)	44:54	Jennifer White (USA)	53:11
1981	Dan Dillon (USA)	43:34	Patti Catalano (USA)	49:33
1982	Mike Musyoki (KEN)	43:33	Wendy Sly (GBR)	49:52
1983	Nick Rose (GBR)	43:42	Charlotte Teske (GER)	50:17
1984	Gidamis Shahanga (TAN)	42:54	Midde Hamrin (SWE)	50:12
1985	Simeon Kigen (KEN)	43:26	Betty Springs (USA)	49:25
1986	Arturo Barrios (MEX)	43:18	Grete Waitz (NOR)	48:53
1987	Arturo Barrios (MEX)	43:00	Grete Waitz (NOR)	49:05
1988	Steve Spence (USA)	43:20	Lynn Jennings (USA)	50:02
1989	John Halvorsen (NOR)	43:12	Cathy O'Brien (USA)	49:45
1990	Ed Eyestone (USA)	43:58	Francie Larue Smith (USA)	49:39
1991	Steve Spence (USA)	43:41	Francie Larue Smith (USA)	48:43
1992	Valdenor dos Santos (BRA)	43:42	Olga Markova (RUS)	49:20
1993	Benson Masya (KEN)	43:59	Gwyn Coogan (USA)	51:26
1994	Todd Williams (USA)	43:42	Anne Marie Letko (USA)	49:27
1995	Todd Williams (USA)	42:22	Cathy O'Brien (USA)	48:56
1996	Todd Williams (USA)	43:49	Lynn Jennings (USA)	49:45
1997	Joe LeMay (USA)	43:35	Lynn Jennings (USA)	50:13
1998	Todd Williams (USA)	44:06	Jennifer Rhines (USA)	51:00
1999	Todd Williams (USA)	43:59	Lynn Jennings (USA)	50:05
2000	Dan Browne (USA)	44:26	Deena Drossin (USA)	49:40
2001	Meb Keflezighi (USA)	43:16	Deena Drossin (USA)	49:09
2002	Meb Keflezighi (USA)	42:49	Deena Drossin (USA)	48:12
2003	Meb Keflezighi (USA)	43:31	Deena Drossin (USA)	47:15
2004	Meb Keflezighi (USA)	43:18	Colleen De Reuck (USA)	49:02
2005	Ryan Shay (USA)	43:50	Jennifer Rhines (USA)	49:21
2006	Meb Keflezighi (USA)	43:41	Blake Russell (USA)	49:14
2007	Meb Keflezighi (USA)	43:39	Deena Kastor (USA)	47:20
2008	Andrew Carlson (USA)	44:10	Deena Kastor (USA)	49:34
2009	Anthony Famiglietti (USA)	43:36	Amy Yoder-Begley (USA)	49:51
2010	Mo Trafeh (USA)	42:58	Katie McGregor (USA)	49:51
2011	Mo Trafeh (USA)	42:58	Jennifer Rhines (USA)	49:31
2012	Christo Landry (USA)	44:37	Janet Cherobon (USA)	49:41
2013	Ben True (USA)	43:38	Janet Cherobon (USA)	49:44
2014	Ben True (USA)	43:04	Shalane Flanagan (USA)	47:00 NR
2015	Ben True (USA)	44:03	Amy Cragg (USA)	50:18
2016	Stanley Kebenei (USA)	44:37	Tara Welling (USA)	50:34
2017	Leonard Korir (USA)	43:22	Jordan Hasay (USA)	49:28
2018	Leonard Korir (USA)	43:06	Molly Huddle (USA)	47:50
2019	Shadrack Kipchirchir (USA)	43:41	Erika Kemp (USA)	50:54
2020	Frank Lara (USA)	44:42	Marielle Hall (USA)	48:52
2021	Clayton Young (USA)	43:52	Emily Sisson (USA)	48.09
2022	Nico Montanez (USA)	43:09	Emily Sisson (USA)	47:28
2023	Hillary Bor (USA)	43:11	Emily Sisson (USA)	48:26
2024	Teshome Asfaha Mekonen (USA)	42:51	Rachel Smith (USA)	48:26
2025	Wesley Kiptoo (KEN)	42:10 NR	Calli Hauger-Thackery (GBR)	47:24
2026	Mohammed El Youssfi (MAR)	43:26	Chloe Herbiet (BEL)	47:58
