= Greg Meyer =

American long-distance runner

Greg Meyer (born September 18, 1955) is an American long-distance runner. Meyer's winning time for the 1983 Boston Marathon race was 2:09.00. He was the last American to win the Boston Marathon until 2014, and the last person born in America to win the Chicago Marathon until 2017. He set ten American road racing records and two world records, and won the River Bank Run, in his home town of Grand Rapids, seven times. He was inducted to the National Polish-American Sports Hall of Fame in 2024.

== Personal life ==
Meyer was born in Grand Rapids, Michigan to parents Rita and Jay. He has one older sibling, Matthew Meyer. Meyer is a 1973 graduate of Grand Rapids West Catholic High School. In 1977 he earned a degree in education and social studies from the University of Michigan. In 1986 he earned a Master of Education degree from Boston University. He met and married fellow runner Paula Lettis in 1980 while living in Boston and together they had three children, Nicolle (1981), Jacob (1983) and Daniel (1986). Meyer and Lettis divorced in 2005 while living in Dexter. Meyer remarried in May 2019. He and his wife Kerry reside near Rockford.

== Career ==
Greg was employed from approximately 2000 through 2008 by the University of Michigan as director of Major Gifts for the Greater Michigan Region, where he helped raise over $125 million for the university. From 2008 to 2012 Meyer served as Associate Vice President for Institutional Advancement at Aquinas College. In Fall of 2012, he became the VP & Executive Director of the Aquinas Foundation. After his time at Aquinas, he served as the VP of Development and Communication for the YMCA of Greater Grand Rapids from 2015 to 2018. In October 2018, Greg joined University of Michigan Health - West as their Chief Community Officer.

== Running accomplishments ==
Meyer set American road racing records in the 8K, the 10K, and the 15K. He set world records in the 10-mile run and the 25K. He was the first University of Michigan runner to break the four-minute mile mark. In 1978, Meyer won the U.S. Amateur Athletic Union's cross country running title, in 29:35.9, narrowly edging out Alberto Salazar. The U.S. boycotted the 1980 Summer Olympics, and Meyer finished 7th in the 1984 Trials. Meyer's winning time for the 1983 Boston Marathon race was 2:09.00. He was the last American to win the Boston Marathon until 2014, and the last person born in America to win the Chicago Marathon until 2017. He set ten American road racing records and two world records, and won the River Bank Run, in his home town of Grand Rapids, seven times. Meyer was inducted into the U of M Athletic Hall of Honor and was inducted into the Michigan Sports Hall of Fame in 2011.

Year	Competition	Venue	Position	Event	Notes
Representing the United States
1980	Detroit Marathon	Detroit, United States	1st	Marathon	2:13:07 CR
1981	Boston Marathon	Boston, United States	11th	Marathon	2:13:08
1982	Chicago Marathon	Chicago, United States	1st	Marathon	2:10:59
1983	Boston Marathon	Boston, United States	1st	Marathon	2:09:00
1984	U.S. Olympic Trials	Buffalo, NY, United States	7th	Marathon	2:13:29

== See also ==
- List of winners of the Boston Marathon
