= Bill Reifsnyder =

American long-distance runner

William P. Reifsnyder (born April 13, 1962, in Williamsport, Pennsylvania) is a retired American long-distance runner, who twice (1989 and 1991) won the American national title in the men's marathon race. In 1991 he was ranked the second road racer in the world by "Runner's World" magazine. In 1985 he finished in second place in the Honolulu Marathon, clocking 2:14:39 behind Kenya's Ibrahim Hussein (2:12:08). While at Bucknell University, Reifsnyder was a three-time All-American in cross country.
