= Nike Sport Research Lab =

Research and development institute

Coordinates: 45.506903°N 122.828479°W

- Established: 1980; 45 years ago
- Research type: Sports equipment, sportswear
- Location: Beaverton, Oregon, USA
- Operating agency: Nike, Inc.
- Website: about.nike.com

The Nike Sport Research Lab is a research and development institute located in Beaverton in the U.S. state of Oregon. Opened in 1980, the lab is owned by American apparel and footwear maker Nike. Commercials for the facility have featured famous NBA and PGA athletes talking positively about the products and the research behind them.

== Details ==
The first Nike lab opened in 1980 in Exeter, New Hampshire. The 16,000-square-foot (1,500 m^{2}) Sport Research Lab is located in the Mia Hamm building at the company's headquarters in Beaverton, Oregon. The Nike campus spans a total of 213 acres (9,300,000 sq ft) on the west side of the Portland metropolitan area. They deal with creating new footwear from athletic endeavors like track and field, golf, and basketball. Equipment at the lab include a mannequin constructed of copper, motion capture rooms, and environmental chambers, among others. The lab's facilities are also known as "the Kitchen" and "the Oven" (for most of their professional golf equipment). Nike Golf operates The Oven in Fort Worth, Texas, for developing golf clubs, while The Oven West in Oregon develops balls. Massotherapists are also employed within the facility.
