= Jordan Hasay =

American long-distance runner

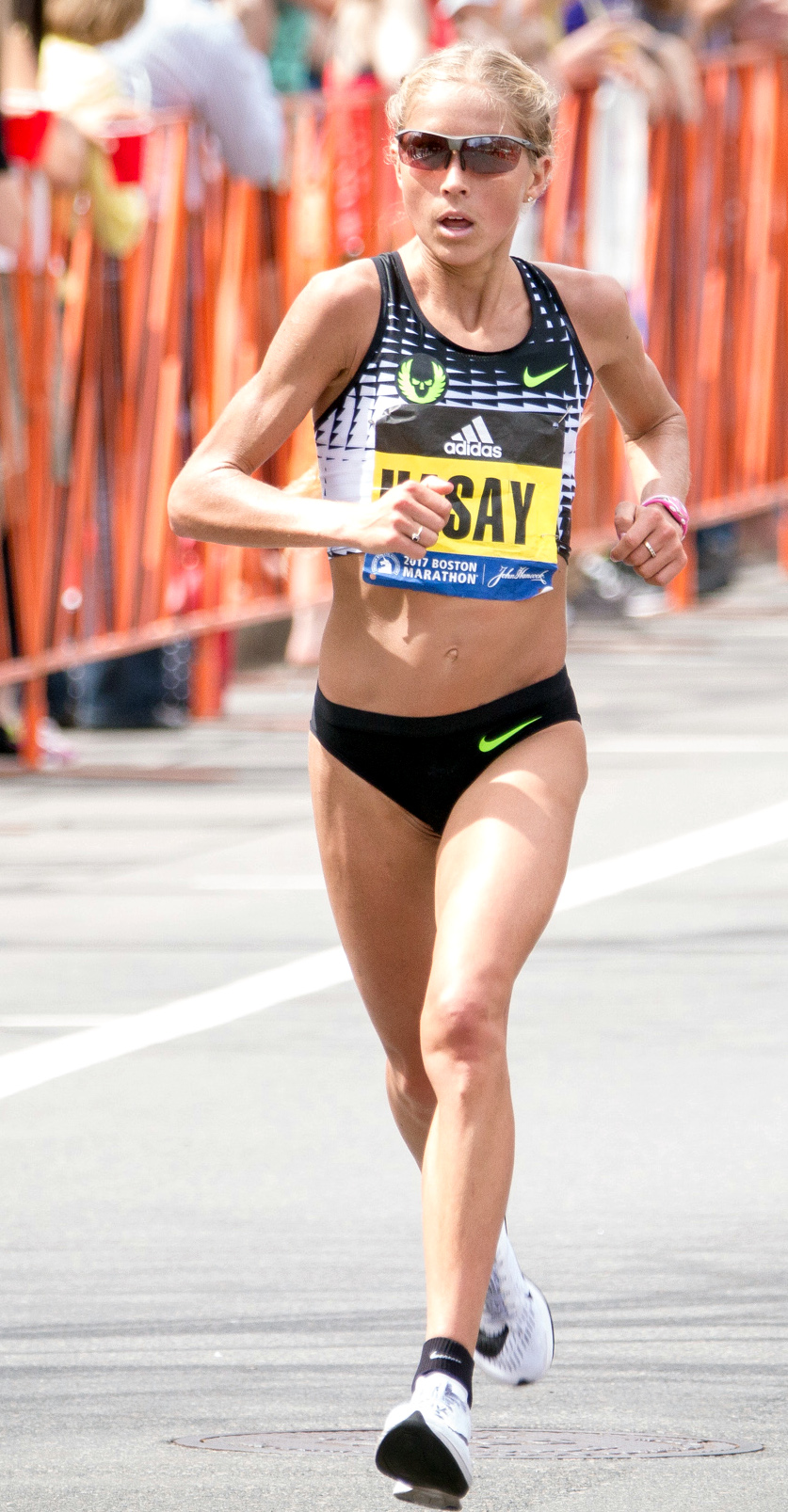
- Hasay at mile 24.5 in the 2017 Boston Marathon

Personal information
- Full name: Jordan Melissa Hogan (née Hasay)
- Nationality: American
- Born: September 21, 1991 (age 35) Fontana, California, U.S.
- Height: 5 ft 4 in (1.63 m)

Sport
- Sport: Track & Field
- College team: University of Oregon

Achievements and titles
- World finals: 2013 Moscow; 10,000 m - 12th
- Personal bests: Outdoor; 1500 m: 4:07.70 (Glasgow 2014); Mile: 4:42.21 (Folsom 2006); 3000 m: 8:46.89 (London 2013); 2-Mile: 9:35.05 (Eugene 2014); 5000 m: 15:28.56 (Portland 2014); 10,000 m: 31:39.67 (Palo Alto 2014); Indoor; 1000 m: 2:41.08 i OT (Seattle 2015); Mile: 4:28.27 i (New York 2015); 3000 m: 8:50.21 i (Birmingham 2015); 2-Mile: 9:36.00 i (Boston 2014); 5000 m: 15:40.30 i (Fayetteville 2013); Road; 5 km: 15:25 (Providence 2014); 10 km: 31:39 (Boston 2014); Half marathon: 1:07:55 (Prague 2017); Marathon: 2:20:57 (Chicago 2017)
Medal record
Women's Athletics
Representing United States
World Youth Championships
| Silver medal – second place | 2007 Ostrava | 1500 m |
NACAC Under-23 Championships
| Gold medal – first place | 2012 Irapuato | 1500 m |
Pan American Junior Championships
| Gold medal – first place | 2009 Port of Spain | 1500 m |
World Marathon Majors
| Bronze medal – third place | 2017 Boston | Marathon |
| Bronze medal – third place | 2017 Chicago | Marathon |
| Bronze medal – third place | 2019 Boston | Marathon |
- Updated on October 8, 2017

Jordan Melissa Hogan (née Hasay) (born September 21, 1991) is an American distance runner. She attended Mission College Preparatory High School in San Luis Obispo and was unanimously selected 2008 Girls High School Athlete of the Year by the voting panel at Track and Field News. In March 2009, she became the ninth high school athlete and third woman on the cover of Track and Field News magazine.

Hogan attended the University of Oregon, where she studied business administration and competed on the cross country and track and field teams earning 18 All-American honors, 2011 Mile and 3,000 meters NCAA titles. She finished third in the 2017 Chicago Marathon, 2017 Boston Marathon, and 2019 Boston Marathon.

== Personal life ==
Her father was a high school basketball star in Pennsylvania, and her mother was a national level swimmer in her native England.

In 2023, Jordan married and moved to Mechanicsburg, Pennsylvania, starting a coaching and consulting business.

== Career ==
=== Before high school ===
Before entering high school, Hasay twice set the USATF Junior Olympics Youth record in the 1500 meter run, first setting the record in 2004 with a time of 4:34.02 and setting it again in 2005 with a time of 4:28.61. She also twice set the USATF Junior Olympics Youth record in the 3000 meter run, first setting the record in 2004 with a time of 9:48.77 and setting it again in 2005 with a time of 9:35.12.

She went to St. Patricks Catholic School, and she ran in the San Luis Distance Club youth program, where she was coached by Jim Barodte.

=== High school ===
==== Freshman year ====
Hasay attended Mission College Preparatory Catholic High School, a private Roman Catholic high school in San Luis Obispo, California. She set the all-time freshman record at the 2005 Mt. SAC Cross Country Invitational. Hasay won the 2005 Foot Locker Cross Country Championships race with a time of 17:05 over five kilometers, being the second freshman to win this race and with the fastest winning time since 2001. She won the 3200 meter race at the 2006 CIF California State Meet with a time of 10:13.55 and won the mile race at the 2006 Golden West Invitational with a time of 4:42.21, just 0.21 seconds off the high school freshman mile record of 4:42.0 set by Mary Decker in 1973. She also won the 3000 meter race at the 2006 USATF Junior (19-and-under) Championship Track & Field Meet with a time of 9:50.66. Normally, the winner of this race would have qualified to represent the U.S. at the 2006 World Junior Championship Track & Field Meet in Beijing, China, but at age 14, Hasay was too young according to the rules of the International Association of Athletics Federations.

Hasay lost just two races in her freshman year: her first cross country race in the fall of 2005 when she did not finish, and the Nike Outdoor Nationals mile, where she placed third with a time of 4:42.27, three seconds behind junior Danielle Tauro. She was selected by Track & Field News magazine as the third best high school miler, second best high school two-miler, and the seventeenth best overall girls high school track and field athlete in the U.S. for 2006.

==== Sophomore year ====
Hasay won the 2007 USATF Junior Cross Country Championship race in a time of 21:44 over six kilometers, leading from the beginning and winning by 14 seconds. She qualified to represent the US at the 2007 World Cross Country Championships in Mombasa, Kenya on March 24, but because of a terrorism warning at the meet, she did not participate.

Hasay set the age 15 and national high school sophomore class records in the 3200m in her first race on the track in 2007 with a time of 10:04.52, the fastest high school time since 2004. She won the 3200 meter race at the 2007 CIF California State Meet in a time of 10:06.76 and won the mile race at the 2007 Golden West Invitational in a time of 4:43.34. Hasay also won the 1500 meter race at the 2007 USATF Junior Championship Track & Field Meet in a meet record time of 4:16.98. This was the fourth fastest HS 1500 of all time, the fastest ever by a US 15-year-old, fastest ever by a sophomore (eclipsed on June 1, 2012 by Mary Cain's 4:16.52), and the fastest HS time in 25 years. She received a silver medal in her first international championships, running a 4:17.24 in the 1500 meters at the 5th IAAF World Youth Championships in Ostrava, Czech Republic, finishing behind the 4:15.47 run by Sammary Cherotich of Kenya.

Hasay was selected by Track and Field News magazine as both the best high school miler and two-miler in 2007 (the first girls mile/2-mile double winner since Julia Stamps in 1997), and also the 5th best overall (and top sophomore) girls high school track and field athlete in the United States for 2007.

==== Junior year ====
Hasay won the USATF Cross Country Championships Junior Women's 6K on February 16, 2008 in 20 minutes, 32 seconds at Mission Bay Park in San Diego.

Hasay's determination to win was illustrated in the All Star meeting between her and Christine Babcock at the 2008 Arcadia Invitational. In the 3200, both runners would not concede, turning the race into a rare home stretch sprint challenge for Hasay. As a traditional frontrunner, this was not thought to be Hasay's strength, but she held off Babcock to win. This race served as a precursor for the challenge in the CIF State meet Finals.

At the 2008 CIF California State Meet on May 31, Hasay held off Davis Senior High School senior Laurynne Chetelat down the home stretch to win her third consecutive 3200 state title in a meet record of 9:52.13, the second fastest 3200 time run by a high school girl ever (only behind Kim Mortensen's National Record) and the first (along with Chetelat) under 10 minutes since Caitlin Chock in 2004. She successfully defended her national junior 1500m title on June 22.

After having finished her junior year in June, the 16-year-old Hasay postponed her departure for the World IAAF Junior Championships in order to compete in the Olympic Trials and to attempt to lower the high school 1500 record. On July 2, she ran the quarterfinals at the University of Oregon's Hayward Field, in Eugene, advancing to the semifinals. On July 4, she came from behind in the stretch, breaking the national high school record for 1500m and qualifying her for the Trials finals. As she finished, thousands of spectators in the partisan crowd chanted, "Go to Oregon." Her time of 4:14.50 bested the previous mark, held by Christine Babcock, by 1.92 seconds. Hasay's time was also the record for the combined all-time (converted) US high school 1500/1600/mile events, as maintained by Track & Field News.

Hasay closed out her 2008 track season on July 13 in Bydgoszcz, Poland by finishing fourth in the 1500m at the IAAF World Junior Championships in a time of 4:19.02. This finish was the best ever for a U.S. girl in the World Juniors women's 1500m.

Hasay was named the 2008 USA Track and Field's Youth Athlete of the Year on October 21. On October 23, Track & Field News announced that their voting panel unanimously selected Hasay the 2008 Girls High School Athlete of the Year.

==== Senior year ====
Hasay's senior year cross country season included her fourth straight California high school Division V win, making her the second athlete in California state history, after Sara Hall (née Bei), to win four state titles. (A third female, Sarah Baxter of Simi Valley High School, has since also won four California state cross country titles.) Hasay then went on to win her fourth straight Foot Locker West Regional title, becoming the first athlete in the history of the Foot Locker National meet to win a regional title four times. Finally, she won the national Foot Locker Cross Country Championships for the second time, in a time of 17:22. This win makes her the sixth runner to win this prestigious meet twice, and the only athlete to win the meet in non-consecutive years. She decided not to defend her USA Cross Country Championships Junior Women's 6K title.

Hasay won Arcadia Invitational, CIF SS, CIF Masters, CIF State titles in track and field. Hasay won the two-mile at the 2009 Nike Indoor Nationals with a time 10:10.89, making her the sixth fastest U.S. high school performer of all time in her first indoor race. Hasay was named the 2008-9 MaxPreps Female Athletes of the Year.

In February 2009, Hasay committed to the Oregon Ducks over many other prestigious programs.

=== High school personal bests ===
| Distance | Time | Date | All-time U.S. HS Rank |
|---|---|---|---|
| 800 meters | 2:09.64 | May 23, 2009 | n/a |
| 1,500 meters | 4:14.50 | July 4, 2008 | 4 |
| 1,600 meters | 4:39.13 | March 31, 2007 | 5 |
| One mile | 4:42.21 | June 11, 2006 | n/a |
| 3,000 meters | 9:19.6 | May 31, 2008 | 8 |
| 3,200 meters | 9:52.13 | May 31, 2008 | 2 |
| Two miles | 10:07.65 | April 7, 2007 | 7 |

=== Collegiate ===
==== Freshman year ====
Hasay did not disappoint in her Oregon debut, taking sixth at the Bill Dellinger Invitational in 16:39.71 for a 5000m, where she was the top freshman in the race which helped her team to a second-place finish. She was the top Duck, and third overall, at the Pre-National Invitational, covering the 6000m LaVern Gibson Championship Course in 20:33. She had a strong performance at the Pac-10 Championships where she finished third, as the top freshman. She took second in the NCAA West Regional. She was the Ducks' top runner at the NCAA Cross Country Championships, where she placed 18th to claim her first All-American Award. She was awarded Pac-10 Newcomer of the Year.

She opened her indoor season by running the lead leg of Oregon's relay team at the Texas A&M Challenge. She came back next day to win the mile in 4:38.48. Two weeks later, she won the 3000m at the Husky Classic in a time that was fourth-all time at Oregon. She helped lead Oregon to its first-ever MPSF crown by winning the mile in 4:35.01. This time was an NCAA automatic qualifier and was .02 seconds shy of the school record. She was a key point scorer at her first NCAA Indoor Championships where she placed fourth in the mile and ran the anchor leg on the Ducks' runner-up DMR team. This led Oregon to win the Indoor title for the first time in school history. The DMR time at this meet (10:58.96) was a school record and only the second time Oregon women had run under 11:00.

Hasay's collegiate outdoor debut was a memorable one as she won the featured section of the 1500m at the Stanford Invitational in 4:14.67, which was less than a quarter of a second off her PR, as well as the junior national high school record, that she set at the 2008 Olympic Trials. In her Hayward Field debut as a Duck, she won the 5000m to help Oregon win the Pepsi Team Invitational. She led off Oregon's runner-up DMR team and anchored the third-place 4 × 1500 m squad at the Penn Relays. She was third in the 1500, the top collegian, at the Oregon Relays. At the Pac-10 Championships, she took third in the 1500m. She won her preliminary 1500m race at the NCAA West Regional to advance to the NCAA Championships. She took third in her heat to advance to the finals, where she produced one of the competition's biggest surprises. Keeping pace with the leaders the entire way, she finished third as a freshman behind a pair of seniors to become the highest placing freshman runner at the 2010 NCAA Championships. She was ranked eighth nationally in the 1500m (4:14.67) as a freshman in college.

Following her collegiate season, she ran at the USATF Junior Track & Field Championships, where she won the 1500 meters (4:26.38) and was the runner-up in the 3000 meters (9:18.92). This qualified her for the IAAF World Junior Championships in both events. At Worlds, she placed ninth in the 3000m, opening the competition with a personal best. She was second in her preliminary 1500m heat, but she placed fourth in the final, just off a medal.

==== Sophomore year (2010-11) ====
Early in the season, Hasay led the Ducks to an impressive runner-up finish at University of Notre Dame with her eighth-place finish (16:45) in the 5k. She earned her first collegiate cross country victory at the Bill Dellinger Invitational, edging out teammate Alex Kosinski to lead the Ducks to the team title. She won the Pac-10 individual cross country title, to help the women tie for third in the closest team race in Pac-10 history. She followed that performance up by winning the NCAA West Regional meet to help Oregon finish second and automatically advance to the NCAA Championships. She finished third at the NCAA CHampionships in 20:13 (6k). That was the best finish by a female duck since 1991. She earned her second straight cross country All American award. She was also awarded Pac-10 Athlete of the Year.

She set a school record and was part of two NCAA automatic qualifiers in her season debut at the UW Invitational. She broke the 3000m record by two seconds, winning in 9:05.42. She also ran the lead leg on Oregon's distance medley relay that won in 11:02.15. This mark broke the Dempsy Indoor Facility stadium record. She followed up that by running a nation-leading time in the mile at the Husky Classic, 4:34.75. At the MPSF Championships, she defended her title in the mile and tied for seventh place in the 800 meters. At the NCAA Indoor Championships, she led a 1–3–4 Duck finish in the mile to help Oregon capture its second national consecutive title. She broke the school record in the process. She came back the next day to hold off Villanova's Sheila Reid to win the 3000 meters. She also anchored the Ducks' runner-up DMR team, and broke the school record in 10:52.9. She was selected as the USATFCCCA's National Indoor Track Scholar-Athlete of the Year. With these two victories, she became the first person to win two Foot Locker Cross Country Championships and two NCAA Championships. That feat was duplicated in 2014 by Oregon teammate Edward Cheserek.

Her outdoor season debut was a memorable one, winning the 1500m in 4:18.61 at the Pepsi Team Invitational. She ran a nation-leading 15:37.29 in the 5000m at the Mt. SAC Relays. She ran the 1500m at the Payton Jordan Cardinal Invitational in a field of professionals, with an impressive performance of 4:10.28. She doubled at the Pac-10 Championships in the 1500m and 5000m. She successfully executed the demanding double again at the NCAA West Regional. She earned All-American honors in the 1500m and 5k at the NCAA Championships, where she was eighth and fourth respectively. She was named the National Academic All-American of the Year for Women's Track & Field/Cross Country.

She capped off a strong season by finishing ninth in the final of the 1500m at the USATF Championships in the senior race against professionals.

==== Junior year (2011-12) ====
She had a terrific season debut at the Wisconsin Adidas Invitational, where she was the runner-up to defending NCAA Champion Sheila Reid of Villanova. She showcased a solid run at the Pac-12 Championships where she placed third, to help Oregon place fourth overall. She successfully defended her NCAA West Regional title. She finished as the runner-up at the NCAA Women's Division I Cross Country Championship. She covered the 6k LaVerne Gibson Championship Course in 19:41.8, just a step behind Reid who won in one of the closest finishes in NCAA Cross Country history, 0.6 seconds ahead. She led the Oregon Women to a fifth-place team finish, their highest placing in three years. She was named Pac-12 Cross Country Athlete of the Year.

Hasay opened her indoor season with a win at the Texas A&M Challenge in the mile. She broke her own school record in the 3000m in a tight runner-up finish at the MPSF Championships in 9:03.95. She scored 11 team points for Oregon at the NCAA Women's Division I Indoor Track and Field Championships where she placed third in the mile and fourth in the 3000m, leading her team to their third consecutive indoor title.

During this outdoor season, she focused on the 1500 meters. She opened the season with a 1500m at the Oregon Relays. She successfully defended her Pac-12 title at 1500m. She won easily at the NCAA West Regional, which advanced her to the NCAA Championships. She took third in the 1500m final at the NCAA Women's Division I Outdoor Track and Field Championships in 4:14.03. She ran her only 5000m of the season at the Payton Jordan Cardinal Invitational.

After her collegiate season, Hasay qualified for the Olympic Trials, where she advanced to the semifinals but failed to make the final. Hasay won 2012 U-23 NACAC 1500 meters in Mexico representing USA.

==== Senior year (2012-13) ====
Hasay placed seventh overall the Bill Dellinger Invitational with a time of 17:04, where her teammate and best friend, Alexi Pappas, won. She had a strong showing at the Pre-Nationals by placing fifth overall, which was instrumental in helping the ducks place second as a team. She came in second at the Pac-12 Championships with a time of 20:10, which led the team to win the conference title. She won the NCAA West Regional for the third year in a row with a time of 19:16, propelling the Ducks to win the meet. She was named the USTFCCCA West Region Athlete of the Year. She placed third in the NCAA Cross Country Championships and was Oregon's top finisher. She led the ducks to winning their first national Cross Country title since 1987. She again won All-American status, making her the first woman in NCAA history to win four cross country All-America awards. She was named Pac-12 Scholar Athlete of the Year.

At the 2013 NCAA Women's Indoor Track and Field Championship, Hasay did not run the mile due to starting to focus on the longer distances. She placed second in the 3000m and fourth in the 5000m, leading Oregon to its fourth indoor title.

During her 2013 outdoor season, she ran 32:06 in her 10000m debut, getting third at the Payton Jordan Invitational to Shalane Flanagan and Kara Goucher. This time was only one second off the B Standard for the IAAF World Championships in Athletics in Moscow. She finished a disappointing 18th in the NCAA West Regional 10k, but won her heat of the 5k to advance to the NCAA Championships. In her last race in a Duck uniform she took third in the final of the 5000m, getting second to winner Abbey D'Agostino and Betsy Saina. Hasay was named 2013 Track & Field Scholar Athlete of the Year. Hasay finished her University of Oregon tenure as 18 time All-American.

| Year | 6 km Cross Country | Indoor Track | Outdoor Track |
|---|---|---|---|
| 2009 | 18th, 20:23.1 | DMR, 2nd 3,000 Meters, DNF; Mile, 4th | 1,500 Meters, 3rd |
| 2010 | 3rd, 20:13.0 | DMR, 2nd 3,000 Meters, 1st Mile, 1st | 5,000 Meters, 4th 1,500 Meters, 8th |
| 2011 | 2nd, 19:41.8 | 3,000 Meters, 4th Mile, 3rd | 1,500 Meters, 3rd |
| 2012 | 3rd, 19:28.6 | 5,000 Meters, 4th 3,000 Meters, 2nd | 5,000 Meters, 3rd |

=== 2013 season ===
After graduating from the University of Oregon in 2013, Hasay signed with Nike, Inc. and joined the Nike Oregon Project, to be coached by Alberto Salazar. She placed second in the 10,000 metres at the U.S. National Championships. Shortly thereafter, she ran a 31:46.2 10,000 meters, which was faster than the World Championships "B" Standard of 32:05 but slightly slower than the "A" Standard of 31:45. She earned a spot on her first senior World Championships team. After getting the standard, Hasay set a new personal best while finishing sixth in the 3000 meters at the London Diamond League meet. This was her international professional debut.

In the 10,000 meters race at the World Championships, she finished twelfth with a finish time that was about 30 seconds slower than her qualifying race.

=== 2014 season ===
At the 2014 Payton Jordan Invitational she improved upon her personal best at 10,000, running 31:39.67. Her 10 km time is the 5th fastest in the world in 2014 according to IAAF as of July 11. Hasay is the second rated 10,000 meter woman (behind Shalane Flanagan) to qualify for 2014 USA Outdoor Track and Field Championships. At those championships, Flanagan did not run, but Hasay still came in second in 32:03.28, her kick unable to break a second surge by Kim Conley. Hasay later ran a personal best 1500 metres in 4:07.70 at a meet in Glasgow, Scotland on July 11, 2014.

Jordan Hasay won the 2014 Tufts Health Plan 10K for Women in a personal best time of 31:38. Hasay's time is less than 2 seconds from the American Road 10 km record set earlier this June by Molly Huddle.

=== 2015 season ===
Hasay earned a silver medal in the two miles race at the USA Indoor Track and Field Championships in Boston with a finish time of 9:44.69.

Although Hasay was scheduled to race in the 10,000 meters at the USA Outdoor Track and Field Championships, she withdrew because of plantar fasciitis and tendinitis in her foot.

=== 2016 season ===
Prior to the 2016 United States Olympic Trials, Hasay appeared on the cover of Runner's World magazine.

Hasay ran 31:58.33 in the 10,000 meters at the Payton Jordan Invitational, thus meeting the 2016 Olympic standard of 32:15.

Hasay placed eighth in the 5000 meters at the Portland Track Festival on June 15 with a finish time of 15:32.19.

At the U.S. Olympic Trials, which was also the U.S. national championships, Hasay finished thirteenth in the 5000 meters (15:51.68) and ninth in the 10,000 meters (32:43.43).

Hasay won the USATF 10 Mile Championships in St. Paul, Minnesota on October 9, running 52:49.

=== 2017 season ===
In January, Hasay finished fourth in the Aramco Houston Half Marathon. Her time of 01:08:40 was a course record for an American female and the second fastest half marathon debut by an American female.

In March, she won the Gate River Run, which also served as the U.S. national championships for 15 kilometers.

On April 1, Hasay placed sixth in the Prague Half Marathon in a time of 1:07:55. She became the fourth American woman to run a half marathon in under 68 minutes after Molly Huddle, Kara Goucher, and Deena Kastor.

On April 17, Hasay finished third in the Boston Marathon. Her time of 2:23:00 was 10 seconds behind second-place finisher Rose Chelimo, with the winner Edna Kiplagat recording a time of 2:21:52. Hasay's finish time was the fastest debut marathon by a U.S. woman by almost three minutes.

On October 8, Hasay placed third in the Chicago Marathon with a finish time of 2:20:57. Her run also gave her a US 25k women's record, 1:22:19, surpassing Shalane Flanagan's time of 1:22:36 at the 2014 Berlin Marathon.

=== 2018 season ===
In January, Hasay finished eighth in the Aramco Houston Half Marathon in 1:08:38.

In March, Hasay placed second in the US 15 km Championships in Jacksonville, Florida.

=== 2019 season ===
Hasay placed third in the 2019 Boston Marathon with a time of 2:25:20.

== Competition results ==
=== U.S. national championships ===
==== Road championships ====
| Year | Competition | Venue | Position | Event | Notes |
|---|---|---|---|---|---|
| 2016 | USATF 5 km Championships hosted by CVS Health Downtown 5k | Providence, Rhode Island | 3rd | 5 km | 15:48 |
| 2016 | USATF 10 Mile Championships hosted by the Medtronic TC 10 Mile | St Paul, Minnesota/Minneapolis, MN | 1st | 10 mile | 52:49 |
| 2017 | USATF 15 km Championships hosted by Gate River Run | Jacksonville, Florida | 1st | 15 km | 49:28 |
| 2017 | USATF 10 km Championships hosted by AJC Peachtree Road Race | Atlanta Georgia | 3rd | 10 km | 33:08 |
| 2017 | USATF 20 km Championships hosted by Faxon Law New Haven Road Race | New Haven, Connecticut | 1st | 20 km | 1:06:35 |
| 2018 | USATF 15 km Championships hosted by Gate River Run | Jacksonville, Florida | 2nd | 15 km | 48:40 |

==== Outdoor track championships ====
| Year | Competition | Venue | Position | Event | Notes |
|---|---|---|---|---|---|
| 2011 | USA Outdoor Track and Field Championships | Eugene, Oregon | 9th | 1500 m | 4:12.66 |
| 2012 | US Olympic Trials | Eugene, Oregon | 23rd | 1500 m | 4:15.52 |
| 2013 | USA Outdoor Track and Field Championships | Des Moines, Iowa | 2nd | 10,000 m | 32:17.34 |
| 2014 | USA Outdoor Track and Field Championships | Sacramento, California | 2nd | 10,000 m | 32:03.28 |
| 2016 | US Olympic Trials | Eugene, Oregon | 9th | 10,000 m | 32:43.43 |

==== Indoor track championships ====
| Year | Competition | Venue | Position | Event | Notes |
|---|---|---|---|---|---|
| 2014 | USA Indoor Track and Field Championships | Albuquerque, New Mexico | 4th | 3000 m | 9:27.40 |
| 2015 | USA Indoor Track and Field Championships | Boston, Massachusetts | 2nd | 2 mile | 9:44.69 |

==== Junior championships ====
| Championships | Event | Year(s) | | | |
|---|---|---|---|---|---|
| USATF Cross Country | Junior Women's 6K | 2007, 2008 | USATF Track & Field (outdoor) | Junior Women's 3000m | 2006 |
| USATF Track & Field (outdoor) | Junior Women's 1500m | 2007**, 2008, 2009, 2010 | | | |

** Won in a meet record 4:16.98.

=== NCAA championships ===
==== Cross country ====
| Year | Competition | Venue | Position | Notes |
Representing Oregon
| 2009 | NCAA Cross Country Championships | Terre Haute, Indiana | 18th | 22:23.1 |
| 2010 | NCAA Cross Country Championships | Terre Haute, Indiana | 3rd | 20:13.0 |
| 2011 | NCAA Cross Country Championships | Terre Haute, Indiana | 2nd | 19:41.8 |
| 2012 | NCAA Cross Country Championships | Louisville, Kentucky | 3rd | 19:28.6 |

== U.S. records ==
=== High school class ===
| Class | Year | Distance | Time |
|---|---|---|---|
| Freshman | 2006 | 3000 meters | 9:26.32 |
| | | 3200 meters | 10:07.56 |
| Sophomore | | 1600 meters | 4:39.13 |
| | | 3200 meters | 10:04.07 |
| | | 2 miles | 10:07.65 |
| Junior | 2008 | 1500 meters | 4:14.50 |
| | | 3000 meters | 9:19.6 |
| | | 3200 meters | 9:52.13 |

=== Age ===
| Age | Year | Distance | Time |
|---|---|---|---|
| 12 | 2004 | 3000 meters | 9:48.77 |
| 13 | 2005 | 1500 meters | 4:28.61 |
| | | 3000 meters | 9:35.12 |
| 14 | 2006 | 1500 meters | 4:22.31 |
| | | 3000 meters | 9:26.32 |
| | | 3200 meters | 10:07.56 |
| 15 | 2007 | 1500 meters | 4:16.98 |
| | | 1600 meters | 4:39.13 |
| | | 3000 meters | 9:26.9 |
| | | 3200 meters | 10:04.07 |
| 16 | 2008 | 3000 meters | 9:19.6 |
| | | 3200 meters | 9:52.13 |

=== USATF Age Group ===
| Age Group | Distance | Time | Year |
|---|---|---|---|
| Youth | 3000 meters | 9:48.77 | 2004 |
| | 1500 meters | 4:28.61 | 2005 |
| | 3000 meters | 9:35.1 | 2005 |

Awards
| Preceded by William Wynne | USA Track & Field Youth Athlete of the Year; 2008 | Succeeded by Bryce Love |
