= Janet Cherobon-Bawcom =

American long-distance runner

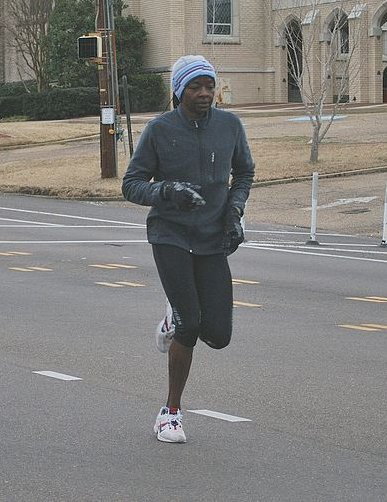
- Cherobon-Bawcom competes in the Mississippi Blues Marathon January 9, 2010.

Personal information
- Born: August 22, 1978 (age 47) Kenya
- Height: 5 ft 6 in (1.68 m)
- Weight: 115 lb (52 kg)

Sport
- Country: United States
- Sport: Track and field
- Event: 10,000 m
- Club: Atlanta Track Club
- Coached by: Jack Daniels

Achievements and titles
- Personal bests: 10,000 m: 31:12.68; Marathon: 2:29:45

Janet Cherobon-Bawcom (born August 22, 1978) is an American distance runner. She grew up in Kenya, before attending college in the United States. In college, she won three Division II national championships and was named an All-American eight times. She became eligible to compete for the United States in 2011. In 2012, she made the U.S. Olympic team in the 10,000 meters and placed 12th.

== Early life and college ==
Cherobon-Bawcom was born as Janet Cherobon on August 22, 1978, in Kapsabet, a small village in Kenya, to a single mother. She is the oldest of eight children. At the age of 19, she was walking to the bus stop when a stranger offered her a ride. She accepted, and the man turned out to be 1988 gold medalist Peter Rono. He told her that running could serve as a route to gaining a scholarship to an American college. Intrigued, Cherobon took up running, with Rono as coach. After two years, Rono was able to secure her a scholarship to Harding University in Arkansas. Cherobon left Kenya in 2000. Upon arrival at Harding, she discovered that the school had been given false information about her running ability. Fearful that her scholarship would be pulled, she trained hard all summer to improve her times.

Cherobon's training paid off. Over the next four years, named an All-American eight times, and set multiple school and national records in the process. In 2005, she won the Division II championship in the indoor 5,000 meters, the outdoor 5,000 meters, and the outdoor 10,000 meters. For her exploits, she was inducted into the Division II Track and Field Hall of Fame in 2010 and the Harding Athletic Hall of Fame in 2012.

Cherobon graduated from Harding in 2005 with a Bachelor of Business Administration degree in health care management and nursing. Of her college experience, Cherobon later remarked: "I don't think I ever really became interested [in running.] I ran to get a scholarship so that I could get my education. My goal was to come here, learn as much as I can, and then go back. So if you had asked me my goal then – that was my goal."

During college, she met future husband Jay Bawcom. Upon graduation, Janet Cherobon-Bawcom enrolled at Georgia Highlands College to obtain a license as registered nurse. She gave up running, having met her goal of using the sport to get a college education.

== Athletic career ==
The competitive desire soon returned, and Cherobon-Bawcom began to enter, and win, regional road races. She won the Pensacola Double Bridge 10K in February 2010 and February 2011 with times of 51:04 and 49:58. She added the half-marathon and marathon to her repertoire for the first time. Inspired by her success, she decided to seek out a top-notch coach, settling on Jack Daniels in 2011. His training style worked well for Cherobon-Bawcom and she quickly improved.

In 2011, Cherobon-Bawcom was a three-time U.S. road champion, winning the 20 km (with a time of 1:08:31), the 10 mi (54:15), and the 10 km (32:47) races. In August, the IAAF declared her eligible to represent the United States in international competition. At the end of the year, she was declared the women's champion of the 2011 USA Running Circuit.

=== 2012 ===
At the January 2012, U.S. Olympic marathon trials, Cherobon-Bawcom finished fifth with a time of 2:29:45, besting her personal record by nearly eight minutes. For the first time in her career, she began to think of herself as a potential Olympian. "I thought, 'huh, maybe I have a chance,'" she later recalled. "I never thought I would be number five at the Olympic trials. I never dreamt of even running in an Olympic trials. I'm still discovering myself." Later in 2012, she set a new American record in the 25 km, turning in a time of 1:24:36 at the U.S. road championship in the Fifth Third River Bank Run. She also won the 15 km road championships with a time of 49:41.

In April, Cherobon-Bawcom ran a 31:33 10,000 meters at the Payton Jordan Cardinal Invitational, her first track race in seven years. Before the race, she was only hoping to qualify for the Olympic Trials. "I thought I might qualify for the trials and go run them just for fun, but making the team didn’t really cross my mind", she said. The time met the Olympic A standard, meaning she would be eligible to represent the United States at the 2012 Olympics. "Suddenly I had to change my thinking about the trials", she remarked.

Heading into the June track and field Olympic Trials, only four American women had met the Olympic A standard. Shalane Flanagan opted to concentrate on the marathon, making Cherobon-Bawcom's qualification very likely.

During the Trials, Cherobon-Bawcom was battling an upper respiratory ailment. She finished seventh in the 10,000 meters with a time of 32:17.06. However, no additional competitors made the A standard, so she still made the team. Afterwards she commented, "It's a terrible way to get on the team, but that's the way I got in. I'm so excited." She later remarked "I've never even dreamt of going to the Olympics. If you had asked me that about a year ago I would have said 'you are out of your mind.'" Bawcom was the first ever Harding University alumna to compete at the Olympic Games.

At the Olympics, Cherobon-Bawcom placed 12th in the 10,000 meter event. Her time of 31:12.68 improved her personal best by more than 20 seconds. "It was fantastic," she remarked of the experience. "I couldn’t be any [more] proud to represent such a country with so much support. It’s a great opportunity for me to wear the uniform and do the best I can."

=== 2014 ===
Janet Cherobon-Bawcom won the CU Cherry Blossom / USA 10 Mile Championships 2014 and set a women's only start American Record and championship record in 52:12. Janet's championship record stood a year when Molly Huddle won the USA 10 Mile Championships 2015 in 51:44, but the course is not certified for American Record.

== Personal life ==
Janet Cherobon-Bawcom is married to Jay Bawcom. Bawcom, an American citizen from Searcy, Arkansas (home of Harding University), was volunteering in Kenya when he met Cherobon's mother. She asked him to bring her daughter a care package of tea and spices when he returned to the States, and he agreed. Janet and Jay subsequently fell in love and were married. As a result, Janet became a U.S. citizen in November 2010. The couple currently maintains two residences - one in Rome, Georgia, where Janet is pursuing her R.N. license, and one in Flagstaff, Arizona, where Jay is enrolled at Northern Arizona University.

Remarking on her unusual life journey, Cherobon-Bawcom said "I think God has a plan, and I think this is His plan – my plan was different. But it's been through His guidance and the help of my family that I got to where I am today."
