= Brillian Jepkorir Kipkoech =

Kenyan long-distance runner (born 1995)

Personal information
- Born: 1 March 1995 (age 31)

Sport
- Country: Kenya
- Sport: Athletics
- Turned pro: 2017
Medal record
World Half Marathon Championships
Silver medal – second place	2020 Gdynia	Team

Brillian Jepkorir Kipkoech (born 1 March 1995) is a Kenyan long-distance runner who competes in track, road and cross country running events. She was a team silver medallist at the World Athletics Half Marathon Championships in 2020.

Jepkorir made her international debut at the 2011 IAAF World Cross Country Championships, where she finished ninth in the junior race and was a non-scoring member of the silver medal-winning Kenyan team, which was led by the winner Faith Kipyegon. The following year she was runner-up in the 3000 metres at the Kenyan Junior Championships, which gained her selection for the 2012 World Junior Championships in Athletics. She placed sixth at that competition in Barcelona, which was won by her teammate and national champion Mercy Chebwogen.

She had a break in her career after her initial age category performances and returned to action in road running events in 2017. She made her debut in the half marathon in Bilbao and was runner-up with a time of 1:16:37. A successful year in the United States following in 2018, with wins at the Youngstown Peace Race, Tulsa Run, and Crim Ten Miler, as well as ninth place at the B.A.A. Half Marathon with a new best of 1:16:00. She won that Boston race in 2019, having set a new best of 1:07:12 in a fifth-place finish at the Copenhagen Half Marathon a month earlier. Among her other performances were runner-up finishes at the B.A.A. 10K, Crescent City Classic and Tuskys Great 10K Run, wins at the Cape Town 12 ONERUN and Marseille-Cassis Classique Internationale, plus a fourth-place finish in the 10,000 metres at the Kenyan Athletics Championships.

Jepkorir opened 2020 with second place at the Houston Half Marathon in January, finishing behind Japan's Hitomi Niiya. The COVID-19 pandemic but the athletics season on hold for most of the year, though she returned with a new personal best of 1:06:56 at the 2020 World Athletics Half Marathon Championships, taking ninth place and helping the Kenyan team to second in the team rankings alongside winner Peres Jepchirchir and Joyciline Jepkosgei.

== International competitions ==
Year	Competition	Venue	Position	Event	Notes
2011	World Cross Country Championships	Punta Umbría, Spain	9th	Junior race	19:33
2011	World Cross Country Championships	Punta Umbría, Spain	2nd	Junior team	19 pts
2012	World Junior Championships	Barcelona, Spain	5th	3000 m	9:14.32
2020	World Half Marathon Championships	Gdynia, Poland	9th	Half marathon	1:06:56
2020	World Half Marathon Championships	Gdynia, Poland	2nd	Team	3:28:42

== Personal bests ==
- 3000 metres – 9:14.32 (2012)
- 10,000 metres – 31:30.39 (2019)
- 10K run – 31:04 (2019)
- Half marathon – 1:06:56 (2020)
