= Conner Mantz =

American long-distance runner (born 1996)

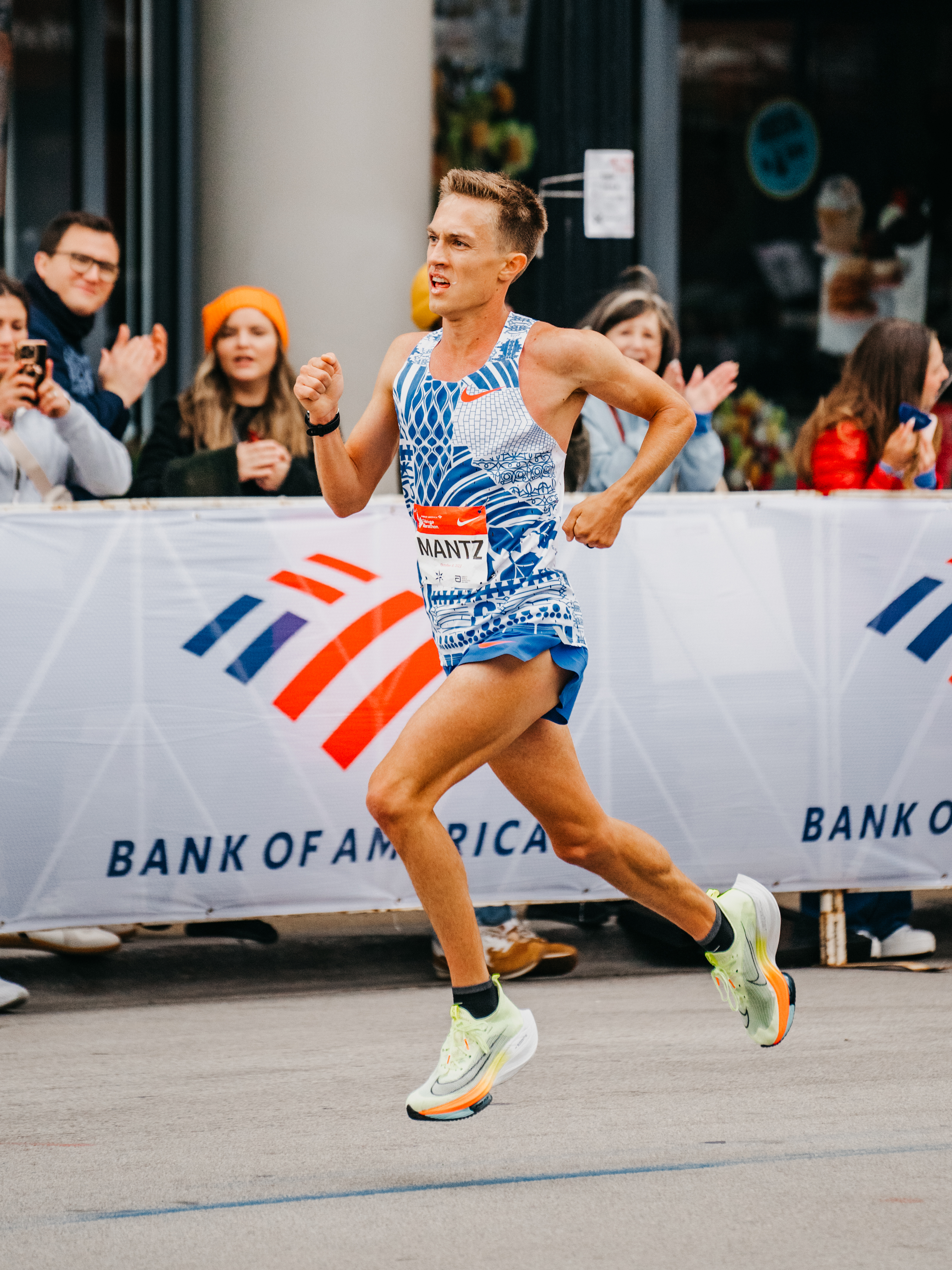
- Mantz at the 2023 Chicago Marathon

Personal information
- Full name: Conner Blair Mantz
- Born: December 8, 1996 (age 29) Logan, Utah, U.S.
- Home town: Smithfield, Utah, U.S.
- Height: 173 cm (5 ft 8 in)
- Spouse: Kylie Mantz

Sport
- Country: United States
- Sport: Track and Field, Road running Cross country running
- Events: 1500m, 5000m, 10,000m, Half marathon, Marathon
- University team: BYU Cougars
- Turned pro: December 2021
- Coached by: Ed Eyestone

Achievements and titles
- Personal bests: Outdoor; 1500 m: 3:37.92 (Eugene 2023); 5000 m: 13:11.81 (Eugene 2022); 10,000 m: 27:25.23 (San Juan Capistrano 2022); Indoor; 3000 m: 7:41.43i (New York 2022); 5000 m: 13:10.24i (Boston 2022); Road; 10 km: 27:26 (Cape Elizabeth, Maine 2025); Half marathon: 59:15 (New York City 2025, on a non-record-eligible course); 59:17 AR (Houston 2025); Marathon: 2:04:43 AR (Chicago 2025)
Medal record
Men's athletics
Representing United States
World Road Running Championships
Bronze medal – third place	2026 Copenhagen	Half marathon team

Conner Blair Mantz (born December 8, 1996) is an American long-distance runner who specializes in the marathon. Mantz ran collegiately for Brigham Young University, winning the 2020 and 2021 NCAA Division I Cross Country Championships. Mantz holds American records in both the half marathon (set at the 2025 Houston Half Marathon), and the marathon (set at the 2025 Chicago Marathon). He has competed professionally for Nike since 2021 and was the top American finisher at the 2024 Paris Olympic Marathon, finishing in 8th place.

== Background and youth sports ==
Mantz completed his first half marathon at age 12, which motivated him to participate in other races. At age 14, he finished a half marathon in 1:11:24, averaging a pace of 5:26.8 minutes per mile. He attended Sky View High School in Smithfield, Utah, where he was a three-time All-American at the Foot Locker Cross Country Championships. Mantz also represented the United States in the junior race at the 2015 IAAF World Cross Country Championships in Guiyang, China. He placed 29th over the 8 km race, leading Team USA to a sixth place finish.

Mantz committed to Brigham Young University (BYU), among offers from several other institutions, including Princeton and Furman. After high school, Mantz took a two-year hiatus from running to serve as a missionary for The Church of Jesus Christ of Latter-day Saints in Ghana. Upon returning in 2017, Mantz redshirted his first year at BYU.

His great grandfather, Paul Mantz, was a noted air racing pilot and flight instructor.

== Collegiate competition ==
Mantz ran for Brigham Young University (BYU). He won a national title at the 2020 NCAA Division I Cross Country Championships in Stillwater, Oklahoma. He won by over 20 seconds with a final time of 29:26.1. Mantz's victory broke a streak of wins by international athletes and made him the first American to win the event since Galen Rupp in 2008.

The 2021 NCAA Division I Cross Country Championships saw Mantz repeat as the winner. He covered the first 5k of the race in 14:16.4 and the second 5k in 14:16.7 to finish in a course record of 28:33.1. The win concluded an undefeated season of cross country for Mantz.

Performances by Mantz on the track included a world-leading performance of 13:34.46 over 5000 m at the UW Invitational in February 2021. His time also broke the BYU school record for the indoor 5000 m. Later that year, Mantz finished runner up in the 10000 metres at the 2021 NCAA Division I Outdoor Track and Field Championships.

== Senior competition ==
=== 2021 ===
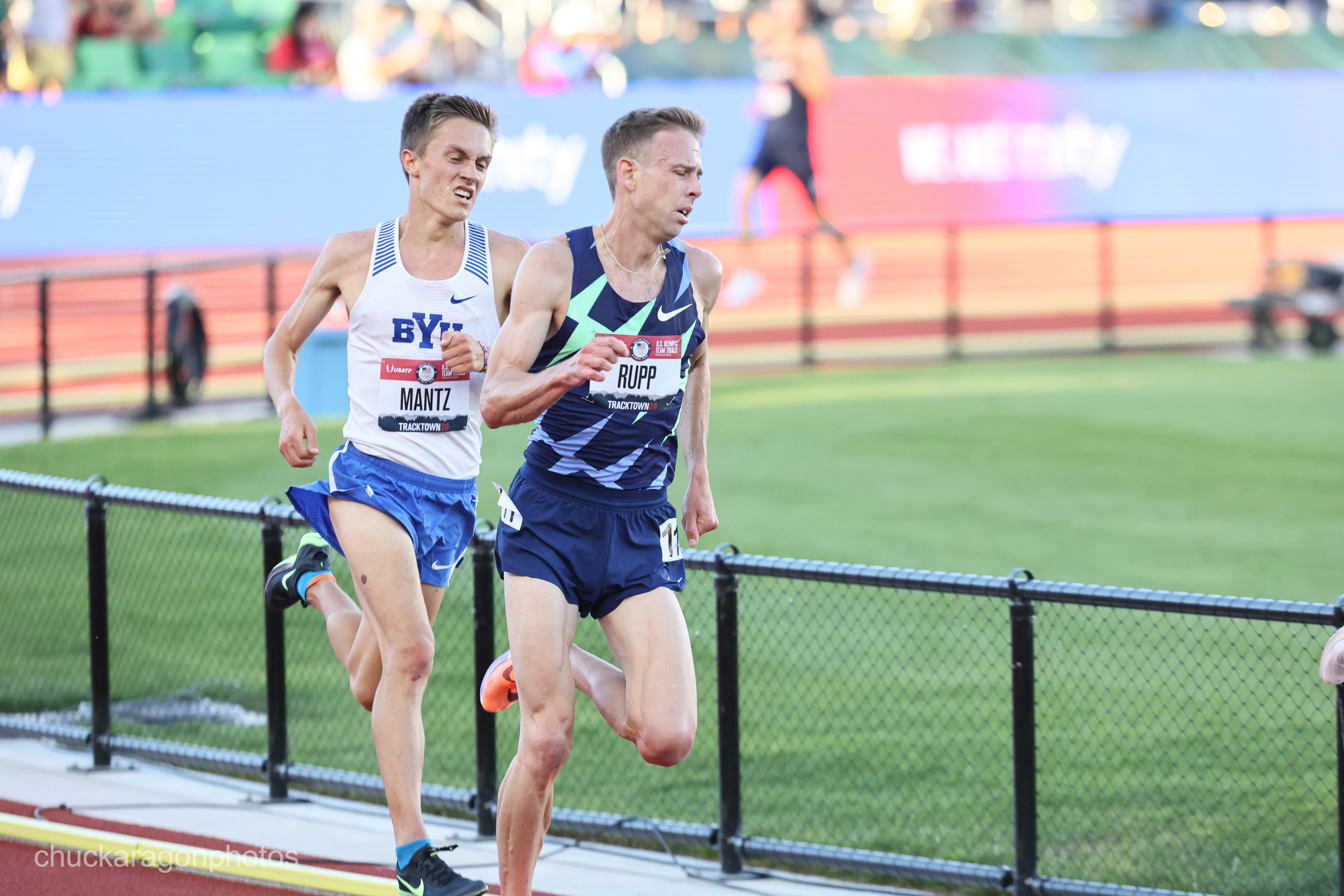
Mantz (left) and Galen Rupp compete in the 10000 metres at the 2020 US Olympic Trials.

Mantz competed in the 2020 United States Olympic trials in June 2021, which were delayed due to COVID-19 pandemic. He placed fifth in the 5000 m and eighth in the 10000 m.

ln December 2021, Mantz won the USA Half Marathon Championships in Hardeeville, South Carolina with a time of 1:00:55. He next took fifth at the NYC half marathon in 1:01.40.

=== 2022 ===
In September 2022, Mantz won a national title at the USATF 20 Km Road Championships. The following month, he debuted in the marathon at the 2022 Chicago Marathon, placing seventh in 2:08:16. He was the top American finisher in the race. His performance was the second fastest marathon debut by an American, trailing Leonard Korir's debut record of 2:07:56.

=== 2023 ===
At the 2023 Boston Marathon, Mantz stayed in the lead pack for most of the race. Running with a large group of leaders, including Eliud Kipchoge, Evans Chebet, CJ Albertson, Mantz reached halfway in 1:02:20. By the 20-mile mark, he was 45 seconds off the five leaders (which included Chebet and Benson Kipruto). He nearly blacked out at mile 24, but stayed upright to finish as the third American (11th overall) in 2:10:25. At the 2023 Chicago Marathon, Mantz was the sixth place finisher and top American, lowering his personal best by 29 seconds to 2:07:47. His time met the qualifying standard for the 2024 Paris Olympics.

=== 2024 ===
Mantz won the 2024 U.S. Olympic Marathon Trials, qualifying for the 2024 Paris Olympics, where he placed 8th. He ran much of the race in Paris with his training partner, Clayton Young, who finished ninth.

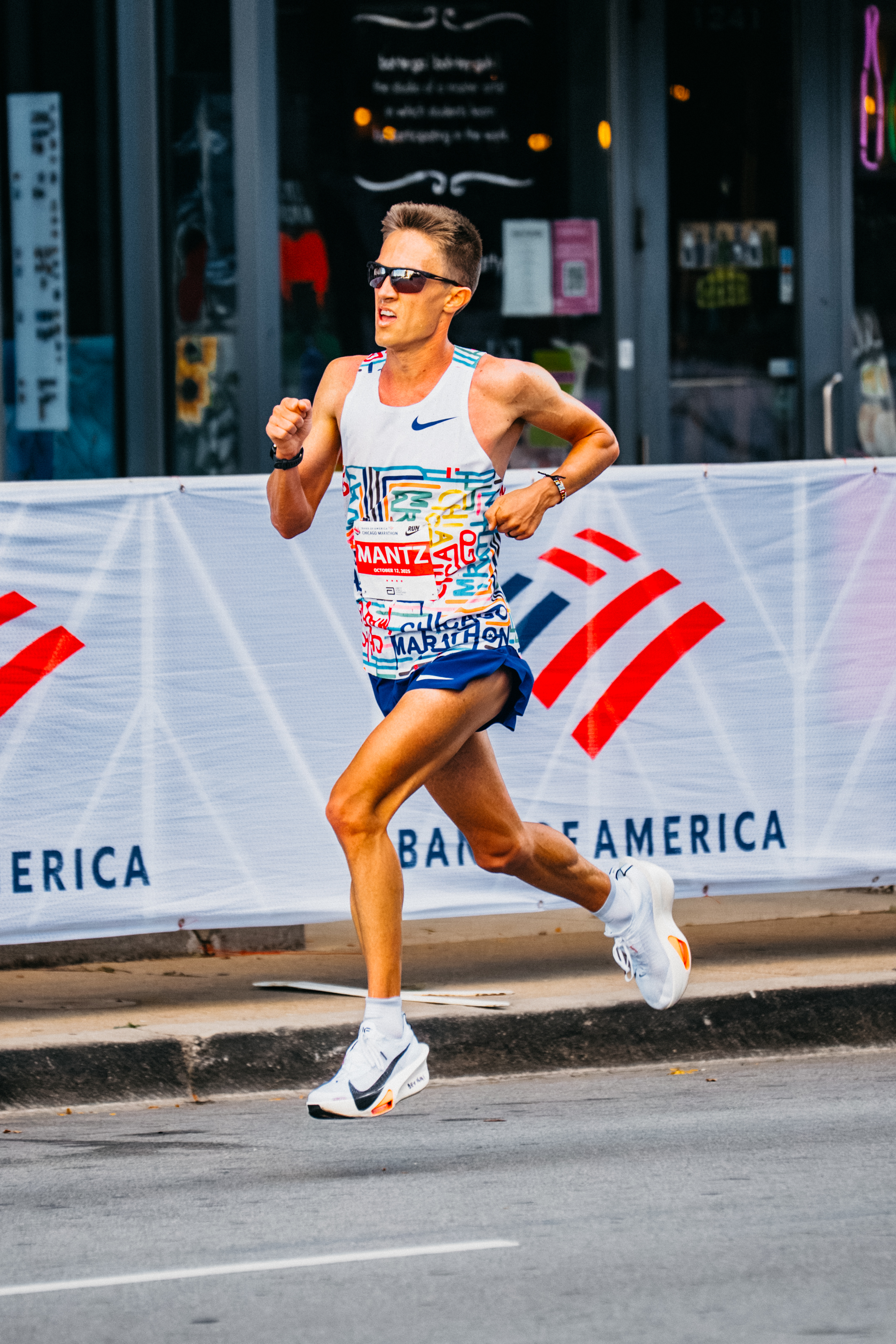
Mantz at mile 25 of the 2025 Chicago Marathon before finishing 4th overall and breaking the American Record

Although Mantz's personal best was the 56th fastest in the field, he produced an eighth place finish in the marathon at the 2024 Paris Olympics. In the lead up to the Olympics, Mantz suffered a two inch tear in one of his quad muscles. While recovering from the injury, he swam up to 10,000 yards in one day and worked on the hills he would face in Paris by running uphill and getting driven downhill in repetition. In his first marathon since the Olympic Games, Mantz placed sixth at the 2024 New York City Marathon. His time of 2:09:00 was the fastest for an American man since Alberto Salazar in 1981.

=== 2025 ===
Mantz set the American record in the half-marathon in January, running 59:17 in Houston. His record broke the previous best mark set by Ryan Hall in 2007. He set another personal best at the New York City Half-Marathon on March 16, running 59:15; however, the course was not eligible for an American record. He finished second behind Abel Kipchumba of Kenya. At the 2025 Boston Marathon Mantz stayed with the lead pack until John Korir broke off in the final 10k, leaving Mantz with Tanzanian Simbu and Kenyan Kotut to battle for the final two podium places. Simbu and Kotut had a photo finish for 2nd and 3rd and Mantz finished 4 seconds behind them in 4th place and a personal best of 2:05:08. Over the summer, Mantz won the Beach to Beacon 10K in a time 27:26, which broke the previous course record set by Gilbert Okari in 2003. Mantz is one of only two Americans, along with Ben True, to ever win the road race. At the 2025 Chicago Marathon, Mantz finished in 4th, breaking the American marathon record with a time of 2:04:43.

== Achievements ==
=== National championships ===
Year	Competition	Venue	Position	Event	Notes
2021	United States Olympic Trials	Eugene, Oregon	5th	10,000 m	27:59.37
2021	United States Olympic Trials	Eugene, Oregon	8th	5000 m	13:32.69
2021	USA Half Marathon Championships	Hardeeville, South Carolina	1st	Half Marathon	1:00:55
2022	2022 USA Indoor Track and Field Championships	Spokane, Washington	4th	3000 m	7:49.43
2022	2022 USA Outdoor Track and Field Championships	Eugene, Oregon	4th	5000 m	13:11.81
2022	2022 USA Outdoor Track and Field Championships	Eugene, Oregon	7th	10000 m	28:31.24
2022	USATF 8 km Championships	Kingsport, Tennessee	2nd	8 km	22:42
2022	USATF 20 km Championships	New Haven, Connecticut	1st	20 km	59:08
2023	2023 USA Outdoor Track and Field Championships	Eugene, Oregon	6th	10,000 m	28:29.36
2023	2023 USA Outdoor Track and Field Championships	Eugene, Oregon	10th	5000 m	13:30.85
2023	USATF 20 km Championships	New Haven, Connecticut	2nd	20 km	59:16
2024	United States Olympic Trials	Orlando, Florida	1st	Marathon	2:09:05
2024	United States Olympic Trials	Eugene, Oregon	6th	10,000 m	28:00.90
2025	USATF 20 km Championships	New Haven, Connecticut	1st	20 km	56:16

== BYU ==
Representing BYU Cougars
School Year	West Coast Conference Cross Country Championship	NCAA Cross Country Championship	MPSF Indoor Track Championship	NCAA Indoor Track Championship	NCAA Division I Outdoor Track Championship
2021-22 Red Shirt-Senior	1st 23:01.0	1st 28:33.1			
2020-21 Senior	1st 22:54.4	1st 29:26.1			10,000m 2nd 27:42.46
2019-20 Junior	1st 23:33.8	3rd 30:40.0			
2018-19 Sophomore	3rd 23:24.7	10th 29:17.1	3000m 2nd 7:50.90	3000m 7th 7:56.72	5000m 7th 14:09.20
2018-19 Sophomore	3rd 23:24.7	10th 29:17.1	3000m 2nd 7:50.90	5000m 10th 13:51.45	10,000m 4th 29:19.93
2017-18 Freshman			3000m 10th 8:02.75		10,000m 22nd 31:37.34
2017-18 Freshman			5000m 6th 14:01.96		10,000m 22nd 31:37.34

== Sky View High School ==
Year	Foot Locker Cross Country Championships	New Balance Indoor Nationals	
2014	10th 15:27.0		
2013-14	7th 15:23.0	5000m 14:24:33; 1st	Brooks PR; 2 mile 4th 8:56.62
2012-13	12th 15:32.3		Great Southwest Classic; 3200 Meters 2nd 9:32.51
Representing Sky View High School at Utah High School Activities Association
Year	Cross Country class 4 state championship		Outdoor Track and Field class 4 state championship
2014-15	15:18.9; 2nd place		3200 m 9:03.47; 1st
2014-15	15:18.9; 2nd place		1600 m 4:13.68; 2nd
2014-15	15:18.9; 2nd place		800 m 1:58.20; 10th
2013-14	15:11.5; 1st place		3200 m 8:57.99; 1st
2013-14	15:11.5; 1st place		1600 m 4:10.47; 1st
2013-14	15:11.5; 1st place		800 m 1:56.80; 5th
2012-13	15:17.8; 3rd place		3200 m 9:10.20; 2nd
2012-13	15:17.8; 3rd place		1600 m 4:16.08; 3rd
2011-12	15:40.0; 2nd place		3200 m 9:18.56; 3rd
2011-12	15:40.0; 2nd place		1600 m 4:22.5; 7th
