= Aisling Cuffe =

American long-distance runner

Personal information
- Nationality: American
- Born: September 12, 1993 (age 33) Cornwall, New York
- Height: 1.58 m (5 ft 2 in)

Sport
- Country: United States
- Sport: Track, long-distance running
- Events: 1500 meters, mile, 5000 meters, 10,000 meters
- College team: Stanford Cardinal
- Team: Saucony
- Turned pro: 2016
- Coached by: Ray Treacy
Medal record
Women's athletics
Representing the United States
Pan American Junior Championships
Silver medal – second place	2009 Port-of-Spain	5000 m

Aisling Marie Cuffe (born September 12, 1993, in Cornwall, New York) is a long-distance runner from the United States. She competed in the 2012 World Junior Championships in Athletics placing 6th in 3000 meters. Cuffe ran 15:09 for the runner-up finish at 2012 Great Edinburgh International Cross Country. She competed in the 2011 IAAF World Cross Country Championships – Junior women's race placing 17th. Cuffe placed 2nd in 5000 meters at 2009 Pan American Junior Athletics Championships.

== High school ==
Aisling Cuffe won 2009 and 2010 New York State Public High School Athletic Association Division A state Cross country titles for Cornwall Central High School. Cuffe is a seven time New York state champion. Cuffe won 2010 Foot Locker Cross Country Championships. Cuffe finished 17th at 2011 IAAF World Cross Country Championships – Junior women's race. Cuffe is a 2010-11 Gatorade cross country runner of the year in New York.

== Personal life ==
Aisling Cuffe married Collin Leibold on September 16, 2018.

== NCAA ==
Aisling Cuffe is a 3 time Pac-12 champion. She placed second in 5000 meters in a time of 15:37.74 at 2014 NCAA Division I Outdoor Track and Field Championships. Cuffe finished sixth at 2012 World Junior Championships in Athletics – Women's 3000 metres.

Year	Pac-12 Conference Cross Country	NCAA Cross Country	MPSF indoor	NCAA indoor	Pac-12 Conference Outdoor	NCAA Outdoor
2015-16	19:53.0 1st	20:57.2 117th	3000 m 9:10.59 6th		1500 m 4:23.69 13th	5000 m 16:08.56 9th
2014-15						
2013-14					1500 m 4:18.29 1st	
2013-14			3000 m 9:04.57 1st	3000 m 9:17.87 7th		
2013-14	21:04.0 1st	20:09.3 4th		5000 m 16:22.48 2nd	5000 m 16:11.97 2nd	5000 m 15:37.74 2nd
2012-13	20:31.8 10th	20:03.7 21st			5000 m 16:37.12 6th	5000 m 16:16.37 13th
2012-13					1500 m 4:23.57 10th	
2011-12		20:49.6 74th		DMR 11:14.61 9th	5000 m 16:42.00 10th	5000 m 17:07.32 64th
2011-12			3000 m 9:10.07 5th	3000 m 9:27.57 14th		

== US Championships ==
Year	Competition	Venue	Position	Event	Notes
2018	USATF Road 5 km Championship; Abbott Dash to the Finish Line 5K	New York City	8th	5 km	16:06
2014	USATF Outdoor Championships	Sacramento, California	4th	5000 m	15:13.15
2011	USA Cross Country Championships Junior	Mission Bay Park, San Diego	1st	6000 m	21:13
2010	USA Junior Outdoor Track & Field Championships	Drake Stadium, Des Moines, Iowa	3rd	3000 m	9:20.94
2009	USA Junior Outdoor Track & Field Championships	Hayward Field	1st	5000 m	16:43.58
