= 2023 Chicago Marathon =

26.2 mi (42.195 km) race in Illinois, U.S.

45th Chicago Marathon
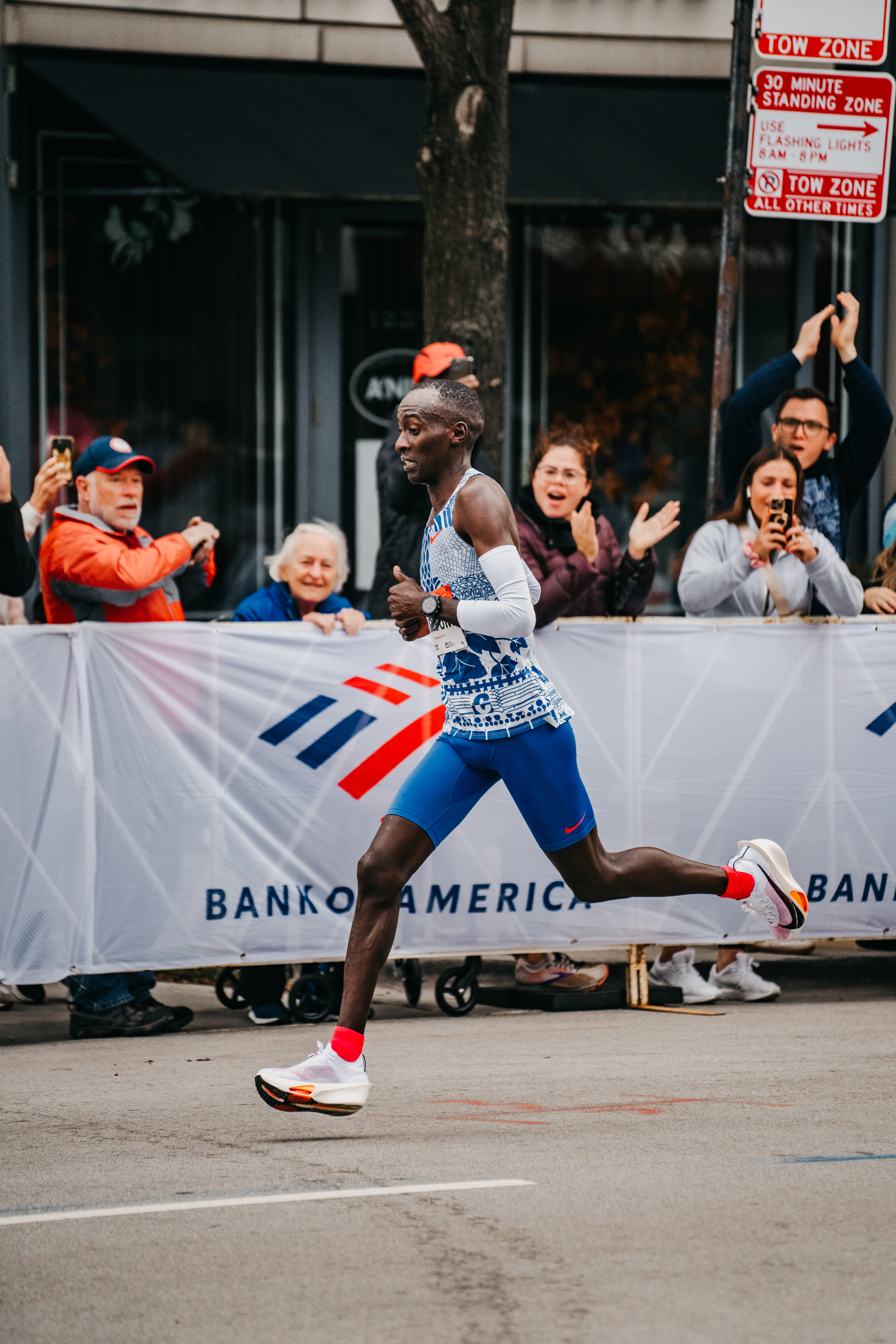
- Winner Kelvin Kiptum setting the marathon world record
- Location: Chicago, Illinois, U.S.
- Dates: October 8, 2023 (3 years ago)
- Website: chicagomarathon.com

Champions
- Men: Kelvin Kiptum (2:00:35)
- Women: Sifan Hassan (2:13:44)
- Wheelchair men: Marcel Hug (1:22:37)
- Wheelchair women: Catherine Debrunner (1:38:44)

The 2023 Chicago Marathon was the 45th edition of the annual marathon race in Chicago, held on Sunday, October 8, 2023. A Platinum Label marathon, it was the fifth of six World Marathon Majors events that were held in 2023. The race also hosted the age group world championships for the year.

Kenyan runner Kelvin Kiptum set a new marathon world record, winning the race with a time of 2:00:35, and beating the previous world record of 2:01:09, set by his compatriot Eliud Kipchoge at the 2022 Berlin Marathon, by 34 seconds. Kiptum broke free from all the other runners by the 35 km (22 mi) mark, and finished the race with a significant negative split. This was Kiptum's third marathon, after he set the course record at the 2022 Valencia Marathon with a time of 2:01:53 in what was the fastest marathon debut ever, and then set another course record at the 2023 London Marathon with a time of 2:01:25.

Dutch runner Sifan Hassan set a new woman's course record by finishing the race with a time of 2:13:44, running the second-fastest marathon by a woman, in her second marathon ever. Hassan had debuted at the marathon distance with the 2023 London Marathon, which she won with a time of 2:18:33. Swiss wheelchair athletes Marcel Hug and Catherine Debrunner both set course records with their victories, finishing with times of 1:22:37 and 1:38:44, respectively. The marathon was Debrunner's debut race in the United States; Hug broke his own course record. U.S. runner Jake Caswell claimed victory in the non-binary division with a time of 2:38:05.

Both the men's and women's records were notably set in a prototype version of the Nike Alphafly 3, the latest version in Nike's line of carbon-plated "super shoes", which were originally introduced during Nike's Breaking2 project.

A total of 48,398 runners and 45 wheelchair athletes finished the marathon. First-time marathon runner Allison Naval of Evanston, Illinois, was celebrated as the millionth finisher of the Chicago Marathon since the modern incarnation's inaugural race in 1977. (Note: The original Chicago Marathon was first held on September 23, 1905, not long after the inaugural modern Olympic Games in 1896 popularized the event. This first version of the Chicago Marathon was held until the 1920s.) Naval completed the marathon with a time of 4:23:13.

== Background ==
External image
- Course map in 2023

The first running of the modern incarnation of the Chicago Marathon was held on September 25, 1977, as the "Mayor Daley Marathon". Since then, the Chicago Marathon has gained a reputation of having a flat course that is capable of producing fast performances. Before the 2023 race, five marathon world records had been set at the Chicago Marathon, the most recent being a marathon world record for women, 2:14:04, set at the 2019 race by Kenyan runner Brigid Kosgei. (Note: This world record was broken at the 2023 Berlin Marathon by Tigst Assefa, who finished with a time of 2:11:53.) The last time the men's marathon world record was set in Chicago was during the 1999 race, which Moroccan (Note: Khannouchi became a U.S. citizen in 2000.) runner Khalid Khannouchi won with a time of 2:05:42. (Note: Khannouchi broke his own world record by four seconds at the 2002 London Marathon, which he completed with a time of 2:05:38.)

== Competitors ==
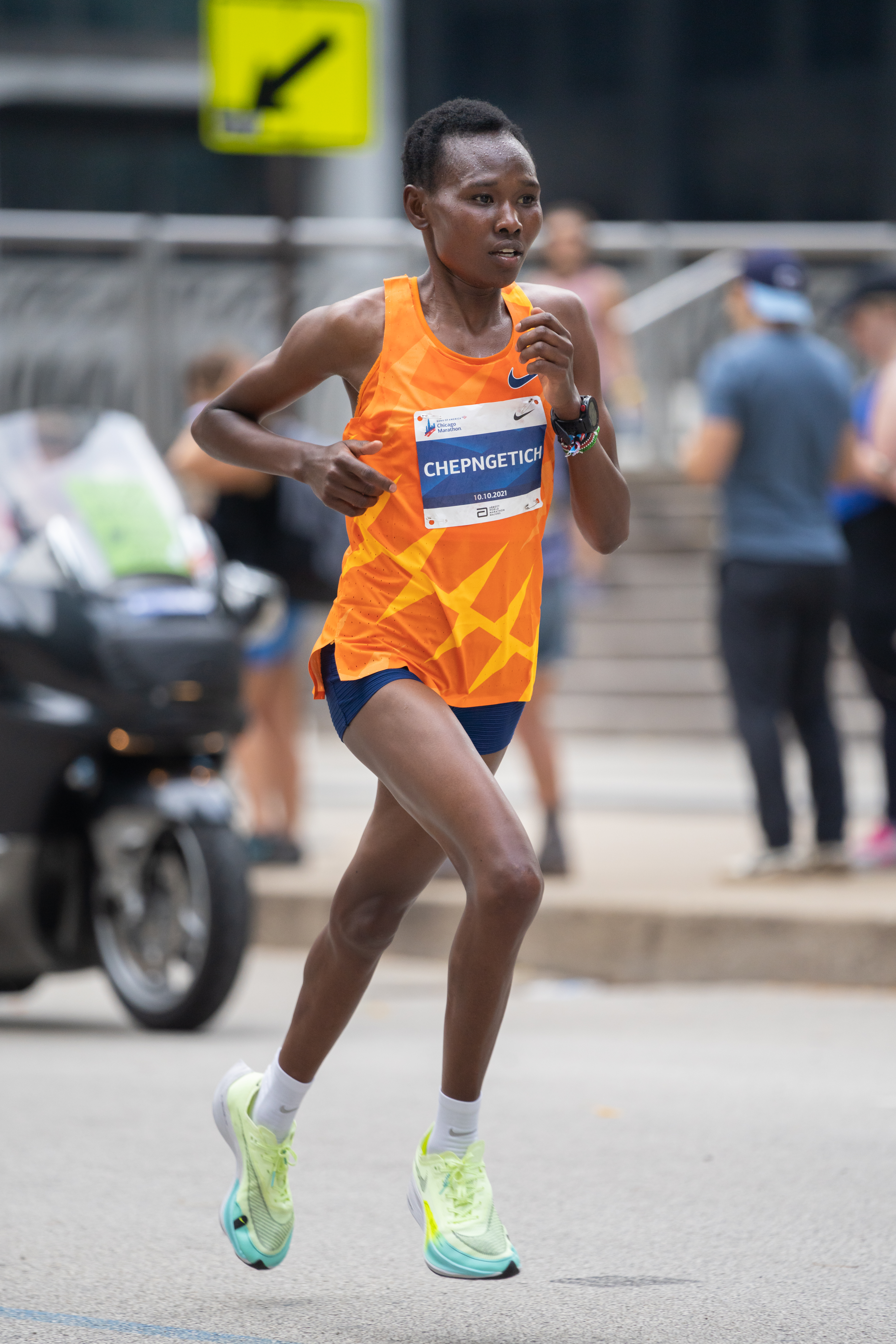
Defending champion Ruth Chepng'etich during the 2021 race, which she also won

Benson Kipruto of Kenya, who won the previous year's race with a time of 2:04:24, returned to defend his title. Joining him was his 23-year-old compatriot (and, at the time, second-fastest male marathoner ever) Kelvin Kiptum, who won the 2023 London Marathon months earlier with a time of 2:01:25. (Note: At the time of the London Marathon, the world record was 2:01:09, set by Eliud Kipchoge at the 2022 Berlin Marathon.) Belgian runner Bashir Abdi, who won the bronze medal at the men's marathon event of the 2020 Olympics, also made an appearance.

Kenyan runner Ruth Chepng'etich was the defending champion (and, at the time, third-fastest female marathoner ever), who won the race in 2022 with a time of 2:14:18. (Note: At the time of the previous year's race, the world record was 2:14:04, set by Brigid Kosgei at the same race three years earlier.) U.S. runner Emily Sisson, the runner-up in 2022 who also set the U.S. marathon record of 2:18:29 during that race, also returned for the race. Dutch runner Sifan Hassan, who debuted at the marathon distance by winning the London Marathon earlier that year, was also part of the elite field for the race.

Swiss wheelchair athlete Marcel Hug, the previous year's champion, returned to defend his title. Daniel Romanchuk and Aaron Pike of the United States, and Sho Watanabe of Japan, who placed second, third, and fourth in 2022, respectively, all returned for the race. Susannah Scaroni of the United States returned to defend her title, with her compatriot Tatyana McFadden who sought to secure her tenth Chicago Marathon victory, and Manuela Schär of Switzerland who aimed to earn her third. Swiss wheelchair athlete Catherine Debrunner made her U.S. race debut in this marathon, two weeks after setting the world record at the 2023 Berlin Marathon with a time of 1:34:16.

== Race ==
=== Men's race ===
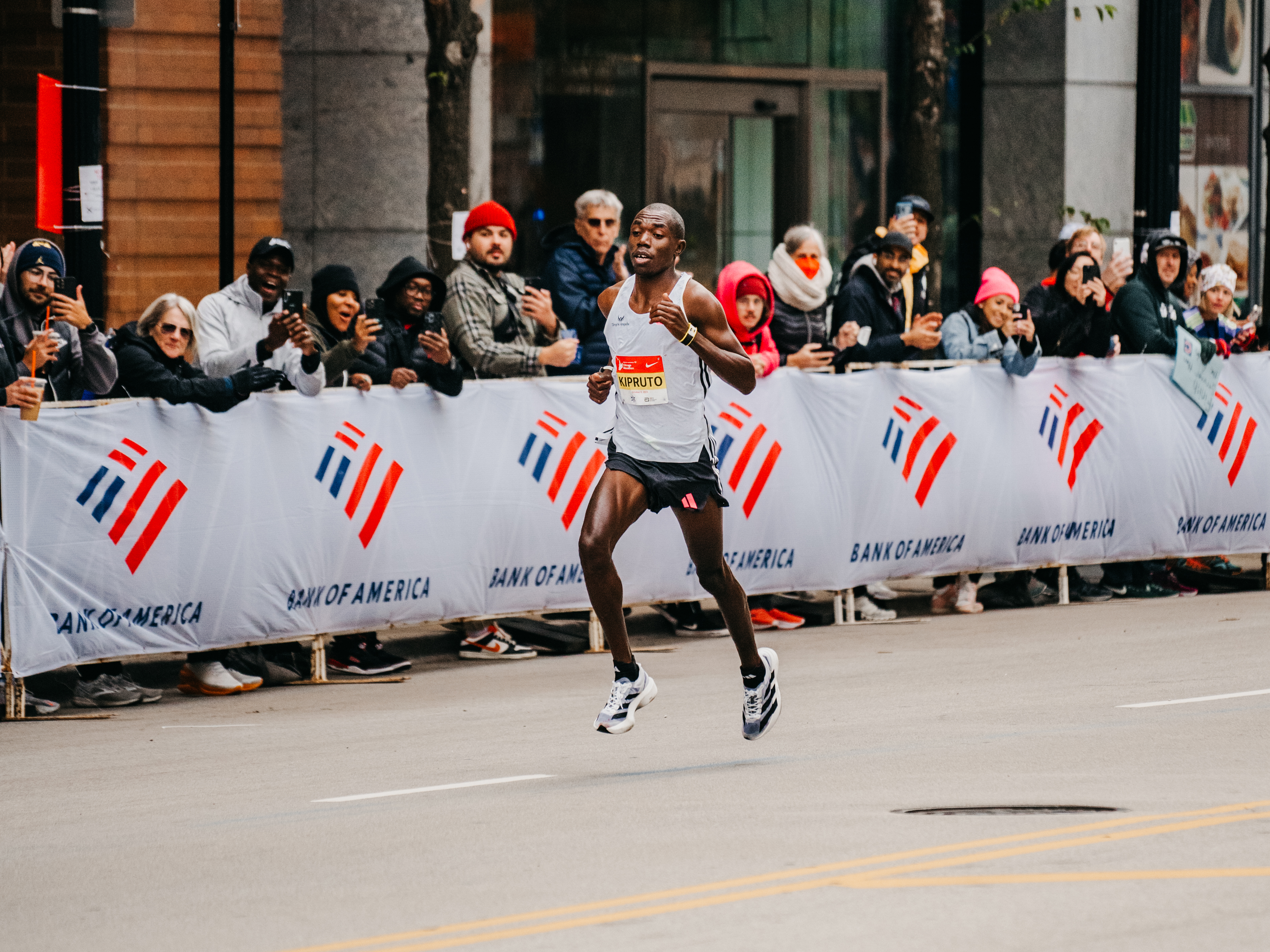
Runner-up Benson Kipruto, during the race

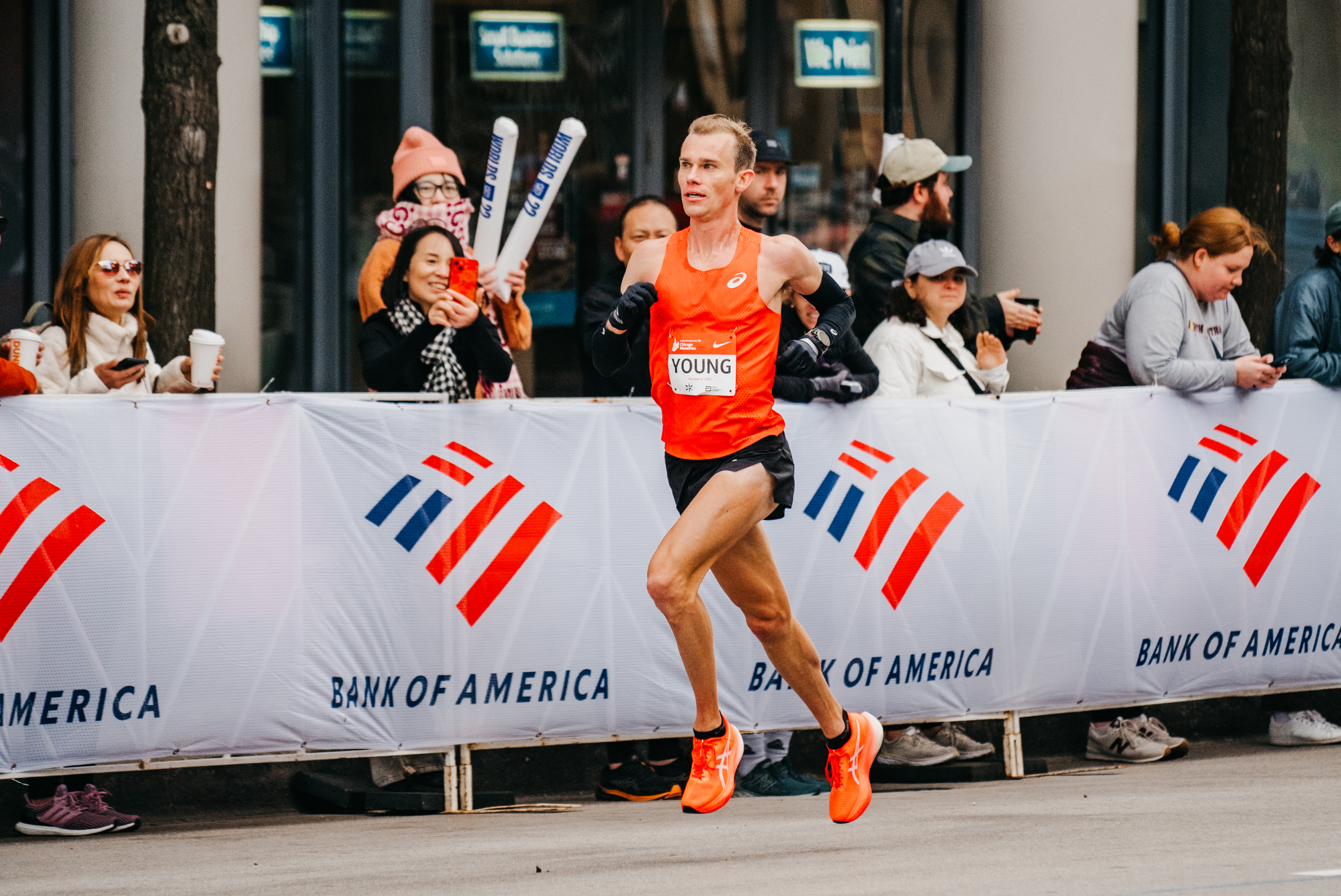
Clayton Young, seventh-place finisher

Seven contenders and a number of pacemakers were a part of the lead pack when it passed the 5 km (3.1 mi) mark in 14:26. Kelvin Kiptum broke away from the group shortly afterward, with only two other runners keeping up with him: his compatriot and first-time marathon runner Daniel Mateiko, and pacemaker Ronald Kirui. (Note: Mateiko had been one of Kiptum's pacemakers during the 2022 London Marathon, and had paced him up to the 30 km (19 mi) mark then.) Kiptum, Mateiko, and Kirui passed the 10 km (6.2 mi) mark in world record pace with a time of 28:42. Kirui was having trouble keeping up with the other two, and fell back shortly before completing the first half. Kiptum and Mateiko had fallen slightly behind world record pace when they crossed the halfway mark at 1:00:48. After Kiptum and Mateiko crossed the 30 km (19 mi) mark together with a time of 1:26:31, Kiptum broke away from Mateiko.

Quickening his step, Kiptum then posted a 5 km (3.1 mi) split time of 13:51, bringing him to the 35 km (22 mi) mark in 1:40:22, slightly faster than world record pace. Mateiko was only able to cross that mark 49 seconds later. Kiptum then slipped slightly from his blistering pace, reaching the 40 km (25 mi) mark in 1:54:23 with a 5 km (3.1 mi) split time of 14:01. He then accelerated again near the end of the race, crossing the finish line with a world record time of 2:00:35, breaking Eliud Kipchoge's previous world record by 34 seconds.

Having run the second half of the race in 59:47, Kiptum had completed the race with a significant negative split. (Note: At the time, the fastest time recorded for the second half of a marathon was 59:45, which Kiptum had set himself in the 2023 London Marathon.) He ran the final 0.352 km (0.2188 mi) of the race in 61 seconds. Kiptum later stated that he has never felt any pain during any of the three marathons he has run so far. He also stated that he realized by the 5 km (3.1 mi) mark that he was going to break the world record that day.

Defending champion Benson Kipruto was over three minutes behind, finishing the race in second place with a personal best time of 2:04:02. Kipruto had broken off from the chase group after the 35 km (22 mi) mark. Olympic bronze medallist Bashir Abdi took the bronze in this race as well, crossing the finish line with a time of 2:04:32. Mateiko ended up dropping out of the race around the 38 km (24 mi) mark.

Two Americans secured a place for the United States in the Olympic Marathon in 2024. Chicago is a qualifying race for the Olympics, where timed nationals may secure a place for a national in the Olympics. Sixth-place finisher Conner Mantz (2:07:47) and seventh-place finisher Clayton Young (2:08) ran sufficiently fast races to open spots for at least two Americans in the 2024 Olympics Marathon.

=== Women's race ===
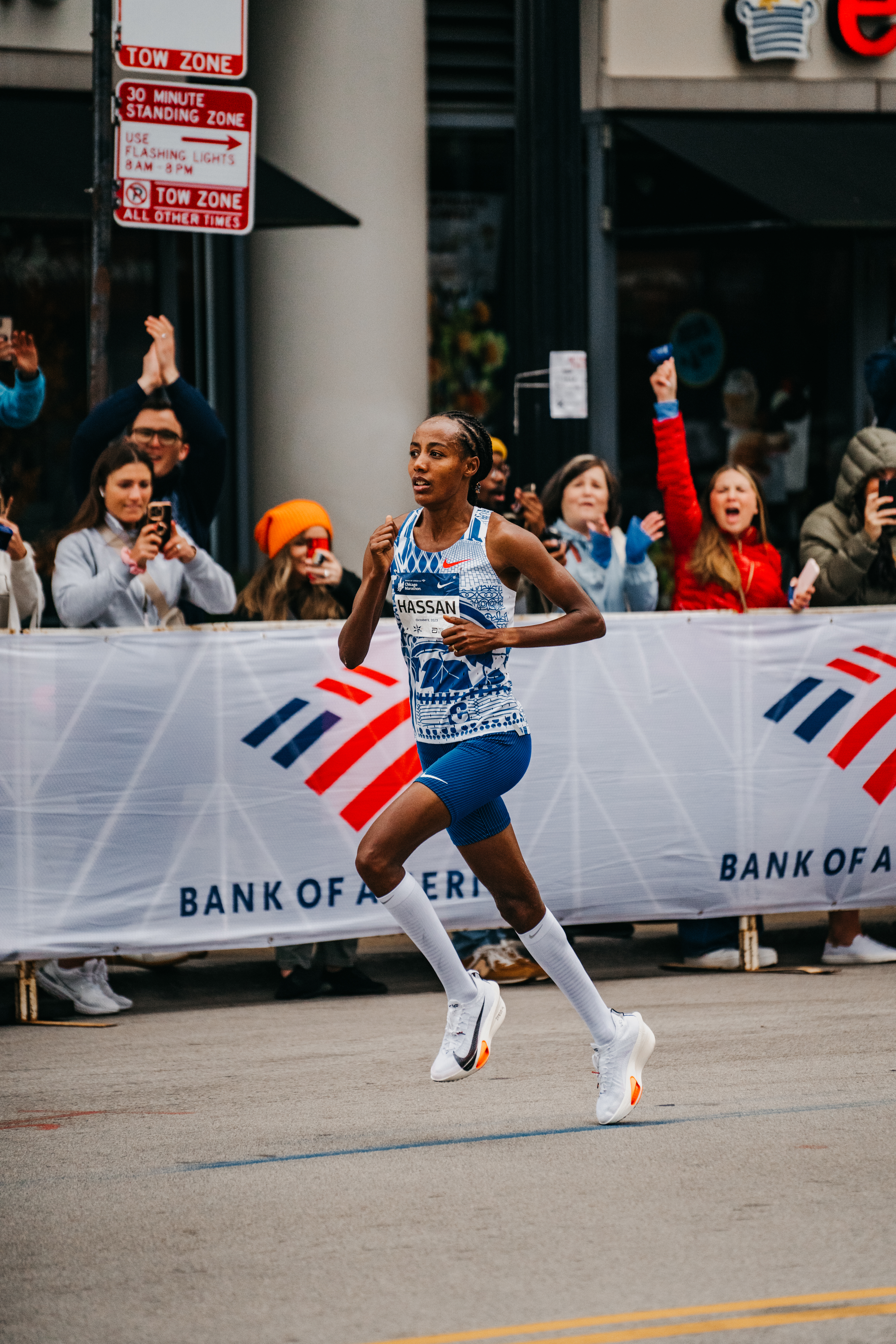
Winner Sifan Hassan, during the race

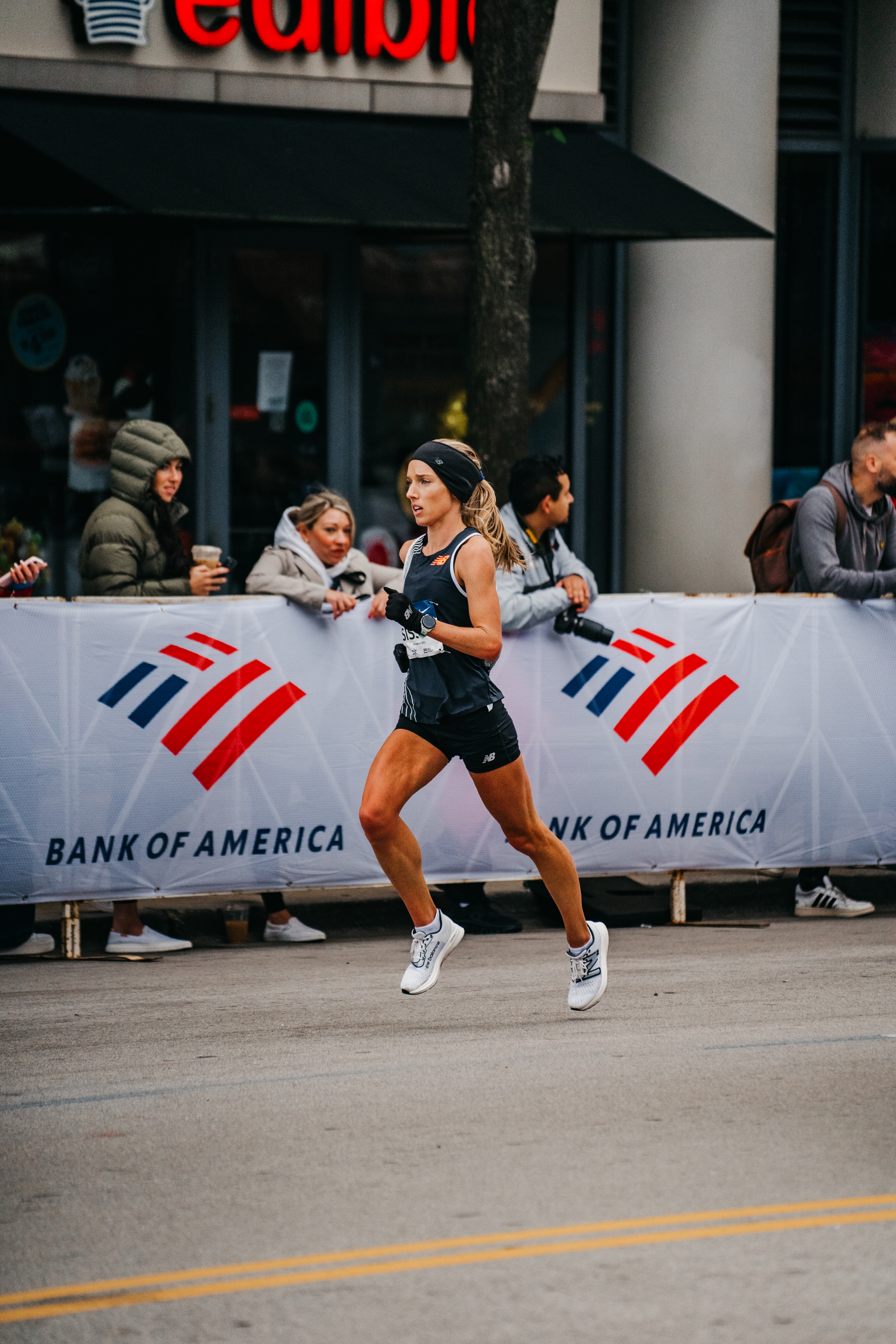
Emily Sisson, seventh-place finisher

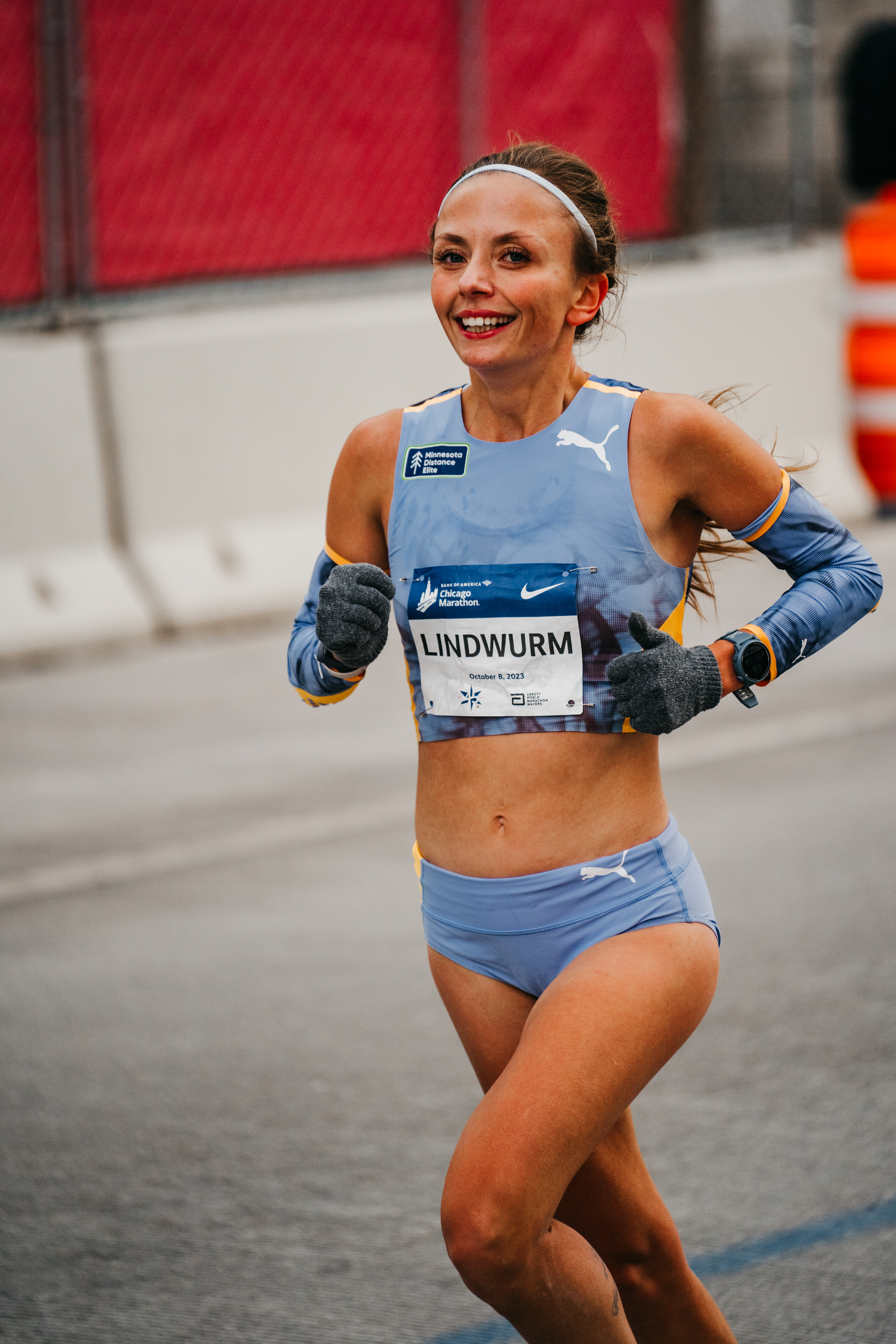
Dakotah Lindwurm, twelfth-place finisher

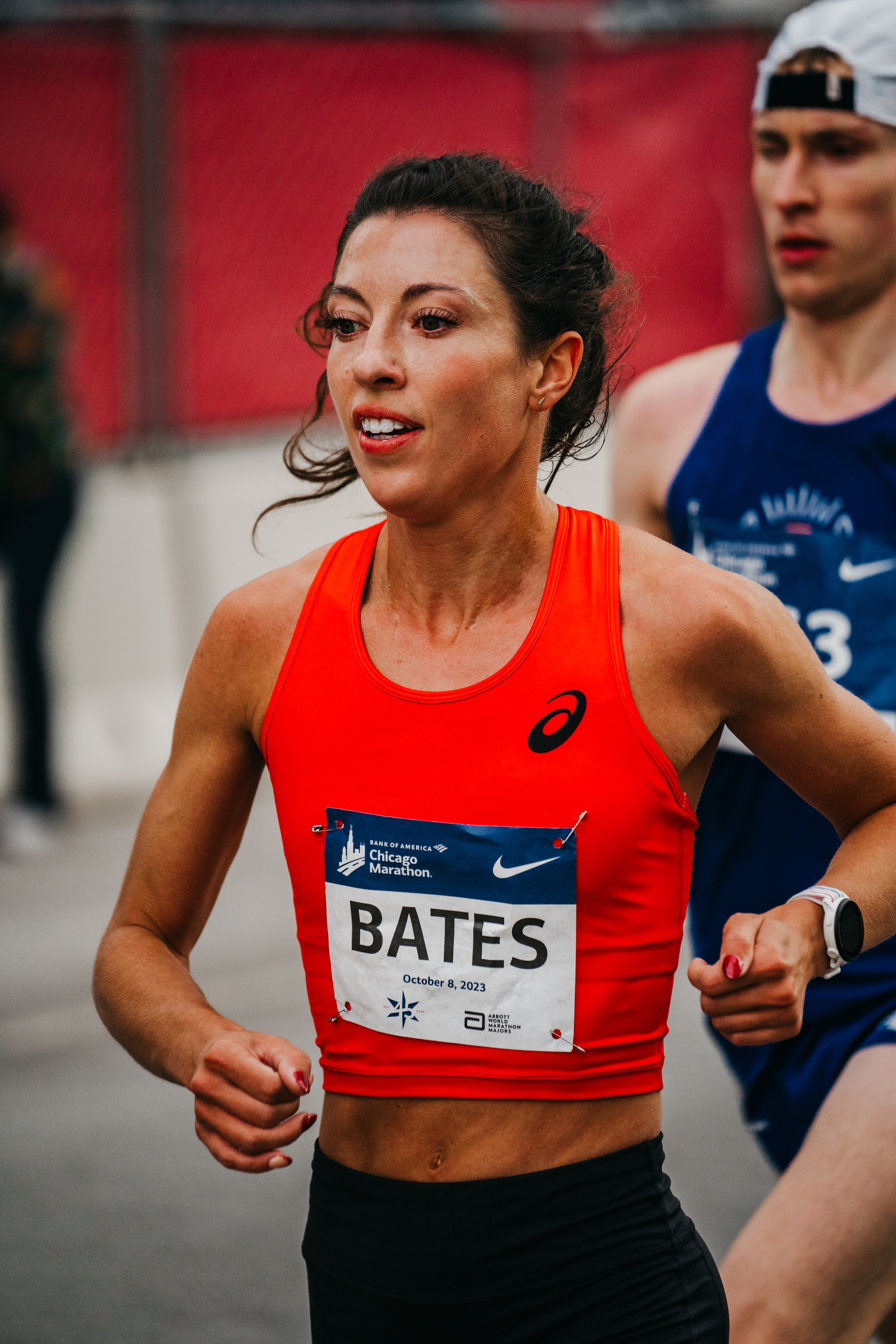
Emma Bates, thirteenth-place finisher

Defending champion Ruth Chepng'etich set a quick pace early on with Sifan Hassan, who was running her second marathon. The two formed a lead pack with Hassan's personal pacemaker Reid Buchanan and two other pacemakers provided by the marathon organizers. Together, they reached the 10 km (6.2 mi) mark in 31:05, forty seconds faster than Tigst Assefa did when she set the world record in Berlin two weeks earlier. Chepng'etich had begun to break away from Hassan before the 20 km (12 mi) mark, and reached the halfway point at 1:05:42, six seconds before Hassan did at 1:05:48. Hassan eventually caught back up with Chepng'etich, passing the 25 km (16 mi) mark with her at 1:18:06. She soon broke off from Chepng'etich, as well as from her own pacer Buchanan, about 26 km (16 mi) into the race.

Although Hassan slowed down during the second half of the race, and also missed a bottle around the 30 km (19 mi) mark and ended up looping back to get it, none of the other contenders posed a serious challenge for her during the rest of the race. She completed the second half in 1:07:56, crossing the finish line with a course record time of 2:13:44. Her performance was the second-fastest marathon by a woman, and had also broken the European record by nearly two minutes. Chepng'etich finished in second place with a time of 2:15:37. Taking third place was Ethiopian runner Megertu Alemu with a time of 2:17:09. Emily Sisson, the runner-up in 2022, finished in seventh place with a time of 2:22:09.

=== Wheelchair races ===
Defending champion Marcel Hug did not really face any competition during the race, breaking away from the other athletes right from the start. The race ended up being essentially a time trial for Hug, and he broke the course record, which he had set himself the previous year, by almost three minutes. He completed the marathon in 1:22:37, nearly nine minutes faster than anyone else. The race was Hug's fourth Chicago Marathon victory. Daniel Romanchuk and Dutch athlete Jetze Plat found some competition, and a close race for second place found Romanchuk finishing in 1:31:34, seconds faster than Plat's time of 1:31:40.

The two leading women, defending champion Susannah Scaroni and world record holder Catherine Debrunner, were dueling throughout the race, with the lead switching between the two until Debrunner grabbed it in the final mile and broke off from Scaroni when turning into Columbus Drive for the final stretch. Sprinting to the finish line, Debrunner set a new course record of 1:38:44. Scaroni followed two seconds behind, finishing in 1:38:46. The race for third place was also similarly close, with Tatyana McFadden claiming bronze with a time of 1:41:17, followed closely behind by Manuela Schär with a time of 1:41:19, and Brazilian athlete Aline Rocha with a time of 1:41:24.

== Finishers ==
Of the 48,398 runners who finished, 25,735 were male, 22,526 were female, 91 were non-binary, and 46 did not have a gender specified. Of the 45 wheelchair athletes who finished, 26 were male and 19 were female. U.S. runner Jake Caswell, who won the non-binary division of the 2022 New York City Marathon, also claimed victory in the Chicago Marathon, winning with a time of 2:38:05. It was the second time the Chicago Marathon was held with a non-binary division; Blank Bruno had won the division the previous year with a time of 2:47:12.

The last time the marathon had this many participants was in 2019, when 45,956 runners completed the marathon. Due to the coronavirus pandemic, the race was not held in 2020, and only saw 26,112 and 39,420 finishers in 2021 and 2022, respectively.

== Results ==
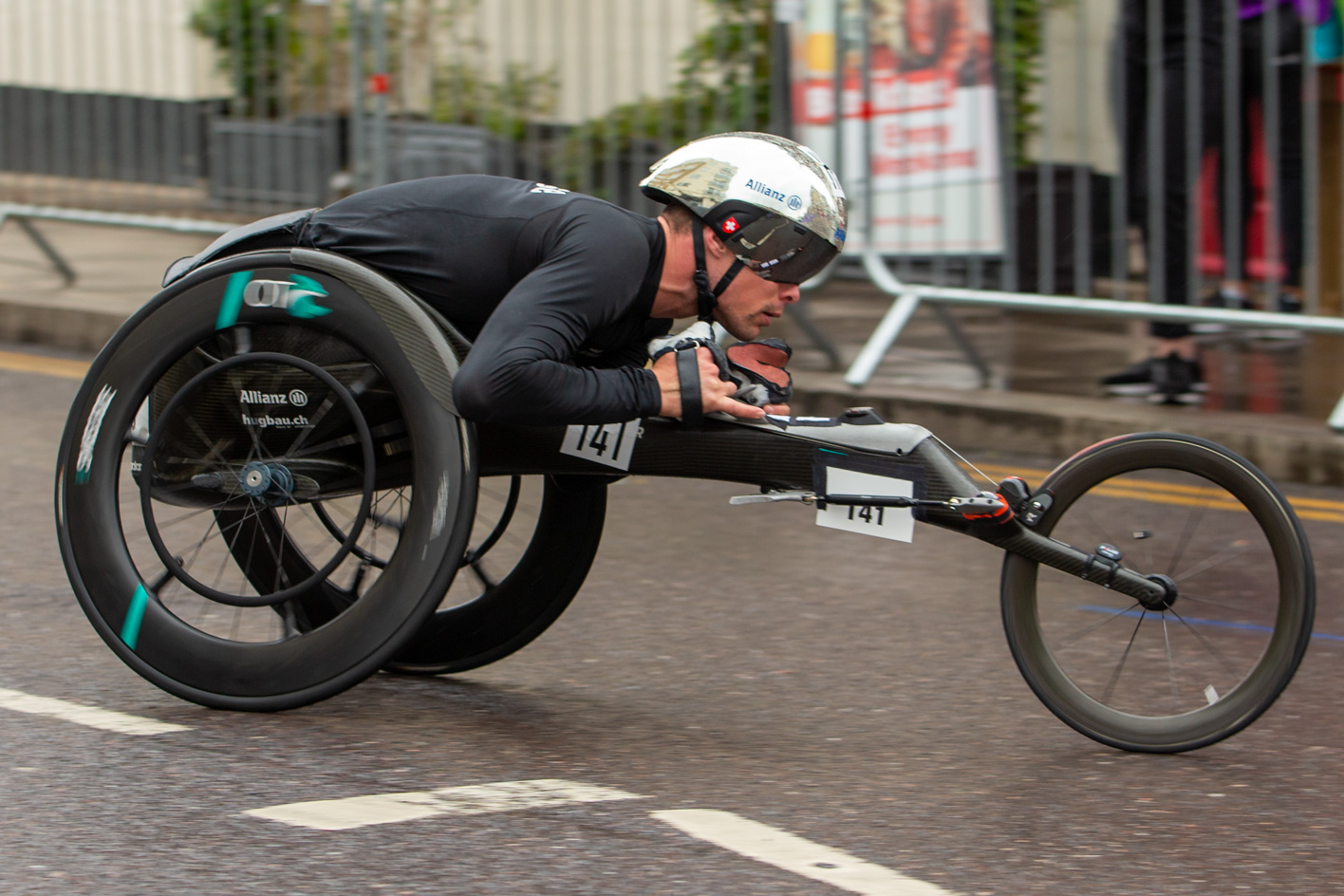
Winner Marcel Hug (pictured here during the 2023 London Marathon)

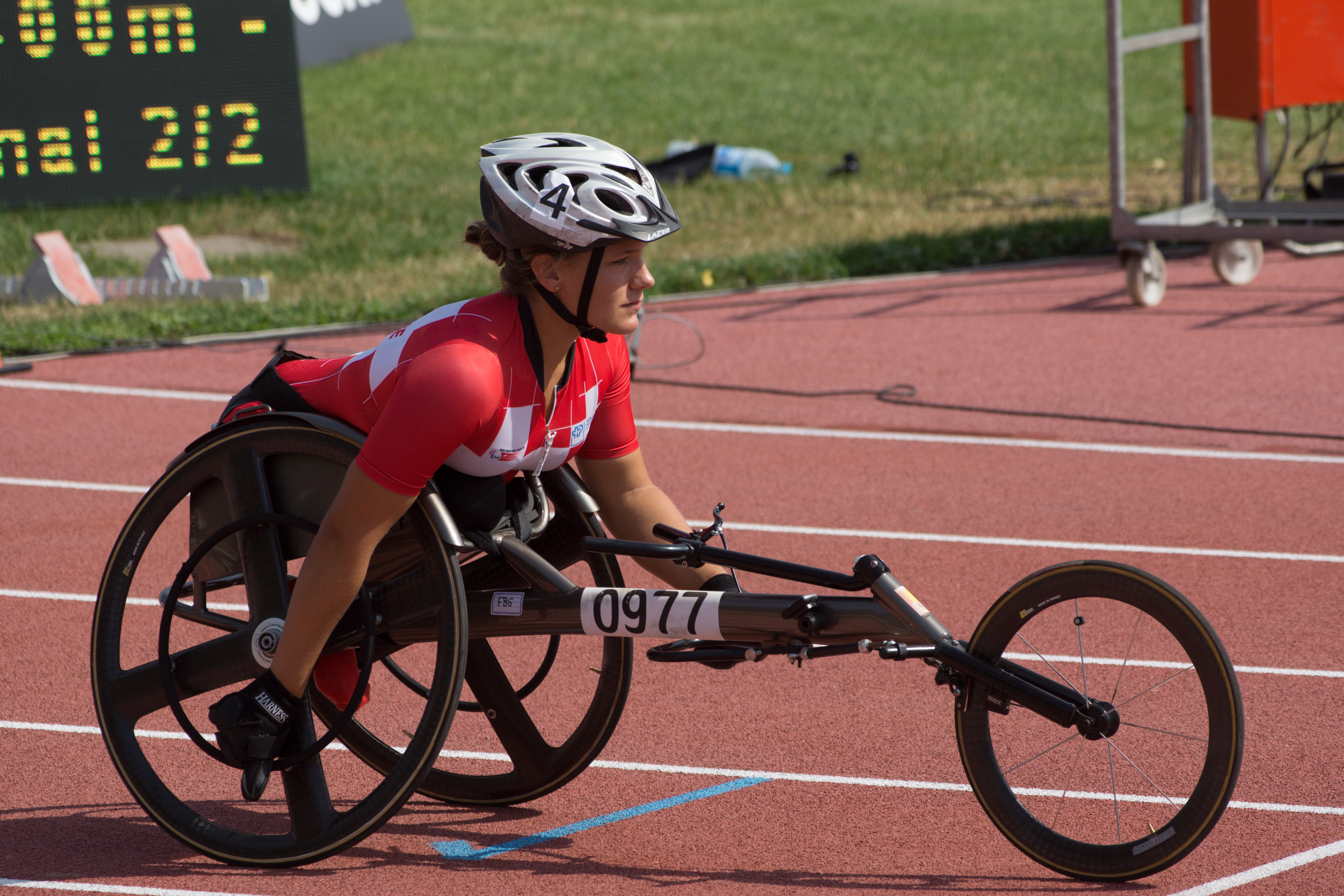
Winner Catherine Debrunner (pictured here in Lyon in 2013)

=== Men ===
Elite men's top 10 finishers
Position	Athlete	Nationality	Time
1st place, gold medalist(s)	Kelvin Kiptum	Kenya	02:00:35 WR
2nd place, silver medalist(s)	Benson Kipruto	Kenya	02:04:02
3rd place, bronze medalist(s)	Bashir Abdi	Belgium	02:04:32
4	John Korir	Kenya	02:05:09
5	Seifu Tura Abdiwak	Ethiopia	02:05:29
6	Conner Mantz	United States	02:07:47
7	Clayton Young	United States	02:08:00
8	Galen Rupp	United States	02:08:48
9	Sam Chelanga	United States	02:08:50
10	Takashi Ichida	Japan	02:08:57

=== Women ===
Elite women's top 10 finishers
Position	Athlete	Nationality	Time
1st place, gold medalist(s)	Sifan Hassan	Netherlands	02:13:44 CR
2nd place, silver medalist(s)	Ruth Chepngetich	Kenya	02:15:37
3rd place, bronze medalist(s)	Megertu Alemu	Ethiopia	02:17:09
4	Joyciline Jepkosgei	Kenya	02:17:23
5	Tadu Teshome Nare	Ethiopia	02:20:04
6	Genzebe Dibaba Keneni	Ethiopia	02:21:47
7	Emily Sisson	United States	02:22:09
8	Molly Seidel	United States	02:23:07
9	Rose Harvey	United Kingdom	02:23:21
10	Sara Vaughn	United States	02:23:24
