= Jake Caswell =

U.S. long-distance runner

Jacob Caswell
Personal information
- Nationality: United States
- Born: 1997 or 1998

Sport
- Sport: Athletics
- Events: Half marathon; marathon
Medal record
World Marathon Majors
Gold medal – first place	2022 New York City	Marathon
Gold medal – first place	2023 Chicago	Marathon

Jacob Caswell is an American long-distance runner and clinical analyst. They won the non-binary division of the 2022 New York City Marathon and the 2023 Chicago Marathon.

== Early life and education ==
Caswell was born to Micki Kastenschmidt and Von Caswell, and grew up in Berlin, Wisconsin. They competed in track and field as well as cross country events as a student of Berlin High School, and, at the time, had a personal best time of 4:19 for the mile run.

Caswell matriculated at Columbia College in Columbia University as a member of the class of 2020. They studied biology at the university, and competed in middle-distance races during all four years there. Caswell later obtained a master's degree in public health.

== Career ==
Caswell competed in the New York City Half Marathon in 2022, the first year it had a non-binary division, which they won with a time of 1:12:20. They then made their marathon debut at the 2022 Brooklyn Marathon, winning its first non-binary division with a time of 2:35:17. They also won the Brooklyn Half Marathon organized by New York Road Runners (NYRR), competing in its inaugural non-binary division. Caswell then competed in the 2022 New York City Marathon's non-binary division, winning it with a time of 2:45:12. (Note: The first year the New York City Marathon had a non-binary division was in 2021. In 2022, the New York City Marathon became the first of the races in the World Marathon Majors to award cash prizes to runners in the non-binary division.) On February 2, 2023, NYRR honored Caswell as one of the Fred Lebow Runners of the Year. It was the first year NYRR awarded the honor to a male runner, a female runner, and a non-binary runner.

Caswell won the non-binary division of the 2023 Chicago Marathon with a finish time of 2:38:05.
