= Guangzhou Marathon =

Annual race in China held since 2012

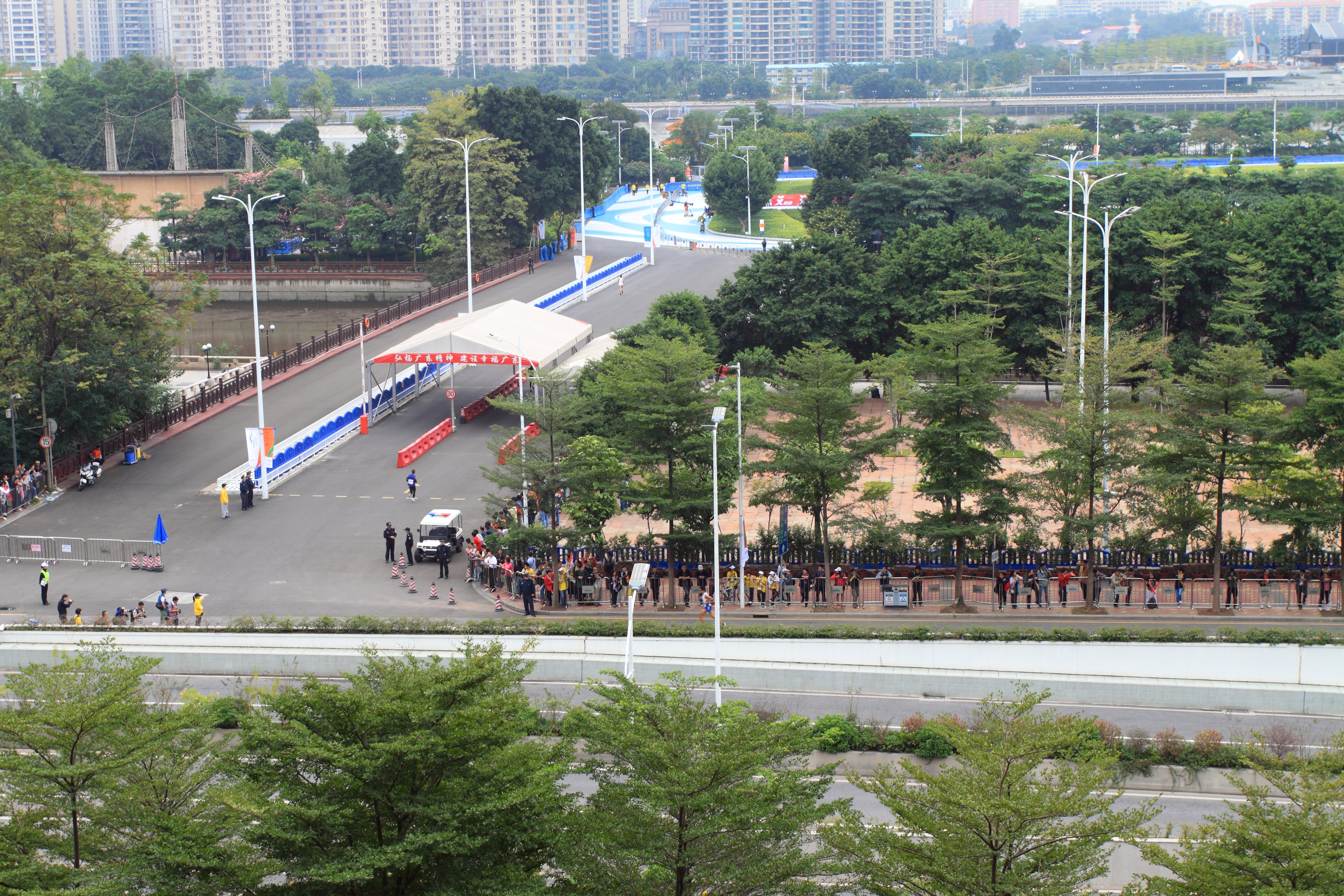
- Entering Haixinsha Island on the Pearl River in 2012
- Date: December
- Location: Guangzhou, Guangdong, China
- Event type: Road
- Distance: Marathon
- Established: 2012 (14 years ago)
- Course records: Men: 2:06:28 (2024) (Ethiopia) Gebise Debele; Women: 2:23:50 (2019) (Ethiopia) Hiwot Gebrekidan
- Participants: ~20,000 (2020)

The Guangzhou Marathon is an annual marathon race held in December in the city of Guangzhou, China, since 2012. The marathon is categorized as a Gold Label Road Race by World Athletics.

== History ==
The event was first held on 18 November 2012. Two people died during the event: a 21-year-old male student died after completing the 10 km race and a 25 year old real estate agent collapsed before completing the 5 km race.

In 2015, Sentayehu Merga Ejigu crossed the finish line first with a course record time of 2:09:57, but was later disqualified for failing an in-competition drug test. This led to the promotion of the second runner to cross the finish line, Abdellah Tagharrafet, to first place. He too had broken the course record, with a time of 2:10:01, but he too was later disqualified for doping. (Note: Although his disqualification occurred as early as 27 October 2017 for results as far back as 10 September 2009, various sources still recognized him as the course record holder until his illegitimate time was broken in 2019.) As a result, the third runner to cross the finish line, Ethiopian Raji Assefa, was then promoted to first place. (Note: His finish time of 2:11:46, however, did not break the course record at the time, which was 2:11:05.)

In 2019, Gebretsadik Abraha Adihana won the men's race with a time of 2:08:04 and Hiwot Gebrekidan won the women's race with a new course record of 2:23:50.

In 2020, during the coronavirus pandemic, only runners who resided in areas of mainland China, Hong Kong, Macau, or Taiwan that were deemed to be at low risk for the virus were allowed to participate. (Note: If a runner's low-risk area became a medium- or high-risk area between the time of registration and race day, the organizers would either defer the runner's entry to 2021 or provide a refund.) In addition, the marathon was the only distance offered that year. (Note: Previous years included a half marathon.) A year later, the 2021 Guangzhou Marathon was postponed due to the coronavirus pandemic.

In 2024, Gebise Debele won the men's race with a new course record of 2:06:28 and Anchialem Haymanot won the women's race with a time of 2:25:13.

== Guangzhou Huangpu Marathon ==
A separate marathon is also held in Huangpu, Guangzhou later in December. As of 2024, while the Guangzhou Marathon is a Gold label World Athletics race, the Guangzhou Huangpu Marathon is only classified as Elite level.

== Course ==
External image
- Course map of full marathon in 2020

Beginning at Tianhe Stadium, the marathon initially heads south to the Pearl River. The course then largely runs along both sides of the river, with the rest of the first half mostly either on or east of the Liede Bridge, and most of the rest of the second half west of the bridge. The last few kilometres are run on Ersha Island and Haixinsha Island before entering Huacheng Square for the finish.

== Winners ==
Key: Course record (in bold)

Ed.	Date	Men's winner	Time	Women's winner	Time	Rf.
1	18 November 2012	Bekana Daba (ETH)	2:11:05	Mulu Seboka (ETH)	2:26:46	
2	24 November 2013	Sisay Jisa (ETH)	2:11:25	Goitetom Haftu Tesema (ETH)	2:39:17	
3	23 November 2014	Deressa Chimsa (ETH)	2:13:08	Agnes Jeruto Barsosio (KEN)	2:31:17	
4	6 December 2015	Raji Assefa (ETH) (Note: Sentayehu Merga Ejigu finished in 2:09:57 and Abdellah Tagharrafet finished in 2:10:01, but both were disqualified for doping.)	2:11:46	Tizita Terecha (ETH)	2:28:02	
5	11 December 2016	Salah-Eddine Bounasr (MAR)	2:11:09	Aynalem Kassahun (ETH)	2:31:52	
6	10 December 2017	Dickson Tuwei (KEN)	2:10:03	Rahma Tusa (ETH)	2:25:12	
7	9 December 2018	Mohamed Ziani (MAR)	2:10:44	Tigist Girma (ETH)	2:26:44	
8	8 December 2019	Gebretsadik Abraha (ETH)	2:08:04	Hiwot Gebrekidan (ETH)	**2:23:50**	
9	13 December 2020	Jia'e Renjia (CHN)	2:15:08	Ding Changqin (CHN)	2:35:21	
10	10 December 2023	Moses Kibet (KEN)	2:09:02	Gutemi Shone Imana (ETH)	2:28:30	
11	8 December 2024	Gebise Debele (ETH)	**2:06:28**	Anchialem Haymanot (ETH)	2:25:13	

=== By country ===
Country	Total	Men's	Women's
Ethiopia	15	6	9
Kenya	3	2	1
China	2	1	1
Morocco	2	2	0
