= Salah-Eddine Bounasr =

Moroccan long-distance runner

Personal information
- Born: 27 September 1990 (age 35)

Sport
- Country: Morocco
- Sport: Athletics
- Event: Long-distance running

Salah-Eddine Bounasr (born 27 September 1990) is a Moroccan long-distance runner.

== Career ==
In 2016, he won the Guangzhou Marathon with a time of 2:11:09.

In 2017, he became the first Moroccan athlete to win the Beijing Marathon.

In 2019, he won the Lake Biwa Marathon held in Ōtsu, Shiga, Japan with a new personal best of 2:07:52.

== Achievements ==
Year	Competition	Venue	Position	Event	Notes
Representing Morocco
2016	Guangzhou Marathon	Guangzhou, China	1st	Marathon	2:11:09
2017	Marrakech Marathon	Marrakesh, Morocco	3rd	Marathon	2:10:25
2017	Prague Marathon	Prague, Czech Republic	5th	Marathon	2:10:04
2017	Beijing Marathon	Beijing, China	1st	Marathon	2:11:18
2018	Vienna City Marathon	Vienna, Austria	1st	Marathon	2:09:29
2019	Lake Biwa Marathon	Ōtsu, Japan	1st	Marathon	2:07:52
