= 2012 World Junior Championships in Athletics – Women's 3000 metres =

The women's 3000 metres at the 2012 World Junior Championships in Athletics will be held at the Estadi Olímpic Lluís Companys on 10 July.

== Medalists ==
Gold	Silver	Bronze
Mercy Chebwogen; Kenya	Hiwot Gebrekidan; Ethiopia	Emelia Gorecka; Great Britain

== Records ==
Prior to the competition, the existing world junior and championship records were as follows.

World Junior Record	Zola Pieterse (GBR)	8:28.85	Rome, Italy	7 September 1985
Championship Record	Zhang Linli (CHN)	8:46.86	Seoul, South Korea	20 September 1992
World Junior Leading	Nancy Chepkwemoi (KEN)	8:56.52	Doha, Qatar	11 May 2012

== Results ==
Rank	Name	Nationality	Time	Note
1st place, gold medalist(s)	Mercy Chebwogen	Kenya	9:08.88	PB
2nd place, silver medalist(s)	Hiwot Gebrekidan	Ethiopia	9:09.27	PB
3rd place, bronze medalist(s)	Emelia Gorecka	Great Britain	9:09.43	PB
4	Haftamnesh Tesfay	Ethiopia	9:10.02	PB
5	Brillian Jepkorir Kipkoech	Kenya	9:14.32	PB
6	Aisling Cuffe	United States	9:19.95	
7	Rebekah Greene	New Zealand	9:21.23	PB
8	Miyuki Uehara	Japan	9:21.81	
9	Lindsay Crevoiserat	United States	9:21.88	PB
10	Li Zhixuan	China	9:24.06	PB
11	Liv Westphal	France	9:24.10	PB
12	Mariia Khodakivska	Ukraine	9:25.98	
13	Sarah Collins	Ireland	9:26.26	PB
14	Wu Xufeng	China	9:27.89	PB
15	Cleo Boyd	Canada	9:37.84	
16	Laura Muir	Great Britain	9:40.81	
17	Misuzu Nakahara	Japan	9:49.84	
18	Karoline Egeland Skatteboe	Norway	9:59.69	
19	Stessy Ngouvi Bouanga	Gabon	13:54.15	PB
–	Nancy Cheptegei	Uganda	–	DNS

== Participation ==
According to an unofficial count, 19 athletes from 13 countries participated in the event.

- Canada (1)
- China (2)
- Ethiopia (2)
- France (1)
- Gabon (1)
- Ireland (1)
- Japan (2)
- Kenya (2)
- New Zealand (1)
- Norway (1)
- Ukraine (1)
- United Kingdom (2)
- United States (2)
