= Raji Assefa =

Ethiopian long-distance runner

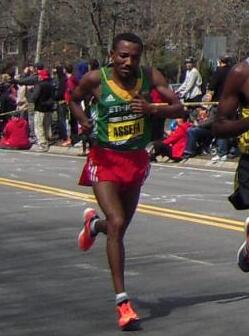
- Assefa in the 2013 Boston Marathon

Personal information
- Full name: Raji Assefa Worku
- Born: 1986 (age 38–39)

Sport
- Country: Ethiopia
- Sport: Long-distance running

Raji Assefa Worku (born 1986) is an Ethiopian long-distance runner.

In 2008, he competed at the 2008 IAAF World Half Marathon Championships held in Rio de Janeiro, Brazil. He finished in 14th place.

In 2012, he competed in the men's half marathon at the 2012 IAAF World Half Marathon Championships held in Kavarna, Bulgaria. He did not finish his race.

In 2015, he won the men's race at the Guangzhou Marathon held in Guangzhou, China.
