= Fiona Benson =

Fiona Benson may refer to:

- Fiona Benson (athlete) (born 1992), Canadian middle-distance runner
- Fiona Benson (poet) (born 1978), English poet
