= Tadu Teshome Nare =

Ethiopian runner (born 2001)

Personal information
- Citizenship: Ethiopian
- Born: 9 June 2001 (age 25)

Sport
- Country: Ethiopia
- Sport: Running
- Club: Nedbank

Tadu Teshome Nare (born 9 June 2001) is an Ethiopian runner who finished fifth at the 2023 Chicago Marathon, and has won multiple seasons of the South African SPAR Grand Prix 10km series.

== Career ==
Nare has competed for Nedbank Running Club in South Africa. In 2021, Nare won her debut marathon, the Barcelona Marathon. In 2022, she won the Copenhagen Half Marathon and Valencia Marathon, the latter with the 12th fastest time in history. That year, she also won the overall title at the South African SPAR Grand Prix 10km series. She won five of the six events in the series.

In 2023, she finished fifth at the Chicago Marathon, eighth at the London Marathon and sixth in the Shanghai Marathon. Nare won the 2023 SPAR Grand Prix series, after winning four of the first six events; she set a course record at the event in Mbombela. Nare missed the first event of the series to compete at the London Marathon and she also chose to miss the final event of the series in Johannesburg to prepare for the Chicago Marathon.

Nare won the Mpumalanga Marathon in 2024, billed as Africa's richest marathon, with a prize money of R1 million. However, she, along with other winners, did not receive any prize money, and criminal charges have been laid against the organiser. Nare had foregone an appearance fee of R750,000 to appear in the Sydney Marathon in order to participate in Mpumalanga.

In June 2025, Nare was served with a 22-month ban to run from February 2025 to December 2026 for an anti-doping rule violation for whereabouts failures (three missed tests).

== Personal life ==
At the age of seven, Nare's family house in Sidama, Ethiopia was destroyed during a severe rainstorm. Nare's leg was injured and doctors recommended amputation, which her family refused.
