= Clayton Young =

American long-distance runner (born 1993)

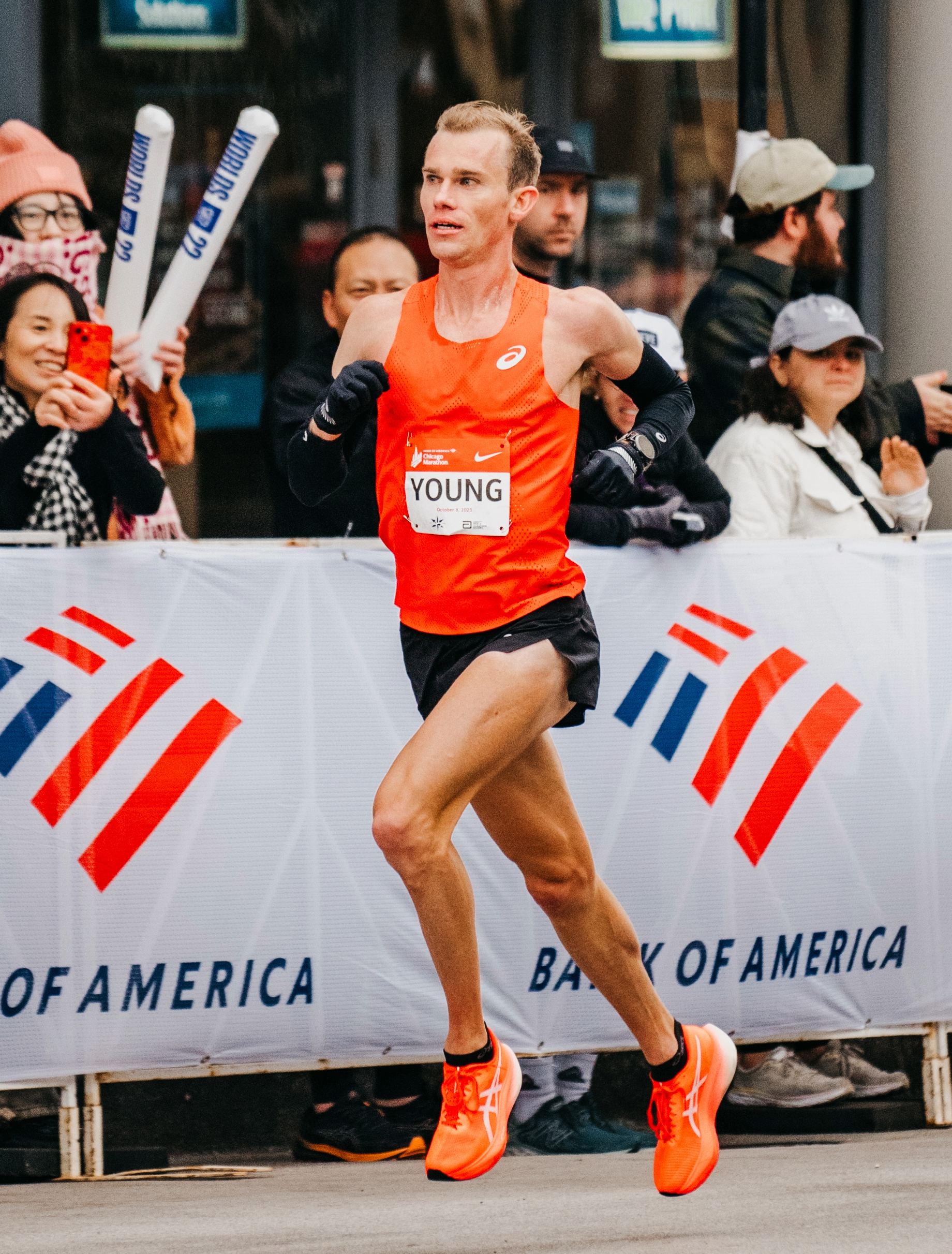
- Young at the 2023 Chicago Marathon

Personal information
- Nationality: American
- Born: September 14, 1993 (age 33) Clovis, California, U.S.
- Home town: American Fork, Utah, U.S.
- Education: Brigham Young University '19; MS in Engineering
- Employer: Engineer at Stryker Corporation
- Height: 183 cm (6 ft 0 in)
- Spouse: Ashley Young
- Residence: Springville, Utah, U.S.

Sport
- Country: United States
- Sport: Track and Field, Road running Cross country running
- Events: 1500m, 5000m, 10,000m, Half marathon, Marathon
- University team: BYU Cougars
- Club: Brooks
- Turned pro: June 2019
- Coached by: Ed Eyestone

Achievements and titles
- Olympic finals: 2024; Marathon, 9th
- World finals: 2025; Marathon, 9th
- Personal bests: Outdoor; 1500 m: 3:48.81 (Azusa 2019); 5000 m: 13:31.79 (Stanford 2019); 10,000 m: 28:18.50 (Stanford 2019); Half marathon: 1:00:52 (Houston, TX 2025); Marathon: 2:05:23 (Chicago 2026)

Clayton Young (born September 14, 1993) is an American long-distance runner, who competes for Brooks Running. He ran collegiately for Brigham Young University, and won the 10,000 metres at the 2019 NCAA Division I Outdoor Track and Field Championships. Young finished second at the 2024 U.S. Olympic Marathon Trials and competed at the 2024 Paris Olympics. He ran his personal best at the 2026 Chicago Marathon, running 2:05:23.

== Running career ==
=== High school and college ===
Young attended American Fork High School in American Fork, Utah. He is a 2011 All-American at the Nike Cross Nationals. He won the 2010 Utah High School Activities Association 5A Cross Country Championship individual title.

While competing for Brigham Young University, he set personal bests of 13:31 for 5000m and 28:18 for 10000m. In 2019, he secured a national title in the 10000m, finishing with a time of 29:16.60.

=== Professional ===
After completing his collegiate eligibility at BYU in June 2019, Young turned professional, signing with Asics. He debuted in the marathon at the 2020 United States Olympic trials (marathon) in Atlanta in a time of 2:29:46, which placed 136th in the field of 235 men.

In his second marathon at the 2021 Chicago Marathon, he set out at 2:12 pace, splitting a time of 1:06:11 through halfway. However over the final few kilometers he faded slightly, still managing a 13 minute personal best finishing in a time of 2:16:07.

Returning Young finished 18th at the 2022 Chicago Marathon in 2:11:51 as the fifth American finisher.

In 2023, he secured national titles in both the 8 km and 20 km US Road Running Championships. At the 2023 Chicago Marathon, Young earned seventh place overall and second American with a time of 2:08:00, a time that met the Olympic qualifying standard of 2:08:10.

Young entered the 2024 United States Olympic trials (marathon) with the second fasted seed time with his 2:08 mark from the 2023 Chicago Marathon. Young was able to stay with the lead pack as several pre-race favourites fell off the pace and by mile 19, the lead pack consisted of just three men: Zach Panning, Young, and his training partner Conner Mantz. Around mile 22, Panning fell off the pace leaving Young and Mantz as the two leaders. The two celebrated their all but certain qualification for the Olympics through the last few miles. At the finish line, Young allowed Mantz to take the win as both men earned a spot to represent the United States at the 2024 Paris Olympics with Young finishing in his second best marathon time ever of 2:09:06 to Mantz's 2:09:05.

At the 2024 Summer Olympics in Paris, Young placed ninth in the marathon, one place behind Conner Mantz. A year later at the 2025 World Championships in Tokyo, Young again placed ninth on the global stage. In 2026, Young switched professional sponsorship from Asics to Brooks, after seven years with Asics.

== Personal life ==
Young took a two-year hiatus from competitive running after high school to serve as a missionary for the Church of Jesus Christ of Latter-day Saints in Raleigh, North Carolina. Upon returning in 2015, Young redshirted his first year at Brigham Young University (BYU). He and his wife have two daughters.

== Social media ==
Ahead of the 2024 Olympic and New York City marathons, Young created a YouTube page documenting his marathon training for Paris. The video series documents his day-to-day life as a pro athlete training for an international event. He has amassed over 40,000 followers since he started posting.

== Achievements ==
Information from athlete's profile on World Athletics, unless otherwise noted.

=== Marathons ===
Year	Competition	Performance	Position	Place	Date
2020	U.S. Olympic Trials	2:29:46	136th	Atlanta, Georgia	February 29, 2020
2021	Chicago Marathon	2:16:07	13th	Chicago, Illinois	October 10, 2021
2022	Chicago Marathon	2:11:51	18th	Chicago, Illinois	October 9, 2022
2023	Chicago Marathon	2:08:00	7th	Chicago, Illinois	October 8, 2023
2024	U.S. Olympic Trials	2:09:06	2nd	Orlando, Florida	February 3, 2024
2024	Paris Olympics	2:08:44	9th	Paris, France	August 10, 2024
2024	New York City Marathon	2:09:21	7th	New York City, New York	November 3, 2024
2025	Boston Marathon	2:07:04	7th	Boston, Massachusetts	April 21, 2025
2025	World Athletics Championships	2:10:43	9th	Tokyo, Japan	September 15, 2025
2026	Boston Marathon	2:05:41	11th	Boston, Massachusetts	April 20, 2026
2026	Chicago Marathon	2:05:23	7th	Chicago, Illinois	October 11, 2026

=== BYU ===
Results sourced from athlete's profile on the Track & Field Results Reporting Service (TFRRS).

Representing BYU Cougars
School Year	West Coast Conference Cross Country Championships	NCAA Cross Country Championships	MPSF Indoor Track Championships	NCAA Indoor Track Championship	NCAA Division I Outdoor Track Championships
2018–19 Senior	11th 24:05.9	72nd 30:25.2	4th 4:00.77; Mile	3rd 7:55.86; 3000 m	1st 29:16.60; 10,000m
2018–19 Senior	11th 24:05.9	72nd 30:25.2	4th 4:00.77; Mile	6th 13:45.35; 5000 m	6th 14:09.00; 5000m
2017–18 Junior	5th 23:29.1	105th 30:47.4	20th 8:09.24; 3000 m		23rd 31:37.54; 10,000m
2017–18 Junior	5th 23:29.1	105th 30:47.4	20th 8:09.24; 3000 m		12th 14:02.17; 5000m
2016–17 Sophomore	7th 24:42.2	23rd 30:43.9	4th 9:50.53; DMR	9th 8:02.11; 3000 m	17th 29:39.80; 10,000m
2016–17 Sophomore	7th 24:42.2	23rd 30:43.9	4th 9:50.53; DMR	9th 8:02.11; 3000 m	10th 14:38.45; 5000m

=== American Fork High School ===
Results sourced from athlete's profile on Athletic.net.

Year	Nike Cross Nationals	Great Southwest T&F Classic	
2011	24th 15:50.0		
2010	96th 17:44.7		3200 m 9:22.92; 1st
2009	61st 16:00.1		
Representing American Fork High School at Utah High School Activities Association
Year	Cross Country class 5A state championship	UHSTCA Indoor Championships	Outdoor Track and Field class 5A state championship
2011–12	15:31.2; 3rd place		3200 m 9:40.47; 13th
2011–12	15:31.2; 3rd place		1600 m 4:26.3; 8th
2010–11	15:23.9; 1st place	3200 m 9:22.92; 2nd	3200 m 9:19.09; 3rd
2010–11	15:23.9; 1st place		1600 m 4:16.21; 3rd
2010–11	15:23.9; 1st place		800 m 1:56.30; 5th
2009–10	15:43.6; 4th place		3200 m 9:13.02; 2nd
2009–10	15:43.6; 4th place		1600 m 4:22.43; 3rd
2009–10	15:43.6; 4th place		800 m 1:55.87; 5th
2008–09	16:56.4; 45th place		3200 m 10:03.44; 12th
