= Hiwot Gebremaryam =

Ethiopian long-distance runner

Personal information
- Nationality: Ethiopian
- Born: Hiwot Gebremaryam; May 11, 1995 (age 31) Ethiopia
- Occupation: Long-distance runner
- Years active: 2012–present

Sport
- Country: Ethiopia
- Sport: Athletics
- Event(s): Marathon, Half marathon

Achievements and titles
- Personal bests: Marathon: 2:17:59 (Valencia, 2023); Half Marathon: 1:06:28 (Houston, 2023)

Hiwot Gebremaryam (born 11 May 1995), also known as Hiwot Gebrekidan, is an Ethiopian long-distance runner who specializes in the marathon and half marathon. She is a former world junior silver medallist on the track and has recorded multiple victories and podium finishes in major international road races.

== Career ==
Gebremaryam first gained international attention at the 2012 World Junior Championships in Barcelona, where she won the silver medal in the women's 3000 metres.

She later transitioned to road racing. In December 2017, she won the Tiberias Marathon in Israel. In 2019, she claimed victory at the Guangzhou Marathon in China, setting a course record of 2:23:50. Later that year, she ran 2:24:25 at the Istanbul Marathon.

In 2018, she placed seventh at the Copenhagen Half Marathon in 1:07:36.

Her breakthrough season came in 2021. In April, she won the Milan Marathon in 2:19:35, setting an Italian all-comers' record. In September, she finished second at the Berlin Marathon in 2:21:23, marking her first podium finish at a World Marathon Majors event.

In January 2023, she won the Houston Half Marathon in a personal best time of 1:06:28. Later that year, she placed third at the 2023 Valencia Marathon, setting a marathon personal best of 2:17:59. She also finished eighth at the 2023 Boston Marathon.

According to World Athletics, Gebremaryam is a gold-label road race athlete and was ranked among the top 110 female road runners worldwide in 2024.

== Personal bests ==
- Marathon: 2:17:59 – Valencia, 2023
- Half marathon: 1:06:28 – Houston, 2023
- 3000 metres: 8:56.50 – Ostrava, 2012

== Major results ==
Year	Competition	Location	Position	Time
2017	Tiberias Marathon	Tiberias, Israel	1st	2:37:00
2018	Copenhagen Half Marathon	Copenhagen, Denmark	7th	1:07:36
2019	Guangzhou Marathon	Guangzhou, China	1st	2:23:50
2019	Istanbul Marathon	Istanbul, Turkey	—	2:24:25
2021	Milan Marathon	Milan, Italy	1st	2:19:35
2021	Berlin Marathon	Berlin, Germany	2nd	2:21:23
2023	Houston Half Marathon	Houston, United States	1st	1:06:28
2023	Valencia Marathon	Valencia, Spain	3rd	2:17:59
2023	Boston Marathon	Boston, United States	8th	2:24:30
