= Copenhagen Half Marathon =

Half marathon race in Copenhagen, Denmark

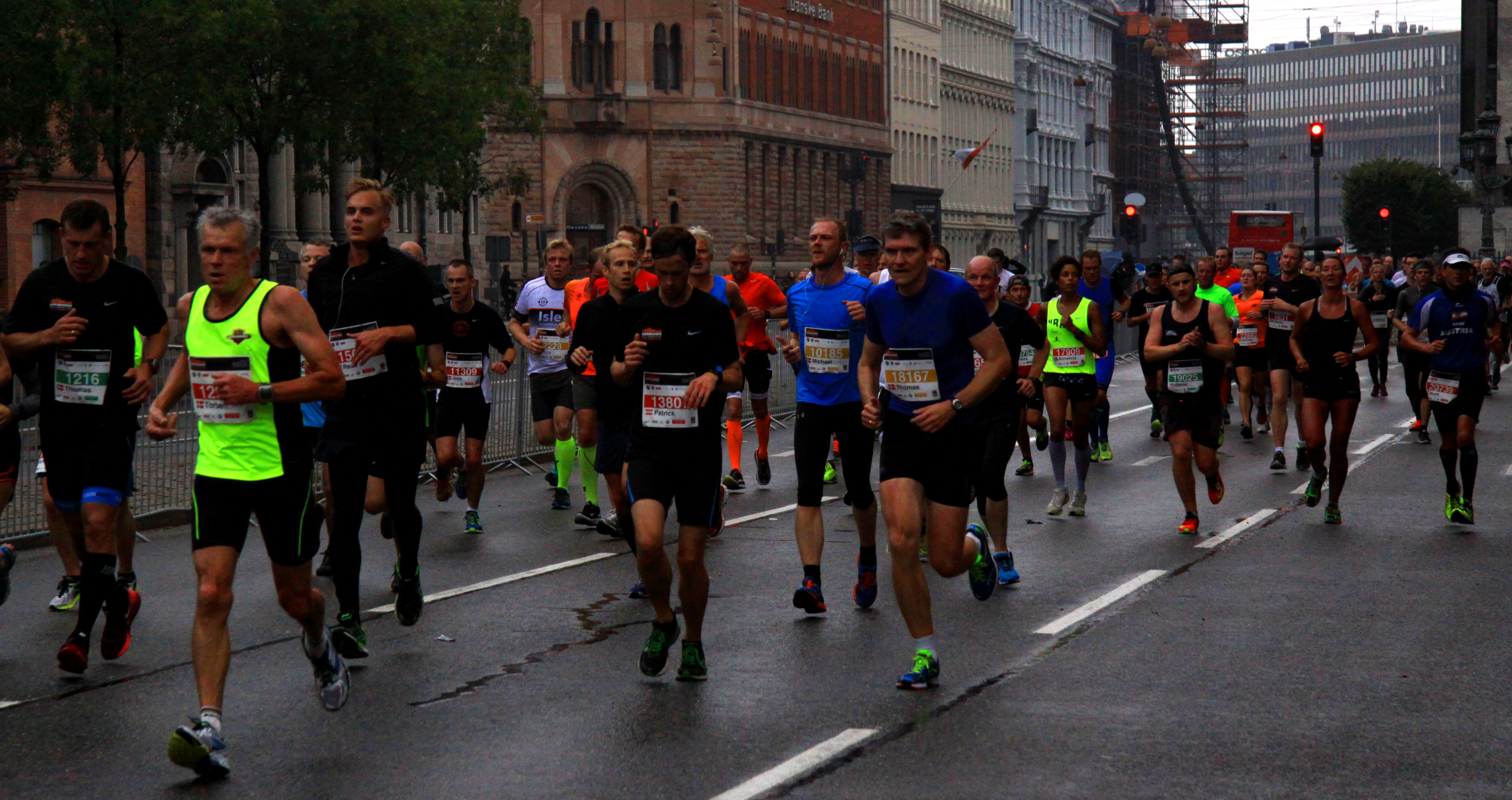
- Runners at the inaugural edition in 2015
- Date: September
- Location: Copenhagen, Denmark
- Event type: Road
- Distance: Half marathon
- Primary sponsor: Zalando
- Established: 2015
- Course records: Men's: 58:01 (2019) (Kenya) Geoffrey Kamworor; Women's: 1:05:11 (2024) (Kenya) Margaret Kipkemboi
- Website: Copenhagen Half Marathon
- Participants: 15,054 finishers (2021); 22,810 (2019)

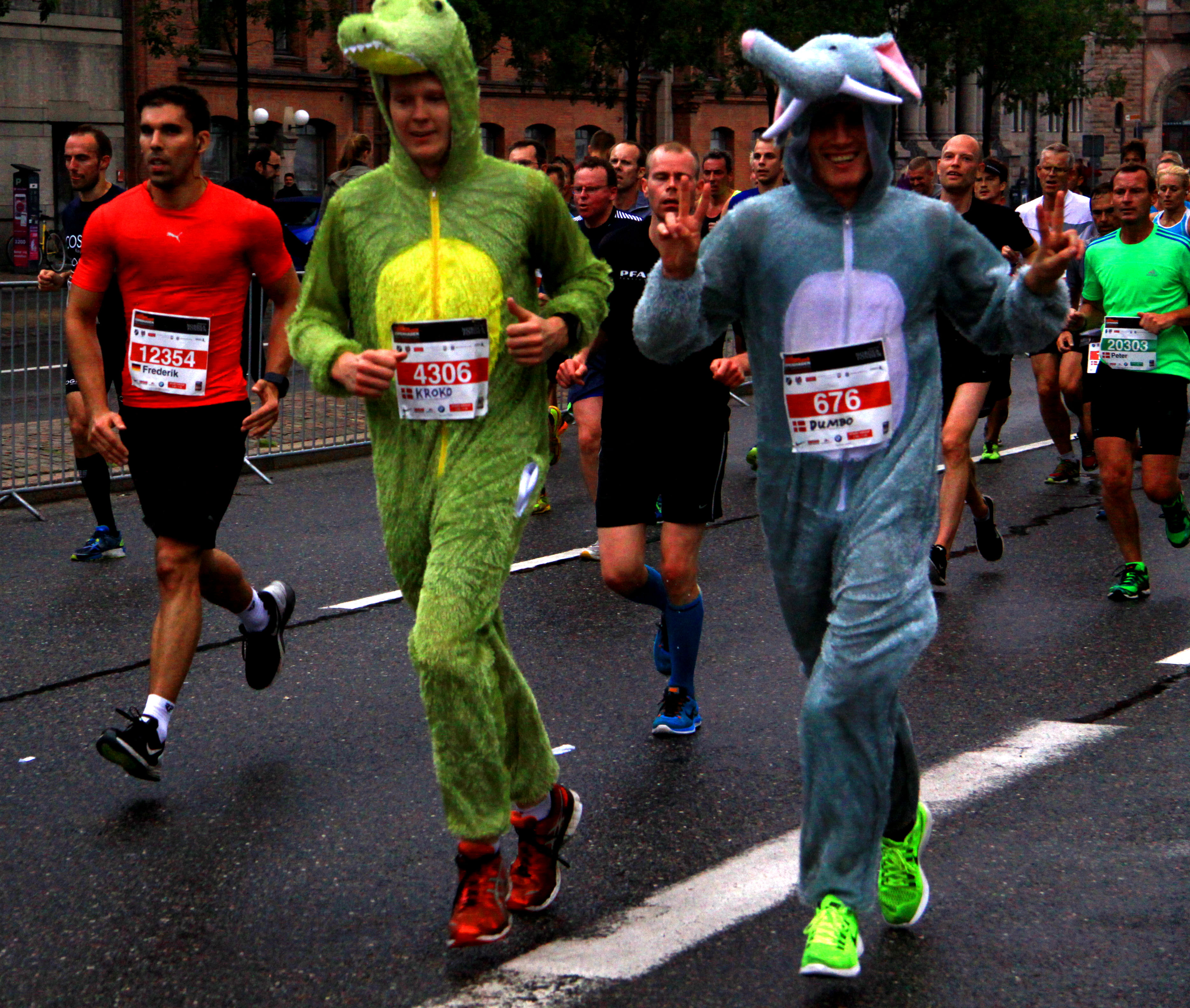
Running in costume in 2015

The Copenhagen Half Marathon is an annual half marathon road running event which takes place in September on the city streets of Copenhagen, Denmark, first held in 2015. It is a World Athletics Gold Label Road Race, making it the foremost race of its type in the country. The race features both public and professional elements.

The Copenhagen Half Marathon is the largest annual road running event in the city, followed by the more established Copenhagen Marathon, which has been held there since 1980. Geoffrey Kamworor set the half marathon world record during this race with a time of 58:01 in 2019.

== History ==
The event was launched after the success holding of the 2014 IAAF World Half Marathon Championships in the city. The course was slightly modified for the newly created annual event, with the race starting and finishing near Parken Stadium.

Nearly 20,000 runners took part in the inaugural edition in 2015. The first winners were both Kenyan, with Bedan Karoki Muchiri taking the men's race in 59:14 minutes and Purity Cherotich Rionoripo being the women's winner in 68:29 minutes.

Over 22,000 runners took part in the 2016 edition. The winners were James Mwangi Wangari from Kenya taking the men's race in 59:07 minutes and Purity Cherotich Rionoripo from Ethiopia being the women's winner in 68:00 minutes, both beating the existing course record.

It held the IAAF Silver Label Road Race status in 2016 and the IAAF Gold Label Road Race in 2017.

The 2020 edition of the race was cancelled due to the coronavirus pandemic, with all registrants given the option of transferring their entry to 2021 or obtaining a refund.

== Winners ==
Key: Course record

Ed.	Year	Male	Time	Female	Time	Rf.
1	2015	Bedan Muchiri (KEN)	59:14	Purity Rionoripo (KEN)	1:08:29	
2	2016	James Wangari (KEN)	59:07	Hiwot Gebrekidan (ETH)	1:08:00	
3	2017	Abraham Cheroben (BHR)	58:40	Eunice Chumba (BHR)	1:06:11	
4	2018	Daniel Kipchumba (KEN)	59:06	Sifan Hassan (NED)	1:05:15 ER	
5	2019	Geoffrey Kamworor (KEN)	58:01 WR	Birhane Dibaba (ETH)	1:05:57	
	2020	cancelled due to coronavirus pandemic				
6	2021	Amedework Walelegn (ETH)	59:10	Hawi Feysa (ETH)	1:05:41	
7	2022	Milkesa Mengesha (ETH)	58:58	Tadu Teshome (ETH)	1:06:13	
8	2023	Edward Cheserek (KEN)	59:11	Irine Cheptai (KEN)	1:05:53	
9	2024	Sabastian Sawe (KEN)	58:05	Margaret Kipkemboi (KEN)	1:05:11	
