= New York City Half Marathon =

Annual race in the United States held since 2006

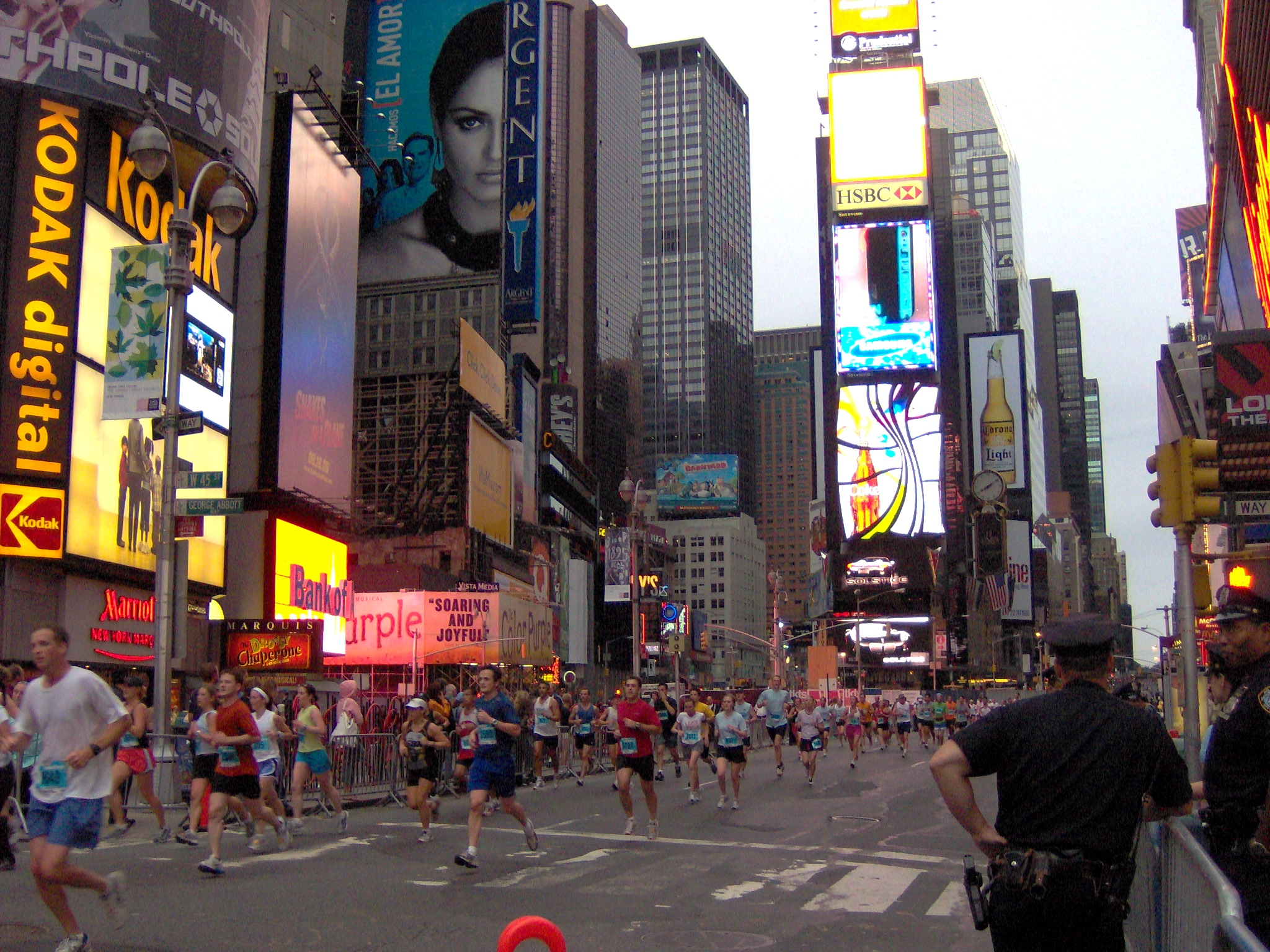
- Times Square during inaugural race in 2006
- Date: Usually the 3rd Sunday in March
- Location: New York City
- Event type: Road
- Distance: Half marathon 13.109 miles (21.097 km)
- Primary sponsor: United Airlines
- Established: 2006 (20 years ago)
- Course records: 59:09 (men); 1:06:33 (women); 1:10:41 (non-binary)
- Website: New York City Half Marathon
- Participants: 24,745 finishers (2023); 24,663 finishers (2019)

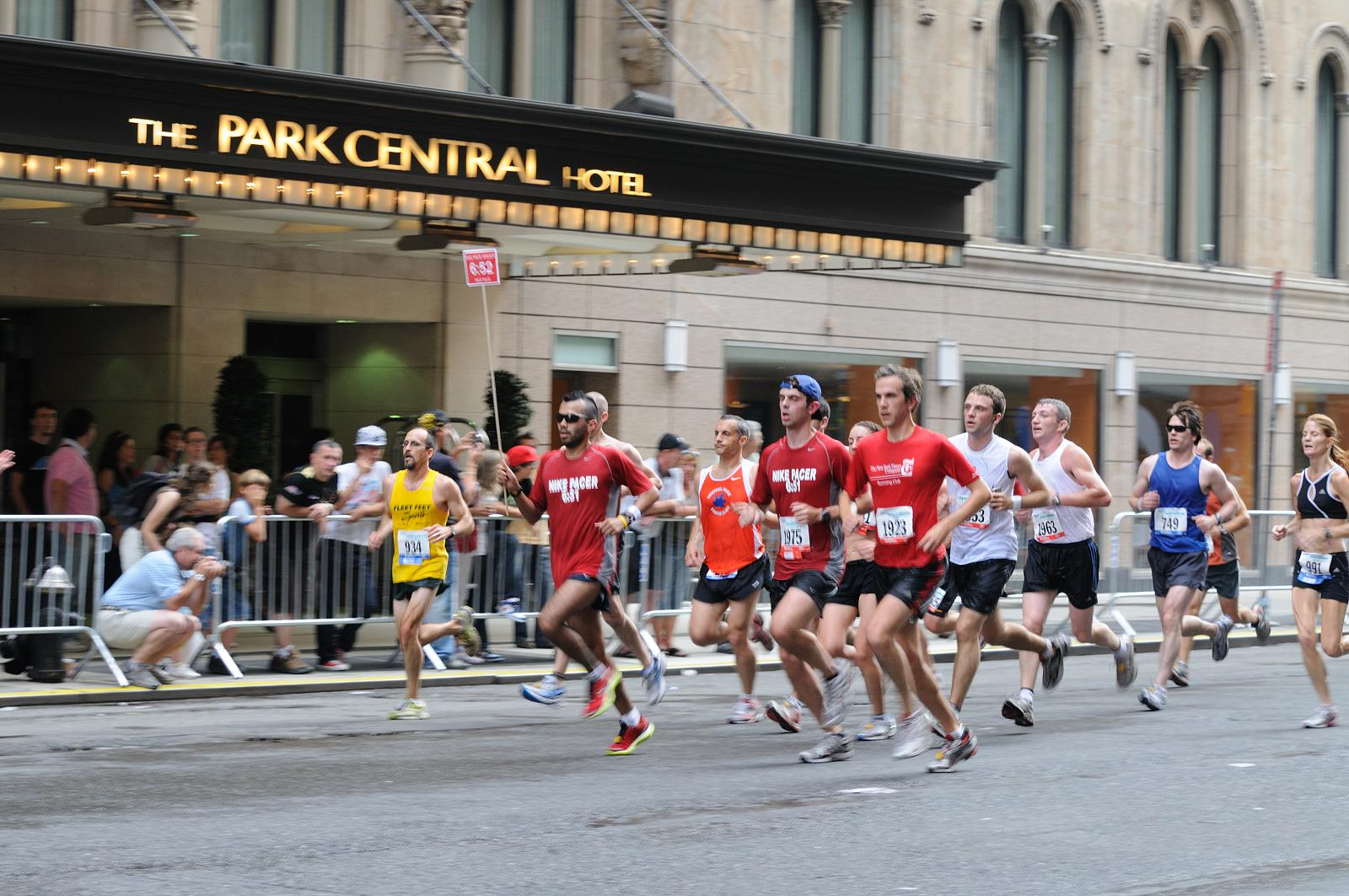
1:30 pace group on 7th Avenue passing Park Central Hotel, 2008

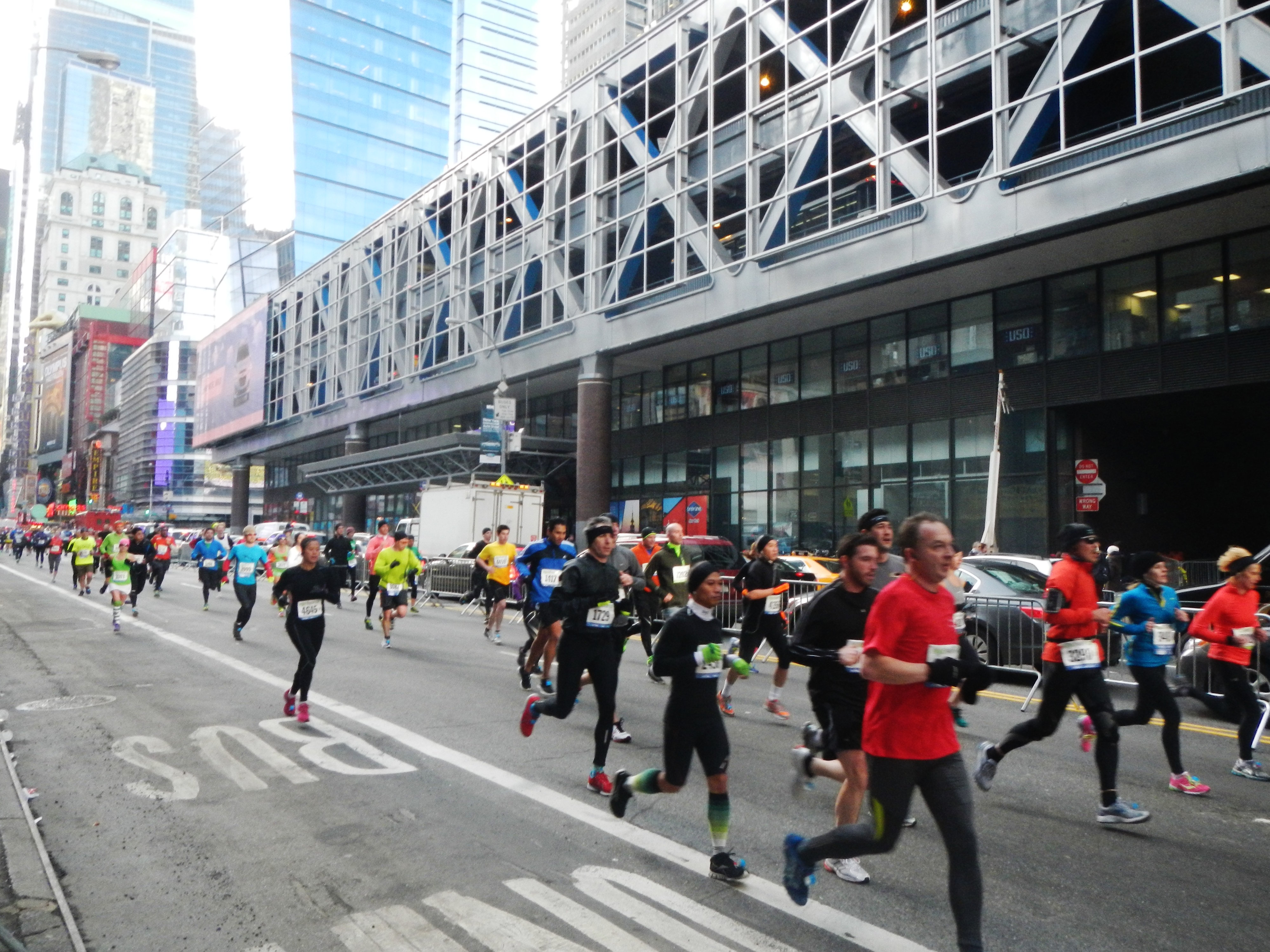
Port Authority Bus Terminal in 2013

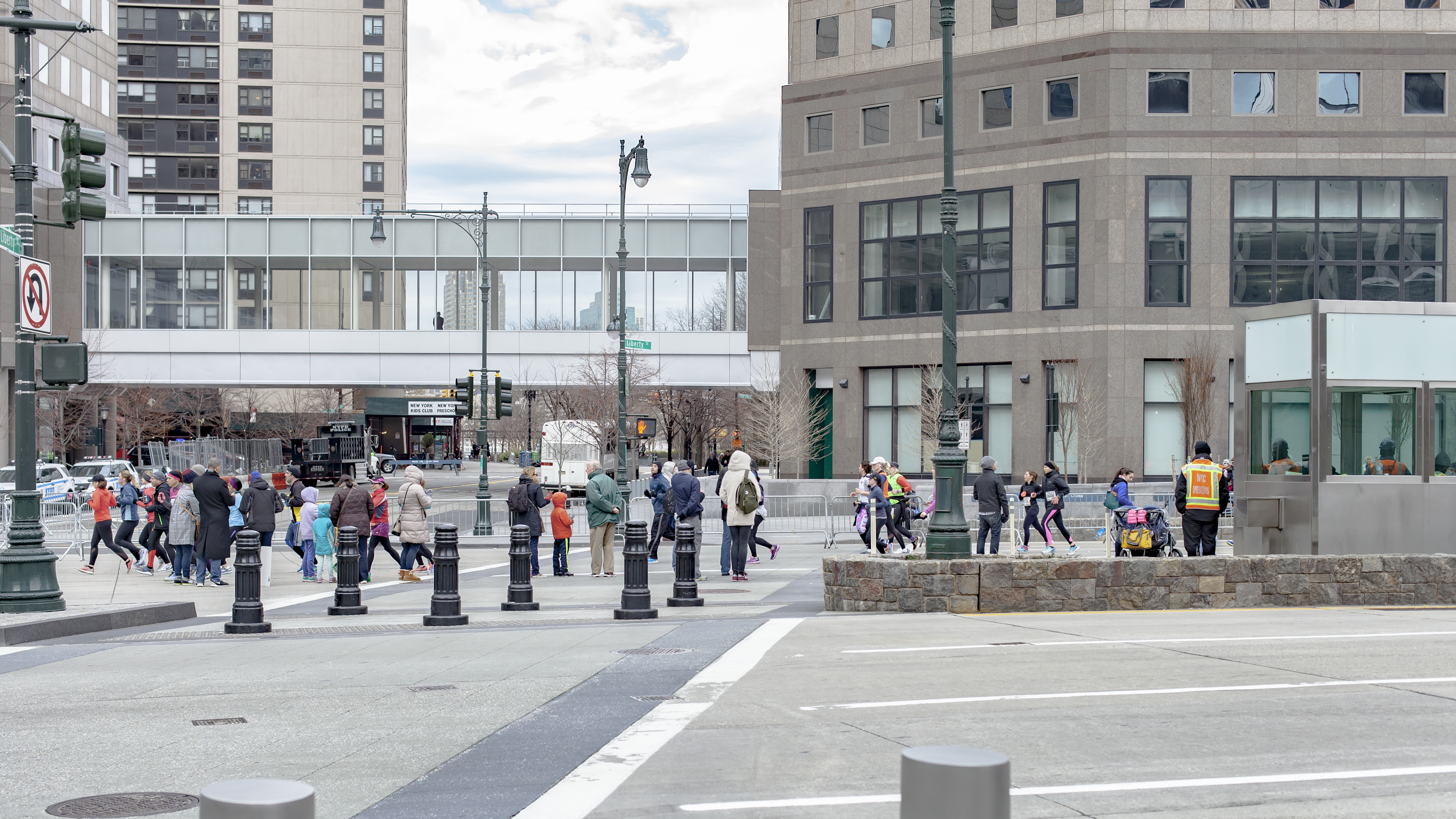
World Financial Center in 2016

The New York City Half Marathon (branded as the United Airlines NYC Half) is an annual half marathon road running race held since 2006 in New York City, United States. (Note: The event was cancelled in 2020 and 2021 due to the coronavirus pandemic.) It connects Brooklyn's Prospect Park with Manhattan's Central Park via the Manhattan Bridge, passing through or by Times Square, Grand Central, and both Grand Army Plazas. New York Road Runners (NYRR) administers the race.

== History ==
Numerous world class runners have participated in the race, including marathon record holders Haile Gebrselassie and Paula Radcliffe, Olympic marathon medalists Catherine Ndereba, Meb Keflezighi, and Deena Kastor, 2008 U.S. Olympic marathoner Dathan Ritzenhein, and American half marathon record holder Ryan Hall.

Gebrselassie set the men's course record in 2007, with a time of 59:24. On March 20, 2016, Molly Huddle set the women's record with a time of 1:07:41.

In its earlier years, the event was run on various dates in the summer; in 2010, it was moved to March. The 2010 race had a field of 14,821 registered runners and 11,604 finishers. Mary Wittenberg, president of the NYRR, said in 2010 that she expected a possible growth of over 20,000 participants in future years.

On October 8, 2014, United Airlines, which was the sponsor of many of the NYRR races, became the title sponsor of the NYC Half Marathon.

The 2020 and 2021 races were cancelled due to the COVID-19 pandemic. All registrants were given the option of obtaining a full refund or guaranteed, non-complimentary entry to the March 2022 race. (Note: Registrants who obtained their 2021 entry via deferring their 2020 entry had the option of deferring their entry again to 2022, and registrants who earned their entry via an NYRR program would have their entries automatically deferred to 2022.)

== Course ==
External images
- Course map of half marathon in 2012
- Course map of half marathon in 2019

=== 2006–2008 ===
From 2006 through 2008, the course started in Central Park near East 85th Street and looped clockwise for approximately 7.6 miles (more than one full loop) until runners exited Central Park onto Seventh Avenue and through Times Square. Runners made a right turn onto West 42nd Street, followed by a left turn onto the West Side Highway, adjacent to the Hudson River. The race ended on the West Side Highway by Rector Street, near the southern tip of Manhattan.

=== 2009–2017 ===
From 2009 through 2017, the course started near East 72nd Street with a counter-clockwise 6.2-mile (10 km) loop around hilly Central Park. The course then flattened and went along Seventh Avenue to Times Square, where it followed 42nd Street to the West Side Highway, adjacent to the Hudson River. The race passed through Battery Park and finished at Wall Street near the southern tip of Manhattan.

=== 2018 ===
In October 2017, NYRR announced a course change for the 2018 race. The course begins in Prospect Park and heads northwest along Flatbush Avenue, and then crosses the Manhattan Bridge. Runners then proceed through the Lower East Side towards FDR Drive, and exit onto 42nd Street. At Times Square, the course heads north on Seventh Avenue into Central Park. Runners follow the main loop in Central Park clockwise, cut across the park on the 72nd Street Transverse, and then finish near Tavern on the Green around 67th Street on the west side of the park.

=== Since 2025 ===
For the first time in the history of NYRR races, the 2025 NYC half course included the Brooklyn Bridge in place of the Manhattan Bridge. This change came into effect following constructions around the Manhattan end of the Manhattan Bridge.

== Winners ==
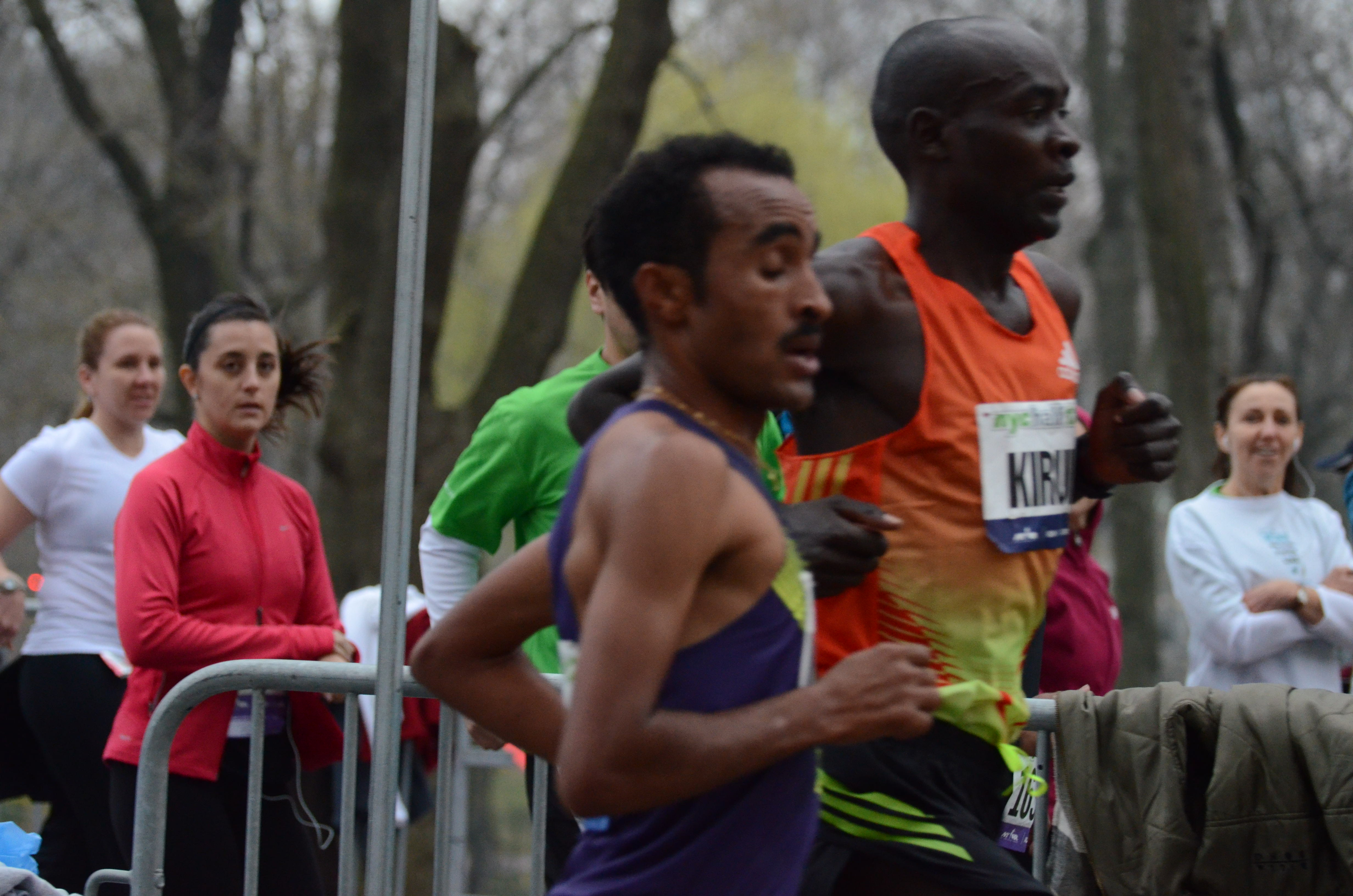
2012 winner Kenyan Peter Kirui passing Ethiopian Deriba Merga in Central Park about 4 miles (6 km) in

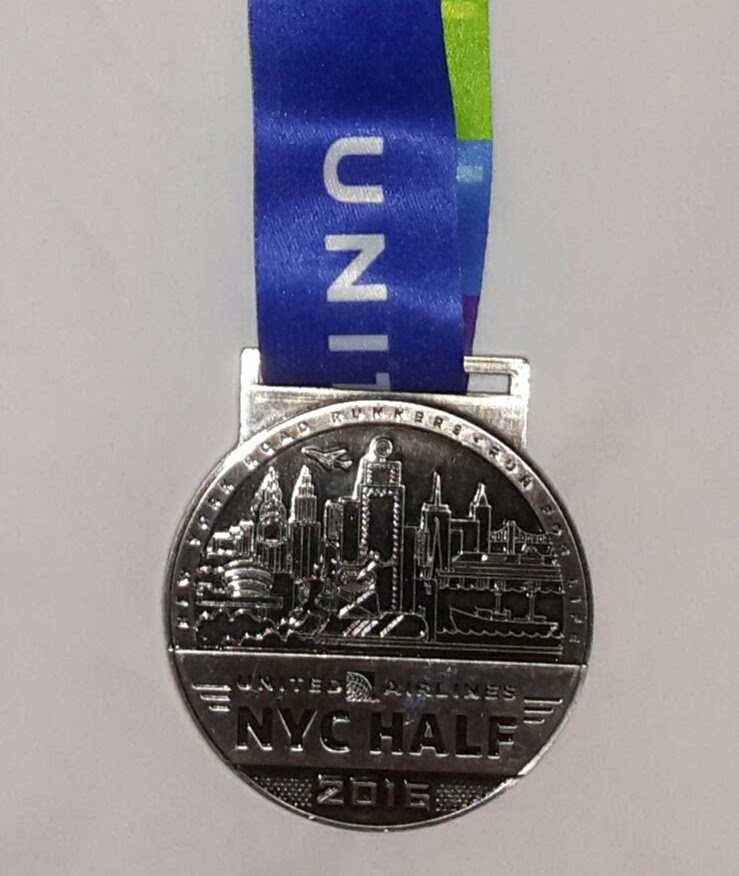
Finisher medal from 2016

Key: Event record (in bold)

Ed.	Date	Male winner	Time	Female winner	Time	Non-binary winner	Time	Rf.
1	2006.08.27	Tom Nyariki (KEN)	1:01:22	Catherine Ndereba (KEN)	1:09:43	not contested		
2	2007.08.05	Haile Gebrselassie (ETH)	59:24	Hilda Kibet (KEN)	1:10:32	not contested		
3	2008.07.27	Tadese Tola (ETH)	1:00:58	Catherine Ndereba (KEN)	1:10:19	not contested		
4	2009.08.16	Tadese Tola (ETH)	1:01:06	Paula Radcliffe (GBR)	1:09:45	not contested		
5	2010.03.21	Peter Kamais (KEN)	59:52	Mara Yamauchi (GBR)	1:09:17	not contested		
6	2011.03.20	Mo Farah (GBR)	1:00:23	Caroline Rotich (KEN)	1:08:52	not contested		
7	2012.03.18	Peter Kirui (KEN)	59:39	Firehiwot Dado (ETH)	1:08:35	not contested		
8	2013.03.17	Wilson Kipsang (KEN)	1:01:02	Caroline Rotich (KEN)	1:09:09	not contested		
9	2014.03.16	Geoffrey Mutai (KEN)	1:00:50	Sally Kipyego (KEN)	1:08:31	not contested		
10	2015.03.15	Leonard Korir (KEN)	1:01:06	Molly Huddle (USA)	1:08:31	not contested		
11	2016.03.20	Stephen Sambu (KEN)	1:01:16	Molly Huddle (USA)	1:07:41	not contested		
12	2017.03.19	Feyisa Lilesa (ETH)	1:00:04	Molly Huddle (USA)	1:08:19	not contested		
13	2018.03.18	Ben True (USA)	1:02:39	Buze Diriba (ETH)	1:12:23	not contested		
14	2019.03.17	Belay Tilahun (ETH)	1:02:10	Joyciline Jepkosgei (KEN)	1:10:07	not contested		
—	—	cancelled in 2020 and 2021 due to coronavirus pandemic						
15	2022.03.20	Edward Cheserek (KEN)	1:00:37	Senbere Teferi (ETH)	1:07:35	Jacob Caswell (USA)	1:12:20	
16	2023.03.19	Jacob Kiplimo (UGA)	1:01:31	Hellen Obiri (KEN)	1:07:21	Ian Stowe (USA)	1:15:26	
17	2024.03.17	Abel Kipchumba (KEN)	1:00:25	Karoline Grøvdal (NOR)	1:09:09	Galo Vasquez (USA)	**1:10:41**	
18	2025.03.16	Abel Kipchumba (KEN)	**59:09**	Sharon Lokedi (KEN)	1:07:04	Galo Vasquez (USA)	1:11:22	
19	2026.03.15	Adriaan Wildschutt (RSA)	59:30	Hellen Obiri (KEN)	**1:06:33**	Daniel Mata (USA)	1:16:16	

== See also ==
- New York City Marathon
