= 2012 World Junior Championships in Athletics – Men's 10,000 metres =

The men's 10000 metres at the 2012 World Junior Championships in Athletics was held at the Estadi Olímpic Lluís Companys on 10 July.

== Medalists ==
Gold	Silver	Bronze
Yigrem Demelash; Ethiopia	Philemon Kipchilis Cheboi; Kenya	Geoffrey Kipkorir Kirui; Kenya

== Records ==
Prior to the competition, the existing world junior and championship records were as follows.

World Junior Record	Samuel Wanjiru (KEN)	26:41.75	Brussels, Belgium	26 August 2005
Championship Record	Josphat Kipkoech Bett (KEN)	27:30.85	Bydgoszcz, Poland	9 July 2008
World Junior Leading	Geoffrey Kipkorir Kirui (KEN)	27:08.44	Eugene, OR, United States	1 June 2012

== Results ==
Rank	Name	Nationality	Time	Note
1st place, gold medalist(s)	Yigrem Demelash	Ethiopia	28:16.07	PB
2nd place, silver medalist(s)	Philemon Kipchilis Cheboi	Kenya	28:23.98	PB
3rd place, bronze medalist(s)	Geoffrey Kipkorir Kirui	Kenya	28:30.47	
4	Kinde Atanaw	Ethiopia	28:53.02	
5	Moses Martin Kurong	Uganda	29:06.87	
6	Kenta Murayama	Japan	29:40.56	
7	Ken Yokote	Japan	29:41.81	SB
8	Rahul Kumar Pal	India	29:42.15	PB
9	Zakaria Boudad	Morocco	30:21.07	
10	Daniele D'Onofrio	Italy	31:07.70	
11	Jacob Kildoo	United States	31:09.94	
12	Matías Silva	Chile	31:10.40	
13	Angel Ronco	Spain	31:18.35	
14	Claudiu Costin Cimpoeru	Romania	31:20.74	PB
15	Ryan Pickering	United States	31:33.69	
16	Edwin Haroldo Pirir	Guatemala	31:37.53	
17	Samuel Barata	Portugal	31:42.17	
18	Jonas Koller	Germany	31:42.81	
19	Myeongjun Son	South Korea	31:45.17	
20	Youcef Addouche	Algeria	31:45.29	
21	Áron Tóth	Hungary	31:50.25	
22	Yerson Orellana	Peru	31:51.98	
23	Binlu Wang	China	31:53.86	
24	Kevin Dooney	Ireland	31:56.41	
25	Ibrahim Ahmed	Canada	32:06.73	
26	Lucas Jaramillo	Chile	32:09.18	
27	Oleksiy Obukhovskyy	Ukraine	32:27.04	
28	Demeke Teshale	Israel	33:01.37	
29	Alexandre Lavigne	Canada	33:07.04	
30	Yuriy Datsko	Ukraine	33:14.32	
31	Zendio Daza	Peru	33:21.21	
32	Akoye Derseh	Israel	35:16.30	
	Mouloud Madoui	Algeria	DNF	
	Artur Bossy	Spain	DNF	
	Abdelmunaim Yahya Adam	Sudan	DNS	

== Participation ==
According to an unofficial count, 34 athletes from 23 countries participated in the event.

- Algeria (2)
- Canada (2)
- Chile (2)
- China (1)
- Ethiopia (2)
- Germany (1)
- Guatemala (1)
- Hungary (1)
- India (1)
- Ireland (1)
- Israel (2)
- Italy (1)
- Japan (2)
- Kenya (2)
- Morocco (1)
- Peru (2)
- Portugal (1)
- Romania (1)
- South Korea (1)
- Spain (2)
- Uganda (1)
- Ukraine (2)
- United States (2)
