= 2019 Boston Marathon =

Footrace in Boston, Massachusetts, USA

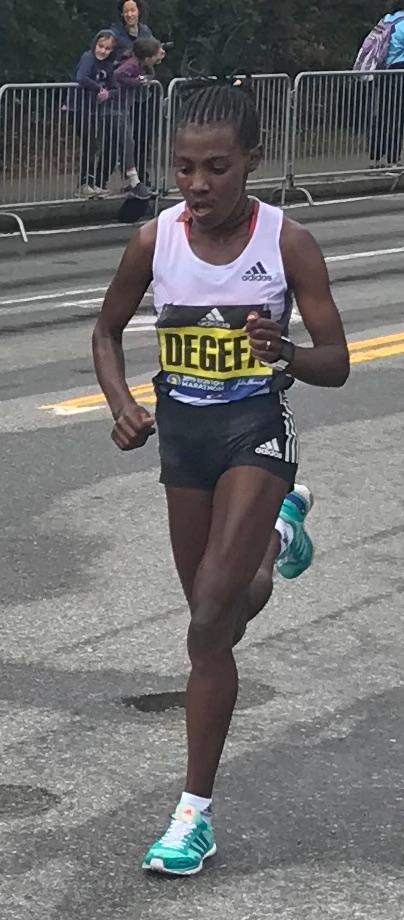
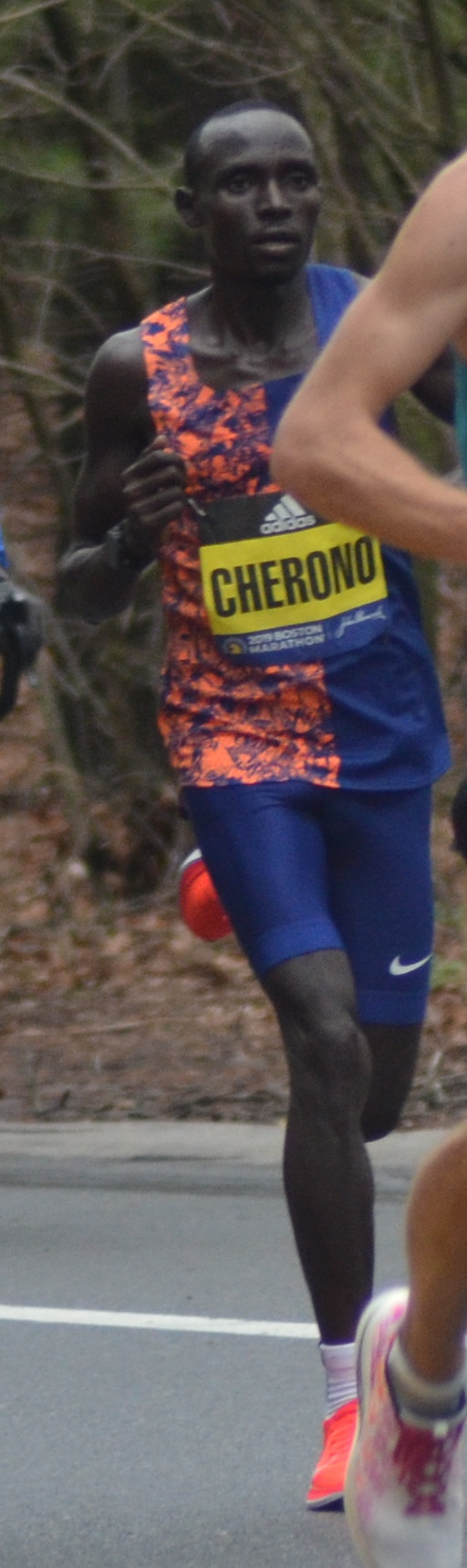
- Worknesh Degefa and Lawrence Cherono
- Venue: Boston, Massachusetts, United States
- Date: April 15, 2019

Champions
- Men: Lawrence Cherono (2:07:57)
- Women: Worknesh Degefa (2:23:31)
- Wheelchair men: Daniel Romanchuk (1:21:36)
- Wheelchair women: Manuela Schär (1:34:19)

The 2019 Boston Marathon was the 123rd running of the annual marathon race held in Boston, Massachusetts. It took place on April 15, 2019. The elite men's race came down to a sprint finish, which Lawrence Cherono won in 2:07:57. The elite women's race was won by Worknesh Degefa, who took an early lead and built up a large gap between herself and the other runners, in 2:23:31. The men's and women's wheelchair races were won by Daniel Romanchuk in 1:21:36 and Manuela Schär in 1:34:19, respectively.

== Course ==
The marathon distance is officially 42.195 kilometres (26.219 mi), as sanctioned by the International Association of Athletics Federations (IAAF), now known as World Athletics. The start is in the town of Hopkinton and the first 6 miles (9.7 km) are downhill through Ashland and into the city of Framingham. Leaving Framingham, the runners enter the town of Natick, before passing through the "Scream Tunnel" at mile 12. This area is lined by young women from the nearby Wellesley College who request kisses from runners, a tradition that has been in place for more than 100 years. At mile 15, there is a large downhill section, followed by a 0.75-mile (1.21 km) climb at mile 16 crossing the Yankee Division Highway. The runners take a right turn onto Commonwealth Avenue in Newton before starting the first of the four Newton Hills.

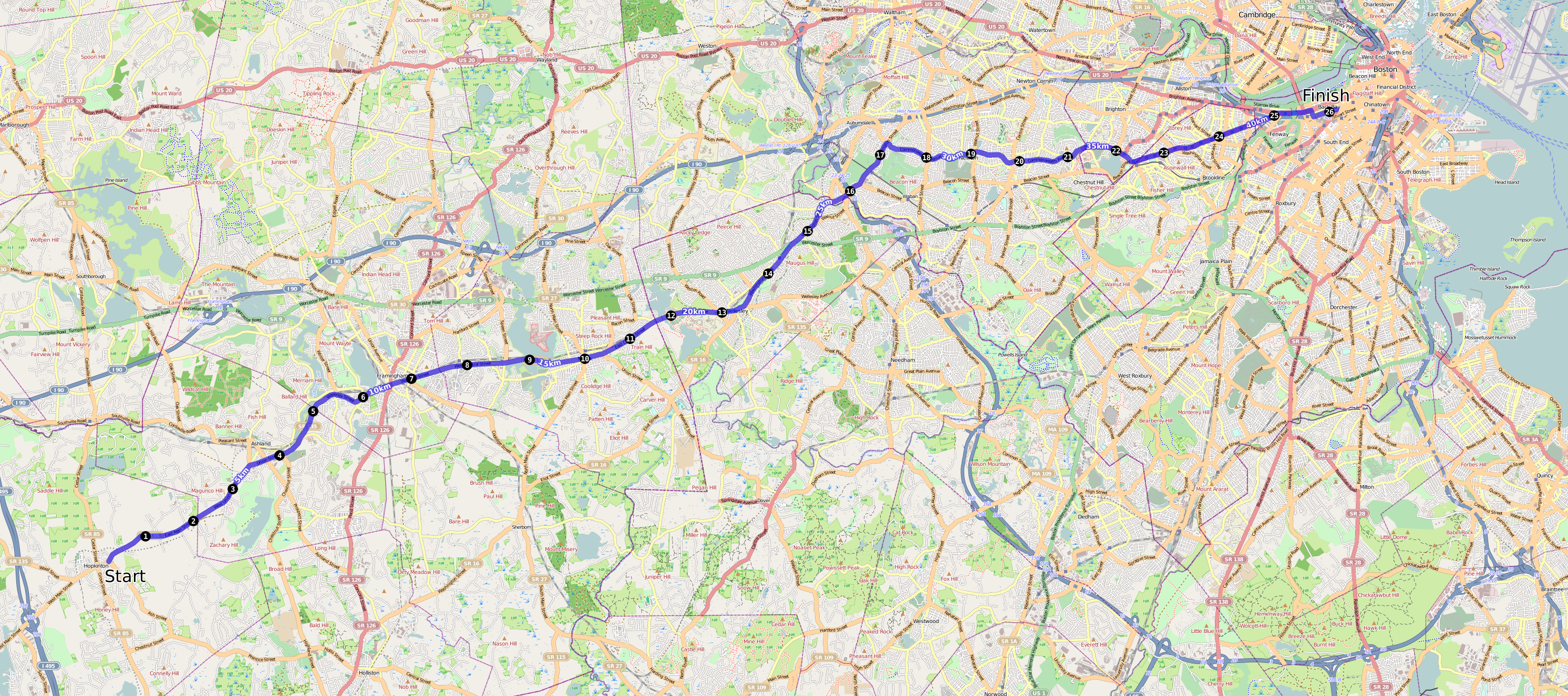
Course map

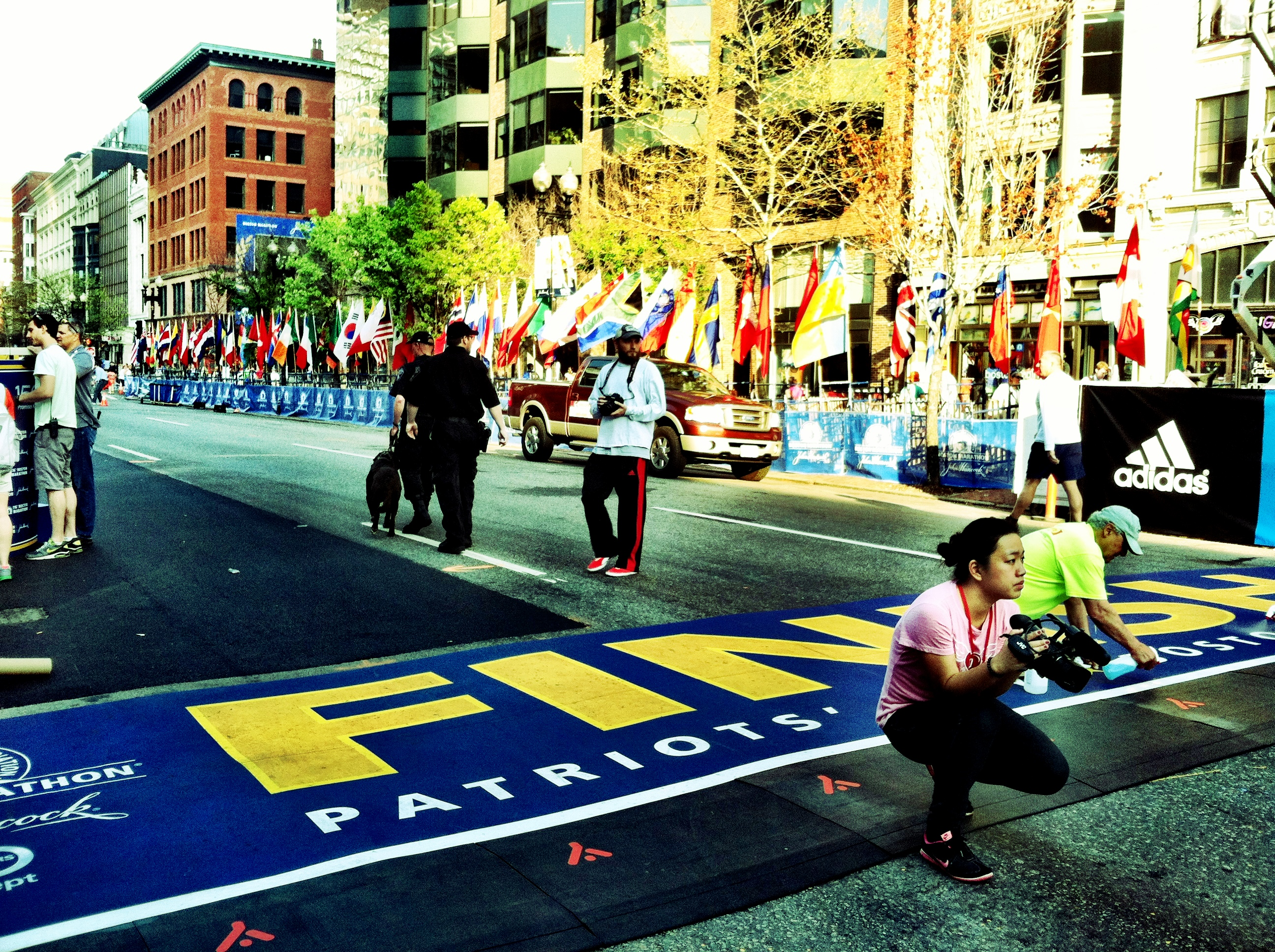
Finish line on Boylston Street in 2012

The first hill is a steep 1,200-yard (1,100 m) climb, the second about 0.25 miles (0.40 km), the third a steep 800 yards (730 m) before the runners start the infamous "Heartbreak Hill" at just after mile 20. At half a mile long and with a 3.3% percent incline, it is not especially difficult, but due to the hill being 20 miles (32 km) into the race, it is still feared as the runners' legs are usually tired at this point. The course is mostly downhill to the end, and passes through Boston College before entering Cleveland Circle and Kenmore Square, where there are many spectators. The final mile has a slight incline, before it flattens off to finish on Boylston Street.

== Field ==
The 2019 edition of the marathon included nine previous winners of the race. The elite women's race included the 2018 winner Des Linden, who had the ninth-fastest personal best in the field. Sally Kipyego, runner-up in the 2016 New York City Marathon and the 10,000 metres at the 2012 Summer Olympics also competed. The fastest woman in the field was Aselefech Mergia, who ran 2:19:31 to win the 2012 Dubai Marathon. Mergia raced alongside three other sub-2:20 runners; Edna Kiplagat, Mare Dibaba, and Worknesh Degefa. Jordan Hasay, who had been dealing with injury and had pulled out of the previous year's race the day before, returned to race. Also running were 2015 winner Caroline Rotich and 2012 winner Sharon Cherop. The field included 11 sub-2:23 runners.

The elite men's race featured 2018 winner Yuki Kawauchi. The Boston Herald listed "five men to watch": Geoffrey Kirui, winner in 2017 and whose personal best was 2:06:27, Soloman Deksisa (personal best of 2:04:40), Lawrence Cherono (personal best of 2:04:06), Lelisa Desisa, winner in 2015 and whose personal best was 2:04:45, and Hiroto Inoue (personal best of 2:06:54) who was debuting in Boston. Others who had run sub-2:05 were Sisay Lemma (best of 2:04:08) and Lemi Berhanu (best of 2:04:33). The men's wheelchair race featured four-time winner Marcel Hug and ten-time winner Ernst van Dyk, whilst the women's featured Manuela Schär, the first woman to record a sub-1:30 in Boston. Also racing were Sandra Graf, and Americans Amanda McGrory, Susannah Scaroni, and Tatyana McFadden.

The day before the race, the winners of the previous year's race spoke to a crowd in Copley Square about subjects such as their diet and the mental challenges in marathons.

== Race summary ==
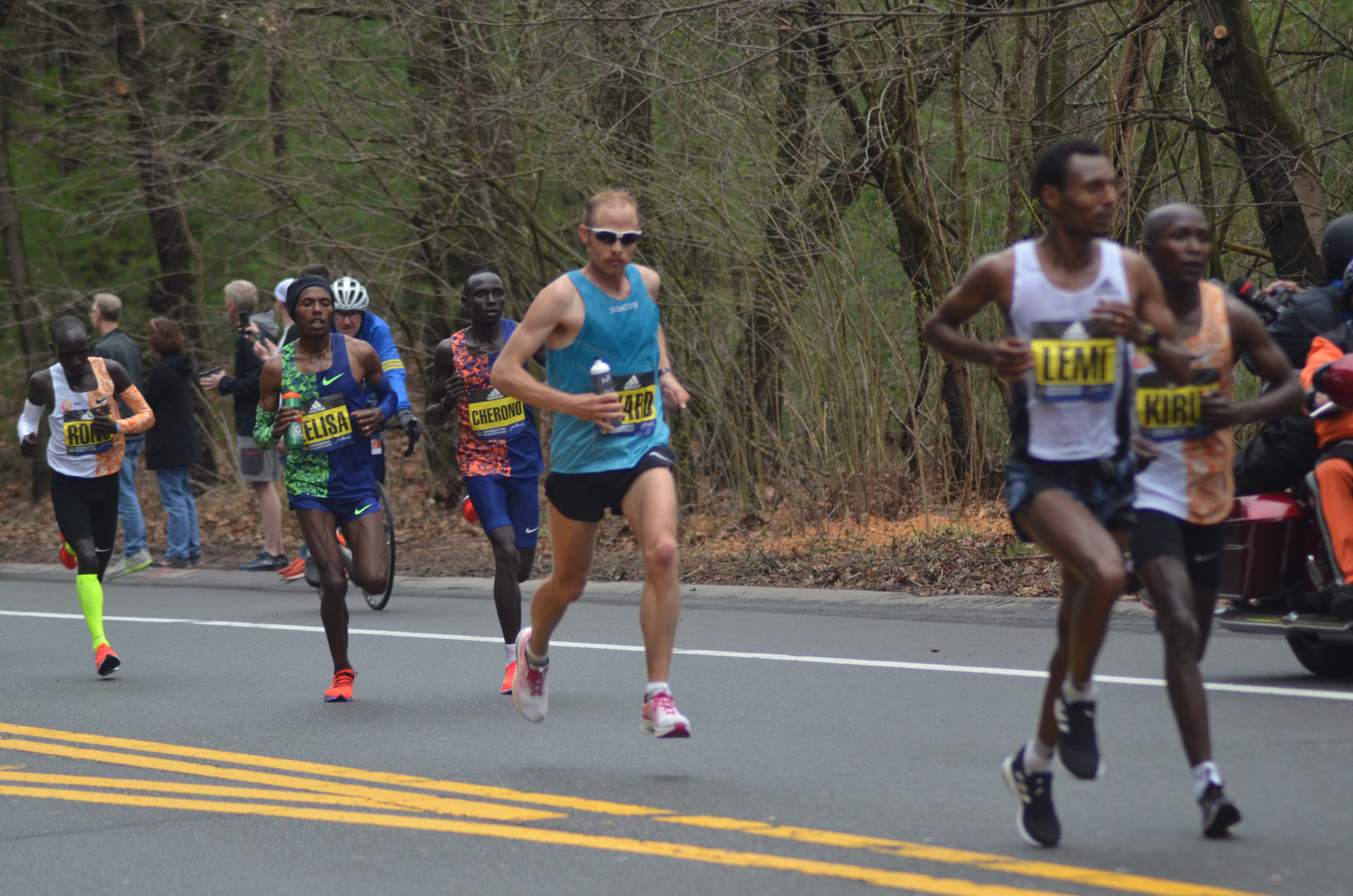
Lead pack of men approaching the half-way point

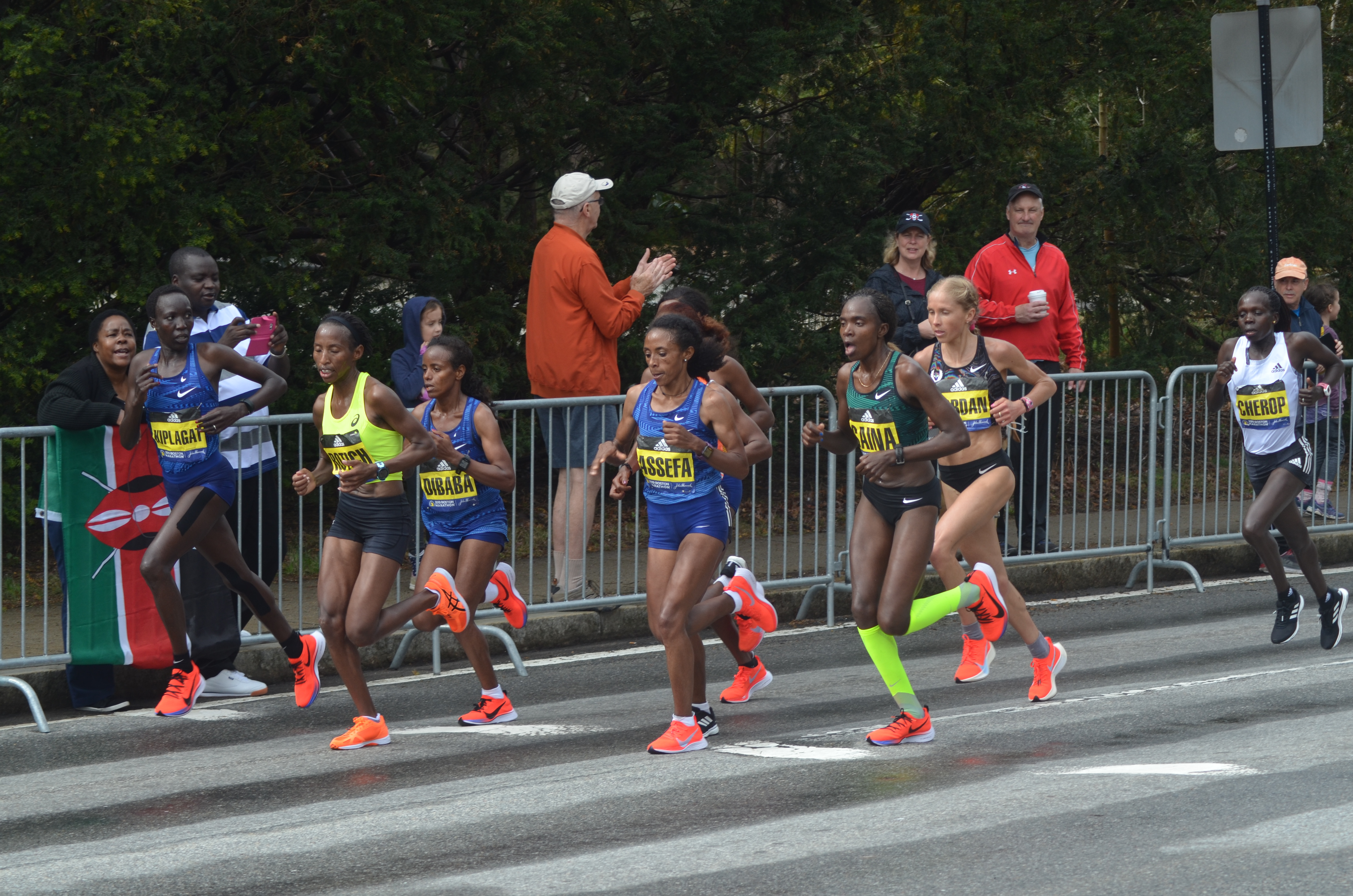
Lead pack of women (except Worknesh who was over a minute ahead) approaching the half-way point

In the early morning, rain had made the conditions wet but by the start there was only some light rain which cleared away later in the day. The race began with a flyover of General Dynamics F-16 Fighting Falcons from the 104th Fighter Squadron. In the men's race, Inoue and Kawauchi went to the front of the lead pack early on and, following a series of sub-5 minute miles, the group of 25 passed 10 kilometres (6.2 mi) in 30:20. The lead pack didn't "get really serious about hard racing" until they had passed through Wellesley. By Heartbreak Hill the pack still contained eight runners but, at 21 miles (34 km), Kiriu increased the pace, decreasing the size of the group to just five runners. The group had further reduced to three by mile 24; Cherono, Desisa, and Kenneth Kipkemoi. With 1 mile (1.6 km) to go, Kipkemoi increased the pace. Then with 1 kilometre (0.62 mi) left, Desisa made a surge before Cherono was able to catch up and the two sprinted down Boyleston Street. Desisa was unable to hold Cherono's pace and he dropped behind, meaning Cherono won in 2:07:57, two seconds ahead of Desisa. Kipkemoi finished third in 2:08:07, later stating that he had wanted to get away from the other runners, but they had managed to stay with him. The gap between the top two runners was the closest since the 1988 edition.

In the women's race, Sara Hall took control early on, passing 5 kilometres (3.1 mi) in a "slow" time of 17:34, but Degefa overtook her about not long after. She had built up a small gap on the pack by 4 miles (6.4 km) with Cherop and Dibaba attempting to stay close. However, by 10 kilometres (6.2 mi), Degefa was 14 seconds ahead of the two and 29 seconds ahead of the chasing group. Degefa passed through halfway in 1:10:40 and had managed to extend her lead to nearly three minutes by 30 kilometres (19 mi). The chasing group comprised 12 runners through the halfway point, but the group began to break up in the following hills. With 10 miles (16 km) left, Kiplagat made a move from the chasing group and in the 22nd mile, moved into second place and began to catch Degefa. However, despite running the fastest 5 kilometres (3.1 mi) split in the race (16:08 between the 35th and 40th kilometres), Kiplagat was too far from Degefa and she won in 2:23:31. Kiplagat finished second, 42 seconds back in 2:24:13 and Hasay in third, a further 67 seconds back in 2:25:20.

In the men's wheelchair race, Daniel Romanchuk passed Masazumi Soejima at mile 16 and won in 1:21:36, an American record. At 20 years old, he was the youngest winner in the history of the race and the first American since Jim Knaub won in 1993. Soejima finished second in 1:24:30 and Hug took third in 1:24:42. Romanchuk called the victory an "amazing thing to happen". In the women's race, Schär took the lead. McFadden was in sight of the leaders when she slipped on a railroad track around mile six, causing her wheelchair to flip. Schär "cruised to victory" in 1:34:19 while McFadden was able to recover lost ground, finishing in 1:41:35 to take second place, one second ahead of Madison de Rozario. The Boston Herald described Schär as "dominant" and "increasing her lead at every checkpoint".

== Results ==
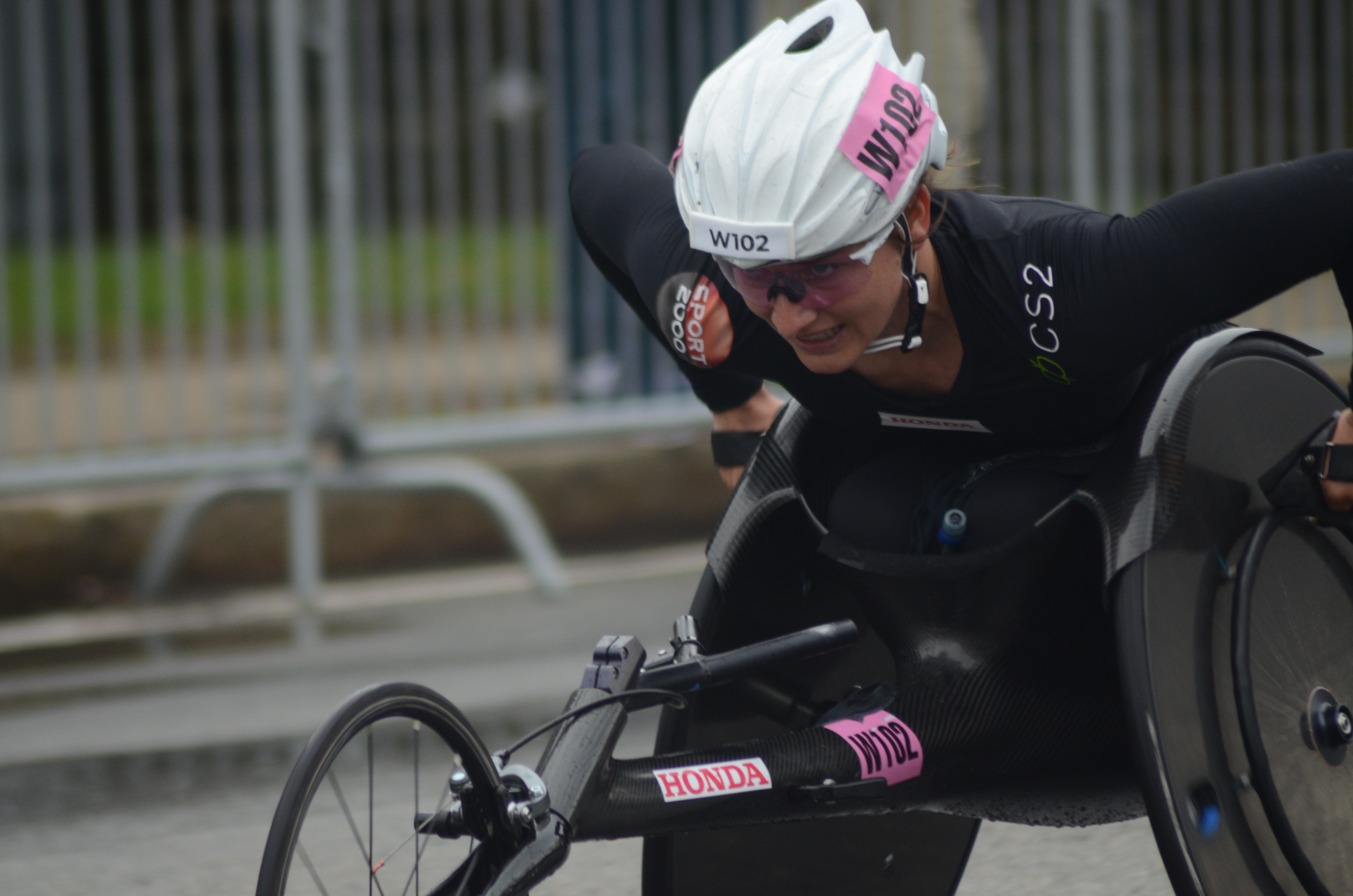
Manuela Schär

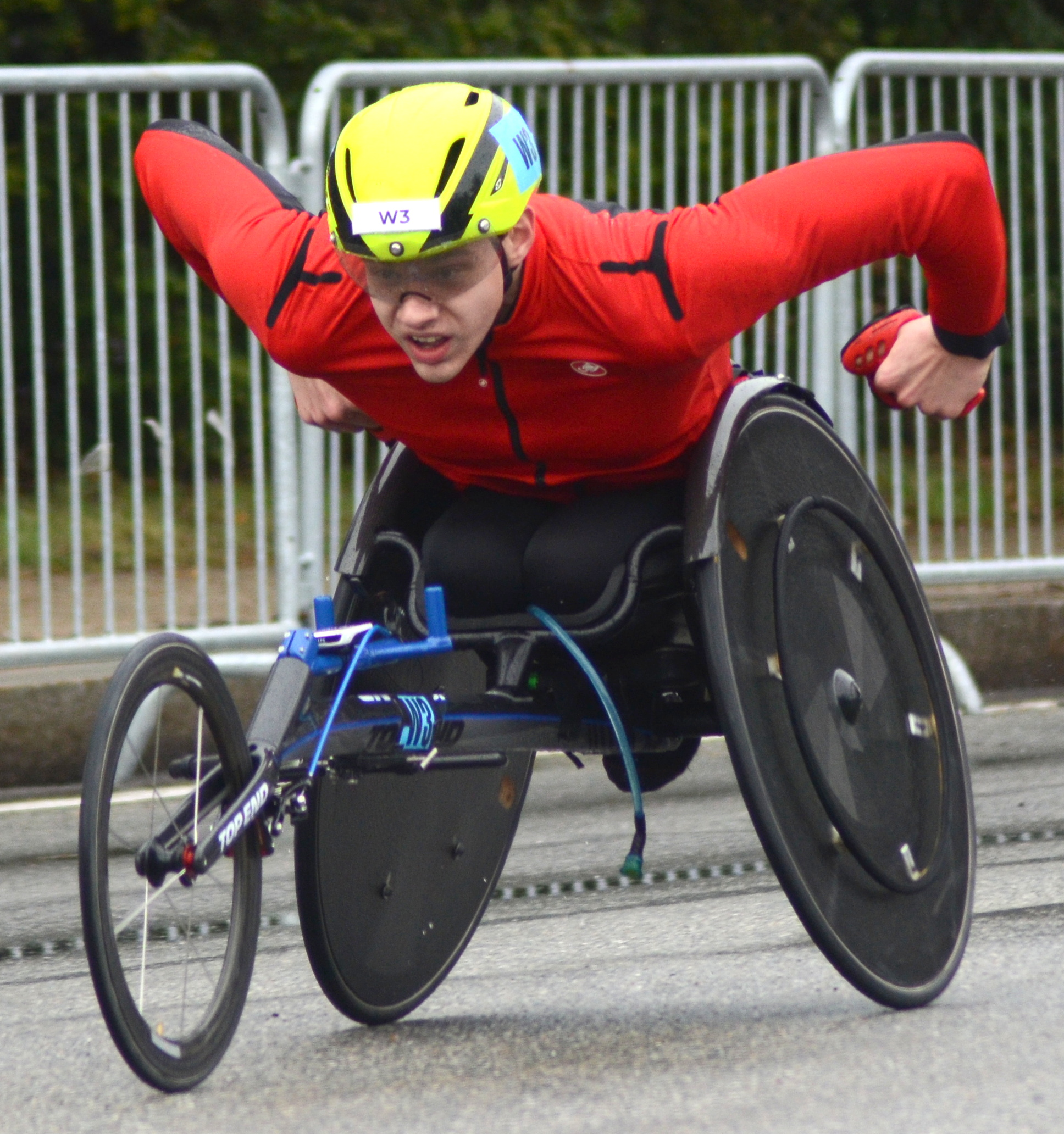
Daniel Romanchuk

Results reported by NBC Sports and the Boston Athletic Association.

Men's results
Place	Athlete	Nationality	Time
1	Lawrence Cherono	Kenya	2:07:57
2	Lelisa Desisa	Ethiopia	2:07:59
3	Kenneth Kipkemoi	Kenya	2:08:07
4th	Felix Kandie	Kenya	2:08:54
5th	Geoffrey Kirui	Kenya	2:08:55
6th	Philemon Rono	Kenya	2:08:57
7th	Scott Fauble	United States	2:09:09
8th	Jared Ward	United States	2:09:25
9th	Festus Talam	Kenya	2:09:25
10th	Benson Kipruto	Kenya	2:09:53

Women's results
Place	Athlete	Nationality	Time
1	Worknesh Degefa	Ethiopia	2:23:31
2	Edna Kiplagat	Kenya	2:24:13
3	Jordan Hasay	United States	2:25:20
4th	Meskerem Assefa	Ethiopia	2:25:40
5th	Des Linden	United States	2:27:00
6th	Caroline Rotich	Kenya	2:28:27
7th	Mary Ngugi	Kenya	2:28:33
8th	Biruktayit Degefa	Ethiopia	2:29:10
9th	Lindsay Flanagan	United States	2:30:07
10th	Betsy Saina	Kenya	2:30:32

Wheelchair men's results
Place	Athlete	Nationality	Time
1	Daniel Romanchuk	United States	1:21:36
2	Masazumi Soejima	Japan	1:24:30
3	Marcel Hug	Switzerland	1:24:42

Wheelchair women's results
Place	Athlete	Nationality	Time
1	Manuela Schär	Switzerland	1:34:19
2	Tatyana McFadden	United States	1:41:35
3	Madison de Rozario	Australia	1:41:36
