= Galen Rupp =

American long-distance runner (born 1986)

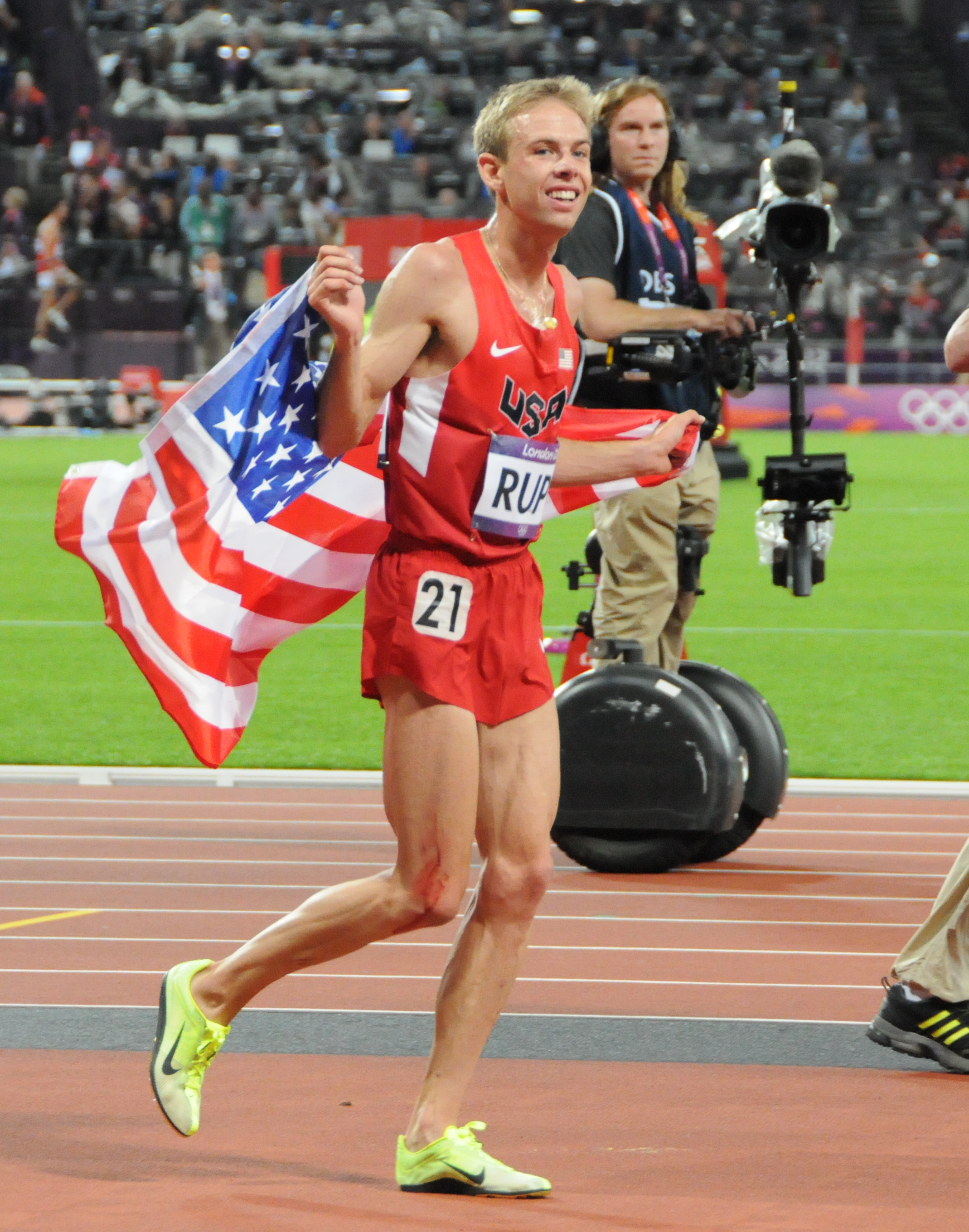
- Rupp at the 2012 Summer Olympics

Personal information
- Born: May 8, 1986 (age 40) Portland, Oregon, U.S.
- Height: 5 ft 10 in (178 cm)
- Weight: 135 lb (61 kg)

Sport
- Country: United States
- Sport: Athletics/Track, Long-distance running
- Events: 10,000 meters, 5000 meters, 3000 meters, 1500 meters, Half marathon, Marathon
- College team: Oregon Ducks
- Club: Nike
- Turned pro: June 2009
- Coached by: Mike Smith

Achievements and titles
- Olympic finals: 2008 Beijing; 10,000 m, 13th; 2012 London; 10,000 m, Silver; 5000 m, 7th; 2016 Rio de Janeiro; 10,000 m, 5th; Marathon, Bronze; 2020 Tokyo; Marathon, 8th
- World finals: 2007 Osaka; 10,000 m, 11th; 2009 Berlin; 10,000 m, 8th; 2011 Daegu; 10,000 m, 7th; 5000 m, 9th; 2013 Moscow; 10,000 m, 4th; 5000 m, 8th; 2015 Beijing; 10,000 m, 5th; 5000 m, 5th
- Personal bests: 1500 m: 3:34.15 (Brussels 2014); Mile: 3:52.11 (London 2013); 5000 m: 12:58.90 (Eugene 2012); 10,000 m: 26:44.36 (Eugene 2014); Indoors; 800 m: 1:49.87i OT (Seattle 2009); 1500 m: 3:34.78i+ (Boston 2013); Mile: 3:50.92i (Boston 2013); 3000 m: 7:30.16i (Stockholm 2013); 2-mile: 8:07.41i (Boston 2014); 5000 m: 13:01.26i (Boston 2014); Road; Half marathon: 59:47 (Rome 2018); Marathon: 2:06:07 (Prague 2018)
Medal record
Men's athletics
Representing the United States
Olympic Games
Silver medal – second place	2012 London	10,000 m
Bronze medal – third place	2016 Rio de Janeiro	Marathon
Pan American Junior Championships
Gold medal – first place	2003 Bridgetown	5000 m
World Marathon Majors
Gold medal – first place	2017 Chicago	Marathon
Silver medal – second place	2017 Boston	Marathon
Silver medal – second place	2021 Chicago	Marathon

Galen Rupp (born May 8, 1986) is an American long-distance runner. He competed in the Summer Olympics in 2008 in Beijing, 2012 in London, 2016 in Rio de Janeiro and 2021 in Tokyo. He won the silver medal in the men's 10,000 meters in London and the bronze medal in the men's marathon in Rio de Janeiro. Rupp competed for the University of Oregon and trained under Alberto Salazar as a member of the Nike Oregon Project. He won the 2017 Chicago Marathon, becoming the first American to do so since Khalid Khannouchi in 2002. Rupp won the marathon at the 2020 United States Olympic Trials (marathon) in Atlanta with a time of 2:09:20, and qualified for the 2020 Tokyo Olympic Games, where he finished eighth.

Rupp holds or held multiple U.S. records at the high school, collegiate and senior levels. He is considered to be one of the greatest American distance runners of all time.

== Early career (2002–2004) ==
Born in Portland, Oregon, into a Catholic family of German descent, Rupp set junior and American high school records while competing for Portland, Oregon's Central Catholic High School. Originally a soccer player, he caught the eye of American marathon legend Alberto Salazar, who coached him to great high school success, including two Oregon state titles in cross country (2002 and 2003) and three individual championships in track and field (the 1500 meters in 2004 and the 3000 meters in 2003 and 2004). After winning the Oregon state title in cross country in 2003, he went on to finish second nationally in the 2003 Foot Locker Cross Country Championships. In the spring of 2004, Rupp won his 5000 meters heat against college runners at the Stanford Cardinal Invitational with a time of 13:55.32, fourth-best in U.S. prep history. He went on to break the Oregon state records for the 1500 m (3:45.3) and the mile (4:01.8), the latter mark being the ninth-best in American high school history at the time.

In June 2004, Rupp broke the U.S. high school record for the 3000 m with a time of 8:03.67 (since broken by German Fernandez), also breaking the high school record for the 2000 meters en route (5:18.5). On July 31 in Heusden-Zolder, Belgium, he broke Gerry Lindgren's 40-year-old U.S. high school record for the 5000 m by almost seven seconds, with a time of 13:37.91 for the event. He finished his high school career with a 10,000-meter race in 29:09.56 in Brasschaat, Belgium, which was the fourth-fastest ever for an American high schooler. He was the Track and Field News "High School Athlete of the Year" in 2004.

Rupp delayed entering college, instead continuing to train and compete while coached by Salazar. He won the USA Junior Cross Country title in mid-February 2005 then placed 20th at the 2005 World Junior Cross Country Championships in France in mid-March. He then enrolled at the University of Oregon in time for the outdoor track season.

== Collegiate career (2005–2009) ==
On May 7, 2005, at the Oregon Twilight Meet, Rupp broke Rudy Chapa's U.S. junior (age 19 and under) record for the 10,000 m with a time of 28:25.52, which is still the current North American and Pan American junior record. Two months later, he placed second in the same event at the NCAA Men's Outdoor Track and Field Championship. On July 17, 2005, Rupp broke Gerry Lindgren's U.S. junior record for the 3000 m in Lignano, Italy, with a time of 7:49.16, which is also the current North American and Pan American junior record.

After he led the team in the Willamette Invitational (sixth) and Pre-NCAA Invitational (12th), an injury brought Rupp's 2005 cross country season to an early end.

In indoor track, Rupp placed fifth in the 5000 m and sixth in the 3000 m at the 2006 NCAA indoor championships, earning All-American status in both events. His 2006 outdoor season was brief due to the onset of hypothyroidism.

Rupp returned to cross country in 2006 to defeat two-time Pac-10 champion Robert Cheseret, Bernard Lagat's brother, of the University of Arizona to become Oregon's 10th male runner to win a Pac-10 Conference cross country title. He also led a young Oregon team to victory over the Stanford Cardinal, who had won the previous six Pac-10 titles. Rupp went on to finish sixth in the 2006 NCAA Men's Cross Country Championship.

The following March, Rupp capped his indoor season by placing third in the 5000 m and fourth in the 3000 m at the 2007 NCAA Men's Indoor Track and Field Championship. He began his outdoor season by running a 28:35 over the 10,000 m at Stanford. During the race, he caused some controversy by frequently slowing down to wait for another athlete. On April 20, 2007, Rupp made a huge comeback in the last 200 meters of a 5000-meter race to edge out Chris Solinsky, improving his personal best to 13:30. On April 29, 2007, Rupp defeated a stellar field to win the men's 10,000 m at the Payton Jordan Cardinal Invitational at Stanford. Rupp's time of 27:33.48 set an American-born NCAA Collegiate Record for the event and also gave him the seventh-fastest time in U.S. history. Two weeks later, Rupp won the 10,000 m and 5000 m at the Pac-10 conference meet and helped Oregon to the team title. As in his freshman year, he went on to finish second in the 10,000 m at the NCAA Outdoor Track and Field Championships.

Rupp made his global senior debut at the 2007 World Championships in Athletics and came in 11th at the 10,000 m.

A few months later, Rupp finished second – one second behind the winner, Liberty University's Josh McDougal – and led the Oregon Ducks to the 2007 NCAA men's cross country team championship.

Rupp redshirted the 2008 college track season to focus on the 10,000 m at the 2008 U.S. Olympic Track and Field Trials, where he finished second (27:43.11), earning a spot on the 2008 U.S. Olympic team. He went on to finish 13th at the 2008 Olympics with an U.S. Olympic–record time of 27:36.99.

Recovering from the Olympics, Rupp avoided the early 2008 cross country season, running his first race at the Pac-10 Conference Championships, which he won in a course-record 22:55 in the 8000-meter run. He then repeated as NCAA West Regional champion by running 27:41.24 to win the 10,000 m. In the 2008 NCAA national cross country championships, Rupp won his first individual NCAA title by out-kicking Liberty University's Sam Chelanga in a time of 29:03.8, a new course record on the Terre Haute, Indiana, site, and leading the Ducks to repeat as NCAA team champions.

Rupp's 2009 track season was a resounding success. Indoors, he joined the sub-4:00 club for the one-mile run on March 7 with a time of 3:57.86 at the Husky Last Chance Qualifier Meet in Seattle. On February 13, 2009, he broke the U.S. indoor 5000 m record with a time of 13:18.12 at the Tyson Invitational in Fayetteville, Arkansas. At the NCAA indoor nationals, he won an unprecedented three events: the 5000 m (13:41.45), the distance medley relay (running a 3:57.07 as the 1600 m anchor leg only 90 minutes after his 5000 m victory), and the 3000 m (7:48.94) the next day. This triple victory helped Oregon win its first-ever indoor national team title.

Outdoors, Rupp helped break the NCAA 4 x mile record on May 10. He ran a time of 3:58.93 as the anchor the relay, which also included his Oregon teammates Matthew Centrowitz Jr. (3:59.53), Andrew Wheating (3:59.60) and Shadrack Kiptoo-Biwott (4:05.21), and they shaved a little more than one second off the old record with their time of 16:03.24. After helping Oregon defend its Pac-10 title, Rupp won the 5000 m and 10,000 m at the 2009 NCAA Division I outdoor track championships. In all, Rupp earned 14 All-American honors at Oregon, along with five individual championships, a relay championship, two NCAA cross country team titles and an indoor track NCAA team title.

In his last appearance for the University of Oregon, Rupp won the 10,000 m at the 2009 USA Outdoor Track & Field Championships at Hayward Field with a time of 27:52.53.

In 2009, Rupp won the inaugural Bowerman Award, which is given to college track's Athlete of the Year.

== Professional career ==
=== 2009–2010 ===
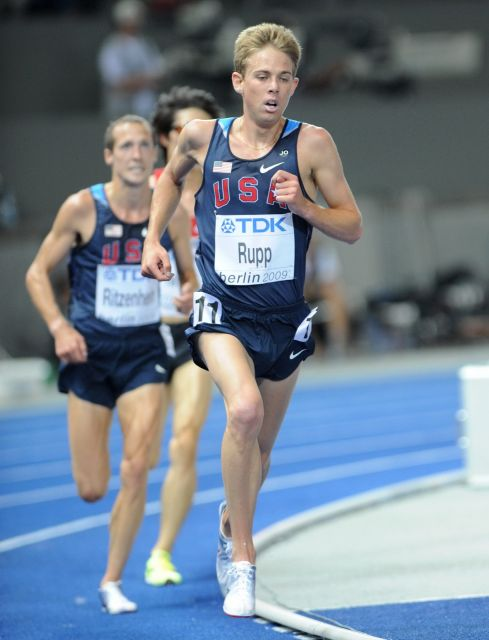
Rupp at the 2009 World Championship in Berlin

Having earned himself a place on the U.S. team for the 2009 World Championships in Athletics, Rupp announced that he was turning pro and that Michael Johnson would be his agent. At the World Championships, Rupp placed eighth in the 10,000 m, in which he was one of only two non-Africans in the top 12 alongside Dathan Ritzenhein.

He then qualified for and competed at the 2010 IAAF World Indoor Championships, where he set a personal best of 7:42.40 for the 3000 m, taking fifth place in the final.

Rupp knocked more than 20 seconds off his previous 10,000 m personal best with a time of 27:10.74 in Palo Alto, California, at the Payton Jordan Stanford Invitational. Before that race, the U.S. record was 27:13.98 set by Meb Keflezighi, and though Rupp's time was over three seconds faster, he was beaten to the punch by Chris Solinsky, who won the race with a new U.S. record of 26:59.60. Two months later, Rupp retained his national title in the 10,000 m with a win at the 2010 USA Outdoor Track and Field Championships. Rupp competed on the 2010 IAAF Diamond League circuit and made a series of improvements to his personal records: he broke four minutes for the one-mile run at the Pre Classic, running it in 3:57.72, set an outdoor 3000 m personal best of 7:43.24 at the London Grand Prix, and then improved his 5000 m time to 13:07.35 at the season-ending Weltklasse Zürich meeting.

=== 2011 ===
Rupp took part in the Great Edinburgh Cross Country in 2011 and finished second behind Mo Farah, helping the U.S. team to second place. He then took part in the New York City Half Marathon, his debut at that distance and finished third in a time of 1:00:30, at the time making him the third-fastest American at the distance. At the 2011 USA Outdoor Track and Field Championships, he once again retained his national 10,000 m title, running the last 800 meters in a quick 1:52.59 to seal his victory, and came back the next day to finish third in the 5000 m. In July, he improved his 5000 m personal best to 13:06.86 at the Diamond League meeting in Birmingham, England, out-sprinting the reigning world cross country champion, Imane Merga, for second place behind winner, Mo Farah.

At the 2011 World Championships in Athletics, Rupp finished seventh in the 10,000 m with a seasonal best of 27:26.84. He then doubled back to run the 5000 m, and though he was in the lead with Farah with a little more than a lap remaining, he was out-kicked and finished in ninth place with a time of 13:28.64.

Rupp finished his track season with a new U.S. record in the 10,000 m when he ran in 26:48.00 to finish third behind winner, Kenenisa Bekele, at the Memorial Van Damme meet on September 16, 2011. This time made Rupp the 16th-fastest performer in history for that distance.

=== 2012 ===
Rupp broke Bernard Lagat's U.S. indoor two-mile run record on February 11, 2012, when he won the event at the USA Track & Field Classic meet in Fayetteville, Arkansas, in a time of 8:09.72. (Lagat reclaimed the record in 2013 at the Millrose Games in New York City.) In June, Rupp became the sixth American to break 13 minutes for the 5000 m when he ran 12:58.90 at the Prefontaine Classic. He won the 10,000 m at the 2012 United States Olympic Trials in a time of 27:25.33, which set a new Trials record, breaking Meb Keflezighi's time of 27:36.49 from 2004, and secured Rupp's second trip to the Olympic Games.

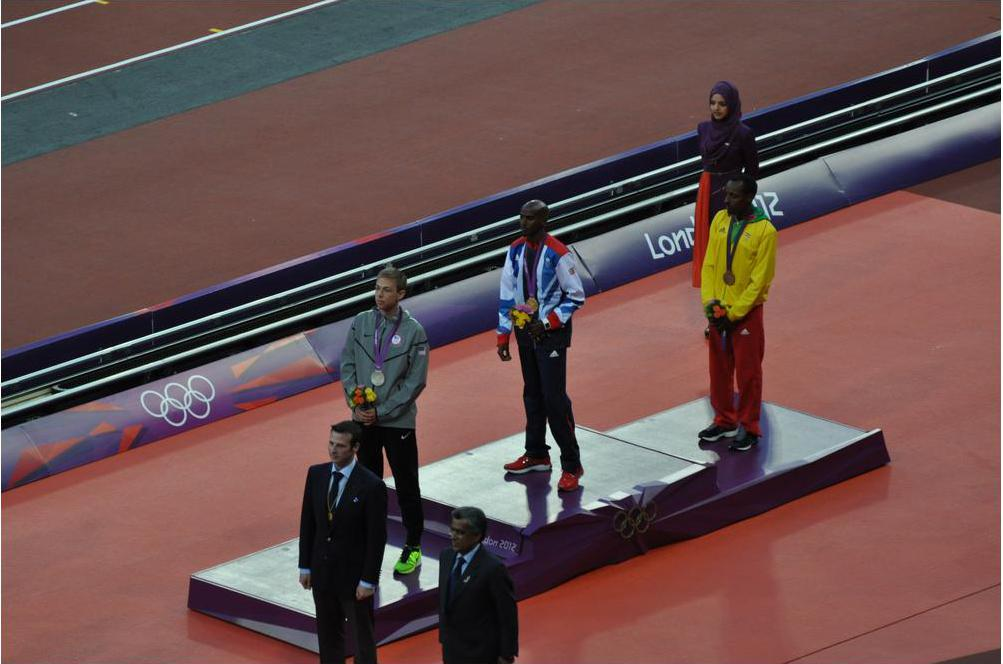
Rupp on the medal podium at the 2012 Olympics

On June 28, 2012, Rupp broke Steve Prefontaine's last remaining record – his Olympic Trials 5000 m record from 1972 – winning the race in 13:22.67.

On August 4, 2012, at the London Olympic Games, Rupp took a surprise silver medal for the 10,000 m behind his training partner Mo Farah with a time of 27:30:90, after running his last lap in 53.8 seconds. This was the first time a U.S. man had earned a medal in the Olympic 10,000 m in 48 years, the last being Billy Mills's gold in the 1964 Olympics. On August 8, 2012, Rupp advanced to the final of the 5000 m with a sixth-place finish in 13:17.56. Two days later, in the 5000-meter Olympic final, Rupp placed seventh in 13:45.04.

=== 2013 ===
On January 26, 2013, at the indoor Terrier Classic at Boston University, Rupp attempted to break the U.S. indoor one-mile run record, winning with a time of 3:50.92 – the fifth-fastest at the time – in a field that included four other sub-four-minute performers. Among Americans, Rupp's time was behind only that of Bernard Lagat. Rupp placed second at the Boston Indoor Grand Prix 3000 m. On February 21, 2013, he broke Lagat's national indoor 3000 m record by more than two seconds with a time of 7:30.16 at the XL Galan meet in Stockholm, Sweden.

During the start of his 2013 outdoor season, he did not finish the 5000 m at the Oxy High Performance Meet, but he placed second in the 1500 m with a time of 3:36.98. He placed sixth in the Prefontaine Classic 5000 m. At the 2013 USA Track & Field Championships, he won his fifth-consecutive outdoor 10,000 m title, finishing with a time of 28:47.32. His teammate, Dathan Ritzenhein, led the last four laps or so, but he was out-kicked by Rupp in the end. He was also the runner-up in the 5000 m to Bernard Lagat. These finishes qualified Rupp for two events at the IAAF World Championships in Moscow. He raced the 5000 m at the Monaco Diamond League Meet, where there were rumors of him and Lagat going after the U.S. record. However, Rupp came out on top because Lagat did not finish, and no U.S. record was broken that day. At the London Diamond League meet, his last event before Moscow, he raced in the Emsley Carr Mile, in which he was the top American in an international field, even though he is a 10,000 m specialist. He set an outdoor personal best of 3:52.11, beating out a field that included his 1500 m specialist teammate Matthew Centrowitz.

On August 10, 2013, at the 14th IAAF World Championships in Moscow, Russia, Rupp placed fourth in the 10,000 m final with a 27:24.39, a seasonal-best performance. He followed up that performance with a time of 13:29.87 run in the 5000 m finals, placing eighth.

=== 2014 ===
Rupp set the U.S. indoor 5000 m record at Boston University on January 16, 2014, with a time of 13:01.26, breaking Lopez Lomong's previous record of 13:07.00.

On January 25, Rupp set the U.S. record for the indoor two miles with a time of 8:07.41, breaking the previous record of 8:09.49 by Bernard Lagat on February 16, 2013.

On May 30, Rupp finished with a time of 26:44.36 at the Prefontaine Classic in the 10,000 m, breaking his own U.S. record of 26:48.00, which was set on September 16, 2011.

On June 27, Rupp won his sixth-consecutive 10,000 m title at the USA Outdoor Track and Field Championships with a time of 28:12.07.

On June 10 and July 5, Rupp attempted to break the U.S. record for the outdoor 5000 m but was unsuccessful both times.

In its annual World Rankings issue in 2014, Track & Field News magazine recognized Rupp as the world's top athlete in the 10,000 m, marking the first time an American runner claimed the No. 1 position since the 1985 season.

=== 2015 ===
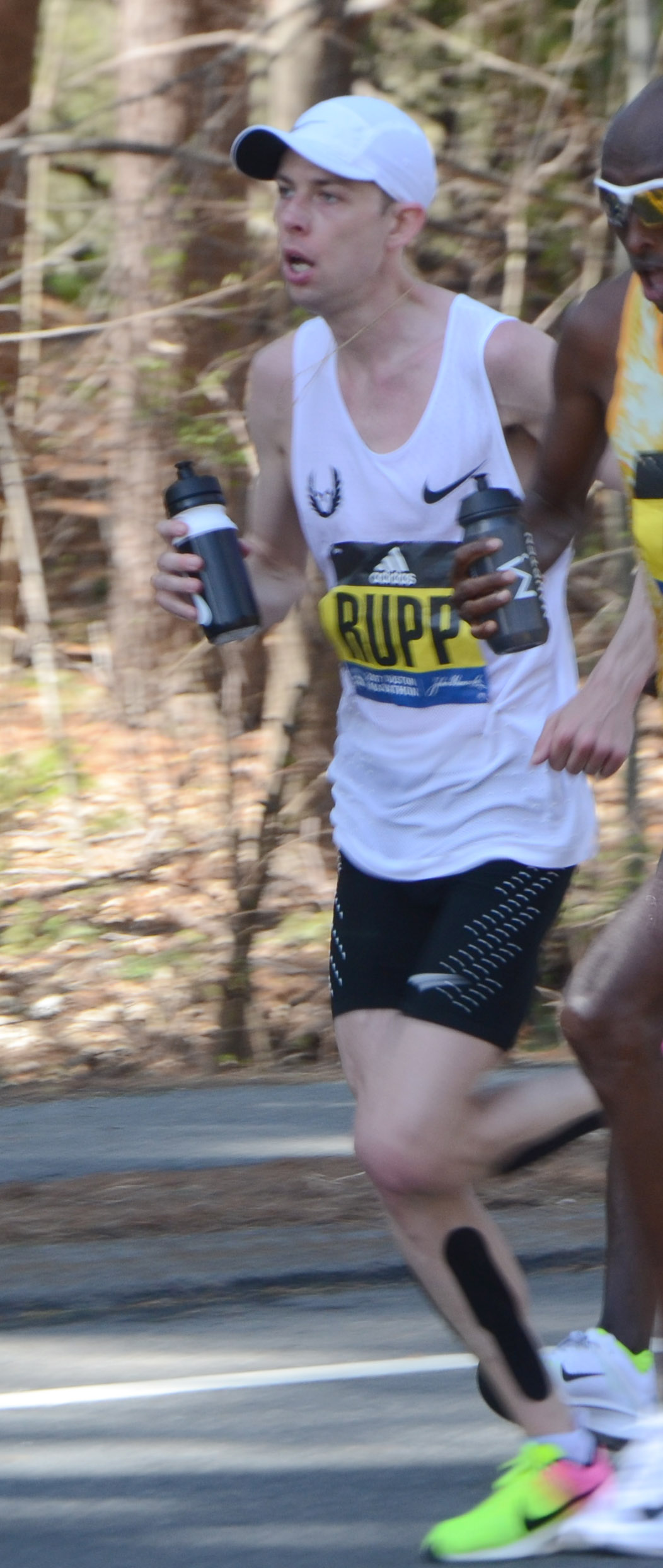
Galen Rupp approaching the halfway point of the 2017 Boston Marathon, in which he placed second

At the 2015 USA Outdoor Track and Field Championships, Rupp won his seventh-consecutive 10,000 m national title, finishing with a time of 28:11.61 – less than three seconds ahead of runner-up Ben True.

On August 22, 2015, in the 10,000 m at the 2015 World Championships in Athletics, Rupp ran with the breakaway lead pack of his training partner Mo Farah and three Kenyan athletes, as they tried to act as a team to beat Farah. Farah started a long kick, resulting in a 54.15 last lap for the victory; Rupp placed fifth with a time of 27:08.91.

=== 2016 ===
On February 13, 2016, Rupp qualified for the U.S. National Team for the 2016 Rio Olympics as a marathoner. It was the first marathon that Rupp had competed in, becoming the second American runner in history to win the Olympic marathon trials on their first attempt. He beat second-place finisher, Meb Keflezighi, by over a minute, recording the winning time of 2:11:13 on a warm day in Los Angeles.

A few months later, on July 1, Rupp won the 10,000 m at the United States Olympic Trials with a time of 27:55.04, qualifying for the Olympics in a second event. At the same meet, he placed ninth over the 5000 m.

At the 2016 Summer Olympics in Rio de Janeiro, Rupp placed fifth in the 10,000 m. Eight days later, he finished third and earned a bronze medal in the Olympic Marathon with a time of 2:10:05.

=== 2017 ===
On April 1, 2017, Rupp placed 11th in the Prague Half Marathon, finishing with a time of 1:01:59. On April 17, he finished second in the 2017 Boston Marathon with a time of 2:09:58, which was 21 seconds behind winner, Geoffrey Kirui.

On September 4, Rupp won the Faxon Law New Haven Road Race – a 20,000-meter road race in New Haven, Connecticut – with a time of 59:04, holding off Leonard Korir at the finish line, while Sam Chelanga finished in third place with a time of 59:16.

On October 8, Rupp won the Bank of America Chicago Marathon with a time of 2:09:20, becoming the first American male to win the race since Khalid Khannouchi in 2002 and the first American-born runner to win since Greg Meyer in 1982.

=== 2018 ===
On March 11, 2018, Rupp won the Roma-Ostia Half Marathon with a time of 59:47, becoming the second American to run a half marathon in under 60 minutes. He fell short of Ryan Hall's U.S. record by four seconds.

At the 2018 Boston Marathon, Rupp dropped out of the race near the 20-mile mark, just before Heartbreak Hill.

On May 6, Rupp won the Prague Marathon, setting a new personal best of 2:06:07.

On October 7, Rupp finished fifth at the Chicago Marathon with a time of 2:06:21. The race was won convincingly by his former training partner Mo Farah, who finished in 2:05:11.

Rupp underwent surgery on October 19 to correct a condition called Haglund's syndrome, a bony bump on his heel that was causing his Achilles tendon to fray. The condition is believed to be a congenital disorder. He has the bumps on both heels, though to date only the left one has been problematic.

=== 2019–2020 ===
Controversy rose when Rupp's former coach Alberto Salazar was accused of providing his athletes with performance-enhancing drugs. In October 2019, Salazar was given a four-year ban from athletics by the United States Anti-Doping Agency.

On February 29, 2020, Rupp won the 2020 United States Olympic Marathon Trials in Atlanta with a time of 2:09:20. This is his second victory at the event, having also won in 2016.

=== 2021 ===
Rupp finished eighth in the Olympic Marathon, which was held in Sapporo, Japan, on August 8, 2021. He ran with the leaders through the first 30 kilometers but could not match the move made by eventual winner, Eliud Kipchoge, finishing three minutes and three seconds behind him with a time of 2:11:41.

In September, Rupp placed third in the Great North Run – the second-largest half marathon in the world – which was won by Marc Scott.

Weeks later, Rupp placed second in the Chicago Marathon in warm and windy conditions with a time of 2:06:35.

=== 2022 ===
After battling repeated injuries and illness, Rupp placed 19th at the marathon at the World Athletics Championships held in July, but stated that he was improving.

In November, Rupp made his debut in the New York City Marathon. However, he dropped out of the race before the 30-kilometer mark, as he could not keep up with the leading pack after Evans Chebet of Kenya made a move near the 25-kilometer mark.

=== 2023 ===
Rupp headed into 2023 in poor health after multiple DNFs in 2022 and running injured in the 2022 World Marathon championships. He ran one race in the Spring- the NYC Half Marathon, but finished well back in 17th place with a time 1:04:57. This was not a competitive showing by Rupp's standards.

Rupp focused the rest of his year in building up for the Chicago Marathon, a race he has run 4 times including a win in 2017 and runner up finish in 2021. He did not race otherwise as he put all of his training towards his marathon buildup. Rupp indicated he was healthy prior to the race and had not been in the NYC Half 7 months prior or at any race in 2022. He was hoping to run under the Olympic standard of 2:08:10, which no American men had hit prior to the race. Rupp ran in a pack with fellow Americans Conner Mantz, Daniel Mesfun, and Sam Chelanga. All four were on pace for a sub-2:07 finish as late as 30K, but Rupp faded to an eighth place finish of 2:08:48 and missed out on the standard. Mantz and Clayton Young would both hit the Olympic standard in the race. This was Rupp's first healthy marathon in two years since the 2021 Chicago Marathon.

=== 2024 ===
In the 2024 United States Olympic Marathon Trials held in Orlando, Florida, Rupp finished in 16th place in 2:14:07, 5 minutes behind Olympic qualifiers Conner Mantz and Clayton Young.

=== 2026 ===
At the 2026 Chicago Marathon Rupp broke the American masters division marathon record by over three minutes, finishing in 2:06:55 and 11th place overall.

== Personal life ==
Rupp is married to Keara Rupp. They have four children: twins born in July 2014, another born in November 2016 and another born in February 2019.

== Doping allegations ==
Rupp was at the center of doping allegations involving the Nike Oregon Project, in which he was a participant. Rupp's coach Alberto Salazar was accused of providing Rupp with testosterone injections and gravity drip infusions of the supplement L-carnitine in violation of antidoping rules. According to Steve Magness, a former assistant coach with the Oregon Project, Salazar had been providing Rupp with testosterone as early as 2002, when Rupp was 16. Salazar and Rupp both denied the allegations. In October 2019, it was announced that Salazar, as well as Nike consultant Dr. Jeffrey Brown, would be banned from the sport by the United States Anti-Doping Agency for a period of four years due to the trafficking of testosterone, the prohibited use of L-carnitine and tampering with doping controls. Salazar disputed the findings and planned to appeal. In January 2020, Rupp announced his new coach would be Mike Smith, who is the head coach at Northern Arizona University.

== Competition record ==
Representing the United States
Year	Competition	Venue	Position	Event	Time
2003	World Youth Championships	Sherbrooke, Canada	7th	3000 m	8:10.42 PB
2003	Pan American Junior Championships	Bridgetown, Barbados	1st	5000 m	14:20.29 PB
2004	World Junior Championships	Grosseto, Italy	9th	5000 m	13:52.85 PB
2005	World Cross Country Championships	Saint-Galmier, France	20th	Junior race	25:05
2005	Pan American Junior Championships	Windsor, Canada	4th	1500 m	3:50.96
2007	World Championships	Osaka, Japan	11th	10,000 m	28:41.71
2008	Olympic Games	Beijing, China	13th	10,000 m	27:36.99 SB
2009	World Championships	Berlin, Germany	8th	10,000 m	27:37.99 SB
2010	World Indoor Championships	Doha, Qatar	5th	3000 m	7:42.40 PB
2011	World Championships	Daegu, South Korea	7th	10,000 m	27:26.84 SB
2011	World Championships	Daegu, South Korea	9th	5000 m	13:28.64
2012	World Indoor Championships	Istanbul, Turkey	12th	1500 m	3:43.39 PB
2012	Olympic Games	London, United Kingdom	2nd	10,000 m	27:30.90
2012	Olympic Games	London, United Kingdom	7th	5000 m	13:45.04
2013	World Championships	Moscow, Russia	4th	10,000 m	27:24.39 SB
2013	World Championships	Moscow, Russia	8th	5000 m	13:29.87
2014	World Indoor Championships	Sopot, Poland	4th	3000 m	7:55.84
2015	World Championships	Beijing, China	5th	10,000 m	27:08.91 SB
2015	World Championships	Beijing, China	5th	5000 m	13:53.90
2016	Olympic Games	Rio de Janeiro, Brazil	5th	10,000 m	27:08.92 SB
2016	Olympic Games	Rio de Janeiro, Brazil	3rd	Marathon	2:10:05 PB
2021	Olympic Games	Sapporo, Japan	8th	Marathon	2:11:41
2022	World Championships	Eugene, OR, United States	19th	Marathon	2:09:36
Road races
2017	Boston Marathon	Boston, MA, United States	2nd	Marathon	2:09:58 PB
2017	Chicago Marathon	Chicago, IL, United States	1st	Marathon	2:09:20 PB
2018	Boston Marathon	Boston, MA, United States	—	Marathon	DNF
2018	Prague Marathon	Prague, Czech Republic	1st	Marathon	2:06:07 PB
2018	Chicago Marathon	Chicago, IL, United States	5th	Marathon	2:06:21
2019	Chicago Marathon	Chicago, IL, United States	—	Marathon	DNF
2021	Chicago Marathon	Chicago, IL, United States	2nd	Marathon	2:06:35 SB
2023	New York Half Marathon	New York, NY, United States	17th	Half Marathon	1:04:57
2023	Chicago Marathon	Chicago, IL, United States	8th	Marathon	2:08:48
2026	Chicago Marathon	Chicago, IL, United States	11th	Marathon	2:06:55

=== USA National Championships ===
==== Outdoor Track and Field ====
Year	Competition	Venue	Position	Event	Time	Notes
2007	USA Outdoor Championships	Indianapolis, Indiana	2nd	10,000 m	28:23.31	
2008	US Olympic Trials	Eugene, Oregon	8th (h)	5000 m	13:59.14^{1} SB	
2008	US Olympic Trials	Eugene, Oregon	2nd	10,000 m	27:43.11 SB	
2009	USA Outdoor Championships	Eugene, Oregon	1st	10,000 m	27:52.53 SB	
2010	USA Outdoor Championships	Des Moines, Iowa	1st	10,000 m	28:59.29	
2011	USA Outdoor Championships	Eugene, Oregon	1st	10,000 m	28:38.17 SB	
2011	USA Outdoor Championships	Eugene, Oregon	3rd	5000 m	13:25.52 SB	
2012	US Olympic Trials	Eugene, Oregon	1st	10,000 m	27:25.33 CR/TR/SB	
2012	US Olympic Trials	Eugene, Oregon	1st	5000 m	13:22.67 TR	
2013	USA Outdoor Championships	Des Moines, Iowa	1st	10,000 m	28:47.32 SB	
2013	USA Outdoor Championships	Des Moines, Iowa	2nd	5000 m	14:54.91	
2014	USA Outdoor Championships	Sacramento, California	1st	10,000 m	28:12.07	
2015	USA Outdoor Championships	Eugene, Oregon	1st	10,000 m	28:11.61 SB	
2015	USA Outdoor Championships	Eugene, Oregon	3rd	5000 m	13:51.54	
2016	US Olympic Trials	Eugene, Oregon	1st	10,000 m	27:55.04 SB	
2016	US Olympic Trials	Eugene, Oregon	9th	5000 m	13:41.09	
2017	USA Outdoor Championships	Sacramento, California	5th	10,000 m	29:04.61	
2021	US Olympic Trials	Eugene, Oregon	6th	10,000 m	27:59.43 SB	

^{1}Did not start the final

==== Indoor Track and Field ====
Year	Competition	Venue	Position	Event	Time	Notes
2010	USA Indoor Championships	Albuquerque, New Mexico	2nd	3000 m	8:13.49	
2011	USA Indoor Championships	Albuquerque, New Mexico	2nd	3000 m	7:59.91	
2012	USA Indoor Championships	Albuquerque, New Mexico	3rd	1500 m	3:48.44 SB	
2012	USA Indoor Championships	Albuquerque, New Mexico	3rd	3000 m	7:57.36 SB	
2014	USA Indoor Championships	Albuquerque, New Mexico	2nd	3000 m	7:48.19	
2016	USA Indoor Championships	Portland, Oregon	8th	3000 m	7:48.34 SB	

==== Road Running ====
Year	Competition	Venue	Position	Event	Time	Notes
2016	US Olympic Trials	Los Angeles, California	1st	Marathon	2:11:12 PB	
2017	US 20 km Champs	New Haven, Connecticut	1st	20 km	59:04	
2020	US Olympic Trials	Atlanta, Georgia	1st	Marathon	2:09:20	
2024	2024 United States Olympic trials	Orlando, Florida	16th	Marathon	2:14:07	Did not qualify

=== NCAA championships ===
==== Outdoor Track and Field ====
Year	Competition	Venue	Position	Event	Time	Notes
Representing Oregon
2005	NCAA Outdoor Championships	Sacramento, California	2nd	10,000 m	28:23.75	
2006	NCAA Outdoor Championships	Sacramento, California	20th (h)	5000 m	14:14.02	
2007	NCAA Outdoor Championships	Sacramento, California	2nd	10,000 m	28:56.19	
2009	NCAA Outdoor Championships	Fayetteville, Arkansas	1st	10,000 m	28:21.45 SB	
2009	NCAA Outdoor Championships	Fayetteville, Arkansas	1st	5000 m	14:04.12	

==== Indoor Track and Field ====
Year	Competition	Venue	Position	Event	Time	Notes
Representing Oregon
2006	NCAA Indoor Championships	Fayetteville, Arkansas	5th	5000 m	13:56.41	
2006	NCAA Indoor Championships	Fayetteville, Arkansas	6th	3000 m	8:07.85	
2007	NCAA Indoor Championships	Fayetteville, Arkansas	3rd	5000 m	13:40.38	
2007	NCAA Indoor Championships	Fayetteville, Arkansas	4th	3000 m	7:56.79	
2009	NCAA Indoor Championships	College Station, Texas	1st	5000 m	13:41.45	
2009	NCAA Indoor Championships	College Station, Texas	1st	DMR	9:29.59	
2009	NCAA Indoor Championships	College Station, Texas	1st	3000 m	7:48.94	

==== Cross Country ====
Year	Competition	Venue	Position	Event	Time	Notes
Representing Oregon
2006	NCAA Cross Country Championships	Terre Haute, Indiana	6th	10 km	31:03.0	
2007	NCAA Cross Country Championships	Terre Haute, Indiana	2nd	10 km	29:23.4	
2008	NCAA Cross Country Championships	Terre Haute, Indiana	1st	10 km	29:03.2 CR	

== Personal bests ==
Surface	Distance	Time	Date	Event	Location	Notes
Outdoor track	800 m	1:50.00	May 2, 2009	Payton Jordan Invitational	Palo Alto, CA, United States	
Outdoor track	1500 m	3:34.15	September 5, 2014	Memorial Van Damme	Brussels, Belgium	
Outdoor track	Mile	3:52.11	July 27, 2013	Anniversary Games	London, United Kingdom	
Outdoor track	3000 m	7:43.24	August 13, 2010	London Grand Prix	London, United Kingdom	
Outdoor track	5000 m	12:58.90	June 2, 2012	Prefontaine Classic	Eugene, OR, United States	U.S.: formerly 6th on all-time list; now 8th
Outdoor track	10,000 m	26:44.36	May 30, 2014	Prefontaine Classic	Eugene, OR, United States	World: 15th on all-time list
Indoor track	800 m	1:49.87 OT	February 28, 2009	MPSF Indoor Track & Field Championships	Seattle, WA, United States	
Indoor track	1500 m	3:34.78+	January 26, 2013	Boston University Terrier Classic	Boston, MA, United States	U.S.: 2nd on all-time list
Indoor track	Mile	3:50.92	January 26, 2013	Boston University Terrier Classic	Boston, MA, United States	U.S.: formerly 2nd on all-time list; now 4th World: formerly 5th on all-time list; now 9th
Indoor track	3000 m	7:30.16	February 21, 2013	XL Galan	Stockholm, Sweden	World: 7th on all-time list
Indoor track	2 mile	8:07.41 AB	January 25, 2014	Boston University Terrier Classic	Boston, MA, United States	World: formerly 6th on all-time list; now 7th
Indoor track	5000 m	13:01.26	January 16, 2014	Boston University Limited Open Meet	Boston, MA, United States	World: 7th on all-time list
Road racing	5 km	13:39	November 26, 2010	Silicon Valley Turkey Trot	San Jose, CA, United States	
Road racing	10 km	28:09+	March 11, 2018	Roma-Ostia Half Marathon	Rome, Italy	
Road racing	15 km	42:43+	March 11, 2018	Roma-Ostia Half Marathon	Rome, Italy	
Road racing	20 km	56:48+	March 11, 2018	Roma-Ostia Half Marathon	Rome, Italy	
Road racing	Half marathon	59:47	March 11, 2018	Roma-Ostia Half Marathon	Rome, Italy	U.S.: 2nd on all-time list
Road racing	Marathon	2:06:07	May 6, 2018	Prague Marathon	Prague, Czech Republic	U.S.: 2nd on all-time list

=== Record performances ===
Distance	Time	Date	Location	Notes
3000 m	8:03.67	June 23, 2004	Richmond, Canada	HSR until June 19, 2008
5000 m	13:37.91	July 31, 2004	Heusden, Belgium	HSR, NU20R until May 2, 2009
3000 m (i)	7:58.02i OT	March 5, 2005	Seattle, Washington	NU20R until February 14, 2009
10,000 m	28:15.52	May 7, 2005	Eugene, Oregon	NU20R
3000 m	7:49.16	July 17, 2005	Lignano, Italy	NU20R
10,000 m	27:33.48	April 29, 2007	Palo Alto, California	CR until April 24, 2009, ACR until April 29, 2012
3000 m (i)	7:44.69i	February 7, 2009	Boston, Massachusetts	ACR until February 11, 2012
5000 m (i)	13:18.12i	February 13, 2009	Fayetteville, Arkansas	CR until February 11, 2012, ACR, NR until February 6, 2010
4 × mile	16:03.24	May 9, 2009	Eugene, Oregon	CR
5000 m (i)	13:11.44i	February 19, 2011	Birmingham, England	NR until February 11, 2012
10,000 m	26:48.00	September 16, 2011	Brussels, Belgium	NR until May 30, 2014
2 mile (i)	8:09.72	February 11, 2012	Fayetteville, Arkansas	NR until February 10, 2013
10,000 m	27:25.33	June 22, 2012	Eugene, Oregon	TR
5000 m	13:22.67	June 28, 2012	Eugene, Oregon	TR
3000 m (i)	7:30.16	February 21, 2013	Stockholm, Sweden	NR until January 27, 2023
5000 m (i)	13:01.26	January 16, 2014	Boston, Massachusetts	NR until February 12, 2022
2 mile (i)	8:07.41	January 25, 2014	Boston, Massachusetts	NR until February 11, 2024
10,000 m	26:44.36	May 30, 2014	Eugene, Oregon	NR Until March 7, 2022

Awards
Preceded by —	The Bowerman (Men's winner); 2009	Succeeded by (United States) Ashton Eaton
Preceded by Tommy Skipper	Track & Field News High School Boys Athlete of the Year; 2004	Succeeded by J-Mee Samuels
