= Yigrem Demelash =

Ethiopian long-distance runner

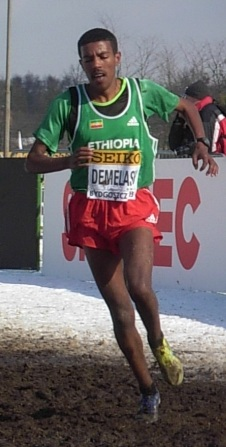
- Yigrem Demelash at the 2013 World Cross Country Championships

Medal record

Men's athletics

Representing Ethiopia

IAAF World U20 Championships
Gold medal – first place	2012 Barcelona	10,000 m

Yigrem Demelash (born 26 January 1994) is an Ethiopian long-distance runner. He was the 2012 World Junior champion in the 10,000 metres. He holds a personal best of 26:57.56 minutes for that event.

His first high-profile competition was the 2011 Great Ethiopian Run, where he finished as runner-up to Mosinet Geremew. He began competing in Europe the following year and at the Paderborn 10K was again second to his compatriot Mosinet Geremew. On the track, he ran a 5000 metres personal best of 13:03.30 minutes at the Bislett Games in Oslo before going on to secure the 10,000 metres gold medal at the 2012 World Junior Championships in Athletics, overturning a history of Kenyan dominance at that event. He closed his season with a run of 26:57.56 minutes in the 10,000 m at the Memorial Van Damme, setting an Ethiopian junior record. This race was the fastest of the year so his fourth-place finish translated into fourth in the world rankings for the season.

He entered the senior ranks in 2013 and promptly finished second at the Jan Meda International – Ethiopia's cross country championships. He was unable to repeat this form at the 2013 IAAF World Cross Country Championships, however, and in 69th place he was the last man of his team to finish. He was again involved in the fastest 10,000 m of the season, this time his run of 27:15.51 minutes brought him seventh on the yearly rankings. He missed most of the 2014 season, with the highlight being a runner-up finish behind Abera Kuma at the Zevenheuvelenloop road race.

Demelash had a stellar 2016 season, topping the world rankings, and emerging as a favorite to medal at the Olympics. At the 2016 Summer Olympics in Rio de Janeiro, Demelash competed in the Men's 10,000 metres, finishing in 4th place, only one hundredth of a second behind his teammate, Tamirat Tola. Demelash made a strong surge in the last 10 metres, but Tola was able to reach the finish line quickly enough to elude him.

== Personal bests ==
- 3000 metres – 7:59.87 min (2013)
- 5000 metres – 13:03.30 (2012)
- 10,000 metres – 26:51.11 (2016)
- 10K run – 27:54 (2012)

== International competitions ==
Year	Competition	Venue	Position	Notes
2012	World Junior Championships	Barcelona, Spain	1st	10,000 metres
2013	World Cross Country Championships	Bydgoszcz, Poland	69th	Senior race
