= Athletics at the 2016 Summer Olympics – Men's 10,000 metres =

Men's 10,000 metres at the Games of the XXXI Olympiad
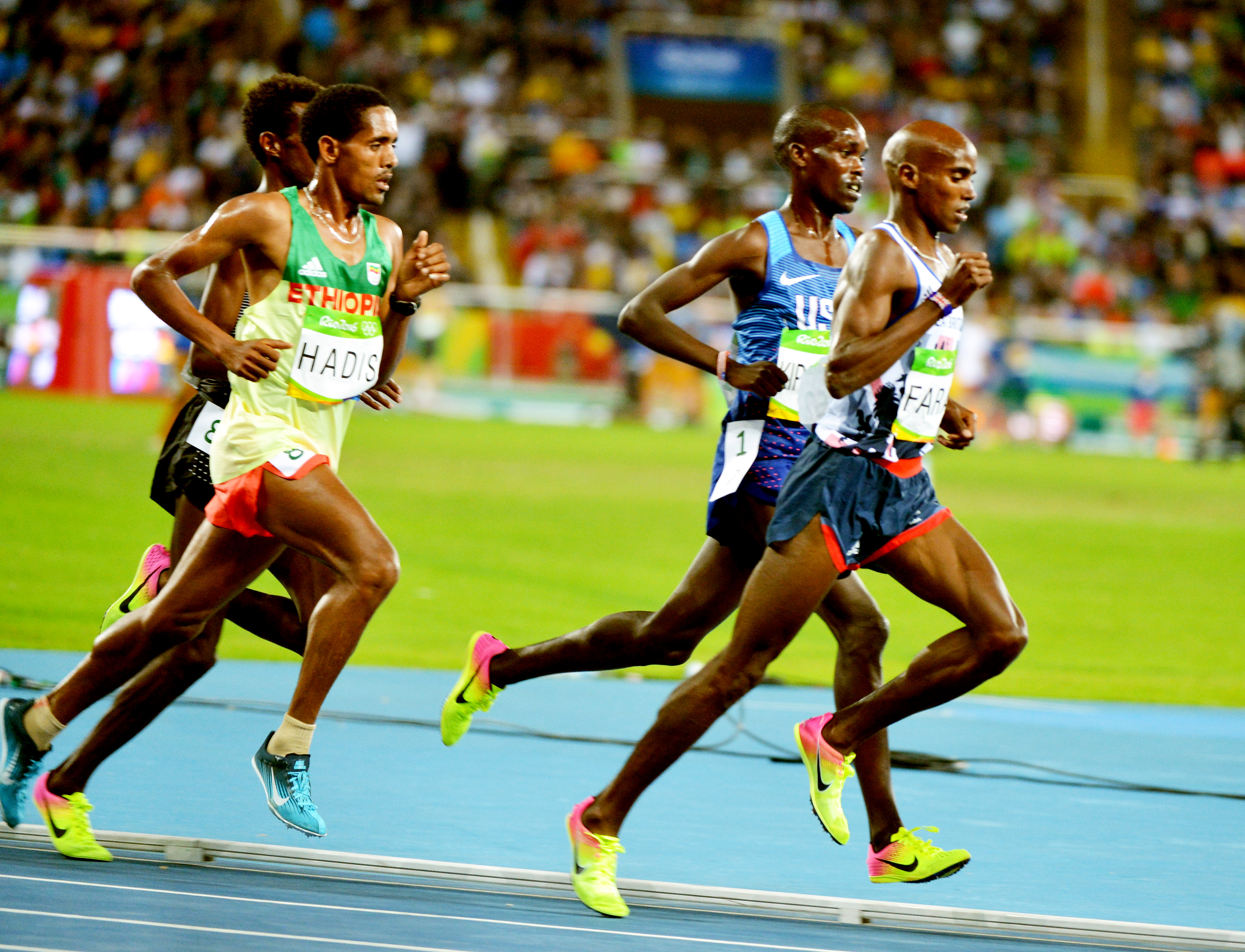
- Men's 10,000m winner Mo Farah
- Venue: Olympic Stadium
- Dates: 13 August 2016 (final)
- Competitors: 34 from 16 nations
- Winning time: 27:05.17

Medalists
| 1st place, gold medalist(s) | | Mo Farah | Great Britain |
| 2nd place, silver medalist(s) | | Paul Tanui | Kenya |
| 3rd place, bronze medalist(s) | | Tamirat Tola | Ethiopia |

The men's 10,000 metres event at the 2016 Summer Olympics took place on 13 August at the Olympic Stadium. In a tactical yet comparatively quick race, Great Britain's Mo Farah defended his Olympic title in 27:05.17 minutes, becoming the sixth man to win the Olympic 10,000 metres title twice. Reaching their first Olympic podium, Kenya's Paul Tanui was the silver medallist and Tamirat Tola of Ethiopia took the bronze. Farah's winning margin was 0.47 seconds.

The medals were presented by Lydia Nsekera, IOC member, Burundi and Hamad Kalkaba Malboum, Vice President of the IAAF.

== Summary ==
=== Pre-Olympics ===
Mo Farah had not been beaten in a major track championship since the 2011 World Championships (by Ibrahim Jeilan). The defending 2012 Olympic champion, Farah's time of 26:53.71 minutes was the second fastest that year. The year's rankings were topped by Yigrem Demelash of Ethiopia and the country's two other team members (Tamirat Tola and Abadi Hadis) placed in the world's top five, though none had senior international track experience. The Kenyan contingent presented the more experienced challengers to Farah. Geoffrey Kipsang Kamworor and Paul Tanui were medallists behind Farah at the 2015 World Championships. Kamworor and the third Kenyan Bedan Karoki Muchiri had beaten Farah at the 2016 IAAF World Half Marathon Championships five months earlier. American Galen Rupp – Farah's training partner and 2012 Olympic runner-up – was also a strong entrant.

=== Final ===
From the two alley waterfall start, Tanui went to the front of the pack, surrounded by his Kenyan teammates. Farah went to the back, jogging along behind the pack in dead last place and even waved to his family in the crowd. Peru's Luis Ostos got three laps in the spotlight before filtering back through the field. For the first quarter of the race, Farah stayed in last, content to let the Kenyans and three Ethiopians exchange the lead, though he was tracked by Kenya's Muchiri. On the seventh lap, Farah moved up to mark the leaders and increase the pace, his training partner Galen Rupp moving in behind him. Suddenly Farah's back kick connected with Rupp's right knee and Farah fell to the ground among the pack of runners.

The pack behind him scattered and Farah popped up quickly, his shoulder showing the scrapes of his collision with the ground. After this point the increased pace fractured the pack Farah returned to his marking position, usually fourth place behind the Kenyans with occasional surges by Ethiopians Tamirat Tola and Yigrem Demelash. Around 7000 metres and eight laps remaining, Kipsang and Karoki took their last turns at the front, but began to fade off the pace while Tamirat Tola and Yigrem Demelash took the point as the pace quickened. Breaking away from the remaining pack, the two Ethiopians, Tanui, Farah, Rupp and Joshua Kiprui Cheptegei continued in close order. With four laps to go, Farah took the lead, but instead of trying to break away, he simply defended the point.

With a lap to go, Farah had the lead, with Tanui aggressively trying to pass and the Ethiopians and Rupp still in pursuit. Coming up on a lapped runner, Tanui didn't concede space in order to pin Farah against the curb and into the back of the slower runner, the two exchanged elbows as Farah made his right of way. Tanui accelerated and took the lead before the back stretch. Farah followed Tanui as Rupp fell off the pace. Through the final turn, Tanui had the edge. Coming off the turn, Farah attacked with a gear Tanui's awkward running form could not match, building a half a second margin of victory down the final 100 metres and crossing the line with his Mobot celebration. The gap already established, Tamirat Tola passed Rupp and ran in to the bronze medal. Yigrem Demelash took fourth place after a late rush at his teammate, but missed catching him by one hundredth of a second.

Farah's gold medal gave him the shared distinction of being the most successful Olympian in the event and fifth Olympian to defend their title in the 10,000 m consecutively or following a lapse, preceded by Haile Gebrselassie and Kenenisa Bekele. Paavo Nurmi, Emil Zátopek and Lasse Viren each have won the Olympic 10,000 twice (Nurmi, non-consecutively). Zane Robertson set a New Zealand national record.

== Records ==
Prior to this competition, the existing global and area records were as follows:

| World record | Kenenisa Bekele (ETH) | 26:17.53 | Brussels, Belgium | 26 August 2005 |
| Olympic record | Kenenisa Bekele (ETH) | 27:01.17 | Beijing, China | 17 August 2008 |
| World Leading | Yigrem Demelash (ETH) | 26:51.11 | Hengelo, Netherlands | 29 June 2016 |

Area
| Area | Time (s) | Athlete | Nation |
|---|---|---|---|
| Africa (records) | 26:17.53 WR | Kenenisa Bekele | Ethiopia |
| Asia (records) | 26:38.76 | Abdullah Ahmad Hassan | Qatar |
| North, Central America and Caribbean (records) | 26:44.36 | Galen Rupp | United States |
| Europe (records) | 26:46.57 | Mo Farah | Great Britain |
| Oceania (records) | 27:23.80 | Stewart McSweyn | Australia |
| South America (records) | 27:28.12 | Marilson dos Santos | Brazil |

The following national record was established during the competition:

| Country | Athlete | Round | Time | Notes |
|---|---|---|---|---|
| New Zealand | Zane Robertson (NZL) | Final | 27:33.67 | |

== Schedule ==
All times are Brasilia Time (UTC-3)

| Date | Time | Round |
|---|---|---|
| Saturday, 13 August 2016 | 21:27 | Finals |

== Results ==
=== Final ===
| Rank | Name | Nationality | Time | Notes |
|---|---|---|---|---|
| 1st place, gold medalist(s) | Mo Farah | Great Britain | 27:05.17 | |
| 2nd place, silver medalist(s) | Paul Tanui | Kenya | 27:05.64 | SB |
| 3rd place, bronze medalist(s) | Tamirat Tola | Ethiopia | 27:06.26 | |
| 4 | Yigrem Demelash | Ethiopia | 27:06.27 | |
| 5 | Galen Rupp | United States | 27:08.92 | SB |
| 6 | Joshua Kiprui Cheptegei | Uganda | 27:10.06 | PB |
| 7 | Bedan Karoki Muchiri | Kenya | 27:22.93 | |
| 8 | Zersenay Tadese | Eritrea | 27:23.86 | |
| 9 | Nguse Tesfaldet | Eritrea | 27:30.79 | SB |
| 10 | Abraham Cheroben | Bahrain | 27:31.86 | PB |
| 11 | Geoffrey Kipsang Kamworor | Kenya | 27:31.94 | |
| 12 | Zane Robertson | New Zealand | 27:33.67 | NR |
| 13 | Polat Kemboi Arıkan | Turkey | 27:35.50 | PB |
| 14 | Leonard Korir | United States | 27:35.65 | SB |
| 15 | Abadi Hadis | Ethiopia | 27:36.34 | |
| 16 | David McNeill | Australia | 27:51.71 | |
| 17 | Suguru Osako | Japan | 27:51.94 | |
| 18 | Stephen Mokoka | South Africa | 27:54.57 | |
| 19 | Shadrack Kipchirchir | United States | 27:58.32 | SB |
| 20 | Bashir Abdi | Belgium | 28:01.49 | |
| 21 | Luis Ostos | Peru | 28:02.03 | |
| 22 | Moses Kurong | Uganda | 28:03.38 | |
| 23 | Timothy Toroitich | Uganda | 28:04.84 | SB |
| 24 | Goitom Kifle | Eritrea | 28:15.99 | |
| 25 | Andy Vernon | Great Britain | 28:19.36 | SB |
| 26 | El Hassan El-Abbassi | Bahrain | 28:20.17 | |
| 27 | Olivier Irabaruta | Burundi | 28:32.75 | |
| 28 | Ben St Lawrence | Australia | 28:46.32 | |
| 29 | Yuta Shitara | Japan | 28:55.23 | |
| 30 | Kota Murayama | Japan | 29:02.51 | |
| 31 | Ross Millington | Great Britain | 29:14.95 | |
| 32 | Mohammed Ahmed | Canada | 29:32.84 | |
| – | Hassan Chani | Bahrain | DNF | |
| – | Ali Kaya | Turkey | DNF | |
