= Lawrence Cherono =

Kenyan long-distance runner

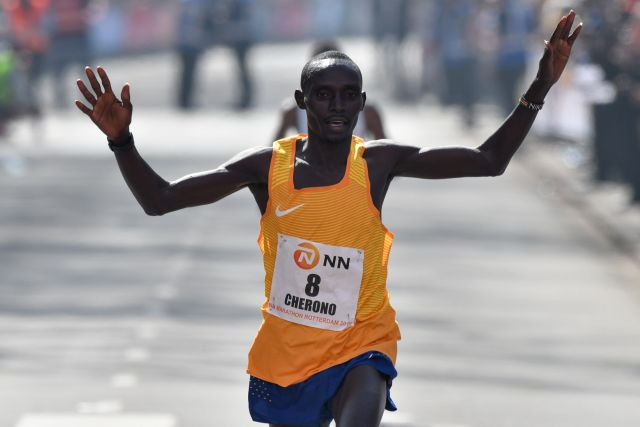
- Cherono running the Amsterdam Marathon in 2017

Personal information
- Born: 7 August 1988 (age 38) Eldoret, Kenya

Sport
- Country: Kenya
- Events: Marathon, half marathon

Lawrence Cherono (born August 7, 1988) is a Kenyan long-distance runner. He is currently the 8th fastest marathon performer of all time with his 2:03:04 clocking at the 2020 Valencia Marathon. Cherono is a past winner of both the Boston and Chicago marathons.

In 2024, Cherono received a seven-year competition ban backdated to 2022 following an admission of breaching anti-doping rules.

== Career ==
He clocked 2:09:39 to win the Honolulu Marathon on December 11, 2016.

He clocked 2:04:06 to win the Amsterdam Marathon on October 21, 2018. He also won the Amsterdam Marathon in 2017, running a time of 2:05:09, setting the course record, which he broke in 2018.

On 15 April 2019, Cherono won the Boston Marathon with a time of 2:07:57. He out-sprinted two-time Boston winner and World Championship Silver medalist Lelisa Desisa on the final block of Boylston Street.

On 13 October 2019, Cherono won the 2019 Chicago Marathon with a time of 2:05:45. He out-kicked three other runners in the final 200 meters to win the race. In 2020 Cherono raced the Valencia Marathon, where he placed 2nd in a new personal best time of 2:03:04.

He qualified to represent Kenya at the 2020 Summer Olympics. At the 2020 Tokyo Olympic Games men's marathon Cherono placed 4th getting out sprinted by Abdi Nageeye and Bashir Abdi, while Eliud Kipchoge won.

== Doping violation and competition ban ==
On July 16, 2022, Cherono was suspended from major marathons after testing positive for trimetazidine, a heart medication listed on the 2022 World Anti-Doping Agency Prohibited List as a metabolic modulator and performance-enhancing drug. On June 12, 2024, the Athletics Integrity Unit announced an additional charge against Cherono of tampering with the anti-doping process.

Following a two-year investigation during which Cherono denied the allegations, nevertheless in July 2024, Lawrence Cherono admitted to breaching three anti-doping regulations. He received a four-year ban for the use and presence of Trimetazidine and a four-year ban for tampering with the rules. The combined eight-year ban was reduced to seven years by the Athletics Integrity Unit (AIU) due to his early admission and acceptance of the sanction.

== International competitions ==
Year	Competition	Venue	Position	Notes
2014	Alger Marathon	Algiers, Algeria	2nd	2:10:16
2015	Seville Marathon	Seville, Spain	1st	2:09:39
2015	Lanzhou International Marathon	Lanzhou, China	2nd	2:12:33
2015	Shanghai Marathon	Shanghai, China	7th	2:14:22
2016	Hong Kong Marathon	Hong Kong, China	2nd	2:12:14
2016	Prague Marathon	Prague, Czech Republic	1st	2:07:24
2016	Hengshui Lake International Marathon	Hengshui, China	2nd	2:11:14
2016	Honolulu Marathon	Honolulu, United States	1st	2:09:39
2017	Rotterdam Marathon	Rotterdam, The Netherlands	2nd	2:06:21
2017	Amsterdam Marathon	Amsterdam, The Netherlands	1st	2:05:09
2017	Honolulu Marathon	Honolulu, United States	1st	2:08:27 CR
2018	London Marathon	London, Great Britain	7th	2:09:25
2018	Amsterdam Marathon	Amsterdam, The Netherlands	1st	2:04:06 CR
2019	Boston Marathon	Boston, United States	1st	2:07:57
2019	Chicago Marathon	Chicago, United States	1st	2:05:45
2021	Olympic Games	Sapporo, Japan	4th	2:10:02
2021	Valencia Marathon	Valencia, Spain	1st	2:05:12

=== World Marathon Majors Record ===
World Marathon Majors	2018	2019
Tokyo Marathon	-	-
Boston Marathon	-	1st
London Marathon	7th	-
Berlin Marathon	-	-
Chicago Marathon	-	1st
New York City Marathon	-	-
