= Athletics at the 2013 Summer Universiade – Men's 10,000 metres =

The men's 10,000 metres event at the 2013 Summer Universiade was held on 8 July.

== Medalists ==
Gold	Silver	Bronze
Stephen Mokoka; South Africa	Anatoly Rybakov; Russia	Evgeny Rybakov; Russia

== Results ==
Official Video

Rank	Name	Nationality	Time	Notes
1st place, gold medalist(s)	Stephen Mokoka	South Africa	28:45.96	
2nd place, silver medalist(s)	Anatoly Rybakov	Russia	28:47.27	
3rd place, bronze medalist(s)	Yevgeny Rybakov	Russia	28:47.28	
4	Brandon Lord	Canada	29:12.90	PB
5	Aldo Vega	Mexico	29:25.42	
6	Shota Hattori	Japan	29:28.53	
7	José Luis Duarte	Mexico	29:29.55	
8	Dessie Getnet	Ethiopia	29:35.81	
9	Amon Terer	Kenya	29:39.36	
10	Kenta Murayama	Japan	30:02.46	
11	Benjamin Njia	Uganda	30:29.41	
12	David Nilsson	Sweden	30:46.76	
13	Víctor Manuel González	Guatemala	30:51.70	
14	Mohamadou Adamou	Cameroon	31:30.18	
15	Rajendra Bind	India	31:49.15	
	Vedat Günen	Turkey	DNF	
	Vyacheslav Shalamov	Russia	DNF	
	K.C. Anup	Nepal	DNS	
	Ibrahim Omar Abdi	Djibouti	DNS	
