= Kenta Murayama =

Japanese athlete (born 1993)

Personal information
- Born: 23 February 1993 (age 32)

Sport
- Country: Japan
- Sport: Track and field
- Event(s): 5000 metres, 10,000 metres

Kenta Murayama (村山 謙太, Murayama Kenta; born 23 February 1993) is a Japanese middle-distance and long-distance runner. He competed in the 10,000 metres event at the 2015 World Championships in Athletics in Beijing, China. His twin brother, Kota, competed in the 5000m. In 2018 he finished the marathons in Gold Coast with a personal best and Berlin, where he missed a record.

== International competitions ==
Year	Competition	Venue	Position	Event	Notes
2012	World Junior Championships	Barcelona, Spain	6th	10,000 m	29:40.56
2013	Universiade	Kazan, Russia	10th	10,000 m	30:02.46
2014	World Half Marathon Championships	Copenhagen, Denmark	56th	Half marathon	1:03:52
2015	World Championships	Beijing, China	22nd	10,000 m	29:50.22

== Personal bests ==
Event	Time	Date	Place
5000 m	13:34.53	10 May 2014	Nobeoka, Japan
10,000 m	27:39.95	9 May 2015	Nobeoka, Japan
Half marathon	1:00:50	2 February 2014	Marugame, Japan
Full marathon	2:08:56	29 September 2019	Berlin, Germany
