= Worknesh Degefa =

Ethiopian long-distance road runner

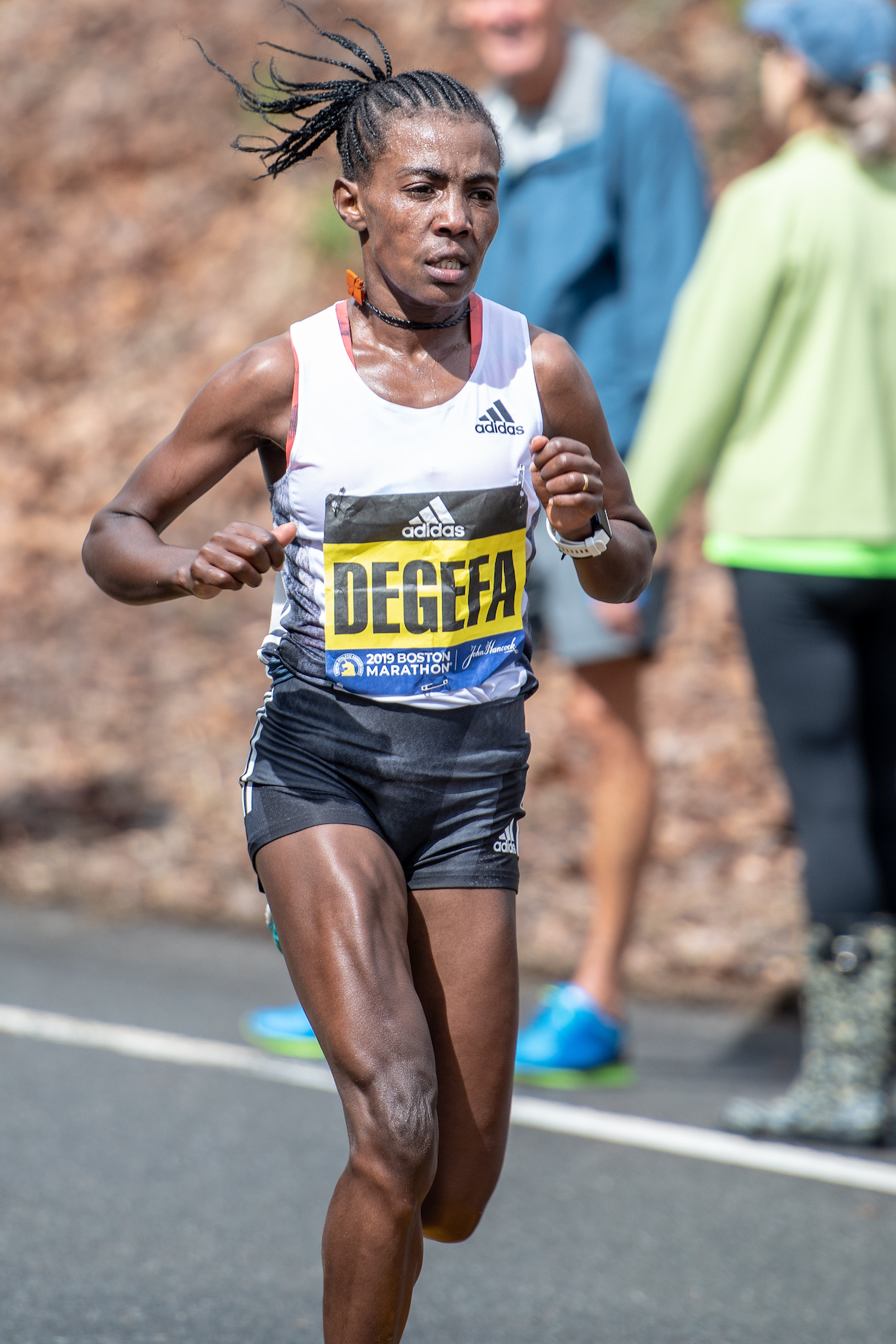
- Worknesh Degefa near the halfway point of the 2019 Boston Marathon, which she won.

Personal information
- Full name: Worknesh Degefa
- Born: October 28, 1990 (age 35) Ethiopia

Sport
- Country: Ethiopia
- Sport: Athletics
- Event(s): Marathon, half marathon
Medal record
Gold medal – first place	2017 Dubai	Marathon
Gold medal – first place	2019 Boston	Marathon
Silver medal – second place	2019 Dubai	Marathon

Worknesh Degefa (Amharic: ወርቅነሽ ደገፋ; born October 28, 1990) is an Ethiopian long-distance road runner. As of April 2019, she is the fourth-fastest female marathoner in history, based on her 2:17:41 run at the Dubai Marathon, January 25, 2019. The winner of the race in Dubai was Ruth Chepngetich, who holds the third-best marathon time. Degefa had won Dubai in 2017 in 2:22:36. She returned in 2018 to run 2:19:53, finishing fourth behind three other Ethiopians, all of whom achieved rankings in the top 25 of all time. It was the first time four women had run under 2:20 in the same race. As of April 2019, she is also ranked just outside the top 25 in the half marathon, running 1:06:14 at the Prague Half Marathon in 2016.

On April 15, 2019, Degefa won the Boston Marathon in 2:23:31 in front-running fashion, by surging away from the field only 8 km into the race, despite never having seen the course before, even in training. By the 30 km mark, she had opened up an almost 3 minute lead over the chasers. Edna Kiplagat ran down Heartbreak Hill in an effort to catch Degefa, narrowing the gap to 42 seconds by the finish.

== International competitions ==
Year	Competition	Venue	Position	Notes
2017	Dubai Marathon	Dubai, United Arab Emirates	1st	2:22:36
2017	Olomouc Half Marathon	Olomouc, Czech Republic	1st	1:09:19
2018	Dubai Marathon	Dubai, United Arab Emirates	4th	2:19:53
2018	Prague Half Marathon	Prague, Czech Republic	3rd	1:08:10
2019	Dubai Marathon	Dubai, United Arab Emirates	2nd	2:17:41
2019	Boston Marathon	Boston, United States	1st	2:23:31
