= Moses Kurong =

Ugandan long-distance runner

Personal information
- Nationality: Ugandan
- Born: 7 July 1994 (age 32)

Sport
- Sport: Athletics

Moses Martin Kurong (born 7 July 1994) is a Ugandan long-distance runner.

He represented Uganda at the 2016 Summer Olympics in Rio de Janeiro, in the men's 10,000 metres.
