= Geoffrey Kirui =

Kenyan long-distance runner

Geoffrey Kipkorir Kirui
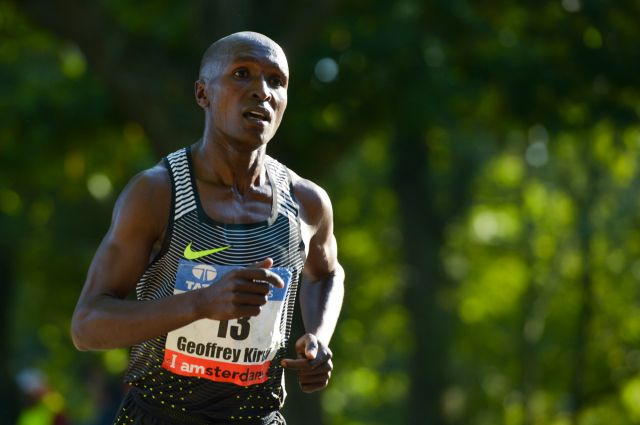
- Kirui in 2016

Personal information
- Born: 16 February 1993 (age 33) Nyeri, Kenya

Sport
- Country: Kenya
- Sport: Long-distance running
- Event: Marathon
- Team: NN Running Team
Medal record
Men's athletics
Representing Kenya
World Championships
Gold medal – first place	2017 London	Marathon

Geoffrey Kipkorir Kirui (born 16 February 1993) is a Kenyan long-distance runner who competes in cross country running competitions, track and road races up to the marathon.

== Junior career ==
Kirui won gold in the 10,000 metres at the 2011 African Junior Athletics Championships.

He won bronze in the men's 10,000 metres at the 2012 World Junior Championships in Athletics.

== Senior career ==
At the 2013 IAAF World Cross Country Championships, he finished 15th in the senior men's race.

Kirui won the 2017 Boston Marathon in 2 hours, 9 minutes, and 37 seconds. It was his third marathon.

Kirui participated in the 2017 World Championships held in London, winning the gold in the Marathon, with a time of 2:08:27.

In 2019, he competed in the men's marathon at the 2019 World Athletics Championships held in Doha, Qatar. He finished in 14th place.

In 2020 Geoffrey competed at the Valencia Marathon, however he DNF in a race won by Kenya's Evans Chebet in 2:03:00.

== Personal bests ==
Distance	Time	Location	Date
3000 Metres	7:42.26	Doha (Hamad Bin Suhaim)	10 MAY 2013
5000 Metres	13:16.68	Eugene (Hayward Field), OR	01 JUN 2013
10,000 Metres	26:55.73	Bruxelles (Boudewijnstadion)	16 SEP 2011
10 Kilometres	27:53	New Delhi	29 NOV 2015
15 Kilometres	42:43	Yangzhou	19 APR 2015
20 Kilometres	56:23	New Delhi	29 NOV 2015
Half Marathon	59:38	New Delhi	29 NOV 2015
25 Kilometres	1:13:42	Chicago, IL	12 OCT 2014
30 Kilometres	1:28:48	Chicago, IL	12 OCT 2014
Marathon	2:06:27	Amsterdam	16 OCT 2016

== Marathons ==
- 2016 Rotterdam Marathon 2:07:23 (3rd)
- 2016 Amsterdam Marathon 2:06:27 (7th)
- 2017 Boston Marathon 2:09:37 (1st)
- 2017 World Championships in Athletics 2:08:27 (1st)
- 2018 Boston Marathon 2:18:23 (2nd)
- 2018 Chicago Marathon 2:06:45 (6th)
- 2019 Boston Marathon 2:08:55 (5th)
- 2019 World Athletics Championships 2:13:54 (14th)
