= 2017 Boston Marathon =

Footrace in Boston, Massachusetts, USA

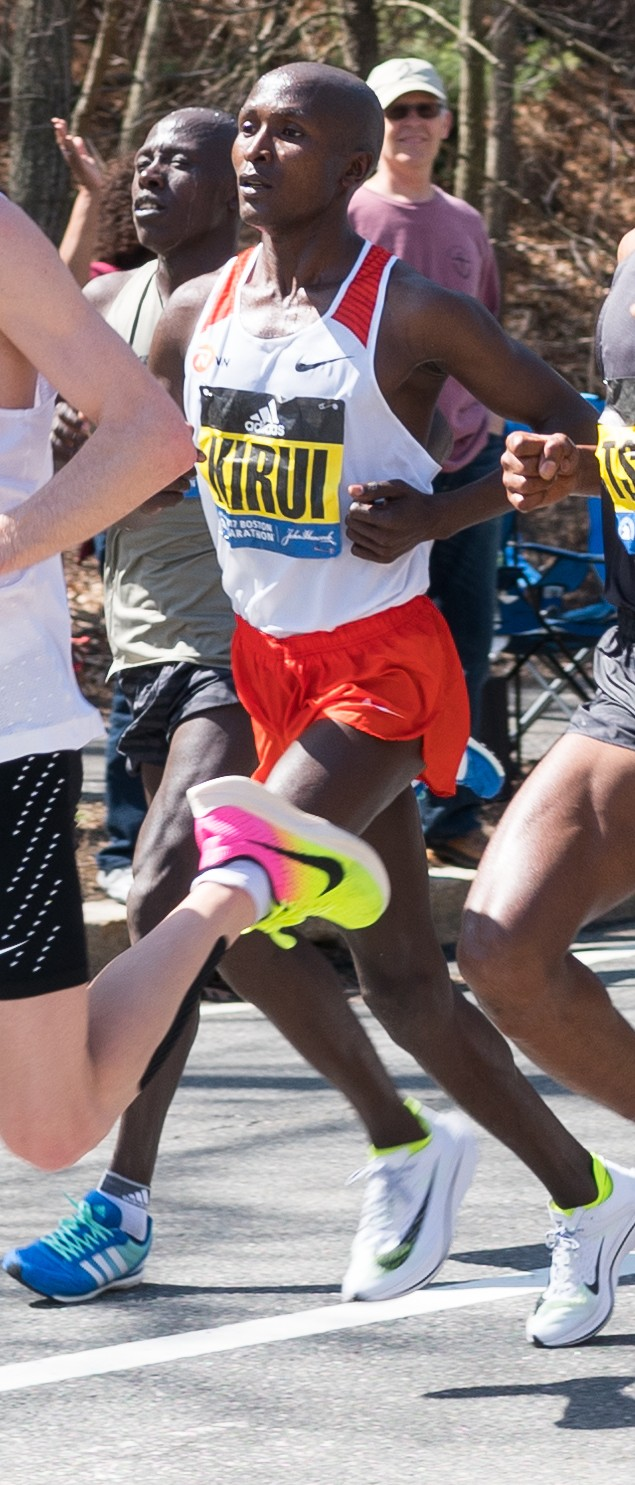
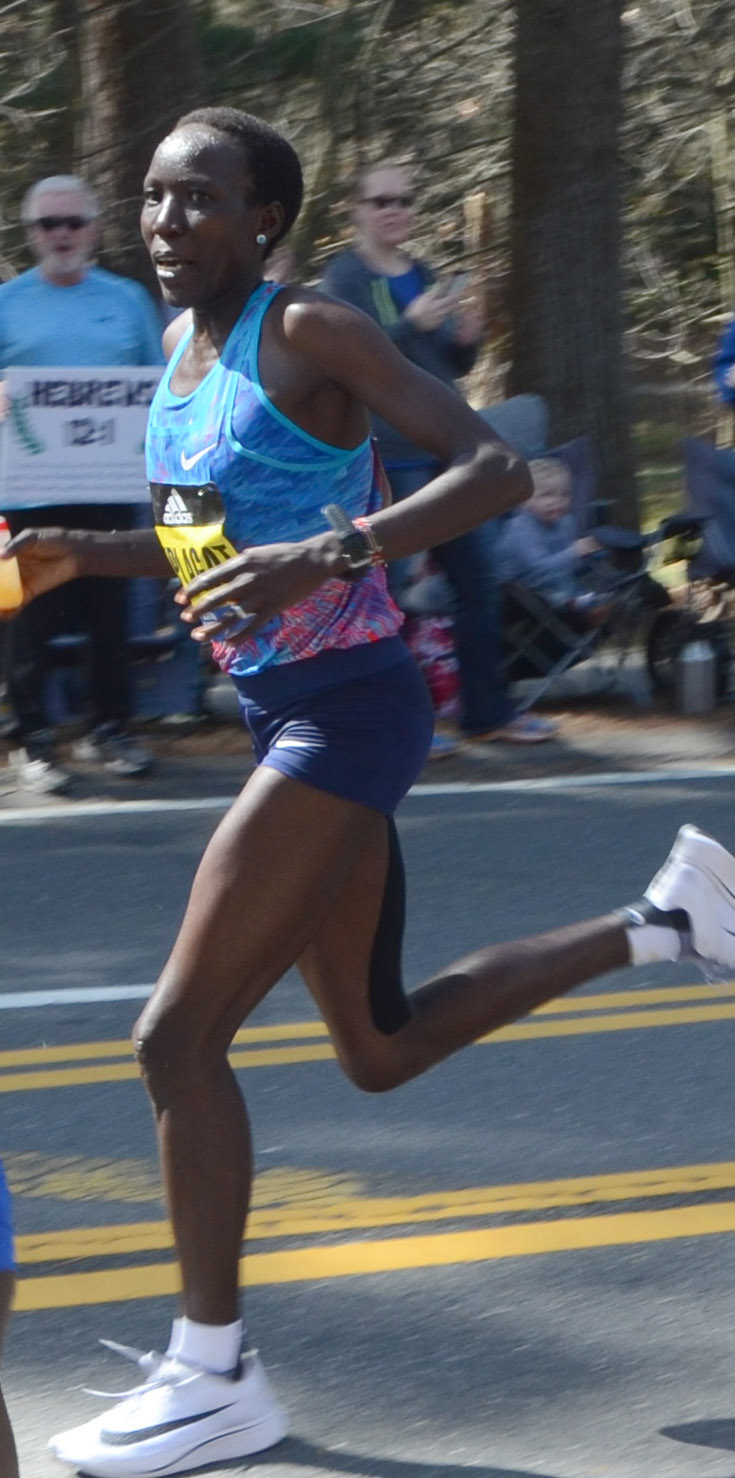
- Geoffrey Kirui and Edna Kiplagat
- Venue: Boston
- Dates: April 17

Champions
- Men: Geoffrey Kirui (2:09:37)
- Women: Edna Kiplagat (2:21:52)
- Wheelchair men: Marcel Hug (1:18:04)
- Wheelchair women: Manuela Schär (1:28:17)

The 2017 Boston Marathon was the 121st running of the Boston Athletic Association's mass-participation marathon. It took place on Monday, April 17 (Patriots' Day in Massachusetts). Geoffrey Kirui won the men's race in 2:09:37 and Edna Kiplagat won the women's race in 2:21:52.

Kathrine Switzer at age 70 ran the marathon under bib number 261, the same number she had worn 50 years previously in 1967, finishing in 4:44:31. That number was then retired from all future Boston Marathons. Women were not allowed to run marathons until 1972, but she registered under the name K. V. Switzer.

== Course ==
The event ran along the same winding course the Marathon has followed for many decades ‍—‌26 miles 385 yards (42.195 km) of roads and city streets, starting in Hopkinton and passing through six Massachusetts cities and towns, to the finish line beside the Boston Public Library, on Boylston Street in Boston's Copley Square.

== Results ==
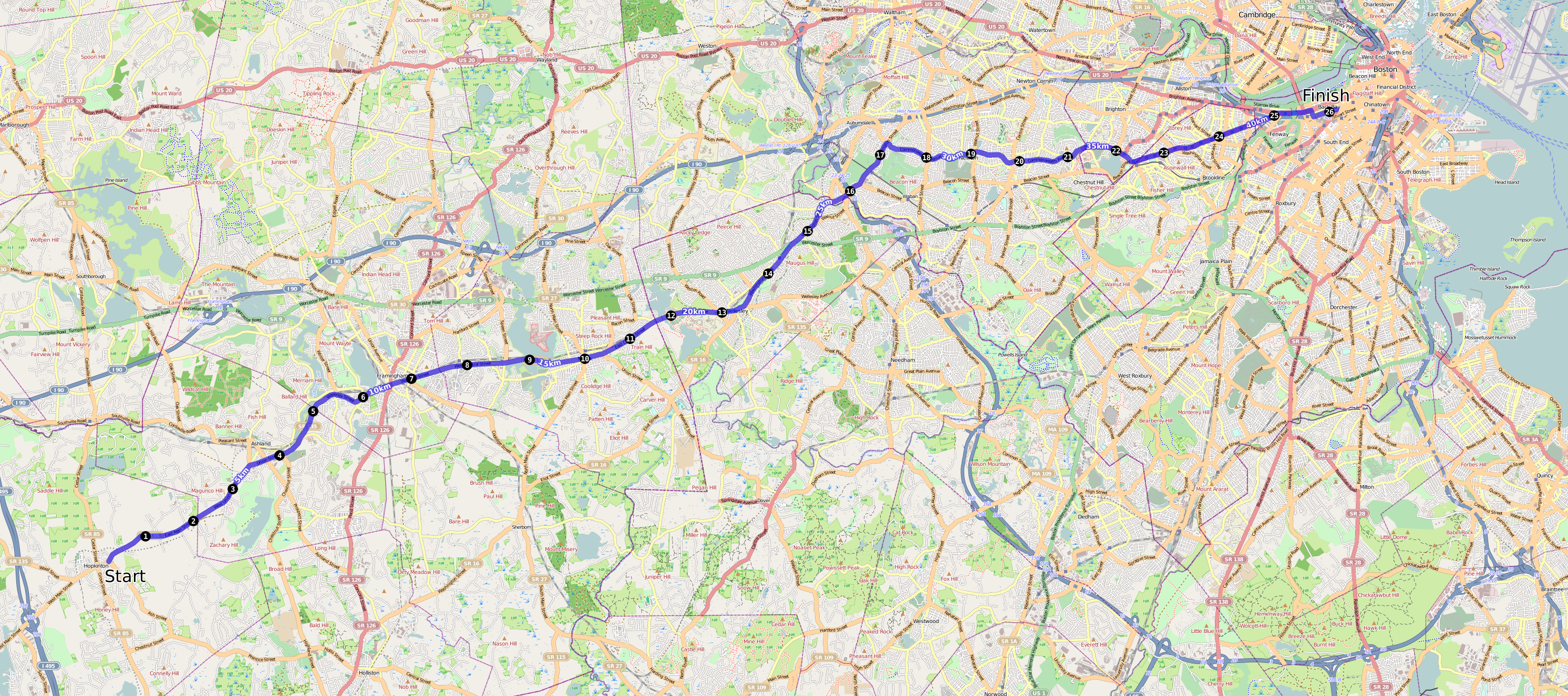
Course map

Elite Men
Place	Athlete	Nationality	Time
1	Geoffrey Kirui	Kenya	2:09:37
2	Galen Rupp	United States	2:09:58
3	Suguru Osako	Japan	2:10:28

Elite Women
Place	Athlete	Nationality	Time
1	Edna Kiplagat	Kenya	2:21:52
2	Rose Chelimo	Bahrain	2:22:51
3	Jordan Hasay	United States	2:23:00

=== Wheelchair ===
Men
Place	Athlete	Nationality	Time
1	Marcel Hug	Switzerland	1:18:04
2	Ernst van Dyk	South Africa	1:18:04
3	Hiroyuki Yamamoto	Japan	1:19:32

Women
Place	Athlete	Nationality	Time
1	Manuela Schär	Switzerland	1:28:17
2	Amanda McGrory	United States	1:33:13
3	Susannah Scaroni	United States	1:33:17
