= Djibouti at the Olympics =

- IOC code: DJI
- NOC: Comité National Olympique et Sportif Djiboutien
- Website: https://cnos-djibouti.org/
- Medals Ranked 153rd: Gold 0 Silver 0 Bronze 1 Total 1

Summer appearances
- 1984; 1988; 1992; 1996; 2000; 2004; 2008; 2012; 2016; 2020; 2024

Djibouti first participated at the Olympic Games in 1984, and has competed in every Summer Olympic Games since then, apart from 2004. The nation has never competed in the Winter Olympic Games.

Djibouti's debut came at the 1984 Summer Olympics in Los Angeles, where they fielded three athletes but did not take home a medal. Djibouti's only medal at the Olympics was won by marathon runner Hussein Ahmed Salah, who came third in the 1988 men's marathon. The country came close to its second medal at the 2016 Summer Olympics when Ayanleh Souleiman finished fourth in the men's 1500 metres. Djibouti have competed primarily in athletics, but have also participated in judo, swimming, sailing and table tennis events.

The highest number of Djiboutian athletes participating in a summer Games is eight, which occurred at the 1992 Summer Olympics in Barcelona, Spain. Djiboutian Olympians have primarily been men; the first female athlete was Roda Ali Wais who participated in the 2000 Games. Wais was also the youngest Djiboutian athlete, having competed at the age of 16 years and 62 days. Djibouti's oldest athlete to compete in the Olympics was Hussein Ahmed Salah during the 1996 Games at the age of 39 years and 217 days.

== National Olympic Committee ==
Djibouti NOC logo

The Djibouti National Olympic and Sports Committee (French: Comité National Olympique et Sportif Djiboutien) was founded in 1983, and was officially recognized by the International Olympic Committee a year later. The current president of the committee is Aïcha Garad Ali, who was appointed in 2005 and subsequently re-elected in 2013, 2017 and 2021. The current secretary general is Faissal Abdourahman.

== Olympic overview ==
=== Pre-Olympics ===
Djibouti was an overseas territory of France until it voted to declare independence in 1977. The 1980 Moscow Olympics was the first edition of the Summer Games that Djibouti would have been eligible for, but the country boycotted the event in protest of the Soviet war in Afghanistan.

=== 1984 Summer Olympics ===
The first year that Djibouti participated in the Olympic Games, they sent three athletes, all competing in the men's marathon. Djama Robleh finished eighth with a time of 2:11:39, while Hussein Ahmed Salah and Omar Abdillahi Charmarke came in 20th and 32nd place respectively.

=== 1988 Summer Olympics ===
For the 1988 Olympic Games, Djibouti doubled the number of athletes in their delegation, sending six. This was the first year that Djibouti competed in any events other than the men's marathon. Robleh Ali Adou became the first Djiboutian sailor to participate in the Olympics, placing 40th out of 45 participants in the mixed windsurfer category.

In the 1500 metres, 5000 metres, and 10000 metres events respectively, Hoche Yaya Aden, Ismael Hassan, and Talal Omar Abdillahi were all eliminated in the first heat. In the men's marathon event, Omar Moussa came in 49th place. Ahmed Salah, the only Djiboutian athlete to return from the 1984 Olympic Games, was awarded with Djibouti's only medal, a bronze for finishing third in the men's marathon with a time of 2:10:59.

=== 1992 Summer Olympics ===
Djibouti sent eight athletes, all men, to the 1992 Olympic Games, the most the country has ever done. Five of these athletes competed in athletics, two in judo and one in sailing, marking the first time Djibouti participated in judo. Both judokas, Youssef Omar Isahak and Alaoui Mohamed Taher, failed to win a match.

Robleh Ali Adou competed in the Lechner A-390 sailing event, finishing in 39th place. In athletics, Djibouti competed in four events. In the 1500 metres, 5000 metres, and 10000 metres events respectively, Houssein Djama, Moussa Souleiman, and Omar Daher Gadid were all eliminated in the first heat. In the men's marathon event, Ahmed Salah placed 30th with a time of 2:19:37 while Talal Omar Abdillahi did not finish.

=== 1996 Summer Olympics ===
Djibouti's delegation to 1996 Olympic Games consisted of five athletes, three competing in athletics and two in sailing. In the 1500 metres, Ali Ibrahim was eliminated in the first heat. In the men's marathon event, Ahmed Salah finished in 42nd place with a time of 2:20:33, while Omar Moussa failed to finish. At the age of 39 years and 217 days, Ahmed Salah set the record as Djibouti's oldest athlete competing in the Olympics. Additionally, Robleh Ali Abdou competed in the mistral race and Mohamed Youssef participated in the laser race; they finished 46th and 55th respectively.

=== 2000 Summer Olympics ===
Djibouti's delegation for the 2000 Olympic Games consisted of just two athletes, both in athletics. The sole female athlete was Roda Ali Wais, who was the first female to represent Djibouti at the Olympic Games. She also set the record as Djibouti's youngest participant in the Olympic Games, at the age of 16 years and 62 days. Wais competed in the 800 meter event, finishing last in her heat, 24.15 seconds behind the next competitor. The only male athlete was Omar Daher Gadid, who competed in the marathon but did not finish the race.

=== 2004 Summer Olympics ===
At the 2004 Olympics, Djibouti entered four athletes, two in tennis and two in athletics. For reasons unknown, none of the competitors participated in any of their events.

=== 2008 Summer Olympics ===
After an absence in the 2004 Olympic Games, Djibouti once again sent one male and one female athlete to compete at the 2008 Summer Olympics, both in athletics. Ahmed Salah was selected as the flag bearer despite not competing in the Games. Neither athlete qualified for the finals. Fathia Ali Bouraleh finished 8th in her heat during the 100 metres event, while Mahamoud Farah finished 9th in his heat in the 1500 metres event.

=== 2012 Summer Olympics ===
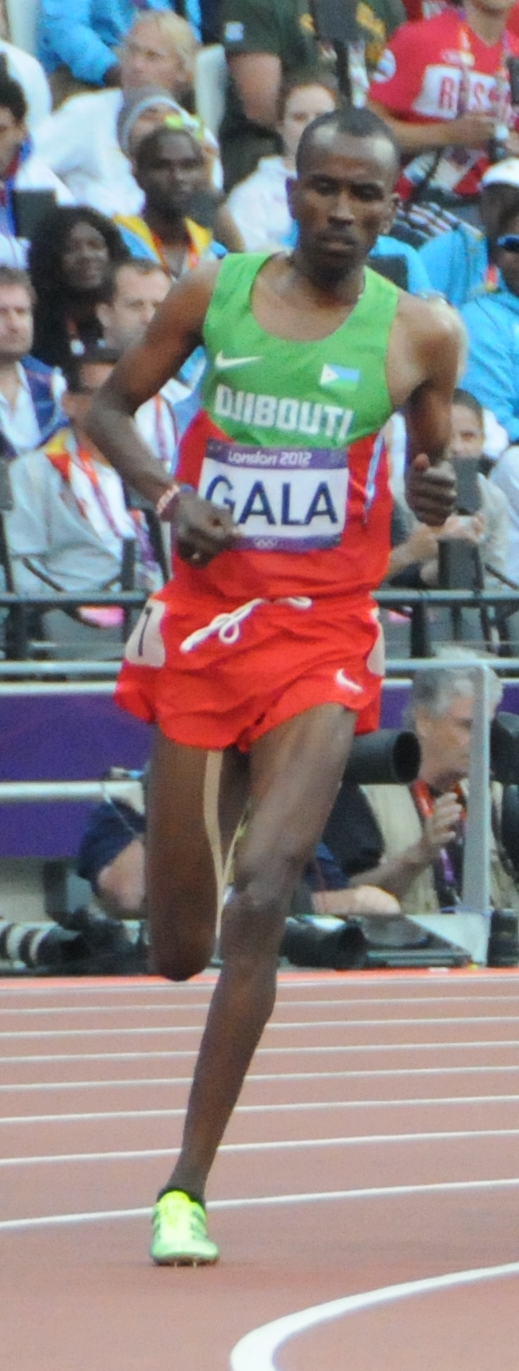
Mumin Gala competing in the 5000 metres

For the 2012 Olympic Games, Djibouti sent a delegation of five athletes, two in athletics, one in judo, one in swimming, and one in table tennis. Zourah Ali became the country's first female flagbearer.

In swimming, Abdourahman Osman competed in the 50 metre freestyle event. He finished first in his heat with a time of 27.25 seconds, but did not advance further and finished 49th overall. Yasmin Farah competed in the table tennis women's singles category, but was eliminated in the first round.

Sally Raguib, competing in the lightweight judo category, received a bye in her first round but did not start her second round match and was eliminated. In athletics, Zourah Ali participated in the 400 metres event, but came 7th in her heat and did not advance to the final. Mumin Gala, competing in the 5000 metres, qualified for the final and placed 13th.

=== 2016 Summer Olympics ===
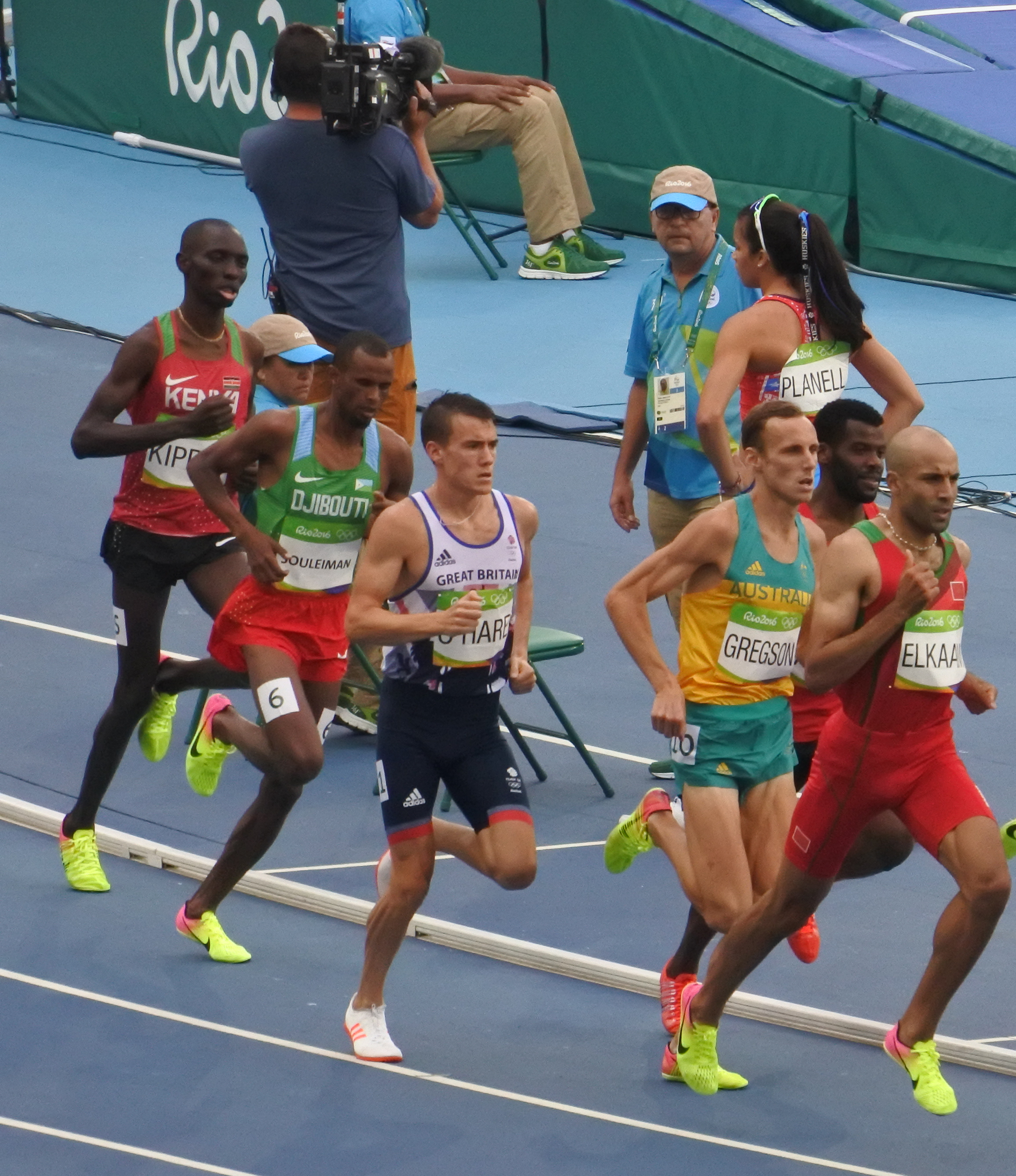
Souleiman during the 1500 metres heats

Djibouti fielded its second largest deletion for the 2016 Olympic Games, consisting of five competitors in athletics, and one each in judo and swimming.

In the 2016 Olympics, Djibouti came very close to its second-ever medal. Ayanleh Souleiman, competing in the 1500 metres, placed 3rd in his first heat and 2nd in the semifinals. In the finals, Souleiman finished in fourth place with a time of 3:50:29, 0.05 seconds away from the bronze medal and 0.29 seconds away from the gold. Souleiman also competed in the 800 metres, but failed to advance past the semifinals. Another athlete, Abdi Waiss Mouhyadin, also took part in the 1500 metres, but did not finish his heat.

In the women's 1500 metres and men's 3000 metres steeplechase events respectively, both Kadra Mohamed Dembil and Mohamed Ismail Ibrahim came 12th in their heat and did not advance further. Mumin Gala, the country's only returning Olympian from the 2012 Games, competed in the men's marathon and finished 12th overall with a time of 2:13:04.

Anass Houssein, competing in the half-lightweight judo category, received a bye in his first round but lost his match in the second round. Bourhan Abro competed in the men's 50 metre freestyle, coming 5th in his heat. He did not advance past the first round and placed 74th overall.

=== 2020 Summer Olympics ===
Djibouti sent four athletes to the 2020 Olympic Games, three men and one woman, with two competing in athletics, one in judo and one in swimming. Zourah Ali represented Djibouti at the Olympics for the first time since 2012 and participated in the women's 1500 metres, but did not finish her heat and was eliminated. Ayanleh Souleiman was due to compete in the men's 800 metres, but did not start the race. He ran in the 1500 metres, coming ninth in his heat, but was unable to finish his semifinal race.

Aden-Alexandre Houssein competed in the lightweight judo category. He received a bye in the first round, defeated his opponent in the second round but was eliminated in the third round. Houssein Gaber Ibrahim participated in the 50 metre freestyle, coming second in his heat. He did not advance past the first round and placed 65th overall.

=== 2024 Summer Olympics ===
Djibouti's delegation to the 2024 Olympic Games involved four competitors in athletics events. In the men's 5000 metres, Abdi Waiss Mouhyadin and Mohamed Ismail Ibrahim were both eliminated in the first heat and did not advance to the final. Likewise, in the women's 5000 metres, Samiyah Hassan Nour was also eliminated in the first heat. Ibrahim Hassan competed in the men's marathon and came in 14th place with a time of 2:09:31.

Djibouti also fielded two athletes in swimming and one in judo. Houmed Houssein Barkat competed in the men's 50 metre freestyle and Naima-Zahra Amison competed in the women's 50 metre freestyle. Neither athlete advanced past the first round, and they finished 54th and 75th overall respectively. Aden-Alexandre Houssein competed in the lightweight judo category, and was defeated in the first round.

== Medal tables ==
=== Medals by Summer Games ===
Games	Athletes	Gold	Silver	Bronze	Total	Rank
(United States) 1984 Los Angeles	3	0	0	0	0	–
(South Korea) 1988 Seoul	6	0	0	1	1	46
(Spain) 1992 Barcelona	8	0	0	0	0	–
(United States) 1996 Atlanta	5	0	0	0	0	–
(Australia) 2000 Sydney	2	0	0	0	0	–
(Greece) 2004 Athens	did not participate					
(China) 2008 Beijing	2	0	0	0	0	–
(United Kingdom) 2012 London	5	0	0	0	0	–
(Brazil) 2016 Rio de Janeiro	7	0	0	0	0	–
(Japan) 2020 Tokyo	4	0	0	0	0	–
(France) 2024 Paris	7	0	0	0	0	–
(United States) 2028 Los Angeles	future event					
(Australia) 2032 Brisbane	future event					
Total		0	0	1	1	153

=== Medals by sport ===
Sport	Gold	Silver	Bronze	Total
Athletics	0	0	1	1
Totals (1 entries)	0	0	1	1

== List of medalists ==
Djibouti's only medal is a bronze awarded to Hussein Ahmed Salah in the men's marathon at the 1988 Summer Olympics in Seoul, South Korea.

Medal	Name	Games	Sport	Event
Bronze	Houssein Ahmed Salah	1988 Seoul	Athletics	Men's marathon

== Flagbearers ==
Summer Olympics
Games	Athlete	Sport	Notes
1984 Los Angeles	Djama Robleh	Athletics	
1988 Seoul	Hussein Ahmed Salah	Athletics	
1992 Barcelona	No flagbearer		
1996 Atlanta	Hussein Ahmed Salah	Athletics	
2000 Sydney	Djama Robleh	Athletics	
2004 Athens	Did not participate		
2008 Beijing	Hussein Ahmed Salah	Athletics	
2012 London	Zourah Ali (opening)	Athletics	
2012 London	Yasmin Farah (closing)	Athletics	
2016 Rio de Janeiro	Abdi Waiss Mouhyadin (opening)	Athletics	
2016 Rio de Janeiro	Mohamed Ismail Ibrahim (closing)	Athletics	
2020 Tokyo	Aden-Alexandre Houssein (opening)	Judo	
2020 Tokyo	Souhra Ali Mohamed (closing)	Athletics	
2024 Paris	Mohamed Ismail Ibrahim (opening)	Athletics	
2024 Paris	Samiyah Hassan Nour (opening)	Athletics	
2024 Paris	Ibrahim Hassan (closing)	Football	
