= Djibouti at the World Athletics Championships =

- Flag of Djibouti
- WA code: DJI
- Medals: Gold 0 Silver 2 Bronze 1 Total 3

World Athletics Championships appearances (overview)
- 1983; 1987; 1991; 1993; 1995; 1997; 1999; 2001; 2003; 2005; 2007; 2009; 2011; 2013; 2015; 2017; 2019; 2022; 2023; 2025

Djibouti has taken part in every edition of the World Athletics Championships, except for 2001. Ahmed Salah was their first medalist, after placing second in the men's marathon at the 1987 World Championships in Athletics. He repeated this classification four years later, in the same event. Their third medal came in 2013 by Ayanleh Souleiman.

== Medalists ==
Medal	Name	Year	Event
Silver	Ahmed Salah	1987 Rome	Men's marathon
Silver	Ahmed Salah	1993 Stuttgart	Men's marathon
Bronze	Ayanleh Souleiman	2013 Moscow	Men's 800 metres

=== By event ===
Event	Gold	Silver	Bronze	Total
Marathon	0	2	0	2
800 metres	0	0	1	1
Totals (2 entries)	0	2	1	3

=== By gender ===
Gender	Gold	Silver	Bronze	Total
Men	0	2	1	3
Women	0	0	0	0

== See also ==
- Djibouti at the Olympics
- Djibouti at the Paralympics
