= Djibouti at the 2025 World Athletics Championships =

- Flag of Djibouti
- WA code: DJI

in Tokyo, Japan 13 September 2025 – 21 September 2025
- Competitors: 3 (2 men and 1 woman)
- Medals: Gold 0 Silver 0 Bronze 0 Total 0

World Athletics Championships appearances (overview)
- 1983; 1987; 1991; 1993; 1995; 1997; 1999; 2001; 2003; 2005; 2007; 2009; 2011; 2013; 2015; 2017; 2019; 2022; 2023; 2025

Djibouti competed at the 2025 World Athletics Championships in Tokyo, Japan, from 13 to 21 September 2025.

== Results ==
Djibouti entered three athletes to the championships: two men and one woman..

Key

- Q = Qualified for the next round
- q = Qualified for the next round as a fastest loser or, in field events, by position without achieving the qualifying target
- NR = National record
- PB = Personal best
- SB = Season best
- N/A = Round not applicable for the event

=== Men ===
Track and road events

Athlete	Event	Final	
Athlete	Event	Result	Rank
Bouh Ibrahim	Marathon	DNS	
Abdi Waiss Mouhyadin	Marathon	DNF	

=== Women ===
Track and road events

Athlete	Event	Heats		Final	
Athlete	Event	Result	Rank	Result	Rank
Samiyah Hassan Nour	5000 metres	15:00.95	9	Did not advance	
