= Djibouti at the 2016 Summer Olympics =

- IOC code: DJI
- NOC: Comité National Olympique Djiboutien

in Rio de Janeiro
- Competitors: 7 in 3 sports
- Flag bearer (opening): Abdi Waiss Mouhyadin
- Flag bearer (closing): Mohamed Ismail Ibrahim
- Medals: Gold 0 Silver 0 Bronze 0 Total 0

Summer Olympics appearances (overview)
- 1984; 1988; 1992; 1996; 2000; 2004; 2008; 2012; 2016; 2020; 2024

Djibouti competed at the 2016 Summer Olympics in Rio de Janeiro, Brazil, from 5 to 21 August 2016. The nation's participation marked its eighth appearance at the Summer Olympics. Djibouti did not field any athletes at the 2004 Summer Olympics in Athens.

The Djibouti National Olympic Committee (French: Comité National Olympique Djiboutien) sent its second largest delegation to the Games, falling one athlete short of the record eight athletes sent to compete at the Barcelona 1992 Summer Olympic Games. A total of seven athletes, six men and one woman, were selected to the Djibouti team to compete in athletics, judo, and swimming. Marathoner Mumin Gala was the only athlete returning for his second appearance from London 2012, while middle-distance runner Abdi Waiss Mouhyadin led his squad as Djibouti's flag bearer in the opening ceremony.

Djibouti failed to collect an Olympic medal in Rio de Janeiro, which would have been the country's first since the 1988 Summer Olympics in Seoul, where Hussein Ahmed Salah won the bronze in the men's marathon. Ayanleh Souleiman almost ended the nation's 28-year drought on the podium, but he slipped out of medals to fourth in the men's 1500 metres.

== Background ==
Djibouti participated in eight Summer Olympic Games between its debut in the 1984 Summer Olympics in Los Angeles, United States and the 2016 Summer Olympics in Rio de Janeiro. Djibouti made their Olympic debut in 1984, sending three athletes to the Games. The highest number of Djiboutian athletes participating in a Summer Games is eight in the 1992 Games in Barcelona, Spain. Marathon runner Hussein Ahmed Salah is the only Djiboutian athlete to win a medal, which he did in the 1988 marathon.

== Athletics (track and field) ==
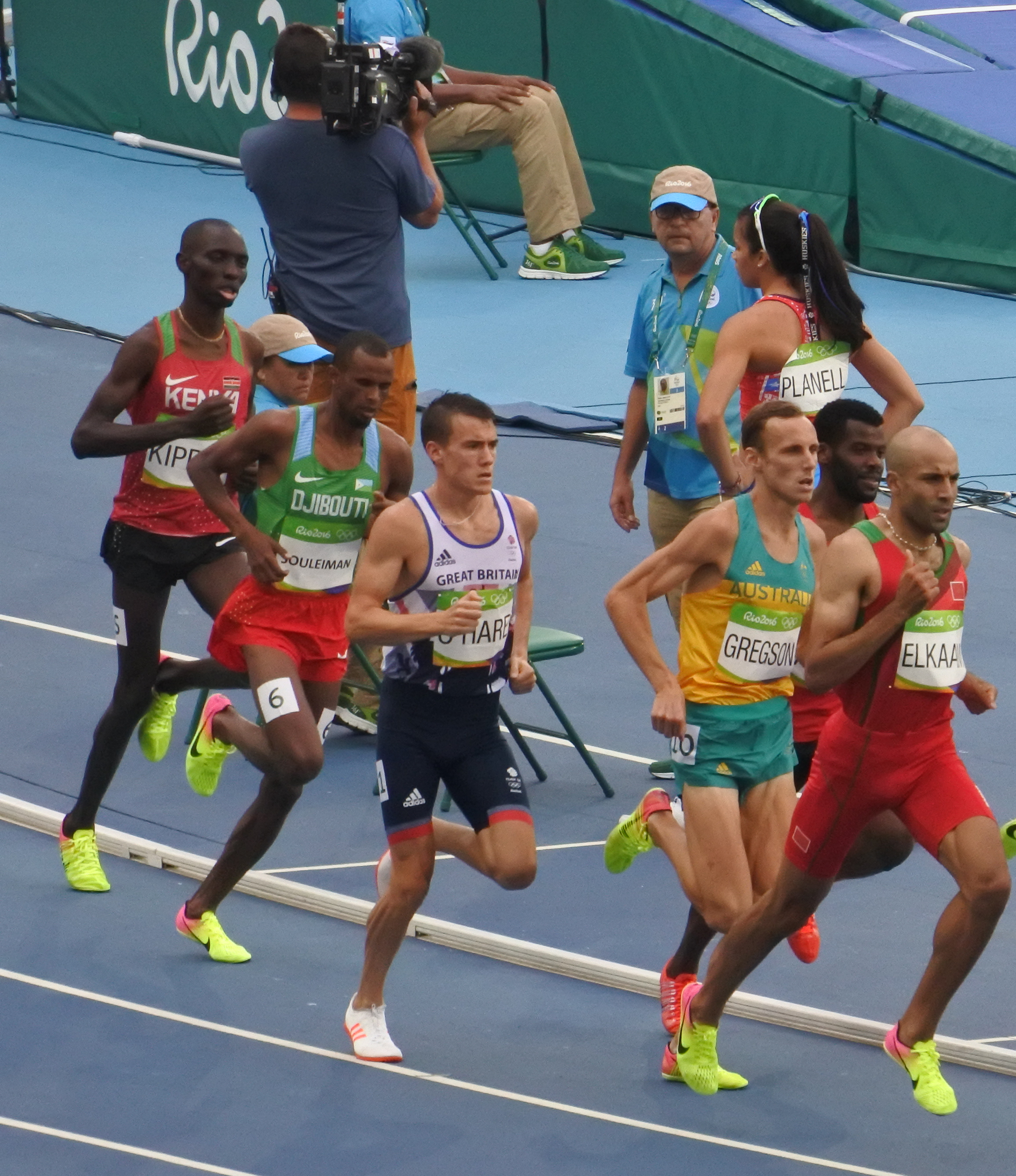
Souleiman during the 1500 m in Rio.

Ayanleh Souleiman qualified for the 800 m race by having a qualifying time better than 1:46.00. He placed first in his heat for the 800 m with a time of 1:45.48, which qualified him for the semifinal round along with three other runners in his heat. There were seven heats in the first round. Hassan Mohamed Kamil, Secretary of State for Youth and Sports, congratulated him saying, "May God give him the strength to win the next competitions and always raise the national colors." Souleiman finished with a better time in the semifinal round with a time of 1:45.19, but placed fourth in the heat and did not qualify for the final round. He would have needed to beat Ferguson Cheruiyot Rotich's time of 1:44.65 to qualify for the final round.

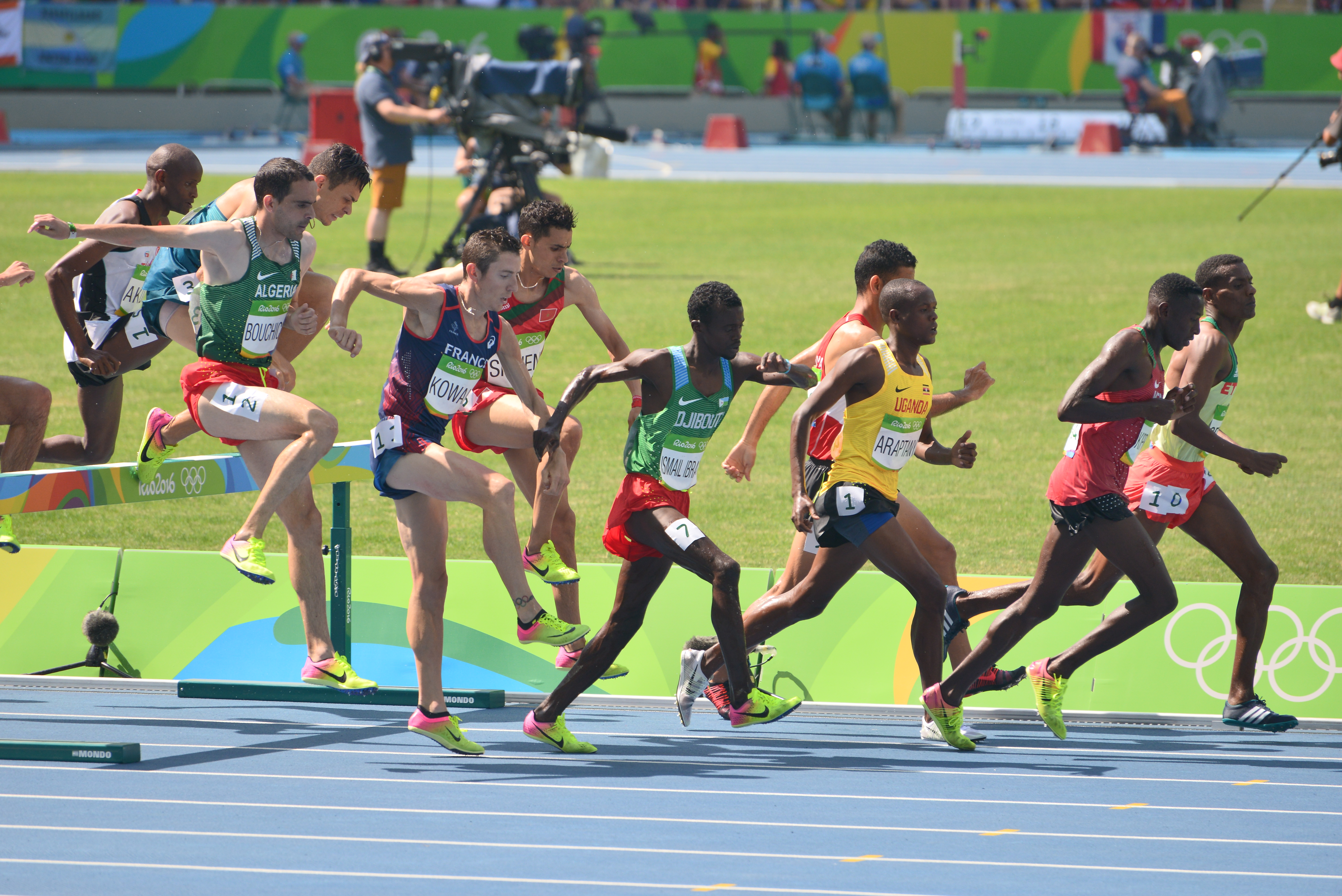
Ismail Ibrahim competing in the 3000 m steeplechase in Rio.

Djibouti had two athletes qualify for the 1500 m run with a qualification time better than 3:36.20. Ayanleh Souleiman finished third in the first heat with a time 3:39.25, which qualified him for the semifinals. He finished in 2nd place in that heat with a time of 3:39.46, which qualified him for the finals. In the finals, Souleiman finished in fourth place with a time of 3:50.29. He was 0.05 seconds away from the bronze medal, and 0.29 seconds away from the gold. The other Djiboutian that qualified for the 1500 m run, Abdi Waiss Mouhyadin, did not finish the race. On the final lap, he tripped and required help to leave the track. Waiss was also the flagbearer for Djibouti in the opening ceremony.

Mohamed Ismail Ibrahim qualified for the 3000 m steeplechase by performing better than the qualification time of 8:30.00. He finished with a time of 8:53.10 for 12th place in his heat. He would have needed a time of 8:26.59 or better to advance to the finals, and was therefore eliminated. Ibrahim was the closing ceremony flag bearer for Djibouti.

Mumin Gala, the only returning Olympian for Djibouti, qualified for the marathon with a time better than 2:19:00. Gala set his personal record at Rio with a time of 2:13:04 and finished in 12th place out of 155 participants.

Kadra Mohamed Dembil was the sole woman athlete for Djibouti in Rio. She qualified for the 1500 m via a universality placement. Dembil finished 12th out of 14 in her heat, failing to advance to the next round. With her time of 4:42.67, she set a national record.

Key

- Note–Ranks given for track events are within the athlete's heat only
- Q = Qualified for the next round
- q = Qualified for the next round as a fastest loser or, in field events, by position without achieving the qualifying target
- NR = National record
- N/A = Round not applicable for the event
- Bye = Athlete not required to compete in round

Track & road events

Athlete	Event	Heat		Semifinal		Final	
Athlete	Event	Result	Rank	Result	Rank	Result	Rank
Ayanleh Souleiman	Men's 800 m	1:45.48	1 Q	1:45.19	4	Did not advance	
Abdi Waiss Mouhyadin	Men's 1500 m	DNF		Did not advance			
Ayanleh Souleiman	Men's 1500 m	3:39.25	3 Q	3:39.46	2 Q	3:50.29	4
Mohamed Ismail Ibrahim	Men's 3000 m steeplechase	8:53.10	12	—		Did not advance	
Mumin Gala	Men's marathon	—				2:13:04	12
Kadra Mohamed Dembil	Women's 1500 m	4:42.67	12	Did not advance			

== Judo ==
Anass Houssein qualified for the Men's −66 kg via a wildcard spot. He competed on August 7 at the Carioca Arena 2. Houssein started in the second round against Ma Duanbin of the People's Republic of China, but lost the first match which eliminated him from contention.

Athlete	Event	Round of 64	Round of 32	Round of 16	Quarterfinals	Semifinals	Repechage	Final / BM	
Athlete	Event	Opposition Result	Opposition Result	Opposition Result	Opposition Result	Opposition Result	Opposition Result	Opposition Result	Rank
Anass Houssein	Men's −66 kg	Bye	Ma Db (CHN); L 000–110	Did not advance					

== Swimming ==
Djibouti received a universality invitation from FINA to send a male swimmer to the Olympics. Bourhan Abro, a son of diplomat Ahmed Abro, competed in the men's 50 m freestyle at the Olympic Aquatics Stadium. He has competed for Djibouti in swimming at other international competitions. Abro arrived at Rio later than the rest of the delegation and joined them there. Abro competed in the second heat and finished with a time of 27.13, placing 74th among 85 competitors. He needed a time of 22.10 to advance to the semifinals.

Athlete	Event	Heat		Semifinal		Final	
Athlete	Event	Time	Rank	Time	Rank	Time	Rank
Bourhan Abro	Men's 50 m freestyle	27.13	74	Did not advance			
