= Djibouti at the 1992 Summer Olympics =

- IOC code: DJI
- NOC: Comité National Olympique Djiboutien

in Barcelona
- Competitors: 8 in 3 sports
- Medals: Gold 0 Silver 0 Bronze 0 Total 0

Summer Olympics appearances (overview)
- 1984; 1988; 1992; 1996; 2000; 2004; 2008; 2012; 2016; 2020; 2024

Djibouti took part in the 1992 Summer Olympics, which were held in Barcelona, Spain from 25 July to 9 August. The country's participation marked its fourth appearance in the Summer Olympics since its debut at the 1984 Summer Games in Los Angeles, United States. The delegation from Djibouti included eight athletes, five in athletics, two in judo and one in sailing. Houssein Djama, Moussa Souleiman, Omar Daher Gadid, Ahmed Salah, and Talal Omar Abdillahi represented the nation in athletics, while Youssef Omar Isahak, Alaoui Mohamed Taher represented the nation in judo. Robleh Ali Adou represented Djibouti in sailing.

== Background ==
Djibouti participated in three Summer Olympics between its debut at the 1984 Games in Los Angeles, United States and the 1992 Summer Olympics in Barcelona, Spain. Djibouti made their Olympic debut in 1984, sending three athletes. Djibouti's one and only medal prior to these games was a bronze awarded to Hussein Ahmed Salah in the men's marathon at the 1988 Summer Olympics in Seoul, South Korea. The 1992 Summer Olympics marked a record in the number of athletes that Djibouti has sent to the Summer Olympics.

== Competitors ==
The following is the list of number of competitors in the Games.

| Sport | Men | Women | Total |
|---|---|---|---|
| Athletics | 5 | 0 | 5 |
| Judo | 2 | 0 | 2 |
| Sailing | 1 | 0 | 1 |
| Total | 8 | 0 | 8 |

== Athletics ==
Djibouti was represented by five male athletes at the 1992 Summer Olympics in athletics: Houssein Djama, Moussa Souleiman, Omar Daher Gadid, Ahmed Salah, and Talal Omar Abdillahi. This was the first olympic appearance for Houssein Djama, Omar Daher Gadid, Moussa Souleiman. This was the second Olympic appearance for Talal Omar Abdillahi and the third for Ahmed Salah.

Houssein Dajam competed in the men's 1500 meters, where he finished seventh out of the eleven athletes in his heat, failing to advance to the next round. The medals in the event went to athletes from Spain, Morocco, and Qatar.

Moussa Souleiman competed in the men's 5000 meters, where he finished thirteenth out of the fourteen athletes in his heat, failing to advance to the next round. The medals in the event went to athletes from Germany, Kenya, and Ethiopia.

Omar Daher Gadid competed in the men's 10000, where he finished twenty-fifth out of the twenty-eight athletes in his heat, failing to advance to the next round. The medals in the event went to athletes from Morocco, Kenya, and Ethiopia.

Both Ahmed Salah and Talal Omar Abdillahi both competed in the men's marathon. Salah completed the marathon in two hours, nineteen minutes and four seconds, finishing thirtieth, while Abdillahi was one of twenty-three athletes that did not finish the marathon. The medals in the event went to athletes from South Korea, Japan, and Germany.

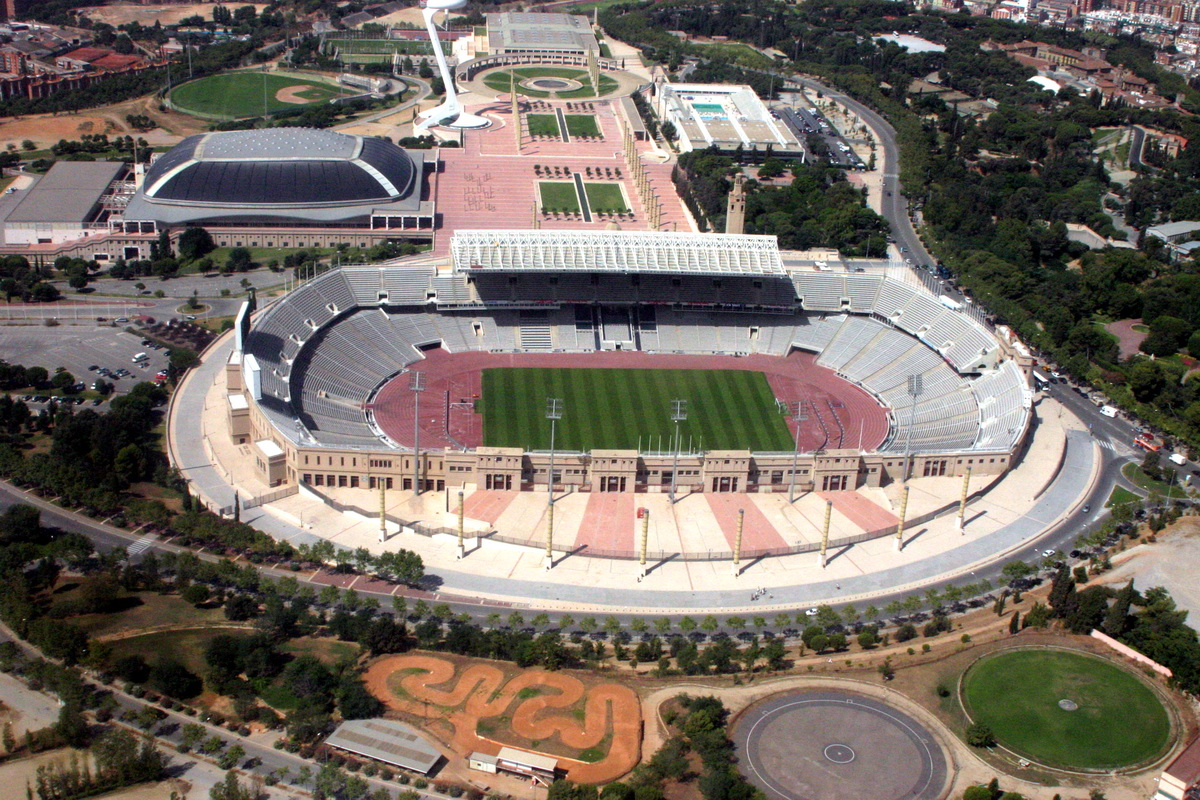
Anella Olímpica where the track and road events were held at the 1992 Summer Olympics

=== Men ===
==== Track & road events ====
| Athlete | Event | Heat | | Semifinal | | Final | |
| Athlete | Event | Result | Rank | Result | Rank | Result | Rank |
|---|---|---|---|---|---|---|---|
| Houssein Djama | 1500 m | 3:44.13 | 7 | did not advance | | | |
| Moussa Souleiman | 5000 m | 14:28.77 | 13 | —N/a | | did not advance | |
| Omar Daher Gadid | 10000 m | 30:32.89 | 25 | —N/a | | did not advance | |
| Ahmed Salah | marathon | —N/a | | | | 2:19:04 | 30 |
| Talal Omar Abdillahi | marathon | —N/a | | | | did not finish | |

== Judo ==
Djibouti was represented by two male athletes at the 1992 Summer Olympics in Judo: Youssef Omar Isahak and Alaoui Mohamed Taher. This was the first olympic appearance for both Isahak and Taher. These were the first Olympic Games in which Djibouti participated in Judo.

Youssef Omar Isahak competed in the men's extra-lightweight division, he was one of twelve athletes eliminated in tier twenty-three. The medals in the event went to athletes from the Unified Team, South Korea, Japan and Germany.

Alaoui Mohamed Taher competed in the men's lightweight division, he was one of twelve athletes eliminated in tier twenty-two. The medals in the event went to athletes from Japan, Hungary, Korea, and Israel.

=== Men ===
| Athlete | Event | Round of 64 | Round of 32 | Round of 16 | Repechage | Quarterfinals | Semifinals | Final / BM | |
| Athlete | Event | Opposition Result | Opposition Result | Opposition Result | Opposition Result | Opposition Result | Opposition Result | Opposition Result | Rank |
|---|---|---|---|---|---|---|---|---|---|
| Youssef Omar Isahak | −60 kg | Bye | Kamrowski (POL); L | did not advance | | | | | T-23 |
| Alaoui Mohamed Taher | -71 kg | Bye | Oren Smadja (ISR); L | did not advance | | | | | T-22 |

== Sailing ==
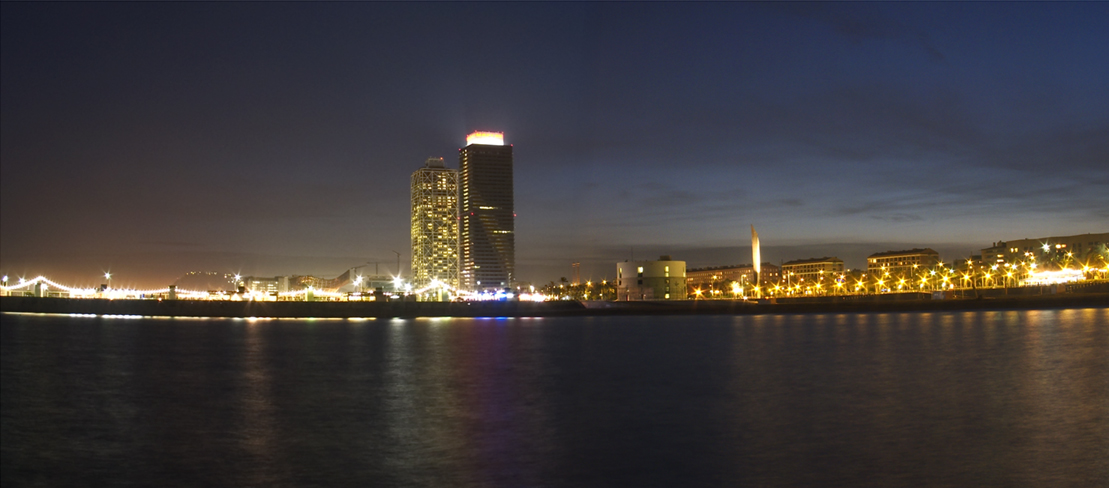
Port Olímpic where the sailing events for the 1992 Summer Olympics were held

Djibouti was represented by one male athlete at the 1992 Summer Olympics in sailing: Robleh Ali Adou. This was the second appearance at the Summer Games for Adou, who had previously competed in the 1988 Summer Olympics.

Robleh Ali Adou competed in the mixed Lechner A-390 event. Adou finished in the standings at thirty-ninth of forty-three athletes. He scored a total of 429 points with a net point value of 376. The medals in this event went to athletes from France, United States and Australia.

=== Mixed ===
| Rank | Helmsman (Country) | Event | Race I | | Race II | | Race III | | Race IV | | Race V | | Race VI | | Race VII | | Race VIII | | Race IX | | Race X | | Score | Rank |
| Rank | Helmsman (Country) | Event | Rank | Points | Rank | Points | Rank | Points | Rank | Points | Rank | Points | Rank | Points | Rank | Points | Rank | Points | Rank | Points | Rank | Points | Score | Rank |
|---|---|---|---|---|---|---|---|---|---|---|---|---|---|---|---|---|---|---|---|---|---|---|---|---|
| 39 | Robleh Ali Adou | Lechner A-390 | 32 | 38.0 | 40 | 46.0 | 38 | 44.0 | ~~PMS~~ | ~~51.0~~ | 30 | 36.0 | 37 | 43.0 | 35 | 41.0 | 39 | 45.0 | 40 | 46.0 | 33 | 39.0 | 378.0 | 39 |

Key

PMS = Premature Start

~~Text~~ = Lowest score discarded
