= Djibouti at the 2024 Summer Olympics =

- IOC code: DJI
- NOC: Comité National Olympique Djiboutien

in Paris, France 26 July 2024 – 11 August 2024
- Competitors: 7 (5 men and 2 women) in 3 sports
- Flag bearers (opening): Mohamed Ismail Ibrahim & Samiyah Hassan Nour
- Flag bearer (closing): Bouh Ibrahim
- Medals: Gold 0 Silver 0 Bronze 0 Total 0

Summer Olympics appearances (overview)
- 1984; 1988; 1992; 1996; 2000; 2004; 2008; 2012; 2016; 2020; 2024

Djibouti competed at the 2024 Summer Olympics in Paris from 26 July to 11 August 2024. It was the nation's tenth appearance at the Summer Olympics. Djibouti did not field any athletes at the 2004 Summer Olympics in Athens.

Seven athletes were selected to the team, competing in athletics, judo, and swimming. Track runners Mohamed Ismail Ibrahim and Samiyah Hassan Nour was the nation's flag bearer at the opening ceremonies, while Bouh Ibrahim was the flag bearer for the closing ceremonies. Djibouti failed to win an Olympic medal at these Games, and have not won a medal since the 1988 Summer Olympics in Seoul.

== Background ==
The Djibouti National Olympic and Sports Committee was formed in 1983, and was recognised by the International Olympic Committee the following year. Djibouti’s Olympic journey began at the 1984 Summer Olympics in Los Angeles, United States, where the nation sent three marathon runners. The country reached its competitive peak early in its history when Hussein Ahmed Salah secured a bronze medal in the men’s marathon at the 1988 Seoul Olympics, which as of the 2024 Summer Olympics, remains the nation's only Olympic medal. The highest number of Djiboutian athletes participating at any single Summer Games was eight at the 1992 Games in Barcelona, Spain.

Since its 1984 debut, Djibouti has participated at every Summer Olympic Games, with one notable exception: the nation did not participate in the 2004 Summer Olympics in Athens, Greece. While the National Olympic Committee had initially entered four athletes, two in athletics and two in tennis, none of them appeared at the starting line. The reason for this sudden withdrawal remains officially unknown. Although the athletes were registered and even participated in the Opening Ceremony, they did not compete in their respective events, leading to 2004 being recorded as a non-participatory year for the nation.

After a strategic analysis of the performance of the country in the Tokyo 2020 Games, the Djiboutian government and the NOC adopted a new "Elite Sports" strategic plan. This included a special grant of 100 million Djiboutian francs (equivalent to about 560,000 USD) and the issuance of so-called service passports to athletes and their coaching staff to enable them to travel internationally to high-level training facilities in Kenya, Ethiopia, and France.

== Athletics ==
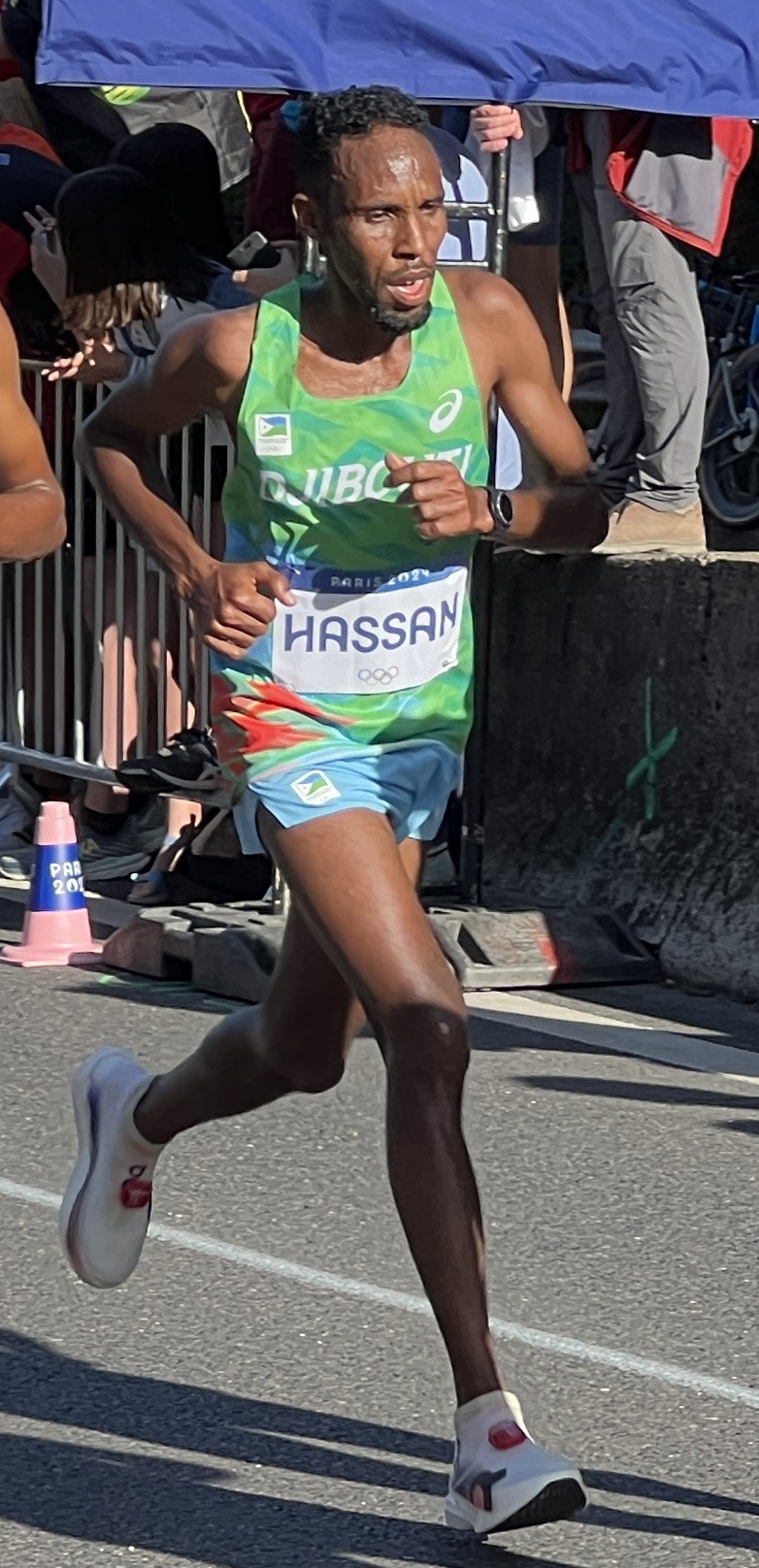
Bouh Ibrahim competing at the men's marathon.

Djiboutian track and field athletes achieved the entry standards for Paris 2024, either by passing the direct qualifying mark (or time for track and road races) or by world ranking, in the following events (a maximum of 3 athletes each). Djibouti sent four athletes to the 2024 Olympics: Mohamed Ismail Ibrahim and Abdi Waiss Mouhyadin competed in the men's 5000 m, while Bouh Ibrahim competed in the men's marathon. Djibouti also had one female athlete, Samiyah Hassan Nour compete in the women's 5000 m.

Mohamed Ismail Ibrahim served as one of the nation's flag bearers during the opening ceremony. Ibrahim previously competed in the 3000 m steeplechase at the 2016 Rio Olympics. Leading up to Paris, he set three national records in a span of a month in 2024: 3000 m (7:36.29) on 2 June 2024 at the 2024 BAUHAUS-galan and the 5000 m (12:56.43) on 15 May 2024 at the Spåret 5000m, both in Stockholm, Sweden. At the Night of the 10,000m PBs held in London, Great Britain on 18 May 2024, he achieved a time of 27:22.38 in the 10000 m. Like Ibrahim, this was the second Olympic Game for middle-distance runner Abdi Waiss Mouhyadin, who had previously competed in the men's 1500 m at the 2016 Rio Olympics. For the 2024 cycle, Waiss moved up in distance, qualifying for the 5000 m with a personal best of 13:02.38 set in Bordeaux, France.

Both Ibrahim and Waiss competed in the men's 5000 m at the 2024 games. Ibrahim was drawn in heat two in round one which took place on 7 August 2024. He finished 15th in his heat with a time of 13 minutes and 57.47 seconds directly behind Santiago Catrofe of Uruguay, out of 19 athletes that finished the race. (Note: One athlete, Adel Mechaal, did not start.) The leaders of Ibrahim's heat were eventual gold medalist Norway's Jakob Ingebrigtsen (13 minutes 51.59 seconds), Ethiopia's Biniam Mehary (13 minutes 51.82 seconds) and Belgium's Isaac Kimeli (13 minutes 52.18 seconds). Waiss was drawn in heat one and finished 11th out of 19 athletes that finished, directly behind Egide Ntakarutimana of Burundi. (Note: One athlete, Thierry Ndikumwenayo, did not finish. One athlete, Andreas Almgren, did not start.) His heat was led by Norway's Narve Gilje Nordås (14 minutes 08.16 seconds), Ethiopia's Hagos Gebrhiwet (14 minutes 08.18 seconds) and Belgium's John Heymans (14 minutes 08.33 seconds). Overall, Souleiman and Waiss placed 15th and 29th, respectively, out of the 39 athletes who participated in round one. Both of them did not advance to the final round of the competition.

Ibrahim Hassan (also known as Bouh Ibrahim) was the most successful Djiboutian athlete in the Paris delegation. Hassan gained international prominence by winning the 2023 Beppu-Ōita Marathon in a course-record time of 2:06:43. In the Olympic marathon, he finished 14th out of 81 competitors with a time of 2 hours 09 minutes and 31 seconds. The event was won by Tamirat Tola of Ethiopia. He was also the flag bearer for the closing ceremony.

Samiyah Hassan Nour made her Olympic debut as Djibouti's top female distance runner. She entered the Games as a continental medalist, having won bronze in the 5000 m at the 2024 African Championships in Douala, Cameroon. Nour holds the national records for the 5000 m (14:45.93) and 10000 m (32:17.72). In the Paris 5000 m event that took place on 2 August 2024, she was drawn in heat two, and finished 15th with a time of 15 minutes 13.63 seconds directly behind Parul Chaudhary of India who finished 3 seconds ahead. Overall, she finished 25th out of 40 athletes that competed.

Key

- Note–Ranks given for track events are within the athlete's heat only
- Q = Qualified for the next round
- q = Qualified for the next round as a fastest loser or, in field events, by position without achieving the qualifying target
- NR = National record
- N/A = Round not applicable for the event
- Bye = Athlete not required to compete in round

Track & road events
Men

Athlete	Event	Heat		Final	
Athlete	Event	Result	Rank	Result	Rank
Mohamed Ismail Ibrahim	Men's 5000 m	13:57.47	15	Did not advance	
Abdi Waiss Mouhyadin	Men's 5000 m	14:11.88	11	Did not advance	
Bouh Ibrahim	Men's marathon	—N/a		2:09:31 SB	14
Samiyah Hassan Nour	Women's 5000 m	15:13.63	15	Did not advance	

== Judo ==
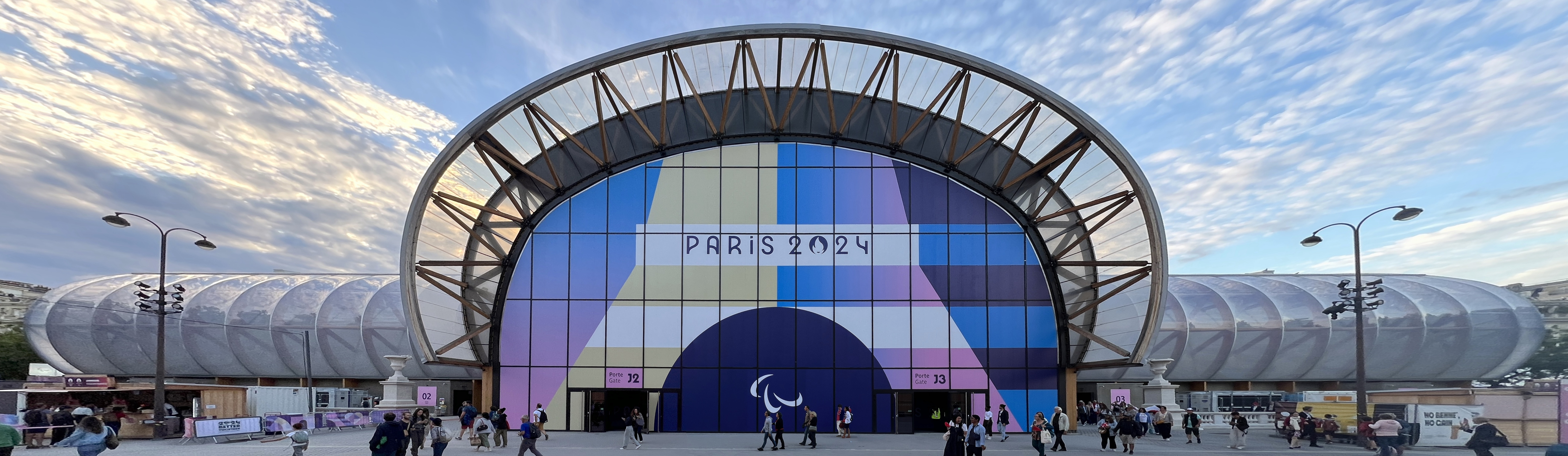
The Grand Palais Éphémère, where the judo events took place.

Djibouti qualified one judoka for the men's lightweight category (73 kg) at the Games. Aden-Alexandre Houssein qualified via continental quota based on Olympic point rankings. This marked his second appearance at the Summer Olympics, having previously competed in the same category at the 2020 Tokyo Olympic where he made it until the round of 16. His brother, Anass Houssein competed in the men's half-lightweight for Djibouti at the 2016 Summer Olympics. While he is primarily based in Paris, where he trains at the Montreuil club, during his two-year lead up to the 2024 Olympics he spent six months training in Hungary and subsequently spent five months in Japan. Houssein competed in the men's lightweight competition, held on 29 July. He lost the first round to Bulgaria's Mark Hristov in a match that lasted 3 minutes 12 seconds. He lost the match due to non-combativity and receiving a score of shido. As a result, he did not advance to later rounds. He is recorded as finishing a joint 17th place.

Athlete	Event	Round of 32	Round of 16	Quarterfinals	Semifinals	Repechage	Final / BM	
Athlete	Event	Opposition Result	Opposition Result	Opposition Result	Opposition Result	Opposition Result	Opposition Result	Rank
Aden-Alexandre Houssein	Men's –73 kg	Hristov (BUL); L 10–00	Did not advance					

== Swimming ==
The Paris La Défense Arena, where the aquatic events took place.

Djibouti received two universality quotas from World Aquatics, to send a top-ranked male and female swimmer in their respective individual events to the Olympics, based on the World Aquatics Point Table of 1 January 2024.

Houmed Houssein Barkat qualified for the universality slot from World Aquatics as his best time of 25.80 seconds was not within the Olympic Selection Time (OST) of 22.07 seconds. Prior to the Games, he competed at the 2023 African Games, swimming in the men's 100 backstroke event where he finished with a time of 1 minute and 12.17 seconds, setting a national record. Houmed was drawn in the fourth heat of the men's 50 m freestyle which was held on 1 August, finishing in seventh place, 0.02 seconds ahead of Camil Doua from Mauritania with a time of 26.00 seconds. Overall, he finished 54th out of 73 swimmers who competed and did not advance to the next round. The medals from the event went to athletes from Australia, Great Britain and France.

Naima-Zahra Amison also qualified for the universality slot as her best time of 33.99 seconds was not within the Olympic Selection Time (OST) of 24.82 seconds. She made her Olympic debut in the women's 50 m freestyle event on 3 August. She was drawn in heat one, where she finished third with a time of 33.69 second. No swimmer in her heat qualified for the semifinal round. Overall, she finished 74th out of 78 swimmers that competed in the first round. The medals from the event went to athletes from Sweden, Australia and China.

Athlete	Event	Heat		Semifinal		Final	
Athlete	Event	Time	Rank	Time	Rank	Time	Rank
Houmed Houssein Barkat	Men's 50 m freestyle	26.00	54	Did not advance			
Naima-Zahra Amison	Women's 50 m freestyle	33.65	75	Did not advance			
