= Djibouti at the 2000 Summer Olympics =

- IOC code: DJI
- NOC: Comité National Olympique Djiboutien

in Sydney
- Competitors: 2 (1 man and 1 woman) in 1 sport
- Flag bearer: Djama Robleh
- Medals: Gold 0 Silver 0 Bronze 0 Total 0

Summer Olympics appearances (overview)
- 1984; 1988; 1992; 1996; 2000; 2004; 2008; 2012; 2016; 2020; 2024

Djibouti took part in the 2000 Summer Olympics, which were held in Sydney, Australia from 15 September to 1 October. The country's participation at Sydney marked its fifth appearance in the Summer Olympics since its debut at the 1984 Summer Games in Los Angeles, United States. The delegation included two track and field athletes; Omar Daher Gadid in the men's marathon and Roda Ali Wais in the women's 800 metres. Gadid failed to finish the marathon, while Wais did not progress past the first round of her event.

== Background ==
Djibouti participated in four Summer Olympics between its debut at the 1984 Games in Los Angeles, United States, and the 2000 Summer Olympics in Sydney, Australia. Djibouti made their Olympic debut in 1984, sending three athletes. Djibouti's one and only medal prior to these games was a bronze awarded to Hussein Ahmed Salah in the men's marathon at the 1988 Summer Olympics in Seoul, South Korea. The highest number of Djibouti competing at a Games was eight at the 1992 Summer Olympics in Barcelona, Spain.

The Djibouti team for the 2000 Summer Olympics featured Omar Daher Gadid in the men's marathon, who had previously competed in the 10,000 metres at the 1992 Games.

== Competitors ==
The following is the list of number of competitors in the Games.

Sport	Men	Women	Total
Athletics	1	1	2
Total	1	1	2

== Athletics ==
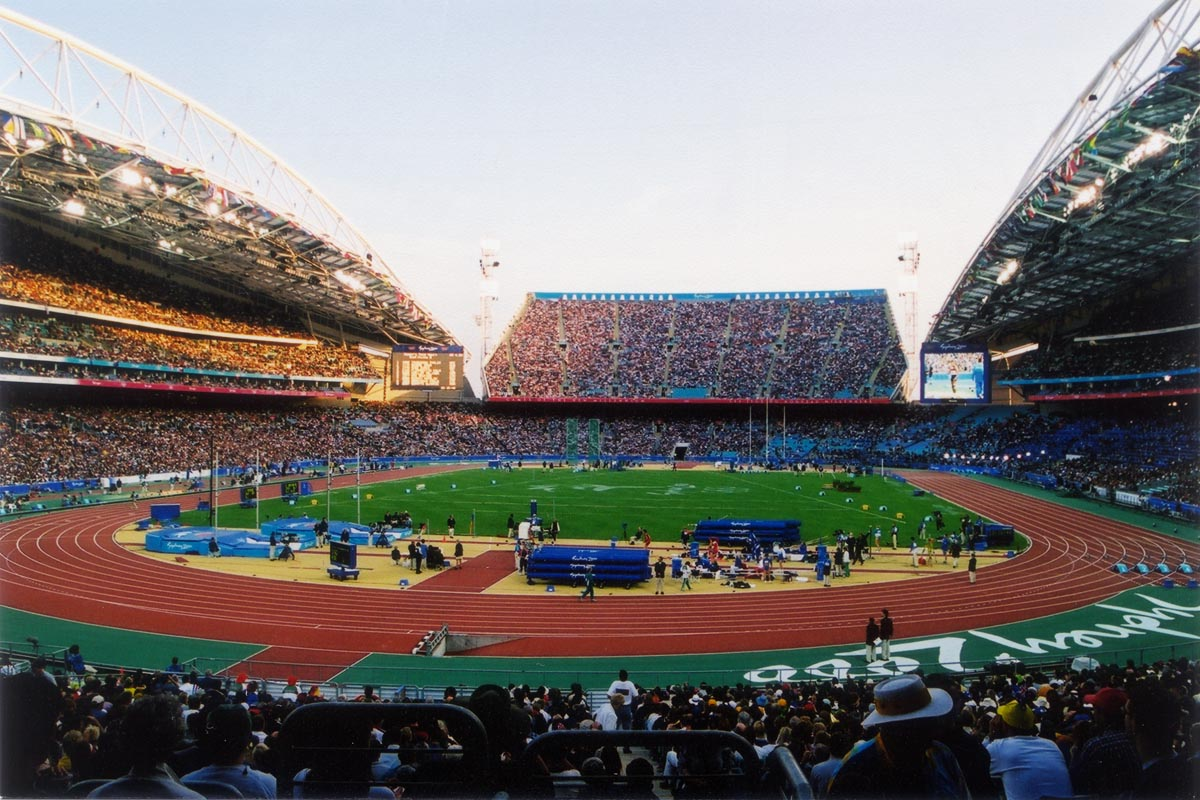
Sydney Olympic Park where Gadid and Wais competed

The sole female Djibouti athlete at the 2000 Games was Roda Ali Wais. She set a new record for her nation upon competing, being the youngest athlete to represent Djibouti, at the age of 16 years and 162 days. Wais was also the first female to represent Djibouti in the Olympic games. She competed in the second heat of the women's 800 metres on 22 September. Wais finished last in the heat of eight athletes, with a time of two minutes and 31.74 seconds. This was over 24 seconds adrift of Romania's Elena Iagăr (two minutes and 7.56 seconds). Only the top two athletes from the heat qualified, and Wais' competition ended with that heat.

Omar Daher Gadid was the only male athlete competing for Djibouti at the 2000 Summer Olympics, competed in the men's marathon on 1 October. In a field of 100 runners, 19 did not complete the race including Gadid. The medals were shared between athletes from African nations with the gold and bronze going to Ethiopia's Gezahgne Abera (two hours, ten minutes and 11 seconds) and Tesfaye Tola (two hours, 11 minutes and ten seconds) respectively, and the silver won by Eric Wainaina from Kenya (two hours, ten minutes and 31 seconds).

Key

- Note–Ranks given for track events are within the athlete's heat only
- N/A = Round not applicable for the event

=== Men ===
Athlete	Event	Heat		Semifinal		Final	
Athlete	Event	Result	Rank	Result	Rank	Result	Rank
Omar Daher Gadid	Men's marathon	N/A				Did not finish	

=== Women ===
Athlete	Event	Heat		Semifinal		Final	
Athlete	Event	Result	Rank	Result	Rank	Result	Rank
Roda Ali Wais	Women's 800 metres	2:31.71	8	Did not advance			
