= Djibouti at the 2012 Summer Olympics =

- IOC code: DJI
- NOC: Comité National Olympique Djiboutien

in London
- Competitors: 5 in 4 sports
- Flag bearer (opening): Zourah Ali
- Flag bearer (closing): Yasmin Farah
- Medals: Gold 0 Silver 0 Bronze 0 Total 0

Summer Olympics appearances (overview)
- 1984; 1988; 1992; 1996; 2000; 2004; 2008; 2012; 2016; 2020; 2024

Djibouti competed at the 2012 Summer Olympics in London, from July 27 to August 12, 2012. This was the nation's seventh appearance at the Olympics.

Five athletes were selected to the team, competing in athletics, judo, swimming, and table tennis. This was the first Olympics that Djibouti participated in swimming and table tennis. Track runner Zourah Ali was the nation's flag bearer at the opening ceremonies, while table tennis player Yasmin Farah was the flag bearer for the closing ceremonies. Djibouti failed to win an Olympic medal at these Games, and have not won a medal since the 1988 Summer Olympics in Seoul.

== Background ==
Djibouti debuted at the 1984 Olympic Games, fielding three marathon runners. Djibouti's one and only medal prior to these Games was a bronze awarded to Hussein Ahmed Salah for the marathon in at the 1988 Seoul Olympic Games. The first female athlete for Djibouti, Roda Ali Wais, debuted at the 2000 Sydney Olympic Games.

== Athletics ==
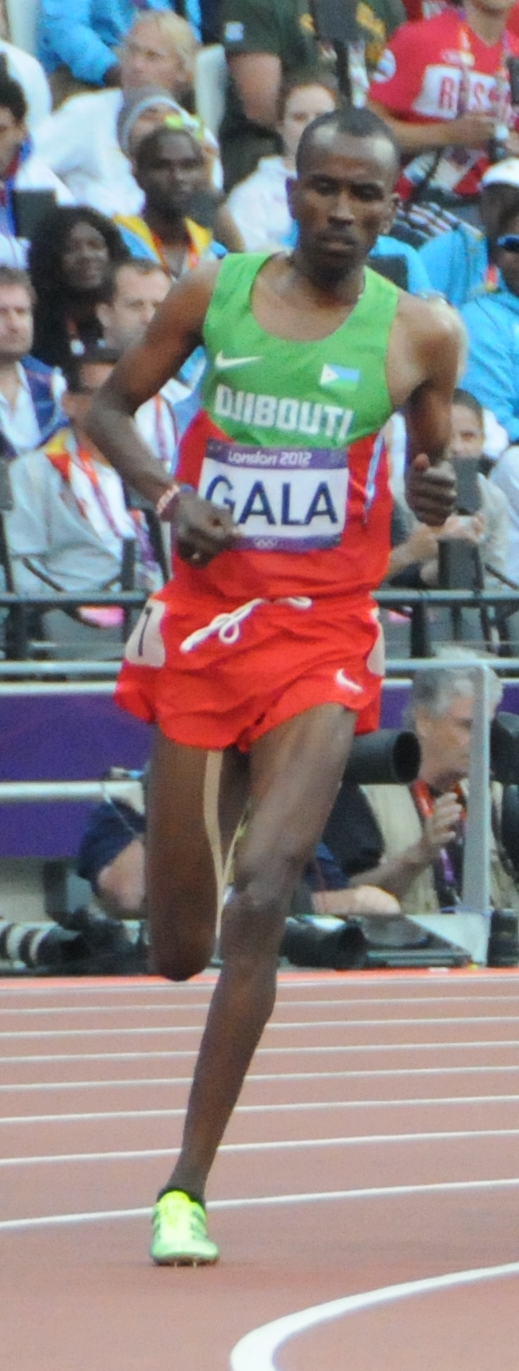
Mumin Gala competing in the 5000m run.

Djibouti had two athletes qualify for athletics at this Olympics, one male and one female. Mumin Gala qualified for the 5000 metre run and Zourah Ali qualified for the 400 metre run.

Djibouti's National Olympic Committee (NOC) selected two athletes that met the qualification standards. A NOC can to enter up to three qualified athletes in each individual event as long as each athlete met the "A" standard, or one athlete per event if they met the "B" standard. Mumin was qualified via the A standard. If no athletes meet the qualification standard, a country is permitted to enter their best male and best female athlete in one event each, which is how Zourah was qualified.

Gala finished the first heat with a time of 13:21.21, finishing 10th. Although the first five from each heat move on to the finals, the next five fastest times are also qualified, and Gala was fifth on that list. Gala was close to his personal record of 13:17.77 in the first heat, but he finished the final with a time of 13:50.26 and placed 13th overall, out of a field of 43 athletes.

Zourah competed in the 400 metre race, which she completed in 1:05.37 minutes. She did not place high enough in her heat to be qualified for the semifinals, as she finished in 44th place and with the second slowest time in that race.

Key

- Note–Ranks given for track events are within the athlete's heat only
- Q = Qualified for the next round
- q = Qualified for the next round as a fastest loser or, in field events, by position without achieving the qualifying target
- Bye = Athlete not required to compete in round

Men

Athlete	Event	Heat		Final	
Athlete	Event	Result	Rank	Result	Rank
Mumin Gala	5000 m	13:21.21	10 q	13:50.26	13

Women

Athlete	Event	Heat		Semifinal		Final	
Athlete	Event	Result	Rank	Result	Rank	Result	Rank
Zourah Ali	400 m	1:05.37	7	Did not advance			

== Judo ==
Djibouti had 1 judoka invited, who competed in the second round after a first round bye. She lost this match to Căprioriu and finished 9th overall in the tournament.

Athlete	Event	Round of 32	Round of 16	Quarterfinals	Semifinals	Repechage	Final / BM	
Athlete	Event	Opposition Result	Opposition Result	Opposition Result	Opposition Result	Opposition Result	Opposition Result	Rank
Sally Raguib	Women's −57 kg	Bye	Căprioriu (ROU); L 0000–0100	Did not advance				

== Swimming ==
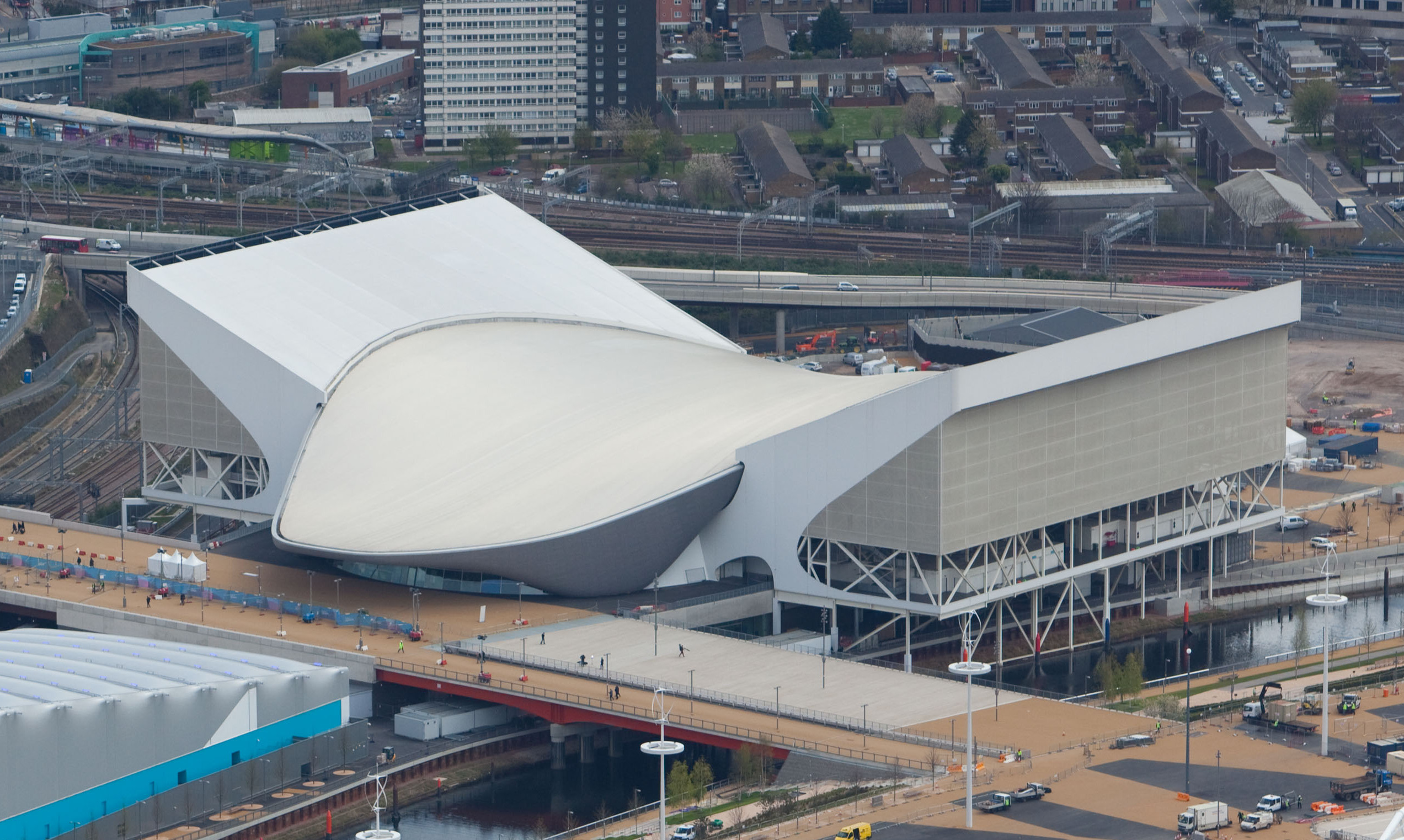
The London Aquatics Centre, where the swimming events were held.

Osman gained a universality placement from the FINA, with a time of 27.69 seconds. At the Olympics, Osman placed first in his heat with a time of 27.25 seconds. He was 4.98 seconds away from qualifying for the next round, and finished 49th overall.

Men

Athlete	Event	Heat		Semifinal		Final	
Athlete	Event	Time	Rank	Time	Rank	Time	Rank
Abdourahman Osman	50 m freestyle	27.25	49	Did not advance			

== Table tennis ==
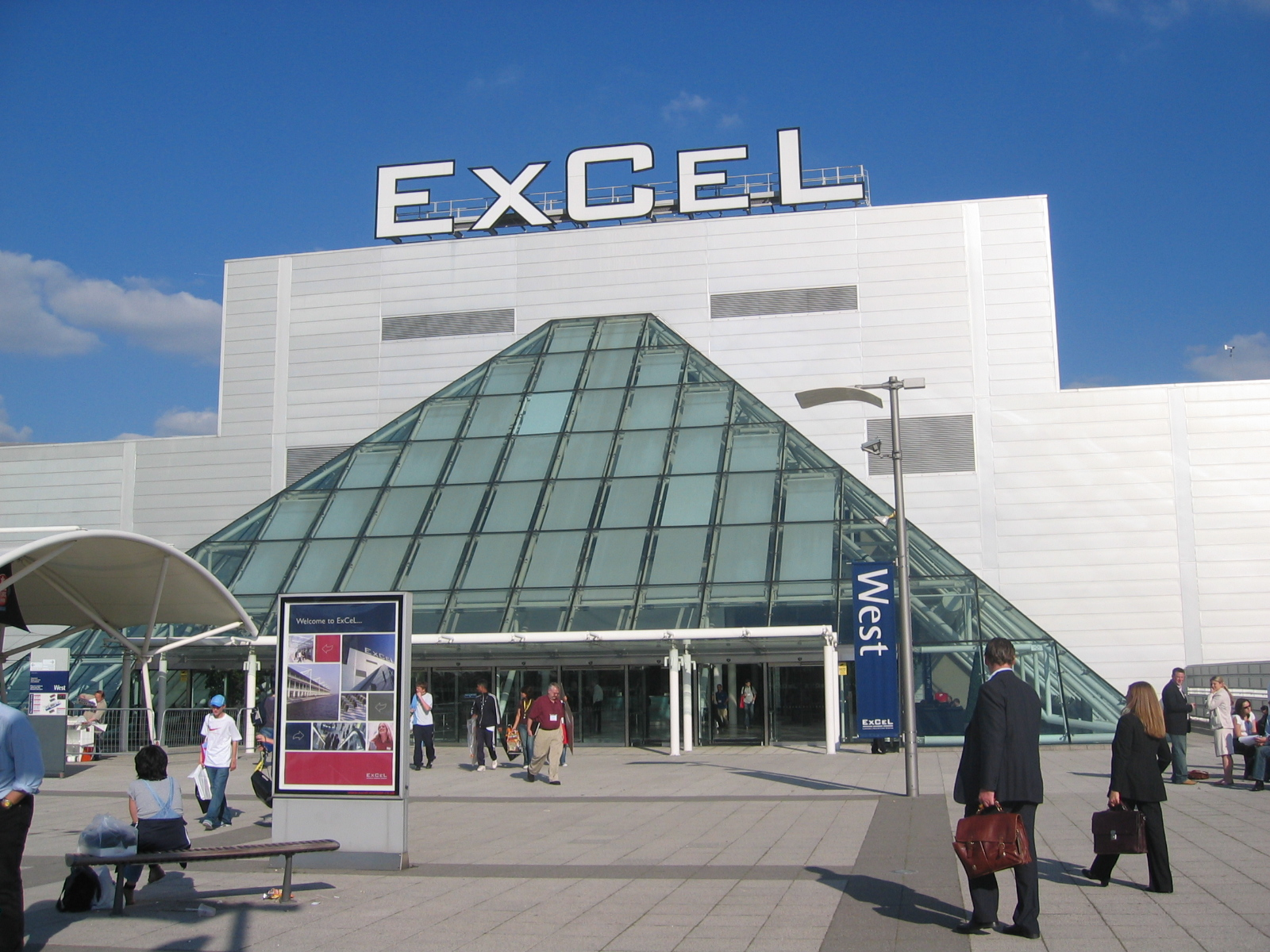
ExCeL Exhibition Center, where Yasmin Farah and Sally Raguib competed.

Yasmin Farah competed in women's singles at the age of 18. The event was held at ExCeL London. The top thirty-two seeds received byes, since Yasmin was seeded 70th her match was in the preliminary round, which she lost in four rounds, scoring 0, 2, 2, and 4 in the matches respectively.

Athlete	Event	Preliminary round	Round 1	Round 2	Round 3	Round 4	Quarterfinals	Semifinals	Final / BM	
Athlete	Event	Opposition Result	Opposition Result	Opposition Result	Opposition Result	Opposition Result	Opposition Result	Opposition Result	Opposition Result	Rank
Yasmin Farah	Women's singles	Kumahara (BRA); L 0–4	Did not advance							

== See also ==
- Djibouti at the 2012 Summer Paralympics
