= Djibouti at the 1984 Summer Olympics =

- IOC code: DJI
- NOC: Comité National Olympique Djiboutien

in Los Angeles
- Competitors: 3 (3 men and 0 women) in 1 sport
- Flag bearer: Djama Robleh
- Medals: Gold 0 Silver 0 Bronze 0 Total 0

Summer Olympics appearances (overview)
- 1984; 1988; 1992; 1996; 2000; 2004; 2008; 2012; 2016; 2020; 2024

Djibouti took part in the 1984 Summer Olympics, which were held in Los Angeles, United States from July 28 to August 12. The 1984 Summer Olympics were Djibouti's first Olympic appearance. The delegation included three marathon athletes, Djama Robleh, Ahmed Salah, and Omar Abdillahi Charmarke, none of whom won a medal.

== Background ==
Prior to competing in these Olympic Games, Djibouti had never participated in the Olympics. Djibouti gained independence from France in 1977, making 1980 the first Summer Olympics the country would be eligible for. Djibouti was one of 65 countries that boycotted the 1980 Moscow Olympics in protest of the Soviet war in Afghanistan.

Dajama Robleh, who participated in these Games, had won a silver medal in the 1982 African Championships in Athletics for the men's full marathon with a time of 2:31:06. Ahmed Salah had participated in both the 1983 World Championships in Athletics and the 1984 African Championships in Athletics prior to these Olympics. He did not finish the marathon in 1983, and he won a silver medal in the 1984 10,000 metres run with a time of 28:17.4.

== Athletics ==
All three of Djibouti's athletes that participated in the Olympics competed in the men's marathon. The marathon started at Santa Monica College and the finish line was on the track at the Los Angeles Memorial Coliseum.

Djama Robleh was the flagbearer for Djibouti. He completed the marathon in two hours, eleven minutes and thirty-nine seconds finishing in eighth place. Since this was Djibouti's first Olympics, Robleh set Djibouti's Olympic Record for the marathon. Robleh finished before two of the three marathoners who were considered the best at the time, Toshihiko Seko and Alberto Salazar.

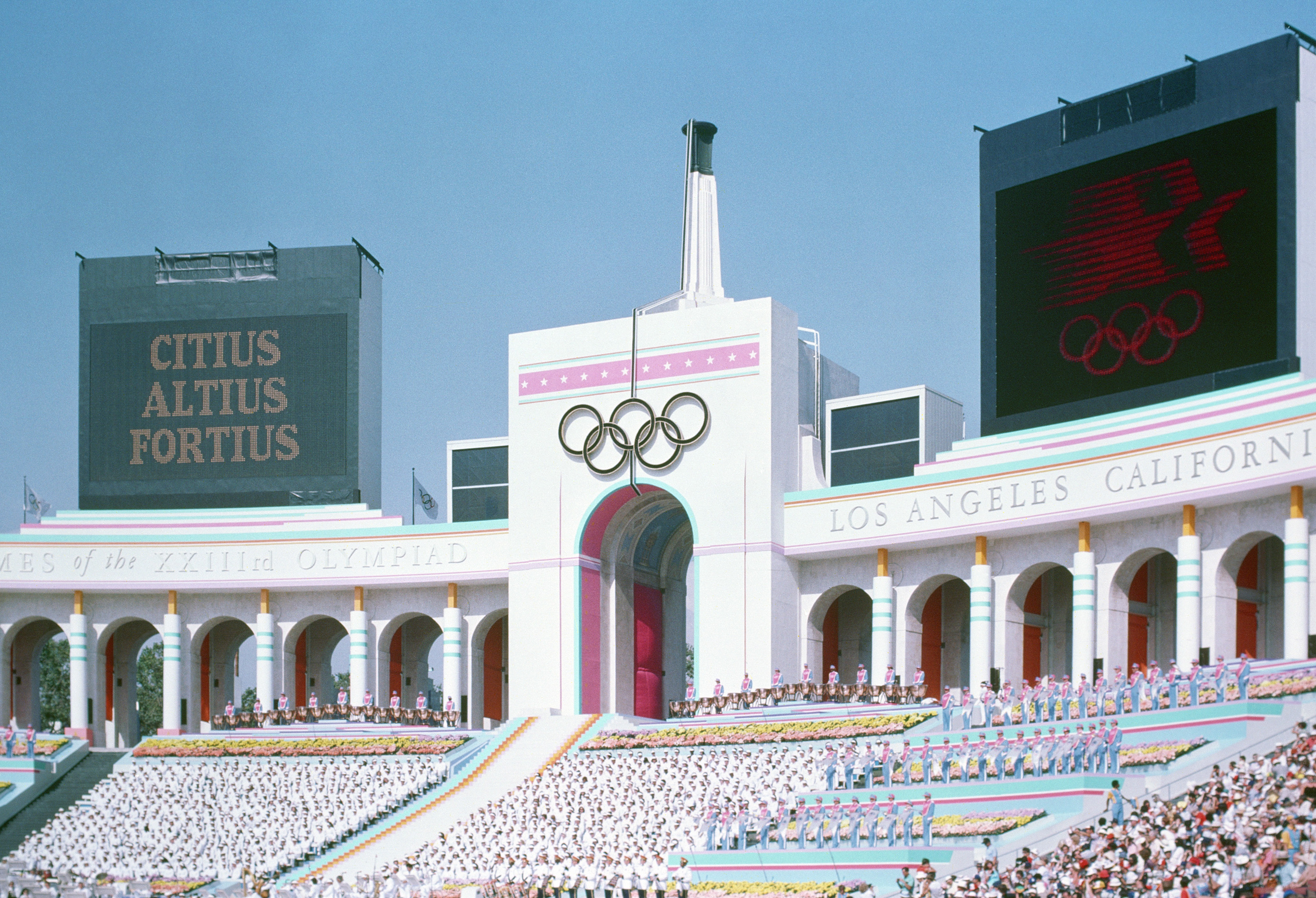
The opening ceremony at the 1984 Summer Olympics in Los Angeles, United States

In what was his sixth ever marathon, Ahmed Salah finished in 2:15:59 and achieved twentieth place. Salah won a bronze medal in the 1988 Olympics to become the only Djiboutian medalist in the Olympics. Omar Abdillahi Charmarke completed the marathon in two hours, nineteen minutes, and eleven seconds, finishing in thirty-second place. The medals in the event went to athletes from Portugal, Ireland, and Great Britain.

=== Men ===
Athlete	Event	Final	
Athlete	Event	Result	Rank
Djama Robleh	Marathon	2:11:39	8
Ahmed Salah	Marathon	2:15:59	20
Omar Abdillahi Charmarke	Marathon	2:19:11	32
