= Djibouti at the 2020 Summer Olympics =

- IOC code: DJI
- NOC: Comité National Olympique Djiboutien

in Tokyo, Japan 23 July 2021 – August 8, 2021
- Competitors: 4 in 3 sports
- Flag bearer (opening): Aden-Alexandre Houssein
- Flag bearer (closing): Souhra Ali Mohamed
- Medals: Gold 0 Silver 0 Bronze 0 Total 0

Summer Olympics appearances (overview)
- 1984; 1988; 1992; 1996; 2000; 2004; 2008; 2012; 2016; 2020; 2024

Djibouti competed at the 2020 Summer Olympics in Tokyo. Originally scheduled to take place from 24 July to 9 August 2020, the Games were postponed to 23 July to 8 August 2021, because of the COVID-19 pandemic. This was the nation's ninth appearance at the Summer Olympics; Djibouti did not field any athletes at the 2004 Summer Olympics in Athens. The delegation consisted of four athletes, three men and one woman, competing in five events across three sports. Two athletes participated in the judo and swimming tournaments: Aden-Alexandre Houssein and Houssein Gaber Ibrahim. Athlete Ayanleh Souleiman, a returning competitor from the 2016 Rio Olympics competed in the men's 800 metres and 1500 metres events. Souhra Ali Mohamed, who had previously participated in the 2012 Summer Olympics competed in the women's 1500 metres event. Houssein lead the Djiboutian squad as the flagbearer in the opening ceremony with Souhra being the flagbearer for the closing ceremony.

== Background ==
Djibouti, officially the Republic of Djibouti, is a country in the Horn of Africa. As of 2021 the country had a population of approximately 1,001,454. The country was formerly known as French Somaliland before gaining independence from France in 1977. The Djibouti National Olympic and Sports Committee was formed in 1983, and was recognised by the International Olympic Committee the following year. Djibouti has participated in every Summer Olympics since its debut in the 1984 Summer Olympics in Los Angeles except the 2004 Games. The highest number of Djiboutian athletes participating at any single Summer Games was eight at the 1992 Games in Barcelona, Spain.

The 2020 Summer Olympics were originally due to be held from 24 July to 9 August 2020, but were delayed to 23 July to 8 August 2021 due to the COVID-19 pandemic. For the 2020 Summer Olympics, Djibouti sent a delegation of four athletes. The Djiboutian team at the 2020 Games featured two track and field athletes, a judoka and a swimmer. Sprinter Ayanleh Souleiman participating in the men's 800 metres and 1500 metres was a returning athlete from the 2016 Summer Olympics in Rio de Janeiro, Brazil. Sprinter Souhra Ali Mohamed, who had previously represented Djibouti at the 2012 Summer Olympics in London, made her second appearance at the games in the women's 1500 metres event. She was the only female in the Djiboutian delegation. Judoka Aden-Alexandre Houssein and swimmer Houssein Gaber Ibrahim made their debut at the Olympics participating in the men's lightweight and men's 50 m freestyle events respectively. Houssein was chosen to be the flagbearers for Djibouti during the parade of nations of the opening ceremony with Souhra being the flagbearer for the closing ceremony.

== Athletics ==
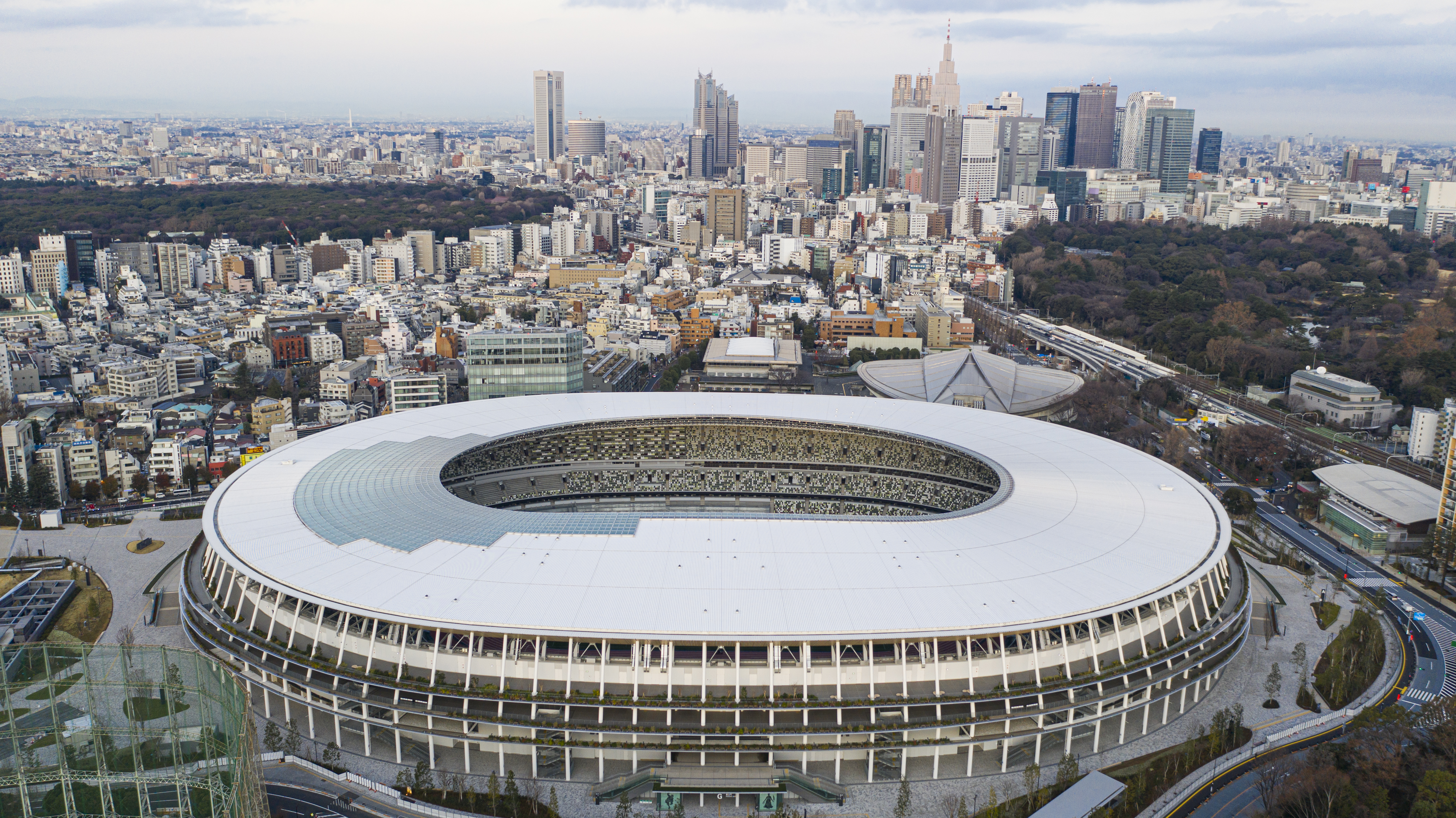
The Japan National Stadium, where the track and field events took place.

Djibouti athletes further achieved the entry standards, either by qualifying time or by world ranking, in the following track and field events (up to a maximum of 3 athletes in each event): Djibouti sent two athletes to the 2020 Olympics. Ayanleh Souleiman was set to compete in the men's 800 metres and men's 1500 metres while Souhra Ali Mohamed, the only women in the Djiboutian delegation competed in the women's 1500 metres.

Souleiman had been due to compete in the sixth heat of the men's 800 metres taking place on 31 July, however he did not start the race. In the men's 1500 metres event he was drawn in heat three in round one. Souleiman finished ninth in his heat out of 13 athletes that finished the race. (Note: Two athletes, Soufiane El Bakkali and Ronald Musagala, did not finish. One athlete, Yared Nuguse, did not start.) He qualified for the next round with a time of 3 minutes and 37.25 seconds, finishing directly behind Andrew Coscoran of Ireland (3 minutes 37.11 seconds) and ahead of Kenya's Charles Simotwo (3 minutes 37.26 seconds). The leaders of Souleiman's heat were Great Britain's Jake Heyward (3 minutes 36.14 seconds) and Ethiopia's Teddese Lemi (3 minutes 36.26 seconds). Overall, Souleiman placed 17th out of the 47 athletes who participated in the qualification round. (Note: One athlete, Yared Nuguse, did not start.) He advanced to semifinals, which took place on 5 August. During semifinals, Souleiman participated in the first heat, where he ran his event but was unable to finish the race . The heat's leaders were Great Britain's Jake Wightman (3 minutes 33.48 seconds), United States's Cole Hocker (3 minutes 33.87 seconds) and eventual silver medalist Timothy Cheruiyot of Kenya. Souleiman did not advance to finals.

At 26 years old, Souhra Ali Mohamed was making her second appearance at the Summer Olympics. She had previously competed in the women's 400 metres event at the 2012 Games. She had also competed in the 2010 Summer Youth Olympics. In the women's 1500 metres event of the 2020 Olympics, she was drawn in heat three which took place on 2 August. Souhra however was unable to finish the race and did not advance to later rounds of the competition. her heat was led by Kenya's Faith Kipyegon who went on to win the gold medal in the finals and achieve an Olympic record with a time of 3 minutes and 53.11 seconds.

Key

- Note–Ranks given for track events are within the athlete's heat only
- Q = Qualified for the next round
- q = Qualified for the next round as a fastest loser or, in field events, by position without achieving the qualifying target
- NR = National record
- N/A = Round not applicable for the event
- Bye = Athlete not required to compete in round

Track & road events

Athlete	Event	Heat		Semifinal		Final	
Athlete	Event	Result	Rank	Result	Rank	Result	Rank
Ayanleh Souleiman	Men's 800 m	DNS		Did not advance			
Ayanleh Souleiman	Men's 1500 m	3:37.25 SB	9 q	DNF		Did not advance	
Souhra Ali Mohamed	Women's 1500 m	DNF		Did not advance			

== Judo ==
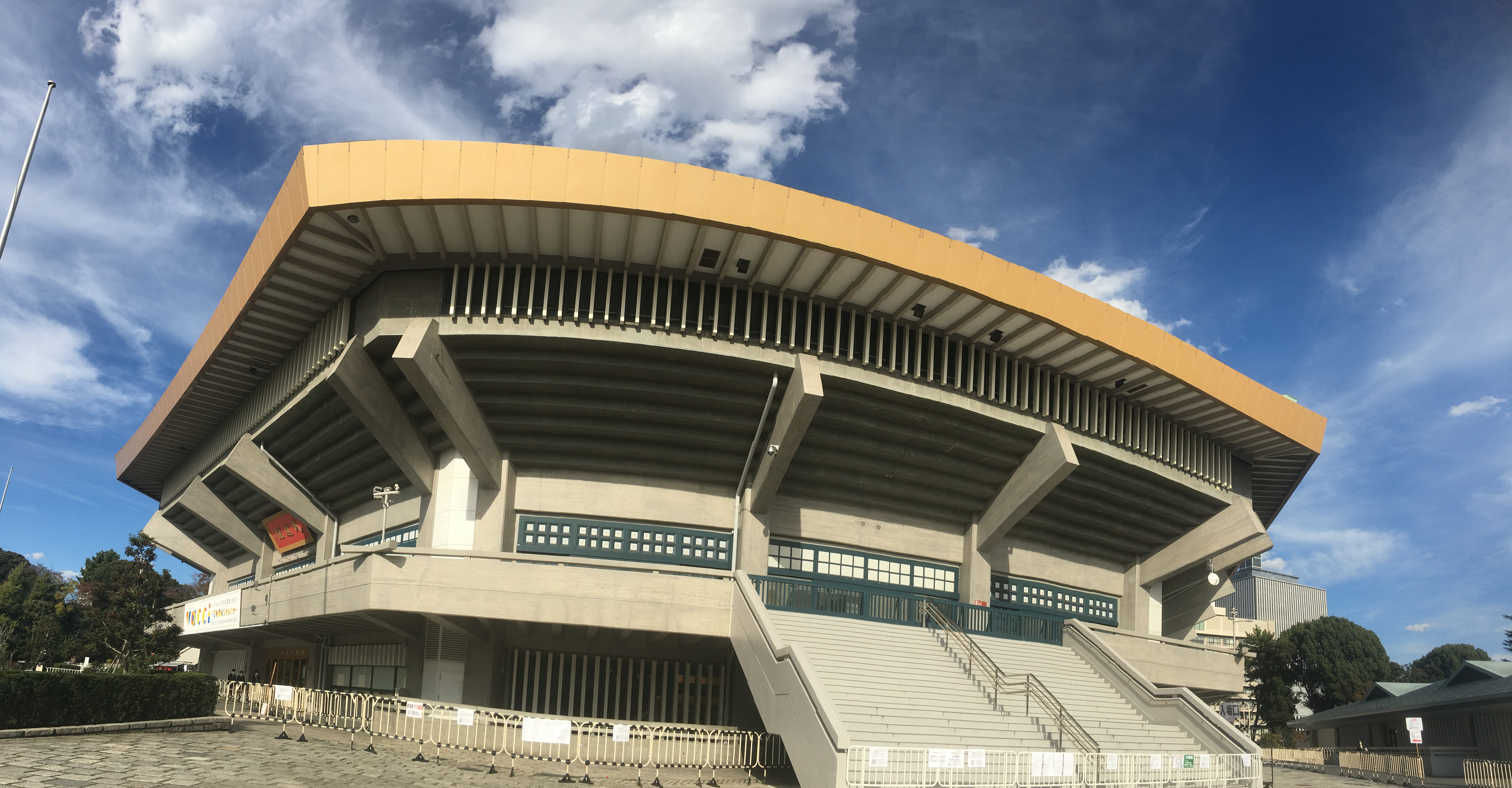
The Nippon Budokan, where the judo events took place.

Djibouti qualified one judoka for the men's lightweight category (73 kg) at the Games. Aden-Alexandre Houssein accepted a continental berth from Africa as the nation's top-ranked judoka outside of direct qualifying position in the IJF World Ranking List of 28 June 2021. He was 23 years old at the time of these Olympics and was making his first appearance at the games. His brother, Anass Houssein competed in the men's half-lightweight for Djibouti at the 2016 Summer Olympics. Houssein competed in the men's lightweight competition, held on 26 July, and received a bye through the first round. In the second round, he beat Chamara Dharmawardana of Sri Lanka in a match that lasted 29 seconds. Houssein defeated Dharmawardana by a tani otoshi, scoring ippon. In the round of 16 he lost to eventual silver medalist Lasha Shavdatuashvili of Georgia. Houssein was defeated by Shavdatuashvili by a uchi mata, receiving a score of waza-ari. As a result, he did not advance to later rounds. He is recorded as finishing a joint 9th place.

Athlete	Event	Round of 64	Round of 32	Round of 16	Quarterfinals	Semifinals	Repechage	Final / BM	
Athlete	Event	Opposition Result	Opposition Result	Opposition Result	Opposition Result	Opposition Result	Opposition Result	Opposition Result	Rank
Aden-Alexandre Houssein	Men's −73 kg	Bye	Dharmawardana (SRI); W 10–00	Shavdatuashvili (GEO); L 00–01	Did not advance				

== Swimming ==
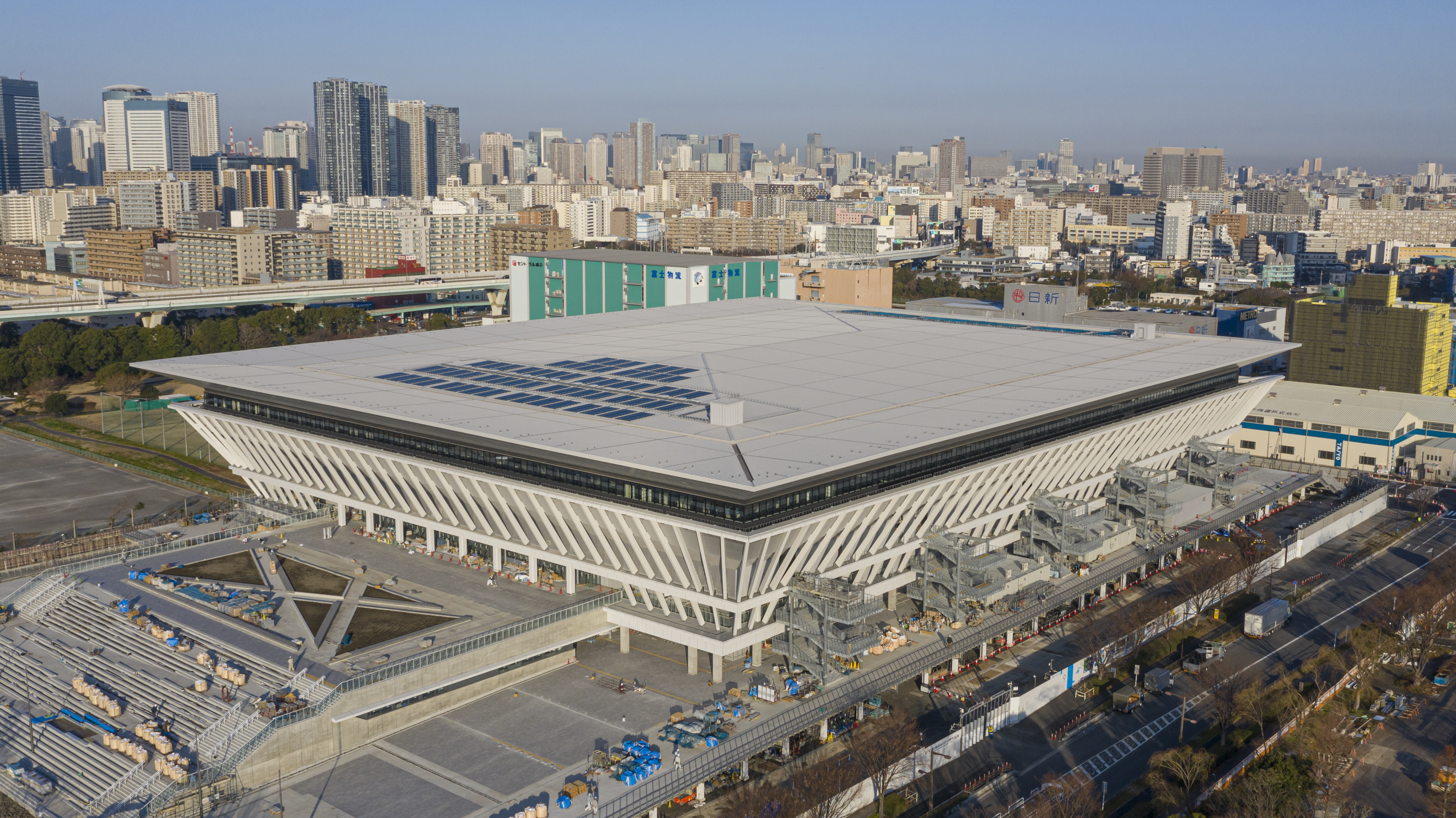
The Tokyo Aquatics Centre, where the aquatic events took place.

Djibouti received a universality invitation from FINA to send a top-ranked male swimmer in his respective individual events to the Olympics, based on the FINA Points System of 28 June 2021. Houssein Gaber Ibrahim qualified for the universality slot from FINA as his best time of 27.95 seconds was not within the Olympic Selection Time (OST) of 22.67 seconds. Ibrahim was drawn in second heat of the men's 50 m freestyle which was held on 30 July, finishing second just behind Charly Ndjoume from the Cameroon with a time of 27.41 seconds. He finished 65th of all swimmers who competed, and did not advance to the later stages of the 50 m freestyle. The medals from the event went to athletes from the United States, France and Brazil.

Athlete	Event	Heat		Semifinal		Final	
Athlete	Event	Time	Rank	Time	Rank	Time	Rank
Houssein Gaber Ibrahim	Men's 50 m freestyle	27.41	65	Did not advance			
