= Djibouti at the 1988 Summer Olympics =

- IOC code: DJI
- NOC: Comité National Olympique Djiboutien

in Seoul
- Competitors: 6 in 2 sports
- Flag bearer: Ahmed Salah
- Medals Ranked 46th: Gold 0 Silver 0 Bronze 1 Total 1

Summer Olympics appearances (overview)
- 1984; 1988; 1992; 1996; 2000; 2004; 2008; 2012; 2016; 2020; 2024

Djibouti took part in the 1988 Summer Olympics which were held in Seoul, South Korea from September 17 to October 2. The country's participation marked its second appearance in the Summer Olympics since its debut at the 1984 Summer games in Los Angeles, United States. The delegation from Djibouti included six athletes, five in athletics and one in sailing. The five athletes for athletics were Hoche Yaya Aden, Ismael Hassan, Talal Omar Abdillahi, Hussein Ahmed Salah, and Omar Moussa while Robleh Ali Adou represented the nation in sailing. Ahmed Salah won the nation's first Olympic medal, which is a bronze at the Men's Marathon event.

== Background ==
The 1988 Summer Olympics were Djibouti's second Summer Olympics, with the first being the 1984 Games in Los Angeles, United States. Djibouti made their Olympic debut in 1984, sending three athletes.

== Competitors ==
The following is the list of number of competitors in the Games.

Sport	Men	Women	Total
Athletics	5	0	5
Sailing	1	0	1
Total	6	0	6

== Medalists ==
Prior to the 1988 Summer Olympics, Djibouti had not won an Olympic Medal. Hussein Ahmed Salah won the nation's first medal, a bronze in athletics for the men's marathon on October 2, 1988. Ahmed Salah won the medal with a time of two hours, ten minutes and fifty-nine seconds, only twenty-seven seconds behind the gold medalist. Ahmed Salah finished the qualification for this event in 2:07:07, breaking the previous world record of 2:07:12. The record was also broken by Carlos Lopes, who finished ahead of Salah with a time of 2:06:49. Lopes became the new world record holder.

Medal	Name	Sport	Event	Date
Bronze	Hussein Ahmed Salah	Athletics	Men's marathon	October 2

== Athletics ==
Many of the athletics events of the 1988 Summer olympics were held at the Seoul Olympic Stadium (pictured above).

Djibouti was represented by five male athletes at the 1988 Summer Olympics in athletics: Hoche Yaya Aden, Ismael Hassan, Talal Omar Abdillahi, Hussein Ahmed Salah, and Omar Moussa. These were the first Summer Olympic Games that Aden, Hassan, Abdillahi, and Moussa participated in. Ahmad Salah had previously competed in the 1984 Summer Olympics.

Hoche Yaya Aden competed in the men's 1500 meters, where he finished twelfth in his heat, failing to advance to the next round. The medals in the event went to athletes from Kenya, Great Britain, and East Germany.

Ismael Hassan competed in the men's 5000 meters, where he finished fourteenth in his heat, failing to advance to the next round. The medals in the event went to athletes from Kenya, West Germany, and East Germany.

Talal Omar Abdlillahi competed in the men's 10000 meters, where he finished eighteenth heat, failing to advance to the next round. The medals in the event went to athletes from Morocco, Italy, and Kenya.

Hussein Ahmed Salah and Omar Moussa both competed in the men's marathon. Ahmad Salah finished the marathon in two hours, ten minutes, and fifty-nine seconds claiming the bronze medal for the event. He finished only twenty-seven seconds behind the gold medalist. Moussa finished the marathon in two hours, twenty-five minutes and twenty-five seconds placing forty-ninth of the 118 athletes who competed. The gold and silver medals in the event went to athletes from Italy, and Kenya.

Men
Track & road events

Athlete	Event	Heat		Semifinal		Final	
Athlete	Event	Result	Rank (Note: The ranks indicate how the individual athletes places in each of their heats, not their overall placing.)	Result	Rank	Result	Rank
Hoche Yaya Aden	1500 m	3:51.56	12	did not advance			
Ismael Hassan	5000 m	14:45.40	14	did not advance			
Talal Omar Abdillahi	10000 m	30:08.53	18	—N/a		did not advance	
Hussein Ahmed Salah	marathon	—N/a				2:10:59	(bronze)
Omar Moussa	marathon	—N/a				2:25:25	49

== Sailing ==
Djibouti was represented by one male athlete at the 1988 Summer Olympics in sailing: Robleh Ali Adou. These were the first games in which Djibouti participated in a sailing event.

Robleh Ali Adou competed in the Mixed Windsurfer event. Ali Adou finished in the standings fortieth out of forty-five athletes competing, scoring a total of 307 points and a net point value of 255. The medals for the event went to athletes from New Zealand, Netherlands Antilles, and the United States.

Key

- PMS = Premature start
- RET = Retired
- ~~Text~~ = Lowest score discarded

Rank	Helmsman	Event	Race I		Race II		Race III		Race IV		Race V		Race VI		Race VII		Score	Rank
Rank	Helmsman	Event	Rank	Points	Rank	Points	Rank	Points	Rank	Points	Rank	Points	Rank	Points	Rank	Points	Score	Rank
40	Robleh Ali Adou	Division II	38	44.0	31	37.0	32	38.0	37	43.0	~~PMS~~	~~52.0~~	35	41.0	RET	52.0	255.0	40
