= Djibouti at the 2008 Summer Olympics =

- IOC code: DJI
- NOC: Comité National Olympique Djiboutien

in Beijing
- Competitors: 2 in 1 sports
- Flag bearer: Hussein Ahmed Salah
- Medals: Gold 0 Silver 0 Bronze 0 Total 0

Summer Olympics appearances (overview)
- 1984; 1988; 1992; 1996; 2000; 2004; 2008; 2012; 2016; 2020; 2024

Djibouti took part in the 2008 Summer Olympics, which were held in Beijing, China, from 8 to 24 August 2008. The country's participation at Beijing marked its sixth appearance in the Summer Olympics since its debut in 1984. The Djibouti delegation included two athletes in 2008; Mahamoud Farah, a middle-distance runner, and Fathia Ali Bouraleh, a sprinter. Hussein Ahmed Salah, Djibouti's only Olympic medalist, was selected as the flag bearer for both the opening and closing ceremonies despite not competing in 2008. None of the Djiboutian athletes progressed further than the heat round.

== Background ==
Djibouti participated in five summer Olympic games between its debut in the 1984 Summer Olympics in Los Angeles, United States, and the 2008 Summer Olympics in Beijing. Djibouti made their Olympic debut in 1984, sending three athletes to the games. The most number of Djiboutian athletes participating in a summer games is eight in the 1992 games in Barcelona, Spain. Only one Djiboutian athlete has ever won a medal at the Olympics, that was Hussein Ahmed Salah, a marathon runner, who won a bronze medal in the 1988 marathon. Two athletes from Djibouti were selected to compete in the Beijing games; Mahamoud Farah in the track and field 1500 meters and Fathia Ali Bouraleh in the track and field 100 m.

== Athletics ==
Djibouti was represented by one male athlete at the 2008 Olympics in athletics: Mahamoud Farah, a 1500 meters runner. It was Farah's Olympic debut but he had previously competed in the 2007 IAAF World Championships. He competed on 15 August in Beijing, and finished 8th out of 12 in heat four (Note: One athlete, Rashid Ramzi, was disqualified.) in a time of 3 minutes and 43.62 seconds. He was 8.83 seconds behind the winner of his heat, Mohamed Moustaoui. Overall he finished 42nd out of 53 athletes, and he was 1.32 seconds slower than the slowest athlete that progressed to the semi-final round and, therefore, that was the end of his competition.

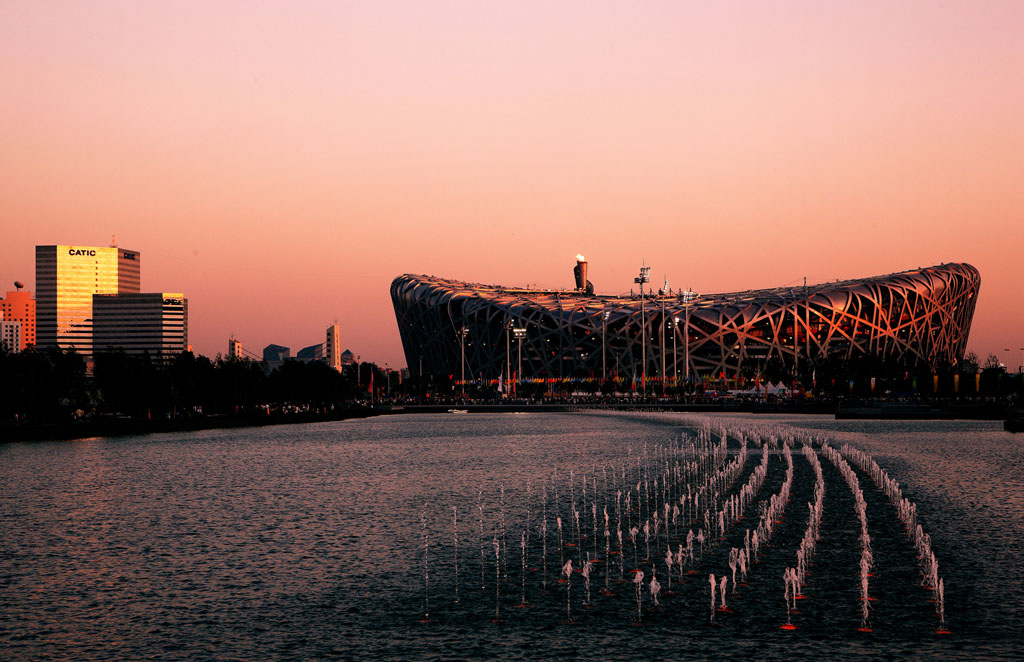
The Beijing National Stadium, where Farah and Ali Bouraleh competed

Competing at her first Olympics, Fathia Ali Bouraleh was the oldest competitor for Djibouti at these Olympics, aged 20. She competed in the 100 meters on 16 August. Ali Bouraleh was drawn into heat four. Ali Bouraleh ran a time of 14.29 seconds and finished last in her heat, 2.99 second behind the winner, Chandra Sturrup. She finished 84th out of 85 athletes overall and was 0.51 seconds faster than the slowest athlete, Robina Muqimyar. She was 3.16 seconds behind the fastest athlete and 2.64 seconds behind the slowest athlete who progressed to the semi-finals, Thi Huong Vu. Therefore, Ali Bouraleh did not progress to the quarter-finals.

Key

- Note–Ranks given for track events are within the athlete's heat only
- Q = Qualified for the next round
- q = Qualified for the next round as a fastest loser or, in field events, by position without achieving the qualifying target
- NR = National record
- N/A = Round not applicable for the event
- Bye = Athlete not required to compete in round

Athlete	Event	Heat		Quarterfinal		Semifinal		Final	
Athlete	Event	Result	Rank	Result	Rank	Result	Rank	Result	Rank
Fathia Ali Bouraleh	Women's 100 m	14.29	8	did not advance					
Mahamoud Farah	Men's 1500 m	3:43.62	9	—N/a		did not advance			
