= Djibouti at the 2022 World Athletics Championships =

- Flag of Djibouti
- WA code: DJI

in Eugene, United States 15 July 2022 – 24 July 2022
- Competitors: 2 (2 men)
- Medals: Gold 0 Silver 0 Bronze 0 Total 0

World Athletics Championships appearances (overview)
- 1983; 1987; 1991; 1993; 1995; 1997; 1999; 2001; 2003; 2005; 2007; 2009; 2011; 2013; 2015; 2017; 2019; 2022; 2023; 2025

Djibouti competed at the 2022 World Athletics Championships in Eugene, United States, from 15 to 24 July 2022.

== Results ==
Djibouti entered 2 athletes.

Key

- Q = Qualified for the next round
- q = Qualified for the next round as a fastest loser or, in field events, by position without achieving the qualifying target
- NR = National record
- PB = Personal best
- SB = Season best
- N/A = Round not applicable for the event

=== Men ===
Track and road events

Athlete	Event	Heat		Final	
Athlete	Event	Result	Rank	Result	Rank
Mohamed Ismail	3000 m steeplechase	8:25.85	24	did not advance	
Ibrahim Hassan	Marathon	—N/a		DNF	
