= Omar Abdillahi =

Omar Abdillahi may refer to:

- Omar Abdillahi Charmarke Cochine (born 1954), Djiboutian long-distance runner
- Talal Omar Abdillahi (born 1967), Djiboutian long-distance runner
