= Djibouti at the 1983 World Championships in Athletics =

- Flag of Djibouti
- WA code: DJI

in Helsinki, Finland August 7–14, 1983
- Competitors: 2 (1 man and 1 woman) in 4 events
- Medals: Gold 0 Silver 0 Bronze 0 Total 0

World Championships in Athletics appearances
- 1983; 1987; 1991; 1993; 1995; 1997; 1999; 2001; 2003; 2005; 2007; 2009; 2011; 2013; 2015; 2017; 2019; 2022; 2023

Djibouti competed at the 1983 World Championships in Athletics in Helsinki, Finland, from August 7 to 14, 1983.

== Men ==
Track and road events

Athlete	Event	Final	
Athlete	Event	Result	Rank
Djama Robleh	Marathon	2:24:04	47
Hussein Ahmed Salah	Marathon	DNF	
