= Takeyuki Nakayama =

Japanese long-distance runner

Takeyuki Nakayama (中山 竹通, Nakayama Takeyuki; born December 20, 1959 in Ikeda, Nagano) is a former Japanese world-class marathon runner. He represented his native country at the 1988 Summer Olympics in Seoul, South Korea, the 1992 Summer Olympics in Barcelona, Spain and the 1986 Asian Games in Seoul, South Korea (gold medal).

Nakayama's notable marathon wins include Fukuoka Marathon (1984, 1987), the Seoul marathon (1985), and the Tokyo marathon (1990). In 1985 Nakayama set the 2nd record in the world from the 1st World Cup Marathon (2:08:15). As of 2007, Nakayama is a coach at the Aichi Seiko Track Team.

== Achievements ==
Year	Competition	Venue	Position	Event	Notes
Representing Japan
1983	Fukuoka Marathon	Fukuoka, Japan	14th	Marathon	2:14:15
1984	Fukuoka Marathon	Fukuoka, Japan	1st	Marathon	2:10:00
1985	1985 World Marathon Cup	Hiroshima, Japan	2nd	Marathon	2:08:15
1986	Tokyo International Marathon	Tokyo, Japan	4th	Marathon	2:08:43
1986	Asian Games	Seoul, South Korea	1st	Marathon	2:08:21
1987	Tokyo International Marathon	Tokyo, Japan	2nd	Marathon	2:10:33
1987	Fukuoka Marathon	Fukuoka, Japan	1st	Marathon	2:08:18
1988	Olympic Games	Seoul, South Korea	4th	Marathon	2:11:05
1990	Tokyo Marathon	Tokyo, Japan	1st	Marathon	2:10:57
1991	Beppu-Ōita Marathon	Beppu, Ōita, Japan	2nd	Marathon	2:09:12
1991	World Championships	Tokyo, Japan	—	Marathon	DNF
1992	Tokyo International Marathon	Tokyo, Japan	2nd	Marathon	2:10:25
1992	Olympic Games	Barcelona, Spain	4th	Marathon	2:14:02
1994	Paris Marathon	Paris, France	8th	Marathon	2:13:11
1994	Fukuoka Marathon	Fukuoka, Japan	17th	Marathon	2:15:23
