= Fathia Ali Bouraleh =

Djiboutian sprinter

Personal information
- Born: October 14, 1987 (age 38)

Sport
- Country: Djibouti
- Sport: Athletics
- Event: 100m

Fathia Ali Bouraleh (born October 14, 1987) is a track and field sprint athlete who competes internationally for Djibouti.

Ali Bouraleh said that she became a fast runner because when she was younger, she was a thief. Ali Bouraleh started training for athletics in 2004 at her high school. She won an event at her high school, and impressed the coach enough that he invited her back to train twice a week. He also gave her running shoes, and promised to tutor her in her schoolwork. She trained in a stadium, because when she ran in the streets people would hurl stones and insults at her, even though she was wearing long pants and a head scarf. Her nickname is "Mama," and if spectators insulted Ali Bouraleh while running, her teammates would yell back at them "Don't insult our Mama!"

Ali Bouraleh represented Djibouti at the 2008 Summer Olympics in Beijing as Djibouti's second female Olympian. She competed at the 100 metres sprint and placed eighth in her heat without advancing to the second round. She made a false start in her first attempt. In the second attempt, she ran with a time of 14.29 seconds, one of her slowest of the year. She finished last in her heat and with the second slowest time overall. Bouraleh competed with her headscarf on, which in her opinion did not affect her finishing time.

She is now coaching Girls Run 2, along with Cintia Guzman. She lives and coaches in the capital, Djibouti, which is where half of the Girls Run 2 club trains. In addition to coaching the athletes, Bouraleh also provides equipment and financial support for the athletes at both training locations.
