= Djibouti at the 2017 World Championships in Athletics =

- WA code: DJI

in London
- Competitors: 4 in 4 events
- Medals: Gold 0 Silver 0 Bronze 0 Total 0

World Championships in Athletics appearances
- 1983; 1987; 1991; 1993; 1995; 1997; 1999; 2001; 2003; 2005; 2007; 2009; 2011; 2013; 2015; 2017; 2019; 2022; 2023; 2025

Djibouti competed at the 2017 World Championships in Athletics in London, United Kingdom, from 4–13 August 2017.

== Results ==
(q – qualified, NM – no mark, SB – season best)

=== Men ===
Track and road events

Athlete	Event	Heat		Semifinal		Final	
Athlete	Event	Result	Rank	Result	Rank	Result	Rank
Ayanleh Souleiman	1500 metres	3:46.64	33	Did not advance			
Jamal Abdi Dirieh	5000 metres	13:28.98	12	—N/a		Did not advance	
Mumin Gala	Marathon	—N/a				DNS	–
Mohamed Ismail Ibrahim	3000m steeplechase	8:33.77	25	—N/a		Did not advance	
