= Omar Moussa (runner) =

Djiboutian long-distance runner

Personal information
- Born: February 8, 1961 (age 65)
Medal record
Men's athletics
Representing Djibouti
Arab Athletics Championships
Silver medal – second place	1983 Amman	Marathon

Omar Moussa Bouh (born 8 February 1961), also spelled Omar Musa, is a Djiboutian long-distance runner who specializes in the marathon. He won the marathon silver medal at the 1983 Arab Athletics Championships, and finished 4th at the 1994 Francophone Games.

== Career ==
Moussa's first international medal was at the 1983 Arab Athletics Championships in Amman, placing 2nd in the marathon. At the 1988 Summer Olympics, he finished 49th in the marathon.

The following year at the 1989 World Marathon Cup, Moussa finished 46th with a time of 2:19:18 hours. Moussa ran his marathon personal best of 2:13:57 in 1994. He also competed at the Francophone Games in 1994, where he finished 4th in the marathon, less than three minutes behind bronze medallist Omar Abdillahi Charmarke.

Moussa finished runner-up at the inaugural Lille Marathon, 3rd at the 1986 Marathon Beneva de Montréal, and 5th at the 1986 Paris Marathon.

He again entered the marathon at the 1996 Summer Olympics but he didn't finish the course.
