= Sally Raguib =

Djiboutian judoka

Personal information
- Born: 8 September 1996 (age 29) Djibouti

Sport
- Sport: Judo
Medal record
Representing Djibouti
Women's judo
Pan Arab Games
Bronze medal – third place	2011 Doha	-57 kg

Sally Raguib (born 8 September 1996) is a Djiboutian judoka. She competed in the Women's 57 kg event at the 2012 Summer Olympics. At the 2012 Olympic games, Raguib lost against Corina Stefan of Romania. In addition to the Olympic games, Sally Raguib has competed in multiple African Championships and the World Championships in Ljubljana in 2013.
