= Houssein Gaber Ibrahim =

Djiboutian swimmer

Personal information
- Born: January 1, 1999 (age 27) Djibouti

Sport
- Sport: Swimming

Hussein Gaber Ibrahim (born 1 January 1999) is a Djiboutian swimmer. He competed in the men's 50m freestyle event at the 2020 Summer Olympics.
