= Moussa Souleiman =

Djiboutian long-distance athlete (born 1962)

Moussa Souleiman (born 1962) is a Djiboutian long-distance athlete.

Souleiman competed for his country at the 1992 Summer Olympics held in Barcelona, he entered the 5000 metres where he came 13th in his heat so didn't qualify for the next round.
