= Houssein Djama =

Djiboutian middle-distance runner

Houssein Djama (born 23 July 1968), is a Djiboutian middle-distance athlete.

== Competition Results ==
Djama competed for his country at the 1992 Summer Olympics held in Barcelona, he entered the 1500 metres where he came seventh in his heat, so did not qualify for the next round.
