= Djibouti at the 2015 World Championships in Athletics =

- WA code: DJI

in Beijing
- Competitors: 3
- Medals: Gold 0 Silver 0 Bronze 0 Total 0

World Championships in Athletics appearances
- 1983; 1987; 1991; 1993; 1995; 1997; 1999; 2001; 2003; 2005; 2007; 2009; 2011; 2013; 2015; 2017; 2019; 2022; 2023

Djibouti competed at the 2015 World Championships in Athletics in Beijing, China, from 22 to 30 August 2015.

== Results ==
(q – qualified, NM – no mark, SB – season best)

=== Men ===
Track and road events

Athlete	Event	Heat		Semifinal		Final	
Athlete	Event	Result	Rank	Result	Rank	Result	Rank
Youssouf Hiss Bachir	1500 metres	3:44.48	32	Did not advance			
Abdi Waiss Mouhyadin	1500 metres	3:38.66	8 q	3:46.82	23	Did not advance	
Ayanleh Souleiman	1500 metres	DNF		Did not advance			
Mohamed Ismail Ibrahim	3000 metres steeplechase	DNS		—		Did not advance	
