= Kadra Mohamed Dembil =

Djiboutian middle-distance runner

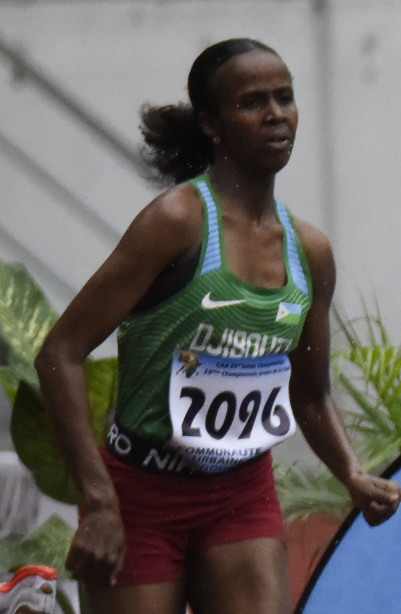

Personal information
- Born: April 22, 1997 (age 29)
- Height: 5 ft 1 in (155 cm)
- Weight: 121 lb (55 kg)

Sport
- Country: Djibouti
- Sport: Athletics
- Event: 1500m

Kadra Mohamed Dembil (born April 22, 1997) is an ethnically Somali Djiboutian middle-distance runner who lives in Ali Sabieh. Kadra dropped out of high school. She speaks Somali and knows some French.

Kadra joined a club, Girls Run 2, in 2012, which paid for running equipment, transportation to the capital to compete in races, and school expenses. In the club, she was the fastest for the 3000-metre run, making it difficult to train since there were no competitors to help keep the pace. The gymnasium she trained at contains a track, hurdles, and weights made from powdered milk cans filled with cement. Kadra started the 2013–14 season with Girls Run 2, but was offered a job with the Republican Guard (military personnel responsible for guarding the president), and finished her season with them.

== Olympics contests ==
This additional exposure made her well known enough she was sent to the 2014 Junior Olympics in Nanjing for the 2000-metre steeplechase, a race she had never run before. To train, the pit was initially filled with cushions and pillows, as water is a very valuable commodity in Djibouti. Once Kadra was accustomed to that, the pit was filled with water so she could train for the Junior Olympics. Although Kadra entered the Junior Olympics with the worst personal record, she finished with a time of 7:07, breaking her personal record by 50 seconds and finishing 11th in the first heat. During the second heat, Kadra fell at the third water jump, pushing her back to 5th place; when combined with the first heat, her final position was 14th place.

She competed at the 2016 Summer Olympics in the women's 1500 metres race; her time of 4:42.67 in the heats did not qualify her for the semifinals.
