= Robleh Ali Adou =

Djiboutian windsurfer (born 1964)

Personal information
- Native name: روبله علي أدو
- Full name: Robleh Ali Adou
- Nationality: Djiboutian
- Born: 17 June 1964 (age 61)

Sailing career
- Class(es): Division II, Lechner A-390, Mistral One Design

Robleh Ali Adou (Arabic: روبله علي أدو; born 17 June 1964) is a Djiboutian windsurfer. He was the first sailor to compete for Djibouti at the Olympics after he had competed at the 1988 Summer Olympics. At the games, he had competed in the men's Division II class and placed 40th in the event.

He would also compete at the 1992 Summer Olympics and 1996 Summer Olympics in the men's Lechner A-390 class and the men's Mistral One Design class respectively. He did not medal in either of the events.

== Biography ==
Robleh Ali Adou was born on 17 June 1964. He would be the first sailor to compete for Djibouti at the Olympics.

Adou's first Olympics would be at the 1988 Summer Olympics in Seoul, South Korea. There, he competed in the men's Division II class at the Busan Yachting Center (Course Bravo) from 20 to 27 September. He accumulated 255.0 net points with a final total of 307.0 points. He placed 40th out of the 45 sailors that competed in the event.

He then competed at the 1992 Summer Olympics in Barcelona, Spain. He competed in the men's Lechner A-390 class at the Port Olímpic from 27 July to 2 August. He accumulated 376.0 net points with a final total of 427.0 points. He placed 39th out of the 45 sailors that competed in the event.

Adou's final games would be at the 1996 Summer Olympics in Los Angeles, United States. He would compete in the men's Mistral One Design class at the Wassaw Sound in Georgia from 23 July to 29 July. He had accumulated 312.0 net points with a final total of 406.0 points. He had placed last out of the 46 sailors that competed in the event.
