= Djibouti at the 2013 World Championships in Athletics =

- WA code: DJI
- National federation: FDA

in Moscow
- Competitors: 1
- Medals: Gold 0 Silver 0 Bronze 1 Total 1

World Championships in Athletics appearances
- 1983; 1987; 1991; 1993; 1995; 1997; 1999; 2001; 2003; 2005; 2007; 2009; 2011; 2013; 2015; 2017; 2019; 2022; 2023

Djibouti competed at the 2013 World Championships in Athletics in Moscow, Russia, from 10–18 August 2013. A team of 1 athlete was announced to represent the country in the event.

== Results ==
=== Men ===
Athlete	Event	Heats		Semifinals		Final	
Athlete	Event	Time	Rank	Time	Rank	Time	Rank
Ayanleh Souleiman	800 metres	1:46.86	17 Q	1:44.99	8 Q	1:43.76	3rd place, bronze medalist(s)
Ayanleh Souleiman	1500 metres	3:38.63	9 Q	3:37.96	11	did not advance	
