= Bourhan Abro =

Djiboutian swimmer (born 1995)

Personal information
- Nationality: Djiboutian
- Born: 30 May 1995 (age 31)

Sport
- Sport: Swimming

Bourhan Ahmad Muhammad Abro (born 30 May 1995) is a Djiboutian swimmer. He competed in the men's 50 metre freestyle event at the 2016 Summer Olympics, where he ranked 74th with a time of 27.13 seconds, in a field of 85 swimmers. He did not advance to the semifinals.
