= Roda Ali Wais =

Djiboutian middle-distance runner

Personal information
- Born: 14 April 1984 (age 42)
- Height: 5 ft 2 in (157 cm)
- Weight: 115 lb (52 kg)

Sport
- Country: Djibouti
- Sport: Athletics
- Events: 800 m, 1,500 m

Roda Ali Wais (Somali: Rooda Cali Wacays; born 14 April 1984) is a former middle-distance athlete who competed for Djibouti before defecting to Australia.

She competed at the 2000 Summer Olympics in Sydney, New South Wales, Australia and at the 2003 World Championships in Athletics in Paris, France. Wais was the first Djiboutian woman to compete at the Olympics.

== Personal life ==
Wais was born on 14 April 1984 in Djibouti. Wais has lived in Australia since her defection and is married with children.

== Athletics career ==
Wais was only 16 when she was included in the Djibouti delegation for the 2000 Summer Olympics in Sydney, New South Wales, Australia. By competing, she became the first woman to represent Djibouti at the Olympics. She competed in the heats for the women's 800 m on 22 September 2000 which were held at the Sydney Olympic Stadium in Sydney Olympic Park, Sydney. She finished eighth and last in her heat in a time of two minutes 31.71 seconds – the slowest time recorded in the competition.

Three years later, aged 19, Wais represented Djibouti at the 2003 World Championships in Athletics held at the Stade de France in Saint-Denis, Seine-Saint-Denis, France – a suburb of Paris. She contested the heats for the women's 1,500 m on 27 August 2003. She finished 10th and last in her heat in a time of five minutes 10.16 seconds – 40 seconds slower than any other competitor.

Wais later defected to Australia with the help of a Somali Australian. She has not competed for Djibouti since the 2003 World Championships in Athletics.
