= Anass Houssein =

Djiboutian judoka

Personal information
- Born: 10 January 1995 (age 31) Djibouti City, Djibouti

Sport
- Sport: Judo

Anass Houssein (born 10 January 1995) is a Djiboutian judoka.

He competed at the 2016 Summer Olympics in Rio de Janeiro, in the men's 66 kg, where he lost to Ma Duanbin in the second round.
