= Djibouti National Olympic and Sports Committee =

National Olympic Committee

- Country: Djibouti
- Code: DJI
- Recognized: 1984
- Continental Association: ANOCA
- Headquarters: Djibouti City, Djibouti
- President: Aïcha Garad Ali
- Secretary General: Faissal Abdourahman
- Website: https://web.archive.org/web/20191212232627/https://cnos-djibouti.org/

The Djibouti National Olympic and Sports Committee (French: Comité National Olympique et Sportif Djiboutien) (CNOSD, IOC code: DJI) is the National Olympic Committee representing Djibouti.

A vote on 4 January 2017 came out in favor of Aicha Garad for her third term. The next day, 12 of the 22 sports federations filed an appeal to the IOC. The complaint lodged was that an insufficient number of representatives were present at the vote (seven out of 22). They stated in the letter that "...having found numerous irregularities and formal defects in the ballot organized by the outgoing President Mrs. Aicha Garad in the absence of the majority of Federation Presidents, only 7 of 22 were present." Ahmed Salah also filed a complaint for the vote, including that the vote took place without international observers present.

== History ==
The Djibouti National Olympic and Sports Committee was founded in 1983 and recognized in 1984. CNOSD is in Zone 7 of the Association of National Olympic Committees of Africa. The current president of the committee is Aïcha Garad Ali, who was appointed in 2005 and subsequently re-elected in 2013, 2017 and 2021.

== Events ==
=== Olympics ===
Djibouti participates in the Olympic Games in the Summer Olympics and have not competed at the Winter Games. Djibouti entered the Olympic Games for the first time at the 1984 Summer Games in Los Angeles, United States. The delegation featured three athletes, all competing in the men's marathon. Djama Robleh finished eighth with a time of 2:11:39, while Hussein Ahmed Salah and Omar Abdillahi Charmarke came in 20th and 32nd place respectively.

Four years later, at the 1988 Summer Games, Ahmed Salah earned Djibouti's only medal, a bronze for finishing third in the men's marathon.

== See also ==
- Djibouti at the African Games
- Djibouti at the Olympics
