= Djama Robleh =

Djiboutian long-distance runner

Medal record

Men's athletics

Representing Djibouti

African Championships
Silver medal – second place	1982 Cairo	Marathon

Djama Robleh (Somali: Jaamac Rooble) (born December 31, 1958) is a retired Djiboutian long-distance runner who specialized in the marathon race.

He won the silver medal in this event at the 1982 African Championships and finished eighth in the marathon at the 1984 Summer Olympics. Additionally, he placed 47th at the 1983 World Championships, took third in the 1985 World Marathon Cup (in which his team finished first), and entered the 1987 World Championships without finishing the race.

His personal best time came as he trailed Steve Jones to a second-place finish in the 1985 Chicago Marathon. Robleh's time was 2:08:08, a winning time for most year, but Jones ran a near-world record at the race, clocking a 2:07:17.

The current Djiboutian record is held by Ahmed Salah with 2:07:07 hours.

== Achievements ==
Year	Competition	Venue	Position	Event	Notes
Representing Djibouti
1982	African Championships	Cairo, Egypt	2nd	Marathon	2:31:06
1983	World Championships	Helsinki, Finland	47th	Marathon	2:24:04
1984	Olympic Games	Los Angeles, United States	8th	Marathon	2:11:39
1985	1985 World Marathon Cup	Hiroshima, Japan	3rd	Marathon	2:08:26
1987	World Championships	Rome, Italy	—	Marathon	DNF
