= Omar Abdillahi Charmarke =

Djiboutian long-distance runner (born 1954)

Omar Abdillahi Charmarke Cochine (born 1954) is a Djiboutian long-distance runner who specialized in the marathon.

Charmarke was a member of the first ever Djibouti Olympic team, when he and two others entered the marathon at the 1984 Summer Olympics held in Los Angeles, he finished 32nd in the race.
