= Bouh Ibrahim =

Djiboutian long-distance runner

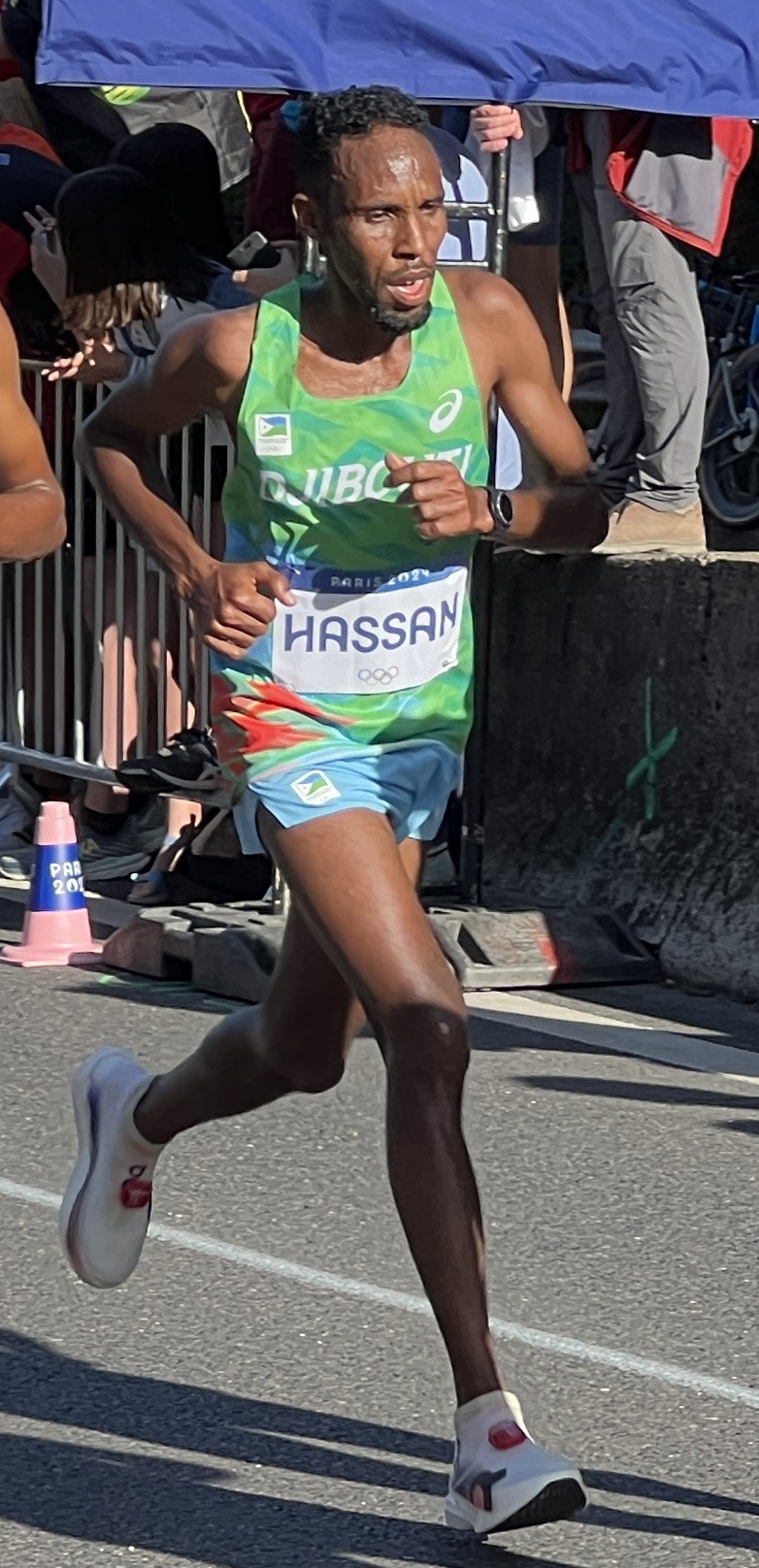
- 2024 Summer Olympics

Personal information
- Born: 1 January 1997 (age 29)

Sport
- Country: Djibouti
- Sport: Long-distance running

Bouh Ibrahim (born 1 January 1997), also known as Ibrahim Hassan, is a Djiboutian long-distance runner.

In 2019, he represented Djibouti at the 2019 African Games held in Rabat, Morocco. He competed in the men's 5000 metres and he finished in 8th place. In the same year, he also competed in the men's 5000 metres event at the 2019 World Athletics Championships held in Doha, Qatar. He did not qualify to compete in the final.

Ibrahim won the 2023 Beppu-Ōita Marathon in a time of 2:06:43 hours, setting the course record. He competed in the marathon at the 2024 Olympics, where he finished 14th. He was also the flag bearer for Djibouti during the closing ceremony of the 2024 Olympics. Ibrahim held two Djiboutian records and holds a half marathon personal best of 59:41 minutes.
