= Hussein Ahmed Salah =

Djiboutian long-distance runner

Personal information
- Full name: Hussein Ahmed Salah
- Born: 31 December 1956 (age 69) Ali Sabieh, French Somaliland

Sport
- Sport: Track
Medal record
Men's athletics
Representing Djibouti
Olympic Games
Bronze medal – third place	1988 Seoul	Marathon
World Championships
Silver medal – second place	1987 Rome	Marathon
Silver medal – second place	1991 Tokyo	Marathon
African Championships
Gold medal – first place	1985 Cairo	Marathon
Silver medal – second place	1984 Rabat	10,000 m

Hussein Ahmed Salah (Arabic: حسين أحمد صلاح, Somali: Xuseen Axmed Saalax) is a Djiboutian former long-distance runner, best known for winning a bronze medal in the marathon at the 1988 Summer Olympics. He also won silver medals in this event at the 1987 and 1991 World Championships. In addition, he won the 1985 IAAF World Marathon Cup. He also came second in the New York Marathon in 1985, and won the Paris Marathon in 1986.

His personal best time was 2:07:07, achieved in a 2nd-place finish in the Rotterdam Marathon in April 1988. He and race winner Belayneh Densamo both ran faster than Carlos Lopes' World Record of 2:07:12, set on the Rotterdam course in 1985. Salah's 2:07:07 is the current national record for Djibouti. He also holds the national record in 10,000 metres with 28:17.4 minutes. He is the only Djiboutian athlete to win an Olympic medal.

== International competitions ==
Year	Competition	Venue	Position	Event	Notes
Representing Djibouti
1983	World Championships	Helsinki, Finland	—	Marathon	DNF
1984	African Championships	Rabat, Morocco	2nd	10,000 m	28:17.40
1984	Olympic Games	Los Angeles, United States	20th	Marathon	2:15:59
1985	African Championships	Cairo, Egypt	1st	Marathon	2:23:01
1985	World Cup	Hiroshima, Japan	1st	Marathon	2:08:09
1987	World Championships	Rome, Italy	2nd	Marathon	2:12:30
1988	Olympic Games	Seoul, South Korea	3rd	Marathon	2:10:59
1991	World Championships	Tokyo, Japan	2nd	Marathon	2:15:26
1992	Olympic Games	Barcelona, Spain	30th	Marathon	2:19:04
1995	World Championships	Gothenburg, Sweden	25th	Marathon	2:20:50
1996	Olympic Games	Atlanta, United States	42nd	Marathon	2:20:33

== Road races ==
Year	Competition	Venue	Position	Event	Notes
1985	New York City Marathon	New York City, New York	2nd	Marathon	2:12:27
1986	Paris Marathon	Paris, France	1st	Marathon	2:12:44
1988	Rotterdam Marathon	Rotterdam, Netherlands	2nd	Marathon	2:07:07
1996	Reims Marathon	Reims, France	1st	Marathon	2:10:22
1996	Belgrade Marathon	Belgrade, Yugoslavia	1st	Marathon	2:14:15
1997	Vienna Marathon	Vienna, Austria	1st	Marathon	2:12:53
1997	Monaco Marathon	Monte Carlo, Monaco	2nd	Marathon	2:12:44
1998	Enschede Marathon	Enschede, Netherlands	1st	Marathon	2:13:25

Olympic Games
Preceded by Djama Robleh; Djama Robleh	Flagbearer for Djibouti; Seoul 1988, Atlanta 1996; Beijing 2008	Succeeded by Djama Robleh; Zourah Ali
