= 2024 in the sport of athletics =

2024 in athletics is a year of track and field and road and country and mountain, highlighted by the main event of 2024 Summer Olympics in Paris.

== World records ==
=== Indoor ===
Event	Perf.	N	Athlete(s)	Nat.	Date	Meeting	Location	Ctry.	R	V
Women's 60 m hurdles	7.67		Devynne Charlton	BAH	11 Feb 2024	Millrose Games	New York City	USA		
Women's 60 m hurdles	7.67	A	Tia Jones	USA	16 Feb 2024	USA Championships	Albuquerque	USA		
Men's 60 m hurdles	7.27	A	Grant Holloway	USA	16 Feb 2024	USA Championships	Albuquerque	USA		
Women's 400 m sh	49.24		Femke Bol	NED	18 Feb 2024	Dutch Championships	Apeldoorn	NED		
Men's 400 m sh	44.49	#	Christopher Morales Williams	CAN	24 Feb 2024	SEC Indoor Championships	Fayetteville	USA		
Women's 400 m sh	49.17		Femke Bol	NED	2 Mar 2024	World Indoor Championships	Glasgow	GBR		
Women's 60 m hurdles	7.65		Devynne Charlton	BAH	3 Mar 2024	World Indoor Championships	Glasgow	GBR		

not ratified by World Athletics

=== Outdoor ===
Event	Perf.	N	Athlete(s)	Nat.	Date	Meeting	Location	Ctry.	R	V
Women's 5 km (road)	14:13	Mx	Agnes Ngetich	KEN	14 Jan 2024	10K Valencia Ibercaja	Valencia	ESP		
Women's 10 km (road)	28:46	Mx	Agnes Ngetich	KEN	14 Jan 2024	10K Valencia Ibercaja	Valencia	ESP		
Men's discus throw	74.35 m		Mykolas Alekna	LTU	14 Apr 2024	Oklahoma Throws Series	Ramona	USA		
Men's distance medley relay	9:14.58		Brannon Kidder; Brandon Miller; Isaiah Harris; Henry Wynne	USA	19 April 2024	Oregon Relays	Eugene	USA		
Men's pole vault	6.24 m		Armand Duplantis	SWE	20 Apr 2024	Xiamen Diamond League	Xiamen	CHN		
Women's marathon	2:16:16	Wo	Peres Jepchirchir	KEN	21 Apr 2024	London Marathon	London	GBR		
Men's mile (road)	3:54.56		Emmanuel Wanyonyi	KEN	27 Apr 2024	Adizero: Road to Records	Herzogenaurach	GER		
Women's 10,000 m	28:54.14		Beatrice Chebet	KEN	25 May 2024	Prefontaine Classic	Eugene	USA		
Women's 400 m hurdles	50.65		Sydney McLaughlin-Levrone	USA	30 Jun 2024	US Olympic Trials	Eugene	USA		
Women's high jump	2.10 m		Yaroslava Mahuchikh	UKR	7 July 2024	Meeting de Paris	Paris	FRA		
Women's 1500 m	3:49.04		Faith Kipyegon	KEN	7 July 2024	Meeting de Paris	Paris	FRA		
Women's 2000 m	5:19.70		Jessica Hull	AUS	12 Jul 2024	Herculis	Monaco	MON		
Mixed 4 × 400 metres relay	3:07.41		Vernon Norwood; Shamier Little; Bryce Deadmon; Kaylyn Brown	USA	2 Aug 2024	Olympic Games	Saint-Denis	FRA		
Men's pole vault	6.25 m		Armand Duplantis	SWE	5 Aug 2024	Olympic Games	Saint-Denis	FRA		
Women's 400 m hurdles	50.37		Sydney McLaughlin-Levrone	USA	8 Aug 2024	Olympic Games	Saint-Denis	FRA		
Men's 3000 m	7:17.55		Jakob Ingebrigtsen	NOR	25 Aug 2024	Kamila Skolimowska Memorial	Chorzów	POL		
Men's pole vault	6.26 m		Armand Duplantis	SWE	25 Aug 2024	Kamila Skolimowska Memorial	Chorzów	POL		
Men's mile (road)	3:51.3	h	Elliot Giles	GBR	1 Sep 2024	New Balance KO Meile	Düsseldorf	GER		
Women's marathon	2:09:56	Mx	Ruth Chepngetich	KEN	13 Oct 2024	Chicago Marathon	Chicago	USA		
Men's 35 km race walk	2:21:47		Masatora Kawano	JPN	27 Oct 2024	All Japan Race Walking competition	Takahata	JPN		
Men's half marathon	57:30		Yomif Kejelcha	ETH	27 Oct 2024	Valencia Half Marathon	Valencia	ESP		
Women's 5 km (road)	13:54	Wo	Beatrice Chebet	KEN	31 Dec 2024	Cursa dels Nassos	Barcelona	ESP		

== World leading marks ==
Best marks of the year
Event	Men			Women		
Event	Athlete	Mark	Notes	Athlete	Mark	Notes
60 metres	Christian Coleman (USA)	6.41 s		Julien Alfred (LCA); Ewa Swoboda (POL)	6.98 s	
100 metres	Kishane Thompson (JAM)	9.77 s		Sha'Carri Richardson (USA)	10.71 s	
200 metres	Letsile Tebogo (BOT)	19.46 s	AR	Gabby Thomas (USA)	21.78 s	
400 metres	Quincy Hall (USA)	43.40 s		Marileidy Paulino (DOM)	48.17 s	AR
800 metres	Emmanuel Wanyonyi (KEN)	1:41.11		Keely Hodgkinson (GBR)	1:54.61	NR
1500 metres	Jakob Ingebrigtsen (NOR)	3:26.73	AR	Faith Kipyegon (KEN)	3:49.04	WR
3000 metres	Jakob Ingebrigtsen (NOR)	7:17.55	WR	Gudaf Tsegay (ETH)	8:17.11 sh	
5000 metres	Hagos Gebrhiwet (ETH)	12:36.73	NR	Beatrice Chebet (KEN)	14:09.52	
10,000 metres	Yomif Kejelcha (ETH)	26:31.01		Beatrice Chebet (KEN)	28:54.14	WR
60 metres hurdles	Grant Holloway (USA)	7.27 s A	WR	Devynne Charlton (BAH)	7.65 s	WR
100/110 metres hurdles	Grant Holloway (USA)	12.86 s		Ackera Nugent (JAM)	12.24 s	NR
400 metres hurdles	Rai Benjamin (USA)	46.46 s		Sydney McLaughlin-Levrone (USA)	50.37 s	WR
3000 metres steeplechase	Lamecha Girma (ETH)	8:01.63		Winfred Yavi (BHR)	8:44.39	AR
10 kilometres	Yomif Kejelcha (ETH)	26:37		Agnes Ngetich (KEN)	28:46	Mx
15 kilometres	Daniel Mateiko (KEN)	40:56+		Agnes Ngetich (KEN)	44:15+	Mx
20 kilometres	Yomif Kejelcha (ETH)	54:32+		Agnes Ngetich (KEN)	59:42+	Mx
Half marathon	Yomif Kejelcha (ETH)	57:30	WR	Agnes Ngetich (KEN)	1:03:04	Mx
25 kilometres	Benson Kipruto (KEN); Timothy Kiplagat (KEN)	1:11:39+		Ruth Chepngetich (KEN)	1:16:17+	Mx
Marathon	Sabastian Sawe (KEN)	2:02:05		Ruth Chepng'etich (KEN)	2:09:56	WR
20 kilometres race walk	Koki Ikeda (JPN)	1:16:51		Elvira Chepareva (RUS)	1:24:31	
Pole vault	Armand Duplantis (SWE)	6.26 m	WR	Molly Caudery (GBR)	4.92 m	NR
High jump	Gianmarco Tamberi (ITA)	2.37 m		Yaroslava Mahuchikh (UKR)	2.10 m	WR
Long jump	Miltiadis Tentoglou (GRE)	8.65 m		Malaika Mihambo (GER)	7.22 m	
Triple jump	Jordan Díaz (ESP)	18.18 m	NR	Thea LaFond (DMA)	15.02 m	NR
Shot put	Joe Kovacs (USA)	23.13 m		Sarah Mitton (CAN)	20.68 m	NR
Discus throw	Mykolas Alekna (LIT)	74.35 m	WR	Yaime Pérez (CUB)	73.09 m	AR
Javelin throw	Arshad Nadeem (PAK)	92.97 m	AR	Flor Ruiz (COL)	66.70 m	AR
Hammer throw	Ethan Katzberg (CAN)	84.38 m	NR	Brooke Andersen (USA)	79.92 m	
Heptathlon	Simon Ehammer (SUI)	6418 pts sh	NR	Nafissatou Thiam (BEL)	6880 pts	
Decathlon	Leo Neugebauer (GER)	8961 pts	NR	—		
4 × 100 metres relay	United States; Courtney Lindsey; Kenneth Bednarek; Kyree King; Noah Lyles	37.40 s		Great Britain; Dina Asher-Smith; Imani Lansiquot; Amy Hunt; Daryll Neita	41.55 s	=NR
4 × 400 metres relay	United States; Christopher Bailey; Vernon Norwood; Bryce Deadmon; Rai Benjamin	2:54.43		United States; Shamier Little; Sydney McLaughlin-Levrone; Gabby Thomas; Alexis Holmes	3:15.27	NR

== Awards ==
=== Men ===
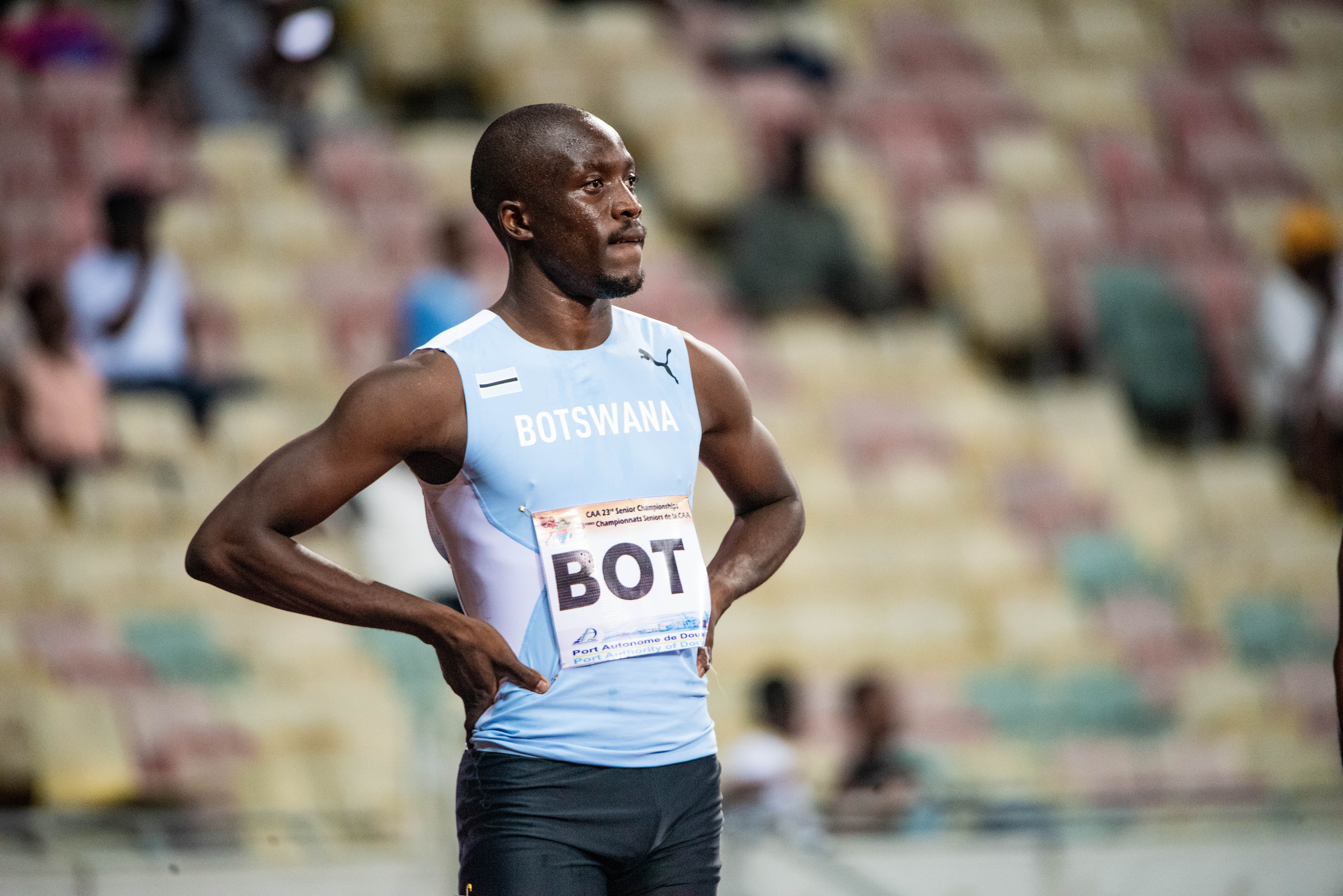
Letsile Tebogo was the World Athletics Men's Track & overall Athlete of the Year

Award	Winner
World Athletics Athlete of the Year	Letsile Tebogo (BOT)
World Athletics Track Athlete of the Year	Letsile Tebogo (BOT)
World Athletics Field Athlete of the Year	Armand Duplantis (SWE)
World Athletics Out of Stadium Athlete of the Year	Tamirat Tola (ETH)
World Athletics Rising Star	Mattia Furlani (ITA)
Track & Field News Athlete of the Year	Armand Duplantis (SWE)
European Athlete of the Year	Armand Duplantis (SWE)
European Athletics Rising Star	Niels Laros (NED)

=== Women ===
Award	Winner
World Athletics Athlete of the Year	Sifan Hassan (NED)
World Athletics Track Athlete of the Year	Sydney McLaughlin-Levrone (USA)
World Athletics Field Athlete of the Year	Yaroslava Mahuchikh (UKR)
World Athletics Out of Stadium Athlete of the Year	Sifan Hassan (NED)
World Athletics Rising Star	Sembo Almayew (ETH)
Track & Field News Athlete of the Year	Sydney McLaughlin-Levrone (USA)
European Athlete of the Year	Yaroslava Mahuchikh (UKR)
European Athletics Rising Star	Adriana Vilagoš (SRB)

== Summer Olympics ==
- August 1–11: 2024 Summer Olympics in (France) Paris

== World Championships ==
- March 1–3: 2024 World Athletics Indoor Championships in (United Kingdom) Glasgow
  - 60 metres: (United States) Christian Coleman (m) / (Saint Lucia) Julien Alfred (f)
  - 400 metres: (Belgium) Alexander Doom (m) / (Netherlands) Femke Bol (f)
  - 800 metres: (United States) Bryce Hoppel (m) / (Ethiopia) Tsige Duguma (f)
  - 1500 metres: (New Zealand) Geordie Beamish (m) / (Ethiopia) Freweyni Hailu (f)
  - 3000 metres: (United Kingdom) Josh Kerr (m) / (United States) Elle St. Pierre (f)
  - 60 metres hurdles: (United States) Grant Holloway (m) / (The Bahamas) Devynne Charlton (f)
  - 4 × 400 metres relay:Belgium (m) / Netherlands (f)
  - High jump: (New Zealand) Hamish Kerr (m) / (Australia) Nicola Olyslagers (f)
  - Pole vault: (Sweden) Armand Duplantis (m) / (United Kingdom) Molly Caudery (f)
  - Long jump: (Greece) Miltiadis Tentoglou (m) / (United States) Tara Davis-Woodhall (f)
  - Triple jump: (Burkina Faso) Hugues Fabrice Zango (m) / (Dominica) Thea Lafond (f)
  - Shot put: (United States) Ryan Crouser (m) / (Canada) Sarah Mitton (f)
  - Heptathlon: (Switzerland) Simon Ehammer (m)
  - Pentathlon: (Belgium) Noor Vidts
- March 30: 2024 World Athletics Cross Country Championships in (Serbia) Belgrade
- April 21–22: 2024 World Athletics Race Walking Team Championships in (Turkey) Antalya
- May 4–5: 2024 World Athletics Relays in (The Bahamas) Nassau
- August 26–31: 2024 World Athletics U20 Championships in (Peru) Lima

== Areas, Regional and Continental Championships ==
=== Indoor ===
- January 27–28: 2024 South American Indoor Championships in Athletics in Cochabamba
  - 60 metres: (Brazil) Felipe Bardi dos Santos (m) / (Brazil) Vitória Cristina Rosa (f)
  - 400 metres: (Argentina) Elian Larregina (m) / (Brazil) Tiffani Marinho (f)
  - 800 metres: (Venezuela) José Antonio Maita (m) / (Uruguay) María Pía Fernández (f)
  - 1500 metres: (Bolivia) David Ninavia (m) / (Peru) Anita Poma (f)
  - 3000 metres: (Bolivia) David Ninavia (m) / (Bolivia) Benita Parra (f)
  - 60 metres hurdles: (Brazil) Eduardo de Deus (m) / (Brazil) Ketiley Batista (f)
  - 4 × 400 metres relay:Venezuela (m) / Bolivia (f)
  - High jump: (Brazil) Fernando Ferreira (m) / (Brazil) Valdileia Martins (f)
  - Pole vault: (Venezuela) Ricardo Montes de Oca (m) / (Brazil) Beatriz Chagas (f)
  - Long jump: (Colombia) Arnovis Dalmero (m) / (Brazil) Lissandra Campos (f)
  - Triple jump: (Venezuela) Leodan Torrealba (m) / (Brazil) Gabriele dos Santos (f)
  - Shot put: (Brazil) Darlan Romani (m) / (Chile) Ivana Gallardo (f)
  - Heptathlon: (Brazil) José Fernando Ferreira (m)
  - Pentathlon: (Brazil) Raiane Procópio
- February 10: 2024 Balkan Athletics Indoor Championships in Istanbul
  - 60 metres: (Slovenia) Anej Čurin Prapotnik (m) / (Greece) Polyniki Emmanouilidou (f)
  - 400 metres: (Turkey) Berke Akçam (m) / (Romania) Alexandra Stefania Ută (f)
  - 800 metres: (Turkey) Ömer Faruk Bozdağ (m) / (Croatia) Nina Vuković (f)
  - 1500 metres: (Armenia) Yervand Mkrtchyan (m) / (Albania) Luiza Gega (f)
  - 3000 metres: (Serbia) Elzan Bibić (m) / (Albania) Luiza Gega (f)
  - 60 metres hurdles: (Slovenia) Filip Jakob Demšar (m) / (Slovenia) Nika Glojnarič (f)
  - 4 × 400 metres relay:Turkey (m) / Turkey (f)
  - High jump: (Ukraine) Dmytro Nikitin (m) / (Bulgaria) Mirela Demireva (f)
  - Pole vault: (Greece) Ioannis Rizos (m) / (Ukraine) Yana Hladiychuk (f)
  - Long jump: (Croatia) Luka Ćurković (m) / (Romania) Florentina Iusco (f)
  - Triple jump: (Turkey) Can Özüpek (m) / (Romania) Elena Andreea Taloş (f)
  - Shot put: (Bosnia and Herzegovina) Mesud Pezer (m) / (Moldova) Dimitriana Bezede (f)
- February 17–19: 2024 Asian Indoor Athletics Championships in (Iran) Tehran
  - 60 metres: (Oman) Ali Anwar Ali Al Balushi (m) / (Iran) Farzaneh Fasihi (f)
  - 400 metres: (Iran) Sajad Aghaei (m) / (Japan) Nanako Matsumoto (f)
  - 800 metres: (Kuwait) Ebrahim Al-Zofairi (m) / (Iran) Toktam Dastarbandan (f)
  - 1500 metres: (Kyrgyzstan) Nursultan Keneshbekov (m) / (India) Harmilan Bains (f)
  - 3000 metres: (Kyrgyzstan) Nursultan Keneshbekov (m) / (Japan) Yuma Yamamoto (f)
  - 60 metres hurdles: (Kazakhstan) David Yefremov (m) / (India) Jyothi Yarraji (f)
  - 4 × 400 metres relay: Kazakhstan (m) / Kazakhstan (f)
  - High jump: (Japan) Ryoichi Akamatsu (m) / (Kazakhstan) Yelizaveta Matveyeva (f)
  - Pole vault: (China) Zhong Tao (m) / (China) Li Ling (f)
  - Long jump: (China) Zhang Mingkun (m) / (China) Xiong Shiqi (f)
  - Triple jump: (China) Su Wen (m) / (China) Chen Jie (f)
  - Shot put: (India) Tajinderpal Singh Toor (m) / (China) Sun Yue (f)
  - Heptathlon: (Japan) Yuma Maruyama (m)
  - Pentathlon: (China) Zheng Ninali

=== Outdoor ===
- March 18–22: 2023 African Games in (Ghana) Accra
  - 100 metres: (Cameroon) Emmanuel Eseme (m) / (The Gambia) Gina Bass (f)
  - 200 metres: (Ghana) Joseph Amoah (m) / (The Gambia) Gina Bass (f)
  - 400 metres: (Nigeria) Chidi Okezie (m) / (Kenya) Mary Moraa (f)
  - 800 metres: (Kenya) Aaron Cheminingwa (m) / (Ethiopia) Tsige Duguma (f)
  - 1500 metres: (Kenya) Brian Komen (m) / (Ethiopia) Hirut Meshesha (f)
  - 5000 metres: (Ethiopia) Hagos Gebrhiwet (m) / (Ethiopia) Medina Eisa (f)
  - 10,000 metres: (Ethiopia) Nibret Melak (m) / (Kenya) Janeth Chepngetich (f)
  - 110 metres hurdles: (Senegal) Louis François Mendy (m) / (Nigeria) Tobi Amusan (f)
  - 400 metres hurdles: (Morocco) Saad Hinti (m) / (South Africa) Rogail Joseph (f)
  - 3000 metres steeplechase: (Ethiopia) Samuel Firewu (m) / (Kenya) Beatrice Chepkoech (f)
  - 4 × 100 metres relay:Nigeria (m) / Nigeria (f)
  - 4 × 400 metres relay:Zambia (m) / Nigeria (f) / Nigeria (mixed)
  - 20 kilometres walk: (Ethiopia) Misgana Wakuma (m) / (Kenya) Emily Wamusyi Ngii (f)
  - Half marathon: (Eritrea) Samsom Amare (m) / (South Sudan) Atalena Loliha (f)
  - High jump: (Ghana) Evans Yamoah (m) / (Ghana) Rose Amoanimaa Yeboah (f)
  - Pole vault: (Algeria) Mehdi Amar Rouana (m) / (South Africa) Miré Reinstorf (f)
  - Long jump: (South Africa) Asande Mthembu (m) / (Nigeria) Ese Brume (f)
  - Triple jump: (Burkina Faso) Hugues Fabrice Zango (m) / (Nigeria) Ruth Usoro (f)
  - Shot put: (Nigeria) Chukwuebuka Enekwechi (m) / (South Africa) Ashley Erasmus (f)
  - Discus throw: (South Africa) Victor Hogan (m) / (Nigeria) Obiageri Amaechi (f)
  - Hammer throw: (Egypt) Mostafa El Gamel (m) / (Algeria) Zahra Tatar (f)
  - Javelin throw: (Nigeria) Nnamdi Chinecherem (m) / (South Africa) Jo-Ane van Dyk (f)
  - Decathlon: (South Africa) Fredriech Pretorius (m)
  - Heptathlon: (Benin) Odile Ahouanwanou
- April 24–27: 2024 Asian U20 Athletics Championships in (United Arab Emirates) Dubai
- May 10–12: 2024 Ibero-American Championships in Athletics in (Brazil) Cuiabá
- May 11 & 12: 2024 Central Asia Open Championships in Athletics in (Uzbekistan) Tashkent
- May 14–16: 2024 West Asian Championships in Athletics in (Iraq) Baghdad
- May 18 & 19: 2024 Nordic Senior Championships in Athletics in (Sweden) Malmö
- May 25 & 26: 2024 Balkan Championships in Athletics in (Turkey) İzmir
- June 1: 2024 Championships of the Small States of Europe in Gibraltar
- June 1–8: 2024 Oceania U18 Athletics Championships in (Fiji) Suva
- June 4–8: 2024 Oceania Athletics Championships in (Fiji) Suva
- June 7–9: 2024 NACAC Championships in (El Salvador) San Salvador
- June 7–12: 2024 European Athletics Championships in (Italy) Rome
- June 19–23: 2024 Micronesian Games in (Marshall Islands) Majuro
- June : 2024 African Championships in Athletics in (Cameroon) Yaoundé
- July 18–21: 2024 European Athletics U18 Championships in (Slovakia) Banská Bystrica
- October 4–6: 2024 SAAF Athletics Championships in (India) Ranchi

Race walking

- March 9: 2024 Balkan Race Walking Championships in (Turkey) Antalya
  - 20 km winners: (Greece) Alexandros Papamichail (m) / (Greece) Kyriaki Filtisakou (f)
  - Men's 35 km winner: (Bulgaria) Martin Gramatikov
- March 10: 2024 South American Race Walking Championships in (Brazil) Recife
  - 20 km winners: (Brazil) Caio Bonfim (m) / (Colombia) Lucy Mendoza (f)
  - 35 km winners: (Brazil) Diego Pereira Lima (m) / (Brazil) Viviane Lyra (f)
- March 17: 2024 Asian Race Walking Championships (20 km) in (Japan) Nomi
  - 20 km winners: (Japan) Hayato Katsuki (m) / (Japan) Hitomi Shimoka (f)

Road running

- April 14: 2024 Montenegro Half Marathon Championships in Nikšić
- May 26: 2024 South American Half Marathon Championships in (Paraguay) Asunción

Cross country

- February 17 & 18: 2024 FISU Cross Country Championships in (Oman) Muscat
  - Winners: (Uganda) Seth Akampa (m) / (South Africa) Karabo Mailula (f)
- December 8: 2024 European Cross Country Championships in (Turkey) Antalya

== 2024 Diamond League ==
- April 20: Diamond League Xiamen in (China) Xiamen
- April 27: Diamond League Shanghai in (China) Shanghai
- May 10: Doha Diamond League in (Qatar) Doha
- May 19: Meeting International Mohammed VI d'Athlétisme de Rabat in (Morocco) Rabat
- May 25: Prefontaine Classic in (United States) Eugene, Oregon
- May 30: Bislett Games in (Norway) Oslo
- June 2: BAUHAUS-galan in (Sweden) Stockholm
- July 7: Meeting de Paris in (France) Paris
- July 12: Herculis in (Monaco) Fontvieille
- July 20: Anniversary Games in (United Kingdom) London
- August 22: Athletissima in (Switzerland) Lausanne
- August 25: Kamila Skolimowska Memorial in (Poland) Chorzów
- August 29: Golden Gala in (Italy) Rome
- September 5: Weltklasse Zürich in (Switzerland) Zürich
- September 13 & 14: Memorial Van Damme (final) in (Belgium) Brussels

== 2024 World Athletics Indoor Tour ==
Gold

- January 27: Astana Indoor Meet for Amin Tuyakov Prizes in (Kazakhstan) Astana
  - 60 m: (United States) Demek Kemp (m)/ (The Bahamas) Anthonique Strachan (f)
  - 400 m: (Spain) Iñaki Cañal (m)/ (Portugal) Cátia Azevedo (f)
  - Women's mile: (Ethiopia) Diribe Welteji
  - Men's 3000 m: (Ethiopia) Samuel Tefera
  - 60 m hurdles: (China) Junxi Liu (m) / (Nigeria) Tobi Amusan (f)
  - Men's pole vault: (Sweden) Armand Duplantis
  - Men's shot put: (United Kingdom) Scott Lincoln
  - Women's high jump: (Lithuania) Urtė Baikštytė
  - Women's long jump: (Serbia) Milica Gardašević
- January 30: Czech Indoor Gala in (Czech Republic) Ostrava
  - 60 m: (Japan) Yoshihide Kiryū (m) / (Poland) Ewa Swoboda (f)
  - 800 m: (Botswana) Tshepiso Masalela (m) / (Czech Republic) Hana Kielarová (f)
  - Women's mile: (Ethiopia) Freweyni Hailu (f)
  - 1500 m: (Portugal) Isaac Nader (m) / (Ethiopia) Freweyni Hailu (f)
  - 60 m hurdles: (Czech Republic) Stephan Schubert (m) / (Poland) Pia Skrzyszowska (f)
  - Pole vault: (Czech Republic) Ladislav Sedláček (m) / (Slovenia) Tina Šutej (f)
  - Long jump: (Greece) Miltiadis Tendoglou (m) / (Czech Republic) Tereza Vokálová
  - Women's triple jump: (Czech Republic) Veronika Skalická
  - Men's shot put: (United States) Roger Steen
- February 4: New Balance Indoor Grand Prix in (United States) Boston
  - 60 m: (United States) Noah Lyles (m) / (United States) Mikiah Brisco (f)
  - Women's 300 m: (United States) Gabrielle Thomas
  - 400 m: (United States) Vernon Norwood (m) / (United States) Kendall Ellis (f)
  - Men's 600 m: (Republic of Ireland) Mark English
  - Women's 800 m: (United States) Samantha Watson (f)
  - Men's 1000 m: (Canada) Marco Arop
  - 1500 m: (United States) Hobbs Kessler (m) / (Ethiopia) Gudaf Tsegay (f)
  - 3000 m: (Ethiopia) Lamecha Girma (m) / (Australia) Jessica Hull (f)
  - 60 m hurdles: (United States) Grant Holloway (m) / (United States) Tia Jones (f)
  - Long jump: (Jamaica) Carey McLeod (m) / (United States) Tara Davis-Woodhall (f)
- February 6: Copernicus Cup in (Poland) Toruń
  - 60 m: (United Kingdom) Jeremiah Azu (m) / (Poland) Ewa Swoboda (f)
  - Women's 400 m: (Netherlands) Lieke Klaver
  - 800 m: (Botswana) Tshepiso Masalela (m) / (Ethiopia) Habitam Alemu (f)
  - 1500 m: (Ethiopia) Samuel Tefera (m) / (Ethiopia) Freweyni Hailu (f)
  - Men's 3000 m: (Ethiopia) Selemon Barega
  - 60 m hurdles: (Poland) Jakub Szymański (m) / (Netherlands) Nadine Visser (f)
  - Men's pole vault: (Poland) Piotr Lisek
  - Men's triple jump: (Italy) Andy Díaz
- February 10: Meeting Hauts-de-France Pas-de-Calais in Liévin
  - Men's 200 m: (United States) Erriyon Knighton
  - Women's 400 m: (Netherlands) Femke Bol
  - 800 m: (Belgium) Eliott Crestan (m) / (United Kingdom) Jemma Reekie (f)
  - 1500 m: (France) Azeddine Habz (m) / (Ethiopia) Freweyni Hailu (f)
  - Men's 2000 m: (Ethiopia) Lamecha Girma
  - 3000 m: (Ethiopia) Selemon Barega (m) / (Ethiopia) Gudaf Tsegay (f)
  - 60 m hurdles: (United States) Grant Holloway (m) / (Nigeria) Tobi Amusan (f)
  - Pole vault: (United States) Sam Kendricks (m) / (New Zealand) Eliza McCartney (f)
  - Men's triple jump: (Burkina Faso) Hugues Fabrice Zango
  - Men's shot put: (Italy) Leonardo Fabbri
- February 11: Millrose Games in (United States) New York City
  - 60 m: (United States) Christian Coleman (m) / (Saint Lucia) Julien Alfred (f)
  - Women's 300 m: (United States) Talitha Diggs
  - 800 m: (United States) Bryce Hoppel (m) / (United States) Allie Wilson (f)
  - Mile: (United States) Yared Nuguse (m) / (United States) Elle Purrier St. Pierre (f)
  - 2 miles: (United Kingdom) Josh Kerr (m) / (United Kingdom) Laura Muir (f)
  - 60 m hurdles: (United States) Dylan Beard (m) / (The Bahamas) Devynne Charlton (f)
  - Men's pole vault: (United States) Chris Nilsen
  - Women's high jump: (Ukraine) Yaroslava Mahuchikh
- February 23: World Indoor Tour Madrid in (Spain) Madrid
  - Women's 400 m: (Romania) Andrea Miklós
  - 800 m: (Italy) Catalin Tecuceanu (m) / (Ethiopia) Worknesh Mesele (f)
  - Women's 1500 m: (Italy) Ludovica Cavalli
  - Men's 3000 m: (Norway) Narve Gilje Nordås
  - 60 m hurdles: (Italy) Lorenzo Simonelli (m) / (The Bahamas) Devynne Charlton (f)
  - Men's pole vault: (Poland) Piotr Lisek
  - Men's triple jump: (Spain) Jordan Díaz
  - Men's shot put: (Jamaica) Rajindra Campbell
  - Women's high jump: (Slovenia) Lia Apostolovski
  - Women's long jump: (Romania) Florentina Iușco

Silver

- January 28: Meeting de L'Eure in (France) Val-de-Reuil
  - Women's 800 m winner: (Benin) Noélie Yarigo
  - Men's mile winner: (Spain) Mohamed Katir
  - 3000 m winners: (Kenya) Kyumbe Munguti (m) / (United Kingdom) Georgia Bell (f)
  - 60 m hurdles winners: (Spain) Asier Martínez (m) / (Finland) Nooralotta Neziri (f)
  - Women's pole vault winner: (United Kingdom) Molly Caudery
  - High jump winners: (Czech Republic) Jan Štefela (m) / (United Kingdom) Morgan Lake (f)
  - Men's triple jump winner: (Burkina Faso) Hugues Fabrice Zango
  - Women's shot put winner: (Canada) Sarah Mitton
- February 2: Elite Indoor Track Miramas Meeting in (France) Miramas
  - Men's 60 m winner: (Kenya) Ferdinand Omanyala
  - 400 m winners: (France) Yann Spillmann (m) / (Canada) Zoe Sherar (f)
  - 1500 m winners: (South Africa) Ryan Mphahlele (m) / (France) Agathe Guillemot (f)
  - 60 m hurdles winners: (France) Wilhem Belocian (m) / (United States) Amber Hughes (f)
  - Men's pole vault winner: (France) Robin Emig
  - Men's triple jump winner: (Italy) Andy Díaz
  - Men's shot put winner: (United Kingdom) Scott Lincoln
  - Women's high jump winner: (Greece) Tatiana Gusin
- February 3: Metz Meeting Moselle Athlélor in (France) Metz
  - 200 m winners: (Israel) Blessing Afrifah (m) / (Netherlands) Femke Bol (f)
  - 400 m winners: (Belgium) Alexander Doom (m) / (Netherlands) Femke Bol (f)
  - Men's 600 m winner: (France) Benjamin Robert
  - 800 m winners: (Botswana) Tshepiso Masalela (m) / (Uganda) Halimah Nakaayi (f)
  - Men's 1500 m winner: (Kenya) Vincent Kibet Keter
  - 3000 m winners: (France) Yann Schrub (m) / (Ethiopia) Hirut Meshesha (f)
  - 60 m hurdles winners: (Jamaica) Damion Thomas (m) / (France) Judy Chalcou (f)
  - Men's pole vault winner: (United States) Chris Nilsen
  - Women's triple jump winner: (Cuba) Leyanis Pérez
- February 4: ISTAF Indoor Meeting in (Germany) Düsseldorf
  - 60 m winners: (Liberia) Emmanuel Matadi (m) / (Jamaica) Shashalee Forbes (f)
  - 60 m hurdles winners: (Poland) Jakub Szymański (m) / (United States) Amber Hughes (f)
  - Men's pole vault winner: (Poland) Piotr Lisek
  - Women's long jump winner: (Germany) Mikaelle Assani
- February 6: Mondo Classic in (Sweden) Uppsala
  - Men's pole vault winner: (Sweden) Armand Duplantis
- February 7: Beskydská laťka in (Czech Republic) Třinec
  - High jump winners: (Czech Republic) Jan Štefela (m) / (Greece) Tatiana Gusin (f)
- February 7: Mondeville Meeting in (France) Mondeville
  - 60 m winners: (Liberia) Emmanuel Matadi (m) / (France) Orlann Oliere & (Hungary) Boglárka Takács (f)
  - 3000 m winners: (United Kingdom) James Gormley (m) / (Italy) Giulia Aprile (f)
  - 60 m hurdles winners: (Jamaica) Damion Thomas (m) / (The Bahamas) Charisma Taylor (f)
  - Pole vault winners: (United States) Jacob Wooten (m) / (Canada) Alysha Newman (f)
  - Men's long jump winner: (France) Erwan Konaté
  - Women's triple jump winner: (Cuba) Leyanis Pérez
- February 9: Meeting Indoor de Lyon in (France) Lyon
  - Men's 400 m winners: (Hungary) Attila Molnár
  - 800 m winners: (Morocco) Abdelati El Guesse (m) / (Ethiopia) Tigist Girma (f)
  - 1500 m winners: (Italy) Ossama Meslek (m) / (Italy) Marta Zenoni (f)
  - 3000 m winners: (Ethiopia) Milkesa Fikadu (m) / (France) Sarah Madeleine (f)
  - 60 m hurdles winners: (Finland) Elmo Lakka (m) / (Spain) Xènia Benach (f)
  - Men's long jump winner: (Germany) Simon Batz
  - Women's triple jump winner: (Turkey) Tuğba Danışmaz
- February 10: Hustopečské skákání in (Czech Republic) Hustopeče
  - High jump winners: (United States) Shelby McEwen (m) / (Greece) Tatiana Gusin (f)
- February 11: Meeting de Paris Indoor in (France) Paris
  - 60 m winners: (Kenya) Ferdinand Omanyala (m) / (Luxembourg) Patrizia van der Weken (f)
  - 60 m hurdles winners: (Switzerland) Jason Joseph (m) / (The Bahamas) Charisma Taylor (f)
  - Men's pole vault winner: (United States) Jacob Wooten
  - Long jump winners: (Greece) Miltiadis Tentoglou (m) / (Spain) Fátima Diame (f)
- February 13: Banskobystrická latka in (Slovakia) Banská Bystrica
  - High jump winners: (South Korea) Woo Sang-hyeok (m) / (Serbia) Angelina Topić (f)
- February 9: Belgrade Indoor Meeting in (Serbia) Belgrade
  - 60 m winners: (Liberia) Emmanuel Matadi (m) / (Jamaica) Christania Williams (f)
  - 400 m winners: (Switzerland) Lionel Spitz (m) / (Romania) Andrea Miklós (f)
  - Women's 800 m winner: (Ethiopia) Tsige Duguma
  - Men's 1500 m winner: (South Africa) Ryan Mphahlele
  - 60 m hurdles winners: (Austria) Enzo Diessl (m) / (Hungary) Gréta Kerekes (f)
  - Men's pole vault winner: (Czech Republic) David Holý
  - Long jump winner: (Serbia) Strahinja Jovančević (m) / (Italy) Larissa Iapichino (f)
  - Men's shot put winner: (New Zealand) Tom Walsh
  - Women's high jump winner: (Ukraine) Yuliya Chumachenko
- February 20: Hvězdy v Nehvizdech in (Czech Republic) Nehvizdy
  - Men's high jump winner: (South Korea) Woo Sang-hyeok
  - Shot put winners: (New Zealand) Tom Walsh (m) / (Canada) Sarah Mitton (f)
- February 23: ISTAF Indoor in (Germany) Berlin
  - 60 m winners: (Cameroon) Emmanuel Eseme (m) / (Italy) Zaynab Dosso (f)
  - 60 m hurdles winners: (United States) Daniel Roberts (m) / (Hungary) Gréta Kerekes (f)
  - Men's pole vault winner: (Philippines) Ernest John Obiena
  - Women's long jump winner: (Germany) Malaika Mihambo
  - Discus throw winner: (Czech Republic) Kristjan Čeh (m) / (Netherlands) Jorinde van Klinken (f)
- February 24: Perche Elite Tour Rouen in (France) Rouen
  - Pole vault winner: (United States) Sam Kendricks (m) / (United Kingdom) Molly Caudery (f)

Bronze

- January 20: Jablonec Indoor in (Czech Republic) Jablonec nad Jizerou
  - 60 m winners: (Turkey) Kayhan Özer (m)/ (Poland) Magdalena Stefanowicz (f)
  - Men's shot put winner: (Egypt) Mohamed Magdi Hamza
- January 20: Sparkassen Indoor Meeting Dortmund in (Germany) Dortmund
  - 60 m winners: (Germany) Joshua Hartmann (m)/ (Czech Republic) Karolína Maňasová (f)
  - 400 m winners: (Serbia) Boško Kijanović (m) / (Italy) Alice Mangione (f)
  - 800 m winners: (Germany) Robert Farken (m) / (Germany) Jana Marie Becker (f)
  - 1500 m winners: (Germany) Marius Probst (m) / (United Kingdom) Georgia Bell (f)
  - Men's 60 m hurdles winner: (Kuwait) Yaqoub Al-Youha
  - Men's pole vault winner: (Turkey) Ersu Şaşma
  - Women's long jump winner: (Germany) Laura Raquel Müller
- January 20: International Athletics Tournament - Olga Rypakova Prizes in (Kazakhstan) Ust-Kamenogorsk
  - 60 m winners: (Kazakhstan) Almat Tulebaev (m)/ (Kazakhstan) Olga Safronova (f)
  - 400 m winners: (Kazakhstan) Yefim Tarassov (m) / (Uzbekistan) Laylo Allaberganova (f)
  - Women's 800 m winner: (Kazakhstan) Anastasiya Tsvirkunova
  - Men's 1500 m winner: (Kyrgyzstan) Nursultan Keneshbekov
  - 60 m hurdles winners: (Kazakhstan) David Yefremov (m) / (Uzbekistan) Lidiya Podtsepkina (f)
  - Men's triple jump winner: (Ukraine) Maksym Vanyaikin
  - Women's high jump winner: (Kazakhstan) Nadezhda Dubovitskaya
  - Women's long jump winner: (Kazakhstan) Alina Chistyakova
- January 21: CMCM Indoor Meeting in Luxembourg
  - Women's 60 m winner: (Luxembourg) Patrizia van der Weken
  - Men's 200 m winner: (Poland) Albert Komański
  - Women's 800 m winner: (Kenya) Naomi Korir
  - 1500 m winners: (Portugal) Isaac Nader (m) / (Belgium) Elise Vanderelst (f)
  - Men's 3000 m winner: (Netherlands) Mahadi Abdi Ali
  - 60 m hurdles winners: (Belgium) Elie Bacari (m) / (United States) Amber Hughes (f)
  - Men's high jump winner: (Greece) Antonios Merlos
  - Men's shot put winner: (Luxembourg) Bob Bertemes
  - Women's pole vault winner: (Switzerland) Angelica Moser
  - Women's long jump winner: (Bulgaria) Plamena Mitkova
- January 23: Aarhus Sprint'n'Jump in (Denmark) Aarhus
  - 60 m winners: (Denmark) Simon Hansen (m)/ (Portugal) Rosalina Santos (f)
  - 60 m hurdles winners: (Sweden) Max Hrelja (m) / (Denmark) Mette Graversgaard (f)
  - Long jump winners: (Republic of Ireland) Reece Ademola (m) / (Iceland) Irma Gunnarsdóttir (f)
  - Triple jump winners: (Germany) Max Heß (m) / (Finland) Senni Salminen (f)
- January 23: Tampere Indoor Meeting in (Finland) Tampere
  - 60 m winners: (United Kingdom) David Morgan-Harrison (m) / (Estonia) Õilme Võro (f)
  - 800 m winners: (Norway) Ole Jakob Solbu (m) / (Finland) Veera Mattila (f)
  - 60 m hurdles winners: (Finland) Elmo Lakka (m) / (Finland) Nooralotta Neziri (f)
  - Men's pole vault winner: (Finland) Urho Kujanpää
  - Women's high jump winner: (Estonia) Elisabeth Pihela
  - Long jump winners: (Republic of Ireland) Reece Ademola (m) / (Finland) Jessica Kähärä (f)
  - Men's triple jump winner: (Finland) Simo Lipsanen

== 2024 World Athletics Continental Tour ==
Gold

- January 15: Maurie Plant Meet in (Australia) Melbourne
  - Women's 100 m winner: (New Zealand) Zoe Hobbs
  - Men's 200 m winner: (Australia) Rohan Browning
  - Women's 800 m winner: (Australia) Claudia Hollingsworth
  - Men's mile winner: (Australia) Stewart McSweyn
  - 5000 m winners: (Australia) Jack Rayner (m) / (Australia) Rose Davies (f)
  - Women's 100 m hurdles winner: (Australia) Liz Clay
  - Men's 110 m hurdles winner: (Australia) Tayleb Willis
  - High jump winners: (New Zealand) Hamish Kerr (m) / (Australia) Nicola Olyslagers (f)
  - Men's long jump winner: (Australia) Chris Mitrevski
  - Discus throw winners: (New Zealand) Connor Bell (m) / (Italy) Daisy Osakue (f)
  - Women's javelin throw winner: (Australia) Kathryn Mitchell
- April 20: Kip Keino Classic in (Kenya) Nairobi
  - 100 m winners: (United States) Kenneth Bednarek (m) / (The Gambia) Gina Bass (f)
  - Men's 200 m winners: (United States) Courtney Lindsey
  - 400 m winners: (Botswana) Bayapo Ndori (m) / (Bahrain) Kemi Adekoya (f)
  - 800 m winners: (Kenya) Emmanuel Wanyonyi (m) / (Kenya) Mary Moraa (f)
  - 1500 m winners: (Kenya) Reynold Kipkorir Cheruiyot (m) / (Kenya) Mary Ekiru (f)
  - 5000 m winners: (Ethiopia) Abdisa Fayisa (m) / (Ethiopia) Marta Alemayo (f)
  - Women's 400 m hurdles winner: (Norway) Amalie Iuel (f)
  - 3000 m steeplechase winners: (Kenya) Abraham Kibiwot (m) / (Romania) Stella Rutto (f)
  - Hammer throw winners: (Canada) Ethan Katzberg (m) / (United States) Janee' Kassanavoid (f)
  - Men's javelin throw winner: (Latvia) Gatis Čakšs
  - Women's high jump winner: (Czech Republic) Michaela Hrubá
- May 18: Los Angeles Grand Prix in (United States) Los Angeles
  - 100 m winners: (United States) Kyree King (m) / (United States) Melissa Jefferson (f)
  - Women's 200 m winner: (United States) Sydney McLaughlin
  - 400 m winner: (United States) Michael Norman (m) / (Dominican Republic) Marileidy Paulino (f)
  - 800 m winner: (United States) Bryce Hoppel (m) / (Uganda) Halimah Nakaayi (f)
  - 1500 m winner: (United States) Oliver Hoare (m) / (Ethiopia) Diribe Welteji (f)
  - 5000 m winners: (Ethiopia) Selemon Barega (m) / (United States) Elle St. Pierre (f)
  - Women's 100 m hurdles winner: (United States) Tonea Marshall
  - Women's triple jump winner: (Jamaica) Thea Lafond
  - Pole vault winners: (Philippines) Ernest John Obiena (m) / (United States) Sandi Morris (f)
  - Discus throw winners: (Jamaica) Roje Stona (m) / (United States) Valarie Allman (f)
  - Men's shot put winner: (United States) Joe Kovacs
  - Hammer throw winners: (Ukraine) Mykhaylo Kokhan (m) / (United States) Brooke Andersen (f)
- May 19: Seiko Golden Grand Prix in (Japan) Tokyo
- May 28: Ostrava Golden Spike in (Czech Republic) Ostrava
- June 9: New York City Grand Prix in (United States) New York City
- June 18: Paavo Nurmi Games in (Finland) Turku
- June 21: Irena Szewinska Memorial in (Poland) Bydgoszcz
  - Women's 100 m winner: (New Zealand) Zoe Hobbs
  - Men's 800 m winner: (Sweden) Andreas Kramer
  - Women's 400 m winner: (Poland) Natalia Kaczmarek
  - 1500 winners: (Italy) Federico Riva (m) / (Ethiopia) Freweyni Hailu (f)
  - Women's 100 m hurdles winner: (Republic of Ireland) Sarah Lavin
  - Men's 110 m hurdles winner: (Cyprus) Milan Trajković
  - 400 m hurdles winners: (Brazil) Matheus Lima (m) / (Czech Republic) Nikoleta Jíchová (f)
  - Men's shot put winner: (Italy) Leonardo Fabbri
  - Women's throw winner: (Poland) Paweł Fajdek
  - Men's pole vault winner: (Philippines) Ernest John Obiena
- July 7: Fanny Blankers-Koen Games in (Netherlands) Hengelo
- July 9: Gyulai István Memorial in (Hungary) Székesfehérvár
- September 8: Memorial Borisa Hanžekovića in (Croatia) Zagreb

== 2024 World Athletics Label Road Races ==
=== Elite Platinum ===
- January 7: C&D Xiamen Marathon in (China) Xiamen
  - Winners: (Ethiopia) Asefa Boki (m) / (Ethiopia) Bekelech Gudeta (f)
- January 28: Osaka Women's Marathon in (Japan) Osaka
  - Winner: (Ethiopia) Workenesh Edesa
- March 3: Tokyo Marathon in (Japan) Tokyo
  - Winners: (Kenya) Benson Kipruto (m) / (Ethiopia) Sutume Kebede (f)
- March 10: Nagoya Women's Marathon in (Japan) Nagoya
  - Winner: (Japan) Yuka Ando
- March 17: Seoul Marathon in (South Korea) Seoul
  - Winners: (Ethiopia) Jemal Yimer Mekonnen (m) / (Ethiopia) Fikrte Wereta (f)
- April 15: Boston Marathon in (United States) Boston
  - Winners: (Ethiopia) Sisay Lemma (m) / (Kenya) Hellen Obiri (f)
- September 15: Sydney Marathon in (Australia) Sydney
  - Winners: (Kenya) Brimin Kipkorir (m) / (Ethiopia) Workenesh Edesa (f)
- September 29: Berlin Marathon in (Germany) Berlin
  - Winners: (Ethiopia) Milkesa Mengesha (m) / (Ethiopia) Tigist Ketema (f)
- October 13: Chicago Marathon in (United States) Chicago
  - Winners: (Kenya) John Korir (m) / (Kenya) Ruth Chepng'etich (f)
- November 3: New York City Marathon in (United States) New York City
  - Winners: (Netherlands) Abdi Nageeye (m) / (Kenya) Sheila Chepkirui (f)
- December 1: Valencia Marathon in (Spain) Valencia
- December 1: Shanghai Marathon in (China) Shanghai

=== Category A ===
- January 14: Chevron Houston Marathon in (United States) Houston
  - Winners: (Morocco) Zouhair Talbi (m) / (Ethiopia) Rahma Tusa (f)
- January 21: Hong Kong Marathon in Hong Kong
  - Winners: (Kenya) Anderson Seroi (m) / (Ethiopia) Medina Armino (f)
- January 21: Mumbai Marathon in (India) Mumbai
  - Winners: (Ethiopia) Lemi Berhanu Hayle (m) / (Ethiopia) Abersh Minsewo (f)
- January 27: Buriram Marathon in (Thailand) Buriram
  - Winners: (Kenya) Mathew Samperu (m) / (Kenya) Sharon Chelimo (f)
- February 10: Lagos City Marathon in (Nigeria) Lagos
  - Winners: (Kenya) Bernard Sang (m) / (Ethiopia) Kebene Chala (f)
- February 16: Doha Marathon in (Qatar) Doha
  - Winners: (Uganda) Solomon Mutai (m) / (Kenya) Valary Jemeli Aiyabei (f)
- February 25: Maratón Guadalajara in (Mexico) Guadalajara
  - Half marathon winners: (Kenya) Stephen Kiprop (m) / (Ethiopia) Aberu Ayana (f)
- February 25: Osaka Marathon in (Japan) Osaka
  - Winners: (Japan) Kiyoto Hirabayashi (m) / (Ethiopia) Waganesh Mekasha (f)
- March 10: Zurich Marató Barcelona in (Spain) Barcelona
  - Winners: (Switzerland) Tadesse Abraham (m) / (Ethiopia) Degitu Azimeraw (f)
- March 17: New Taipei City Wan Jin Shi Marathon in (Chinese Taipei) Taipei
  - Winners: (Kenya) Cyrus Mutai (m) / (Ethiopia) Fozya Jemal (f)
- March 24: Chang'an Automobile Chongqing Marathon in (China) Chongqing
  - Winners: (Kenya) Josphat Boit (m) / (Tanzania) Jackline Sakilu (f)
- March 24: Wuxi Marathon in (China) Wuxi
  - Winners: (Ethiopia) Tadu Abate (m) / (Kenya) Veronica Maina (f)
- April 7: Daegu Marathon in (South Korea) Daegu
  - Winners: (Kenya) Stephen Kiprop (m) / (Ethiopia) Ruti Aga (f)
- April 14: Rotterdam Marathon in (Netherlands) Rotterdam
  - Winners: (Netherlands) Abdi Nageeye (m) / (Ethiopia) Ashete Bekere (f)
- May 26: Lanzhou Marathon in (China) Lanzhou
  - Winners: (Ethiopia) Afewerk Mesfin (m) / (Kenya) Magdalyne Masai (f)
- August 25: Mexico City Marathon in Mexico City
  - Winners: (Kenya) Edwin Kiptoo (m) / (Kenya) Fancy Chemutai (f)
- September 22: Taiyuan Marathon in (China) Taiyuan
  - Winners: (Ethiopia) Desalegn Girma (m) / (Ethiopia) Chimdesa Kumsa (f)
- September 22: Hengshui Lake Marathon in (China) Hengshui
  - Winners: (Kenya) Benard Kipkorir (m) / (Ethiopia) Atalel Anmut (f)
- October 20: Yellow River Estuary Marathon in (China) Dongying
  - Winners: (Kenya) Cornelius Kibet (m) / (Ethiopia) Meseret Abebayahau (f)
- October 20: Ljubljana Marathon in (Slovenia) Ljubljana
  - Winners: (Ethiopia) Getaneh Molla (m) / (Kenya) Joyce Chepkemoi Tele (f)
- October 20: Changsha Half Marathon in (China) Changsha
  - Half marathon winners: (China) Jinzhi Jiang (m) / (China) Lamu Yangzeng (f)
- October 27: Chengdu Marathon in (China) Chengdu
  - Winners: (Ethiopia) Yihunilign Adane (m) / (Bahrain) Rose Chelimo (f)
- October 27: Beijing Marathon in (China) Beijing
  - Winners: (Ethiopia) Lemi Berhanu (m) / (Kenya) Vicoty Chepngeno (f)
- November 3: Hangzhou International Marathon in (China) Hangzhou
  - Women's marathon winner: (Kenya) Helah Jelagat Kiprop
- November 3: Istanbul Marathon in (Turkey) Istanbul
  - Winners: (Ethiopia) Dejene Debela (m) / (Bahrain) Ruth Jebet (f)
- December 1: Singapore Marathon in Singapore
- December 1: Shenzhen Marathon in (China) Shenzhen
- December 8: Guangzhou Marathon in (China) Guangzhou
- December 15: Bangsaen21 Half Marathon in (Thailand) Chonburi
- December 15: Taipei Marathon in (Chinese Taipei) Taipei

== 2024 World Athletics Combined Events Tour ==
=== Gold ===
- April 27 & 28: Multistars in (Italy) Brescia
  - Men's heptathlon winner: (Belgium) Jente Hauttekeete
  - Women's pentathlon winner: (United States) Taliyah Brooks
- May 11 & 12: Meeting Arona Pruebas Combinadas in (Spain) Arona
  - Men's decathlon winner: (Germany) Malik Diakité
  - Women's heptathlon winner: (France) Elisa Pineau
- May 18 & 19: Hypo-Meeting in (Austria) Götzis
  - Men's decathlon winner: (Canada) Damian Warner
  - Women's heptathlon winner: (Netherlands) Anouk Vetter
- June 22 & 23: Mehrkampf-Meeting Ratingen in (Germany) Ratingen
  - Men's decathlon winner: (Germany) Till Steinforth
  - Women's heptathlon winner: (Germany) Sandrina Sprengel
- August 31 - September 1: Wiesław Czapiewski Memorial in (Poland) Nakło nad Notecią
- September 14 & 15: Décastar in (France) Talence

=== Silver ===
- January 27 & 28: X-Athletics in (France) Aubière
  - Men's heptathlon winner: (Switzerland) Simon Ehammer
  - Women's pentathlon winner: (Spain) María Vicente
- February 3 & 4: Tallinn 2024 in (Estonia) Tallinn
  - Men's heptathlon winner: (Norway) Sander Skotheim
  - Women's pentathlon winner: (Ukraine) Yuliya Loban
- April 17 & 18: Mt. SAC Relays in (United States) Walnut
  - Men's heptathlon winner: (Puerto Rico) Ayden Owens-Delerme
  - Women's pentathlon winner: (United States) Michelle Atherley
- June 21-25: US Olympic Team Trials - Open Combined Events Championships in (United States) Eugene
- June 29 & 30: International Combined Events Meeting in (United Kingdom) Hexham

=== Bronze ===
- May 11 & 12: Cyclades Combined Events Meeting in (Greece) Milos
  - Men's decathlon winner: (Estonia) Taavi Tšernjavski
  - Women's heptathlon winner: (Sweden) Lovisa Karlsson
- August 17 & 18: Sollentuna Combined Events in (Sweden) Sollentuna

== 2023–24 World Athletics Cross Country Tour ==
=== Gold ===
- October 22, 2023: Cross Zornotza in (Spain) Amorebieta-Etxano
  - Winners: (Burundi) Célestin Ndikumana (m) / (Ethiopia) Likina Amebaw (f)
- October 29, 2023: Cross de Atapuerca in (Spain) Atapuerca
  - Winners: (Uganda) Jacob Kiplimo (m) / (Kenya) Beatrice Chebet (f)
- November 11, 2023: Cardiff Cross Challenge in (United Kingdom) Cardiff
  - Winners: (Uganda) Keneth Kiprop (m) / (United Kingdom) Megan Keith (f)
- November 12, 2023: Cross Internacional de Italica in (Spain) Sevilla
  - Winners: (Kenya) Ronald Kwemoi (m) / (Kenya) Edinah Jebitok (f)
- November 19, 2023: Cross Internacional de Soria in (Spain) Soria
  - Winners: (Burundi) Rodrigue Kwizera (m) / (Ethiopia) Likina Amebaw (f)
- November 26, 2023: Cross Internacional de la Constitucion Alcobendas - Memorial Antonio Rodriguez Benavente in (Spain) Alcobendas
  - Winners: (Burundi) Rodrigue Kwizera (m) / (Ethiopia) Likina Amebaw (f)
- November 30, 2023: Cross Champs in (United States) Austin
  - Winners: (South Africa) Adriaan Wildschutt (m) / (United States) Katie Wasserman (f)
- December 17, 2023: Cross Internacional de Venta de Baños in (Spain) Venta de Baños
  - Winners: (Spain) Abdessamad Oukhelfen (m) / (Kenya) Edinah Jebitok (f)
- January 6: Campaccio-International Cross Country in (Italy) San Giorgio su Legnano
  - Winners: (Kenya) Daniel Ebenyo (m) / (Burundi) Francine Niyomukunzi (f)
- January 7: Elgoibar Juan Muguerza International Cross country in (Spain) Elgoibar
  - Winners: (Ethiopia) Berihu Aregawi (m) / (Kenya) Beatrice Chebet (f)
- January 21: Cross Cup de Hannut in (Belgium) Hannut
  - Winners: (Rwanda) Yves Nimubona (m) / (Kenya) Edinah Jebitok (f)
- February 3: Sirikwa Classic Cross Country Tour – Gold in (Kenya) Eldoret
  - Winners: (Kenya) Daniel Ebenyo (m) / (Kenya) Emmaculate Anyango (f)
- February 25: Cross Internacional das Amendoeiras em Flor - ECCC XC in (Portugal) Albufeira
  - Winners: (Spain) Thierry Ndikumwenayo (m) / (Ethiopia) Likina Amebaw (f)

=== Silver ===
- September 23, 2023: TCS Lidingöloppet in (Sweden) Lidingö
  - Winners: (United States) Diego Estrada (m) / (Sweden) Carolina Johnson (f)
- October 21, 2023: NI & Ulster and Bobby Rea International Cross Country in (United Kingdom) Belfast
  - Winners: (Ethiopia) Yohanes Asmare (m) / (United Kingdom) Izzy Fry (f)
- November 5, 2023: Cross Internacional de San Sebastián in (Spain) San Sebastián
  - Winners: (Kenya) Ronald Kwemoi (m) / (Kenya) Edinah Jebitok (f)
- November 18, 2023: NCAA D1 Cross Country Championships in (United States) Charlottesville
  - Winners: (United States) Graham Blanks (m) / (United States) Parker Valby (f)
- November 26, 2023: International Warandecross Tilburg in (Netherlands) Tilburg
  - Winners: (Netherlands) Bram Anderiessen (m) / (Netherlands) Jetske van Kampen (f)
- December 23, 2023: Trofeo Ibercaja Zaragoza Gran Premio de Aragon in (Spain) Zaragoza
  - Winners: (Burundi) Eric Nzambimana (m) / (United States) Katie Izzo (f)
- January 21: LIII Gran Premio Cáceres Diputación de Cáceres in (Spain) Cáceres
  - Winners: (Kenya) David Kiplagat (m) / (Ethiopia) Likina Amebaw (f)

=== Bronze ===
- October 15, 2023: Autumn Open International in (Republic of Ireland) Dublin
  - Winners: (Republic of Ireland) Keelan Kilrehill (m) / (Republic of Ireland) Íde Nic Dhómhnaill (f)
- November 19, 2023: Cross Country Bydgoszcz na Start in (Poland) Bydgoszcz
  - Winners: (Poland) Mateusz Gos (m) / (Poland) Olimpia Breza (f)
- December 2, 2023: The Great Chepsaita Cross Country Run in (Kenya) Eldoret
  - Winners: (Kenya) Ishmael Kipkurui (m) / (Kenya) Edinah Jebitok (f)
- January 27: Botswana International Cross Country in Gaborone
  - Winners: (Botswana) Sesebo Matlapeng (m) / (France) Alessia Zarbo (f)
- January 28: Cross della Vallagarina in (Italy) Rovereto
  - Winners: (Spain) Ibrahim Ezzaydouni (m) / (Burundi) Francine Niyomukunzi (f)
- March 16: White Cross in (Serbia) Belgrade
  - Winners: (Kenya) Albert Kipkorir Tonui (m) / (Kenya) Philice Cheboirot Kipkerio (f)

== 2024 World Athletics Race Walking Tour ==
=== Gold ===
- March 3–9: Chinese Race Walking Grand Prix in (China) Taicang
  - 20 km winners: (China) Zhang Jun (m) / (China) Ma Zhenxia (f)
- March 16: Dudinska 50 in (Slovakia) Dudince
  - 20 km winners: (Peru) César Rodríguez (m) / (Peru) Evelyn Inga (f)
- April 6: Poděbrady Walking in (Czech Republic) Poděbrady
  - 20 km winners: (Sweden) Perseus Karlström (m) / (Peru) Kimberly García (f)
- May 5: Korzeniowski Warsaw Race Walking Cup in (Poland) Warsaw
  - 20 km winners: (China) Qian Haifeng (m) / (China) Liu Hong (f)
- May 11: Grande Prémio Internacional de Rio Maior em Marcha Atlética in (Portugal) Rio Maior
  - 20 km winners: (Ecuador) Brian Pintado (m) / (Peru) Kimberly García (f)
- May 18: Gran Premio Cantones de A Coruna de Marcha in (Spain) A Coruña
  - 20 km winners: (Japan) Toshikazu Yamanishi (m) / (Peru) Kimberly García (f)
- October 6: Gran Premio Internacional Finetwork Madrid Marcha in (Spain) Madrid

=== Silver ===
- January 21: USA Marathon Race Walk Mixed Relay Championships & International Race Walk Invitational in (United States) Santee
  - 20 km winners: (Mexico) Brandon Segura (m) / (Mexico) Ilse Guerrero (f)
- February 11: Oceanian & Australian 20km Race Walking Championships in (Australia) Adelaide
  - 20 km winners: (Canada) Evan Dunfee (m) / (Australia) Jemima Montag (f)
- May 25: Záhorácka Dvadsiatka in (Slovakia) Borský Mikuláš
  - 20 km winners: (Germany) Christopher Linke (m) / (Mexico) Sofía Ramos Rodríguez (f)
- October 26: Lusatian International Race-Walking Meeting in (Germany) Zittau

=== Bronze ===
- January 20: Turkish Race Walking Championships in (Turkey) Antalya
  - 20 km winners: (Turkey) Mazlum Demir (m) / (Czech Republic) Eliška Martínková (f)
- January 27 & 28: Supernova in (Australia) Canberra
  - 10,000 m race walk winners: (Canada) Evan Dunfee (m) / (Australia) Jemima Montag (f)
- February 3: Ecuadorian Race Walking Championships Memorial Luis Chocho Sanmartin in (Ecuador) Loja
  - 20 km winners: (Ecuador) Jordy Jiménez (m) / (Ecuador) Paula Milena Torres (f)
  - 35 km winners: (Ecuador) Jinson Calderon (m) / (Ecuador) Catalina Anabel Urdiales (f)
- February 4: Gran Premio de Marcha Atlética Ciudad de Guadix in (Spain) Guadix
  - 10 km winners: (Italy) Francesco Fortunato (m) / (Italy) Antonella Palmisano (f)
  - Women's 20 km winner: (Spain) Maria Moya
- February 25: Spanish Open 20km Championships in (Spain) Zaragoza
  - 20 km winners: (Spain) Paul McGrath (m) / (Spain) Cristina Montesinos (f)
- April 27: The Penn Relay Carnival in (United States) Philadelphia
  - 5,000 m race walk winners: (Colombia) Manuel Esteban Soto (m) / (Hungary) Viktória Madarász (f)

== 2024 National Athletics Championships ==
Indoor

- January 13–14: Bolivian Indoor Championships in (Bolivia) Cochabamba
- January 24–26: Iranian Indoor Championships in (Iran) Tehran
- January 26–27: Azerbaijan Indoor Championships in Baku
- January 27: Russian 1 Mile Indoor Championships in (Russia) Orenburg
- February 2–4: Ukrainian Indoor Championships in (Ukraine) Kyiv
- February 3–4: Japanese Indoor Championships in (Japan) Osaka
- February 5–7: Kazakh Indoor Championships in (Kazakhstan) Astana
- February 16–18: German Indoor Athletics Championships in (Germany) Leipzig
- February 16–17: Danish Indoor Championships in (Denmark) Odense
- February 16–18: Spanish Indoor Athletics Championships in (Spain) Ourense
- February 16–18: Swedish Indoor Athletics Championships in (Sweden) Karlstad
- February 16–17: 2024 USA Indoor Track and Field Championships in (United States) Albuquerque
- February 17–18: Bosnia & Herzegovina Championships in (Serbia) Belgrade
- February 17–18: Swiss Indoor Athletics Championships in (Switzerland) St. Gallen
- February 17–18: Serbian Indoor Championships in (Serbia) Belgrade
- February 17–18: Icelandic Indoor Championships in (Iceland) Reykjavík
- February 17–18: Austrian Indoor Championships in (Austria) Linz
- February 17–18: Lithuanian Indoor Athletics Championships in (Lithuania) Panevėžys
- February 17–18: Greek Indoor Championships in (Greece) Piraeus
- February 17–18: Polish Indoor Athletics Championships in (Poland) Toruń
- February 17–18: Finnish Indoor Athletics Championships in (Finland) Tampere
- February 17–18: Dutch Indoor Athletics Championships in (Netherlands) Apeldoorn
- February 17–18: Croatian Indoor Championships in (Croatia) Zagreb
- February 17–18: Italian Athletics Indoor Championships in (Italy) Ancona
- February 17–18: Czech Indoor Athletics Championships in (Czech Republic) Ostrava
- February 17–18: French Indoor Athletics Championships in (France) Miramas
- February 17–18: 2024 British Indoor Athletics Championships in (United Kingdom) Birmingham
- February 17–18: Irish Indoor Athletics Championships in (Republic of Ireland) Dublin
- February 17: Moldovan Indoor Championships in (Moldova) Chișinău
- February 17–18: Turkish Indoor Athletics Championships in (Turkey) Istanbul
- February 17–18: Belarus Indoor Championships in Mogilev
- February 17–18: Latvian Indoor Championships in (Latvia) Valmiera
- February 17–18: Estonian Indoor Athletics Championships in (Estonia) Tallinn
- February 17–18: Slovak Indoor Championships in (Slovakia) Bratislava
- February 17–18: Slovenian Indoor Championships in (Slovenia) Novo Mesto
- February 17–18: Romanian Indoor Championships in (Romania) Bucharest
- February 17–18: Norwegian Indoor Athletics Championships in (Norway) Steinkjer
- February 17–18: Hungarian Indoor Championships in (Hungary) Nyíregyháza
- February 17–18: Portuguese Indoor Championships in (Portugal) Pombal
- February 17–18: Bulgarian Indoor Championships in (Bulgaria) Sofia
- February 18: Luxembourg Indoor Championships in Luxembourg
- February 18: Belgian Indoor Athletics Championships in (Belgium) Louvain-La-Neuve
- February 23–25: Russian Indoor Athletics Championships in (Russia) Moscow
- February 29: Belarus Relay Championships in Mogilev
- March 15–17: Canadian Indoor Championships in (Canada) Montreal
- March 29–31: Chinese Indoor Championships in (China) Tianjin

Outdoor

- February 10: Puerto Rican Similar Events Championships in (Puerto Rico) Mayagüez
- March 2–3: Grenadian Championships in (Grenada) St. George's
- March 14–17: New Zealand Athletics Championships in Wellington
- March 20–25: South African Athletics Championships in (South Africa) Bloemfontein

Indoor combined events
Outdoor combined events

- February 17–18: New Zealand Combined Events Championships in Dunedin
- April 13–14: Cyprus Combined Events Championships in Nicosia
- April 20–21: Croatian Combined Events Championships in (Croatia) Zagreb
- April 24–25: Israeli Combined Events Championships in (Israel) Tel Aviv
- May 4–5: Montenegro Combined Events Championships in Bar
- May 4–5: Slovenian Combined Events Championships in (Slovenia) Maribor
- May 18–19: Ukrainian Combined Events Championships in (Ukraine) Lutsk
- May 18–19: Polish Combined Events Championships in (Poland) Warsaw
- May 18–19: French Combined Events Championships in (France) Oyonnax
- May 18–19: Czech Combined Events Championships in (Czech Republic) Olomouc
- May 25–26: Austrian Combined Events Championships Men in (Austria) Salzburg
- May 25–26: Norwegian Combined Events Championships in (Norway) Bergen
- June 21–25: US Olympic Team Trials - Open Combined Events Championships in (United States) Eugene
- June 29–30: Tunisian Combined Events, Relay and Race Walking Championships in (Tunisia) Radès
- July 13–14: Irish Combined Event Championships in (Republic of Ireland) Dublin

Race walking
Marathon
Half marathon
Road running
10,000 m

== Mountain running ==
=== 2024 Valsir Mountain Running World Cup ===
- June 21: Broken Arrow VK in (United States) Lake Tahoe
- June 23: Broken Arrow Skyrace in (United States) Lake Tahoe
- July 7: Großglockner Mountain Run in (Austria) Grossglockner
- July 14: Montemuro Vertical Run in (Portugal) Castro Daire
- July 20: La Montee Du Nid D'Aigle in (France) Saint-Gervais-les-Bains
- July 28: Giir di Mont in (Italy) Premana
- August 10: Sierre-Zinal in (Switzerland) Zinal
- August 31: Vertical Nasego in (Italy) Casto
- September 1: Trofeo Nasego in (Italy) Casto
- September 22: Sky Gran Canaria in (Spain) Agaete
- October 5: Šmarna Gora Race in (Slovenia) Ljubljana
- October 12: Lagunc KM verticale in (Italy) Chiavenna
- October 13: Val Bregaglia Trail in (Italy) Chiavenna

== Retirements ==
- Álvaro Martín, Olympic gold medallist, two-time World Champion in racewalking.
- Andrew Pozzi, 2018 world indoor champion in the 60 m hurdles.
- Christian Taylor, two-time Olympic champion and four-time world champion in the triple jump.
- David Storl, two-time world champion in the shot put.
- Pavel Maslák, three-time world indoor champion in the 400 m.
- Vítězslav Veselý, 2013 world champion in the javelin throw.
