= 2023–24 World Athletics Cross Country Tour =

- Organisers: World Athletics
- Edition: 3rd
- Dates: 22 October 2023 – 25 February 2024 (Gold level)

The 2023–24 World Athletics Cross Country Tour, also known as the 2024 Cross Country Tour, is the third season of the annual series of cross country running meetings organised by World Athletics. The Tour forms the highest level of international cross country.

The Cross Country Tour is divided into three levels – Gold, Silver, and Bronze – each of which has different levels of competition and different prize offerings.

The Gold-level meetings award extra World Athletics Rankings cross country placement points, which can be used to earn automatic qualification into the 10,000 metres track races at the 2024 Summer Olympics.

== Schedule ==
Date	Meeting	Venue	Country	Men's winner	Women's winner
Gold Level Meetings (13)
22 Oct	Cross Internacional Zornotza	Amorebieta-Etxano	Spain	Célestin Ndikumana (BDI)	Likina Amebaw (ETH)
29 Oct	Cross Internacional de Atapuerca	Atapuerca	Spain	Jacob Kiplimo (UGA)	Beatrice Chebet (KEN)
11 Nov	Cardiff Cross Challenge	Cardiff	Great Britain	Keneth Kiprop (UGA)	Megan Keith (GBR)
12 Nov	Cross Internacional de Italica	Sevilla	Spain	Ronald Kwemoi (KEN)	Edinah Jebitok (KEN)
19 Nov	Cross Internacional de Soria	Soria	Spain	Rodrigue Kwizera (BDI)	Likina Amebaw (ETH)
26 Nov	Cross Internacional de la Constitucion Alcobendas - Memorial Antonio Rodriguez Benavente	Alcobendas	Spain	Rodrigue Kwizera (BDI)	Likina Amebaw (ETH)
30 Nov	Cross Champs	Austin, TX	United States	Adriaan Wildschutt (RSA)	Katie Wasserman (USA)
17 Dec	Cross Internacional de Venta de Baños	Venta de Baños	Spain	Abdessamad Oukhelfen (ESP)	Edinah Jebitok (KEN)
6 Jan	Campaccio-International Cross Country	San Giorgio su Legnano	Italy	Daniel Ebenyo (KEN)	Francine Niyomukunzi (BDI)
7 Jan	Elgoibar Juan Muguerza International Cross country	Elgoibar	Spain	Berihu Aregawi (ETH)	Beatrice Chebet (KEN)
21 Jan	Cross Cup de Hannut	Hannut	Belgium	Yves Nimubona (RWA)	Edinah Jebitok (KEN)
3 Feb	Sirikwa Classic Cross Country Tour – Gold	Eldoret	Kenya	Daniel Ebenyo (KEN)	Emmaculate Anyango (KEN)
25 Feb	Cross Internacional das Amendoeiras em Flor - ECCC XC	Albufeira	Portugal	Thierry Ndikumwenayo (BDI)	Likina Amebaw (ETH)
Silver Level Meetings (7)
23 Sep	TCS Lidingöloppet	Lidingö	Sweden	Diego Estrada (USA)	Carolina Johnson (SWE)
21 Oct	NI & Ulster and Bobby Rea International Cross Country	Belfast	Great Britain	Yohanes Asmare (ETH)	Izzy Fry (GBR)
5 Nov	Cross Internacional de San Sebastián	San Sebastián	Spain	Ronald Kwemoi (KEN)	Edinah Jebitok (KEN)
18 Nov	NCAA D1 Cross Country Championships	Charlottesville, VA	United States	Graham Blanks (USA)	Parker Valby (USA)
26 Nov	International Warandecross Tilburg	Tilburg	Netherlands	Bram Anderiessen (NED)	Jetske Van Kampen (NED)
23 Dec	Trofeo Ibercaja Zaragoza Gran Premio de Aragon	Zaragoza	Spain	Eric Nzambimana (BDI)	Katie Izzo (USA)
21 Jan	Gran Premio Cáceres Diputación de Cáceres	Cáceres	Spain	David Kiplagat (KEN)	Likina Amebaw (ETH)
Bronze Level Meetings (6)
15 Oct	Autumn Open International	Dublin	Ireland	Keelan Kilrehill (IRL)	Ide Nic Dhomhnaill (IRL)
19 Nov	Cross Country Bydgoszcz na Start	Bydgoszcz	Poland	Mateusz Gos (POL)	Olimpia Breza (POL)
2 Dec	The Great Chepsaita Cross Country Run	Eldoret	Kenya	Ishmael Rokitto Kipkurui (KEN)	Edinah Jebitok (KEN)
27 Jan	Botswana International Cross Country	Gaborone	Botswana	Sesebo Matlapeng (BOT)	Alessia Zarbo (FRA)
28 Jan	Cross della Vallagarina	Rovereto	Italy	Ibrahim Ezzaydouni (ESP)	Francine Niyomukunzi (BDI)
16 Mar	White Cross	Beograd	Serbia	Albert Kipkorir Tonui (KEN)	Kipkerio Philice-Cheboirot (KEN)
