= 2023 Cross de Atapuerca =

- Dates: 29 October 2023
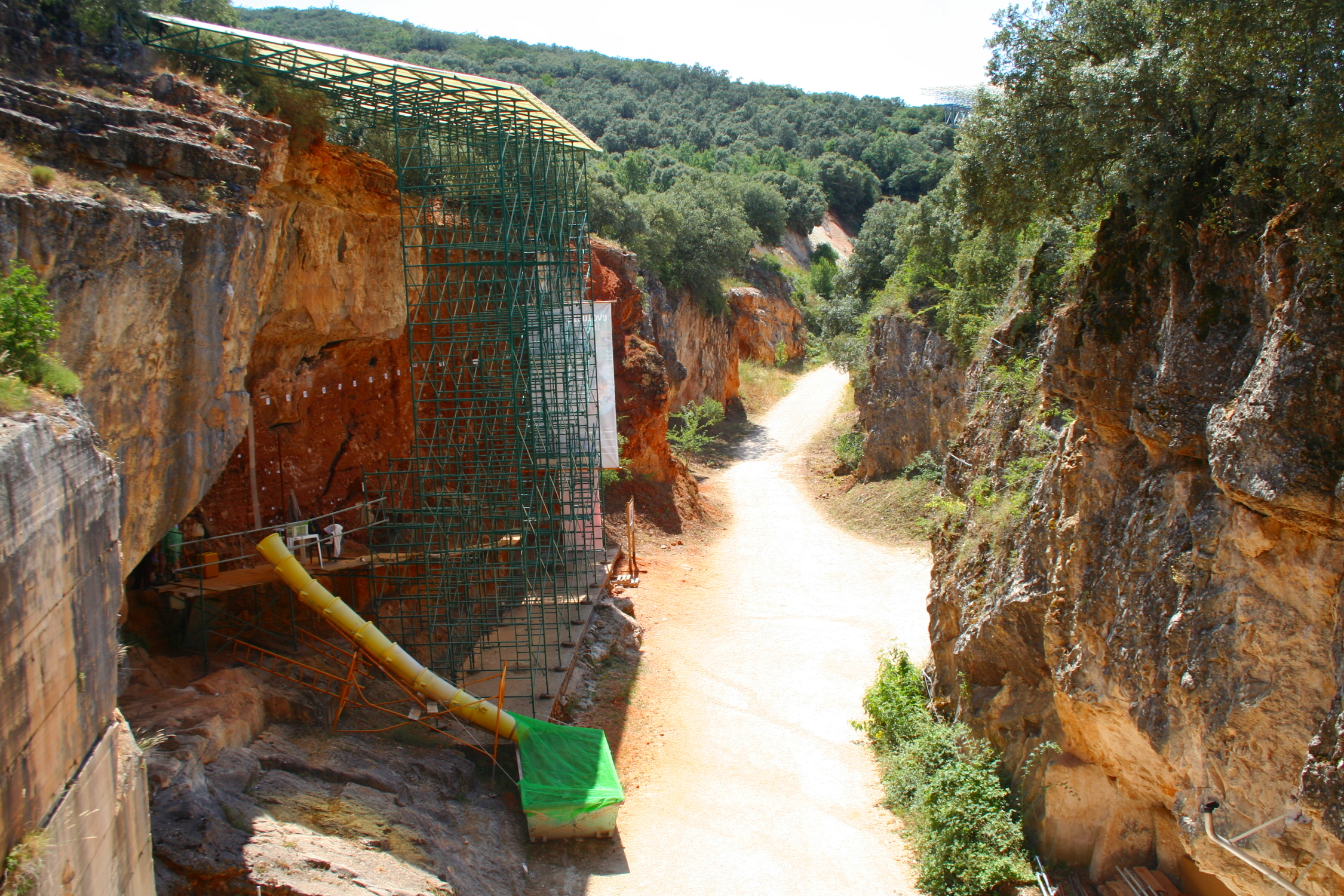
- The archaeological site of Atapuerca which the course runs through
- Level: 2023–24 World Athletics Cross Country Tour Gold

The 2023 Cross de Atapuerca, officially the 2023 Cross Internacional de Atapuerca, was the 19th edition of the international cross country running competition held in Atapuerca, Province of Burgos, Spain on 29 October 2023. It was the second leg of the 2023–24 World Athletics Cross Country Tour Gold, the highest-level global series of cross country competitions.

== Recap ==
Jacob Kiplimo and Beatrice Chebet won the two races. The win was encouraging for Kiplimo, who was recovering from a hamstring injury in August. The courses were marred by wind and rain.

== Results ==
In combination with two other eligible cross country races, points from the 2023 Cross de Atapuerca could be used to qualify for the 10,000 metres track race at the 2024 Summer Olympics. The top eight athletes ordered by total score (summed from their top three cross country performances) were granted automatic qualification, respecting the maximum three athletes per country.

Men's 9 km Cross Country
Place	Athlete	Age	Country	Time	Points
1st place, gold medalist(s)	Jacob Kiplimo	22	Uganda	26:00	1240
2nd place, silver medalist(s)	Ronald Kwemoi	28	Kenya	26:15	1220
3rd place, bronze medalist(s)	Rodrigue Kwizera	24	Burundi	26:16	1200
4	Célestin Ndikumana	21	Burundi	26:47	1180
5	Leonard Chemutai	20	Uganda	26:48	1160
6	Tadesse Getahon	25	Israel	26:48	1145
7	Nassim Hassaous	29	Spain	27:00	1130
8	Abdessamad Oukhelfen	24	Spain	27:06	1120
9	Merhawi Mebrahtu	20	Eritrea	27:08	1110
10	Sergio Paniagua	28	Spain	27:17	1100
11	Cormac Dalton	25	Ireland	27:19	1090
12	Fernando Carro	31	Spain	27:26	1080
13	Roberto Aláiz	33	Spain	27:35	1070
14	Pablo Sánchez	26	Spain	27:36	1060
15	Yahya Aouina el Karboubi	27	Spain	27:37	1055
16	Ibrahim Chakir	29	Spain	27:37	1050
17	Alejandro Quijada	22	Spain	27:39	1045
18	Ibrahim Ezzaydouni	32	Spain	27:46	1040
19	Adam Maijó Frígola	22	Spain	27:46	1035
20	Mario Mola	33	Spain	27:48	1030
21	Adria Ceballos	21	Spain	27:50	1025
22	Nahuel Carabaña	23	Andorra	27:52	1020
23	Oliver Löfqvist	25	Sweden	27:53	1015
24	Miguel Angel Martínez	21	Spain	27:57	1010
25	Andreu Blanes	32	Spain	28:05	1005
26	Miguel Baidal	22	Spain	28:07	1000
27	Daniel Arce	31	Spain	28:16	995
28	Juan Antonio Pérez	34	Spain	28:16	990
29	Mario Priego	20	Spain	28:18	985
30	Ayad Lamdassem	42	Spain	28:20	980
31	João Pais	21	Portugal	28:21	975
32	Carlos Ángel	20	Spain	28:23	970
33	Roger Suria	20	Spain	28:25	965
34	Vicente Viciosa	23	Spain	28:29	960
35	Jesús Gómez	32	Spain	28:37	955
36	Rubén Álvarez	21	Spain	28:40	950
37	Ruben Marques	24	Spain	28:45	945
38	Víctor Ruiz	30	Spain	28:45	940
39	El Hocine Bouchrak	25	Spain	28:46	935
40	Ruben Sanchez	36	Spain	28:47	930
41	Alejandro Onís	22	Spain	28:50	927
42	Sergio Jiménez	28	Spain	28:57	924
43	Pablo Bravo	21	Spain	28:59	921
44	Eleazar Canton	22	Spain	28:59	918
45	Borja Marcos	22	Spain	29:06	915
46	Ramon Rodriguez	22	Spain	29:06	912
47	Ismail Atriki	21	Spain	29:09	909
48	Jorge Blanco	30	Spain	29:16	906
49	ruben Daniel Monteiro	19–20	Portugal	29:16	903
50	Jorge David Torre	25	Spain	29:20	900
51	Marc Fernández	21	Spain	29:24	898
52	Daniel Alonso	24	Spain	29:29	896
53	Alejandro Ortuño	24	Spain	29:29	894
54	Hugo de Miguel	22	Spain	29:33	892
55	Miguel Barzola	41	Argentina	29:35	890
56	Sergio Martinez	21	Spain	29:48	888
57	Marco Teixeira	31	Portugal	29:57	886
58	Fabian Blanco	22	Spain	30:01	884
59	Daniel Ruales	22	Spain	30:03	882
60	Juan José Buena	38	Spain	30:16	880
61	Rodrigo Andueza	20–21	Spain	30:16	879
62	Juan Bueno	37	Spain	30:17	878
63	Lucas Mola	30	Spain	30:23	877
64	João Pereira	20	Portugal	30:23	876
65	Pau Mas	19–20	Spain	30:25	875
66	Alvaro Gutierrez	20–21	Spain	30:31	874
67	Jairo Grijalvo	31	Spain	30:36	873
68	Adrian Moro	22	Spain	30:38	872
69	Lourenço Ferreira	19	Portugal	30:44	871
70	Ivan Peñalba	21–22	Spain	30:44	870
71	Daniel Sanchez	23	Spain	30:48	869
72	Alejandro Novillo	31	Spain	30:53	868
73	Alejandro Paredero	33–34	Spain	30:55	887
74	Jonas Redondo	20	Spain	30:58	866
75	David Gomez	35	Spain	31:01	865
76	Guillermo Rubio	21–22	Spain	31:05	864
77	Mohamed Raissi	23–24	Spain	31:06	863
78	Alvaro Gil	35	Spain	31:11	862
79	Mikel Azcona GoñI	30	Spain	31:11	861
80	Diego Varona	26	Spain	31:18	860
81	Rodrigo Gonzalez	26	Spain	31:19	
82	Alberto Cubo	25	Spain	31:21	
83	Victor Gonzalez	32	Spain	31:27	
84	Javier Magaña	35	Spain	31:28	
85	Ruben Moreno	24–25	Spain	31:29	
86	Manuel Ridruejo	21	Spain	31:41	
87	Israel Arbizu	31	Spain	31:42	
88	Sergio Piña	22–23	Spain	31:44	
89	Javier de Miguel	21	Spain	31:51	
90	Alex Munneke	19–20	Spain	31:55	
91	Ignacio Cuesta	31	Spain	31:57	
92	Héctor Rodríguez	28	Spain	32:06	
93	David Carranza	21	Spain	32:13	
94	Alberto Bueno	32	Spain	32:16	
95	José Maria Cantero	31	Spain	32:28	
96	Fernando Matarranz	22–23	Spain	32:31	
97	Martin Barreiro	19–20	Spain	32:38	
98	Ruben Ceballos	37–38	Spain	32:56	
99	Diego Cantalapiedra	44–45	Spain	32:59	
100	Daniel Navarro	40	Spain	32:59	
101	Mikel Astiz	33	Spain	33:00	
102	Ivan Sobredo	40	Spain	33:03	
103	Martin Miguez	21	Spain	33:13	
104	Ekaitz Tejado	19–20	Spain	33:41	
105	Sergio Santiago	48	Spain	33:42	
106	Samuel López-Davadillo	29	Spain	33:46	
107	Antonio Sanchez	30–31	Spain	35:02	
	David Palacio	35	Spain	DNF	
	Pol Oriach	21	Spain	DNF	
	Leandro Monteiro	20	Portugal	DNF	
	Duarte Santos	20	Portugal	DNF	
	Hamza Bouchallikh	21	Morocco	DNF	
	Enrique Martinez	28	Spain	DNF	
	Rodrigo Gallego	20–21	Spain	DNF	
	Eduardo Menacho	23	Spain	DNF	
	Antonio Abadía	33	Spain	DNF	
	Eduardo Alvarez	21	Spain	DNF	
	Angel Alejandro Nieto	35	Spain	DNF	

Women's 8 km Cross Country
Place	Athlete	Age	Country	Time	Points
1st place, gold medalist(s)	Beatrice Chebet	23	Kenya	25:21	1240
2nd place, silver medalist(s)	Sarah Chelangat	22	Uganda	25:36	1220
3rd place, bronze medalist(s)	Edinah Jebitok	21	Kenya	25:44	1200
4	Likina Amebaw	25	Ethiopia	26:06	1180
5	Megan Keith	21	Great Britain	26:39	1160
6	Lucy Mawia	24–25	Kenya	26:54	1145
7	Majida Maayouf	34	Spain	27:07	1130
8	Lemlem Nibret	18	Ethiopia	27:13	1120
9	Ikram Ouaaziz	24	Morocco	27:45	1110
10	Marta García	25	Spain	28:05	1100
11	Irene Sánchez-Escribano	31	Spain	28:11	1090
12	Carolina Robles	31	Spain	28:11	1080
13	María Forero	20	Spain	28:14	1070
14	Angela Viciosa	21	Spain	28:16	1060
15	Aimee Pratt	26	Great Britain	28:23	1055
16	Rosalía Tárraga	26	Spain	28:25	1050
17	Cristina Ruiz	24	Spain	28:27	1045
18	Irene Pelayo	43	Spain	28:34	1040
19	Laura Priego	25	Spain	28:41	1035
20	Blanca Fernández	31	Spain	28:42	1030
21	Esther Navarrete	33	Spain	28:43	1025
22	Claudia Estevez	28	Spain	28:45	1020
23	June Arbeo Sarriugarte	24	Spain	28:45	1015
24	Isabel Barreiro	24	Spain	28:49	1010
25	Alicia Berzosa	23	Spain	28:52	1005
26	Naima Ait Alibou	24	Spain	28:54	1000
27	Paula González Blanco	27	Spain	28:58	995
28	María Luz Tesuri	30	Argentina	29:03	990
29	Marta Serrano	20	Spain	29:10	985
30	Maria Ureña	26	Spain	29:15	980
31	Andrea Romero	23	Spain	29:18	975
32	Mireya Arnedillo	20	Spain	29:27	970
33	Lidia Campo	32	Spain	29:30	965
34	Sara López	22	Spain	29:31	960
35	Fabiane Meyer	20	Germany	29:43	955
36	Claudia Corral	21	Spain	29:45	950
37	Rocio Garrido	20	Spain	29:49	945
38	Antía Castro	20	Spain	29:50	940
39	Marina Bagur	27	Spain	29:57	935
40	Lucía Rodríguez	25	Spain	30:04	930
41	Alba Sorrigueta	25	Spain	30:07	927
42	Azucena Díaz	40	Spain	30:08	924
43	Noemi Cano	24	Spain	30:20	921
44	Alicia Carrera	30	Spain	30:30	918
45	Ines Docampo	20	Spain	30:35	915
46	Marina Freixa	22	Spain	30:39	912
47	Paula Villaverde	20	Spain	30:44	909
48	Jihad Essoubai	19	Spain	30:57	906
49	Carla Masip	26	Spain	31:20	903
50	Pilar Moreno	20	Spain	31:44	900
51	Carla Domínguez	20	Spain	31:45	898
52	Laura Gonzalez	34	Spain	32:05	896
53	Violeta Alonso	21	Spain	32:05	894
54	Alicia Lapresa	30	Spain	32:17	892
55	Itzíar Manso	21–22	Spain	32:24	890
56	Vera Simões	21	Portugal	32:30	888
57	Lucia Centeno	21–22	Spain	32:31	886
58	Ángela Iglesias	20	Spain	32:32	884
59	Patricia Guerra	20	Spain	32:34	882
60	Raquel de Francisco	23	Spain	32:43	880
61	Celia de Las Heras	20	Spain	32:58	879
62	Lucía Corral	22	Spain	33:00	878
63	Maialen Elia	32	Spain	33:04	877
64	Cristina Corral	20	Spain	33:09	876
65	Clara Diaz	19–20	Spain	33:32	875
66	Henar Etxeberria	26	Spain	33:48	874
67	Elisa Garcia	35–36	Spain	34:02	873
68	Laura Garcia	22	Spain	34:05	872
69	Antonia Pons	31	Spain	34:15	871
70	Claudia Impuesto	19	Spain	34:25	870
71	Maria Campo	22	Spain	34:32	869
72	Sofía Villafañez	20–21	Spain	34:35	868
	Lucia Varela	20	Spain	DNF	
	Carla Gallardo	24	Spain	DNF	
	Miriam Costa	25	Spain	DNF	
	Marta Martin	25	Spain	DNF	

== See also ==
- 2023–24 World Athletics Cross Country Tour
