= Cross Zornotza =

Annual cross country race in Basque Country, Spain

- Date: October
- Location: Amorebieta-Etxano
- Event type: Cross country
- Distance: 2026: 8.7 km for men & women
- Established: 1954
- Website: Official website

The Cross Internacional Zornotza is an annual cross country running event which takes place in January in Amorebieta-Etxano (Zornotza), the Basque Country, Spain. The competition was first held in 1954 and has taken place every year since, with the sole exception of 1961. Organised by the Club Deportiva Zornotza, the event began as a mainly national-level competition and it started to attract elite international competitors from the mid-1980s onwards.

Zornotza has previously been an IAAF and European Athletics status meeting, as well as being in the now-defunct IAAF World Cross Challenge circuit, but is not currently part of an international cross country series. The race suffered from economic problems leading up to the period around 2010, but organisers continued its focus of attracting some of the sport's top competitors. The competition's course, the Jauregibarria, played host to the 1993 IAAF World Cross Country Championships.

The competition features two elite level races: a 10.7 km race for men and a 6.7 km contest for women. In addition to these, several shorter races are held for local runners and youths. Past winners of the elite race include two-time Olympic champion Derartu Tulu. Mariano Haro, a Spanish World Cross medallist, has won the competition more than any other athlete (seven) and won five times consecutively in the mid-1970s.

== Past senior race winners ==
=== National era ===
Edition	Year	Winner
1st	1954	Winner unknown
2nd	1955	Winner unknown
3rd	1956	Winner unknown
4th	1957	Winner unknown
5th	1958	Winner unknown
6th	1959	Winner unknown
7th	1960	José Fernández (ESP)
—	1961	Not held
8th	1962	José Fernández (ESP)
9th	1963	Pablo Fernández (ESP)
10th	1964	Mariano Haro (ESP)
11th	1965	Nicolás López (ESP)
12th	1966	José Antonio Begona (ESP)
13th	1967	José María Barrientos (ESP)
14th	1968	José Miguel Maíz (ESP)
15th	1969	José Antonio Begona (ESP)
16th	1970	Antonio Frechilla (ESP)
17th	1971	Mariano Haro (ESP)
18th	1972	Juan Hidalgo (ESP)
19th	1973	Mariano Haro (ESP)
20th	1974	Mariano Haro (ESP)
21st	1975	Mariano Haro (ESP)
22nd	1976	Mariano Haro (ESP)
23rd	1977	Mariano Haro (ESP)
24th	1978	Fidel García (ESP)

=== International era ===
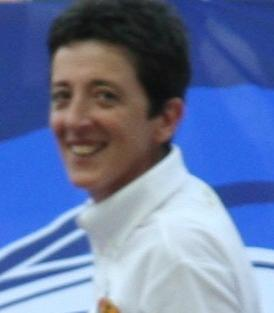
Olympic marathon champion Rosa Mota won in 1986.

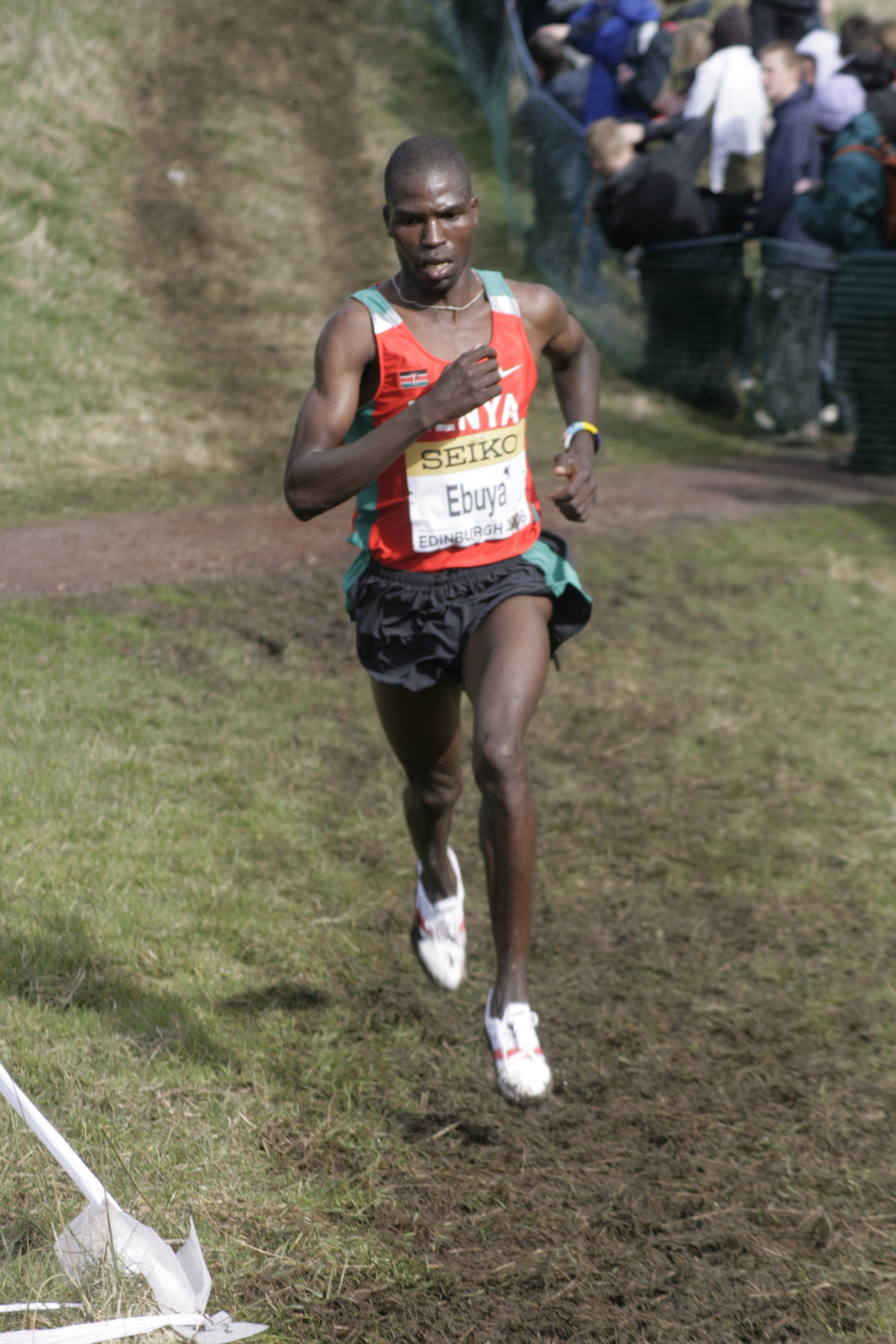
The 2010 world champion Joseph Ebuya won in 2011 and 2012

Edition	Year	Men's winner	Time (m:s)	Women's winner	Time (m:s)
25th	1979	Roy Bayley (GBR)		Not held	
26th	1980	John Wild (GBR)		Not held	
27th	1981	Antonio Prieto (ESP)		Not held	
28th	1982	Eshetu Tura (ETH)		Not held	
29th	1983	Winner unknown		Not held	
30th	1984	Michael Bishop (GBR)		Jane Furniss-Shields (GBR)	
31st	1985	Wodajo Bulti (ETH)		Ana Isabel Alonso (ESP)	
32nd	1986	Tony Milovsorov (GBR)		Rosa Mota (POR)	
33rd	1987	José Regalo (POR)		Cornelia Bürki (SUI)	
34th	1988	Francisco Sánchez (ESP)		Jane Furniss-Shields (GBR)	
35th	1989	Tim Hutchings (GBR)	32:40	Helen Titterington (GBR)	14:29
36th	1990	Domingos Castro (POR)	33:02	Luchia Yishak (ETH)	12:20
37th	1991	Ezequiel Bitok (KEN)	35:04	Susan Sirma (KEN)	19:06
38th	1992	Fita Bayisa (ETH)	34:34	Luchia Yishak (ETH)	17:55
39th	1993	Held in conjunction with 1993 World Championships			
40th	1994	Domingos Castro (POR)		Hellen Kimaiyo (KEN)	
41st	1995	Paulo Guerra (POR)	31:22	Rose Cheruiyot (KEN)	18:28
42nd	1996	Josephat Machuka (KEN)	31:57	Derartu Tulu (ETH)	18:38
43rd	1997	David Chelule (KEN)	33:45	Elena Fidatov (ROM)	18:03
44th	1998	Paul Koech (KEN)	30:16	Jackline Maranga (KEN)	17:27
45th	1999	Richard Limo (KEN)	33:53	Gete Wami (ETH)	23:19
46th	2000	Serhiy Lebid (UKR)	33:28	Gete Wami (ETH)	23:09
47th	2001	Paul Kosgei (KEN)	31:48	Naomi Mugo (KEN)	22:45
48th	2002	Julius Nyamu (KEN)	31:41	Susan Chepkemei (KEN)	22:27
49th	2003	Albert Chepkurui (KEN)	32:18	Teyba Erkesso (ETH)	22:42
50th	2004	Boniface Kiprop (UGA)	34:35	Ejegayehu Dibaba (ETH)	23:22
51st	2005	Ahmad Hassan Abdullah (QAT)	32:13	Benita Johnson (AUS)	22:23
52nd	2006	Abraham Chebii (KEN)	31:17	Rosa Morató (ESP)	22:19
53rd	2007	Micah Kogo (KEN)	32:03	Vivian Cheruiyot (KEN)	21:59
54th	2008	Tariku Bekele (ETH)	32:11	Vivian Cheruiyot (KEN)	23:27
55th	2009	Samuel Tsegay (ERI)	31:36	Linet Masai (KEN)	21:36
56th	2010	Hunegnaw Mesfin (ETH)	35:24	Ann Mwangi (KEN)	24:22
57th	2011	Joseph Ebuya (KEN)	31:27	Pauline Korikwiang (KEN)	22:48
58th	2012	Joseph Ebuya (KEN)	31:33	Nazret Weldu (ERI)	23:45
59th	2013	Mark Kiptoo (KEN)	32:42	Magdalene Masai (KEN)	23:44
60th	2014	Cyprian Kotut (KEN)	33:28	Magdalene Masai (KEN)	23:55
61st	2015	Timothy Toroitich (UGA)	32:01	Magdalene Masai (KEN)	23:36
62nd	2016	Thomas Ayeko (UGA)	29:33	Mercy Cherono (KEN)	31:51
63rd	2017	Nguse Amlosom (ERI)	32:51	Jessica Martin (GBR)	30:25
64th	2018	Timothy Toroitich (UGA)	36:28	Trihas Gebre (ESP)	33:39
65th	2019	Stanley Waithaka (KEN)	31:58	Trihas Gebre (ESP)	30:36
66th	2020	Enyew Mekonnen (ETH)	33:32	Tsige Abraha (ETH)	29:54
67th	2021	Awet Habte (ERI)	25:54	Francine Niyomukunzi (BDI)	22:39
68th	2022	Rodrigue Kwizera (BDI)	25:45	Isabel Barreiro (ESP)	23:06
69th	2023	Célestin Ndikumana (BDI)	25:34	Likina Amebaw (ETH)	29:36
70th	2024	Rodrigue Kwizera (BDI)	25:29	Francine Niyomukunzi (BDI)	30:07
71st	2025	Emile Hafashimana (BDI)	25:50	Likina Amebaw (ETH)	30:21
72nd	2026	Egide Ntakarutimana (BDI)	25:19	Likina Amebaw (ETH)	28:43

=== Winners by country ===
Country	Men's race	Women's race	Total
Kenya	14	15	29
Ethiopia	6	10	16
Great Britain	5	4	9
Burundi	5	2	7
Spain	2	4	6
Portugal	4	1	5
Eritrea	3	1	4
Uganda	4	0	4
Australia	0	1	1
Qatar	1	0	1
Romania	0	1	1
Switzerland	0	1	1
Ukraine	1	0	1
