= 2023 Cardiff Cross Challenge =

- Dates: 11 November 2023
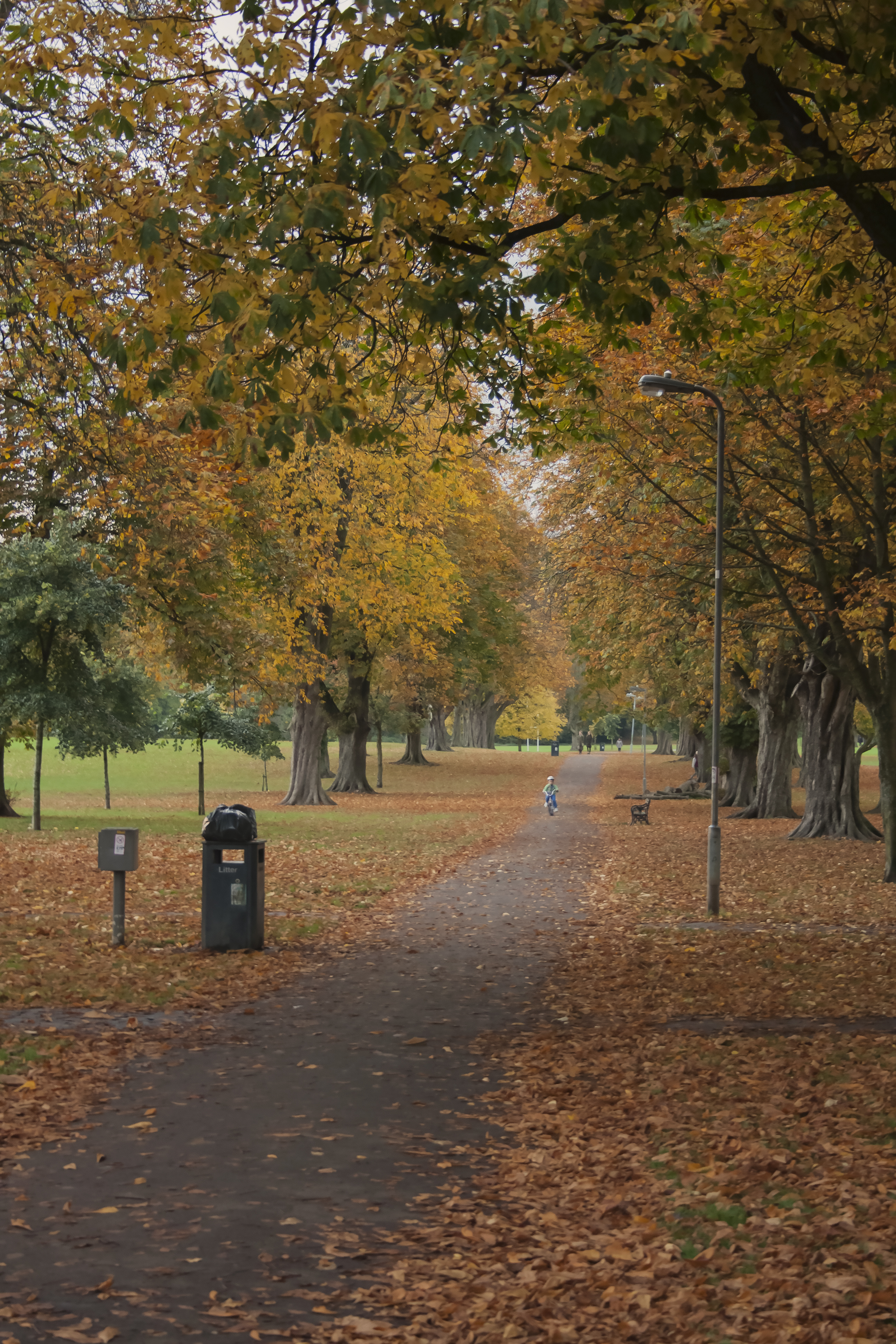
- Llandaff Fields, where the event was held
- Level: 2023–24 World Athletics Cross Country Tour Gold

The 2023 Cardiff Cross Challenge was the 26th edition of the international cross country running competition held in Cardiff, Wales, United Kingdom on 11 November 2023. It was the third leg of the 2023–24 World Athletics Cross Country Tour Gold, the highest-level global series of cross country competitions.

== Recap ==
Keneth Kiprop of Uganda and Megan Keith won the two races.

== Results ==
In combination with two other eligible cross country races, points from the 2023 Cardiff Cross Challenge could be used to qualify for the 10,000 metres track race at the 2024 Summer Olympics. The top eight athletes ordered by total score (summed from their top three cross country performances) were granted automatic qualification, respecting the maximum three athletes per country.

Men's 9.6km Cross Country
Place	Athlete	Age	Country	Time	Points
1st place, gold medalist(s)	Keneth Kiprop	18	Uganda	28:32	1240
2nd place, silver medalist(s)	Vincent Mutai	27	Kenya	28:35	1220
3rd place, bronze medalist(s)	Abel Bekele	17	Ethiopia	29:06	1200
4	Zakariya Mahamed	22	Great Britain	29:19	1180
5	Egide Ntakarutimana	26	Burundi	29:28	1160
6	Yves Nimubona	25	Rwanda	29:30	1145
7	George Wheeler	25	Great Britain	29:31	1130
8	Charles Wheeler	25	Great Britain	29:31	1120
9	Angus McMillan	23	Great Britain	29:38	1110
10	Scott Stirling	29	Great Britain	29:41	1100
11	Matthew Stonier	22	Great Britain	29:52	1090
12	Vincent Kibet Keter	21	Kenya	29:52	1080
13	Mohammadreza Abootorabi	34	Sweden	29:52	1070
14	Yohanes Asmare	17	Ethiopia	29:54	1060
15	Joel Ibler Lillesø	19	Denmark	30:02	1055
16	Marc Scott	29	Great Britain	30:09	1050
17	Richard Slade		Great Britain	30:11	1045
18	Jack Millar	27	Great Britain	30:14	1040
19	Dylan Evans	30	Australia	30:15	1035
20	Phil Norman	34	Great Britain	30:18	1030
21	Samuel Charlton	22	Great Britain	30:28	1025
22	Kurt Taylor	28–29	Great Britain	30:34	1020
23	Thomas Crockett		Great Britain	30:40	1015
24	Jonatan Venema	21	Netherlands	30:44	1010
25	Dewi Griffiths	32	Great Britain	30:50	1005
26	Joe Morrow	24–25	Great Britain	30:51	1000
27	Flynn Jennings		Great Britain	30:54	995
28	Milan Campion		Great Britain	30:56	990
29	Dominic Coy		Great Britain	31:09	985
30	Sam Tyas		Great Britain	31:13	980
31	Naphtali Moulton		United States	31:13	975
32	James Heneghan	24	Great Britain	31:21	970
33	Alex Miell-Ingram	19	Great Britain	31:29	965
34	Felix McGrath	28–29	Great Britain	31:41	960
35	John Millar	25	Great Britain	31:42	955
36	Lewis Hannigan	20	Great Britain	31:42	950
37	Alan Corlett	32	Great Britain	31:49	945
38	Samuel Goodchild		Great Britain	31:53	940
39	Joseph Niven	21–22	Great Britain	32:05	935
40	Robbie Gibson		Great Britain	32:12	930
41	Tim Harrison	23–24	Great Britain	32:14	927
42	Adam Bull		Great Britain	32:16	924
43	Simon Bossi	31–32	France	32:19	921
44	Hugo Hewitt	21–22	Great Britain	32:21	918
45	Jack Eykelbosch		Great Britain	32:36	915
46	Alex Stewart		Great Britain	32:47	912
47	Joe Gentry		Great Britain	32:58	909
48	Steven Denby	21–22	Great Britain	33:45	906
49	Luke Burgess		Great Britain	33:46	903
50	Spencer Smith		Great Britain	33:49	900
51	Janoš Vranek		Great Britain	33:51	898
52	Luke Hamley		Great Britain	33:53	896
53	Devin Coombes		Great Britain	34:28	894
54	Alex Hamblin		Great Britain	34:35	892
55	Mark Ryan		Great Britain	34:43	890
56	Ben Miles		Great Britain	34:57	888
57	Edward Davies		Great Britain	35:01	886
58	David Song		Great Britain	35:06	884
59	Harry Dyall	21–22	Great Britain	35:12	882
60	Harry Chappell		Great Britain	35:14	880
61	Callum Choules		Great Britain	35:18	879
62	Sam Crowther	24–25	Great Britain	35:34	878
63	Shaun Mochan		Ireland	35:35	877
64	Daryl John		Great Britain	35:40	876
65	Ben Hawkins	27	Great Britain	36:49	875
66	Phil Morris		Great Britain	37:52	874
67	Felix Wright		Great Britain	38:05	873
68	John Fitzpatrick		Great Britain	38:45	872
69	Andrew Harling		Great Britain	38:50	871
70	William Nicolle		Great Britain	41:05	870
71	Mark Fowles		Great Britain	41:14	869
72	Jonathan James		Great Britain	42:24	868
73	Ross Hosking		Great Britain	42:39	887
74	Arwel Roberts		Great Britain	42:49	866
75	Nick Pepin		Great Britain	42:53	865
76	Graham Vyner		Great Britain	43:19	864
77	Conor Lee		Great Britain	44:23	863
78	Philip Roberts		Great Britain	44:24	862
79	Jonathan Jarvis		Great Britain	44:53	861
80	Huw Davies		Great Britain	45:48	860
81	Nicholas Collins		Great Britain	46:10	
82	Ian Derrick		Great Britain	46:25	
83	Raymond Davies		Great Britain	49:22	
84	Simon Kinsey		Great Britain	1:07:40	

Women's 6.4km Cross Country
Place	Athlete	Age	Country	Time	Points
1st place, gold medalist(s)	Megan Keith	21	Great Britain	20:35	1240
2nd place, silver medalist(s)	Likina Amebaw	25	Ethiopia	20:52	1220
3rd place, bronze medalist(s)	Asmarech Anley	17–18	Ethiopia	20:59	1200
4	Meseret Yeshaneh	18	Ethiopia	21:02	1180
5	Jessica Warner-Judd	28	Great Britain	21:29	1160
6	Izzy Fry	23	Great Britain	21:37	1145
7	Sofia Thøgersen	18	Denmark	21:38	1130
8	Jessica Gibbon	27	Great Britain	21:42	1120
9	Lili Anna Vindics-Tóth	25	Hungary	21:52	1110
10	Alexandra Millard	21	Great Britain	21:56	1100
11	Niamh Bridson-Hubbard	25	Great Britain	21:59	1090
12	Francine Niyomukunzi	24	Burundi	22:03	1080
13	Ellie Wallace	24	Great Britain	22:06	1070
14	Niamh Brown	24	Great Britain	22:07	1060
15	Jennifer Nesbitt	28	Great Britain	22:09	1055
16	Olivia Mason	22	Great Britain	22:26	1050
17	Mary Mulhare	30	Ireland	22:36	1045
18	Alice Goodall	22	Great Britain	22:38	1040
19	Sophie Tarver	25	Great Britain	22:41	1035
20	Tia Wilson	21	Great Britain	22:42	1030
21	Julie Emmerson	26–27	Great Britain	22:54	1025
22	Cari Hughes	24	Great Britain	22:56	1020
23	India Pentland	21	Great Britain	22:57	1015
24	Stephanie Twell	34	Great Britain	23:15	1010
25	Almi Nerurkar	22	Great Britain	23:22	1005
26	Dominique Corradi	22	Great Britain	23:34	1000
27	Emily Carroll		Great Britain	23:37	995
28	Kate Maltby	38	Great Britain	23:38	990
29	Daisy Davies		Great Britain	23:49	985
30	Katie Hughes	24	Great Britain	23:50	980
31	Phoebe Law	26	Great Britain	24:05	975
32	Bethany Donnelly	25	Great Britain	24:19	970
33	Martha Owen		Great Britain	24:19	965
34	Lauren Cooper	29	Great Britain	24:24	960
35	Alice Murray-Gourlay	30–31	Great Britain	24:26	955
36	Inca Padfield	20–21	Great Britain	24:34	950
37	Kirstie Booth		Great Britain	24:39	945
38	Katrina Entwistle		Great Britain	24:40	940
39	Jodie Judd	25	Great Britain	24:44	935
40	Kate Roberts	35	Great Britain	24:51	930
41	Donna Morris		Great Britain	25:14	927
42	Lauren Nichols	23	Great Britain	25:34	924
43	Bethany Wallis		Great Britain	25:38	921
44	Georgia Palmer		Great Britain	25:43	918
45	Ffion Higginson	21	Great Britain	25:47	915
46	Emma Powell		Great Britain	25:47	912
47	Ewelina Ciesielska		Great Britain	25:48	909
48	Alex Cawthra		Great Britain	25:55	906
49	Sophie Peach		Great Britain	26:26	903
50	Laurie Marlow	29	Great Britain	26:30	900
51	Molly Canham	22	Great Britain	26:36	898
52	India Ibbotson		Great Britain	26:45	896
53	Bronwen Stratton-Thomas		Great Britain	26:50	894
54	Sabina Russell		Great Britain	27:16	892
55	Georgia Higham		Great Britain	27:23	890
56	Laura Wright		Great Britain	27:39	888
57	Rosie Tinbergen		Great Britain	27:45	886
58	Julie Chamberlain		Great Britain	28:25	884
59	Charlotte Brown		Great Britain	28:44	882
60	Naomi Sutton		Great Britain	28:57	880
61	Samantha Healy		Great Britain	28:58	879
62	Catrin Davies		Great Britain	29:28	878
63	Rebecca Downie		Great Britain	29:44	877
64	Olivia Hookings		Great Britain	31:32	876
65	Renske Bouwens		Great Britain	31:40	875
66	Julia Szajdzicka		Great Britain	35:57	874
67	Mary Granville		Great Britain	45:28	873

== See also ==
- 2023–24 World Athletics Cross Country Tour
