= NCAA Cross Country Championship =

NCAA Cross Country Championship may refer to several annual competitions in cross country running organised by the National Collegiate Athletic Association:

- NCAA Division I men's cross country championships
- NCAA Division II men's cross country championships
- NCAA Division III men's cross country championships
- NCAA Division I women's cross country championships
- NCAA Division II women's cross country championships
- NCAA Division III women's cross country championships

== See also ==
- NCAA Division I Cross Country Championships
