= NCAA Division I Cross Country Championships =

NCAA Division I Cross Country Championships may refer to:

- NCAA Division I men's cross country championships
- NCAA Division I women's cross country championships

== See also ==
- NCAA Cross Country Championship (disambiguation)
