= Cross de Atapuerca =

Cross-country running competition in Atapuerca, Spain

- Date: late October
- Location: Atapuerca, Spain
- Event type: Cross country running
- Distance: 6.821km for men's & women's
- Established: 2004
- Website: Cross de Atapuerca
- Participants: 246 (2019); 271 (2018)

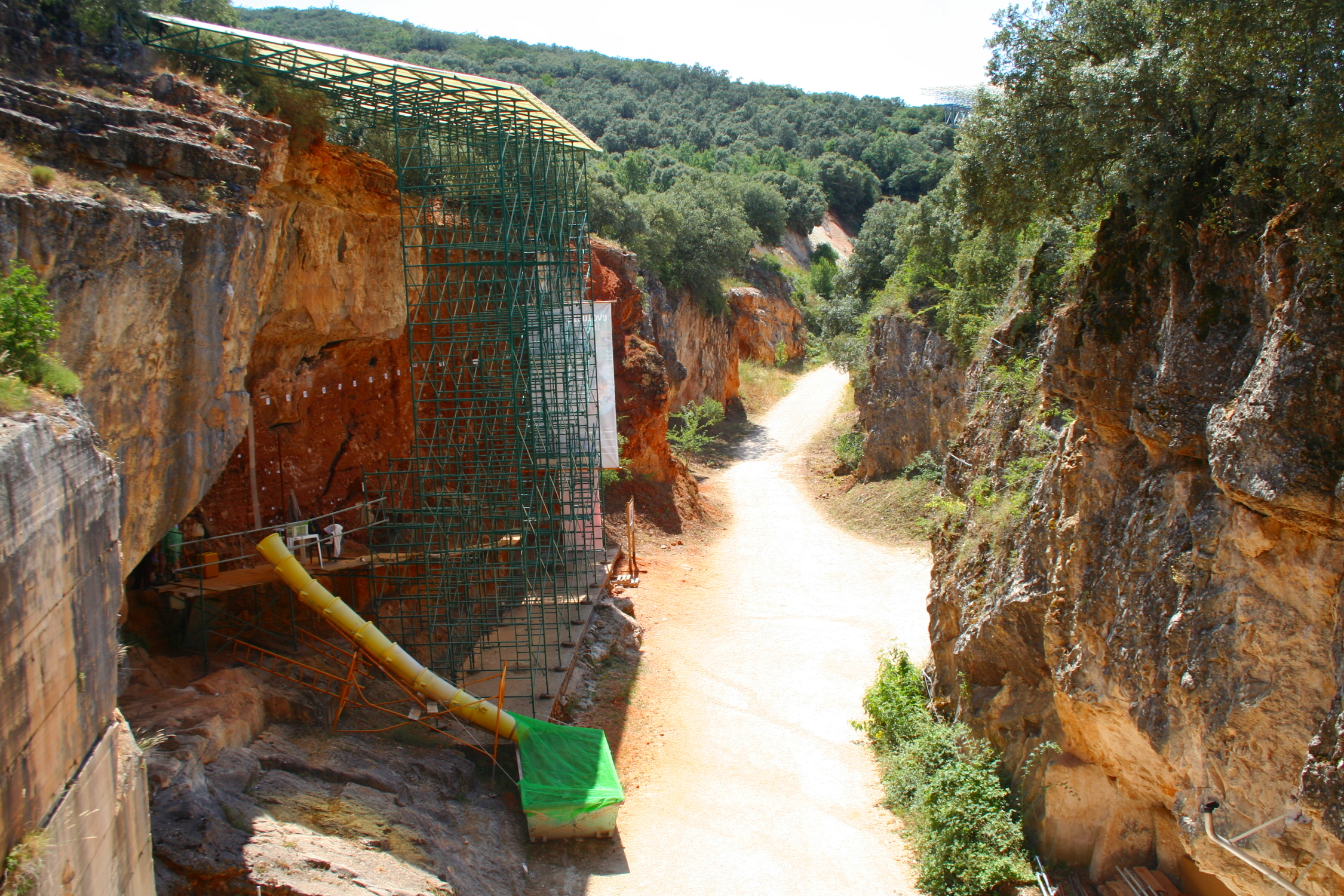
The course of the race passes through the archaeological site in Atapuerca.

The Cross Internacional de Atapuerca is an annual cross country running competition that takes place in Atapuerca, Spain. Established in 2004, it takes place in early November and is among the first major competitions of the cross country season. In its initial years, it was usually the first permit meeting in the European Athletic Association's cross country season, and it now begins the IAAF Permit Meeting series, having replaced the Cross de Soria event in 2010.

The Cross de Atapuerca has attracted high calibre athletes, including World Cross Country Champions Gebregziabher Gebremariam and Leonard Komon, and Linet Masai. Around 2500 athletes took part in the 2009 race, which was broadcast on Teledeporte, the sports channel of Spain's state broadcaster TVE. It is part of the Spanish cross country running circuit and was ranked as the country's second best meet in 2008.

The distances for the professional senior competitions are nine km for men and eight km for women. In addition to the elite races, a separate mass race is held for amateur runners. The Cross de Atapuerca also features a number of different categories and distances based on age: four levels for children, youth (under 16s) and junior (under 18s) competitions, and finally a masters race for runners over 35.

The course of the race traces a path through the fields around the town of Atapuerca and passes through the Archaeological Site of Atapuerca before looping back to complete a circuit.

== Past elite race winners ==
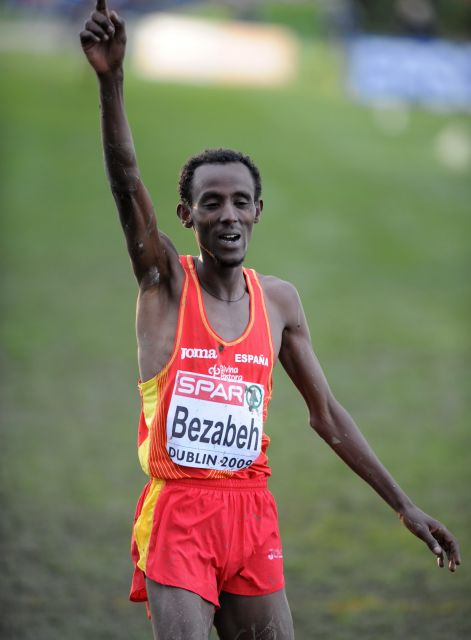
The 2008 winner Alemayehu Bezabeh became European champion in 2009.

Edition	Year	Men's winner	Time (h:m:s)	Women's winner	Time (h:m:s)
I	2004	Jesús Antonio Núñez (ESP)		Nieves Zarza (ESP)	
II	2005	Isaac Viciosa (ESP)		Sara Valderas (ESP)	
III	2006	Hicham Chatt (MAR)		Marta Domínguez (ESP)	
IV	2007	Elijah Kipterege (KEN)	24:23	Simret Sultan (ERI)	13:13
V	2008	Alemayehu Bezabeh (ESP)	23:40	Margaret Muriuki (KEN)	14:11
VI	2009	Gebregziabher Gebremariam (ETH)	24:41	Genzebe Dibaba (ETH)	14:53
VII	2010	Teklemariam Medhin (ERI)	24:33	Genzebe Dibaba (ETH)	22:58
VIII	2011	Imane Merga (ETH)	27:21	Linet Masai (KEN)	24:20
IX	2012	Imane Merga (ETH)	28:07	Hiwot Ayalew (ETH)	25:01
X	2013	Imane Merga (ETH)	28:59	Hiwot Ayalew (ETH)	26:11
XI	2014	Imane Merga (ETH)	27:39	Belaynesh Oljira (ETH)	25:26
XII	2015	Imane Merga (ETH)	25:02	Belaynesh Oljira (ETH)	24:52
XIII	2016	Aweke Ayalew (BHR)	25:05	Senbere Teferi (ETH)	24:48
XIV	2017	Getaneh Molla (ETH)	24:45	Senbere Teferi (ETH)	25:21
XV	2018	Jacob Kiplimo (UGA)	25:10	Senbere Teferi (ETH)	25:51
XVI	2019	Ouassim Oumaiz (ESP)	25:54	Senbere Teferi (ETH)	25:38
XVII	2021	Aron Kifle (ERI)	25:33	Rahel Daniel (ERI)	25:03
XVIII	2022	Thierry Ndikumwenayo (BDI)	27:58	Beatrice Chebet (KEN)	25:39
XIX	2023	Jacob Kiplimo (UGA)	26:00	Beatrice Chebet (KEN)	25:21
XX	2024	Rodrigue Kwizera (BDI)	25:37	Daisy Jepkemei (KAZ)	25:00
XXI	2025	Mathew Kipsang (KEN)	20:05	Nadia Battocletti (ITA)	22:21

== See also ==
- European Cross Country Championships
