= 2023 Cross Zornotza =

- Dates: 22 October 2023
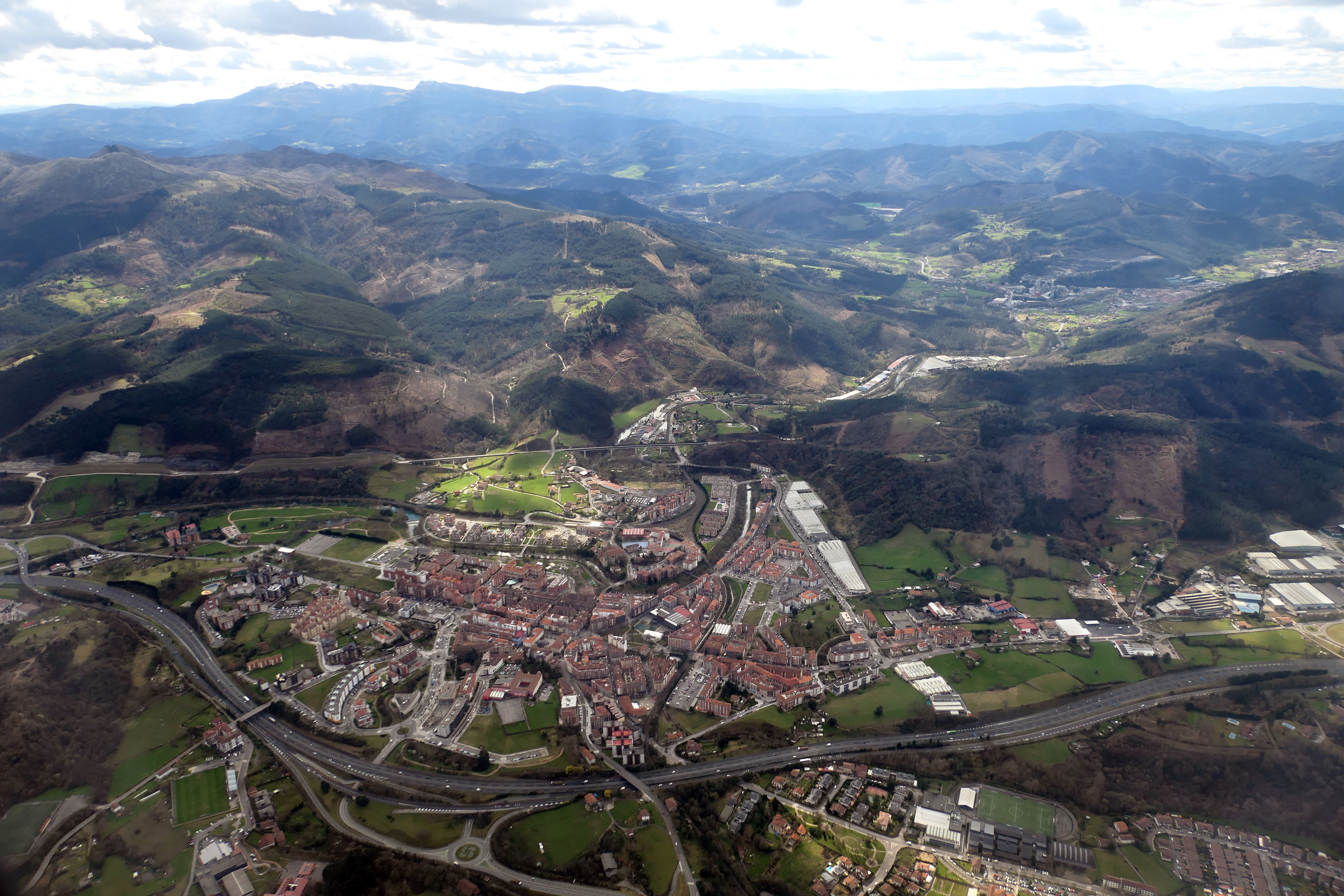
- An overhead view of Zornotza
- Level: 2023–24 World Athletics Cross Country Tour Gold

The 2023 Cross Zornotza, officially the 69º Cross Internacional Zornotza, was the 69th edition of the international cross country running competition held in Amorebieta-Etxano, Spain on 22 October 2023. It was the first leg of the 2023–24 World Athletics Cross Country Tour Gold, the highest-level global series of cross country competitions.

== Recap ==
Likina Amebaw of Ethiopia and Celestin Ndikumana of Burundi won the two races.

== Results ==
In combination with two other eligible cross country races, points from the 2023 Cross Zornotza could be used to qualify for the 10,000 metres track race at the 2024 Summer Olympics. The top eight athletes ordered by total score (summed from their top three cross country performances) were granted automatic qualification, respecting the maximum three athletes per country.

=== XC 8.7km ===
Men's Cross Country
Place	Athlete	Country	Time	Points
1st place, gold medalist(s)	Célestin Ndikumana	Burundi	25:34	1240
2nd place, silver medalist(s)	Merhawi Mebrahtu	Eritrea	25:47	1220
3rd place, bronze medalist(s)	Leonard Chemutai	Uganda	25:57	1200
4	Filmon Kibrom	Eritrea	26:03	1180
5	Sergio Paniagua	Spain	26:20	1160
6	Nassim Hassaous	Spain	26:32	1145
7	Fernando Carro	Spain	26:44	1130
8	David Bascuñana	Spain	26:48	1120
9	Eduardo Menacho	Spain	26:54	1110
10	Ghirmay Ghebreslassie	Eritrea	27:08	1100
11	Raul Celada	Spain	27:15	1090
12	João Pereira	Portugal	27:21	1080
13	Andreu Blanes	Spain	27:28	1070
14	Brahim el Ourzadi	Spain	27:41	1060
15	Nahuel Carabaña	Andorra	28:06	1055
16	Daniel Alonso	Spain	28:52	1050
17	Carlos García	Spain	29:10	1045
18	Brahim Elaasri	Morocco	29:16	1040
19	Sergio Jiménez	Spain	29:28	1035
20	Ekain Larrea	Spain	29:29	1030
21	Javier Pérez	Spain	29:33	1025
22	Diego Alcalde	Spain	29:34	1020
23	Pablo Maldonado	Spain	29:56	1015
24	David Rua	Spain	30:03	1010
25	David Alfonso	Spain	30:15	1005
26	Julen Teran	Spain	30:19	1000
27	Wogen Hoyos	Spain	30:22	995
28	Jon Baz	Spain	30:23	990
29	Ruben Torres	Spain	30:30	985
30	Iker Ortiz	Spain	30:43	980
31	Igor Garcia	Spain	30:50	975
32	Anastasio Gomez	Spain	30:51	970
33	Jon Pascual	Spain	31:07	965
34	Xabier Sanchez	Spain	31:15	960
35	Aimar Sukunza	Spain	31:19	955
36	Jon Ander Etura	Spain	31:22	950
37	Aitor Madrazo	Spain	31:35	945
38	Julen Azpiazu	Spain	31:43	940
39	Paul Iturraspe	Spain	31:49	935
40	Txomin Osoro	Spain	31:57	930
41	Julen Basterretxea	Spain	32:04	927
42	Igor Ruiz	Spain	32:05	924
43	Ander Uriarte	Spain	32:08	921
44	Francisco Javier Fontaneda	Spain	32:10	918
45	Iker Rueda	Spain	32:11	915
46	David Lopez	Spain	32:14	912
47	Eneko Zabala	Spain	32:19	909
48	Aitor Elola	Spain	32:20	906
49	Markel Elesgaray	Spain	32:30	903
50	Jon Etxeberria	Spain	32:32	900
51	Mikael Gurrutxaga	Spain	32:35	898
52	Sergio Mijancos	Spain	32:37	896
53	Jon Napal	Spain	32:40	894
54	Igor Torres	Spain	32:45	892
55	Tomas Laso	Spain	32:46	890
56	Martin Miguez	Spain	32:49	888
57	Unai Lobato	Spain	32:57	886
58	Mikel Baz	Spain	33:01	884
59	Antxon Casal	Spain	33:07	882
60	Ińaki Elola	Spain	33:17	880
61	Younes Ouadou	Spain	33:21	879
62	Javier Solana	Spain	33:25	878
63	Ander Roscales	Spain	33:29	877
64	Sergio Markina	Spain	33:38	876
65	Eduardo Manzanos	Spain	33:38	875
66	Mikel Fernandez	Spain	33:53	874
67	Jose Lagardera	Spain	33:59	873
68	Pedro Sellares	Spain	34:23	872
69	Zohiartze Moral	Spain	34:45	871

Women's Cross Country
Place	Athlete	Country	Time	Points
1st place, gold medalist(s)	Likina Amebaw	Ethiopia	29:36	1240
2nd place, silver medalist(s)	Lemlem Nibret	Ethiopia	29:38	1220
3rd place, bronze medalist(s)	Lucy Mawia	Kenya	30:03	1200
4	Alessia Zarbo	France	31:07	1180
5	Cristina Ruiz	Spain	31:21	1160
6	Irene Pelayo	Spain	31:24	1145
7	Rosalía Tárraga	Spain	31:27	1130
8	Paula González Blanco	Spain	31:35	1120
9	Laura Domene	Spain	31:36	1110
10	Idaira Prieto	Spain	31:45	1100
11	Katerine Tisalema	Ecuador	31:56	1090
12	June Arbeo Sarriugarte	Spain	32:02	1080
13	Claudia Estevez	Spain	32:14	1070
14	Ana Marinho	Portugal	32:35	1060
15	Isabel Barreiro	Spain	32:51	1055
16	Antía Castro	Spain	33:02	1050
17	Queralt Criado	Spain	33:12	1045
18	Oihane Irusta	Spain	35:07	1040
19	Laura Cebollada Martinez	Spain	35:51	1035
20	Eider Muńoz	Spain	36:54	1030
21	Garazi Sampedro	Spain	37:08	1025
22	Lara Estebanez	Spain	37:27	1020
23	Laura Garcia	Spain	37:49	1015
24	Nuria Etxegarai	Spain	37:59	1010
25	Ane Ochoa	Spain	38:27	1005
26	Paula Echarri	Spain	38:31	1000
27	Ainhoa Unanue	Spain	39:04	995
28	Ane Lopez	Spain	39:55	990

== See also ==
- 2023–24 World Athletics Cross Country Tour
