= Sesebo Matlapeng =

Botswana long-distance runner

Personal information
- Born: 10 January 1992 (age 33)

Sport
- Country: Botswana
- Sport: Long-distance running

Sesebo Matlapeng (born 10 January 1992) is a long-distance runner from Botswana.

In 2019, he competed in the senior men's race at the 2019 IAAF World Cross Country Championships held in Aarhus, Denmark. He finished in 55th place.
