= Ibrahim Ezzaydouni =

Spanish track and field athlete (born 1991)

Personal information
- Born: 28 April 1991 (age 34) Morocco

Sport
- Country: Spain
- Sport: Track and field
- Event: 3000 metres steeplechase

Ibrahim Ezzaydouni (born 28 April 1991) is a track and field athlete. Born in Morocco, he represents Spain internationally. In 2019, he competed in the men's 3000 metres steeplechase event at the 2019 World Athletics Championships held in Doha, Qatar. He did not qualify to compete in the final.
