= Edinah Jebitok =

Kenyan middle-distance runner

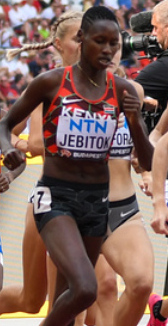
- Edinah Jebitok in 2023

Personal information
- Nationality: Kenyan
- Born: 10 November 2001 (age 24)

Sport
- Sport: Athletics
- Event: 1500 metres
Medal record
Women's athletics
Representing Kenya
World Cross Country Championships
Gold medal – first place	2023 Bathurst	Senior team

Edinah Jebitok (born 10 November 2001) is a Kenyan athlete. She competed in the women's 1500 metres event at the 2020 Summer Olympics.

She won the 8 km Great Chepsaita Cross Country in 2023 and Cintia Chepngeno was second and Janeth Chepngetich was third.

In 2025 Jebitok was issued with a two-year ban backdated to October 2024 for an anti-doping rule violation relating to whereabouts failures.
