= Atapuerca, Province of Burgos =

Coordinates: 42°22.6′N 3°30.5′W

Atapuerca
- Municipality and town
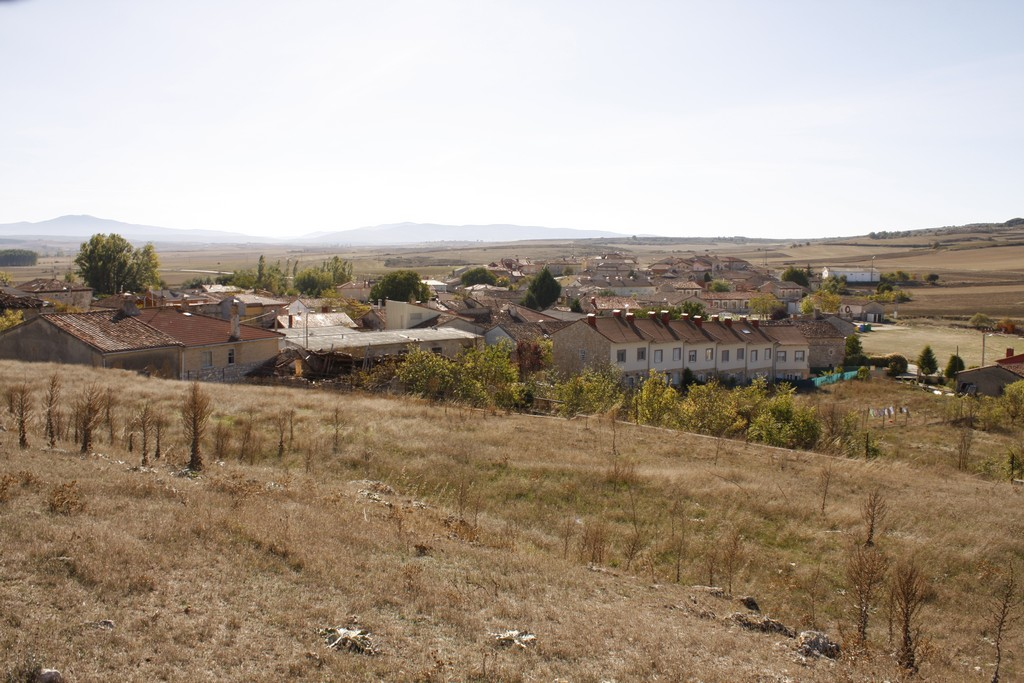
- View of Atapuerca, 2009

- Flag Coat of arms

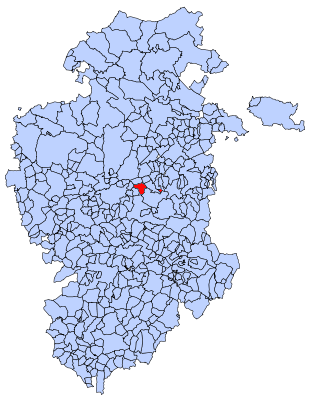
- Municipal location of Atapuerca in Burgos province
- Country: Spain
- Autonomous community: Castile and León
- Province: Burgos
- Comarca: Alfoz de Burgos

Government
  - Mayor: Raquel Torrientes Burgos (People's Party)

Area
  - Total: 24.75 km^{2} (9.56 sq mi)
- Elevation: 953 m (3,127 ft)

Population (2025-01-01)
  - Total: 178
  - Density: 7.19/km^{2} (18.6/sq mi)
- Time zone: UTC+1 (CET)
  - Summer (DST): UTC+2 (CEST)
- Postal code: 09199
- Website: www.atapuerca.es

Atapuerca (Spanish: [ataˈpweɾka]) is a municipality and town located in the province of Burgos, Castile and León, Spain. It encompasses the Archaeological Site of Atapuerca and is famous for its prehistoric archaeological sites. The municipality is made of two villages: Atapuerca (seat or capital) and Olmos de Atapuerca.

The village is the home of an Experimental Archaeology Centre (CAREX). The village also plays host to an annual cross country running event—the Cross de Atapuerca—which attracts over 2000 runners each year.

Atapuerca is on the French Way (Spanish: Camino Francés) of the Camino de Santiago. For a while the Spanish Army had an armoured tank training facility nearby.

== History ==
The massif just outside of town was the site of the Battle of Atapuerca in 1054.

In 1899, construction of a railway unveiled several significant archaeological sites at Atapuerca. The railway proved uneconomic and closed in the twentieth century.

On November 30, 2000, Atapuerca was declared a World Heritage Site by UNESCO. It is unique in Europe in allowing archaeologists to follow the evolution of the first human beings to inhabit the European continent.

== Economy ==
According to the 2005 census (INE), the municipality had a population of 195 inhabitants.

Apart from the typical dryland farming of the region, the municipality now has the economic resources generated because of the presence of the archaeological site and its associated services. 15% of the active population have a job related to tourism; since the 1990s this "tertiarization" of their economy has reversed depopulation, rejuvenating the population and placing the average age in 42 years. Directly related, the creation of employment that has been derived from this type of actions, has had a positive social impact in society.
