= Yves Nimubona =

Rwandan athlete (born 1998)

Personal information
- Nationality: Rwandan
- Born: 15 August 1998 (age 27)

Sport
- Sport: Athletics
- Event: Long-distance running

Achievements and titles
- Personal bests: 5000m: 13:14.01 (Maisons-Laffitte, 2024); 10000m: 28:02.23 (Ferrara, 2023)

Yves Nimubona (born 15 August 1998) is a Rwandan long distance runner.

== Career ==
In 2019, he won the Rwamagana Half Marathon Challenge. In June 2021, he won the half marathon event at the Kigali Peace Marathon.

He finished sixth in the 10,000 metres at the 2022 African Athletics Championships in St Pierre, Mauritius in June 2022. He finished fifth in the 5000 metres at the 2022 Commonwealth Games in Birmingham, England in August 2022. In October 2022 he won the Huye Half Marathon in the Huye District of Rwanda.

In January 2024, Nimubona became the first Rwandan male to win the Lotto Cross Cup de Hannut on the World Athletics Cross Country Tour. In April 2024, he earned a place in the 10,000 metres at the 2024 Paris Olympics due to his ranking gained on the Cross Country Tour. He subsequently competed in the 10,000 metres at the 10,000 metres race in Paris in August 2024.
