= Célestin Ndikumana =

Burundian long-distance runner

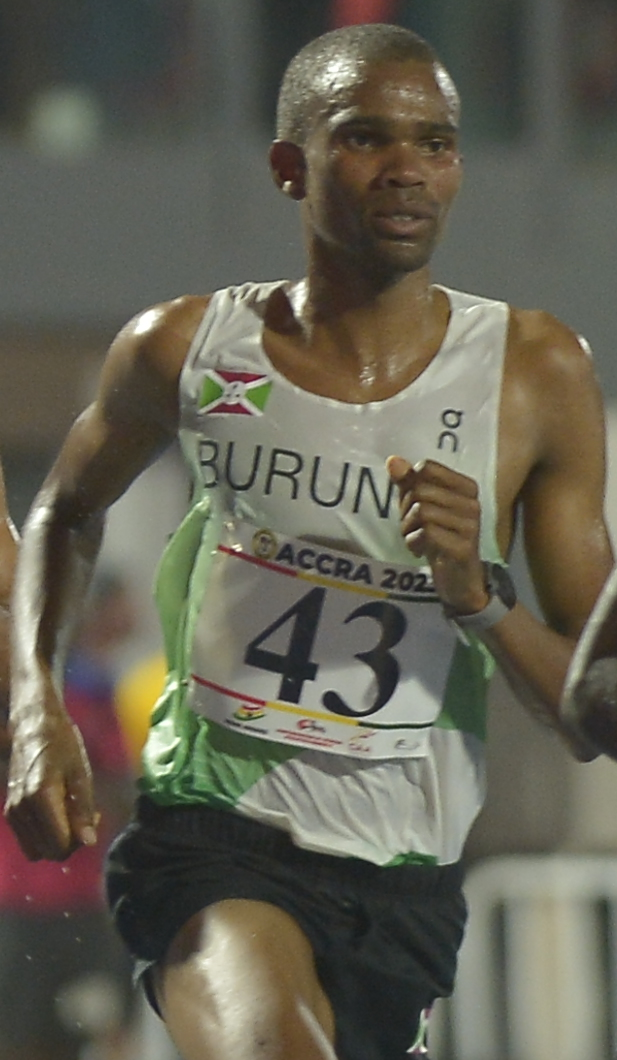
- Ndikumana at the 2023 African Games

Personal information
- Nationality: Burundian
- Born: 22 February 2002 (age 24)

Sport
- Country: Burundi
- Sport: Athletics
- Events: Long-distance running, Cross country
- Club: ATLETICA VOMANO

Célestin Ndikumana (born 22 February 2002) is a Burundian long-distance runner.

== Career ==
In February 2023, Ndikumana finished 20th in the World Athletics Cross Country Championships with a time of 30 minutes and 57 seconds. In October, he finished 15th in the 5 kilometers at the World Road Running Championships in Riga with a time of 13:36 and won the Cross Zornotza. The following March he finished fourth in the 10,000 metres at the African Games in 29:48.02 and sixth in the 5000 metres with a time of 13:45.34. He qualified for the 10,000 metres at the 2024 Summer Olympics, but did not compete in the race despite being on the startlist. In 2025, he finished 21st in the 10,000 meters at the World Championships in Tokyo with a time of 29:38.86.

== Personal bests ==
Outdoor

- 3000 metres – 7:45.02 (Celle Ligure 2023)
- 5000 metres – 13:10.93 (Shaoxing 2025)
- 10,000 metres – 27:42.94 (London 2024)

Road

- 5 kilometres – 13:36 (Riga 2023)
- 10 kilometres – 27:23 (Valencia 2025)
- Half marathon – 1:02:49 (Udine 2022)
