= Francine Niyomukunzi =

Burundian long-distance runner

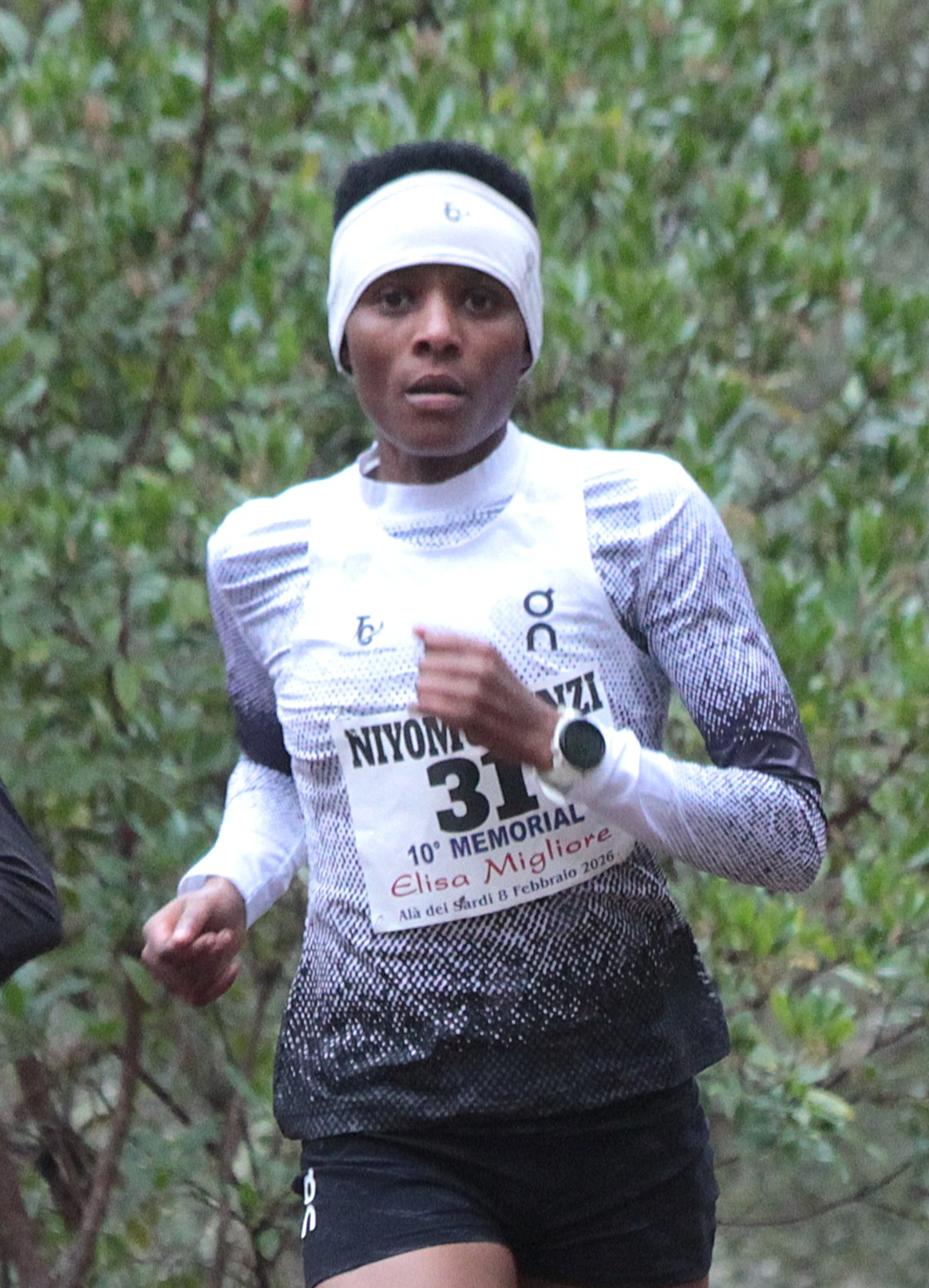

Personal information
- Born: 1 August 1999 (age 26)

Sport
- Country: Burundi
- Sport: Long-distance running

Francine Niyomukunzi (born 1 August 1999) is a Burundian long-distance runner. In 2019, she competed in the senior women's race at the 2019 IAAF World Cross Country Championships held in Aarhus, Denmark. She finished in 74th place.

In 2017, she competed in the junior women's race at the 2017 IAAF World Cross Country Championships held in Kampala, Uganda. She finished in 20th place. In 2020, she competed in the women's half marathon at the 2020 World Athletics Half Marathon Championships held in Gdynia, Poland.

In 2024, she finished 15th in the 5000 metres final at the 2024 Summer Olympics. She set a personal best of 31:17.02 in the 10000 metres, finishing in 14th.
