= List of Djiboutian records in athletics =

The following are the national records in athletics in Djibouti maintained by its national athletics federation: Fédération Djiboutienne d'Athlétisme (FDA).

== Outdoor ==
Key to tables: Awaiting ratification Record not kept by FDA

=== Men ===
Event	Record	Athlete	Date	Meet	Place	Ref.
100 m	11.39 NWI	Ismael Abdallah Ismael	24 May 2001		Forest, Belgium	
100 m	10.8 h NWI	Mohamed Gouled	29 March 1984		Djibouti, Djibouti	
200 m	22.43 NWI	Farhan Hassan Arrey	5 June 2014		Riyadh, Saudi Arabia	
200 m	23.31 NWI	Ismael Abdallah Ismael	4 August 2001		Herve, Belgium	
400 m	49.22	Fathi Moussa Robleh	20 May 2023	Arab U23 Championships	Radès, Tunisia	
800 m	1:42.97	Ayanleh Souleiman	17 July 2015	Herculis	Fontvieille, Monaco	
1000 m	2:13.49	Ayanleh Souleiman	25 August 2016	Athletissima	Lausanne, Switzerland	
1500 m	3:29.58	Ayanleh Souleiman	18 July 2014	Herculis	Fontvieille, Monaco	
Mile	3:47.32	Ayanleh Souleiman	31 May 2014	Prefontaine Classic	Eugene, United States	
3000 m	7:36.29	Mohamed Ismail Ibrahim	2 June 2024	BAUHAUS-galan	Stockholm, Sweden	
5000 m	12:56.12	Waberi Igueh Houssein	1 August 2026	IFAM Oordegem	Oordegem, Belgium	
5 km (road)	13:00	Waberi Igueh Houssein	13 December 2025	Al Sharqiyah International Race	Khobar, Saudi Arabia	
10,000 m	27:22.38	Mohamed Ismail Ibrahim	18 May 2024	Night of the 10,000m PBs	London, United Kingdom	
10 km (road)	27:16	Hani Idriss Hersi	4 October 2026	tRUNsylvania International 10K Brasov	Brașov, Romania	
15 km (road)	41:55+	Hani Idriss Hersi	20 September 2026	World Road Running Championships	Copenhagen, Denmark	
20 km (road)	56:07 +	Hani Idriss Hersi	20 September 2026	World Road Running Championships	Copenhagen, Denmark	
One hour	20220 m	Youssef Doukal	30 March 1991		La Flèche, France	
Half marathon	59:09	Hani Idriss Hersi	20 September 2026	World Road Running Championships	Copenhagen, Denmark	
25 km (road)	1:14:14+	Ibrahim Hassan	22 February 2026	Osaka Marathon	Osaka, Japan	
30 km (road)	1:29:09+	Ibrahim Hassan	22 February 2026	Osaka Marathon	Osaka, Japan	
Marathon	2:05:20	Ibrahim Hassan	22 February 2026	Osaka Marathon	Osaka, Japan	
110 m hurdles						
400 m hurdles	55.41	Houssein Nour Ali	1 May 2008	African Championships	Addis Ababa, Ethiopia	
3000 m steeplechase	8:22.17	Mohamed Ismail Ibrahim	12 June 2021		Nice, France	
High jump	1.80 m	Mahamoud Hassan	11 April 2001		Djibouti, Djibouti	
High jump	1.80 m	Bachir Abdi	11 April 2002		Djibouti, Djibouti	
Pole vault						
Long jump	6.89 m NWI	Mohamed Gouled	8 June 1985		Aubagne, France	
Triple jump	12.75 m NWI	Ahmed Ali	17 April 2008		Djibouti, Djibouti	
Shot put	12.00 m	Assoweh Aboubaker	11 November 1999		Djibouti, Djibouti	
Discus throw						
Hammer throw						
Javelin throw	36.49 m	Saad Ali Farah	18 April 2008		Djibouti, Djibouti	
Decathlon						
Decathlon	100m (wind) / Long jump (wind) / Shot put / High jump / 400m / 110m H (wind) / Discus / Pole vault / Javelin / 1500m					
20 km walk (road)						
50 km walk (road)						
4 × 100 m relay	45.6 h	Djibouti; F. Hassan; S. D. Iltireh; A. A. Abdi; S. H. Ibrahim	30 May 2013		Ali Sabieh, Djibouti	
4 × 400 m relay	3:28.4 h	Djibouti; Houssein Nour Ali; Djama; Iscander; Mahamoud Farah	19 April 2008		Djibouti, Djibouti	

=== Women ===
Event	Record	Athlete	Date	Meet	Place	Ref.
100 m	13.45 NWI	Fathia Ali Bouraleh	30 April 2008	African Championships	Addis Ababa, Ethiopia	
200 m	27.83 (+1.2 m/s)	Hasna Idriss Goumanes	25 March 2017	2nd International Djibouti Meet	Djibouti City, Djibouti	
400 m	59.79	Mariam Isman Waïss	15 March 2019		Djibouti City, Djibouti	
800 m	2:05.12	Souhra Ali Mohamed	26 August 2019		Rabat, Morocco	
1500 m	4:12.53	Souhra Ali Mohamed	17 March 2023	Meeting International Djibouti	Djibouti City, Djibouti	
Mile	4:41.17	Souhra Ali Mohamed	10 June 2023	Fast 5000	Montesson, France	
3000 m	9:08.60	Djama Habon Ahmed	14 September 2020		Djibouti City, Djibouti	
5000 m	14:45.93	Samiyah Hassan Nour	22 July 2025	Folksam Grand Prix Varberg	Varberg, Sweden	
5 km (road)	14:38 Mx	Samiyah Hassan Nour	4 April 2026	Urban Trail de Lille	Lille, France	
5 km (road)	15:04 Wo	Samiyah Hassan Nour	19 September 2026	World Road Running Championships	Copenhagen, Denmark	
10,000 m	32:17.72	Samiyah Hassan Nour	17 November 2025	Islamic Solidarity Games	Riyadh, Saudi Arabia	
10 km (road)	30:37 Wo	Samiyah Hassan Nour	4 October 2026	tRUNsylvania International 10K Brasov	Brașov, Romania	
Half marathon	1:18:50	Djama Haboon Ahmed	24 June 2023	Arab Championships	Marrakech, Morocco	
Marathon						
100 m hurdles	19.3 NWI	Kadra Ahmed Saleh	25 April 2009		Addis Ababa, Ethiopia	
400 m hurdles	1:20.1 NWI	Saredo Iltireh	19 April 2008		Djibouti City, Djibouti	
3000 m steeplechase						
High jump	1.30 m	Neima Awaleh Ahmed	8 May 2003		Djibouti City, Djibouti	
Pole vault						
Long jump	4.75 m NWI	Fatouma Abdallah Mohamed	9 May 2006		Khartoum, Sudan	
Triple jump						
Shot put	9.45 m	Fimiro Aden Okieh	20 May 2000		Djibouti City, Djibouti	
Discus throw	22.30 m	Ikram Ali Ahmed	18 April 2008		Djibouti City, Djibouti	
Hammer throw						
Javelin throw	31.86 m	Ikram Ali Ahmed	18 April 2008		Djibouti City, Djibouti	
Heptathlon						
Heptathlon	100m H (wind) / High jump / Shot put / 200m (wind) / Long jump (wind) / Javelin / 800m					
20 km walk (road)						
4 × 100 m relay	56.9 h	Djibouti; Mar. Djibril; Mal. Djibril; I. Ali; Fathia Ali Bouraleh	18 April 2008		Djibouti City, Djibouti	
4 × 400 m relay	4:58.6 h	Djibouti; A. Miguil; Kadra Ahmed Saleh; Mar. Idriss; M. Ali	19 April 2008		Djibouti City, Djibouti	

== Indoor ==
=== Men ===
Event	Record	Athlete	Date	Meet	Place	Ref.
60 m	8.12	Dia-Undine Ahmed Ali	2 December 2018		Bordeaux, France	
200 m						
400 m						
800 m	1:46.97+	Ayanleh Souleiman	17 February 2016	Globen Galan	Stockholm, Sweden	
1000 m	2:14.20	Ayanleh Souleiman	17 February 2016	Globen Galan	Stockholm, Sweden	
1500 m	3:36.13	Ayanleh Souleiman	8 February 2013	PSD Bank Meeting	Düsseldorf, Germany	
1500 m	3:35.2 h	Ayanleh Souleiman	6 February 2014	XL Galan	Stockholm, Sweden	
3000 m	7:39.81 (Note: outdoor mark ratified as absolute record)	Ayanleh Souleiman	10 February 2013		Ghent, Belgium	
60 m hurdles						
High jump						
Pole vault						
Long jump						
Triple jump						
Shot put						
Heptathlon						
Heptathlon	60m / Long jump / Shot put / High jump / 60m H / Pole vault / 1000m					
5000 m walk						
4 × 400 m relay						

=== Women ===
Event	Record	Athlete	Date	Meet	Place	Ref.
60 m						
200 m						
400 m						
800 m						
1500 m						
3000 m						
60 m hurdles						
High jump						
Pole vault						
Long jump	3.77 m	Samah Mohamed Ali	7 December 2019		Lille, France	
Triple jump						
Shot put						
Pentathlon						
Pentathlon	60m H / High jump / Shot put / Long jump / 800m					
3000 m walk						
4 × 400 m relay						
