= 2024 African Championships in Athletics – Men's 10,000 metres =

Men's 10,000 metres at the 2024 African Championships in Athletics
- Venue: Japoma Stadium
- Location: Douala, Cameroon
- Dates: 22 June
- Competitors: 11 from 7 nations
- Winning time: 28:52.27

Medalists
| gold medal | Nibret Melak | Ethiopia |
| silver medal | Gemechu Dida | Ethiopia |
| bronze medal | Roncer Konga | Kenya |

The men's 10,000 metres event at the 2024 African Championships in Athletics was held on 22 June in Douala, Cameroon.

== Records ==
Records before the 2024 African Athletics Championships
| Record | Athlete (nation) | Time (s) | Location | Date |
|---|---|---|---|---|
| World record | Joshua Cheptegei (UGA) | 26:11.00 | Valencia, Spain | 7 October 2020 |
| African record | Joshua Cheptegei (UGA) | 26:11.00 | Valencia, Spain | 7 October 2020 |
| Championship record | Kenneth Kipkemoi (KEN) | 27:19.74 | Porto-Novo, Benin | 28 June 2012 |
| World leading | Yomif Kejelcha (ETH) | 26:31.01 | Nerja, Spain | 14 June 2024 |
| African leading | Yomif Kejelcha (ETH) | 26:31.01 | Nerja, Spain | 14 June 2024 |

== Results ==
| Rank | Athlete | Nationality | Time | Notes |
|---|---|---|---|---|
| 1st place, gold medalist(s) | Nibret Melak | Ethiopia | 28:52.27 | |
| 2nd place, silver medalist(s) | Gemechu Dida | Ethiopia | 28:52.79 | |
| 3rd place, bronze medalist(s) | Roncer Konga | Kenya | 28:52.94 | |
| 4 | Joseph Kiptum | Kenya | 28:59.49 | |
| 5 | Francis Abong | Kenya | 29:08.24 | |
| 6 | William Amponsah | Ghana | 29:08.57 | |
| 7 | Hani Idriss Hersi | Djibouti | 29:12.80 | |
| 8 | Elie Sindayikegera | Burundi | 29:38.61 | |
| 9 | Ishmael Arthur | Ghana | 29:46.96 | |
| 10 | Pierre Tchoga | Cameroon | 31:34.94 | |
| 11 | Bienvenue Zepou | Chad | 33:58.38 | |

== See also ==
- Athletics at the 2023 African Games – Men's 10,000 metres
