= 10K run world record progression =

The following tables show the progression of world bests and world records in the 10K run, as recognised by the IAAF. The 10K run was introduced as a part of world record events in 2003.

== Men ==
=== World bests (prior to IAAF recognition) ===
Time	Athlete	Date	Place	Ref
30:29	Robert Drake (USA)	24 November 1962	Los Angeles, United States	
30:26	William Morgan (USA)	11 October 1964	Oakland, United States	
29:52	Ian Blackwood (AUS)	December 1966	Melbourne, Australia	
29:23	Toshiaki Kamata (JPN)	27 December 1970	Hōfu, Japan	
28:56	Kunimitsu Itō (JPN)	22 December 1974	Hōfu, Japan	
28:35	Bill Rodgers (USA)	20 November 1976	Birmingham, United States	
28:24	Greg Meyer (USA)	24 June 1979	Boston, United States	
28:00	Matthews Motswarateu (BOT)	4 October 1980	Purchase, NY, USA	
27:43	Zackariah Barie (TAN)	3 March 1984	Phoenix, AZ, USA	
27:41	Arturo Barrios (MEX)	1 March 1986	Phoenix, AZ, USA	
27:40	Addis Abebe (ETH)	24 January 1993	Jakarta, Indonesia	
27:37	Tendai Chimusasa (ZIM)	25 April 1993	Wurzburg, Germany	
27:34	Haile Gebreselasie (ETH)	4 April 1994	Dongio, Switzerland	
27:34	William Sigei (KEN)	4 April 1994	Dongio, Switzerland	
27:20	Joseph Kimani (KEN)	5 May 1996	Cleveland, OH, USA	
27:18	Sammy Kipketer (KEN)	8 April 2001	Brunssum, Netherlands	

=== World records ===
Key:

Ratified
Not ratified
Ratified but later rescinded
Pending ratification

Time	Athlete	Date	Place	Ref
27:02	Haile Gebreselasie (ETH)	11 December 2002	Doha, Qatar	
27:01	Micah Kogo Kemboi (KEN)	29 March 2009	Brunssum, Netherlands	
26:44	Leonard Patrick Komon (KEN)	26 September 2010	Utrecht, Netherlands	
26:38	Joshua Cheptegei (UGA)	1 December 2019	Valencia, Spain	
26:24	Rhonex Kipruto (KEN)	12 January 2020	Valencia, Spain	
26:31	Yomif Kejelcha (ETH)	16 February 2025	Castellón de la Plana, Spain	

== Women ==
=== World bests (prior to IAAF recognition) ===
Time	Athlete	Date	Place	Ref
37:21	Mary Slaney-Decker (USA)	18 April 1971	Lakewood, California	
37:09.4	Lone Dybdal (DEN)	31 March 1973	Haderslev	
35:42	Thelma Wright (CAN)	3 November 1974	Guayanilla, Puerto Rico	
35:36	Peg Neppel (USA)	12 September 1976	San Francisco	
34:51	Julie Shea (USA)	10 October 1976	Washington D.C.	
33:49	Marijke Moser (SUI)	19 May 1977	Bern	
32:33	Loa Olafsson (DEN)	25 February 1978	Copenhagen	
32:02	Grete Waitz (NOR)	26 January 1980	Hamilton, Bermuda	
31:41	Grete Waitz (NOR)	30 January 1982	Hamilton, Bermuda	
31:32	Grete Waitz (NOR)	15 January 1983	Miami, FL, USA	
31:25	Ingrid Kristiansen (NOR)	6 May 1984	Oslo, Norway	
31:07	Liz McColgan (GBR)	21 February 1987	Orlando, FL, USA	
30:59	Liz McColgan (GBR)	6 February 1988	Orlando, FL, USA	
30:39	Liz McColgan (GBR)	11 March 1989	Orlando, FL, USA	
30:29	Asmae Leghzaoui (MAR)	8 June 2002	New York, USA	

=== World records - races with women only ===
Time	Athlete	Date	Place	Ref
30:29	Asmae Leghzaoui (MAR)	8 June 2002	New York City, United States	
30:01	Agnes Tirop (KEN)	12 September 2021	Herzogenaurach, Germany	
29:24	Agnes Ngetich (KEN)	10 September 2023	Brașov, Romania	
29:26	Agnes Ngetich (KEN)	18 November 2023	Lille, France	
29:27	Agnes Ngetich (KEN)	26 April 2025	Herzogenaurach, Germany	

=== World records - races with both men and women ===
Time	Athlete	Date	Place	Ref
30:21	Paula Radcliffe (GBR)	23 February 2003	San Juan, Puerto Rico	
29:43	Joyciline Jepkosgei (KEN)	9 September 2017	Prague, Czech Republic	
29:38	Kalkidan Gezahegne (BHN)	3 October 2021	Geneva, Switzerland	
29:14	Yalemzerf Yehualaw (ETH)	27 February 2022	Castellon, Spain	
28:46	Agnes Ngetich (KEN)	14 January 2024	Valencia, Spain	
