= Emeline Imanizabayo =

Rwanadan athlete (born 1996)

Personal information
- Born: 1 January 1996 (age 30)

Sport
- Sport: Athletics
- Event: Long distance running
Medal record
Women's athletics
Representing Rwanda
African Championships
| Gold medal – first place | 2026 Accra | 5000 m |

Emeline Imanizabayo (born 1 January 1996) is a Rwandan long-distanced runner. She won the gold medal over 5000 metres at the 2026 African Championships.

== Biography ==
In March 2024, Imanizabayo ran 15:56.20 to place eighth over 5000 metres at the 2024 African Games in Accra, Ghana. In July 2025, she won the 5000 metres title at the Rwandan Championships, running 16:01.50 in Kigali.

In March 2026, Imanizabayo set a Rwandan national record in Lisbon with a time of 67.35 for the half marathon. In April 2026, Imanizabayo set a Rwandan national record in the 10k run of 30:39 while competing in Lille, France, placing sixth in the race. Later that month, she won over 5km on the road at the Seven Hills Record Run in Nijmegen, Netherlands. The following month, she won the gold medal over 5000 metres at the 2026 African Championships in Accra, Ghana, winning with a time of 23:25.92, ahead of Samiyah Hassan Nour of Djibouti. The win marked her country’s first-ever gold medal at the African Championships. In July 2026, she placed ninth in the 5000 metres at the 2026 Commonwealth Games in Glasgow, Scotland. Imanizabayo competed in the women's half marathon at the 2026 World Athletics Road Running Championships in Copenhagen, Denmark, finishing fifteenth overall with a time of 1:08:02.
