= 5K run =

Road running competition

Athletics 5K run
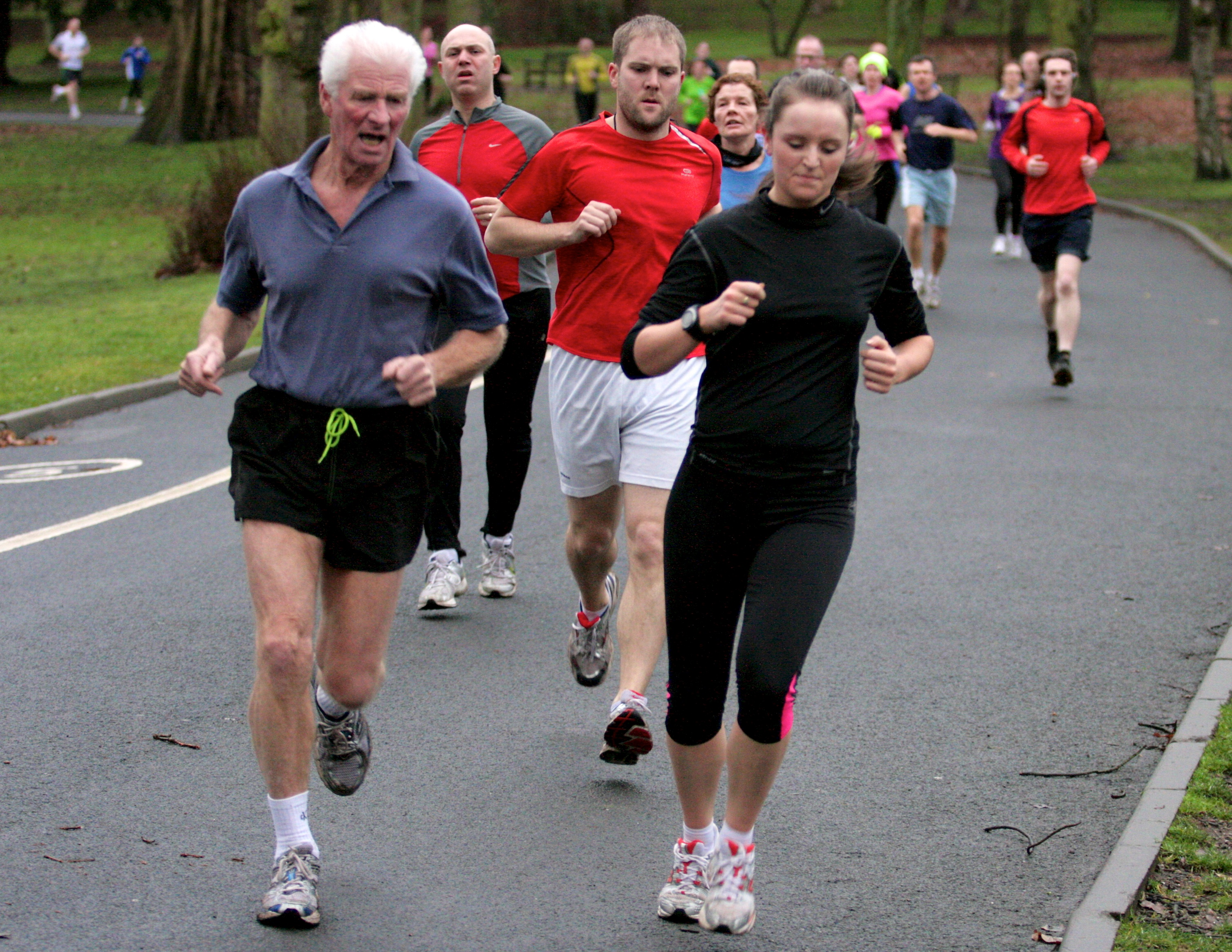
- Runners during a 5k parkrun in Cannon Hill Park, United Kingdom

World records
- Men: Berihu Aregawi 12:49 (2021)
- Women: Beatrice Chebet 14:13 Wo (2023); Beatrice Chebet 13:54 Mx (2024)

The 5K run is a long-distance road running competition over a distance of five kilometres (3.107 mi). Also referred to as the 5K road race, 5 km, or simply 5K, it is the shortest of the most common road running distances. It is usually distinguished from the 5000 metres track running event by stating the distance in kilometres, rather than metres.

Among road running events, the 5K distance is mostly popular with novice or infrequent runners or joggers as it is comparatively easier to complete the distance without endurance training. The 5K distance also makes the distance suitable for people looking to improve or maintain their general physical fitness, rather than develop long-distance running abilities. The brevity of the distance means that less time is required to take part in the activity and that people from a wide range of ages and abilities may participate. From a physiological perspective, five kilometres is towards the low end of endurance running.

The combination of the activity's simplicity, its low cost, and medium exercise intensity mean that it is often recommended by medical organisations and healthcare professionals. Like all physical activity, regular 5K runs can improve cardiovascular function, as well as having mental health benefits (see runner's high).

== Events ==
Similar to other road running events, many organised 5K running events incorporate an element of charity running. Runners may elect to raise money for a chosen charity on the condition of their completion of the race. Raising money for charity is typically optional, with other participants running for pleasure. The 5K distance is particularly popular among women and a number of annual women-only races are organised over the 5K distance. Running USA's 2012 analysis of participation in American road races showed that 58% of participants in 5K races were women. The race participation contrasts with women's participation in sport in general and in longer distance races particularly, where the same report showed the gender bias was reversed.

The Hot Chocolate 5K in Chicago and the Mercedes-Benz Corporate Run in Miami are the largest organised 5K runs in the United States, having attracted over 20,000 and over 16,000 runners, respectively, in 2012. The number of runners ranked the Hot Chocolate 5K as the 20th largest road running event of any distance in the United States that year. There are several prominent 5K race series, including The Color Run, an international, mass participation, city-based series involving coloured water showers, and the parkrun series, which is a worldwide network of free-to-enter, volunteer-led races occurring each weekend, originating in the United Kingdom.

Unlike longer road races, such as the 10K run and marathon, the 5K distance is not commonly contested by elite distance runners. The Carlsbad 5000 is one of the few races that attract competitive elite fields and saw several world bests for the distance prior to the IAAF's 2018 decision to begin recognising world records for the 5K.

Another annual American race, Freihofer's Run for Women, also regularly has elite women competing in the road distance, as does the BOClassic in Italy. Elite racing almost exclusively takes place on the track for this distance.

There is no official world championship event organised for the 5 km road distance. Championships over 5 km are held nationally in some areas, including the United States and England. An annual North American 5K Championships was created in 2002, but the competition ceased after 2005.

== Records ==
The 5 km road distance was introduced by IAAF as a world record event in November 2017, with the inaugural record to be recognised after 1 January 2018 if the performances were equal to or better than 13:10 for men and 14:45 for women. Other statistical organisations, including the Association of Road Racing Statisticians, record best times for the event. Records for the 5K are often noted in national records in athletics.

=== Area records ===
- Updated 4 October 2026.

Area	Men			Women		
Area	Time	Season	Athlete	Time	Season	Athlete
World	12:49	2021	Berihu Aregawi (ETH)	13:54 Mx	2024	Beatrice Chebet (KEN)
Area records
Africa (records)	12:49	2021	Berihu Aregawi (ETH)	13:54 Mx	2024	Beatrice Chebet (KEN)
Asia (records)	13:05	2023	Birhanu Balew (BHR)	none		
Europe (records)	12:51	2026	Jimmy Gressier (FRA)	14:33 Mx	2026	Diane van Es (NED)
North, Central America and Caribbean (records)	13:14	2026	Drew Hunter (USA)	14:50	2015	Molly Huddle (USA)
Oceania (records)	13:04	2026	Ky Robinson (AUS)	14:48	2013	Kim Smith (NZL)
South America (records)	12:57	2025	Santiago Catrofe (URU)	15:39	1992	Carmem de Oliveira (BRA)

== All-time top 25 ==
- + = en route to longer performance

=== Men ===
- Correct as of April 2026.

Rank	Time	Athlete	Nation	Date	Race	Place	Ref.
1	12:49	Berihu Aregawi	Ethiopia	31 December 2021	Cursa dels Nassos	Barcelona	
2	12:50	Yomif Kejelcha	Ethiopia	19 March 2023		Lille	
3	12:51	Joshua Cheptegei	Uganda	16 February 2020	Monaco Run 5K	Monaco	
3	12:51	Jimmy Gressier	France	4 April 2026	Urban Trail de Lille	Lille	
5	12:54	Addisu Yihune	Ethiopia	4 April 2026	Urban Trail de Lille	Lille	
6	12:55	Nicholas Kimeli	Kenya	30 April 2022	Adizero: Road to Records	Herzogenaurach	
7	12:56	Yann Schrub	France	4 April 2026	Urban Trail de Lille	Lille	
8	12:57	Santiago Catrofe	Uruguay	16 March 2025		Lille	
9	12:58	Hagos Gebrhiwet	Ethiopia	14 December 2024	Al Sharqiyah International 5km	Khobar, Saudi Arabia	
9	12:58	Kuma Girma	Ethiopia	14 December 2024	Al Sharqiyah International 5km	Khobar, Saudi Arabia	
11	13:00	Sammy Kipketer	Kenya	26 March 2000	Carlsbad 5000	Carlsbad	
11	13:00	Sammy Kipketer	Kenya	1 April 2001	Carlsbad 5000	Carlsbad	
11	13:00	Harbert Kibet	Uganda	3 May 2025	Asics Tokyo Speed Race	Tokyo	
11	13:00	Waberi Igueh Houssein	Djibouti	13 December 2025	Al Sharqiyah International Race	Khobar	
11	13:00	Yismaw Dillu	Ethiopia	13 December 2025	Al Sharqiyah International Race	Khobar	
15	13:01	Mezgebu Sime	Ethiopia	14 December 2024	Al Sharqiyah International 5km	Khobar, Saudi Arabia	
15	13:01	Mezgebu Sime	Ethiopia	13 December 2025	Al Sharqiyah International Race	Khobar	
16	13:02	Levy Kibet	Kenya	30 April 2022	Adizero: Road to Records	Herzogenaurach	
16	13:02	Gemechu Godana	Ethiopia	4 April 2026	Urban Trail de Lille	Lille	
18	13:03	Andrew Alamisi	Kenya	26 April 2025	Adizero: Road to Records	Herzogenaurach	
19	13:04	Reynold Cheruiyot	Kenya	19 March 2023		Lille	
19	13:04	Biniam Mehary	Ethiopia	9 December 2023	Annual Charity Run	Khobar, Saudi Arabia	
19	13:04	Addisu Yihune	Ethiopia	16 March 2025		Lille	
22	13:05	Birhanu Balew	Bahrain	9 December 2023	Annual Charity Run	Khobar, Saudi Arabia	
22	13:05	Andreas Almgren	Sweden	5 April 2025	Drammen 10K-5K	Drammen, Norway	
24	13:06	Jacob Krop	Kenya	12 September 2021	Road to Records	Herzogenaurach	
24	13:06	Maxime Chaumeton	South Africa	4 April 2026	Urban Trail de Lille	Lille	

==== Notes ====
Below is a list of other times equal or superior to 13:06:

- Berihu Aregawi also ran 12:52 (2021), 12:59 (2021).
- Yomif Kejelcha also ran 12:53 (2022), 12:54 (2025), 13:00 (2024), 13:02 (2023), 13:06 (2023).
- Jimmy Gressier also ran 12:57 (2025).
- Hagos Gebrhiwet also ran 12:59 (2023).
- Yann Schrub also ran 13:00 (2025).
- Addisu Yihune also ran 13:04 (2025), 13:05 (2024).
- Andrew Alamisi also ran 13:06 (2024).

=== Women ===
- Correct as of April 2026.

Rank	Time	Athlete	Nation	Date	Race	Place	Ref.
1	13:54 Mx	Beatrice Chebet	Kenya	31 December 2024	Cursa dels Nassos	Barcelona	
2	14:13+ Mx	Agnes Ngetich	Kenya	14 January 2024	10K Valencia Ibercaja	Valencia	
3	14:14+ Mx	Emmaculate Acholi	Kenya	14 January 2024	10K Valencia Ibercaja	Valencia	
4	14:15 Mx	Marta Alemayo	Ethiopia	4 April 2026	Urban Trail de Lille	Lille	
5	14:19 Mx	Ejgayehu Taye	Ethiopia	31 December 2021	Cursa dels Nassos	Barcelona	
5	14:19 Mx	Caroline Nyaga	Kenya	3 May 2025	Asics Tokyo Speed Race	Tokyo	
7	14:22 Mx	Hawi Abera	Ethiopia	4 April 2026	Urban Trail de Lille	Lille	
8	14:23 Mx	Medina Eisa	Ethiopia	31 December 2024	Cursa dels Nassos	Barcelona	
8	14:23 Mx	Likina Amebaw	Ethiopia	31 December 2025	Cursa dels Nassos	Barcelona	
10	14:24 Mx	Yenenesh Shimeket	Ethiopia	4 April 2026	Urban Trail de Lille	Lille	
11	14:25+ Mx	Lilian Kasait Rengeruk	Kenya	14 January 2024	10K Valencia Ibercaja	Valencia	
12	14:28+ Mx	Yalemzerf Yehualaw	Ethiopia	27 February 2022	Castellón 10K	Castellón de la Plana	
12	14:28 Wo	Joy Cheptoyek	Uganda	31 December 2023	Cursa dels Nassos	Barcelona	
14	14:29 Wo	Senbere Teferi	Ethiopia	12 September 2021	Road to Records	Herzogenaurach	
14	14:29+ Mx	Prisca Chesang	Uganda	31 December 2022	San Silvestre Vallecana	Madrid	
16	14:30	Hirut Meshesha	Ethiopia	16 March 2025		Lille	
17	14:32+	Joyciline Jepkosgei	Kenya	9 September 2017	Birell Prague Grand Prix	Prague	
17	14:32 Mx	Nadia Battocletti	Italy	3 May 2025	Asics Tokyo Speed Race	Tokyo	
19	14:35	Mekides Abebe	Ethiopia	19 March 2023		Lille	
19	14:35 (Note: Ngetich's women's-only record was not certified after World Athletics determined the course was 25 meters too short.) + Wo	Catherine Reline	Kenya	10 September 2023	Brașov Running Festival	Brașov	
21	14:36 Mx	Belinda Chemutai	Uganda	31 December 2024	Cursa dels Nassos	Barcelona	
22	14:38+ Mx	Degitu Azimeraw	Ethiopia	31 December 2021	San Silvestre Vallecana	Madrid	
22	14:38+ Mx	Edinah Jebitok	Kenya	31 December 2021	San Silvestre Vallecana	Madrid	
22	14:38 Mx	Edinah Jebitok	Kenya	17 March 2024		Lille	
22	14:38 Mx	Samiyah Hassan Nour	Djibouti	4 April 2026	Urban Trail de Lille	Lille	
25	14:39 Mx	Dawit Seyaum	Ethiopia	6 November 2021	Urban Trail Lille event	Lille	
25	14:39 Mx	Diane van Es	Netherlands	9 February 2025	MonacoRun 5K	Monaco	
—	14:39 Mx (Note: uncertified course)	Karoline Bjerkeli Grøvdal	Norway	1 May 2021		Sør-Odal	

==== Notes ====
Below is a list of other times equal or superior to 14:39:

- Beatrice Chebet also ran 14:13 Wo (2023) and 14:35 Wo (2023).
- Ejgayehu Taye also ran 14:21 Mx (2022, 2023).
- Agnes Ngetich also run 14:25 + Wo (Note: Ngetich's women's-only record was not certified after World Athletics determined the course was 25 meters too short.) + Wo (2023).
- Lilian Kasait Rengeruk also ran 14:26 Wo (2023), and 14:39 Wo (2023).
- Hawi Abera also ran 14:32 Mx (2025).
- Likina Amebaw also ran 14:33 Mx, 14:35 (2024), 14:38 (2025).
- Caroline Nyaga also ran 14:35 (2023).
- Senbere Teferi also ran 14:37 (2022).
- Medina Eisa also ran 14:38 Wo (2024).
