= 10K Valencia =

Annual race in Spain since 2009

- Date: January
- Location: Valencia, Valencian Community, Spain
- Event type: Road
- Distance: 10K, 5K
- Established: 2009 (17 years ago)
- Website: https://www.10kvalencia.com

The 10K Valencia (Catalan: 10K València; also known as the 10K Valencia Ibercaja for sponsorship reasons) is an annual road-based 10K run hosted by Valencia, Spain, since 2009. The marathon is a World Athletics Label Road Race and a member of the Association of International Marathons and Distance Races. A 5K race is also held on the same day.

Kenyan runner Rhonex Kipruto set a world record for the 10K run during this race in 2020 with a time of 26:24, as did Kenyan runner Agnes Ngetich in the 2024 edition with a time of 28:46. The Swedish runner Andreas Almgren ran the current European Record in the 2026 edition in a time of 26:45.

== Course ==
External image
- Course map of 10K in 2024

The race is run on a loop course, with roughly the first and last 700 m (2,300 ft) being run on the same section of road, but in different directions.

== See also ==
- Valencia Half Marathon
