= Athletics at the 2023 African Games – Men's 10,000 metres =

Men's 10,000 metres at the 2023 African Games
- Venue: Legon Sports Stadium
- Location: Accra, Ghana
- Dates: 19 March
- Competitors: 18 from 11 nations
- Winning time: 29:45.37

Medalists
gold medal	Nibret Melak	Ethiopia
silver medal	Gemechu Dida	Ethiopia
bronze medal	Evans Kiptum	Kenya

The men's 10,000 metres event at the 2023 African Games was held on 19 March 2024 in Accra, Ghana.

== Results ==
Rank	Name	Nationality	Time	Notes
1st place, gold medalist(s)	Nibret Melak	Ethiopia	29:45.37	
2nd place, silver medalist(s)	Gemechu Dida	Ethiopia	29:45.68	
3rd place, bronze medalist(s)	Evans Kiptum	Kenya	29:47.61	
4	Célestin Ndikumana	Burundi	29:48.02	
5	William Amponsah	Ghana	29:50.99	NR
6	Seare Dawit	Eritrea	29:53.81	
7	Hailemariyam Amare Tegegn	Ethiopia	29:57.39	
8	Merhawi Mebrahtu	Eritrea	30:02.26	
9	Peter Mwaniki	Kenya	30:07.26	
10	Emilie Hafashimana	Burundi	30:12.66	
11	Mohamed Ismail Ibrahim	Djibouti	30:12.76	
12	Filmon Kibrom	Eritrea	30:29.90	
13	Sougueh Aden Houssein	Djibouti	30:31.57	
14	Peter Qambaway	Tanzania	30:34.19	
15	Wellington Varevi	Zimbabwe	30:38.70	
16	António Teko	Angola	30:56.45	
17	Abubakarr Conteh	Sierra Leone	31:37.95	
18	Aniceto Oyono Ndong	Equatorial Guinea	33:34.29	
	Mumin Gala	Djibouti	DNS	
