= Djibouti at the 2019 African Games =

- Flag of Djibouti
- IOC code: DJI
- NOC: Comité National Olympique Djiboutien

in Rabat, Morocco 19 August 2019 – 31 August 2019
- Competitors: 31 (24 men and 7 women) in 9 sports
- Medals Ranked 33rd: Gold 0 Silver 1 Bronze 1 Total 2

African Games appearances (overview)
- 2011; 2015; 2019; 2023

Djibouti competed at the 2019 African Games held from 19 to 31 August 2019 in Rabat, Morocco. In total, athletes representing Djibouti won one silver medal and one bronze medal and the country finished in 33rd place in the medal table.

== Medal summary ==
=== Medal table ===
Medal	Name	Sport	Event	Date
Silver	Ayanleh Souleiman	Athletics	Men's 1500 metres	30 August
Bronze	Aden-Alexandre Houssein	Judo	Men's -73 kg	17 August

Medals by sport
Sport	1st place, gold medalist(s)	2nd place, silver medalist(s)	3rd place, bronze medalist(s)	Total
Athletics	0	1	0	1
Judo	0	0	1	1
Total	0	1	1	2

Medals by date
Day	Date	1st place, gold medalist(s)	2nd place, silver medalist(s)	3rd place, bronze medalist(s)	Total
2	17 August	0	0	1	1
15	30 August	0	1	0	1
Total		0	1	1	2

== Athletics ==
Djibouti competed in several events in athletics.

Ayanleh Souleiman won the silver medal in the men's 1500 metres event, the only medal won by an athlete representing Djibouti in athletics.

Youssouf Hiss Bachir also competed in the men's 1500 metres event and he did not finish in the final.

Souhra Ali Med competed in the women's 800 metres event. She qualified to advance to the final where she finished in last place.

Kadra Mohamed Dembil competed in the women's 1500 metres event and she finished in 11th place in the final.

Mohamed Ismail Ibrahim competed in the men's 3000 metres steeplechase event. He finished in 8th place.

Two athletes competed in the men's 5000 metres event: Bouh Ibrahim and Jamal Abdi Direh. They finished in 8th and 14th place respectively.

Mumin Gala competed in the men's half marathon event and did not finish.

== Canoeing ==
Abdoul-hakim Daoud Abdi competed in the men's K-1 200 metres event. He was also scheduled to compete in the men's K-1 1000 metres event but he did not start.

== Chess ==
Mohamed Ali Djama, Idriss Elmi Barkhadleh and Hana Abdallah Hassan were scheduled to compete in chess but they did not compete in their events.

== Judo ==
Four athletes represented Djibouti competed in judo:

- Abdoulgabar Abdourahman Omar (Men's -90 kg)
- Raguib Abdourahman (Women's -52 kg)
- Aden-Alexandre Houssein (Men's -73 kg)
- Moustapha Fouad Hamid (Men's -60 kg)

Aden-Alexandre Houssein won one the bronze medals in the Men's -73 kg event.

== Karate ==
Kaled Amer Abdoul-Aziz (men's kumite -60kg) competed in karate.

== Rowing ==
Yahya Djireh Djama competed in the men's lightweight single sculls 500 metres event.

== Swimming ==
Houssein Gaber Ibrahim competed in the men's 50 metre freestyle and men's 100 metre freestyle events.

Safia Houssein Barkat competed in the women's 50 metre breaststroke and women's 50 metre freestyle events.

== Table tennis ==
Djibouti competed in table tennis.

Bouhran Abdourazak Abdallah, Djamal Ahmed Mohamed and Mohamed Houmed Saido competed in the men's singles event. They also competed in the men's team event. Mohamed and Saido also competed in the men's doubles event.

Rahma Abdourahman Houssein competed in the women's singles event.

== Taekwondo ==
Two athletes competed in Taekwondo.

Athlete	Event	Round of 32	Round of 16	Quarterfinals	Semifinals	Final	
Athlete	Event	Opposition Result	Opposition Result	Opposition Result	Opposition Result	Opposition Result	Rank
Radwan Houssein Hassan	Men's –54 kg	—N/a	Coulibaly (MLI); L 3–27	did not advance			
Abdi-kader Robleh Omar	Men's –58 kg	Chol (SSD); W 34–2	Diakite (CIV); L 2–39	did not advance			
