= Djibouti at the African Games =

- Flag of Djibouti
- IOC code: DJI
- NOC: Comité National Olympique Djiboutien

African Games appearances (overview)
- 2011; 2015; 2019; 2023

Djibouti competed at several editions of the African Games. Djibouti first competed at the 2011 All-Africa Games held in Maputo, Mozambique. The country did not win a medal on this occasion.

The nation won its first medal in 2015, at the African Games held in Brazzaville, Republic of the Congo. Abdi Waiss Mouhyadin won the silver medal in the men's 1500 metres event.

Four years later, Djibouti also won a medal in the same athletics event: Ayanleh Souleiman won the silver medal in the men's 1500 metres at the 2019 African Games. Judoka Aden-Alexandre Houssein also won one of the bronze medals in the men's 73 kg event.

== Medal record ==
| Games | Gold | Silver | Bronze | Total |
|---|---|---|---|---|
| 2011 | 0 | 0 | 0 | 0 |
| 2015 | 0 | 1 | 0 | 1 |
| 2019 | 0 | 1 | 1 | 2 |
| Totals (3 entries) | 0 | 2 | 1 | 3 |
