= Nibret Melak =

Ethiopian long-distance runner

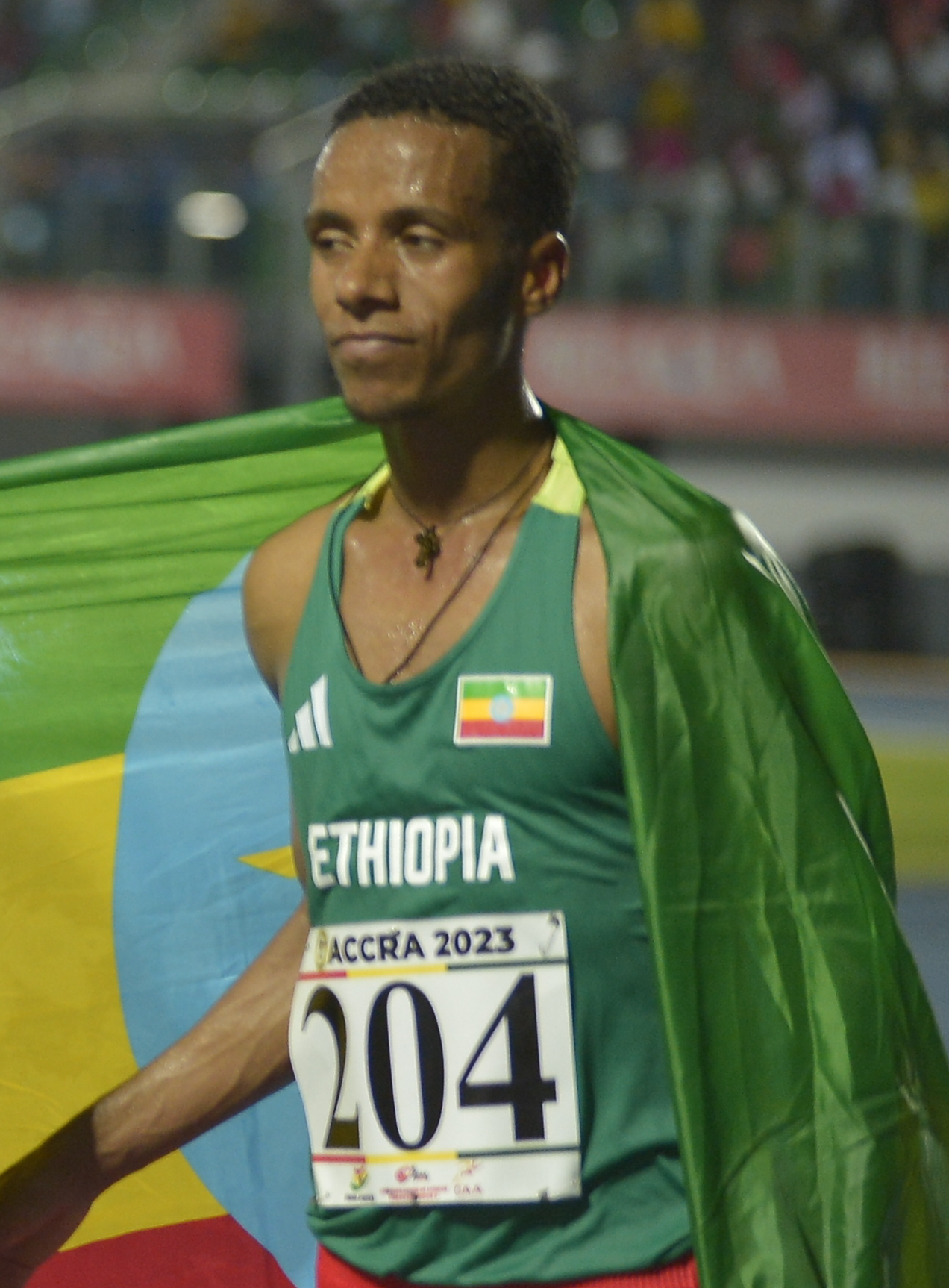
- 2023 African Games

Personal information
- Full name: Nibret Melak Bogale
- Born: 9 October 1999 (age 26)

Sport
- Sport: Athletics
- Events: 5000 metres, 10000 metres

Achievements and titles
- Personal bests: Outdoor; 5000 m: 12:54.22 (Hengelo, 2021); 10,000m: 29:45.37 (Accra, 2024); Road; 10K: 27:26 (Laredo, 2019); Half Marathon: 59:06 (Lisbon, 2023)
Medal record
Men's athletics
Representing Ethiopia
African Games
Gold medal – first place	2023 Accra	10,000 m
African Championships
Gold medal – first place	2024 Douala	10,000 m
Silver medal – second place	2024 Douala	5000 m

Nibret Melak Bogale (born 9 October 1999) is an Ethiopian long-distance runner.

== Career ==
He won the Cinque Mulini in 2021, the second leg of the World Athletics Cross Country Permit series completing a double for Ethiopia with Tsehay Gemechu winning the women's race. It was Melak's second consecutive podium finish in the Cross Country Permit series, following his runner-up spot at the Campaccio in San Giorgio su Legnano the previous week. Earlier in the year he successfully defended his senior men's title at the Jan Meda International Cross Country, which doubles as the Ethiopian Championships. Two weeks prior, he had beaten two-time world champion Muktar Edris over 5000m in Addis Ababa.

In June 21 he shaved 13 seconds off his personal best in the 5000m going from 13:07.27 to 12:54.22 as he finished second in the Ethiopian Olympic trials behind Getnet Wale and ahead of Milkesa Mengesha to secure his place at the delayed 2020 Tokyo Olympics. Competing in the 5000 metres in Tokyo, he did not qualify from the heats.

Melak defended his Cinque Mulini title in January 2022. He finished sixth in the men's 5000m at the Kip Keino Classic on May 7, 2022, in a time of 13:22.85.

He won the Lisbon half marathon in March 2023. He finished seventh in the half marathon at the 2023 World Athletics Road Running Championships in Riga, Latvia in October 2023.

He won gold at the 2023 African Games over 10,000 metres. In June 2024, he won gold in the 10,000 metres at the African Championships in Douala, Cameroon.
