= Djibouti at the 2023 African Games =

- Flag of Djibouti
- IOC code: DJI
- NOC: Djibouti National Olympic and Sports Committee

in Accra, Ghana 8 March 2024 – 23 March 2024
- Medals Ranked 41st: Gold 0 Silver 0 Bronze 1 Total 1

African Games appearances (overview)
- 2011; 2015; 2019; 2023

Djibouti competed at the 2023 African Games held from 8 to 23 March 2024 in Accra, Ghana.

== Medal table ==
Medal	Name	Sport	Event	Date
Bronze	Aden-Alexandre Houssein	Judo	Men's −73kg	13 March
