= Djibouti at the 2015 African Games =

- Flag of Djibouti
- IOC code: DJI
- NOC: Comité National Olympique Djiboutien

in Brazzaville, Republic of the Congo 4 September 2015 – 19 September 2015
- Medals: Gold 0 Silver 1 Bronze 0 Total 1

African Games appearances (overview)
- 2011; 2015; 2019; 2023

Djibouti competed at the 2015 African Games held in Brazzaville, Republic of the Congo.

== Medal summary ==
=== Medal table ===
Medal	Name	Sport	Event	Date
Silver	Abdi Waiss Mouhyadin	Athletics	Men's 1500 metres	14 September

== Athletics ==
Abdi Waiss Mouhyadin won the silver medal in the men's 1500 metres event.

== Swimming ==
Several swimmers represented Djibouti at the 2015 African Games.
