= Brașov Running Festival =

Annual 10 km race in Romania since 2021

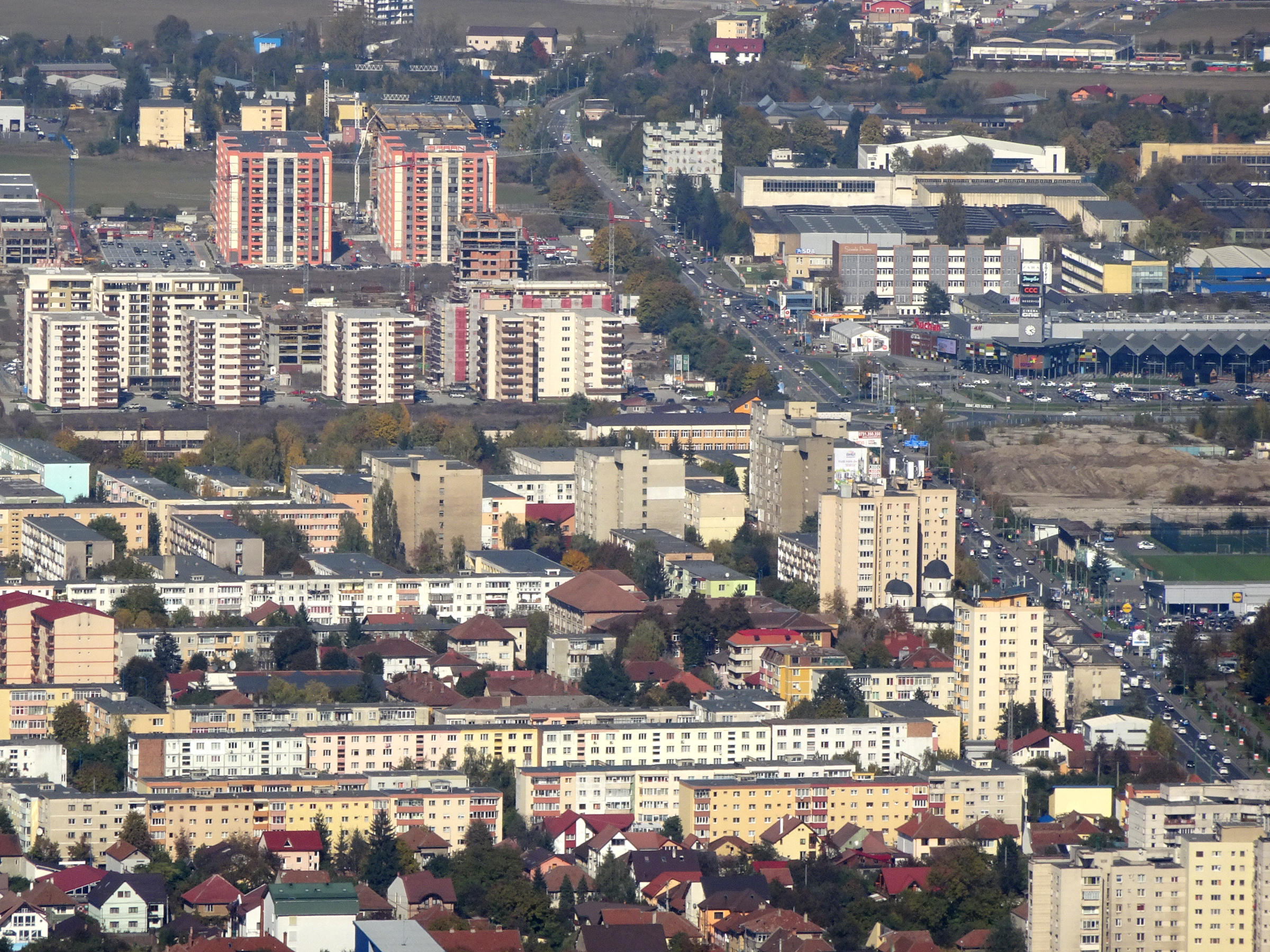
- Looking northward down 13 December Street, with the west end of the race course visible (Note: The mall in the right background is immediately to the north of the course's northwest corner, while the Lidl store in the right foreground is located about 250 m (800 ft) south of the course's southwest corner.)
- Date: September
- Location: Brașov, Romania
- Event type: Road
- Distance: 10K, 5K
- Established: 2021 (5 years ago)
- Course records: 26:51 (2022) (men); (Kenya) Nicholas Kimeli; 29:24 (2023) (women); (Kenya) Agnes Ngetich
- Website: Official website

The Brașov Running Festival is an annual road-based 10K run in Brașov, Romania. The first edition of the race took place in 2021. The race is a World Athletics Elite Label Road Race. A 5K run is also offered earlier in the day.

In both 2021 and 2022, both the male and female Romanian 10K all-comers records were broken.

== History ==
The inaugural race was held on 26 September 2021. The 10K was won by Kenyan runners Peter Mwaniki Aila and Nelly Jepchumba, with finish times of 28:39 and 32:11, respectively. (Note: The Association of International Marathons and Distance Races and World Athletics both consider Aila's finish time to be 28:40.) Both victors had set new Romanian 10K all-comers records, with Alia's performance being considered amongst the top 50 in the world at the time, and Jepchumba's amongst the top 30.

The 2022 edition of the race, held on 25 September, saw the breaking of both Romanian 10K all-comers records again. Kenyan runners Nicholas Kimeli and Sheila Chepkirui won the 10K, with finish times of 26:51 and 30:07, respectively. Kimeli's time established him as the fifth-fastest 10K runner ever, and Chepkirui missed breaking the women-only 10K world record by six seconds.

== Course ==
External image
- Course map of 10K in 2022

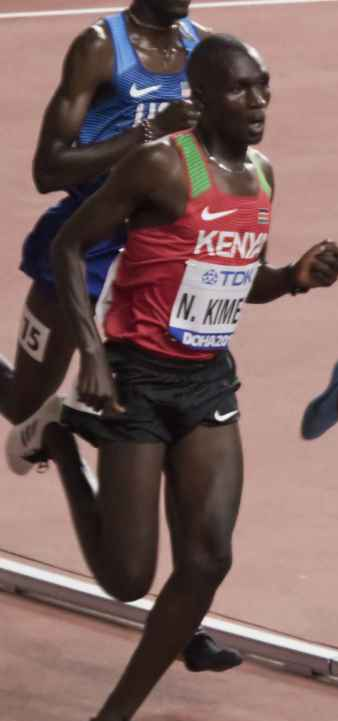
2022 winner and course record holder (as of 2022) Nicholas Kimeli (pictured here in Doha in 2019)

The races are run on a loop with a length of 3,494 m (11,463 ft). (Note: The loop used in 2021 had a length of 3,520 m (11,550 ft).) All the races use the same finish line, but their starting points vary depending on the length of the race.

The course is located north of the main train station, in the Tractorul neighbourhood of Brașov. (Note: The neighbourhood's name is a reference to Uzina Tractorul Brașov, a former tractor factory in the area.) The 10K begins on Camil Petrescu Street. Runners first head east before turning onto a minor path parallel to Camil Petrescu Street. After about 150 m (500 ft) on that path, racers make a sharp left turn onto Zaharia Stancu Street. After passing by the largest shopping mall in Transylvania, the course turns left onto 13 December Street and heads south for about 300 m (1000 ft) before turning left again, back onto Camil Petrescu Street, to complete the loop. Runners of the 10K complete just under three of these loops, finishing on Camil Petrescu Street slightly west of where they started.

== Winners ==
Key: Course record (in bold)

Ed.	Date	Male Winner	Time	Female Winner	Time	Rf.
1	2021.09.26	Peter Mwaniki Aila (KEN)	28:39	Nelly Jepchumba (KEN)	32:11	
2	2022.09.25	Nicholas Kimeli (KEN)	**26:51**	Sheila Chepkirui (KEN)	30:07	
3	2023.09.10	Weldon Langat (KEN)	27:05	Agnes Ngetich (KEN)	**29:24**	
4	2024.09.22	Daniel Kinyanjui (KEN)	27:08	Loice Chemnung (KEN)	30:13	
5	2025.10.05	Khairi Bejiga (ETH)	26:54	Medina Eisa (ETH)	30:28	

== See also ==
- Bucharest Marathon
