= 2026 African Championships in Athletics – Women's 5000 metres =

Women's 5000 metres at the 2026 African Championships in Athletics
- Venue: Legon Sports Stadium
- Location: Accra, Ghana
- Dates: 12 May
- Competitors: 12 from 9 nations
- Winning time: 15:46.62

Medalists
gold medal	Emeline Imanizabayo	Rwanda
silver medal	Samiya Hassan Nour	Djibouti
bronze medal	Ziyn Ayelegn	Ethiopia

The women's 5000 metres event at the 2026 African Championships in Athletics was held on 12 May in Accra, Ghana.

== Results ==
Rank	Athlete	Nationality	Time	Notes
1st place, gold medalist(s)	Emeline Imanizabayo	Rwanda	15:46.62	
2nd place, silver medalist(s)	Samiya Hassan Nour	Djibouti	15:47.05	
3rd place, bronze medalist(s)	Ziyn Ayelegn	Ethiopia	15:47.95	
4	Mercy Chepkemoi	Kenya	15:51.25	
5	Esther Chebet	Uganda	15:51.91	
6	Birtukan Molla	Ethiopia	15:52.95	
7	Sisilia Ginoka Panga	Tanzania	15:55.45	
8	Rahel Daniel	Eritrea	15:56.77	
9	Diana Engda	Eritrea	16:30.05	
10	Kefilwe Galeitsiwe	Botswana	16:51.31	
11	Ndienia Dorcas	Kenya	16:56.71	
12	Colette Ayade	Benin	16:59.71	
