= 2024 10K Valencia Ibercaja =

10K Valencia Ibercaja
- Venue: Valencia, Spain
- Date: January 14, 2024

Champions
- Men: Jacob Kiplimo (UGA) (26:48)
- Women: Agnes Jebet Ngetich (KEN) (28:46)

The 2024 10K Valencia Ibercaja was an Elite Label 10K run race held in Valencia, Spain, on January 14, 2024. There was a world record set in this 10km.

At the meeting, Agnes Ngetich ran 28:46 for the 10K run, becoming the first woman to run under 29 minutes for 10,000 metres.

== Results ==
Elite men's top 20 finishers
Place	Athlete	Nationality	Time
1st place, gold medalist(s)	Jacob Kiplimo	Uganda	26:48
2nd place, silver medalist(s)	Birhanu Balew	Bahrain	26:57
3rd place, bronze medalist(s)	Peter Mwaniki Aila	Kenya	26:59
4	Dennis Kibet Kitiyo	Kenya	27:01
5	Dominic Lobalu	Switzerland	27:13
6	Andreas Almgren	Sweden	27:20
7	Mohamed Ismail	Djibouti	27:27
8	Rogers Kibet	Uganda	27:33
9	Hillary Kipchirchir Chepkwony	Kenya	27:34
10	Dawit Seare Berhanyukun	Eritrea	27:35
11	Rodrigue Kwizera	Burkina Faso	27:37
12	Philemon Kiplimo	Kenya	27:44
13	Abdessamad Oukhelfen	Spain	27:44
14	Yves Nimubona	Rwanda	27:49
15	Ilias Fifa	Spain	27:50
16	Bravin Kipkogei Kiptoo	Kenya	27:53
17	Efrem Gidey	Ireland	27:56
18	Boniface Kibiwott	Kenya	27:58
19	Geofry Toroitich Kipchumba	Kenya	28:00
20	Santiago Catrofe	Uruguay	28:04

Elite women's top 20 finishers
Place	Athlete	Nationality	Time
1st place, gold medalist(s)	Agnes Jebet Ngetich	Kenya	28:46 WR
2nd place, silver medalist(s)	Emmaculate Anyango	Kenya	28:57
3rd place, bronze medalist(s)	Lilian Kasait Rengeruk	Kenya	29:32
4	Janeth Chepngetich	Kenya	29:55
5	Joy Cheptoyek	Uganda	30:03
6	Loice Chemnung	Kenya	30:08
7	Cinthia Chepngeno	Kenya	30:08
8	Irine Cheptai	Kenya	30:17
9	Fotyen Tesfay Haiylu	Ethiopia	30:20
10	Sarah Chelangat	Uganda	30:26
11	Nelvin Jepkemboi	Kenya	30:41
12	Jessica Warner-Judd	Great Britain	30:41
13	Francine Niyomukunzi	Burkina Faso	30:42
14	Beatrice Chepkoech	Kenya	30:56
15	Viola Chepngeno	Kenya	31:08
16	Faith Chepkoech	Kenya	31:15
17	Yalemget Yaregal	Ethiopia	31:19
18	Megan Keith	Great Britain	31:22
19	Aberash Shilima Kebeda	Ethiopia	31:36
20	Belinda Chemutai	Uganda	31:43

== Live Broadcast ==
- Retransmisión 10K Valencia Ibercaja 2024
- Nuevo Récord del mundo en los 10km mujeres - Agnes Ngetich 28:46
