= 2024 African Championships in Athletics – Men's 5000 metres =

Men's 5000 metres at the 2024 African Championships in Athletics
- Venue: Japoma Stadium
- Location: Douala, Cameroon
- Dates: 26 June
- Competitors: 22 from 14 nations
- Winning time: 13:38.38

Medalists
gold medal	Mohamed Ismail Ibrahim	Djibouti
silver medal	Nibret Melak	Ethiopia
bronze medal	Abdi Waiss Mouhyadin	Djibouti

The men's 5000 metres event at the 2024 African Championships in Athletics was held on 26 June in Douala, Cameroon.

== Records ==
Records before the 2024 African Athletics Championships
Record	Athlete (nation)	Time (s)	Location	Date
World record	Joshua Cheptegei (UGA)	12:35.36	Fontvieille, Monaco	14 August 2020
African record	Joshua Cheptegei (UGA)	12:35.36	Fontvieille, Monaco	14 August 2020
Championship record	Simon Chemoiywo (KEN)	13:09.68	Durban, South Africa	27 June 1993
World leading	Hagos Gebrhiwet (ETH)	12:36.73	Oslo, Norway	30 May 2024
African leading	Hagos Gebrhiwet (ETH)	12:36.73	Oslo, Norway	30 May 2024

== Results ==
Rank	Athlete	Nationality	Time	Notes
1st place, gold medalist(s)	Mohamed Ismail Ibrahim	Djibouti	13:38.38	
2nd place, silver medalist(s)	Nibret Melak	Ethiopia	13:42.95	
3rd place, bronze medalist(s)	Abdi Waiss Mouhyadin	Djibouti	13:43.20	
4	Louqman Ismail Sougueh	Djibouti	13:47.44	
5	Onessime Rondouba	Chad	13:47.44	
6	Mezgebu Sime	Ethiopia	13:48.29	
7	Hailemariyam Amare	Ethiopia	13:48.66	
8	Said Ameri	Algeria	13:52.62	
9	Levy Kibet	Kenya	13:53.74	
10	Elie Sindayikengera	Burundi	13:55.06	
11	Francis Abong	Kenya	13:55.67	
12	Jerry Motsau	South Africa	14:03.33	
13	Mustapha Akkaoui	Morocco	14:04.07	
14	Collins Kiprop	Kenya	14:04.09	
15	Natnael Teclensebet	Eritrea	14:08.49	
16	Elton Hoeseb	Namibia	14:08.67	
17	Artur Fortes Silva	Cape Verde	14:15.21	
18	Sali Abba	Cameroon	14:49.58	
19	Antonio Teko	Angola	14:55.62	
	Bienvenue Zepou	Chad	DNF	
	Yainam Andre	Cameroon	DNF	
	Mohamed Ali Hassan	Somalia	DNF	
	Abubakarr Conteh	Sierra Leone	DNS	

== See also ==
- Athletics at the 2023 African Games – Men's 5000 metres
