= Sirikwa Cross Country Classic =

Cross country running race in Kenya

- Date: February
- Location: Eldoret, Kenya
- Event type: Cross country
- Distance: 10 km
- Established: 2022
- Website: Official website

The Sirikwa Cross Country Classic is an annual cross country running race held in Eldoret, Kenya. It is a Gold Standard Meeting in the World Athletics Cross Country Tour, attracting large crowds and a world-class, mainly Kenyan, field. The first edition was held in 2022 and was named the Agnes Tirop Memorial Cross Country. In 2023, it assumed the current name - referencing an Iron Age tribe from the region. It is held in Lobo Village, on land owned by three-time Boston Marathon winner, Ibrahim Hussein.

== Past Senior Race Winners ==
Edition	Year	Men's winner	Time (m:s)	Women's winner	Time (m:s)
1st	2022	Samuel Chebolei (KEN)	29:46	Joyce Chepkemoi (KEN)	34:02
2nd	2023	Charles Lokir (KEN)	30:14	Faith Kipyegon (KEN)	33:50
3rd	2024	Daniel Ebenyo (KEN)	29:16	Emmaculate Anyango (KEN)	32:55
4th	2025	Daniel Ebenyo (KEN)	29:57	Agnes Ngetich (KEN)	32:42
5th	2026	John Korir (KEN)	29:44	Agnes Ngetich (KEN)	32:28
