= Gemechu Dida =

Ethiopian long-distance runner (born 1999)

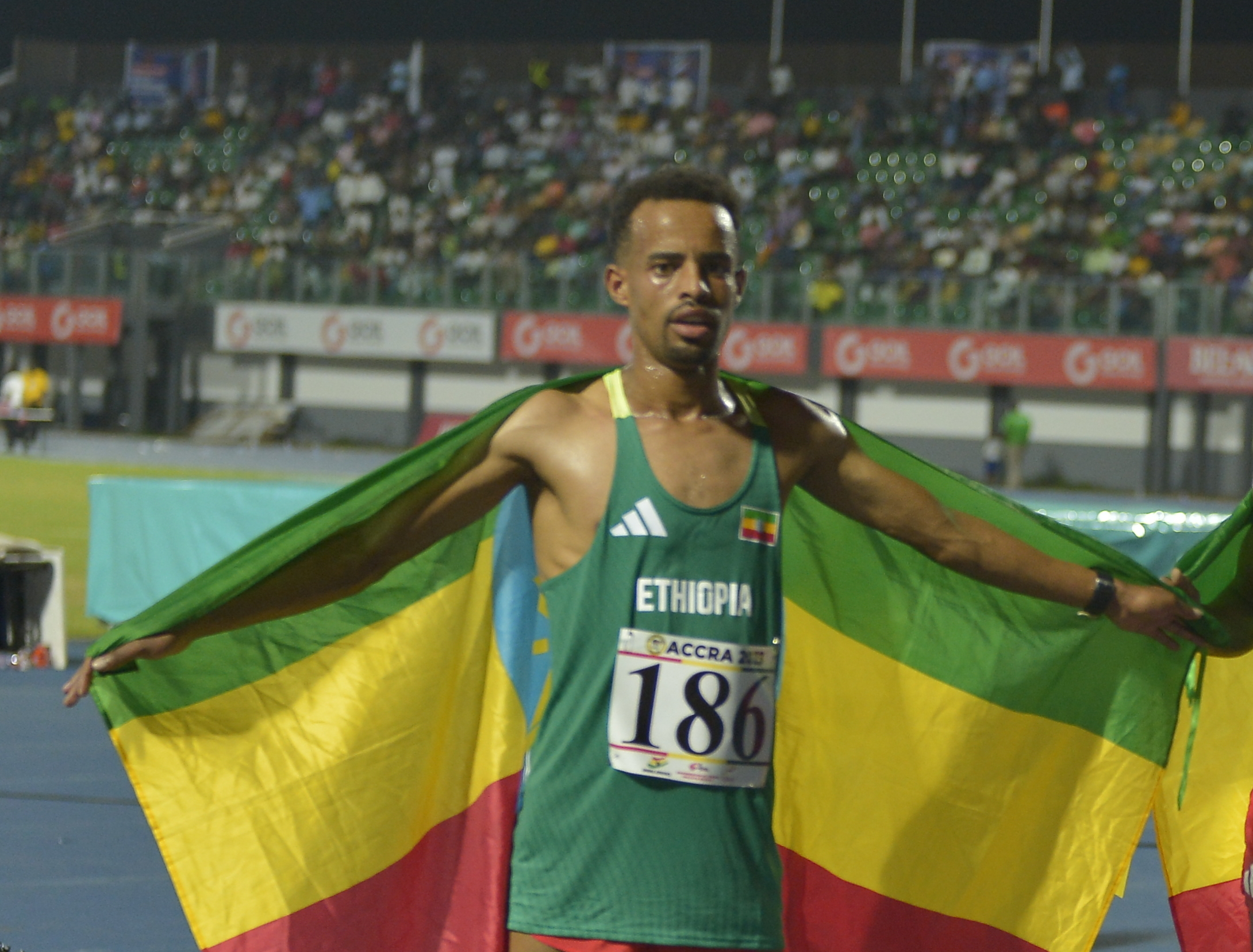
- 2023 African Games

Personal information
- Full name: Gemechu Dida Diriba
- Nationality: Ethiopia
- Born: 12 September 1999 (age 27)
- Height: 171 cm (5 ft 7 in)
- Weight: 54 kg (119 lb)

Sport
- Sport: Athletics
- Events: 10K run Half marathon

Achievements and titles
- National finals: 2021 Ethiopian Champs; • 5000m, 4th; 2022 Ethiopian Champs; • 10,000m, 3rd (bronze)
- Personal bests: 10K: 26:54 (2025) HM: 58:39 (2024) M: 2:03:19 (2026)
Medal record
Men's athletics
Representing Ethiopia
African Games
Silver medal – second place	2023 Accra	10,000 m
African Championships
Silver medal – second place	2024 Douala	10,000 m
World Marathon Majors
Silver medal – second place	2026 Berlin	Marathon
- Updated on 15 January 2024

Gemechu Dida Diriba (born 12 September 1999) is an Ethiopian long-distance runner specializing in road running. He was the winner of the 2022 Great Ethiopian Run, and he has also achieved wins at the Lille Half Marathon 10K and KBC Night of Athletics 5000 m.

== Career ==
Dida debuted at the 2017 Great Ethiopian Run, finishing 6th in 29:21 representing the Adidas Development Group. He ran two indoor 3000 m races in 2018, finishing 5th at the Birmingham Indoor Grand Prix and 6th at the Adidas Games in Boston with a best time of 7:42.14.

Dida achieved his first international championship experience in 2019, when he was selected to represent Ethiopia at the 2019 African Games following his 13:17.47 5000 m performance at that year's Fanny Blankers-Koen Games. In his African Games final, Dida finished 10th in 13:46.40.

After recording only two races in 2020, Dida competed in his first national final in 2021, finishing 4th over 5000 m at the Ethiopian Athletics Championships and then finishing 10th at their separate 5000 m Olympic trials two months later in Hengelo. Dida won the 2021 KBC Night of Athletics 5000 m in 13:14.39 over heavy rainfall, earning him the moniker "lord and master".

On 23 January 2022, Dida achieved the highest profile win of his career at the Great Ethiopian Run 10K road race. There was a large pack of runners in the beginning of the race, with six athletes still in the lead pack at 9,500 metres. Dida out-kicked the Dubai Marathon winner Getaneh Molla to win in a surprise victory. His winning time of 28:24 was only five seconds slower than the course record. Having moved up in distance to the 10,000 m, Dida would win the bronze medal at that year's Ethiopian Athletics Championships and would set a half marathon best of 59:21 in his debut at the Romaostia Half Marathon.

Dida finished 5th at the Ethiopian trials for the 2023 World Athletics Championships 10,000 m, held in Nerja. He would nonetheless achieve wins at the 2023 Lille Half Marathon 10K and the Urban Trail de Lille 10K, the former in a personal best of 27:12.

== Statistics ==
=== Personal Bests ===
Event	Mark	Competition	Venue	Date
10K run	26:54	Adizero: Road to Records	Herzogenaurach, Germany	26 April 2025
Half marathon	58:39	Valencia Half Marathon	Valencia, Spain	27 October 2024
Marathon	2:03:19	Berlin Marathon	Berlin, Germany	27 September 2026
