= 10K run =

Road running competition over a distance of ten kilometres

Athletics 10K run

World records
- Men: (Ethiopia) Yomif Kejelcha 26:31 (2025)
- Women: (Kenya) Agnes Ngetich 28:46 Mx (2024) (Kenya) Agnes Jebet Tirop 30:01 Wo (2021)

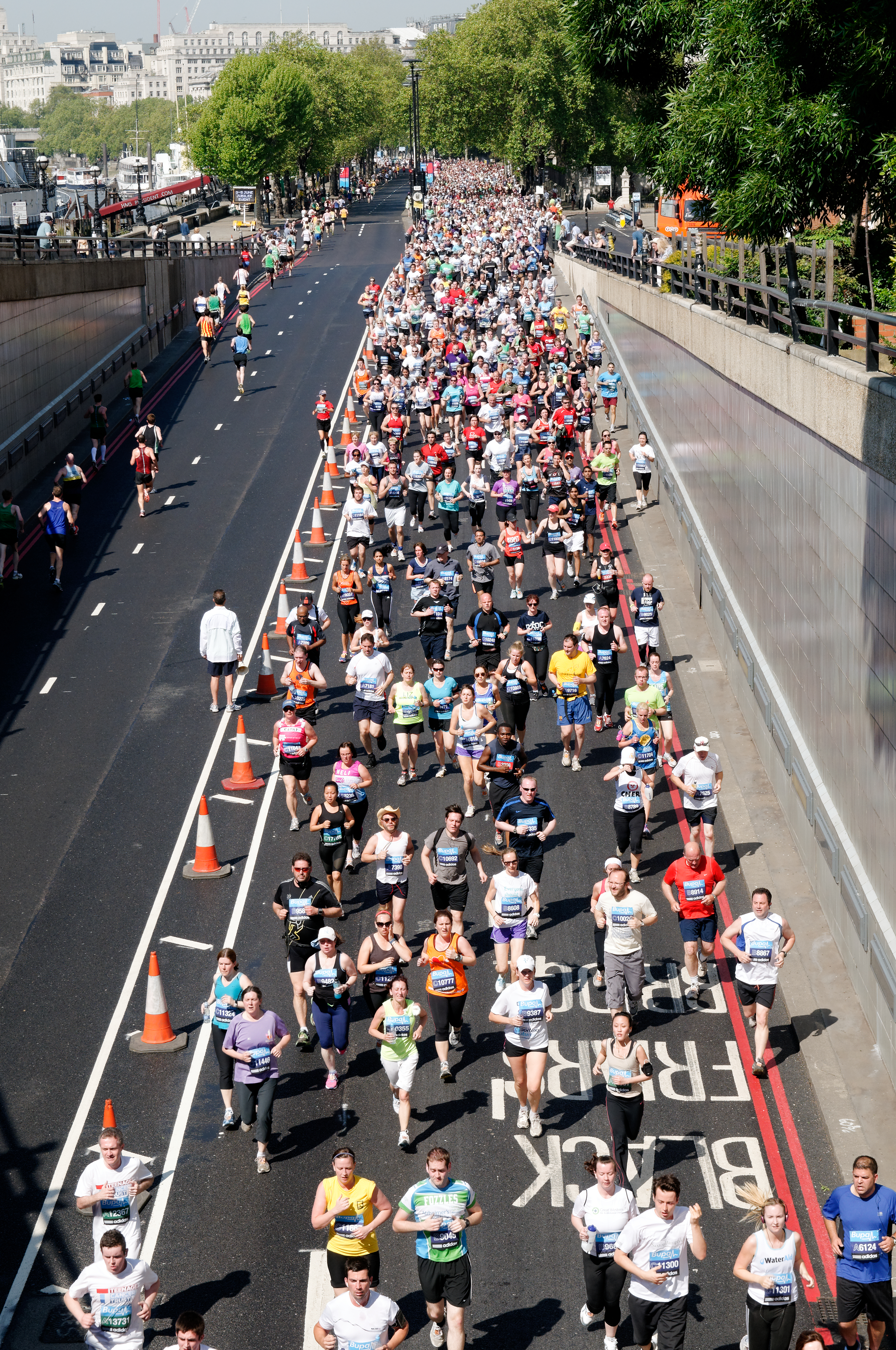
The mass public race at the 2012 London 10000 race

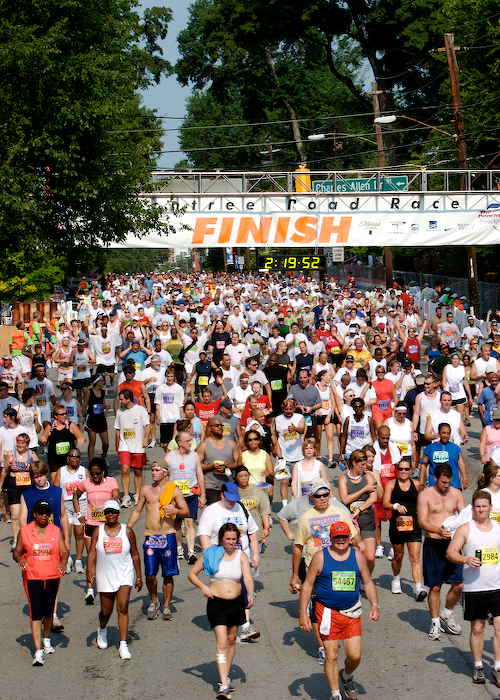
Amateur runners completing the very large 2006 Peachtree Road Race

The 10K run is a long-distance road running competition over a distance of ten kilometres (6.2 miles). Also referred to as the 10K road race, 10 km, or simply 10K, it is one of the most common types of road running event, alongside the shorter 5K and longer half marathon and marathon. It is usually distinguished from the 10,000 metres track running event by stating the distance in kilometres, rather than metres.

As one of the shortest common road distances, many 10K races attract high levels of public participation. Among the largest 10K races, the Peachtree Road Race in Atlanta, United States had over 55,000 participants in 2011, while the Vancouver Sun Run and Bolder Boulder both had close to 50,000 runners. The popularity of 10K races lies in the fact that, for most adults, the 10K distance is long enough to represent a challenge but short enough to remain accessible for an untrained runner.

Most popular 10K races are an annual fixture in a city or area and typically incorporate an element of charity running, where participants raise funds for a cause, based upon their completion of the course. Public members may participate in the races as a competition or simply for pleasure as a fun run. Some races also allow wheelchair racers to enter. Traditional New Year's Day races are often held over 10K, including the San Silvestre Vallecana in Spain.

The accessibility of the distance, and road running in general, has meant that local governments and health charities often form partnerships with races as a way of promoting physical fitness among the general public. Medical organisations, fitness groups, drinks manufacturers and sportswear companies are typical commercial sponsors of 10K events.

The 10-kilometre metric distance has been used for road running events for a large portion of the modern era of athletics – the Běchovice–Prague race is one of the longest-running events over the distance, having first been held in 1897. In Western countries using imperial measurements, the 6-mile run (9.7 km) was once more prevalent, but many long-running events (such as the Cincinnati Thanksgiving Day Race and Saltwell Road Race) have adapted their courses to match the metric distance.

== Professional 10K running ==
At the professional level, many races offer significant prize money to athletes who achieve a high finishing position in the race. At the highest level, annual prize money can total over US$100,000 at races such as the World's Best 10K, Peachtree Road Race, Apryle Showers Run - Florida's Fastest 10K, and World 10K Bangalore.

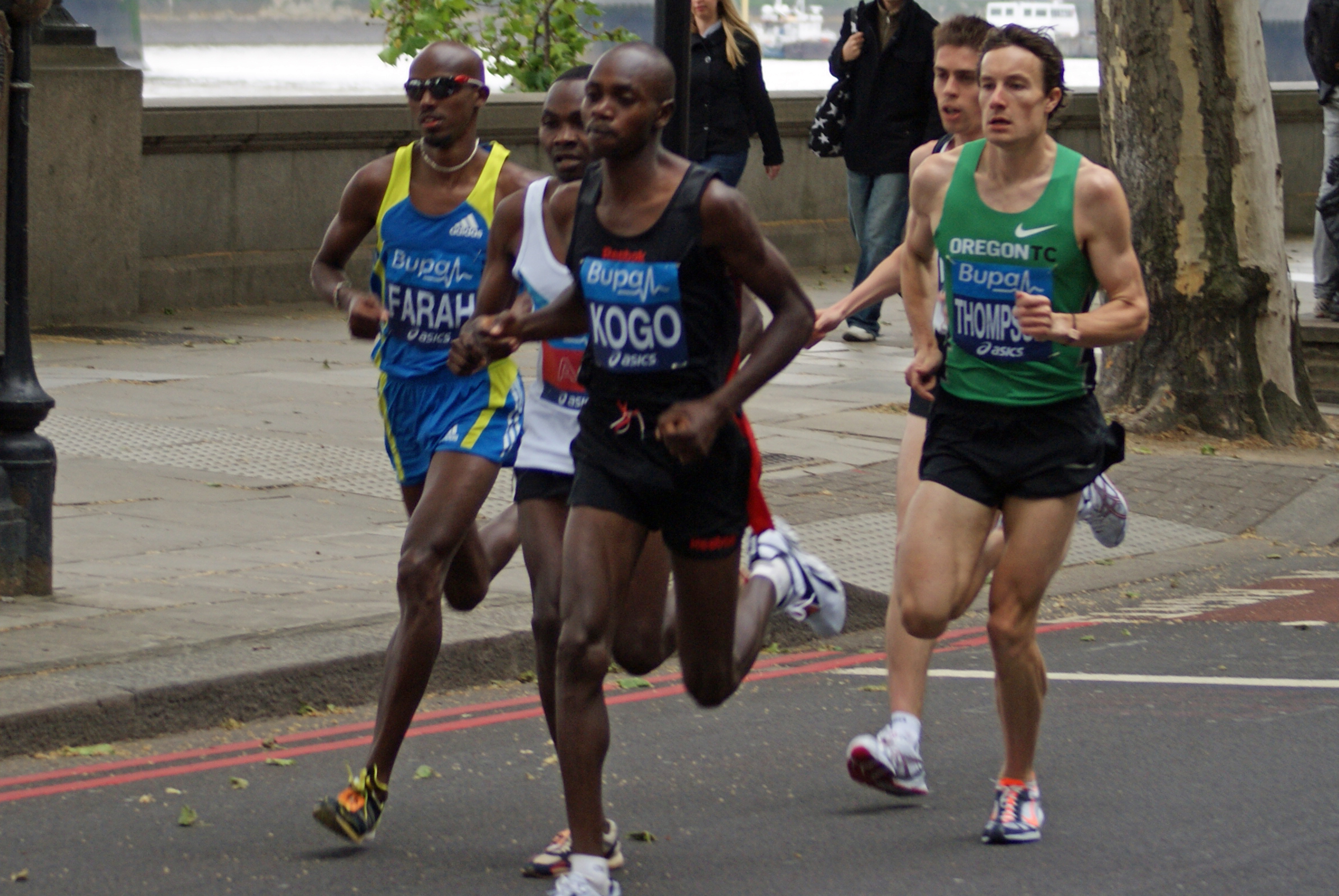
Mo Farah, Micah Kogo and Chris Thompson in the elite men's race at the London 10000 in 2010

The 10K road distance has never been featured on the event programmes of the Athletics at the Summer Olympics or the IAAF World Championships in Athletics. However, it briefly had its own individual championship for women in the form of the IAAF World Women's Road Race Championships, contested over ten kilometres in 1983 and 1984. As a result, the highest level 10K road competitions occur at individual races run by race promoters, who attract elite international level runners through prize money and appearance fees. These races are held in all parts of the world, but the highest calibre races are mainly concentrated in the United States, Canada, Europe and East Asia.

The world records for the 10K road distance are 26:31 minutes for men (Yomif Kejelcha, 2025) and 29:43 minutes for women (Joyciline Jepkosgei, 2017). Performances over ten kilometres on the roads were not recognised as world records by the International Association of Athletics Federations (IAAF) until 2003. Instead, the fastest times were referred to as "world bests". This changed in August 2003 when the IAAF Congress approved world record status for a number of specified road distances, including the 10 km.

As with other forms of professional long-distance running, East African athletes have been dominant in the 10K distance since the 1990s. As of January 2020, nine of the fastest male 10K runners are East African (five of them Kenyan), while nine of the top ten female runners are Kenyan.

== Area records ==
- Updated 5 June 2026.

Area	Men			Women		
Area	Time	Season	Athlete	Time	Season	Athlete
World	26:31	2025	Yomif Kejelcha (ETH)	28:46 Mx	2024	Agnes Jebet Ngetich (KEN)
Area records
Africa (records)	26:24	2020	Rhonex Kipruto (KEN)	28:46 Mx	2024	Agnes Jebet Ngetich (KEN)
Asia (records)	26:54	2025	Birhanu Balew (BHR)	29:38 Mx	2021	Kalkidan Gezahegne (BHR)
Europe (records)	26:43	2026	Yann Schrub (FRA)	29:51 Mx	2026	Klara Lukan (SLO)
North, Central America and Caribbean (records)	27:26	2025	Conner Mantz (USA)	30:52	2016	Shalane Flanagan (USA)
Oceania (records)	27:28	2016	Zane Robertson (NZL)	30:44	2025	Isobel Batt-Doyle (AUS)
Oceania (records)	27:28	2018	Jake Robertson (NZL)	30:44	2025	Isobel Batt-Doyle (AUS)
South America (records)	27:16	2025	Santiago Catrofe (URU)	31:44	2025	Thalia Valdivia (PER)

== All-time top 25 ==
=== Men ===
- Correct as of April 2026

Rank	Time	Athlete	Nation	Date	Race	Place	Ref.
–	26:24 (Note: Annulled due to doping offence)	Rhonex Kipruto	Kenya	12 January 2020	10K Valencia Ibercaja	Valencia	
1	26:31	Yomif Kejelcha	Ethiopia	16 February 2025	10K Facsa Castellón	Castellón de la Plana	
2	26:33	Berihu Aregawi	Ethiopia	11 March 2023	10km Villa de Laredo	Laredo	
3	26:38	Joshua Cheptegei	Uganda	1 December 2019	10K Valencia Trinidad Alfonso	Valencia	
4	26:39	Harbert Kibet	Uganda	22 February 2026	10K Facsa Castellón	Castellón de la Plana	
5	26:43	Yann Schrub	France	22 February 2026	10K Facsa Castellón	Castellón de la Plana	
6	26:44	Leonard Patrick Komon	Kenya	26 September 2010	Singelloop Utrecht	Utrecht	
7	26:45	Andreas Almgren	Sweden	11 January 2026	10K Valencia Ibercaja	Valencia	
7	26:45	Andreas Almgren	Sweden	22 February 2026	10K Facsa Castellón	Castellón de la Plana	
8	26:48	Jacob Kiplimo	Uganda	14 January 2024	10K Valencia Ibercaja	Valencia	
9	26:49	Sabastian Sawe	Kenya	29 April 2023	Adizero Road to Records	Herzogenaurach	
10	26:50	Kibiwott Kandie	Kenya	30 April 2022	Adizero Road to Records	Herzogenaurach	
11	26:51	Nicholas Kimeli	Kenya	25 September 2022	Brașov Running Festival	Brașov	
11	26:51	Khairi Bejiga	Ethiopia	4 April 2026	Urban Trail de Lille	Lille, France	
13	26:54	Dominic Lokinyomo Lobalu	Switzerland	12 January 2025	10K Valencia Ibercaja	Valencia	
13	26:54	Birhanu Balew	Bahrain	26 April 2025	Adizero: Road to Records	Herzogenaurach	
13	26:54	Gemechu Dida	Ethiopia	26 April 2025	Adizero: Road to Records	Herzogenaurach	
13	26:54	Rodrigue Kwizera	Burundi	26 April 2025	Adizero: Road to Records	Herzogenaurach	
17	26:55	Weldon Langat	Kenya	25 September 2022	Brașov Running Festival	Brașov	
17	26:55	Weldon Langat	Kenya	15 January 2023	10K Valencia Ibercaja	Valencia	
17	26:55	Isaac Kibet Ndiema	Kenya	25 September 2022	Brașov Running Festival	Brașov	
17	26:55	Vincent Kibet Langat	Kenya	12 January 2025	10K Valencia Ibercaja	Valencia	
17	26:55	Maxime Chaumeton	South Africa	5 October 2025	Brașov Running Festival	Brașov	
21	26:56	Tadese Worku	Ethiopia	12 September 2021	Road to Records	Herzogenaurach	
21	26:56 (Note: unconfirmed distance, probably short course)	Hicham Amghar	Morocco	7 April 2023	NAS Sports Tournament 10K	Dubai	
22	26:57	Felix Kipkoech	Kenya	3 October 2021	The Giants Geneva	Geneva	
22	26:57	Charles Kipkurui Langat	Kenya	15 January 2023	10K Valencia Ibercaja	Valencia	
24	26:58	Daniel Simiu Ebenyo	Kenya	9 January 2022	10K Valencia Ibercaja	Valencia	
24	26:58	Kuma Girma	Ethiopia	16 February 2025	10K Facsa Castellón	Castellón de la Plana	
24	26:58	Silas Senchura	Kenya	22 February 2026	10K Facsa Castellón	Castellón de la Plana	

==== Notes ====
Below is a list of other times equal or superior to 26:58:

- Berihu Aregawi also ran 26:33 (2023).
- Yomif Kejelcha also ran 26:37 (2024).
- Jacob Kiplimo also ran 26:48 (2024).
- Joshua Cheptegei also ran 26:49 (2022), 26:53 (2024).
- Kibiwott Kandie also ran 26:51 (2022), 26:53 (2023).
- Andreas Almgren also ran 26:53 (2025).
- Sabastian Sawe also ran 26:54 (2022).
- Nicholas Kimeli also ran 26:54 (2023), 26:56 (2025).
- Rodrigue Kwizera also ran 26:56 (2022).
- Birhanu Balew also ran 26:57 (2024).

==== Annulled marks ====
The following athletes had their performance (inside 26:58) annulled due to doping offences:

- Rhonex Kipruto also ran 26:43 (2021), 26:46 (2018), 26:58 (2022).

==== Other bests en route or on aided road course equal or superior to 26:58 ====
- Correct as of February 2022.
- + = en route to longer performance
- a = aided road course according to IAAF rule 260.28

Time	Athlete	Nation	Date	Race	Place	Ref.
26:32 a	Berihu Aregawi	Ethiopia	31 December 2024	San Silvestre Vallecana	Madrid	
26:32 a	Jacob Kiplimo	Uganda	31 December 2024	San Silvestre Vallecana	Madrid	
26:41 a	Jacob Kiplimo	Uganda	31 December 2018	San Silvestre Vallecana	Madrid	
26:54 a	Eliud Kipchoge	Kenya	31 December 2006	San Silvestre Vallecana	Madrid	
26:54 a	Zersenay Tadese	Eritrea	31 December 2006	San Silvestre Vallecana	Madrid	
26:54 a	Abadi Hadis	Ethiopia	31 December 2018	San Silvestre Vallecana	Madrid	

==== Notes ====
Below is a list of other times equal or superior to 26:58:

- Khairi Bejiga also ran 26:54 (2025).
- Jacob Kiplimo also ran 26:56+ (2022).

=== Women ===
- Correct as of April 2026.
- Mx = mixed gender race
- Wo = women only race

Rank	Time	Athlete	Nation	Date	Race	Place	Ref.
1	28:46 Mx	Agnes Ngetich	Kenya	14 January 2024	10K Valencia Ibercaja	Valencia	
2	28:57 Mx	Emmaculate Acholi	Kenya	14 January 2024	10K Valencia Ibercaja	Valencia	
3	29:14 Mx	Yalemzerf Yehualaw	Ethiopia	27 February 2022	10K Facsa Castellón	Castellón de la Plana	
4	29:25 Mx	Medina Eisa	Ethiopia	16 February 2025	10K Facsa Castellón	Castellón de la Plana	
5	29:30 Mx	Hellen Ekalale Lobun	Kenya	12 January 2025	10K Valencia Ibercaja	Valencia	
6	29:32 Mx	Lilian Rengeruk	Kenya	14 January 2024	10K Valencia Ibercaja	Valencia	
7	29:34 Mx	Girmawit Gebrzihair	Ethiopia	12 January 2025	10K Valencia Ibercaja	Valencia	
7	29:34 Mx	Caroline Makandi Gitonga	Kenya	22 February 2026	10K Facsa Castellón	Castellón de la Plana	
9	29:38 Mx	Kalkidan Gezahegne	Bahrain	3 October 2021	The Giants Geneva	Geneva	
10	29:40 Mx	Likina Amebaw	Ethiopia	16 February 2025	10K Facsa Castellón	Castellón de la Plana	
11	29:42 Mx	Fotyen Tesfay	Ethiopia	12 January 2025	10K Valencia Ibercaja	Valencia	
12	29:43 Mx	Joyciline Jepkosgei	Kenya	9 September 2017	Prague Grand Prix	Prague	
12	29:43 Mx	Asayech Ayichew	Ethiopia	12 January 2025	10K Valencia Ibercaja	Valencia	
14	29:45 Mx	Nelvin Jepkemboi	Kenya	22 February 2026	10K Facsa Castellón	Castellón de la Plana	
15	29:46 Mx	Sheila Chepkirui	Kenya	12 January 2020	10K Valencia	Valencia	
16	29:50 Mx	Rosemary Wanjiru	Kenya	12 January 2020	10K Valencia	Valencia	
16	29:50 Mx	Margaret Chelimo Kipkemboi	Kenya	3 October 2021	10K Valencia Ibercaja	Valencia	
16	29:50 Mx	Faith Chepkoech	Kenya	25 February 2024	10K Facsa Castellón	Castellón de la Plana	
16	29:50 Mx	Chaltu Dida	Ethiopia	22 February 2026	10K Facsa Castellón	Castellón de la Plana	
16	29:50 Mx	Klara Lukan	Slovenia	18 April 2026	Ruta Villa de Laredo	Laredo, Spain	
21	29:51 Mx	Norah Jeruto	Kenya	12 January 2020	10K Valencia	Valencia	
22	29:55 Mx	Janeth Chepngetich	Kenya	14 January 2024	10K Valencia Ibercaja	Valencia	
23	29:56 Mx	Diana Chepkorir	Kenya	25 February 2024	10K Facsa Castellón	Castellón de la Plana	
23	29:56 Mx	Likina Amebaw	Ethiopia	5 April 2024	Festival of Running ASICS Speed Race	Paris	
23	29:56	Christine Chesiro	Kenya	16 November 2024	Urban Trail de Lille	Lille	

==== Notes ====
Below is a list of other times equal or superior to 29:56:

- Agnes Ngetich also ran 28:58 Mx (2026), 29:24 Wo (Note: Ngetich's women's-only record was not certified after the course was found to be 25 metres too short by World Athletics.) (2023), 29:26 Wo (2023), 29:27 Wo (2025).
- Yalemzerf Yehualaw also ran 29:19 Mx (2023).
- Fotyen Tesfay also ran 29:54 Mx (2024).

==== Other bests en route or on aided road course equal or superior to 29:56 ====
- Correct as of May 2021.
- + = en route to longer performance
- a = aided road course according to IAAF rule 260.28

Time	Athlete	Nation	Date	Race	Place	Ref.
29:12+	Letesenbet Gidey	Ethiopia	17 November 2019	Zevenheuvelenloop	Nijmegen	
29:45+ Mx	Yalemzerf Yehualaw	Ethiopia	24 October 2021	Valencia Half Marathon	Valencia	
29:45+ Mx	Sheila Chepkirui	Kenya	24 October 2021	Valencia Half Marathon	Valencia	
29:54 a	Brigid Kosgei	Kenya	31 December 2018	San Silvestre Vallecana	Madrid	

===== Notes =====
Below is a list of other times equal or superior to 29:56:

- Letesenbet Gidey also ran 29:44+ (2019), 29:45+ (2021).
- Yalemzerf Yehualaw also ran 29:52+ Mx (2022).
