= London 10,000 =

Coordinates: 51°30′7″N 0°8′6″W

- Date: May
- Location: St. James's Park, London, United Kingdom
- Event type: Road
- Distance: 10 km
- Established: 2008
- Course records: 27:44 (Mo Farah, 2010); 31:06 (Mary Keitany, 2010)

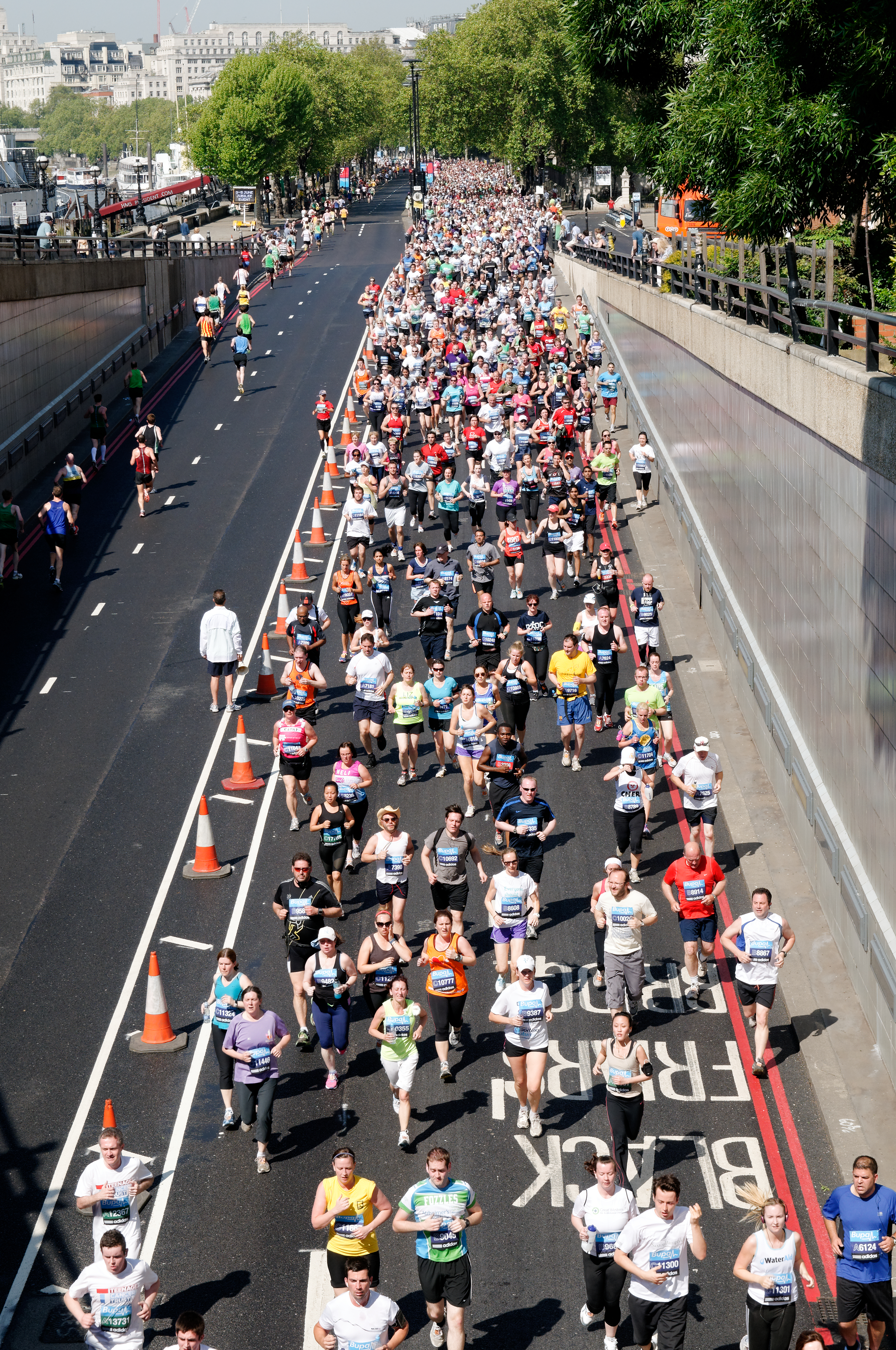
Runners crossing Blackfriars Bridge in 2012

The London 10,000 is an annual road running event over 10 kilometres (6.2 mi) which takes place in late May in London, United Kingdom. Established in 2008, the race goes through the roads of St. James's Park and finishes on the mall by Buckingham Palace. VitalityHealth took over sponsorship in 2016 from the original sponsor Bupa.

It has become one of the most popular mass participation 10k runs in the United Kingdom. In 2008, over 12,500 runners took part, with 8372 recorded finishers for the 2009 event. It is managed by the same organisers as the London Marathon.

Mo Farah is a seven-time winner of the men's race and his course record of 27:44 minutes in 2010 was ratified as the British record for the 10K road distance. The women's record of 31:06 minutes was also set in 2010, by Kenya's Mary Keitany.

== Elite race winners ==
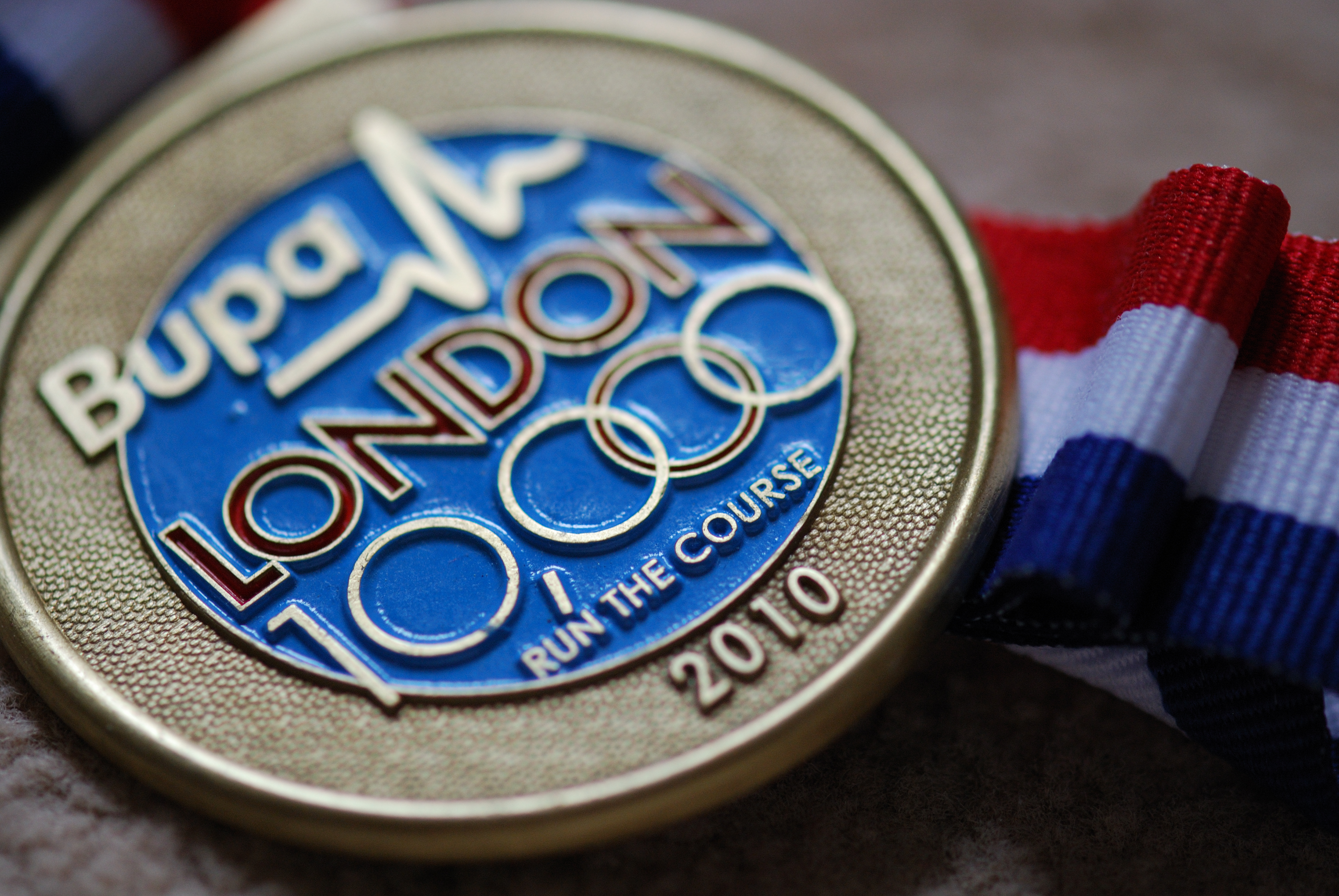
2010 race medal

Key: Course record

Edition	Year	Men's winner	Time (h:m:s)	Women's winner	Time (h:m:s)
1st	2008	Micah Kogo (KEN)	28:08	Irina Mikitenko (GER)	32:02
2nd	2009	Mo Farah (GBR)	27:50	Kim Smith (NZL)	31:38
3rd	2010	Mo Farah (GBR)	27:44	Mary Keitany (KEN)	31:06
4th	2011	Mo Farah (GBR)	29:15	Jo Pavey (GBR)	32:22
5th	2012	Mo Farah (GBR)	29:21	Mara Yamauchi (GBR)	32:53
6th	2013	Mo Farah (GBR)	29:13	Katrina Wootton (GBR)	32:37
7th	2014	Andy Vernon (GBR)	29:33	Gemma Steel (GBR)	32:53
8th	2015	Andy Vernon (GBR)	28:38	Jo Pavey (GBR)	32:56
9th	2016	Andrew Butchart (GBR)	28:28	Lily Partridge (GBR)	33:03
10th	2017	Andrew Butchart (GBR)	29:18	Jo Pavey (GBR)	32:57
11th	2018	Mo Farah (GBR)	29:44	Stephanie Twell (GBR)	32:34
12th	2019	Mo Farah (GBR)	28:14	Stephanie Twell (GBR)	31:55
