= Micah Kogo =

Kenyan long-distance runner (born 1986)

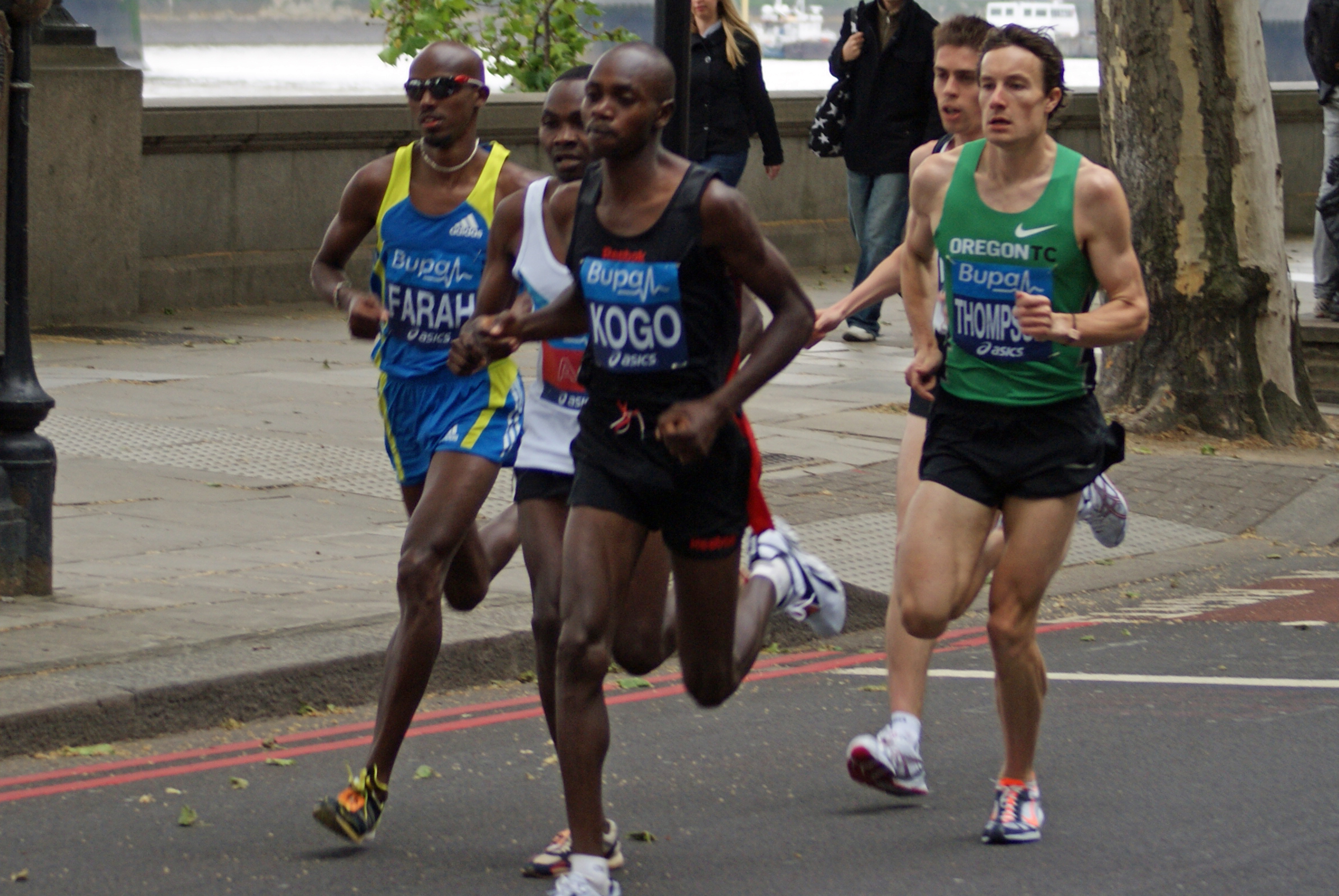

Personal information
- Nationality: Kenyan
- Born: 3 June 1986 (age 40) Burnt Forest, Uasin Gishu District, Kenya

Sport
- Sport: Running
- Events: 5000 metres 10,000 metres 10 km road race
Medal record
Representing Kenya
Men's athletics
Olympic Games
Bronze medal – third place	2008 Beijing	10000 m

Micah Kemboi Kogo (born 3 June 1986 in Burnt Forest, Uasin Gishu District) is a Kenyan long-distance runner, who specialises in the 10,000 metres. He is the former world record holder in the 10 kilometres road race event with a time of 27:01. He made his first Olympic appearance in 2008, taking the 10,000 m bronze medal in Beijing. His 10000m best of 26.35 is 6th fastest of all time.

== Early life ==
Born into a family of subsistence farmers, Kogo first began running when he was a young child as this was the only way he could attend primary school. He began competing at district level in Kewet, running in the 5000 and 10,000 metres events. When he began high school, he continued to race at these distances, reaching both finals at the national secondary school championships. At this point, coach Sammy Rono noticed Kogo's athletic ability and offered to train him. Kogo accepted and, following his graduation from high school, he competed in the Discovery meet in Eldoret, Kenya. They spent the majority of 2004 in training, preparing Kogo for forthcoming athletics seasons.

== International career ==
=== Beginnings in Europe ===
He made his first impression on the international circuit in 2005 competing at a number of road races: he won the L'Escalade 8 km run, the Corrida de Houilles 10 km run and the Auckland Castle 10 km event. He also took second place at La Provence 10 km and at a meeting in Dunkirk. On top of this he was successful in the national competitions, winning the Chepkoilel cross country events.

He remained in winning form in the 2006 season, defending his title at the L'Escalade and Dunkirk cross country running events. On 25 August 2006 at the Memorial Van Damme meeting he ran a personal best of 26:35.63 minutes, reaching the top ten fastest times in the event. The next month he finished sixth in the 5000 metres race at the 2006 IAAF World Athletics Final. On 19 November 2006 he won the Zevenheuvelenloop in and around Nijmegen. Kogo finished in a time of 42:42 beating Abebe Dinkesa by a second, while Bernard Kipyego and Zersenay Tadese both finished two seconds behind Kogo.

On 1 April 2007 he won the 10 km road race at the Parelloop in Brunssum (Netherlands) in 27:07. It was the third fastest time over 10 km ever. On 20 May 2007 he won the BUPA Great Manchester Run in a time of 27:21.

=== Olympic medal and world record ===
On 4 May 2008, he won the annual Lilac Bloomsday Run in Spokane, Washington, a 12 kilometres race, with a time of 33:51— a new course record. Greater success laid on the track: he was selected to represent Kenya internationally for the first time and ran in the 10,000 m at the 2008 Beijing Olympics. Kogo was their best performer in the event, pipping Moses Masai to the Olympic bronze medal and winning his first major medal. He won another medal on the track at the 2008 IAAF World Athletics Final the following month, taking the 5000 m bronze.

In March 2009, Kogo broke Haile Gebrselassie's world record at 10 km by clocking 27:01 at the Parelloop race in the Netherlands. He was quoted as saying, "After running 27:07 in 2007 I always had it in my mind to come back and try for the world record on this course." He followed this up with a win at the Great Edinburgh Run, running a close race with defending champion Bernard Kipyego before taking the gold medal in 28:13. He competed at the 2009 World Championships, finishing seventh in the 10,000 metres race. He closed his track season with a 5000 m silver medal behind Imane Merga at the 2009 IAAF World Athletics Final.

At the start of 2010 he won the Laredo 10 km race, but was second at the Paralloop, losing his title to Martin Mathathi. He competed at the London 10,000 in May but again took the runner-up position, this time to British runner Mo Farah. Kogo's 10K world record was beaten by Leonard Komon in September 2010 and the Grand 10 Berlin race two weeks later presented Kogo with an opportunity to go head-to-head with him. The victory went to Komon and Kogo had to content himself with fourth place in 28:24 (over a minute behind his rival).

Kogo took a third career victory at the Parelloop in April 2011. Central Park's UAE Healthy Kidney 10K saw another match against Komon, but Kogo was second place behind him in the race. He topped the podium at the Beach to Beacon 10K in August, although he missed the course record after making a fast start. A personal best of 60:03 minutes for the half marathon came at the Great North Run, though he narrowly finished outside the top three.

He tried to make the Kenyan Olympic team for a second time in 2012, but managed only ninth in the trial race at the Prefontaine Classic. The highlights of his season came at the Peachtree Road Race (where he was runner-up in 27:39 minutes), then two strong performances on the British circuit, where he won the Great Birmingham Run and came runner-up by a second to Wilson Kipsang at the Great North Run, recording a personal best of 59:07 minutes.

In 2013, Kogo made his marathon debut, finishing second at the Boston Marathon in 2:10:27. He improved his time to 2:06:56 when finishing fourth in Chicago.

Kogo came in first place in the 2013 Beach to Beacon 10K in Cape Elizabeth, Maine. His time was 28 minutes, 3.2 seconds. This is his second win at the Beach to Beacon 10K. He also won the Falmouth Road Race in 2013.

Kogo is based at the PACE Sports Management training camp in Kaptagat.

== Achievements ==
Year	Competition	Venue	Position	Event	Notes
Representing Kenya
2006	World Athletics Final	Stuttgart, Germany	3rd	5000 m	
2007	World Athletics Final	Stuttgart, Germany	2nd	5000 m	
2008	Olympic Games	Beijing, China	3rd	10000 m	
2008	World Athletics Final	Stuttgart, Germany	3rd	5000 m	
2009	World Championships	Berlin, Germany	7th	10000 m	
2009	World Athletics Final	Thessaloniki, Greece	2nd	5000 m	

== Personal bests ==
Event	Time	Date	Location
3000 metres	7:38.67	7 August 2007	Stockholm, Sweden
Two miles	8:20.88	23 August 2005	Linz, Austria
5000 metres	13:00.77	25 July 2006	Stockholm, Sweden
10000 metres	26:35.63	25 August 2006	Brussels, Belgium
10K (road race)	27:01	29 March 2009	Brunssum, Netherlands
12K (road race)	33:51	4 May 2008	Spokane, United States
15K (road race)	42:42	19 November 2006	Nijmegen, Netherlands
Half Marathon	59:33	22 March 2015	Lisbon, Portugal
Marathon	2:06:56	13 October 2013	Chicago, United States

- All information taken from IAAF profile.

Records
Preceded by (Ethiopia) Haile Gebrselassie	Men's 10 kilometres world record holder 29 March 2009 – 26 September 2010	Succeeded by Leonard Komon
