= Zourah Ali =

Djiboutian runner

Personal information
- Born: November 23, 1994 (age 31) Ali Sabieh, Djibouti
- Height: 5'3.5"
- Weight: 117 lb (53 kg)

Sport
- Country: Djibouti
- Sport: Athletics
- Event: 400m

Zourah Ali also known as Souhra Ali Mohamed (born 23 November 1994) is a Djiboutian runner. She competed in the 2012 and 2020 Summer Olympics.

== Career ==
She competed at the 2012 Summer Olympics in the 400m event, which she completed in 1:05.37 minutes. She did not place high enough in her heat to be qualified to the semifinals as she finished in 44th place and with the second slowest time in that race. After the Olympics, Zourah was sponsored by the Republican Guard, which is the branch of military that guards the president. Zourah was the only female athlete for the Republican Guard for a period of time, but with the addition of athletes such as Kadra Mohamed Dembil, they expanded their female team. She was the flag bearer for Djibouti at the opening ceremony.

She participated at the 2011 All-Africa Games in Maputo, and 2011 Pan Arab Games in Doha, 2017 Pan Arab Games in Baku, 2019 Arab Championships in Cairo, and 2019 African Games in Rabat.

She again competed at the 2020 Summer Olympics, in the 1500 metres event.

Olympic Games
Preceded by Salah Houssein Ahmed	Flagbearer for Djibouti; London 2012	Succeeded by Abdi Waiss Mouhyadin
