= Khairi Bejiga =

Ethiopian athlete (born 2006)

Personal information
- Born: 27 April 2006 (age 20)

Sport
- Sport: Athletics
- Event: Long-distance running

Achievements and titles
- Personal bests: 5000m: 13:03.27 (Lausanne, 2026); Road; 5 km: 13:14 (Al Khobar, 2025); 10 km: 26:52 (Valencia, 2026)

Khairi Bejiga (born 27 April 2006) is an Ethiopian long-distance runner. He set the Ethiopian best under-20 time in the 10K run whilst competing in 2025.

== Biography ==
Bejiga finished eleventh over 5000 metres on 16 May at the 2025 Doha Diamond League. Competing at the Meeting Nikaia, a World Athletics Continental Tour Bronze meeting on 31 May 2025, he finished runner-up behind Eritrea's Saymon Amanuel, but ahead of Niels Laros, running 13:06.95. in Nice, France. The following month, he lowered his personal best for the distance at the Paavo Nurmi Games in Turku to 13:06.53.

On his debut 10 km road race, he won the tRUNsylvania 10K – a World Athletics Elite Label road race in Brasov, Romania in October 2025. His winning time of 26:54 equalled the fastest ever debut over the distance, equalling the time of Sabastian Sawe from 2022, and placed second fastest on the all-time U20 list. He was also only 3 seconds outside the course record held by Nicholas Kimeli.

On 11 January 2026, he placed second over 10 km in Valencia behind Andreas Almgren, running a personal best 26:52. In May, he ran a personal best 13:06.45 for the 5000 metres as he placed sixth overall at the 2026 Xiamen Diamond League. Competing in the Diamond League at the 2026 Athletissima in Lausanne, Switzerland on 21 August 2026, he placed ninth over 5000 metres in a personal best 13:03.27.
