= Emmaculate Anyango =

Kenyan runner (born 2000)

Personal information
- Full name: Emmaculate Anyango Achol
- Nationality: Kenyan
- Born: April 2, 2000 (age 26)

Sport
- Sport: athletics
- Events: Long distance running, Cross Country Running

Achievements and titles
- Personal bests: 1500m: 4:24.91 (Nairobi, 2023); 3000m: 9:29.84 (Nairobi, 2019); 5000m: 15:22.80 (Nerja, 2023); 10000m: 30:06.43 (Eugene, 2024); 10km (road): 28.57 (Valencia, 2024)
Medal record
Women's Athletics
Representing Kenya
World Cross Country Championships
Gold medal – first place	2024 Belgrade	Senior team
African U20 Championships
Silver medal – second place	2019 Abidjan	3000 m

Emmaculate Anyango Achol (born 2 April 2000) is a Kenyan cross country runner. She is currently serving a six-year ban (from September 2024) for a doping violation.

== Early life ==
From Kericho County, she has a brother and four sisters. She is a member of the Luo people. She attended school in the Rift Valley but later moved to Iten to train in athletics and began to be coached by Ken Rotich.

== Career ==
She was U20 African Championships 3000m silver medallist in 2019 in Abidjan.

In January 2023, she won the Discovery Kenya Cross Country Championship. She won the 10,000 metres at the Meeting Gala Fernanda Ribeiro in May 2023, in Portugal.

She ran 28.57 at the 2024 10K Valencia Ibercaja in January 2024, becoming the second woman ever to run a 10 km event in less than 29 minutes. Her compatriot Agnes Jebet Ngetich became the first to do so in the same race, as she broke women's 10 km world record. In February 2024, she won the Sirikwa Cross Country Classic in Eldoret.

She was runner-up to Agnes Ngetich at the Kenyan cross country trials on 2 March 2024 and was selected for the 2024 World Cross Country Championships in Serbia, where she finished fourth, winning team gold with Kenya.

In 2024, she had second-place finishes at the BAA 5 km in Boston and the TCS World 10 km Road Race in Bengaluru, India. She placed sixth in the Kenyan Olympic 10,000m trials at the Prefontaine Classic, where she ran a personal best of 30:06.43.

== Doping violation ==
Anyango is currently serving a six-year competition band due to end in September 2030 in relation to an anti-doping rule violation for the presence and use of testosterone and EPO. The increase of the ban from the standard four years to six years was due to "aggravating circumstances" relating to multiple failed tests. All of her results from 3 February 2024 were disqualified.
