= Harbert Kibet =

Ugandan athlete

Personal information
- Nationality: Ugandan
- Born: 17 June 2005 (age 21)

Sport
- Sport: Athletics
- Events: Long-distance running, Cross Country running

Achievements and titles
- Personal bests: 3000m: 7:53.05 (Nembro, 2025); 5000 m: 13:11.87 (Oordegem 2025); 5km (Road): 13:00 (Tokyo, 2025); 10km (Road): 26:39 (Castellon, 2026)

Harbert Kibet (born 17 June 2005) is an Ugandan long-distance runner. He competed at the 2025 World Athletics Championships.

== Biography ==
Kibet competed for Uganda at the 2024 World Athletics U20 Championships in the men's 3000 metres, placing fifth overall in Lima, Peru, in August 2024.

Kibet trains in a group with Moses Ndiema Kipsiro in Bukwo. He qualified for the 2024 World Athletics Cross Country Championships in Belgrade, but was unable to travel due to VISA problems. He finished third at the Ugandan cross country championships in February 2025. He won on the road over 5 km at the ASICS Tokyo : Speed : Race in Tokyo, Japan, in May 2025, running a personal best 13:00 to finish ahead of Mohamed Ismail Ibrahim of Djibouti.

Kibet was selected for the 5000 metres at the 2025 World Athletics Championships in Tokyo, Japan, but did not qualify for the final.

Kibet moved into the top five on the world all-time list at the 10K Facsa Castellón, a World Athletics Label road race, on 22 February 2026, making his 10 km debut. Kibet won the race in a world-leading 26:39, the fifth-fastest 10 km run in history, and just one second slower than his compatriot Joshua Cheptegei.

In September 2026, the Athletics Integrity Unit announced the suspension of Kibet following an adverse finding in a doping control test which showed the presence of Triamcinolone acetonide and Exogenous Steroids.
