= Mohamed Ismail Ibrahim =

Djiboutian runner (born 1997)

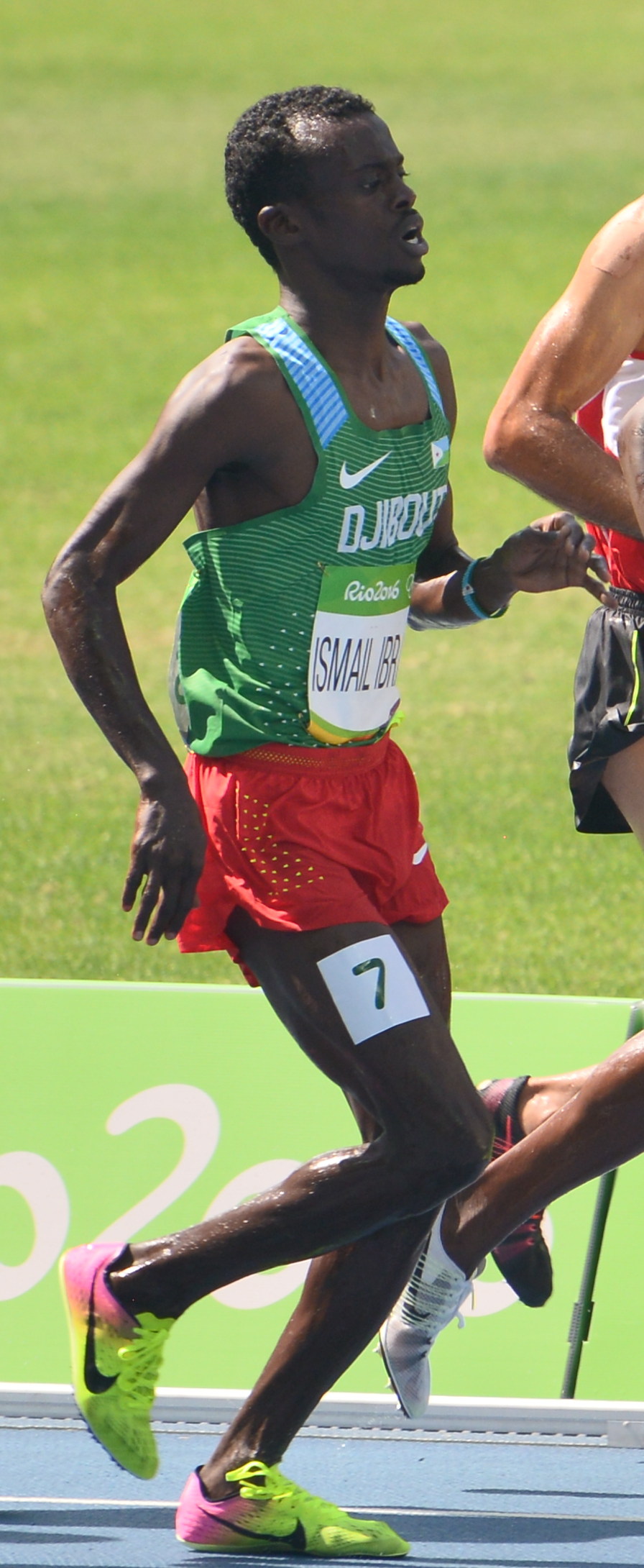
- Ibrahim at the 2016 Olympics

Personal information
- Born: 1 January 1997 (age 29)
- Height: 170 cm (5 ft 7 in)
- Weight: 63 kg (139 lb)

Sport
- Sport: Athletics
- Event: Steeplechase

Achievements and titles
- Personal best: 8:23.77 (2016)
Medal record
Representing Djibouti
African Championships
Gold medal – first place	2024 Douala	5000 m
Islamic Solidarity Games
Silver medal – second place	2017 Baku	3000 m steeplechase
Silver medal – second place	2021 Konya	3000 m steeplechase
Silver medal – second place	2025 Riyadh	3000 m steeplechase
Bronze medal – third place	2017 Baku	5000 m
Jeux de la Francophonie
Gold medal – first place	2023 Kinshasa	5000 m
Gold medal – first place	2023 Kinshasa	3000 m steeplechase
Arab Championships
Gold medal – first place	2017 Radès	1500 m
Gold medal – first place	2017 Radès	3000 m steeplechase
Gold medal – first place	2023 Marrakesh	5000 m
Summer Youth Olympics
Bronze medal – third place	2014 Nanjing	1500m
- Updated on 17 November 2025

Mohamed Ismail Ibrahim (born 1 January 1997) is a Djiboutian runner. At the 2016 Summer Olympics he competed in the 3000 m steeplechase, but failed to reach the final.

== Personal bests ==
- 1500 metres – 3:36.98 (Kortrijk 2017)
  - Indoor – 3:44.26i (Madrid 2017)
- 3000 metres – 7:36.29 (Stockholm 2024)
  - Indoor – 7:50.05 (Glasgow 2024)
- 5000 metres – 12:56.43 (Stockholm 2024) NR
- 10,000 metres – 27:22.38 (Stockholm 2024) NR
- 3000 metres steeplechase – 8:22.17 (Nice 2021) NR
- 5K (road) – 13:10 (Tokyo 2025)
- 10K (road) – 27:27 (Valencia 2024) NR
- Half Marathon (road) – 59:54 (Lisboa 2025)

Olympic Games
Preceded by Aden-Alexandre Houssein	Flag bearer for Djibouti; Paris 2024 with Samiyah Hassan Nour	Succeeded by Incumbent
