= Charity runner =

Person running in a road race

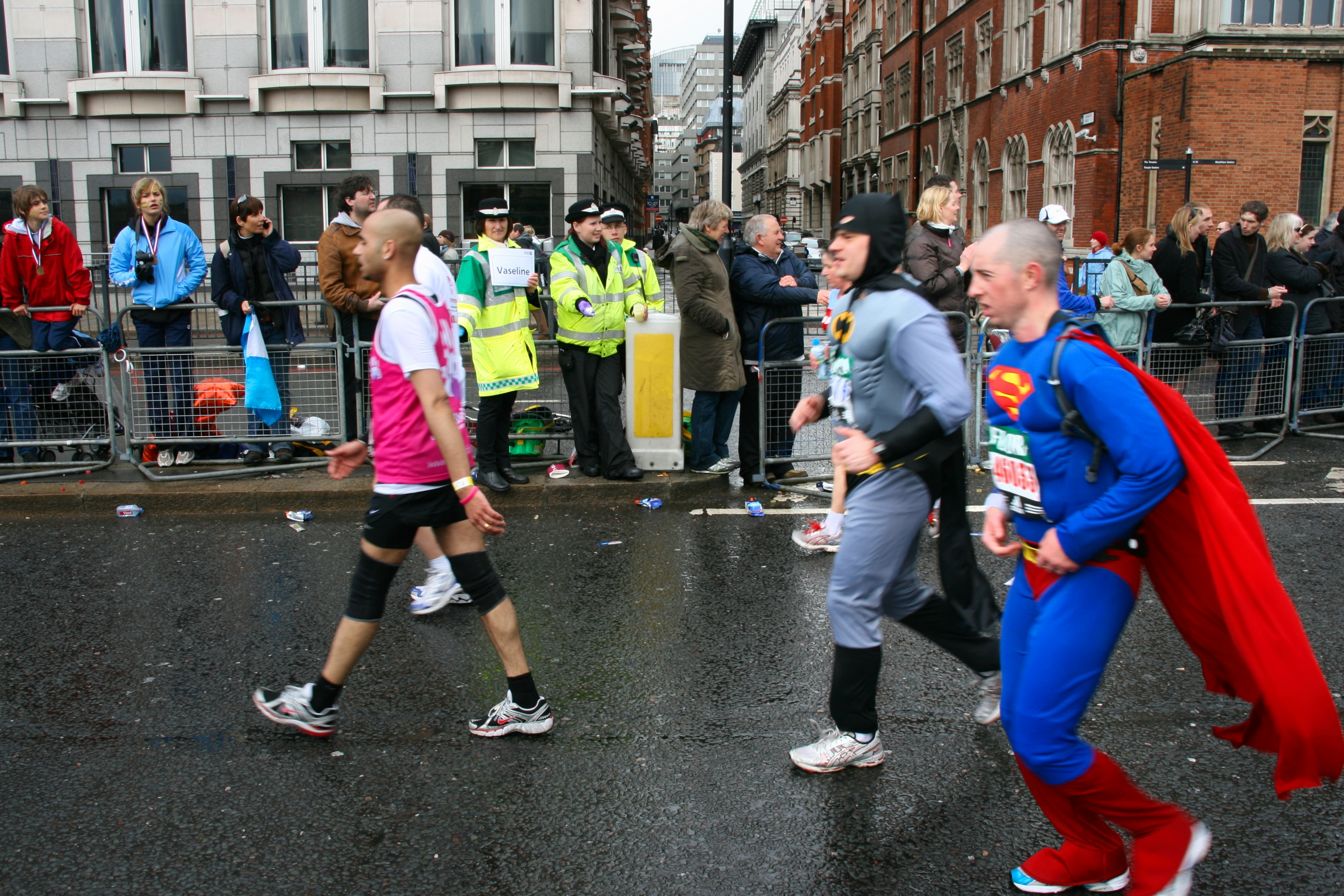
Charity runners wearing superhero costumes in 2008 London Marathon

A charity runner is a participant in a road race, usually of half marathon or marathon distance, who raises money or awareness for an established charitable organization. For more elite marathons, such as the World Marathon Majors, runners who are unable to obtain a qualifying time for their gender and age group can gain entry by running for an official charity affiliated with the race. Other races provide charity runners with free race entry, training, team shirts, and encouragement as incentives to raise money for local charities.

The Boston Marathon allows approximately 6000 runners who have not qualified, out of 30,000 total participants, into the annual race. Most of these runners have agreed to raise a minimum of $5000 or more to gain entry into this race. In 2017, the charity runners raised $34.2 million for over 200 different non-profit organizations.

== Relations between qualified runner and charity runners ==
According to Runner's World magazine, there is often animosity between qualified runners, who have met strict timing guidelines, and charity runners who do not meet the qualifying time, but are given a number for raising money for local charitable organizations and nonprofits. Some runners who meet the published qualifying time do not get into some major marathons due to the sheer volume of entries.

== Notable organizations and programs ==
- Team World Vision – operates in the Chicago Marathon, raising funds for clean water in Africa. It grew from ~100 runners in 2006 to over 1,200 in 2010, raising more than $1 million.
- Adım Adım Initiative – founded in Turkey in 2007, became the country’s largest amateur charity‑running group by 2011 and raised over USD 1 million by partnering with major marathons.
- Run for Heroes – launched in the UK in March 2020 during the COVID‑19 pandemic, raised over £7 million for NHS charities.
