= Samiyah Hassan Nour =

Djibouti athlete (born 1999)

Personal information
- Nationality: Djibouti
- Born: 5 December 1999 (age 26)

Sport
- Sport: Athletics
- Event: Long distance running

Achievements and titles
- Personal bests: 1500m:4:15.29 (Strasbourg, 2023); 5000m: 15:01.89 (Leiden, 2024) NR; 10000m: 33:21.50 (Kinshasa, 2023) NR
Medal record
Women's athletics
Representing Djibouti
African Championships
Silver medal – second place	2026 Accra	5000 m
Bronze medal – third place	2024 Douala	5000 m
Francophone Games
Bronze medal – third place	2023 Kinshasa	10,000m

Samiyah Hassan Nour (born 5 December 1999) is a long-distance runner from Djibouti. She is the national record holder over 5000 metres and 10,000 metres.

== Biography ==
She ran a personal best and national record 33:21.50 for the 10,000 metres to win bronze at the 2023 Francophone Games in Kinshasa.

In March 2024, she finished sixth in the 5000 metres at the delayed 2023 Africa Games in Accra.

In April 2024, she finished fourth in the 5 km road race at the Asics Festival of Running in Paris.

In May 2024, she finished second at the National Meeting de Carqufore over 5000 metres, running a personal best 15:11.76. She ran a 5000 metres personal best time in Leiden on 25 May 2024. In June 2024, she won bronze in the 5000m at the African Championships in Douala, Cameroon. She competed in the 5000 metres at the 2024 Summer Olympics in Paris in August 2024.

In September 2025, she competed over 5000 metres at the 2025 World Championships in Tokyo, Japan, without advancing to the final.

Olympic Games
Preceded by Aden-Alexandre Houssein	Flag bearer for Djibouti; Paris 2024 with Mohamed Ismail Ibrahim	Succeeded by Incumbent
