= Aden-Alexandre Houssein =

Djiboutian judoka (born 1998)

Personal information
- Born: 28 March 1998 (age 28) Compiègne, France
- Occupation: Judoka

Sport
- Country: Djibouti
- Sport: Judo
- Weight class: ‍–‍73 kg

Achievements and titles
- Olympic Games: R16 (2020)
- World Champ.: R32 (2021)
- African Champ.: (bronze) (2019, 2020)
Medal record
Men's judo
Representing Djibouti
African Games
Bronze medal – third place	2019 Rabat	‍–‍73 kg
Bronze medal – third place	2023 Accra	‍–‍73 kg
African Championships
Bronze medal – third place	2019 Cape Town	‍–‍73 kg
Bronze medal – third place	2020 Antananarivo	‍–‍73 kg

Profile at external databases
- IJF: 52149
- JudoInside.com: 138152
- Updated on 17 March 2024

Aden-Alexandre Houssein (born 28 March 1998) is a judoka. Born in France, he represents Djibouti internationally. He is a bronze medalist at the African Games and a two-time bronze medalist at the African Judo Championships.

== Career ==
He won one of the bronze medals in the men's 73 kg event at the 2019 African Judo Championships held in Cape Town, South Africa. In that year, he represented Djibouti at the 2019 African Games held in Rabat, Morocco, and he won one of the bronze medals in the men's 73 kg event.

In 2020, he also won one of the bronze medals in this event at the African Judo Championships held in Antananarivo, Madagascar. In 2021, he competed in the men's 73 kg event at the World Judo Championships held in Budapest, Hungary.

He represented Djibouti at the 2020 Summer Olympics in Tokyo, Japan. He was eliminated in his second match in the men's 73 kg event.

== Achievements ==
Year	Tournament	Place	Weight class
2019	African Championships	3rd	−73 kg
2019	African Games	3rd	−73 kg
2020	African Championships	3rd	−73 kg
2024	African Games	3rd	−73 kg

Olympic Games
Preceded by Abdi Waiss Mouhyadin	Flagbearer for Djibouti; Tokyo 2020	Succeeded by Mohamed Ismail Ibrahim; Samiyah Hassan Nour
