= Agnes Jebet Ngetich =

Kenyan track and field athlete

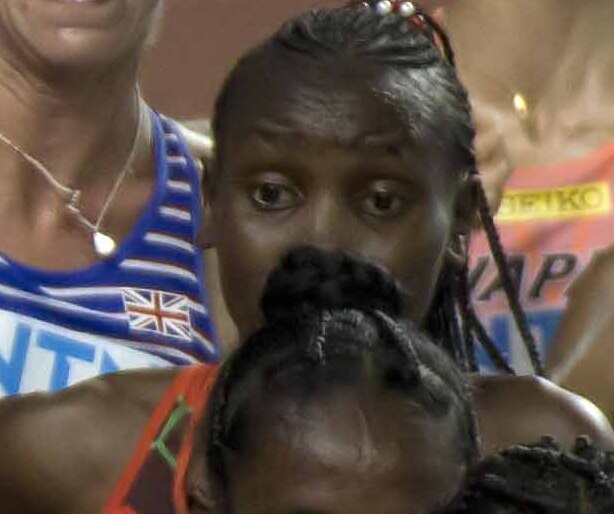
- Ngetich in the 10,000 m at the 2023 World Athletics Championships

Personal information
- Nationality: Kenyan
- Born: 23 January 2001 (age 25) Keiyo District

Sport
- Country: Kenya
- Sport: Athletics
- Event: Long-distance running

Achievements and titles
- Personal bests: Outdoors; 3000 m: 8:08.95 (Monaco 2026); 5000 m: 14:01.29 (Eugene 2025); 10,000 m: 30:27.28 (Nairobi 2025); Road; Mile: 4:36.51 (Honolulu 2018); 5 km: 14:13+ Mx (10K Valencia 2024); 10 km: 28:46 Mx WR (10K Valencia 2024); Half Marathon: 1:03:04 Mx (Valencia Half Marathon 2024) Wo: 1:05:15 WR (Copenhagen 2026)
Medal record
Women's athletics
Representing Kenya
World Road Running Championships
Gold medal – first place	2026 Copenhagen	Half marathon
Gold medal – first place	2026 Copenhagen	Half marathon team
World Cross Country Championships
Gold medal – first place	2023 Bathurst	Senior team
Gold medal – first place	2024 Belgrade	Senior team
Gold medal – first place	2026 Tallahassee	Senior race
Silver medal – second place	2026 Tallahassee	Senior team
Bronze medal – third place	2023 Bathurst	Senior race

Agnes Jebet Ngetich (born 23 January 2001) is a Kenyan long-distance runner. As of 2026, she holds the current world record in the women's only half marathon, with a time of 1:05:15 set at the 2026 World Athletics Road Running Championships. She is also the reigning World Cross Country Champion, having won the title at the 2026 World Cross Country Championships.

She previously won two gold medals with Kenya in the team events at the 2023 and 2024 World Cross Country Championships, with a bronze medal in the senior women's race in 2023. In January 2024, with a time of 28:46, she set the 10 km run world record in Valencia, breaking the previous record by 28 seconds. En route to this time, Ngetich also broke the 5 km run world record, splitting 14:13 at 5 km which was 6 seconds faster than the previous world record. Ngetich also holds the second fastest half marathon mark in history, at 1 hour 3 minutes and 4 seconds. She is coached by Julien Di Maria.

== Biography ==
At the age of 16, Ngetich placed 8th in the 2017 Under-20 Kenya National Cross Country. That same year, she finished 6th in the World Youth Trials, clocking 9:13.0 over 3000 meters.

In February 2018, Ngetich rose to 4th place in the Under-20 Kenya National Cross Country division. Shortly after, she secured another 4th position at the Under-20 Africa Cross Country Championship in Algeria, contributing to Kenya's Team Gold win. In March 2019, aged 18, Ngetich won the 5000 metres at the Kenya African Under-20 Trials.

In September 2022, Ngetich finished runner-up to Sheila Chepkirui at the Brasov Running Festival 10 km road race in Brașov, Romania.

=== 2023 ===
On 18 February 2023, aged 22, Ngetich won the bronze medal in the individual race and gold in the team standings at the World Cross Country Championships held in Bathurst, Australia.

In September 2023, Ngetich broke the women-only world 10 km record in the Transylvania 10 km in Brasov, Romania, with a time of 29:24. This surpassed the previous mark of 30:01 set by Agnes Tirop in Herzogenaurach in 2021. Ngetich completed the first 5 km in 14:25, which was four seconds faster than the previous women-only world record over this distance. The same month, the organizers of the run released a statement that the distance of the run was 25 m short which led to a non-record-eligible course.

=== 2024 ===
On 14 January 2024, Ngetich set a world record for the 10 km run by a woman in a mixed-gender race. At the 10K Valencia Ibercaja, she improved on the former world record of Yalemzerf Yehualaw by 28 seconds. Ngetich had a finishing time of 28:46, becoming the first woman to break the 29 minute barrier, on the roads or track. Her performance was faster than Letesenbet Gidey’s then-10,000 m world record of 29:01.03, and faster than the current 10,000 m world record of 28:54.14 set by Beatrice Chebet. She also improved the world record for the 5 km run by a woman in a mixed-gender race as she went through the 5 km checkpoint in 14:13, 6 seconds faster than the previous record set by Ethiopia's Ejgayehu Taye in 2021.

At the 2024 World Athletics Cross Country Championships in Serbia she finished in fifth place as Kenya won team gold.

On 27 October 2024, Ngetich won the Valencia Half Marathon in a time of 1 hour 3 minutes and 4 seconds, missing Letesenbet Gidey's world record of 1 hour 2 minutes and 52 seconds by 13 seconds. This time places Ngetich as the second fastest half marathon runner in history behind Gidey.

=== 2025 ===
On 22 February 2025, she won the Sirikwa Classic, the World Athletics Cross Country Tour Gold meeting in Eldoret. On 4 April 2025, she finished second in the opening Long Distance race of Grand Slam Track in Kingston, Jamaica, running 3000 metres in a personal best 8:28.75, to finish just behind Ejgayehu Taye. In the 5000 metres race that weekend, she again finished runner-up to Taye, running 14:59.80. She ran 14:25.80 to win the women's 5000 metres race at the second slam event in Miami on 2 May 2025, in a sprint finish with Medina Eisa of Ethiopia. In the subsequent 3000 metres she finished high enough in the standings to win the overall two-race format. She won the long distance category on 31 May 2025 at the 2025 Philadelphia Slam. In the 5000 metres at the 2025 Prefontaine Classic she finished in second place in 14:01.29, the third-fastest time in history, behind Beatrice Chebet's world record run. She won the 5000 metres in the 2025 Diamond League at the 2025 Memorial Van Damme in Brussels, Belgium.

She was named in the Kenyan team for the 5000 metres and the 10,000 metres at the 2025 World Athletics Championships. She had a fourth-place finish in the women's 10,000 metres race. She was also a finalist in the women's 5000 metres, placing fifteenth.

On 26 October 2025 she won the Valencia Half Marathon for the second consecutive year in a world leading time of 1 hour 3 minutes and 8 seconds.

=== 2026 ===
Ngetich won the gold medal representing Kenyan in the women's senior race at the 2026 World Athletics Cross Country Championships in Tallahassee, winning by 42 seconds from Uganda's Joy Cheptoyek. She also won the silver medal in the team event with Kenya. In February, she won the Sirikwa Cross Country Classic in Kenya.

Ngetich ran 28:58, the third-fastest women's 10 km all-time, at the Urban Trail de Lille in France on 4 April 2026. In June, she won the New York Mini 10-K in a course and event record of 30:07, winning ahead of Tsigie Gebreselama and defending champion Hellen Obiri. On 10 July, she won the 3000m in a meeting record of 8:08.95 at the 2026 Herculis Diamond League event in Monaco, to move to third on the world all-time list.

On 20 September, Ngetich broke the world record in the women's only half marathon world record, running a time of 1:05:15 to win the gold medal at the 2026 World Athletics Road Running Championships in Copenhagen, breaking the previous best set by Peres Jepchirchir of 1:05:16 in 2021. With the performance she also led Kenya to the team gold medal in the event.

== Statistics ==
=== Circuit performances ===
Grand Slam Track results
Slam	Race group	Event	Pl.	Time	Prize money
2025 Kingston Slam	Long distance	3000 m	2nd	8:28.75	US$50,000
2025 Kingston Slam	Long distance	5000 m	2nd	14:59.80	US$50,000
2025 Miami Slam	Long distance	5000 m	1st	14:25.80	US$100,000
2025 Miami Slam	Long distance	3000 m	3rd	8:23.14	US$100,000
2025 Philadelphia Slam	Long distance	3000 m	1st	8:43.61	US$50,000

=== Personal bests ===
- All information taken from World Athletics Profile.

Category	Event	Time	Venue	Date	Notes
Outdoor Track	3000 m	8:08.95	Monaco	10 July 2026	
Outdoor Track	5000 m	14:36.70	Paris	9 June 2023	
Outdoor Track	10,000 m	31:34.83	Budapest	19 August 2023	
Road	Mile	4:36.51	Honolulu	8 December 2018	
Road	5 km	14:13+	Valencia	14 January 2024	World record, en route to 10 km
Road	10 km	28:46	Valencia	14 January 2024	World record
Road	Half marathon	1:03:04	Valencia	27 October 2024	2nd all time
