= Athletics at the 2024 Summer Olympics – Qualification =

This article details the qualifying phase for athletics at the 2024 Summer Olympics. More than 1,800 athletes, with an equal split between men and women, competed across forty-eight medal events (twenty-five in track, five in the road: marathon and racewalking, sixteen in the field, and two in combined) at the Games. The qualification window for the marathon races was from 1 November 2022 to 30 April 2024; for the 10,000 metres, combined events (heptathlon and decathlon), racewalks, and relays from 31 December 2022 to 30 June 2024; and for the remaining events on the program lineup from 1 July 2023 to 30 June 2024.

== Qualification summary ==
A National Olympic Committee (NOC) could enter a maximum of three qualified athletes in each individual event if all of them meet the entry standard during the qualifying period; and a maximum of one qualified relay team per event. Under the Universality rule, any NOC without a qualified athlete or relay team would have been permitted to send the highest-ranked male or female athlete to either of the following individual events, namely the 100 m, 800 m, or the marathon.

Similar to the 2020 edition, the qualification system for Paris 2024 was set on a dual pathway, where the initial half of the total quota (about fifty percent) was distributed to the athletes through the entry standards approved by the World Athletics council, with the remainder relying on the world ranking list within the qualifying period.

The entry standards could be obtained in various meets organized and approved by the World Athletics within the given timeframe. The qualification period for the marathon races occurred from 1 November 2022 to 30 April 2024; for the 10,000 metres, combined events (heptathlon and decathlon), racewalks, and relays from 31 December 2022 to 30 June 2024, with the rest of the individual track and field events running over an annual period (from 1 July 2023 to 30 June 2024).

For the marathon races, any runner ranked higher than the sixty-fifth-place athlete on the filtered Quota Place "Road to Paris" list on 30 January 2024 was deemed for immediate selection to his or her respective national team at the Games. Beyond the deadline, the remaining twenty percent of the total quota was determined by the same dual pathway qualification criteria outlined above without displacing any qualified athletes on the set date.

For the inaugural marathon race walking mixed relay, a maximum of twenty-five teams, each comprising a male and a female race walker, were entitled to compete in a four-leg race encompassing the marathon distance. Twenty-two teams directly booked a slot for their corresponding event at the Olympics through the 2024 World Athletics Race Walking Team Championships, from April 20–21, in Antalya, Turkey, while the remaining three teams outside the key qualifier were selected based on the World Athletics performance list for the mixed relays within the qualification period (31 December 2022 to 30 June 2024).

For the track relays, a maximum of sixteen qualified NOCs were entitled to each event. The top fourteen teams in each relay race at the 2024 World Athletics Relays, during May 2024 in Nassau, Bahamas, directly booked a slot for their corresponding event at the Olympics, while the remaining two teams outside the key qualifier were selected according to the World Athletics performance list for relays within the qualification period (31 December 2022, to 30 June 2024).

NOCs with more than three qualified athletes in an individual event could select any of them based on their own criteria. For example, the United States selects athletes based on the results achieved at the 2024 U.S. Olympic trials for track and field but enforces a policy of entering every qualified athlete. Sweden only enters athletes sufficient to reach at least the twelfth position, based on the assessment evaluated by the NOC.

For the second consecutive time, World Athletics published the qualification tracking tool Road to Paris on the statistics zone of the sport governing body's official website in the last quarter of 2023. This tool displayed the list of qualified athletes in each individual and relay event, particularly those officially selected by their respective NOC, either through the entry standards approved by World Athletics or the world ranking.

=== Entry standards ===
The entry standards must have been obtained at the 2023 World Championships (held from 19 to 27 August in Budapest, Hungary), continental championships, continental athletic meets, national championships and selection trials, and various international meets approved by World Athletics within the given qualification period listed above.

The following table outlines the individual entry standards for Paris 2024:

Men's events		Women's events	
Event	ES	Event	ES
100 m	10.00	100 m	11.07
200 m	20.16	200 m	22.57
400 m	45.00	400 m	50.95
800 m	1:44.70	800 m	1:59.30
1500 mª	3:33.50	1500 mª	4:02.50
5000 m	13:05.00	5000 m	14:52.00
10,000 m	27:00.00	10,000 m	30:40.00
110 m hurdles	13:27	100 m hurdles	12.77
400 m hurdles	48.70	400 m hurdles	54.85
3000 m steeplechase	8:15.00	3000 m steeplechase	9:23.00
Marathon	2:08:10	Marathon	2:26:50
20 km walk	1:20:10	20 km walk	1:29:20
High jump	2.33	High jump	1.97
Pole vault	5.82	Pole vault	4.73
Long jump	8.27	Long jump	6.86
Triple jump	17.22	Triple jump	14.55
Shot put	21.50	Shot put	18.80
Discus throw	67.20	Discus throw	64.50
Hammer throw	78.20	Hammer throw	74.00
Javelin throw	85.50	Javelin throw	64.00
Decathlon	8460	Heptathlon	6480

ª An equivalent to a mile run — 3:50.40 (for men) and 4:20.90 (for women)

== Track events ==
=== Men's track events ===
==== Men's 100 m ====
Note: The qualifying standards exclude indoor achievements or races with wind above 2.0 m/s.

Qualification standard	No. of athletes	NOC	Nominated athletes
Entry standard – 10.00	3	Great Britain	Jeremiah Azu; Louie Hinchliffe; Zharnel Hughes
Entry standard – 10.00	3	Jamaica	Ackeem Blake; Oblique Seville; Kishane Thompson
Entry standard – 10.00	3	United States	Kenny Bednarek; Fred Kerley; Noah Lyles
Entry standard – 10.00	2	Brazil	Felipe Bardi; Erik Cardoso
Entry standard – 10.00	2	Colombia	Ronal Longa; Jhonny Rentería
Entry standard – 10.00	1	Cuba	Reynaldo Espinosa; ~~Shainer Reginfo~~ (Note: Withdraw due to injury.)
Entry standard – 10.00	2	Italy	Chituru Ali; Marcell Jacobs
Entry standard – 10.00	2	Nigeria	Favour Ashe; Godson Oghenebrume
Entry standard – 10.00	1	Antigua and Barbuda	Cejhae Greene
Entry standard – 10.00	1	Botswana	Letsile Tebogo
Entry standard – 10.00	1	Cameroon	Emmanuel Eseme
Entry standard – 10.00	1	Canada	Andre De Grasse
Entry standard – 10.00	1	Germany	Owen Ansah
Entry standard – 10.00	1	Japan	Abdul Hakim Sani Brown
Entry standard – 10.00	1	Kenya	Ferdinand Omanyala
Entry standard – 10.00	1	Liberia	Emmanuel Matadi
Entry standard – 10.00	1	South Africa	Akani Simbine
Entry standard – 10.00	~~1~~	~~Suriname~~	~~Issam Asinga~~ (Note: Currently serving a 4 year ban for a doping adverse result.)
World Athletics Rankings	2	Bahamas	Terrence Jones; Wanya McCoy
World Athletics Rankings	2	Canada	Duan Asemota; Aaron Brown
World Athletics Rankings	2	Ghana	Benjamin Azamati; Abdul-Rasheed Saminu
World Athletics Rankings	2	Japan	Akihiro Higashida; Ryuichiro Sakai
World Athletics Rankings	2	South Africa	Shaun Maswanganyi; Benjamin Richardson
World Athletics Rankings	1	Austria	Markus Fuchs
World Athletics Rankings	1	Brazil	Paulo André de Oliveira
World Athletics Rankings	1	British Virgin Islands	Rikkoi Brathwaite
World Athletics Rankings	1	China	Xie Zhenye
World Athletics Rankings	1	Denmark	Simon Hansen
World Athletics Rankings	1	Dominican Republic	José González
World Athletics Rankings	0	~~France~~	~~Pablo Matéo~~ (Note: Not selected by NOC.)
World Athletics Rankings	1	Germany	Joshua Hartmann
World Athletics Rankings	1	Guyana	Emanuel Archibald
World Athletics Rankings	1	Iran	Hassan Taftian
World Athletics Rankings	1	Ivory Coast	Arthur Cissé
World Athletics Rankings	0	~~Netherlands~~	~~Raphael Bouju~~ (Note: Qualified for multiple events and chose not to participate in this event)
World Athletics Rankings	1	Nigeria	Kayinsola Ajayi
World Athletics Rankings	1	Oman	Ali Anwar Al-Balushi
World Athletics Rankings	1	Sweden	Henrik Larsson
World Athletics Rankings	1	Thailand	Puripol Boonson
World Athletics Rankings	1	Turkey	Kayhan Özer
Reallocation of rejected quotas	2	Australia	Joshua Azzopardi; Rohan Browning
Reallocation of rejected quotas	1	Poland	Oliwer Wdowik
Reallocation of rejected quotas	1	Trinidad and Tobago	Devin Augustine
Universality places	1	Albania	Franko Burraj
Universality places	1	Angola	Marcos Santos
Universality places	1	Bangladesh	Imranur Rahman
Universality places	1	Benin	Didier Kiki
Universality places	1	Belize	Shaun Gill
Universality places	1	Brunei	Muhd Noor Firdaus Ar-Rasyid
Universality places	1	Cayman Islands	Davonte Howell
Universality places	1	Central African Republic	Herve Toumandji
Universality places	1	Comoros	Hachim Maaroufou
Universality places	1	Democratic Republic of the Congo	Dominique Mulamba
Universality places	1	Timor-Leste	Manuel Ataide
Universality places	1	Equatorial Guinea	Remigio Santander Villarubia
Universality places	1	Eswatini	Sibusiso Matsenjwa
Universality places	1	Federated States of Micronesia	Scott Fiti
Universality places	1	Fiji	Waisake Tewa
Universality places	1	Gabon	Wissy Frank Hoye Yenda Moukoula
Universality places	1	The Gambia	Ebrahima Camara
Universality places	1	Guinea-Bissau	Seco Camara
Universality places	1	Haiti	Christopher Borzor
Universality places	1	Honduras	Melique García
Universality places	1	Hong Kong	Felix Diu
Universality places	1	Indonesia	Lalu Muhammad Zohri
Universality places	1	Iraq	Taha Hussein Yaseen
Universality places	1	Kiribati	Kenaz Kaniwete
Universality places	1	Lebanon	Noureddine Hadid
Universality places	1	Libya	Ahmed Essabai
Universality places	1	Madagascar	Rija Vatomanga Gardiner
Universality places	1	Malaysia	Muhd Azeem Fahmi
Universality places	1	Maldives	Ibadulla Adam
Universality places	1	Marshall Islands	William Reed
Universality places	1	Mali	Fodé Sissoko
Universality places	1	Malta	Beppe Grillo
Universality places	1	Mauritius	Noa Bibi
Universality places	1	Montenegro	Darko Pešić
Universality places	1	Mozambique	Steven Sabino
Universality places	1	Nauru	Winzar Kakiouea
Universality places	1	Panama	Arturo Deliser
Universality places	1	Saint Kitts and Nevis	Naquille Harris
Universality places	1	Seychelles	Dylan Sicobo
Universality places	1	Singapore	Marc Brian Louis
Universality places	1	Suriname	Jalen Lisse
Universality places	1	Tajikistan	Favoriz Muzrapov
Universality places	1	Tonga	Maleselo Fufofuka
Universality places	1	Tuvalu	Karalo Maibuca
Universality places	1	Yemen	Samer Al-Yafaee
Invitational Places	1	Afghanistan	Sha Mahmood Noor Zahi
Invitational Places	1	Guam	Joseph Green
Invitational Places	1	Refugee Olympic Team	Dorian Keletela
Total	102		

==== Men's 200 m ====
Note: The qualifying standards exclude indoor achievements.

Qualification standard	No. of athletes	NOC	Nominated athletes
Entry standard – 20.16	3	Canada	Aaron Brown; Andre De Grasse; Brendon Rodney
Entry standard – 20.16	3	South Africa	Luxolo Adams; Shaun Maswanganyi; Benjamin Richardson
Entry standard – 20.16	3	United States	Kenny Bednarek; Erriyon Knighton; Noah Lyles
Entry standard – 20.16	2	Jamaica	Andrew Hudson; Bryan Levell
Entry standard – 20.16	2	Zimbabwe	Makanakaishe Charamba; Tapiwanashe Makarawu
Entry standard – 20.16	1	Bahamas	Wanya McCoy
Entry standard – 20.16	1	Botswana	Letsile Tebogo
Entry standard – 20.16	1	China	Xie Zhenye
Entry standard – 20.16	1	Dominican Republic	Alexander Ogando
Entry standard – 20.16	1	France	Pablo Matéo
Entry standard – 20.16	0	~~Ghana~~	~~Abdul-Rasheed Saminu~~
Entry standard – 20.16	1	Germany	Joshua Hartmann
Entry standard – 20.16	1	Great Britain	Zharnel Hughes
Entry standard – 20.16	1	Italy	Filippo Tortu
Entry standard – 20.16	1	Ivory Coast	Cheickna Traore
Entry standard – 20.16	1	Liberia	Joseph Fahnbulleh
Entry standard – 20.16	1	Nigeria	Udodi Onwuzurike
Entry standard – 20.16	1	Trinidad and Tobago	Jereem Richards
Entry standard – 20.16	1	Uganda	Tarsis Orogot
World Athletics Rankings	3	Czech Republic	Eduard Kubelík; Ondřej Macík; Tomáš Nĕmejc
World Athletics Rankings	3	Japan	Shota Iizuka; Koki Ueyama; Towa Uzawa
World Athletics Rankings	2	Switzerland	Timothé Mumenthaler; William Reais
World Athletics Rankings	1	Australia	Calab Law
World Athletics Rankings	1	Bahamas	Ian Kerr
World Athletics Rankings	1	Brazil	Renan Gallina
World Athletics Rankings	1	Chinese Taipei	Yang Chun-han
World Athletics Rankings	1	Dominican Republic	José González
World Athletics Rankings	1	France	Ryan Zeze
World Athletics Rankings	1	Israel	Blessing Afrifah
World Athletics Rankings	1	Italy	Fausto Desalu
World Athletics Rankings	0	~~Panama~~	~~Alonso Edward~~
World Athletics Rankings	1	Paraguay	César Almirón
World Athletics Rankings	1	Poland	Albert Komański
World Athletics Rankings	0	~~Spain~~	~~Pol Retamal~~
World Athletics Rankings	1	Sweden	Erik Erlandsson
Reallocation of rejected quotas	1	Italy	Diego Pettorossi
Reallocation of rejected quotas	1	Switzerland	Felix Svensson
Total	48		

==== Men's 400 m ====
Qualification standard	No. of athletes	NOC	Nominated athletes
Entry standard – 45.00	3	Botswana	Busang Kebinatshipi; Bayapo Ndori; Leungo Scotch
Entry standard – 45.00	2	Brazil	~~Alison dos Santos~~; Lucas Carvalho; Matheus Lima
Entry standard – 45.00	3	Jamaica	Sean Bailey; Rusheen McDonald; Deandre Watkin
Entry standard – 45.00	3	United States	Quincy Hall; Michael Norman; Christopher Bailey
Entry standard – 45.00	2	Nigeria	~~Emmanuel Bamidele~~; Samuel Ogazi; Chidi Okezie
Entry standard – 45.00	2	South Africa	~~Wayde van Niekerk~~; Zakithi Nene; Lythe Pillay
Entry standard – 45.00	2	Belgium	Alexander Doom; Jonathan Sacoor
Entry standard – 45.00	2	Great Britain	Charlie Dobson; Matthew Hudson-Smith
Entry standard – 45.00	2	Japan	Fuga Sato; Kentaro Sato
Entry standard – 45.00	1	Argentina	Elián Larregina
Entry standard – 45.00	1	Australia	Reece Holder
Entry standard – 45.00	1	Bahamas	Steven Gardiner
Entry standard – 45.00	1	Canada	Christopher Morales Williams
Entry standard – 45.00	1	Dominican Republic	Alexander Ogando
Entry standard – 45.00	1	Germany	Jean Paul Bredau
Entry standard – 45.00	1	Grenada	Kirani James
Entry standard – 45.00	1	Hungary	Attila Molnár
Entry standard – 45.00	1	Italy	Luca Sito
Entry standard – 45.00	1	Kenya	Zablon Ekwam
Entry standard – 45.00	1	Netherlands	Liemarvin Bonevacia
Entry standard – 45.00	1	Norway	Håvard Bentdal Ingvaldsen
Entry standard – 45.00	1	Portugal	João Coelho
Entry standard – 45.00	1	Saint Lucia	Michael Joseph
Entry standard – 45.00	1	Trinidad and Tobago	Jereem Richards
Entry standard – 45.00	1	Ukraine	Oleksandr Pohorilko
Entry standard – 45.00	1	Zambia	Muzala Samukonga
World Athletics Rankings	1	Belgium	Dylan Borlée
World Athletics Rankings	1	Czech Republic	Matěj Krsek
World Athletics Rankings	1	France	Gilles Biron
World Athletics Rankings	0	~~Germany~~	~~Manuel Sanders~~
World Athletics Rankings	1	Japan	Yuki Joseph Nakajima
World Athletics Rankings	1	Senegal	Cheikh Tidiane Diouf
World Athletics Rankings	1	Switzerland	Lionel Spitz
Reallocation of rejected quotas	1	Colombia	Anthony Zambrano
Reallocation of rejected quotas	1	Italy	Davide Re
Reallocation of rejected quotas	1	Qatar	Ammar Ibrahim
Reallocation of rejected quotas	1	Sri Lanka	Aruna Darshana
Total	48		

==== Men's 800 m ====
Qualification standard	No. of athletes	NOC	Nominated athletes
Entry standard – 1:44.70	3	Algeria	Mohamed Ali Gouaned; Slimane Moula; Djamel Sedjati
Entry standard – 1:44.70	3	Australia	Peter Bol; Peyton Craig; Joseph Deng
Entry standard – 1:44.70	3	Belgium	Eliott Crestan; Tibo De Smet; Pieter Sisk
Entry standard – 1:44.70	3	France	Corentin Le Clezio; Benjamin Robert; Gabriel Tual
Entry standard – 1:44.70	3	Great Britain	Max Burgin; Elliot Giles; Ben Pattison
Entry standard – 1:44.70	3	Kenya	Koitatoi Kidali; Wyclife Kinyamal; Emmanuel Wanyonyi
Entry standard – 1:44.70	3	Spain	Mohamed Attaoui; Adrián Ben; Elvin Josué Canales
Entry standard – 1:44.70	3	United States	Bryce Hoppel; Hobbs Kessler; Brandon Miller
Entry standard – 1:44.70	2	Botswana	Kethobogile Haingura; Tshepiso Masalela
Entry standard – 1:44.70	2	Italy	Simone Barontini; Catalin Tecuceanu
Entry standard – 1:44.70	1	Canada	Marco Arop
Entry standard – 1:44.70	1	Ireland	Mark English
Entry standard – 1:44.70	1	Jamaica	Navasky Anderson
Entry standard – 1:44.70	1	Morocco	Abdelati El Guesse
Entry standard – 1:44.70	1	New Zealand	James Preston
Entry standard – 1:44.70	1	Nigeria	Edose Ibadin
Entry standard – 1:44.70	1	Norway	Tobias Grønstad
Entry standard – 1:44.70	1	Poland	Mateusz Borkowski
Entry standard – 1:44.70	1	Qatar	Abubaker Haydar Abdalla
Entry standard – 1:44.70	1	South Africa	Edmund du Plessis
Entry standard – 1:44.70	1	Sweden	Andreas Kramer
Entry standard – 1:44.70	1	Venezuela	José Antonio Maita
World Athletics Rankings	1	Botswana	Tumo Nkape
World Athletics Rankings	1	Czech Republic	Jakub Dudycha
World Athletics Rankings	1	Mexico	Jesús Tonatiú López
World Athletics Rankings	1	Netherlands	Ryan Clarke
World Athletics Rankings	1	Uganda	Tom Dradriga
Universality places	1	Armenia	Yervand Mkrtchyan
Universality places	1	Cambodia	Chhun Bunthorn
Universality places	1	Cook Islands	Alex Beddoes
Universality places	1	Dominica	Dennick Luke
Universality places	1	Saint Vincent and the Grenadines	Handal Roban
Universality places	1	Somalia	Ali Idow Hassan
Universality places	1	South Sudan	Abraham Guem
Invitational Places	1	Refugee Olympic Team	Musa Suliman
Invitational Places	1	Palestine	Mohammed Dwedar
Total	53		

==== Men's 1500 m ====
Note: The qualifying standards also include achievements in the mile run (3:50.40).

Qualification standard	No. of athletes	NOC	Nominated athletes
Entry standard – 3:33.50	3	Australia	Oliver Hoare; Stewart McSweyn; Adam Spencer
Entry standard – 3:33.50	3	Great Britain	Neil Gourley; Josh Kerr; George Mills
Entry standard – 3:33.50	3	Kenya	Reynold Cheruiyot; Timothy Cheruiyot; Brian Komen
Entry standard – 3:33.50	3	United States	Cole Hocker; Hobbs Kessler; Yared Nuguse
Entry standard – 3:33.50	2	Belgium	Ruben Verheyden; Jochem Vermeulen
Entry standard – 3:33.50	2	Ethiopia	Abdisa Fayisa; Samuel Tefera
Entry standard – 3:33.50	2	France	Maël Gouyette; Azeddine Habz
Entry standard – 3:33.50	2	Norway	Jakob Ingebrigtsen; Narve Gilje Nordås
Entry standard – 3:33.50	2	Spain	Mario García; Adel Mechaal
Entry standard – 3:33.50	1	New Zealand	~~George Beamish~~; Sam Tanner
Entry standard – 3:33.50	1	Canada	Charles Philibert-Thiboutot
Entry standard – 3:33.50	1	Germany	Robert Farken
Entry standard – 3:33.50	1	Ireland	Andrew Coscoran
Entry standard – 3:33.50	1	Italy	Pietro Arese
Entry standard – 3:33.50	1	Morocco	Anass Essayi
Entry standard – 3:33.50	1	Netherlands	Niels Laros
Entry standard – 3:33.50	1	Portugal	Isaac Nader
Entry standard – 3:33.50	1	South Africa	Tshepo Tshite
World Athletics Rankings	2	Ireland	Cathal Doyle; Luke McCann
World Athletics Rankings	2	Italy	Ossama Meslek; Federico Riva
World Athletics Rankings	1	Austria	Raphael Pallitsch
World Athletics Rankings	1	Canada	Kieran Lumb
World Athletics Rankings	1	Ethiopia	Ermias Girma
World Athletics Rankings	0	~~France~~	~~Romain Mornet~~
World Athletics Rankings	1	Germany	Marius Probst
World Athletics Rankings	1	Netherlands	Stefan Nillessen
World Athletics Rankings	1	South Africa	Ryan Mphahlele
World Athletics Rankings	1	Spain	Ignacio Fontes
World Athletics Rankings	1	Sweden	Samuel Pihlström
Reallocation of rejected quotas	2	Poland	Filip Rak; Maciej Wyderka
Total	46		

==== Men's 5000 m ====
Qualification standard	No. of athletes	NOC	Nominated athletes
Entry standard – 13:05.00	3	Ethiopia	Hagos Gebrhiwet; Biniam Mehary; Addisu Yihune
Entry standard – 13:05.00	3	France	Hugo Hay; Jimmy Gressier; Yann Schrub
Entry standard – 13:05.00	3	Great Britain	Patrick Dever; George Mills; Sam Atkin
Entry standard – 13:05.00	3	Kenya	Jacob Krop; Edwin Kurgat; Ronald Kwemoi
Entry standard – 13:05.00	3	Uganda	Oscar Chelimo; Joshua Cheptegei; Jacob Kiplimo
Entry standard – 13:05.00	3	United States	Graham Blanks; Grant Fisher; Abdihamid Nur
Entry standard – 13:05.00	2	Australia	Morgan McDonald; Stewart McSweyn
Entry standard – 13:05.00	2	Belgium	John Heymans; Isaac Kimeli
Entry standard – 13:05.00	2	Canada	Mohammed Ahmed; Ben Flanagan
Entry standard – 13:05.00	2	Djibouti	Mohamed Ismail Ibrahim; Abdi Waiss
Entry standard – 13:05.00	1	Bahrain	Birhanu Balew
Entry standard – 13:05.00	1	Burundi	Egide Ntakarutimana
Entry standard – 13:05.00	1	Eritrea	Aron Kifle
Entry standard – 13:05.00	1	Guatemala	Luis Grijalva
Entry standard – 13:05.00	1	Ireland	Brian Fay
Entry standard – 13:05.00	0	~~New Zealand~~	~~George Beamish~~
Entry standard – 13:05.00	0	~~South Africa~~	~~Adriaan Wildschutt~~
Entry standard – 13:05.00	1	Spain	Thierry Ndikumwenayo
Entry standard – 13:05.00	1	Sweden	Andreas Almgren
Entry standard – 13:05.00	0	Switzerland	~~Dominic Lobalu~~ (Note: Ineligible to compete for Switzerland as a non-national per Section 41 of the Olympic Charter.)
World Athletics Rankings	2	Norway	Jakob Ingebrigtsen; Narve Gilje Nordås
World Athletics Rankings	1	Canada	Thomas Fafard
World Athletics Rankings	1	Netherlands	Mike Foppen
World Athletics Rankings	1	Spain	Adel Mechaal
World Athletics Rankings	1	Uruguay	Santiago Catrofe
Reallocation of rejected quotas	1	Eritrea	Dawit Seare
Reallocation of rejected quotas	1	Serbia	Elzan Bibić
Reallocation of rejected quotas	1	Switzerland	Jonas Raess
Invitational Places	1	Refugee Olympic Team	Dominic Lobalu
Total	43		

==== Men's 10,000 m ====
Qualification standard	No. of athletes	NOC	Nominated athletes
Entry standard – 27:00.00	3	Ethiopia	Berihu Aregawi; Selemon Barega; Yomif Kejelcha
Entry standard – 27:00.00	3	Kenya	Benard Kibet; Nicholas Kipkorir; Daniel Mateiko
Entry standard – 27:00.00	3	United States	Grant Fisher; Woody Kincaid; Nico Young
Entry standard – 27:00.00	1	Eritrea	Merhawi Mebrahtu; ~~Habtom Samuel~~
Entry standard – 27:00.00	2	Uganda	Joshua Cheptegei; Jacob Kiplimo
Entry standard – 27:00.00	1	Bahrain	Birhanu Balew
Entry standard – 27:00.00	1	Canada	Mohammed Ahmed
Entry standard – 27:00.00	1	South Africa	Adriaan Wildschutt
Entry standard – 27:00.00	0	~~Sweden~~	~~Andreas Almgren~~
Cross Country Rankings	2	Burundi	Rodrigue Kwizera; Célestin Ndikumana
Cross Country Rankings	2	Spain	Thierry Ndikumwenayo; Abdessamad Oukhelfen
Cross Country Rankings	1	Belgium	Isaac Kimeli
Cross Country Rankings	1	France	Yann Schrub
Cross Country Rankings	1	Rwanda	Yves Nimubona
Cross Country Rankings	1	Uganda	Martin Magengo Kiprotich
World Athletics Rankings	1	France	Jimmy Gressier
World Athletics Rankings	1	Japan	Tomoki Ota
Reallocation of rejected quotas	1	Japan	Jun Kasai
Invitational Places	1	Refugee Olympic Team	Jamal Abdelmaji Eisa Mohammed
Total	26		

==== Men's 110 m hurdles ====
Note: The qualifying standards exclude indoor achievements or races with wind above 2.0 m/s.

Qualification standard	No. of athletes	NOC	Nominated athletes
Entry standard – 13.27	3	France	Wilhem Belocian; Raphaël Mohamed; Sasha Zhoya
Entry standard – 13.27	3	Jamaica	Orlando Bennett; Rasheed Broadbell; Hansle Parchment
Entry standard – 13.27	3	United States	Freddie Crittenden; Grant Holloway; Daniel Roberts
Entry standard – 13.27	2	Brazil	Rafael Pereira; Eduardo Rodrigues
Entry standard – 13.27	2	Japan	Shunsuke Izumiya; Rachid Muratake
Entry standard – 13.27	2	Poland	Damian Czykier; Jakub Szymański
Entry standard – 13.27	1	Great Britain	Tade Ojora; ~~Andrew Pozzi~~
Entry standard – 13.27	1	Belgium	Michael Obasuyi
Entry standard – 13.27	1	China	Xu Zhuoyi
Entry standard – 13.27	0	~~Cuba~~	~~Roger Iribarne~~
Entry standard – 13.27	1	Italy	Lorenzo Simonelli
Entry standard – 13.27	1	Senegal	Louis François Mendy
Entry standard – 13.27	1	Spain	Enrique Llopis
Entry standard – 13.27	1	Switzerland	Jason Joseph
World Athletics Rankings	2	China	Liu Junxi; Qin Weibo
World Athletics Rankings	1	Algeria	Amine Bouanani
World Athletics Rankings	1	Australia	Tayleb Willis
World Athletics Rankings	1	Austria	Enzo Diessl
World Athletics Rankings	1	Bahamas	Antoine Andrews
World Athletics Rankings	1	Belgium	Elie Bacari
World Athletics Rankings	1	Chile	Martín Sáenz
World Athletics Rankings	1	Cyprus	Milan Trajkovic
World Athletics Rankings	1	Finland	Elmo Lakka
World Athletics Rankings	0	~~Great Britain~~	~~David King~~
World Athletics Rankings	1	Japan	Shunya Takayama
World Athletics Rankings	1	Kazakhstan	David Yefremov
World Athletics Rankings	1	Kuwait	Yaqoub Alyouha
World Athletics Rankings	1	Philippines	John Cabang
World Athletics Rankings	1	Spain	Asier Martínez
Reallocation of rejected quotas	1	Canada	Craig Thorne
Reallocation of rejected quotas	1	Germany	Manuel Mordi
Reallocation of rejected quotas	1	Poland	Krzysztof Kiljan
Total	40		

==== Men's 400 m hurdles ====
Qualification standard	No. of athletes	NOC	Nominated athletes
Entry standard – 48.70	3	Germany	Joshua Abuaku; Emil Agyekum; Constantin Preis
Entry standard – 48.70	3	Jamaica	Roshawn Clarke; Jaheel Hyde; Malik James-King
Entry standard – 48.70	3	Japan	Daiki Ogawa; Ken Toyoda; Kaito Tsutsue
Entry standard – 48.70	3	Qatar	Ismail Doudai Abakar; Abderrahman Alsaleck; Bassem Hemeida
Entry standard – 48.70	3	United States	CJ Allen; Trevor Bassitt; Rai Benjamin
Entry standard – 48.70	3	France	Ludvy Vaillant; Wilfried Happio; Clément Ducos
Entry standard – 48.70	2	Brazil	Alison dos Santos; Matheus Lima
Entry standard – 48.70	2	Sweden	Carl Bengtström; Oskar Edlund
Entry standard – 48.70	2	Turkey	Berke Akçam; Yasmani Copello
Entry standard – 48.70	1	British Virgin Islands	Kyron McMaster
Entry standard – 48.70	1	Chinese Taipei	Peng Ming-yang
Entry standard – 48.70	1	Costa Rica	Gerald Drummond
Entry standard – 48.70	1	Czech Republic	Vit Müller
Entry standard – 48.70	1	Estonia	Rasmus Mägi
Entry standard – 48.70	1	Great Britain	Alastair Chalmers
Entry standard – 48.70	1	Italy	Alessandro Sibilio
Entry standard – 48.70	1	Kenya	Wiseman Mukhobe
Entry standard – 48.70	1	Netherlands	Nick Smidt
Entry standard – 48.70	1	Nigeria	Ezekiel Nathaniel
Entry standard – 48.70	1	Norway	Karsten Warholm
Entry standard – 48.70	1	Slovenia	Matic Ian Guček
Entry standard – 48.70	1	Switzerland	Julien Bonvin
World Athletics Rankings	1	Botswana	Victor Ntweng
World Athletics Rankings	1	China	Xie Zhiyu
World Athletics Rankings	1	Dominican Republic	Yeral Nuñez
Reallocation of rejected quotas			
Total	40		

==== Men's 3000 m steeplechase ====
Qualification standard	No. of athletes	NOC	Nominated athletes
Entry standard – 8:15.00	3	Ethiopia	Samuel Firewu; Lamecha Girma; Getnet Wale
Entry standard – 8:15.00	3	Kenya	Abraham Kibiwot; Simon Koech; Amos Serem
Entry standard – 8:15.00	2	France	Louis Gilavert; Alexis Miellet
Entry standard – 8:15.00	2	Morocco	Soufiane El Bakkali; Mohamed Tindouft
Entry standard – 8:15.00	1	Spain	Daniel Arce; ~~Victor Ruiz~~
Entry standard – 8:15.00	2	Tunisia	Ahmed Jaziri; Mohamed Amin Jhinaoui
Entry standard – 8:15.00	1	Germany	Karl Bebendorf
Entry standard – 8:15.00	1	India	Avinash Sable
Entry standard – 8:15.00	1	Japan	Ryuji Miura
Entry standard – 8:15.00	1	New Zealand	George Beamish
Entry standard – 8:15.00	1	United States	James Corrigan
World Athletics Rankings	0	~~Sweden~~	
World Athletics Rankings	2	Australia	Ben Buckingham; Matthew Clarke
World Athletics Rankings	2	Italy	Yassin Bouih; Osama Zoghlami
World Athletics Rankings	2	United States	Kenneth Rooks; Matthew Wilkinson
World Athletics Rankings	1	Andorra	Nahuel Carabaña
World Athletics Rankings	1	Canada	Jean-Simon Desgagnés
World Athletics Rankings	1	France	Nicolas-Marie Daru
World Athletics Rankings	1	Germany	Frederik Ruppert
World Athletics Rankings	0	~~Great Britain~~	~~Phil Norman~~
World Athletics Rankings	1	Japan	Ryoma Aoki
World Athletics Rankings	1	Morocco	Faid El Mostafa
World Athletics Rankings	1	Uganda	Leonard Chemutai
Reallocation of rejected quotas	1	Algeria	Bilal Tabti
Reallocation of rejected quotas	1	Czech Republic	Tomáš Habarta
Reallocation of rejected quotas	1	Finland	Topi Raitanen
Reallocation of rejected quotas	1	Germany	Velten Schneider
Reallocation of rejected quotas	1	Luxembourg	Ruben Querinjean
Total	36		

=== Women's track events ===
==== Women's 100 m ====
Note: The qualifying standards exclude indoor achievements or races with wind above 2.0 m/s.

Qualification standard	No. of athletes	NOC	Nominated athletes
Entry standard – 11.07	3	Great Britain	Dina Asher-Smith; Imani-Lara Lansiquot; Daryll Neita
Entry standard – 11.07	3	Jamaica	Tia Clayton; Shelly-Ann Fraser-Pryce; Shericka Jackson
Entry standard – 11.07	2	Nigeria	Tima Godbless; Rosemary Chukwuma; ~~Favour Ofili~~
Entry standard – 11.07	3	United States	Melissa Jefferson; Sha'Carri Richardson; Twanisha Terry
Entry standard – 11.07	2	Germany	Gina Lückenkemper; Rebekka Haase
Entry standard – 11.07	2	Liberia	Thelma Davies; Destiny Smith-Barnett
Entry standard – 11.07	1	Antigua and Barbuda	Joella Lloyd
Entry standard – 11.07	0	~~Bahamas~~	~~Anthonique Strachan~~
Entry standard – 11.07	1	Canada	Audrey Leduc
Entry standard – 11.07	1	France	Gémima Joseph
Entry standard – 11.07	1	The Gambia	Gina Bass
Entry standard – 11.07	1	Italy	Zaynab Dosso
Entry standard – 11.07	1	Ivory Coast	Marie-Josée Ta Lou
Entry standard – 11.07	1	Luxembourg	Patrizia van der Weken
Entry standard – 11.07	1	New Zealand	Zoe Hobbs
Entry standard – 11.07	1	Poland	Ewa Swoboda
Entry standard – 11.07	1	Saint Lucia	Julien Alfred
Entry standard – 11.07	1	Switzerland	Mujinga Kambundji
World Athletics Rankings	2	Belgium	Rani Rosius; Delphine Nkansa
World Athletics Rankings	2	Switzerland	Géraldine Frey; Salomé Kora
World Athletics Rankings	2	Trinidad and Tobago	Michelle-Lee Ahye; Leah Bertrand
World Athletics Rankings	1	Australia	Ella Connolly
World Athletics Rankings	1	Barbados	Tristan Evelyn
World Athletics Rankings	1	Brazil	Vitória Cristina Rosa
World Athletics Rankings	1	China	Ge Manqi
World Athletics Rankings	1	Cuba	Yunisleidy García
World Athletics Rankings	1	Cyprus	Olivia Fotopoulou
World Athletics Rankings	1	Czech Republic	Karolína Maňasová
World Athletics Rankings	1	Ecuador	Ángela Tenorio
World Athletics Rankings	1	Finland	Lotta Kemppinen
World Athletics Rankings	0	~~France~~	~~Orlann Oliere~~
World Athletics Rankings	1	Greece	Polyniki Emmanouilidou
World Athletics Rankings	1	Hungary	Boglárka Takács
World Athletics Rankings	1	Iran	Farzaneh Fasihi
World Athletics Rankings	1	Ivory Coast	Maboundou Koné
World Athletics Rankings	0	~~Liberia~~	~~Maia McCoy~~
World Athletics Rankings	0	~~Netherlands~~	~~N'Ketia Seedo~~
World Athletics Rankings	1	Poland	Magdalena Stefanowicz
World Athletics Rankings	1	Portugal	Lorène Dorcas Bazolo
World Athletics Rankings	1	Singapore	Veronica Shanti Pereira
World Athletics Rankings	1	Slovakia	Viktória Forster
World Athletics Rankings	0	~~Spain~~	~~Jaël Bestué~~
World Athletics Rankings	1	Sweden	Julia Henriksson
Reallocation of rejected quotas	1	Australia	Bree Masters
Reallocation of rejected quotas	1	Brazil	Ana Azevedo
Reallocation of rejected quotas	1	Canada	Jacqueline Madogo
Reallocation of rejected quotas	1	Mexico	Cecilia Tamayo-Garza
Reallocation of rejected quotas	1	Puerto Rico	Gladymar Torres
Universality places	1	American Samoa	Filomenaleonisa Iakopo
Universality places	1	Bolivia	Guadalupe Torrez
Universality places	1	Chinese Taipei	Zhang Bo-ya
Universality places	1	Georgia	Lika Kharchilava
Universality places	1	Grenada	Halle Hazzard
Universality places	1	Guam	Regine Tugade
Universality places	1	Guatemala	Mariandrée Chacón
Universality places	1	Guinea	Safiatou Acquaviva
Universality places	1	Laos	Silina Pha Aphay
Universality places	1	Malawi	Asimenye Simwaka
Universality places	1	Mauritania	Salam Bouha Ahamdy
Universality places	1	Monaco	Marie-Charlotte Gastaud
Universality places	1	Nicaragua	María Carmona
Universality places	1	Niger	Samira Awali Boubacar
Universality places	1	Pakistan	Faiqa Riaz
Universality places	1	Palau	Sydney Francisco
Universality places	1	Papua New Guinea	Leonie Beu
Universality places	1	Paraguay	Xenia Hiebert
Universality places	1	Qatar	Shahad Mohammed
Universality places	1	Republic of the Congo	Natacha Ngoye Akamabi
Universality places	1	San Marino	Alessandra Gasparelli
Universality places	1	São Tomé and Príncipe	Gorete Semedo
Universality places	1	Saudi Arabia	Hibah Mohammed
Universality places	1	Sierra Leone	Georgiana Sesay
Universality places	1	Solomon Islands	Sharon Firisua
Universality places	1	Syria	Alisar Youssef
Universality places	1	Togo	Naomi Akakpo
Universality places	1	Turkmenistan	Valentina Meredova
Universality places	1	United Arab Emirates	Mariam Kareem
Universality places	1	Vanuatu	Chloe David
Universality places	1	Vietnam	Trần Thị Nhi Yến
Invitational places	1	Afghanistan	Kamia Yousufi
Invitational places	1	Equatorial Guinea	Sefora Ada Eto
Invitational places	1	Oman	Mazoon Al-Alawi
Invitational places	1	Saint Kitts and Nevis	Zahria Allers-Liburd
Invitational places	1	South Sudan	Lucia Morris
Invitational places	1	Tuvalu	Temalini Manatoa
Total	87		

==== Women's 200 m ====
Note: The qualifying standards exclude indoor achievements.

Qualification standard	No. of athletes	NOC	Nominated athletes
Entry standard – 22.57	3	Great Britain	Dina Asher-Smith; Daryll Neita; Bianca Williams
Entry standard – 22.57	3	Ivory Coast	Jessika Gbai; Maboundou Koné; Marie-Josée Ta Lou
Entry standard – 22.57	3	Jamaica	Niesha Burgher; Shericka Jackson; Lanae-Tava Thomas
Entry standard – 22.57	3	United States	Brittany Brown; McKenzie Long; Gabby Thomas
Entry standard – 22.57	1	Nigeria	Favour Ofili; ~~Tima Godbless~~
Entry standard – 22.57	0	~~Bahamas~~	~~Anthonique Strachan~~
Entry standard – 22.57	1	Canada	Audrey Leduc
Entry standard – 22.57	1	France	Gémima Joseph
Entry standard – 22.57	0	~~Ireland~~	~~Rhasidat Adeleke~~
Entry standard – 22.57	1	Liberia	Thelma Davies
Entry standard – 22.57	1	Saint Lucia	Julien Alfred
Entry standard – 22.57	1	Singapore	Shanti Pereira
Entry standard – 22.57	1	Switzerland	Mujinga Kambundji
World Athletics Rankings	3	Ecuador	Nicole Caicedo; Aimara Nazareno; Anahí Suárez
World Athletics Rankings	1	Netherlands	~~Femke Bol~~; ~~Marije van Hunenstijn~~; Tasa Jiya
World Athletics Rankings	2	Australia	Torrie Lewis; Mia Gross
World Athletics Rankings	2	Italy	Dalia Kaddari; Anna Bongiorni
World Athletics Rankings	1	Spain	Jaël Bestué; ~~Paula Sevilla~~
World Athletics Rankings	2	Sweden	Julia Henriksson; Nora Lindahl
World Athletics Rankings	1	Brazil	Ana Azevedo
World Athletics Rankings	1	Canada	Jacqueline Madogo
World Athletics Rankings	1	China	Li Yuting
World Athletics Rankings	1	Cyprus	Olivia Fotopoulou
World Athletics Rankings	1	Denmark	Ida Karstoft
World Athletics Rankings	1	France	Helene Parisot
World Athletics Rankings	1	Greece	Polyniki Emmanouilidou
World Athletics Rankings	1	Hungary	Boglárka Takács
World Athletics Rankings	1	Mexico	Cecilia Tamayo-Garza
World Athletics Rankings	0	~~Norway~~	~~Henriette Jæger~~
World Athletics Rankings	1	Poland	Martyna Kotwiła
World Athletics Rankings	1	Switzerland	Léonie Pointet
Reallocation of rejected quotas	1	Belgium	Imke Vervaet
Reallocation of rejected quotas	1	Brazil	Lorraine Martins
Reallocation of rejected quotas	1	British Virgin Islands	Adaejah Hodge
Reallocation of rejected quotas	1	The Gambia	Gina Mariam Bass Bittaye
Reallocation of rejected quotas	1	Kazakhstan	Olga Safronova
Reallocation of rejected quotas	1	Poland	Krystsina Tsimanouskaya
Reallocation of rejected quotas	1	Portugal	Lorène Dorcas Bazolo
Total	48		

==== Women's 400 m ====
Qualification standard	No. of athletes	NOC	Nominated athletes
Entry standard – 50.95	3	Great Britain	Amber Anning; Laviai Nielsen; Victoria Ohuruogu
Entry standard – 50.95	3	Jamaica	Junelle Bromfield; Nickisha Pryce; Stacey-Ann Williams
Entry standard – 50.95	3	United States	Aaliyah Butler; Kendall Ellis; Alexis Holmes
Entry standard – 50.95	1	Bahrain	~~Kemi Adekoya~~; Salwa Eid Naser
Entry standard – 50.95	1	Belgium	Cynthia Bolingo; ~~Naomi Van den Broeck~~
Entry standard – 50.95	2	Canada	Lauren Gale; Zoe Sherar
Entry standard – 50.95	2	Czech Republic	Lurdes Gloria Manuel; Lada Vondrová
Entry standard – 50.95	2	Ireland	Rhasidat Adeleke; Sharlene Mawdsley
Entry standard – 50.95	1	Netherlands	~~Femke Bol~~; Lieke Klaver
Entry standard – 50.95	1	Austria	Susanne Gogl-Walli
Entry standard – 50.95	1	Barbados	Sada Williams
Entry standard – 50.95	1	Colombia	Lina Licona
Entry standard – 50.95	1	Cuba	Roxana Gómez
Entry standard – 50.95	1	Dominican Republic	Marileidy Paulino
Entry standard – 50.95	1	India	Kiran Pahal
Entry standard – 50.95	0	~~Kenya~~	~~Mary Moraa~~
Entry standard – 50.95	1	Latvia	Gunta Vaičule
Entry standard – 50.95	1	Mexico	Paola Morán
Entry standard – 50.95	1	Nigeria	Ella Onojuvwevwo
Entry standard – 50.95	1	Norway	Henriette Jæger
Entry standard – 50.95	1	Poland	Natalia Kaczmarek
Entry standard – 50.95	1	Romania	Andrea Miklós
Entry standard – 50.95	0	~~Saint Vincent and the Grenadines~~	~~Shafiqua Maloney~~
Entry standard – 50.95	1	South Africa	Miranda Coetzee
World Athletics Rankings	1	Australia	Ellie Beer
World Athletics Rankings	1	Bahamas	Shaunae Miller-Uibo
World Athletics Rankings	1	Belgium	Helena Ponette
World Athletics Rankings	1	Chile	Martina Weil
World Athletics Rankings	1	Colombia	Evelis Aguilar
World Athletics Rankings	1	Czech Republic	Tereza Petržilková
World Athletics Rankings	1	Ecuador	Nicole Caicedo
World Athletics Rankings	0	~~France~~	~~Amandine Brossier~~
World Athletics Rankings	1	Guyana	Aliyah Abrams
World Athletics Rankings	1	Nigeria	Esther Joseph
World Athletics Rankings	1	Portugal	Cátia Azevedo
World Athletics Rankings	1	Puerto Rico	Gabby Scott
Reallocation of rejected quotas	2	Poland	Justyna Święty-Ersetic; Marika Popowicz-Drapała
Reallocation of rejected quotas	1	Brazil	Tiffani Marinho
Reallocation of rejected quotas	1	Ireland	Sophie Becker
Reallocation of rejected quotas	1	Italy	Alice Mangione
Reallocation of rejected quotas	1	Lithuania	Modesta Justė Morauskaitė
Total	49		

==== Women's 800 m ====
Qualification standard	No. of athletes	NOC	Nominated athletes
Entry standard – 1:59.30	3	Australia	Catriona Bisset; Abbey Caldwell; Claudia Hollingsworth
Entry standard – 1:59.30	3	Ethiopia	Habitam Alemu; Tsige Duguma; Worknesh Mesele
Entry standard – 1:59.30	3	Great Britain	Phoebe Gill; Keely Hodgkinson; Jemma Reekie
Entry standard – 1:59.30	3	Kenya	Vivian Chebet Kiprotich; Mary Moraa; Lilian Odira
Entry standard – 1:59.30	3	Switzerland	Rachel Pellaud; Valentina Rosamilia; Audrey Werro
Entry standard – 1:59.30	3	United States	Nia Akins; Allie Wilson; Juliette Whittaker
Entry standard – 1:59.30	2	Cuba	Rose Mary Almanza; Daily Cooper Gaspar
Entry standard – 1:59.30	2	France	Rénelle Lamote; Anaïs Bourgoin
Entry standard – 1:59.30	2	Jamaica	Natoya Goule-Toppin; Adelle Tracey
Entry standard – 1:59.30	1	Bahrain	Nelly Jepkosgei
Entry standard – 1:59.30	1	Benin	Noélie Yarigo
Entry standard – 1:59.30	1	Canada	Jazz Shukla
Entry standard – 1:59.30	1	The Gambia	Sanu Jallow
Entry standard – 1:59.30	1	Germany	Majtie Kolberg
Entry standard – 1:59.30	0	~~Ireland~~	~~Ciara Mageean~~
Entry standard – 1:59.30	1	Italy	Elena Bellò
Entry standard – 1:59.30	1	Poland	Anna Wielgosz
Entry standard – 1:59.30	1	Saint Vincent and the Grenadines	Shafiqua Maloney
Entry standard – 1:59.30	1	Slovakia	Gabriela Gajanová
Entry standard – 1:59.30	1	Slovenia	Anita Horvat
Entry standard – 1:59.30	1	South Africa	Prudence Sekgodiso
Entry standard – 1:59.30	1	Uganda	Halimah Nakaayi
World Athletics Rankings	1	Botswana	Oratile Nowe
World Athletics Rankings	1	Brazil	Flávia de Lima
World Athletics Rankings	1	Finland	Eveliina Määttänen
World Athletics Rankings	1	France	Léna Kandissounon
World Athletics Rankings	1	Italy	Eloisa Coiro
World Athletics Rankings	1	Lithuania	Gabija Galvydytė
World Athletics Rankings	1	Morocco	Assia Raziki
World Athletics Rankings	1	Spain	Lorea Ibarzabal
World Athletics Rankings	1	Sri Lanka	Tharushi Karunarathna
Reallocation of rejected quotas	1	Spain	Lorena Martín
Universality places	1	Kosovo	Gresa Bakraçi
Universality places	1	Kuwait	Amal Al-Roumi
Universality places	1	Palestine	Layla Almasri
Invitational Places	1	Refugee Olympic Team	Perina Lokure Nakang
Total	50		

==== Women's 1500 m ====
Note: The qualifying standards also include achievements in the mile run (4:20.90).

Qualification standard	No. of athletes	NOC	Nominated athletes
Entry standard – 4:02.50	3	Australia	Georgia Griffith; Linden Hall; Jessica Hull
Entry standard – 4:02.50	3	Ethiopia	Birke Haylom; Gudaf Tsegay; Diribe Welteji
Entry standard – 4:02.50	3	Great Britain	Georgia Bell; Laura Muir; Revée Walcott-Nolan
Entry standard – 4:02.50	3	Ireland	Ciara Mageean; Sophie O'Sullivan; Sarah Healy
Entry standard – 4:02.50	3	Kenya	Nelly Chepchirchir; Susan Ejore; Faith Kipyegon
Entry standard – 4:02.50	3	United States	Nikki Hiltz; Emily Mackay; Elle St. Pierre
Entry standard – 4:02.50	2	Italy	Ludovica Cavalli; Sintayehu Vissa
Entry standard – 4:02.50	2	Spain	Marta Pérez; Esther Guerrero
Entry standard – 4:02.50	1	Canada	Lucia Stafford
Entry standard – 4:02.50	1	France	Agathe Guillemot
Entry standard – 4:02.50	0	~~Germany~~	~~Katharina Trost~~
Entry standard – 4:02.50	1	Jamaica	Adelle Tracey
Entry standard – 4:02.50	1	Japan	Nozomi Tanaka
Entry standard – 4:02.50	0	Netherlands	~~Sifan Hassan~~
Entry standard – 4:02.50	1	Poland	Klaudia Kazimierska
Entry standard – 4:02.50	1	Uganda	Winnie Nanyondo
World Athletics Rankings	1	Finland	~~Nathalie Blomqvist~~; Sara Lappalainen
World Athletics Rankings	2	Poland	Weronika Lizakowska; Aleksandra Płocińska
World Athletics Rankings	1	Belgium	Elise Vanderelst
World Athletics Rankings	1	Canada	Simone Plourde
World Athletics Rankings	1	Czech Republic	Kristiina Sasínek Mäki
World Athletics Rankings	0	~~France~~	~~Berenice Cleyet-Merle~~
World Athletics Rankings	1	Italy	Federica del Buono
World Athletics Rankings	1	Luxembourg	Vera Hoffmann
World Athletics Rankings	1	New Zealand	Maia Ramsden
World Athletics Rankings	1	Portugal	Salomé Afonso
World Athletics Rankings	1	Spain	Águeda Marqués
World Athletics Rankings	0	~~Sweden~~	~~Yolanda Ngarambe~~
World Athletics Rankings	1	Venezuela	Joselyn Brea
Reallocation of rejected quotas	1	Canada	Kate Current
Reallocation of rejected quotas	1	Germany	Nele Weßel
Reallocation of rejected quotas	1	Japan	Yume Goto
Reallocation of rejected quotas	1	Uruguay	María Pía Fernández
Invitational Places	1	Refugee Olympic Team	Farida Abaroge
Total	45		

==== Women's 5000 m ====
Qualification standard	No. of athletes	NOC	Nominated athletes
Entry standard – 14:52.00	3	Ethiopia	Medina Eisa; Ejgayehu Taye; Gudaf Tsegay
Entry standard – 14:52.00	3	Kenya	Beatrice Chebet; Margaret Kipkemboi; Faith Kipyegon
Entry standard – 14:52.00	2	Australia	Isobel Batt-Doyle; Rose Davies
Entry standard – 14:52.00	0	~~Great Britain~~	~~Megan Keith~~; ~~Jessica Warner-Judd~~
Entry standard – 14:52.00	2	Netherlands	Sifan Hassan; Maureen Koster
Entry standard – 14:52.00	2	United States	Elise Cranny; Karissa Schweizer
Entry standard – 14:52.00	1	Uganda	~~Sarah Chelangat~~; Joy Cheptoyek
Entry standard – 14:52.00	0	~~Bahrain~~	~~Winfred Yavi~~
Entry standard – 14:52.00	1	Burundi	Francine Niyomukunzi
Entry standard – 14:52.00	1	Djibouti	Samiyah Hassan Nour
Entry standard – 14:52.00	1	Finland	Nathalie Blomqvist
Entry standard – 14:52.00	1	Italy	Nadia Battocletti
Entry standard – 14:52.00	1	Japan	Nozomi Tanaka
Entry standard – 14:52.00	1	Mexico	Laura Galván
Entry standard – 14:52.00	1	Norway	Karoline Bjerkeli Grøvdal
Entry standard – 14:52.00	1	Spain	Marta García
Entry standard – 14:52.00	1	Venezuela	Joselyn Brea
World Athletics Rankings	0	~~Great Britain~~	~~Hannah Nuttall~~
World Athletics Rankings	1	Australia	Lauren Ryan
World Athletics Rankings	1	Belgium	Lisa Rooms
World Athletics Rankings	1	Canada	Regan Yee
World Athletics Rankings	0	~~Finland~~	~~Camilla Richardsson~~
World Athletics Rankings	1	France	Sarah Madeleine
World Athletics Rankings	1	Germany	Hanna Klein
World Athletics Rankings	1	India	Parul Chaudhary
World Athletics Rankings	1	Italy	Federica del Buono
World Athletics Rankings	1	Japan	Yuma Yamamoto
World Athletics Rankings	1	Latvia	Agate Caune
World Athletics Rankings	1	Portugal	Mariana Machado
World Athletics Rankings	1	Slovenia	Klara Lukan
World Athletics Rankings	0	Sweden	~~Sarah Lahti~~
World Athletics Rankings	1	Uganda	Esther Chebet
World Athletics Rankings	1	United States	Whittni Morgan
Reallocation of rejected quotas	1	Canada	Briana Scott
Reallocation of rejected quotas	1	Hungary	Viktória Wagner-Gyürkés
Reallocation of rejected quotas	1	India	Ankita Dhyani
Reallocation of rejected quotas	1	Ireland	Jodie McCann
Reallocation of rejected quotas	1	Japan	Wakana Kabasawa
Reallocation of rejected quotas	1	Mexico	Alma Delia Cortés
Reallocation of rejected quotas	1	Uganda	Belinda Chemutai
Total	42		

==== Women's 10,000 m ====
Qualification standard	No. of athletes	NOC	Nominated athletes
Entry standard – 30:40.00	3	Ethiopia	Tsigie Gebreselama; Fotyen Tesfay; Gudaf Tsegay
Entry standard – 30:40.00	3	Kenya	Beatrice Chebet; Lilian Kasait Rengeruk; Margaret Kipkemboi
Entry standard – 30:40.00	2	Great Britain	Megan Keith; Eilish McColgan
Entry standard – 30:40.00	2	Netherlands	Diane van Es; Sifan Hassan
Entry standard – 30:40.00	2	Uganda	Sarah Chelangat; Joy Cheptoyek
Entry standard – 30:40.00	1	United States	Weini Kelati; ~~Alicia Monson~~
Entry standard – 30:40.00	1	Australia	Lauren Ryan
Cross Country Rankings	1	Burundi	Francine Niyomukunzi
Cross Country Rankings	1	Eritrea	Rahel Daniel
Cross Country Rankings	1	France	Alessia Zarbo
Cross Country Rankings	1	Italy	Nadia Battocletti
Cross Country Rankings	0	~~Netherlands~~	~~Veerle Bakker~~
Cross Country Rankings	0	~~Sweden~~	~~Sarah Lahti~~
Cross Country Rankings	1	Uganda	Annet Chemengich Chelangat
Cross Country Rankings	0	~~United States~~	~~Katie Izzo~~
World Athletics Rankings	2	Japan	Rino Goshima; ~~Ririka Hironaka~~; Haruka Kokai
World Athletics Rankings	0	~~Great Britain~~	~~Jessica Warner-Judd~~
Reallocation of rejected quotas	2	United States	Karissa Schweizer; Parker Valby
Reallocation of rejected quotas	1	Japan	Yuka Takashima
Reallocation of rejected quotas	1	Kazakhstan	Daisy Jepkemei
Reallocation of rejected quotas	1	Slovenia	Klara Lukan
Total	26		

==== Women's 100 m hurdles ====
Note: The qualifying standards exclude indoor achievements or races with wind above 2.0 m/s.

Qualification standard	No. of athletes	NOC	Nominated athletes
Entry standard – 12.77	3	United States	Alaysha Johnson; Masai Russell; Grace Stark
Entry standard – 12.77	3	Jamaica	Janeek Brown; Ackera Nugent; Danielle Williams
Entry standard – 12.77	3	Bahamas	Devynne Charlton; Denisha Cartwright; Charisma Taylor
Entry standard – 12.77	2	China	Wu Yanni; Lin Yuwei
Entry standard – 12.77	2	Finland	Lotta Harala; Reetta Hurske
Entry standard – 12.77	2	France	Laëticia Bapté; Cyréna Samba-Mayela
Entry standard – 12.77	2	Netherlands	Maayke Tjin-A-Lim; Nadine Visser
Entry standard – 12.77	1	Australia	Michelle Jenneke
Entry standard – 12.77	1	Canada	Mariam Abdul-Rashid
Entry standard – 12.77	1	Ecuador	Maribel Caicedo
Entry standard – 12.77	1	Haiti	Emelia Chatfield
Entry standard – 12.77	1	Hungary	Luca Kozák
Entry standard – 12.77	1	Great Britain	Cindy Sember
Entry standard – 12.77	1	Ireland	Sarah Lavin
Entry standard – 12.77	1	Japan	Mako Fukube
Entry standard – 12.77	1	Liberia	Ebony Morrison
Entry standard – 12.77	1	Nigeria	Tobi Amusan
Entry standard – 12.77	1	Poland	Pia Skrzyszowska
Entry standard – 12.77	1	Puerto Rico	Jasmine Camacho-Quinn
Entry standard – 12.77	1	Slovakia	Viktória Forster
Entry standard – 12.77	1	South Africa	Marione Fourie
Entry standard – 12.77	1	Switzerland	Ditaji Kambundji
Entry standard – 12.77	1	Venezuela	Yoveinny Mota
World Athletics Rankings	2	Australia	Liz Clay; Celeste Mucci
World Athletics Rankings	1	Canada	Michelle Harrison
World Athletics Rankings	1	Hungary	Gréta Kerekes
World Athletics Rankings	1	India	Jyothi Yarraji
World Athletics Rankings	1	Japan	Yumi Tanaka
World Athletics Rankings	1	Madagascar	Sidonie Fiadanantsoa
Reallocation of rejected quotas			
Total	40		

==== Women's 400 m hurdles ====
Qualification standard	No. of athletes	NOC	Nominated athletes
Entry standard – 54.85	3	Italy	Ayomide Folorunso; Alice Muraro; Rebecca Sartori
Entry standard – 54.85	3	Jamaica	Rushell Clayton; Janieve Russell; Shiann Salmon
Entry standard – 54.85	3	United States	Anna Cockrell; Jasmine Jones; Sydney McLaughlin-Levrone
Entry standard – 54.85	2	Belgium	Hanne Claes; Naomi Van den Broeck
Entry standard – 54.85	2	France	Shana Grebo; Louise Maraval
Entry standard – 54.85	2	Great Britain	Jessie Knight; Lina Nielsen
Entry standard – 54.85	2	Netherlands	Femke Bol; Cathelijn Peeters
Entry standard – 54.85	2	South Africa	Zenéy Geldenhuys; Rogail Joseph
Entry standard – 54.85	2	Ukraine	Anna Ryzhykova; Viktoriya Tkachuk
Entry standard – 54.85	1	Bahrain	Kemi Adekoya
Entry standard – 54.85	1	Canada	Savannah Sutherland
Entry standard – 54.85	1	China	Mo Jiadie
Entry standard – 54.85	1	Czech Republic	Nikoleta Jíchová
Entry standard – 54.85	1	Finland	Viivi Lehikoinen
Entry standard – 54.85	1	Germany	Carolina Krafzik
Entry standard – 54.85	1	Morocco	Noura Ennadi
Entry standard – 54.85	1	Norway	Line Kloster
Entry standard – 54.85	1	Panama	Gianna Woodruff
Entry standard – 54.85	1	Portugal	Fatoumata Diallo
Entry standard – 54.85	1	Switzerland	Yasmin Giger
World Athletics Rankings	2	Australia	Sarah Carli; Alanah Yukich
World Athletics Rankings	1	Belgium	Paulien Couckuyt
World Athletics Rankings	1	Brazil	Chayenne da Silva
World Athletics Rankings	1	Cameroon	Linda Angounou
World Athletics Rankings	1	Norway	Amalie Iuel
World Athletics Rankings	1	Philippines	Lauren Hoffman
World Athletics Rankings	1	Puerto Rico	Grace Claxton
Reallocation of rejected quotas			
Total	40		

==== Women's 3000 m steeplechase ====
Qualification standard	No. of athletes	NOC	Nominated athletes
Entry standard – 9:23.00
Entry standard – 9:23.00	3	Germany	Olivia Gürth; Gesa Krause; Lea Meyer
Entry standard – 9:23.00	3	Kenya	Beatrice Chepkoech; Jackline Chepkoech; Faith Cherotich
Entry standard – 9:23.00	3	United States	Valerie Constien; Marisa Howard; Courtney Wayment
Entry standard – 9:23.00	2	Ethiopia	Sembo Almayew; Lomi Muleta
Entry standard – 9:23.00	2	France	Alice Finot; Flavie Renouard
Entry standard – 9:23.00	2	Great Britain	Elizabeth Bird; Aimee Pratt
Entry standard – 9:23.00	2	Spain	Carolina Robles; Irene Sánchez-Escribano
Entry standard – 9:23.00	1	Albania	Luiza Gega
Entry standard – 9:23.00	1	Bahrain	Winfred Yavi
Entry standard – 9:23.00	1	Canada	Ceili McCabe
Entry standard – 9:23.00	1	India	Parul Chaudhary
Entry standard – 9:23.00	1	Kazakhstan	Norah Jeruto
Entry standard – 9:23.00	1	Poland	Alicja Konieczek
Entry standard – 9:23.00	0	~~Slovenia~~	~~Maruša Mišmaš-Zrimšek~~
Entry standard – 9:23.00	1	Tunisia	Marwa Bouzayani
Entry standard – 9:23.00	1	Uganda	Peruth Chemutai
Entry standard – 9:23.00	1	Romania	Stella Rutto
World Athletics Rankings	2	Australia	Amy Cashin; Cara Feain-Ryan
World Athletics Rankings	1	Argentina	Belén Casetta
World Athletics Rankings	1	Brazil	Tatiane Raquel da Silva
World Athletics Rankings	1	Canada	Regan Yee
World Athletics Rankings	1	China	Xu Shuangshuang
World Athletics Rankings	0	Ethiopia	~~Frehiwot Gesese~~
World Athletics Rankings	1	Kazakhstan	Daisy Jepkemei
World Athletics Rankings	1	Poland	Aneta Konieczek
Reallocation of rejected quotas	1	Finland	Ilona Mononen
Reallocation of rejected quotas	1	Poland	Kinga Królik
Total	36		

== Road events ==
=== Men's road events ===
==== Men's marathon ====
Qualification standard	No. of athletes	NOC	Nominated athletes
Entry standard – 2:08:10	3	Belgium	Bashir Abdi; Koen Naert; Michael Somers
Entry standard – 2:08:10	3	China	He Jie (runner); Wu Xiangdong; Yang Shaohui
Entry standard – 2:08:10	3	Eritrea	Samsom Amare; Berhane Tesfay; Henok Tesfay
Entry standard – 2:08:10	3	Ethiopia	Kenenisa Bekele; Deresa Geleta; Tamirat Tola
Entry standard – 2:08:10	3	France	Morhad Amdouni; Felix Bour; Nicolas Navarro
Entry standard – 2:08:10	3	Germany	Samuel Fitwi; Amanal Petros; Richard Ringer
Entry standard – 2:08:10	3	Great Britain	Emile Cairess; Mahamed Mahamed; Philip Sesemann
Entry standard – 2:08:10	3	Israel	Maru Teferi; Gashau Ayale; Girmaw Amare
Entry standard – 2:08:10	3	Italy	Yemaneberhan Crippa; Eyob Faniel; Daniele Meucci
Entry standard – 2:08:10	3	Kenya	Eliud Kipchoge; Benson Kipruto; Alexander Mutiso
Entry standard – 2:08:10	3	Morocco	Othmane El Goumri; Mohcin Outalha; Zouhair Talbi
Entry standard – 2:08:10	3	Spain	Ibrahim Chakir; Tariku Novales; Yago Rojo
Entry standard – 2:08:10	3	Uganda	Victor Kiplangat; Stephen Kissa; Andrew Rotich Kwemoi
Entry standard – 2:08:10	2	Australia	Andrew Buchanan (Note: Qualified by quota place reallocation.); Patrick Tiernan
Entry standard – 2:08:10	2	Canada	Cameron Levins; Rory Linkletter
Entry standard – 2:08:10	2	Japan	Naoki Koyama; Suguru Osako
Entry standard – 2:08:10	2	Netherlands	Khalid Choukoud; Abdi Nageeye
Entry standard – 2:08:10	2	Norway	Zerei Kbrom Mezngi; Sondre Nordstad Moen
Entry standard – 2:08:10	2	Switzerland	Tadesse Abraham; Matthias Kyburz
Entry standard – 2:08:10	2	Tanzania	Gabriel Geay; Alphonce Simbu
Entry standard – 2:08:10	2	United States	Conner Mantz; Clayton Young
Entry standard – 2:08:10	0	Bahrain	~~Marius Kimutai~~ (Note: Currently serving a 3 year ban for a doping adverse result. Quota place can be reallocated to another athlete by the NOC, provided that the athlete has achieved a time of at least 2:11:30 during the qualification period.)
Entry standard – 2:08:10	1	Bolivia	Héctor Garibay
Entry standard – 2:08:10	0	Brazil	~~Daniel Ferreira do Nascimento~~ (Note: Currently provisionally suspended for a doping adverse result. Quota place can be reallocated to another athlete by the NOC, provided that the athlete has achieved a time of at least 2:11:30 during the qualification period.)
Entry standard – 2:08:10	1	Chile	Carlos Díaz
Entry standard – 2:08:10	1	Djibouti	Bouh Ibrahim
Entry standard – 2:08:10	1	Guatemala	Alberto González Mindez
Entry standard – 2:08:10	1	Lesotho	Tebello Ramakongoana
Entry standard – 2:08:10	1	Peru	Cristhian Pacheco
Entry standard – 2:08:10	1	Portugal	Samuel Barata
Entry standard – 2:08:10	1	South Africa	Stephen Mokoka
Entry standard – 2:08:10	1	Sweden	Suldan Hassan
Entry standard – 2:08:10	1	Turkey	Kaan Kigen Özbilen
Entry standard – 2:08:10	1	Uzbekistan	Shokhrukh Davlatov
Entry standard – 2:08:10	1	Zimbabwe	Isaac Mpofu
World Athletics Rankings	1	Australia	Liam Adams
World Athletics Rankings	1	Chile	Hugo Catrileo
World Athletics Rankings	1	Japan	Akira Akasaki
World Athletics Rankings	1	South Africa	Elroy Gelant
World Athletics Rankings	1	United States	Leonard Korir
Universality Places	1	Cape Verde	Samuel Freire
Universality Places	1	Chad	Valentin Betoudji
Universality Places	1	Jordan	Mo'ath Alkhawaldeh
Universality Places	1	Mongolia	Bat-Ochiryn Ser-Od
Universality Places	1	North Korea	Han Il-ryong
Universality Places	1	North Macedonia	Dario Ivanovski
Universality Places	1	Sudan	Yaseen Abdalla
Universality Places	1	Virgin Islands	Eduardo Garcia
Invitational places	1	Refugee Olympic Team	Tachlowini Gabriyesos
Total	81		

==== Men's 20 km walk ====
Qualification standard	No. of athletes	NOC	Nominated athletes
Entry standard – 1:20:10	3	Australia	Declan Tingay; Kyle Swan; Rhydian Cowley
Entry standard – 1:20:10	3	China	Li Yandong; Wang Zhaozhao; Zhang Jun
Entry standard – 1:20:10	3	Ecuador	David Hurtado; Brian Pintado; Jordy Jiménez
Entry standard – 1:20:10	3	India	Paramjeet Singh Bisht; Akshdeep Singh; Vikash Singh
Entry standard – 1:20:10	3	Japan	Ryo Hamanishi; Koki Ikeda; Yuta Koga
Entry standard – 1:20:10	3	Mexico	Noel Chama; José Luis Doctor; Ricardo Ortiz
Entry standard – 1:20:10	3	Spain	Diego García; Álvaro Martín; Paul McGrath
Entry standard – 1:20:10	2	France	Aurélien Quinion; Gabriel Bordier
Entry standard – 1:20:10	2	Italy	Francesco Fortunato; Massimo Stano
Entry standard – 1:20:10	1	Brazil	Caio Bonfim
Entry standard – 1:20:10	1	Canada	Evan Dunfee
Entry standard – 1:20:10	0	~~Colombia~~	~~Éider Arévalo~~
Entry standard – 1:20:10	1	Finland	Aku Partanen
Entry standard – 1:20:10	1	Germany	Christopher Linke
Entry standard – 1:20:10	1	Guatemala	José Alejandro Barrondo
Entry standard – 1:20:10	1	Kenya	Samuel Gathimba
Entry standard – 1:20:10	1	Peru	César Rodríguez
Entry standard – 1:20:10	1	Poland	Maher Ben Hlima
Entry standard – 1:20:10	1	Sweden	Perseus Karlström
Entry standard – 1:20:10	1	Turkey	Salih Korkmaz
World Athletics Rankings	1	Brazil	Matheus Correa
World Athletics Rankings	1	Germany	Leo Köpp
World Athletics Rankings	1	Great Britain	Callum Wilkinson
World Athletics Rankings	1	Guatemala	Érick Barrondo
World Athletics Rankings	1	Hungary	Máté Helebrandt
World Athletics Rankings	1	Italy	Riccardo Orsoni
World Athletics Rankings	1	Peru	Luis Henry Campos
World Athletics Rankings	1	Poland	Artur Brzozowski
World Athletics Rankings	1	Slovakia	Dominik Černý
World Athletics Rankings	1	South Korea	Byeong-kwang Choe
World Athletics Rankings	1	Ukraine	Ihor Hlavan
Reallocation of rejected quotas	1	Ethiopia	Wakuma Misgana
Reallocation of rejected quotas	1	Hungary	Bence Venyercsán
Reallocation of rejected quotas	1	Brazil	Max Batista Gonçalves dos Santos
Total	49		

=== Women's road events ===
==== Women's marathon ====
Qualification standard	No. of athletes	NOC	Nominated athletes
Entry standard – 2:26:50	3	Australia	Sinead Diver; Genevieve Gregson; Jessica Stenson
Entry standard – 2:26:50	3	Bahrain	Rose Chelimo; Eunice Chumba; Tigist Gashaw
Entry standard – 2:26:50	3	China	Bai Li; Xia Yuyu; Zhang Deshun
Entry standard – 2:26:50	3	Ecuador	Rosa Chacha; Mary Granja; Silvia Ortiz
Entry standard – 2:26:50	3	Ethiopia	Alemu Megertu; Tigst Assefa; Amane Beriso Shankule
Entry standard – 2:26:50	3	France	Mélody Julien; Méline Rollin; Mekdes Woldu
Entry standard – 2:26:50	3	Germany	Laura Hottenrott; Melat Yisak Kejeta; Domenika Mayer
Entry standard – 2:26:50	3	Great Britain	Rose Harvey; Calli Hauger-Thackery; Charlotte Purdue
Entry standard – 2:26:50	3	Japan	Honami Maeda; Mao Ichiyama; Yuka Suzuki
Entry standard – 2:26:50	3	Kenya	Peres Jepchirchir; Sharon Lokedi; Hellen Obiri
Entry standard – 2:26:50	3	Morocco	Kaoutar Farkoussi; Fatima Ezzahra Gardadi; Rahma Tahiri
Entry standard – 2:26:50	3	Peru	Luz Mery Rojas; Gladys Tejeda; Thalia Valdivia
Entry standard – 2:26:50	3	South Africa	Cian Oldknow; Gerda Steyn; Irvette van Zyl
Entry standard – 2:26:50	3	Spain	Majida Maayouf; Esther Navarrete; Meritxell Soler
Entry standard – 2:26:50	3	Uganda	Mercyline Chelangat; Rebecca Cheptegei; Stella Chesang
Entry standard – 2:26:50	3	United States	Dakotah Lindwurm; Fiona O'Keeffe; Emily Sisson
Entry standard – 2:26:50	2	Argentina	Florencia Borelli; Daiana Ocampo
Entry standard – 2:26:50	2	Belgium	Chloé Herbiet; Hanne Verbruggen
Entry standard – 2:26:50	2	Croatia	Bojana Bjeljac; Matea Parlov Koštro
Entry standard – 2:26:50	2	Czech Republic	Tereza Hrochová; Moira Stewartová
Entry standard – 2:26:50	1	Eritrea	Dolshi Tesfu; ~~Nazret Weldu~~ (Note: Currently provisionally suspended for whereabouts failures.)
Entry standard – 2:26:50	2	Israel	Lonah Chemtai Salpeter; Maor Tiyouri
Entry standard – 2:26:50	2	Italy	Giovanna Epis; Sofiia Yaremchuk
Entry standard – 2:26:50	2	Mexico	Margarita Hernández; Citlali Cristian
Entry standard – 2:26:50	2	Mongolia	Bayartsogtyn Mönkhzayaa; Galbadrakhyn Khishigsaikhan
Entry standard – 2:26:50	2	Netherlands	Sifan Hassan; Anne Luijten
Entry standard – 2:26:50	2	Poland	Aleksandra Lisowska; Angelika Mach
Entry standard – 2:26:50	2	Romania	Joan Chelimo; Delvine Relin Meringor
Entry standard – 2:26:50	2	Switzerland	Helen Bekele Tola; Fabienne Schlumpf
Entry standard – 2:26:50	2	Tanzania	Jackline Sakilu; Magdalena Shauri
Entry standard – 2:26:50	1	Austria	Julia Mayer
Entry standard – 2:26:50	1	Canada	Malindi Elmore
Entry standard – 2:26:50	1	Colombia	Angie Orjuela
Entry standard – 2:26:50	1	Finland	Camilla Richardsson
Entry standard – 2:26:50	1	Ireland	Fionnuala McCormack
Entry standard – 2:26:50	1	Kazakhstan	Zhanna Mamazhanova
Entry standard – 2:26:50	1	Mauritius	Marie Perrier
Entry standard – 2:26:50	1	New Zealand	Camille French
Entry standard – 2:26:50	1	Portugal	Susana Godinho
Entry standard – 2:26:50	1	Rwanda	Clementine Mukandanga
Entry standard – 2:26:50	1	Sweden	Carolina Wikström
Entry standard – 2:26:50	0	~~Turkey~~	~~Sultan Haydar~~ (Note: Currently provisionally suspended for evading, refusing, or failing to submit to sample collection.)
World Athletics Rankings	0		
Universality Places	1	Bhutan	Kinzang Lhamo
Universality Places	1	Kyrgyzstan	Sardana Trofimova
Universality Places	1	Lesotho	Mokulubete Makatisi
Universality Places	1	Namibia	Helalia Johannes
Universality Places	1	Nepal	Santoshi Shrestha
Universality Places	1	Zimbabwe	Rutendo Nyahora
Total	94		

==== Women's 20 km walk ====
Qualification standard	No. of athletes	NOC	Nominated athletes
Entry standard – 1:29:20	3	Australia	Jemima Montag; Rebecca Henderson; Olivia Sandery
Entry standard – 1:29:20	3	China	Liu Hong; Ma Zhenxia; Yang Jiayu
Entry standard – 1:29:20	3	France	Clémence Beretta; Camille Moutard; Pauline Stey
Entry standard – 1:29:20	3	Italy	Eleonora Giorgi; Antonella Palmisano; Valentina Trapletti
Entry standard – 1:29:20	3	Peru	Kimberly García; Evelyn Inga; Mary Luz Andía
Entry standard – 1:29:20	3	Spain	Laura García-Caro; María Pérez; Cristina Montesinos
Entry standard – 1:29:20	3	Ukraine	Lyudmyla Olyanovska; Mariia Sakharuk; Olena Sobchuk
Entry standard – 1:29:20	2	Brazil	Érica de Sena; Viviane Lyra
Entry standard – 1:29:20	2	Ecuador	Glenda Morejón; Magaly Bonilla
Entry standard – 1:29:20	1	Japan	Nanako Fujii; ~~Kumiko Okada~~
Entry standard – 1:29:20	1	Colombia	Sandra Arenas
Entry standard – 1:29:20	1	Germany	Saskia Feige
Entry standard – 1:29:20	1	Greece	Antigoni Drisbioti
Entry standard – 1:29:20	1	India	Priyanka Goswami
Entry standard – 1:29:20	1	Mexico	Alegna González
Entry standard – 1:29:20	1	Portugal	Ana Cabecinha
World Athletics Rankings	2	Hungary	Viktória Madarász; Rita Récsei
World Athletics Rankings	2	Mexico	Ilse Guerrero; Alejandra Ortega
World Athletics Rankings	2	Slovakia	Hana Burzalová; Mária Czaková
World Athletics Rankings	1	Brazil	Gabriela de Sousa
World Athletics Rankings	1	Czech Republic	Eliška Martínková
World Athletics Rankings	1	Ecuador	Paula Milena Torres
World Athletics Rankings	0	~~Greece~~	~~Kiriaki Filtisakou~~
World Athletics Rankings	0	~~Japan~~	~~Ayane Yanai~~
World Athletics Rankings	1	Poland	Katarzyna Zdziebło
World Athletics Rankings	1	Portugal	Vitória Oliveira
World Athletics Rankings	1	Puerto Rico	Rachelle de Orbeta
World Athletics Rankings	1	Turkey	Meryem Bekmez
Total	45		

== Field events ==
=== Men's field events ===
==== Men's high jump ====
Qualification standard	No. of athletes	NOC	Nominated athletes
Entry standard – 2.33	2	United States	JuVaughn Harrison; Shelby McEwen
Entry standard – 2.33	1	Cuba	Luis Zayas
Entry standard – 2.33	1	Germany	Tobias Potye
Entry standard – 2.33	1	Italy	Gianmarco Tamberi
Entry standard – 2.33	1	New Zealand	Hamish Kerr
Entry standard – 2.33	1	Poland	~~Norbert Kobielski~~ (Note: Currently provisionally suspended for a doping adverse result.)
Entry standard – 2.33	1	Qatar	Mutaz Essa Barshim
Entry standard – 2.33	1	South Korea	Woo Sang-hyeok
World Athletics Rankings	3	Australia	Joel Baden; Yual Reath; Brandon Starc
World Athletics Rankings	3	Ukraine	Oleh Doroshchuk; Vladyslav Lavskyy; Andrii Protsenko
World Athletics Rankings	2	Japan	Ryoichi Akamatsu; Tomohiro Shinno
World Athletics Rankings	2	Mexico	Erick Portillo; Edgar Rivera
World Athletics Rankings	1	Bahamas	Donald Thomas
World Athletics Rankings	1	Belgium	Thomas Carmoy
World Athletics Rankings	1	Brazil	Fernando Ferreira
World Athletics Rankings	1	Bulgaria	Tihomir Ivanov
World Athletics Rankings	1	China	Wang Zhen
World Athletics Rankings	1	Czech Republic	Jan Štefela
World Athletics Rankings	1	India	Sarvesh Anil Kushare
World Athletics Rankings	1	Italy	Stefano Sottile
World Athletics Rankings	1	Jamaica	Romaine Beckford
World Athletics Rankings	1	Puerto Rico	Luis Castro
World Athletics Rankings	1	Turkey	Alperen Acet
World Athletics Rankings	1	South Africa	Brian Raats
World Athletics Rankings	1	United States	Vernon Turner
Reallocation of rejected quotas			
Total	32		

==== Men's pole vault ====
Qualification standard	No. of athletes	NOC	Nominated athletes
Entry standard – 5.82	3	Germany	Bo Kanda Lita Baehre; Torben Blech; Oleg Zernikel
Entry standard – 5.82	3	United States	Sam Kendricks; Chris Nilsen; Jacob Wooten
Entry standard – 5.82	2	Norway	Sondre Guttormsen; Pål Haugen Lillefosse
Entry standard – 5.82	1	Australia	Kurtis Marschall
Entry standard – 5.82	1	Belgium	Ben Broeders
Entry standard – 5.82	1	France	Thibaut Collet
Entry standard – 5.82	1	Greece	Emmanouil Karalis
Entry standard – 5.82	1	Italy	Claudio Stecchi
Entry standard – 5.82	1	Netherlands	Menno Vloon
Entry standard – 5.82	1	Philippines	EJ Obiena
Entry standard – 5.82	1	Poland	Piotr Lisek
Entry standard – 5.82	1	Portugal	Pedro Buaró
Entry standard – 5.82	1	Sweden	Armand Duplantis
Entry standard – 5.82	1	Turkey	Ersu Şaşma
World Athletics Rankings	3	China	Huang Bokai; Tao Zhong; Yao Jie
World Athletics Rankings	2	Czech Republic	David Holy; Matěj Ščerba
World Athletics Rankings	2	France	Anthony Ammirati; Robin Emig
World Athletics Rankings	1	Finland	Urho Kujanpää
World Athletics Rankings	1	Latvia	Valters Kreišs
World Athletics Rankings	1	Norway	Simen Guttormsen
World Athletics Rankings	1	Poland	Robert Sobera
World Athletics Rankings	1	Qatar	Seif Heneida
World Athletics Rankings	1	Saudi Arabia	Hussain Al-Hizam
Reallocation of rejected quotas			
Total	32		

==== Men's long jump ====
Qualification standard	No. of athletes	NOC	Nominated athletes
Entry standard – 8.27	3	Jamaica	Tajay Gayle; Carey McLeod; Wayne Pinnock
Entry standard – 8.27	1	Australia	Chris Mitrevski
Entry standard – 8.27	1	China	Wang Jianan
Entry standard – 8.27	1	Chinese Taipei	Lin Yu-tang
Entry standard – 8.27	1	Croatia	Filip Pravdica
Entry standard – 8.27	0	~~Cuba~~	~~Lester Lescay~~
Entry standard – 8.27	1	Greece	Miltiadis Tentoglou
Entry standard – 8.27	0	~~India~~	~~Murali Sreeshankar~~
Entry standard – 8.27	1	Italy	Mattia Furlani
Entry standard – 8.27	1	Japan	Yuki Hashioka
Entry standard – 8.27	1	South Africa	Jovan van Vuuren
Entry standard – 8.27	1	Switzerland	Simon Ehammer
World Athletics Rankings	3	United States	Jeremiah Davis; Malcolm Clemons; Jarrion Lawson
World Athletics Rankings	2	China	Shi Yuhao; Zhang Mingkun
World Athletics Rankings	1	Australia	Liam Adcock
World Athletics Rankings	1	Brazil	Lucas Marcelino
World Athletics Rankings	1	Bulgaria	Bozhidar Saraboyukov
World Athletics Rankings	1	Colombia	Arnovis Dalmero
World Athletics Rankings	1	Cuba	Alejandro Parada
World Athletics Rankings	1	Czech Republic	Radek Juška
World Athletics Rankings	1	France	Tom Campagne
World Athletics Rankings	1	Germany	Simon Batz
World Athletics Rankings	1	Great Britain	Jacob Fincham-Dukes
World Athletics Rankings	1	South Africa	Cheswill Johnson
World Athletics Rankings	1	Sweden	Thobias Montler
World Athletics Rankings	1	Uruguay	Emiliano Lasa
World Athletics Rankings	1	Uzbekistan	Anvar Anvarov
Reallocation of rejected quotas	1	Czech Republic	Petr Meindlschmid
Reallocation of rejected quotas	1	India	Jeswin Aldrin
Invitational Places	1	Refugee Olympic Team	Mohammad Amin Alsalami
Total	33		

==== Men's triple jump ====
Qualification standard	No. of athletes	NOC	Nominated athletes
Entry standard – 17.22	2	Cuba	Lázaro Martínez; Cristian Nápoles
Entry standard – 17.22	2	United States	Salif Mane; Donald Scott
Entry standard – 17.22	1	Algeria	Yasser Triki
Entry standard – 17.22	1	Brazil	Almir dos Santos
Entry standard – 17.22	1	Burkina Faso	Hugues Fabrice Zango
Entry standard – 17.22	1	Spain	Jordan Díaz
Entry standard – 17.22	1	France	Thomas Gogois
Entry standard – 17.22	1	Jamaica	Jaydon Hibbert
Entry standard – 17.22	1	Italy	Andy Díaz
Entry standard – 17.22	1	Portugal	Pedro Pichardo
World Athletics Rankings	3	China	Fang Yaoqing; Su Wen; Zhu Yaming
World Athletics Rankings	2	India	Praveen Chithravel; Abdulla Aboobacker
World Athletics Rankings	2	Italy	Andrea Dallavalle; Emmanuel Ihemeje
World Athletics Rankings	1	Australia	Connor Murphy
World Athletics Rankings	1	Bermuda	Jah-Nhai Perinchief
World Athletics Rankings	1	Colombia	Geiner Moreno
World Athletics Rankings	1	Cuba	Andy Hechavarría
World Athletics Rankings	1	France	Jean-Marc Pontvianne
World Athletics Rankings	1	Germany	Max Heß
World Athletics Rankings	1	Jamaica	Jordan Scott
World Athletics Rankings	1	New Zealand	Ethan Olivier
World Athletics Rankings	1	Portugal	Tiago Pereira
World Athletics Rankings	1	South Korea	Kim Jangwoo
World Athletics Rankings	1	Turkey	Necati Er
World Athletics Rankings	1	Venezuela	Leodan Torrealba
World Athletics Rankings	1	United States	Russell Robinson
Reallocation of rejected quotas			
Total	32		

==== Men's shot put ====
Qualification standard	No. of athletes	NOC	Nominated athletes
Entry standard – 21.50	3	United States	Ryan Crouser; Joe Kovacs; Payton Otterdahl
Entry standard – 21.50	2	Italy	Leonardo Fabbri; Zane Weir
Entry standard – 21.50	2	New Zealand	Tom Walsh; Jacko Gill
Entry standard – 21.50	0	~~Brazil~~	~~Darlan Romani~~
Entry standard – 21.50	1	Croatia	Filip Mihaljević
Entry standard – 21.50	1	Czech Republic	Tomáš Staněk
Entry standard – 21.50	1	Jamaica	Rajindra Campbell
Entry standard – 21.50	1	Luxembourg	Bob Bertemes
Entry standard – 21.50	1	Mexico	Uziel Muñoz
Entry standard – 21.50	1	Nigeria	Chukwuebuka Enekwechi
Entry standard – 21.50	1	Saudi Arabia	Mohammed Tolo
World Athletics Rankings	2	Egypt	Mostafa Amr Hassan; Mohamed Khalifa
World Athletics Rankings	2	Poland	Konrad Bukowiecki; Michał Haratyk
World Athletics Rankings	2	Portugal	Tsanko Arnaudov; Fransisco Belo
World Athletics Rankings	1	Argentina	Nazareno Sasia
World Athletics Rankings	1	Bosnia and Herzegovina	Mesud Pezer
World Athletics Rankings	1	Brazil	Welington Morais
World Athletics Rankings	1	Great Britain	Scott Lincoln
World Athletics Rankings	1	India	Tajinderpal Singh Toor
World Athletics Rankings	1	Ireland	Eric Favors
World Athletics Rankings	1	Norway	Marcus Thomsen
World Athletics Rankings	1	Romania	Andrei Rares Toader
World Athletics Rankings	1	Serbia	Armin Sinančević
World Athletics Rankings	1	South Africa	Kyle Blignaut
World Athletics Rankings	1	Ukraine	Roman Kokoshko
Reallocation of rejected quotas			
Total	32		

==== Men's discus throw ====
Qualification standard	No. of athletes	NOC	Nominated athletes
Entry standard – 67.20	3	Jamaica	Ralford Mullings; Traves Smikle; Rojé Stona
Entry standard – 67.20	3	Germany	Miká Sosna; Clemens Prüfer; Henrik Janssen
Entry standard – 67.20	2	Lithuania	Mykolas Alekna; Andrius Gudžius
Entry standard – 67.20	2	United States	Joseph Brown; Andrew Evans
Entry standard – 67.20	1	Australia	Matthew Denny
Entry standard – 67.20	1	Austria	Lukas Weißhaidinger
Entry standard – 67.20	1	Chile	Claudio Romero
Entry standard – 67.20	1	Colombia	Mauricio Ortega
Entry standard – 67.20	1	France	Tom Reux
Entry standard – 67.20	1	Great Britain	Nick Percy
Entry standard – 67.20	1	New Zealand	Connor Bell
Entry standard – 67.20	1	Samoa	Alex Rose
Entry standard – 67.20	1	Slovenia	Kristjan Čeh
Entry standard – 67.20	1	South Africa	Francois Prinsloo
Entry standard – 67.20	1	Sweden	Daniel Ståhl
World Athletics Rankings	1	Algeria	Oussama Khennoussi
World Athletics Rankings	1	Belgium	Philip Milanov
World Athletics Rankings	1	Croatia	Martin Marković
World Athletics Rankings	1	Cuba	Mario Díaz
World Athletics Rankings	1	Ecuador	Juan José Caicedo
World Athletics Rankings	1	France	Lolassonn Djouhan
World Athletics Rankings	1	Great Britain	Lawrence Okoye
World Athletics Rankings	1	Lithuania	Martynas Alekna
World Athletics Rankings	1	Romania	Alin Firfirică
World Athletics Rankings	1	South Africa	Victor Hogan
World Athletics Rankings	1	United States	Sam Mattis
Reallocation of rejected quotas			
Total	32		

==== Men's hammer throw ====
Qualification standard	No. of athletes	NOC	Nominated athletes
Entry standard – 78.20	2	Poland	Wojciech Nowicki; Paweł Fajdek
Entry standard – 78.20	2	United States	Rudy Winkler; Daniel Haugh
Entry standard – 78.20	1	Canada	Ethan Katzberg
Entry standard – 78.20	1	France	Yann Chaussinand
Entry standard – 78.20	1	Germany	Merlin Hummel
Entry standard – 78.20	1	Hungary	Bence Halász
Entry standard – 78.20	1	Netherlands	Denzel Comenentia
Entry standard – 78.20	1	Ukraine	Mykhaylo Kokhan
World Athletics Rankings	2	Canada	Rowan Hamilton; Adam Keenan
World Athletics Rankings	2	Chile	Gabriel Kehr; Humberto Mansilla
World Athletics Rankings	2	Czech Republic	Patrik Hájek; Volodymyr Myslyvčuk
World Athletics Rankings	0	~~Great Britain~~	~~Kenneth Ikeji~~; ~~Jake Norris~~
World Athletics Rankings	2	Greece	Michail Anastasakis; Christos Frantzeskakis
World Athletics Rankings	2	Norway	Eivind Henriksen; Thomas Mardal
World Athletics Rankings	1	Argentina	Joaquín Gómez
World Athletics Rankings	1	China	Wang Qi
World Athletics Rankings	1	Croatia	Matija Gregurić
World Athletics Rankings	1	Egypt	Mostafa Elgamel
World Athletics Rankings	1	Germany	Sören Klose
World Athletics Rankings	1	Hungary	Dániel Rába
World Athletics Rankings	1	Mexico	Diego del Real
World Athletics Rankings	1	Moldova	Serghei Marghiev
World Athletics Rankings	1	Sweden	Ragnar Carlsson
World Athletics Rankings	1	Turkey	Özkan Baltacı
Reallocation of rejected quotas	1	Hungary	Donát Varga
Reallocation of rejected quotas	1	Puerto Rico	Jerome Vega
Total	32		

==== Men's javelin throw ====
Qualification standard	No. of athletes	NOC	Nominated athletes
Entry standard – 85.50	2	Germany	Julian Weber; Max Dehning
Entry standard – 85.50	2	India	Neeraj Chopra; Kishore Jena
Entry standard – 85.50	1	Brazil	Luiz Maurício da Silva
Entry standard – 85.50	1	Czech Republic	Jakub Vadlejch
Entry standard – 85.50	1	Finland	Oliver Helander
Entry standard – 85.50	1	France	Teuraiterai Tupaia
Entry standard – 85.50	1	Grenada	Anderson Peters
Entry standard – 85.50	1	Lithuania	Edis Matusevičius
Entry standard – 85.50	1	Pakistan	Arshad Nadeem
World Athletics Rankings	2	Egypt	Ihab Abdelrahman; Moustafa Mahmoud
World Athletics Rankings	2	Finland	Lassi Etelätalo; Toni Keränen
World Athletics Rankings	2	Latvia	Gatis Čakšs; Patriks Gailums
World Athletics Rankings	2	Poland	Marcin Krukowski; Cyprian Mrzygłód
World Athletics Rankings	1	Australia	Cameron McEntyre
World Athletics Rankings	1	Belgium	Timothy Herman
World Athletics Rankings	1	Brazil	Pedro Henrique Rodrigues
World Athletics Rankings	0	~~India~~	~~D.P. Manu~~
World Athletics Rankings	1	Japan	Roderick Genki Dean
World Athletics Rankings	1	Kenya	Julius Yego
World Athletics Rankings	1	Moldova	Andrian Mardare
World Athletics Rankings	1	Nigeria	Nnamdi Chinecherem
World Athletics Rankings	1	Portugal	Leandro Ramos
World Athletics Rankings	1	Romania	Alexandru Novac
World Athletics Rankings	1	Trinidad and Tobago	Keshorn Walcott
World Athletics Rankings	1	Ukraine	Artur Felfner
World Athletics Rankings	1	United States	Curtis Thompson
Reallocation of rejected quotas	1	Poland	Dawid Wegner
Total	32		

=== Women's field events ===
==== Women's high jump ====
Qualification standard	No. of athletes	NOC	Nominated athletes
Entry standard – 1.97	3	Ukraine	Iryna Gerashchenko; Yuliya Levchenko; Yaroslava Mahuchikh
Entry standard – 1.97	2	Australia	Nicola Olyslagers; Eleanor Patterson
Entry standard – 1.97	2	United States	Vashti Cunningham; Rachel Glenn
Entry standard – 1.97	1	Cyprus	Elena Kulichenko
Entry standard – 1.97	1	Finland	Ella Junnila
Entry standard – 1.97	1	Ghana	Rose Amoanimaa Yeboah
Entry standard – 1.97	1	Great Britain	Morgan Lake
Entry standard – 1.97	1	Jamaica	Lamara Distin
Entry standard – 1.97	1	Lithuania	Airinė Palšytė
Entry standard – 1.97	1	Nigeria	Temitope Adeshina
Entry standard – 1.97	1	Poland	Maryia Zhodzik
Entry standard – 1.97	1	Serbia	Angelina Topić
World Athletics Rankings	2	France	Solène Gicquel; Nawal Meniker
World Athletics Rankings	2	Germany	Christina Honsel; Imke Onnen
World Athletics Rankings	2	Kazakhstan	Nadezhda Dubovitskaya; Yelizaveta Matveyeva
World Athletics Rankings	1	Brazil	Valdiléia Martins
World Athletics Rankings	1	Bulgaria	Mirela Demireva
World Athletics Rankings	1	Czech Republic	Michaela Hrubá
World Athletics Rankings	1	Estonia	Elisabeth Pihela
World Athletics Rankings	1	Greece	Tatiana Gusin
World Athletics Rankings	1	Romania	Daniela Stanciu
World Athletics Rankings	1	Slovenia	Lia Apostolovski
World Athletics Rankings	0	~~Sweden~~	~~Maja Nilsson~~
World Athletics Rankings	1	Turkey	Buse Savaşkan
World Athletics Rankings	1	Uzbekistan	Safina Sadullayeva
Reallocation of rejected quotas	1	Greece	Panagiota Dosi
Total	32		

==== Women's pole vault ====
Qualification standard	No. of athletes	NOC	Nominated athletes
Entry standard – 4.73	3	United States	Brynn King; Katie Moon; Bridget Williams
Entry standard – 4.73	1	Australia	Nina Kennedy
Entry standard – 4.73	1	Canada	Alysha Newman
Entry standard – 4.73	1	Czech Republic	Amálie Švábíková
Entry standard – 4.73	1	Finland	Wilma Murto
Entry standard – 4.73	1	Great Britain	Molly Caudery
Entry standard – 4.73	1	Greece	Aikaterini Stefanidi
Entry standard – 4.73	1	Italy	Roberta Bruni
Entry standard – 4.73	1	New Zealand	Eliza McCartney
Entry standard – 4.73	1	Slovenia	Tina Sutej
Entry standard – 4.73	1	Switzerland	Angelica Moser
World Athletics Rankings	3	France	Marie-Julie Bonnin; Ninon Chapelle; Margot Chevrier
World Athletics Rankings	1	China	~~Li Ling~~; Niu Chunge
World Athletics Rankings	2	Greece	Ariadni Adamopoulou; Eleni-Klaoudia Polak
World Athletics Rankings	2	New Zealand	Imogen Ayris; Olivia McTaggart
World Athletics Rankings	1	Brazil	Juliana Campos
World Athletics Rankings	1	Canada	Anicka Newell
World Athletics Rankings	1	Finland	Elina Lampela
World Athletics Rankings	1	Germany	Anjuli Knäsche
World Athletics Rankings	1	Great Britain	Holly Bradshaw
World Athletics Rankings	1	Hungary	Hanga Klekner
World Athletics Rankings	1	Italy	Elisa Molinarolo
World Athletics Rankings	1	Norway	Lene Onsrud Retzius
World Athletics Rankings	1	Switzerland	Pascale Stöcklin
World Athletics Rankings	1	Venezuela	Robeilys Peinado
Reallocation of rejected quotas			
Total	32		

==== Women's long jump ====
Qualification standard	No. of athletes	NOC	Nominated athletes
Entry standard – 6.86	3	United States	Tara Davis-Woodhall; Jasmine Moore; Monae' Nichols
Entry standard – 6.86	2	Germany	Mikaelle Assani; Malaika Mihambo
Entry standard – 6.86	2	Serbia	Milica Gardašević; Ivana Španović
Entry standard – 6.86	1	Bulgaria	Plamena Mitkova
Entry standard – 6.86	1	Burkina Faso	Marthe Koala
Entry standard – 6.86	1	Colombia	Natalia Linares
Entry standard – 6.86	1	France	Hilary Kpatcha
Entry standard – 6.86	1	Italy	Larissa Iapichino
Entry standard – 6.86	1	Japan	Sumire Hata
Entry standard – 6.86	1	Nigeria	Ruth Usoro
Entry standard – 6.86	1	Portugal	Agate de Sousa
Entry standard – 6.86	1	Romania	Alina Rotaru-Kottmann
World Athletics Rankings	2	Jamaica	Chanice Porter; Ackelia Smith
World Athletics Rankings	2	Nigeria	Ese Brume; Prestina Ochonogor
World Athletics Rankings	2	Spain	Fátima Diame; Tessy Ebosele
World Athletics Rankings	1	Australia	Brooke Buschkuehl
World Athletics Rankings	1	Brazil	Eliane Martins
World Athletics Rankings	1	China	Xiong Shiqi
World Athletics Rankings	1	Germany	Maryse Luzolo
World Athletics Rankings	0	~~Great Britain~~	~~Jazmin Sawyers~~
World Athletics Rankings	1	Hungary	Petra Farkas
World Athletics Rankings	1	Netherlands	Pauline Hondema
World Athletics Rankings	1	Poland	Nikola Horowska
World Athletics Rankings	1	Romania	Florentina Iușco
World Athletics Rankings	0	~~Switzerland~~	~~Annik Kälin~~
Reallocation of rejected quotas	1	Brazil	Lissandra Campos
Reallocation of rejected quotas	1	Egypt	Esraa Owis
Total	32		

==== Women's triple jump ====
Qualification standard	No. of athletes	NOC	Nominated athletes
Entry standard – 14.55	2	Cuba	Leyanis Pérez; Liadagmis Povea
Entry standard – 14.55	2	Jamaica	Shanieka Ricketts; Kimberly Williams
Entry standard – 14.55	1	Dominica	Thea LaFond
Entry standard – 14.55	1	France	Ilionis Guillaume
Entry standard – 14.55	1	Spain	Ana Peleteiro
Entry standard – 14.55	1	Turkey	Tuğba Danışmaz
Entry standard – 14.55	1	Ukraine	Maryna Bekh-Romanchuk
Entry standard – 14.55	0	~~Venezuela~~	~~Yulimar Rojas~~
World Athletics Rankings	3	Romania	Diana Ana Maria Ion; Florentina Iușco; Elena Andreea Taloş
World Athletics Rankings	3	United States	Tori Franklin; Jasmine Moore; Keturah Orji
World Athletics Rankings	1	Bulgaria	~~Aleksandra Nacheva~~; Gabriela Petrova
World Athletics Rankings	2	Italy	Ottavia Cestonaro; Dariya Derkach
World Athletics Rankings	1	Bahamas	Charisma Taylor
World Athletics Rankings	1	Brazil	Gabriele dos Santos
World Athletics Rankings	1	China	Zeng Rui
World Athletics Rankings	1	Finland	Senni Salminen
World Athletics Rankings	1	Jamaica	Ackelia Smith
World Athletics Rankings	1	Japan	Mariko Morimoto
World Athletics Rankings	1	Lithuania	Dovilė Kilty
World Athletics Rankings	1	Senegal	Saly Sarr
World Athletics Rankings	1	Slovenia	Neja Filipič
World Athletics Rankings	0	~~Spain~~	~~María Vicente~~
World Athletics Rankings	1	Sweden	Maja Åskag
World Athletics Rankings	1	Ukraine	Olha Korsun
Reallocation of rejected quotas	1	Latvia	Rūta Kate Lasmane
Reallocation of rejected quotas	1	Lithuania	Diana Zagainova
Reallocation of rejected quotas	1	Uzbekistan	Sharifa Davronova
Total	32		

==== Women's shot put ====
Qualification standard	No. of athletes	NOC	Nominated athletes
Entry standard – 18.80	3	United States	Chase Jackson; Jaida Ross; Raven Saunders
Entry standard – 18.80	2	China	Song Jiayuan; Gong Lijiao
Entry standard – 18.80	2	Germany	Katharina Maisch; Yemisi Ogunleye
Entry standard – 18.80	2	Netherlands	Jorinde van Klinken; Jessica Schilder
Entry standard – 18.80	1	Portugal	~~Auriol Dongmo~~; Jessica Inchude
Entry standard – 18.80	2	Sweden	Axelina Johansson; Fanny Roos
Entry standard – 18.80	1	Canada	Sarah Mitton
Entry standard – 18.80	1	Jamaica	Danniel Thomas-Dodd
Entry standard – 18.80	1	New Zealand	Maddi Wesche
World Athletics Rankings	1	Brazil	Ana Caroline Silva
World Athletics Rankings	1	Chile	Ivana Gallardo
World Athletics Rankings	1	China	Sun Yue
World Athletics Rankings	1	Germany	Alina Kenzel
World Athletics Rankings	0	Great Britain	~~Amelia Campbell~~
World Athletics Rankings	0	India	~~Abha Khatua~~
World Athletics Rankings	1	Jamaica	Lloydricia Cameron
World Athletics Rankings	1	Moldova	Dimitriana Bezede
World Athletics Rankings	1	Netherlands	Alida van Daalen
World Athletics Rankings	1	Poland	Klaudia Kardasz
World Athletics Rankings	1	Portugal	Eliana Bandeira
World Athletics Rankings	1	South Africa	Miné de Klerk
World Athletics Rankings	1	Spain	María Belén Toimil
World Athletics Rankings	0	Sweden	~~Sara Lennman~~
World Athletics Rankings	1	Trinidad and Tobago	Portious Warren
World Athletics Rankings	1	Turkey	Emel Dereli
Reallocation of rejected quotas	1	Chile	Natalia Duco
Reallocation of rejected quotas	1	Iceland	Erna Sóley Gunnarsdóttir
Reallocation of rejected quotas	1	South Africa	Ashley Erasmus
Reallocation of rejected quotas	1	Brazil	Livia Avancini
Total	32		

==== Women's discus throw ====
Qualification standard	No. of athletes	NOC	Nominated athletes
Entry standard – 64.50	3	Germany	Shanice Craft; Kristin Pudenz; Marike Steinacker
Entry standard – 64.50	0	~~Cuba~~	~~Denia Caballero~~; ~~Yaime Pérez~~
Entry standard – 64.50	2	Netherlands	Alida van Daalen; Jorinde van Klinken
Entry standard – 64.50	2	Portugal	Liliana Cá; Irina Rodrigues
Entry standard – 64.50	2	United States	Valarie Allman; Veronica Fraley
Entry standard – 64.50	1	Brazil	Izabela da Silva
Entry standard – 64.50	1	China	Feng Bin
Entry standard – 64.50	1	Croatia	Sandra Elkasević
Entry standard – 64.50	1	Lithuania	Ieva Gumbs
World Athletics Rankings	3	Nigeria	Obiageri Pamela Amaechi; Ashley Anumba; Chioma Onyekwere
World Athletics Rankings	2	Sweden	Vanessa Kamga; Caisa-Marie Lindfors
World Athletics Rankings	1	Australia	Taryn Gollshewsky
World Athletics Rankings	1	Brazil	Andressa de Morais
World Athletics Rankings	1	China	Jiang Zhichao
World Athletics Rankings	1	Croatia	Marija Tolj
World Athletics Rankings	1	Cuba	Silinda Moráles
World Athletics Rankings	1	France	Melina Robert-Michon
World Athletics Rankings	0	~~Great Britain~~	~~Jade Lally~~
World Athletics Rankings	1	Jamaica	Samantha Hall
World Athletics Rankings	1	Italy	Daisy Osakue
World Athletics Rankings	1	Moldova	Alexandra Emilianov
World Athletics Rankings	1	Poland	Daria Zabawska
World Athletics Rankings	1	United States	Jayden Ulrich
Reallocation of rejected quotas	1	Cuba	Melany del Pilar Matheus
Reallocation of rejected quotas	1	Denmark	Lisa Brix Pedersen
Reallocation of rejected quotas	1	Thailand	Subenrat Insaeng
Total	32		

==== Women's hammer throw ====
Qualification standard	No. of athletes	NOC	Nominated athletes
Entry standard – 74.00	3	United States	Annette Echikunwoke; DeAnna Price; Erin Reese
Entry standard – 74.00	2	China	Wang Zheng; Zhao Jie
Entry standard – 74.00	2	Finland	Silja Kosonen; Krista Tervo
Entry standard – 74.00	1	Azerbaijan	Hanna Skydan
Entry standard – 74.00	1	Canada	Camryn Rogers
Entry standard – 74.00	1	Italy	Sara Fantini
Entry standard – 74.00	1	Moldova	Zalina Marghieva
Entry standard – 74.00	1	Poland	Anita Włodarczyk
Entry standard – 74.00	1	Romania	Bianca Ghelber
World Athletics Rankings	2	France	Rose Loga; Alexandra Tavernier
World Athletics Rankings	1	Sweden	~~Rebecka Hallerth~~; Thea Löfman
World Athletics Rankings	1	Algeria	Zahra Tatar
World Athletics Rankings	1	Belgium	Vanessa Sterckendries
World Athletics Rankings	1	China	Li Jiangyan
World Athletics Rankings	1	Denmark	Katrine Koch Jacobsen
World Athletics Rankings	1	Finland	Suvi Koskinen
World Athletics Rankings	0	~~Great Britain~~	~~Anna Purchase~~
World Athletics Rankings	1	Greece	Stamatia Scarvelis
World Athletics Rankings	1	Hungary	Réka Gyurátz
World Athletics Rankings	1	Ireland	Nicola Tuthill
World Athletics Rankings	0	~~Jamaica~~	~~Nayoka Clunis~~
World Athletics Rankings	1	New Zealand	Lauren Bruce
World Athletics Rankings	1	Nigeria	Oyesade Olatoye
World Athletics Rankings	1	Norway	Beatrice Nedberge Llano
World Athletics Rankings	1	Poland	Malwina Kopron
World Athletics Rankings	1	Venezuela	Rosa Rodríguez
Reallocation of rejected quotas	1	Australia	Stephanie Ratcliffe
Reallocation of rejected quotas	1	Colombia	Mayra Gaviria
Reallocation of rejected quotas	1	Ukraine	Iryna Klymets
Total	32		

==== Women's javelin throw ====
Qualification standard	No. of athletes	NOC	Nominated athletes
Entry standard – 64.00	1	Australia	Mackenzie Little
Entry standard – 64.00	1	Austria	Victoria Hudson
Entry standard – 64.00	1	Bahamas	Rhema Otabor
Entry standard – 64.00	1	Colombia	Flor Ruiz
Entry standard – 64.00	1	Japan	Haruka Kitaguchi
Entry standard – 64.00	1	Latvia	Līna Mūze
Entry standard – 64.00	1	Serbia	Adriana Vilagoš
Entry standard – 64.00	1	United States	Maggie Malone-Hardin
World Athletics Rankings	2	China	Dai Qianqian; ~~Liu Shiying~~; Lü Huihui
World Athletics Rankings	2	Australia	Kelsey-Lee Barber; Kathryn Mitchell
World Athletics Rankings	2	Czech Republic	Nikola Ogrodníková; Petra Sičaková
World Athletics Rankings	2	Japan	Marina Saito; Momone Ueda
World Athletics Rankings	1	Brazil	Jucilene de Lima
World Athletics Rankings	1	Colombia	María Lucelly Murillo
World Athletics Rankings	1	Croatia	Sara Kolak
World Athletics Rankings	1	Finland	Anni-Linnea Alanen
World Athletics Rankings	1	Germany	Christin Hussong
World Athletics Rankings	1	Greece	Elina Tzengko
World Athletics Rankings	1	India	Annu Rani
World Athletics Rankings	1	Latvia	Anete Sietiņa
World Athletics Rankings	1	Lithuania	Liveta Jasiūnaitė
World Athletics Rankings	1	New Zealand	Tori Peeters
World Athletics Rankings	1	Norway	Marie-Therese Obst
World Athletics Rankings	1	Poland	Maria Andrejczyk
World Athletics Rankings	1	South Africa	Jo-Ane van Dyk
World Athletics Rankings	1	Spain	Yulenmis Aguilar
World Athletics Rankings	1	Sri Lanka	Dilhani Lekamge
Reallocation of rejected quotas	1	Turkey	Eda Tuğsuz
Total	32		

== Combined events ==
=== Men's decathlon ===
Qualification standard	No. of athletes	NOC	Nominated athletes
Entry standard – 8460	3	Estonia	Johannes Erm; Janek Õiglane; Karel Tilga
Entry standard – 8460	3	United States	Heath Baldwin; Harrison Williams; Zach Ziemek
Entry standard – 8460	2	Canada	Pierce LePage; Damian Warner
Entry standard – 8460	2	France	Kevin Mayer; Makenson Gletty
Entry standard – 8460	2	Germany	Niklas Kaul; Leo Neugebauer
Entry standard – 8460	2	Norway	Sander Skotheim; Markus Rooth
Entry standard – 8460	1	Grenada	Lindon Victor
Entry standard – 8460	1	Netherlands	Sven Roosen
Entry standard – 8460	1	Puerto Rico	Ayden Owens-Delerme
World Athletics Rankings	2	Australia	Daniel Golubovic; Ashley Moloney
World Athletics Rankings	1	Brazil	José Fernando Ferreira
World Athletics Rankings	1	Germany	Manuel Eitel
World Athletics Rankings	1	Bahamas	Ken Mullings
World Athletics Rankings	1	Spain	Jorge Ureña
World Athletics Rankings	0	Switzerland	~~Simon Ehammer~~
Reallocation of rejected quotas	1	Netherlands	Rik Taam
Total	24		

=== Women's heptathlon ===
Qualification standard	No. of athletes	NOC	Nominated athletes
Entry standard – 6480	2	Belgium	Nafissatou Thiam; Noor Vidts
Entry standard – 6480	2	Netherlands	Emma Oosterwegel; Anouk Vetter
Entry standard – 6480	1	France	Auriana Lazraq-Khlass
Entry standard – 6480	1	Great Britain	Katarina Johnson-Thompson
Entry standard – 6480	1	Poland	Adrianna Sułek
Entry standard – 6480	1	Switzerland	Annik Kälin
Entry standard – 6480	1	United States	Anna Hall
World Athletics Rankings	2	Australia	Camryn Newton-Smith; Tori West
World Athletics Rankings	2	Germany	Carolin Schäfer; Sophie Weißenberg
World Athletics Rankings	2	Hungary	Xénia Krizsán; Rita Nemes
World Athletics Rankings	2	United States	Taliyah Brooks; Chari Hawkins
World Athletics Rankings	1	Colombia	Martha Araújo
World Athletics Rankings	1	Finland	Saga Vanninen
World Athletics Rankings	1	Great Britain	Jade O'Dowda
World Athletics Rankings	1	Ireland	Kate O'Connor
World Athletics Rankings	1	Italy	Sveva Gerevini
World Athletics Rankings	1	Netherlands	Sofie Dokter
World Athletics Rankings	1	Uzbekistan	Ekaterina Voronina
Reallocation of rejected quotas			
Total	24		

== Relay events ==
=== Men's 4 × 100 m relay ===
Qualification event	No. of teams	Qualified teams
2024 World Athletics Relays	14	Australia; Canada; China; France; Germany; Ghana; Great Britain; Italy; Jamaica; Japan; Liberia; Nigeria; South Africa; United States
World Athletics Top List (as of June 30, 2024)	2	Brazil; Netherlands
Total	16	

=== Men's 4 × 400 m relay ===
Qualification event	No. of teams	Qualified teams
2024 World Athletics Relays	14	Belgium; Botswana; Brazil; Germany; Great Britain; India; Italy; Japan; Nigeria; Poland; South Africa; Spain; Trinidad and Tobago; United States
World Athletics Top List (as of June 30, 2024)	2	France; Zambia
Total	16	

=== Women's 4 × 100 m relay ===
Qualification event	No. of teams	Qualified teams
2024 World Athletics Relays	14	Australia; Canada; France; Germany; Great Britain; Italy; Ivory Coast; Jamaica; Netherlands; Nigeria; Poland; Switzerland; Trinidad and Tobago; United States
World Athletics Top List (as of June 30, 2024)	2	Spain; Belgium
Total	16	

=== Women's 4 × 400 m relay ===
Qualification event	No. of teams	Qualified teams
2024 World Athletics Relays	14	Belgium; Canada; France; Great Britain; India; Ireland; Italy; Jamaica; Netherlands; Norway; Poland; Spain; Switzerland; United States
World Athletics Top List (as of June 30, 2024)	2	Germany; Cuba
Total	16	

=== Mixed 4 × 400 m relay ===
Qualification event	No. of teams	Qualified teams
2024 World Athletics Relays	14	Bahamas; Belgium; Dominican Republic; France; Germany; Great Britain; Ireland; Jamaica; Netherlands; Nigeria; Poland; Switzerland; Ukraine; United States
World Athletics Top List (as of June 30, 2024)	2	Italy; Kenya
Total	16	

=== Marathon race walking mixed relay ===
Qualification event	No. of teams	Qualified countries
2024 World Athletics Race Walking Team Championships	2	Australia; China; Colombia; Japan; Spain
2024 World Athletics Race Walking Team Championships	1	Brazil; Canada; France; Germany; Hungary; India; Italy; Mexico; Poland; Slovakia; Turkey; Ukraine
World Athletics Rankings (as of June 30, 2024)	1	Ecuador; Peru; Czech Republic
Total	25	

== See also ==
- Athletics at the 2024 Summer Paralympics – Qualification

== Notes ==
1. a: NOCs must select a maximum of three athletes among those who qualified for the same event.
