= Deresa Geleta =

Ethiopian long-distance runner

Personal information
- Full name: Deresa Geleta Ulfata
- Born: 14 January 1996 (age 30) Midakegn, Oromia, Ethiopia

Sport
- Country: Ethiopia
- Sport: Athletics
- Events: Marathon, half marathon
- Club: Elite Running Team

Achievements and titles
- Personal bests: Marathon: 2:02:38 (Valencia 2024); Half-marathon: 1:02:14 (Meishan 2026)
Medal record
World Marathon Majors
| Silver medal – second place | 2025 Tokyo | Marathon |

Deresa Geleta Ulfata (born 14 January 1996) is an Ethiopian long-distance runner who specializes in the marathon and half marathon.

He won the 2024 Seville Marathon in a course record time of 2:03:27, setting his then personal best. This qualified him for the 2024 Summer Olympics, where he would finish fifth in 2:07:31.

Among other results, Geleta has also won the 2023 Beijing Marathon and the 2022 Lagos City Marathon. At the 2024 Valencia Marathon, Geleta set his personal best of 2:02:38, finishing second, and placing him as the 11th fastest marathoner of all time. At the 2026 London Marathon, Geleta finished in fifth with a time of 2:03:23.

Geleta ran his debut half marathon at the Meishan Renshou Half Marathon in 1:02:14.
