= Akira Akasaki =

Japanese long-distance runner

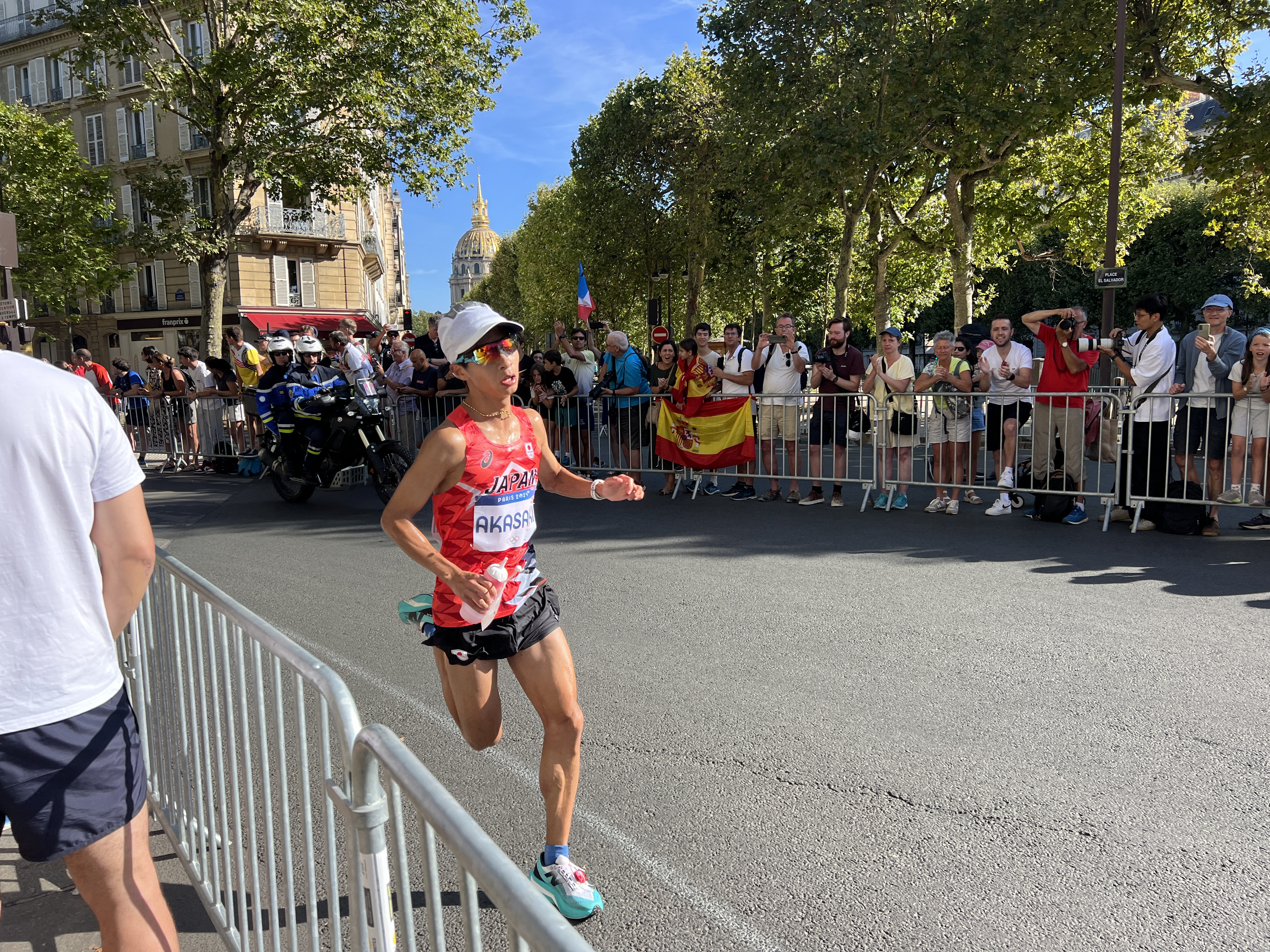
- Akasaki at the 2024 Summer Olympics

Personal information
- Born: 21 January 1998 (age 28) Ōzu, Kumamoto, Japan

Sport
- Sport: Athletics
- Events: 5000 metres; 10,000 metres; Marathon
- University team: Takushoku University
Medal record
World Marathon Majors
Silver medal – second place	2025 Berlin	Marathon

Akira Akasaki (赤﨑暁, Akasaki Akira, born 21 January 1998) is a Japanese long-distance runner. He finished sixth in the marathon at the 2024 Summer Olympics.

== Personal bests ==
- 5000 metres – 13:27.79 (Abashiri 2023)
- 10,000 metres – 27:43.84 (Fukuroi 2024)
- Half Marathon – 1:01:46 (Yamaguchi 2023)
- Marathon – 2:05:47 (Chicago 2026)
