= Athletics at the 2024 Summer Olympics – Men's marathon =

Men's marathon at the Games of the XXXIII Olympiad
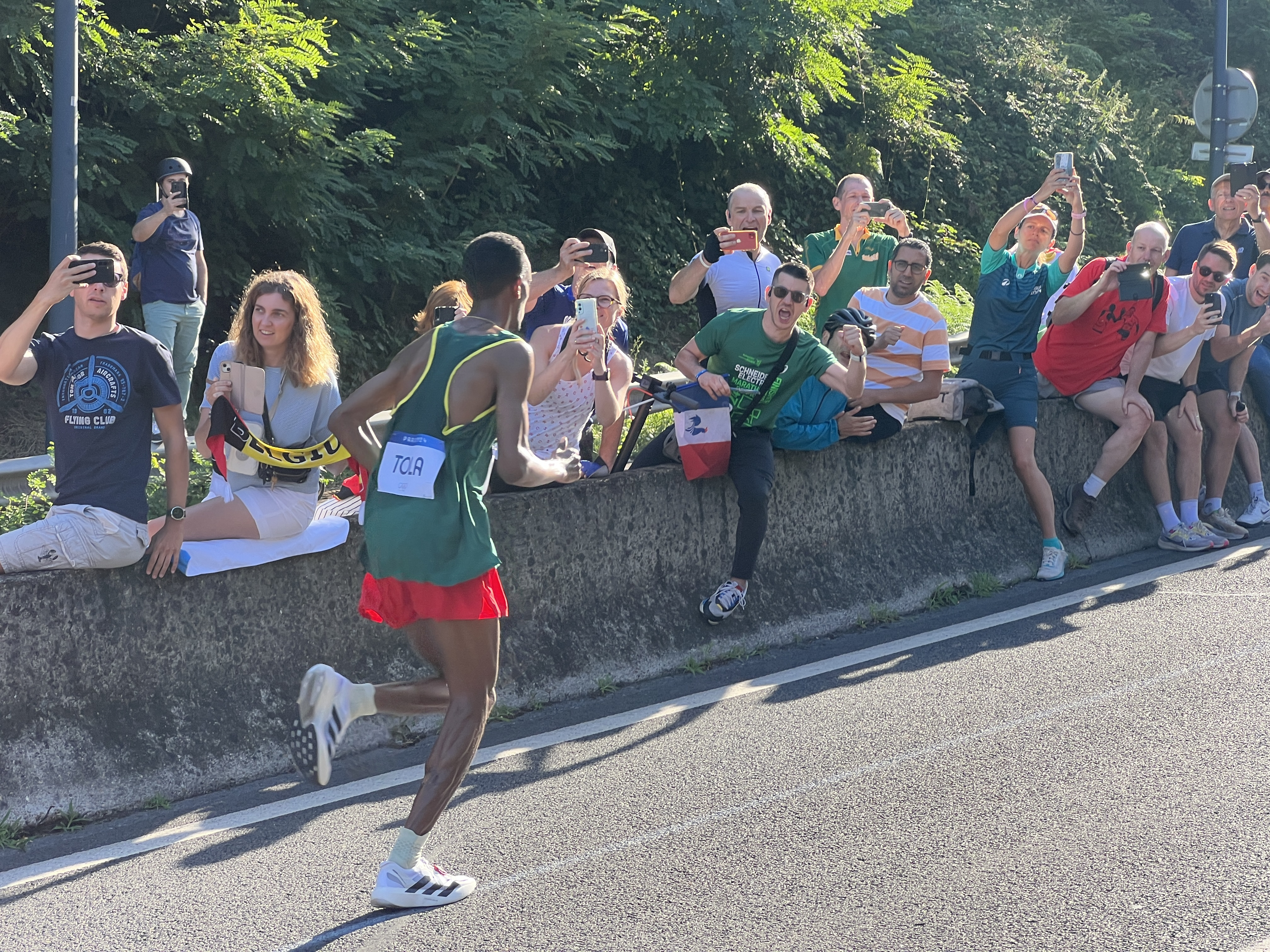
- Tamirat Tola at kilometre 29.
- Venue: Paris
- Date: 10 August 2024
- Winning time: 2:06:26 OR

Medalists
1st place, gold medalist(s)		Tamirat Tola	Ethiopia
2nd place, silver medalist(s)		Bashir Abdi	Belgium
3rd place, bronze medalist(s)		Benson Kipruto	Kenya

Official Video

The men's marathon at the 2024 Summer Olympics was held in Paris, France, on 10 August 2024. This was the 30th time that the men's marathon was contested at the Summer Olympics.

== Summary ==
The men's marathon at the 2024 Summer Olympics took place on August 10, 2024, in Paris, France. The race featured the return of all three medalists from the Tokyo 2020 Olympics: two-time gold medalist Eliud Kipchoge of Kenya, silver medalist Abdi Nageeye of the Netherlands, and bronze medalist Bashir Abdi of Belgium. Kipchoge, the champion of the past two Olympic marathons, sought to make history with a victory in Paris becoming the first athlete to win three Olympic gold medals in the marathon. 2022 World Championship gold medalist Tamirat Tola, who also took silver back in 2017 and a track 10,000 bronze medal from 2016, came here as the alternate filling the shoes of injured Sisay Lemma. Abdi was also bronze medalist in 2022. 2023 World Champion Victor Kiplangat and silver medalist Maru Teferi are also entered. Yaseen Abdalla represented Qatar, making his marathon debut through a universality place. The marathon world record holder, Kelvin Kiptum, was killed in a car accident in February 2024.

The race commenced at 08:00 Central European Summer Time (UTC+2) under favorable weather conditions. In the initial stages, nearly 43 year old Bat-Ochir Ser-Od of Mongolia led the pack for the first 5 kilometers, followed by Héctor Garibay taking the front position until the 10-kilometer mark. Around 12 kilometers, Eyob Faniel of Italy made a significant surge, increasing the pace to 3:00 per kilometer, establishing a 23-second lead by the 15-kilometer point. The field was going closer to 3:07. However, the first series of hills had already begun when Faniel had 23 seconds over the field at 15K.

The hilly sections of the course significantly impacted the race dynamics, it broke apart the large pack, the lead "chase group" included Tamirat Tola, Bashir Abdi, Conner Mantz, Alphonce Simbu, Akira Akasaki, Elroy Gelant, Suguru Osako, with Deresa Geleta and Clayton Young hanging on the back. The earlier lead athlete Eyob Faniel began to slow on the inclines, reducing his advantage to 11 seconds by the 20K mark. Seizing the opportunity, Tola and Mantz began to accelerate and close their gap between them and Faniel, catching Faniel just over half a kilometer later. The three crossed the half marathon mark in 1:04:51. Geleta was next, 7 seconds back. With the easy downhill section, it took the lead chase group a little over 2K to catch back up to the leaders.

The subsequent downhill segment allowed the chase group to regroup, forming a lead pack of 15 runners by the 25K mark, with Akasaki marginally ahead. Faniel had by then fallen behind the leaders. Approaching the 28K mark, the course's challenging hills resumed. Akasaki maintained his lead initially, but Tola soon overtook him, steadily increasing his advantage. This move caused the lead pack to disintegrate. By the 29K point, Tola held a seven-second lead over Emile Cairess, the nearest pursuer. After a water station near the hill's summit, Tola commenced the descent, reaching the 30-kilometer mark with an 11-second lead over Cairess. Geleta, Abdi, and Akasaki followed.

With the steep descent, the order shifted again. Geleta overtook Cairess, while Akasaki moved ahead of Abdi. Simbu, capitalizing on the descent, surpassed all three. Geleta responded by reclaiming his position ahead of Simbu. By the time they reached the base near the 33-kilometer mark, Tola maintained a 13-second lead. The group behind him consolidated, with Tebello Ramakongoana and Benson Kipruto making significant gains to join the chasers.

With 5K remaining, Geleta, Abdi, and Kipruto formed a distinct chase group, distancing themselves from Akasaki. Tola extended his lead to 27 seconds. Shortly thereafter, Kipruto began to lose contact with the other chasers. In the final kilometer, Abdi reduced the gap to 17 seconds. Tola finished with the time 2:06:26 and narrowly break the Olympic record set by Samuel Wanjiru of Kenya at the 2008 Beijing Olympic Games. 21 seconds later, Abdi finished for silver 13 seconds ahead of Kipruto. Japan was the first country to get three across the finish line, ahead of Ethiopia and Italy.

== Background ==
The men's marathon has been present on the Olympic athletics programme since the inaugural edition in 1896, making this the 30th appearance of the event.

== Course ==
The marathon course began at the Hôtel de Ville and traversed many of the host city's most iconic landmarks such as the Eiffel Tower and the Louvre before concluding at Les Invalides. Paris officials have stated the route has taken inspiration from the Women's March on Versailles. The route was characterized by significant elevation changes, totaling approximately 436 meters of ascent and 438 meters of descent, with gradients reaching up to 13.5%. Due to the elevation profile, the course has been discussed as one of the more challenging Olympic marathons. Notably, for the first time in Olympic history, the public had the opportunity to run the marathon course. Following the Olympic marathon, up to 40,000 runners will be able to participate in a public marathon or a 10k race.

== Records ==
Prior to this competition, the existing world, Olympic, and area records were as follows.

Global records before the 2024 Summer Olympics
Record	Athlete (Nation)	Time	Location	Date
World record	Kelvin Kiptum (KEN)	2:00:35	Chicago, United States	8 October 2023
Olympic record	Samuel Wanjiru (KEN)	2:06:32	Beijing, China	24 August 2008
World leading	Benson Kipruto (KEN)	2:02:16	Tokyo, Japan	3 March 2024

Area records before the 2024 Summer Olympics
Africa (records)	Kelvin Kiptum (KEN)	2:00:35 WR
Asia (records)	El Hassan El Abbassi (BHR)	2:04:43
Europe (records)	Bashir Abdi (BEL)	2:03:36
North, Central America and Caribbean (records)	Cameron Levins (CAN)	2:05:36
Oceania (records)	Brett Robinson (AUS)	2:07:31
South America (records)	Daniel do Nascimento (BRA)	2:04:51

== Qualification ==
In order to comply with the 80-athlete capacity imposed by the IOC, World Athletics debuted a new qualification system ahead of the Paris games. Each country is eligible to send three athletes to compete in the marathon; however, each spot must be "unlocked" in one of three ways between 6 November 2022 to 30 April 2024. To unlock guaranteed spots for their country, athletes must run under a 2:08:10 in an eligible race within the time period. Athletes may also unlock a spot for their country by placing top five at a World Athletics platinum-level race or by reaching a high-enough World Athletics rankings. The world rankings were used to fill any entries not allocated to time-unlocked spots. Once spots have been unlocked for a country, the National Olympic Federation can select athletes to fill their spots as they see fit. While any athlete can be assigned to an unlocked spot, they must have run at least the Quota Reallocation Time of 2:11:30.

National Olympic Federations could also use a universality spot in the marathon. Any country with no qualified athlete was allowed to enter their best-ranked runner in the marathon regardless of qualification standards.

The qualification period for the 2024 Olympic Marathon ended on 30 April 2024 and exceeded the 80-athlete target by one entry.

Qualification standard	No. of athletes	NOC	Nominated athletes
Entry standard – 2:08:10	3	Belgium	Bashir Abdi; Koen Naert; Michael Somers
Entry standard – 2:08:10	3	China	He Jie; Wu Xiangdong; Yang Shaohui
Entry standard – 2:08:10	3	Eritrea	Samsom Amare; Berhane Tesfay; Kibrom Weldemicael
Entry standard – 2:08:10	3	Ethiopia	Kenenisa Bekele; Deresa Geleta; Sisay Lemma
Entry standard – 2:08:10	3	France	Morhad Amdouni; Felix Bour; Nicolas Navarro
Entry standard – 2:08:10	3	Germany	Samuel Fitwi; Amanal Petros; Richard Ringer
Entry standard – 2:08:10	3	Great Britain	Emile Cairess; Mahamed Mahamed; Philip Sesemann
Entry standard – 2:08:10	3	Israel	Maru Teferi; Gashau Ayale; Girmaw Amare
Entry standard – 2:08:10	3	Italy	Yemaneberhan Crippa; Eyob Faniel; Daniele Meucci
Entry standard – 2:08:10	3	Kenya	Eliud Kipchoge; Benson Kipruto; Alexander Mutiso
Entry standard – 2:08:10	3	Morocco	Othmane El Goumri; Mohcin Outalha; Zouhair Talbi
Entry standard – 2:08:10	3	Spain	Ibrahim Chakir; Tariku Novales; Yago Rojo
Entry standard – 2:08:10	3	Uganda	Victor Kiplangat; Stephen Kissa; Andrew Rotich Kwemoi
Entry standard – 2:08:10	2	Australia	Brett Robinson; Patrick Tiernan
Entry standard – 2:08:10	2	Canada	Cameron Levins; Rory Linkletter
Entry standard – 2:08:10	2	Japan	Naoki Koyama; Suguru Osako
Entry standard – 2:08:10	2	Netherlands	Khalid Choukoud; Abdi Nageeye
Entry standard – 2:08:10	2	Norway	Zerei Kbrom Mezngi; Sondre Nordstad Moen
Entry standard – 2:08:10	2	Switzerland	Tadesse Abraham; Matthias Kyburz
Entry standard – 2:08:10	2	Tanzania	Gabriel Geay; Alphonce Simbu
Entry standard – 2:08:10	2	United States	Conner Mantz; Clayton Young
Entry standard – 2:08:10	0	Bahrain	~~Marius Kimutai~~ (Note: Currently serving a 3-year ban for a positive doping result. Quota place can be reallocated to another athlete by the NOC, provided that the athlete has achieved a time of at least 2:11:30 during the qualification period.)
Entry standard – 2:08:10	1	Bolivia	Héctor Garibay
Entry standard – 2:08:10	0	Brazil	~~Daniel Ferreira do Nascimento~~ (Note: Currently provisionally suspended for a doping adverse result. Quota place can be reallocated to another athlete by the NOC, provided that the athlete has achieved a time of at least 2:11:30 during the qualification period.)
Entry standard – 2:08:10	1	Chile	Carlos Díaz
Entry standard – 2:08:10	1	Djibouti	Bouh Ibrahim
Entry standard – 2:08:10	1	Guatemala	Alberto González Mindez
Entry standard – 2:08:10	1	Lesotho	Tebello Ramakongoana
Entry standard – 2:08:10	1	Peru	Cristhian Pacheco
Entry standard – 2:08:10	1	Portugal	Samuel Barata
Entry standard – 2:08:10	1	South Africa	Stephen Mokoka
Entry standard – 2:08:10	1	Sweden	Suldan Hassan
Entry standard – 2:08:10	1	Turkey	Kaan Kigen Özbilen
Entry standard – 2:08:10	1	Uzbekistan	Shokhrukh Davlatov
Entry standard – 2:08:10	1	Zimbabwe	Isaac Mpofu
World Athletics Rankings	1	Australia	Liam Adams
World Athletics Rankings	1	Chile	Hugo Catrileo
World Athletics Rankings	1	Japan	Akira Akasaki
World Athletics Rankings	1	South Africa	Elroy Gelant
World Athletics Rankings	1	United States	Leonard Korir
Universality Places	1	Cape Verde	Samuel Freire
Universality Places	1	Chad	Valentin Betoudji
Universality Places	1	Jordan	Mo'ath Alkhawaldeh
Universality Places	1	Mongolia	Bat-Ochir Ser-Od
Universality Places	1	North Korea	Han Il-ryong
Universality Places	1	North Macedonia	Dario Ivanovski
Universality Places	1	Sudan	Yaseen Abdalla
Universality Places	1	Virgin Islands	Eduardo Garcia
Invitational places	1	Refugee Olympic Team	Tachlowini Gabriyesos
Total	81		

== Results ==
The event was held on 10 August, starting at 08:00 (UTC+2) in the morning.

Rank	Athlete	Nation	Time	Time Behind	Notes
1st place, gold medalist(s)	Tamirat Tola	Ethiopia	2:06:26		OR
2nd place, silver medalist(s)	Bashir Abdi	Belgium	2:06:47	+0:21	SB
3rd place, bronze medalist(s)	Benson Kipruto	Kenya	2:07:00	+0:34	
4	Emile Cairess	Great Britain	2:07:29	+1:03	
5	Deresa Geleta	Ethiopia	2:07:31	+1:05	
6	Akira Akasaki	Japan	2:07:32	+1:06	PB
7	Tebello Ramakongoana	Lesotho	2:07:58	+1:32	NR
8	Conner Mantz	United States	2:08:12	+1:46	SB
9	Clayton Young	United States	2:08:44	+2:18	SB
10	Samsom Amare	Eritrea	2:08:56	+2:30	SB
11	Elroy Gelant	South Africa	2:09:07	+2:41	
12	Richard Ringer	Germany	2:09:18	+2:52	SB
13	Suguru Osako	Japan	2:09:25	+2:59	SB
14	Bouh Ibrahim	Djibouti	2:09:31	+3:05	SB
15	Samuel Fitwi Sibhatu	Germany	2:09:50	+3:24	
16	Nicolas Navarro	France	2:09:56	+3:30	SB
17	Alphonce Simbu	Tanzania	2:10:03	+3:37	
18	Othmane El Goumri	Morocco	2:10:06	+3:40	
19	Isaac Mpofu	Zimbabwe	2:10:09	+3:43	SB
20	Hassan Chahdi	France	2:10:09	+3:43	
21	Alexander Mutiso Munyao	Kenya	2:10:31	+4:05	
22	Michael Somers	Belgium	2:10:32	+4:06	
23	Naoki Koyama	Japan	2:10:33	+4:07	
24	Patrick Tiernan	Australia	2:10:34	+4:08	
25	Yemaneberhan Crippa	Italy	2:10:36	+4:10	
26	Maru Teferi	Israel	2:10:42	+4:16	SB
27	Stephen Mokoka	South Africa	2:10:59	+4:33	
28	Suldan Hassan	Sweden	2:11:21	+4:55	
29	Han Il-ryong	North Korea	2:11:21	+4:55	
30	Matthias Kyburz	Switzerland	2:11:32	+5:06	
31	Gashau Ayale	Israel	2:11:36	+5:10	
32	Sondre Nordstad Moen	Norway	2:11:39	+5:13	SB
33	Yaseen Abdalla	Sudan	2:11:41	+5:15	NR
34	Ibrahim Chakir	Spain	2:11:44	+5:18	
35	Zouhair Talbi	Morocco	2:11:51	+5:25	
36	Cameron Levins	Canada	2:11:56	+5:30	SB
37	Victor Kiplangat	Uganda	2:11:59	+5:33	
38	Tadesse Abraham	Switzerland	2:12:22	+5:56	
39	Kenenisa Bekele	Ethiopia	2:12:24	+5:58	
40	Wu Xiangdong	China	2:12:34	+6:08	
41	Yago Rojo	Spain	2:12:43	+6:17	SB
42	Tachlowini Gabriyesos	Refugee Olympic Team	2:12:47	+6:21	
43	Eyob Faniel	Italy	2:12:50	+6:24	
44	Girmaw Amare	Israel	2:12:51	+6:25	SB
45	Andrew Buchanan	Australia	2:12:58	+6:32	
46	Philip Sesemann	Great Britain	2:13:08	+6:42	
47	Rory Linkletter	Canada	2:13:09	+6:43	
48	Samuel Barata	Portugal	2:13:23	+6:57	SB
49	Liam Adams	Australia	2:13:33	+7:07	SB
50	Felix Bour	France	2:13:46	+7:20	SB
51	Daniele Meucci	Italy	2:14:02	+7:36	
52	Zerei Kbrom Mezngi	Norway	2:14:14	+7:48	SB
53	Carlos Díaz	Chile	2:14:25	+7:59	
54	Henok Tesfay	Eritrea	2:14:31	+8:05	
55	Yang Shaohui	China	2:14:48	+8:22	
56	Samuel Freire	Cape Verde	2:15:05	+8:39	
57	Mahamed Mahamed	Great Britain	2:15:19	+8:53	
58	Khalid Choukoud	Netherlands	2:15:25	+8:59	SB
59	Hugo Catrileo	Chile	2:15:44	+9:18	
60	Héctor Garibay	Bolivia	2:15:54	+9:28	SB
61	Koen Naert	Belgium	2:16:33	+10:07	SB
62	Andrew Rotich Kwemoi	Uganda	2:17:28	+11:02	
63	Leonard Korir	United States	2:18:45	+12:19	
64	Berhane Tesfay	Eritrea	2:18:50	+12:24	
65	Mo'ath Alkhawaldeh	Jordan	2:20:01	+13:35	SB
66	Alberto González Mindez	Guatemala	2:22:12	+15:46	SB
67	He Jie	China	2:22:31	+16:05	
68	Tariku Novales	Spain	2:25:50	+19:24	SB
69	Dario Ivanovski	North Macedonia	2:28:15	+21:49	
70	Valentin Betoudji	Chad	2:32:11	+25:45	
71	Bat-Ochiryn Ser-Od	Mongolia	2:42:33	+36:07	
—	Abdi Nageeye	Netherlands	–	40 km	DNF
—	Mohcin Outalha	Morocco	–	35 km	DNF
—	Gabriel Gerald Geay	Tanzania	–	30 km	DNF
—	Eliud Kipchoge	Kenya	–	30 km	DNF
—	Shokhrukh Davlatov	Uzbekistan	–	30 km	DNF
—	Amanal Petros	Germany	–	30 km	DNF
—	Stephen Kissa	Uganda	–	25 km	DNF
—	Kaan Kigen Özbilen	Turkey	–	Half	DNF
—	Cristhian Pacheco	Peru	–	15 km	DNF
—	Eduardo Garcia	Virgin Islands	–	5 km	DNF
