= Andrew Rotich Kwemoi =

Ugandan long-distance runner

Personal information
- Born: 1 September 2000 (age 26)

Sport
- Country: Uganda
- Sport: Long-distance running
- Events: 5000 m, 10,000 m, Half marathon, Marathon

Achievements and titles
- Personal bests: 5000 m: 13:54.44 (Kampala 2019); 10,000 m: 28:33.5 (Kampala 2023); Road; 10 km: 28:06 (Abu Dhabi 2019); 15 km: 44:43 (São Paulo 2022); Half marathon: 59:37 (Lille 2022); Marathon: 2:07:14 (Milan 2023)

Andrew Rotich Kwemoi (born 1 September 2000) is a Ugandan long-distance runner who represented Uganda at the 2024 Olympics in the Marathon.

== Career ==
In 2022 at the half marathon distance he won the Lille Half Marathon and placed second at the Bogotá Half Marathon on top of winning the Saint Silvester Road Race 15k road race in São Paulo.

In 2023 he opened the year winning the Milano City Marathon and then won the Ugandan Championships at the 10,000 m. He was selected to compete for Uganda at the 2023 World Athletics Championships in Budapest although he did not end up finishing the race. He followed this by competing at the 2023 World Athletics Road Running Championships in Riga where he placed 21st at the half marathon distance.

In 2024 Kwemoi placed 3rd at the Milano City Marathon and was selected to represent Uganda at 2024 Olympics in Paris in the marathon and he finished 62nd. He finished the year placing 3rd in the Malaga Marathon.
