= 2024 World Athletics Label Road Races =

List of notable road running competitions

2024 World Athletics Label Road Races
Map of Platinum (blue), Platinum+Gold (red) and Gold (black)-level races only

The 2024 World Athletics Label Road Races were road running competitions held in 2024 that have met the standard for World Athletics to include the race in its Label Road Races program. Like the Diamond League for track and field, the list represents the highest level international road racing circuit. The list contained 303 races, over 60 more than in 2023, and included 16 Platinum Label, 45 Gold Label, 65 Elite Label, and 177 Label races.

== Races ==
Date	Meeting	Venue	Country
Platinum (16)
7 Jan	C&D XiaMen Marathon	Xiamen	China
28 Jan	Osaka Women's Marathon	Osaka	Japan
25 Feb	Medio Maratón Internacional Guadalajara Electrolit Nutrido Por Granvita	Guadalajara	Mexico
3 Mar	Tokyo Marathon	Tokyo	Japan
10 Mar	Nagoya Women's Marathon	Nagoya	Japan
17 Mar	Seoul International Marathon	Seoul	South Korea
15 Apr	Boston Marathon	Boston	United States
21 Apr	TCS London Marathon	London	Great Britain
15 Sep	Sydney Marathon	Sydney	Australia
29 Sep	BMW Berlin Marathon	Berlin	Germany
13 Oct	Bank of America Chicago Marathon	Chicago	United States
20 Oct	TCS Amsterdam Marathon	Amsterdam	Netherlands
3 Nov	TCS New York City Marathon	New York	United States
1 Dec	Maratón Valencia Trinidad Alfonso Zurich	Valencia	Spain
1 Dec	Shanghai Marathon	Shanghai	China
15 Dec	Bangsaen21 Half Marathon	Chon Buri	Thailand
Gold (45)
14 Jan	Aramco Houston Half Marathon	Houston	United States
14 Jan	Chevron Houston Marathon	Houston	United States
21 Jan	Standard Chartered Hong Kong Marathon	Hong Kong	Hong Kong
21 Jan	Tata Mumbai Marathon	Mumbai	India
27 Jan	Buriram Marathon Presented by Chang Mineral Water	Buri Ram	Thailand
10 Feb	Access Bank Lagos City Marathon	Lagos	Nigeria
11 Feb	eDreams Mitja Marató Barcelona by Brooks	Barcelona	Spain
16 Feb	Doha Marathon by Ooredoo	Doha	Qatar
24 Feb	Ras Al Khaimah Half Marathon	Ras Al Khaimah	United Arab Emirates
25 Feb	Meishan Renshou Half Marathon	Meishan	China
25 Feb	Osaka Marathon	Osaka	Japan
10 Mar	Zurich Marató Barcelona	Barcelona	Spain
17 Mar	New Taipei City Wan Jin Shi Marathon	New Taipei City	Taiwan
24 Mar	Chang'an Automobile Chongqing Marathon	Chongqing	China
24 Mar	Wuxi Marathon	Wuxi	China
31 Mar	Yangzhou Jianzhen Half Marathon	Yangzhou	China
7 Apr	Daegu Marathon	Daegu	South Korea
14 Apr	NN Marathon Rotterdam	Rotterdam	Netherlands
21 Apr	Shanghai Half Marathon	Shanghai	China
28 Apr	Gifu Half Marathon	Gifu	Japan
28 Apr	Tata Consultancy Services World 10K Bengaluru	Bengaluru	India
28 Apr	Türkiye İş Bankası Istanbul Half Marathon	Istanbul	Turkey
25 May	Okpekpe 10 km Road Race	Okpekpe	Nigeria
26 May	Lanzhou Marathon	Lanzhou	China
23 Jun	10KM Port Gentil	Port Gentil	Gabon
25 Aug	Mexico City Marathon Telcel	Mexico City	Mexico
15 Sep	Copenhagen Half Marathon	Copenhagen	Denmark
22 Sep	Hengshui Lake Marathon	Hengshui	China
22 Sep	Taiyuan Marathon	Taiyuan	China
20 Oct	Changsha Marathon	Changsha	China
20 Oct	Ljubljana Marathon	Ljubljana	Slovenia
20 Oct	Vedanta Delhi Half Marathon	New Delhi	India
20 Oct	Yellow River Estuary Dongying Marathon	Dongyin	China
27 Oct	BEIKE Beijing Marathon	Beijing	China
27 Oct	Chengdu Marathon	Chengdu	China
27 Oct	Medio Maratón Valencia Trinidad Alfonso Zurich	Valencia	Spain
27 Oct	Shanghai 10K Elite Race	Shanghai	China
3 Nov	Hangzhou marathon	Hangzhou	China
3 Nov	Türkiye iş Bankasi Istanbul Marathon	Istanbul	Turkey
1 Dec	Shenzhen Marathon	Shenzhen	China
1 Dec	Standard Chartered Singapore Marathon	Singapore	Singapore
8 Dec	Guangzhou Marathon	Guangzhou	China
15 Dec	Taipei Marathon	Taipei	Taiwan
15 Dec	Tata Steel Kolkata World 25K	Kolkata	India
31 Dec	Nationale-Nederlanden San Silvestre Vallecana	Madrid	Spain
Elite (65)
4 Feb	Beppu-Oita Mainichi Marathon	Ōita	Japan
4 Feb	Kagawa Marugame International Half Marathon	Marugame	Japan
10 Feb	Riyadh Half Marathon	Riyadh	Saudi Arabia
10 Feb	Riyadh Marathon	Riyadh	Saudi Arabia
18 Feb	Zurich Maratón de Sevilla	Seville	Spain
17 Mar	Acea Run Rome The Marathon	Rome	Italy
17 Mar	EDP Lisbon Half Marathon	Lisbon	Portugal
24 Mar	Bank of China Wuhan Marathon	Wuhan	China
31 Mar	Xuzhou Marathon	Xuzhou	China
6 Apr	Prague Half Marathon	Prague	Czech Republic
7 Apr	Generali Berliner Halbmarathon	Berlin	Germany
7 Apr	Schneider Electric Marathon de Paris	Paris	France
21 Apr	Enschede Marathon	Enschede	Netherlands
21 Apr	Haier Qingdao Marathon	Qingdao	China
21 Apr	Vienna City Marathon	Vienna	Austria
5 May	Prague International Marathon	Prague	Czech Republic
19 May	ฺBangsaen10	Chon Buri	Thailand
26 May	Yingkou – Bayuquan Marathon	Yingkou	China
9 Jun	Kigali International Peace Marathon	Kigali	Rwanda
16 Jun	JiLin City Marathon	Jilin	China
23 Jun	Guizhou Zhenning Huangguoshu Half Marathon	Zhenning	China
28 Jul	Media Maraton de Bogota	Bogotá	Colombia
3 Aug	TD Beach to Beacon 10K Road Race	Cape Elizabeth	United States
4 Aug	China Cool City-Liupanshui Summer Marathon	Liupanshui	China
18 Aug	La Carrera del Pacifico Cali 10K	Cali	Colombia
25 Aug	Condor Executive Antrim Coast Half Marathon	Larne	Great Britain
25 Aug	Harbin Marathon	Harbin	China
25 Aug	Maybank Marathon	Bali	Indonesia
7 Sep	Birell 10K Race	Prague	Czech Republic
7 Sep	Tallinn Half Marathon	Tallinn	Estonia
8 Sep	Tallinn Marathon	Tallinn	Estonia
16 Sep	Shenyang Marathon	Shenyang	China
22 Sep	Brașov Running Festival	Brașov	Romania
6 Oct	EDP Lisbon Marathon	Lisbon	Portugal
6 Oct	Hyundai Half Marathon	Lisbon	Portugal
6 Oct	Principality Cardiff Half Marathon	Cardiff	Great Britain
20 Oct	TCS Toronto Waterfront Marathon	Toronto	Canada
27 Oct	Irish Life Dublin Marathon	Dublin	Ireland
27 Oct	Mainova Frankfurt Marathon	Frankfurt	Germany
27 Oct	Maraton Puebla	Puebla	Mexico
2 Nov	ChangZhou West Taihu Lake Half Marathon	Changzhou	China
3 Nov	Bangsaen42 Chonburi Marathon	Chon Buri	Thailand
3 Nov	Nanjing Marathon	Nanjing	China
3 Nov	Xi'an Marathon	Xi'an	China
9 Nov	Xichang Qionghai Wetland International Marathon	Xichang	China
10 Nov	Hefei Marathon	Hefei	China
10 Nov	Nanchang Marathon	Nanchang	China
17 Nov	Shaoxing Marathon	Shaoxing	China
17 Nov	Nanjing Marathon	Nanjing	China
17 Nov	Standard Chartered X Hong Kong International Marathon 10km	Hong Kong	Hong Kong
24 Nov	Chizhou Marathon	Chizhou	China
1 Dec	Hofu Yomiuri Marathon	Hōfu	Japan
1 Dec	Fukuoka Marathon	Fukuoka	Japan
1 Dec	Suzhou Taihu Marathon	Suzhou	China
7 Dec	Kalākaua Merrie Mile	Honolulu	United States
8 Dec	Honolulu Marathon	Honolulu	United States
8 Dec	Huangshi Cihu Half Marathon	Huangshi	China
14 Dec	Abu Dhabi Marathon	Abu Dhabi	United Arab Emirates
14 Dec	Al Sharqiyah International 5KM	Al Khobar	Saudi Arabia
14 Dec	Al Sharqiyah International Half Marathon	Al Khobar	Saudi Arabia
15 Dec	İnternational Mersin Marathon	Mersin	Turkey
15 Dec	Fuzhou Marathon	Fuzhou	China
22 Dec	Guangzhou Huangpu Marathon	Guangzhou	China
22 Dec	Shantou Marathon	Shantou	China
29 Dec	SCO Kunming Marathon	Kunming	China
Label (177)
7 Jan	Dubai Marathon	Dubai	United Arab Emirates
14 Jan	10K Valencia Ibercaja	Valencia	Spain
21 Jan	Mitja Marató Internacional Vila de Santa Pola	Santa Pola	Spain
28 Jan	10K Ibiza – Platja d'en Bossa	Ibiza	Spain
28 Jan	Marrakesh International Marathon	Marrakesh	Morocco
28 Jan	Medio Maraton Sevilla	Seville	Spain
11 Feb	MONACO RUN 5 km	Monaco	Monaco
25 Feb	10K Facsa Castellón	Castellón de la Plana	Spain
25 Feb	Maratón BP Castellón	Castellón de la Plana	Spain
25 Feb	Napoli City Half Marathon	Naples	Italy
3 Mar	Harmonie Mutuelle Semi de Paris	Paris	France
3 Mar	RomaOstia Half Marathon	Rome	Italy
10 Mar	Nanjing Pukou Marathon	Nanjing	China
10 Mar	Suzhou Jinji Lake Half Marathon	Suzhou	China
10 Mar	TotalEnergies Medio Maratón de Málaga	Málaga	Spain
16 Mar	10 km Villa de Laredo	Laredo	Spain
16 Mar	Podium Festival	Leicester	Great Britain
17 Mar	GuilIn Marathon	Guilin	China
17 Mar	United Airlines NYC Half	New York	United States
23 Mar	Azkoitia-Azpeitia International Half Marathon Diego Garcia Memorial	Azpeitia	Spain
24 Mar	Warsaw Half Marathon	Warsaw	Poland
24 Mar	Cheshire Elite 10k	Pulford	Great Britain
24 Mar	ZAGREB21 – Zagreb Spring Half Marathon	Zagreb	Croatia
30 Mar	Cursa Patrimoni Eivissa 10K	Ibiza	Spain
31 Mar	Shijiazhuang Marathon	Shijiazhuang	China
31 Mar	Zheng-kai Marathon	Zhengzhou	China
7 Apr	Maratona International de São Paulo	São Paulo	Brazil
7 Apr	ČSOB Bratislava Marathon	Bratislava	Slovakia
7 Apr	Milano Marathon	Milan	Italy
7 Apr	Movistar Madrid Medio Maratón	Madrid	Spain
13 Apr	B.A.A. 5K	Boston	United States
13 Apr	B.A.A. Invitational Mile	Boston	United States
14 Apr	ADAC Marathon Hannover	Hanover	Germany
14 Apr	Beijing Half Marathon	Beijing	China
14 Apr	Gunsan Saemangeum International Marathon	Gunsan	South Korea
14 Apr	Yangling Marathon	Yangling	China
21 Apr	Hangzhou Qiantang Women's Half Marathon	Hangzhou	China
21 Apr	Huai'an Marathon	Huai'an	China
21 Apr	Izmir Marathon	İzmir	Turkey
21 Apr	Marathon International De Rabat	Rabat	Morocco
21 Apr	Nanjing Xianlin Half Marathon	Nanjing	China
21 Apr	Shaoxing Shangyu Cao'e River Half Marathon	Shaoxing	China
21 Apr	Tashkent International Marathon	Tashkent	Uzbekistan
28 Apr	Comtrade Belgrade Marathon	Belgrade	Serbia
28 Apr	Durban International Marathon	Durban	South Africa
28 Apr	Maratona da Europa	Aveiro	Portugal
28 Apr	New Balance 42k Porto Alegre	Porto Alegre	Brazil
28 Apr	Zurich Rock 'n' Roll Running Series Madrid	Madrid	Spain
28 Apr	Zurich Rock 'n' Roll Running Series Madrid Marathon	Madrid	Spain
1 May	XXVII-th Oderzo Citta Archeologica - International Road Race	Oderzo	Italy
4 May	Issyk-Kul SCO Run the Silk Road Marathon	Cholpon-Ata	Kyrgyzstan
5 May	Copenhagen Marathon	Copenhagen	Denmark
5 May	Generali Genève Marathon	Geneva	Switzerland
5 May	Gutenberg Halbmarathon Mainz	Mainz	Germany
5 May	Moy Park Belfast City Marathon	Belfast	Great Britain
5 May	Rio City Half Marathon	Rio de Janeiro	Brazil
5 May	UPMC Health Plan Pittsburgh Half Marathon	Pittsburgh	United States
12 May	Dawei Half Eco-Marathon	Dawei	China
12 May	OMV Petrom Bucharest Half Marathon	Bucharest	Romania
18 May	Mattoni Karlovy Vary Half Marathon	Karlovy Vary	Czech Republic
18 May	Rimi Riga Marathon DPD Mile	Riga	Latvia
19 May	HBF Run for a Reason	Perth	Australia
19 May	Lima Marathon	Lima	Peru
19 May	Rimi Riga 10km	Riga	Latvia
19 May	Rimi Riga 5km	Riga	Latvia
19 May	Rimi Riga Half Marathon	Riga	Latvia
19 May	Rimi Riga Marathon	Riga	Latvia
26 May	Miyun Eco Marathon	Beijing	China
26 May	Scenic Half Marathon Chanthaburi	Chanthaburi	Thailand
26 May	Tartan Ottawa International Marathon	Ottawa	Canada
27 May	Bolderboulder	Boulder	United States
1 Jun	adidas Stockholm Marathon	Stockholm	Sweden
1 Jun	Mattoni České Budějovice Half Marathon	České Budějovice	Czech Republic
2 Jun	McGrath Launceston Running Festival – Think Big Half Marathon	Launceston	Australia
2 Jun	Madrid Vintage Run by Total Energies	Madrid	Spain
2 Jun	Maratona da Cidade do Rio de Janeiro	Rio de Janeiro	Brazil
8 Jun	Mastercard New York Mini 10K – Women's Race	New York	United States
9 Jun	Bank of America Chicago 13.1	Chicago	United States
14 Jun	Karlovački cener 10K – Karlovac 10K	Karlovac	Croatia
15 Jun	Corrida Internationale de Langueux	Langueux	France
15 Jun	Mattoni Olomouc Half Marathon	Olomouc	Czech Republic
16 Jun	Guiyang Marathon	Guiyang	China
16 Jun	Run Nation Bamburgh 10k	Bamburgh	Great Britain
16 Jun	TELESIA 10K – International 10 km Road Race	Telese Terme	Italy
23 Jun	B.A.A. 10K	Boston	United States
23 Jun	BTN Jakarta International Marathon	Jakarta	Indonesia
29 Jun	BCR Bucharest 10K GRAND PRIX	Bucharest	Romania
30 Jun	hella Hamburg Half Marathon	Hamburg	Germany
4 Jul	Atlanta Journal Constitution Peachtree Road Race	Atlanta	United States
6 Jul	Gold Coast Half Marathon	Gold Coast	Australia
7 Jul	ASICS Gold Coast Marathon	Gold Coast	Australia
20 Jul	Amazing Thailand Pattaya 10K Presented by MAMA	Pattaya	Thailand
21 Jul	Amazing Thailand Pattaya Half Marathon Presented by MAMA	Pattaya	Thailand
21 Jul	Amazing Thailand Pattaya Marathon Presented by MAMA	Pattaya	Thailand
26 Jul	Giro Podistico di Castelbuono	Castelbuono	Italy
28 Jul	SP City Marathon	São Paulo	Brazil
4 Aug	Yala Marathon	Yala	Thailand
11 Aug	Sunshine Coast Marathon Festival	Sunshine Coast	Australia
18 Aug	ASICS Falmouth Road Race	Falmouth	United States
25 Aug	21k Buenos Aires	Buenos Aires	Argentina
25 Aug	Hokkaido Marathon	Sapporo	Japan
25 Aug	Lima Half Marathon	Lima	Peru
25 Aug	NMDC Hyderabad Marathon	Hyderabad	India
25 Aug	Songkhla International Marathon	Songkhla	Thailand
7 Sep	Night Praski Half Warsaw Marathon	Warsaw	Poland
7 Sep	Ramboll Stockholm Half Marathon	Stockholm	Sweden
8 Sep	Great North Run	South Shields	Great Britain
8 Sep	Izmir Half Marathon	İzmir	Turkey
8 Sep	5th Avenue Mile	New York	United States
8 Sep	Rimi Vilnius Marathon	Vilnius	Lithuania
14 Sep	Brose Night Run Prievidza	Prievidza	Slovakia
15 Sep	Hyundai Porto Half Marathon	Porto	Portugal
15 Sep	Scenic Half Marathon	Krabi	Thailand
21 Sep	European Road Mile	Brașov	Romania
22 Sep	Buenos Aires International Marathon	Buenos Aires	Argentina
22 Sep	Kunming Plateau Half Marathon	Kunming	China
22 Sep	Mattoni Ústí nad Labem Half Marathon	Ústí nad Labem	Czech Republic
22 Sep	Moy Park Belfast City Half Marathon	Belfast	Great Britain
29 Sep	Nationale-Nederlanden Warsaw Marathon	Warsaw	Poland
29 Sep	Maratona Internacional de Porto Alegre	Porto Alegre	Brazil
6 Oct	Kosice Peace Marathon	Košice	Slovakia
6 Oct	Kuala Lumpur Standard Chartered Marathon	Kuala Lumpur	Malaysia
6 Oct	TELESIA 21K – International Half Marathon	Telese Terme	Italy
6 Oct	Wipro Bengaluru Marathon	Bengaluru	India
12 Oct	Milla Internacional de Berango	Berango	Spain
13 Oct	Zagreb Marathon	Zagreb	Croatia
13 Oct	Raiffeisen Bank Bucharest Marathon	Bucharest	Romania
13 Oct	Runkara International Half Marathon	Ankara	Turkey
13 Oct	VREDESTEIN 20 km de Paris	Paris	France
13 Oct	Wizz Air Sofia Marathon	Sofia	Bulgaria
19 Oct	Total Energies Bilbao Night Half Marathon	Bilbao	Spain
20 Oct	Mae Moh Half Marathon	Lampang	Thailand
20 Oct	Sanlam Cape Town Marathon	Cape Town	South Africa
20 Oct	Wizz Air Rome Half Marathon	Rome	Italy
27 Oct	Casablanca International Marathon	Casablanca	Morocco
27 Oct	Standard Chartered Nairobi Marathon	Nairobi	Kenya
27 Oct	Venicemarathon	Venice	Italy
2 Nov	Abbot Dash to the Finish Line 5K	New York	United States
3 Nov	EDP Porto Marathon	Porto	Portugal
3 Nov	Gaochun Cittaslow Marathon	Nanjing	China
3 Nov	Round Lihu Lake Half Marathon	Wuxi	China
3 Nov	Yichang Marathon	Yichang	China
10 Nov	Athens Marathon	Athens	Greece
10 Nov	B.A.A. Half Marathon	Boston	United States
10 Nov	Beijing Tongzhou Canal Half Marathon	Beijing	China
10 Nov	Korat Marathon Presented by The Mall	Nakhon Ratchasima	Thailand
10 Nov	Ravenna Marathon	Ravenna	Italy
17 Nov	21K Nuevo Leon	Monterrey	Mexico
17 Nov	Changde Liuye Lake Marathon	Changde	China
17 Nov	Great Ethiopian Run 10km	Addis Ababa	Ethiopia
17 Nov	Kobe Marathon	Kobe	Japan
17 Nov	Yiwu Half Marathon	Yiwu	China
24 Nov	Betong 21	Yala	Thailand
24 Nov	China-ASEAN International Marathon	Fangchenggang	China
24 Nov	Quzhou Marathon	Quzhou	China
24 Nov	Maratón Internacional Guadalajara Hidratado por Electrolit	Guadalajara	Mexico
24 Nov	Zhoushan Islands Marathon	Zhoushan	China
28 Nov	Manchester Road Race	Manchester	United States
1 Dec	Amazing Thailand 10K Bangkok Presented by Toyota	Bangkok	Thailand
1 Dec	Amazing Thailand Half Marathon Bangkok Presented by Toyota	Bangkok	Thailand
1 Dec	Amazing Thailand Marathon Bangkok Presented by Toyota	Bangkok	Thailand
1 Dec	Jinjiang Marathon	Jinjiang	China
1 Dec	Borobudur Marathon	Borobudur	Indonesia
1 Dec	Marathon COMAR de Tunis-Carthage	Tunis	Tunisia
1 Dec	Xiamen Haicang Half Marathon	Xiamen	China
7 Dec	Sao Silvestre - Sobral de Monte Agraco	Sobral de Monte Agraco	Portugal
8 Dec	Course de l'Escalade	Geneva	Switzerland
8 Dec	IndianOil WNC Navy Half Marathon	Mumbai	India
15 Dec	Bajaj Allianz Pune Half Marathon	Pune	India
15 Dec	Generali Maratón de Málaga	Málaga	Spain
15 Dec	Hainan Danzhou Marathon	Danzhou	China
15 Dec	Shenzhen Nanshan Half Marathon	Shenzhen	China
22 Dec	Bangkok Midnight Half Marathon	Bangkok	Thailand
29 Dec	Hainan Marathon	Sanya	China
31 Dec	99 Corrida de Sao Silvestre	Sao Paulo	Brazil
31 Dec	BOclassic Alto Adige	Bolzano	Italy
31 Dec	Cursa dels Nassos	Barcelona	Spain

== See also ==
- World Athletics Label Road Races
- World Marathon Majors
- World Athletics Label marathon races
