= List of World Athletics Label marathon races =

This is a worldwide list of World Athletics Label Road Races marathon runs.

== Legend ==
Symbol/Column	Description
**Bold**	Bold faced races are included in the World Marathon Majors
	Platinum
	Gold
	Elite
	Label

== Race list ==
=== Platinum ===
Name	City / Race Location	Country	Month* _{*Last race was held}	Inception	Ref
Amsterdam Marathon	Amsterdam	Netherlands	October	1975	
**Berlin Marathon**	Berlin	Germany	September	1974	
**Boston Marathon**	Boston	United States	April	1897	
**Chicago Marathon**	Chicago	United States	October	1977	
**London Marathon**	London	England	April	1981	
Nagoya Women's Marathon	Nagoya	Japan	March	1980	
**New York City Marathon**	New York City	United States	November	1970	
Osaka Women's Marathon	Osaka	Japan	January	1982	
Seoul International Marathon	Seoul	South Korea	March	1931	
Shanghai Marathon	Shanghai	China	December	2000	
**Sydney Marathon**	Sydney	Australia	September	2001	
**Tokyo Marathon**	Tokyo	Japan	February	1981	
Valencia Marathon	Valencia	Spain	December	1981	
Xiamen Marathon	Xiamen	China	January	2003	

=== Gold ===
Name	City / Race Location	Country	Month* _{*Last race was held}	Inception	Ref
Abu Dhabi Marathon	Abu Dhabi	United Arab Emirates	December	2018	
Barcelona Marathon	Barcelona	Spain	March	1978	
Beijing Marathon	Beijing	China	October	1981	
Buriram Marathon	Buriram	Thailand	January	2017	
Daegu Marathon	Daegu	South Korea	April	2009	
Doha Marathon	Doha	Qatar	January	2013	
Guangzhou Marathon	Guangzhou	China	December	2012	
Hangzhou International Marathon	Hangzhou	China	November	1987	
Hong Kong Marathon	Hong Kong	Hong Kong	February	1997	
Houston Marathon	Houston	United States	January	1972	
Istanbul Marathon	Istanbul	Turkey	November	1979	
Lagos City Marathon	Lagos	Nigeria	January	2016	
Ljubljana Marathon	Ljubljana	Slovenia	October	1996	
Mexico City Marathon	Mexico City	Mexico	August	1983	
Mumbai Marathon	Mumbai	India	January	2004	
New Taipei City Wan Jin Shi Marathon	New Taipei City	Taiwan	March	1979	
Osaka Marathon	Osaka	Japan	February	2011	
Rotterdam Marathon	Rotterdam	Netherlands	April	1981	
Singapore Marathon	Singapore	Singapore	December	1982	
Taipei Marathon	Taipei	Taiwan	December	2002	
Taiyuan Marathon	Taiyuan	China	September	2009	

=== Elite/Label ===
Name	City / Race Location	Country	Month* _{*Last race was held}	Inception	Ref
Athens Marathon	Athens	Greece	November	1972	
Bali Marathon	Gianyar	Indonesia	September	2012	
Bangkok Marathon	Bangkok	Thailand	November	1987	
Bangsaen Marathon	Bang Saen	Thailand	November	2017	
Belfast Marathon	Belfast	Northern Ireland	May	1982	
Belgrade Marathon	Belgrade	Serbia	April	1988	
Bengaluru Marathon	Bengaluru	India	October	2005	
Beppu-Ōita Marathon	Beppu and Ōita	Japan	February	1952	
Bratislava Marathon	Bratislava	Slovakia	April	2006	
Bucharest Marathon	Bucharest	Romania	October	2008	
Buenos Aires Marathon	Buenos Aires	Argentina	October	1984	
Cape Town Marathon	Cape Town	South Africa	September	2007	
Castellón Marathon	Castellón	Spain	February	2010	
Copenhagen Marathon	Copenhagen	Denmark	May	1980	
Dubai Marathon	Dubai	United Arab Emirates	January	1998	
Dublin Marathon	Dublin	Ireland	October	1980	
Durban Marathon	Durban	South Africa	April	2021	
Enschede Marathon	Enschede	Netherlands	April	1991	
Frankfurt Marathon	Frankfurt	Germany	October	1981	
Fukuoka Marathon	Fukuoka	Japan	December	1947	
Geneva Marathon	Geneva	Switzerland	May	2005	
Gold Coast Marathon	Gold Coast	Australia	July	1979	
Guadalajara Marathon	Guadalajara	Mexico	October/November	1984	
Hannover Marathon	Hannover	Germany	April	1991	
Hōfu Marathon	Hofu	Japan	December	1970	
Hokkaido Marathon	Sapporo	Japan	August	1987	
Honolulu Marathon	Honolulu	United States	December	1973	
Huangpu Marathon	Huangpu	China	December	2012	
Hyderabad Marathon	Hyderabad	India	August	2011	
Issyk-Kul Marathon	Cholpon-Ata	Kyrgyzstan	May	2012	
İzmir Marathon	Izmir	Turkey	April	2020	
Jakarta Marathon	Jakarta	Indonesia	October	2013	
Kilgali International Marathon	Kilgali	Rwanda	May/June	2005	
Kobe Marathon	Kobe	Japan	November	2011	
Košice Peace Marathon	Košice	Slovakia	October	1924	
Kuala Lumpur Marathon	Kuala Lumpur	Malaysia	October	2009	
Lisbon Marathon	Lisbon	Portugal	October	1986	
Madrid Marathon	Madrid	Spain	April	1978	
Málaga Marathon	Malaga	Spain	December	2010	
Marrakesh Marathon	Marrakesh	Morocco	January	1987	
Mersin Marathon	Mersin	Turkey	December	2015	
Milan Marathon	Milan	Italy	April	2019	
Nairobi Marathon	Nairobi	Kenya	October	2003	
Nanjing Marathon	Nanjing	China	November	2015	
Ottawa Marathon	Ottawa	Canada	May	1975	
Paris Marathon	Paris	France	April	1976	
Pattaya Marathon	Pattaya	Thailand	July	1992	
Porto Marathon	Porto	Portugal	November	2004	
Prague Marathon	Prague	Czech Republic	May	1995	
Rabat Marathon	Rabat	Morocco	April	2015	
Rio de Janeiro Marathon	Rio de Janeiro	Brazil	June	1979	
Riyadh Marathon	Riyadh	Saudi Arabia	February/March	2022	
Riga Marathon	Riga	Latvia	May	1991	
Rome Marathon	Rome	Italy	April	1982	
Sao Paulo International Marathon	Sao Paulo	Brazil	April	1995	
Seville Marathon	Seville	Spain	February	1985	
Sofia Marathon	Sofia	Bulgaria	October	1983	
Stockholm Marathon	Stockholm	Sweden	June	1979	
Sunshine Coast Marathon	Sunshine Coast	Australia	August	2012	
Tallinn Marathon	Tallinn	Estonia	September	1989	
Tashkent Marathon	Tashkent	Uzbekistan	April	2019	
Tel Aviv Marathon	Tel Aviv	Israel	February	1981	
Toronto Waterfront Marathon	Toronto	Canada	October	2000	
Tunis-Carthage Marathon	Tunis	Tunisia	December	1986	
Venice Marathon	Venice	Italy	October	1986	
Vienna Marathon	Vienna	Austria	April	1984	
Vilnius Marathon	Vilnius	Lithuania	September	2004	
Warsaw Marathon	Warsaw	Poland	September/October	1979	
Zagreb Marathon	Zagreb	Croatia	October	1992	

== See also ==
- World Athletics Label Road Races
- World Marathon Majors
- List of marathon races
