= 2023 World Athletics Label Road Races =

List of notable road running competitions

The 2023 World Athletics Label Road Races are road running competitions scheduled for 2023 that have met a certain standard for World Athletics to include the race in its Label Road Races program. The list of races so labelled for the 2023 calendar year was released on 4 November 2022. The list contained 238 races, nearly 20 more than in 2022, and included 14 Platinum Label, (Note: All Platinum Label events in 2023 are marathons.) 38 Gold Label, 66 Elite Label, and 120 Label races. World Athletics stated that the additional funding afforded by the Label Road Races program would allow the Athletics Integrity Unit to improve the system it uses to detect drug use in competitions.

== Races ==
Date	Name	Location	Country	Label	Rf.
2023.01.15	10K Valencia Ibercaja	Valencia	Spain	Label	
2023.01.15	Houston Half Marathon	Houston	United States	Gold	
2023.01.15	Houston Marathon	Houston	United States	Gold	
2023.01.15	Mumbai Marathon	Mumbai	India	Gold	
2023.01.20	Doha Marathon	Doha	Qatar	Elite	
2023.01.21	Buriram Marathon	Buriram	Thailand	Elite	
2023.01.22	Santa Pola Half Marathon	Santa Pola	Spain	Label	
2023.01.29	10K Platja d'en Bossa	Ibiza	Spain	Label	
2023.01.29	Marrakech Marathon	Marrakesh	Morocco	Label	
2023.01.29	Osaka Women's Marathon	Osaka	Japan	Platinum	
2023.02.04	Lagos City Marathon	Lagos	Nigeria	Gold	
2023.02.05	Beppu-Ōita Marathon	Beppu	Japan	Elite	
2023.02.05	Kagawa Marugame Half Marathon	Marugame	Japan	Elite	
2023.02.11	Riyadh Marathon	Riyadh	Saudi Arabia	Elite	
2023.02.12	Dubai Marathon	Dubai	United Arab Emirates	Gold	
2023.02.12	Monaco Run	Monaco	Monaco	Label	
2023.02.12	Hong Kong Marathon	Hong Kong	Hong Kong	Gold	
2023.02.18	Ras Al Khaimah Half Marathon	Ras Al Khaimah	United Arab Emirates	Gold	
2023.02.19	Barcelona Half Marathon	Barcelona	Spain	Gold	
2023.02.19	Seville Marathon	Seville	Spain	Elite	
2023.02.24	Tel Aviv Marathon	Tel Aviv	Israel	Label	
2023.02.26	Breaking Barriers 50km	Gqeberha	South Africa	Elite	
2023.02.26	10K Castellón	Castellón de la Plana	Spain	Label	
2023.02.26	Castellón Marathon	Castellón de la Plana	Spain	Label	
2023.02.26	Guadalajara Half Marathon	Guadalajara	Mexico	Gold	
2023.02.26	Napoli City Half Marathon	Naples	Italy	Label	
2023.02.26	Osaka Marathon	Osaka	Japan	Gold	
2023.02.26	Atlanta Half Marathon	Atlanta	United States	Label	
2023.03.05	Roma-Ostia Half Marathon	Rome	Italy	Label	
2023.03.05	Tokyo Marathon	Tokyo	Japan	Platinum	
2023.03.12	Durban Marathon	Durban	South Africa	Label	
2023.03.12	Lisbon Half Marathon	Lisbon	Portugal	Elite	
2023.03.12	Izmir Marathon	İzmir	Turkey	Label	
2023.03.12	Nagoya Women's Marathon	Nagoya	Japan	Platinum	
2023.03.12	Ghent Half Marathon	Ghent	Belgium	Elite	
2023.03.12	Suzhou Bay Half Marathon	Suzhou	China	Label	
2023.03.12	Suzhou Jinji Lake Half Marathon	Suzhou	China	Label	
2023.03.18	Nanjing Pukou Marathon	Nanjing	China	Label	
2023.03.19	Chongqing Marathon	Chongqing	China	Gold	
2023.03.19	New Taipei City Wan Jin Shi Marathon	New Taipei City	Taiwan	Gold	
2023.03.19	Rome Marathon	Rome	Italy	Elite	
2023.03.19	Seoul International Marathon	Seoul	South Korea	Platinum	
2023.03.19	Wuxi Marathon	Wuxi	China	Gold	
2023.03.19	Barcelona Marathon	Barcelona	Spain	Gold	
2023.03.25	Azkoitia–Azpeitia Half Marathon	Azpeitia	Spain	Label	
TBD	Breaking Records 5km	Gqeberha	South Africa	Label	
2023.03.25	Atlanta Women's 5K	Atlanta	United States	Label	
2023.03.26	Hannover Marathon	Hanover	Germany	Label	
2023.03.26	Meishan Renshou Half Marathon	Meishan	China	Elite	
2023.03.26	Madrid Half Marathon	Madrid	Spain	Label	
2023.03.26	Suzhou Taihu Marathon	Suzhou	China	Elite	
2023.03.26	Zagreb 21	Zagreb	Croatia	Label	
2023.04.01	Prague Half Marathon	Prague	Czech Republic	Elite	
2023.04.02	Bratislava Marathon	Bratislava	Slovakia	Label	
2023.04.02	Daegu Marathon	Daegu	South Korea	Gold	
2023.04.02	Dawei Half Eco-Marathon	Hefei	China	Label	
2023.04.02	Milano Marathon	Milan	Italy	Label	
2023.04.02	Paris Marathon	Paris	France	Elite	
2023.04.09	Nanjing Xianlin Half Marathon	Nanjing	China	Elite	
2023.04.09	Wuhan Marathon	Wuhan	China	Elite	
2023.04.09	Yangling Marathon	Xianyang	China	Label	
2023.04.15	B.A.A. 5K	Boston	United States	Label	
2023.04.16	Changde Liuye Lake Marathon	Changde	China	Label	
2023.04.16	Enschede Marathon	Enschede	Netherlands	Label	
2023.04.16	Rotterdam Marathon	Rotterdam	Netherlands	Gold	
2023.04.16	Shanghai Half Marathon	Shanghai	China	Label	
2023.04.16	Shijiazhuang Marathon	Shijiazhuang	China	Elite	
2023.04.17	Boston Marathon	Boston	United States	Platinum	
2023.04.23	Belgrade Marathon	Belgrade	Serbia	Label	
2023.04.23	Gifu Half Marathon	Gifu	Japan	Gold	
2023.04.23	Kaunas Marathon	Kaunas	Lithuania	Label	
2023.04.23	Madrid Marathon	Madrid	Spain	Label	
2023.04.23	London Marathon	London	United Kingdom	Platinum	
2023.04.23	Vienna City Marathon	Vienna	Austria	Elite	
2023.04.30	Belfast Marathon	Belfast	United Kingdom	Label	
2023.04.30	Bozhou Marathon	Bozhou	China	Label	
2023.04.30	Istanbul Half Marathon	Istanbul	Turkey	Gold	
2023.04.30	Rabat Marathon	Rabat	Morocco	Label	
2023.04.30	Rabat Marathon	Rabat	Morocco	Label	
2023.05.28	Ottawa Race Weekend	Ottawa	Canada	Elite	
2023.08.27	Antrim Coast Half Marathon	Larne	United Kingdom	Elite	
2023.10.15	Amsterdam Marathon	Amsterdam	Netherlands	Platinum	
2023.10.15	Toronto Waterfront Marathon	Toronto	Canada	Elite	
2023.10.22	Valencia Half Marathon	Valencia	Spain	Gold	
2023.10.29	Dublin Marathon	Dublin	Ireland	Label	
2023.12.17	Taipei Marathon	Taipei	Taiwan	Elite	
2023.12.31	San Silvestre Vallecana	Madrid	Spain	Elite	

== See also ==
- List of World Athletics Label marathon races
- World Marathon Majors
