= 2019 IAAF Road Race Label Events =

Road running competition series

The 2019 IAAF Road Race Label Events are the twelfth edition of the global series of road running competitions given Label status by the International Association of Athletics Federations (IAAF). The series included a total of 138 road races: 64 Gold Label, 25 Silver Label and 49 Bronze Label. In terms of distance, 88 races were marathons, 28 were half marathons, 15 were 10K runs, and 7 were held over other distances. The series included all six World Marathon Majors in the Gold category.

== Races ==
- World Marathon Majors

Date	Label	Distance	Competition	Venue	Country	Men's winner	Women's winner	Number of Finishers
6 January 2019	Gold	Marathon	Xiamen Marathon	Xiamen	China	Dejene Debela (ETH)	Medina Armino (ETH)	36,826
13 January 2019	Bronze	10K run	10K Valencia Ibercaja	Valencia	Spain	(25x17px)	(25x17px)	
20 January 2019	Silver	Marathon	Chevron Houston Marathon	Houston	United States	Albert Korir (KEN)	Biruktayit Degefa (ETH)	6,684
20 January 2019	Gold	Half marathon	Aramco Houston Half Marathon	Houston	United States	Shura Kitata (ETH)	Brigid Kosgei (KEN)	
20 January 2019	Gold	Marathon	Tata Mumbai Marathon	Mumbai	India	Cosmas Lagat (KEN)	Worknesh Alemu (ETH)	46,000
25 January 2019	Gold	Marathon	Standard Chartered Dubai Marathon	Dubai	United Arab Emirates	Getaneh Tamire Molla (ETH)	Ruth Chepngetich (KEN)	1,824
27 January 2019	Gold	Marathon	Osaka Women's Marathon	Osaka	Japan		Fatuma Sado (ETH)	366
2 February 2019	Bronze	Marathon	Access Bank Lagos City Marathon	Lagos	Nigeria	Sintayehu Legese (ETH)	Meseret Dinke (ETH)	
3 February 2019	Silver	Half marathon	Kagawa Marugame International Half Marathon	Marugame	Japan	(25x17px)	(25x17px)	
10 February 2019	Gold	Half marathon	eDreams Mitja Marató de Barcelona	Barcelona	Spain	Eric Kiptanui (KEN)	Roza Dereje (ETH)	
17 February 2019	Gold	Marathon	Zurich Maratón de Seville	Seville	Spain	Tsedat Abeje Ayana (ETH)	Gutemi Shone Imana (ETH)	
17 February 2019	Gold	Marathon	Standard Chartered Hong Kong Marathon	Hong Kong	China	Barnabas Kiptum (KEN)	Volha Mazuronak (BLR)	4,744
24 February 2019	Gold	Half marathon	Medio Maratón Internacional Electrolit Guadalajara	Guadalajara	Mexico	Mathew Kipkoech Kisorio (KEN)	Afera Godfay (ETH)	
3 March 2019	Gold	Marathon	Tokyo Marathon	Tokyo	Japan	Birhanu Legese (ETH)	Ruti Aga (ETH)	35,460
10 March 2019	Gold	Marathon	Lake Biwa Mainichi Marathon	Ōtsu	Japan	Salah-Eddine Bounasr (MAR)		
10 March 2019	Bronze	Marathon	Zurich Marató Barcelona	Barcelona	Spain	(25x17px)	(25x17px)	
10 March 2019	Gold	Half marathon	Huawei Roma-Ostia Half Marathon	Rome	Italy	Guye Idemo Adola (ETH)	Lonah Chemtai Salpeter (ISR)	
10 March 2019	Gold	Marathon	Nagoya Women's Marathon	Nagoya	Japan		Helalia Johannes (NAM)	
17 March 2019	Bronze	Half marathon	Gdynia Half Marathon	Gdynia	Poland	(25x17px)	(25x17px)	
17 March 2019	Silver	Marathon	New Taipei City Wan Jin Shi Marathon	New Taipei City	Taiwan	(25x17px)	(25x17px)	5,189
17 March 2019	Gold	Marathon	Seoul International Marathon	Seoul	South Korea	Thomas Kiplagat (KEN)	Desi Jisa Mokonin (BHR)	
17 March 2019	Gold	Half marathon	EDP Meia Maratona de Lisboa	Lisbon	Portugal	Mosinet Geremew (ETH)	Vivian Jepkemoi Cheruiyot (KEN)	
24 March 2019	Bronze	Marathon	Beverly Wuxi Marathon	Wuxi	China	(25x17px)	(25x17px)	
31 March 2019	Gold	Marathon	Chang’an Automobile Chongqing International Marathon	Chongqing	China	Jimma Shambel (ETH)	Aberu Mekuria Zennebe (ETH)	
31 March 2019	Silver	Half marathon	PZU Warsaw Half Marathon	Warsaw	Poland	(25x17px)	(25x17px)	
6 April 2019	Gold	Half marathon	Sportisimo Prague Half Marathon	Prague	Czech Republic	Bernard Kimeli (KEN)	Caroline Chepkoech Kipkirui (KEN)	
7 April 2019	Gold	Marathon	Vienna City Marathon	Vienna	Austria	Vincent Kipchumba (KEN)	Nancy Jepkosgei Kiprop (KEN)	5,739
7 April 2019	Bronze	Marathon	Mangyongdae Prize Marathon	Pyongyang	North Korea	(25x17px)	(25x17px)	
7 April 2019	Bronze	Marathon	Maratona de São Paulo	São Paulo	Brazil	(25x17px)	(25x17px)	
7 April 2019	Bronze	Half marathon	Nova Poshta Kyiv Half Marathon	Kyiv	Ukraine	(25x17px)	(25x17px)	
7 April 2019	Bronze	Half marathon	Movistar Medio Maratón de Madrid	Madrid	Spain	(25x17px)	(25x17px)	
7 April 2019	Gold	Half marathon	Vodafone Istanbul Half Marathon	Istanbul	Turkey	Bernard Kipkorir Ngeno (KEN)	Ruth Chepngetich (KEN)	
7 April 2019	Silver	Marathon	HAJ Hannover Marathon	Hannover	Germany	(25x17px)	(25x17px)	
7 April 2019	Silver	Marathon	Generali Milan Marathon	Milan	Italy	(25x17px)	(25x17px)	
7 April 2019	Silver	Marathon	Daegu International Marathon	Daegu	South Korea	(25x17px)	(25x17px)	
7 April 2019	Gold	Marathon	NN Marathon Rotterdam	Rotterdam	Netherlands	Marius Kipserem (KEN)	Ashete Bekere (ETH)	14,535
7 April 2019	Silver	Marathon	Maratona Internazionale di Rome	Rome	Italy	(25x17px)	(25x17px)	8,843
14 April 2019	Gold	Marathon	Schneider Electric Marathon de Paris	Paris	France	Abrha Milaw Asefa (ETH)	Gelete Burka (ETH)	49,155
14 April 2019	Bronze	Marathon	Dongfeng Renault Wuhan Marathon	Wuhan	China	(25x17px)	(25x17px)	
14 April 2019	Silver	Marathon	Orlen Warsaw Marathon	Warsaw	Poland	(25x17px)	(25x17px)	
15 April 2019	Gold	Marathon	B.A.A. Boston Marathon	Boston	United States	Lawrence Cherono (KEN)	Worknesh Degefa (ETH)	26,657
20 April 2019	Gold	Marathon	Yellow River Estuary International Marathon	Dongying	China	Felix Kimutai (KEN)	Afera Godfay (ETH)	
21 April 2019	Gold	Marathon	Yangzhou Jianzhen International Half Marathon	Yangzhou	China	Berehanu Tsegu (ETH)	Perine Nengampi (KEN)	
21 April 2019	Bronze	Marathon	Nagano Marathon	Nagano	Japan	(25x17px)	(25x17px)	
27 April 2019	Gold	Marathon	Rock 'n' Roll Madrid Maraton	Madrid	Spain	Reuben Kerio (KEN)	Shasho Insermu (ETH)	8,106
28 April 2019	Gold	Marathon	Virgin Money London Marathon	London	United Kingdom	Eliud Kipchoge (KEN)	Brigid Kosgei (KEN)	42,549
28 April 2019	Gold	Half marathon	Gifu Seiryu Half Marathon	Gifu	Japan	Amos Kurgat (KEN)	Ruth Chepngetich (KEN)	
28 April 2019	Bronze	Marathon	PZU Cracovia Marathon	Kraków	Poland	(25x17px)	(25x17px)	
5 May 2019	Gold	Marathon	Volkswagen Prague Marathon	Prague	Czech Republic	Dawit Wolde (ETH)	Lonah Chemtai Salpeter (ISR)	7,290
12 May 2019	Silver	Marathon	32nd ICBC Cup - Dalian International Marathon	Dalian	China	(25x17px)	(25x17px)	
12 May 2019	Bronze	Marathon	Harmony Geneva Marathon for Unicef	Geneva	Switzerland	(25x17px)	(25x17px)	
19 May 2019	Gold	10K run	Tata Consultancy Services World 10K Bangalore	Bangalore	India	Andamlak Belihu (ETH)	Agnes Jebet Tirop (KEN)	
19 May 2019	Bronze	Marathon	Telnor Copenhagen Marathon	Copenhagen	Denmark	(25x17px)	(25x17px)	
19 May 2019	Gold	Marathon	Tet Riga Marathon	Riga	Latvia	Andualem Belay Shiferaw (ETH)	Birke Debele (ETH)	1,887
19 May 2019	Bronze	12K run	FNB Cape Town 12 ONERUN	Cape Town	South Africa	(25x17px)	(25x17px)	
19 May 2019	Bronze	10K run	Happy 10K Guangzhou	Guangzhou	China	(25x17px)	(25x17px)	
25 May 2019	Gold	10K run	Ottawa 10K	Ottawa	Canada	Mohamed Ziani (MAR)	Dorcas Jepchumba Kimeli (KEN)	
25 May 2019	Silver	10K run	Okpekpe Intn'l 10km Road Race	Okpekpe	Nigeria	(25x17px)	(25x17px)	
26 May 2019	Gold	Marathon	Scotiabank Ottawa Marathon	Ottawa	Canada	Albert Korir (KEN)	Tigist Girma (ETH)	2,776
2 June 2019	Gold	Marathon	"Bank of Lanzhou Cup" - Lanzhou International Marathon	Lanzhou	China	Justus Kimutai (KEN)	Workenesh Edesa (ETH)	
8 June 2019	Bronze	15K run	15K Nocturna Valencia Banco Mediolanum	Valencia	Spain	(25x17px)	(25x17px)	
15 June 2019	Bronze	10K run	Corrida de Langueux	Langueux	France	(25x17px)	(25x17px)	
15 June 2019	Gold	Half marathon	Mattoni Olomouc Half Marathon	Olomouc	Czech Republic	(25x17px)	(25x17px)	
22 June 2019	Bronze	10K run	Vidovdanska Trka 10Km	Brčko	Bosnia and Herzegovina	(25x17px)	(25x17px)	
30 June 2019	Bronze	10K run	Le 10Km de Port-Gentil	Port-Gentil	Gabon	(25x17px)	(25x17px)	
7 July 2019	Gold	Marathon	Gold Coast Marathon	Gold Coast	Australia	Yuta Shitara (JPN)	Roadah Jepkorir (KEN)	5,774
28 July 2019	Gold	Half marathon	Media Maratón de Bogotá	Bogotá	Colombia	Tamirat Tola (ETH)	Ruth Chepngetich (KEN)	
28 July 2019	Bronze	Marathon	Liupanshui Summer International Marathon	Liupanshui	China	(25x17px)	(25x17px)	
4 August 2019	Bronze	Half marathon	Sunshine Coast Half Marathon	Sunshine Coast	Australia	(25x17px)	(25x17px)	
25 August 2019	Gold	Marathon	Maratón Ciudad de México	Mexico City	Mexico	Duncan Kipkurui Maiyo (KEN)	Vivian Kiplagat (KEN)	19,742
7 September 2019	Gold	10K run	Birell Prague Grand Prix	Prague	Czech Republic	(25x17px)	(25x17px)	
8 September 2019	Gold	Marathon	Taiyuan International Marathon	Taiyuan	China	(25x17px)	(25x17px)	
15 September 2019	Gold	Marathon	Sanlam Cape Town Marathon	Cape Town	South Africa	(25x17px)	(25x17px)	8,004
15 September 2019	Gold	Marathon	Blackmores Sydney Marathon	Sydney	Australia	(25x17px)	(25x17px)	4,492
15 September 2019	Gold	Half marathon	Copenhagen Half Marathon	Copenhagen	Denmark	Geoffrey Kamworor (KEN)	Birhane Dibaba (ETH)	
15 September 2019	Silver	Half marathon	Minsk Half Marathon	Minsk	Belarus	(25x17px)	(25x17px)	
21 September 2019	Gold	Half marathon	Mattoni Ústí nad Labem Half Marathon	Ústí nad Labem	Czech Republic	Hendrik Pfeiffer (GER)	Jess Piasecki (GBR)	
22 September 2019	Bronze	Half marathon	Hyundai Porto Half Marathon	Porto	Portugal	(25x17px)	(25x17px)	
22 September 2019	Bronze	Marathon	Maratón de Buenos Aires Ñandú	Buenos Aires	Argentina	(25x17px)	(25x17px)	8,579
22 September 2019	Gold	Marathon	Hengshui Lake International Marathon	Hengshui	China	(25x17px)	(25x17px)	
22 September 2019	Silver	10 miles	Dam Tot Damloop	Amsterdam	Netherlands	Solomon Berihu (ETH)	Evaline Chirchir (KEN)	
29 September 2019	Gold	Marathon	BMW Berlin-Marathon	Berlin	Germany	Kenenisa Bekele (ETH)	Ashete Bekere (ETH)	44,065
29 September 2019	Bronze	20K run	20km International de Marrakesh	Marrakesh	Morocco	(25x17px)	(25x17px)	
6 October 2019	Bronze	Half marathon	Amgen Singelloop Breda	Breda	Netherlands	Berhane Tesfay (ERI)	Naom Jebet (KEN)	
6 October 2019	Silver	Half marathon	Cardiff University / Cardiff Half Marathon	Cardiff	United Kingdom	(25x17px)	(25x17px)	
6 October 2019	Silver	Marathon	Košice Peace Marathon	Košice	Slovakia	(25x17px)	(25x17px)	
13 October 2019	Bronze	Marathon	Raiffeisen Bank Bucharest Marathon	Bucharest	Romania	(25x17px)	(25x17px)	
13 October 2019	Gold	Marathon	Bank of America Chicago Marathon	Chicago	United States	Lawrence Cherono (KEN)	Brigid Kosgei (KEN)	45,956
13 October 2019	Silver	20K run	Les 20 Km de Paris	Paris	France	(25x17px)	(25x17px)	
13 October 2019	Bronze	Marathon	Wizz Air Sofia Marathon	Sofia	Bulgaria	(25x17px)	(25x17px)	
13 October 2019	Bronze	Half marathon	Changzhou West Taihu Lake Half Marathon	Changzhou	China	(25x17px)	(25x17px)	
13 October 2019	Bronze	10K run	FNB Durban 10K CITYSURFRUN	Durban	South Africa	(25x17px)	(25x17px)	
20 October 2019	Gold	Marathon	TCS Amsterdam Marathon	Amsterdam	Netherlands	Vincent Kipchumba (KEN)	Degitu Azimeraw (ETH)	13,475
20 October 2019	Gold	Half marathon	Luso Meia Maratona	Lisbon	Portugal	(25x17px)	(25x17px)	
20 October 2019	Silver	Marathon	EDP Maratona de Lisboa	Lisbon	Portugal	(25x17px)	(25x17px)	4,597
20 October 2019	Gold	Half marathon	Airtel Delhi Half Marathon	New Delhi	India	(25x17px)	(25x17px)	
20 October 2019	Gold	Marathon	Scotiabank Toronto Waterfront Marathon	Toronto	Canada	(25x17px)	(25x17px)	3,838
20 October 2019	Bronze	Marathon	PKO Poznań Marathon	Poznań	Poland	(25x17px)	(25x17px)	
27 October 2019	Bronze	Marathon	Changsha International Marathon	Changsha	China	(25x17px)	(25x17px)	
27 October 2019	Gold	Marathon	Mainova Frankfurt Marathon	Frankfurt	Germany	(25x17px)	(25x17px)	10,561
27 October 2019	Gold	Marathon	Volkswagen Ljubljana Marathon	Ljubljana	Slovenia	(25x17px)	(25x17px)	1,572
27 October 2019	Gold	Half marathon	Medio Maratón Valencia Trinidad Alfonso EDP	Valencia	Spain	(25x17px)	(25x17px)	
27 October 2019	Bronze	Marathon	Huawei Venice Marathon	Venice	Italy	(25x17px)	(25x17px)	
1 November 2019	Bronze	10K run	La Corsa dei Santi 10Km	Rome	Italy	(25x17px)	(25x17px)	
3 November 2019	Gold	Marathon	TCS New York City Marathon	New York City	United States	Geoffrey Kamworor (KEN)	Joyciline Jepkosgei (KEN)	53,627
3 November 2019	Bronze	Marathon	Maratona do Porto EDP	Porto	Portugal	(25x17px)	(25x17px)	
3 November 2019	Bronze	Marathon	Maratón Internacional Megacable Guadalajara	Guadalajara	Mexico	(25x17px)	(25x17px)	
3 November 2019	Gold	Marathon	Istanbul Marathon	Istanbul	Turkey	Daniel Kibet (KEN)	Hirut Tibebu (ETH)	2,854
3 November 2019	Gold	Marathon	Hangzhou Marathon	Hangzhou	China	Marius Kimutai (BHR)	Agnes Jeruto Kiprotich (KEN)	
3 November 2019	Gold	Marathon	CFLD Beijing Marathon	Beijing	China	Mathew Kipkoech Kisorio (KEN)	Sutume Asefa Kebede (ETH)	30,000
9 November 2019	Bronze	Marathon	Xichang Qionghai Lake Wetland International Marathon	Xichang	China	(25x17px)	(25x17px)	
10 November 2019	Silver	Marathon	BLOM Bank Beirut Marathon	Beirut	Lebanon	Cancelled		
10 November 2019	Silver	Marathon	Hefei International Marathon	Hefei	China	(25x17px)	(25x17px)	
10 November 2019	Bronze	Marathon	Nanjing Marathon	Nanjing	China	(25x17px)	(25x17px)	
10 November 2019	Bronze	Marathon	Nanchang International Marathon	Nanchang	China	(25x17px)	(25x17px)	
17 November 2019	Bronze	Marathon	Kobe Marathon	Kobe	Japan	(25x17px)	(25x17px)	
17 November 2019	Gold	Marathon	Shanghai International Marathon	Shanghai	China	Paul Lonyangata (KEN)	Yebrgual Melese (ETH)	
17 November 2019	Bronze	Half marathon	Semi-Marathon de Boulogne Billancourt Christian Granger	Boulogne-Billancourt	France	(25x17px)	(25x17px)	
24 November 2019	Bronze	Marathon	Asics Firenze Marathon	Florence	Italy	Sahlesilassie Bekele (ETH)	Jess Piasecki (GBR)	
30 November 2019	Gold	Marathon	Standard Chartered Singapore Marathon	Singapore	Singapore	Joshua Kipkorir (KEN)	Priscah Jepleting Cherono (KEN)	
1 December 2019	Silver	10K run	10K Valencia Trinidad Alfonso	Valencia	Spain	(25x17px)	(25x17px)	
1 December 2019	Gold	Marathon	Maratón Valencia Trinidad Alfonso EDP	Valencia	Spain	Kinde Atanaw (ETH)	Roza Dereje (ETH)	21,654
1 December 2019	Bronze	Marathon	Marathon Comarch de la ville de Tunis	Tunis	Tunisia	(25x17px)	(25x17px)	
1 December 2019	Bronze	Marathon	GSEZ Marathon du Gabon	Libreville	Gabon	(25x17px)	(25x17px)	
1 December 2019	Bronze	Marathon	SCO Kunming International Marathon	Kunming	China	(25x17px)	(25x17px)	
1 December 2019	Gold	Marathon	The 73rd Fukuoka International Open Marathon Championships	Fukuoka	Japan	Taku Fujimoto (JPN)		370
8 December 2019	Gold	Marathon	Guangzhou Marathon	Guangzhou	China	Gebretsadik Abraha (ETH)	Hiwot Gebrekidan (ETH)	
8 December 2019	Silver	Marathon	Saitama International Marathon	Saitama	Japan	(25x17px)	(25x17px)	
15 December 2019	Gold	Marathon	Shenzhen Marathon	Shenzhen	China	Tadesse Tola (ETH)	Belainesh Yami Gurmu (ETH)	
15 December 2019	Silver	Half marathon	Bangsaen21 Half Marathon	Chonburi	Thailand	(25x17px)	(25x17px)	
15 December 2019	Silver	Marathon	Mersin Marathon	Mersin	Turkey	(25x17px)	(25x17px)	
15 December 2019	Bronze	Marathon	Taipei Marathon	Taipei	Taiwan	(25x17px)	(25x17px)	6,990
15 December 2019	Bronze	Marathon	Zurich Maratón Málaga	Málaga	Spain	(25x17px)	(25x17px)	
15 December 2019	Silver	25K run	Tata Steel Kolkata 25K	Kolkata	India	(25x17px)	(25x17px)	
29 December 2019	Silver	10K run	Corrida Pédestre Internationale de Houilles	Houilles	France	(25x17px)	(25x17px)	
31 December 2019	Bronze	15K run	Corrida Internacional de São Silvestre	São Paulo	Brazil	(25x17px)	(25x17px)	
31 December 2019	Gold	10K run	Nationale-Nederlanden San Silvestre Vallecana	Madrid	Spain	Bashir Abdi (BEL)	Helen Bekele (ETH)	
31 December 2019	Bronze	10K run (men); 5K run (women)	BOclassic Südtirol	Bolzano	Italy	Eyob Ghebrehiwet Faniel (ITA)	Margaret Chelimo Kipkemboi (KEN)	
