= Khon Kaen International Marathon =

Race in Khon Kaen, Thailand

- Date: late January
- Location: Khon Kaen, Thailand
- Event type: Road
- Distance: Marathon, Half marathon, 11.55 km
- Established: 2004
- Course records: Men: 2:16:44 (Kenya) Kennedy Lilian (2011); Women: 2:40:50 (Kenya) Fridah Lodepa (2011)
- Website: Khon Kaen International Marathon
- Participants: 3,654 (2020); 5,761 (2019); 40,000 (2018)

The Khon Kaen International Marathon is held every late January in Khon Kaen, northeastern Thailand. It is organized by Khon Kaen University.

It is attended by dozens of runners from Ethiopia and Kenya, as well as by top runners from Thailand, Laos, Taiwan, and other countries. A total of 40,000 runners attended the marathon events in 2018. It has been organized every consecutive year, and was founded in 2004.

== Past winners ==
Key: Course record

=== Marathon ===
Edition	Year	Men's winner	Time (h:m:s)	Women's winner	Time (h:m:s)
19th	2024	Kenneth Omulo (KEN)	2:17:08	Tsega Desta (ETH)	2:40:24
18th	2023	Paul Eyanae (KEN)	2:15:24	Zinashwork Yenew (ETH)	2:49:03
–	2022	Did not hold			
–	2021	Did not hold			
17th	2020	Asrar Hayredun (ETH)	2:20:17	Tsega Mehari (ETH)	2:53:25
16th	2019	Yohannesse Degefa (ETH)	2:19:30	Margaret Wangui (KEN)	2:46:19
15th	2018	Besha Teshome (ETH)	2:21:29	Bize Beyira (ETH)	2:49:07
14th	2017	Yohannesse Degefa (ETH)	2:23:55	Margaret Wangui (KEN)	2:50:50
13th	2016	Albert Kangor (KEN)	2:21:35	Rahel Kebede (ETH)	2:49:18
12th	2015	Alex Melly (KEN)	2:22:42	Rahel Kebede (ETH)	2:51:12
11th	2014	Charles Kigen (KEN)	2:17:09	Bayush Abebe (ETH)	2:53:41
10th	2013	Charles Kigen (KEN)	2:19:29	Imaculate Chemutai (UGA)	2:42:25
9th	2012	Daniel Gekara (KEN)	2:23:18	Jacqueline Kiplimo (KEN)	2:51:22
8th	2011	Kennedy Lilian (KEN)	2:16:44	Fridah Lodepa (KEN)	2:40:50
7th	2010	Kennedy Melly (KEN)	2:17:21	Fridah Lodepa (KEN)	2:54:59
6th	2009	Joel Kemboi (KEN)	2:13:32*	Sunisa Sailomyen (THA)	2:45:18
5th	2008	Luka Chelimo (KEN)	2:21:20	Sunisa Sailomyen (THA)	2:52:10
4th	2007	Joel Kemboi (KEN)	2:21:36	Wioletta Uryga (POL)	2:52:28
3rd	2006	Boonchu Chandecha (THA)	2:23:21	Wioletta Uryga (POL)	2:51:57
2nd	2005	Neo Molema (RSA)	2:22:42	Sunisa Sailomyen (THA)	3:01:56
1st	2004	Vladimir Kotov (BLR)	2:22:02	Sunisa Sailomyen (THA)	2:56:03

(*) Not valid for records or rankings

=== Half marathon ===
Edition	Year	Men's winner	Time (h:m:s)	Women's winner	Time (h:m:s)
19th	2024	Alexander Muhia (KEN)	1:07:01	Misa Yimer (ETH)	1:15:54
18th	2023	Gezu Muse (ETH)	1:03:52	Misa Yimer (ETH)	1:13:42
–	2022	Did not hold			
–	2021	Did not hold			
17th	2020	Eyob Habtesilasse (ETH)	1:03:07	Tigist Deme (ETH)	1:16:31
16th	2019	Asrar Hayredun (ETH)	1:04:19	Careen Cheptoeck (KEN)	1:18:14
15th	2018	Kenneth Kemboi (KEN)	1:04:51	Zewditu Ashenafi (ETH)	1:15:14
14th	2017	Kenneth Kemboi (KEN)	1:04:03	Adawork Aberta (ETH)	1:18:14
13th	2016	Fresew Asfaw (ETH)	1:04:50	Gladys Tarus (KEN)	1:15:15
12th	2015	Gideon Kipkemboi (KEN)	1:04:03	Senayt Woldemariam (ETH)	1:17:35

=== 11.55 km ===
Edition	Year	Men's winner	Time (h:m:s)	Women's winner	Time (h:m:s)
19th	2024	Moges Abate (ETH)	35:31	Tseganesh Yedaw (ETH)	42:32
18th	2023	James Karanja (KEN)	34:40	Emebet Sode (ETH)	42:39
–	2022	Did not hold			
–	2021	Did not hold			
17th	2020	Francis Nduta (KEN)	34:59	Alice Koigi (KEN)	40:14
16th	2019	James Kahura (KEN)	34:40	Addisalem Sileshi (ETH)	40:02
15th	2018	Gosha Tefera (ETH)	34:39	Birtukan Fente (ETH)	42:08
14th	2017	Francis Nduta (KEN)	34:49	Mahlet Shewangizaw (ETH)	40:34
13th	2016	Hillary Kipchumba (KEN)	35:52	Viola Kimeli (KEN)	44:12
12th	2015	James Maregu (KEN)	34:01	Lodkeo Inthakoumman (LAO)	44:08
