= Pattaya Marathon =

Race in Pattaya, Thailand

- Date: July
- Location: Pattaya, Chonburi Province, Thailand
- Event type: Road
- Distance: Marathon, Half marathon, 10k
- Primary sponsor: Amazing Thailand, MAMA
- Website: Official website

The Pattaya Marathon is held every July in Pattaya, Chonburi Province, Thailand. It is organized by the City of Pattaya.

In 2018, the marathon had a total of 10,000 participants. The City of Pattaya plans to significantly improve the marathon in the coming years, in an attempt to rebrand Pattaya as a leading "sports city."

== Past winners ==
Key: Course record

=== Marathon ===
Year	Men's winner	Time (h:m:s)	Women's winner	Time (h:m:s)
2024	James Tallam (KEN)	2:25:41	Caroline Cherono (KEN)	2:52:53
2023	Yimer Bililign (ETH)	2:22.27	Tsega Desta (ETH)	2:56:28
2022	Cornelius Kibiwott (KEN)	2:28:34	Nateewan Rattanaphan (THA)	3:32:08
2018	Bernard Kiplangat (KEN)	2:44:15	Abtew Wubhareg (ETH)	3:19:36
2017	Gilbert Muge (KEN)	2:31:55	Margaret Wangui (KEN)	2:56:05
2016	Noha Chepsergon (KEN)	2:39:33	Tabitha Wambui (KEN)	3:10:16

=== Half marathon ===
Year	Men's winner	Time (h:m:s)	Women's winner	Time (h:m:s)
2024	Emmanuel Kiprono (KEN)	1:06:46	Misa Yimer (ETH)	1:17:00
2023	John Muiriri (KEN)	1:09:40	Gebeyehu Adbaru (ETH)	1:21:07
2022	John Muiriri (KEN)	1:08:25	Lodkeo Inthakoumman (LAO)	1:23:14
2018	Nattawat Innum (THA)	1:16:12	Cynthia Chelangat (KEN)	1:25:35
2017	Godfrey Ngetich (KEN)	1::15:30	Rosemary Katua (KEN)	1:27:27
2016	Alex Melly (KEN)	1:11:51	Tanaphon Assawawongcharoen (THA)	1:31:53

=== Quarter marathon ===
Year	Men's winner	Time (h:m:s)	Women's winner	Time (h:m:s)
2024	Emmanuel Kiprono (KEN)	30:03	Langat Chepngetich (KEN)	34:06
2023	John Muiriri (KEN)	31:05	Gebeyehu Adbaru (ETH)	35:55
2018	Cherdchai Phootako (THA)	34:05	Lodkeo Inthakoumman (LAO)	39:23
2017	Sanchai Namkhet (THA)	35:07	Natthaya Thanaronnawat (THA)	44:52
2016	Nattawut Innum (THA)	36:44.5	Suwari Thanaekkanithiwat (THA)	43:28.7
