= Bangkok Marathon =

Annual race in Thailand held since 1987

- Logo of Bangkok Marathon
- Location: Bangkok, Thailand
- Event type: Road
- Distance: Marathon, half marathon
- Primary sponsor: BDMS
- Established: 1987 (39 years ago)
- Course records: Men: 2:16:10 (2010) (Kenya) Kennedy Lilan; Women: 2:41:37 (2012) (Kenya) Elizabeth Chemweno
- Website: Bangkok Marathon
- Participants: 1,608 (2019); 2,566 (2018) >33,000 (all races) (2015)

The Bangkok Marathon (Thai: กรุงเทพมาราธอน) is a marathon held annually in Bangkok, Thailand, since 1987. The marathon is recognized by the Association of International Marathons and Distance Races (AIMS).

The event is a distinguished from Amazing Thailand Marathon Bangkok, hosted by Tourism Authority of Thailand, also a World Athletics-certified race.

== History ==
In 1987, a marathon was held over the Rama IX Bridge in honor of the king's 60th birthday. Called the Royal Marathon, it helped launch a running boom in Thailand.

In 2013, the course of the half marathon was changed at the last minute because of concurrent Bangkok street protests which reduced the distance of the half marathon from 21.1 km (13.1 miles) to 19.7 km (12.2 miles).

The 2020-2021 edition of the race was postponed to 2021 due to the coronavirus pandemic, before registration opened.

== Course ==
The course passes many historical landmarks of cultural and ethnic importance. The marathon starts and finishes in front of The Royal Grand Palace at Sanam Chai Road. The race course is sanctioned by The Association of International Marathons and Distance Races (AIMS) and the Amateur Athletic Association of Thailand (IAAF Rules).

== Other races ==
Along with full and half marathons, 10 km and 5 km races were also held.

== Winners ==
Key: Course record (in bold)

Ed.	Year	Men's winner	Time	Women's winner	Time	Rf.
1	1987	Eddy Hellebuyck (BEL)	2:23:55	Yuko Gordon (HKG)	2:57:40	
2	1988	Yoshihiro Hiramori (JPN)	2:18:10	Yuko Gordon (HKG)	2:52:37	
3	1989	Doug Kurtis (USA)	2:20:15	Cesarina Taroni (ITA)	2:47:53	
4	1990	Doug Kurtis (USA)	2:27:30	Victoria Bunard (MYA)	2:55:15	
5	1991	Doug Kurtis (USA)	2:25:20	Suzanne Ray (USA)	2:48:52	
6	1992	Phillip (MYA)	2:25:24	Lucy Ramwell (GBR)	2:48:28	
7	1993	Daniel Shungea (KEN)	2:23:18	Suman Rawat (IND)	2:58:28	
8	1994	Daniel Shungea (KEN)	2:22:04	Ren Xiujuan (CHN)	2:49:21	
9	1995	Daniel Shungea (KEN)	2:28:35	Rigzen Angmo (IND)	2:51:14	
10	1996	Daniel Shungea (KEN)	2:25:24	Tian Mei (CHN)	2:44:30	
—	1997	not held				
11	1998	Michael Mukoma (KEN)	2:18:59	Wioletta Uryga (POL)	2:53:00	
12	1999	Michael Mukoma (KEN)	2:21:30	Wioletta Uryga (POL)	2:46:40	
13	2000	Vladimir Kotov (BLR)	2:31:11	Sunisa Sailomyen (THA)	2:54:01	
14	2001	Vladimir Kotov (BLR)	2:26:55	Wioletta Kryza (POL)	2:48:30	
15	2002	Jason Mayeroff (USA)	2:27:46	Natalya Volgina (RUS)	2:54:05	
16	2003	Rik Ceulemans (BEL)	2:24:34	Sunisa Sailomyen (THA)	2:59:31	
17	2004	John Sitienei (KEN)	2:22:53	Lillian Chelimo (KEN)	2:57:48	
18	2005	John Sitienei (KEN)	2:23:57	Saiphon Piawong (THA)	3:02:01	
19	2006	John Sitienei (KEN)	2:28:02	Wioletta Uryga (POL)	2:56:50	
20	2007	John Tubei (KEN)	2:18:27	Fridah Lodepa (KEN)	2:51:42	
21	2008	Nelson Rotich (KEN)	2:19:13	Sunisa Sailomyen (THA)	2:48:23	
22	2009	Francis Kibii (KEN)	2:16:41	Ecler Loywapet (KEN)	2:43:49	
23	2010	Kennedy Lilian (KEN)	2:16:10	Fridah Lodepa (KEN)	2:42:47	
—	2011	not held				
24	2012 (Feb)	Patrick Rotich (KEN)	2:18:31	Elizabeth Chemweno (KEN)	2:41:37	
25	2012 (Nov)	John Samoei (KEN)	2:30:24	Everline Nyama (KEN)	2:50:12	
26	2013	John Samoei (KEN)	2:30:27	Sunisa Sailomyen (THA)	3:02:31	
27	2014	Lukas Muteti (KEN)	2:33:52	Arpassara Prasarthinpimai (THA)	3:15:00	
28	2015	Nelson Kiptoo (KEN)	2:35:45	Arpassara Prasarthinpimai (THA)	3:12:03	
—	2016	not held				
30	2017	Peter Kipleting (KEN)	2:26:13	Mahlet Shewangizaw (ETH)	2:52:42	
31	2018	Wendwesen Tilahun (ETH)	2:26:39	Julia Njari (KEN)	2:53:31	
32	2019	Philip Lagat (KEN)	2:33:55	Etaferahu Dubale (ETH)	2:55:14	
—	2020	postponed due to coronavirus pandemic				
—	2021	postponed due to coronavirus pandemic				
