= Immaculate Chemutai =

Ugandan long-distance runner

Personal information
- Born: 2 December 1987 (age 38)

Sport
- Sport: Athletics
- Event: Marathon

Achievements and titles
- Personal best: Marathon: 2:28:30 (2021)

Immaculate Chemutai (born 2 December 1987) is an Ugandan marathon runner.

On 9 February 2020, Chemutai set a new national record for the Ugandan women's marathon with a time of 2:32:41 at the Buriram Marathon.

Chemutai clocked 2:29:09 during the Xiamen Marathon on April 11, 2021, to set a new personal best and meet the Olympic qualifying standard. She was confirmed as part of the Ugandan Olympic team for the delayed 2020 Tokyo Olympics, in May 2021.

She competed in the women's marathon at the 2022 World Athletics Championships held in Eugene, Oregon, United States.
