= Ilya Tyapkin =

Kyrgyzstani marathon runner

Ilya Vladimirovich Tyapkin (Russian: Илья́ Влади́мирович Тя́пкин; born August 2, 1991 in Kara-Balta) is a Kyrgyzstani marathon runner. He competed at the 2016 Summer Olympics in the men's marathon, in which he placed 86th.

Tyapkin won the Tashkent Marathon in 2022 in a time of 2:21:42.
