= Bangsaen42 Marathon =

Thai marathon

- Date: November
- Location: Chonburi Province, Thailand
- Event type: Road
- Distance: Marathon
- Established: 2017
- Website: Bangsaen42

The Bangsaen42 Chonburi Marathon is an annual marathon held in Bang Saen, Chonburi Province, Thailand. Bangsaen42 has only the 42.195 km full marathon distance as its sole event. Its inaugural event was in 2017. The race is organized by MICE & Communication, a Bangkok-based event management company, which also organizes the Bangsaen21 Half Marathon.
