= Lima Marathon =

- Date: May
- Location: Lima, Peru
- Event type: Road
- World Athletics Cat.: Elite
- Distance: Marathon
- Established: 2009
- Edition: 16
- Website: https://lima42k.com.pe/

The Lima Marathon (also known as Maratón Lima 42k or simply Lima 42k) is a road running event held on the streets of Lima, Peru, in which amateur and professional runners compete in the 10 km, 21 km (half marathon), and 42 km (marathon) categories. Its first edition was held on May 21, 2009, with the men's category won by Kenyan athlete Anthony Mbithi Mukuthi and the women's category won by Bolivian athlete Carla Velázquez.

The Lima Marathon holds an Elite label from World Athletics, making it, alongside the Lima Half Marathon, one of only two Peruvian races endorsed by World Athletics, and the only Peruvian marathon (42K) with this endorsement. As of 2025, the Lima Marathon is, along with the Cali Marathon, one of only two World Athletics Elite-labeled marathons in South America.

== Champions ==
=== Marathon, General Category ===
Winners and times recorded in the 42 km across the different editions of the event.

Edition	Date	Men's winner	Time (h:m:s)	Women's winner	Time (h:m:s)
2009	May 21, 2009	(Kenya) Anthony Mbithi Mukuthi	2:24:32	(Bolivia) Carla Velázquez	3:04:49
2010	May 2, 2010	(Kenya) Festus Kioko Kikumu	2:23:27	(Peru) Lady Morales Quinto	2:51:09
2011	May 15, 2011	(Kenya) Peter Lemayian Nkaya	2:16:58	(Peru) Lady Morales Quinto	2:51:20
2012	May 20, 2012	(Kenya) Isaac Kemboi Kimaiyo	2:15:59	(Peru) Olinda Canchanya	2:58:50
2013	May 19, 2013	(Kenya) Isaac Kemboi Kimaiyo	2:19:13	(Kenya) Ogla Jerono Kimaiyo	2:40:38
2014	May 18, 2014	(Kenya) Simon Kariuki Njoroge	2:13:39	(Kenya) Gladys Jebet Ruto	2:46:21
2015	May 17, 2015	(Kenya) Julius Muriuki Wahome	2:17:38	(Kenya) Mirriam Wangari	2:41:40
2016	May 15, 2016	(Kenya) Nicholas Manza Kamakya	2:13:57	(Kenya) Caroline Kiptoo	2:39:10
2017	May 21, 2017	(United States) Jeffrey Eggleston	2:15:22	(Ethiopia) Ayelu Lemma Geda	2:30:19
2018	May 20, 2018	(Kenya) Stephen Njoroge Mbure	2:17:49	(Ethiopia) Belainesh Zemedkun Gebre	2:50:55
2019	May 19, 2019	(Kenya) Timothy Kemboi	2:17:59	(Peru) Clara Canchanya	2:47:33
2020–2021	Editions not held due to the COVID-19 pandemic				
2022	September 11, 2022	(Peru) Cristhian Pacheco	2:09:07	(Kenya) Abigael Jepkemboi	2:29:52
2023	May 21, 2023	(Argentina) Eulalio Muñoz	2:14:39	(Ethiopia) Muliye Dekebo	2:29:53
2024	May 19, 2024	(Kenya) Dominic Letting	2:11:48	(Ethiopia) Atsede Bayisa	2:24:46
2025	May 25, 2025	(Kenya) Dominic Letting	2:11:56	(Ethiopia) Aberash Demisse	2:28:29
2026	May 24, 2026	(Kenya) John Mburu Muiruri	2:10:21	(Ethiopia) Aberash Robi	2:27:30

== Wins by nationality ==
Country	Men	Women	Total
Kenya	13	5	18
Peru	1	4	5
Ethiopia	0	6	6
Bolivia	0	1	1
United States	1	0	1
Argentina	1	0	1

== See also ==
- Lima Half Marathon
