= Amazing Thailand Marathon Bangkok =

Road running event in Thailand

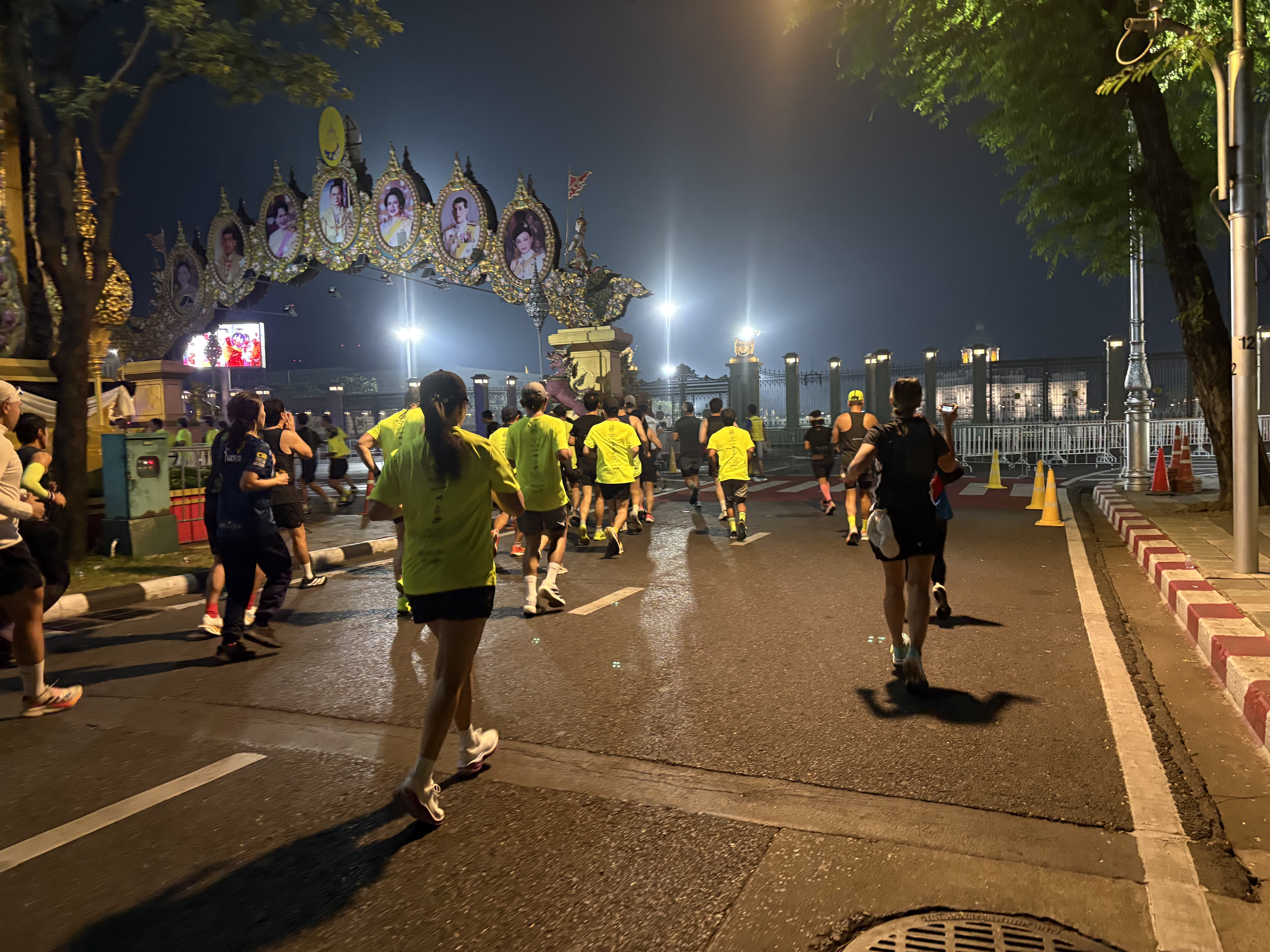
- The race in 2025 near Anantasamakhom Throne Hall
- Date: Late November
- Location: Bangkok, Thailand
- Event type: Road
- Distance: Marathon; Half-marathon; 10 and 5 km
- Primary sponsor: Amazing Thailand and Toyota
- Established: 2018 (8 years ago)
- Course records: Men: 2:14:27 (2025) (Ethiopia) Agunafr Bekele; Women: 2:39:27 (2025) (Kenya) Eunice Muchiri
- Website: ATM Bangkok 2025
- Participants: 43525 (all distances)

Amazing Thailand Marathon Bangkok (abbreviated as ATMBKK) is a marathon held annually in Bangkok, Thailand. The event was first held on the 3-4 February 2018. It is hosted by the Tourism Authority of Thailand (TAT) via its campaign Amazing Thailand with Thailand Tri-League as the organiser. The marathon is categorised as a Road Race label by World Athletics, reaching Bronze label in 2020 for its 2021 race and is recognised by the Association of International Marathons and Distance Races since 2021. The event is officially endorsed by both the central government, and the Bangkok Metropolitan Administration. The event hosts four distances; marathon, half-marathon, 10, and 5 kilometres.

The event generates over THB 500 million income for the city's tourism sector annually. In 2025, the event has a number of over 48,000 participants for all distances; with 5,008 participants for marathon alone, prompting the event to close the sign-up earlier. The participants for 2024 were over 33,000 for all distances.

== History ==
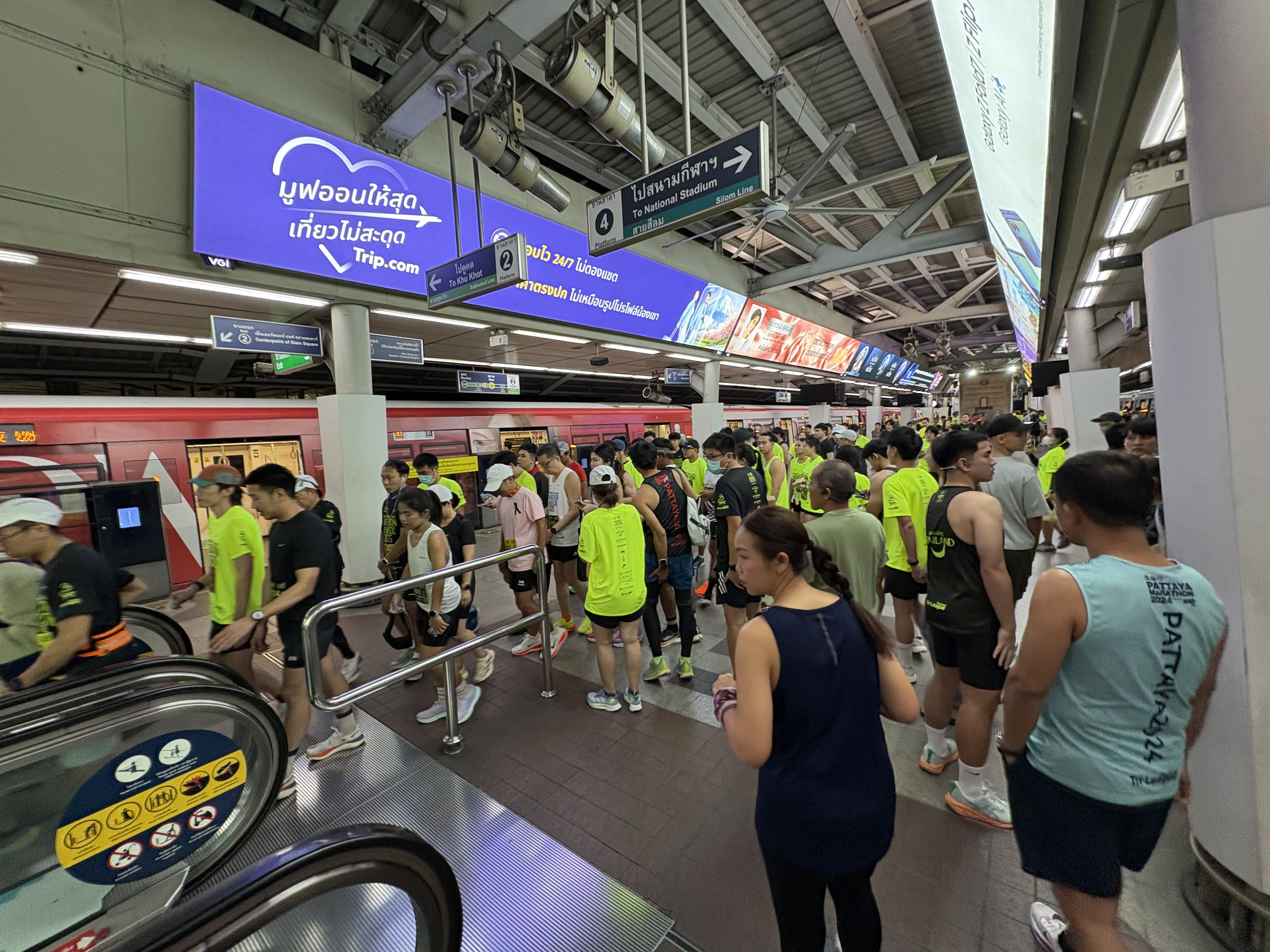
Participants at Siam BTS station near the starting line for the 2025 event

The event was first held in 2018 with the course running from Rajamangala Stadium to the Democracy Monument. One of the two race dates coincided with the nationwide school standardisation exam, O-NET.

Marathon world record holder Eliud Kipchoge attends the event since 2024 as an ambassador for Tourism Authority of Thailand, running a 10K in 2024, and a half-marathon in 2025; pacing the queen of Thailand Suthida in both occasions.

Since 2024, the course starting point was moved to MBK Center and the finishing point at Sanam Luang. Due to its proximity to the starting point, the city's elevated BTS Skytrain extends its operating hours to suit the participants.

For the 2025 event Nike, as a major sponsor, rented out a number of billboards with wordings along the route with copywriting that was "hypercontextualised" to Bangkok; such as "No Tuk-Tuks, No Motorbikes, Just Your Legs." The ad was praised by participants and online.

== Course ==
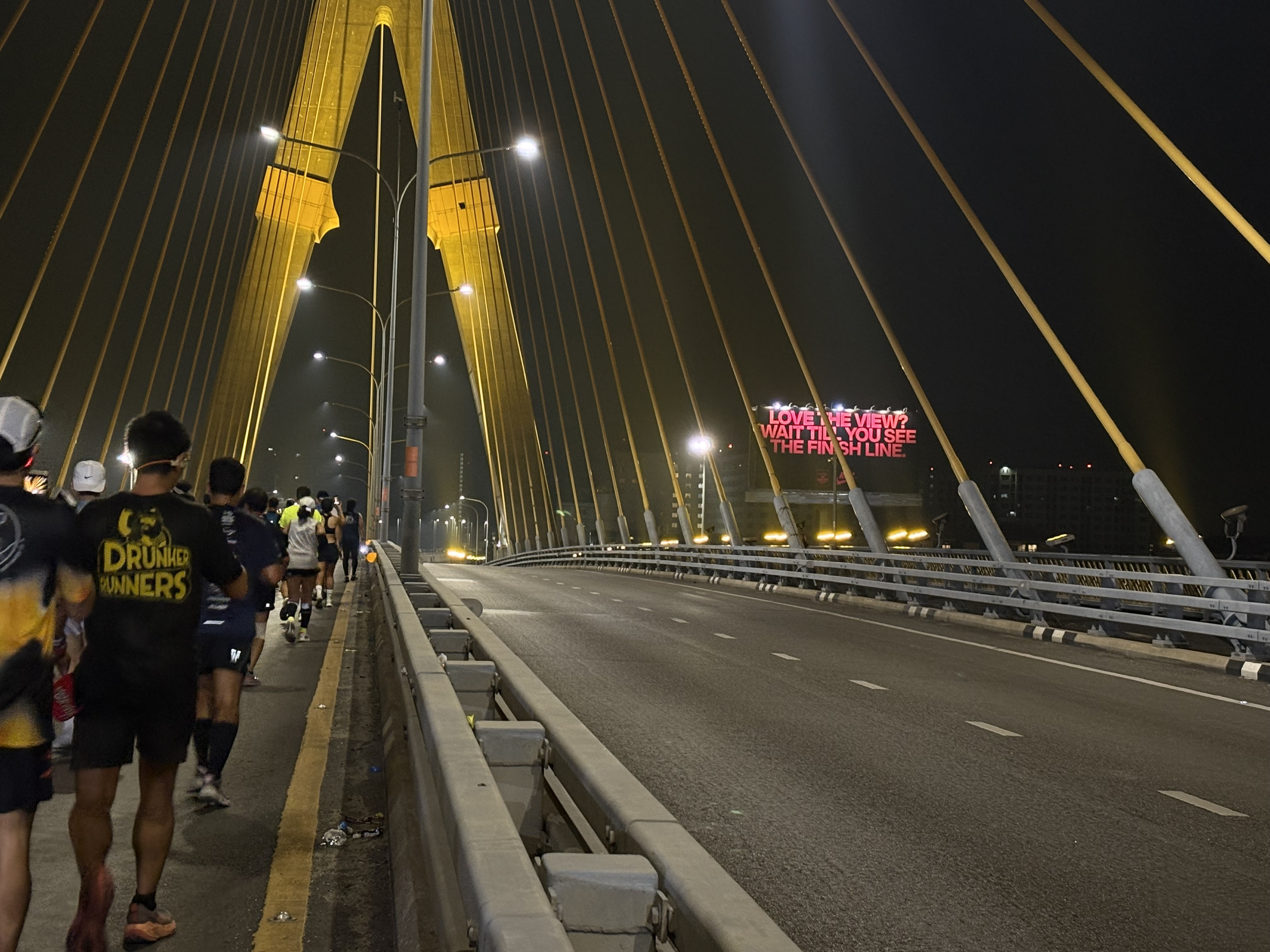
The marathon in 2025 on the Rama VIII bridge, seeing one of Nike's many billboards for the event

ATMBKK 2025 run on a point-to-point course that begins at MBK Center in Pathum Wan district, passing landmarks such as the Victory Monument and Anantasamakhom Throne Hall, before turning westward onto the Rama VIII bridge, continuing on Borommaratchachonnani elevated highway, and looping back before ending at the Sanam Luang. The course for its half-marathon follows the same route without running onto the Rama VIII bridge and the elevated highway.

The previous route used from 2018 to 2023 began at Rajamangala Stadium and finished at the Democracy Monument. It was changed to the current route in 2024.
