= Tunis–Carthage Marathon =

Annual race in Tunisia since 1986

- Date: December
- Location: Tunis, Tunis, Tunisia
- Event type: Road
- Distance: Marathon, half marathon, 5K
- Established: 1986 (40 years ago)
- Website: https://marathon.comar.tn

The Tunis–Carthage Marathon (French: Marathon de Tunis–Carthage (Note: It is also known as the "Tunis–Carthage COMAR Marathon" (Note: "COMAR" is an acronym for "Compagnie Méditerranéenne d'Assurance et de Réassurance".) (French: Marathon de COMAR Tunis–Carthage) for sponsorship reasons..)) is an annual road-based marathon hosted by Tunis, Tunisia, since 1986. The marathon is a World Athletics Label Road Race and a member of the Association of International Marathons and Distance Races. During the race weekend, a half marathon, a 10K race, and a 5K race are also offered.

== History ==
The inaugural race was held on 15 October 1986 as the "COMAR Marathon". Tunisian runner Houcine Makni won the marathon with a finish time of 2:46:48. (Note: The Association of Road Racing Statisticians has no record of a female winner until the third race was held in 1998.)
