= Kigali International Peace Marathon =

Annual race in Rwanda since 2005

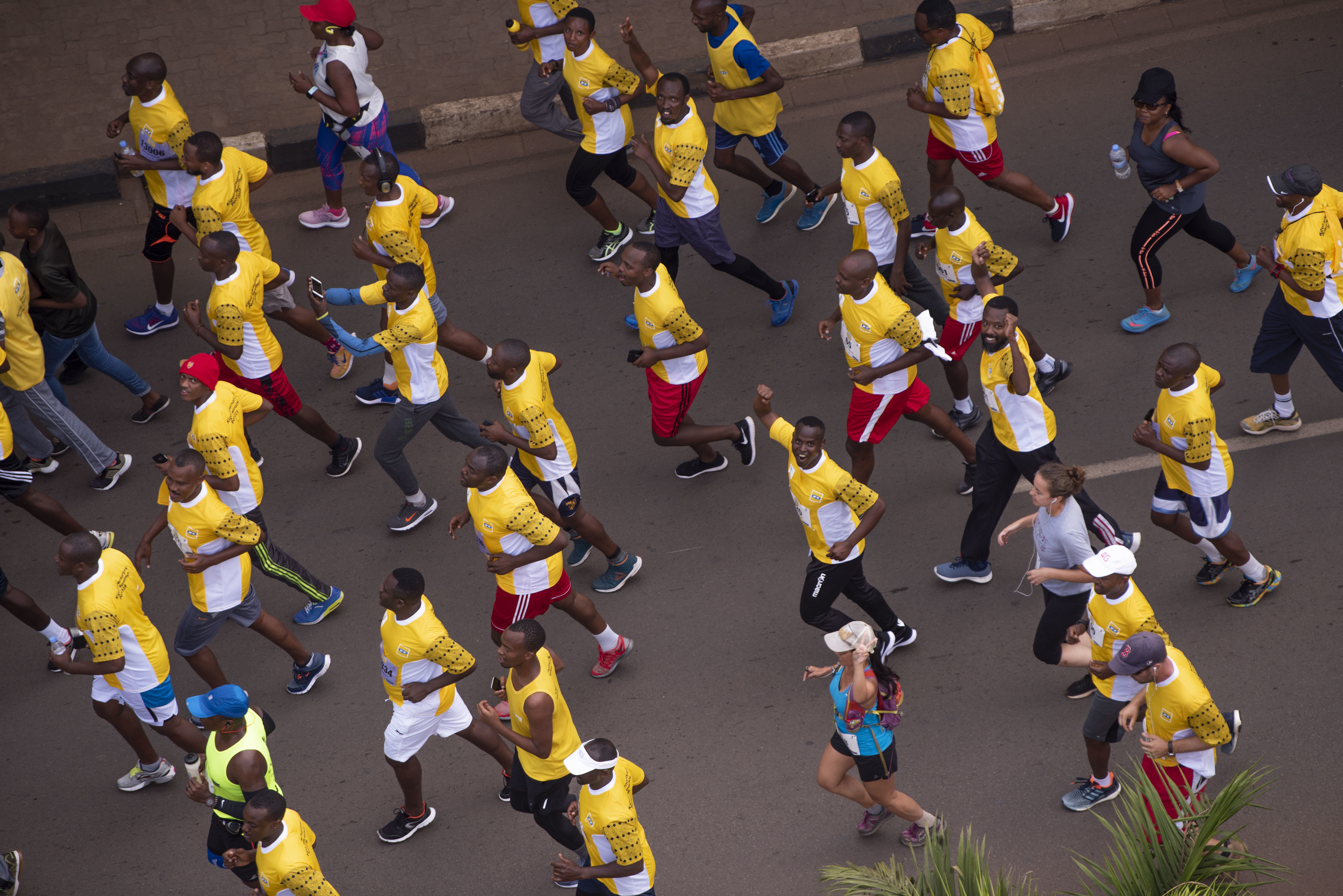
- Runners during one of the races of the event
- Date: May or June
- Location: Kigali, Rwanda
- Event type: Road
- Distance: Marathon
- Established: 2005 (21 years ago)
- Website: Official website
- Participants: 73 finishers (2022); 33 finishers (2021)

The Kigali International Peace Marathon (Note: It has also been referred to as the "Kigali Marathon", "Kigali Peace Marathon", "Kigali International Marathon", and "Rwanda Peace Marathon". In addition, the inaugural race was also called the "Soroptimist International Peace Marathon".) is an annual road-based marathon hosted by Kigali, Rwanda, since 2005. It is a World Athletics Label Road Race and a member of the Association of International Marathons and Distance Races. During the race weekend, a half marathon and a 10K fun run (Note: The race is not timed.) are also offered. A night run is also associated with the event, though not held during the same weekend.

== History ==
In 2004, during the aftermath of the Rwandan genocide a decade earlier, Soroptimist International decided to organize a marathon to promote the development of peace through sports. The inaugural race was held on 15 May 2005.

The 2020 edition of the race was postponed twice before being cancelled due to the coronavirus pandemic.

== Course ==
External image
- Course map of full marathon in 2022

The marathon begins and ends in front of BK Arena. It consists of two loops, which half marathoners run once.

== Winners ==
Ed.	Date	Male Winner	Time	Female Winner	Time	Rf.
1	2005.05.15	Joseph Nsubuga (UGA)	2:28:23	Margaret Nakintu (UGA)	3:18:06	
2	2006	Benjamin Itok (KEN)	2:22:03	Tabitha Kibet (KEN)	2:57:27	
3	2007	Daniel Rotich (KEN)	2:20:43	Priscah Kiprono (KEN)	2:52:24	
4	2008	Jacob Kipleting (KEN)	2:18:06	Risper Kimaiyo (KEN)	2:55:22	
5	2009	Benjamin Kipkosgei (KEN)	2:21:38	Banuelia Katesigwa (TAN)	2:47:49	
6	2010	Peter Limo (KEN)	2:19:44	Divina Jepkosgei (KEN)	2:46:53	
7	2011	Felix Kandie (KEN)	2:17:04	Beatrice Rutto (KEN)	2:51:45	
8	2012	Paul Kosgei (KEN)	2:14:56	Lilian Chelimo (KEN)	2:48:17	
9	2013	Barnabas Kipyego (KEN)	n/a	Tigist Teshome (ETH)	n/a	
10	2014	Wycliffe Biwott (KEN)	2:17:55	Sally Kimaiyo (KEN)	2:44:02	
11	2015	Ezekiel Omullo (KEN)	2:18:15	Peris Toroitich (KEN)	2:47:22	
12	2016	James Tallam (KEN)	2:19:03	Elizabeth Chemweno (KEN)	2:38:20	
13	2017	Gilbert Chumba (KEN)	2:19:49	Beatrice Rutto (KEN)	2:46:38	
14	2018	Elkana Yego (KEN)	2:23:43	Beatrice Rutto (KEN)	2:54:01	
15	2019	Phillip Kiplimo (UGA)	2:20:21	Rebecca Korir (KEN)	2:41:28	
—	2020	cancelled due to coronavirus pandemic				
16	2021.06.20	Derseh Kindie (ETH)	2:23:29	Isgah Cheruto (KEN)	2:51:43	
17	2022.05.29	Wilfred Kigan (KEN)	2:16:36	Margaret Agai (KEN)	2:35:25	
18	2023	George Onyancha (KEN)	2:17:41	Muluhabt Tsega (ETH)	2:35:17	
19	2024	Laban Korir (KEN)	2:16:06	Joan Kipyatich (KEN)	2:33:27	

== See also ==
- Košice Peace Marathon
- World Peace Marathon
