= Bengaluru Marathon =

Annual race in India held since 2014

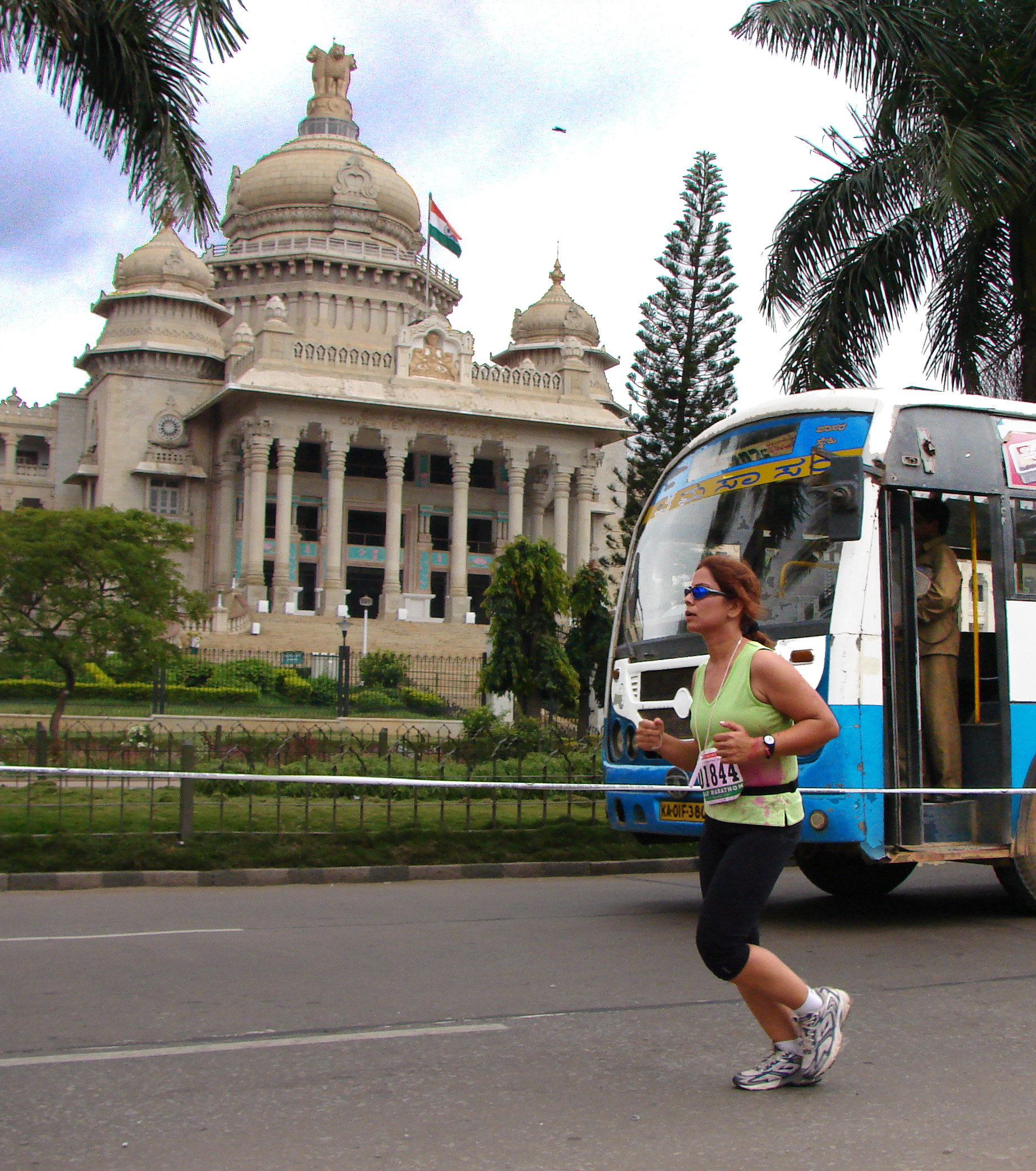
- Running past the Vidhana Soudha in 2006
- Date: October
- Location: Bengaluru, Karnataka, India
- Distance: Marathon
- Primary sponsor: Wipro
- Established: 2005 (21 years ago) (Crossover era); 2014 (12 years ago) (NEB Sports era)
- Course records: Crossover era: Men: 2:22:32 (2007) (Kenya) Eston Nyaga; Women: 2:45:34 (2005) (Ethiopia) Marashet Jimma
- Website: Official website

The Wipro Bengaluru Marathon is an annual marathon running event held in Bengaluru, India.

== History ==
=== Crossover era ===
The inaugural marathon was held on 15 May 2005 as the "Lipton Bangalore International Marathon". Organized by Crossover Consulting, the full marathon race had about 200 participants, with about 400 runners joining the half marathon, and 15,000 taking part in the 7-kilometre (4.3 mi) Celebration Run. The marathon was won by Kennedy Chinna Ramu, a local 28-year-old man, with a time of 2:23:46, nearly five minutes faster than the runner-up.

The second marathon was scheduled for 17 September 2006. The winners were, in the full marathon men's division, H A Chinnappa, with a time of 2:35:19, in the full marathon women's division, Deepthi Ashok, with a time of 4:13:13, in the half marathon men's division, Irappa D Akki, with a time of 1:04:21, and in the half marathon women's division, K B with a time of 1:23:55.

The third edition of the marathon was held as the "BSNL Bangalore International Marathon" on 16 December 2007. Many marathoners, including the lead runners, had to run from barking dogs and take involuntary breaks due to traffic. (Note: Even the marathon's eventual winner was forced to stop for traffic near Ulsoor Lake.)

The Association of Road Racing Statisticians (ARRS) has no record of a marathon occurring in Bengaluru in 2008.

=== NEB Sports era ===
The first marathon of the current era was held on 19 October 2014 as the "Shriram Properties Bengaluru Marathon". It was organized by NEB Sports and members of the running community of Bengaluru.

The 2020 edition of the race was postponed to 24 January 2021 due to the coronavirus pandemic. (Note: It had initially been postponed to 13 December 2020.)

== Course ==
External images
- image icon
- Course map of full marathon in 2019

The marathon is a double-loop course (Note: Half marathoners run the loop once.) that begins and ends in Sree Kanteerava Stadium. The course makes extensive use of Cubbon Park as well as Mahatma Gandhi Road and Cubbon Road.

== Winners ==
Key: Course record (in bold)

=== Crossover era ===
Ed.	Year	Men's Winner	Time	Women's Winner	Time	Rf.
1	2005	Kennedy Chinna Ramu (IND)	2:23:46	Marashet Jimma (ETH)	**2:45:34**	
2	2006	Appachu Chinnappa (IND)	2:25:19	Deepti Ashok (IND)	4:13:13	
3	2007	Eston Nyaga (KEN)	**2:22:32**	none (Note: Both ARRS and the Association of International Marathons and Distance Races record no female finishers for the BSNL Bangalore International Marathon of 2007, although it is unclear if any females started, or if only males were permitted to run.)		

=== NEB Sports era ===
Ed.	Year	Men's Winner	Time	Women's Winner	Time	Rf.
1	2014	Tirath Kumar (IND)	2:25:51	Shamli Singh (IND)	3:16:18	
2	2015	Rashpal Singh (IND)	2:24:22	Jyoti Gawate (IND)	2:56:36	
3	2016	Bahadur Dhoni (IND)	2:29:10	Jyoti Gawate (IND)	2:59:37	
4	2017	Sanjit Luwang (IND)	2:24:56	Jyoti Gawate (IND)	3:07:54	
5	2018	Mikiyas Yemata (ETH)	2:35:20	Aneeta Chaudhary (IND)	3:11:53	
6	2019	Bijay Deka (IND)	2:35:27	KM Laxmi (IND) (Note: Official result of female winner only reports one name.)	3:24:10	
–	2020	postponed due to coronavirus pandemic				
7	2021	Adithya Udupa (IND)	2:51:13	Vandana Arora (IND)	3:28:09	
8	2022	Appachangada Belliappa (IND)	**2:22:03**	Divyanka Chaudhary (IND)	3:32:12	
9	2024	Kartik Kumar (IND)	2:22:50	KM Laxmi (IND)	3:00:21	
10	2025	Pradeep Singh Chaudhary (IND)	2:25:17	Ashwini (IND)	2:56:33	
11	2026	Bugatha Srinu (IND)	2:22:53	Bhagirathi (IND)	3:00:18	
