= Buriram Marathon =

Race in Buriram, Thailand

- Date: later January
- Location: Buriram, Thailand
- Event type: Road
- Distance: Marathon, Half marathon, 10 km
- Primary sponsor: Chang
- Established: 2017
- Course records: Men: 2:10:23 (Kenya) David Barmasai (2020); Women: 2:37:52 (Kenya) Sharon Cherop (2020)
- Website: Buriram Marathon
- Participants: 3,390 finishers (2022); 4,291 (2021); 5,218 (2020); 6,548 (2019); 3,581 (2018); 1,220 (2017)

The Buriram Marathon is held every February at the Chang International Circuit in Buriram, northeastern Thailand. Its title sponsor is Chang Beer. The marathon events are regularly attended by elite runners from Thailand, Laos, Ethiopia, Kenya, and other countries.

== History ==
The Buriram Marathon was founded by Newin Chidchob, the President of Buriram United and Executive of Chang International Circuit.

The inaugural event was launched in 2017. More than 24,000 runners participated in the 3rd Buriram Marathon in 2019, which was marked by much higher than usual humidity and temperatures.

== Past winners ==
Key: Course record

=== Marathon ===
Edition	Year	Men's winner	Time (h:m:s)	Women's winner	Time (h:m:s)
1st	2017	Cosmas Kyeva (KEN)	2:17:00	Yeshumie Ayalew (ETH)	2:40:57
2nd	2018	Nicholas Kirwa (KEN)	2:21:03	Joan Rotich (KEN)	2:48:49
3rd	2019	Armon Kemei (KEN)	2:17:50	Pauline Njeri (KEN)	2:38:38
4th	2020	Cornelius Kibiwott (KEN)	2:11:46	Immaculate Chemutai (UGA)	2:32:41
5th	2021	Sergey Zyryanov (RUS)	2:35:02	Rabeang Rangphia (THA)	3:14:57
6th	2022	Sergey Zyryanov (RUS)	2:28:22	Aleksandra Morozova (RUS)	2:52:13
7th	2023	Titus Kimutai (KEN)	2:08:57	Agnes Keino (KEN)	2:28:08
8th	2024	Mathew Samperu (KEN)	2:09:54	Sharon Chelimo (KEN)	2:27:59

=== Half marathon ===
Edition	Year	Men's winner	Time (h:m:s)	Women's winner	Time (h:m:s)
1st	2017	Kenneth Rotich (KEN)	1:04:07	Gedamnesh Yayeh (ETH)	1:15:09
2nd	2018	Josphat Too (KEN)	1:03:14	Immaculate Chemutai (UGA)	1:21:02
3rd	2019	Kenneth Rotich (KEN)	1:07:26	Natthaya Thanaronnawat (THA)	1:28:22
4th	2020	Mathew Samperu (KEN)	1:03:46	Esther Karimi (KEN)	1:16:26
5th	2021	Nattawut Innum (THA)	1:11:48	Natthaya Thanaronnawat (THA)	1:26:55
6th	2022	Nattawut Innum (THA)	1:08:35	Ornanong Wongsorn (THA)	1:26:06
7th	2023	James Karanja (KEN)	1:05:02	Ornanong Wongsorn (THA)	1:21:27
8th	2024	Anderson Seroi (KEN)	1:04:07	Tsega Desta (ETH)	1:16:04

=== 10 km ===
Edition	Year	Men's winner	Time (h:m:s)	Women's winner	Time (h:m:s)
1st	2017	James Karanja (KEN)	31:09	Lodkeo Inthakoumman (LAO)	36:46
2nd	2018	Laban Moiben (KEN)	28:59.5	Lodkeo Inthakoumman (LAO)	37:23.2
3rd	2019	Nattawat Innum (THA)	32:55	Lodkeo Inthakoumman (LAO)	38:20
4th	2020	James Karanja (KEN)	30:13	Woraphan Nuanlsri (THA)	38:29
5th	2021	Nattawut Innum (THA)	32:02	Saranya Buaphrai (THA)	38:00
6th	2022	Arthit Soda (THA)	32:13	Saranya Buaphrai (THA)	37:28
7th	2023	Nattawut Innum (THA)	32:10	Khemjira Chua-in (THA)	39:20
8th	2024	Deresa Fikadu (ETH)	32:18	Alemtsehay Adbaru (ETH)	34:52
