= Bratislava Marathon =

Annual race in Slovakia since 2006

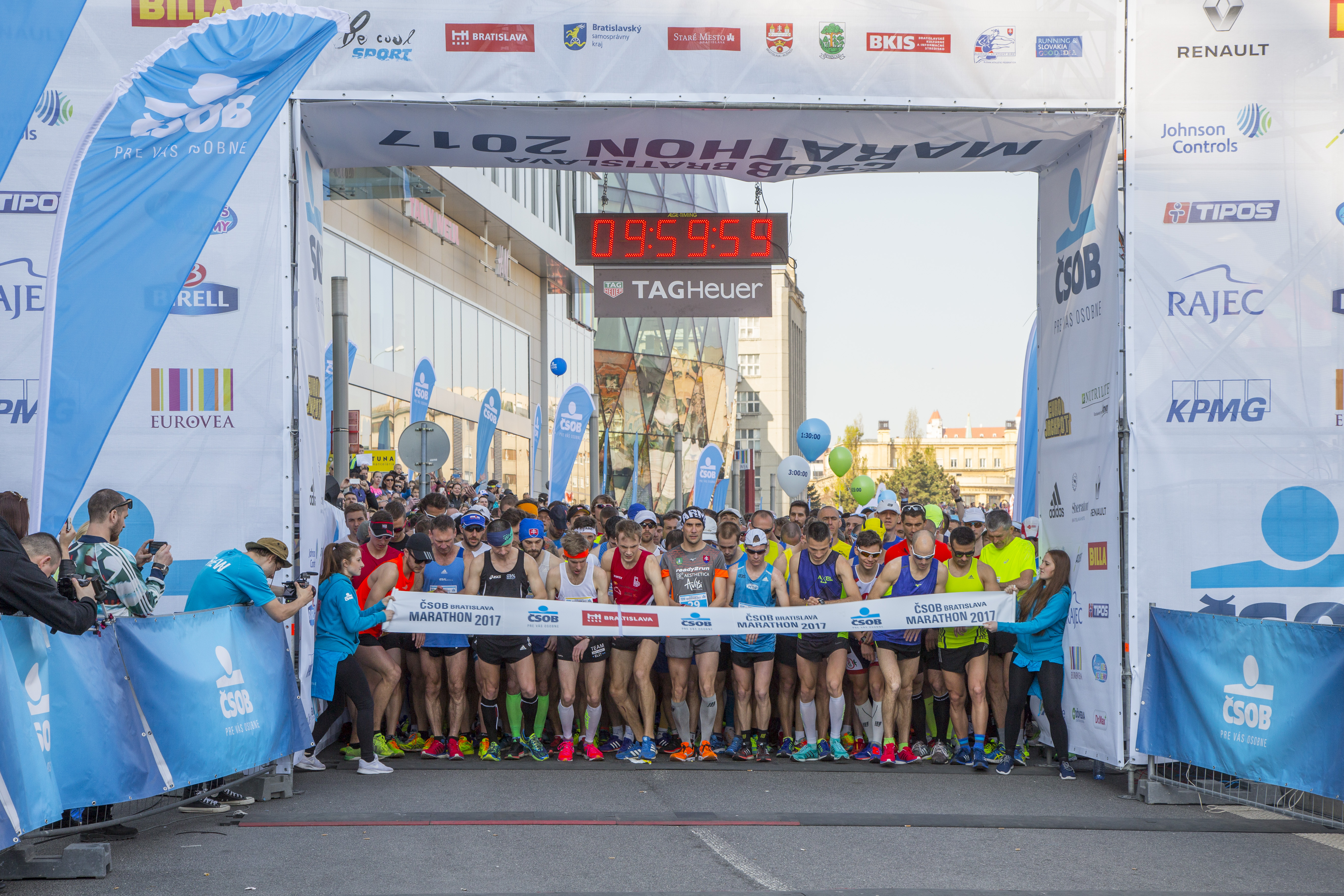
- Marathon start in front of the Eurovea complex, 2017
- Date: April
- Location: Bratislava, Slovakia
- Event type: Road
- Distance: Marathon, half marathon, 10K run, 4.2K run
- Primary sponsor: ČSOB
- Established: 2006 (20 years ago) (current era)
- Course records: Men's: 2:17:18 (2015) (Kenya) Hosea Tuwei; Women's: 2:35:35 (2015) (Kenya) Hellen Kimutai
- Website: Bratislava Marathon

The Bratislava Marathon (also known as the Bratislava City Marathon, as well as the ČSOB Bratislava Marathon for sponsorship reasons (Note: Československá obchodní banka (ČSOB) has had naming rights since 2008.)), is an annual road-based marathon hosted by Bratislava, Slovakia. The current version of the marathon has been held since 2006, although the first marathon to be held regularly in Bratislava was inaugurated in 1932.

The marathon is a World Athletics Label Road Race and a member of the Association of International Marathons and Distance Races (AIMS). During the race weekend, a half marathon, a 10K run, a 4.2K run are also offered. A relay option is also offered for the full and half marathon distances.

== List of winners ==
| Edition | Year | Men's winner | Time (m:s) | Women's winner | Time (m:s) |
|---|---|---|---|---|---|
| 1st | 2006 | Bogdan Dziuba (POL) | 2:33:08 | Andrea Berešová (SVK) | 3:10:43 |
| 2nd | 2007 | Artur Błasiński (POL) | 2:25:09 | Dana Janecková (SVK) | 2:56:22 |
| 3rd | 2008 | Vasiliy Remschuk (UKR) | 2:19:42 | Katalin Farkas (HUN) | 2:56:29 |
| 4th | 2009 | Aleksei Haurychenka (BLR) | 2:21:40 | Judit Földing-Nagy (HUN) | 2:50:21 |
| 5th | 2010 | Edwin Kibowen (KEN) | 2:27:38 | Lilian Koech (KEN) | 2:51:15 |
| 6th | 2011 | Ashenafi Erkoló (HUN) | 2:22:09 | Lilian Koech (KEN) | 2:45:30 |
| 7th | 2012 | Micah Samoei (KEN) | 2:21:09 | Lucy Murigi (KEN) | 2:42:41 |
| 8th | 2013 | Isaac Cheruiyot (KEN) | 2:18:33 | Lilian Koech (KEN) | 2:51:42 |
| 9th | 2014 | Joel Maina (KEN) | 2:18:22 | Alice Jepkemboi (KEN) | 2:42:55 |
| 10th | 2015 | Hosea Tuwei (KEN) | 2:17:18 | Hellen Kimutai (KEN) | 2:35:35 |
| 11th | 2016 | Jiří Čípa (CZE) | 2:27:41 | Zsófia Bódi (HUN) | 3:12:39 |
| 12th | 2017 | Jozef Urban (SVK) | 2:29:44 | Michaela Mertová (CZE) | 2:51:49 |
| 13th | 2018 | Jiří Čípa (CZE) | 2:22:16 | Kristína Néč-Lapinová (SVK) | 2:58:41 |
| 14th | 2019 | Sławomir Gawlik (POL) | 2:37:17 | Barbora Nováková (CZE) | 3:00:27 |
| 15th | 2021 | Miroslav Ilavský (SVK) | '2:34:19 | Barbora Nováková (CZE) | 3:04:15 |
| 16th | 2022 | Taras Ivaniuta (UKR) | 2:27:04 | Yuliia Tarasova (UKR) | 2:54:54 |
| 17th | 2023 | Taras Ivaniuta (UKR) | 2:22:23 | Ines Jozić (CRO) | 2:59:29 |
| 18th | 2024 | Paweł Kosek (POL) | 2:25:32 | Nataša Šustić (CRO) | 2:49:02 |

=== Wins by country ===
| Country | Men's | Women's | Total |
|---|---|---|---|
| Kenya | 5 | 6 | 11 |
| Czech Republic | 2 | 3 | 5 |
| Slovakia | 2 | 3 | 5 |
| Hungary | 1 | 3 | 4 |
| Poland | 4 | 0 | 4 |
| Ukraine | 3 | 1 | 4 |
| Croatia | 0 | 2 | 2 |
| Belarus | 1 | 0 | 1 |
