= Bangsaen21 Half Marathon =

Race in Bang Saen, Thailand

- Date: December
- Location: Bang Saen Beach, Thailand
- Event type: Road
- Distance: Half marathon
- Established: 2005
- Course records: Men: 1:01:56 (2022) (Kenya) Josphat Kemei; Women: 1:07:45 (2022) (Kenya) Hellen Obiri
- Website: www.bangsaen21.com
- Participants: 5,255 finishers (2022); 7,421 finishers (2020); 10,426 (2019); 7,871 (2018); 5,680 (2017); 4,359 (2016); 699 (2015)

The Bangsaen21 Half Marathon is an annual half marathon held in Bang Saen, Chonburi Province, Thailand. It is an IAAF Platinum Label race. It is currently the only half marathon in Thailand with the IAAF Bronze Label. The race is organized by MICE & Communication, a Bangkok-based event management company.

== Past winners ==
Key: Course record

Edition	Year	Men's winner	Time (h:m:s)	Women's winner	Time (h:m:s)	Ref.
1st	2015	Craig Sauers (USA)	1:19:52	Yuyurn Boonyada (THA)	1:34:43	
2nd	2016	Abera Tariku (ETH)	1:08:13	Tanaphon Assawawongcharoen (THA)	1:27:08	
3rd	2017	Sisay Fekadu (ETH)	1:05:57	Emebet Tadesse (ETH)	1:18:06	
4th	2018	Jamin Ekai (ETH)	1:04:55	Chemtai Rionotukei (KEN)	1:15:32	
5th	2019	Sisay Lemma (ETH)	1:02:16	Shitaye Eshete (BHR)	1:11:11	
6th	2020	Nattawut Innum (THA)	1:07:45	Linda Janthachit (THA)	1:22:15	
7th	2021	Nattawut Innum (THA)	1:11:40	Linda Janthachit (THA)	1:24:57	
8th	2022	Josphat Kemei (KEN)	1:01:56	Hellen Obiri (KEN)	1:07:45	
9th	2023	Mathew Kipkorir Kimeli (KEN)	1:03:39	Gladys Chepkurui (KEN)	1:09:46	
10th	2024	Nibret Melak (ETH)	1:02:32	Winfridah Moraa Moseti (KEN)	1:10:01	
11th	2025	Samwel Mailu (KEN)	1:02:59	Dolphine Nyaboke Omare (KEN)	1:10:14	
