= Issyk-Kul Marathon =

Annual race in Kyrgyzstan since 2012

- Date: May
- Location: Cholpon-Ata, Issyk-Kul, Issyk-Kul, Kyrgyzstan
- Event type: Road
- Distance: Marathon, half marathon, 10K, 3K
- Established: 2012 (14 years ago)
- Website: https://runthesilkroad.com

The Issyk-Kul Marathon (Note: The marathon is also known by a number of other names that may omit the hyphen and may also mention one or more of the following: "International", "Run the Silk Road", "Shanghai Cooperation Organization", and "SCO". The official website for the marathon states that the English name for the race is "Issyk Kul SCO Run the Silk Road marathon".) is an annual road-based marathon hosted by Cholpon-Ata, Kyrgyzstan, since 2012. The marathon is a World Athletics Label Road Race. During the race weekend, a half marathon, a 10K race, and a 3K race are also offered.
