= Tashkent Marathon =

Annual race in Uzbekistan since 2019

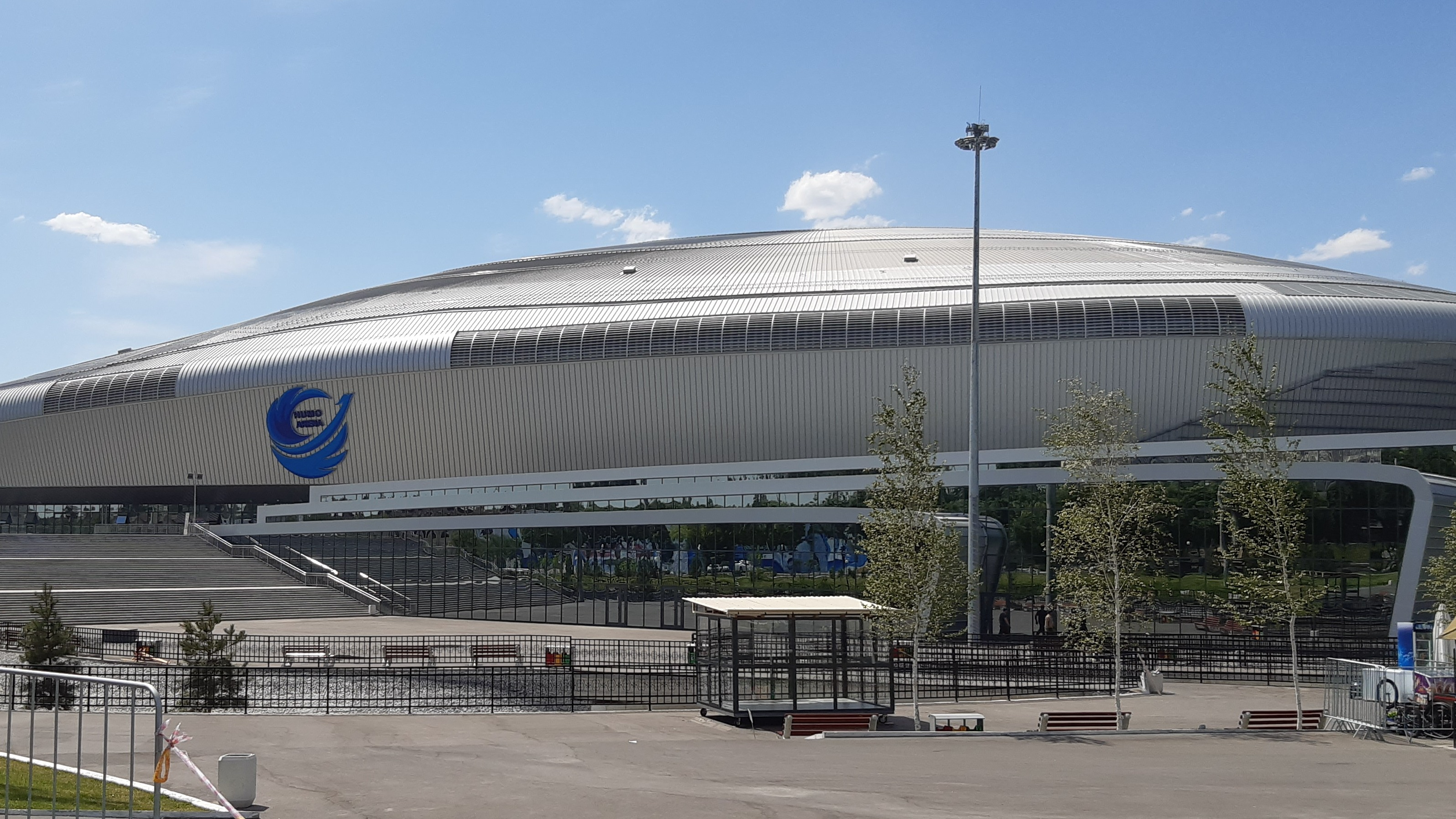
- Humo Arena, near the start and finish area
- Date: April
- Location: Tashkent, Uzbekistan
- Event type: Road
- Distance: Marathon
- Established: 2019 (7 years ago)
- Website: "Tashkent Marathon". Archived from the original on April 24, 2022.

The Tashkent Marathon (also known as the Tashkent International Marathon (Note: Sources, including the race site itself, inconsistently switch between "Tashkent International Marathon" and "International Tashkent Marathon".) or the Nowruz International Marathon; Uzbek: Toshkent xalqaro marafoni) is an annual road-based marathon hosted by Tashkent, Uzbekistan, since 2019. It is a World Athletics Label Road Race. During the race weekend, a half marathon, a 10K, and a marathon-length ekiden are also offered.

== History ==
The inaugural race was held on 24 March 2019 as a half marathon. (Note: This race has also been referred to as "a marathon at a distance of 21,095 meters", which is the length of a half marathon.)

The 2022 edition of the marathon was held concurrently with a half marathon hosted by the Shanghai Cooperation Organisation. This was also the first edition that World Athletics granted the race its Label Road Race status. In addition, following Russia's invasion of Ukraine that began about a month earlier, Russian runners were banned from the event. (Note: World Athletics had banned Russian athletes from a number of its own races, but its ban had not applied to the Label Road Races.)

== Course ==
External image
- Course map of full marathon in 2022

The course begins outside Humo Arena, runs counterclockwise on a roughly circular route around the center of the city, and turns around after a quarter-marathon, shortly before the circle is completed. Marathoners then run back to the start along largely the same route. This loop is then repeated to complete the marathon distance.

== Winners ==
Ed.	Date	Male Winner	Time	Female Winner	Time	Rf.
3	2021.03.28	Vladislav Mamedov (UZB)	2:22:25	Mariya Korobitskaya (KGZ)	2:32:22	
4	2022.03.27	Ilya Tyapkin (KGZ)	2:21:42	Gulshanoi Satarova (KGZ)	2:34:40	
5	2023.03.12	Bakhiyer Utkirov (UZB)	2:20:14	Gulshanoi Satarova (KGZ)	2:46:34	
6	2024.04.21	Uladzislau Pramau (BLR)	2:18:39	Yekaterina Tunguskova (UZB)	2:40:58	
