= Lodkeo Inthakoumman =

Laotian long-distance runner

Personal information
- Nationality: Laotian
- Born: 5 September 1995 (age 30)
- Education: National University of Laos, Faculty of Forestry

Sport
- Sport: Athletics
- Event(s): Half marathon, 10 km

Achievements and titles
- Personal best: 36:46 (2017 Buriram Marathon 10 km)
Medal record
Representing Laos
SEA Games
Bronze medal – third place	2017 Kuala Lumpur	1500m
Bronze medal – third place	2013 Naypyidaw	10,000m

Lodkeo Inthakoumman (born 5 September 1995) is a Laotian long-distance runner. She currently holds various Laotian national records in athletics.

== Honours ==
- SEA Games: (bronze) bronze : 2013, 2017
