= Sunshine Coast Marathon =

Road running event in Queensland, Australia

- Date: August
- Location: Sunshine Coast, Australia
- Event type: Road
- Distance: Marathon
- Primary sponsor: EVA Air
- Established: 2012
- Course records: Men's: 2:14:05 (2025) (Australia) Ryan Gregson; Women's: 2:37:07 (2024) (Australia) Milly Clark
- Website: Sunshine Coast Marathon
- Participants: 2,485 finishers (2025)

The Sunshine Coast Marathon is part of the 'Sunshine Coast marathon and community run festival' located on the Sunshine Coast of Queensland. The festival also incorporates a full marathon, half marathon, 10k run, 5k run and a 2k fun run. It is an annual event held in August and was first run in 2012. The marathon starts and ends at the 'Alexandra Headland Surf Life Saving Club'. The picturesque route loops along Alexandra Headland, Mooloolaba & Maroochydore beachfronts.

The marathon course is IAAF-AIMS certified and accepted as a Boston Marathon qualifier.

== Results ==
Race record in bold

Edition	Year	Men's winner	Time (h:m:s)	Women's winner	Time (h:m:s)
13th	2025	Ryan Gregson (AUS)	**2:14:05**	Sarah Short (AUS)	2:41:12
12th	2024	Robert Collins (AUS)	2:27:51	Milly Clark (AUS)	**2:37:07**
11th	2023	Jason Hunt (AUS)	2:28:57	Beth McKenzie (USA)	2:39:54
10th	2022	Robert Collins (AUS)	2:26:12	Tamara Carvolth (AUS)	2:45:21
9th	2021	Isaias Beyn (AUS)	2:24:47	Riine Ringi (AUS)	2:42:37
8th	2019	Saeki Makino (JPN)	2:16:18	Lydia O'Donnell (NZL)	2:41:14
7th	2018	Chris Rancie (AUS)	2:27:23	Eleanor Goldrick (AUS)	2:59:25
6th	2017	Clay Dawson (AUS)	2:27:30	Elkie Belcher (AUS)	2:42:35
5th	2016	Samuel Woldeamanuel (ETH)	2:22:16	Clare Geraghty (AUS)	2:50:47
4th	2015	Samuel Woldeamanuel (ETH)	2:18:30	Fiona Kupresanin (AUS)	3:00:59
3rd	2014	Andrew Kimanthi (KEN)	2:20:32	Roxie Fraser (AUS)	2:52:46
2nd	2013	Brendon Seipolt (AUS)	2:45:02	Roxie Fraser (AUS)	2:55:08
1st	2012	Adam Fitzakerley (AUS)	2:29:27	Roxie Fraser (AUS)	2:49:43

== See also ==
- List of marathon races in Oceania
