= Mersin Marathon =

- Date: Early december
- Location: Mersin
- Event type: Road
- Distance: Marathon
- Established: 2015; 11 years ago
- Course records: Men: 2:10:12 (2018) (Kenya) Kenneth Kiplagat; Women: 2:28:47 (2017) (Ethiopia) Truphena Chepchirchir
- Website: Mersin Marathon
- Participants: 230 (2018)

The Mersin Marathon (Turkish: Mersin Maratonu) is an annual road running event over the marathon distance, which is held in December in Mersin in Mersin Province Turkey. The event also features a 15-kilometre race.

Mersin Marathon was established in 2015 and it is hosted by the Mersin Metropolitan Municipality.

== Past winners ==
Key: Course record

| Edition | Year | Men's winner | Time (h:m:s) | Women's winner | Time (h:m:s) |
|---|---|---|---|---|---|
| 1st | 2015 | Sulti Gure (ETH) | 2:26:54 | Svetlana Șepelev-Tcaci (MDA) | 3:09:06 |
| 2nd | 2016 | Moses Too (KEN) | 2:14:27 | Jedidah Karungu (KEN) | 2:40:54 |
| 3rd | 2017 | Hassane Ahouchar (MAR) | 2:11:21 | Truphena Chepchirchir (KEN) | 2:28:47 |
| 4th | 2018 | Kenneth Kiplagat (KEN) | 2:10:12 | Biruk Tilahun (ETH) | 2:33:18 |
