= Durban Marathon =

Annual race in South Africa since 2021

- Date: Autumn
- Location: Durban, South Africa
- Event type: Road
- Distance: Marathon, 10K
- Established: 2021 (5 years ago)
- Course records: Men's: 2:08:43 (2021) (Kenya) Samuel Naibei; Women's: 2:29:46 (2024) (South Africa) Cian Oldknow
- Website: Official website

The Durban Marathon (also known as the Durban International Marathon) is an annual road-based marathon hosted by Durban, South Africa, since 2021. The marathon is a World Athletics Label Road Race. During the race weekend, a 10K race is also offered.

== History ==
The inaugural race was held on 5 September 2021. The marathon was won by Kenyan runner Samuel Naibei and South African runner Zinhle Shabalala, with finish times of 2:08:43 and 2:44:00, respectively.

During the 2022 race, Zimbabwean runner Isaac Mpofu, who crossed the finish line first, was disqualified because he was wearing only one bib number when the rules of the marathon required runners to wear two bibs: one on the front and one on the back. Mpofu stated that he was surprised to be disqualified because, after he had discovered on the morning of the race that his sealed race packet only contained one bib number, the race judge had confirmed that Mpofu could compete. Mpofu's time was later reinstated, which allowed him to qualify for the 2022 World Athletics Championships where he set a new Zimbabwean record for the marathon, but he was still required to forfeit the 50,000 ZAR that he would have won in Durban had he worn two bibs during the race.

== Winners ==
Ed.	Date	Male Winner	Time	Female Winner	Time	Rf.
1	2021.09.05	Samuel Naibei (KEN)	2:08:43	Zinhle Shabalala (ZAF)	2:44:00	
3	2023.03.12	Tebello Ramakongoana (LSO)	2:10:11	Annie Bothma (ZAF)	2:30:31	
4	2024.04.28	Elroy Gelant (RSA)	2:09:32	Cian Oldknow (RSA)	2:29:46	

== See also ==
- Comrades Marathon
