= Castellón Marathon =

Annual race in Spain since 2010

- Date: February
- Location: Castellón de la Plana, Spain
- Event type: Road
- World Athletics Cat.: Label
- Distance: Marathon, 10K
- Primary sponsor: BP, FACSA
- Established: 2010 (16 years ago)
- Website: Official website

The Castellón Marathon (Catalan: Marató Castelló; (Note: It is also known as the "Marató BP Castelló" (stylized as "Marató bp Castelló") for sponsorship reasons.) Spanish: Maratón Castellón) is an annual road-based marathon hosted by Castellón de la Plana, Spain, since 2010. The marathon is a World Athletics Label Road Race.

The marathon is held on the same day as the 10K Castellón (Catalan: 10K Castelló; (Note: It is also known as the "10K FACSA Castelló" for sponsorship reasons.) Spanish: 10K Castellón), a 10K race that is also a World Athletics Label Road Race. Ethiopian runner Yalemzerf Yehualaw set a world record for the 10K run during this race in 2022, when she completed the course in a time of 29:14. (Note: This world record was broken at the 2024 10K Valencia Ibercaja by Kenyan runner Agnes Ngetich, who finished with a time of 28:46.)

== Winners ==
Key: Course record

Edition	Year	Men's winner	Time (min:sec)	Women's winner	Time (h:m:s)
1st	2010	Solomon Tsige (ETH)	2:10:37	Almaz Alemu (ETH)	2:31:27
2nd	2011	Carles Castillejo (ESP)	2:10:09	Jemima Sumgong (KEN)	2:28:32
3rd	2012	Simon Kamama (KEN)	2:11:32	Leah Jerotich (KEN)	2:42:14
4th	2013	Andualem Belay (ETH)	2:11:59	Marta Markos (ETH)	2:36:14
5th	2014	Daniel Kosgei (KEN)	2:10:13	Magdalene Mukunzi (KEN)	2:35:38
6th	2015	Tiruneh Chalachew (ETH)	2:12:04	Berhan Aregawi (ETH)	2:36:31
7th	2017	Abraham Girma (ETH)	2:12:18	Genet Getaneh (ETH)	2:36:49
8th	2018	Stephen Kiplimo (KEN)	2:11:28	Tigist Teshome (ETH)	2:29:57
9th	2019	Andualem Belay (ETH)	2:08:16	Lemelem Berha (ETH)	2:28:52
10th	2020	Lemi Dumecha (ETH)	2:07:43	Webalem Bazanew (ETH)	2:27:39
11th	2022	Ronald Korir (KEN)	2:09:25	Betty Jepleting (KEN)	2:28:06
12th	2023	Dadi Yami (ETH)	2:11:15	Amina Bettiche (ALG)	2:28:30
13th	2024	Kibrom Weldemicael (ERI)	2:07:25	Dorine Murkomen (KEN)	2:29:39

=== Wins by country ===
Country	Men's	Women's	Total
Ethiopia	7	7	14
Kenya	4	5	9
Algeria	0	1	1
Eritrea	1	0	1
Spain	1	0	1
