= Kobe Marathon =

Marathon held annually in Kobe, Hyōgo Prefecture, Japan

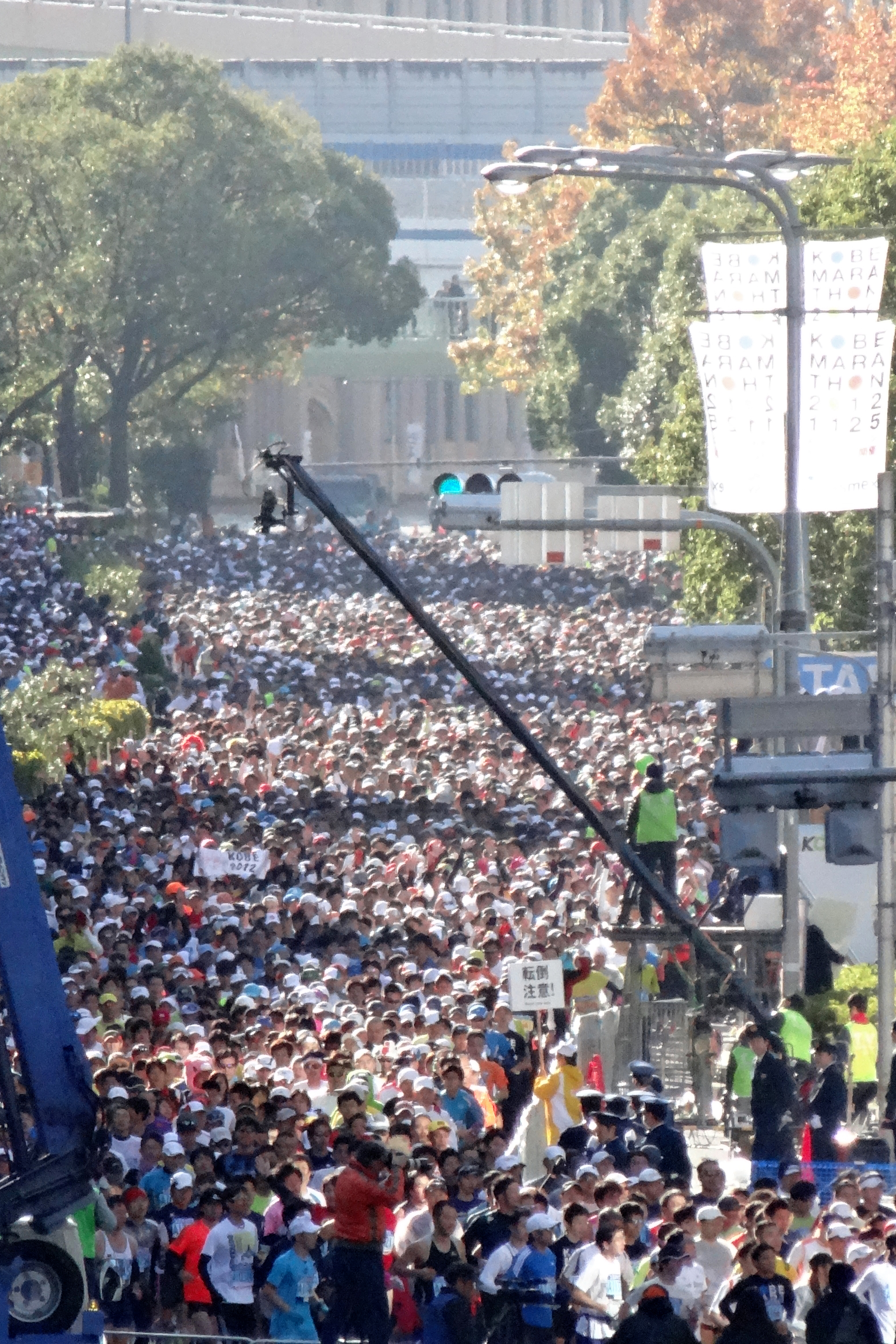
- Sannomiya start point
- Date: November
- Location: Kobe, Japan
- Event type: Road
- Distance: Marathon
- Primary sponsor: Sysmex
- Established: 2011
- Course records: Men: 2:08:46 (2019) (Uganda) Geofrey Kusuro; Women: 2:27:39 (2019) (Japan) Haruka Yamaguchi
- Website: Kobe Marathon
- Participants: 19,448 (2019); 19,569 (2018)

The Kobe Marathon (神戸マラソン, Kōbe Marason) is an annual marathon sporting event for men and women over the classic distance of 42.195 kilometres which is held in mid November in Kobe, Hyōgo Prefecture, Japan.

Before of race start of first edition 2011, a stone monument was unveiled to commemorate the first ever marathon held in Japan, the Marathon Great Race held in Kobe on March 21, 1909.

== History ==
The race was first held in 2011.

The 2020 edition of the race was cancelled due to the coronavirus pandemic, with all registrants automatically receiving full refunds.

== Course ==
The race begins in front of Kobe City Hall, passes through Takatori district, and after crossing and turning around in the West side of Akashi Kaikyo Bridge heads for to Komagayashi / Wada Cape area, where the finish line is located near the citizen's square of Port Island.

== Winners ==
Key: Course record

Edition	Year	Men's winner	Time (h:m:s)	Women's winner	Time (h:m:s)
1st	2011	Takuya Nakayama (JPN)	2:24:13	Satoko Uetani (JPN)	2:40:45
2nd	2012	Kensuke Takahashi (JPN)	2:21:13	Yui Ouchi (JPN)	2:39:52
3rd	2013	Hironori Arai (JPN)	2:17:01	Chihiro Tanaka (JPN)	2:36:53
4th	2014	Harun Malel (KEN)	2:13:45	Hiromi Saitô (JPN)	2:38:24
5th	2015	Tadashi Suzuki (JPN)	2:18:01	Yuri Sugiyama (JPN)	2:42:01
6th	2016	Morris Mwangi (KEN)	2:22:31	Jacqueline Kiplimo (KEN)	2:40:07
7th	2017	Khalil Lemciyeh (MAR)	2:12:42	Maegan Krifchin (USA)	2:33:14
8th	2018	Khalil Lemciyeh (MAR)	2:13:54	Susan Jerotich (KEN)	2:31:38
9th	2019	Geofrey Kusuro (UGA)	2:08:46	Haruka Yamaguchi (JPN)	2:27:39
	2020	cancelled due to coronavirus pandemic			

=== Multiple wins ===
Men's
Athlete	Wins	Years
Khalil Lemciyeh (MAR)	2	2017, 2018

=== By country ===
Country	Total	Men's	Women's
Japan	10	4	6
Kenya	4	2	2
Morocco	2	2	0
United States	1	0	1
Uganda	1	1	0
