= Doha Marathon =

Annual race in Qatar since 2013

- Date: January
- Location: Doha, Qatar
- Event type: Road
- Distance: Marathon, half marathon, 10K, 5K
- Established: 2013 (13 years ago)
- Course records: Men: 2:06:49 (Morocco) Mouhcine Outalha (2023); Women: 2:20:46 (Ethiopia) Meseret Belete (2023)
- Website: Official website

The Doha Marathon (also known as the Ooredoo Doha Marathon for sponsorship reasons) is an annual road-based marathon hosted by Doha, Qatar, since 2013. (Note: The event was held as a half marathon during its inaugural year.) The marathon is a World Athletics Elite Label Road Race. During the race weekend, a half marathon, a 10K race, and a 5K race are also offered.

== History ==
The inaugural race was held on 26 January 2013 as a half marathon event. More than 300 runners participated in the half marathon, which started at the Museum of Islamic Art and ran along the Corniche and back. The half marathon was won by Ethiopian runner Gadissa Chaniada and British runner Rebecca Botwright.

The 2023 edition of the marathon is the first edition of the race listed as an Elite Label Road Race by World Athletics.

== List of winners ==
Edition	Year	Men's winner	Time (m:s)	Women's winner	Time (m:s)
1st	2014	Eskindeer Folie (ETH)	2:49:49	Sarah Whittington (GBR)	3:23:11
2nd	2015	Roba Gari (ETH)	2:22:18	Sally Kimaiyo (KEN)	2:41:26
3rd	2016	Amos Mayo (KEN)	2:21:21	Pamela Chepkoech (KEN)	2:58:41
4th	2017	Henry Kiplagat (KEN)	2:16:11	Georgina Rono (KEN)	2:38:14
5th	2018	Collins Chebii (KEN)	2:16:22	Joan Rotich (KEN)	2:46:24
6th	2019	Collins Chebii (KEN)	2:24:27	Caroline Drew (GBR)	3:13:41
7th	2020	Anouar El Ghouz (MAR)	2:17:10	Sheila Chesang (KEN)	2:40:33
8th	2022	Oussama Zeroual (MAR)	2:38:44	Rossyle Ayuro (PHI)	3:37:49
9th	2023	Mouhcine Outalha (MAR)	2:06:49	Meseret Belete (ETH)	2:20:46
10th	2024	Solomon Mutai (UGA)	2:12:48	Valary Jemeli (KEN)	2:23:38

=== Wins by country ===
Country	Men's	Women's	Total
Kenya	4	6	10
Ethiopia	2	1	3
Morocco	3	0	3
Great Britain	0	2	2
Philippines	0	1	1
Uganda	1	0	1

== See also ==
- 2006 Asian Games
- 2019 World Athletics Championships
