= Nattawut Innum =

Thai long-distance runner

Personal information
- Nationality: Thai
- Born: February 2, 1994 (age 31)

Sport
- Country: Thailand
- Sport: Athletics
- Event: Long distance running

Nattawut Innum (Thai: ณัฐวุฒิ อินนุ่ม) is a Thai long-distance runner.

He has a twin brother, Nattawat Innum (ณัฐวัฒน์ อินนุ่ม), who is also a runner.

On February 11, 2018, Nattawut Innum ran 29:48 for the 10K run at Buriram, Thailand, setting a new Thai national record for the 10 km road race.
