= Nanjing Marathon =

Annual footrace

南京馬拉松
- Date: November
- Location: Nanjing, Jiangsu, China
- Event type: Road
- Distance: Half-marathon, Marathon
- Established: November 29, 2015; 10 years ago
- Course records: Half-Marathon（Women）：China 蘇雪婷 1:17:55 （2016）; Half-Marathon（Men）：China 李子成 1:06:11 （2017）; Full-Marathon（Women）：Kenya Hellen Wanjiku Mugo 2:39:59 （2016）; Full-Marathon（Men）：Kenya Samuel Kiptanui Maswai 2:11:44 （2015）
- Website: http://www.nj-marathon.org

The Nanjing Marathon is a World Athletics bronze label road race organized by the Chinese Athletics Association, Jiangsu Provincial Sports Bureau, and Nanjing Provincial People's Government.

== History ==
=== 2015 ===
The first competition was held on November 29, starting at 8:30AM. The marathon course runs through Qinhuai River, City Wall of Nanjing and Yangtze River. The course provides full-marathon, half-marathon and mini-marathon(5KM). A total of 16,000 participants entered for the competition this year, 2,000 of full-marathon, 4,000 of half-marathon, 10,000 of mini-marathon. The runners KIPTANUI from Kenya with a win in 2:11:44 of the men's field. The runners TUFA from Ethiopia with a win in 2:24:37 of the women's field.

=== 2016 ===
A total of 21,000 participants entered for the competition this year. Asian runners were on the wrong path in this competition. The runners from Mongolia with a win in 2:31:37 of the full-marathon.

=== 2017 ===
A total of 28,000 participants entered for the competition this year. The marathon started at Nanjing Olympic Sports Center in 15 October 7:30AM. The runners from Kenya with a win in 2:20:27 of the full-marathon.

=== 2018 ===
A total of 28,000 participants entered for the competition this year. The marathon started at Nanjing Olympic Sports Center in 4 November 7:30AM. In order to encourage China's runners to participate this year, the organizer specially added the "China Athlete's Record Breaking Award". Any China's runner who participates in the full-marathon event, as long as it breaks the record from 2014 to 2017 announced by the Chinese Marathon platform, will receive a prize of $20,000.

=== 2019 ===
A total of 28,000 participants entered for the competition this year.

=== 2020 ===
A total of 10,000 participants entered for the competition this year, because of COVID-19. The marathon started at Nanjing Olympic Sports Center in 29 November 7:30AM.
