= Association of International Marathons and Distance Races =

The Association of International Marathons and Distance Races, also known as AIMS, is an association of the organisers of long-distance road running races. It was founded in 1982 at a meeting in London of marathon race directors. Its membership was extended in 1986 to include all road races. In June 2016, over 400 race organisations were members.

== Objectives ==
According to its Articles of Association, AIMS' objectives are:

1. to foster and promote distance running throughout the world;
2. to work with the World Athletics on all matters relating to international road races, and;
3. to exchange information, knowledge and expertise among the members of the Association.

== Course measurement and world records ==
AIMS works together with World Athletics to ensure that its road races are measured accurately. All AIMS races must be measured by an accredited AIMS/IAAF course measurer. In addition, in order for a road race world record to be ratified by IAAF, it must satisfy certain conditions. Among these are that:

- a course must not be, from start to finish, downhill by more than 1 metre in height per kilometre of length
- the separation between start and finish must not be more than 50% of the length of the course

The second condition is intended to ensure that a course is not designed in such a way that a tail wind may improve times unduly, but does not apply for the purpose of establishing Olympic and World Championship qualifying times.

All races which have obtained World Athletics Label Road Races have been subject to AIMS/WA course measurement standards.

== Other activities ==
The magazine Distance Running is published four times a year and distributed free to runners at events organised by AIMS members.

Since 2013 the organisation has hosted a gala dinner each year at which the Best Marathon Runner award is given to honour the year’s most outstanding distance athletes. There is also a Green Award and a Social Award.

== See also ==
- List of World Athletics Label marathon races
- World Marathon Majors
- World Athletics Label Road Races
- Short course prevention factor
