= Sorome Negash =

Ethiopian long-distance runner

Personal information
- Nationality: Ethiopian
- Born: 25 November 1997 (age 28)

Sport
- Sport: Athletics
- Event(s): Marathon, Long-distance running

Sorome Negash (born 25 November 1997), also known as Amente Sorome Negash, is an Ethiopian long-distance runner who specializes in the marathon. She is a former winner of the Dublin Marathon.

== Career ==
In October 2023, Negash won the Dublin Marathon with a time of 2:26:22, a personal best at the time.

Earlier that year, she placed ninth at the Standard Chartered Dubai Marathon, recording a time of 2:26:40.

At the 2024 edition of the Dublin Marathon, Negash returned as the defending champion and finished second, improving her personal best to 2:24:45. She was narrowly beaten by fellow Ethiopian runner Asmirach Nega, who set a new course record.

== Major competition results ==
Competition	Position	Event	Time	Notes
2023 Standard Chartered Dubai Marathon	9th	Marathon	2:26:40	
2023 Dublin Marathon	1st	Marathon	2:26:22	Personal best at the time
2024 Dublin Marathon	2nd	Marathon	2:24:45	Personal best

== Personal bests ==
As of May 2025, Negash's personal best is:

- Marathon – 2:24:45 (Dublin, 27 October 2024)
