= Bellingham High School =

Bellingham High School may refer to:

- Bellingham High School (Washington) Bellingham, Washington, U.S.
- Bellingham High School (Massachusetts) Bellingham, Massachusetts, U.S.
