= Andriy Naumov =

Ukrainian long-distance runner

Andriy Naumov or Andrii Naumov (born 21 December 1973) is a Ukrainian athlete who specialises in long distance running, principally the marathon.

He competed in the marathon final at the 2001 World Championships in Athletics and finished in 50th place. He was twice the winner of the Munich Marathon, taking the title in a time of 2:13:57 (in 2001) and in 2:18:23 (in 2010).

He won the Ljubljana Marathon two years running in 2002 and 2003, and also won the Moscow International Peace Marathon twice in 2005 and 2006. Naumov finished second in the 2006 Istanbul Marathon, just seconds behind winner Mindaugas Pukštas. In 2008 he won the Dublin Marathon in a personal best time of 2:11:06. He returned to defend his title the following year but only managed to finish in eighth position.

In 2011, he ran at the Athens Classic Marathon and came fourth overall.

== Achievements ==
- All results regarding marathon, unless stated otherwise

Year	Competition	Venue	Position	Notes
Representing Ukraine
2001	Prague Marathon	Prague, Czech Republic	6th	2:12:31
2001	World Championships	Edmonton, Canada	50th	2:31:42
2002	Ljubljana Marathon	Ljubljana, Slovenia	1st	2:14:30
2003	Linz Marathon	Linz, Austria	2nd	2:13:37
2003	Ljubljana Marathon	Ljubljana, Slovenia	1st	2:13:58
2003	Pittsburgh Marathon	Pittsburgh, United States	3rd	2:14:47
2004	Linz Marathon	Linz, Austria	2nd	2:16:28
2004	Ljubljana Marathon	Ljubljana, Slovenia	2nd	2:15:22
2005	Mainz Marathon	Mainz, Germany	2nd	2:20:00
2005	Houston Marathon	Houston, United States	2nd	2:15:16
2005	Moscow Marathon	Moscow, Russia	1st	2:18:19
2006	Mainz Marathon	Mainz, Germany	1st	2:13:56
2006	Moscow Marathon	Moscow, Russia	1st	2:16:49
2006	Istanbul Marathon	Istanbul, Turkey	2nd	2:12:59
2007	Mainz Marathon	Mainz, Germany	1st	2:14:04
2008	Mainz Marathon	Mainz, Germany	1st	2:11:10
2008	Dublin Marathon	Dublin, Ireland	1st	2:11:06
2009	Dublin Marathon	Dublin, Ireland	8th	2:13:35
2010	Prague Marathon	Prague, Czech Republic	14th	2:13:49
