= Edinburgh Marathon =

Annual marathon event in Scotland

- Date: May
- Location: Edinburgh and East Lothian, Scotland
- Event type: Road
- Distance: Marathon, Half marathon, 10K, 5K
- Established: 2003
- Course records: Men: Joel Kiptoo (KEN) 2:13:33; Women: Zinaida Semenova (RUS) 2:33:36
- Website: Edinburgh Marathon

The Edinburgh Marathon is an annual marathon event, governed by Scottish Athletics and run in Scotland over the traditional distance of 42.195 kilometres (26.219 mi). The first marathon event in Edinburgh was in 1982. Further marathons were held in Edinburgh in 1986 and 1999. Since 2003 the Edinburgh Marathon Festival has been held each year, usually in May. The current route begins in the city centre, moves out of Edinburgh into East Lothian, finishing at Musselburgh, East Lothian.

== History ==
On 5 September 1982, the Edinburgh Festival Marathon was the first mass marathon event to be held in the city. Starting in Holyrood Park and running through the Grassmarket and down Lothian Road, along Princes Street and down into Leith, along to Cramond and along the coast back through Silverknowes to Leith, up Easter Road and finishing in Meadowbank Stadium. The following year the race was called the Scotway Marathon and got off to an eventful start when a foolish fun-runner brought down the previous year's winner, breaking bones in the latter's hand. An Edinburgh Waverley Market Marathon was held on Sept 2nd 1984 with winner Lindsay Robertson in a then PB of 2:15:55. The Edinburgh Waverley Market Marathon again took place on Sept 1st 1985. Winner was M Carroll in 2:18:41. In 1986 it was called the Commonwealth Games People's Marathon and held in June, a month ahead of the Commonwealth Games. In 1999 the PUMA Edinburgh Marathon was held, leaving from Dunfermline and finishing in Meadowbank Stadium, Edinburgh.

The Edinburgh Marathon Festival was founded by Geoff Sims and the first year's event on 15 June 2003, attracted just 3,000 participants. The course started at Meadowbank Stadium, taking in Princes Street, Holyrood Palace and the Royal Yacht Britannia. Frank McGowan from Glasgow won the men's race in 2.35 with the slowest man Lloyd Stott taking more than six days to complete the race wearing a deep sea diving suit weighing more than 100 pounds.

In 2007 organisers designed a new route, that headed into East Lothian through, Musselburgh, Prestonpans, Cockenzie, Port Seton to Gosford House, then back up to the finishing line at the playing fields at Pinkie St Peter's Primary School, Musselburgh. With an elevation drop of 40 metres, the average finish time was almost 12 minutes faster than previous year's Edinburgh earned its title of UK's fastest marathon. It was the first year that the event made a profit. Road closures for the new route affected around 130 streets.

In 2010, the half marathon was introduced for the first time with entry levels jumping to more than 24,000.

2011 was the first time the Edinburgh Marathon Festival was hosted over two days. As well as the full marathon, the festival also included a 5K, 10K, two junior races and a half marathon and a team relay race, affectionately named the "Hairy Haggis."

The 2020 edition of the race was postponed to 30 May 2021 (Note: It was first postponed on 2020.03.16 to 2020.09.06.) due to the coronavirus pandemic, then again to 29 May 2022.

== Men's winners ==
Year	Athlete	Nationality	Time (h:m:s)	Notes
1982	Dave Ellis	United Kingdom	2:21:09	
1983	Lindsay Robertson	United Kingdom	2:21:36	
2003	Graham Reilly	United Kingdom	2:16:21	
2004	Zachary Kihara	Kenya	2:21:45	
2005	Zachary Kihara	Kenya	2:15:26	
2006	Joseph Mbithi	Kenya	2:15:46P	
2007	Ian Grime	United Kingdom	2:31:57	
2008	Paul MacNamara	Ireland	2:25:05	
2009	Martin Williams	United Kingdom	2:18:24	
2010	Steve Littler	United Kingdom	2:26:31	
2011	Phil Nicholls	United Kingdom	2:19:21	
2012	John Mutai	Kenya	2:19:52	
2013	Tola Lema	Ethiopia	2:15:32	
2014	David Toniok	Kenya	2:15:33	
2015	Peter Wanjiru	Kenya	2:19:36	
2016	Boaz Kiprono	Kenya	2:19:55	
2017	Julius Korir	Kenya	2:17:13	
2018	Joel Kiptoo	Kenya	2:13:33	Course record
2019	Dan Tanui	Kenya	2:30:13	
2020	postponed to 2021 due to coronavirus pandemic			
2021	postponed to 2022 due to coronavirus pandemic			
2022	Matt Gillette	United States	2:17:57	
2023	Alex Gladley	United Kingdom	2:21:34	
2024	Moray Pryde	United Kingdom	2:23:12	
2025	Marshall Smith	United Kingdom	2:22:16	
2026	Conor Sarsfield	United Kingdom	2:18:03	

=== Half Marathon ===
Year	Athlete	Nationality	Time (h:m:s)	Notes
2010	Dave Webb	United Kingdom	1:04:45	
2011	Andrew Douglas	United Kingdom	1:06:49	
2012	Michael Deason	United States	1:08:20	
2013	William Ryan Beattie	United Kingdom	1:09:30	
2014	Ross Houston	United Kingdom	1:07:16	
2015	Thomas Porter	United States	1:08:58	
2016	Darrell Hastie	United Kingdom	1:10:38	
2017	Pasquale-Roberto Rutigliano	Italy	1:09:39	
2018	Severino Gómez	Spain	1:10:37	
2019	Karl Darcy	United Kingdom	1:07:40	
2020	postponed to 2021 due to coronavirus pandemic			
2021	postponed to 2022 due to coronavirus pandemic			
2022	Kieran Walker	United Kingdom	1:05:19	
2023	Kieran Walker	United Kingdom	1:05:24	
2024	Sean Chalmers	United Kingdom	1:05:27	
2025	Sean Chalmers	United Kingdom	1:04:59	
2026	David Meehan	Ireland	1:08:01	

== Women's winners ==
Year	Athlete	Nationality	Time (h:m:s)	Notes
1982	Leslie Watson	United Kingdom	2:49:34	
1983	Patricia Marshall	United Kingdom		
2003	Michaela McCallum	United Kingdom	2:48:06	
2004	Walentyna Poltawska	Ukraine	2:47:24	
2005	Zinaida Semenova	Russia	2:33:36	Course record
2006	Angela Howe	United Kingdom	2:51:41	
2007	Fiona Matheson	United Kingdom	2:54:43	
2008	Pauline Powell	United Kingdom	2:47:56	
2009	Holly Rush	United Kingdom	2:41:38	
2010	Sarah Gee	United Kingdom	2:38:16	
2011	Sarah Harris	United Kingdom	2:42:59	
2012	Nataliya Lehonkova	Ukraine	2:39:48	
2013	Risper Kimaiyo	Kenya	2:35:58	
2014	Kateryna Stetsenko	Ukraine	2:36:07	
2015	Joan Kigen	Kenya	2:39:42	
2016	Eddah Jepkosgei	Kenya	2:39:53	
2017	Eddah Jepkosgei	Kenya	2:37:46	
2018	Caroline Jepchirchir	Kenya	2:47:35	
2019	Melanie Wilkins	United Kingdom	2:42:56	
2020	postponed to 2021 due to coronavirus pandemic			
2021	postponed to 2022 due to coronavirus pandemic			
2022	Virginie Barrand	France	2:45:03	
2023	Jemima Farley	United Kingdom	2:39:39	
2024	Johanna Oregan	United Kingdom	2:48:15	
2025	Melissah Gibson	United Kingdom	2:38:42	
2026	Melissah Gibson	United Kingdom	2:43:52	

=== Half Marathon ===
Year	Athlete	Nationality	Time (h:m:s)	Notes
2010	Dianne Lauder	United Kingdom	1:16:59	
2011	Becky Penty	United Kingdom	1:15:31	
2012	Gabriela Traña	Costa Rica	1:15:01	
2013	Dianne Lauder	United Kingdom	1:24:50	
2014	Gladys Ganiel	Ireland	1:17:26	
2015	Gemma Rankin	United Kingdom	1:17:21	
2016	Tracy Millmore	United Kingdom	1:18:41	
2017	Avril Mason	United Kingdom	1:19:49	
2018	Breege Connolly	Ireland	1:16:07	
2019	Molly Browne	United Kingdom	1:18:27	
2020	postponed to 2021 due to coronavirus pandemic			
2021	postponed to 2022 due to coronavirus pandemic			
2022	Rebecca Burns	United Kingdom	1:17:28	
2023	Emma Houchell	United Kingdom	1:14:48	
2024	Jenny Selman	United Kingdom	1:19:51	
2025	Stella Cross	United Kingdom	1:19:02	
2026	Rebecca Ezra-Ham	United Kingdom	1:18:16	

== Finisher statistics ==
Total of runners finishing the original marathon distance

Year	Men	Women	Total
2003	2028	754	2782
2004	2114	738	2853
2005	3227	1192	4419
2006	2926	1170	4096
2007	2538	1031	3587
2008	4520	2092	6612
2009	5570	2684	8254
2010	6647	2812	9459
2011	6797	2940	9737
2012	5425	2638	8063
2013	5414	2728	8142
2014	5806	2809	8615
2015	4796	2389	7185
2016	4274	2322	6596

== Criticism ==
For the 2014 race, the organisers sent competitors details of their individual times but initially did not publish the full results, only giving times for the top three in each category. Within a few days, EMF events issued an apology via their website and published the full results.
