= Debbie Mueller =

American long-distance runner

Debbie Mueller (born 14 June 1959) is an American middle and long-distance runner who won many major road races in the 1980s and 1990s, including the Dublin Marathon.

== High school career ==
Mueller grew up in Bellingham, Massachusetts, at a time when girls sports were just beginning. Girls were only added to the Massachusetts High School Cross Country championships races in 1971. Mueller was the runner-up in the second and third annual girl's championship meets. In the fourth year of the state championship race (1974), Mueller was a 15-year-old at Bellingham High School. She had gained a reputation as one of the best runners in the New England region.

She won as the girl's individual champion that year. In the boys' race that year, Alberto Salazar took second to Dan Dillon. The same year, Mueller finished third for women in Massachusetts' famed 7-mile Falmouth Road Race.

In 1975, she set the girl's state high school record in the indoor track mile. She went on to win the girl's Class C State Track Championship in the mile. Her state recognition continued in 1976 with another state cross country individual woman's championship win (this time for the newly created Division 2).

== College career ==
She continued honing her potential when she attended college at Bridgewater State University, the largest public college in the state. There, she competed for the Bears on the cross country and track and field teams. At a time when female teams were just starting out, Mueller earned five NCAA All-American awards (three in track, two in cross country), and set school records for four distances in outdoor track: the 1,500 meters, 3,000 meters, 5,000 meters and 10,000 meters.

Mueller's track times earned her a place at the 1981 Saucony National Championship Woman's 10K run in Cambridge, Massachusetts. (This was before the NCAA set up regular national competitions for woman's track and field). She finished third in 36:27. She ran the Freihofer's Run for Women 10K in 1981 as well, finishing 5th in 37:55.

== Professional career ==
Mueller won multiple road races throughout the East Coast and gained professional sponsorships. She was a part of the Puma USA team and the Reebok racing team at a time before women had even been included in an Olympic marathon race.

She had a breakout year in 1982.

She ran The Athletic Congress 25K national championship and placed fifth in 1:37:10. In mid-October, she finished 18th at the Bonne Bell 10K Championships. In late October, she traveled to Dublin, Ireland to race against top women from the United Kingdom at the Dublin Marathon. The race organizers prided themselves on hosting a marathon that ran through grittier neighborhoods, over tough hills, and along the Dublin Bay—with hollering spectators at nearly every section of the course.

On what locals dubbed "Marathon Monday," in 1982, more than 11,000 people lined up at the starting line at Merrion Square.

At the front of the race, Jerry Kiernan pushed the leaders and broke away for a win in 2:13:45. Mueller lead all the women, and she won in 2:40:57, setting a woman's course record for the three-year-old marathon and becoming the only American runner (of either gender) to ever win the marathon. Her record stood until Moira O’Neill’s win in 1988.

In 1983, Mueller was the fifth-place woman at the Houston Marathon in 2:36:55. She won $1,500 at the Texas race. Her time put her in the top 100-fastest marathon times ever run by women.

Back in New England that year, she won several local races against other competitive women racers. The same year, she finished sixth in the 10th running of the Iowa Bix 7 Road Race, which was won by Joan Benoit.

By 1984, Mueller's race schedule was set to be a challenging one. She traveled to Albany, New York again for the Freihofer's Run for Women, where she ran her personal record for a 10K: 34:26, putting her at 18th in a stacked field. She raced several East Coast races afterward, winning most of them.

In the first woman's Olympic Trials Marathon, Mueller was competing against the best in the nation for a shot at running the first ever woman's Olympic marathon, which was scheduled for August in Los Angeles. The trials took place on the roads of Olympia, Washington in May, where 238 women would race some of the fastest times the nation had seen.

Joan Benoit, despite a recent knee surgery, would lead the women, followed by Julie Brown and Julie Isphording. Mueller finished in the top 20—she was 17th in 2:36:14, one second behind Patti Catalano.

She decided to travel to the Midwest in September 1984 for a marathon that was emerging as a fast, competitive race through the Minneapolis-St. Paul area. The Twin Cities Marathon had a prize purse for winners, lots of spectators, and good scenery throughout the lakeside and Mississippi River gorge roads. It was also where Mueller's grandmother lived—so she had a place to stay before the race. The competition was steep: Kersti Jakobsen and Mele Holm-Hansen from Denmark, local favorites Janis Klecker and Beverly Docherty, Canadian Susan Kainulainen, and Oregonian Debbie Eide.

The start of the race was dark and cool. Mueller ran with several others until they dropped off the pace. Then it was just two Debbies: Mueller and Eide. At the 15-mile mark, Mueller made her move and ran as the solo woman in front. She crested Summit Avenue and won first place in a personal best time of 2:34:50 on a day that saw Fred Torneden run the fastest marathon of any American in 1984.

Both Torneden and Mueller took home $20,000 each. “I like this,” Mueller quipped, “equal pay for equal work.”

Another major win for Mueller came in February 1985 on Japanese roads for the Ohme Road Race weekend. The weekend involves a 30K and 10K race that were first run in 1967, a time before a “marathon” necessarily meant 26.2 miles. The race features international competition and fast times. Mueller took the title that year in 1:49:07.

Mueller was struggling with anemia though, and felt she wasn't as fit as she had been before. By October, she had regained her comfortable weight of 90 pounds. So she returned to the Twin Cities Marathon, where she was a favorite against Janice Ettle, Gabriela Andersen-Schiess and others. She finished in the money at seventh place in 2:38:36 while Ettle took the win in 2:35:46.

One month later, Mueller attempted the Tokyo Marathon, but wasn't able to finish.

In her later career, Mueller continued to compete at larger New England races, setting course records (like at the Yankee Homecoming 10-mile) and winning open and masters categories.

== Personal life ==
Mueller's father Ken was an avid runner, and clocked a 2:22:00 at the Boston Marathon in 1975. Both of the Muellers ran races together for the Boston Athletic Association and, together, they held a record for the world's fastest father-daughter combined marathon times. While she followed in his running footsteps, she also had another job: she worked as a special-education teacher while training and running. She later became a nurse.

In 1989, Bridgewater State University inducted her to their athletic Hall of Fame. As of 2021, she still held the university record for the 3,000 meters for her 1982 mark of 10:17. Mueller and her husband reside in Massachusetts.

== Achievements ==
Year	Competition	Venue	Position	Event	Notes
1974	Falmouth Road Race	Falmouth, Massachusetts	3rd	7-mile	48:31
1981	Saucony National Championships	Cambridge, Massachusetts	1st	10K	36:27
1982	Dublin Marathon	Dublin, Ireland	1st	Marathon	2:40:57
1983	Houston Marathon	Houston, Texas	5th	Marathon	2:40:57
1984	Twin Cities Marathon	Minneapolis-St. Paul	1st	Marathon	2:34:50
1985	Ohme Road Race Archived 2021-01-16 at the Wayback Machine	Ome, Japan	1st	30K	1:49:07

- Citations: American Association of Road Racing Statisticians
