= Ljubljana Marathon =

Annual race in Slovenia held since 1996

- Date: Third Sunday in October
- Location: Ljubljana, Slovenia
- Event type: Road
- Distance: Marathon
- Primary sponsor: NLB d.d.
- Established: 1996 (30 years ago)
- Course records: Men's: 2:04:55 (2026) (Ethiopia) Enock Onchari; Women's: 2:19:17 (2026) (Ethiopia) Haftamnesh Tesfay
- Website: Ljubljana Marathon
- Participants: 2,246 finishers (2024); 1,611 (2023); 1,208 (2022)

The Ljubljana Marathon (Slovene: Ljubljanski maraton) is the largest running event in Slovenia, organized annually since 1996 by the City of Ljubljana and implemented by the Timing Ljubljana Association. It takes place every year on the third weekend in October. The main event is the Heineken 0.0 Marathon (42 km), and there are also the Generali ZAME Half Marathon (21 km), the Garmin Run 10 km, all on Sunday. The Saturday program is intended for younger people: preschoolers, School Runs (for students and high school students), and a charity run. From 2024, the general sponsor is NLB d.d.

== History ==
The marathon was first held on 27 October 1996. A total of 673 runners participated in the inaugural event, with 153 runners taking part in the marathon.

In 2020, the 25th Ljubljana Marathon was postponed to 2021 due to the coronavirus pandemic, with all registrants given the option of transferring their entry to 2021 or obtaining a full refund. However, the marathon organizers were also planning to hold another marathon that was compliant with coronavirus restrictions, called the "Maraton po Ljubljani", (Note: This race has been referred to in English as the "Marathon on the Streets of Ljubljana".) on the originally scheduled date of 25 October 2020, with only up to 450 (Note: The National Institute of Public Health (NIJZ) does not allow organized events to exceed 500 participants, and there would be about 50 organizers present during the race.) runners allowed to take part. (Note: A separate registration process for the Maraton po Ljubljani was scheduled to open on 1 October at 10:25. In addition, this race would not be considered a Ljubljana Marathon so that the 25th Ljubljana Marathon would not be celebrated in 2020.) Nine days before the scheduled date, the Maraton po Ljubljani was cancelled due to the second wave of the pandemic, with all registrants automatically receiving refunds.

== Course ==
External images
- Course map of full marathon in 2015
- Course map of full marathon in 2019

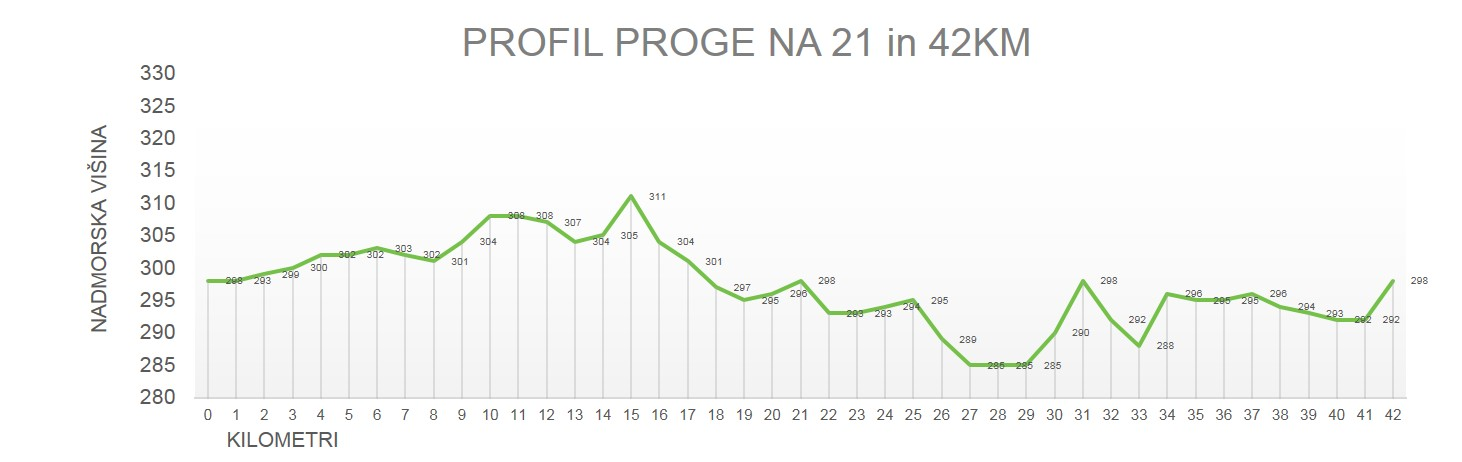
Profile of full marathon in 2015

The start is on Slovenska cesta near Figovec (Trg Ajdovščina), all routes are circular (in one circle), flat, and the finish is at Kongresni trg.

== Other races ==
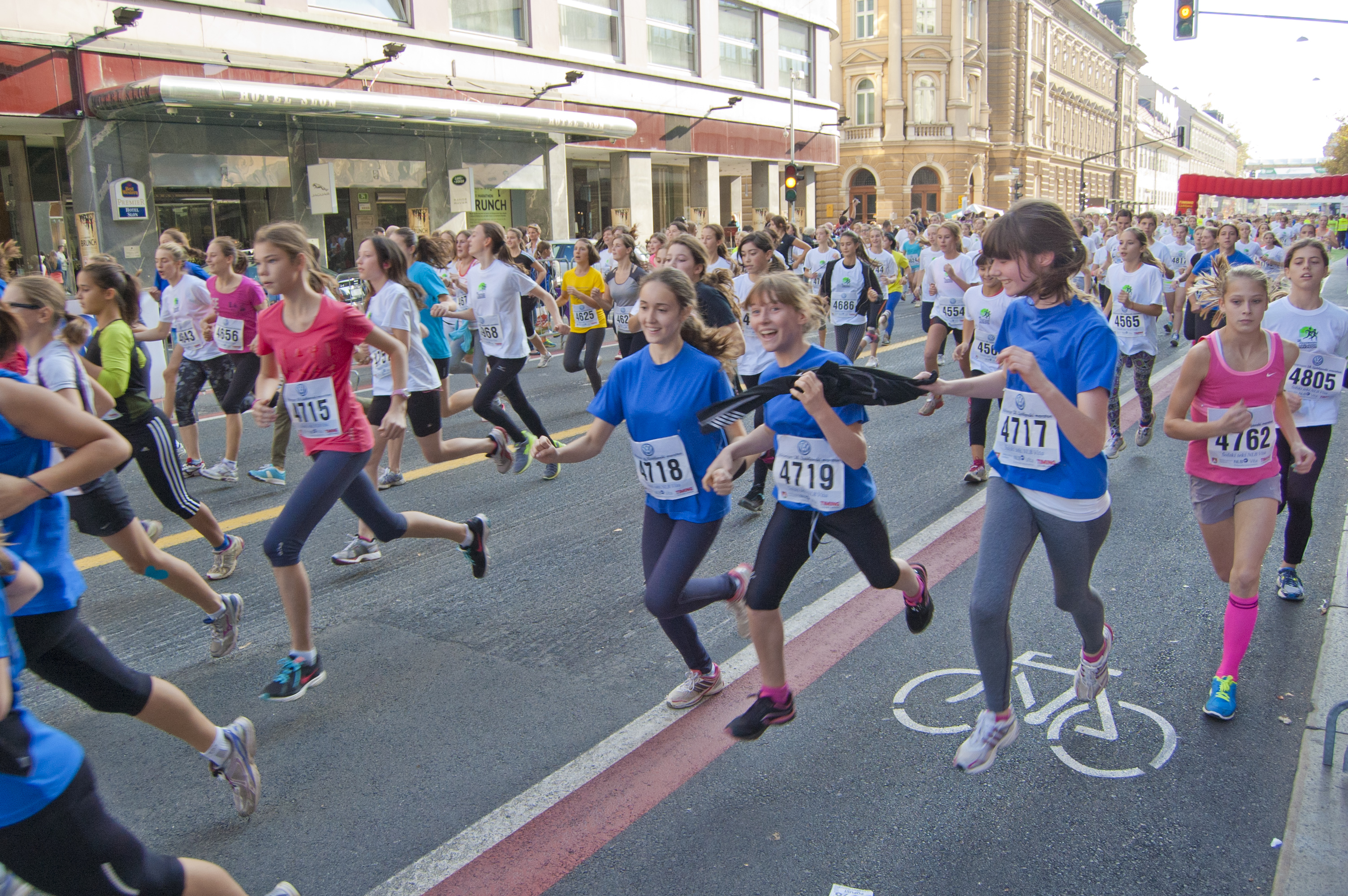
Teenagers running on Slovenia Street in front of Hotel Slon, 2013

In addition to the marathon, a half marathon (21.098 km (13.110 mi)), a 10K run, a fun run (3.150 km (1.957 mi)), and a free run for kids (200 m (660 ft)) are organised. A number of races of different lengths for schoolchildren of different ages are also held.

== Winners ==
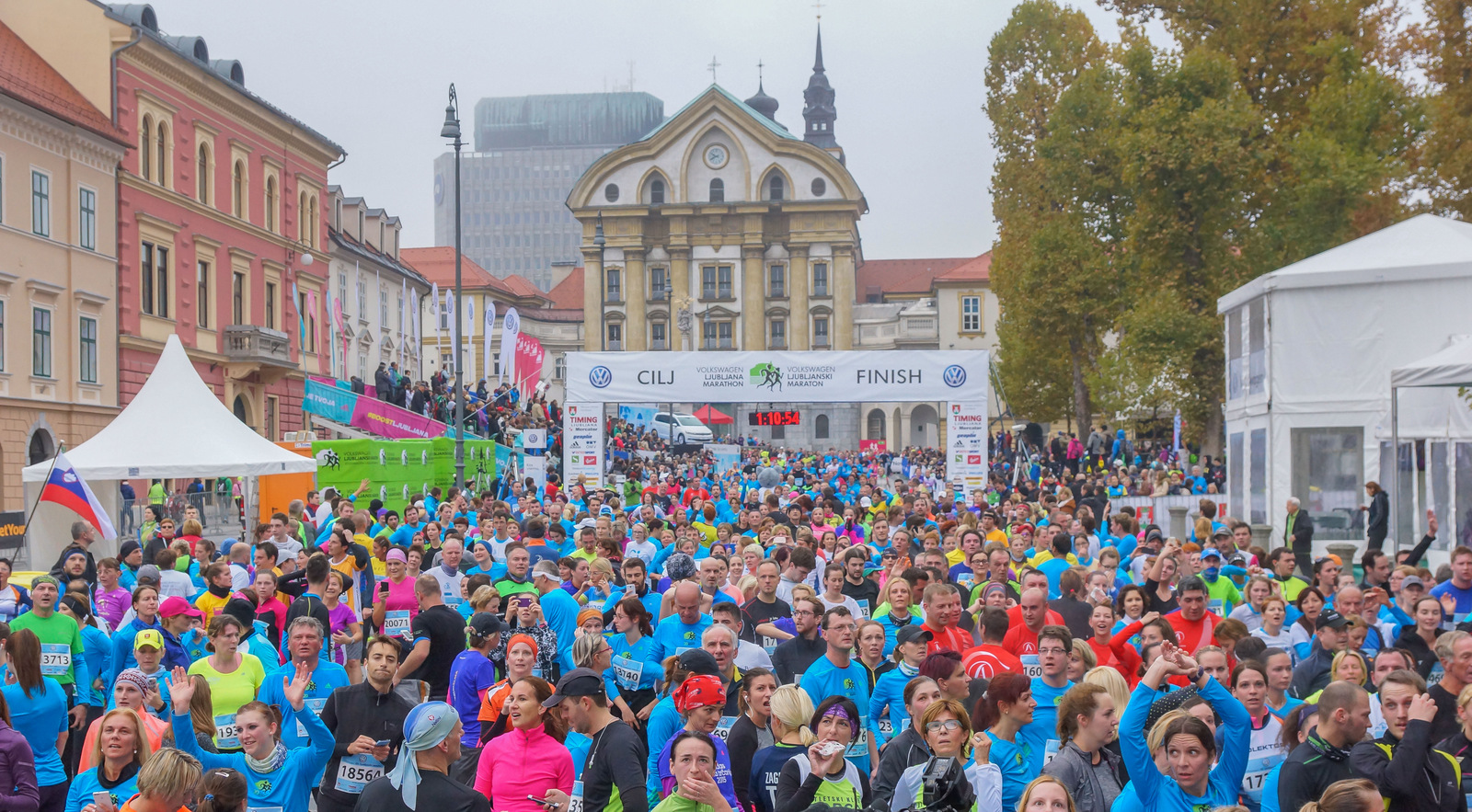
Finish line in 2015

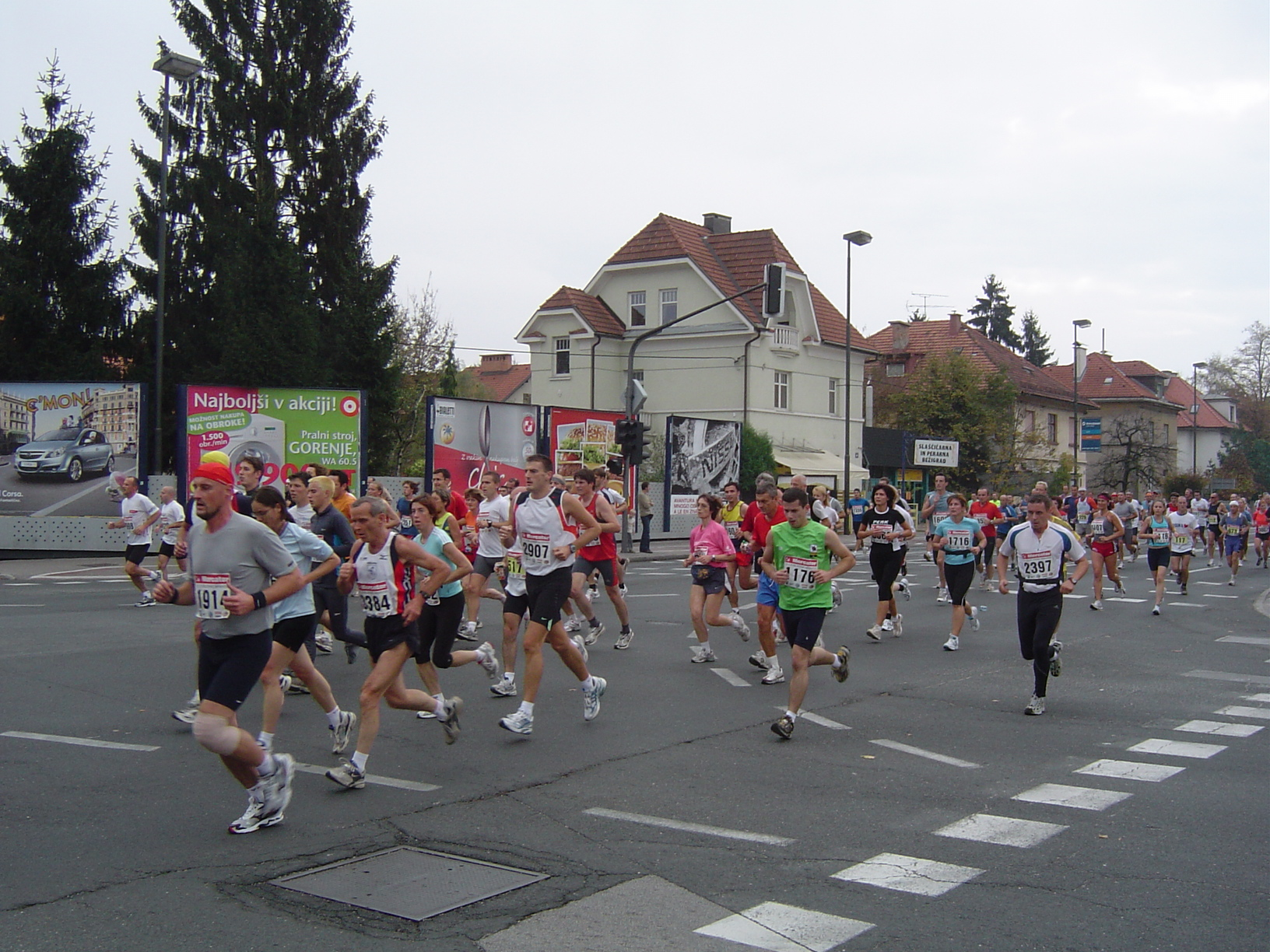
The 11th Ljubljana Marathon

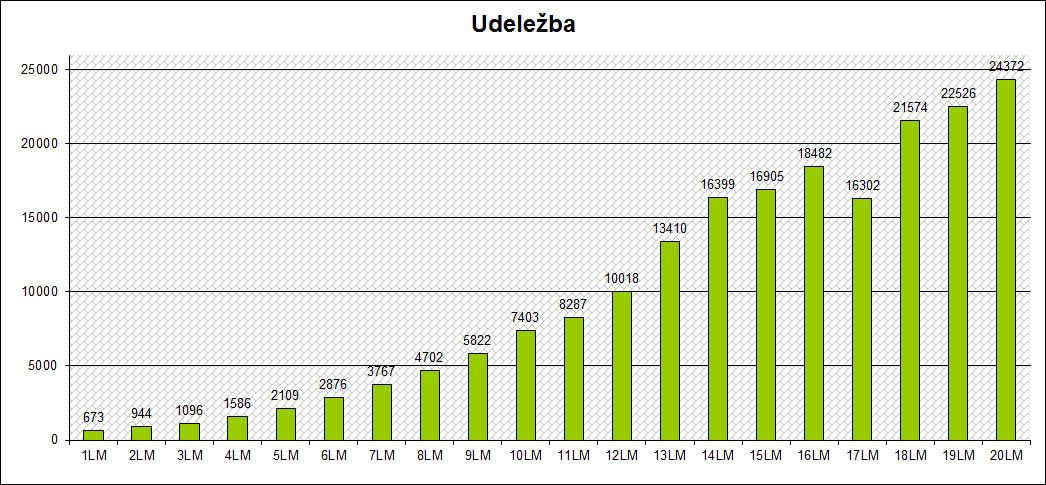
Total participants in all races

Key: Course record

Year	Men's winner	Time	Women's winner	Time	Rf.
2026	Enock Onchari (KEN)	2:04:55	Haftamnesh Tesfay (ETH)	2:19:17	
2025	Haftamu Gebresilase (ETH)	2:06:52	Tigist Gezahagn (ETH)	2:22:47	
2024	Getaneh Molla (ETH)	2:06:29	Joyce Chepkemoi Tele (KEN)	2:20:17	
2023	Edmond Kipngetich (KEN)	2:06:47	Gerado Senbeta Zinash (ETH)	2:21:05	
2022	Gebretsadik Abraha (ETH)	2:06:09	Dagne Siranesh Yirga (ETH)	2:21:08	
2021	Ernest Tarus (KEN)	2:22:39	Grace Momanyi (KEN)	2:38:10	
2020	postponed due to coronavirus pandemic				
2019	Kelkile Gezahegn (ETH)	2:07:29	Bornes Chepkirui (KEN)	2:21:26	
2018	Sisay Lemma (ETH)	2:04:58	Visiline Jepkesho (KEN)	2:22:58	
2017	Marius Kimutai (BHR)	2:08:33	Shuko Genemo (ETH)	2:27:02	
2016	Laban Mutai (KEN)	2:09:16	Purity Changwony (KEN)	2:29:32|	(Note: Levy Matebo Omari would finish 1st with a course record (unofficial 2:07:40) but was misled by an official TV-car at 40 km and had to run an extra distance of around 450 m)
2015	Limenih Getachew (ETH)	2:08:19	Melkam Gizaw (ETH)	2:25:42	
2014	Ishhimael Chemtan (KEN)	2:08:25	Janet Rono (KEN)	2:29:16	
2013	Mulugeta Wami (ETH)	2:10:26	Caroline Chepkwony (KEN)	2:27:27	
2012	Berhanu Shiferaw (ETH)	2:09:40	Workenesh Tola (ETH)	2:30:45	
2011	Daniel Too (KEN)	2:08:25	Lydia Kurgat (KEN)	2:33:01	
2010	Evans Ruto (KEN)	2:10:17	Tiruwork Mekonnen (ETH)	2:37:16	
2009	William Biama (KEN)	2:10:12	Caroline Kilel (KEN)	2:25:24	
2008	Abraham Mulu (ETH)	2:14:41	Tetyana Mezentseva (UKR)	2:37:13	
2007	Oleksandr Sitkovskyy (UKR)	2:12:49	Tetyana Filonyuk (UKR)	2:34:58	
2006	Joachim Nshimirimana (BDI)	2:14:14	Inga Juodeškiene (LTU)	3:01:55	
2005	Samuel Nganga (KEN)	2:15:47	Daneja Grandovec (SLO)	2:50:42	
2004	Joachim Nshimirimana (BDI)	2:13:31	Yelena Razdrogina (RUS)	2:46:30	
2003	Andriy Naumov (UKR)	2:13:58	Galina Zhulyeva (UKR)	2:38:13	
2002	Andriy Naumov (UKR)	2:14:30	Galina Zhulyeva (UKR)	2:39:36	
2001	Roman Kejžar (SLO)	2:22:57	Nada Rotovnik-Kozjek (SLO)	3:09:47	
2000	Patrick Chumba (KEN)	2:13:35	Maria Luisa Costetti (ITA)	3:08:38	
1999	Woliye Jara (ETH)	2:20:53	Lyudmila Petrova (RUS)	2:52:25	
1998	Piotr Pobłocki (POL)	2:18:20	Helena Javornik (SLO)	2:32:33	
1997	Charles Subano (KEN)	2:19:28	Helena Javornik (SLO)	2:40:05	
1996	Roman Kejžar (SLO)	2:20:12	Helena Javornik (SLO)	2:37:58	

== Statistics ==
Note: Marathon statistics only

=== Multiple wins ===
Men's
Athlete	Wins	Years
Roman Kejžar (SLO)	2	1996, 2001
Andriy Naumov (UKR)	2	2002, 2003
Joachim Nshimirimana (BDI)	2	2004, 2006

Women's
Athlete	Wins	Years
Helena Javornik (SLO)	3	1996, 1997, 1998
Galina Zhulyeva (UKR)	2	2002, 2003

=== Winners by country ===
Country	Men's race	Women's race	Total
Kenya	11	10	21
Ethiopia	9	6	15
Ukraine	3	4	7
Slovenia	2	5	7
Russia	0	2	2
Burundi	2	0	2
Poland	1	0	1
Lithuania	0	1	1
Italy	0	1	1
