= Shiferaw =

Shiferaw (Amharic: ሸፈራው) can be a masculine given name, a middle name, or a surname. Notable people with the name include:

== Given name ==
- Shiferaw Shigute, Ethiopian politician

== Middle name ==
- Yohanes Shiferaw Yohanes (born 1973), Ethiopian boxer

== Surname ==
- Andualem Belay Shiferaw (born 1992), Ethiopian long-distance runner
- Berhanu Shiferaw (born 1993), Ethiopian long-distance runner
- Tewodros Shiferaw (born 1980), Ethiopian steeplechase runner
