= Ricky Santos =

American gridiron football player and coach (born 1984)

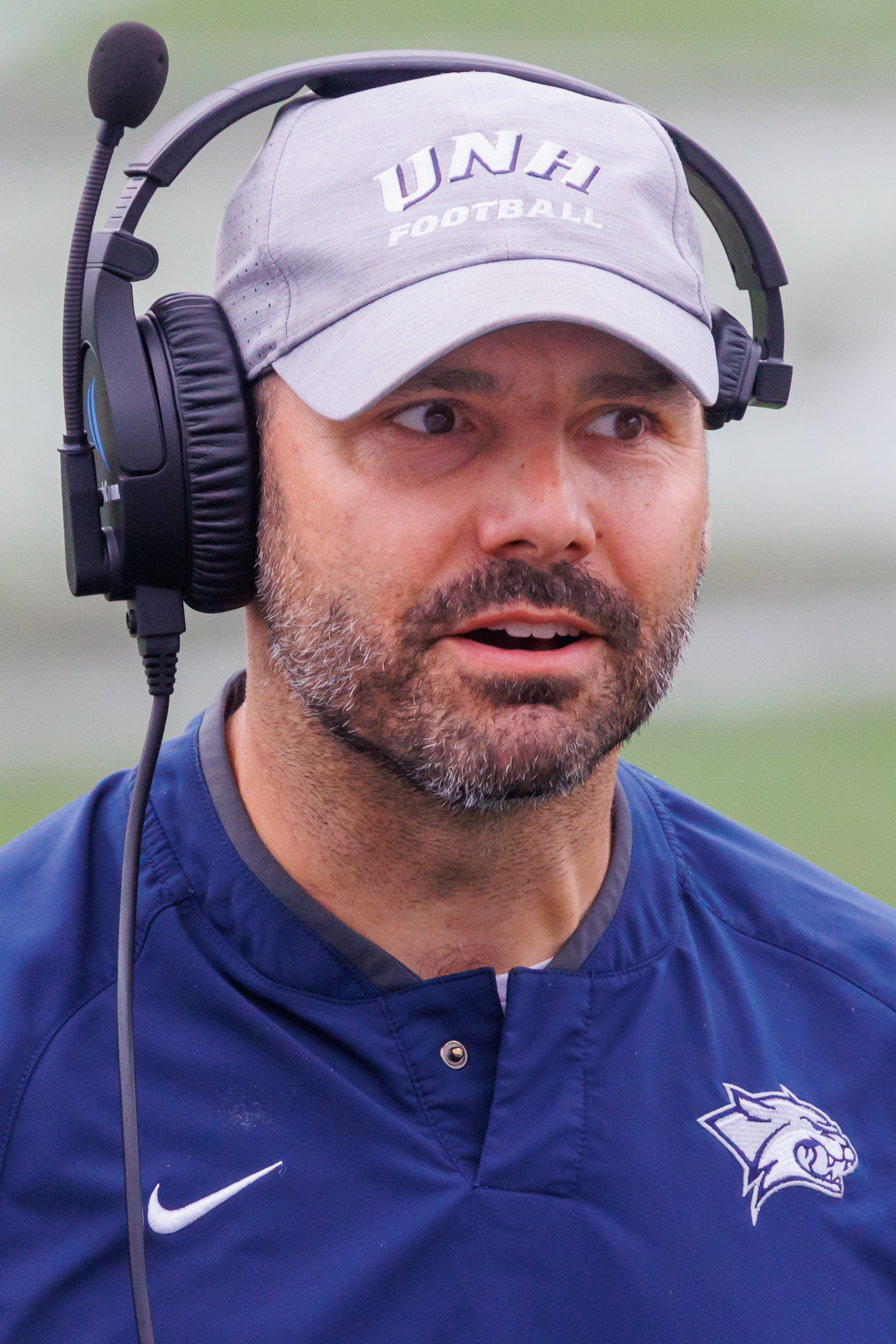
- Santos in 2024

Penn Quakers
- Title: Head coach

Personal information
- Born: April 26, 1984 (age 42); Norwood, Massachusetts, U.S.
- Listed height: 6 ft 2 in (1.88 m)
- Listed weight: 205 lb (93 kg)

Career information
- Position: Quarterback
- High school: Bellingham (Bellingham, Massachusetts)
- College: New Hampshire (2003–2007)
- NFL draft: 2008: undrafted

Career history

Playing
- Kansas City Chiefs (2008)*; Montreal Alouettes (2008–2009); Winnipeg Blue Bombers (2009); Montreal Alouettes (2010–2011); Toronto Argonauts (2012)*
- * Offseason or practice squad member only

Coaching
- Bellingham HS (MA) (2012) Assistant coach; New Hampshire (2013–2015) Wide receivers coach; Columbia (2016–2018) Quarterbacks coach; New Hampshire (2019) Interim head coach; New Hampshire (2020–2021) Associate head coach & quarterbacks coach; New Hampshire (2022–2025) Head coach; Penn (2026–present) Head coach

Awards and highlights
- Grey Cup champion (2010); 3× All-American (2005–2007); 3× All-Atlantic 10 (2004–2006); 2× Atlantic 10 Offensive Player of the Year (2005, 2006); All-CAA (2007); CAA Co-Offensive Player of the Year (2007); Walter Payton Award (2006); ECAC Rookie of the Year (2004); Atlantic 10 Co-Rookie of the Year (2004); CAA Football Coach of the Year (2022)

Richard Santos (born April 26, 1984) is an American former gridiron football quarterback who is currently the head coach for the Penn Quakers football team. He played college football at New Hampshire, and was signed by the Kansas City Chiefs as an undrafted free agent in 2008.

== Early life ==
Santos attended Bellingham High School in Bellingham, Massachusetts, and was a letterman in football, basketball, baseball, and track and field. In football, he was a two-time Tri-Valley League MVP, was twice named the Division V Player of the Year, a two-time MetroWest Player of the Year, and, as a senior, won all-State honors. In November 2002, during the first annual Thanksgiving Day game against Norton, he threw for seven touchdown passes all to his cousin Stephen Wood, which is still one of the best high school performances in Bellingham history. He broke the state touchdown record and led his teams to two Massachusetts High School Super Bowl titles (2000 and 2001). He graduated from Bellingham High in 2003.

== College career ==
Santos attended the University of New Hampshire and was a four-year starter at quarterback. He originally came to the university as a walk-on, and said that if it did not work out for him, he was going to try for basketball. Santos studied Kinesiology/Sports Management while at the university. During his college career, the Wildcats went a combined 37–14, winning one Atlantic 10 Football Conference Championship, two Northern Division Championships, and made the NCAA I-AA/FCS Playoffs all four seasons. A three-time All-America selection, Santos won the Walter Payton Award in 2006, as the top offensive player in FCS (formerly Division I-AA). Santos finished his college career third on the NCAA all-time career passing yardage list with 13,212 yards, and third on the NCAA all-time list for career touchdown passes with 123. After the 2007 season, his no. 2 uniform number was retired by New Hampshire. This jersey retirement marked the fourth Wildcat in history to see their football jersey number retired. In 2016, Santos was inducted to the university's athletic hall of fame.

== Professional career ==
After going undrafted in the 2008 NFL draft, multiple teams such as the Washington Commanders (formerly the Washington Redskins) and Kansas City Chiefs expressed interest in Santos. Santos ultimately agreed to join the Kansas City Chiefs as an undrafted free agent in April. However, he was released the same month.

In May 2008, Santos was signed by the Montreal Alouettes of the Canadian Football League. He appeared in zero games for the Alouettes.

On September 21, 2009, the Winnipeg Blue Bombers acquired Santos from the Montreal Alouettes in exchange for non-import defensive ends Riall Johnson and Shawn Mayne. He was released by the Blue Bombers on May 17, 2010, after appearing in seven games during his tenure.

After an injury to Adrian McPherson, the Montreal Alouettes re-signed Santos on June 22, 2010, to serve as the third-string quarterback. Santos saw the most action in his CFL career, appearing in 29 games. He compiled 94 passing yards, and 58 rushing yards, throwing for three touchdowns during this time. On June 9, 2012, he was released by the Alouettes.

On June 16, 2012, Santos was signed by the Toronto Argonauts. He was released four days later.

== Coaching career ==
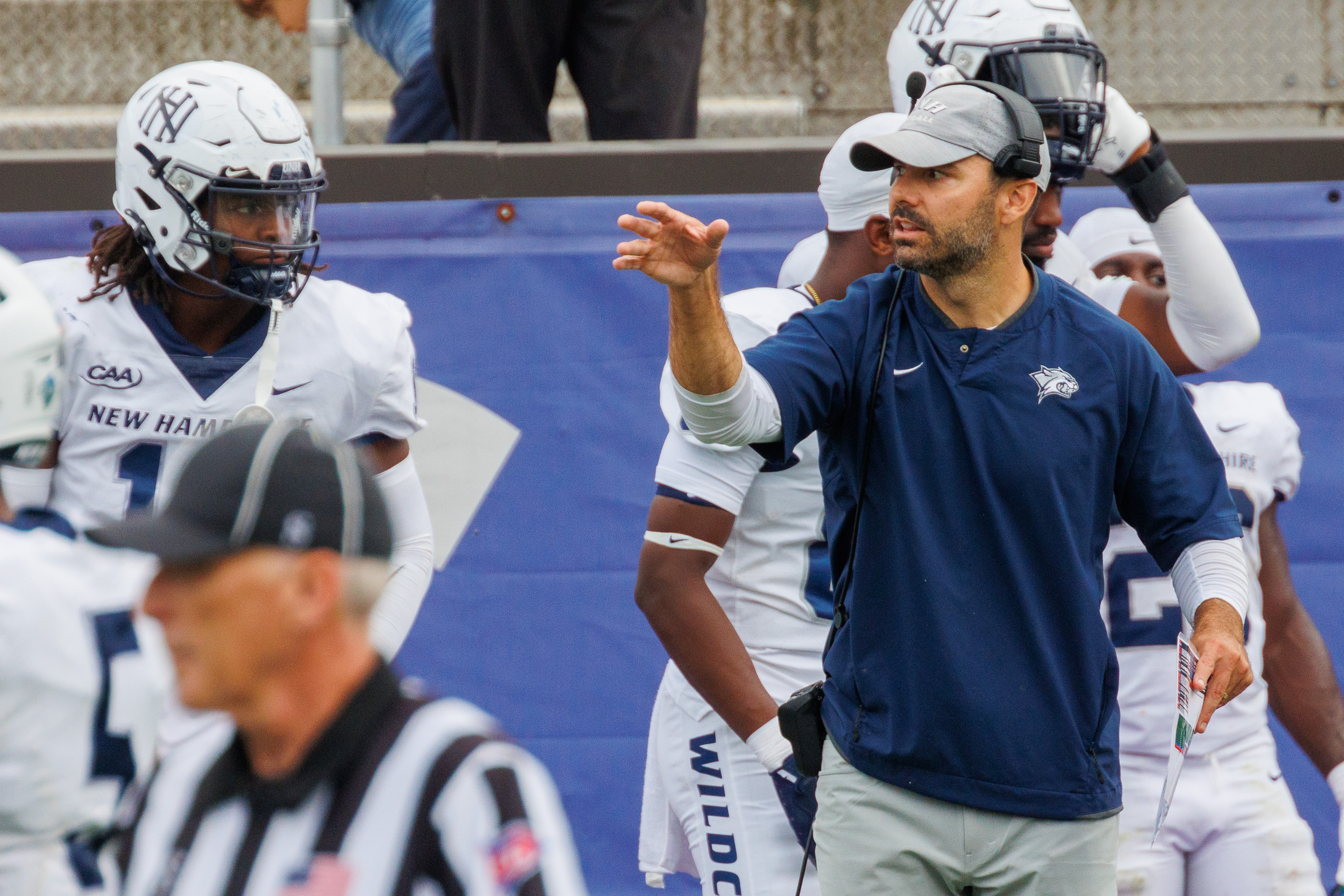
Santos gives direction to Wildcat players

After Santos' tenure as a football player came to an end, he decided to stay with the game of football and start to coach. He began in 2012 at his former high school in Bellingham, Massachusetts. He then went back to New Hampshire to coach wide receivers from 2013 to 2015. Later, Santos was the quarterbacks coach for three seasons (2016–2018) with the Columbia Lions.

Santos rejoined the New Hampshire coaching staff in March 2019, as associate head coach and quarterbacks coach. When Wildcats head coach Sean McDonnell took a leave of absence for health reasons in late August 2019, Santos was named interim head coach for the team. The 2019 Wildcats finished with a record of 6–5. McDonnell returned to the team for the 2020 season, with Santos resuming his role as associate head coach and quarterbacks coach. McDonnell retired on December 1, 2021; the following week, Santos was formally named the next head football coach for the Wildcats. Santos and the Wildcats compiled a 23–13 record over his first three years including a share of the Colonial Athletic Association (CAA) regular-season title in 2022, when he won the 2022 Coach of the Year award for the CAA. Santos led the Wildcats to three FCS playoff appearances, in 2022, 2024, and 2025. The Wildcats made it to the second round of the playoffs in 2022; they were eliminated in the first round in 2024 and 2025.

In December 2025, it was announced that Santos was departing New Hampshire to become head coach for the Penn Quakers football team.

== Personal life ==
Ricky Santos was born in Norwood, Massachusetts to parents, Debbie and Richard Santos. Santos is a cousin of racecar driver Bobby Santos III. Ricky and his wife, Ulyana Santos are parents of two children: daughter, Rya, and son, AJ.

He resides in the Seacoast Region of New Hampshire near the University of New Hampshire.

== Head coaching record ==
Year	Team	Overall	Conference	Standing	Bowl/playoffs	STATS^{#}	Coaches^{°}
New Hampshire Wildcats (Colonial Athletic Association) (2019)
2019	New Hampshire	6–5	5–3	T–3rd			
New Hampshire Wildcats (Colonial Athletic Association) (2022)
2022	New Hampshire	9–4	7–1	T–1st	L NCAA Division I Second Round	13	15
New Hampshire Wildcats (Coastal Athletic Association Football Conference) (2023–present)
2023	New Hampshire	6–5	4–4	T–6th			
2024	New Hampshire	8–5	6–2	T–3rd	L NCAA Division I First Round	23	24
2025	New Hampshire	8–5	6–2	T–3rd	L NCAA Division I First Round	23	
New Hampshire:		37–24	28–12				
Total:		37–24					
