= Bellingham High School (Massachusetts) =

Location
- 60 Blackstone Street; Bellingham, Massachusetts 02019; United States
- 42.0777°N 71.4678°W

Information
- Type: Public high school Open enrollment
- Principal: Megan Lafayette
- Staff: 60.12 (FTE)
- Grades: 8–12
- Enrollment: 749 (2023-2024)
- Student to teacher ratio: 12.46
- Colors: Black and white
- Athletics conference: Tri-Valley League
- Mascot: Blackhawk
- Website: bhs.bellinghamk12.org

Bellingham High School, or BHS is a five-year public high school located in the town of Bellingham, Massachusetts, United States. BHS is one of two high schools in the town of Bellingham.

== History ==
This building was opened in 2001 for grades 9–12, thus making the old high school become the middle school for grades 5–8. The three elementary schools in Bellingham went from the grades kindergarten to sixth, to now kindergarten to fourth. As of 2015, the high school has transitioned to grades 8–12 as the middle school is now grades 4–7 and the two remaining elementary schools South Elementary and Stall Brook Elementary are now K–3.

== Notable alumni ==
- Ricky Santos, NFL quarterback for the Kansas City Chiefs, also played for various CFL teams.
- Debbie Mueller, only American winner of Dublin Marathon, pioneer female road runner
