= Toulouse Marathon =

- Date: October
- Location: Toulouse, France
- Event type: Road
- Distance: Marathon
- Established: 2007; 19 years ago
- Course records: 2:10:54 (men); 2:28:18 (women)
- Website: toulouserunexperience.fr

The Toulouse Marathon (Marathon de Toulouse Métropole) is an annual marathon road running event which takes place in Toulouse, France each October.

The first event was held in 2007 and due to its success has been organized annually. Since 2010 it is one of five French marathons to be awarded international status from the French Athletics Federation. In 2013 it was the venue for the French national marathon championships.

== Winners ==
Edition	Date	Men's winner	Time (h:m:s)	Women's winner	Time (h:m:s)
10th	23 October 2016	Mathew Sang Kibiwot (KEN)	2:13:55	Bentu Shiferaw Wodajo (ETH)	2:43:19
9th	25 October 2015	Stanley bett Kiprotich (KEN)	2:15:59	Natalya Starkova (RUS)	2:30:18
8th	26 October 2014	Raymond Kemboi (KEN)	2:10:58	Sardana Trofimova (KGZ)	2:28:18
7th	27 October 2013	Benjamin Bitok (KEN)	2:10:54	Corinne Herbreteau-Cante (FRA)	2:37:50
6th	28 October 2012	Benjamin Bitok (KEN)	2:12:23	Nataliya Lehonkova (UKR)	2:38:22
5th	23 October 2011	Patrick Korir (KEN)	2:11:36	Alice Serser (KEN)	2:37:06
4th	24 October 2010	Benjamin Bitok (KEN)	2:12:37	Elena Kozhevnikova (RUS)	2:45:59
3rd	25 October 2009	Benjamin Bitok (KEN)	2:14:12	Kenza Dahmani (ALG)	2:40:29
2nd	26 October 2008	Dominic Ruto (KEN)	2:19:01	Johanna Chmiel (POL)	2:48:35
1st	28 October 2007	Benjamin Bitok (KEN)	2:18:27	Tatiana Mironova (RUS)	2:39:53
