= Stepan Kiselev =

Russian long-distance runner

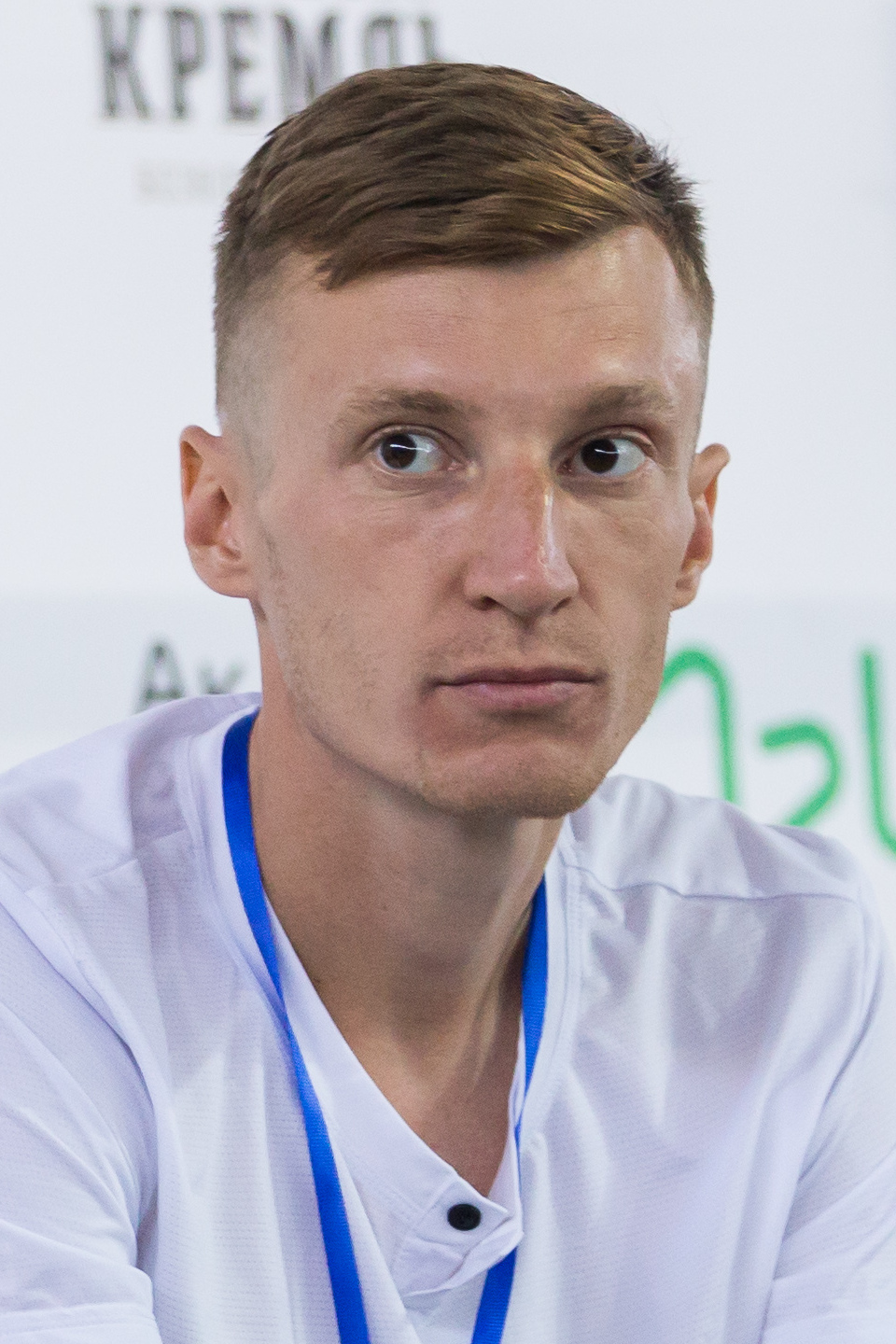

Personal information
- Born: 3 November 1986 (age 39) Kiselyovsk, Kemerovo region, USSR

Sport
- Sport: Athletics
- Event: Marathon

Achievements and titles
- Personal best(s): Marathon 2:11:28 (2014); Half Marathon 1:02:57 (2018)
Medal record
Marathons
Gold medal – first place	2019 Kazan	Marathon
Gold medal – first place	2018 Moscow	Marathon
Gold medal – first place	2017 Volgograd	Marathon

Stepan Olegovich Kiselev (born 3 November 1986) is a Russian marathon runner who won the Moscow Marathon 2018 and Каzan Marathon 2019. Тwo-time Russian Marathon Champion. In 2019 he was the winner of the Moscow Half Marathon with a time of 1:03:59.

Coached by Pavlov, Igor Leonidovich and Renato Canova.

== Marathon competition record ==
Competition	Rank	Time	Location	Date
2017 Russian Marathon Championship, Volgograd Marathon	1st	2:14:36	Volgograd	7 May 2017
2018 Russian Marathon Championship, Volgograd Marathon	2nd	2:13:17	Volgograd	30 April 2018
2018 Moscow Marathon	1st	2:15:25	Moscow	23 September 2018
2019 Russian Marathon Championship, Kazan Marathon	1st	2:12:56	Kazan	5 May 2019
2022 Moscow Marathon	2nd	2:14:48	Moscow	18 September 2022
