= Mulugeta Wami =

Ethiopian long-distance runner (born 1982)

Mulugeta Wami (born 17 July 1982) is an Ethiopian long-distance runner who specialises in the marathon. He has a personal best of 2:07:11 hours for the distance. He was the 2013 winner of the Ljubljana Marathon.

Born in Addis Ababa, he is the brother of Gete Wami, the 1999 world champion and 2000 Olympic runner-up in the 10,000 metres. His first outing over the marathon distance came at the 2006 Amsterdam Marathon, where he finished ninth with a time of 2:13:19 hours. He improved to 2:11:47 hours at the following year's Eindhoven Marathon, taking fifth place In 2008 he won the Egmond Half Marathon, but managed only a14th-place finish at the Beijing Marathon.

Mulugeta continued to improve over the marathon in 2009, first running 2:10:49 at the Los Angeles Marathon (fourth overall) then taking the Chuncheon Marathon title in a time of 2:09:50 hours. He returned to defend his Egmond Half title, but only managed a fifth-place finish. Two more bests came at the start of 2008 as he timed 59:55 minutes for fifth at the 20 van Alphen road race and 2:08:32 at the Paris Marathon, finishing sixth overall. He also failed to retain his title in Chuncheon, managing a lacklustre 2:13:07 hours. He was only marginally faster (2:12:55) at the JoongAng Seoul Marathon – his only race of 2011.

Although he was sixth at the 2012 Amsterdam Marathon, he achieved a best of 2:07:11 hours. A run of 2:10:40 was only enough for tenth at the 2013 Seoul International Marathon, but his first victory over the distance followed at the lower profile Ljubljana Marathon in October.
