= Irina Smolnikova =

Kazakhstani long-distance runner

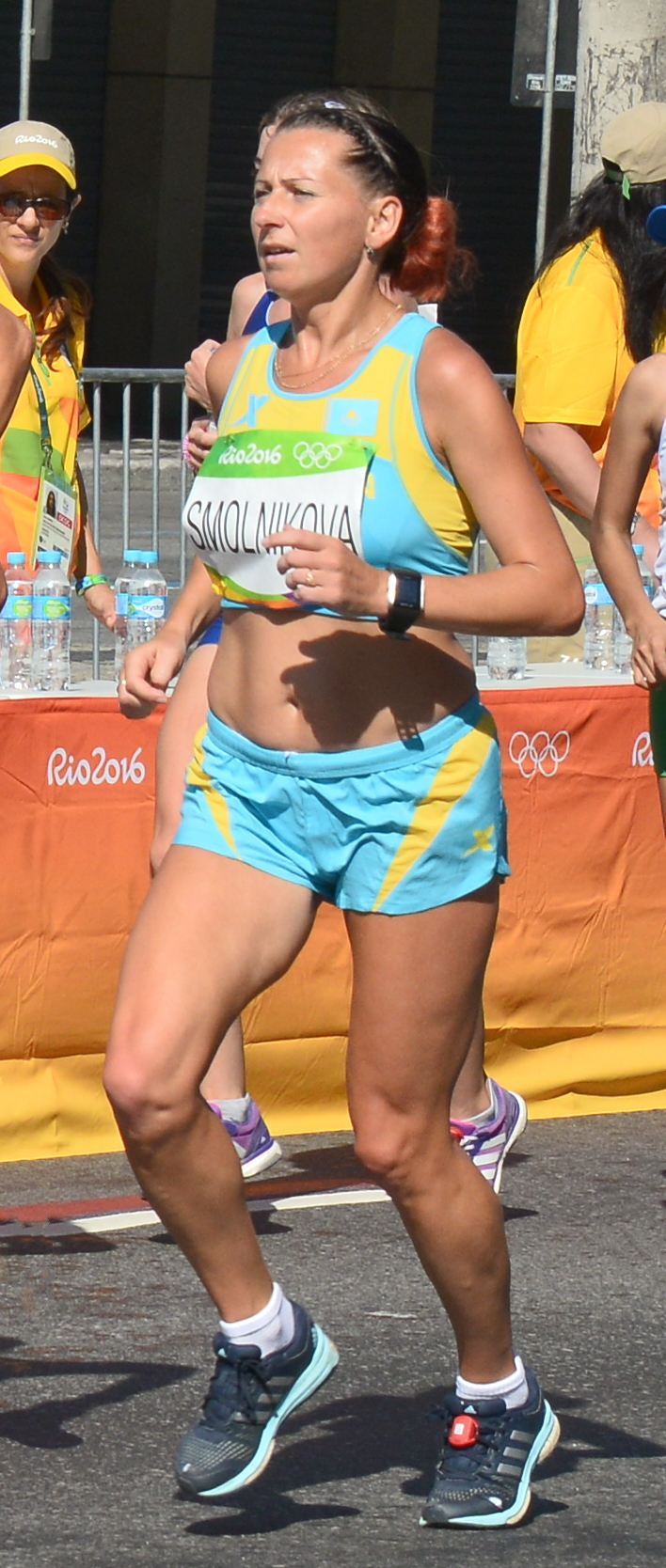
- Smolnikova at the 2016 Olympics

Personal information
- Born: 21 July 1980 (age 45) Serebryansk, Kazakh SSR, Soviet Union
- Education: East Kazakhstan State University
- Height: 163 cm (5 ft 4 in)
- Weight: 55 kg (121 lb)

Sport
- Country: Kazakhstan
- Sport: Track and field
- Event: Marathon
- Coached by: Anatoly Podkorytov (father); Tatiana Podkorytova (mother)

Achievements and titles
- Personal best: 2:40:22 (2014)
- Updated on 2 September 2015

Irina Smolnikova (born 21 July 1980) is a Kazakh long-distance runner. She competed in the marathon at the 2015 World Championships and 2016 Olympics. She is a two-time winner of the Moscow Marathon (2013–14).
