= Neil Cusack =

Irish distance runner

Neil Cusack (born 30 December 1951 in Limerick) is a retired middle- and long-distance runner from Ireland.

== Early life ==
Cusack was born in Limerick city in 1951 and attended St Munchin's College. Cusack attended East Tennessee State University. In 1972 he was the NCAA Men's Cross Country National Champion.

== Running career ==
Cusack won the Boston Marathon in 1974. He remains the only Irish athlete to have won in Boston. In 1981 Cusack won the Dublin Marathon.

== Olympics ==
Cusack represented Ireland in the 1972 Summer Olympics in Munich, Germany and in the 1976 Olympic Games in Montreal, Quebec, Canada.

== Achievements ==
Year	Competition	Venue	Position	Event	Notes
Representing Ireland
1971	Peach Bowl Marathon	Atlanta, United States	1st	Marathon	2:16:18
1972	Olympic Games	Munich, Germany	Heats (DNQ)	10,000m	28:45.8
1974	Boston Marathon	Boston, United States	1st	Marathon	2:13:39
1974	Rice Festival Marathon	Crowley, Louisiana	1st	Marathon	2:14:27
1976	Olympic Games	Montréal, Canada	55th	Marathon	2:35:47
1977	Kosice Marathon	Kosice, Slovakia	6th	Marathon	2:17:14
1981	Dublin Marathon	Dublin, Ireland	1st	Marathon	2:13:58
1985	Grandma's Marathon	Duluth, Minnesota	9th	Marathon	2:16:51
