= Julia Armstrong =

British marathon runner

Julia Armstrong née Gates
Personal information
- Nationality: British
- Born: 12 May 1959 (age 67) Freetown, Sierra Leone
- Spouse: Nigel Gates

Sport
- Sport: Athletics
- Event: long distance

Julia Helene Armstrong née Gates, (born 12 May 1959) is a female British retired marathon runner who achieved most success running as Julia Gates in the mid to late '80s.

== Biography ==
Armstrong was born in Freetown, Sierra Leone. Her family moved to Britain in 1962, and settled near Farnham, Hampshire. She began her athletic career in 1974, joining Haslemere Border AC as their first female member. Armstrong met Nigel Gates, a fellow athlete, in 1979 at an international race in Manresa, Spain, and they married in 1982, she competed under her married name thereafter.

Gates won the 1985 Dublin Marathon setting a course record with 2:41:24. Her personal best was 2:36:31, set in the 1986 London Marathon, where she came in as 3rd British finisher and 7th female overall. Also in 1986, Gates finished third behind Ann Ford in the marathon event at the 1986 WAAA Championships.

Gates represented England in the marathon event, at the 1986 Commonwealth Games in Edinburgh, Scotland. Armstrong was part of the British team that finished 3rd in the 1987 New York marathon.

For the majority of her international career Julia and her husband Nigel lived and worked together in Bath, having founded Springs Health Club in the city. They separated in 1993, and she has been married three times since then, competing as Julia McGowan (1994–1997) and Julia Cornford (1998–2001) before changing her name back to Armstrong. She continued to compete at a high level, running as an elite female in the 2008 London Marathon, and in October 2008 she took up ultrarunning, coming in as 3rd female in a 56-mile cross-country race from London to Brighton.

Throughout her early athletic career, Armstrong suffered from an eating disorder and this is documented in her book, Running to Learn. She has spoken frankly about the disorder in a number of articles and interviews with the national press.

Armstrong's worked as a personal trainer which led her in the direction of coaching and counselling, and working as a sports coach and therapist. In April 2008, Armstrong published her first book, Running to Learn, which offers a mix of autobiography and the ideas and philosophy behind her successful career as a therapist.

== Personal bests ==
- 5,000 metres - 15:51 Bath, 26 June 1985
- 10,000 metres - 33:29 Swansea Bay, 15 September 1985
- 10 miles - 55:10 Woking, 23 February 1986
- Marathon - 2:36:31 London, 20 April 1986
