= Sardana Trofimova =

Kyrgyzstani long-distance runner

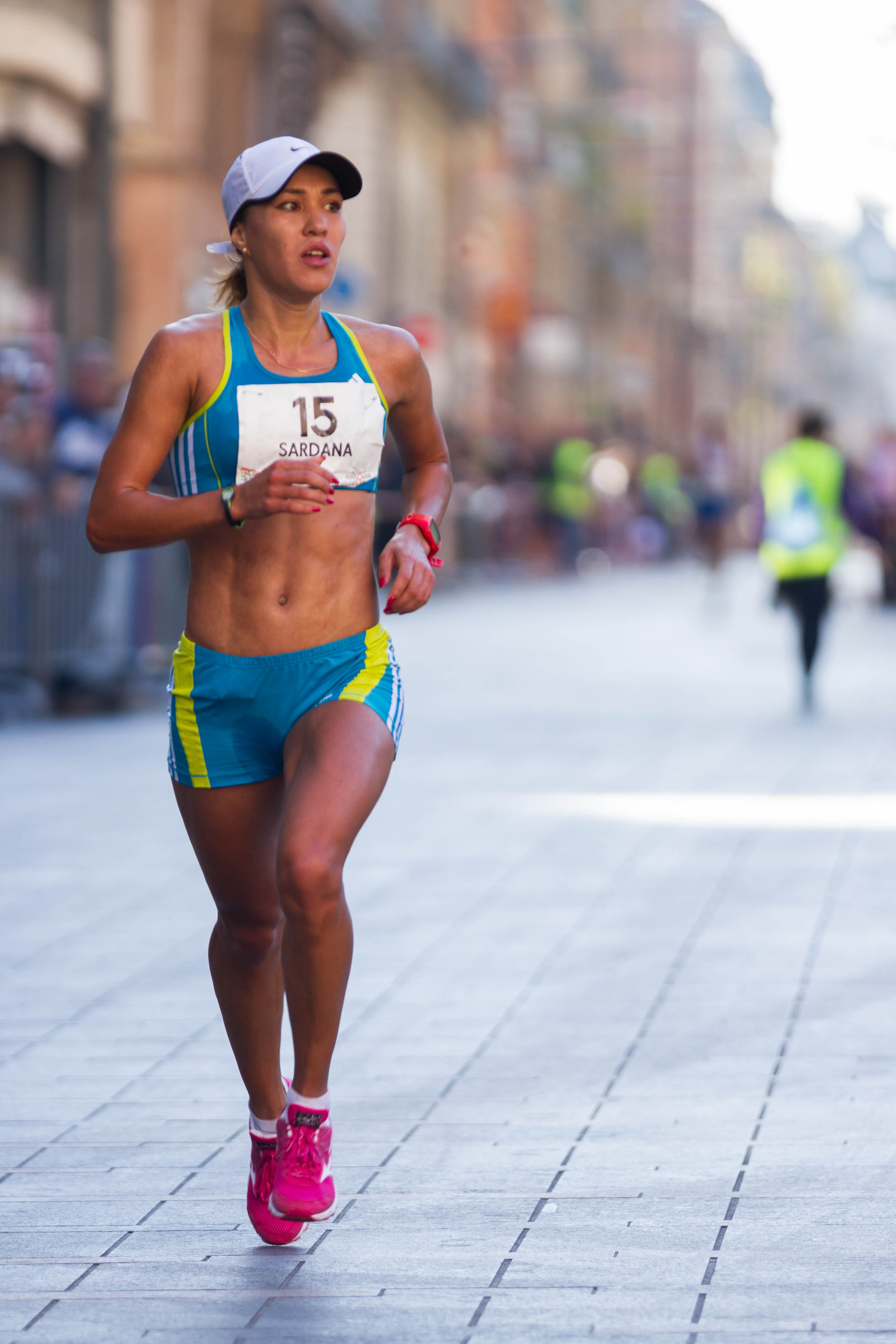
- Sardana Trofimova in 2014

Personal information
- Full name: Sardana Aleksandrovna Trofimova
- Born: 28 March 1988 (age 38) Yakutsk, Russian SFSR, Soviet Union

Sport
- Country: Kyrgyzstan
- Sport: Long-distance running
Medal record
Women's athletics
Representing Kyrgyzstan
Asian Games
Bronze medal – third place	2022 Hangzhou	marathon

Sardana Aleksandrovna Trofimova (Russian: Сардана Александровна Трофимова; born 28 March 1988) is a Russian and Kyrgyzstani long-distance runner. She competed in the women's marathon at the 2019 World Athletics Championships held in Doha, Qatar. She finished in 22nd place.

In 2014, she won the Toulouse Marathon held in Toulouse, France, and her winning time of 2:28:18 is still that city marathon's course record.

She won the Moscow Marathon three times, in 2017, 2018 and 2020.

== International competitions ==
Representing Authorised Neutral Athletes
Year	Competition	Venue	Position	Event	Result	Notes
2019	World Championships	Doha, Qatar	22nd	Marathon	2:52:46	
