= Belfast Marathon =

Mass sport event in Northern Ireland

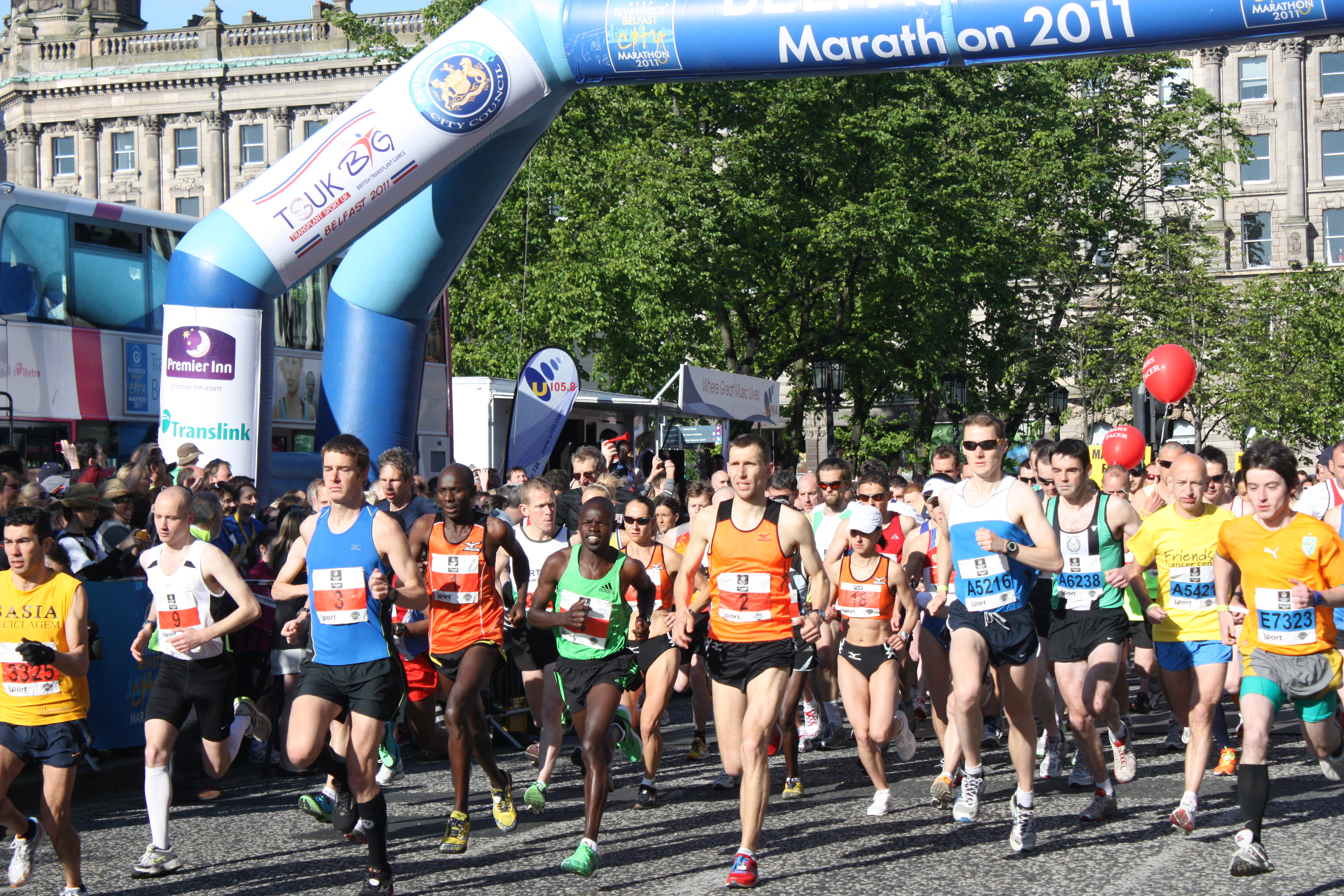
- Inflatable archway, outside Belfast City Hall, at the start of 2011 event
- Date: Early May
- Location: Belfast, Northern Ireland
- Event type: Marathon
- Distance: 26.2 miles (42.2 km)
- Primary sponsor: Moy Park
- Established: 1982
- Course records: Men's: 2:13:41 (2012) (Ethiopia) Negewo Ararisa; Women's: 2:35:03 (2024) (Kenya) Beatrice Jepkemei
- Website: Belfast Marathon
- Participants: >5,700 (2021)

The Belfast City Marathon takes place in Belfast in Northern Ireland. The organisers describe it as the "largest mass sport participatory event in Northern Ireland" with between 15,000 and 18,000 participants taking part in several events. These events, typically scheduled over the May bank holiday weekend, include marathon, wheelchair race, team relay and 8-mile walk events. The organisers also stage Northern Ireland's largest half marathon event, which takes place annually in September.

== Marathon ==
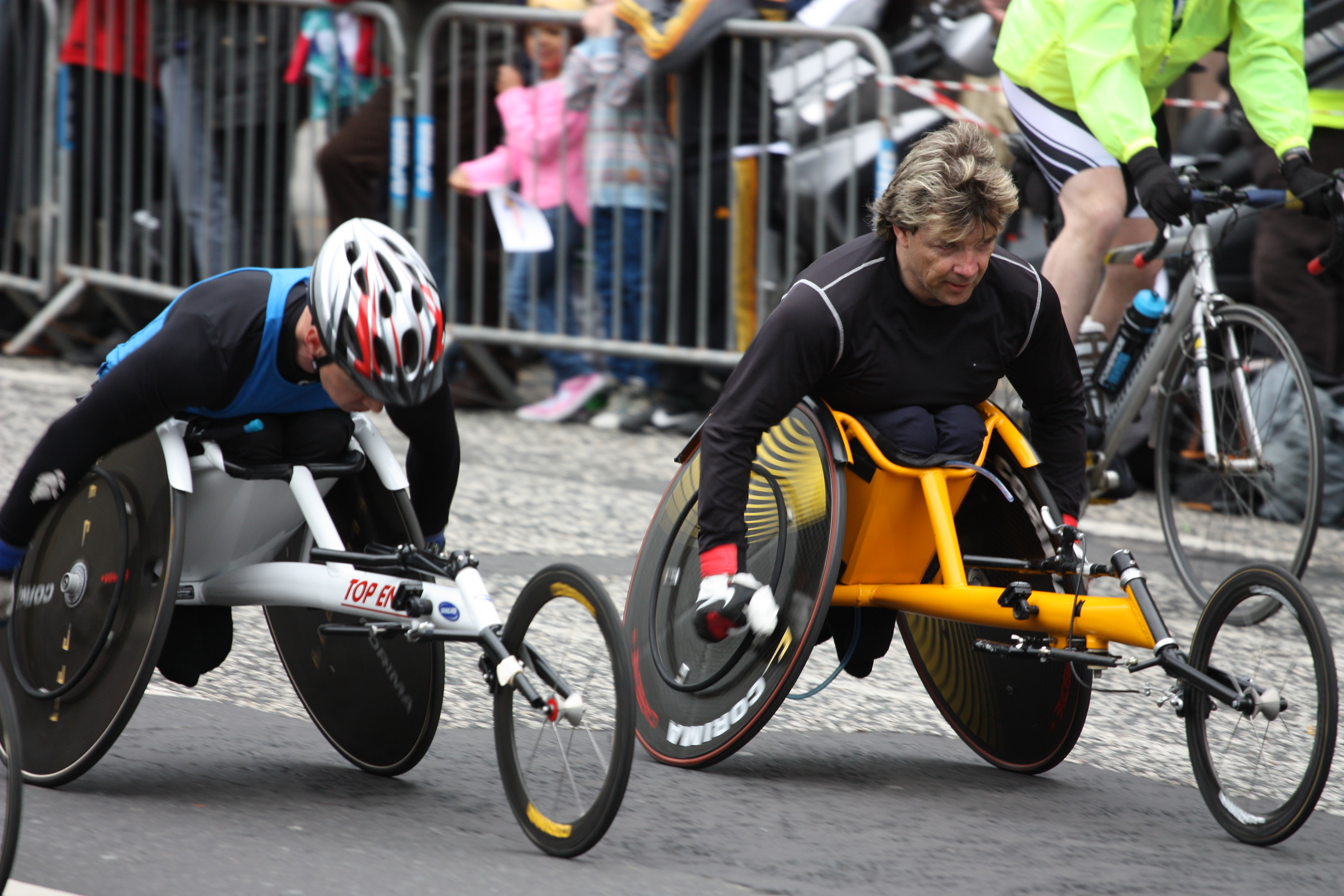
Participants in 2013 event

The Belfast City Marathon is an AIMS certified race. The race traditionally starts at Stormont Estate at 9am and finishes in Ormeau Park.

5,000 runners took part in the 2019 "full marathon". Following this event, organisers apologised after it was noted that the course was 0.3 miles longer than the typical marathon standard.

The 2020 edition of the race was cancelled as a response to the COVID-19 pandemic in Northern Ireland, with all registrants given the option of either running the race virtually or transferring their entry to 2021, 2022 or 2023. The 2021 event was rescheduled from May to October 2021.

Previously sponsored by Deep River Rock, the 2022 event (scheduled for May 2022) was reported to be Mash Direct.

== Half marathon ==
First launched in 2013, the Belfast City Half Marathon is an extension of the May Marathon event. The race starts at Ormeau Park.

== Winners ==
Year	Male Athlete	Country	Time	Female Athlete	Country	Time
1982	Gregory Hannon	Northern Ireland	2:20:25	Susan Boreham	Northern Ireland	3:11:26
1983	Paul Craig	Northern Ireland	2:20:14	Roma McConville	Northern Ireland	2:58:07
1984	Andy Daly	Scotland	2:18:01	Theresa Kidd	Northern Ireland	2:47:33
1985	Marty Deane	Northern Ireland	2:15:51	Moira O'Boyle	Northern Ireland	2:45:40
1986	Marty Deane	Northern Ireland	2:16:05	Moira O'Neill	Northern Ireland	2:43:26
1987	Calum Bark	Scotland	2:17:47	Theresa Kidd	Northern Ireland	2:48:28
1988	Thomas Hughes	Northern Ireland	2:19:00	Theresa Kidd	Northern Ireland	2:49:10
1989	Ian Bloomfield	England	2:20:45	Rosaleen Hayden	Ireland	2:58:31
1990	Jerry Kiernan	Ireland	2:18:58	Eleanor Hill	Ireland	2:50:07
1991	Joel Kipchumba	Kenya	2:18:56	Brenda McNamara	Ireland	2:55:25
1992	Jerry Kiernan	Ireland	2:20:52	Catherine Smyth	Ireland	2:42:41
1993	Gerard McGrath	Ireland	2:18:12	Catherine Smyth	Ireland	2:45:05
1994	Terry Mitchell	Scotland	2:20:24	Catherine Smyth	Ireland	2:44:42
1995	John Ferrin	Northern Ireland	2:18:42	Patricia Griffin	Ireland	2:53:10
1996	Terry Mitchell	Scotland	2:21:36	Trudi Thomson	Scotland	2:44:57
1997	John Ferrin	Northern Ireland	2:20:17	Olive Nolan	Ireland	2:55:10
1998	Thomas Hughes	Northern Ireland	2:23:33	Jackie Newton	England	2:57:25
1999	Samuel Okemwa	Kenya	2:20:58	Barbara Brewer	Northern Ireland	2:58:49
2000	Wilson Cheruiyot	Kenya	2:24:13	Mary Jennings	Ireland	3:02:31
2001	Joseph Riri	Kenya	2:26:00	Debra Curley	England	2:56:05
2002	Simon Pride	Scotland	2:22:21	Trudi Thomson	Scotland	2:49:39
2003	Lezan Kimutai	Kenya	2:17:09	Trudi Thomson	Scotland	2:45:48
2004	Peter Edukan	Kenya	2:23:51	Julia Myatt	England	2:52:52
2005	Eric Kiplagat	Kenya	2:22:20	Lemma Urge	Ethiopia	2:41:33
2006	Stephen Ndungu	Kenya	2:16:51	Joyce Kandie	Kenya	2:43:11
2007	John Mutai	Kenya	2:16:24	Desse Demelesh	Ethiopia	2:46:45
2008	John Mutai	Kenya	2:16:31	Marshet Jimma	Ethiopia	2:39:22
2009	John Mutai	Kenya	2:17:35	Joyce Kandie	Kenya	2:47:44
2010	Urga Negewo	Ethiopia	2:16:53	Sarah Stradling	England	2:44:03
2011	Jacob Chesire	Kenya	2:14:56	Vera Ovcharuk	Ukraine	2:46:04
2012	Negewo Ararisa	Ethiopia	2:13:41	Alice Chelangat	Kenya	2:39:02
2013	Joel Kipsang	Kenya	2:19:28	Nataliya Lehonkova	Ukraine	2:36:50
2014	Freddy Sittuk	Kenya	2:18:30	Bayrush Shiferaw	Ethiopia	2:41:20
2015	Joel Kositany	Kenya	2:19:36	Berhan Gebremichael	Ethiopia	2:40:57
2016	Joel Kositany	Kenya	2:17:39	Berhan Gebremichael	Ethiopia	2:48:26
2017	Bernard Rotich	Kenya	2:16:04	Laura Graham	United Kingdom	2:41:47
2018	Eric Koech	Kenya	2:18:19	Caroline Chepkwony	Kenya	2:41:23
2019	Joel Kositany	Kenya	2:18:41	Caroline Jepchirchir	Kenya	2:36:39
2020	cancelled as part of the response to the COVID-19 pandemic in Northern Ireland					
2021	Mick Clohisey	Ireland	2:20:42	Fionnuala Ross	Ireland	2:43:42
2022	Paul Pollock	Ireland	2:16:16	Gladys Ganiel	Ireland	2:43:49
2023	Mohamed Oumaarir	Morocco	2:22:54	Shewaye Woldemeskel	Ethiopia	2:37:20
2024	Mathew Kemboi	Kenya	2:14:44	Beatrice Jepkemei	Kenya	2:35:03
2025	Tilahun Nigussie	Ethiopia	2:13:37	Millicent Kibet	Kenya	2:38:30
