= Asmirach Nega =

Ethiopian long-distance runner

Personal information
- Nationality: Ethiopian
- Born: 8 June 1999 (age 26)

Sport
- Sport: Athletics
- Event(s): Long-distance running (10K, Half Marathon, Marathon), Steeplechase

Asmirach Nega (born 8 June 1999) is an Ethiopian long-distance runner. She competes primarily in road running events, including the marathon and half marathon, and previously specialized in the 3000 metres steeplechase. Nega gained international attention after winning the 2024 Dublin Marathon in a course record time of 2:24:13.

== Early life ==
Asmirach Nega was born on 8 June 1999.

== Career ==
Nega began her athletics career as a steeplechase runner, finishing in the top eight at the World U20 Championships. She won the Ethiopian national title in the 3000 metres steeplechase in 2022, setting a personal best of 9:30.46 in Hawassa.

In 2023, she moved to road racing and found early success. She won the Lillestrøm Half Marathon in Norway (1:11:30) and the Korso Half Marathon in Finland (1:11:46), and placed sixth in the Adizero Road to Records 10K in Germany, setting a personal best of 33:10.

Her marathon breakthrough came at the 2024 Dublin Marathon, where she won in 2:24:13, breaking the course record. She pulled away from defending champion Sorome Negash in the final stretch, leading an Ethiopian sweep of the podium with Negash and Grete Dukale finishing second and third.

== Major competition results ==
Nega's key achievements include a top-eight finish at the World U20 Championships and a national title in the 3000 metres steeplechase in 2022. On the roads, she won half marathons in Lillestrøm and Korso, placed sixth in the Adizero Road to Records 10K, and claimed the 2024 Dublin Marathon in a course record time of 2:24:13.

== Personal bests ==
As of May 2025, Nega's personal best times are:

- 3000 metres steeplechase – 9:30.46 (Hawassa, 25 May 2022)
- Half Marathon – 1:11:30 (Lillestrøm, 22 April 2023)
- 10K Road – 33:10 (Herzogenaurach, 18 November 2023)
- Marathon – 2:24:13 (Dublin, 27 October 2024)
