= Gerry O'Rourke =

Irish wheelchair racer

Sport
- Country: Ireland
- Sport: Paralympic athletics
- Disability class: A1
Medal record
sport
Representing Ireland
Paralympic Games
Silver medal – second place	1984 New York	400m A1-3
Bronze medal – third place	1984 New York	100m A1-3
Bronze medal – third place	1984 New York	800m A1-3

Gerry O'Rourke is a former Irish wheelchair athlete. At the 1984 Summer Paralympics, he won a silver medal in the 400 metre wheelchair race and a bronze in both the 100 and 800 metre races. In 1986, he won the fourth London Marathon men's wheelchair race, defeating the 1985 and 1987 champion Chris Hallam after Hallam was slowed by illness and mechanical problems. He is also a three-time winner of the Dublin Marathon.
