= Roman Kejžar =

Slovenian long-distance runner

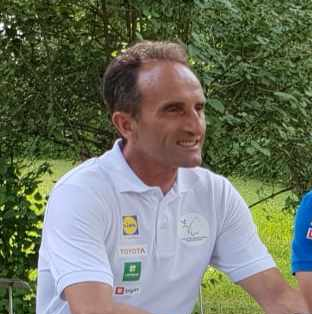
- Roman Kejžar in 2021

Personal information
- Nationality: Slovenia
- Born: 11 February 1966 (age 60) Kranj, SR Slovenia, SFR Yugoslavia
- Height: 1.73 m (5 ft 8 in)
- Weight: 62 kg (137 lb)

Sport
- Sport: Athletics
- Event: Marathon
- Club: AK Velenje

Achievements and titles
- Personal bests: Half-marathon: 1:02:49 (2000); Marathon: 2:11:50 (2000)

Roman Kejžar (born 11 February 1966 in Kranj) is a Slovenian long-distance and marathon runner. He is a three-time Olympian, and a 2004 national marathon champion. He also set both a national record and a personal best time of 2:11:50 at the 2000 Turin Marathon, earning him a spot on the Slovenian team for the Olympics.

At age thirty-four, Kejzar made his official debut for the 2000 Summer Olympics in Sydney, where he placed sixty-second out of a hundred runners in the men's marathon, with a time of 2:26:38, fourteen seconds behind Tanzania's Zebedayo Bayo. He displayed a stellar performance at the 2004 Summer Olympics in Athens, when he finished fifty-fourth in the marathon for the second time, posting his best Olympic career time of 2:23:34.

Eight years after competing in his first Olympics, Kejzar qualified for his third Slovenian team, as a 42-year-old, at the 2008 Summer Olympics in Beijing, by placing nineteenth and reaching an A-standard time of 2:17:26 from the 2007 Berlin Marathon. He successfully finished the race in sixty-seventh place by nine seconds behind Mexico's Francisco Bautista, with a time of 2:29:37.
