= Jerry Kiernan =

Irish long-distance runner (1953–2021)

Jeremiah "Fran" Kiernan (31 May 1953 – 21 January 2021) was an Irish long-distance runner.

== Biography ==
Kiernan was born in Listowel, County Kerry. He represented his native country at the 1984 Summer Olympics in Los Angeles, California, where he finished in ninth place in the men's marathon. His teammate, John Treacy, claimed silver in the same race. Kiernan twice won the Dublin Marathon, in 1982 and 1992, as well as in Belfast in 1990 and in 1992. He also won the national cross country title in 1984. A former Irish record holder over 3000 metres, Kiernan was a sub-four-minute mile runner being the seventh Irish runner to break that barrier in June 1976.

Kiernan represented Ireland 17 times between 1975 and 1993, competing seven times in world cross-country championships, and won five Irish titles, from the 1,500m to the marathon, and also national inter-club and inter-county cross-country titles.

His running club in Dublin was Clonliffe Harriers. Kiernan coached many athletes including Ciara Mageean and trained regularly in the UCD campus.

He was a regular part of RTÉ's athletics television coverage.

== Achievements ==
- All results regarding marathon, unless stated otherwise

Year	Competition	Venue	Position	Notes
Representing Ireland
1984	Olympic Games	Los Angeles, United States	9th	2:12:20

== Personal life ==
Kiernan taught at St. Brigid's Boys School, Foxrock, for approximately 40 years until retiring in June 2013.

Kiernan died on 21 January 2021, aged 67.

== See also ==
- Ireland at the 1984 Summer Olympics
- 1984 in athletics (track and field)
