= Moscow Marathon =

Annual race in Russia since 2013

- Date: Third Sunday of September
- Location: Moscow, Russia
- Event type: Road
- Distance: Marathon
- Established: 2013 (13 years ago)
- Course records: Men's: 2:11:34 (2024) (Morocco) Bennar Youness; Women's: 2:28:02 (2020) (Russia) Sardana Trofimova
- Website: Moscow Marathon
- Participants: 9,350 (2020); 10,555 (2019)

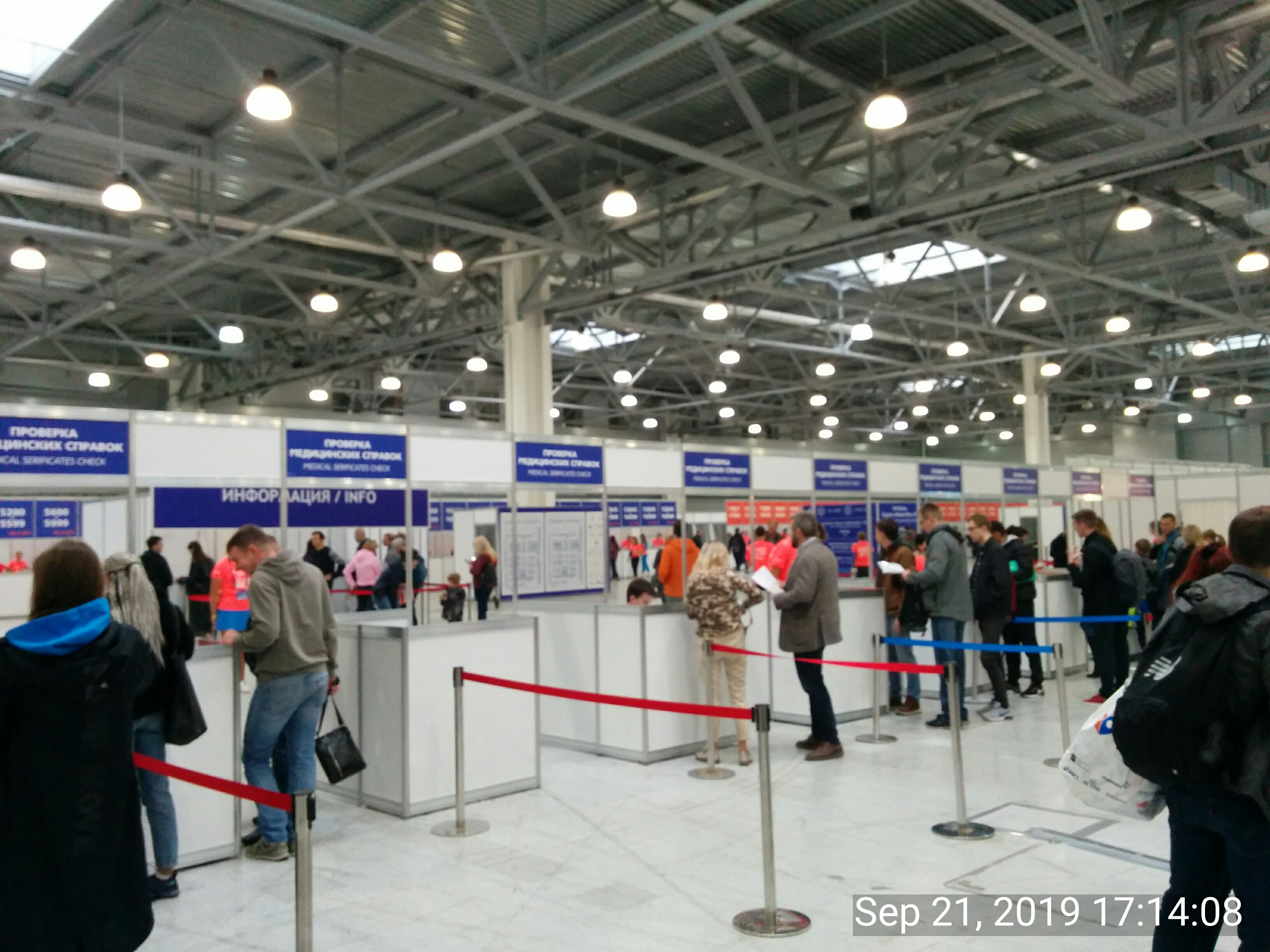
Submitting medical certificates, 2019

The Moscow Marathon is a running and sporting event held annually in Moscow, Russia. The official marathon distance of 42.195 kilometers (26 miles 385 yards) is set up as a citywide road race where professional athletes and amateur runners jointly participate. First initiated in 2013, as a successor of Moscow International Peace Marathon (est. 1980), the event traditionally takes place on the last weekend in September.

Moscow Marathon is certified by World Athletics. It is a member of AIMS.

The race was canceled in 2021 due to the COVID-19 pandemic.

== Course ==
External images
- Marathon course
- Moscow Marathon course map 2016
- Moscow Marathon course map 2016 (10 km)
- Course IAAF certificate 42 km
- Course IAAF certificate 10 km

The marathon is run over a largely flat course around the Moskva, and spans 42.195 km (26.219 mi), but with partially high elevation up to 100 m.

== Winners ==
Key: Course record (in bold)

Year	Male Winner	Country	Time	Female Winner	Country	Time	Rf.
2013	Oleksandr Matviichuk	Ukraine	2:19:36	Irina Smolnikova	Kazakhstan	2:44:54	
2014	Salomon Barngetuny	Kenya	2:17:20	Irina Smolnikova	Kazakhstan	2:40:22	
2015	Lazarus Kiptoo	Kenya	2:19:36	Nina Podnebesnova	Russia	2:33:10	
2016	Artem Alekseev	Russia	2:13:40	Tatyana Aryasova	Russia	2:32:34	
2017	Artem Alekseev	Russia	2:14:15	Sardana Trofimova	Russia	2:30:29	
2018	Stepan Kiselev	Russia	2:15:22	Sardana Trofimova	Russia	2:28:31	
2019	Iskander Yadgarov	Russia	2:18:02	Marina Kovaleva	Russia	2:29:26	
2020	Yuriy Chechun	Russia	2:16:07	Sardana Trofimova	Russia	**2:28:02**	
2021	canceled due to COVID-19 pandemic						
2022	Iskander Yadgarov	Russia	2:14:37	Marina Kovaleva	Russia	2:29:08	
2023	Dmitry Nedelin	Russia	2:14:01	Luiza Dmitrieva	Russia	2:30:15	
2024	Bennar Youness	Morocco	**2:11:34**	Morozova Alexandra	Russia	2:30:35	

== Participants ==
Date	Distance	Enrolled	Finishers	Male	Female
20.09.2020	42,195 км	9782	9370	7793	1577
20.09.2020	10 км	12088	11896	6214	5682
22.09.2019	42.195 km	10818	10555	8716	1839
22.09.2019	10 km	12860	12699	6421	6278
23.09.2018	42.195 km	9181	8761	7259	1502
23.09.2018	10 km	12996	12696	6290	6406
24.09.2017	42.195 km	-	7680	6479	1201
24.09.2017	10 km	-	12972	6586	6386
25.09.2016	42.195 km	-	7813	6603	1210
25.09.2016	10 km	-	10944	5341	5603
20.09.2015	42.195 km	-	5566	4675	891
20.09.2015	10 km	-	8105	4119	3986
21.09.2014	42.195 km	4260	4031	3500	531
21.09.2014	10 km	5302	5267	2977	2290
15.09.2013	42.195 km	-	2366	2084	282
15.09.2013	10 km	-	2412	1494	918
