= Berhanu Shiferaw =

Ethiopian long-distance runner

Berhanu Shiferaw Tolcha (born 31 May 1993) is an Ethiopian long-distance runner who specialises in the marathon. His best of 2:04:48 hours ranks him in the all-time top twenty for the event, as of 2016.

== Career ==
He started his career as a steeplechaser and represented Ethiopia in that event at the 2009 World Youth Championships in Athletics, finishing in fifth place. He soon transitioned to road running and set a best of 1:01:25 hours to finish third at the 2010 Rabat Half Marathon. His marathon debut came the year after, with a sixth-place finish at the Marrakesh Marathon, then fourth at the Ljubljana Marathon with a time of 2:09:19 hours. He fell to fifth place at the 2012 Milan Marathon, but then took his first career victories over the distance in Ljubljana and Taiyuan.

Berhanu had his breakout performance at the 2013 Dubai Marathon. In a quick race, he was runner-up to Lelisa Desisa with a time of 2:04:48 hours. The performance surprised athletes and coaches alike, given his improvement of over four minutes. This placed him in the all-time top twenty athletes for the distance. Reflecting the development of the event, this only placed sixth on the season's lists for 2013. He was slated for the 2013 Rotterdam Marathon but had to withdraw due to injury. He was absent from competition for more than two years.

Upon his return to competition in 2015, he was far from his previous form. He was ninth at the Seoul International Marathon with 2:11:01 hours and failed to finish the Gold Coast Marathon. His time at the Beijing Marathon was relatively slow at 2:11:37 hours, but was enough for second place behind Mariko Kiplagat Kipchumba.

== Personal bests ==
- Half marathon – 1:01:41 (2010
- Marathon – 2:04:48 (2013)
- 2000 metres steeplechase – 5:37.32 min (2009)
- 3000 metres steeplechase – 8:34.30 min (2015)

== International competitions ==
Year	Competition	Venue	Position	Event	Notes
2009	World Youth Championships	Bressanone, Italy	5th	2000 m s'chase	5:37.32

== Road wins ==
- Ljubljana Marathon: 2012
- Taiyuan Marathon: 2012
