= John Mutai =

Kenyan long-distance runner (born 1966)

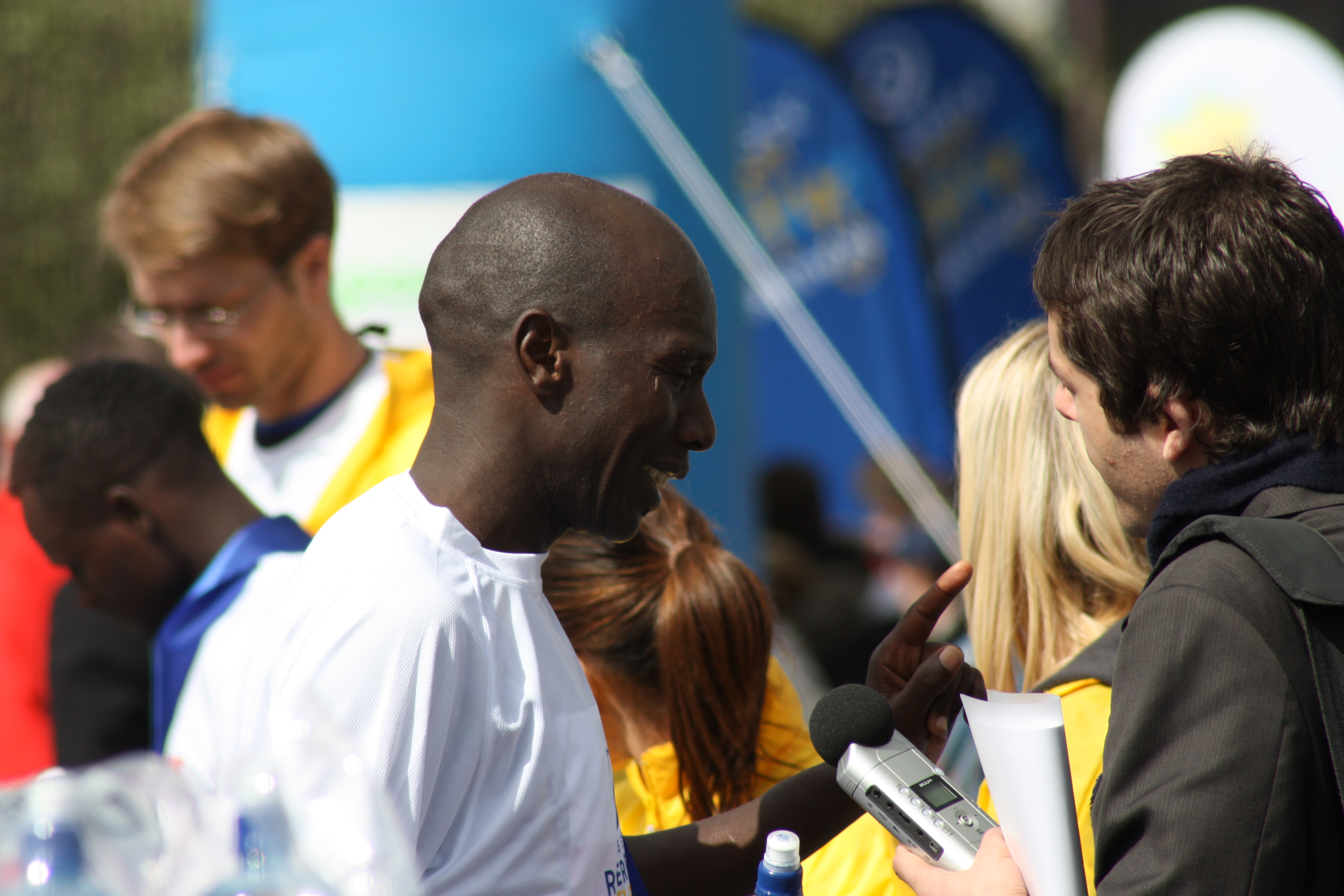
- John Mutai in 2010 after running up in the Belfast Marathon

Personal information
- Full name: John Mutai
- Nationality: Kenyan
- Born: May 26, 1966 (age 60)

Sport
- Club: Bromsgrove & Redditch
- Updated on 27 October 2013

John Mutai (born 26 May 1966) is a Kenyan long-distance runner.

== Career ==
Mutai received much media attention following his three successive victories at the Belfast Marathon, including from the BBC, who called the victories a "hat-trick". His other notable race results are:

- Fourth in the Great Capital Run in 2007.
- First in the Edinburgh Marathon in 2004, second in 2005.
- BUPA great north run half marathon 2002 5
- 7 in the BUPA Great South Run 2001
- First in the Standard Chartered Marathon (Singapore)
- Great North Run winner 1999
