= Nataliya Lehonkova =

Ukrainian marathon runner

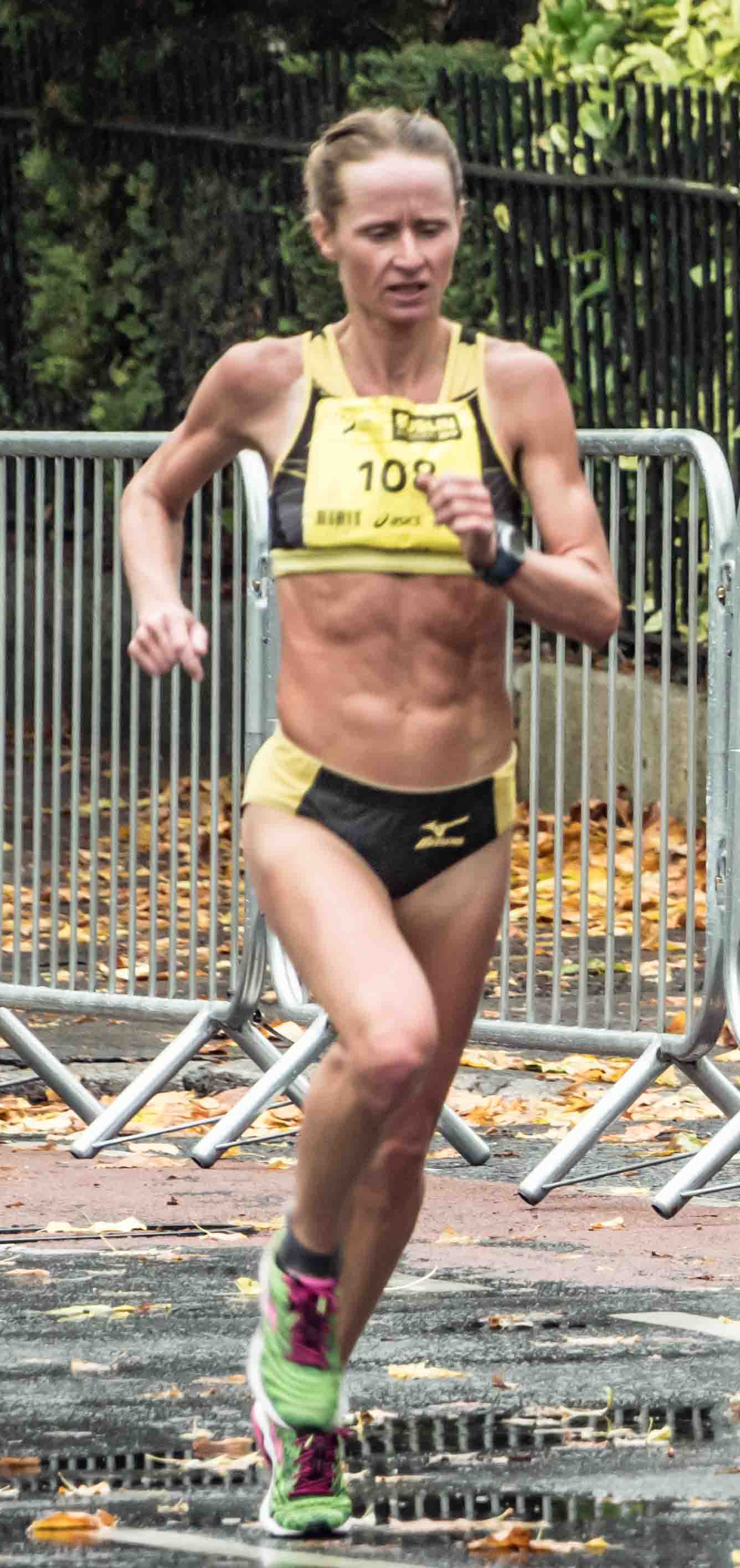
- 2015 Dublin Marathon

Personal information
- Nationality: Ukrainian
- Born: 27 December 1982 (age 43) Kazakh SSR, Soviet Union
- Height: 161 cm (5 ft 3 in)
- Weight: 48 kg (106 lb)

Sport
- Country: Ukraine
- Sport: Athletics
- Event: Marathon
- Club: Armed Forces

Achievements and titles
- Personal best: Marathon – 2:28:57 (2017)
- Updated on 31 October 2017

Nataliya Lehonkova (Ukrainian: Наталія Легонькова, born 27 December 1982) is a Ukrainian marathon runner.

== Biography ==
Lehonkova was born in the Kazakh SSR, Soviet Union (now Kazakhstan) but in 1998 moved to Berezhany, Ukraine, the native city of her mother. She is a student of the spiritual master Sri Chinmoy since 1995. She adopted the name Samunnati from Sri Chinmoy (a Sanskrit word represents height, exseltation, dignity and prosperity). Lehonkova ran her first marathon aged 16 and won the 2013 Belfast Marathon, 2015 Dublin Marathon and 2016 Los Angeles Marathon. She finished 87th at the Olympics Women's marathon in Rio 2016.

== Races and Results ==
Year	Competition	Venue	Position	Event	Notes
Representing the Ukraine
2012	Toulouse Marathon	France	1st	Marathon	2:38:22
2013	Belfast Marathon	United Kingdom	1st	Marathon	2:36:50
2015	Dublin Marathon	Ireland	1st	Marathon	2:31:09
2016	Los Angeles Marathon	United States	1st	Marathon	2:30:40
2017	Dublin Marathon	Ireland	1st	Marathon	2:28:57
