= Dublin Marathon =

Annual race in Ireland held since 1980

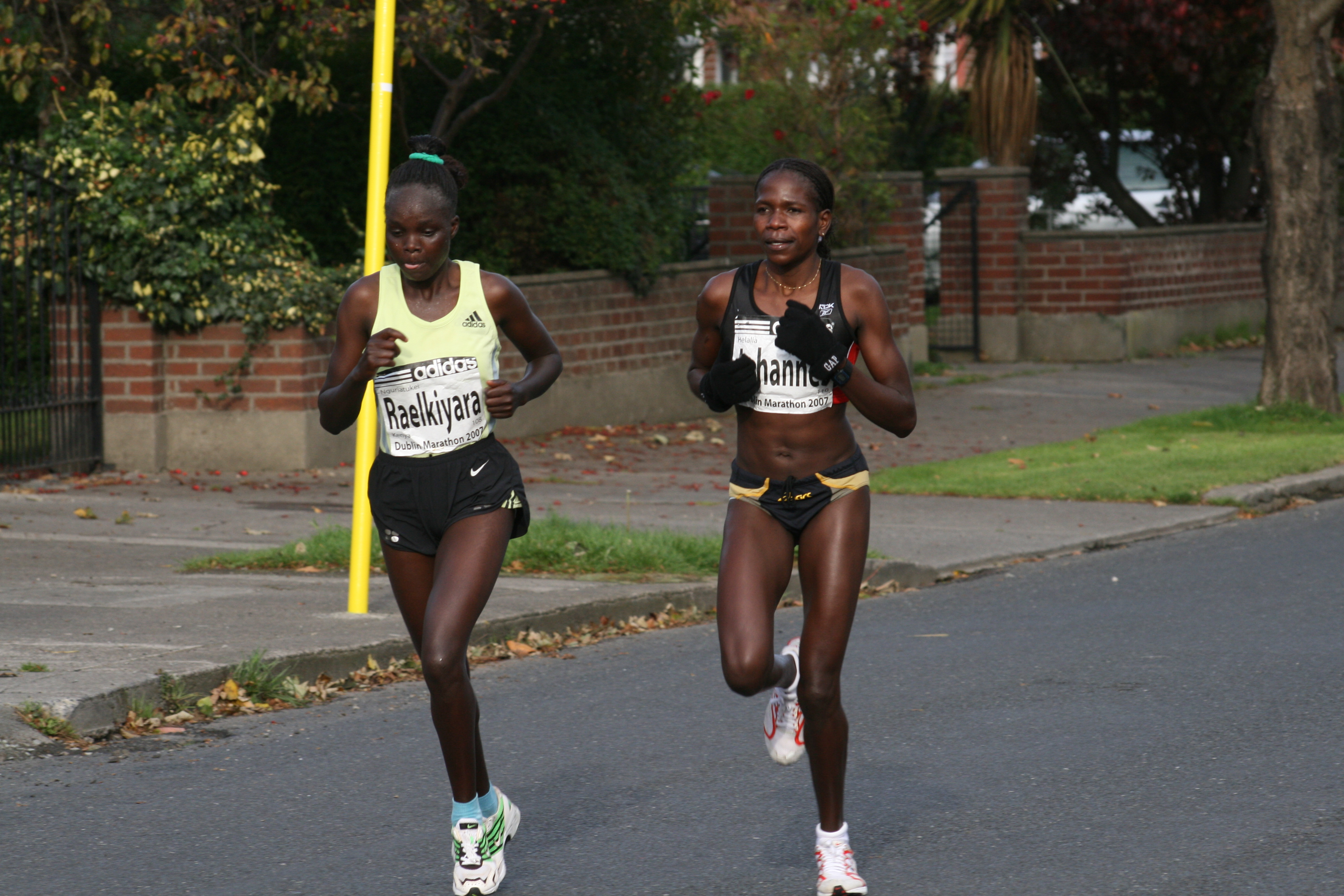
- Elite runners competing in 2007
- Date: October
- Location: Dublin, Ireland
- Event type: Road
- Distance: Marathon
- Primary sponsor: Irish Life (2022)
- Established: 1980 (46 years ago)
- Course records: Men's: 2:06:52 (2023) (Ethiopia) Kemal Husen; Women's: 2:24:13 (2024) (Ethiopia) Asmarech Nega
- Website: Dublin Marathon
- Participants: 17,729 finishers (2019); 16,166 finishers (2018)

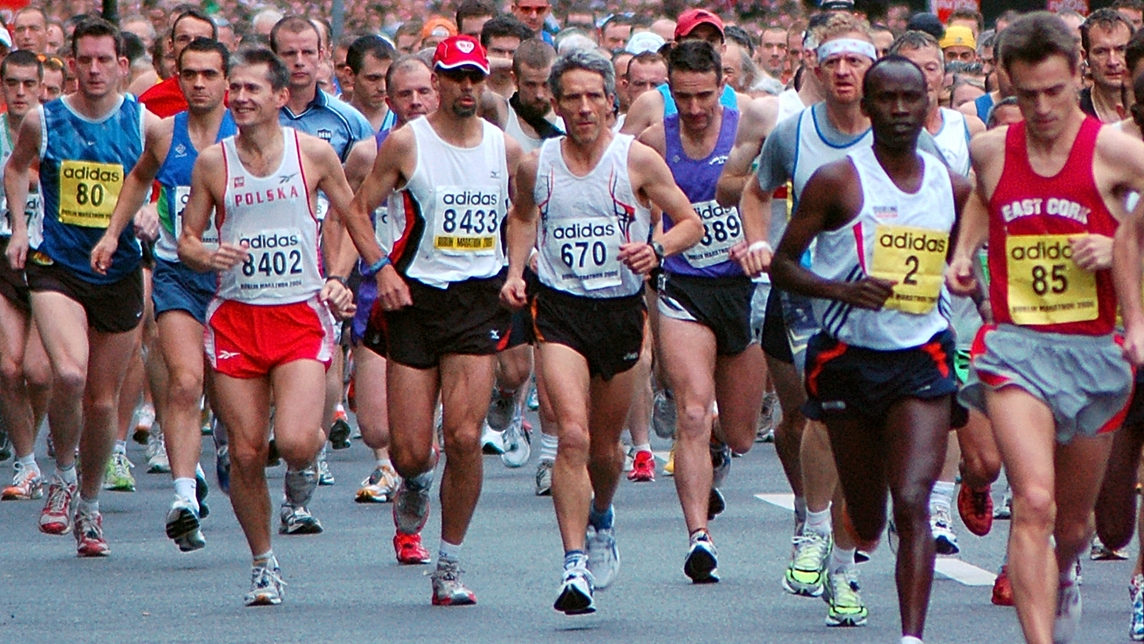
Runners in 2006

The Dublin Marathon is an annual 26.2 mile (42.2 km) road marathon in Dublin, Ireland, held on the last Sunday in October. Prior to 2016, the race took place on the last Monday in October, which is a public holiday in Ireland. Held each year since 1980, the marathon had a record 22,500 registrants for the 2019 race, including over 5,000 entrants from outside Ireland.

== History ==
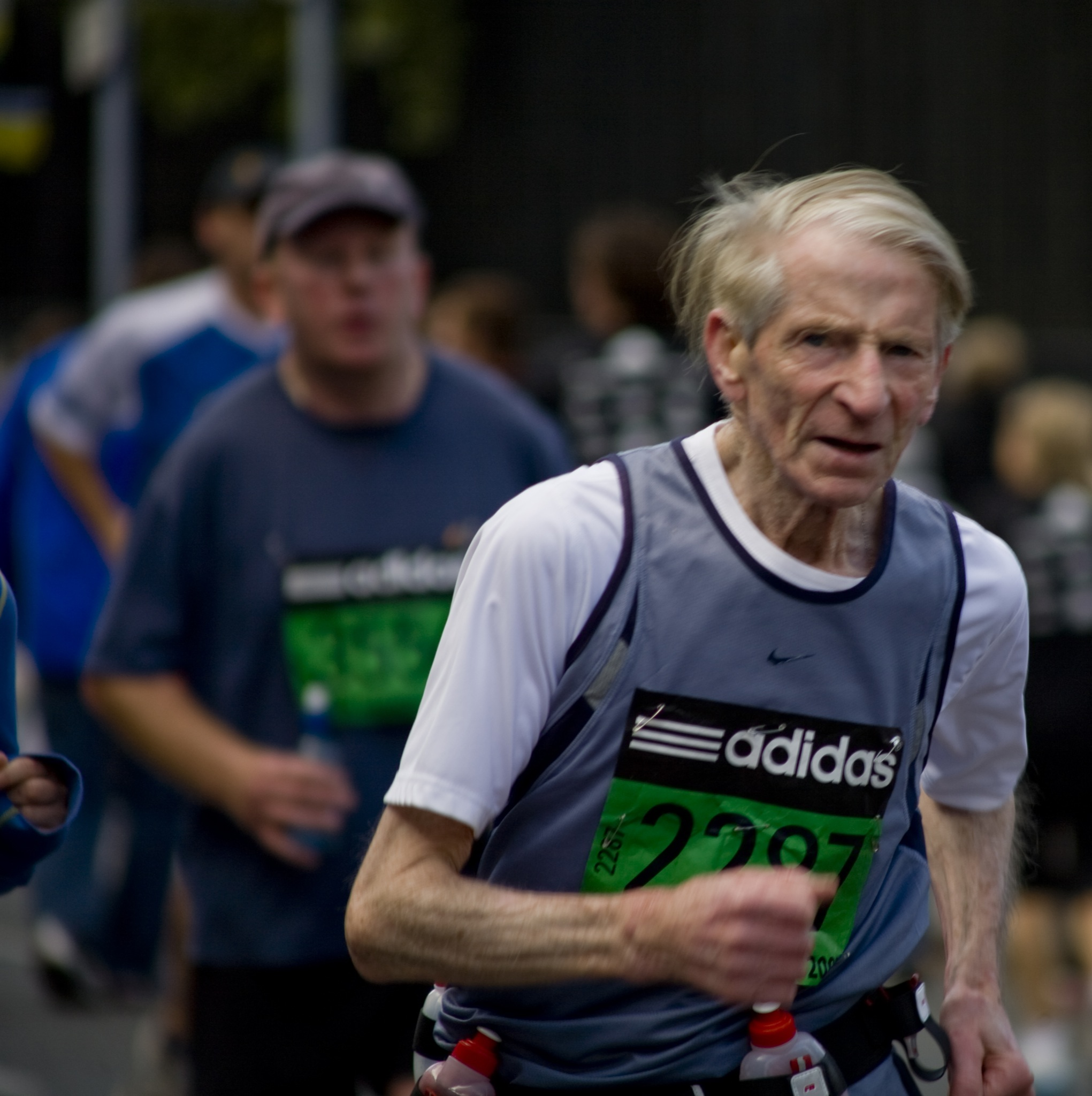
Sean Kearns, runner-up of the M75 category in 2007

The race was founded in 1980 by a group led by Noel Carroll, who persuaded the Business Houses Athletic Association (BHAA) to take up the idea. In the first year, 2,100 took part, of whom 1,420 finished. Dick Hooper of Raheny club Raheny Shamrock Athletic Club claimed first place, in a time of 2:16:14. The women's winner was Carey May who finished in 2:42:11. That year's runner-up was Neil Cusack, who returned in 1981 to post a winning time of 2:13:59.

Jerry Kiernan's 1982 time of 2:13:45 was a long-standing men's course record. This was finally improved upon by Lezan Kipkosgei Kimutai over twenty years later in 2004, but Russian runner Aleksey Sokolov twice broke the record with consecutive wins in 2006/07, running 2:11:39 then 2:09:07 the next year. Moses Kangogo Kibet became the first man under 2:09 in Dublin with his win in 2:08:58. The current men's record is 2:08:06 set by Othmane El Goumri in 2019.

Moira O'Neill was the first woman under two hours and forty minutes with her win of 2:37:06 in 1988 and home athlete Christine Kennedy improved this with a run of 2:35:56 three years later. Kenyan Ruth Kutol win in 2:27:22 in 2003 was the first sub-2:30 time and Russian Tatyana Aryasova broke this record in 2010 with her current women's record of 2:26:13.

The participation level of the race has followed an upward trend: by 1988 the number of participants had increased to 8,700 – up from the 4,000 the previous year. It was not until 2000 that the 1988 participation record was finally broken when 8,900 took part. An increasing number of people took part every year in the late 2000s, with 11,000 at the 2007 edition. Entry levels have since increased significantly year-on-year with 19,500 completing the 2016 event.

In 2001 the marathon became part of the Dublin Race Series, which includes pre-marathon events of 5 miles, 10 kilometres, 10 miles and half marathon distance over the preceding months, run in the Phoenix Park and Swords.

A competitor died while running in the 2006 marathon, and another in the 2013 marathon.

In October 2015, it was announced that from 2016 the marathon would be held on Sunday rather than the October bank holiday Monday to attract more overseas runners.

The 2020 and 2021 editions of the race were cancelled due to the coronavirus pandemic, with all entries made valid for the following year and all registrants given the option of obtaining a full refund.

== Course ==
External image
- Course map of full marathon in 2019

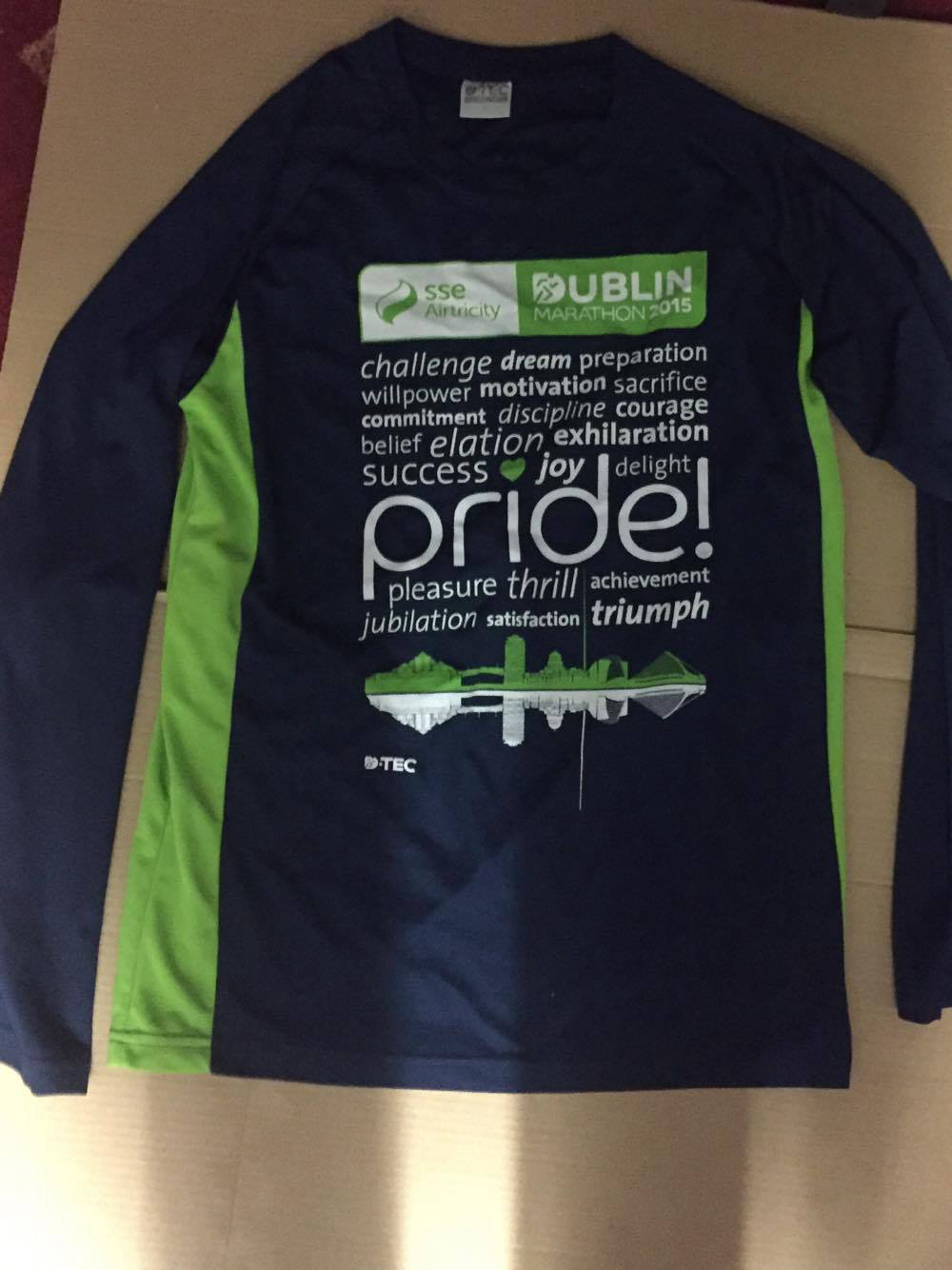
Race T-shirt from 2015

The course is generally reasonably flat. It starts at Fitzwilliam Square in the city centre and concludes at Merrion Square. Exact routing varies, although in recent years the race has proceeded in an anti-clockwise direction around the city, including passing through the Phoenix Park before moving towards the southside suburbs.

== Race series ==
The marathon is part of a race series that includes four other races: a 5 mile race in South Dublin, the Fingal 10K in Swords, and the Frank Duffy 10 Mile and the Dublin Half Marathon (both set in Phoenix Park).

== Prizes ==
The overall winner receives the Noel Carroll Memorial Trophy. Both winners also receive 12,000 EUR.

== Winners ==
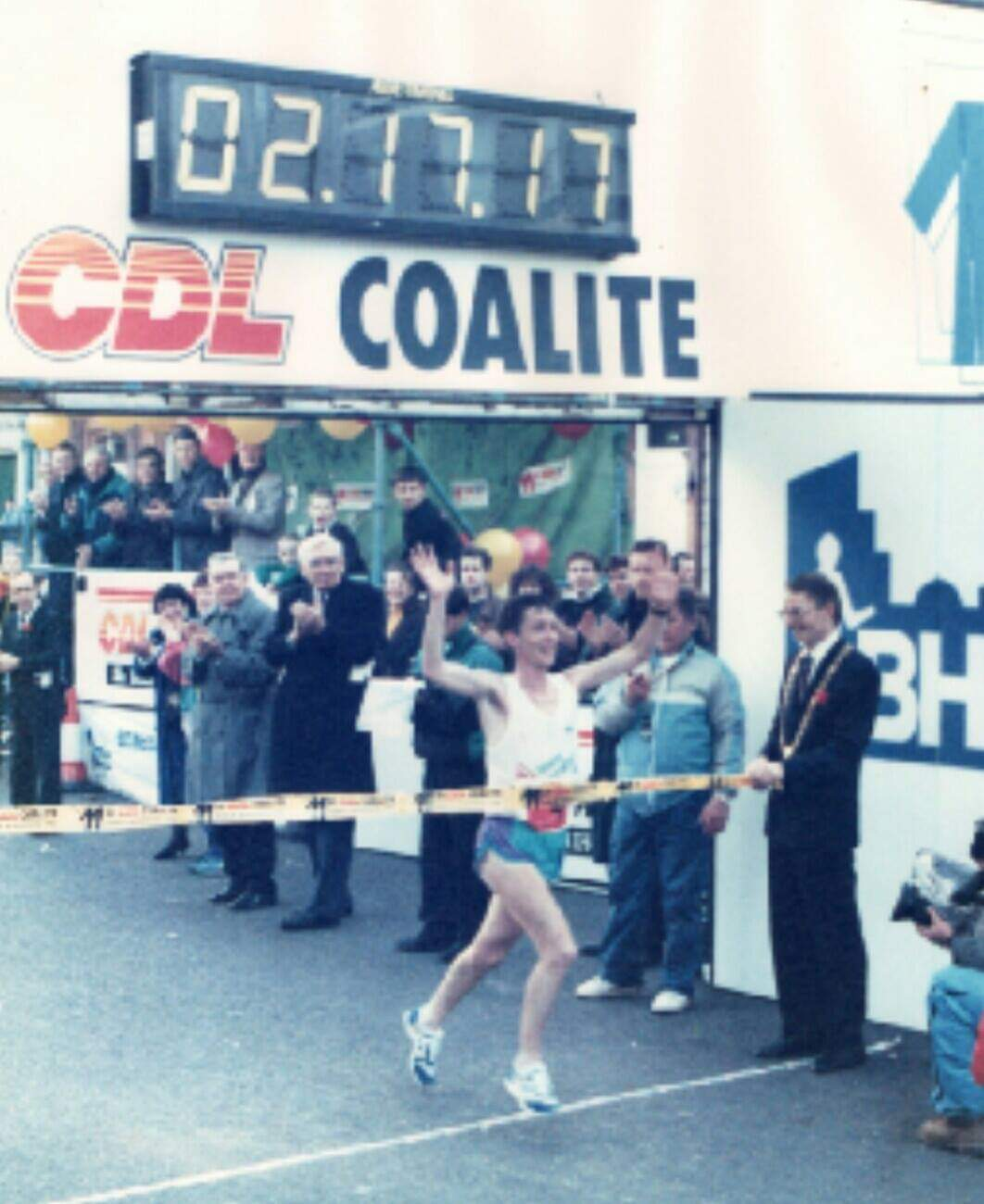
John Bolger, 1990 winner

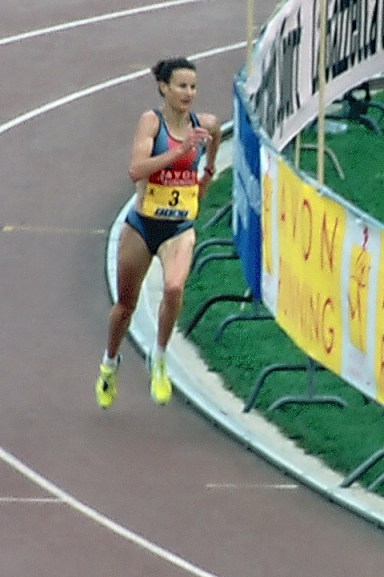
Sonia O'Sullivan, winner in 2000 (pictured here in Milan)

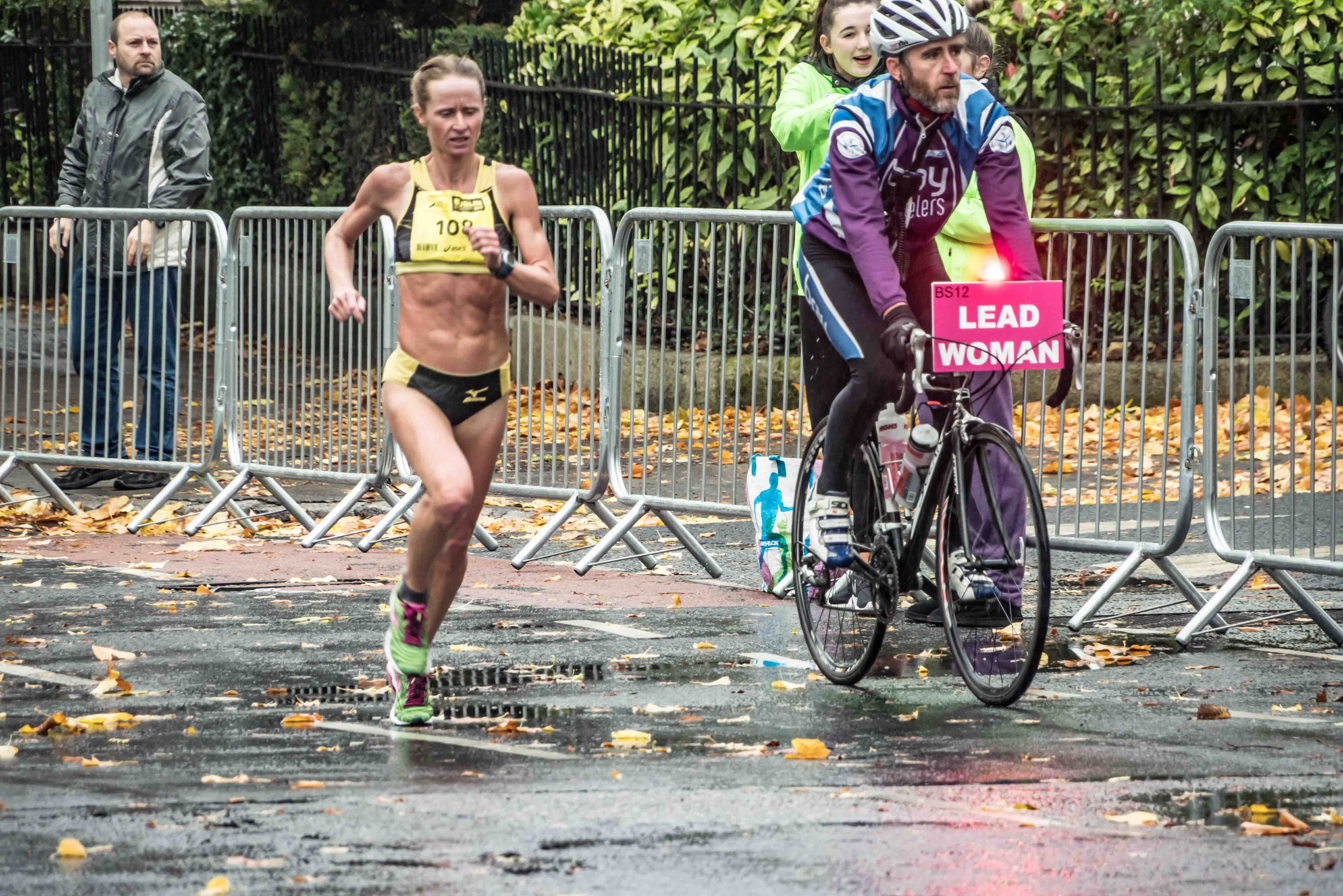
Nataliya Lehonkova, 2015 & 2017 winner

Key:

Course record (in bold)
Irish championship race

Ed.	Year	Men's winner	Time	Women's winner	Time	Rf.
1	1980	Dick Hooper (IRL)	2:16:14	Carey May (IRL)	2:42:11	
2	1981	Neil Cusack (IRL)	2:13:58	Emily Dowling (IRL)	2:48:22	
3	1982	Jerry Kiernan (IRL)	2:13:45	Debbie Mueller (USA)	2:40:57	
4	1983	Ronny Agten (BEL)	2:14:19	Mary Purcell (IRL)	2:46:09	
5	1984	Svend Erik Kristensen (DEN)	2:18:25	Ailish Smyth (IRL)	2:47:30	
6	1985	Dick Hooper (IRL)	2:13:48	Julia Gates (GBR)	2:41:26	
7	1986	Dick Hooper (IRL)	2:18:10	Maureen Hurst (GBR)	2:46:29	
8	1987	Pavel Klimeš (TCH)	2:14:21	Carolyn Naisby (GBR)	2:42:08	
9	1988	John Griffin (IRL)	2:16:02	Moira O'Neill (GBR)	2:37:06	
10	1989	John Griffin (IRL)	2:16:44	Pauline Nolan (IRL)	2:44:32	
11	1990	John Bolger (IRL)	2:17:17	Christine Kennedy (IRL)	2:41:27	
12	1991	Tommy Hughes (IRE)	2:14:46	Christine Kennedy (IRL)	2:35:56	
13	1992	Jerry Kiernan (IRL)	2:17:19	Karen Cornwall (GBR)	2:41:58	
14	1993	John Treacy (IRL)	2:14:40	Cathy Shum (IRL)	2:38:14	
15	1994	Steve Brace (GBR)	2:17:13	Linda Rushmere (GBR)	2:40:17	
16	1995	William Musyoki (KEN)	2:16:57	Trudi Thomson (GBR)	2:38:23	
17	1996	Joseph Kahugu (KEN)	2:17:42	Cathy Shum (IRL)	2:38:56	
18	1997	Joshua Kipkemboi (KEN)	2:15:56	Carol Galea (MLT)	2:39:33	
19	1998	Joshua Kipkemboi (KEN)	2:20:00	Teresa Duffy (IRL)	2:39:56	
20	1999	John Mutai (KEN)	2:15:18	Esther Kiplagat (KEN)	2:34:24	
21	2000	Simon Pride (GBR)	2:18:49	Sonia O'Sullivan (IRL)	2:35:42	
22	2001	Zacharia Mpolokeng (RSA)	2:14:03	Debbie Robinson (GBR)	2:35:40	
23	2002	Frederick Cherono (KEN)	2:14:25	Lidiya Vasilevskaya (RUS)	2:32:58	
24	2003	Onesmus Kilonzo (KEN)	2:17:03	Ruth Kutol (KEN)	2:27:22	
25	2004	Lezan Kimutai (KEN)	2:13:07	Yelena Burykina (RUS)	2:32:53	
26	2005	Dmytro Osadchyy (UKR)	2:13:14	Zinaida Semenova (RUS)	2:32:53	
27	2006	Aleksey Sokolov (RUS)	2:11:39	Alina Ivanova (RUS)	2:29:49	
28	2007	Aleksey Sokolov (RUS)	2:09:07	Alina Ivanova (RUS)	2:29:20	
29	2008	Andriy Naumov (UKR)	2:11:06	Larisa Zyuzko (RUS)	2:29:55	
30	2009	Feyisa Lilesa (ETH)	2:09:11	Kateryna Stetsenko (UKR)	2:32:45	
31	2010	Moses Kangogo (KEN)	2:08:58	Tatyana Aryasova (RUS)	2:26:13	
32	2011	Geoffrey Ndungu (KEN)	2:08:33	Helalia Johannes (NAM)	2:30:33	
33	2012	Geoffrey Ndungu (KEN)	2:11:09	Magdalene Mukunza (KEN)	2:30:46	
34	2013	Sean Hehir (IRL)	2:18:19	Maria McCambridge (IRL)	2:38:51	
35	2014	Eliud Too (KEN)	2:14:47	Esther Macharia (KEN)	2:34:15	
36	2015	Alemu Gemechu (ETH)	2:14:02	Nataliya Lehonkova (UKR)	2:31:09	
37	2016	Dereje Debele (ETH)	2:12:18	Helalia Johannes (NAM)	2:32:32	
38	2017	Bernard Rotich (KEN)	2:15:53	Nataliya Lehonkova (UKR)	2:28:57	
39	2018	Asefa Bekele (ETH)	2:13:24	Mesera Hussen (ETH)	2:33:49	
40	2019	Othmane El Goumri (MAR)	2:08:06	Motu Gedefa (ETH)	2:27:48	
	—	cancelled in 2020 and 2021 due to coronavirus pandemic				
41	2022	Taoufik Allam (MAR)	2:11:30	Nigist Mulaneh (ETH)	2:28.32	
42	2023	Kemal Husen (ETH)	**2:06:52**	Sorome Negash (ETH)	2:26:22	
43	2024	Moses Kemei (KEN)	2:08:47	Asmarech Nega (ETH)	**2:24:13**	
44	2025	Daniel Mesfin (USA)	2:08:51	Eebbissee Addunyaa (ETH)	2:26:28	
45	2026	Abay Alemu Lesa (ETH)	2:10:28	Zenebu Fikdau Jebesa (ETH)	2:24:26	

=== Wheelchair ===
Only male winners of the wheelchair division have been recorded, with the exceptions of 2002, 2004 and 2005.

Year	Men's winner	Time	Women's winner	Time	Rf.
1981	Michael Cunningham (IRL)	2:44:15	none		
1982	Gerry O'Rourke (IRL)	2:32:44	none		
1983	Gerry O'Rourke (IRL)	2:24:52	none		
1984	Gerry O'Rourke (IRL)	2:28:07	none		
1985	Gerry O'Rourke (IRL)	2:21:02	none		
1986	Gerry O'Rourke (IRL)	2:22:55	none		
1987	Gerry O'Rourke (IRL)	2:23:01	none		
1988	Andy Hynes (ENG)	2:12:57	none		
1989	Chris Hallam (WAL)	2:04:50	none		
1990	Gerry O'Rourke (IRL)	2:05:58	none		
1991	Chris Hallam (WAL)	1:53:20	none		
1992	Chris Madden (ENG)	1:53:50	none		
1993	Chris Hallam (WAL)	1:59:28	none		
1994	Richie Powell (WAL)	2:11:27	none		
1995	Roy Guerin (IRL)	2:05:47	none		
1996	John Fulham (IRL)	2:11:52	none		
1997	D Kavanagh (ENG)	2:00:16	none		
1998	John Fulham (IRL)	2:04:10	none		
1999	John Fulham (IRL)	1:59:06	none		
2000	Derek Connolly (IRL)	2:57:12	none		
2001	Kenny Herriot (SCO)	2:55:00	none		
2002	Kenny Herriot (SCO)	1:52:48	Emer Patten (IRL)	3:35:15	
2003	Kenny Herriot (SCO)	1:45:20	none		
2004	none		Emer Patten (IRL)	3:27.47	
2005	John Glynn (IRL)	2:14:08	Patrice Dockery (IRL)	2:34:29	
2006	Richie Powell (WAL)	1:55:10	none		
2007	Richie Powell (WAL)	1:59:03	none		
2008	Paul Hannan (NIR)	2:22:06	none		
2009	Richie Powell (WAL)	2:09:28	none		
2010	Paul Hannan (NIR)	2:20:38	none		
2011	Paul Hannan (NIR)	2:13:58	none		
2012	Luke Jones (WAL)	2:03:29	none		
2013	Paul Hannan (NIR)	2:34:48	none		
2014	Patrick Monahan (IRL)	1:52:43	none		
2015	Patrick Monahan (IRL)	1:43:05	none		
2016	Patrick Monahan (IRL)	1:39:18	none		
2017	Patrick Monahan (IRL)	1:49:55	none		
2018	Johnboy Smith (ENG)	1:36:12	none		
2019	Patrick Monaghan (IRL)	1:39:50	none		
—	cancelled in 2020 and 2021 due to coronavirus pandemic				
2022	Patrick Monaghan (IRL)	1:37.31	none		
2023	Patrick Monaghan (IRL)	1:41:04	none		

== Broadcast coverage ==
Years	Service	Notes
1980–1999	RTÉ	live at first, highlights for majority of run
2000–2010	TV3/Setanta Sports	highlights
2011	RTÉ	live
2012	Setanta Sports	documentary coverage, but broadcast at Christmas
2013–2014	Setanta Sports	documentary coverage
2015	no coverage	
2016	Irish TV	documentary coverage
2019	YouTube	live stream

== See also ==
- Women's Mini Marathon, a 10K run in Dublin
