= 2018 IAAF Road Race Label Events =

Road running competition series

The 2018 IAAF Road Race Label Events were the eleventh edition of the global series of road running competitions given Label status by the International Association of Athletics Federations (IAAF). The series included a total of 115 road races: 56 Gold, 26 Silver and 33 Bronze. In terms of distance, 75 races were marathons, 26 were half marathons, 9 were 10K runs, and 4 were held over other distances. The series included all six World Marathon Majors in the Gold category.

Notably during this season, Eluid Kipchoge broke the Marathon world record, lowering it to 2:01:39. Sifan Hassan also broke the Half marathon European record in 1:05:15. In October, Abraham Kiptum ran the Valencia Half Marathon in 58:18, which would have been a world record, but a year later this world record was nullified due to a doping violation.

== Races ==
- World Marathon Majors

Date	Label	Distance	Competition	Venue	Country	Men's winner	Women's winner
7 January 2018	Gold	Marathon	C&D Xiamen Marathon	Xiamen	China	Dejene Debela (ETH)	Fatuma Sado (ETH)
14 January 2018	Gold	Half marathon	Aramco Houston Half Marathon	Houston	United States	Jake Robertson (NZL)	Ruti Aga (ETH)
14 January 2018	Silver	Marathon	Chevron Houston Marathon	Houston	United States	Bazu Worku (ETH)	Biruktayit Degefa (ETH)
21 January 2018	Silver	Marathon	Standard Chartered Mumbai Marathon	Mumbai	India	Solomon Deksisa (ETH)	Amane Gobena (ETH)
21 January 2018	Gold	Marathon	Standard Chartered Hong Kong Marathon	Hong Kong	China	Kennedy Mburu (KEN)	Gulume Tollesa (ETH)
26 January 2018	Gold	Marathon	Standard Chartered Dubai Marathon	Dubai	United Arab Emirates	Mosinet Geremew (ETH)	Roza Dereje (ETH)
28 January 2018	Gold	Marathon	Osaka Women's Marathon	Osaka	Japan	n/a	Mizuki Matsuda (JPN)
4 February 2018	Silver	Half marathon	Kagawa Marugame International Half Marathon	Marugame	Japan	Edward Waweru (KEN)	Betsy Saina (KEN)
10 February 2018	Bronze	Marathon	Access Bank Lagos City Marathon	Lagos	Nigeria	Abraham Kiprotich (FRA)	Almenesh Herpa (ETH)
11 February 2018	Gold	Half marathon	eDreams Mitja Marató de Barcelona	Barcelona	Spain	Mule Wasihun (ETH)	Tejitu Daba (BHR)
18 February 2018	Bronze	Half marathon	Medio Maratón Internacional Electrolit Guadalajara	Guadalajara	Mexico	John Nzau Mwangangi (KEN)	Diana Chemtai Kipyokei (KEN)
25 February 2018	Gold	Marathon	Zurich Maratón de Seville	Seville	Spain	Dickson Tuwei (KEN)	Kaoutar Boulaid (MAR)
25 February 2018	Gold	Marathon	Tokyo Marathon	Tokyo	Japan	Dickson Chumba (KEN)	Birhane Dibaba (ETH)
4 March 2018	Gold	Marathon	Lake Biwa Mainichi Marathon	Ōtsu	Japan	Joseph Mana Ndirangu (KEN)	n/a
11 March 2018	Gold	Half marathon	EDP Meia Maratona de Lisboa	Lisbon	Portugal	Eric Kiprono Kiptanui (KEN)	Etagegne Woldu (ETH)
11 March 2018	Bronze	Marathon	Zurich Marató Barcelona	Barcelona	Spain	Anthony Maritim (KEN)	Ruth Chebitok (KEN)
11 March 2018	Gold	Half marathon	Huawei Roma-Ostia Half Marathon	Rome	Italy	Galen Rupp (USA)	Haftamnesh Tesfaye (ETH)
11 March 2018	Gold	Marathon	Nagoya Women's Marathon	Nagoya	Japan	n/a	Meskerem Assefa (ETH)
18 March 2018	Silver	Marathon	New Taipei City Wan Jin Shi Marathon	New Taipei City	Taiwan	Yuki Kawauchi (JPN)	Rael Nguriatukei Kinyara (KEN)
18 March 2018	Bronze	Half marathon	ONICO Gdynia Half Marathon	Gdynia	Poland	Ben Chelimo Somikwo (UGA)	Christine Oigo (KEN)
18 March 2018	Gold	Marathon	Seoul International Marathon	Seoul	South Korea	Wilson Loyanae Erupe (KEN)	Hirut Tibebu (ETH)
25 March 2018	Bronze	Half marathon	PZU Pólmaraton Warszawski	Warsaw	Poland	Ezrah Sang (KEN)	Polline Wanjiku (KEN)
25 March 2018	Gold	Marathon	Chongqing International Marathon	Chongqing	China	Kennedy Cheboror (KEN)	Meseret Legese (ETH)
1 April 2018	Silver	Marathon	Daegu International Marathon	Daegu	South Korea	Abraham Kiptum (KEN)	Janet Jelagat Rono (KEN)
7 April 2018	Gold	Half marathon	Sportisimo Prague Half Marathon	Prague	Czech Republic	Benard Kimeli (KEN)	Joan Chelimo Melly (KEN)
8 April 2018	Bronze	Marathon	Mangyongdae Prize Marathon	Pyongyang	North Korea	Kang Bom Ri (PRK)	Hye Gyong Kim (PRK)
8 April 2018	Gold	Marathon	Schneider Electric Marathon de Paris	Paris	France	Paul Lonyangata (KEN)	Betsy Saina (KEN)
8 April 2018	Gold	Marathon	NN Marathon Rotterdam	Rotterdam	Netherlands	Kenneth Kiprop Kipkemoi (KEN)	Visiline Jepkesho (KEN)
8 April 2018	Gold	Half marathon	Vodafone Istanbul Half Marathon	Istanbul	Turkey	Amedework Walelegn (ETH)	Ababel Yeshaneh (ETH)
8 April 2018	Silver	Marathon	HAJ Hannover Marathon	Hannover	Germany	Seboka Negusse (ETH)	Agnes Kiprop (KEN)
8 April 2018	Silver	Marathon	EA7 Emporio Armani Milan Marathon	Milan	Italy	Seifu Tura (ETH)	Vivian Kiplagat (KEN)
8 April 2018	Silver	Marathon	Acea Maratona di Rome	Rome	Italy	Cosmas Birech (KEN)	Rahma Tusa (ETH)
15 April 2018	Bronze	Marathon	DOZ Marathon Łódz (& Sport Żel Half Marathon)	Łódź	Poland	Bekele Tarekegn Zewdu (ETH)	Jane Jepkosgei Kiptoo (KEN)
15 April 2018	Bronze	Marathon	Nagano Marathon	Nagano	Japan	Abdela Godana (ETH)	Asami Furuse (JPN)
16 April 2018	Gold	Marathon	B.A.A. Boston Marathon	Boston	United States	Yuki Kawauchi (JPN)	Desiree Linden (USA)
22 April 2018	Bronze	Half marathon	Nova Poshta Kyiv Half Marathon	Kyiv	Ukraine	Tesfaye Lencho Anbesa (ETH)	Viktoriia Kaliuzhna (UKR)
22 April 2018	Gold	Marathon	Vienna City Marathon	Vienna	Austria	Salah-Eddine Bounasr (MAR)	Nancy Jepkosgei Kiprop (KEN)
22 April 2018	Gold	Half marathon	Gifu Seiryu Half Marathon	Gifu	Japan	Nicholas Mboroto Kosimbei (KEN)	Degitu Azimeraw (ETH)
22 April 2018	Gold	Half marathon	Yangzhou Jianzhen International Half Marathon	Yangzhou	China	Mosinet Geremew (ETH)	Ababel Yeshaneh (ETH)
22 April 2018	Gold	Marathon	Rock 'n' Roll Madrid Maraton	Madrid	Spain	Eliud Barngetuny (KEN)	Valentine Kipketer (KEN)
22 April 2018	Silver	Marathon	Orlen Warsaw Marathon	Warsaw	Poland	Ezekiel Kemboi Omullo (KEN)	Nastassia Ivanova (BLR)
22 April 2018	Gold	Marathon	Virgin Money London Marathon	London	United Kingdom	Eliud Kipchoge (KEN)	Vivian Jepkemei Cheruiyot (KEN)
5 May 2018	Gold	Marathon	Yellow River Estuary International Marathon	Dongying	China	Joel Kemboi Kimurer (KEN)	Letebrhan Haylay Gebreslasea (ETH)
6 May 2018	Bronze	Marathon	Harmony Geneva Marathon for Unicef	Geneva	Switzerland	William Yegon (KEN)	Amelework Fekadu (ETH)
6 May 2018	Gold	Marathon	Volkswagen Prague Marathon	Prague	Czech Republic	Galen Rupp (USA)	Bornes Chepkirui (KEN)
12 May 2018	Silver	10K run	Okpekpe Intn'l 10km Road Race	Okpekpe	Nigeria	Alex Kibet (KEN)	Dera Dida (ETH)
13 May 2018	Bronze	Marathon	Dalian International Marathon	Dalian	China	Edwin Koech (KEN)	Mulu Seboka (ETH)
19 May 2018	Gold	Half marathon	Mattoni Karlovy Vary Half Marathon	Karlovy Vary	Czech Republic	Roman Romanenko (UKR)	Eva Vrabcová-Nývltová (CZE)
20 May 2018	Bronze	Marathon	Lattelecom Riga Marathon	Riga	Latvia	Tsedat Abeje Ayana (ETH)	Georgina Rono (KEN)
26 May 2018	Gold	10K run	Ottawa 10K	Ottawa	Canada	Andamlak Belihu (ETH)	Alia Saeed Mohammed (UAE)
27 May 2018	Gold	Marathon	Scotiabank Ottawa Marathon	Ottawa	Canada	Yemane Tsegay (ETH)	Gelete Burka (ETH)
27 May 2018	Gold	10K run	Tata Consultancy Services World 10K Bangalore	Bangalore	India	Geoffrey Kamworor (KEN)	Agnes Jebet Tirop (KEN)
2 June 2018	Gold	Half marathon	Mattoni České Budějovice Half Marathon	České Budějovice	Czech Republic	Luke Traynor (GBR)	Lilia Fisikovici (MDA)
10 June 2018	Gold	Marathon	Lanzhou International Marathon	Lanzhou	China	Kelkile Gezahegn (ETH)	Merima Mohammed (BHR)
16 June 2018	Bronze	10K run	Corrida de Langueux	Langueux	France	Moses Kibet (KEN)	Clémence Calvin (FRA)
23 June 2018	Bronze	10K run	Vidovdan Road Race	Brčko	Bosnia and Herzegovina	Moses Kibet (KEN)	Katsiaryna Karneyenka (BLR)
23 June 2018	Gold	Half marathon	Mattoni Olomouc Half Marathon	Olomouc	Czech Republic	Stephen Kiprop (KEN)	Netsanet Gudeta (ETH)
1 July 2018	Gold	Marathon	Gold Coast Airport Marathon	Gold Coast	Australia	Kenneth Mburu Mungara (KEN)	Ruth Chebitok (KEN)
29 July 2018	Gold	Half marathon	Media Maratón de Bogotá	Bogotá	Colombia	Betesfa Getahun (ETH)	Netsanet Gudeta (ETH)
26 August 2018	Silver	Marathon	Maratón TELCEL Ciudad de México	Mexico City	Mexico	Titus Ekiru (KEN)	Etaferahu Wodaj (ETH)
8 September 2018	Gold	10K run	Birell Prague Grand Prix	Prague	Czech Republic	Rhonex Kipruto (KEN)	Caroline Chepkoech Kipkirui (KEN)
8 September 2018	Silver	Marathon	Taiyuan International Marathon	Taiyuan	China	Ezekiel Kemboi Omullo (KEN)	Alice Jepkemboi Kimutai (KEN)
9 September 2018	Bronze	Half marathon	Minsk Half Marathon	Minsk	Belarus	Abebe Negewo (ETH)	Sheila Jerotich (KEN)
15 September 2018	Gold	Half marathon	Mattoni Usti nad Labem Half Marathon	Ústí nad Labem	Czech Republic	Stephen Kiprop (KEN)	Diana Chemtai Kipyokei (KEN)
16 September 2018	Gold	Marathon	BMW Berlin-Marathon	Berlin	Germany	Eliud Kipchoge (KEN)	Gladys Cherono (KEN)
16 September 2018	Gold	Half marathon	Copenhagen Half Marathon	Copenhagen	Denmark	Daniel Kipchumba (KEN)	Sifan Hassan (NED)
16 September 2018	Gold	Marathon	CFLD Beijing Marathon	Beijing	China	Dejene Debela (ETH)	Valary Jemeli (KEN)
16 September 2018	Gold	Marathon	Blackmores Sydney Marathon	Sydney	Australia	Elija Kemboi (KEN)	Mercy Kibarus (KEN)
23 September 2018	Gold	Marathon	Sanlam Cape Town Marathon	Cape Town	South Africa	Stephen Mokoka (RSA)	Helalia Johannes (NAM)
23 September 2018	Silver	10 miles	Dam Tot Damloop	Amsterdam	Netherlands	Joshua Cheptegei (UGA)	Lonah Chemtai Salpeter (ISR)
23 September 2018	Bronze	Marathon	Maratón de Buenos Aires Ñandú	Buenos Aires	Argentina	Emmanuel Saina (KEN)	Vivian Kiplagat (KEN)
29 September 2018	Silver	Marathon	Hengshui Lake International Marathon	Hengshui	China	Lemi Berhanu (ETH)	Waganesh Mekasha (ETH)
30 September 2018	Bronze	Marathon	PZU Maraton Warszawski	Warsaw	Poland	David Kiprono (KEN)	Beatrice Jelangat Cherop (KEN)
7 October 2018	Silver	Half marathon	Cardiff University / Cardiff Half Marathon	Cardiff	United Kingdom	Jack Rayner (AUS)	Juliet Chekwel (UGA)
7 October 2018	Silver	Marathon	Košice Peace Marathon	Košice	Slovakia	Raymond Kipchumba Choge (KEN)	Milliam Ebongon (KEN)
7 October 2018	Gold	Marathon	Bank of America Chicago Marathon	Chicago	United States	Mo Farah (GBR)	Brigid Kosgei (KEN)
14 October 2018	Bronze	Marathon	Raiffeisen Bank Bucharest Marathon	Bucharest	Romania	Hosea Kipkemboi (KEN)	Almaz Gelana (ETH)
14 October 2018	Bronze	Marathon	PKO Poznań Marathon	Poznań	Poland	Cosmas Kyeva (KEN)	Tesfanesh Merga (ETH)
14 October 2018	Silver	20K run	Les 20 Km de Paris	Paris	France	Samuel Tsegay Tesfamariam (ERI)	Ophélie Claude-Boxberger (FRA)
14 October 2018	Silver	Marathon	EDP Maratona de Lisboa	Lisbon	Portugal	Limenih Getachew (ETH)	Kuftu Tahir (ETH)
14 October 2018	Gold	Half marathon	Meia Maratona de Portugal	Lisbon	Portugal	Mustapha El Aziz (MAR)	Yebrgual Melese (ETH)
21 October 2018	Gold	Marathon	Scotiabank Toronto Waterfront Marathon	Toronto	Canada	Benson Kipruto (KEN)	Mimi Belete (BHR)
21 October 2018	Gold	Marathon	TCS Amsterdam Marathon	Amsterdam	Netherlands	Lawrence Cherono (KEN)	Tadelech Bekele (ETH)
21 October 2018	Gold	Half marathon	Airtel Delhi Half Marathon	New Delhi	India	Andamlak Belihu (ETH)	Tsehay Gemechu (ETH)
28 October 2018	Gold	Marathon	Mainova Frankfurt Marathon	Frankfurt	Germany	[[]] (25x17px)	[[]] (25x17px)
28 October 2018	Silver	20K run	Marseille-Cassis 20Km	Marseille	France	[[]] (25x17px)	[[]] (25x17px)
28 October 2018	Silver	Marathon	Volkswagen Ljubljana Marathon	Ljubljana	Slovenia	[[]] (25x17px)	[[]] (25x17px)
28 October 2018	Gold	Half marathon	Medio Maratón Valencia Trinidad Alfonso EDP	Valencia	Spain	[[]] (25x17px)	[[]] (25x17px)
28 October 2018	Bronze	Marathon	Huawei Venice Marathon	Venice	Italy	[[]] (25x17px)	[[]] (25x17px)
4 November 2018	Gold	Marathon	TCS New York City Marathon	New York City	United States	Lelisa Desisa (ETH)	Mary Jepkosgei Keitany (KEN)
4 November 2018	Silver	Marathon	Hangzhou Marathon	Hangzhou	China	[[]] (25x17px)	[[]] (25x17px)
4 November 2018	Bronze	Marathon	Maratona do Porto EDP	Porto	Portugal	[[]] (25x17px)	[[]] (25x17px)
4 November 2018	Bronze	Marathon	Marathon des Alpes-Maritimes Nice-Cannes	Nice	France	[[]] (25x17px)	[[]] (25x17px)
11 November 2018	Bronze	Marathon	Maratón Internacional Megacable Guadalajara	Guadalajara	Mexico	[[]] (25x17px)	[[]] (25x17px)
11 November 2018	Silver	Marathon	BLOM BANK Beirut Marathon	Beirut	Lebanon	[[]] (25x17px)	[[]] (25x17px)
11 November 2018	Gold	Marathon	Vodafone Istanbul Marathon	Istanbul	Turkey	[[]] (25x17px)	[[]] (25x17px)
11 November 2018	Bronze	Marathon	Hefei International Marathon	Hefei	China	[[]] (25x17px)	[[]] (25x17px)
18 November 2018	Bronze	Marathon	Kobe Marathon	Kobe	Japan	[[]] (25x17px)	[[]] (25x17px)
18 November 2018	Gold	Marathon	Shanghai International Marathon	Shanghai	China	[[]] (25x17px)	[[]] (25x17px)
18 November 2018	Bronze	Half marathon	Semi-Marathon de Boulogne Billancourt Christian Granger	Boulogne-Billancourt	France	[[]] (25x17px)	[[]] (25x17px)
25 November 2018	Bronze	Marathon	Asics Firenze Marathon	Florence	Italy	[[]] (25x17px)	[[]] (25x17px)
2 December 2018	Gold	Marathon	The 72nd Fukuoka International Open Marathon Championships	Fukuoka	Japan	[[]] (25x17px)	[[]] (25x17px)
2 December 2018	Gold	Marathon	Maratón Valencia Trinidad Alfonso EDP	Valencia	Spain	[[]] (25x17px)	[[]] (25x17px)
2 December 2018	Bronze	10K run	10K Valencia Trinidad Alfonso	Valencia	Spain	[[]] (25x17px)	[[]] (25x17px)
2 December 2018	Bronze	Marathon	Marathon du Gabon Olam	Libreville	Gabon	[[]] (25x17px)	[[]] (25x17px)
9 December 2018	Silver	Marathon	Saitama International Marathon	Saitama	Japan	[[]] (25x17px)	[[]] (25x17px)
9 December 2018	Gold	Marathon	Guangzhou Marathon	Guangzhou	China	[[]] (25x17px)	[[]] (25x17px)
9 December 2018	Gold	Marathon	Standard Chartered Singapore Marathon	Singapore	Singapore	[[]] (25x17px)	[[]] (25x17px)
16 December 2018	Silver	Marathon	Shenzhen Marathon	Shenzhen	China	[[]] (25x17px)	[[]] (25x17px)
16 December 2018	Bronze	Marathon	Mersin Marathon	Mersin	Turkey	[[]] (25x17px)	[[]] (25x17px)
16 December 2018	Bronze	25K run	Tata Steel Kolkata 25K	Kolkata	India	[[]] (25x17px)	[[]] (25x17px)
16 December 2018	Bronze	Half marathon	Bangsaen21 Half Marathon	Chonburi	Thailand	[[]] (25x17px)	[[]] (25x17px)
30 December 2018	Silver	10K run	Corrida Internationale de Houilles	Houilles	France	[[]] (25x17px)	[[]] (25x17px)
31 December 2018	Silver	10K run	Nationale-Nederlanden San Silvestre Vallecana	Madrid	Spain	[[]] (25x17px)	[[]] (25x17px)
