= Lilia Fisikovici =

Moldovan long-distance runner

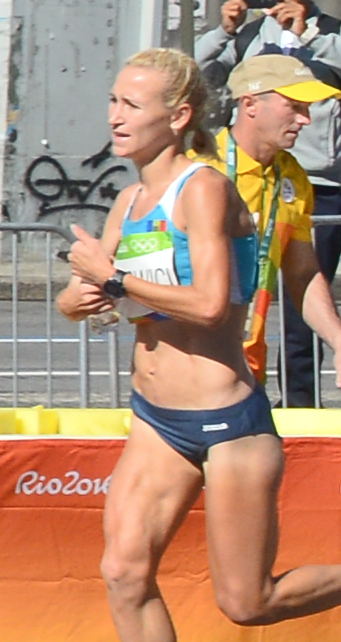
- Lilia Fisikowici at the 2016 Summer Olympics

Personal information
- Born: 29 March 1989 (age 37)

Sport
- Sport: Track and field
- Event: Marathon

Lilia Fisikovici (born 29 March 1989) is a Moldovan long-distance runner who specialises in the half marathon and the marathon, and is currently the holder of the Moldovan national record for both events. She competed in the women's marathon event at the 2016 Summer Olympics. She qualified to represent Moldova again at the 2020 Summer Olympics.

In 2018, at the Ljubljana Marathon held in the capital of Slovenia, she set a new Moldovan marathon record with a time of 2:28:26, a time she cut by exactly a minute the next year to 2:27.26 in the 2019 London Marathon. In 2020, she competed in the women's half marathon at the 2020 World Athletics Half Marathon Championships held in Gdynia, Poland, finishing in 1 hour, 13 minutes and 32 seconds. She has won the Cracovia Marathon in Kraków Poland in 2018 and 2022. Over the years Fisikovici's greatest success as an elite athlete seems to have come mainly in the half marathon distance.

== Selected Half Marathon & Marathon Performances ==
Representing Moldova
Year	Half Marathon Road Races	Place	Finishing time
2009	Bratislava Half Marathon (Slovakia)	2nd place, silver medalist(s)	1:18.44
2016	Sopot Half Marathon (Poland)	3rd place, bronze medalist(s)	1:16.20
2016	Cracovia Royal Half-Marathon (Poland)	1st place, gold medalist(s)	1:13.02
2016	Kyiv Half Marathon (Ukraine)	3rd place, bronze medalist(s)	1:16.26
2016	Krynica-Zdroj Half Marathon (Poland)	1st place, gold medalist(s)	1:16.16
2018	České Budějovice Half Marathon (Czech Republic)	1st place, gold medalist(s)	1:13.20
2018	Ústí nad Labem Half Marathon (Czech Republic)	6th	1:10.45 NR
2018	IAAF World Half Marathon Championships (Spain)	36th	1:12.11
2019	Olomouc Half Marathon (Czech Republic)	1st place, gold medalist(s)	1:13.32
2019	Istanbul Half Marathon (Turkey)	10th	1:13.54
2019	České Budějovice Half Marathon (Czech Republic)	1st place, gold medalist(s)	1:13.29
2019	Karlovy Vary Half Marathon (Czech Republic)	1st place, gold medalist(s)	1:12.34
2020	World Athletics Half Marathon Championships (Poland)	67th	1:13.32
2021	Cracovia Royal Half-Marathon (Poland)	4th	1:14.48
2022	Białystok Half Marathon (Poland)	1st place, gold medalist(s)	1:13.58
Year	Marathons	Place	Finishing time
2015	Marathon de Łódź (Poland)	7th	2:48.23
2015	Warsaw Marathon (Poland)	2nd place, silver medalist(s)	2:35.12
2016	Rio de Janeiro - Olympic Games (Brazil)	27th	2:34.05
2018	Cracovia Marathon (Poland)	1st place, gold medalist(s)	2:31.27
2018	Ljubljana Marathon (Slovenia)	6th	2:28.26
2018	Singapore Marathon (Singapore)	6th	2:41.51
2019	London Marathon (United Kingdom)	14th	2:27.26 NR
2019	Cool City Liupanshui Marathon (PRC)	4th	2:54.28
2021	Sapporo - Olympic Games (Japan)	54th	2:39.59
2021	Taipei Marathon (Taiwan)	3rd place, bronze medalist(s)	2:32.48
2022	Cracovia Marathon (Poland)	1st place, gold medalist(s)	2:40.35
2023	Paris Marathon (France)	12th	2:34.44
2023	Malaga Marathon (Spain)	2nd place, silver medalist(s)	2:34.12
2024	Vienna City Marathon (Austria)	5th	2:30.06
