= List of Moldovan records in athletics =

The following are the national records in athletics in Moldova maintained by its national athletics federation: Federatia de Atletism din Republica Moldova (FAM).

== Outdoor ==
Key to tables: Awaiting ratification Record not kept by FAM Not ratified or later rescinded by FAM

=== Men ===
| Event | Record | Athlete | Date | Meet | Place | Ref. |
|---|---|---|---|---|---|---|
| 100 m | 10.30 (+0.4 m/s) | Aleksandr Afteni | 19 July 1984 | | Moscow, Soviet Union | |
| 200 m | 21.15 NWI | Yuriy Yordanov | 16 September 1984 | | Baku, Soviet Union | |
| 400 m | 46.57 | Sergey Grigoryev | 5 July 1984 | | Kyiv, Soviet Union | |
| 800 m | 1:47.18 | Vitaliy Cherkes | 19 August 2000 | | Staiki, Belarus | |
| 1500 m | 3:37.2 h | Anatoliy Mamontov | 22 July 1976 | | Podolsk, Soviet Union | |
| 3000 m | 7:52.5 h | Anatoliy Mamontov | 28 April 1980 | | Sochi, Soviet Union | |
| 5000 m | 13:47.6 h | Igor Braslavskiy | 25 August 1983 | | Chişinău, Soviet Union | |
| 10,000 m | 28:16.06 (Note: by FAM source and World Athletics Profile; 28:16.4h by World Athletics Statistic Handbook) | Vasiliy Nikolayev | 18 July 1978 | | Vilnius, Soviet Union | |
| 10 km (road) | 29:11 | Maxim Răileanu | 26 March 2023 | | Korschenbroich, Germany | |
| 10 km (road) | 28:54.1 | Vasiliy Nikolayev | 26 September 2009 | | Carouge, Switzerland | |
| 15 km (road) | 45:58 | Vasiliy Nikolayev | 10 October 2004 | | Istanbul, Turkey | |
| Half marathon | 1:02:43 | Jaroslav Mushinschi | 18 February 2007 | | Trabzon, Turkey | |
| Marathon | 2:08:32 | Jaroslav Mushinschi | 2 May 2010 | Düsseldorf Marathon | Düsseldorf, Germany | |
| 6-hour run (road) | 84.277 km | Vitalie Gheorghiță | 22 May 2021 | | Chişinău, Moldova | |
| 12-hour run (road) | 148.329 km | Piotr Cociuc | 23 May 2021 | | Chişinău, Moldova | |
| 24-hour run (road) | 258.192 km | Vadim Balan | 4 June 2023 | | Chişinău, Moldova | |
| 110 m hurdles | 13.58 (+0.2 m/s) | Aleksandr Yenko | 6 July 1995 | | Gomel, Belarus | |
| 400 m hurdles | 48.61 | Vadim Zadoynov | 29 August 1990 | European Championships | Split, Yugoslavia | |
| 3000 m steeplechase | 8:18.97 | Ion Luchianov | 16 August 2008 | Olympic Games | Beijing, China | |
| High jump | 2.25 m | Radu Tucan | 30 May 2008 | | Chişinău, Moldova | |
| High jump | 2.25 m | Andrei Mîţîcov | 28 May 2016 | | Tiraspol, Moldova | |
| Pole vault | 5.70 m | Aleksandr Zhukov | 20 June 1987 | | Chelyabinsk, Soviet Union | |
| Long jump | 8.25 m (+1.6 m/s) | Sergey Podgayniy | 18 August 1990 | | Chişinău, Soviet Union | |
| Triple jump | 17.06 m (±0.0 m/s) | Vladimir Letnicov | 23 June 2002 | | Belgrade, FR Yugoslavia | |
| Shot put | 20.64 m | Ivan Emelianov | 29 May 2011 | | Chişinău, Moldova | |
| Shot put | 20.80 m (Note: questionable; ratified by FAM but not recognized by World Athletics) | Ivan Emelianov | 14 May 2016 | | Onești, Romania | |
| Discus throw | 65.46 m | Georgiy Zelentsov | 19 October 1980 | | Yerevan, Soviet Union | |
| Hammer throw | 78.72 m (1st throw) | Sergiu Marghiev | 30 May 2015 | Moldovan Championships | Chişinău, Moldova | |
| Hammer throw | 78.72 m (4th throw) | Sergiu Marghiev | 30 May 2015 | Moldovan Championships | Chişinău, Moldova | |
| Javelin throw | 86.66 m | Andrian Mardare | 9 May 2021 | European Throwing Cup | Split, Croatia | |
| Decathlon | 8288 pts | Valeriy Kachanov | 20–21 June 1980 | | Moscow, Soviet Union | |
| Decathlon | 100m (wind) / Long jump (wind) / Shot put / High jump / 400m / 110m H (wind) / Discus / Pole vault / Javelin / 1500m; 11.08 / 7.54 m / 14.53 m / 2.08 m / 48.70 / 14.61 / 46.10 m / 4.50 m / 58.10 m / 4:17.4 | | | | | |
| 20 km walk (road) | 1:19:32 | Victor Mostovik | 3 May 1987 | | New York, United States | |
| 35 km walk (road) | 3:00:45+ | Feodosii Chumachenko | 26 March 2011 | | Dudince, Slovakia | |
| 50 km walk (road) | 4:01:38 | Feodosii Chumachenko | 24 September 1999 | | Kyiv, Ukraine | |
| 4 × 100 m relay | 40.70 | Moldavian SSR; Soin; Alexandru Gancenco; Yuriy Yordanov; Aleksandr Afteni | 29 July 1979 | | Moscow, Soviet Union | |
| 4 × 200 m relay | 1:25.6 h | Grigoriev; Russu; Afteni; Inculets | | | | |
| Swedish relay | 1:53.63 | Alexei Morozov; Andrei Daranuța; Alexandru Zatic; Andrei Șturmilov | 9 June 2018 | | Schaan, Liechtenstein | |
| 4 × 400 m relay | 3:07.65 | Moldavian SSR; A. Bazarov; Y. Shipulin; S. Lachiza; Sergey Grigoryev | 16 August 1988 | | Kyiv, Soviet Union | |
| 4 × 800 m relay | 7:21.8 h | Gavazdin; Chereshnev; Paderin; Lysenko | 1979 | | Chişinău, Moldova | |
| 4 × 1500 m relay | 16:29.9 h | Karimov; Paderin; Oprea; Primak | | | | |

=== Women ===
| Event | Record | Athlete | Date | Meet | Place | Ref. |
|---|---|---|---|---|---|---|
| 100 m | 11.58 (+2.0 m/s) | Irina Grigoryeva | 28 June 1985 | | Tallinn, Soviet Union | |
| 200 m | 23.54 (+1.8 m/s) | Jana Burtasenkova | 13 June 1993 | | Rotterdam, Netherlands | |
| 400 m | 52.00 | Olesea Cojuhari | 15 June 2012 | Grand Prix | Bucharest, Romania | |
| 800 m | 1:59.3 h | Lyubov Ivanova | 12 August 1978 | | Podolsk, Soviet Union | |
| 1500 m | 3:57.05 | Svetlana Guskova | 27 July 1982 | | Kyiv, Soviet Union | |
| 3000 m | 8:29.36 | Svetlana Guskova | 25 July 1982 | | Kyiv, Soviet Union | |
| 5000 m | 15:02.12 | Svetlana Guskova | 21 June 1986 | | Tallinn, Soviet Union | |
| 5 km (road) | 16:09 | Tatyana Zuyeva | 6 February 1993 | | Gainesville, United States | |
| 10,000 m | 31:42.43 | Svetlana Guskova | 30 August 1986 | | Stuttgart, West Germany | |
| 10 km (road) | 33:21 | Tatyana Zuyeva | 5 March 1994 | | Plant City, United States | |
| 15 km (road) | 50:09+ | Lilia Fisikovici | 15 September 2018 | Ústí nad Labem Half Marathon | Ústí nad Labem, Czech Republic | |
| 20 km (road) | 1:08:37+ | Lilia Fisikovici | 24 March 2018 | World Half Marathon Championships | Valencia, Spain | |
| Half marathon | 1:10:45 | Lilia Fisikovici | 15 September 2018 | Ústí nad Labem Half Marathon | Ústí nad Labem, Czech Republic | |
| 25 km (road) | 1:26:22+ | Lilia Fisikovici | 28 April 2019 | London Marathon | London, United Kingdom | |
| 30 km (road) | 1:44:03+ | Lilia Fisikovici | 28 April 2019 | London Marathon | London, United Kingdom | |
| Marathon | 2:27:26 | Lilia Fisikovici | 28 April 2019 | London Marathon | London, United Kingdom | |
| 6-hour run (road) | 68.635 km | Natalia Zbirnea | 3 June 2023 | | Chişinău, Moldova | |
| 12-hour run (road) | 108.145 km | Eugenia Baltag | 23 May 2021 | | Chişinău, Moldova | |
| 24-hour run (road) | 178.063 km | Elena Iabanji | 3 June 2018 | | Chişinău, Moldova | |
| 100 m hurdles | 12.81 (+1.0 m/s) | Maria Kemenchezhi | 26 June 1982 | | Cottbus, East Germany | |
| 400 m hurdles | 56.11 | Natalia Dudina | 5 July 1988 | | Tallinn, Soviet Union | |
| 3000 m steeplechase | 9:36.63 | Oxana Juravel | 15 August 2009 | World Championships | Berlin, Germany | |
| 3000 m steeplechase | 9:34.40 | Andreea Stavila-Grosu | 10 August 2026 | European Championships | Birmingham, United Kingdom | |
| High jump | 1.97 m | Olga Bolşova | 5 September 1993 | Rieti IAAF Grand Prix | Rieti, Italy | |
| Pole vault | 4.15 m | Angelina Zhuk-Krasnova | 26 June 2022 | Qosanov Memorial | Almaty, Kazakhstan | |
| Long jump | 6.53 m NWI | Lyubov Ratsu | 28 August 1983 | | Chişinău, Soviet Union | |
| Triple jump | 14.24 m (+0.6 m/s) | Olga Bolşova | 28 June 2003 | | Alcalá, Spain | |
| Shot put | 19.85 m (Note: ratified by FAM but not recognized by World Athletics) | Alexandra Mititelu | 28 June 1984 | | Tallinn, Soviet Union | |
| Shot put | 19.59 m (Note: recognized by World Athletics) | Alexandra Mititelu | 21 September 1985 | | Baku, Soviet Union | |
| Discus throw | 64.42 m | Alexandra Emilianov | 13 April 2024 | Oklahoma Throws Series World Invitational | Ramona, United States | |
| Hammer throw | 75.95 m | Zalina Marghieva | 11 May 2024 | Throwing meeting " Dionisopolis" | Balchik, Bulgaria | |
| Javelin throw | 54.37 m | Mihaela Tacu | 21 June 2014 | | Tbilisi, Georgia | |
| Heptathlon | 6423 pts h | Lyubov Ratsu | 27–28 August 1983 | | Chişinău, Soviet Union | |
| Heptathlon | 100m H (wind) / High jump / Shot put / 200m (wind) / Long jump (wind) / Javelin / 800m; 13.6 / 1.80 m / 14.75 m / 24.2 / 6.53 m / 41.86 m / 2:11.6 | | | | | |
| 10 km walk (road) | 46:14 | Yulia Lisnik | 11 July 1991 | | Kyiv, Soviet Union | |
| 20 km walk (road) | 1:41:30 | Yulia Lisnik | 16 September 1991 | | Navapolatsk, Belarus | |
| 4 × 100 m relay | 45.2 h | Moldavian SSR; I. Grigoryeva; Natalia Dudina; E. Savtchouk; Larisa Glavenko | 25 August 1985 | | Tiraspol, Soviet Union | |
| 4 × 200 m relay | 1:41.68 (Note: 3:41.68 by FAM source; obviously a typo) | Vavilova; Slisarchiuk; Upir; Tarapaka | | | | |
| Swedish relay | 2:12.92 | Natalia Zdesenco; Ludmila Frunze; Alina Cravcenco; Anna Berghii | 11 June 2016 | | Marsa, Malta | |
| 4 × 400 m relay | 3:35.9 h | Moldavian SSR; T. Ivanova; Natalia Dudina; A. Bologan; Larisa Glavenko | 31 May 1987 | | Tbilisi, Soviet Union | |

=== Mixed ===
| Event | Record | Athlete | Date | Meet | Place | Ref. |
|---|---|---|---|---|---|---|
| 4 × 400 m relay | 3:29.66 | Moldova; Ivan Galușco; Anna Berghii; Cristin Eșanu; Tatiana Contrebuț | 22 June 2023 | European Team Championships | Chorzów, Poland | |

== Indoor ==
=== Men ===
| Event | Record | Athlete | Date | Meet | Place | Ref. |
|---|---|---|---|---|---|---|
| 60 m | 6.77 | Aleksandr Afteni | 18 February 1983 | | Moscow, Soviet Union | |
| 60 m | 6.4 h | Aleksandr Afteni | 2 February 1985 | | Chişinău, Soviet Union | |
| 200 m | 21.98 | Yuriy Yordanov | 12 March 1985 | | Chişinău, Soviet Union | |
| 400 m | 47.09 | Vadim Zadoynov | 10 March 1996 | European Championships | Stockholm, Sweden | |
| 800 m | 1:49.6 h | Anatoliy Mamontov | 10 February 1974 | | Moscow, Soviet Union | |
| 800 m | 1:49.75 | Ion Siuris | 27 February 2016 | | Istanbul, Turkey | |
| 1000 m | 2:25.3 h | Anatoliy Mamontov | 2 March 1973 | | Moscow, Soviet Union | |
| 1500 m | 3:41.1 h | Anatoliy Mamontov | 12 March 1978 | European Championships | Milan, Italy | |
| 3000 m | 8:03.6 h | Anatoliy Mamontov | 13 March 1978 | | Moscow, Soviet Union | |
| 60 m hurdles | 7.84 | Aleksandr Yenko | 4 February 1995 | | Sofia, Bulgaria | |
| High jump | 2.22 m | Andrei Miticov | 8 February 2015 | | Chișinău, Moldova | |
| High jump | 2.22 m | Andrei Miticov | 21 February 2015 | Balkan Championships | Istanbul, Turkey | |
| Pole vault | 5.75 m (Note: doubtful; ratified by FAM but not recognized by World Athletics) | Aleksandr Zhukov | 20 May 1991 (Note: 25 May 1991 by other sources) | | Tbilisi, Soviet Union | |
| Pole vault | 5.70 m (Note: recognized by World Athletics, outdoor mark ratified as absolute record) | Aleksandr Zhukov | 17 January 1988 | | Minsk, Soviet Union | |
| Pole vault | 5.70 m | Aleksandr Zhukov | 3 February 1991 | | Chișinău, Soviet Union | |
| Long jump | 8.09 m | Alexandru Cuharenco | 3 February 2012 | Moldovan Championships | Chișinău, Moldova | |
| Triple jump | 16.85 m | Vladimir Letnicov | 1 February 2008 | | Chişinău, Moldova | |
| Shot put | 20.62 m | Ivan Emilianov | 6 February 2016 | Moldovan Winter Throwing Championships | Chişinău, Moldova | |
| Heptathlon | 5145 pts | Victor Covalenco | 13–14 February 2007 | | Sumy, Ukraine | |
| Heptathlon | 60m / Long jump / Shot put / High jump / 60m H / Pole vault / 1000m; 7.34 / 6.91 m / 13.89 m / 1.88 m / 9.29 / 4.20 m / 2:45.47 | | | | | |
| Heptathlon | 5175 pts h | Victor Covalenco | 8–9 February 2002 | | Chişinău, Moldova | |
| Heptathlon | 60m / Long jump / Shot put / High jump / 60m H / Pole vault / 1000m; 7.2 / 6.88 m / 13.24 m / 1.88 m / 8.7 / 4.20 m / 2:42.2 | | | | | |
| 5000 m walk | 19:59.87 | Viacheslav Fediuc | 12 February 1994 | | Paris, France | |
| 5000 m walk | 19:19.69 (Note: not ratified by FAM but recognized by World Athletics) | Viacheslav Fediuc | 13 February 1994 | | Kyiv, Ukraine | |
| 4 × 400 m relay | 3:17.64 | Andrei Șturmilov; Siuris; Babian; Andrei Daranuța | 27 February 2016 | Balkan Championships | Istanbul, Turkey | |

=== Women ===
| Event | Record | Athlete | Date | Meet | Place | Ref. |
|---|---|---|---|---|---|---|
| 60 m | 7.42 | Lilia Mocanu | 6 February 1990 | | Chelyabinsk, Soviet Union | |
| 60 m | 7.0 h (Note: not ratified by FAM but recognized by World Athletics) | Lilia Mocanu | 26 January 1992 | | Chişinău, Moldova | |
| 200 m | 24.12 | Lilia Mocanu | 15 February 1991 | | Moscow, Soviet Union | |
| 400 m | 53.72 | Larisa Glavenco | 26 February 1990 | | Moscow, Soviet Union | |
| 800 m | 2:04.13 | Olga Politova | 12 January 1984 | | Boston, United States | |
| 1000 m | 2:40.27 | Svetlana Guskova | ? | | ? | |
| 1500 m | 4:07.4 h | Svetlana Guskova | 25 February 1979 | European Championships | Vienna, Austria | |
| 3000 m | 9:00.59 | Svetlana Guskova | 20 February 1982 | | Moscow, Soviet Union | |
| 3000 m | 8:55.30 | Svetlana Guskova | 19 February 1982 | | Moscow, Soviet Union | |
| 60 m hurdles | 7.96 (Note: ratified by FAM but not recognized by World Athletics) | Maria Kemenchezhi-Merchuk | 22 February 1981 | | Grenoble, France | |
| 60 m hurdles | 8.07 (Note: recognized by World Athletics) | Maria Kemenchezhi-Merchuk | 20 February 1982 | | Moscow, Soviet Union | |
| High jump | 1.94 m | Lyudmila Sukhoroslova | 24 January 1988 | | Zaporizhzhya, Soviet Union | |
| High jump | 1.94 m | Olga Bolşova | 20 January 1992 | | Chişinău, Moldova | |
| High jump | 1.94 m | Olga Bolşova | 28 February 1994 | | Piraeus, Greece | |
| High jump | 1.94 m | Olga Bolşova | 10 March 1996 | European Championships | Stockholm, Sweden | |
| Pole vault | 3.60 m | Ecaterina Abramova | 5 February 2012 | Moldovan Championships | Chișinău, Moldova | |
| Pole vault | 3.60 m | Irina Tveordohlebova | 23 February 2013 | | Istanbul, Turkey | |
| Pole vault | 3.60 m (Note: not ratified by FAM but recognized by World Athletics) | Irina Tveordohlebova | 9 January 2016 | | Chişinău, Moldova | |
| Pole vault | 3.60 m (Note: ratified by FAM but not recognized by World Athletics) | Irina Tveordohlebova | 6 February 2016 | | Chişinău, Moldova | |
| Pole vault | 3.60 m | Irina Tveordohlebova | 27 February 2016 | Balkan Championships | Istanbul, Turkey | |
| Long jump | 6.47 m | Lyubov Ratsu | 3 March 1985 | | Gomel, Soviet Union | |
| Triple jump | 14.17 m | Olga Bolşova | 11 March 2001 | World Championships | Lisbon, Portugal | |
| Shot put | 18.52 m | Dimitriana Surdu | 16 February 2019 | Balkan Championships | Istanbul, Turkey | |
| Shot put | 20.06 m | Svetlana Krachevskaya | 22 February 1976 | | Munich, West Germany | |
| Pentathlon | 4714 pts | Lyubov Ratsu | 15 February 1985 | | Moscow, Soviet Union | |
| Pentathlon | 60m H / High jump / Shot put / Long jump / 800m; 8.42 / 1.77 m / 15.12 m / 6.43 m / 2:15.59 | | | | | |
| 3000 m walk | 13:10.43 | Yulia Lisnik | 11 March 1994 | European Championships | Paris, France | |
| 4 × 400 m relay | | | | | | |
