= Zagreb Marathon =

Annual marathon in Zagreb, Croatia

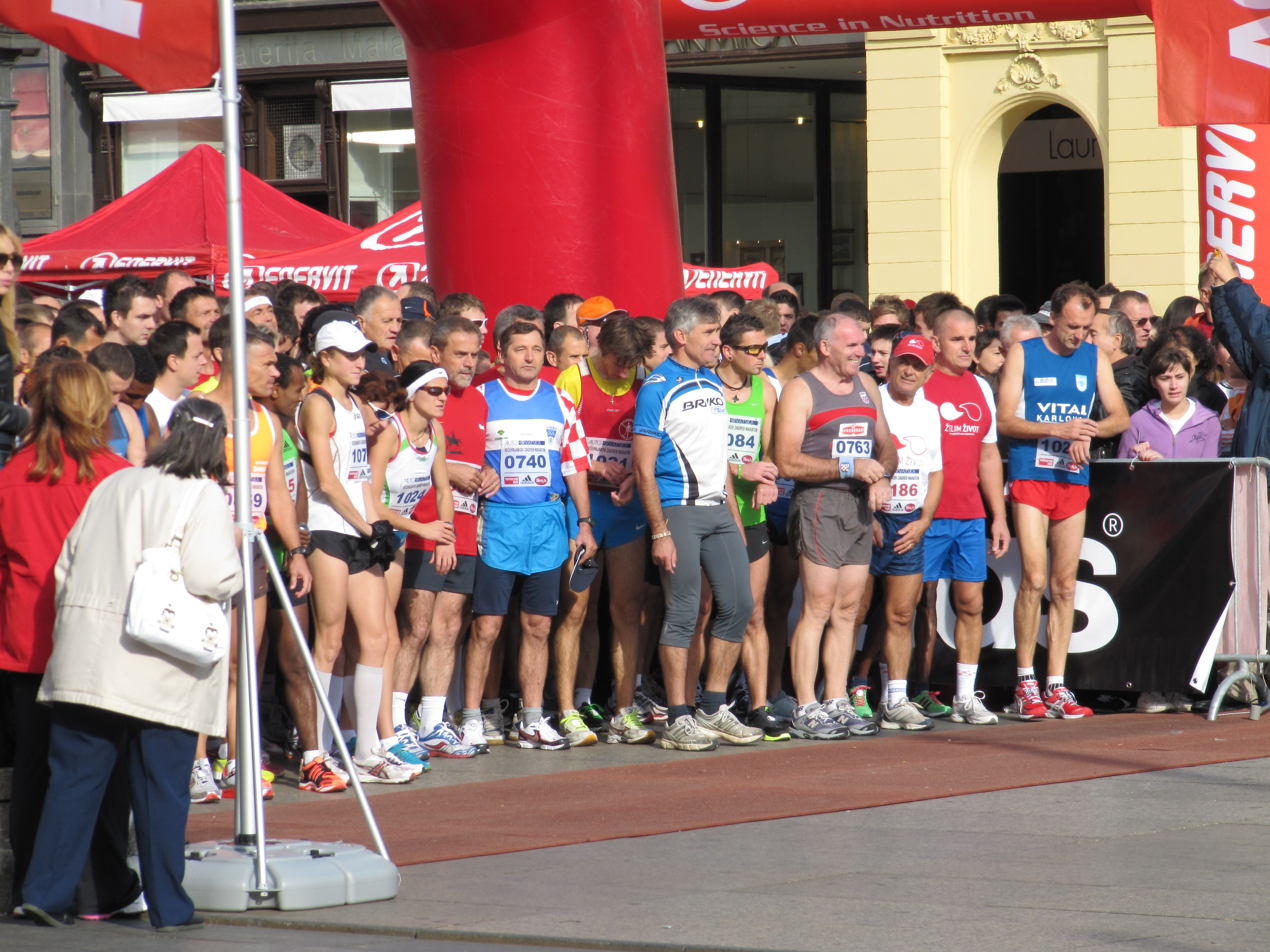
- Start of the 2011 Zagreb Marathon
- Date: October
- Location: Zagreb, Croatia
- Event type: Road
- Distance: Marathon, Half marathon, 10K run Formerly: 5K run
- Established: 1992
- Course records: Men's: 2:09:55 (2017) (Kenya) Wycliffe Biwott; Women's: 2:30:15 (2017) (Kenya) Stella Barsosio
- Website: Zagreb Marathon
- Participants: 622 finishers (2024); 493 (2023); 484 (2022)

The Zagreb Marathon (Croatian: Zagrebački maraton) is an annual marathon held in October in Zagreb, Croatia. It includes a marathon race, half marathon and 10K run. All races begin and end on Ban Jelačić Square.

== History ==
The first marathon race in Zagreb was organized in 1992. The track changed a lot in the first years, until 2004, when the start-finish area was moved to the city center, to the Ban Jelačić Square, with half-turns in Dubrava and Črnomerec, which proved to be one of the key organizational elements of the race. In 2005, the half marathon race was introduced. In 2018, the 10K race was featured for the first time, replacing the 5K race. The 2020 edition of the race was canceled due to the COVID-19 pandemic in Croatia, with registrants also having the option of running the race virtually.

== Marathon winners ==
Key: Course record

Edition	Year	Men's winner	Time (h:m:s)	Women's winner	Time (h:m:s)
23rd	2014	Luke Kibet (KEN)	2:14:11	Olivera Jevtić (SRB)	2:38:26
24th	2015	Gadisa Shumie (ETH)	2:13:10	Stella Barsosio (KEN)	2:38:34
25th	2016	Wycliffe Biwott (KEN)	2:14:17	Stella Barsosio (KEN)	2:33:46
26th	2017	Wycliffe Biwott (KEN)	2:09:55	Stella Barsosio (KEN)	2:30:15
27th	2018	Hosea Tuei (KEN)	2:17:08	Olivera Jevtić (SRB)	2:37:11
28th	2019	Wycliffe Biwott (KEN)	2:19:48	Rebecca Korir (KEN)	2:35:51
*	2020	Tolkyn Nurusheva (KAZ)	3:16:15	Marija Simeonov (CRO)	4:31:11
29th	2021	Ivan Dračar (CRO)	2:24:30	Tea Faber (CRO)	2:51:17
30th	2022	Jean Baptiste Simukeka (RWA)	2:19:07	Viva Kovač (CRO)	2:51:27
31th	2023	Jean Baptiste Simukeka (RWA)	2:29:16	Nataša Šustić (CRO)	2:50:14
31th	2024	Ivan Dračar (CRO)	2:25:40	Tea Faber (CRO)	2:46:10

* The race was held virtually.
