= Orlen Warsaw Marathon =

- Logo of the Orlen Warsaw Marathon
- Date: Mid-April
- Location: Warsaw, Poland
- Event type: Road
- Distance: Marathon, 10K run
- Primary sponsor: Orlen
- Established: 2013 (13 years ago)
- Course records: Men's: 2:06:55 (2014) (Ethiopia) Tadese Tola; Women's: 2:26:06 (2019) (Kenya) Sheila Jerotich
- Website: Orlen Warsaw Marathon
- Participants: 4,662 (2019)

Runners during the race in 2014

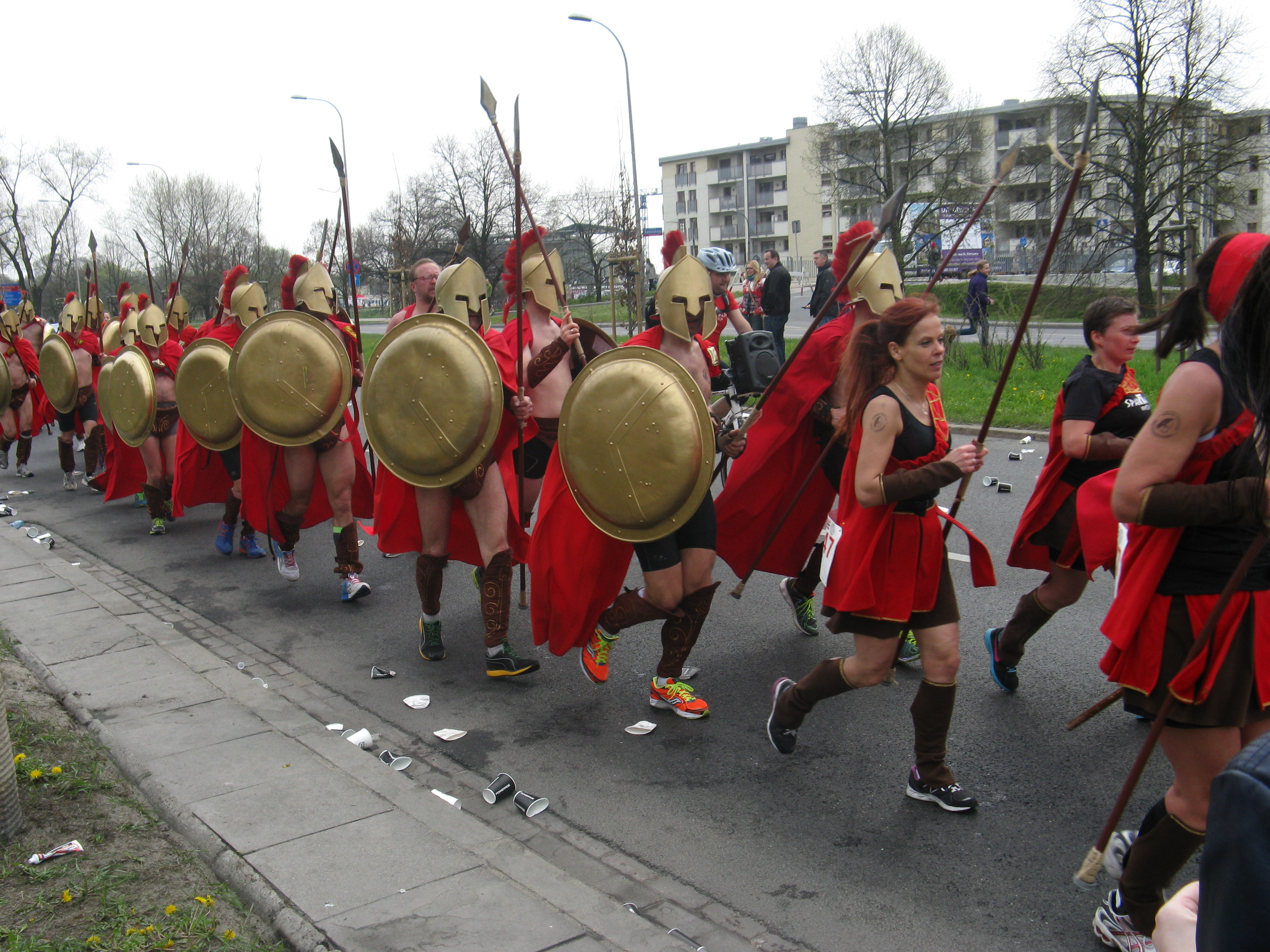
Runners dressed as Ancient Greek warriors

The Orlen Warsaw Marathon is an annual road running event over the marathon distance (42.2 km (26.2 mi)) that takes place in April on the streets of Warsaw, Poland. The event was established in 2013 and has Polish oil company PKN Orlen as its title sponsor. It was the second annual marathon race for the city, following on from the success of the Warsaw Marathon, which has been held in the city, generally in September, since 1979.

By its fourth edition, the event received IAAF Silver Label status and featured in excess of 8000 entrants into the marathon race. That year's race also saw the first Polish winner in the form of men's champion Artur Kozłowski.

The course records of 2:06:55 hours, set by Tadese Tola in 2014, and 2:26:25 hours, set by Fatuma Sado in 2015, are all-comers records – the fastest ever recorded in Poland for the marathon distance.

The marathon was not held in 2020.

== Winners ==
Key:

Course record
National championship race

Ed.	Year	Men's winner	Time	Women's winner	Time	Rf.
1	2013	Sisay Lemma (ETH)	2:09:02	Milka Jerotich (KEN)	2:28:23	
2	2014	Tadese Tola (ETH)	2:06:55	Bizuayehu Ehite (ETH)	2:30:30	
3	2015	Lemi Hayle (ETH)	2:07:57	Fatuma Sado (ETH)	2:26:25	
4	2016	Artur Kozłowski (POL)	2:11:54	Kumesci Sichala (ETH)	2:28:43	
5	2017	Felix Kimutai (KEN)	2:10:34	Nastassia Ivanova (BLR)	2:28:44	
6	2018	Ezekiel Omullo (KEN)	2:11:17	Nastassia Ivanova (BLR)	2:28:03	
7	2019	Regasa Bejiga (ETH)	2:09:42	Sheila Jerotich (KEN)	2:26:06	
	2020	not held				

=== Multiple wins ===
Women's
Athlete	Wins	Years
Nastassia Ivanova (BLR)	2	2017, 2018

=== By country ===
Country	Total	Men's	Women's
Ethiopia	6	3	3
Kenya	4	2	2
Belarus	2	0	2
Poland	1	1	0
Eritrea	1	1	0

== See also ==
- Warsaw Marathon
- Cracovia Marathon
- Poznań Marathon
- Sport in Poland
