= Skopje Marathon =

Annual marathon in North Macedonia

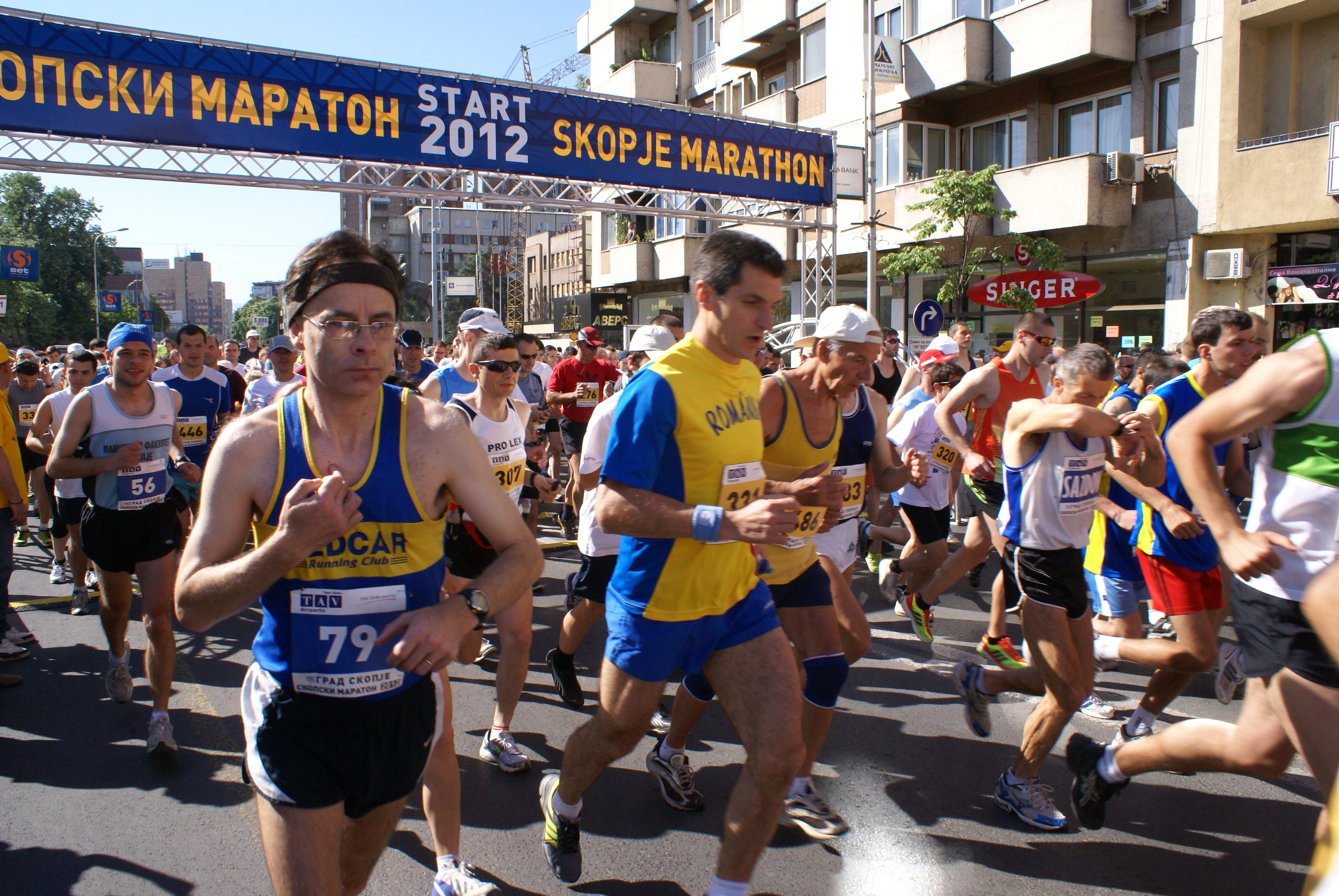
- Start of marathon and half marathon race in 2012
- Date: Early October
- Location: Skopje, North Macedonia
- Event type: Road
- Distance: Marathon, Half marathon, 5K run
- Primary sponsor: Wizz Air
- Established: 2008
- Course records: Men's: 2:12:36 (2016) (Kenya) Kiprotich Kirui; Women's: 2:33:37 (2019) (Kenya) Eunice Muchiri
- Website: Official website
- Participants: 125 (2021); 98 (2020); 256 (2019)

The Skopje Marathon (Macedonian: Скопски маратон) is an annual marathon held in Skopje, North Macedonia. Marathon is held in October from 2020.

== History ==
The first marathon race in Skopje was organized in 1997. It only lasted for that year and the following year before folding, primarily for financial reasons. After a nine-year break, in 2007, the event was partially revived with a half marathon-only race, and then fully restored in 2008, when three races were run: marathon, half marathon, and a 5K humanitarian race. Erwan Fouéré, European Union Special Representative for the country, helped spark the revival.

Since 2009, the race has been a member race of the Association of International Marathons and Distance Races (AIMS).

In 2012, the Skopje Marathon became one of the most significant sporting events in the Republic of Macedonia, as more than 3,600 runners from more than 36 countries attended. That year, the marathon was in the list of Qualifying Marathon Races for the Olympic Games in London.

The 2013 Skopje Marathon featured a full marathon, a half marathon, and a 5K race, and took place on 12 May 2013.

The 2015 edition canceled due to the Kumanovo clashes which happened during the weekend the marathon was supposed to take place.

The 2020 edition of the race was postponed to 2020.10.04 due to the COVID-19 pandemic in North Macedonia, with registrants also having the option of either running the race virtually or transferring their entry to another runner or 2021.

== Past winners ==
Course record

Edition	Year	Men's winner	Nationality	Time (h:m:s)	Women's winner	Nationality	Time (h:m:s)
16th	2024	Hillary Chemweno	Kenya	2:13:28	Irine Jeruto	Kenya	2:37:52
15th	2023	Victor Serem	Kenya	2:15:09	Ruth Matebo	Kenya	2:44:17
14th	2022	Onesmus Kiplimo	Kenya	2:18:12	Catherine Cherotich	Kenya	2:38:41
13th	2021	Dario Ivanovski	North Macedonia	2:21:27	Adrijana Pop Arsova	North Macedonia	2:40:36
12th	2020	Serhiy Shevchenko	Ukraine	2:22:49	Luiza Gega	Albania	2:35:34
11th	2019	Tiruneh Chalachev	Ethiopia	2:15:37	Eunice Muchiri	Kenya	2:33:37
10th	2018	Evans Biwott	Kenya	2:14:08	Jedidah Karungu	Kenya	2:51:24
9th	2017	Kiprotich Kirui	Kenya	2:12:59	Stella Barsosio	Kenya	2:33:42
8th	2016	Kiprotich Kirui	Kenya	2:12:36	Gladys Biwott	Kenya	2:40:10
–	2015	Cancelled due to security concerns.					
7th	2014	Emmanuel Samal	Kenya	2:14:26	Lucy Murigi	Kenya	2:37:47
6th	2013	Wycliffe Biwott	Kenya	2:21:56	Caroline Kipruto	Kenya	2:48:39
5th	2012	Patrick Wambugu	Kenya	2:26:41	Cecilia Wangui	Kenya	2:54:56
4th	2011	Dickson Terer	Kenya	2:23:51	Cecilia Wangui	Kenya	2:50:06
3rd	2010	Tamás Tóth	Hungary	2:28:56	Lucia Kimani	Bosnia and Herzegovina	2:55:56
2nd	2009	Sreten Ninković	Serbia	2:29:07	Marija Vrajić	Croatia	2:56:15
1st	2008	Roman Prodius	Moldova	2:29:26	Lidija Mikloš	Montenegro	3:19:34
