= Stella Barsosio =

Kenyan long-distance runner

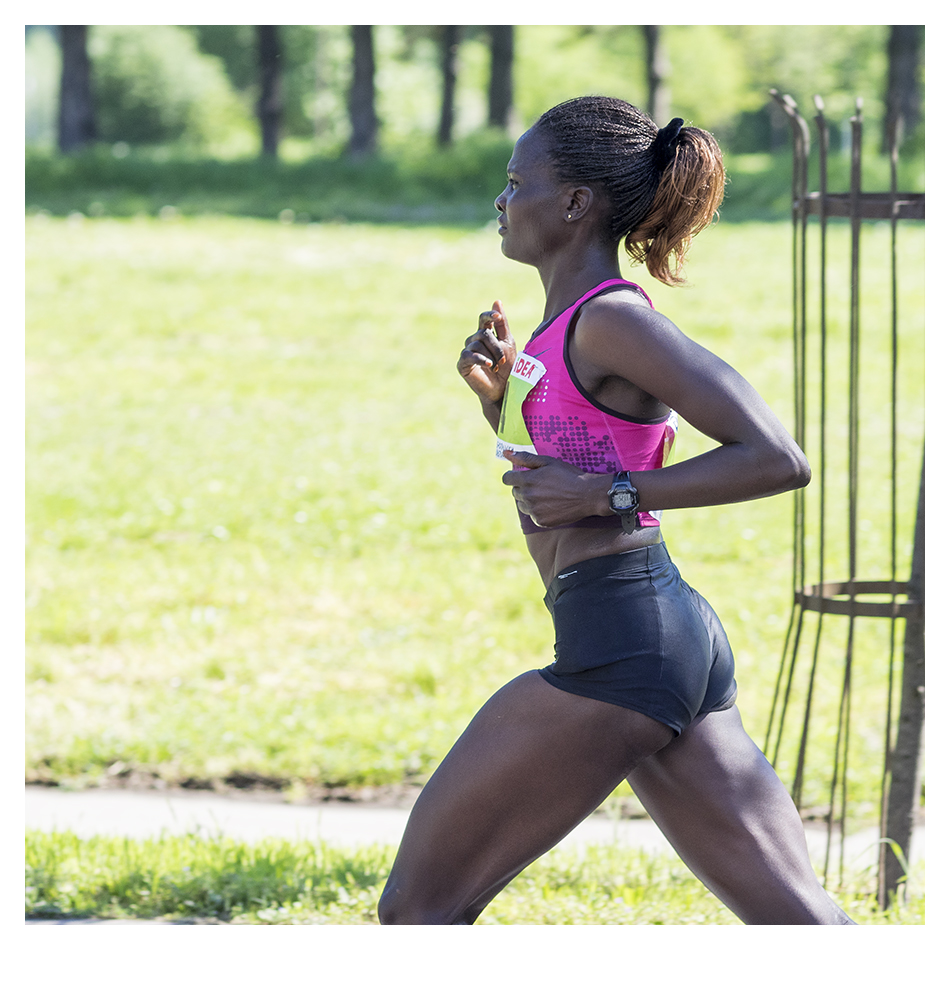
- Barsosio on the way to win the 2016 Belgrade Marathon

Personal information
- Full name: Stellah Jepngetich Barsosio
- Nationality: Kenyan
- Born: March 12, 1993 (age 32)

Sport
- Country: Kenya
- Sport: Athletics
- Event: Long-distance running

Stella Barsosio (born 12 March 1993) is a Kenyan long-distance runner. In 2021, she won the Rotterdam Marathon.

On 6 February 2023, it was announced that Barsosio had been banned for two years by Anti-Doping Agency of Kenya after testing positive for trimetazidine. Her suspension was retroactively applied, starting on 17 August 2022.

== Career ==
In 2016, Stella Barsosio won the Belgrade Marathon with a time of 2:43:41.

In 2017, she won the Cracovia Marathon with a time of 2:33:01, and the Skopje Marathon, setting a new course record of 2:33:42.

In 2018, she finished in second place in the Singapore Marathon, and in 2019, she also finished in second place in this event. In 2019, Barsosio won the Sydney Marathon, setting a new course record of 2:24:33, and finished in second place in the Rotterdam Marathon.

== Achievements ==
Representing Kenya
Year	Competition	Venue	Position	Event	Notes
2016	Belgrade Marathon	Belgrade, Serbia	1st	Marathon	2:43:41
2017	Cracovia Marathon	Kraków, Poland	1st	Marathon	2:33:01
2017	Skopje Marathon	Skopje, North Macedonia	1st	Marathon	2:33:42
2018	Singapore Marathon	Singapore, Singapore	2nd	Marathon	2:33:23
2019	Rotterdam Marathon	Rotterdam, Netherlands	2nd	Marathon	2:23:36
2019	Sydney Marathon	Sydney, Australia	1st	Marathon	2:24:33
2019	Singapore Marathon	Singapore, Singapore	2nd	Marathon	2:30:20
2021	Rotterdam Marathon	Rotterdam, Netherlands	1st	Marathon	2:22:08
