= Alemayehu Shumye =

Ethiopian long-distance runner (1988–2013)

Alemayehu Shumye Tafere (1988 – 11 January 2013) was an Ethiopian long-distance runner who specialised in marathon running.

== Biography ==
Shumye was born in 1988, in Nazret. He took up running seriously in 2004 when he moved to Addis Ababa with the hope of emulating the success of Haile Gebrselassie. He made his marathon debut in 2008 at the Marathon del Riso in Vercelli and won the race in a time of 2:14:33. He ran in two other marathons that year, winning the Warsaw Marathon in 2:11:50 – a course record and personal best – and then breaking the course record to win the Beirut Marathon in November. He came tenth at the Zurich Marathon in 2009 and significantly improved his personal best at the Frankfurt Marathon, running a time of 2:08:46 for fifth place as the only non-Kenyan to reach the top eight.

Shumye was among the leaders of the Xiamen Marathon in January 2010, but fell back at the 35 km mark, eventually taking fifth place. He returned to the race the following year and took third place in 2:09:58, his second sub-2:10 clocking. In his second run of 2011, he finished in the top five of the Rotterdam Marathon, again running under two hours and ten minutes. He was one of six men to go under the previous course record at the Ljubljana Marathon in October, but did not make the podium with his fifth-place finish. Shumye won the Gold Coast Marathon on 1 July 2012 in Gold Coast, Queensland, Australia.

Shumye died on January 11, 2013, aged 24, in Addis Ababa, from a traffic collision.
