= Sundown Marathon =

The Sundown Marathon, previously known as Adidas Sundown Marathon, is an annual Sports Tourism event that started in 2008. The race takes place in Singapore.

The marathon is organized by the same team that made the Aviva Ironman 70.3 Singapore Triathlon possible. It attracts a diverse group of athletes and managed to attract 10,670 entrants in 2009.

There are different races and they are namely the ultramarathon (84.39 km), the marathon (42.195 km), the Women (10 km) and the Team/Corporate Challenge (10 km x 4 runners). The races all fall on the same night with different start times. In 2011, 84 km ultramarathon was replaced with 100 km ultramarathon. Runners are required to pay a fee to participate in the race. The price varies according to registration date, race selected, and the runners' history of participation in the event.

== History ==
The 2011 Sundown Marathon marked the first time that the races did not take place on the same night. The marathons took place on 28 May 2011, while the ultramarathon took place 25 June 2011.

The 2020 edition of the race was cancelled due to the coronavirus pandemic, with all registered runners gaining direct entry into the 2021 edition of the race.

As of 3 March 2009, more than 10,000 men and women had signed up for “Singapore’s Toughest Race”. This total breaks the event's previous entry record of 6,088 participants. Despite the fact that it is a relatively new race present in Singapore, the overwhelming response shows its potential to become a well-respected event. The 2009 event's route traveled through some of east's most beautiful urban parks as well as major local landmarks such as Bedok Reservoir, East Coast Park and the Changi Ferry Terminal; all set to the backdrop of Singapore's night sky. A new addition to the event is also the introduction of the Women's 10 km which has garnered remarkable response from the public which totaled around 2,200 runners.

== Impact and discernible trends of the event ==
The event has an economic impact from the number of workers that it employs and the tourism that it brings to the area.

=== Tourism receipts ===
As the sundown Marathon is the largest night race held in Asia and Singapore, it was largely lauded and publicized (due to successful previous year) and this second year has seen an increase in foreign participants, especially from Malaysia and other neighboring countries. “Of the 600 entrants, the Adidas Sundown Marathon will also be hosting one of the biggest contingents of international. Ultramarathon runners with more than 12% of the participants coming from beyond Singapore's borders.“

=== Events as attractions ===
Sundown Festival Village: “Organisers HiVelocity have announced a series of activities at the village including a free outdoor movie marathon. Frozen yogurt experts, Frolick, will also be giving away 3,000 free cups of Frolick yoghurt to festival village visitors throughout the night, while microbrewery and restaurant, Brewerkz, will provide a ‘Sundown Picnic Basket' of beers, soft drinks and flame-grilled burgers. The open spaces at the park offers opportunities for nocturnal picnics before, during or after the race.” Sponsors and supporters will gain economically from the events held and attract even more non-runners.

=== Sociocultural ===
The Sundown Marathon also has a positive sociocultural impact.

Sundown Marathon organizers make use of Singapore's numerous parks while planning the route, which brings runners through "some of east's most beautiful urban parks as well as major local landmarks such as Bedok Reservoir, East Coast Park and the Changi Ferry Terminal; all set to the backdrop of Singapore's night sky.” Sundown Festival village also made use of large spaces of the park to organize this family friendly event. The organizers strive to keep the routes clean, avoiding litter on the ground. This is kept in check by cleaners and volunteers.

A marathon itself may be enough to spur people on in terms of morale and determination but the Sundown Marathon makes good use of this opportunity with the different categories for the race. It includes a corporate race, which is fully registered and booked by local and multinational companies for their workers by the time registration closed. The corporate race enables company bonding and can motivate workers as well.

=== Health ===
The Sundown Marathon is a way to promote both mental and physical health. Running a marathon promotes a healthy lifestyle. As marathon runners often spend months training for the events, this lifestyle can even continue after the race. Friends and family may also become motivated and encouraged to lead a healthier lifestyle. Marathon runners often set their own goals for the race in terms of timing and distances covered. Being able to achieve these goals highly motivates the runners mentally and enables them to gain a higher self-confidence.

There are also health risks that are associated with running long distances. They may include injuries such as tendonitis, fatigue, knee or ankle sprain, extreme dehydration (electrolyte imbalance), as well as others. Although it is rare, death is even possible during a race.

== Sports tourist involved in the program ==
The event increases tourism both through international runners and the spectators that come.

At the Sundown Marathon, there are a large number of international runners competing. For the 2009 event, there were altogether 600 entrants in the ultra marathon race. Of the 600 runners, 12% of them were international runners, coming from places like Morocco and Africa. Their ages ranged from 18 to 72.

== See also ==
- Singapore Marathon
