= Kyiv Half Marathon =

Annual race in Ukraine held since 2011

- Date: April
- Location: Kyiv, Ukraine
- Event type: Road
- Distance: Half marathon, 5K run
- Primary sponsor: Work.ua
- Established: 2011 (15 years ago)
- Organizer: Run Ukraine Running League
- Course records: Men's: 1:02:56 (2018) (Ethiopia) Tesfaye Anbesa; Women's: 1:10:53 (2019) (Kenya) Daisy Kimeli
- Website: Kyiv Half Marathon
- Participants: 2,169 finishers (2021); 4,829 (2019)

The Kyiv Half Marathon is an annual road running event over the half marathon distance which is held in April on the streets of Kyiv, Ukraine since 2011. In 2015 Kyiv half marathon became a full member of the AIMS. It carries World Athletics Silver Label Road Race status. The race is part of the Run Ukraine Running League, an annual series of races held in Ukrainian cities.

== History ==
In 2018, the participants were traditionally offered to choose one of the individual courses of the event: 21.0975 km, 5 km and 2 km. Besides the individual races, the 8th Kyiv Half Marathon included relay races (1х10 km + 1х11 km HeForShe Kyiv Half Marathon Relay and 3х5 km + 1х6 km Under Armour Relay) and corporate races (Chamber Cup, Diplomat Cup, Security Cup). The organizers welcomed almost 1000 children of various ages in children's races: 1000 m, 500 m, and 100 m. The number of participants reached 11000 people (3595 participated in the half marathon race) from 52 countries.

Additionally, the 8th Kyiv Half Marathon became the first running event in Ukraine to receive the Bronze Label from the world organization IAAF.

The 2020 in-person edition of the race was canceled due to the coronavirus pandemic, with all registrants given the option of transferring their entry to 2021 or 2022, or receiving credit of equivalent value for other races. (Note: Initially, all foreigners, including elite foreign runners, were banned from running the race, but the event was eventually postponed to the second half of the year, and the ban on foreign runners lifted before the in-person event was eventually canceled.)

On 3 March 2022, a week after Russia invaded Ukraine with help from Belarus, Run Ukraine banned Russian and Belarusian runners from all its events, and stated that the runners' registration fees would be used to restore Ukraine. Two weeks later, on 17 March, Run Ukraine announced that the half marathon was postponed indefinitely.

== Course ==
External image
- Course map of half marathon in 2019

The route of the race runs across Kyiv city uniting two banks of the Dnipro river. Track surface: 97% – blacktop, 3% – paving. Total elevation gain – 172 meters. The start and finish lines of all courses are located in the same spot on Square of Contracts.

== Winners ==
Key: Course record

Ed.	Year	Men's winner	Time	Women's winner	Time	Ref.
	2022	Canceled due to the Russian invasion of Ukraine				
10	2021	Bohdan-Ivan Horodyskyy (UKR)	1:03:41	Yevheniya Prokofyeva (UKR)	1:14:11	
	2020	Canceled due to the COVID-19 pandemic				
9	2019	Bernard Sang (KEN)	1:03:42	Daisy Kimeli (KEN)	1:10:53	
8	2018	Tesfaye Anbesa (ETH)	1:02:56	Viktoriya Kalyuzhna (UKR)	1:13:44	
7	2017	Tesfaye Anbesa (ETH)	1:03:57	Belaynesh Tsegaye (ETH)	1:13:58	
6	2016	Taras Salo (UKR)	1:04:41	Hanna Nosenko (UKR)	1:13:55	
5	2015	Yuriy Rosyuk (UKR)	1:06:51	Vita Poteriuk (UKR)	1:19:52	
4	2014	Taras Salo (UKR)	1:06:34	Olga Yarotska (UKR)	1:23:07	
3	2013	Oleksandr Sitkovskyy (UKR)	1:05:33	Svitlana Stanko-Klymenko (UKR)	1:18:12	
