= Cracovia Marathon =

Annual race in Poland held since 2002

- Logo of the Cracovia Marathon
- Date: Mid-April
- Location: Kraków, Poland
- Event type: Road
- Distance: Marathon, 10K run, Wheelchair
- Established: 2002 (24 years ago)
- Course records: Men's: 2:09:18 (2019) (Kenya) Cyprian Kotut; Women's: 2:28:03 (2019) (Ukraine) Viktoriya Khapilina
- Website: Cracovia Marathon
- Participants: 2,954 finishers (2022); 5,184 (2019)

The Cracovia Marathon (Polish: Cracovia Maraton) is an annual marathon which has taken place every year in Kraków, Poland since its inception in 2002. It is one of Poland's largest marathons in terms of the number of finishers.

== History ==
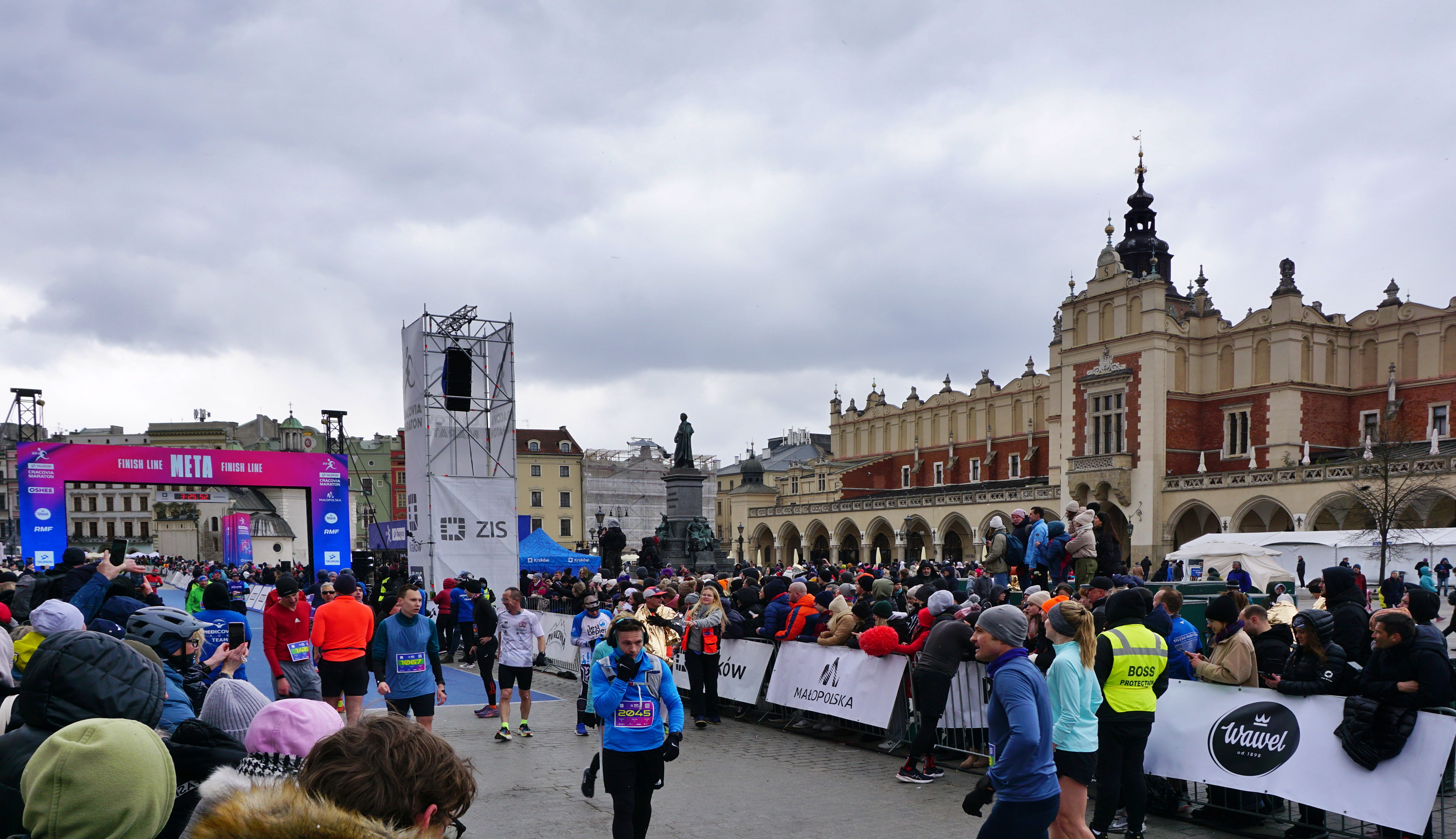
Finish of the marathon in 2025

The Cracovia Marathon was established in 2002 and has been run every year since. The marathon is held usually in May. The competition features professional athletes and amateur fun runners. A total of 3,200 people finished the race in 2011 while in 2013 a total of 4,415 participants finished the race, which made it the third largest such race in Poland after the Warsaw Marathon and the Poznań Marathon.

The marathon is one of five in the Crown of Polish Marathons program, along with the Dębno Marathon, Poznań Marathon, Warsaw Marathon, and Wrocław Marathon.

Since 2016, the Cracovia Marathon has been part of the Royal Running Triad (Polish: Królewska Triada Biegowa) alongside Cracovia Royal Half-Marathon and the Three Mounds Race.

The 2020 edition of the race was postponed to 2022 due to the coronavirus pandemic, with all entries automatically transferred to 2022 and all registrants given the option of obtaining a refund. (Note: It had initially been postponed to 8 November before being postponed to 2021 and then to 2022.)

== Winners ==
Key: Course record

Ed.	Year	Men's winner	Time	Women's winner	Time	Rf.
1	2002	Thomas Magut (KEN)	2:19:24	Mirela Zięcina (POL)	3:02:16	
2	2003	Azzedine Sakhri (ALG)	2:17:59	Norah Maraga (KEN)	2:50:09	
3	2004	Henry Kimeli (KEN)	2:16:52	Zahia Dahmani (FRA)	2:42:15	
4	2005	Piotr Gładki (POL)	2:19:30	Janina Malska (POL)	2:43:20	
5	2006	Matthew Kosgei (KEN)	2:17:16	Alena Mazouka (BLR)	2:43:53	
6	2007	Matthew Kosgei (KEN)	2:18:16	Kateryna Stetsenko (UKR)	2:39:08	
7	2008	Andrei Hardzeyeu (BLR)	2:13:41	Olha Kotovska (UKR)	2:39:49	
8	2009	Julius Kilimo (KEN)	2:11:26	Nastassia Padalinskaya (BLR)	2:36:29	
9	2010	Abebe Dagane (ETH)	2:16:13	Etaferahu Tarekegne (ETH)	2:37:22	
10	2011	Cosmas Kyeva (KEN)	2:12:20	Tetyana Hamera-Shmyrko (UKR)	2:28:14	
11	2012	Peter Wanjiru (KEN)	2:12:11	Lucia Kimani (BIH)	2:36:54	
12	2013	Patrick Nyangero (TAN)	2:19:08	Emilia Zielińska (POL)	3:03:15	
13	2014	Edwin Kirui (KEN)	2:15:17	Elizabeth Chemweno (KEN)	2:38:06	
14	2015	Taras Salo (UKR)	2:17:03	Hellen Kimutai (KEN)	2:43:04	
15	2016	Cosmas Kyeva (KEN)	2:11:58	Gladys Chemweno (KEN)	2:30:30	
16	2017	Cosmas Kyeva (KEN)	2:12:52	Stella Barsosio (KEN)	2:33:01	
17	2018	Birhanu Bekele (ETH)	2:11:34	Lilia Fisikovici (MDA)	2:31:27	
18	2019	Cyprian Kotut (KEN)	2:09:18	Viktoriya Khapilina (UKR)	2:28:03	
—	2020	postponed to 2021 due to coronavirus pandemic				
—	2021	postponed to 2022 due to coronavirus pandemic				
19	2022	David Metto (KEN)	2:14:07	Lilia Fisikovici (MDA)	2:40:35	
20	2023	Lani Ruto (KEN)	2:17:05	Lina Kiriluik (LTU)	2:42:25	

=== By country ===
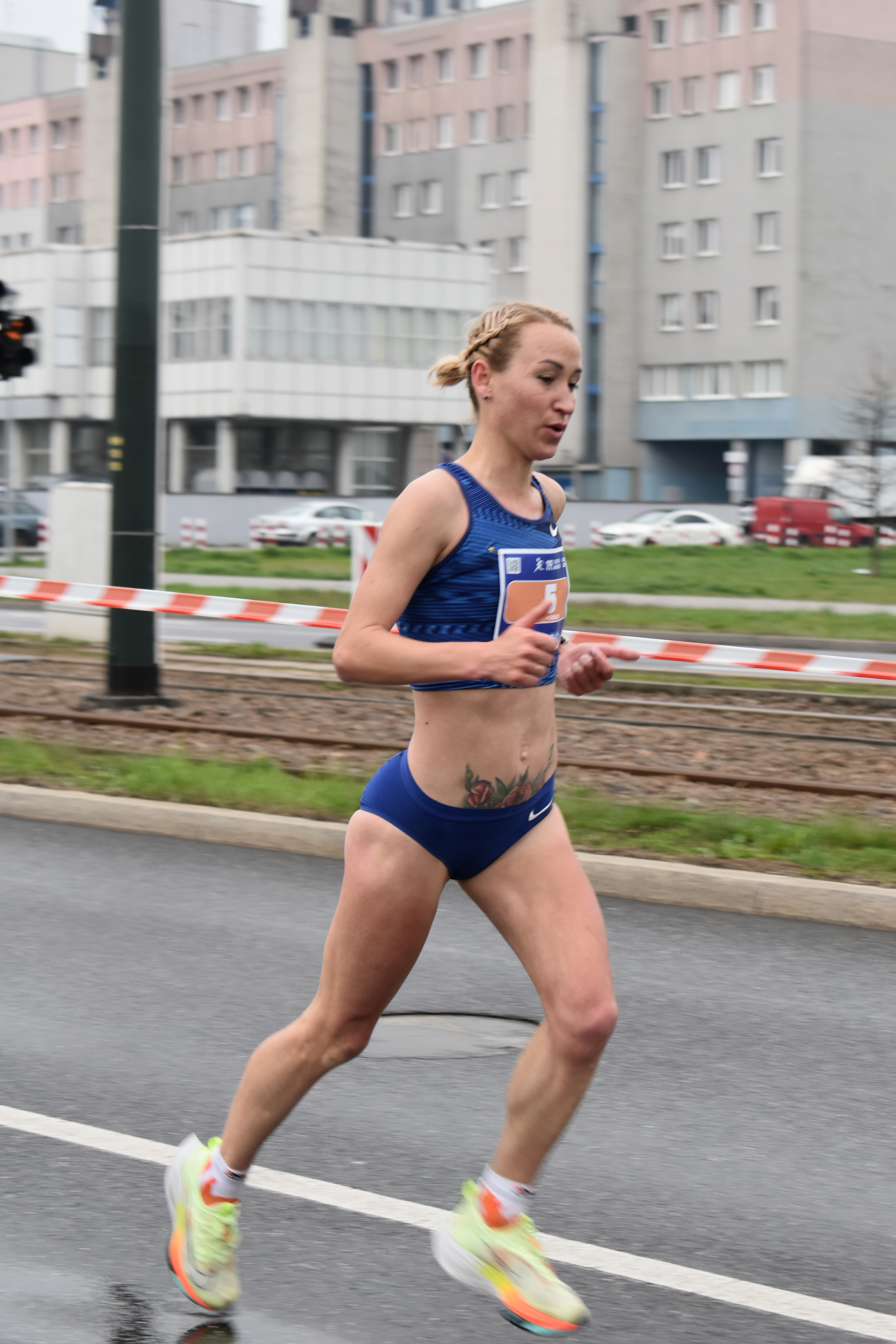
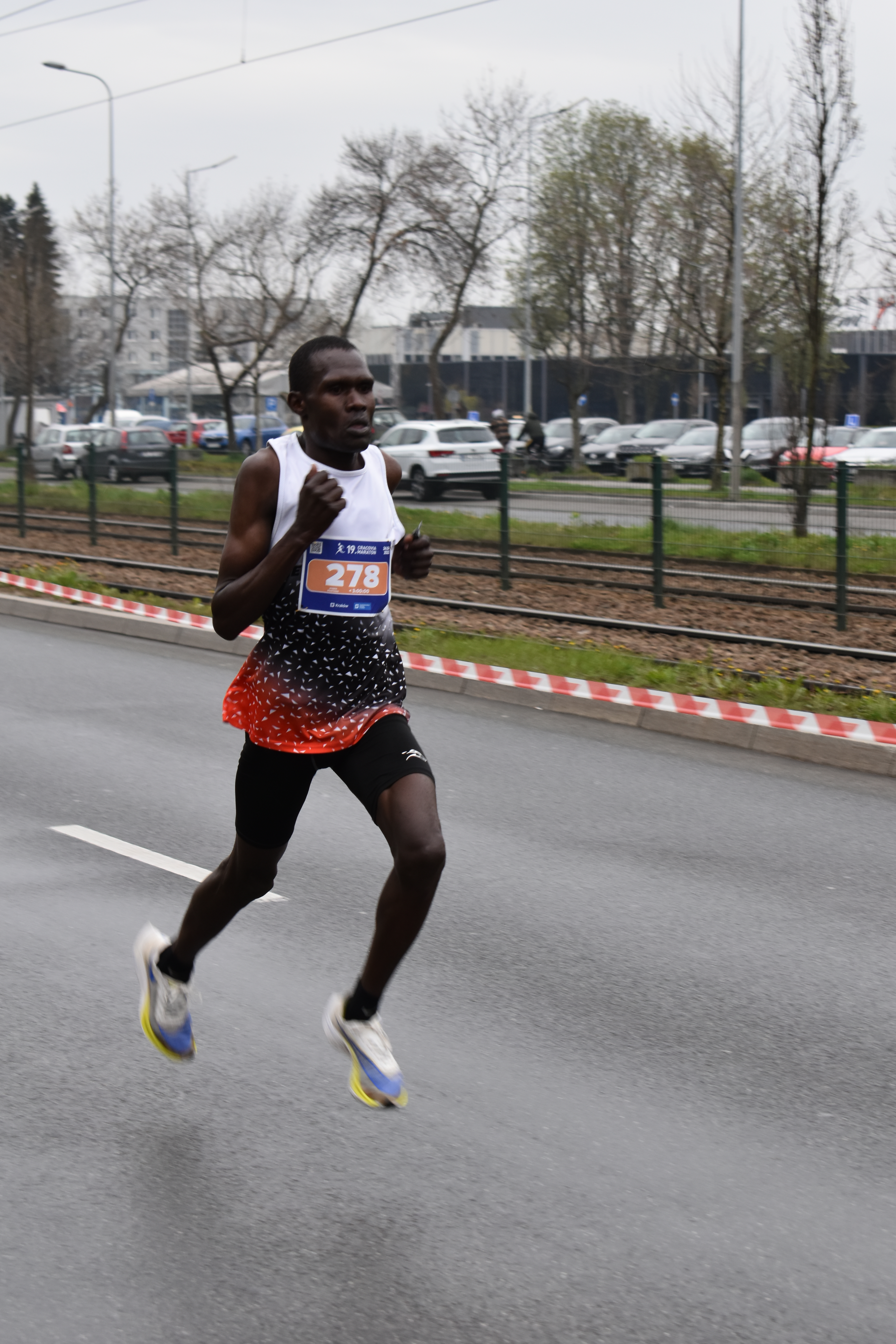
2018 & 2022 winner Lilia Fisikovici (left) of Moldova and 2022 winner David Metto of Kenya en route to winning their respective marathons

Country	Total	Men's	Women's
Kenya	18	13	5
Ukraine	5	1	4
Poland	4	1	3
Belarus	3	1	2
Ethiopia	3	2	1
Moldova	2	0	2
Algeria	1	1	0
Bosnia and Herzegovina	1	0	1
France	1	0	1
Lithuania	1	0	1
Tanzania	1	1	0

== See also ==
- Sport in Poland
- Warsaw Marathon
