= Warsaw Marathon =

Annual race in Poland since 1979

- Date: Late September or early October
- Location: Warsaw, Poland
- Event type: Road
- Distance: Marathon
- Primary sponsor: Nationale-Nederlanden
- Established: 30 September 1979 (47 years ago)
- Course records: Men's: 2:08:17 (2011) (Kenya) John Kibet; Women's: 2:24:48 (2026) (Hungary) Lili Anna Vindics-Tóth
- Website: Official website
- Participants: 10,830 finishers (2026)

The Warsaw Marathon (Polish: Maraton Warszawski pronounced: [maˈratɔn varˈʂafskʲi], also referred to as the PZU Warsaw Marathon (Note: This name may be used for sponsorship reasons or to distinguish it from the Orlen Warsaw Marathon.) and Nationale-Nederlanden Warsaw Marathon since 2023) is an annual marathon event which takes place on the streets of Warsaw, Poland. It is the oldest annual marathon in Poland, held since 1979. The marathon is organized by the non-governmental organization Fundacja Maraton Warszawski. The race usually takes place on the last Sunday of September and is categorized as an Elite Label Road Race by World Athletics.

It is one of two marathons hosted in the city, alongside the Orlen Warsaw Marathon, which was held in 2013–2019. The marathon is one of five in the Crown of Polish Marathons program, along with the Dębno, Kraków, Poznań, and Wrocław Marathons.

Polish competitors usually triumphed in the early editions of the event both in the men's and women's competitions. However, since the fall of communism in 1989, the race has attracted more international participants who started to dominate the race. The current course records are 2:08:17 hours for men, set by John Kibet of Kenya in 2011, while Hungarian Lili Anna Vindics-Tóth's run of 2:24:48 in 2026 is the fastest by a woman on the course.

== History ==
The marathon was first held on 30 September 1979 under the original name "1st Marathon of Peace" (to convince socialistic regime about the idea of "run for health, run for all"). It happened thanks to the three brave people: Tomasz Hopfer (TVP journalist and runner), Józef Węgrzyn (journalist and runner) and Zbigniew Zaremba (1st director of the Warsaw Marathon; and running coach). In the inaugural race, the length of the course was just 40.6 kilometres (25.2 mi), and not the normal, classic distance of 42.195 km (26.219 mi).

In 2000 the men's race and in 2012 the women's race had the status of Polish Marathon National Championships.

From 2013, the Polish insurance company Powszechny Zakład Ubezpieczeń (PZU) became a title sponsor, and the marathon was renamed "PZU Warsaw Marathon".

External image
- Course map of full marathon in 2020

In 2020, due to the coronavirus pandemic, organizers rescheduled the marathon to take place over four separate heats during the weekend, with each heat having a maximum of 250 runners. (Note: Restrictions due to the pandemic limited the number of people that could simultaneously compete in a race to 250 people.) In addition, the course was changed to a loop of 5 km (3.1 mi) in the center of the city. (Note: The start and finish was located on Senator Street in front of Theatre Square, and the majority of the loop was located on the Krakowskie Przedmieście and Miodowa Streets.) Since nearly 2000 runners had already registered for the race, a lottery was held to determine who was allowed to participate, with those denied a spot allowed to transfer their entry to 2021 or obtain a refund. (Note: Before the lottery was held, all registrants were given the option of transferring their entry to 2021 in case any were uninterested in participating.)

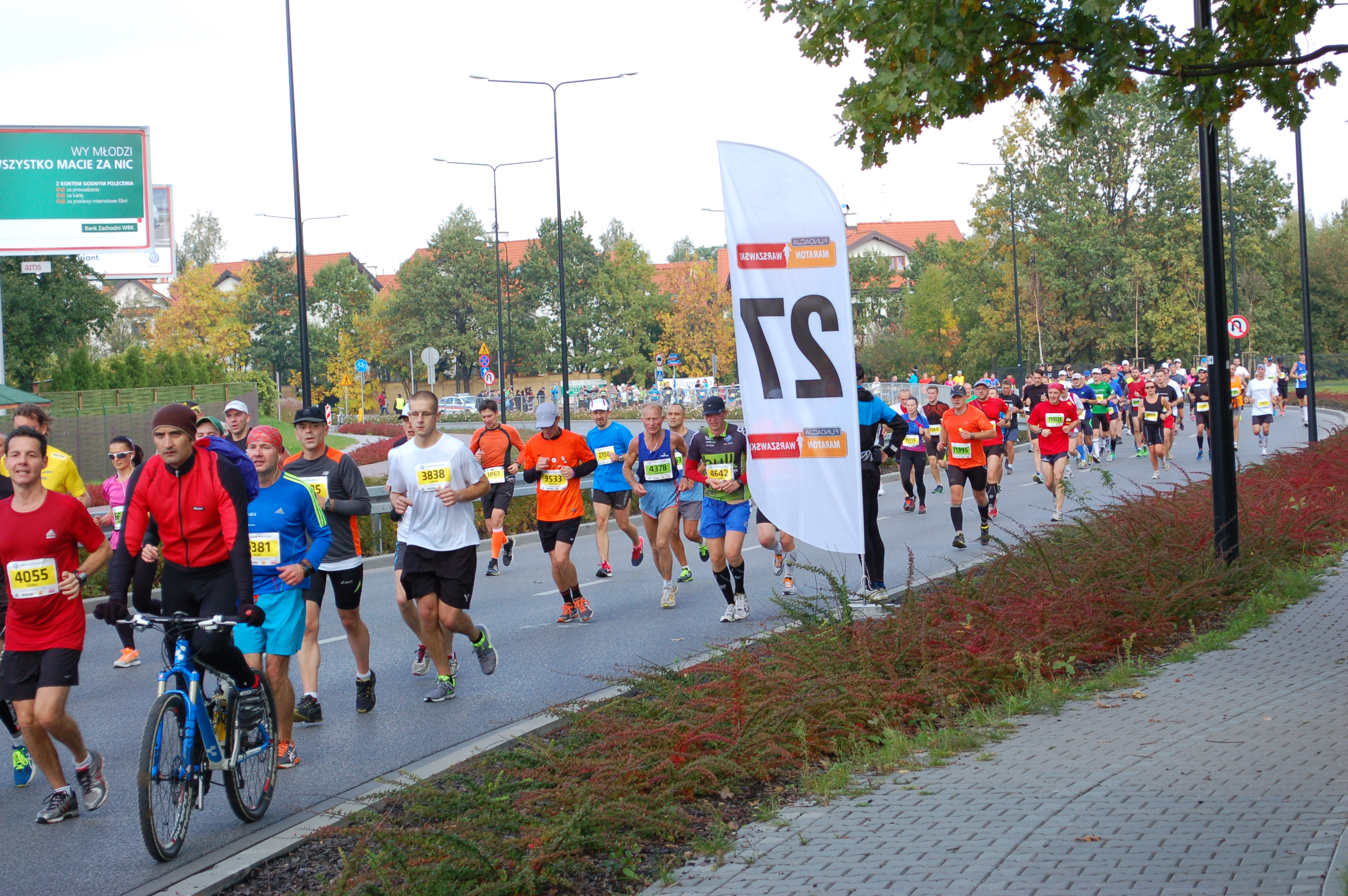
Participants passing the 27th kilometre mark in 2013

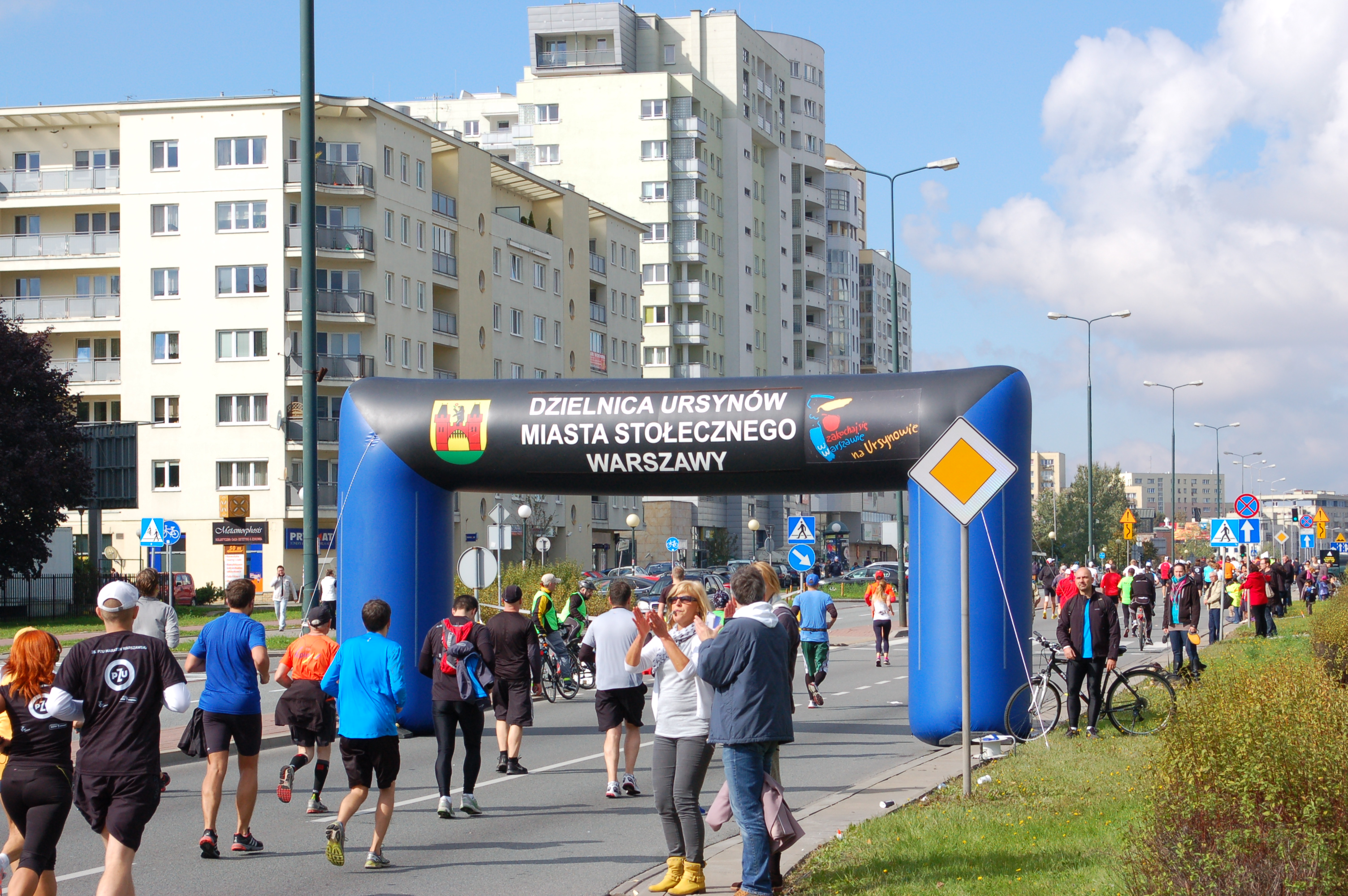
Runners entering the district of Ursynów during the 35th edition of the marathon.

Schedule of heats in 2020
Heat	Date	Time	Time limit
1	26 September 2020	16:00	6.5 hours
2	27 September 2020	00:00	6.5 hours
3	27 September 2020	08:00	4.0 hours
4	27 September 2020	13:00	6.0 hours

== Other races ==
Although the main attraction is the marathon, there is also a handbike marathon and a "High Five Race" (5 km race).

Since 2022, a 10-kilometre race aimed at beginners known as the Pekao SA Warszawska Dycha (Warsaw Tenner) has also been organized as part of the event. Since 2023, it is known as Nice to Fit You Warszawska Dycha.

== Other activities ==
During the marathon weekend, additional activities take place, such as a sport and fitness expo, running seminars, and activities for children.

== Results ==
Key: Course record

Year	Finishers	Men's winner	Country	Time	Women's winner	Country	Time	Rf.
2026	10, 830	Stephen Kibor	Kenya	2:09:19	Lili Anna Vindics-Tóth	Hungary	2:24:48	
2025	9,527	Ryoma Takeuchi	Japan	2:11:21	Michelle Schaub	Switzerland	2:33:41	
2024	7,079	Levente Szemerei	Hungary	2:10:43	Olga Nyzhnyk	Ukraine	2:31:24	
2023	5,555	Levente Szemerei	Hungary	2:15:29	Ewa Jagielska	Poland	2:34:41	
2022	3,707	Joseph Munywoki	Kenya	2:10:07	Demissie Ayantu	Ethiopia	2:28:35	
2021	2,734	Yared Shegumo	Poland	2:14:38	Monika Andrzejczak	Poland	2:31:11	
2020	854 (Note: Limited due to restrictions during the coronavirus pandemic.)	Paweł Kosek	Poland	2:23:14	Dominika Stelmach-Stawczyk	Poland	2:41:57	
2019	4,557	Dadi Yami	Ethiopia	2:11:39	Rebecca Korir	Kenya	2:29:04	
2018	7,528	David Metto	Kenya	2:12:44	Beatrice Cherop	Kenya	2:35:22	
2017	5,460	Błażej Brzeziński	Poland	2:11:27	Bekelu Beji	Ethiopia	2:35:09	
2016	5,921	Ezekiel Omullo	Kenya	2:08:55	Gladys Kibiwot	Bahrain	2:36:34	
2015	5,491	Ezekiel Omullo	Kenya	2:09:19	Ruth Wanjiru	Kenya	2:29:39	
2014	6,679	Victor Kipchirchir	Kenya	2:09:59	Svitlana Stanko	Ukraine	2:33:04	
2013	8,506	Yared Shegumo	Poland	2:10:34	Goitetom Haftu	Ethiopia	2:29:32	
2012	6,796	James Mutua	Kenya	2:15:02	Agnieszka Ciołek	Poland	2:34:15	
2011	4,061	John Kibet	Kenya	2:08:17	Svitlana Stanko	Ukraine	2:31:28	
2010	3,322	Tola Bane	Ethiopia	2:13:10	Tetyana Holovchenko	Ukraine	2:31:37	
2009	3,164	Teshome Gelana	Ethiopia	2:12:03	Anastasiya Padalinskaya	Belarus	2:44:55	
2008	2,640	Alemayehu Shumye	Ethiopia	2:11:50	Małgorzata Sobańska	Poland	2:31:20	
2007	2,119	Paweł Ochal	Poland	2:12:20	Valentina Poltavska	Ukraine	2:40:18	
2006	1,860	Vitalij Shafar	Ukraine	2:12:29	Nina Podnebesnowa	Russia	2:42:43	
2005	1,689	Grzegorz Gajdus	Poland	2:14:50	Nina Kolyasewa	Russia	2:34:53	
2004	937	Radosław Dudycz	Poland	2:17:21	Janina Malska	Poland	2:48:41	
2003	1,063	Artur Pelo	Poland	2:20:41	Karina Szymańska	Poland	2:42:04	
2002	307	Dmitrijs Šlesarenoks	Latvia	2:30:02	Marlena Żołnowska	Poland	3:36:19	
2001	564	Bartosz Mazerski	Poland	2:24:45	Maria Bąk	Germany	2:48:31	
2000	587	Mirosław Plawgo	Poland	2:15:57	Ewa Fliegert	Poland	2:51:02	
1999	693	David Ngetich	Kenya	2:16:31	Karina Szymańska	Poland	2:45:44	
1998	867	Grzegorz Głogosz	Poland	2:17:06	Karina Szymańska	Poland	2:36:24	
1997	700	Wiesław Lenda	Poland	2:25:39	Karina Szymańska	Poland	2:42:18	
1996	658	Artur Ociepa	Poland	2:18:14	Yelena Tsukhlo	Belarus	2:37:48	
1995	779	Christo Stefanov	Bulgaria	2:15:37	Yelena Tsukhlo	Belarus	2:37:21	
1994	788	Wiesław Lenda	Poland	2:17:50	Yelena Tsukhlo	Belarus	2:42:36	
1993	520	Julius Mitibani	Tanzania	2:20:26	Polina Grigorenko	Russia	2:55:25	
1992	794	Jacek Kasprzyk	Poland	2:17:38	Aniela Nikiel	Poland	2:42:27	
1991	852	Ryszard Misiewicz	Poland	2:19:50	Małgorzata Birbach	Poland	2:47:21	
1990	1,129	Krzysztof Niedziółka	Poland	2:20:08	Ewa Olas	Poland	2:42:48	
1989	1,222	Jerzy Skarżyński	Poland	2:22:19	Ewa Bober	Poland	3:01:14	
1988	1,596	Paweł Tarasiuk	Poland	2:17:37	Stefania Kozik	Poland	2:55:34	
1987	1,398	Wiesław Lenda	Poland	2:24:47	Renata Walendziak	Poland	2:38:24	
1986	1,505	Józef Mitka	Poland	2:19:48	Maria Kawiorska	Poland	2:46:48	
1985	1,607	Andrzej Malicki	Poland	2:20:29	Irina Hulanicka	Soviet Union	2:46:21	
1984	1,914	Miroslaw Rudnik	Poland	2:25:15	Stefania Kozik	Poland	3:06:02	
1983	1,919	Stanimir Nenov	Bulgaria	2:23:55	Irena Maliborska	Poland	2:59:38	
1982	1,727	Zbigniew Pierzynka	Poland	2:24:09	Helena Kozioryńska	Poland	3:08:52	
1981	2,015	Jerzy Finster	Poland	2:17:06	Cindy Wuss	United States	2:51:22	
1980	2,289	Jerzy Gros	Poland	2:22:12	Anna Bełtowska	Poland	3:05:14	
1979	1,861	Kazimierz Pawlik	Poland	2:11:34 (Note: Shorter distance (about 40.6 km))	Renata Pentlinowska	Poland	2:51:38	

=== Multiple wins ===
Athlete	Wins	Years
Karina Szymańska (POL)	4	1997, 1998, 1999, 2003
Wiesław Lenda (POL)	3	1987, 1994, 1997
Yelena Tsukhlo (BLR)	3	1994, 1995, 1996
Stefania Kozik (POL)	2	1984, 1988
Ezekiel Omullo (KEN)	2	2015, 2016
Yared Shegumo (POL)	2	2013, 2021
Svitlana Stanko (UKR)	2	2011, 2014
Levente Szemerei (HUN)	2	2023, 2024

=== By country ===
Country	Total	Men's	Women's
Poland	51	27	24
Kenya	12	9	3
Ethiopia	7	4	3
Ukraine	6	1	5
Belarus	4	0	4
Hungary	3	2	1
Russia	3	0	3
Bulgaria	2	2	0
Bahrain	1	0	1
Germany	1	0	1
Japan	1	1	0
Soviet Union	1	0	1
Switzerland	1	0	1
Tanzania	1	1	0
United States	1	0	1

== See also ==
- Orlen Warsaw Marathon
- Cracovia Marathon
- Poznań Marathon
- Warsaw Half Marathon
- Sport in Poland
