= Ezekiel Omullo =

Kenyan long-distance runner and poultry farmer

Personal information
- Nationality: Kenyan
- Born: Ezekiel Kemboi Omullo; 10 December 1987 (age 38) Kenya
- Occupations: Long-distance runner; poultry farmer
- Years active: 2016–present

Sport
- Country: Kenya
- Sport: Long-distance running
- Event: Marathon

Achievements and titles
- Personal bests: Marathon: 2:08:26 (Gold Coast, 2 July 2023)

Ezekiel Kemboi Omullo (born 10 December 1987) is a Kenyan marathon runner and a poultry farmer. He won the 2016 Warsaw Marathon. After a period away from elite competition to focus on his poultry farming business during the COVID-19 pandemic, Omullo made his return to win the 2022 Standard Chartered Singapore Marathon and setting his personal best of 2:08:26 at the 2023 Gold Coast Marathon.

== Career ==
Omullo made his marathon debut in 2016, immediately winning the Warsaw Marathon with a time of 2:08:55, which stood as his personal best for several years. In 2017, he took third place at the Seoul International Marathon in 2:09:10, contributing to an all-Kenyan podium.

During the 2020–2021 period, with many international races cancelled due to the COVID-19 pandemic, Omullo shifted his focus to his poultry farming business in Kenya, relying on it as his primary source of livelihood. In December 2022, Omullo achieved a comeback victory at the Standard Chartered Singapore Marathon, winning in 2:20:20 in his debut at the event.

In July 2023, Omullo ran a new personal best of 2:08:26 to finish second at the Gold Coast Marathon. Later that year, he returned to Singapore to defend his title at the Standard Chartered Singapore Marathon, placing sixth with a time of 2:14:50.

== Personal bests ==
- Marathon: 2:08:26 (Gold Coast, 2 July 2023)

== Achievements ==
Year	Competition	Venue	Position	Time
2016	Warsaw Marathon	Warsaw, Poland	1st	2:08:55
2017	Seoul International Marathon	Seoul, South Korea	3rd	2:09:10
2022	Standard Chartered Singapore Marathon	Singapore	1st	2:20:20
2023	Gold Coast Marathon	Gold Coast, Australia	2nd	2:08:26
2023	Standard Chartered Singapore Marathon	Singapore	6th	2:14:50
