= Victor Covalenco =

Moldovan decathlete

Victor Covalenco (born 26 October 1975) is a Moldovan decathlete and a two-time Olympian for his native country.

== Achievements ==
Year	Competition	Venue	Position	Notes
Representing Moldova
2004	Olympic Games	Athens, Greece	30th	Decathlon
2008	Olympic Games	Beijing, PR China	DNF	Decathlon
