= Poznań Marathon =

Annual race in Poland since 2000

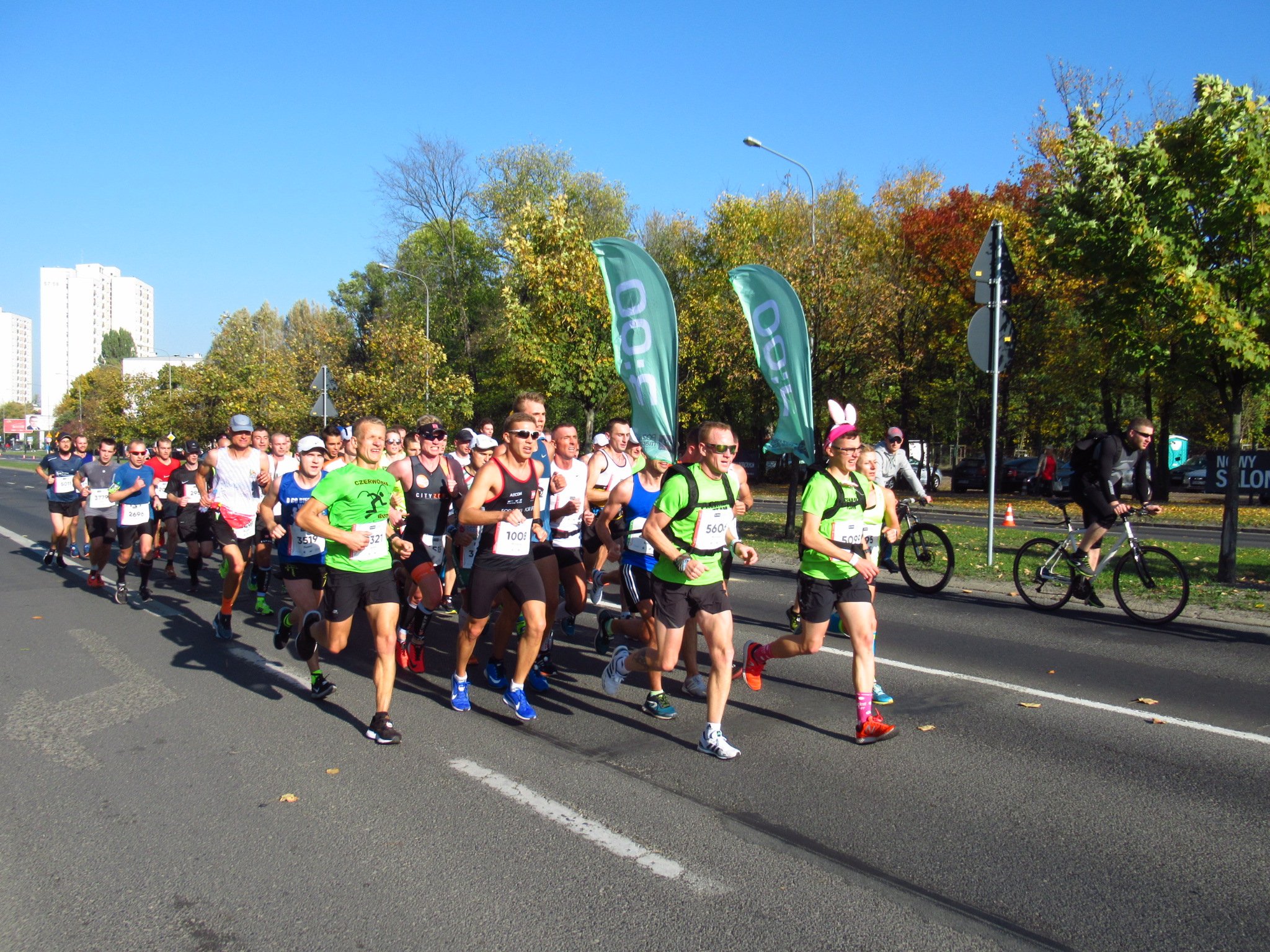
- Running with the 3:00 pace group in 2018
- Date: October
- Location: Poznań, Poland
- Event type: Road
- Distance: Marathon
- Established: 2000 (26 years ago)
- Course records: Men's: 2:09:57 (2023) (Eritrea) Petro Mamu Shaku; Women's: 2:27:01 (2022) (Kenya) Caroline Kilel
- Website: https://marathon.poznan.pl/en/
- Participants: 6112 finishers (2019); 4914 finishers (2018)

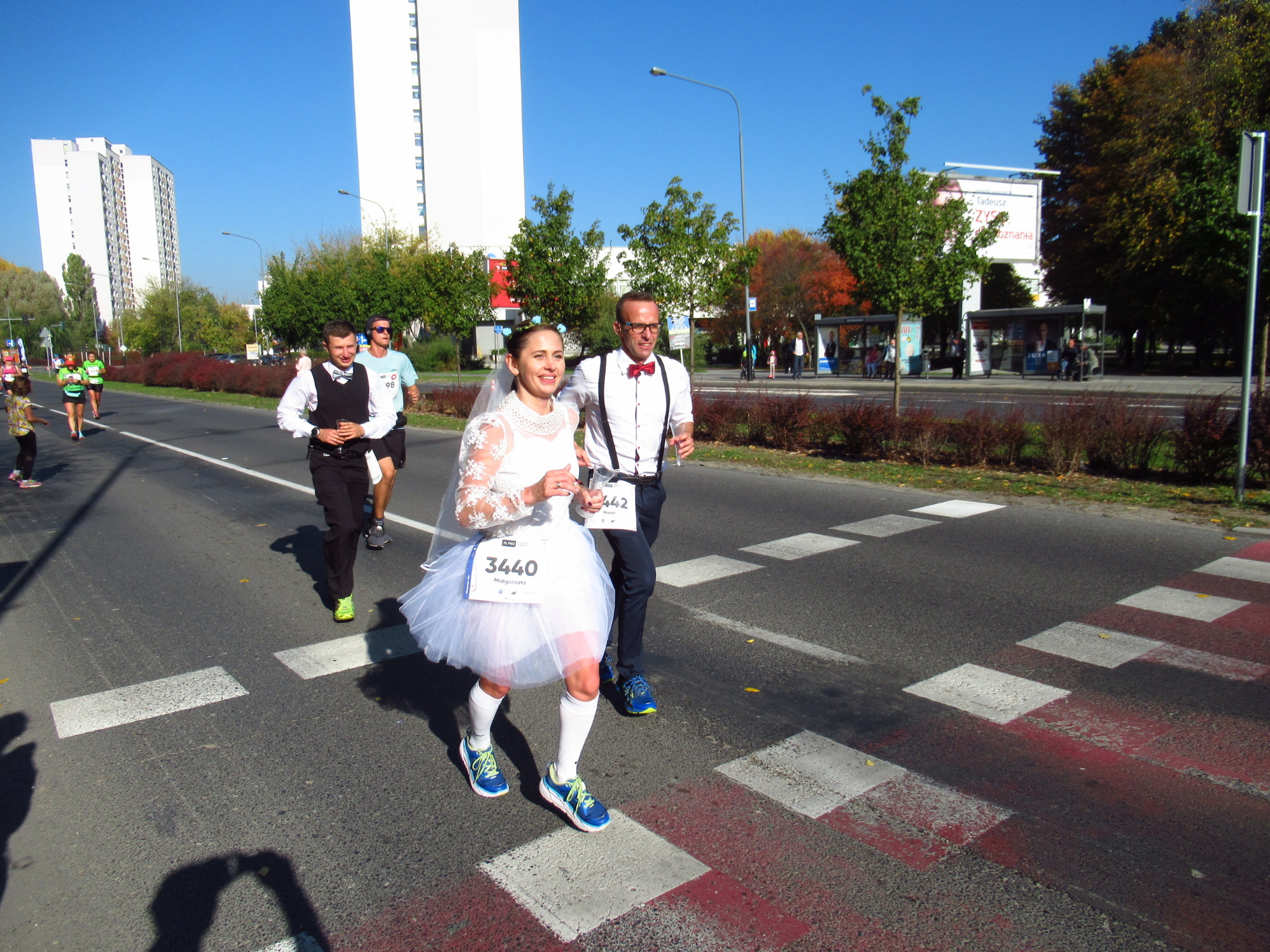
Dressed up for the occasion in 2018

The Poznań Marathon (Polish: Poznań Maraton imienia Macieja Frankiewicza (Note: It is also known as the "Maciej Frankiewicz Poznań Marathon", and was also known as the "PKO Poznań Marathon" or the "Maciej Frankiewicz PKO Poznań Marathon" for sponsorship reasons.)) is an annual road-based marathon hosted by Poznań, Poland, since 2000. It was categorized as a Bronze Label Road Race by the International Association of Athletics Federations and is a member of the Association of International Marathons and Distance Races.

The marathon is one of five in the Crown of Polish Marathons program, along with the Dębno Marathon, Kraków, Warsaw, and Wrocław Marathon.

== History ==
The inaugural race was held on 15 October 2000 as the "Hansaplast Poznań Marathon". A total of 763 (Note: This total includes 2 wheelchair finishers, but excludes 29 finishers using inline skates.) people finished the race, which was won by Polish runners Andrzej Krzyścin and Dorota Gruca, with finish times of 2:17:23 and 2:37:22, respectively.

In 2012, the winner of the men's race Edwin Kosgei Yator of Kenya (who won the race with the time 2:16:16) failed anti-doping tests and as a consequence was stripped of the title. The winner of the 2012 edition of Poznań Marathon was another Kenyan, Edwin Kirui.

In 2013, the Poznań Marathon was finished by a total of 5,678 participants, which made it the second largest marathon in the country behind only the Warsaw Marathon.

Among notable participants of the Poznań Marathon are politicians including Mayors of Poznań who run in the marathon traditionally wearing the number one.

The 2020 edition of the race was postponed to 2021 before being cancelled due to the coronavirus pandemic, with all registrants receiving a refund.

== Winners ==
Key: Course record

Ed.	Date	Male Winner	Time	Female Winner	Time	Rf.
1	2000.10.15	Andrzej Krzyścin (POL)	2:17:23	Dorota Gruca (POL)	2:37:22	
2	2001.10.14	Waldemar Glinka (POL)	2:15:38	Aniela Nikiel (POL)	2:43:59	
3	2002.10.6	Joseph Kibor (KEN)	2:16:36	Wioletta Uryga (POL)	2:35:28	
4	2003.10.5	Andrzej Krzyścin (POL)	2:17:57	Krystyna Kuta (POL)	2:38:13	
5	2004.10.10	Mykhaylo Iveruk (UKR)	2:17:55	Arleta Meloch (POL)	2:41:19	
6	2005.10.16	Leszek Bebło (POL)	2:17:07	Natalya Kravets-Kulesh (BLR)	2:40:47	
7	2006.10.15	Jan Białk (POL)	2:16:21	Anzhelika Averkova (UKR)	2:37:07	
8	2007.10.14	Paul Tangus (KEN)	2:16:24	Ewa Brych-Pająk (POL)	2:39:59	
9	2008.10.08	Matthew Kibowen Kosgei (KEN)	2:13:45	Arleta Meloch (POL)	2:38:22	
10	2009.10.11	Samsom Kimeli Chebii (KEN)	2:19:14	Agnieszka Gortel (POL)	2:37:08	
11	2010.10.10	Isaack Waweru Macharia (KEN)	2:16:27	Maryna Damantsevich (BLR)	2:36:30	
12	2011.10.11	Cosmas Kyeva (KEN)	2:11:53	Arleta Meloch (POL)	2:39:12	
13	2012.10.14	Edwin Kirui (KEN)	2:17:38	Sviatlana Kouhan (BLR)	2:35:08	
14	2013.10.13	David Kiptui Tarus (KEN)	2:13:08	Maryna Damantsevich (BLR)	2:36:02	
15	2014.10.12	Kiprotich Kirui (KEN)	2:13:28	Irene Makori Chepkirui (KEN)	2:31:55	
16	2015.10.11	Emil Dobrowolski (POL)	2:13:50	Irene Makori Chepkirui (KEN)	2:32:48	
17	2016.10.09	Terer Dickson (KEN)	2:16:58	Agnieszka Gortel-Maciuk (POL)	2:35:39	
18	2017.10.15	Mykola Iukhymchuk (UKR)	2:14:30	Haruna Takada (JPN)	2:40:49	
19	2018.10.14	Cosmas Mutuku Kyeva (KEN)	2:11:45	Tesfanesh Merga Denbi (ETH)	2:32:31	
20	2019.10.20	Cosmas Kyeva (KEN)	2:12:05	Monika Stefanowicz (POL)	2:37:42	
—	2020	Cancelled due to coronavirus pandemic				
—	2021	Cancelled due to coronavirus pandemic				
21	2022.10.16	Bazu Hayla (ETH)	2:11:27	Caroline Kilel (KEN)	2:27:01	
22	2023.10.22	Petro Mamu Shaku (ERI)	2:09:57	Tseginesh Mekonnin Legesse (ETH)	2:27:28	

=== By country ===
Country	Total	Men's	Women's
Poland	17	6	11
Kenya	15	12	3
Belarus	4	0	4
Ukraine	3	2	1
Ethiopia	3	1	2
Japan	1	0	1
Eritrea	1	1	0

== See also ==
- Sport in Poland
