= Svitlana Stanko-Klymenko =

Ukrainian long-distance runner

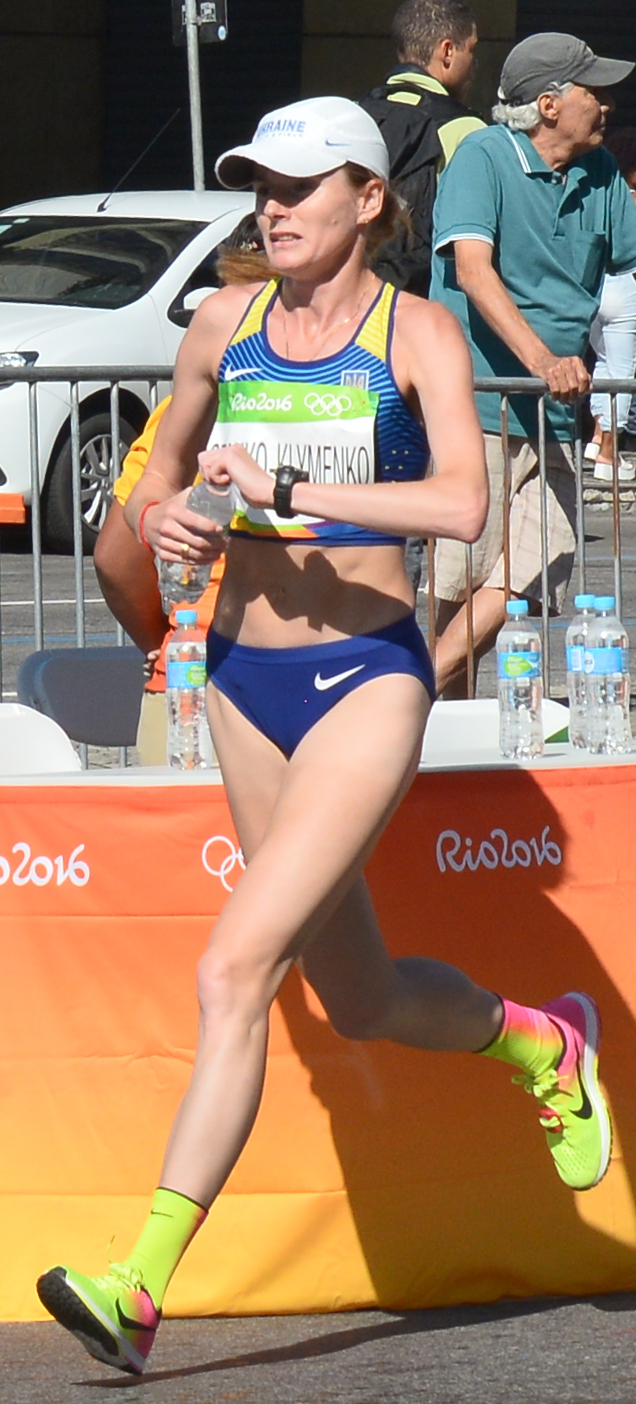
- Svitlana Stanko-Klymenko at the 2016 Summer Olympics

Personal information
- Born: 13 May 1976 (age 50)

Sport
- Sport: Track and field
- Event: Marathon

Svitlana Stanko-Klymenko (born 13 May 1976) is a Ukrainian long-distance runner who specialises in the marathon. She competed in the women's marathon event at the 2016 Summer Olympics. In April 2010 she won the Alexander the Great Marathon in Pella–Thessaloniki, Greece.
