= Singapore Marathon =

Marathon held in Singapore

- Date: First Sunday of December
- Location: Singapore
- Event type: Road
- Distance: Marathon, Half marathon, 10K run, 5K run
- Primary sponsor: BYD
- Established: 1982
- Course records: Men: 2:11:25 (2009) (Kenya) Luke Kibet; Women: 2:28:54 (2019) (Kenya) Priscah Cherono
- Website: Official website
- Participants: 55,000 (2025)

The Singapore Marathon, or BYD Singapore International Marathon for sponsorship reasons, is an annual international marathon race which is held on the first Sunday of December in the city of Singapore. It is a World Athletics Gold Label Road Race.

== History ==
The first competitive marathon in Singapore was held on 5 December 1982, with an estimated participation size of 15,000 runners. Only the 2,300 competitive runners would have to register while the non-competitive runners could participate freely as joggers along the route.

In 2002, a sponsorship deal with Standard Chartered saw the Singapore Marathon rebranded as the Standard Chartered Singapore Marathon.

In 2011, 22-year-old Malcolm Sng died after running the half-marathon. He suffered from a heart condition and died from acute coronary insufficiency. In 2012, the race gained its World Athletics Gold status.

In 2013, the marathon was organised by Ironman Asia. In the half marathon, 29-year-old John Gibson, a Briton living in Hong Kong, died after collapsing 1km away from the finish line at the Padang.

In 2017, Singapore was announced as a candidate city for the Abbott World Marathon Majors, a series of the six largest and most renowned marathons in the world. In 2019, the full- and half-marathons were held in the evening in order to fulfill criteria to be listed in the Abbott World Marathon Majors, instead of the usual flag off timing at dawn. This led to a series of road closures which resulted in 3-hour long traffic jams around the city center on the race day itself as there were other major activities happening at the same time in the vicinity of the race, leading to a public outcry of unhappiness. Lim Teck Yin, chief executive of national sports agency Sport Singapore, wrote a public letter of apology in the aftermath. During Parliament, Members of Parliament Lee Bee Wah, Liang Eng Hwa and Desmond Choo raised questions on how to avoid such issues in the future.

In 2020, Singapore Marathon moved its race event to a virtual format due to the advisories surrounding the COVID-19 pandemic. The virtual race format, titled "Standard Chartered Singapore Marathon (SCSM) Virtual Racing Series" is part of the SCSM Virtual Club initiative. Two new virtual races are made available each week for participation by runners all over the world.

In 2021, Singapore Marathon returned to in-person participation, with 4000 runners joining the event.

In 2025, it had a cap of 55,000 runners. After the race, Sport Singapore announced that Ironman Asia was replaced by SG Marathon Pte Ltd with a two-year extendable contract as Ironman's decade-long event management contract ended.

In 2026, BYD became the new title sponsor of the Singapore Marathon with the marathon now titled as BYD Singapore International Marathon.

== Race ==
There are four separate categories of competition: the full marathon, the half marathon, the 10 kilometres run, and the 5 kilometres run. Furthermore, in 2024, there is a marathon relay race for teams of 5, as well as a number of short running competitions for children.

Prize money for the full marathon race is divided into three categories: the open prize (for all competitors), the Singapore prize (open to national competitors), and the veteran prize (which acts as a masters competition).

Between 2004 and 2008, it was part of "The Greatest Race on Earth" series of road races, sponsored by Standard Chartered Singapore (the other three legs being the Hong Kong Marathon, Mumbai Marathon and Nairobi Marathon).

The times recorded at the Singapore Marathon tend to be slower than those at other marathons as Singapore's climate is unusually hot and humid. Kenyans Luke Kibet and Salina Kosgei are the men's and women's course record holders, respectively. The 2006 edition also acted as the country's national championships, with Elangovan Ganesan and Vivian Tan Yoke Pin taking the honours.

== List of winners ==
Key: Course record Singapore championship race

Year	Men's winner	Nationality	Time (h:m:s)	Women's winner	Nationality	Time (h:m:s)	Ref
1982	Raymond Crabb	England	2:24:19	Winnie Ng	Hong Kong	2:55:11	
1984	Tommy Persson	Sweden	2:18:30	Kersti Jakobsen	Denmark	2:41:34	
1986	Alain Lazare	France	2:19:04	Kersti Jakobsen	Denmark	2:39:03	
1988	Hans Pfisterer	West Germany	2:22:49	Li Yemei	China	2:46:04	
1989	Ricky Khoo	Singapore	2:39:09	Toh-So Liang	Singapore	2:53:09	
1990	Kuruppu Karunaratne	Sri Lanka	2:21:10	Li Yemei	China	2:47:47	
1991	Tikaram Gurung	Nepal	2:42:02	Yvonne Danson	England	2:47:27	
1992	Gareth Spring	England	2:22:22	Yvonne Danson	England	2:43:34	
1993	Tan-Choon Ghee	Singapore	2:42:22	Irene Chua	Singapore	3:23:18	
1994	Robert Nolan	Australia	2:22:40	Mieke Pullen	Netherlands	2:50:38	
1995	Somkert Winthochai	Thailand	2:35:39	Yoki Chow	Singapore	3:20:19	
1996	Tor-Erik Nyquist	Norway	2:24:17	Sylvia Rose	Australia	2:48:19	
1997	Tsutomu Sassa	Japan	2:28:08	Ruwiyati	Indonesia	2:49:54	
1998	Zacharia Mosala	South Africa	2:27:27	Jing Lu	China	2:59:58	
1999	Ernest Wong	Singapore	2:48:43	Ruwiyati	Indonesia	2:54:53	
2000	Nixon Nkodima	South Africa	2:27:07	Ruwiyati	Indonesia	2:53:11	
2001	Tadesse Hailemariam	Ethiopia	2:23:02	Workenesh Tola	Ethiopia	2:53:29	
2002	Joseph Riri	Kenya	2:18:46	Constantina Tomescu	Romania	2:36:06	
2003	John Kelai	Kenya	2:19:02	Yu-xi Wang	China	2:43:57	
2004	Philip Tanui	Kenya	2:17:02	Helen Cherono	Kenya	2:39:37	
2005	Amos Matui	Kenya	2:15:57	Irina Timofeyeva	Russia	2:34:42	
2006	Amos Matui	Kenya	2:15:01	Salina Kosgei	Kenya	2:31:55	
2007	Elijah Mbogo	Kenya	2:14:22	Alem Ashebier	Ethiopia	2:37:08	
2008	Luke Kibet	Kenya	2:13:01	Edith Masai	Kenya	2:34:15	
2009	Luke Kibet	Kenya	2:11:25	Albina Ivanova	Russia	2:32:49	
2010	Kenneth Mungara	Kenya	2:14:06	Irene Kosgei	Kenya	2:35:22	
2011	Charles Kanyao	Kenya	2:14:33.75	Irene Kosgei	Kenya	2:36:42.39	
2012	Kennedy Lilan	Kenya	2:17:20.27	Irene Kosgei	Kenya	2:37:53.51	
2013	Chelimo Kipkemoi	Kenya	2:15:00	Sharon Cherop	Kenya	2:41:11.04	
2014	Kenneth Mungara	Kenya	2:16:42	Waganesh Amare	Ethiopia	2:46:54	
2015	Julius Maisei	Kenya	2:17:26	Doris Changeywo	Kenya	2:44:26	
2016	Felix Kirwa	Kenya	2:17:18	Rebecca Chesir	Kenya	2:43:04	
2017	Cosmas Kimutai	Kenya	2:22:48	Pamela Rotich	Kenya	2:38:31	
2018	Joshua Kipkorir	Kenya	2:12:18	Priscah Cherono	Kenya	2:32:11	
2019	Joshua Kipkorir	Kenya	2:19:14	Priscah Cherono	Kenya	2:28:54	
2020	Not held due to COVID-19 pandemic in Singapore						
2021	Not held due to COVID-19 pandemic in Singapore						
2022	Ezekiel Omullo	Kenya	2:20:20	Esther Macharia	Kenya	2:45:09	
2023	David Barmasai Tumo	Kenya	2:14:15	Rose Chelimo	Bahrain	2:37:19	
2024	Boniface Abel Sikowo	Uganda	2:16:12	Fantu Zewude Jifar	Ethiopia	2:39:04	

== Statistics ==
=== Winners by country ===
Country	Men's race	Women's race	Total
Kenya	21	13	34
Singapore	3	3	6
China	0	4	4
England	2	2	4
Ethiopia	1	4	5
Indonesia	0	3	3
Australia	1	1	2
Denmark	0	2	2
South Africa	2	0	2
Russia	0	2	2
France	1	0	1
Germany	1	0	1
Hong Kong	0	1	1
Japan	1	0	1
Netherlands	0	1	1
Nepal	1	0	1
Norway	1	0	1
Sri Lanka	1	0	1
Sweden	1	0	1
Romania	0	1	1
Thailand	1	0	1
Bahrain	0	1	1

=== Multiple winners ===
Athlete	Country	Wins	Years
Ruwiyati	Indonesia	3	1997, 1999, 2000
Irene Jerotich Kosgei	Kenya	3	2010, 2011, 2012
Kersti Jakobsen	Denmark	2	1984, 1986
Li Yemei	China	2	1988, 1990
Yvonne Danson	England	2	1991, 1992
Amos Matui	Kenya	2	2005, 2006
Luke Kibet	Kenya	2	2008, 2009

== See also ==
- Sundown Marathon
