= 2020 World Athletics Label Road Races =

Road running competition series

The 2020 World Athletics Label Road Races were the thirteenth edition of the global series of road running competitions given Label status by World Athletics (formerly the IAAF). The series included a range of road events which was affected due to the growing concern about the coronavirus pandemic including the World Marathon Majors events like the Tokyo Marathon, the Boston Marathon and the London Marathon.

From the World Marathon Majors, the Tokyo Marathon was cancelled for amateur runners and was held only as an elite event on the scheduled date on 1 March. The Boston Marathon, scheduled to be held on 20 April, was postponed to 14 September, while the London Marathon scheduled for 26 April was rescheduled to 4 October.

== Races ==
- World Marathon Majors

Date	Label	Competition	Status	Venue	Country	Men's winner	Women's winner
5-Jan-20	Gold	Xiamen Marathon		Xiamen	China	Birhan Nebebew	Medina Armino
12-Jan-20	Gold	10K Valencia Ibercaja		Valencia	Spain	Rhonex Kipruto	Sheila Chepkirui
19-Jan-20	Gold	Aramco Houston Half Marathon		Houston	United States	Jemal Yimer Mekonnen	Hitomi Niiya
19-Jan-20	Gold	Chevron Houston Marathon		Houston	United States	Kelkile Wolderagay Gezahegn	Askale Merachi
19-Jan-20	Gold	Tata Mumbai Marathon		Mumbai	India	Derara Hurisa	Amane Gobena
24-Jan-20	Gold	Standard Chartered Dubai Marathon		Dubai	United Arab Emirates	Olika Adugna Bikila	Worknesh Degefa
26-Jan-20	Gold	Osaka Women's Marathon		Osaka	Japan		Mizuki Matsuda
2-Feb-20	Silver	Kagawa Marugame International Half Marathon		Marugame	Japan	Brett Robinson	Helalia Johannes
8-Feb-20	Silver	Access Bank Lagos City Marathon		Lagos	Nigeria	David Barmasai	Sharon Cherop
9-Feb-20	Bronze	SemiMarathon International de Safi	Postponed Indefinitely	Safi	Morocco		
9-Feb-20	Bronze	Buriram Marathon		Buriram	Thailand	Cornelius Kibiwott Chepkok	Immaculate Chemutai
9-Feb-20	Gold	Standard Chartered Hong Kong Marathon	Cancelled For 2020	Hong Kong	Hong Kong		
16-Feb-20	Bronze	Maratón BP Castellón		Castellón de la Plana	Spain		
16-Feb-20	Gold	XXXIV Medio Maratón Internacional Guadalajara Electrolit		Guadalajara	Mexico		
16-Feb-20	Gold	eDreams Mitja Marató de Barcelona		Barcelona	Spain	Victor Chumo	Ashete Bekere
21-Feb-20	Gold	Ras Al Khaimah Half Marathon		Ras Al Khaimah	United Arab Emirates	Kibiwott Kandie	Ababel Yeshaneh
23-Feb-20	Gold	Zurich Maratón de Sevilla		Seville	Spain	Mekuant Ayenew Gebre	Juliet Chekwel
23-Feb-20	Bronze	Napoli City Half Marathon		Naples	Italy		
1-Mar-20	Platinum	Tokyo Marathon		Tokyo	Japan		
8-Mar-20	Gold	Huawei RomaOstia Half Marathon	Cancelled For 2020	Rome	Italy		
8-Mar-20	Gold	The 75th Lake Biwa Mainichi Marathon		Ōtsu	Japan	Evans Chebet	
8-Mar-20	Platinum	Nagoya Women's Marathon		Nagoya	Japan		Mao Ichiyama
15-Mar-20	Silver	New Taipei City Wan Jin Shi Marathon	Cancelled For 2020	New Taipei City	Taiwan		
15-Mar-20	Bronze	Suzhou Jinji Lake Half Marathon	Postponed Indefinitely	Suzhou	China		
22-Mar-20	Silver	Wuxi Marathon	Postponed Indefinitely	Wuxi	China		
22-Mar-20	Platinum	Seoul Marathon	Cancelled For 2020	Seoul	South Korea		
22-Mar-20	Silver	Mersin Marathon	Postponed Indefinitely	Mersin	Turkey		
29-Mar-20	Silver	Acea Run Rome The Marathon	Cancelled For 2020	Rome	Italy		
5-Apr-20	Silver	Daegu International Marathon	Cancelled For 2020	Daegu	South Korea		
5-Apr-20	Silver	Generali Milano Marathon	Postponed Indefinitely	Milan	Italy		
5-Apr-20	Bronze	GENERALI BERLINER HALBMARATHON	Postponed Indefinitely	Berlin	Germany		
5-Apr-20	Silver	Work.ua Kyiv Half Marathon	Cancelled For 2020	Kyiv	Ukraine		
12-Apr-20	Silver	Dongfeng Renault Wuhan Marathon	Postponed Indefinitely	Wuhan	China		
12-Apr-20	Bronze	Mangyongdae Prize Marathon	Cancelled For 2020	Pyongyang	North Korea		
12-Apr-20	Bronze	Gunsan Saemangeum International Marathon (Men's)	Cancelled For 2020	Gunsan	South Korea		
19-Apr-20	Gold	Vienna City Marathon	Cancelled For 2020	Vienna	Austria		
19-Apr-20	Bronze	Enschede Marathon	Postponed Indefinitely	Enschede	Netherlands		
26-Apr-20	Gold	Yellow River Estuary International Marathon	Postponed Indefinitely	Dongying	China		
26-Apr-20	Gold	Rock 'n' Roll Madrid Maraton	Postponed Indefinitely	Madrid	Spain		
26-Apr-20	Gold	Gifu Half Marathon	Cancelled For 2020	Gifu	Japan		
26-Apr-20	Silver	HAJ Hannover Marathon	Cancelled For 2020	Hanover	Germany		
3-May-20	Gold	Volkswagen Prague Marathon	Postponed Indefinitely	Prague	Czech Republic		
10-May-20	Bronze	Harmony Geneva Marathon for UNICEF	Postponed Indefinitely	Genève	Switzerland		
17-May-20	Bronze	Copenhagen Marathon	Cancelled For 2020	Copenhagen	Denmark		
17-May-20	Silver	FNB Cape Town 12 ONERUN	Postponed Indefinitely	Cape Town	South Africa		
17-May-20	Gold	Rimi Riga Marathon	Postponed Indefinitely	Riga	Latvia		
23-May-20	Silver	Okpekpe Intn'l 10 km Road Race	Cancelled For 2020	Okpekpe	Nigeria		
23-May-20	Silver	PZU Warsaw Half Marathon	Postponed Indefinitely	Warsaw	Poland		
24-May-20	Gold	Scotiabank Ottawa Marathon	Cancelled For 2020	Ottawa	Canada		
31-May-20	Silver	Dalian International Marathon	Postponed Indefinitely	Dalian	China		
12-Jun-20	Bronze	Heineken 0.0 Karlovački cener		Karlovac	Croatia		
14-Jun-20	Gold	Bank of Lanzhou Cup Lanzhou International Marathon		Lanzhou	China		
21-Jun-20	Bronze	Le 10 km de Port Gentil		Port-Gentil	Gabon		
21-Jun-20	Bronze	Jilin City International Marathon	Postponed Indefinitely	Jilin	China		
27-Jun-20	Bronze	Vidovdanska Trka 10 km		Brčko	Bosnia and Herzegovina		
5-Jul-20	Gold	Village Roadshow Theme Parks Gold Coast Marathon	Cancelled for 2020	Gold Coast	Australia		
12-Jul-20	Silver	FNB Durban 10K CITYSURFRUN		Durban	South Africa		
25-Jul-20	Bronze	Nelson Mandela Bay Half Marathon		Port Elizabeth	South Africa		
26-Jul-20	Platinum	media maratón de Bogotá	Cancelled for 2020	Bogotá	Colombia		
26-Jul-20	Bronze	Giro Podistico di Castelbuono	Cancelled for 2020	Castelbuono	Italy		
16-Aug-20	Bronze	Meia Maratona Internacional do Rio de Janeiro		Rio de Janeiro	Brazil		
23-Aug-20	Bronze	21K Buenos Aires	Cancelled for 2020	Buenos Aires	Argentina		
30-Aug-20	Gold	Telcel Mexico City Marathon	Cancelled for 2020	Mexico City	Mexico		
30-Aug-20	Bronze	Harbin International Marathon		Harbin	China		
30-Aug-20	Bronze	Maybank Marathon Bali		Bali	Indonesia		
5-Sep-20	Gold	Birell Prague Grand Prix	Cancelled for 2020	Prague	Czech Republic		
5-Sep-20	Bronze	Asics Stockholm Marathon	Cancelled for 2020	Stockholm	Sweden		
6-Sep-20	Bronze	Astana Marathon	Cancelled for 2020	Nur-Sultan	Kazakhstan		
6-Sep-20	Bronze	Yingkou Bayuquan Marathon		Yingkou	China		
6-Sep-20	Gold	EDP Meia Maratona de Lisboa	Cancelled for 2020	Lisbon	Portugal		
6-Sep-20	Gold	Sportisimo Prague Half Marathon	Cancelled for 2020	Prague	Czech Republic		
6-Sep-20	Bronze	Volkswagen Bucharest Half Marathon		Bucharest	Romania		
12-Sep-20	Bronze	Tallinn Half Marathon	Cancelled for 2020	Tallinn	Estonia		
13-Sep-20	Bronze	Tallinn Marathon	Cancelled for 2020	Tallinn	Estonia		
13-Sep-20	Gold	Copenhagen Half Marathon	Cancelled for 2020	Copenhagen	Denmark		
13-Sep-20	Silver	Minsk Half Marathon	Cancelled for 2020	Minsk	Belarus		
13-Sep-20	Gold	Haspa Marathon Hamburg	Cancelled for 2020	Hamburg	Germany		
13-Sep-20	Gold	TCS World 10K Bengaluru		Bengaluru	India		
14-Sep-20	Platinum	B.A.A. Boston Marathon		Boston	United States		
19-Sep-20	Gold	Sydney Running Festival / Sydney Marathon	Cancelled for 2020	Sydney	Australia		
20-Sep-20	Bronze	Maratón de Buenos Aires Ñandú	Cancelled for 2020	Buenos Aires	Argentina		
20-Sep-20	Bronze	Hyundai Porto Half Marathon	Cancelled for 2020	Porto	Portugal		
20-Sep-20	Gold	Taiyuan International Marathon		Taiyuan	China		
20-Sep-20	Gold	Hengshui Lake International Marathon		Hengshui	China		
20-Sep-20	Gold	Vodafone Istanbul Half Marathon	Cancelled for 2020	Istanbul	Turkey		
24-Sep-20	Bronze	FNB Joburg 10K CITYRUN		Johannesburg	South Africa		
26-Sep-20	Silver	15K Nocturna Valencia Banco Mediolanum		Valencia	Spain		
27-Sep-20	Platinum	BMW BERLIN MARATHON		Berlin	Germany		
27-Sep-20	Bronze	20 km International de Marrakech		Marrakesh	Morocco		
27-Sep-20	Bronze	PZU Warsaw Marathon	Cancelled for 2020	Warsaw	Poland		
27-Sep-20	Bronze	Bangsaen 10		Chonburi	Thailand		
4-Oct-20	Gold	Cardiff University / Cardiff Half Marathon	Cancelled for 2020	Cardiff	Wales		
4-Oct-20	Bronze	Telesia Half Marathon		Telese Terme	Italy		
4-Oct-20	Bronze	Amgen Singelloop Breda		Breda	Netherlands		
4-Oct-20	Silver	Košice Peace Marathon	Cancelled for 2020	Košice	Slovakia		
4-Oct-20	Platinum	Virgin Money London Marathon		London	England		
4-Oct-20	Silver	Movistar Medio Maratón de Madrid	Cancelled for 2020	Madrid	Spain		
11-Oct-20	Bronze	Wizz Air Sofia Marathon	Cancelled for 2020	Sofia	Bulgaria		
11-Oct-20	Bronze	Zagreb Marathon	Cancelled for 2020	Zagreb	Croatia		
11-Oct-20	Bronze	Generali München Marathon	Cancelled for 2020	Munich	Germany		
11-Oct-20	Bronze	Raiffeisen Bank Bucharest Marathon	Cancelled for 2020	Bucharest	Romania		
11-Oct-20	Platinum	Bank of America Chicago Marathon		Chicago	United States		
11-Oct-20	Silver	Les 20 km de Paris	Cancelled for 2020	Paris	France		
11-Oct-20	Silver	EDP Maratona de Lisboa	Cancelled for 2020	Lisbon	Portugal		
11-Oct-20	Gold	Luso Meia Maratona	Cancelled for 2020	Lisbon	Portugal		
11-Oct-20	Silver	Changzhou West Taihu Lake Half Marathon		Changzhou	China		
11-Oct-20	Bronze	Maratona da Cidade do Rio de Janeiro	Cancelled for 2020	Rio de Janeiro	Brazil		
18-Oct-20	Gold	Sanlam Cape Town Marathon	Cancelled for 2020	Cape Town	South Africa		
18-Oct-20	Bronze	Cracovia Royal Half Marathon		Kraków	Poland		
18-Oct-20	Gold	Airtel Delhi Half Marathon		New Delhi	India	Amdework Walelegn	Yalemzerf Yehualaw
18-Oct-20	Platinum	TCS Amsterdam Marathon	Cancelled for 2020	Amsterdam	Netherlands		
18-Oct-20	Gold	Scotiabank Toronto Waterfront Marathon	Cancelled for 2020	Toronto	Canada		
18-Oct-20	Gold	Schneider Electric Marathon de Paris	Cancelled for 2020	Paris	France		
18-Oct-20	Bronze	Chizhou Marathon		Chizhou	China		
18-Oct-20	Bronze	Shanghai International Elite 10K Race		Shanghai	China		
25-Oct-20	Gold	Mainova Frankfurt Marathon	Cancelled for 2020	Frankfurt	Germany		
25-Oct-20	Bronze	Huawei Venice Marathon	Cancelled for 2020	Venice	Italy		
25-Oct-20	Gold	Volkswagen Ljubljana Marathon	Cancelled for 2020	Ljubljana	Slovenia		
25-Oct-20	Gold	Medio Maratón Valencia Trinidad Alfonso EDP	Cancelled for 2020	Valencia	Spain		
25-Oct-20	Silver	Changsha International Marathon		Changsha	China		
25-Oct-20	Silver	Zurich Marató Barcelona	Cancelled for 2020	Barcelona	Spain		
25-Oct-20	Gold	NN Marathon Rotterdam	Cancelled for 2020	Rotterdam	Spain		
1-Nov-20	Gold	Hangzhou Marathon		Hangzhou	China	Su Guoxiong	Wang Min
1-Nov-20	Platinum	TCS New York City Marathon		New York City	United States		
1-Nov-20	Bronze	Yichang International Marathon		Yichang	China		
1-Nov-20	Silver	Maratón Internacional Megacable Guadalajara		Guadalajara	Mexico		
1-Nov-20	Gold	Chongqing International Marathon		Chongqing	China		
2-Nov-20	Bronze	Maratona de São Paulo		São Paulo	Brazil		
7-Nov-20	Bronze	Xichang Qionghai Lake Wetland International Marathon		Xichang	China		
8-Nov-20	Bronze	Maratona do Porto EDP	Cancelled for 2020	Porto	Portugal		
8-Nov-20	Gold	Istanbul Marathon		Istanbul	Turkey	Benard Cheruiyot Sang	Diana Kipyogei
8-Nov-20	Silver	BLOM BANK Beirut Marathon	Cancelled for 2020	Beirut	Lebanon		
8-Nov-20	Gold	Hefei International Marathon		Hefei	China		
8-Nov-20	Silver	Nanjing Marathon		Nanjing	China	Peng Jianhua	Li Dan
8-Nov-20	Bronze	Bangsaen42 Chonburi Marathon		Chonburi	Thailand		
8-Nov-20	Bronze	Chongqing Women's Half Marathon		Chongqing	China		
8-Nov-20	Silver	PZU Cracovia Marathon	Cancelled for 2020	Kraków	Poland		
8-Nov-20	Gold	Yangzhou Jianzhen International Half Marathon	Cancelled for 2020	Yangzhou	China		
14-Nov-20	Bronze	Gulf Bank 642 Marathon		Kuwait City	Kuwait		
15-Nov-20	Silver	Kobe Marathon	Cancelled for 2020	Kobe	Japan		
15-Nov-20	Silver	Nanchang International Marathon		Nanchang	China		
15-Nov-20	Bronze	Guilin Marathon		Guilin	China		
22-Nov-20	Bronze	Semi Marathon de Boulogne Billancourt Christian Granger	Cancelled for 2020	Boulogne-Billancourt	France		
29-Nov-20	Bronze	Asics Firenze Marathon	Cancelled for 2020	Florence	Italy		
29-Nov-20	Bronze	Osaka Marathon	Cancelled for 2020	Osaka	Japan		
29-Nov-20	Bronze	Marathon du Gabon GSEZ		Libreville	Gabon		
29-Nov-20	Platinum	Shanghai International Marathon		Shanghai	China	Renjia Jia’e	Li Zhixuan
5-Dec-20	Gold	Standard Chartered Singapore Marathon	Cancelled for 2020	Singapore	Singapore		
6-Dec-20	Gold	The 74th Fukuoka International Open Marathon Championships		Fukuoka	Japan	Yuya Yoshida	
6-Dec-20	Silver	SCO Kunming International Marathon		Kunming	China		
6-Dec-20	Platinum	Maratón Valencia Trinidad Alfonso EDP		Valencia	Spain	Evans Chebet	Peres Jepchirchir
6-Dec-20	Bronze	Marathon COMAR de la ville de Tunis		Tunis	Tunisia		
11-Dec-20	Bronze	ADNOC Abu Dhabi Marathon	Cancelled for 2020	Abu Dhabi	United Arab Emirates		
13-Dec-20	Gold	Guangzhou Marathon	Cancelled for 2020	Guangzhou	China	Renjia Jia’e	Ding Changqin
13-Dec-20	Bronze	Zurich Maratón Málaga	Cancelled for 2020	Málaga	Spain		
13-Dec-20	Bronze	Shanghai International Half Marathon		Shanghai	China		
20-Dec-20	Bronze	Taipei Marathon		Taipei City	Taiwan	Paul Lonyangata	Askale Merachi Wegi
20-Dec-20	Silver	Tata Steel Kolkata 25K		Kolkata	India		
20-Dec-20	Gold	Shenzhen Marathon		Shenzhen	China		
20-Dec-20	Gold	Bangsaen21 Half Marathon		Chonburi	Thailand	Nattawut Innum	Linda Janthachit
27-Dec-20	Silver	Corrida Pédestre Internationale de Houilles	Cancelled for 2020	Houilles	France		
27-Dec-20	Bronze	Shantou Marathon		Shantou	China		
31-Dec-20	Bronze	Corrida Internacional de São Silvestre	Cancelled for 2020	São Paulo	Brazil		
31-Dec-20	Bronze	BOclassic Südtirol		Bolzano	Italy	Dorcas Jeptoo Tuitoek	Margaret Kipkemboi Chelimo
31-Dec-20	Gold	Nationale Nederlanden San Silvestre Vallecana	Cancelled for 2020	Madrid	Spain	Daniel Simiu Ebenyo	Yalemzerf Yehualaw Densa
