= List of winners of the Rotterdam Marathon =

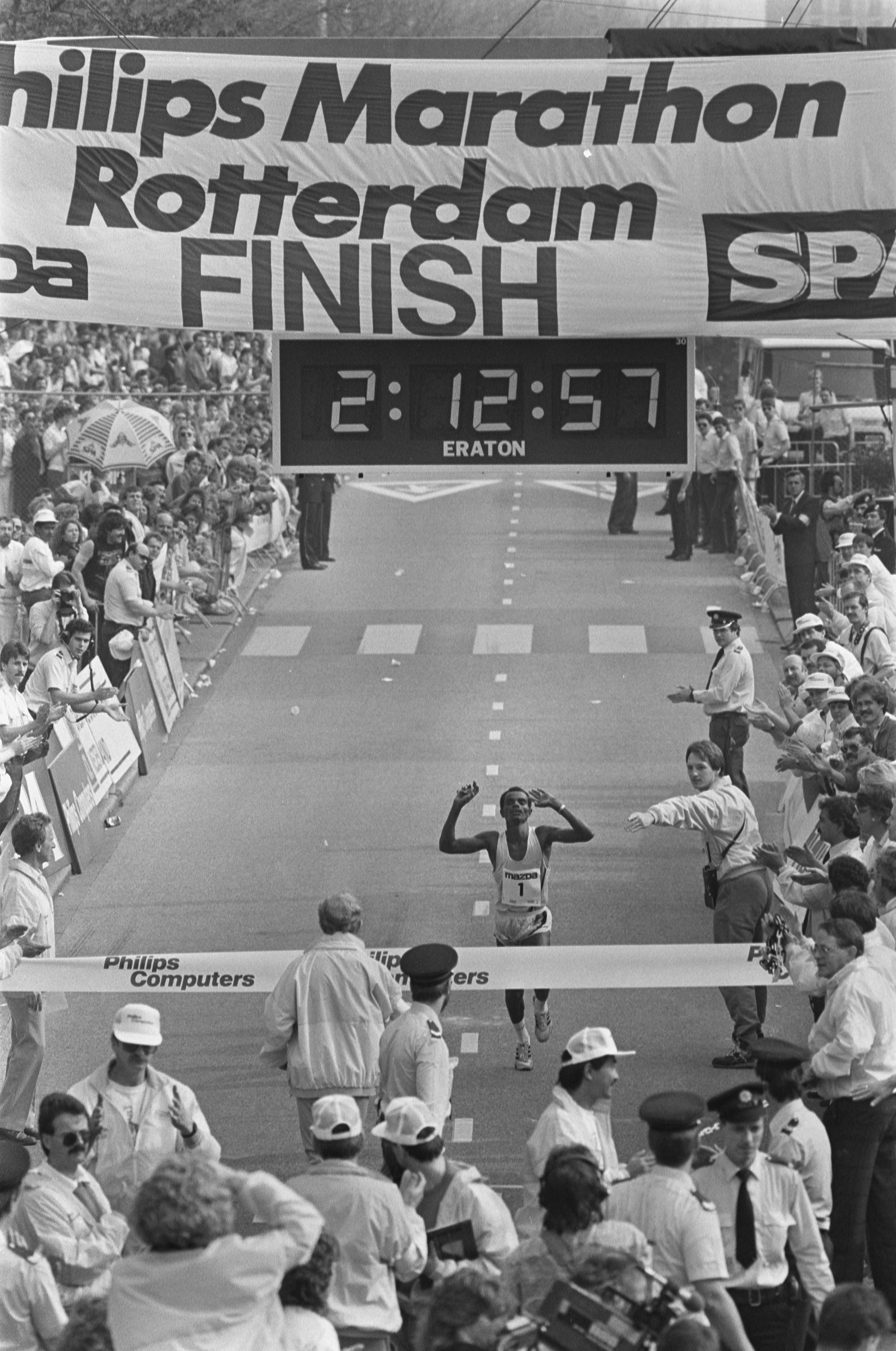
Belayneh Dinsamo at the finish line of the 1987 race. He has the most victories in this marathon winning in 1987, 1988, 1989, and 1996.

The Rotterdam Marathon is a road race of 42.195 km (26 mi 385 yd) across the city of Rotterdam that has been contested by men and women annually since 1981. This marathon is usually held in April, except the first two editions were held in May and, due to the COVID-19 pandemic, the 2020 race was cancelled and the 2021 race was postponed to October.

In the inaugural race of 1981, John Graham was the first male winner in a time of 2:09:28 (h:m:s) and Marja Wokke was the first female winner in 2:43:23. Three times, a marathon world record (WR) was set in Rotterdam. In 1985, Carlos Lopes set a men's world record of 2:07:12. Two years later, Belayneh Dinsamo improved the men's world record to 2:06:50. And in 1998, Tegla Laroupe set a women's world record of 2:20:47 in the race. The current course record (CR) for men is 2:03:36 set by Bashir Abdi in 2021 and for women 2:18:58 set by Tiki Gelana in 2012.

Dinsamo has won the Rotterdam Marathon four times in 1987, 1988, 1989, and 1996, which are the most victories by one runner. Laroupe won three times in 1997–1999. And Robert de Castella (1983/1991), Carla Beurskens (1984/1990), Marius Kipserem (2016/2019), Bashir Abdi (2021/2023), and Abdi Nageeye (2022/2024) each won twice.

Most victories are from runners representing Kenya, Ethiopia, and the host country the Netherlands. In the women's category, the Kenyans had ten victories, the Ethiopans nine, and the Dutch seven. In the men's category, the victory numbers vary more: nineteen victories for Kenya, eight for Ethiopia and two for the Netherlands.

== Men's winners ==
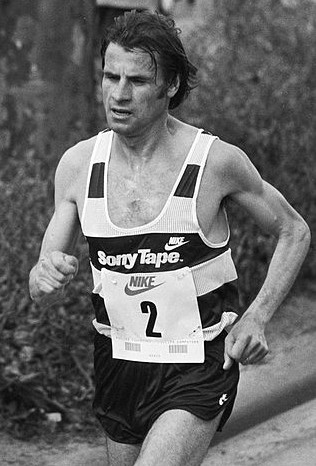
Carlos Lopes during his 1985 race, where he set a world record.

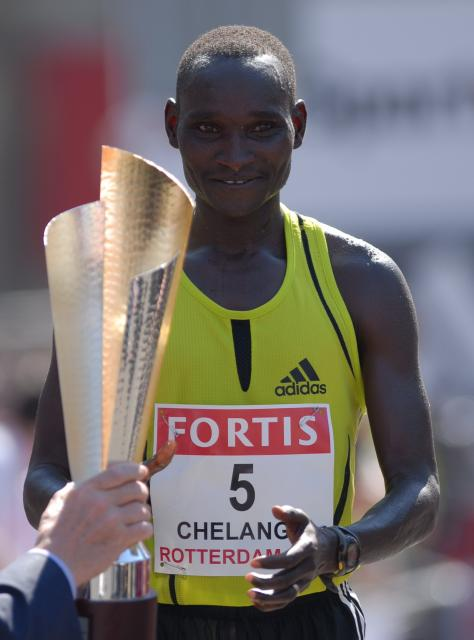
Joshua Chelanga receives the trophy after winning the 2007 marathon.

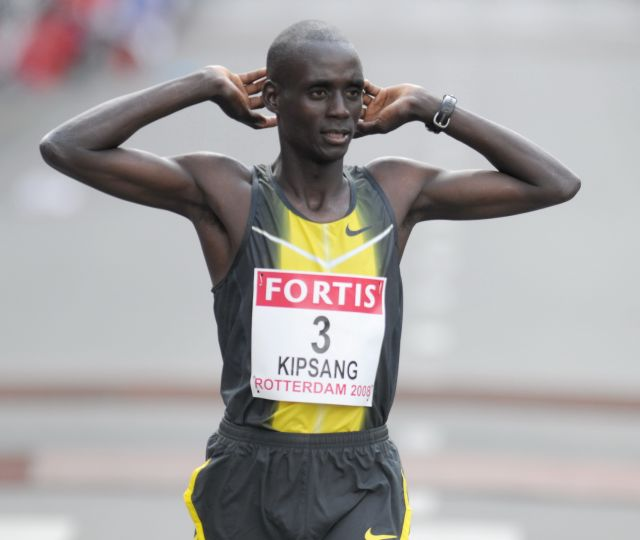
William Kipsang after winning the 2008 marathon

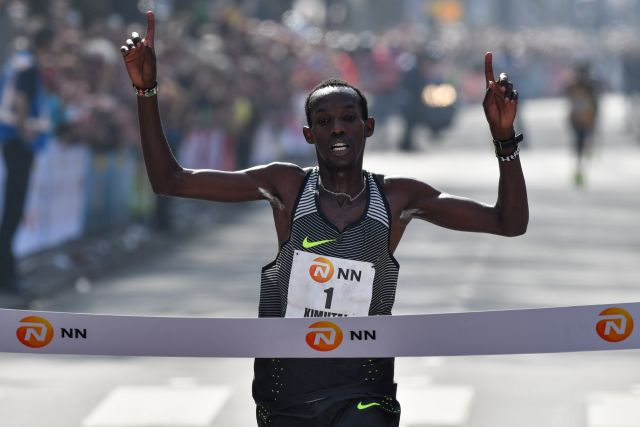
Marius Kimutai winning the 2017 edition

Men's winners of the Rotterdam Marathon
| Date | Athlete | Country | Time | Note | Ref. |
|---|---|---|---|---|---|
| 23 May 1981 | John Graham | Scotland | 2:09:28 | CR | |
| 22 May 1982 | Rodolfo Gómez | Mexico | 2:11:57 | | |
| 9 April 1983 | Robert de Castella | Australia | 2:08:37 | CR | |
| 14 April 1984 | Gidamis Shahanga | Tanzania | 2:11:12 | | |
| 20 April 1985 | Carlos Lopes | Portugal | 2:07:12 | WR | |
| 19 April 1986 | Abebe Mekonnen | Ethiopia | 2:09:08 | | |
| 18 April 1987 | Belayneh Dinsamo | Ethiopia | 2:12:58 | | |
| 17 April 1988 | Belayneh Dinsamo | Ethiopia | 2:06:50 | WR | |
| 16 April 1989 | Belayneh Dinsamo | Ethiopia | 2:08:39 | | |
| 22 April 1990 | Hiromi Taniguchi | Japan | 2:10:56 | | |
| 21 April 1991 | Robert de Castella | Australia | 2:09:42 | | |
| 5 April 1992 | Salvador García | Mexico | 2:09:16 | | |
| 18 April 1993 | Dionicio Cerón | Mexico | 2:11:06 | | |
| 17 April 1994 | Vincent Rousseau | Belgium | 2:07:51 | | |
| 23 April 1995 | Martín Fiz | Spain | 2:08:57 | | |
| 28 April 1996 | Belayneh Dinsamo | Ethiopia | 2:10:30 | | |
| 20 April 1997 | Domingos Castro | Portugal | 2:07:51 | | |
| 19 April 1998 | Fabián Roncero | Spain | 2:07:26 | | |
| 18 April 1999 | Japhet Kosgei | Kenya | 2:07:09 | | |
| 16 April 2000 | Kenneth Cheruiyot | Kenya | 2:08:22 | | |
| 22 April 2001 | Josephat Kiprono | Kenya | 2:06:50 | =CR (Note: The time of 2:06:50 equaled the course record of Belayneh Dinsamo from 1988.) | |
| 21 April 2002 | Simon Biwott | Kenya | 2:08:36 | | |
| 13 April 2003 | William Kiplagat | Kenya | 2:07:42 | | |
| 4 April 2004 | Felix Limo | Kenya | 2:06:14 | CR | |
| 10 April 2005 | Jimmy Muindi | Kenya | 2:07:50 | | |
| 9 April 2006 | Sammy Korir | Kenya | 2:06:38 | | |
| 15 April 2007 | Joshua Chelanga | Kenya | 2:08:21 | | |
| 13 April 2008 | William Kipsang | Kenya | 2:05:49 | CR | |
| 5 April 2009 | Duncan Kibet | Kenya | 2:04:27 | CR | |
| 11 April 2010 | Patrick Makau | Kenya | 2:04:48 | | |
| 10 April 2011 | Wilson Chebet | Kenya | 2:05:27 | | |
| 15 April 2012 | Yemane Tsegay | Ethiopia | 2:04:48 | | |
| 14 April 2013 | Tilahun Regassa | Ethiopia | 2:05:38 | | |
| 13 April 2014 | Eliud Kipchoge | Kenya | 2:05:00 | | |
| 12 April 2015 | Abera Kuma | Ethiopia | 2:06:47 | | |
| 10 April 2016 | Marius Kipserem | Kenya | 2:06:11 | | |
| 9 April 2017 | Marius Kimutai | Kenya | 2:06:04 | | |
| 8 April 2018 | Kenneth Kipkemoi | Kenya | 2:05:44 | | |
| 7 April 2019 | Marius Kipserem | Kenya | 2:04:11 | CR | |
| 5 April 2020 | Marathon cancelled (Note: The marathon was cancelled due to the COVID-19 pandemic.) | | | | |
| 24 October 2021 | Bashir Abdi | Belgium | 2:03:36 | CR | |
| 10 April 2022 | Abdi Nageeye | Netherlands | 2:04:56 | | |
| 16 April 2023 | Bashir Abdi | Belgium | 2:03:47 | | |
| 14 April 2024 | Abdi Nageeye | Netherlands | 2:04:45 | | |
| 13 April 2025 | Geoffrey Kamworor | Kenya | 2:04:34 | | |
| 12 April 2026 | Guye Adola | Ethiopia | 2:03:54 | | |

== Women's winners ==
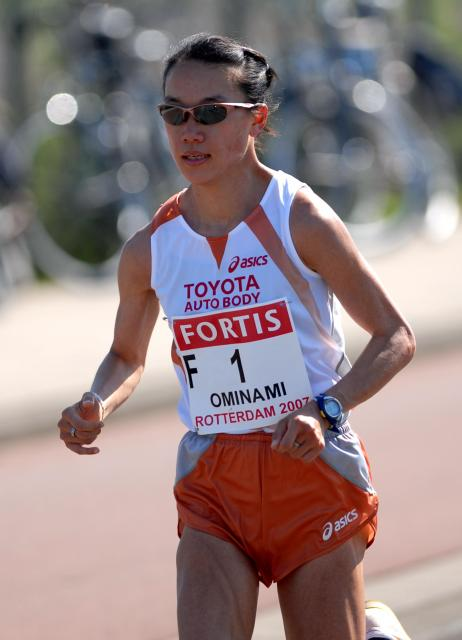
Hiromi Ominami during her winning race in 2007

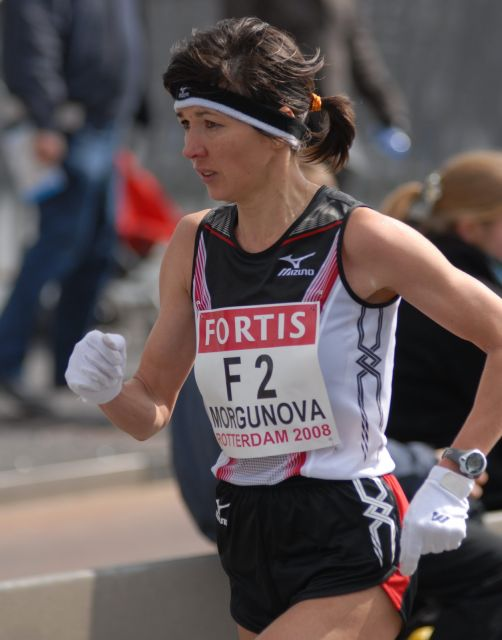
Lyubov Morgunova during her winning race in 2008

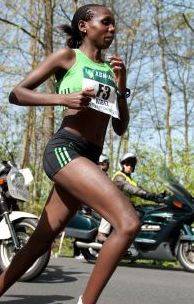
Philes Ongori during her winning race in 2011

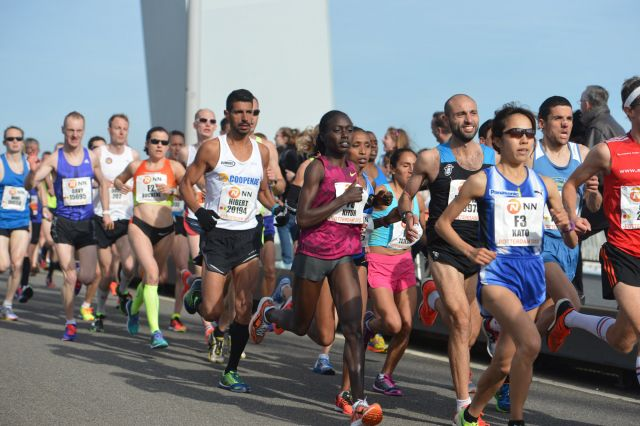
Asami Kato (front right) during her winning race in 2015

Women's winners of the Rotterdam Marathon
| Date | Athlete | Country | Time | Note | Ref. |
|---|---|---|---|---|---|
| 23 May 1981 | Marja Wokke | Netherlands | 2:43:23 | CR | |
| 22 May 1982 | Mathilde Heuing | West Germany | 2:54:03 | | |
| 9 April 1983 | Rosa Mota | Portugal | 2:32:27 | CR | |
| 14 April 1984 | Carla Beurskens | Netherlands | 2:34:56 | | |
| 20 April 1985 | Wilma Rusman | Netherlands | 2:35:32 | | |
| 19 April 1986 | Ellinor Ljungros | Sweden | 2:41:06 | | |
| 18 April 1987 | Nelly Aerts | Belgium | 2:41:24 | | |
| 17 April 1988 | Xiao Hongyan | China | 2:37:46 | | |
| 16 April 1989 | Elena Murgoci | Romania | 2:32:03 | CR | |
| 22 April 1990 | Carla Beurskens | Netherlands | 2:29:47 | CR | |
| 21 April 1991 | Joke Kleijweg | Netherlands | 2:34:18 | | |
| 5 April 1992 | Aurora Cunha | Portugal | 2:29:14 | CR | |
| 18 April 1993 | Anne van Schuppen | Netherlands | 2:34:15 | | |
| 17 April 1994 | Miyoko Asahina | Japan | 2:25:52 | CR | |
| 23 April 1995 | Mónica Pont | Spain | 2:30:34 | | |
| 28 April 1996 | Lieve Slegers | Belgium | 2:28:06 | | |
| 20 April 1997 | Tegla Laroupe | Kenya | 2:22:07 | CR | |
| 19 April 1998 | Tegla Laroupe | Kenya | 2:20:47 | WR | |
| 18 April 1999 | Tegla Laroupe | Kenya | 2:22:48 | | |
| 16 April 2000 | Ana Isabel Alonso | Spain | 2:30:21 | | |
| 22 April 2001 | Susan Chepkemei | Kenya | 2:25:45 | | |
| 21 April 2002 | Takami Ominami | Japan | 2:23:43 | | |
| 13 April 2003 | Olivera Jevtić | Serbia and Montenegro | 2:25:23 | | |
| 4 April 2004 | Zhor El Kamch | Morocco | 2:26:10 | | |
| 10 April 2005 | Lornah Kiplagat | Netherlands | 2:27:36 | | |
| 9 April 2006 | Gishu Mindaye | Ethiopia | 2:28:30 | | |
| 15 April 2007 | Hiromi Ominami | Japan | 2:26:36 | | |
| 13 April 2008 | Lyubov Morgunova | Russia | 2:25:10 | | |
| 5 April 2009 | Nailiya Yulamanova | Russia | 2:26:30 | | |
| 11 April 2010 | Aberu Kebede | Ethiopia | 2:25:25 | | |
| 10 April 2011 | Philes Ongori | Kenya | 2:24:20 | | |
| 15 April 2012 | Tiki Gelana | Ethiopia | 2:18:58 | CR | |
| 14 April 2013 | Jemima Sumgong | Kenya | 2:23:27 | | |
| 13 April 2014 | Abebech Afework | Ethiopia | 2:27:50 | | |
| 12 April 2015 | Asami Kato | Japan | 2:26:30 | | |
| 10 April 2016 | Letebrhan Haylay | Ethiopia | 2:26:15 | | |
| 9 April 2017 | Meskerem Assefa | Ethiopia | 2:24:18 | | |
| 8 April 2018 | Visiline Jepkesho | Kenya | 2:23:47 | | |
| 7 April 2019 | Ashete Bekere | Ethiopia | 2:22:55 | | |
| 5 April 2020 | Marathon cancelled | | | | |
| 24 October 2021 | Stella Barsosio | Kenya | 2:22:08 | | |
| 10 April 2022 | Haven Hailu | Ethiopia | 2:22:01 | | |
| 16 April 2023 | Eunice Chumba | Kenya | 2:20:31 | | |
| 14 April 2024 | Ashete Bekere | Ethiopia | 2:19:30 | | |
| 13 April 2025 | Jackline Cherono | Kenya | 2:21:15 | | |
| 12 April 2026 | Mekides Shimeles | Ethiopia | 2:18:56 | CR | |

== Victories by country ==
Number of victories by country
| Country | Men | Women | Total |
|---|---|---|---|
| Kenya | 19 | 10 | 29 |
| Ethiopia | 9 | 10 | 19 |
| Netherlands | 2 | 7 | 9 |
| Belgium | 3 | 2 | 5 |
| Japan | 1 | 4 | 5 |
| Portugal | 2 | 2 | 4 |
| Spain | 2 | 2 | 4 |
| Mexico | 3 | 0 | 3 |
| Australia | 2 | 0 | 2 |
| Russia | 0 | 2 | 2 |
| China | 0 | 1 | 1 |
| Morocco | 0 | 1 | 1 |
| Romania | 0 | 1 | 1 |
| Scotland | 1 | 0 | 1 |
| Serbia and Montenegro | 0 | 1 | 1 |
| Sweden | 0 | 1 | 1 |
| Tanzania | 1 | 0 | 1 |
| West Germany | 0 | 1 | 1 |
Updated for the 2026 edition
