= Volta à cidade do Funchal =

Annual night road race

- Date: around Saint Silvester's Day on December 31
- Location: Funchal, Madeira, Portugal
- Event type: Road
- Distance: 5 kilometres (men & women)
- Established: 1958
- Website: www.voltacidade.com

The Volta à cidade do Funchal (Tour of the city of Funchal in English) is an annual night road race of about 6 km which is celebrated around Saint Silvester's Day on December 31 in Funchal, Madeira since 1958, making it the oldest Saint Silvester Road Race in Portugal and one of the oldest in Europe.

It is based upon the Saint Silvester Marathon, a Brazilian race (held since 1925) which spawned numerous other New Year's Eve races. The Volta à cidade do Funchal is one of the city's foremost annual running events.

It has been organised by AARAM (Associação de Atletismo da Região Autónoma da Madeira) since 1997.

== Past winners ==
Edition	Year	Men's winner	Country	Women's winner	Country
1st	1958	Juvenal Freitas	Portugal	Not held	
2nd	1959	Dias Santos	Portugal	Not held	
3rd	1960	João de Freitas	Portugal	Not held	
4th	1961	João de Freitas	Portugal	Not held	
5th	1962	Joel Pinto	Portugal	Not held	
6th	1963	Joel Pinto	Portugal	Not held	
7th	1964	João Pinto	Portugal	Not held	
8th	1965	Joel Pinto	Portugal	Not held	
9th	1966	José Rodrigues	Portugal	Not held	
10th	1967	Joel Pinto	Portugal	Not held	
11th	1968	Alvarino Mendonça	Portugal	Not held	
12th	1969	António Timóteo	Portugal	Not held	
13th	1970	Joachim Heike	Germany	Not held	
14th	1971	Américo Barros	Portugal	Not held	
15th	1972	Banjt Nasde	Sweden	Not held	
16th	1973	Aniceto Simões	Portugal	Not held	
17th	1974	Banjt Nasde	Sweden	Not held	
18th	1975	Haven Spik	Finland	Not held	
19th	1976	Karl Fleschen	Germany	Not held	
20th	1977	Fernando Mamede	Portugal	Not held	
21st	1978	Jouni Kortelainen	Finland	Not held	
22nd	1979	Seppo Liuttu	Finland	Not held	
23rd	1980	Detlef Uhlemann	Germany	Not held	
24th	1981	Michael Spoettei	Germany	K. Hildenson	Sweden
25th	1982	Carlos Lopes	Portugal	Aurora Cunha	Portugal
26th	1983	Carlos Lopes	Portugal	Conceição Ferreira	Portugal
27th	1984	José Frias	Portugal	Sílvia Abreu	Portugal
28th	1985	José Frias	Portugal	Sílvia Abreu	Portugal
29th	1986	Nené Carreira	Portugal	Maria José Pereira	Portugal
30th	1987	José Teixeira	Portugal	Amélia Araújo	Portugal
31st	1988	José Teixeira	Portugal	Amélia Araújo	Portugal
32nd	1989	José Regalo	Portugal	Amélia Araújo	Portugal
33rd	1990	António Monteiro	Portugal	Dores Leal	Portugal
34th	1991	José Moreira	Portugal	Dores Leal	Portugal
35th	1992	Víctor Almeida	Portugal	Carla Sacramento	Portugal
36th	1993	Cândido Maia	Portugal	Ana Dias	Portugal
37th	1994	Carlos Monteiro	Portugal	Carla Sacramento	Portugal
38th	1995	Hélder Ornelas	Portugal	Lucia Subano	Kenya
39th	1996	Rui Borges	Portugal	Fernanda Marques	Portugal
40th	1997	José Regalo	Portugal	Fernanda Ribeiro	Portugal
41st	1998	Rui Silva	Portugal	Getenesh Urge	Ethiopia
42nd	1999	Rui Silva	Portugal	Jeļena Prokopčuka	Latvia
43rd	2000	Rui Silva	Portugal	Fernanda Ribeiro	Portugal
44th	2001	Rui Silva	Portugal	Fernanda Ribeiro	Portugal
45th	2002	Rui Silva	Portugal	Fernanda Ribeiro	Portugal
46th	2003	Rui Silva	Portugal	Jeļena Prokopčuka	Latvia
47th	2004	Sergey Lebid	Ukraine	Jeļena Prokopčuka	Latvia
48th	2005	Kiprono Menjo	Kenya	Fernanda Ribeiro	Portugal
49th	2006	Kiprono Menjo	Kenya	Jéssica Augusto	Portugal
50th	2007	Rui Silva	Portugal	Eunice Jepkorir	Kenya
51st	2008	Kiprono Menjo	Kenya	Jéssica Augusto	Portugal
52nd	2009	Rui Pedro Silva	Portugal	Fernanda Ribeiro	Portugal
53rd	2010	Eduardo Mbengani	Portugal	Jéssica Augusto	Portugal
54th	2011	José Rocha	Portugal	Rebecca Cheptegei	Uganda
55th	2012	José Rocha	Portugal	Nazret Weldu	Eritrea
56th	2013	Antonio Abadía	Spain	Joana Soares	Portugal
57th	2014	Carlos Nieto	Spain	Simret Restle	Germany
58th	2015	Carlos Mayo	Spain	Almensh Belete	Belgium
59th	2016	Antonio Abadía	Spain	Inês Monteiro	Portugal
60th	2017	Yemane Haileselassie	Eritrea	Inês Monteiro	Portugal
61st	2018	Antonio Abadía	Spain	Cátia Santos	Portugal
62nd	2019	Antonio Abadía	Spain	María José Pérez	Spain
