= Émerson Iser Bem =

Brazilian runner (born 1973)

Personal information
- Nationality: Brazilian
- Born: 7 July 1973 (age 52) Santo Antônio do Sudoeste, Paraná

Sport
- Country: Brazil
- Sport: Athletics
- Event(s): 5000 m, 10,000 m, half-marathon, marathon

Émerson Iser Bem (born 7 July 1973) is a Brazilian long-distance runner. He is notable for having won the 1997 edition of the Saint Silvester Road Race.

== Biography ==
Born in the countryside of Paraná state, Iser Bem began his career as a runner after suffering a fall from a horse, which caused permanent damage to one of his arms. He won the 1997 edition of the São Silvestre Race, against the then two-time champion Paul Tergat. The victory earned him a prize of approximately $11,000 USD at the time. Another significant result for Iser Bem was the third place in 1999 Tokyo International Marathon.

To this day, Iser Bem holds the Brazilian youth record for the 5,000 meters, with a time of 13"59. He retired from competitive racing in 2006 and graduated in physical education, later becoming a coach for other long-distance runners.

In 2021, Iser Bem ran the São Silvestre Race again alongside Marilson Gomes dos Santos and other amateurs.
