= Reuben Kipyego =

Kenyan long-distance runner

Reuben Kiprop Kipyego
Personal information
- Full name: Reuben Kiprop Kipyego
- Nationality: Kenyan
- Born: August 21, 1996 (age 29)

Sport
- Sport: Athletics
- Events: Marathon, Half marathon

Reuben Kiprop Kipyego (born 21 August 1996) is a Kenyan long-distance runner specializing in the marathon. He is recognized for his consistent sub-2:05 marathon performances, including a victory at the 2019 Abu Dhabi Marathon and a personal best of 2:03:55.

== Career ==
Kipyego won the 2019 Abu Dhabi Marathon in a time of 2:04:40. He had initially started the race as a pacemaker, but continued to the finish to secure the victory.

In May 2021, Kipyego achieved a personal best at the Milano Marathon, finishing second with a time of 2:03:55. This performance ranked among the fastest marathon times globally at the time. Later that year, he participated in the 2021 Bank of America Chicago Marathon, finishing eighth with a time of 2:14:24. He then secured a third-place finish at the Rotterdam Marathon in 2021, clocking 2:05:12. In 2022, he placed fourth at the Valencia Marathon with a time of 2:04:12.

Overall, Kipyego has competed in marathons across four different countries, with his officially recognized fastest time being 2:03:55.

== Doping ban ==
On 27 May 2024, the Athletics Integrity Unit (AIU) provisionally suspended Kipyego for two years due to three missed out-of-competition drug-testing whereabouts appointments within a 12-month period. These failures occurred between September 2023 and March 2024. As a result of the ban, all his competitive results from 12 March 2024 onwards have been annulled.

== Personal bests ==
According to his World Athletics profile, Kipyego's personal bests are:

- Marathon – 2:03:55 (Milano, 16 May 2021)
- Half marathon – 59:35 (Ras al-Khaimah, 19 February 2022)
