= John Graham (long-distance runner) =

Scottish long-distance runner

Personal information
- Nationality: British (Scottish)
- Born: 18 June 1956 (age 69)

Sport
- Sport: Athletics
- Event: long-distance

Jonathon Ephriam Graham (born 18 June 1956) is a former long-distance runner from Scotland.

== Biography ==
Graham won the inaugural Rotterdam Marathon on 23 May 1981 in a time of 2:09:28.

He twice finished in fourth place in the men's marathon at the Commonwealth Games (1982 and 1986).

Graham was on the podium of the AAA Championships by virtue of being the third placed British athlete past the post during the 1987 London Marathon.

== Achievements ==
Year	Competition	Venue	Position	Event	Notes
Representing Great Britain and Scotland
1980	Spanish Athletics Championships	Laredo, Spain	1st	Marathon	2:13:21
1980	Nike OTC Marathon	Eugene, Oregon	8th	Marathon	2:15:04
1980	New York City Marathon	New York City, United States	3rd	Marathon	2:11:46
1981	Rotterdam Marathon	Rotterdam, Netherlands	1st	Marathon	2:09:28
1982	AAA Gateshead Marathon	Gateshead, United Kingdom	4th	Marathon	2:15:14
1982	Commonwealth Games	Brisbane, Australia	4th	Marathon	2:13:04
1983	New York City Marathon	New York City, United States	5th	Marathon	2:10:57
1984	London Marathon	London, United Kingdom	11th	Marathon	2:14:40
1985	Rotterdam Marathon	Rotterdam, Netherlands	2nd	Marathon	2:09:58
1985	Chicago Marathon	Chicago, United States	12th	Marathon	2:12:55
1986	Rotterdam Marathon	Rotterdam, Netherlands	6th	Marathon	2:13:42
1986	Commonwealth Games	Edinburgh, Scotland	4th	Marathon	2:12:10
1987	London Marathon	London, United Kingdom	11th	Marathon	2:12:32
