= São Silvestre (film) =

2013 film directed by Lina Chamie

- Directed by: Lina Chamie
- Written by: Lina Chamie
- Produced by: Paula Cosenza; Denise Gomes
- Starring: Fernando Alves Pinto
- Cinematography: José Roberto Eliezer
- Production companies: Bossa Nova Films; Girafa Filmes
- Release date: December 27, 2013 (Brazil)
- Country: Brazil
- Language: Portuguese

São Silvestre is a 2013 Brazilian documentary film directed by Lina Chamie, about the São Silvestre road race, the most prestigious open-pit race of Latin America, held annually in São Paulo, on 31 December. With a camera attached to the body of the actor Fernando Alves Pinto, the film seeks to capture the tiredness, the speed, the sweat, the breath and the movement of the athletes.
