= Murali Kumar Gavit =

Indian long-distance runner

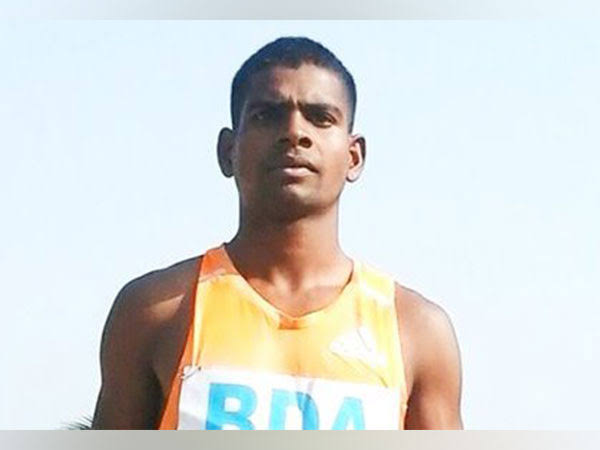

Personal information
- Full name: Murali Kumar Tulsyabhai Gavit
- Born: 8 January 1997 (age 29) Kumarband, Dang district, Gujarat, India

Sport
- Country: India
- Sport: Track and field
- Event(s): 5000 metres, 10,000 metres
Medal record
Men's athletics
Representing India
Asian Athletics Championships
Bronze medal – third place	2019 Doha	10,000 metres
Asian Junior Athletics Championships
Bronze medal – third place	2016 Ho Chi Minh City	5000 metres

Murali Kumar Gavit (born 8 January 1997) is an Indian long-distance runner. He won the bronze medal in the men's 10,000 metres event at 2019 Asian Athletics Championships.

In May 2023, Murali won TCS World 10K Bengluru.
