= Chala Regasa =

Ethiopian long-distance runner

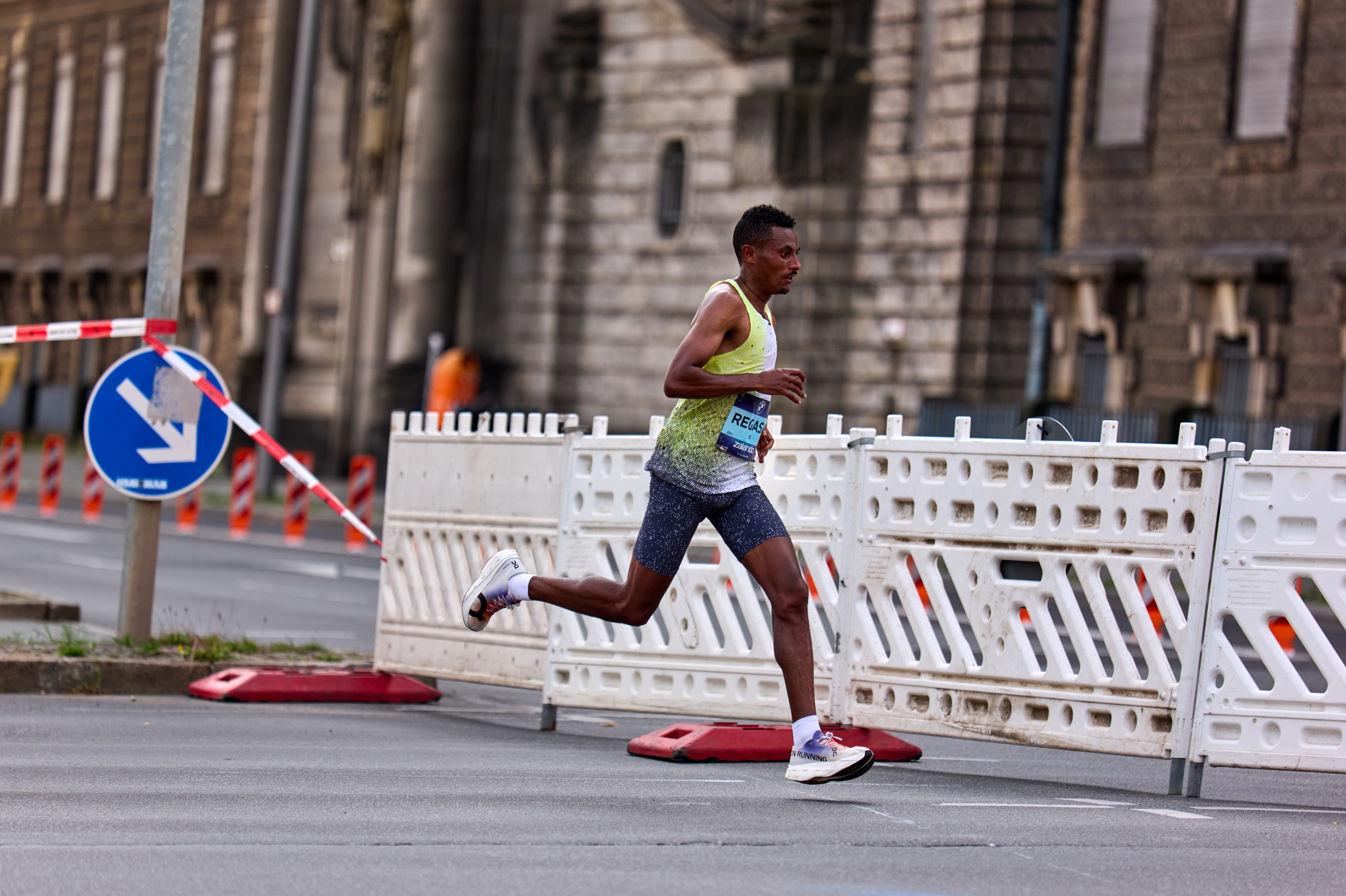
- Regasa in 2025

Personal information
- Nationality: Ethiopian
- Born: 30 April 1997 (age 29)

Sport
- Sport: Athletics
- Event(s): Long-distance running, Marathon, Half Marathon

Chala Ketama Regasa (born 30 April 1997) is an Ethiopian long-distance runner who specializes in road running events, including the marathon and half marathon. He has won several international marathons and is known for his highly competitive personal best times.

== Career ==
Chala Regasa began his professional running career focusing on shorter road distances. In 2019, he won the 10K Valencia Ibercaja with a personal best time of 27:23. That same year, he also served as a pacemaker for Eliud Kipchoge during his historic sub-2-hour marathon attempt (INEOS 1:59 Challenge) in Vienna.

In 2022, Regasa achieved a personal best in the half marathon, running 59:10 to finish second at the eDreams Mitja Marató de Barcelona. He also won the Vedanta Delhi Half-Marathon with a time of 1:00:30 that year.

Regasa made his full marathon debut in 2023, where he finished fifth at the Rotterdam Marathon with a time of 2:06:11.

In the 2024 marathon season, Regasa won the Vienna City Marathon in April with a time of 2:06:35. In December, he became the first Ethiopian man to win the Abu Dhabi Marathon, crossing the line in 2:06:16.

In April 2025, Regasa further improved his marathon personal best at the Rotterdam Marathon, finishing second in 2:05:06.

== Personal bests ==
- Marathon – 2:05:06 (Rotterdam, 13 April 2025)
- Half Marathon – 59:10 (Barcelona, 3 April 2022)
- 10 Kilometres Road – 27:23 (Valencia, 13 January 2019)
