= Jackline Cherono =

Kenyan marathon runner (born 1998)

Personal information
- Nationality: Kenyan
- Born: 25 June 1998 (age 27)

Sport
- Country: Kenya
- Sport: Athletics
- Event: Long-distance running

Jackline Cherono (born 25 June 1998) is a Kenyan marathon runner.

Cherono started her career as a Steeplechase runner in 2014 and competed in later years also in middle-distance and long-distance races at the track. In 2022 she had an accident where she suffered a seriously leg injury. She returned to competition on the road at the 2023 Enschede Marathon where she finished fourth. Later the year in October, she won the 100th edition of the Košice Peace Marathon in Košice, Slovakia with a time of 2:24:43. In April 2025, she won the Rotterdam Marathon in Rotterdam, Netherlands with a time of 2:21:15 ahead of Kenyan Aminet Ahmed and Azemra Gebru.

She is married to Kenyan marathon runner Patrick Ketter.
