= Dawit Fikadu =

Bahriani runner (born 1995)

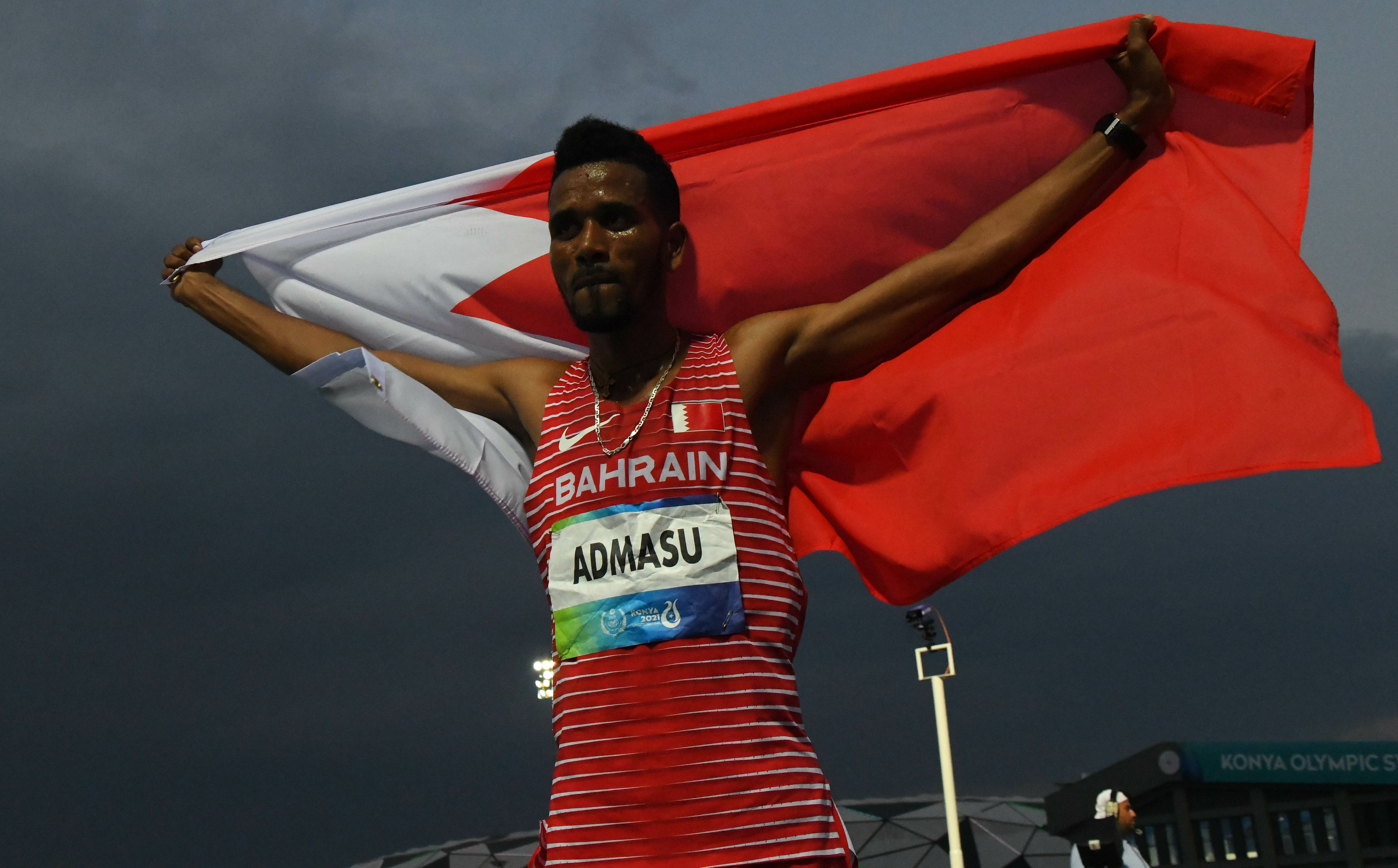
- Fikadu at the 2021 Islamic Solidarity Games

Personal information
- Full name: Dawit Fikadu Admasu
- Born: 29 December 1995 (age 30) Ethiopia
- Height: 1.77 m (5 ft 10 in)
- Weight: 61 kg (134 lb)

Sport
- Sport: Athletics
- Event(s): 5000 metres, 10000 metres, 15 km
Medal record
Men's athletics
Representing Bahrain
Asian Games
Bronze medal – third place	2022 Hangzhou	5000 m
Asian Championships
Gold medal – first place	2019 Doha	10,000 m
Islamic Solidarity Games
Gold medal – first place	2021 Konya	10,000 m
Arab Games
Gold medal – first place	2023 Bir El Djir	10,000 m
Arab Championships
Gold medal – first place	2021 Radès	10,000 m
West Asian Championships
Gold medal – first place	2023 Doha	5000 m
Gold medal – first place	2023 Doha	10,000 m
Silver medal – second place	2018 Amman	5000 m
Silver medal – second place	2018 Amman	10,000 m
GCC Games
Silver medal – second place	2022 Kuwait City	5000 m

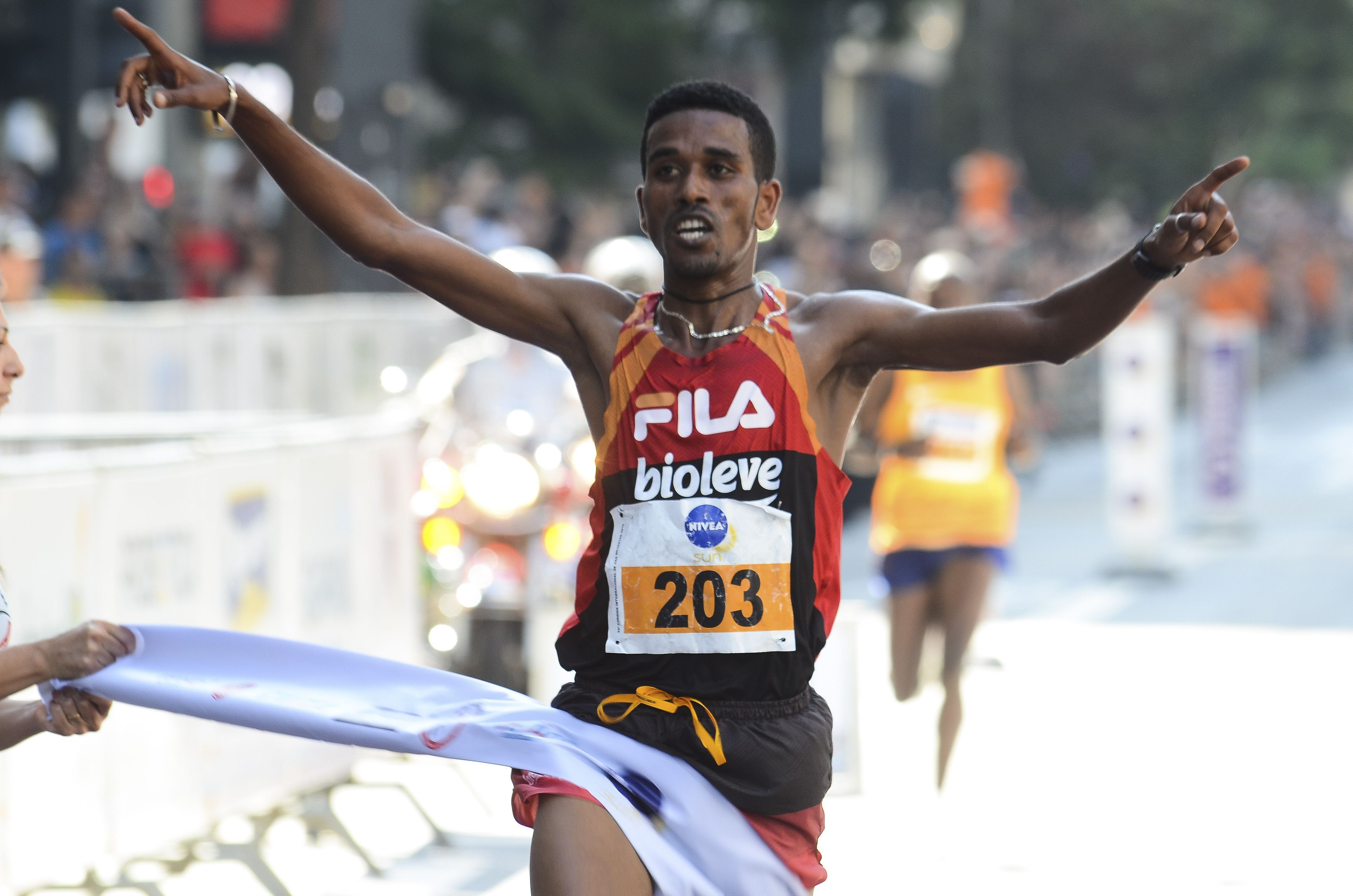
Fikadu at the 2016 Saint Silvester Road Race

Dawit Fikadu Admasu (born 29 December 1995) is a Bahraini long-distance runner. Originally from Ethiopia, he obtained Bahraini citizenship in 2017. He won the Saint Silvester Road Race in 2014 and 2017 and the Okpekpe Road Race in 2019. He also won the 10,000 metres at the 2019 Asian Athletics Championships.

== Personal bests ==
Outdoor

- 5000 metres – 13:10.40 (Lausanne 2019)
- 10,000 metres – 28:26.30 (Doha 2019)

Road

- 10 km – 27:56 (Casablanca 2016)
- 15 km – 43:53 (Mersin 2016)
- Half marathon – 1:00:01 (Manama 2019)
