= Catherine Amanang'ole =

Kenyan long-distance runner (born 2002)

Personal information
- Nationality: Kenya
- Born: Catherine Reline Amanang'ole; 5 October 2002 (age 23)

Sport
- Sport: Athletics

Achievements and titles
- Personal best(s): 5000m: 16:18.01 (Nairobi, 2018); 10,000m: 30:07.42 (Eugene, 2024); Half marathon: 1:05:39 (Barcelona, 2023); Marathon: 2:20:34 (Abu Dhabi, 2024)
Medal record
Women's athletics
Representing Kenya
World Road Running Championships
Bronze medal – third place	2023 Riga	Half marathon

Catherine Reline Amanang'ole (born 5 October 2002) is a Kenyan-born long-distance runner. She won a bronze medal in the half marathon at the 2023 World Athletics Road Running Championships in Riga.

== Biography ==
Amangang'ole finished fourth at the South American Half Marathon Championships in Buenos Aires on 21 August 2022. In December 2022, she won the Saint Silvester Road Race in São Paulo, Brazil, in a time of 49:39.

On 1 October 2023 she completed a Kenyan 1-2-3 at the World Athletics Road Running Championships in Riga, Latvia by finishing third in the half marathon in a time of 1:07:34, behind compatriots Peres Jepchirchir and Margaret Kipkemboi. In December 2023, she won the Saint Silvester Road Race in São Paulo, Brazil once again in a time of 49:54.

In September 2024, she finished third at the Copenhagen Half Marathon in 1:06:09. In December, she won the Abu Dhabi Marathon in 2:20:34. She retained her title the following year, becoming the first woman to have back-to-back victories at the Abu Dhabi Marathon, running 2:21.17.

In January 2026, she was one of a number of athletes, including fellow Kenyan-born distance runner Brigid Kosgei, who had reportedly applied to World Athletics to change international allegiance to Turkey. The applications were declined by World Athletics in April 2026 as "inconsistent with the core principles of the regulations". Later that month, Amanang’ole ran 2:21:20 to place fifth at the 2026 London Marathon.
