= Marius Kimutai =

Bahraini long-distance runner

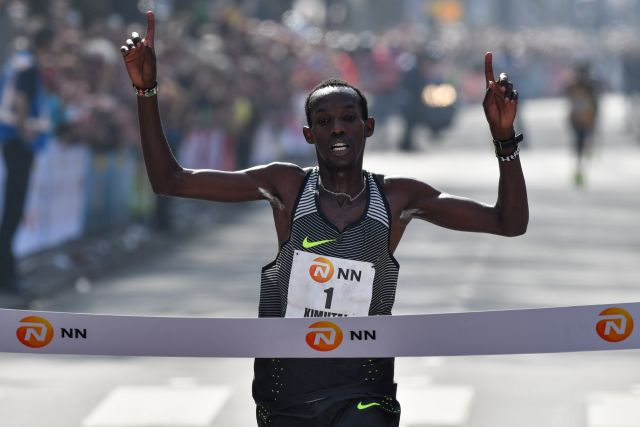

Personal information
- Born: 10 December 1992 (age 32)

Sport
- Country: Bahrain
- Sport: Athletics
- Event: Long-distance running

Marius Kimutai (born 10 December 1992) is a Kenyan-born Bahraini long-distance runner.

== Career ==
In 2015, he won the Dalian International Marathon in Dalian, China with a time of 2:15:18.

In 2017, he won the Rotterdam Marathon in Rotterdam, Netherlands with a time of 2:06:04. That year, he also won the Ljubljana Marathon in Ljubljana, Slovenia with a time of 2:08:33.

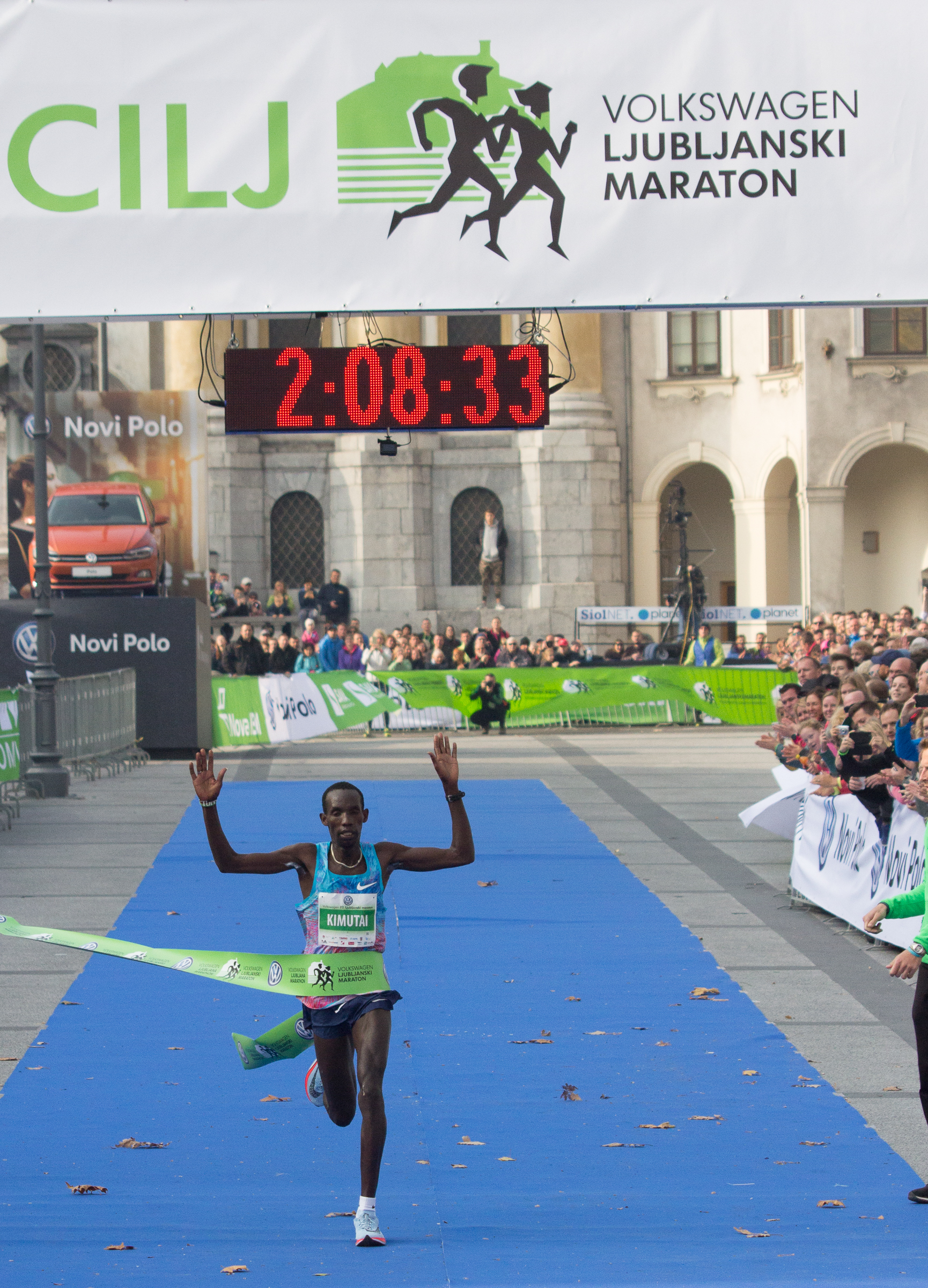
Marius Kimutai winning the 2017 Ljubljana Marathon

In 2019, he won the Hangzhou International Marathon in Hangzhou, China with a time of 2:10:05 which was also a new course record. He became the first Bahraini winner of the event.

In 2023 Marius Kimutai won the Barcelona Marathon with 02:05:06

On 10 April 2024, Marius Kimutai returned a signed Admission of Anti-Doping Rule Violations and Acceptance of Consequences form, confirming that he admitted to the anti-doping rule violations and accepted the claimed period of ineligibility. On 15 April, Marius Kimutai was suspended for three years for doping.

== Achievements ==
Year	Competition	Venue	Position	Event	Notes
2013	Brescia Marathon	Brescia, Italy	1st	Marathon	2:13:02
2014	Taiyuan Marathon	Taiyuan, China	2nd	Marathon	2:13:16
2014	Danzhou International Marathon	Danzhou, China	1st	Marathon	2:12:27
2015	Chongqing Marathon	Chongqing, China	3rd	Marathon	2:13:45
2015	Dalian International Marathon	Dalian, China	1st	Marathon	2:15:18
2015	Rennes Marathon	Rennes, France	1st	Marathon	2:09:14
2016	Mumbai Marathon	Mumbai, India	3rd	Marathon	2:09:39
2016	Yellow River Estuary International Marathon	Dongyang, China	2nd	Marathon	2:09:32
2016	Amsterdam Marathon	Amsterdam, Netherlands	3rd	Marathon	2:05:47
2017	Rotterdam Marathon	Rotterdam, Netherlands	1st	Marathon	2:06:04
2017	Ljubljana Marathon	Ljubljana, Slovenia	1st	Marathon	2:08:33
2018	Seoul International Marathon	Seoul, South Korea	4th	Marathon	2:07:45
2019	Chongqing International Marathon	Chongqing, China	4th	Marathon	2:10:37
2019	Taiyuan International Marathon	Taiyuan, China	1st	Marathon	2:09:43
2019	Hangzhou International Marathon	Hangzhou, China	1st	Marathon	2:10:05
