= Hangzhou International Marathon =

Annual marathon race in China

- Date: Early November
- Location: Hangzhou, China
- Event type: Road
- Distance: Marathon
- Primary sponsor: GAC Honda
- Established: 1987 as popular race (2007 recognized by AIMS)
- Course records: Men's: 2:07:47 (2024) (Kenya) Moses Kibet; Women's: 2:22:57 (2024) (Kenya) Helah Kiprop
- Website: Hangzhou Marathon
- Participants: 10,000 ~ (2020)

The Hangzhou International Marathon (Chinese: 杭州国际马拉松赛) is an annual marathon race held in November in Hangzhou, China. It has been recognized by AIMS since 2007.

== Event programme ==
- Full marathon (42.195K)
- Half marathon (21.0975K)
- Short marathon (13.8K)
- Mini marathon (6.8K)
- Family run & couple run (1.2K)

== Winners ==
Date	Men's	Time	Women's	Time
2 Nov 2025	Chalu Deso Gelmisa (ETH)	2:11:15	Ruti Aga (ETH)	2:24:29
3 Nov 2024	Moses Kibet (KEN)	2:07:47	Helah Kiprop (KEN)	2:22:57
17 Dec 2023	Wang Hongwei (CHN)	2:15:03	Xia Yuyu (CHN)	2:30:44
20 Nov 2022	Su Guoxiong (CHN)	2:17:17	Wang Min (CHN)	2:33:47
22 Nov 2020	Su Guoxiong (CHN)	2:13:24	Wang Min (CHN)	2:38:19
3 Nov 2019	Marius Kimutai (BHR)	2:10:05	Agnes Barsosio (KEN)	2:25:20
4 Nov 2018	Michael Njenga (KEN)	2:10:37	Hirut Tibebu (ETH)	2:25:10
5 Nov 2017	Azmeraw Bekele (ETH)	2:10:33	Muluhabt Tsega (ETH)	2:28:08
6 Nov 2016	Mindaye Regasa (ETH)	2:11:21	Anne Bererwe (KEN)	2:31:20
1 Nov 2015	Daniel Derese (ETH)	2:12:30	Ayelu Lemma (ETH)	2:37:14
2 Nov 2014	Kennedy Naibei (KEN)	2:12:11	Yebrgual Melese (ETH)	2:32:45
5 Nov 2013	Mohamed Msandeki (TAN)	2:15:39	Ayelu Lemma (ETH)	2:35:24
2012	Ashenafi Ketema (ETH)	2:12:44	Gong Lihua (CHN)	2:31:55
6 Nov 2011	Timothy Kibet (KEN)	2:19:34	Liu Zhuang (CHN)	2:44:46
7 Nov 2010	Joseph Cheruiyot (KEN)	2:17:59	Wei Jie (CHN)	3:10:54
8 Nov 2009	Morris Mwangi (KEN)	2:18:37	Yue Chao (CHN)	2:39:58
9 Nov 2008	Moses Kibet (KEN)	2:15:04	Sun Yingjie (CHN)	2:53:08
11 Nov 2007	Eric Kiptoon (KEN)	2:18:00	Xie Sainan (CHN)	2:33:08

=== Multiple wins ===
Women's
Athlete	Wins	Years
Ayelu Lemma (ETH)	2	2013, 2015

=== By country ===
Country	Total	Men's	Women's
Kenya	9	7	2
Ethiopia	9	4	5
China	6	0	6
Tanzania	1	1	0
Bahrain	1	1	0
