= 2019 Asian Athletics Championships – Men's 10,000 metres =

Men's 10,000 metres at the 2019 Asian Athletics Championships
- Venue: Khalifa International Stadium
- Location: Doha, Qatar
- Dates: 21 April
- Competitors: 14 from 10 nations
- Winning time: 28:26.30

Medalists
gold medal	Dawit Fikadu	Bahrain
silver medal	Hassan Chani	Bahrain
bronze medal	Gavit Murli Kumar	India

The men's 10,000 metres at the 2019 Asian Athletics Championships was held on 21 April.

== Records ==
Records before the 2019 Asian Athletics Championships
Record	Athlete (nation)	Time (s)	Location	Date
World record	Kenenisa Bekele (ETH)	26.17.53	Brussels, Belgium	26 August 2005
Asian record	Ahmad Hassan Abdullah (QAT)	26:38.76	Brussels, Belgium	5 September 2003
Championship record	Hasan Mahboob (BHR)	28:23.70	Guangzhou, China	14 November 2009
World leading	Joseph Ndirangu (KEN)	27.43.34	Kobe, Japan	20 April 2019
Asian leading	Albert Rop (ETH)	28:21.08	Cairo, Egypt	5 April 2019

== Results ==
Rank	Name	Nationality	Time	Notes
1st place, gold medalist(s)	Dawit Fikadu	Bahrain	28:26.30	PB
2nd place, silver medalist(s)	Hassan Chani	Bahrain	28:31.30	SB
3rd place, bronze medalist(s)	Gavit Murli Kumar	India	28:38.34	PB
4	Tetsuya Yoroizaka	Japan	28:44.86	
5	Duobujie	China	28:57.31	SB
6	Hiroki Abe	Japan	29:17.47	
7	Peng Jianhua	China	29:40.32	SB
8	Abhishek Pal	India	29:51.28	
9	Jalil Nasseri	Iran	30:06.16	PB
10	Mohammad Hashem	Kuwait	31:20.03	SB
11	Noor Aldeen Al-Humaidha	Yemen	32:16.60	
12	Hussain Fazeel Haroon	Maldives	32:46.14	NR
13	Berdigul Aitpaiuulu	Kyrgyzstan	33:09.04	SB
14	Vann Pheara	Cambodia	35:06.66	SB
	Tariq Ahmed Al-Amri	Saudi Arabia	DNS	
	Mubarak Al-Marashda	United Arab Emirates	DNS	
