= Okpekpe Road Race =

- Date: May
- Location: Okpekpe, Nigeria
- Event type: Road
- Distance: 10K run
- Established: 2013
- Course records: Men's: 28:28 (2023) (Kenya) Daniel Ebenyo; Women's: 32:38 (2023) (Kazakhstan) Caroline Kipkirui
- Website: Okpekpe Road Race
- Participants: 428 (2019)

Okpekpe road race is an annual event in Edo State, Nigeria. It is a 10 Kilometre road race over hills and tarred roads, starting from Apana Road and ending in Okpekpe town. The 2018 edition of the race featured participants from Kenya, Eritrea, Ethiopia, Uganda, Morocco, Israel, Bahrain, Morocco and Nigeria. Kenyan Kibet Alex won the men’s category of the 2018 edition of the race with a finishing time of 29 minutes 46 seconds. Simon Chepat was second with a finishing of 30 minutes 29 seconds and Ronoh Timothy placed third with a finishing time of 30 minutes 39 seconds. Yani Dera Dida won the female category.

The International Association of Athletics Federations (IAAF) silver labelled the Okpekpe international 10km road race.

== Past winners ==
Edition	Year	Men's winner	Time	Women's winner	Time
1st	2013	Moses Masai (KEN)	29:39	Georgina Rono (KEN)	33:01
2nd	2014	Teshome Mekonen (ETH)	28:35	Wude Ayalew (ETH)	32:41
3rd	2015	Alex Korio (KEN)	29:20	Angela Tanui (KEN)	33:34
4th	2016	Simon Cheprot (KEN)	29:48	Polline Wanjiku (KEN)	33:30
5th	2017	Leule Gebrselassie (ETH)	29:28	Azmera Gebru (ETH)	33:59
6th	2018	Alex Kibet (KEN)	29:46	Dera Dida (ETH)	33:00
7th	2019	Dawit Fikadu (BHR)	29:03	Sheila Chelangat (KEN)	33:13
—	2020	Did not held			
—	2021	Did not held			
8th	2022	Yasin Haji (ETH)	29:05	Anchinalu Dessie (ETH)	33:09
9th	2023	Daniel Ebenyo (KEN)	28:28	Caroline Kipkirui (KAZ)	32:38
10th	2024	Edward Zakayo (KEN)	29:31	Gladys Kwamboka (KEN)	33:05
