= Saint Sylvester's Day =

Christian saint's day

Saint Sylvester's Day Feast of Saint Sylvester
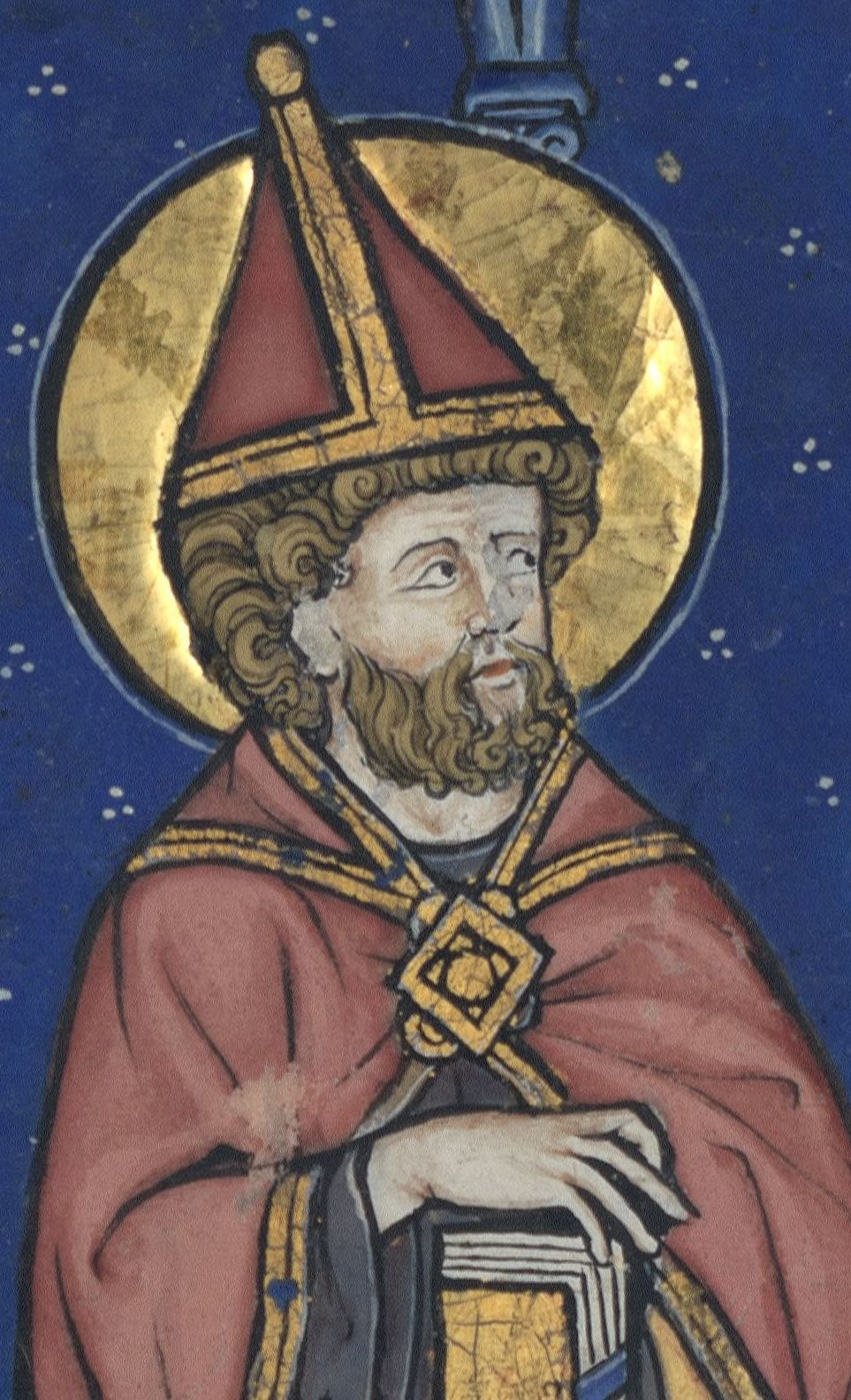
- Saint Sylvester as depicted in the 13th century Livre d'images de madame Marie
- Also called: Silvester
- Observed by: Anglicanism, Catholicism, Eastern Orthodoxy, Lutheranism, Reformed
- Type: Christian
- Significance: Feast Day of Pope Saint Sylvester I Final day of the Gregorian calendar year
- Celebrations: Fireworks, Theatre-going, Feasting, Making a toast, Partying
- Observances: Attending a Watchnight Mass, often held around midnight
- Date: 31 December (Western Christianity); 2 January (Eastern Christianity)
- Frequency: Annual
- Related to: New Year's Eve, Christmastide, New Year's Day, Feast of the Naming and Circumcision of Jesus, Solemnity of Mary, Mother of God

Saint Sylvester's Day, also known as Silvester or the Feast of Saint Sylvester, is the day of the feast of Pope Sylvester I, a saint who served as Pope from 314 to 335. Medieval legend made him responsible for the conversion of emperor Constantine. Among the Western churches, the feast day is held on the anniversary of Saint Sylvester's death, 31 December, a date that, since the adoption of the Gregorian calendar, has coincided with New Year's Eve. For these Christian denominations, Saint Sylvester's Day liturgically marks the seventh day of Christmastide. Eastern churches celebrate Sylvester's feast on a different day from the Western churches, i.e. on 2 January. Saint Sylvester's Day celebrations are marked by church attendance at a Watchnight Mass that is often held around midnight, as well as fireworks, partying, and feasting.

== Pope Sylvester I ==
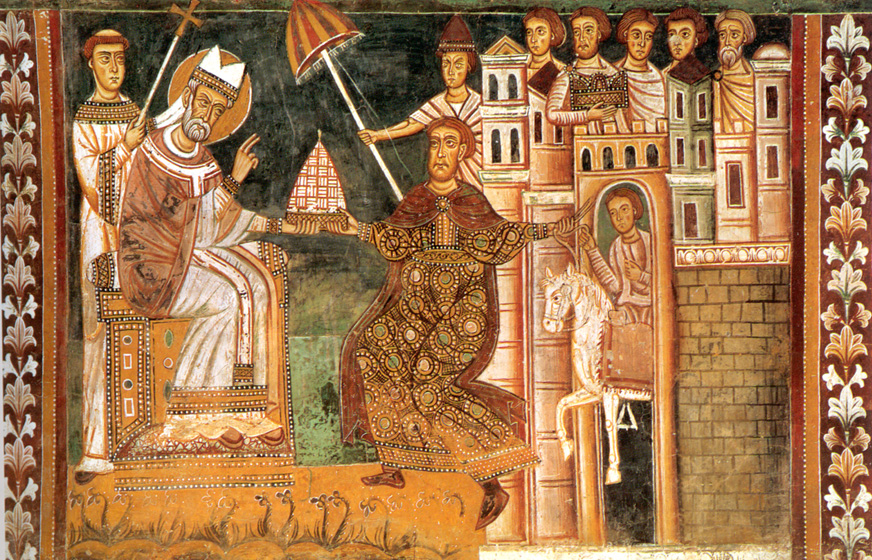
Saint Sylvester with the Emperor Constantine the Great

Under the reign of Pope Sylvester I, several of the magnificent Christian churches were built, including the Basilica of Saint John Lateran, Santa Croce Church, and Old St. Peter's Basilica, among others. During the papacy of Sylvester I, the Nicene Creed, which is recited by communicants of the vast majority of the world's Christian denominations, was formulated. Sylvester is said to have healed, in the name of Christ, the emperor Constantine the Great of leprosy. After dying, Sylvester was buried on 31 December in the Catacomb of Priscilla.

== Regional traditions ==
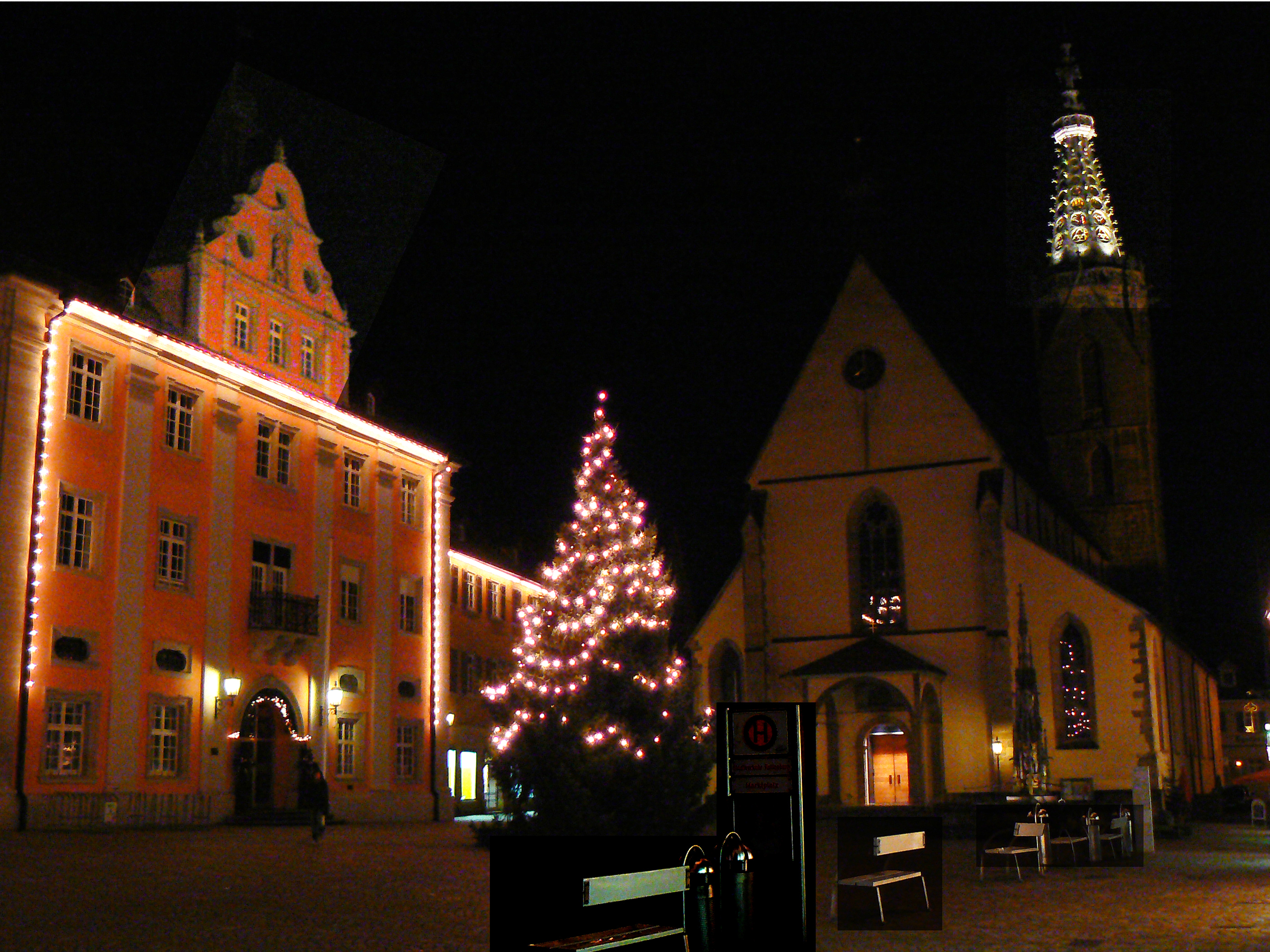
The German city of Rottenburg am Neckar decorated for Christmas and Silvester

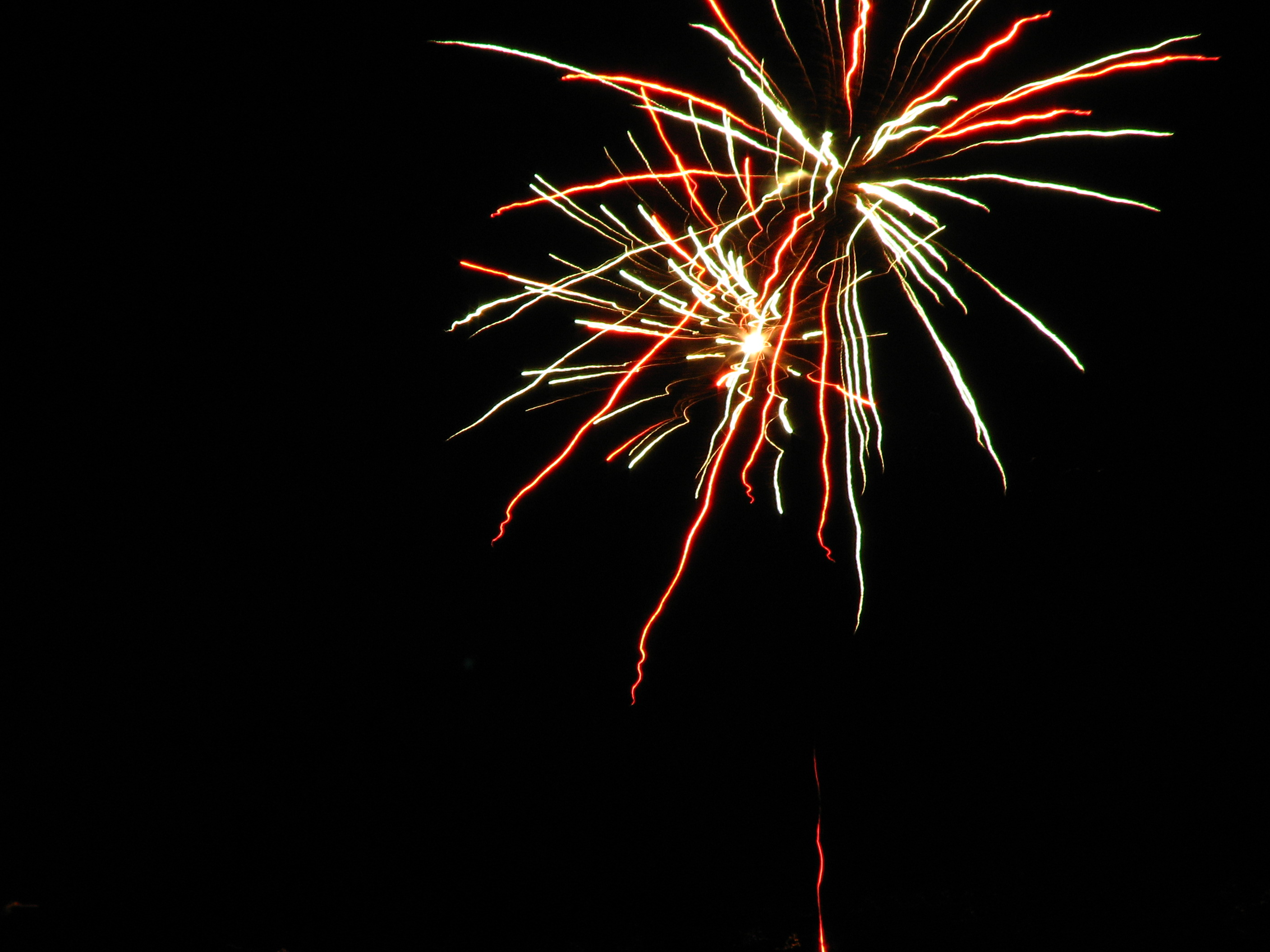
Saint Sylvester's Day fireworks in Kraków

Several countries, primarily in Europe, use a variant of Silvester's name as the preferred name for the holiday; these countries include Austria, Bosnia and Herzegovina, Croatia, Czech Republic, France, Germany, Hungary, Israel, Italy, Liechtenstein, Luxembourg, Poland, Slovakia, Switzerland, and Slovenia.

=== Austria and Germany ===
In the capital of Austria, Vienna, people walk pigs on leashes for their Saint Silvester's Day celebration in hope to have good luck for the coming year. Many Christian households in Germany mark Saint Silvester's Day by practicing the custom of Bleigiessen using Silvesterblei (Silvester lead), in which Silvesterblei is melted over a flame in an old spoon and dropped into a bowl of cold water; one's fortune for the coming year is determined by the shape of the lead. If the lead forms a ball (der Ball), luck will roll one's way, while the shape of a star (der Stern) signifies happiness.

=== Belgium ===
Christians of Belgium have a tradition that a maiden who does not finish her work by the time of sunset on Saint Silvester's Day will not get married in the year to come.

=== Brazil ===
Along with exploding fireworks, the Saint Silvester Road Race, Brazil's oldest and most prestigious running event, takes place on Saint Sylvester's Day and is dedicated to him.

=== Israel ===
In Israel, New Year's Eve is referred to as Silvester to distinguish it from Rosh Hashanah—the Jewish New Year—which occurs in either September or October.

As some Israelis consider Pope Sylvester to have been an antisemite, the observation of New Year's Eve has been divisive among parts of the country's Jewish population, and celebrations tend to be relatively modest in comparison to other countries. In 2014, a report by a wearable technology manufacturer found that an average of 33% of Israelis went to bed before midnight on 31 December; notably, New Year's Eve is not an official holiday in Israel and 1 January is a regular workday, unless falling on a weekend.

Soviet diaspora (such as Russian Jews) that celebrate Novy God—a secular observance of the New Year with elements of Christmas that was established by the Communist Party—have sometimes been criticized for celebrating an antisemitic holiday. In the mid-2010s, campaigns emerged to promote the holiday to first and second-generation immigrants in Israel, as well as non-Russians, in an effort to build cultural awareness.

=== Italy ===
On Saint Sylvester's Day, "lentils and slices of sausage are eaten because they look like coins and symbolize good fortune and the richness of life for the coming year."

=== Switzerland ===
On the morning of Saint Sylvester's Day, the children of a Christian family compete with one another to see who can wake up the earliest; the child who arises the latest is playfully jeered. Men have, for centuries, masqueraded as Silvesterklaus on Saint Sylvester's Day.

=== Ossetia ===
As late as the 19th century, the nominally Christian Ossetians – an ancient Iranian people of the Caucasus descended from the Scythian nomads of the steppes – still had a class of shaman-like soothsayers called Burkudzauta or Kurysdzauta who would, on the eve of Saint Sylvester's Day, undertake dream journeys to the land of the dead in order to wrest from the warlike dead a bountiful harvest in the year to come. This practice was first documented in the year 1824 by pioneering ethnographer and orientalist Julius Klaproth. Italian historian Carlo Ginzburg has noted (in his work Ecstasies: Deciphering the Witches' Sabbath) marked parallels between this Ossetian 'combat in ecstasy' and those formerly practised by the benandanti of Friuli and also by certain other shaman-like figures in Hungary and the Balkans.
