= Astana Marathon =

Annual race in Kazakhstan since 1986

- Date: September or October
- Location: Astana, Kazakhstan
- Event type: Road
- Distance: Marathon, 10K
- Established: 2015 (11 years ago)
- Website: https://astana42k.com

The Astana Marathon (Kazakh: Астана Марафон) is an annual road-based marathon hosted by Astana, Kazakhstan, since 2015. The marathon is a World Athletics Label Road Race and a member of the Association of International Marathons and Distance Races. A 10K race is also held on the same day.

== History ==
In 2009, the British-Kazakh Society (BKS) began organizing races in Almaty and Astana in Kazakhstan, and in London in the United Kingdom. The marathon distance was first offered in Astana in 2015. The inaugural marathon race was held on 13 September 2015 as the "BKS Air Astana Marathon".
