= Saint Silvester Road Race =

New Year's Eve running event in São Paulo, Brazil

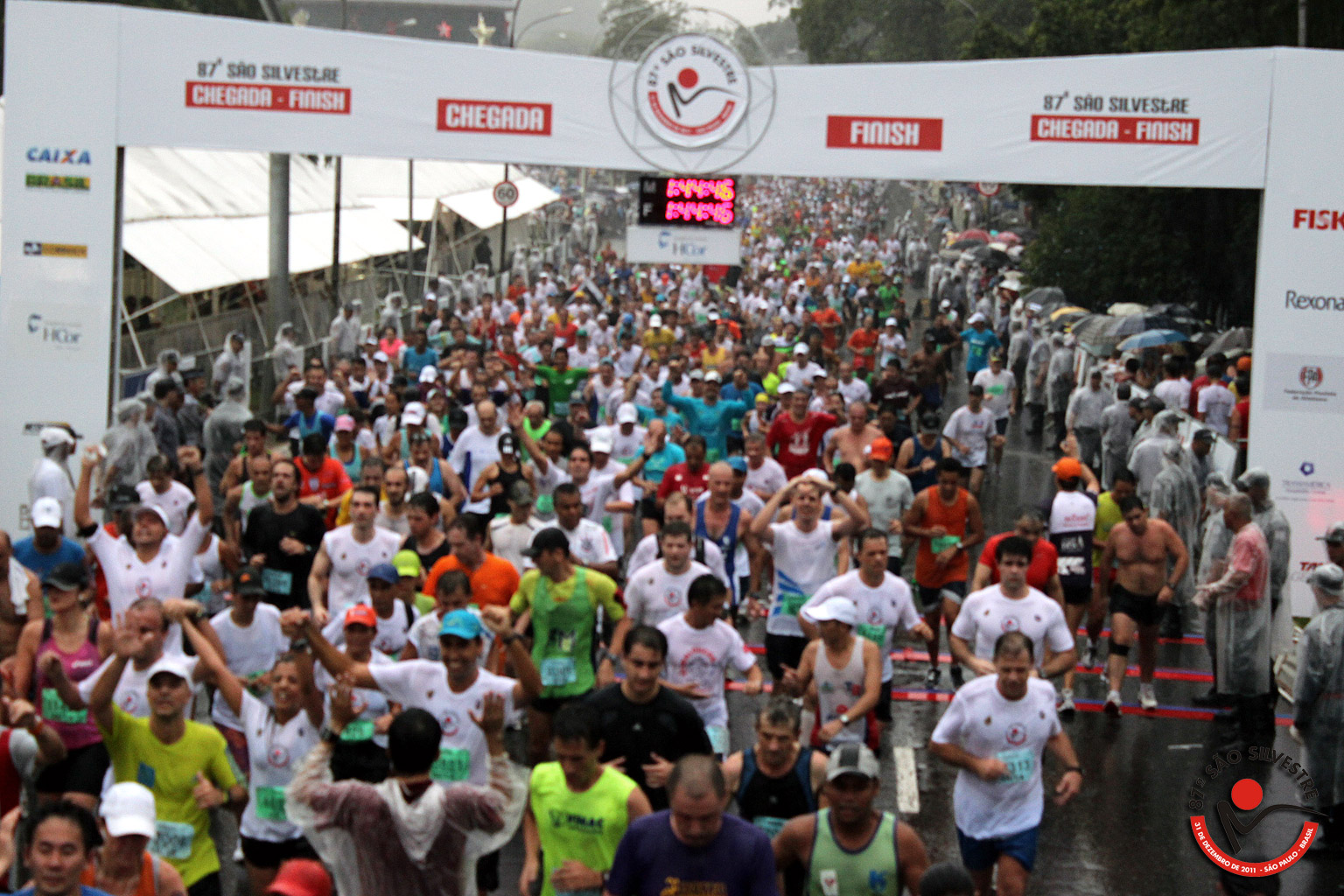
- Saint Silvester Road Race in 2011
- Date: 31 December
- Location: São Paulo, Brazil
- Event type: Road
- Distance: 15 kilometres (since 1991)
- Primary sponsor: Fundação Cásper Líbero
- Established: 1925
- Course records: Men: 42:59 (2019) (Kenya) Kibiwott Kandie; Women: 48:35 (2016) (Kenya) Jemima Sumgong
- Website: Corrida de São Silvestre

The Saint Silvester Road Race (Portuguese: Corrida Internacional de São Silvestre) is a long-distance running event, the oldest and most prestigious street race in Brazil.

Regarded as the main international event in Latin American athletics, the Brazilian competition is held yearly in the city of São Paulo on December 31. This day is Saint Sylvester's Day, as it is the day in which the Catholic saint, who was a Pope, died in the 4th century of the Christian Era.

São Paulo's race was originally known as a "marathon", although the course of the race, whose length has varied considerably over the years, was never that of a full marathon. Because of that, the organization eventually dropped the term "marathon", starting to refer to the event as a "race", "international race" or "road race". There was never an official effort on the part of the organization to address the change in the nomenclature, which causes many, including some media outlets, to continue using the term "Saint Silvester Marathon" when referring to the event. Its course is only 15 km (9.3 mi) long, just over a third of a marathon. However, the race is made more difficult by the steep streets throughout the course and the fact that it happens during the local summertime.

Several other places like Amadora, Porto and Volta à cidade do Funchal in Portugal (Corrida de São Silvestre), Calderara di Reno (Maratona di San Silvestro) and Bolzano (BOclassic) in Italy, and Madrid in Spain (San Silvestre Vallecana), organize yearly Saint Silvester road races or marathons every late December.

== History ==
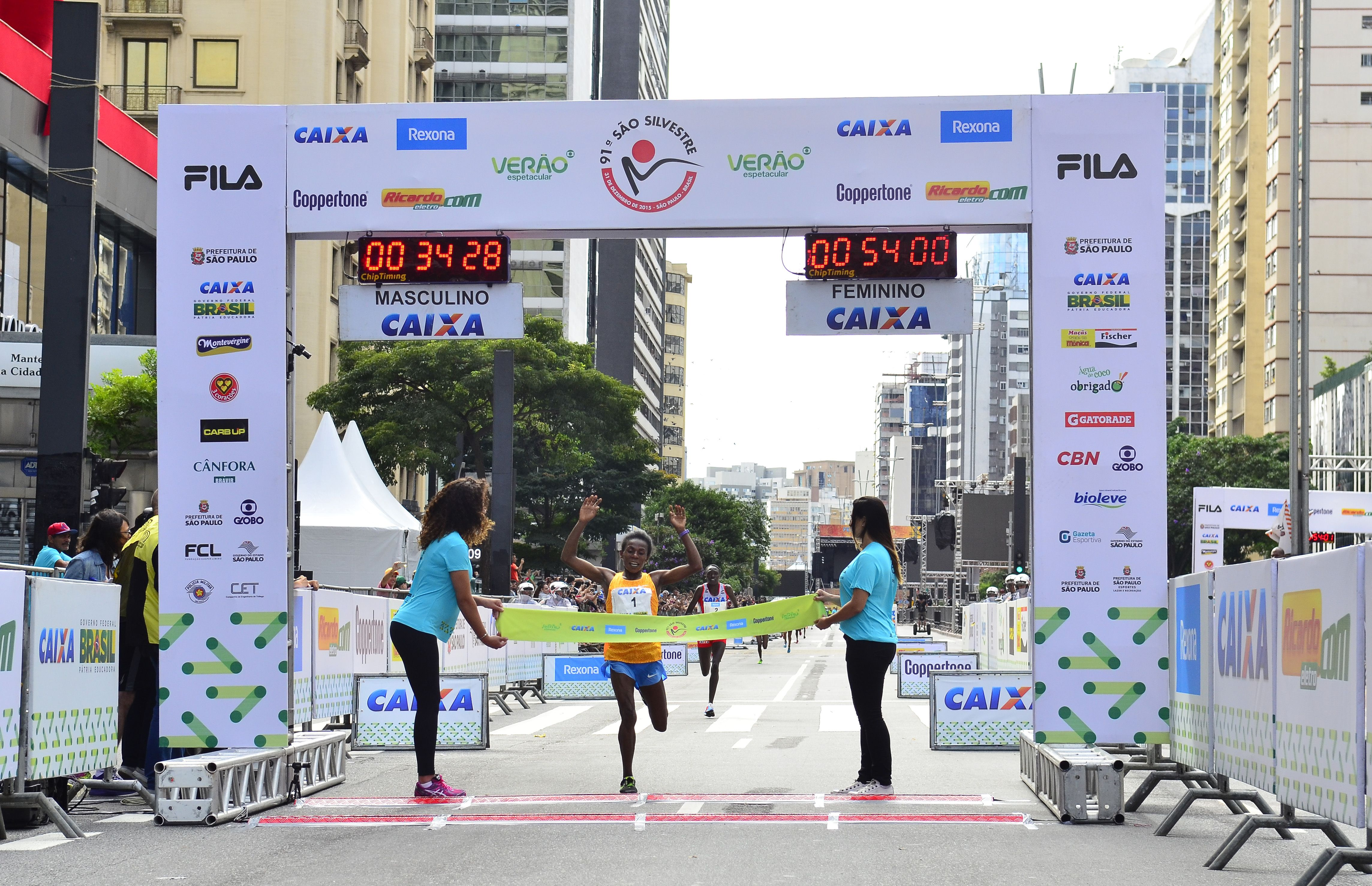
Wude Ayalew winning the women's race in 2015

Cásper Líbero, a "media millionaire" of the early 20th century Brazil, is credited with originally coming up with the idea for the race. He used it as a means of promoting his newspaper. In 1928, the year of the race's 4th edition, he founded one of the first sports newspapers of the country, the Gazeta Esportiva (the Sportive Gazette), which then became the race's official organizer and sponsor. The race would be the main advertising element of this sports newspaper.

The race was held for the first time on 31 December 1925 and hadn't been interrupted or suspended even once until 2020, not even for the duration of World War II.

Originally, it was intended for men only, and participation was restricted to citizens of the city of São Paulo. In the following years, runners from other parts of the country joined the race, but it was not until 1941 that a runner not from the city of São Paulo won the race: José Tibúrcio dos Santos, of Minas Gerais, another Brazilian state. At that time, the event was not yet open to foreign participation. That meant that athletes from other countries could not come in to participate, but foreigners residing in the city of São Paulo (immigrants) were free to enroll. Because of this, Italian Heitor Blasi was the only foreigner to have won the race before 1947.

In 1945 the field was opened so that foreign runners could participate. The first international race was restricted to invited runners from South America, but the success of the first two "international events" led race organizers to open the event to the rest of the world in 1947. That year marked the beginning of a 34-year-long period during which no Brazilian man won the event, until José João da Silva, from Pernambuco, won in 1980 (he would repeat the feat in 1985).

The event would remain a men-only affair until 1975, when the United Nations declared that year as the International Year of Women. In commemoration of this, the race organizers held the women's race for the first time. The women's race started as an open event, and the first Brazilian victory would come only in its 20th edition (in 1995), when Carmem Oliveira won.

Starting December 31, 1982, Rede Globo began to telecast the road race via satellite to the whole of Brazil, in partnership with TV Gazeta.

Since 1993, a shorter race for children is held a few days before the main event (dubbed "São Silvestrinha", or "Little Saint Silvester" – a unisex event).

Until 1988, the race took place at the late night hour starting at 23:00, approaching the New Year's, but the year of 1989 – the year the race began to be recognized as an international running event – saw substantial changes in the race's format, in order to comply with the rules of the World Athletics. The time of the race was altered for first afternoon (to 3:00 p.m. for women and 5:00 p.m. for men), the course direction was reversed, and men and women, who used to run together, had their races separated. In 1991, the length of the race was extended to 15,000 meters (the distance for the event used to vary almost yearly, usually between 6.5 km and 8.8 km). This variance needed to be corrected in order to meet IAAF marathon and road race regulations and requirements.

The 2020 race was postponed to July 2021 and later cancelled due to the COVID-19 pandemic in Brazil, mark the first time that the race was not held since the debut in 1925.

== Growth and prestige ==
For the first race, in 1925, 60 people filled applications to participate, but only 48 actually showed up on the day of the race. Of these, only 37 were officially qualified, since the rules then required that all runners had to finish within 3 minutes of the winner in order to qualify in the final board.

In 2004, 13,000 men and 2,000 women participated in their respective events.

Although the event had been open since 1945, it would become a noteworthy affair in the international calendar only in 1953, when the most famous runner of the time (and arguably of all time), Emil Zátopek, participated and won the race. In recent times, the foremost long distance runners of the last two decades (almost all of them, with the exception of Haile Gebrselassie of Ethiopia) have participated at least once in the event.

The principal winner of all times is now Paul Tergat, of Kenya, who has won the race 5 times (1995, 1996, 1998, 1999 and 2000). The record time for the present distance of 15 km is for his compatriot Kibiwott Kandie with a time of 42 minutes and 59 seconds in the 2019 edition.

== Champions ==
Course record (for 15 km distance)

Edition	Year	Distance	Men's winner	Time (m:s)	Women's winner	Time (m:s)
National era
1st	1925	6.2 km	Alfredo Gomes (BRA)	23:10	Not held	
2nd	1926	6.2 km	Jorge Mancebo (BRA)	22:32	Not held	
3rd	1927	6.2 km	Heitor Blasi (ITA)	23:00	Not held	
4th	1928	8.8 km	Salim Maluf (BRA)	29:11	Not held	
5th	1929	8.8 km	Heitor Blasi (ITA)	29:11	Not held	
6th	1930	8.8 km	Murilo de Araújo (BRA)	25:35	Not held	
7th	1931	8.2 km	José Agnello (BRA)	26:05	Not held	
8th	1932	8.8 km	Nestor Gomes (BRA)	25:23	Not held	
9th	1933	7.6 km	Nestor Gomes (BRA)	23:50	Not held	
10th	1934	7.6 km	Alfredo Carletti (BRA)	24:10	Not held	
11th	1935	7.6 km	Nestor Gomes (BRA)	25:51	Not held	
12th	1936	7.6 km	Mario de Oliveira (BRA)	23:38	Not held	
13th	1937	7.6 km	Mario de Oliveira (BRA)	23:26	Not held	
14th	1938	7.6 km	Armando Martins (BRA)	23:38	Not held	
15th	1939	7.6 km	Luiz Del Greco (BRA)	24:50	Not held	
16th	1940	7 km	Antônio Alves (BRA)	23:14	Not held	
17th	1941	7 km	José dos Santos (BRA)	22:12	Not held	
18th	1942	5.5 km	Joaquim da Silva (BRA)	17:02	Not held	
19th	1943	5.5 km	Joaquim da Silva (BRA)	17:31	Not held	
20th	1944	5.5 km	Joaquim da Silva (BRA)	17:40	Not held	
International era
21st	1945	7 km	Sebastião Monteiro (BRA)	21:54	Not held	
22nd	1946	7 km	Sebastião Monteiro (BRA)	21:57	Not held	
23rd	1947	7 km	Oscar Moreira (URU)	21:45	Not held	
24th	1948	7 km	Raúl Inostroza (CHI)	22:18	Not held	
25th	1949	7.3 km	Viljo Heino (FIN)	22:45	Not held	
26th	1950	7.3 km	Lucien Theys (BEL)	22:37	Not held	
27th	1951	7.3 km	Erik Krucziky (FRG)	22:26	Not held	
28th	1952	7.3 km	Franjo Mihalić (YUG)	21:38	Not held	
29th	1953	7.3 km	Emil Zátopek (TCH)	20:30	Not held	
30th	1954	7.4 km	Franjo Mihalić (YUG)	21:51	Not held	
31st	1955	7.4 km	Ken Norris (GBR)	22:18	Not held	
32nd	1956	7.3 km	Manuel Faria (POR)	21:58	Not held	
33rd	1957	7.3 km	Manuel Faria (POR)	21:37	Not held	
34th	1958	7.4 km	Osvaldo Suárez (ARG)	21:40	Not held	
35th	1959	7.4 km	Osvaldo Suárez (ARG)	21:55	Not held	
36th	1960	7.4 km	Osvaldo Suárez (ARG)	22:02	Not held	
37th	1961	7.4 km	Martin Hyman (GBR)	21:24	Not held	
38th	1962	7.4 km	Hamoud Ameur (FRA)	22:08	Not held	
39th	1963	7.4 km	Rik Clerckx (BEL)	21:55	Not held	
40th	1964	7.4 km	Gaston Roelants (BEL)	21:37	Not held	
41st	1965	7.4 km	Gaston Roelants (BEL)	21:20	Not held	
42nd	1966	9.2 km	Álvaro Mejía (COL)	29:57	Not held	
43rd	1967	8.7 km	Gaston Roelants (BEL)	24:31	Not held	
44th	1968	8.7 km	Gaston Roelants (BEL)	24:32	Not held	
45th	1969	8.7 km	Juan Martínez (MEX)	24:02	Not held	
46th	1970	8.9 km	Frank Shorter (USA)	24:27	Not held	
47th	1971	8.9 km	Rafael Tadeo (MEX)	23:47	Not held	
48th	1972	8.9 km	Víctor Mora (COL)	23:24	Not held	
49th	1973	8.9 km	Víctor Mora (COL)	23:25	Not held	
50th	1974	8.9 km	Rafael Ángel Pérez (CRC)	23:58	Not held	
51st	1975	8.9 km	Víctor Mora (COL)	23:13	Christa Vahlensieck (FRG)	28:39
52nd	1976	8.9 km	Edmundo Warnke (CHI)	23:50	Christa Vahlensieck (FRG)	28:36
53rd	1977	8.9 km	Domingo Tibaduiza (COL)	23:55	Loa Olafsson (DEN)	27:15
54th	1978	8.9 km	Radhouane Bouster (FRA)	23:51	Dana Slater (USA)	28:55
55th	1979	9 km	Herb Lindsay (USA)	23:26	Dana Slater (USA)	29:07
56th	1980	8.9 km	José João da Silva (BRA)	23:40	Heidi Hutterer (FRG)	27:48
57th	1981	8.9 km	Víctor Mora (COL)	23:30	Rosa Mota (POR)	26:45
58th	1982	13.548 km	Carlos Lopes (POR)	39:41	Rosa Mota (POR)	47:21
59th	1983	12.6 km	João da Mata (BRA)	37:39	Rosa Mota (POR)	43:44
60th	1984	12.640 km	Carlos Lopes (POR)	36:43	Rosa Mota (POR)	43:35
61st	1985	12.640 km	José João da Silva (BRA)	36:48	Rosa Mota (POR)	43:00
62nd	1986	12.6 km	Rolando Vera (ECU)	36:45	Rosa Mota (POR)	43:25
63rd	1987	13 km	Rolando Vera (ECU)	39:02	Martha Tenorio (ECU)	46:27
64th	1988	12.630 km	Rolando Vera (ECU)	36:23	Aurora Cunha (POR)	42:12
65th	1989	12.650 km	Rolando Vera (ECU)	36:45	María del Carmen Díaz (MEX)	43:52
66th	1990	12.640 km	Arturo Barrios (MEX)	35:58	María del Carmen Díaz (MEX)	43:16
67th	1991	15 km	Arturo Barrios (MEX)	44:04	María Luisa Servín (MEX)	54:02
68th	1992	15 km	Simon Chemoiywo (KEN)	44:08	María del Carmen Díaz (MEX)	54:00
69th	1993	15 km	Simon Chemoiywo (KEN)	43:20	Hellen Kimaiyo (KEN)	50:26
70th	1994	15 km	Ronaldo da Costa (BRA)	44:11	Derartu Tulu (ETH)	51:17
71st	1995	15 km	Paul Tergat (KEN)	43:12	Carmem de Oliveira (BRA)	50:53
72nd	1996	15 km	Paul Tergat (KEN)	43:50	Roseli Machado (BRA)	52:32
73rd	1997	15 km	Émerson Iser Bem (BRA)	44:40	Martha Tenorio (ECU)	52:03
74th	1998	15 km	Paul Tergat (KEN)	44:47	Olivera Jevtić (YUG)	51:35
75th	1999	15 km	Paul Tergat (KEN)	44:35	Lydia Cheromei (KEN)	51:29
76th	2000	15 km	Paul Tergat (KEN)	43:57	Lydia Cheromei (KEN)	50:33
77th	2001	15 km	Tesfaye Jifar (ETH)	44:15	Maria Zeferina Baldaia (BRA)	52:09
78th	2002	15 km	Robert Cheruiyot (KEN)	44:59	Marizete Rezende (BRA)	54:02
79th	2003	15 km	Marílson dos Santos (BRA)	43:49	Margaret Okayo (KEN)	51:24
80th	2004	15 km	Robert Cheruiyot (KEN)	44:43	Lydia Cheromei (KEN)	52:58
81st	2005	15 km	Marílson dos Santos (BRA)	44:19	Olivera Jevtić (SCG)	51:37
82nd	2006	15 km	Franck de Almeida (BRA)	44:06	Lucélia Peres (BRA)	51:23
83rd	2007	15 km	Robert Cheruiyot (KEN)	45:54	Alice Timbilil (KEN)	51:37
84th	2008	15 km	James Kwambai (KEN)	44:42	Wude Ayalew (ETH)	51:37
85th	2009	15 km	James Kwambai (KEN)	44:40	Paskalia Kipkoech (KEN)	52:30
86th	2010	15 km	Marílson dos Santos (BRA)	44:07	Alice Timbilil (KEN)	50:19
87th	2011	15 km	Tariku Bekele (ETH)	43:35	Priscah Jeptoo (KEN)	48:48
88th	2012	15 km	Edwin Kipsang (KEN)	44:05	Maurine Kipchumba (KEN)	51:42
89th	2013	15 km	Edwin Kipsang (KEN)	43:48	Nancy Kiprop (KEN)	51:58
90th	2014	15 km	Dawit Fikadu (ETH)	45:04	Wude Ayalew (ETH)	50:43
91st	2015	15 km	Stanley Biwott (KEN)	44:31	Wude Ayalew (ETH)	54:01
92nd	2016	15 km	Leul Aleme (ETH)	44:53	Jemima Sumgong (KEN)	48:35
93rd	2017	15 km	Dawit Fikadu (BHR)	44:17	Flomena Cheyech (KEN)	50:18
94th	2018	15 km	Belay Bezabeh (ETH)	45:03	Sandrafelis Tuei (KEN)	50:02
95th	2019	15 km	Kibiwott Kandie (KEN)	42:59	Brigid Kosgei (KEN)	48:54
96th	2021	15 km	Belay Bezabeh (ETH)	44:54	Sandrafelis Tuei (KEN)	50:06
97th	2022	15 km	Andrew Kwemoi (UGA)	44:43	Catherine Reline (KEN)	49:39
98th	2023	15 km	Timothy Kiplagat (KEN)	44:52	Catherine Reline (KEN)	49:54
99th	2024	15 km	Wilson Too (KEN)	44:21	Agnes Keino (KEN)	51:25
100th	2025	15 km	Muse Gizachew (ETH)	44:28	Sisilia Ginoka Panga (TAN)	51:08

== Titles by country ==
Country	Men	Women	Total
Kenya	18	19	37
Brazil	29^{(1)}	5	34
Ethiopia	7	4	11
Portugal	4	7	11
Mexico	4	4	8
Belgium	6	0	6
Colombia	6	0	6
Ecuador	4	2	6
United States	2	2	4
West Germany	1	3	4
Argentina	3	0	3
Chile	2	0	2
France	2	0	2
Italy	2^{(2)}	0	2
Serbia and Montenegro	0	2	2
United Kingdom	2	0	2
Yugoslavia	2	0	2
Bahrain	1^{(3)}	0	1
Costa Rica	1	0	1
Czechoslovakia	1	0	1
Denmark	0	1	1
Finland	1	0	1
Tanzania	0	1	1
Uganda	1	0	1
Uruguay	1	0	1

^{1} Brazilians won 18 times in the national era, and 11 times in the international era.

^{2} Italy only won in the national era, with the Italo-Brazilian, Heitor Blasi.

^{3} After winning for Ethiopia in 2014, Dawit Fikadu became a naturalized Bahraini citizen in 2017.

== See also ==
- São Silvestre (film)
