= Abu Dhabi Marathon =

Annual race in the United Arab Emirates since 2018

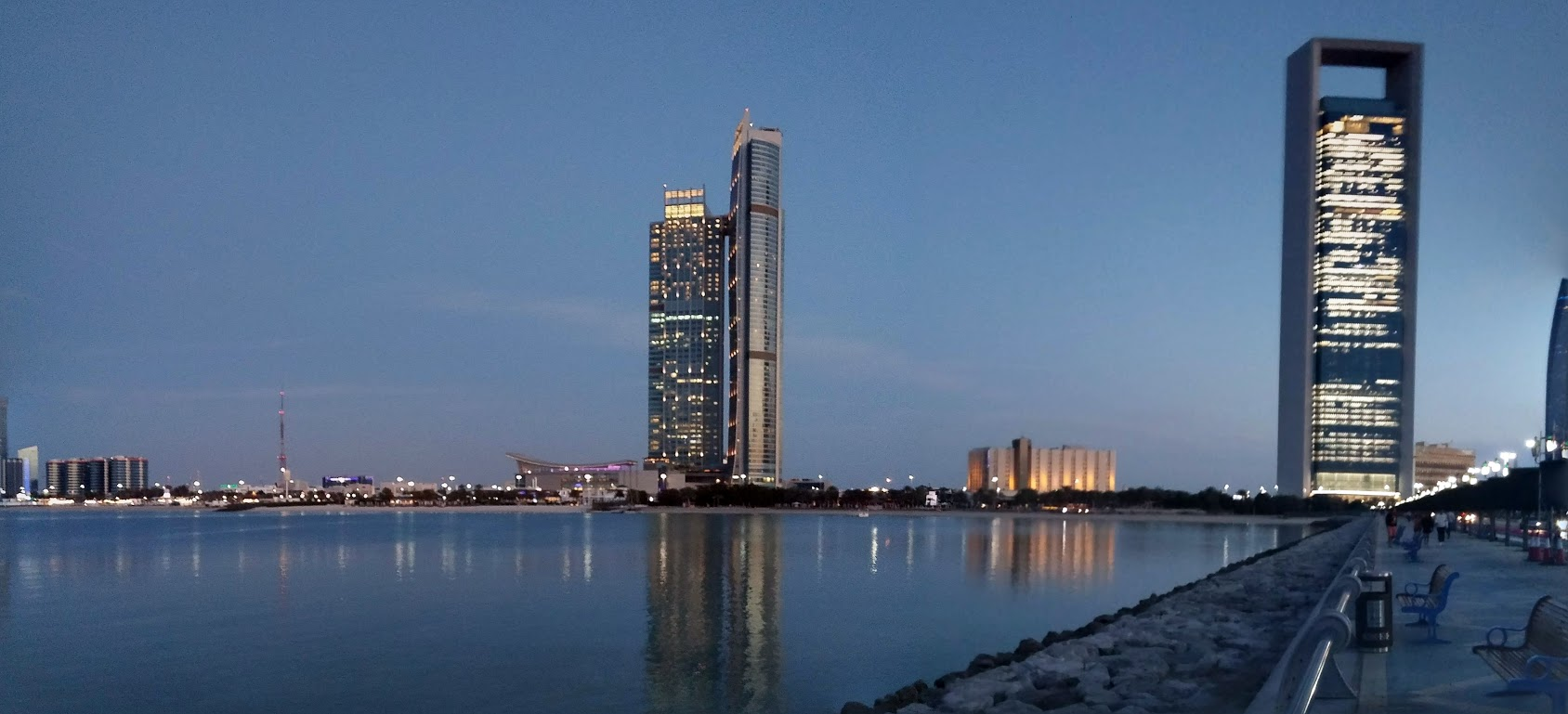
- The tower at ADNOC Headquarters (right), near the start and finish area
- Date: December
- Location: Abu Dhabi, United Arab Emirates
- Event type: Road
- Distance: Marathon, 10K, 5K, 2.5K
- Established: 2018 (8 years ago)
- Course records: 2:04:40 (2019) (men); (Kenya) Reuben Kipyego; 2:19:15 (2023) (women); (Kenya) Brigid Kosgei
- Website: https://www.adnocabudhabimarathon.com

The Abu Dhabi Marathon (also known as the ADNOC Abu Dhabi Marathon for sponsorship reasons) is an annual road-based marathon hosted by Abu Dhabi, United Arab Emirates, since 2018. The marathon is a World Athletics Elite Label Road Race and a member of the Association of International Marathons and Distance Races. During the race weekend, a 10K race, a 5K race, and a 2.5K fun run are also offered.

== History ==
The inaugural race was held on 7 December 2018. The marathon was won by Kenyan runner Marius Kipserem and Ethiopian runner Ababel Yeshaneh, with finish times of 2:04:04 and 2:20:16, respectively. Roughly 10,000 people took part in the event. The marathon had a large prize fund, with 100,000 USD being awarded to each of the two winners.

Shortly after the inaugural race, observers speculated that the course was short, with many runners finishing with significant negative splits and personal records. One person noticed that the times being recorded for the stretch between the 30 km (19 mi) and 35 km (22 mi) marks were unusually fast. Two months later, marathon experts Sean Hartnett and Helmut Winter measured the course and concluded that, due to an incorrectly indicated turnaround point, the "34th kilometer [was] between 195.8 and 199.6 meters short". (Note: The two had driven from Ras Al Khaimah after the Ras Al Khaimah Half Marathon, where the pace display system that they had invented was used. They had no issues with the work of the course measurer, but Hartnett theorized that the traffic cones marking the turnaround point were misplaced due to someone moving them away from the entrance of a busy fish market, and not returning them to the proper position.) World Athletics does not include either winning time in its lists of all-time fastest outdoor marathons.

The men's marathon of the second edition of the event, held on 6 December 2019, was unexpectedly won by Kenyan pacemaker Reuben Kipyego. (Note: Although unusual, Kipyego's feat was not the first time a pacemaker has won a marathon. U.S. pacemaker Paul Pilkington won the 1994 Los Angeles Marathon (and the national championship) even though he was expected to drop out after pacing the first 15.5 mi (24.9 km) of the race, and Kenyan pacemaker Simon Biwott won the 2000 Berlin Marathon even though he was only supposed to set the pace for the first 28 km (17 mi).) Although Kipyego was expected to set the pace for the lead pack and then drop out of the race around the 30 km (19 mi) mark, none of the elite runners had kept up with Kipyego by that point. Still feeling good and finding the race conditions ideal, Kipyego finished the race with a negative split, running a personal best of 2:04:40, nearly two minutes faster than the second-place finisher. His compatriot Vivian Kiplagat also set a personal record with her winning time of 2:21:11, and both runners were each awarded 100,000 USD for their victories.

The 2020 edition of the race was postponed to 2021 due to the coronavirus pandemic, with all registrants given the option of obtaining an entry fee refund (minus an administration fee).

On 17 December 2022, the men's marathon was again won by a pacemaker. After setting the pace for the lead pack, Kenyan runner Timothy Kiplagat eventually found himself alone at the front, so he decided to finish the race and won it by over four minutes. Kiplagat's finish time of 2:05:20 was a personal best. Bahraini runner Eunice Chumba won the women's marathon with a finish time of 2:20:41.

== Course ==
External image
- Course map of marathon in 2022

The marathon runs on a loop course that begins and ends at ADNOC Headquarters. Runners first head southeast to Wahat Al Karama, roughly following the southern edge of the island. The course then heads back northwest, passing by the World Trade Center Abu Dhabi on its way to the Corniche. Marathoners then head northeast for a short out-and-back leg before running the last roughly 5 km (3 mi) southwest along the Corniche to return to the finish area.

The shorter races are run largely along the Corniche.

== Winners ==
Key: Course record (in bold)

| Ed. | Date | Male Winner | Time | Female Winner | Time | Rf. |
|---|---|---|---|---|---|---|
| 1 | 7 December 2018 | Marius Kipserem (KEN) | 2:04:04 (Note: The course was reportedly "between 195.8 and 199.6 meters short" due to misplaced traffic cones, possibly moved without authorization.) | Ababel Yeshaneh (ETH) | 2:20:16 | |
| 2 | 6 December 2019 | Reuben Kipyego (KEN) | **2:04:40** | Vivian Kiplagat (KEN) | 2:21:11 | |
| — | — | postponed in 2020 due to coronavirus pandemic | | | | |
| 3 | 26 November 2021 | Titus Ekiru (KEN) | 2:06:13 | Judith Korir (KEN) | 2:22:30 | |
| 4 | 17 December 2022 | Timothy Kiplagat (KEN) | 2:05:20 | Eunice Chumba (BHR) | 2:20:41 | |
| 5 | 16 December 2023 | Samsom Amare (ERI) | 2:07:10 | Brigid Kosgei (KEN) | **2:19:15** | |
| 6 | 14 December 2024 | Chala Ketema Regasa (ETH) | 2:06:16 | Catherine Amanang'ole (KEN) | 2:20:34 | |
