= Marius Kipserem =

Kenyan long-distance runner

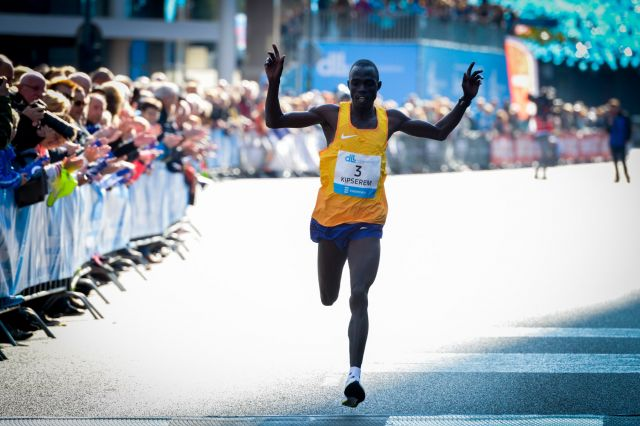
- Kipserem at the 2016 Eindhoven Marathon

Personal information
- Born: 17 May 1988 (age 38)

Sport
- Sport: Athletics
- Event(s): Half marathon, Marathon

Achievements and titles
- Personal bests: Half marathon: 1:02:17 (Nairobi 2013); Marathon: 2:04:11 (Rotterdam 2019)

Marius Kipserem (born 17 May 1988) is a Kenyan long-distance runner who specializes in the marathon. He has notably won the Rotterdam Marathon twice in 2016 and 2019. With his second victory, he set a new course record and personal best of 2:04:11. He also won the 2018 Abu Dhabi Marathon and finished second at the 2016 Eindhoven Marathon. He was also a member of the team that helped pace Eliud Kipchoge for the Ineos 1:59 Challenge in 2019.

In October 2022, Kipseram was issued with a three-year ban for an anti-doping rule violation for using EPO.
