= Shanghai International Half Marathon =

Annual half marathon race in Shanghai, China

Shanghai International Half Marathon (Chinese: 上海国际半程马拉松赛) is an annual international half marathon race held in Pudong, Shanghai, China. Established in 2015, the event has a capacity of about 15,000 participants and covers the standard distance of 21.0975 kilometres. The race starts at the Oriental Pearl Tower and finishes at the Shanghai Oriental Sports Center, passing through landmarks such as the Nanpu Bridge, Expo Avenue and Qiantan Park.

== History ==
The event was inaugurated in 2015 in Pudong. In 2017, the scale of participation expanded from 12,000 to 15,000 runners. The 2018 edition began under the Oriental Pearl Tower, with runners crossing the Nanpu Bridge and Expo Avenue before finishing at the Oriental Sports Center. On 21 April 2019, the fifth anniversary of the race was marked, attracting 15,000 runners from around the world.

On 16 April 2023, Ethiopian runner Alemnesh Eya Seyee set a new women's course record of 1:10:15. On 21 April 2024, Kenyan runner Roncer Kipkorir Konga broke the men's record with a time of 1:00:29.

== Course ==
The half marathon begins at the Oriental Pearl Tower in Lujiazui and finishes at the Shanghai Oriental Sports Center. The route includes several of Pudong's landmarks, such as Nanpu Bridge, Expo Avenue and Qiantan Park.

== See also ==
- Shanghai Marathon
