= Su Guoxiong =

Chinese long-distance runner

Personal information
- Born: 26 May 1992 (age 33)

Sport
- Country: China
- Event: Long-distance running

Su Guoxiong (born 26 May 1992) is a Chinese long-distance runner.

In 2012, he competed in the men's half marathon at the 2012 IAAF World Half Marathon Championships held in Kavarna, Bulgaria. He finished in 64th place.

In 2014, he finished in 8th place in the men's marathon at the 2014 Asian Games held in Incheon, South Korea.
