= Mulu Seboka =

Ethiopian long-distance runner

Mulu Seboka Seyfu (born 25 September 1984) is an Ethiopian long-distance runner who competes mainly in marathons. She represented Ethiopia in the marathon at the 2005 World Championships in Athletics and in the half marathon at the 2006 IAAF World Road Running Championships. She has won marathons on four continents and holds a personal best of 2:21:56 hours.

== Career ==
She had her first significant win at the Valencia Marathon in 2003. She dipped under two hours forty minutes for the distance at the Maratona di Sant'Antonio in 2004 and had her second win at the Mumbai Marathon a year later. She knocked over four minutes off her best at the 2005 London Marathon, recording 2:30:54 hours to place ninth. In 2006, she defended her Mumbai title and improved to 2:30:41 hours at the Nagoya Women's Marathon, finishing ninth at the high calibre race. A personal best of 2:30:03.2 hours was enough to secure a third career win in Mumbai in 2008 and at the Toronto Waterfront Marathon she became the first woman to win in under two and a half hours, with her course record time of 2:29:05.9 hours.

Mulu failed in her defence of her Toronto title, as compatriot Amane Gobena bettered her course record, leaving her as the runner-up. She had three straight wins in the second half of 2010, topping the field at the Trierer Stadauf, City to Surf marathon, and the Melbourne Marathon. She competed mainly over shorter distances in 2011 and won at the Cincinnati Half Marathon, Savannah Half Marathon, and Tulsa Run.

A run of 2:25:45 hours at the 2012 Dubai Marathon marked a four-minute improvement for her, although the fast race meant she was outside the top ten. She had runner-up finishes at the Daegu Marathon and Grandma's Marathon that year and won twice in Turkey, taking the Darıca Half Marathon and Istanbul 15K. She closed 2012 with her fastest win yet – 2:26:46 at the Guangzhou Marathon. She gave consistent marathon performances after this point: she recorded 2:23:43 hours as Daegu runner-up in 2013 then had a four-race unbeaten streak taking in the Jakarta Marathon, Dubai Marathon, Daegu Marathon and Toronto Waterfront Marathon.

In 2015, she tried to defend her Dubai title, but in spite of a new best of 2:21:56 hours, she only finished in sixth place. She had fifth-place finishes at the 2015 Chicago Marathon and the 2016 Dubai Marathon.

== International competitions ==
Year	Competition	Venue	Position	Event	Notes
2005	World Championships	Helsinki, Finland	48th	Marathon	2:53:08
2006	World Half Marathon Championships	Debrecen, Hungary	25th	Half marathon	1:08:59

== Circuit wins ==
=== Marathons ===
- Dubai Marathon: 2014
- Daegu Marathon: 2014
- Jakarta Marathon: 2013
- Guangzhou Marathon: 2012
- City to Surf (Perth): 2010
- Melbourne Marathon: 2010
- Toronto Waterfront Marathon: 2008, 2014
- Mumbai Marathon: 2005, 2006, 2008
- Valencia Marathon: 2003

=== Other distances ===
- Adana Half Marathon: 2013
- Darıca Half Marathon: 2012
- Cincinnati Half Marathon: 2011
- Savannah Half Marathon: 2011
- Trierer Stadtlauf: 2010
- Istanbul 15K: 2012
- Tulsa Run: 2011

== Personal bests ==
- 10K run – 32:42 (2011)
- Half Marathon – 69:11 (2015)
- Marathon – 2:21:56 (2015)
