= Gifu Seiryu Half Marathon =

Annual half marathon road running competition in Gifu, Japan

Coordinates: 35.4414°N 136.7656°E

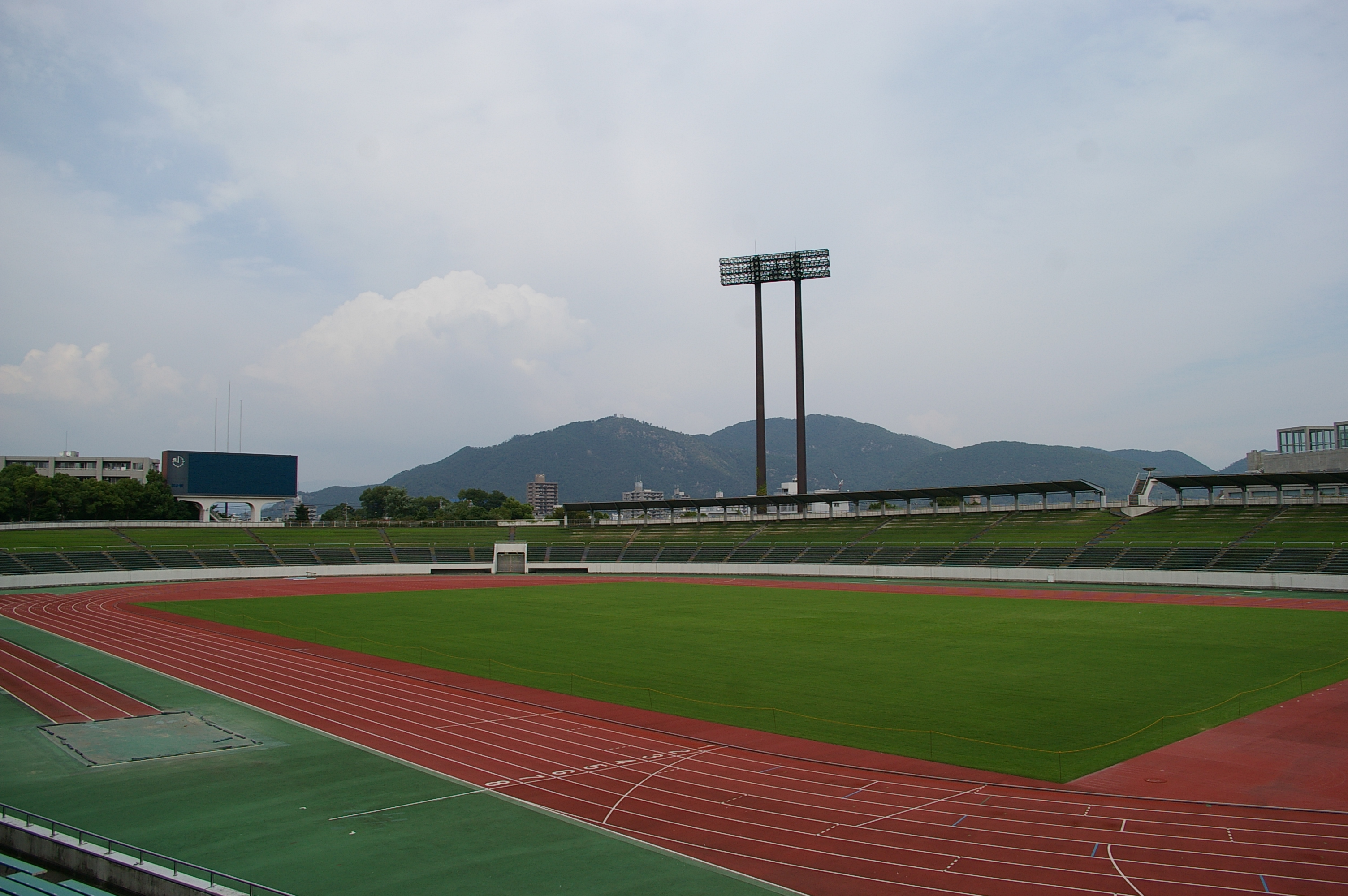
- Gifu Nagaragawa Stadium, the start and finish point of the race
- Date: Mid-April
- Location: Gifu, Japan
- Event type: Road
- Distance: Half marathon
- Primary sponsor: Suzuki
- Established: 2011
- Course records: Men's: 59:56 (2022) (Kenya) Alexander Mutiso; Women's: 1:06:06 (2019) (Kenya) Ruth Chepng'etich
- Website: Gifu Seiryu Half Marathon
- Participants: 459 finishers (2022); 406 finishers (2019)

The Gifu Seiryu Half Marathon (ぎふ清流ハーフマラソン) is an annual half marathon road running competition held in May in Gifu, Japan.

First held in 2011, the race is also called the Naoko Takahashi Cup (高橋尚子杯, Takahashi Naoko Hai), named after Naoko Takahashi, the retired local runner who won the marathon at the 2000 Sydney Olympics and broke the marathon world record in 2001, becoming the first woman to complete the distance in under two hours and twenty minutes. The first edition featured top level and popular sections for the half marathon as well as a shorter 3-kilometre fun run. All the funds raised during the event went towards the reconstruction effort following the 2011 Tōhoku earthquake and tsunami. Some 9000 people took part in the inaugural event including elite Kenyan runners Martin Mathathi and Catherine Ndereba.

The 2012 edition of the race attracted greater numbers of elite runners, both international and Japanese. Mathathi won for a second time while South Africa's René Kalmer won the women's race. In 2013 the race gained IAAF Bronze Label status and attracted six-time World Half Marathon champion Zersenay Tadese, who set a course record of 60:31 minutes to dethrone Mathathi. Mestawet Tufa knocked three minutes of the women's course record with her run of 70:03 minutes. In 2015 Eunice Kirwa improved the women's course record to 69:37 minutes.

The course for the competition starts and finishes at the Gifu Nagaragawa Stadium. It has a single-looped format and mainly follows the Nagara River in the north and central parts of the city. The first section of the race heads south for 4 km, passing through the Yanagase shopping district, until it reaches the Golden Statue of Oda Nobunaga beside Gifu Station. The course then returns north and, upon reaching the river, takes a 6 km-long route going east alongside the river, passing Mount Kinka and Gifu Castle. The course then crosses Tidori Bridge into the Nagara-Furutsu district and heads back west before finally ending up at the stadium.

The 2020 edition was cancelled due to the COVID-19 pandemic.

== Past winners ==
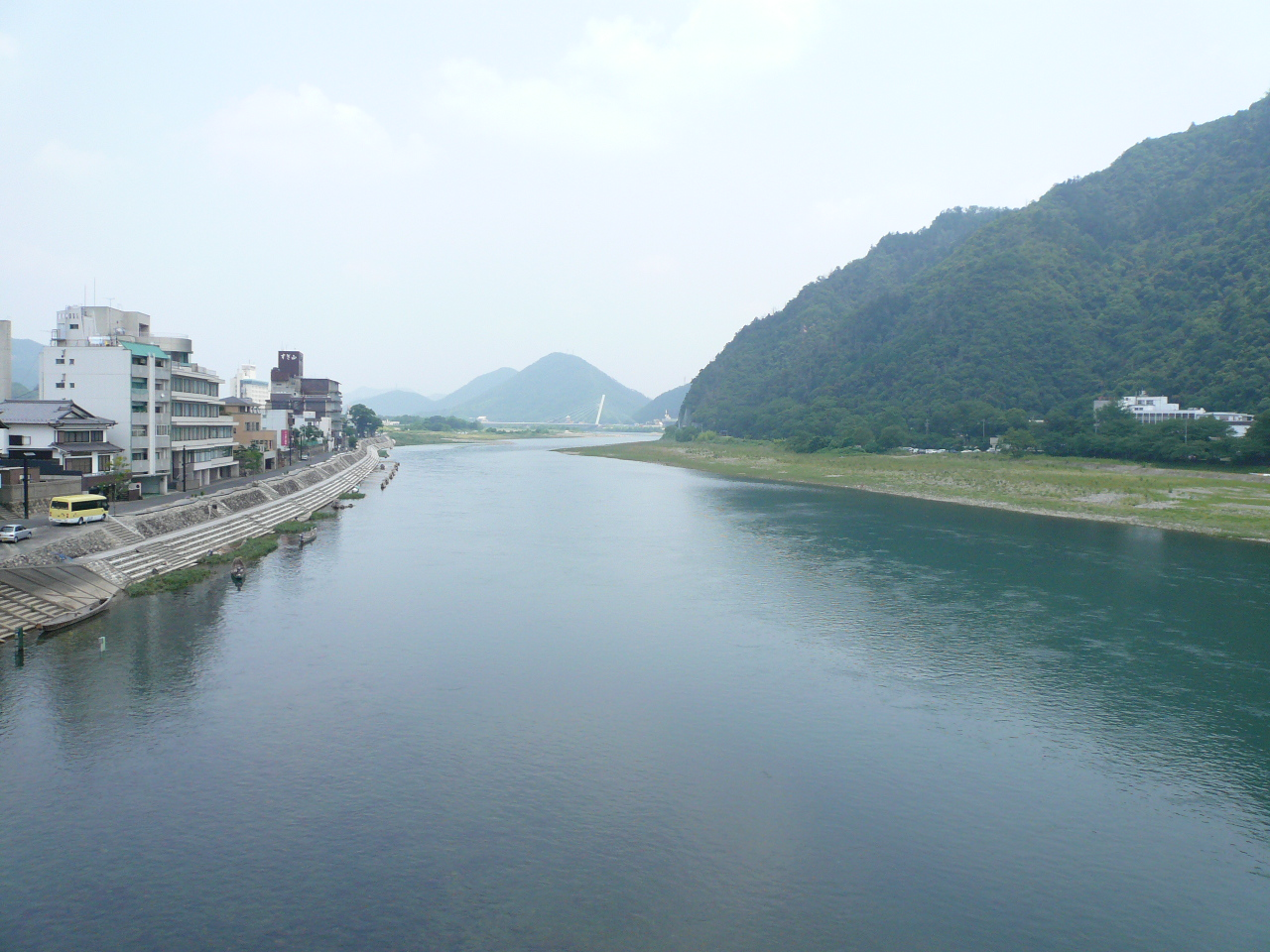
The Nagara River at the heart of the inner-city course

Key: Course record

Edition	Year	Men's winner	Time (h:m:s)	Women's winner	Time (h:m:s)
1st	2011	Martin Mathathi (KEN)	1:00:47	Mao Kuroda (JPN)	1:13:45
2nd	2012	Martin Mathathi (KEN)	1:01:29	René Kalmer (RSA)	1:13:02
3rd	2013	Zersenay Tadese (ERI)	1:00:31	Mestawet Tufa (ETH)	1:10:03
4th	2014	Bedan Karoki (KEN)	1:00:02	Visiline Jepkesho (KEN)	1:10:53
5th	2015	James Rungaru (KEN)	1:02:21	Eunice Kirwa (BHR)	1:09:37
6th	2016	Patrick Mwaka (KEN)	1:01:51	Eunice Kirwa (BHR)	1:08:55
7th	2017	Alexander Mutiso (KEN)	1:00:57	Joyciline Jepkosgei (KEN)	1:07:44
8th	2018	Nicholas Kosimbei (KEN)	1:01:12	Degitu Azmeraw (ETH)	1:09:53
9th	2019	Amos Kurgat (KEN)	1:00:34	Ruth Chepng'etich (KEN)	1:06:06
–	2020	cancelled due to COVID-19 pandemic in Japan			
–	2021	cancelled due to COVID-19 pandemic in Japan			
10th	2022	Alexander Mutiso (KEN)	59:56	Dolphine Omare (KEN)	1:08:13
11th	2023	Amos Kurgat (KEN)	1:00:20	Dolphine Omare (KEN)	1:08:18
12th	2024	Hillary Kipkoech (KEN)	1:01:26	Stella Chesang (UGA)	1:07:59

== See also ==
- Kagawa Marugame Half Marathon
- Sapporo Half Marathon
