= Flag Art Exhibition in Gifu =

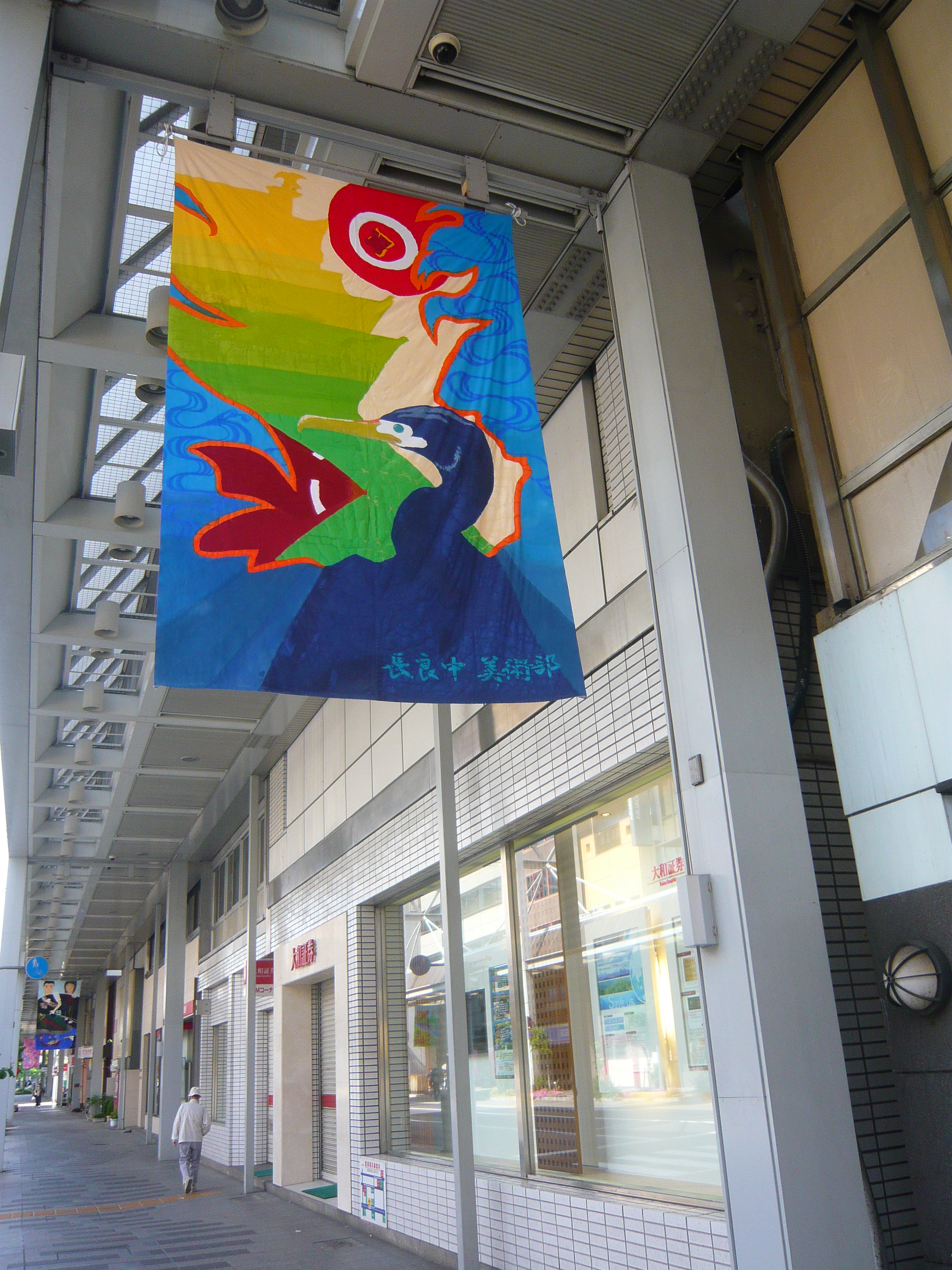
2008 Children's Exhibition depicting Cormorant Fishing on the Nagara River

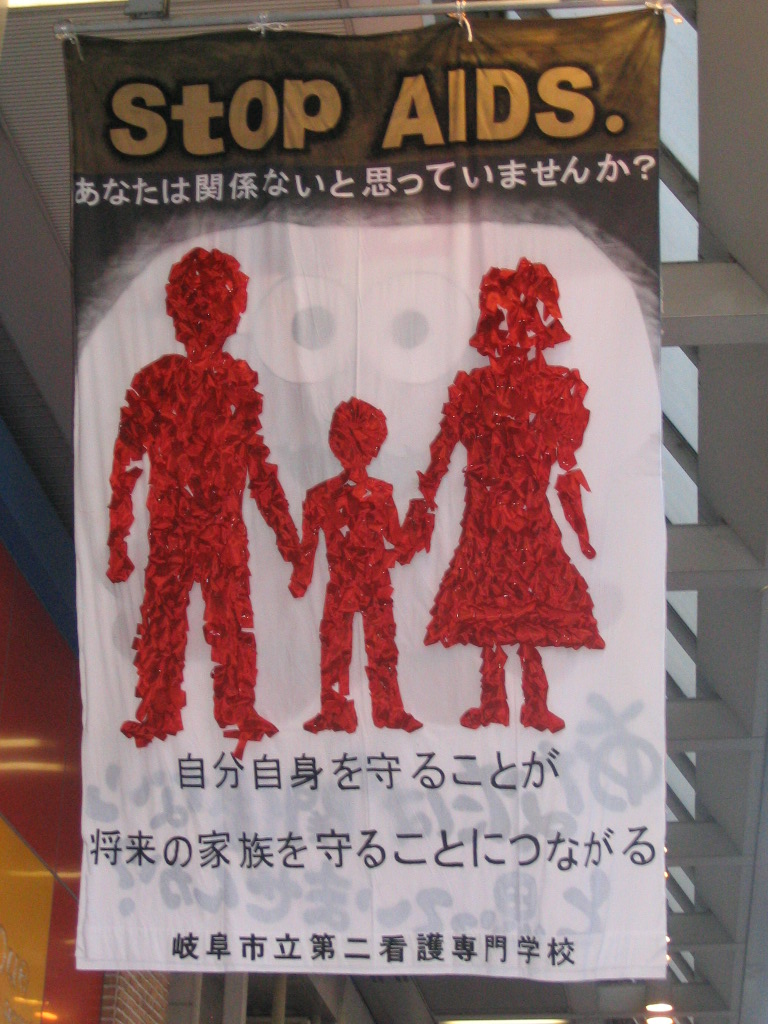
A 2006 AIDS awareness flag

Flag Art Exhibitions in Gifu (岐阜フラッグアート展, Gifu Furaggu Aato-ten) is an art exhibition that take place at various times throughout the year in Gifu, Gifu Prefecture, Japan. The exhibition spaces takes place along the main street between JR Gifu Station and the Yanagase shopping district.

All of the exhibition pieces are made out of flags measuring 3 m (9.8 ft) in height and 1.8 m (5.9 ft) in width, which are then hung from the arcade over the sidewalks. This was the first flag art event in Japan and has been occurring yearly since 1997.

== Outline ==
The exhibition is held three times throughout the year for different purposes. The first exhibition of the year is the Children's Exhibition in the spring, which is aimed towards elementary and junior high school students in the city. The second exhibition in the Message Exhibition in summer, in which all of the flags focus on an area event or tourist destination. The final exhibition is the Public Exhibition in the fall, during which artists throughout the country submit works in a competition; the head judge is Katsuhiko Hibino (日比野 克彦 Hibino Katsuhiko).

== History ==
In 1996, the city of Gifu completed a covered shopping arcade 6 m (20 ft) and 2 km (1 mi) over its downtown shopping area. To commemorate the event, artwork was hung from flags measuring 3 m (9.8 ft) in height and 1.8 m (5.9 ft) in width. The city decided to continue the event in 1997 with the First Annual Flag Art Exhibition in Gifu. In 2006, the 11th annual exhibition received the grand prize at the Furusato Event Competition.
