= Abeno Cues Town =

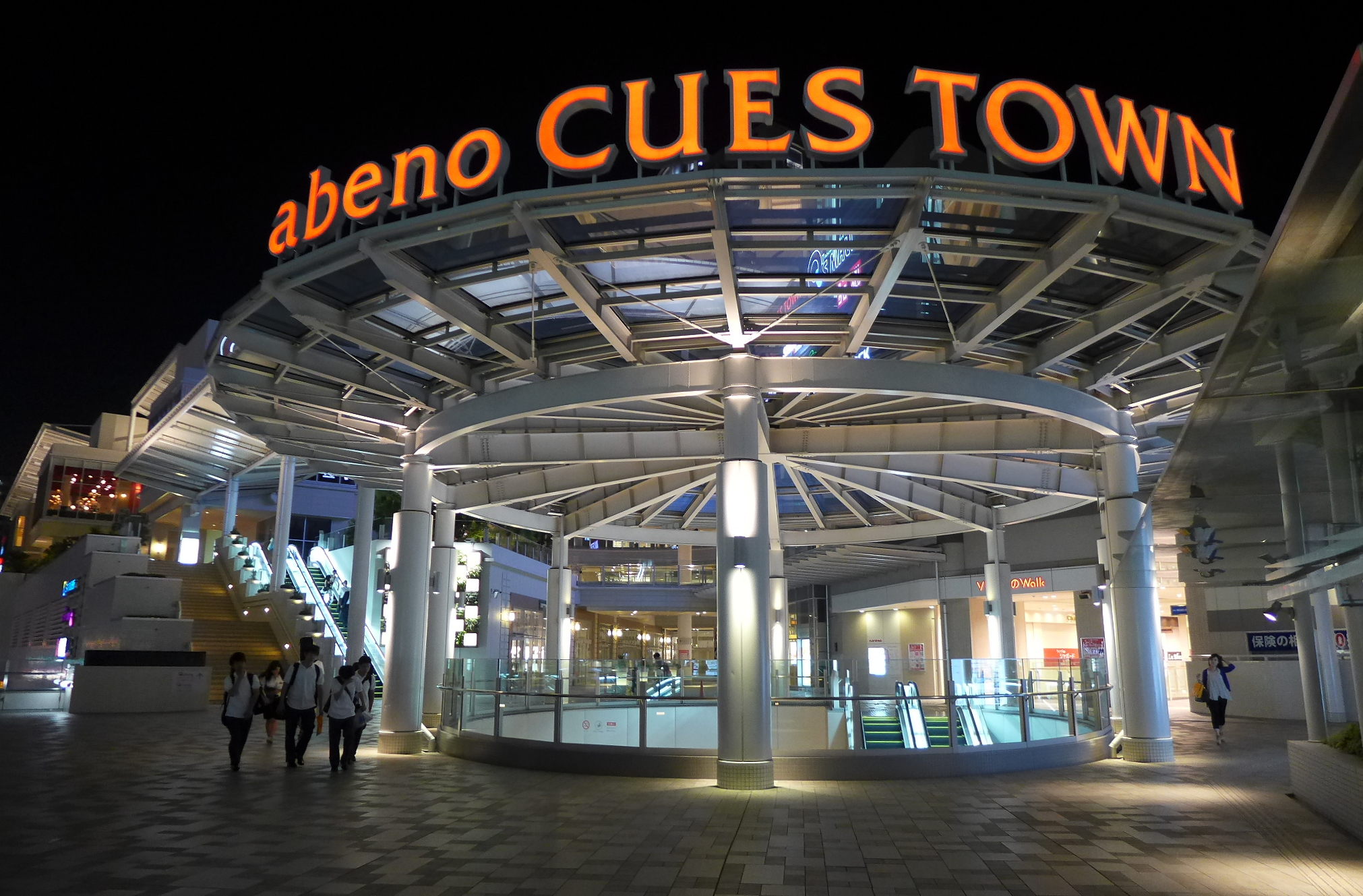
- Abeno Cues Town in 2014
- Location: Abeno-ku, Osaka, Japan
- Coordinates: 34°38′41.90″N 135°30′41.70″E
- Address: Abenosuji
- Opened: April 26, 2011
- Developer: Tokyu Land Corporation
- Manager: Tokyu Land SC Management Corporation
- Num. of stores: 320
- Num. of anchor tenants: 3 (Ito Yokado, Tokyu Hands, Shibuya 109 Abeno)
- Floor area: 69,000 m^{2} (740,000 sq ft)
- Floors: 8 (6 on the ground and 2 underground)
- Website: viaabenowalk.jp qs-mall.jp

Abeno Cues Town (あべのキューズタウン) is the name of the Abeno A1 Area Urban Redevelopment Project A2 Building (阿倍野A1地区第二種市街地再開発事業A2棟, Abeno A1 Chiku Dainishu Shigaichi Saikaihatsu Jigyō A2 Tō) in Abeno-ku, Osaka, Japan.

== Overview ==
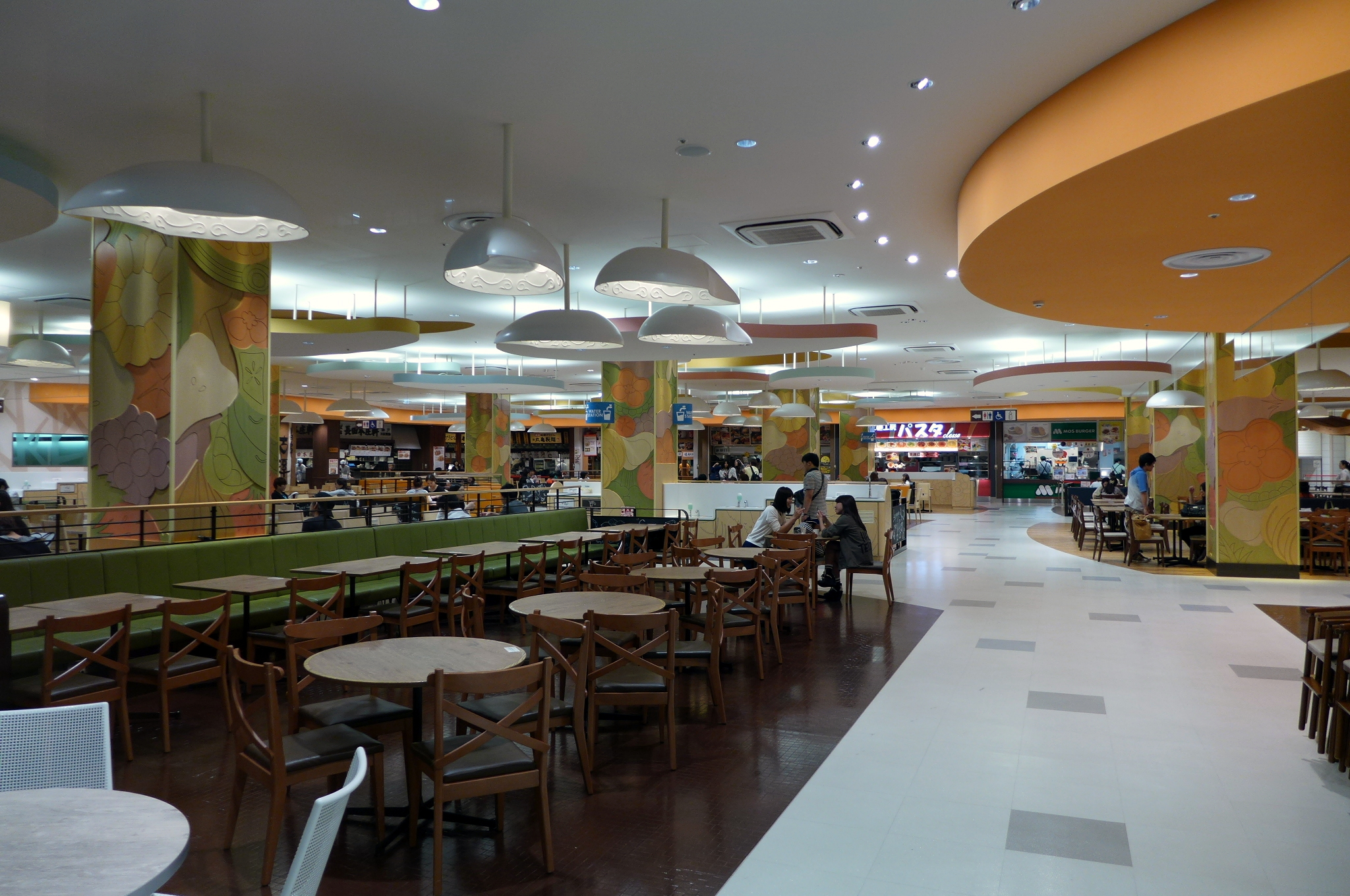
Food Court

Abeno Cues Town consists of Via Abeno Walk (ViaあべのWalk) and Abeno Q's Mall (あべのキューズモール; formerly Abeno Market Park Q's Mall (あべのマーケットパーク Q's Mall) till September 30, 2013). Via Abeno Walk is the area for the local tenants, and Q's Mall is the area the specific architect, Tokyu Land Corporation, manages. The area opened on April 26, 2011.

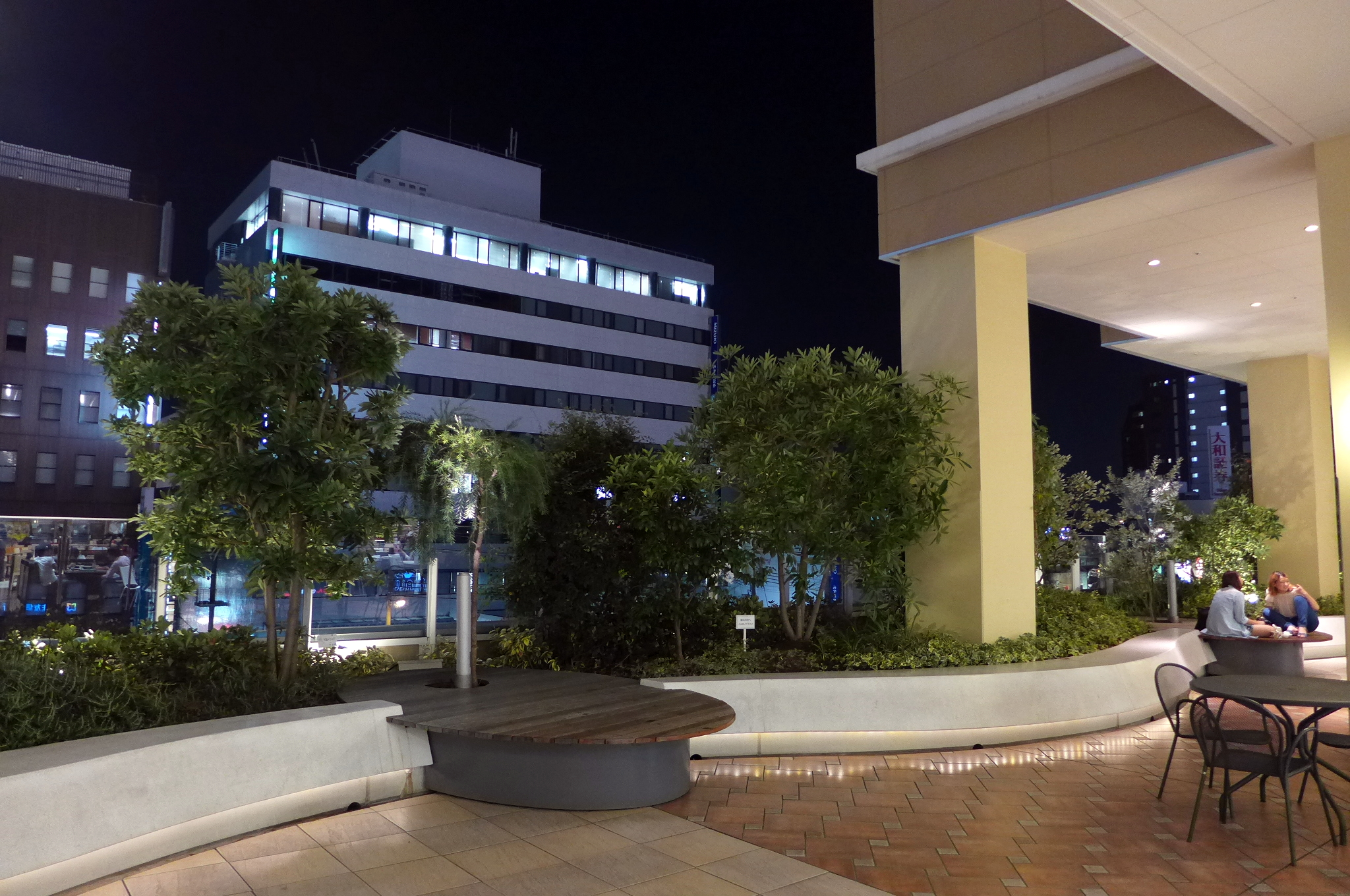
Outdoor garden outside the mall

This shopping area is connected to Tennoji Station operated by Osaka Metro by the underground passage. The area is connected to the pedestrian bridge (pre-opened on February 1, 2012, and completed on April 24, 2013) via the Abeno A1 Area Urban Redevelopment Project A1-2 Building (Abeno nini) opened on February 1, 2012 along with the elevated walkway between Cues Town and Abeno nini. The other passage was opened on March 15, 2014 to connect to Abeno Station on the Osaka Metro Tanimachi Line.

== Access ==
- Osaka Metro: Tennoji Station (Midosuji Line, Tanimachi Line), Abeno Station (Tanimachi Line)
- JR West: Tennoji Station (Yamatoji Line, Osaka Loop Line, Hanwa Line)
- Kintetsu Minami Osaka Line: Osaka Abenobashi Station
- Hankai Uemachi Line: Tennoji-ekimae

== Surrounding area ==
=== Abeno-ku ===
- Abeno Urban Redevelopment Project
  - Abeno Lucias (A1-1 Building)
  - Abeno nini (A1-2 Building) - connection with the elevated walkway
  - Abeno Gran Tour (A3 Building)
  - Abeno Belta (B1 Building)
    - Kansai Super
- Abenobashi Terminal Building
  - Kintetsu Department Store Main Store Abeno Harukas
  - Osaka Mariott Miyako Hotel
  - Harukas 300
  - Tennoji Miyako Hotel
- Hoop
- and
- Shinjuku Building
- Shinjuku Gochiso Building
- Abeno Center Building (Abeno Festa)
- Abeno Apollo
- Echo Across Building (Animate)

=== Tennoji-ku ===
- Tennoji Mio
  - Main Building
  - Plaza Building
- Abechika (underground city)

== See also ==
- List of shopping malls in Japan
