= City to Surf =

City to Surf may refer to:

- City2Surf (Sydney), a road race held in Sydney, Australia
- City to Surf (Perth), a road race held in Perth, Australia
