= Adana Half Marathon =

Running event in Adana, Turkey

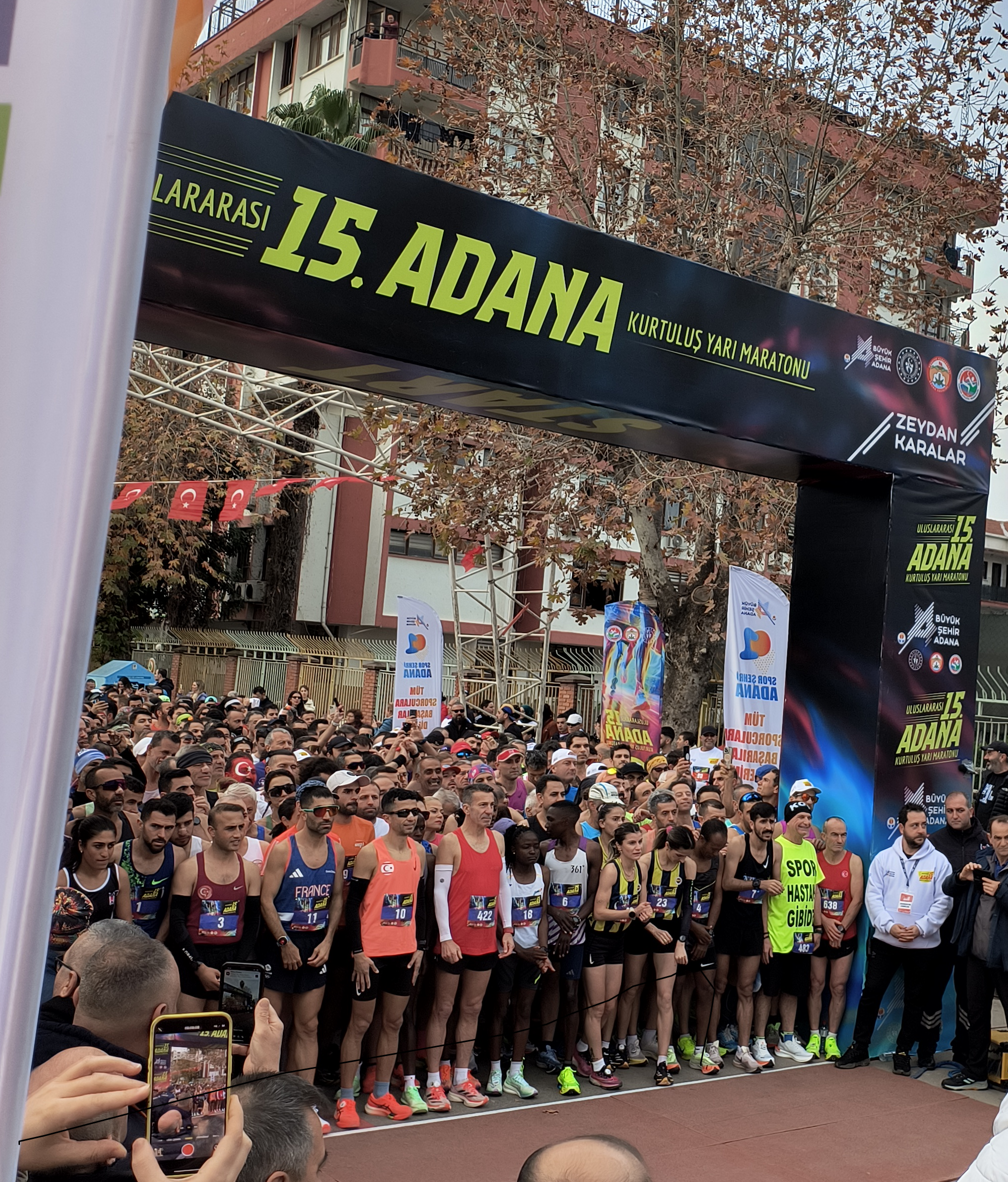
- Marathon Start
- Date: First Sunday following January 1st
- Location: Adana, Turkey
- Event type: Road
- Distance: Half Marathon
- Primary sponsor: Adana Metropolitan Municipality
- Established: 2011
- Course records: Men: 1:00:46 (2016) (Kenya) Barselius Kipyego; Women: 1:08:42 (2018) (Kenya) Diana Chemtai
- Website: Adana Half Marathon
- Participants: 888 finishers (2025); 738 men 150 women

Adana Half Marathon (Turkish: Adana Kurtuluş Yarı Maratonu) is an IAAF international athletic event that takes place in Adana annually since 2011. The marathon is organized the first Sunday following January 1st. 21K Master Men, 21K Master Women, 10K Men, 10K Women, as well as 4 km Public Run are held during the event. 10 age categories are also awarded at the 21K and 10K competitions from 35-39 to 80+.

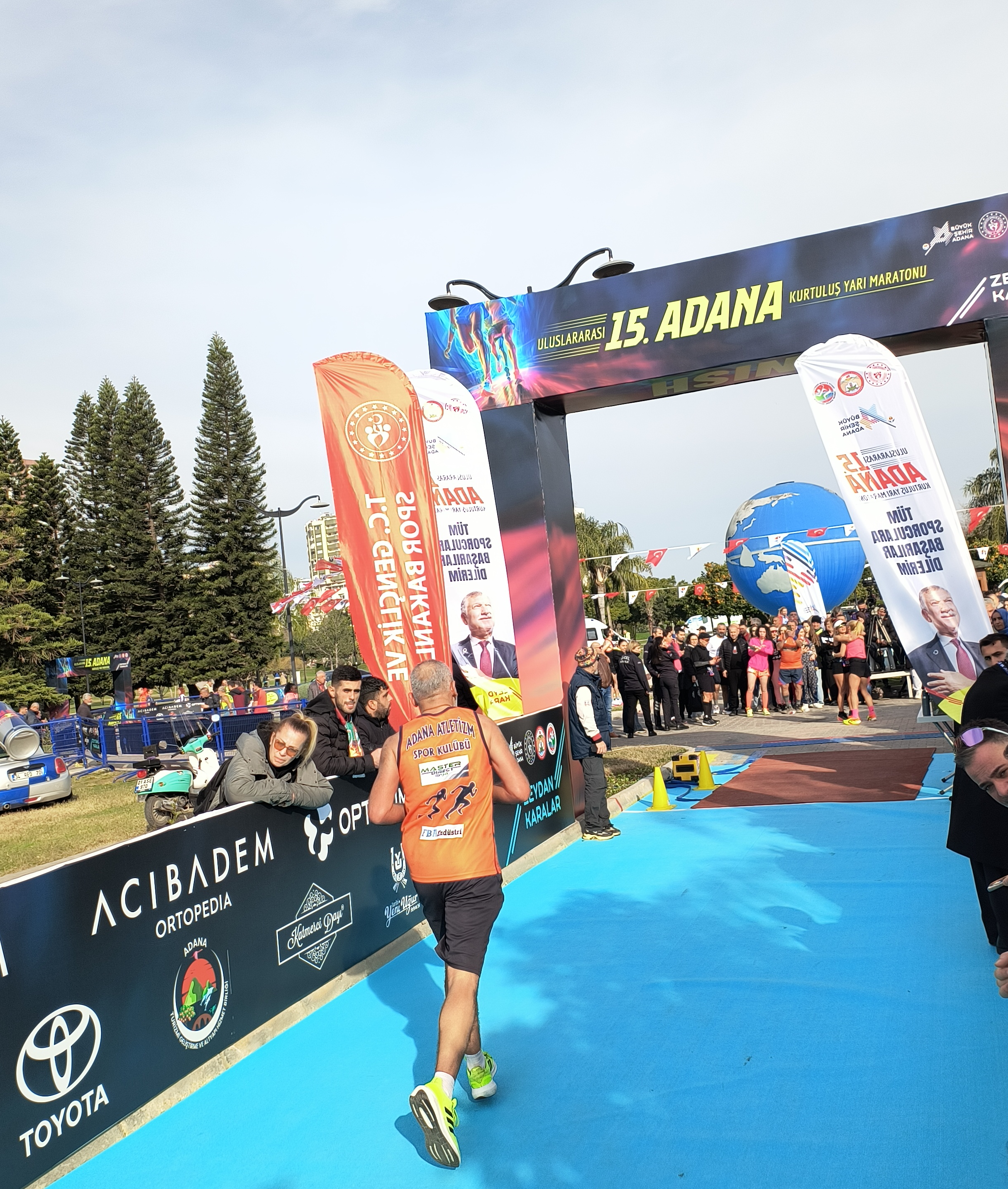
Finish

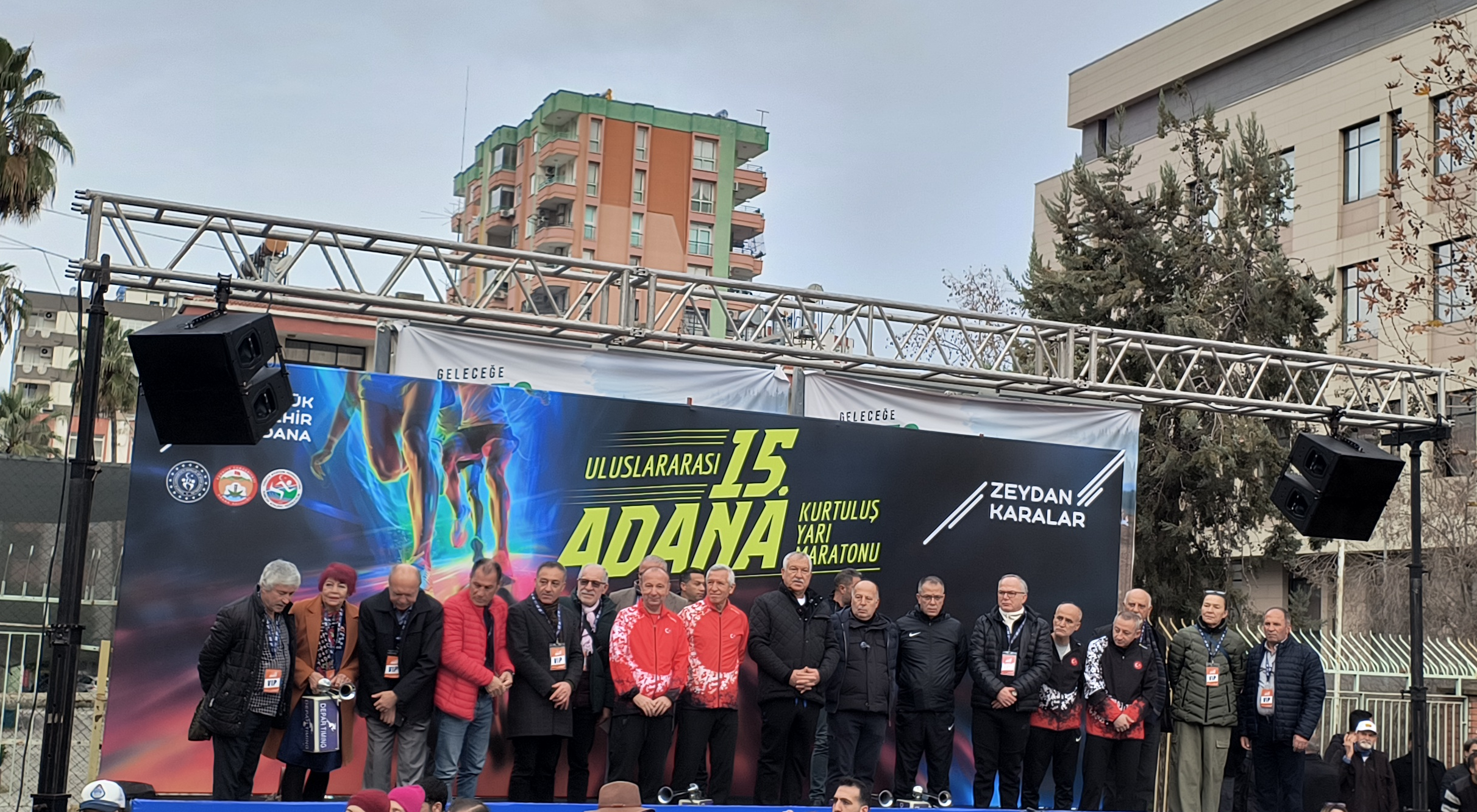
Race Committee

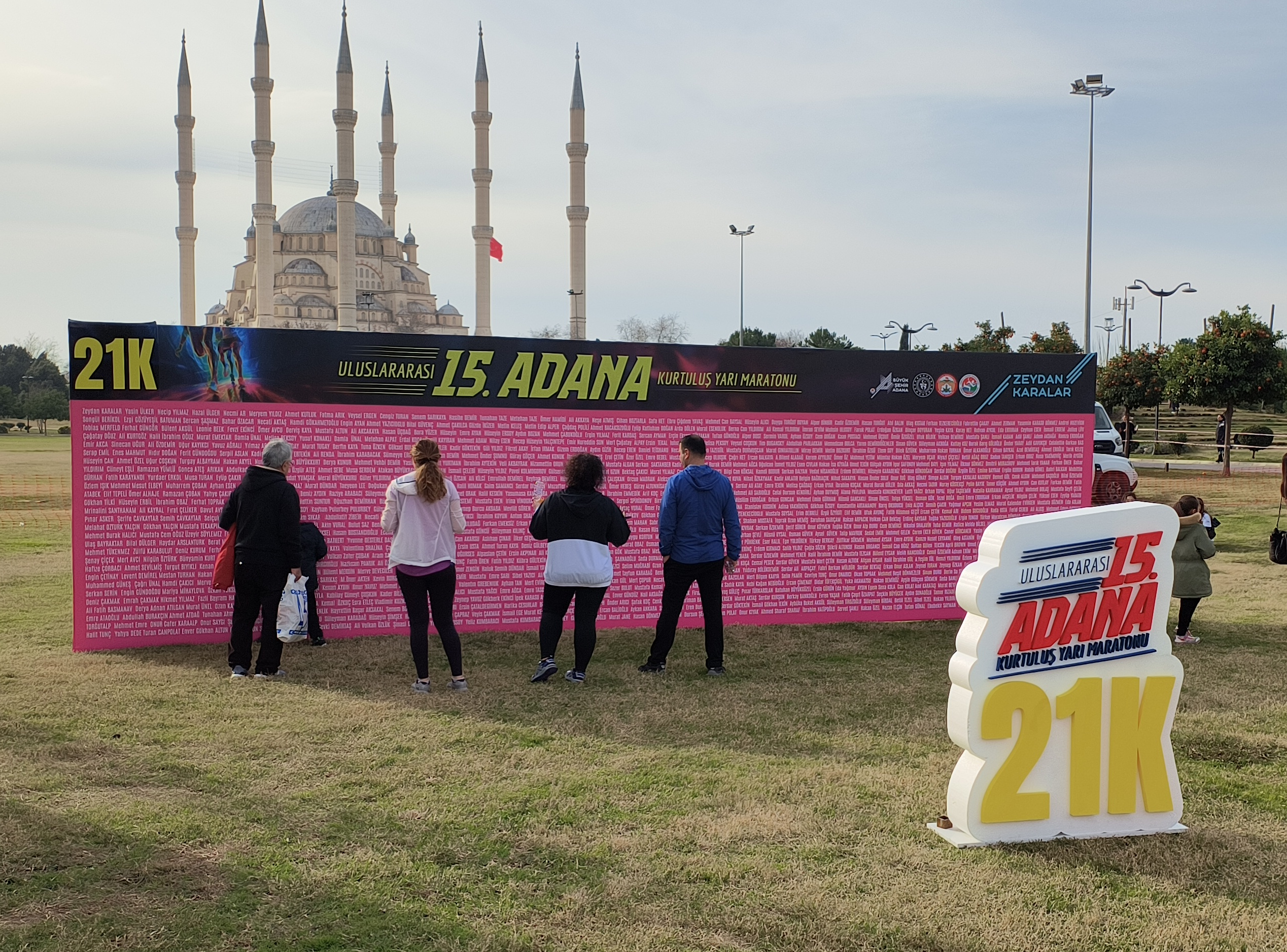
21K Race Podium

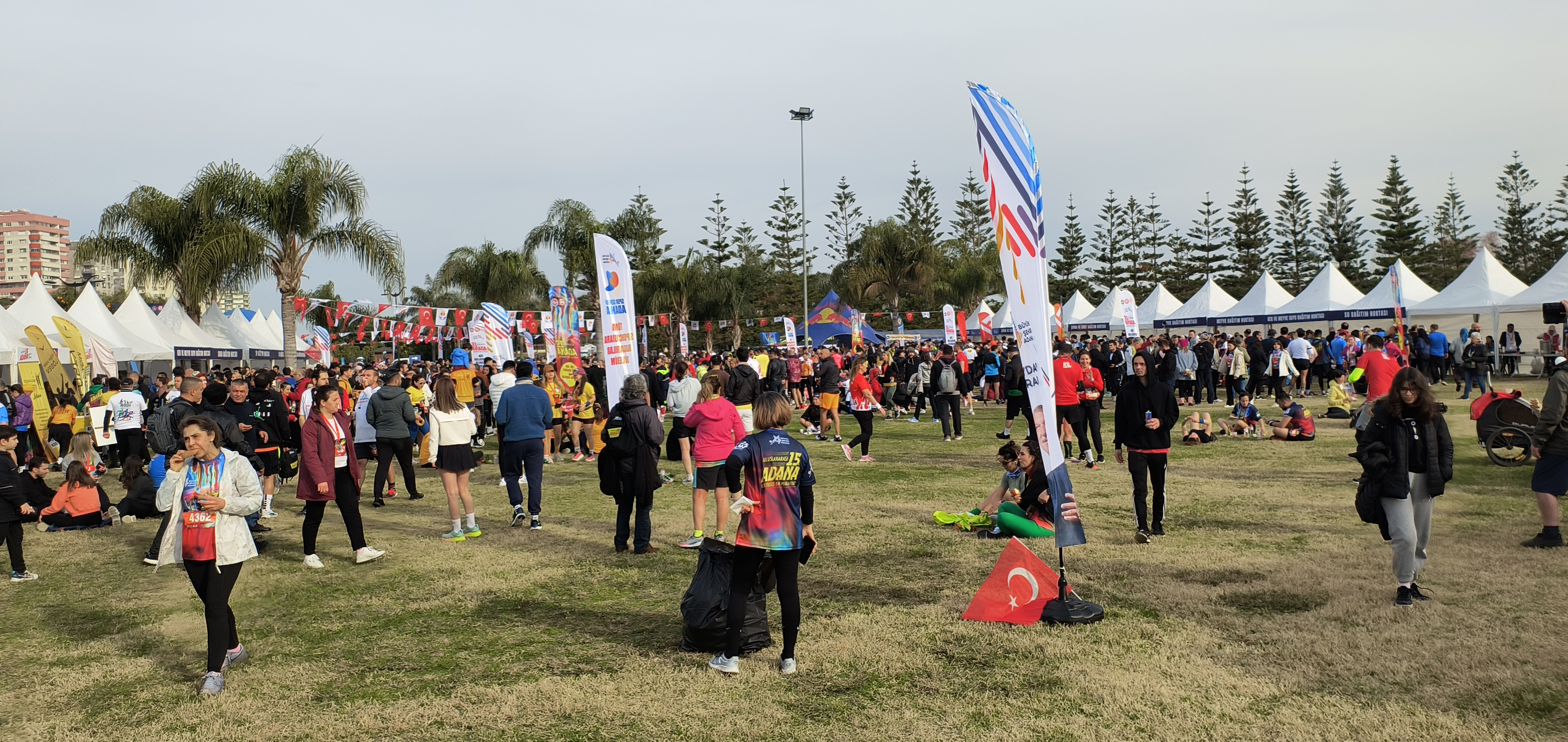
Resting area

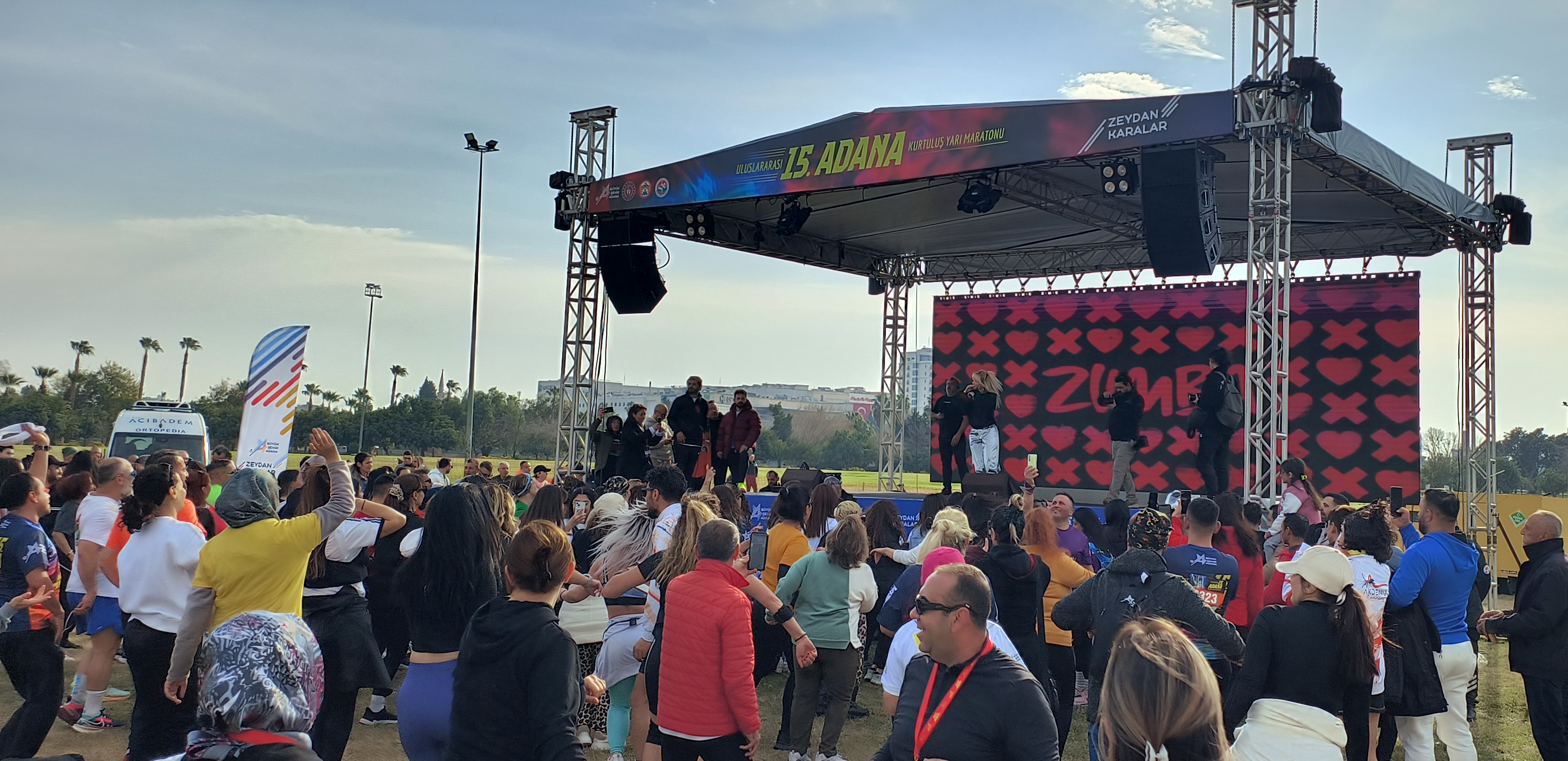
Post-marathon Zumba

== History ==
The first marathon was held on 9 January 2011 on a national level with the participation of 223 athletese. A total of 10.700TL awarded to the winners. Public Run is conducted on a 4 km course with 750 participants.

In 2012, the marathon gained IAAF International Marathon status and took place on January 8 with some changes to the race course. 610 athletes from 10 nations raced at the half marathon. Due to the rain, participation to the 4 km Public Run was lower than last year. The half marathon started from Atatürk Park and headed north to Central Train Station, then south on Ziyapaşa boulevard, turning east just south of the Atatürk Park, heading to the old town streets, crossing Taşköprü, returning to Seyhan district, going north along the both banks of the river and returning to Merkez Park and ending at the park center. The total prize given to winners in 2012 was raised to 35000TL. Winners of Master Men and Master Women races both received 5000TL, winners of Wheelchair men and women races received 750TL each. 4 km Public Run also started from Atatürk Park and ended in Merkez Park. Participants for the Public Run were awarded with certificates. 2012 race for men's was dominated by international athletes though the results were not better than last year. Among the women, Bahar Doğan again won the title and also breaking marathon record for women.

== Race results ==
Half marathon winners at men and women categories for each year:
Key: Course record

Edition	Year	Men's winner	Time (h:m:s)	Women's winner	Time (h:m:s)
15th	2025	Hüseyin Can (TUR)	1:04:53	Christine Kioko (KEN)	1:12:00
14th	2024	James Kipkogei Kipkoech (KEN)	1:01:53	Ruth Jebet (BRN)	1:11:55
13th	2023	Isaac Kibet Chebuyo (KEN)	1:02:28	Daisyjeptoo Kimele (KEN)	1:11:22
12th	2022	Emmanuel Bor (KEN)	1:01:39	Daisyjeptoo Kimele (KEN)	1:13:42
11th	2021	Sezgin Ataç (TUR)	1:03:47	Yayla Kiliç (TUR)	1:13:48
10th	2020	Joseph Karanja (KEN)	1:01:14	Irene Kimais (KEN)	1:09:01
9th	2019	Vincent Kipchumba (KEN)	1:02:12	Joyce Tele (KEN)	1:11:20
8th	2018	Felix Kibitok (KEN)	1:01:50	Diana Chemtai (KEN)	1:08:42
7th	2017	Belay Tilahun (ETH)	1:03:34	Ruth Chepngetich (KEN)	1:09:06
6th	2016	Barselius Kipyego (KEN)	1:00:46	Ababel Yeshaneh (ETH)	1:09:36
5th	2015	Barselius Kipyego (KEN)	1:00:51	Rose Chelimo (KEN)	1:08:53
4th	2014	Moussaab Hadout (MAR)	1:04:10	Tsenga Tsehaynesh (MAR)	1:17:28
3rd	2013	Chakir Boujattaoui (MAR)	1:04:13	Mulu Seboka (ETH)	1:11:09
2nd	2012	Mert Girmalegesse (TUR)	1:08:04	Bahar Doğan (TUR)	1:16:18
1st	2011	Murat Ertaş (TUR)	1:06:47	Bahar Doğan (TUR)	1:20:49
