= 109 (department store) =

Japanese department store chain

Coordinates: 35°39′34.36″N 139°41′56.44″E

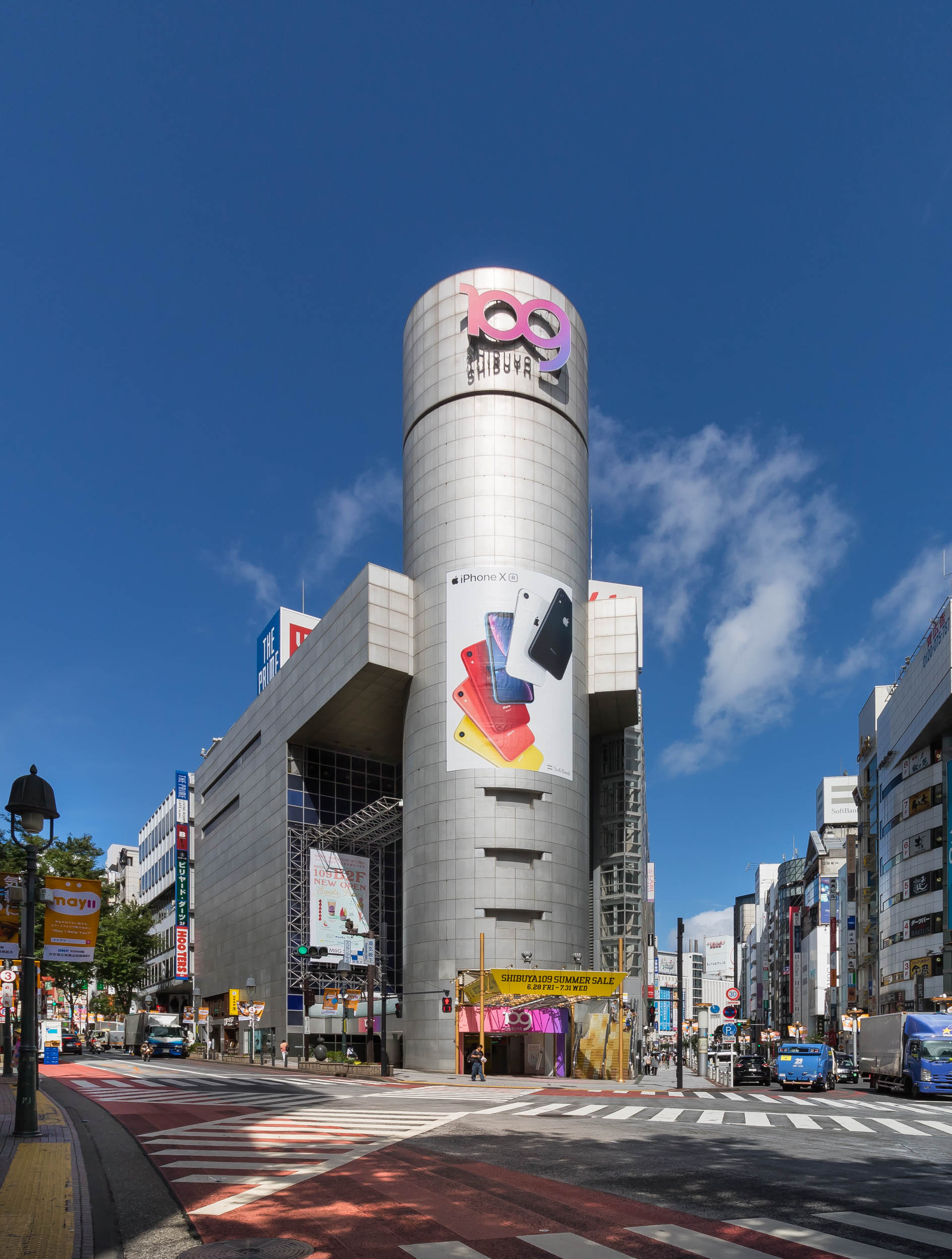
Shibuya 109

109 (Ichi-maru-kyū) is a department store in Shibuya, Tokyo, Japan. The store is operated by SHIBUYA109 Entertainment Corporation, a subsidiary of the Tokyu Group.

== History and description ==
The building, located just across the street from Shibuya Station, opened in April 1979. The architect was Minoru Takeyama. Tokyu, the building's operator, designed the building as a "Fashion Community" containing small retail stores targeting the early-30s female consumer. Tokyu intended the store to compete with Seibu Department Stores, which was making inroads into the Shibuya area.

The name of the building, 109, is a form of word play (goroawase, specifically numerical substitution) and is taken from the Japanese characters tō (meaning 10) and kyū (9) as in Tōkyū. The numbers 10 and 9 also signified the operating hours, which was 10 a.m. to 9 p.m. The interior of the building is designed to move shoppers in a loop on each floor from the elevators past various shops. A movie theater was originally planned for the top floor, but the fire department would not grant approval due to emergency-evacuation routes not meeting appropriate standards. Although originally targeted at women in their 30s, the building later became more known as a sanctuary for young women from the gyaru subculture.

The original emoji set from SoftBank Mobile (as used by iOS prior to the Unicode emoji standardisation) included one for Shibuya 109,. As a corporate icon, it was not assigned a standard Unicode code point, but it continues to be supported by Twemoji at its location in SoftBank's Private Use Area.

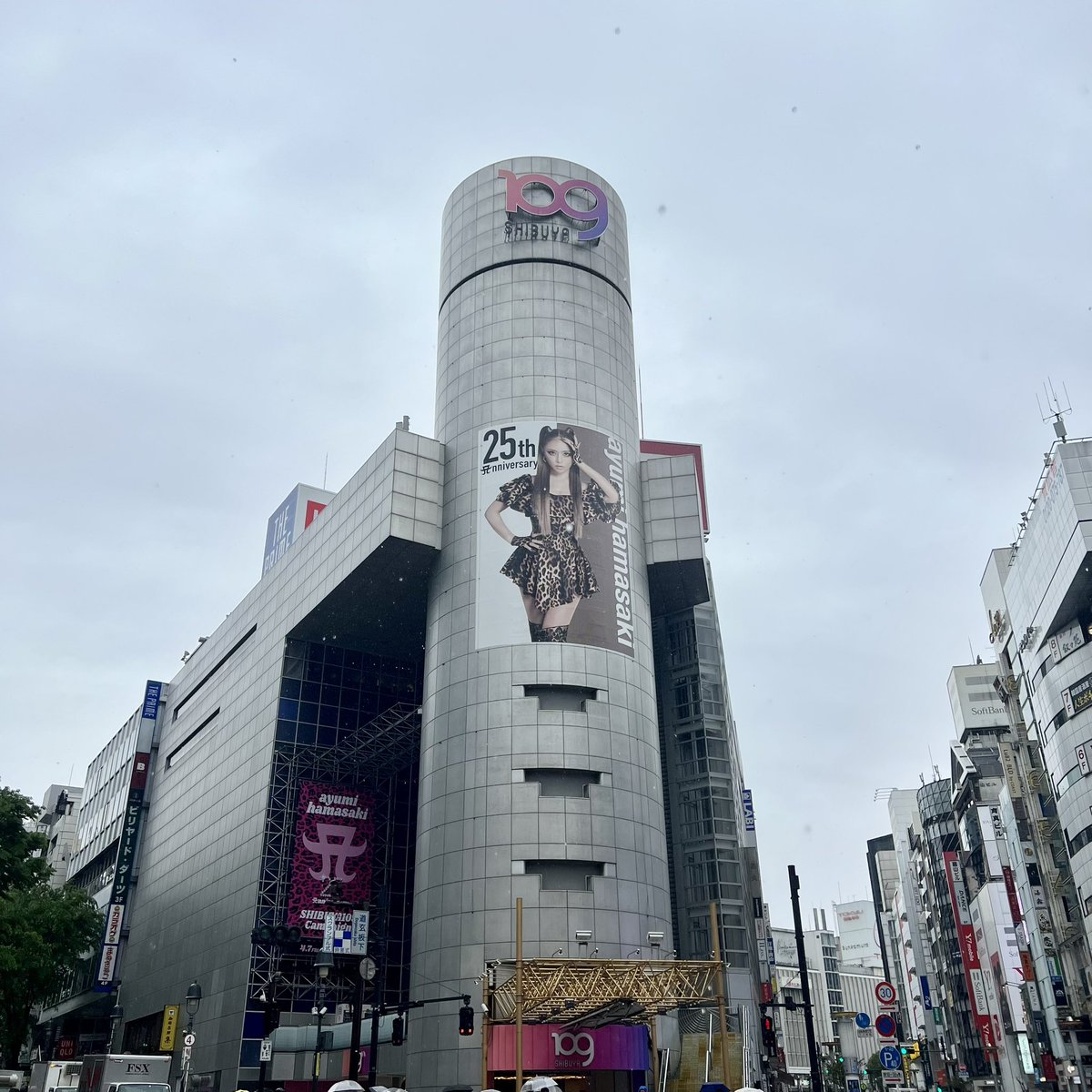
Shibuya 109's collaboration with Ayumi Hamasaki, April 2023

Due to its prominent location in Shibuya, the building appears in various Japanese media like anime and video games; however, since 109 is a trademarked brand, the number is usually altered.

=== Collaboration with Ayumi Hamasaki ===
In April 2023, the 109 building was used for Ayumi Hamasaki's "25th Anniversary Shibuya109 Campaign", showcasing the artist both on the tower and through participating stores. Famed for being an inspiration for gyaru culture in the 2000s, Hamasaki collaborated with numerous brands for limited edition clothing, merchandise, and confectionery, along with a playlist of her music being used across the building. A ViVi representative described the event as "a perfect envisioning of Ayu's world", and "a treat for visitors, regardless of whether they're a big fan or not".

== Stores ==
- Shibuya 109 (Shibuya, Tokyo) - April 1979
- MAGNET by Shibuya 109 (Shibuya, Tokyo) - April 2018
  Opened as 109-2 in April 1979, renamed to 109Men's in March 2011 before being renamed once again to its current name.
- Kohrinbo 109 (Kanazawa, Ishikawa) - September 1985
- 109 Machida (Machida, Tokyo) - July 2002 - Closed
- Shizuoka 109 (Shizuoka, Shizuoka) - October 2007
  Created in March 2006 as Shibuya 109 Dreams, later recreated into the current 109.
- Minatomirai 109 (Yokohama) - April 2010
- Shibuya 109 Abeno (Osaka) - April 2011
