= Bekir Karayel =

Turkish runner (born 1982)

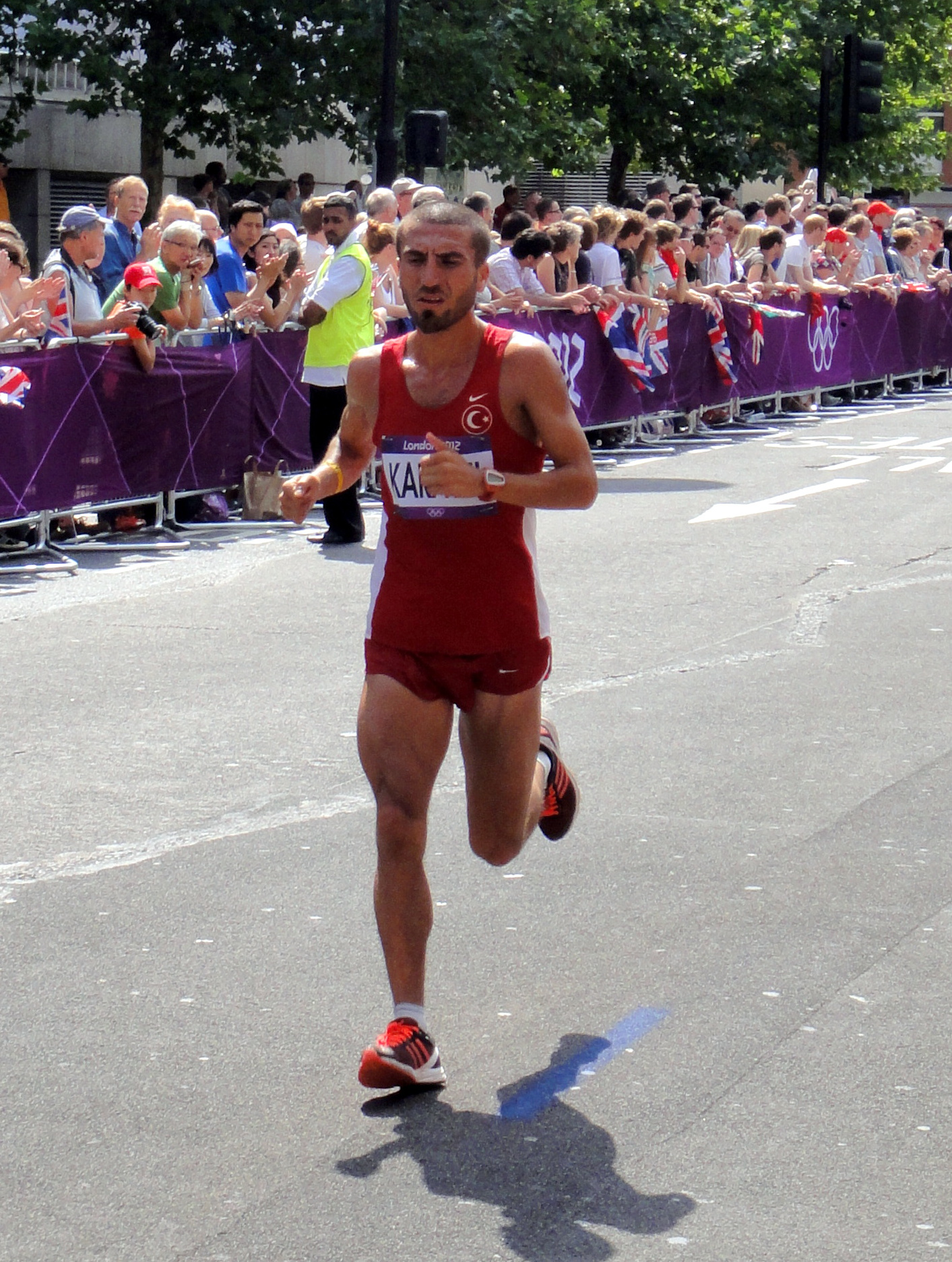

Personal information
- Nationality: Turkey
- Born: 10 May 1982 (age 44) Sungurlu, Çorum Province, Turkey
- Height: 172 cm (5 ft 8 in)
- Weight: 62 kg (137 lb)

Sport
- Sport: Long-distance
- Club: İstanbul Büyükşehir Belediyesi S.K.
- Coached by: Satılmış Atmaca

Achievements and titles
- Personal bests: Half marathon 1:02:55 (2012); Marathon 2:13:21 (2012)

Bekir Karayel (born 10 May 1982 in Sungurlu) is a Turkish middle and long-distance runner, who later specialized in marathon. The 172 cm (5 ft 8 in) tall athlete at 62 kg (137 lb) is a member of İstanbul Büyükşehir Belediyesi S.K., where he is coached by Satılmış Atmaca. He studied at Gazi University.

In 2011, he won the first edition of Darıca Half Marathon in a time 1:05:08.

He qualified for participation in marathon event at the 2012 Summer Olympics and finished in 76th.

== Personal best ==
- 800m - 1:58.55 (2004)
- 1500m - 4:00.33 (2003)
- 2000m - 5:20.74 (2003)
- 3000m - 8:47.49 (2003)
- 10000m - 30:00.88 (2011)
- Half Marathon - 1:02:48 (2014)
- Marathon - 2:13:21 (2012)
