= Jakarta Marathon =

Annual race in Indonesia held since 2013

- Date: Last Sunday of October
- Location: Jakarta, Indonesia
- Event type: Road
- Distance: Marathon, Half marathon
- Primary sponsor: BTN
- Established: 2013 (13 years ago)
- Course records: Men's: 2:14:23 (2019) (Kenya) Geoffrey Birgen; Women's: 2:33:54 (2024) (Kenya) Sheila Chesang
- Website: Official website
- Participants: 31,000 (2025); 14,300 (2022); 1,126 (2019); 804 (2018)

The Jakarta Marathon is a marathon held annually in Jakarta, the capital city of Indonesia in Southeast Asia, since 2013. The marathon is organised by the tourism ministry of Government of Indonesia, and is recognised by the Association of International Marathons and Distance Races (AIMS) and International Athletic Association Federation (IAAF).

The Jakarta Marathon aims to project Jakarta as a "world class" tourist destination, especially in sport tourism, and is regarded as the "biggest running event of Indonesia".

== History ==
The marathon was first held in 2013.

The 2020 edition of the race was cancelled due to the coronavirus pandemic, with all entries automatically transferred to 2021.

After two years of absence due to the pandemic, the marathon was officially held again in 2022. About 14,300 runners participated in the event.

== Course ==
The IAAF recognised the route of Jakarta Marathon as "Grade A". The Full and Half Marathon route passes through various popular landmarks of the city, including National Monument or Monas, the Istiqlal Mosque and the Cathedral across, the Old Batavia and the Fatahillah Square.

The 2015 edition had alternative routes from the earlier two versions because of various construction work. The route of the 2015 version passed through National Monument (Monas), Jalan Imam Bonjol, HR Rasuna Said Street, then turned at Gerbang Pemuda to MH Thamrin Avenue, Jalan Abdul Muis, Jalan Hayam Wuruk, Chinatown, Bank Mandiri Museum, Jalan Gadjah Mada, the Catholic Cathedral, and finished back at the National Monument (Monas).

== Prizes ==
In 2014, the total amount of prize money was Rp 2.4 billion, while in 2015 it was Rp 2.6 billion.

== Other races ==
A half marathon, a 10K run and a 5K run are also held in addition to the full marathon.

There is also a special race for children, called "Maratoonz".

== Management ==
Jakarta Marathon is sponsored by Tourism and Creative Economy Ministry of Indonesia along with Jakarta administration.

PLN, the state electric utility company, was the title sponsor (and the marathon was named "Electric Jakarta Marathon" at the time) while Persatuan Atletik Seluruh Indonesia (PASI) and INSPIRO were among the other partners.

== Participation ==
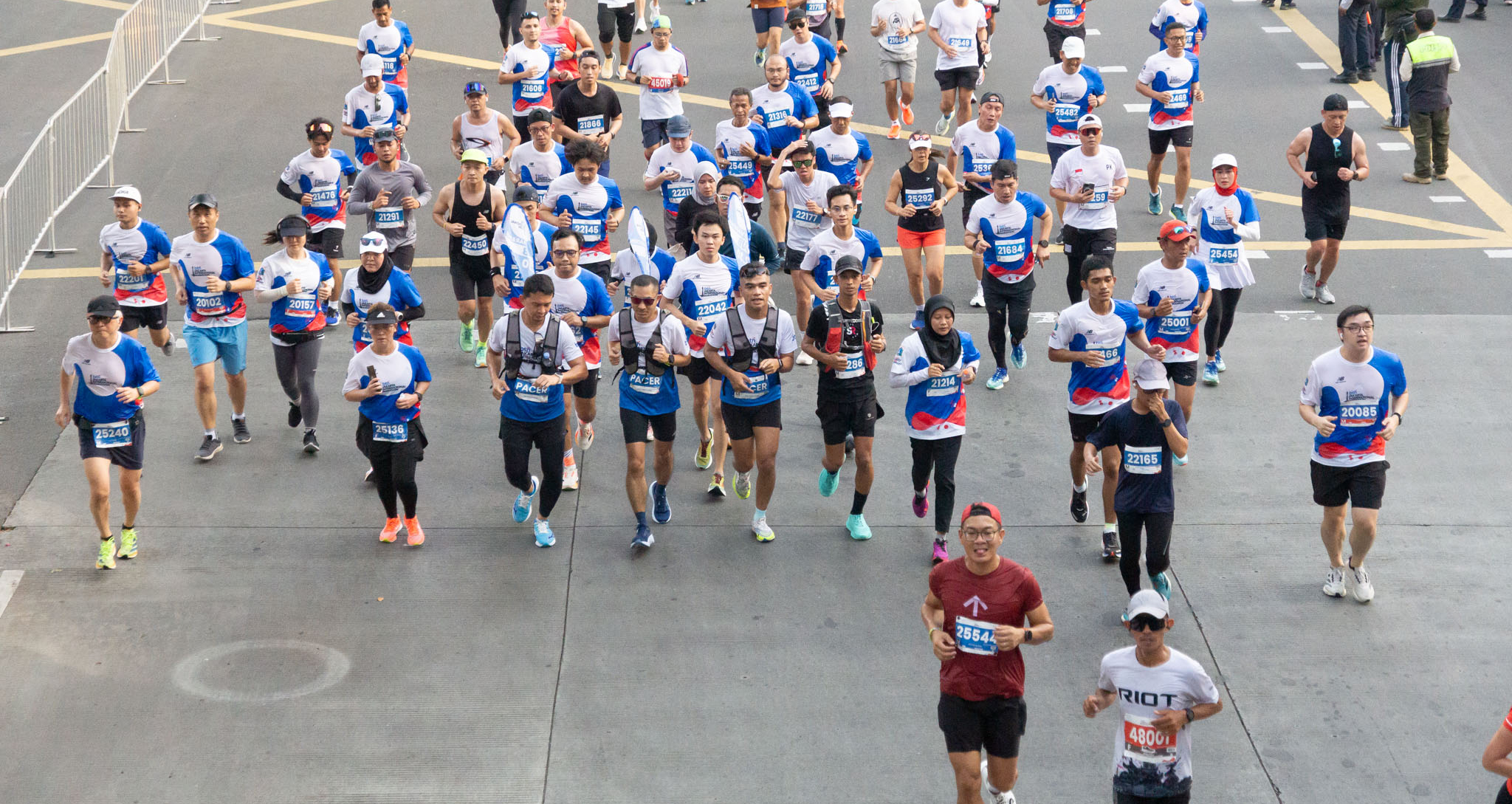
Runners during the 2024 marathon

Around 10,000 people participated in the inaugural 2013 race; participation was increased to around 14,000 in 2014 and around 15,000 from 53 countries in the 2015 edition. Around 14,300 runners participated in the event in 2022.

Among foreign participants, there were the most Japanese runners in the first marathon of 2013. In the 2014 version, a limited number of participants were invited from Africa because of the 2014 Ebola outbreak, and only nine professional runners from East Africa participated in the 2014 edition.

== Winners ==
The list of winners below only applies to the full marathon (42 km).

Key: Course record (in bold)

Ed.	Date	Male Wwnner	Time	Female winner	Time	Rf.
1	2013.10.27	William Chebor (KEN)	2:14:30	Mulu Seboka (ETH)	2:42:57	
2	2014.10.26	Julius Seurei (KEN)	2:14:51	Winfrida Kwamboka (KEN)	2:40:25	
3	2015.10.25	Geoffrey Birgen (KEN)	2:17:43	Mestawot Tadesse (ETH)	2:43:30	
4	2016.10.23	Kennedy Lilan (KEN)	2:21:24	Jacqueline Kiplimo (KEN)	2:42:24	
5	2017.10.29	Anouar El Ghouz (MAR)	2:21:26	Peninah Kigen (KEN)	3:07:54	
6	2018.10.28	Bernard Muthoni (KEN)	2:19:25	Sheila Chesang (KEN)	2:46:49	
7	2019.10.27	Geoffrey Birgen (KEN)	**2:14:23**	Peninah Kigen (KEN)	2:40:46	
	2020; 2021; 2022	Cancelled due to coronavirus pandemic				
8	2023.10.22	David Barmasai (KEN)	2:14:54	Sheila Chesang (KEN)	2:59:05	
9	2024.06.23	Geoffrey Birgen (KEN)	2:16:26	Sheila Chesang (KEN)	**2:33:54**	
10	2025.06.29	Geoffrey Birgen (KEN)	2:16:00	Eunice Muchiri (KEN)	2:37:43	
11	2026.06.14	Kennedy Njogu (KEN)	2:16:23	Alemnesh Herpha (ETH)	2:36:54	
