= Colton Plaza =

Nikke Colton Plaza
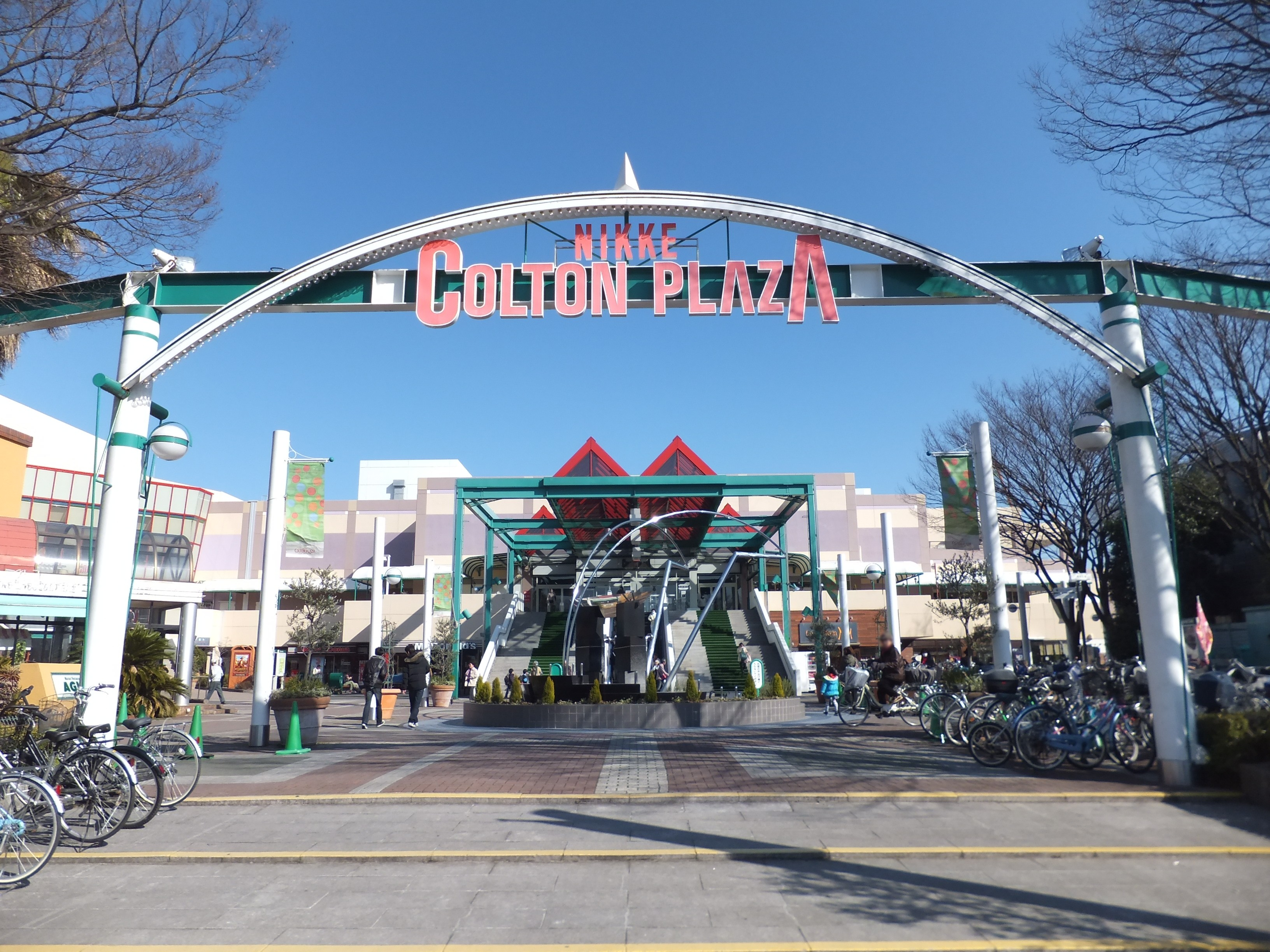
- West entrance (21 March 2012)
- Location: Ichikawa, Chiba Prefecture, Japan
- Coordinates: 35°42′56″N 139°56′1″E
- Opened: 25 November 1988
- Manager: The Japan Wool Textile Co., Ltd.
- Owner: The Japan Wool Textile Co., Ltd.
- Floor area: sqm
- Floors: 4
- Parking: 2,500
- Website: www.nikke-cp.gr.jp

Nikke Colton Plaza is a shopping mall in Moto-Yawata, Ichikawa city, Chiba prefecture, Japan. In addition to shops, the mall has a tennis court, movie theatres, a park, and a fountain.

The Ichikawa Citizen's Library and Chiba Museum of Science and Industry are near Nikke Colton Plaza.

== See also ==
- List of shopping malls in Japan
