= Bell Mall =

Shopping mall in Utsunomiya, Japan

Coordinates: 36°33′19″N 139°55′42″E

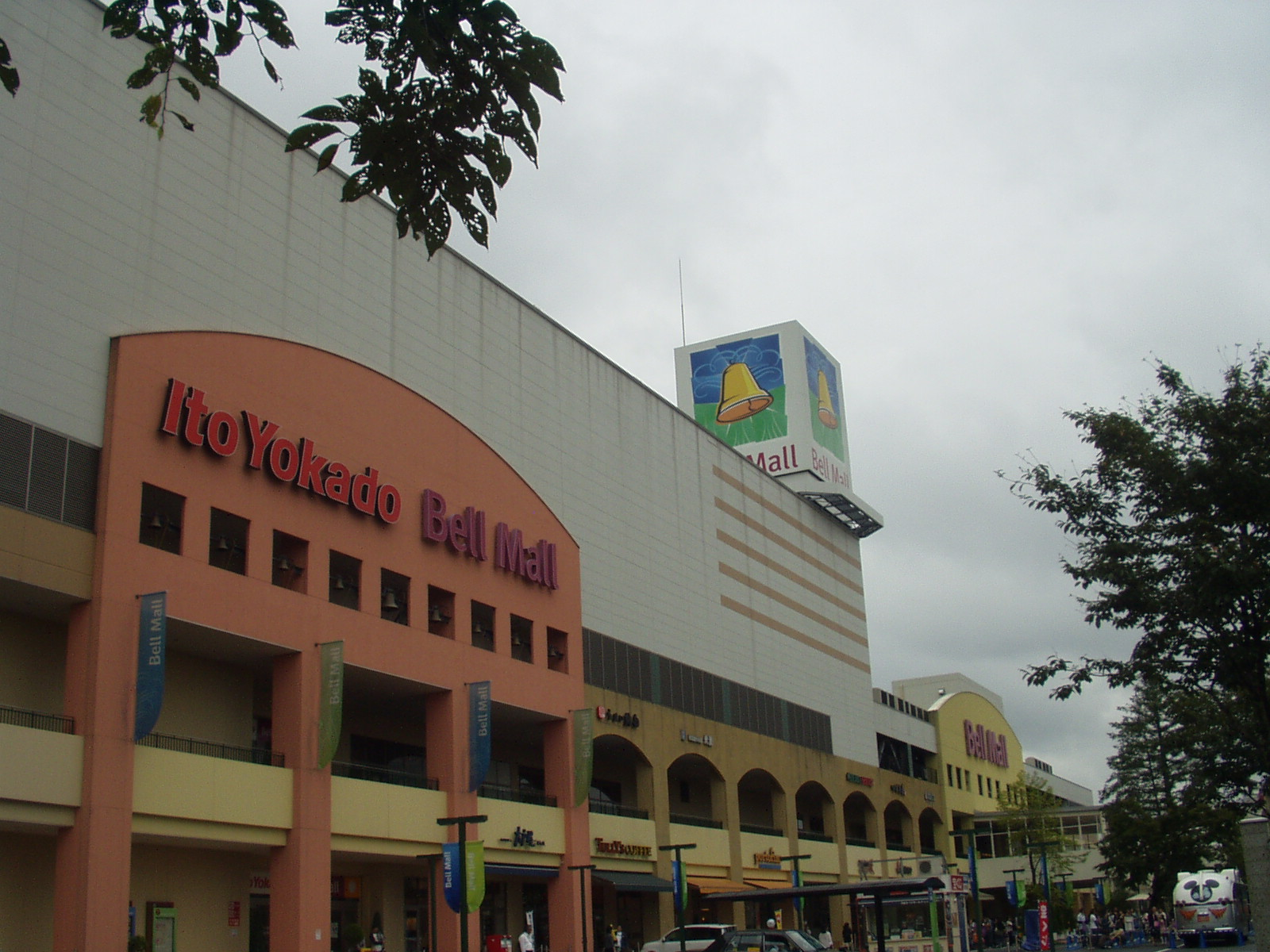
Bell Mall West Annex

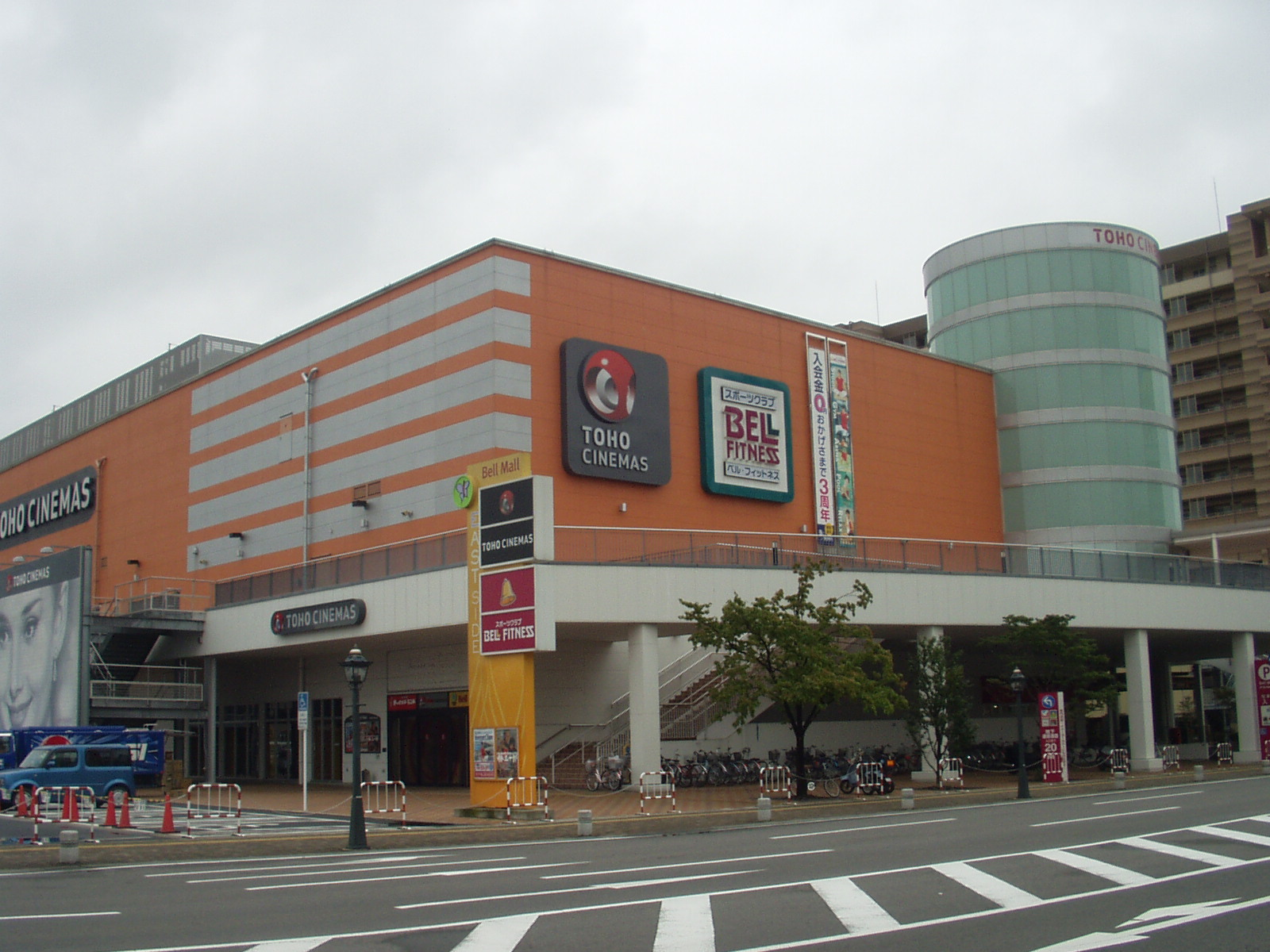
Bell Mall East Annex

Bell Mall (ベルモール) is a modern shopping mall in Utsunomiya, Tochigi Prefecture, Japan. It opened in 2004.

== Location ==
Bell Mall is located near the central area of Utsunomiya City, a large regional city in the Northern Kantō region, and it is one of the largest shopping centers in the North Kantō area.
Bell Mall is located at 6-2-1 Yoto, near the intersection of Kinu-dori(Yanagida-kaidou) Road and Sangyou Road, is also near Route 123 and New Route 4, and is about 3 km East of the Utsunomiya JR Train station.

== Description ==
Bell Mall is a large mall with approximately 81,000 sq. meters of shopping space along with approximately 76,500 sq. meters of parking space for approximately 5,000 cars. The mall is split into two sections, an East Annex and a West Annex. The East Annex is a large scale entertainment zone featuring amusement, health and healing, a Toho cinema complex, and the Bell fitness club. The West Annex includes the anchor tenant Ito-Yokado and many specialty retailers, restaurants and services. They include Golf5 by Alpen, Sports Depot, a food court, book store, CD store and other retailers. The mall also includes a Starbucks. The Bell Mall is famous for the Bell Mall theme song.

== Carillon ==
The name of the mall comes from a carillon, which is a musical instrument composed of at least 23 cup-shaped bells, that is located in the central part of the mall and is in the shape of a Christmas tree. The bells are sounded by an automated system as well as are several bells that are installed on the exterior of the mall. The bells are chimed at 10 o'clock (mall opening time), 12 o'clock, and 5 o'clock.

== See also ==
- List of shopping malls in Japan
