= Bahar Doğan =

Turkish long-distance runner

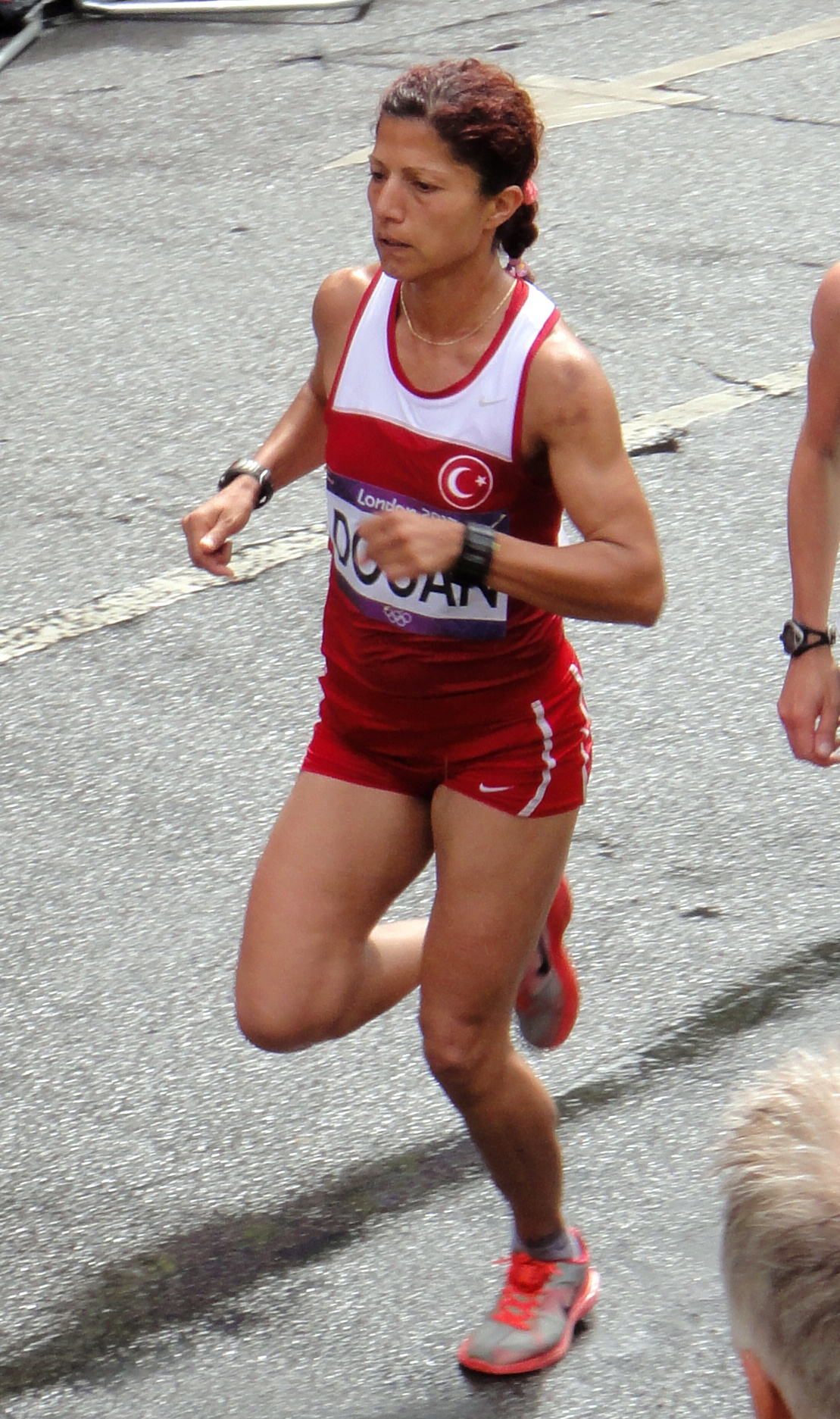

Personal information
- Nationality: Turkey
- Born: September 2, 1974 (age 52) İzmit, Turkey
- Height: 156 cm (5 ft 1 in)
- Weight: 48 kg (106 lb)

Sport
- Sport: Long-distance
- Club: Üsküdar Belediyespor
- Coached by: Ertan Hatipoğlu

Bahar Doğan (born September 2, 1974) is a Turkish female long-distance runner, who is specialized in marathon running. She is coached by Ertan Hatipoğlu at Üsküdar Belediyespor. The 156 cm (5 ft 1 in) tall athlete at 48 kg (106 lb) is a student of physical education and sports at Kocaeli University.

She is the winner of 2012 Adana Half Marathon with 1:16.18.

Bahar Doğan represented Turkey at the 2008 Summer Olympics in Beijing in the marathon event finishing 50th. In 2011, she won the first edition of Darıca Half Marathon in a time 1:14:10. She qualified for participation in the marathon event at the 2012 Olympics in London, and finished in 63rd place.

She took the 5th place in the 10,000 m. event of 2013 Mediterranean Games held in Mersin, Turkey (35:27:48)

In 2015 she was banned for 2 1/2 years for 2011 biological passport irregularities.

== Personal bests ==
According to All-Athletics records, her best times as of March 2012 are:

- 1500 m 4:28.90 - Ankara (TUR), 14.08.2010
- 3000 m 9:12.31 - Istanbul (TUR), 14.06.2009
- 5000 m 17:06.80 - Zenica (BIH), 03.09.2006
- 10,000 m 33:19.71 - Oslo (NOR), 04.06.2011
- 10 km road 36:30 - Istanbul (TUR), 14.05.2006
- Half marathon 1:10:20 - Trabzon (TUR), 22.02.2009
- Marathon 2:34:53 - Düsseldorf (GER), 08.05.2011
