= Darıca Half Marathon =

- Date: October
- Location: Kocaeli, Turkey
- Event type: Road
- Distance: Half Marathon
- Primary sponsor: Darica Municipality
- Established: September 25, 2011; 15 years ago
- Course records: men's: 1:02:23 (2013), women's: 1:11:50 (2013)

Darıca Half Marathon (Turkish: Uluslararası Darıca Yarı Maratonu) is an international athletic event that takes place in Darıca town of Kocaeli Province annually since 2011. The half marathon is organized in October. Master men and women divisions, as well as a 3 km (1.9 mi) fun run are held during the event.

The first half marathon took place on September 25, 2011 with 460 male and 90 female athletes. At the event held on October 6, 2013, 1,150 registered athletes from 15 nations took part. The fun run was performed by around 4,000 participants.

The total money prize is Us$50,000 while the male and female winners receive US$5,000, the runners-up US$3,000 and the third placed athletes US$2,000 etc. respectively.

== Winners ==
Key: Course record

Year	Men's winner	Time (h:m:s)	Women's winner	Time (h:m:s)
2018	Did not held			
2017	(Ethiopia) Derara Hurisa	1:03:36	(Kenya) Margaret Agai	1:12:35
2016	(Kenya) Samuel Kariuki	1:04:35	(Turkey) Esma Aydemir	1:15:00
2015	Did not held			
2014	(Azerbaijan) Evans Kiplagat	1:02:30	(Kenya) Purity Rionoripo	1:13:53
2013	(Kenya) Edwin Koech	1:02:23	(Kenya) Visiline Jepkesho	1:11:50
2012	(Kenya) Mark Kiptoo	1:03:31	(Ethiopia) Mulu Seboka	1:14:00
2011	(Turkey) Bekir Karayel	1:05:08	(Turkey) Bahar Doğan	1:14:10
