= Chiba Museum of Science and Industry =

Museum in Ichikawa, Chiba Prefecture, Japan

Coordinates: 35°42′54″N 139°55′58″E

- 千葉県立現代産業科学館
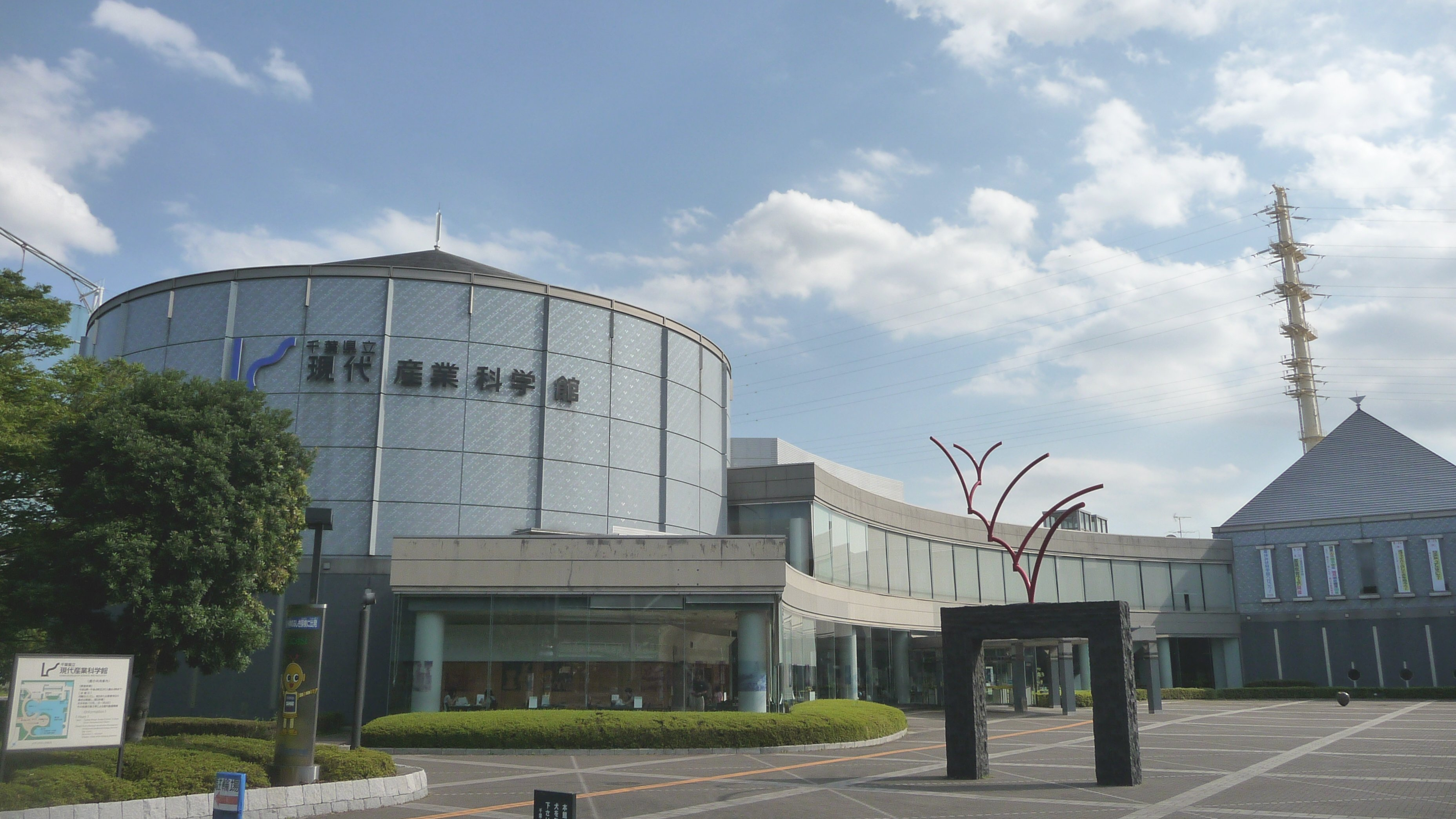
- Established: 1994
- Location: Ichikawa, Chiba Prefecture, Japan
- Type: Industry, and Technology
- Website: www.chiba-muse.or.jp

Chiba Museum of Science and Industry (千葉県立現代産業科学館, Chiba-kenritsu gendai sangyō kagaku-kan) is a science museum located in Ichikawa, Chiba Prefecture, Japan. The museum introduces mainly topics related to technology, for modern industry. The museum sets up its goal as to provide a place for experiencing various aspects of science and technology which is applied in industry to people at all ages.

== History ==
Originally the site of the museum was the location for nakayama factory of Japan Wool Textile. The site was reformed by constructing the museum and other facilities including Colton Plaza.

== Organization ==
The museum is operated by a board of 60 members presenting various organizations such as universities, companies, and foundations in Chiba prefecture.

== Facilities ==
- Experiment Theatre
- Science Stage
- Exhibition Hall
- Library

== Access ==
- 15 minutes walk from Shimōsa-Nakayama Station on Chūō-Sōbu Line
- 15 minutes walk from Motoyawata Station on Chūō-Sōbu Line
- 13 minutes walk from Onigoe Station on Keisei Electric Railway
- 20 minutes walk from Motoyawata Station on Toei Shinjuku Line
