= List of shopping malls in Japan =

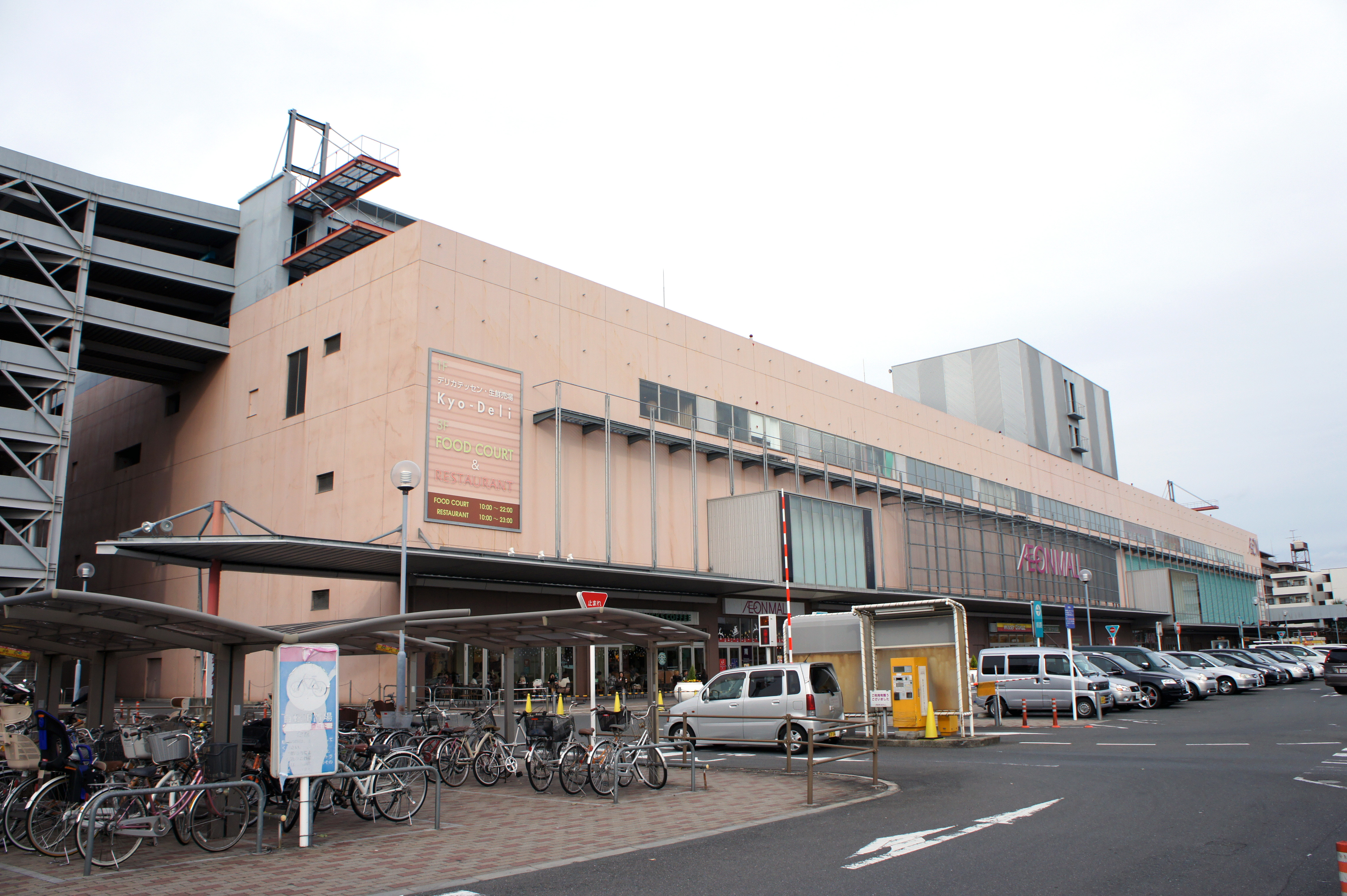
Æon Mall Kyoto Gojō

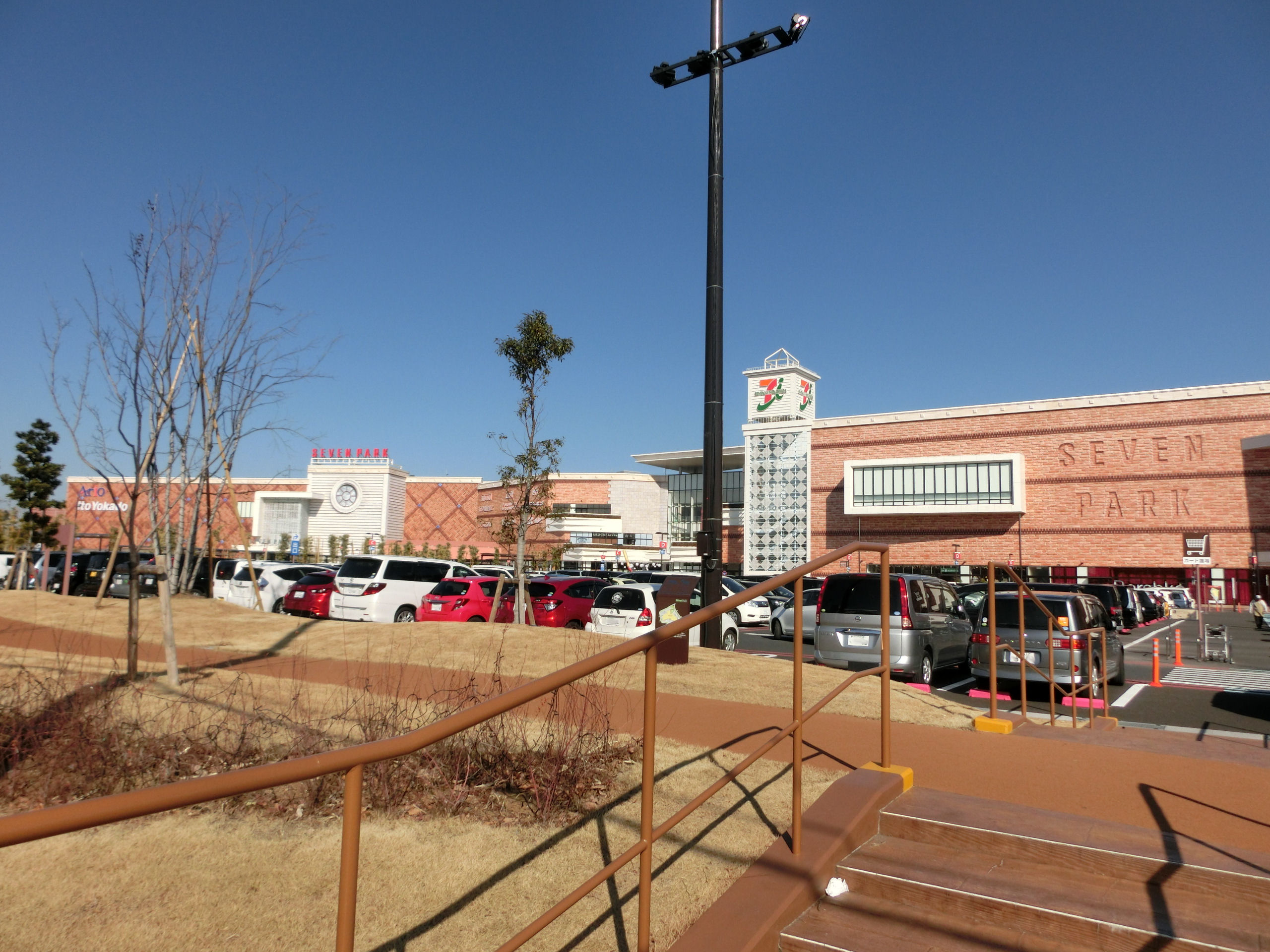
Ario Shopping Mall Kashiwa in Chiba Prefecture

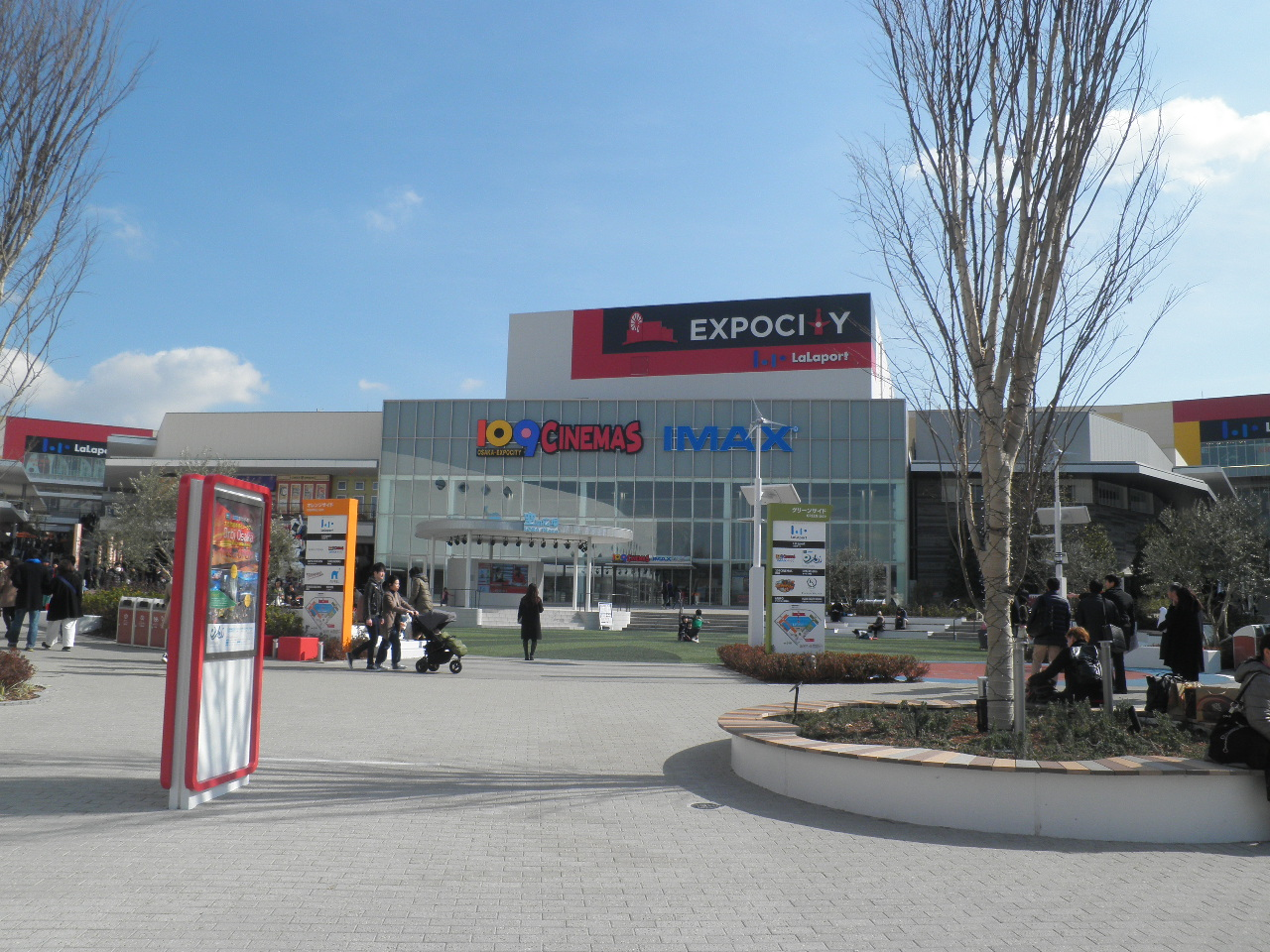
Lalaport Expocity in Osaka Prefecture

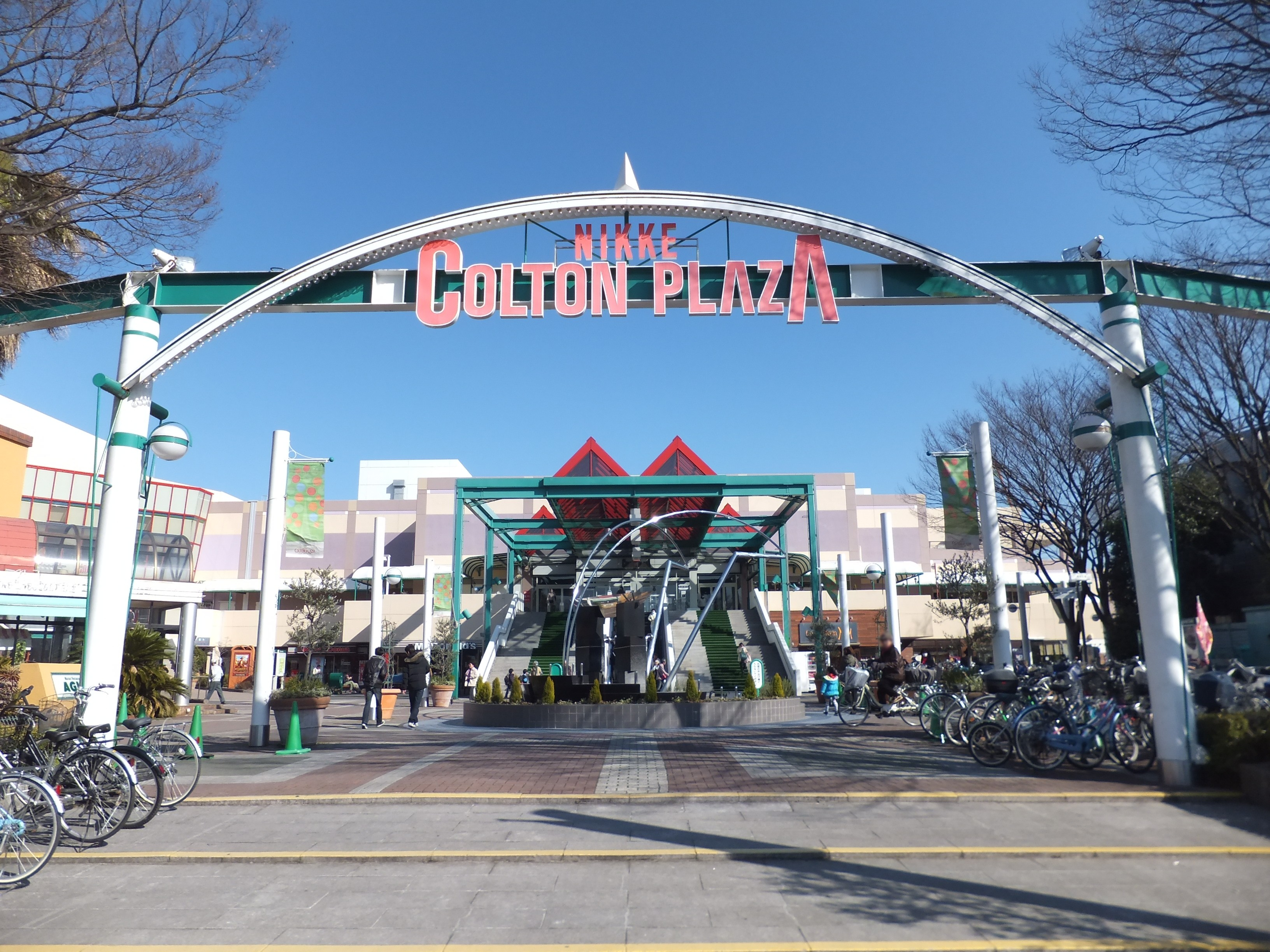
The west entrance to Nikke Colton Plaza

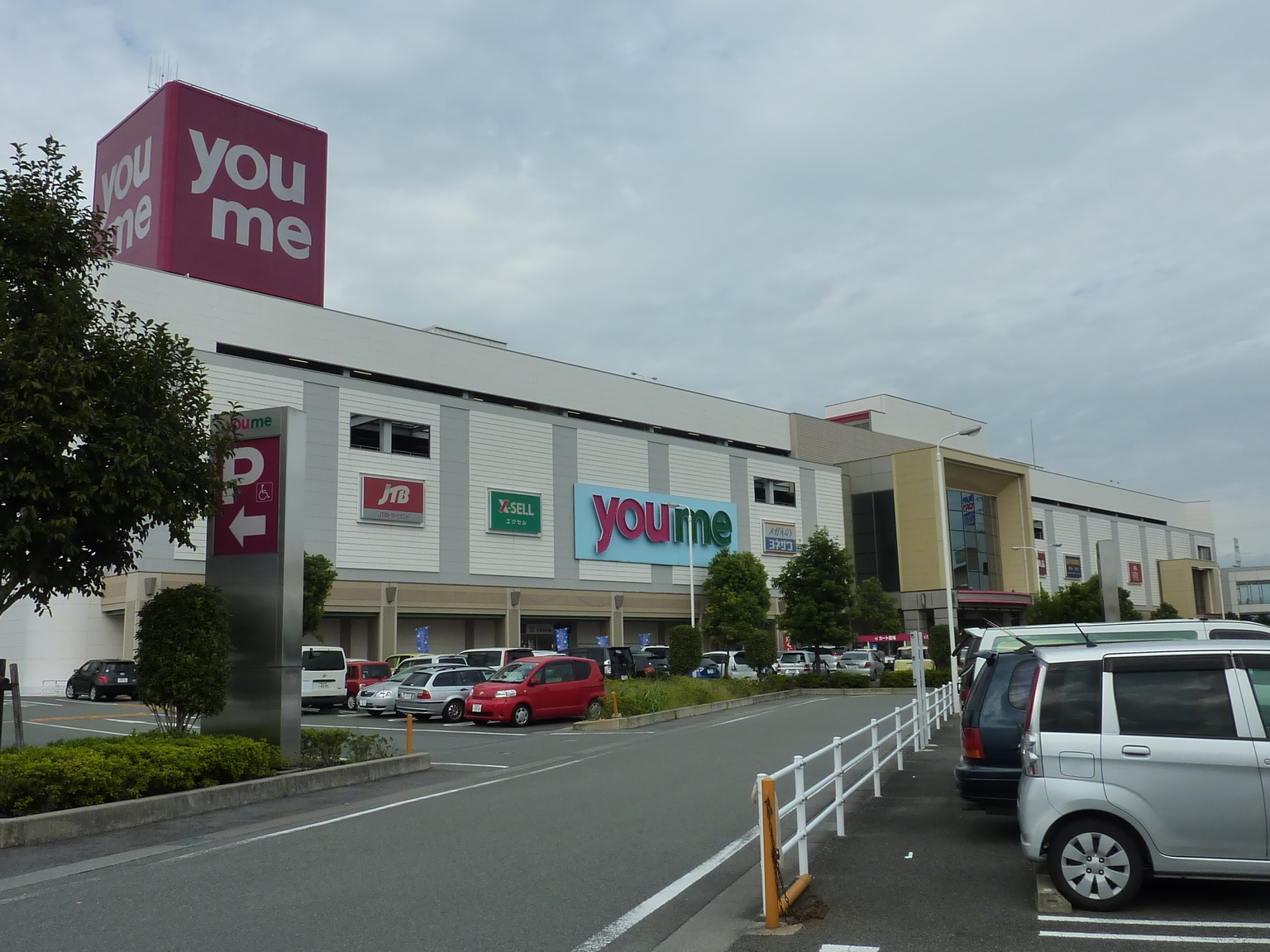
Youme Town Mall in Kumamoto Prefecture

This is a list of shopping malls and shopping centers in Japan.

== Shopping malls in Japan ==
- Lalaport, Tokyo Bay in Minami-Funabashi
- Abeno Cues Town
- Æon Mall, 144 places in nationwide.
- Ario, 18 places in Sapporo, Sendai, Greater Tokyo area, Nagano Prefecture, Osaka Prefecture and Kurashiki.
- Bell Mall, Utsunomiya
- Canal City Hakata
- DiverCity Tokyo Plaza, Odaiba
- Grandberry Park, Minami-Machida
- HEP Five
- Landmark Plaza, Minato Mirai 21
- Lalaport, Lalagarden, Lala Terrace, 19 places in Greater Tokyo area, Kansai region, Sendai and Iwata.
- Lazona Kawasaki Plaza
- Nikke Colton Plaza
- Palette Town, Tokyo
- Queen's Square, Yokohama
- Seiyu Group
- Shonan Mall Fill
- Yaesu Chikagai
- Yanagase
- Yebisu Garden Place
- Youme Town, 64 places in Kyushu, Shikoku and Chūgoku region, western Japan.

== See also ==
- Lists of shopping malls
