= Visiline Jepkesho =

Kenyan long-distance runner

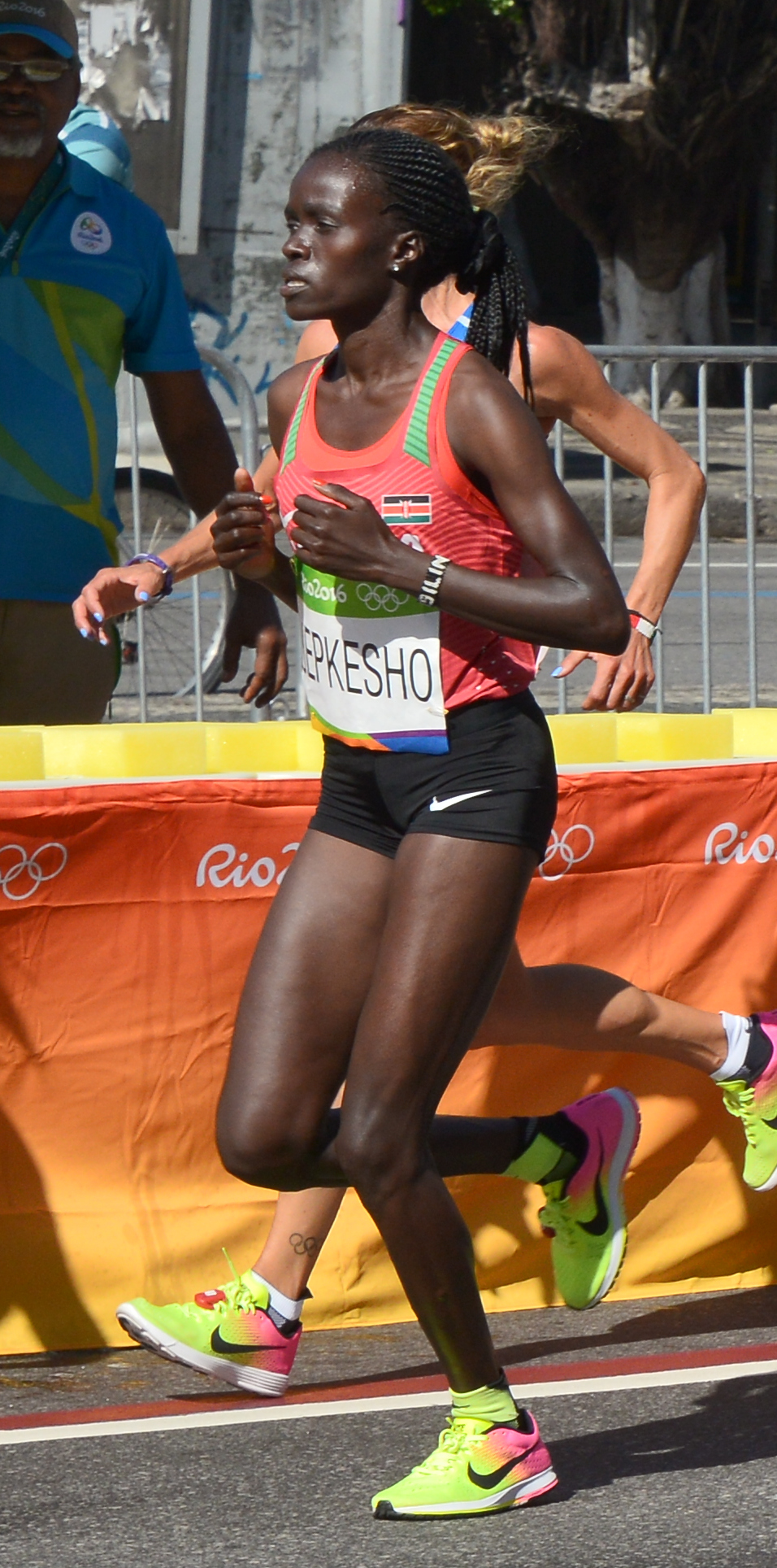
- Jepkesho at the 2016 Olympics

Personal information
- Born: 30 December 1989 (age 36)
- Height: 160 cm (5 ft 3 in)
- Weight: 43 kg (95 lb)

Sport
- Country: Kenya
- Sport: Athletics
- Event: Long-distance running

Achievements and titles
- Personal best(s): 10,000 m – 33:01.30 (2015); Marathon – 2:22:58 (2018)
- Updated on 9 November 2021

Visiline Jepkesho (born 30 December 1989) is a Kenyan long-distance runner. She competed in the marathon at the 2015 World Championships in Athletics and 2016 Summer Olympics.

She began her professional road running career in 2013 and won the Darıca Half Marathon. A marathon debut followed at the 2014 Milan Marathon, which she won in a time of 2:28:40. She had two more high-profile wins that year, topping the podium at the Gifu Seiryu Half Marathon and the Lisbon Marathon, setting personal bests of 1:10:53 and 2:26:47 along the way.

She entered the top level 2015 Paris Marathon and made the top three with a run of 2:24:44. This earned her her first international selection. At the start of 2016 she dropped out of her first marathon (failing to finish the distance at the Nagoya Women's Marathon), but then rebounded with a win at the Paris Marathon.

In 2018 she broke the Ljubljana Marathon record with a time of 2:22:58.

== See also ==
- Kenya at the 2015 World Championships in Athletics
