= Kansai Super =

Supermarket chain in Kansai, Japan

Kansai Super Market Ltd.
- Native name: 株式会社関西スーパーマーケット
- Type: kabushiki gaisha
- Traded as: TYO: 9919 (March 19, 2008 -); OSE: 9919
- Industry: Retail
- Founded: Itami, Hyōgo Prefecture, Japan (July 29, 1959)
- Headquarters: 3-38, Chuo Gochome, Itami, Hyōgo Prefecture, Japan
- Number of locations: 60 (2012)
- Area served: Hyōgo Prefecture (Kobe and the Hanshin area); Osaka Prefecture; Nara in Nara Prefecture
- Key people: Tamotsu Inoue (President)
- Brands: Kansai Super
- Revenue: ▲¥118,927 million (2012) (Note: 平成24年3月期 決算短信（連結） [Results of FY ended in March 2012 (consolidated)] (PDF) (in Japanese). Kansai Super Market Ltd. April 26, 2012.); ¥116,740 million (2011)
- Operating income: ▲¥2,073 million (2012); ¥1,785 million (2011)
- Net income: ▲¥1,111 million (2012); ¥893 million (2011)
- Total assets: ▲¥55,941 million (2012); ¥52,217 million (2011)
- Total equity: ▲¥26,003 million (2012); ¥25,338 million (2011)
- Owner: H_{2}O Retailing (10.2%); Stakeholders of Kansai Supermarket's business acquaintance (8.95%); OK (7.23%); Kanesei Supermarket's stocks (6.00%); Itochu (4.47%); Goldman Sachs (3.78%); Mitsubishi Bank (3.56%); Mizuho Bank (3.56%); UG (3.52%); Kokubu group (3.19%); Kanesei (2.50%); Ken Iwata (2.21%)
- Website: www.kansaisuper.co.jp

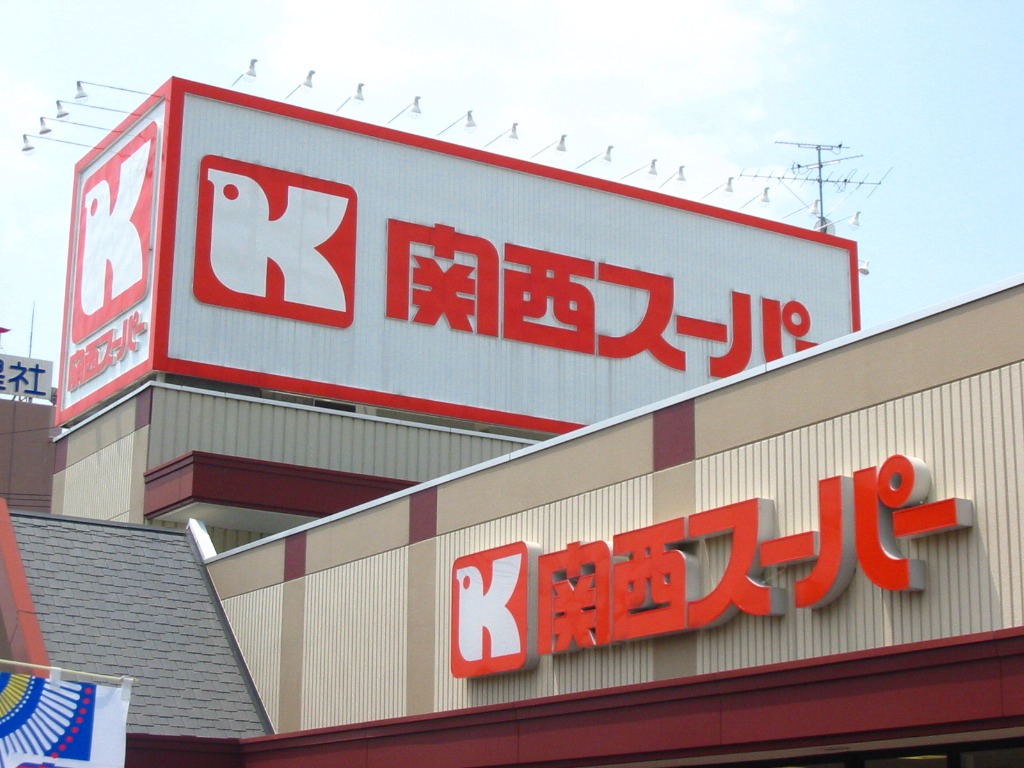
A Kansai Super store located in Kōbe, Japan.

Kansai Super Market Ltd. (株式会社関西スーパーマーケット, Kabushiki-gaisha Kansai Sūpā Māketto) is a supermarket chain named for the Kansai region of Japan where its stores are located. Its logo is a bird in the shape of a K. According to the Kansai Super website (http://www.kansaisuper.co.jp/index.php?mode=tenpo), as of 2011 it has 60 stores: 11 in Kōbe city, 17 in the greater Hanshin area of Hyōgo Prefecture, 9 in the northern part of Ōsaka Prefecture, 14 in Ōsaka city, 5 in eastern Ōsaka, 3 in southern Ōsaka, and one in Nara, Nara Prefecture.
