= Tulsa Run =

Annual 15k run

- Date: October
- Location: Tulsa, Oklahoma
- Event type: Road
- Distance: 15K, 5K, 2K
- Established: 1978 (48 years ago)

The Tulsa Run is a 15 kilometer running event in Tulsa, Oklahoma featuring thousands of runners in the annual October event.
