= City to Surf (Perth) =

Road running event in Perth, Australia

Chevron City to Surf for Activ
- Location: Perth, Western Australia
- Distance: 4 or 12 kilometres
- Established: 23 February 1975

The City to Surf is a popular road running event held annually in Perth, Western Australia, in which participants race from the CBD to City Beach, a distance of approximately 12 kilometres (7.5 mi). A shorter 4-kilometre (2.5 mi) course is also held in conjunction. The event is both a "fun run" and a race, attracting both serious runners and community participants who can choose to run or to walk.

The annual event has historically drawn more than 40,000 competitors on the last Sunday in August.

== History ==
The first City to Surf was held on 23 February 1975 with 500 participants. Since its inception, the 12-kilometre (7.5 mi) course has consistently started on St Georges Terrace at the Perth City Council Chambers and finished at Jubilee Park in City Beach. The first male winner of the 12km event was Tim Walsh in 38 minutes and 6 seconds. The first woman to cross the finish line was Peta Carr in 58.18.

In 2009, the City to Surf held its inaugural marathon.

The City to Surf had a three-year hiatus between 2020 and 2022 due to the COVID-19 pandemic.

== 12km winners ==
The previously certified 12km course was adjusted in 2017, removing 303 metres (994 ft) from the total distance, so records set in those years are marked with an asterisk.

Year	Male	Time	Female	Time
1975	Tim Walsh	38:06	Peta Carr	58:18
1976	Jim Langford	38:36	Maureen Tracey	49:54
1977	Tim Walsh	38:04	Gaylene Clews	47:24
1978	Duncan Sullivan	38:01	Gaylene Clews	46:55
1979	John Hambleton	37:33	Anne Reddish	46:58
1980	Clive Hicks	38:34	Margaret Reddish	46:08
1981	Jim Langford	37:34	Margaret Reddish	43:53
1982	David Eltringham	37:38	Jacqi Robinson	45:35
1983	Alan Thurlow	36:52	Jacqi Robinson	45:35
1984	Ray Boyd	37:02	Tessa Brockwell	44:16
1985	Stephen Spiers	37:02	Margaret Pettitt	45:47
1986	Ray Boyd	37:04	Sue Turner	44:16
1987	Ray Boyd	35:52	Robyn Hoskins	45:10
1988	Clive Hicks	37:46	Glenda Thomas	43:14
1989	Ray Boyd	37:37	Karen Gobby	46:16
1990	Ray Boyd	37:20	Suzanne Malaxos	42:26
1991	Rod Barnes	38:40	Glenda Moore	43:58
1992	Andrew Lloyd	36:36	Karen Gobby	41:54
1993	Trevor Scott	37:58	Glenda Moore	42:42
1994	Ray Boyd	36:22	Glenda Moore	44:12
1995	Ray Boyd	36:56	Suzanne Malaxos	41:32
1996	Ray Boyd	36:02	Mary Burke-Heydon	45:46
1997	Michael Dalton	37:00	Suzanne Malaxos	42:24
1998	Ray Boyd	37:43	Claire Stynes	44:35
1999	Kim Gillard	36:19	Liz Miller	41:24
2000	Ray Boyd	37:52	Jackie Newton	44:40
2001	Ray Boyd	37:34	Sue Hobson	44:00
2002	Alastair Stevenson	37:48	Hayley McGregor	43:03
2003	Mark Thompson	35:42	Lauren Shelley	43:52
2004	Alastair Stevenson	36:45	Verity Tolhurst	43:53
2005	Patrick Nyangelo	36:10	Lauren Shelley	42:33
2006	Brett Cartwright	35:25	Lauren Shelley	42:27
2007	Brett Cartwright	37:07	Lauren Shelley	43:30
2008	Martin Dent	35:31	Linda Spencer	42:58
2009	David Mulvee	37:42	Hollie Emery	41:53
2010	Alan Craigie	37:05	Lisa Weightman	40:22
2011	Reuben Kosgei	35:29	Lauren Shelley	44:20
2012	Harry Summers	36:10	Linda Spencer	42:42
2013	Harry Summers	36:54	Linda Spencer	41:56
2014	Brenton Rowe	36:47	Kate Fitzsimons	42:09
2015	Roberto Busi	37:52	Linda Spencer	43:05
2016	Roberto Busi	38:08	Kate Fitzsimons	45:59
2017*	Matthew Ramsden	36:02	Eloise Wellings	40:13
2018*	Matthew Ramsden	35.23	Emily Witham	42:17

== See also ==
- City2Surf (Sydney)
