= Yanagase =

Coordinates: 35°25′09″N 136°45′26″E

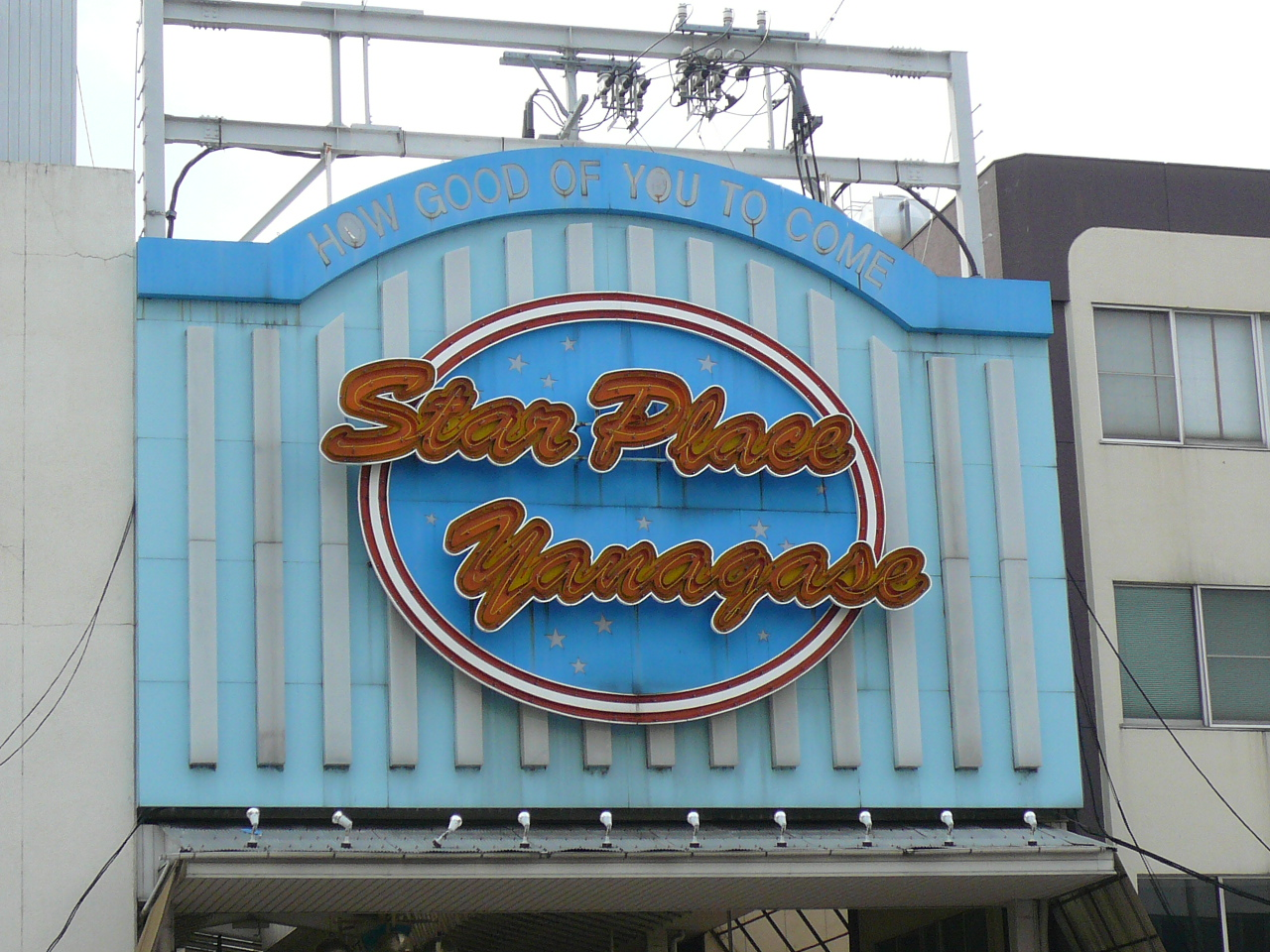
Entrance to West Yanagase

Yanagase (柳ヶ瀬) is a downtown covered shopping arcade that serves as the main shopping area in the city of Gifu in Gifu Prefecture, Japan.

== History ==
Yanagase first gained nationwide fame when Kenichi Mikawa released Yanagase Blues in 1966. As a result of the song, many visitors from throughout Japan came to Gifu to shop there. Gifu's position as a center of the fashion industry also contributed to Yanagase's popularity.

== Location ==
Yanagase is located approximately 700m north of JR Gifu Station on the city's main street (Nagarabashi-dōri), which also forms its eastern border. It covers an area approximately 500m wide and is bordered on the west by Chūsetsubashi-dōri. Kinkabashi-dōri runs through the center of Yanagase, effectively dividing it into eastern and western portions.

== Major Facilities ==
Gifu Takashimaya: This is Yanagase's primary department store. Sales reached a peak of 24.9 billion yen (approximately $184 million) in 1991 but had dropped to 15.6 billion yen (approximately $116 million) by February 2005. At that point, Takashimaya began renovating the store to boost sales. The renewal has since increased sales at Takashimaya. In December 2006, Takashimaya opened a branch of MUJI in a neighboring building.

MELSA: Part of the Meitetsu chain, MELSA primarily features women's fashion and gourmet foods. MELSA Hall, a concert hall, is located on the eighth floor. Daiso, a popular 100-yen shop, is located on the fifth floor.

== See also ==
- List of shopping malls in Japan
