= World Athletics Label Road Races =

Collection of road running races deemed "leading around the world" by World Athletics

- Logos of World Athletics Road Races Label in 2023
- Sport: Road running
- Founded: 2008
- Continent: Global
- Website: https://www.worldathletics.org/competitions/world-athletics-label-road-races

World Athletics Label Road Races are races that World Athletics (until 2019: IAAF) designates as the "leading road races around the world." The classification was first introduced for the 2008 running season, upon the suggestion of the IAAF Road Running Commission. The races are split into three categories: marathons, half marathons and other. Within the "other" category are traditional road race distances, over which World Athletics world records can be set, along with some "Classical races", which span unusual distances. The Labels are considered a prestigious award by race organisers, and include the seven World Marathon Majors. Platinum Label races have the strictest requirements, followed by Gold, then Elite, and general Label Races. All categories require what the World Athletics describes as an international elite field, that requires at least five nations for the highest labels to be represented by runners with times faster than the World Athletics's guidelines. Additionally, the race course must be closed to vehicular traffic, and measured to the Association of International Marathons and Distance Races (AIMS) standard, with full electronic timing used to generate the results.

In the first year, only Gold and Silver Labels were awarded, and 49 races were recognised. A third tier was introduced in 2010, entitled the Bronze Label, and in 2015, 88 races were listed in total. Starting in the 2023 season, only four tiers are used: Platinum Label, Gold Label, Elite Label and Label.

The old IAAF Road Race Label logos

In October 2018, the IAAF announced to introduced the Platinum Label for the 2020 season. For the 2021, the Platinum Label was renamed Elite Platinum Label, the Gold Label was renamed Elite Label, and the Silver and Bronze Labels were merged into Label Races. Then, in 2023, the Elite Platinum Label reverts to the Platinum Label and the Gold Label re-emerges, becoming an intermediate tier between the Elite and Platinum Labels.

The Labels are assessed and awarded each year. Race organisers have to apply to the World Athletics for recognition, and show that their race can meet a number of criteria. The criteria vary for the different levels; The race must be organised in a way that minimizes ecological damage to the surrounding areas. A specified number of doping tests must be carried out, and prize money for the participants should be equal, irrespective of gender or nationality, though additional rewards can be given to runners from the host nation.

In 2017, Japan had the most road race Label events, with 9, although the Czech Republic hosted the most Gold Label events, 7. 3 races on the African continent received Label status in 2015.

== Editions ==
World Athletics Label Road Racing editions
Ed.	Year	Start date	End date	Races	Elite Platinum	Platinum	Gold	Elite	Label	Silver	Bronze	Marathons	Half marathons	10K	Other dist.	Ref.
1	2008	5 January	7 December	49	—N/a	—N/a	12	—N/a	—N/a	37	—N/a	32	8	6	3	
2	2009	3 January	31 December	49	—N/a	—N/a	19	—N/a	—N/a	30	—N/a	34	8	5	2	
3	2010	2 January	31 December	57	—N/a	—N/a	24	—N/a	—N/a	24	9	35	10	9	3	
4	2011	2 January	31 December	65	—N/a	—N/a	26	—N/a	—N/a	25	14	39	13	9	4	
5	2012	7 January	31 December	71	—N/a	—N/a	35	—N/a	—N/a	21	15	44	14	10	4	
6	2013	5 January	31 December	74	—N/a	—N/a	36	—N/a	—N/a	21	17	46	12	11	5	
7	2014	2 January	31 December	80	—N/a	—N/a	38	—N/a	—N/a	24	18	50	16	10	4	
8	2015	3 January	31 December	88	—N/a	—N/a	43	—N/a	—N/a	27	18	55	18	10	5	
9	2016	2 January	31 December	88	—N/a	—N/a	44	—N/a	—N/a	17	27	59	19	8	2	
10	2017	2 January	31 December	103	—N/a	—N/a	50	—N/a	—N/a	20	33	68	23	9	3	
11	2018	7 January	31 December	114	—N/a	—N/a	56	—N/a	—N/a	26	32	75	26	9	4	
12	2019	6 January	31 December	138	—N/a	—N/a	64	—N/a	—N/a	25	49	88	28	15	7	
13	2020	5 January	31 December	48	—N/a	5	23	—N/a	—N/a	7	13	31	11	5	1	
14	2021	31 January	31 December	88	9	—N/a	—N/a	28	51	—N/a	—N/a	54	21	9	4	
15	2022	9 January	31 December	162	12	—N/a	—N/a	67	83	—N/a	—N/a	82	41	21	11	
16	2023	15 January	31 December	248	—N/a	15	39	64	130	—N/a	—N/a	150	63	23	12	
17	2024	7 January	31 December	303	—N/a	16	45	65	177	—N/a	—N/a	160	88	36	19	

== See also ==
- List of half marathon races
- List of marathon races
- List of World Athletics Label marathon races
