= 2015 IAAF Road Race Label Events =

Road running competition series

The 2015 IAAF Road Race Label Events were the eighth edition of the global series of road running competitions given Label status by the International Association of Athletics Federations (IAAF). All six World Marathon Majors had Gold Label status. The series included a total of 88 road races: 43 Gold, 27 Silver and 18 Bronze. In terms of distance, 55 races were marathons, 18 were half marathons, 10 were 10K runs, and 5 were held over other distances.

The Boulogne-Billancourt Half Marathon was cancelled two days before its race date due to the November 2015 Paris attacks.

== Races ==
- World Marathon Majors

Date	Label	Distance	Competition	Venue	Country	Men's winner	Women's winner
3 January 2015	Gold	Marathon	Xiamen International Marathon	Xiamen	China	[[]] (25x17px)	[[]] (25x17px)
18 January 2015	Bronze	Marathon	Chevron Houston Marathon	Houston	United States	[[]] (25x17px)	[[]] (25x17px)
23 January 2015	Gold	Marathon	Standard Chartered Dubai Marathon	Dubai	United Arab Emirates	[[]] (25x17px)	[[]] (25x17px)
25 January 2015	Silver	Marathon	Osaka Women's Marathon	Osaka	Japan	[[]] (25x17px)	[[]] (25x17px)
25 January 2015	Silver	Marathon	Standard Chartered Hong Kong Marathon	Hong Kong	China	[[]] (25x17px)	[[]] (25x17px)
1 February 2015	Silver	Marathon	Beppu-Oita Mainichi Marathon	Ōita	Japan	[[]] (25x17px)	[[]] (25x17px)
1 February 2015	Silver	Half marathon	Kagawa Marugame International Half Marathon	Marugame	Japan	[[]] (25x17px)	[[]] (25x17px)
22 February 2015	Bronze	Marathon	Zurich Maraton de Sevilla	Seville	Spain	[[]] (25x17px)	[[]] (25x17px)
22 February 2015	Gold	Marathon	Tokyo Marathon	Tokyo	Japan	[[]] (25x17px)	[[]] (25x17px)
1 March 2015	Gold	Half marathon	RomaOstia Half Marathon	Rome	Italy	[[]] (25x17px)	[[]] (25x17px)
1 March 2015	Gold	10K run	World's Best 10K	San Juan	Puerto Rico	[[]] (25x17px)	[[]] (25x17px)
1 March 2015	Gold	Marathon	Lake Biwa Mainichi Marathon	Ōtsu	Japan	[[]] (25x17px)	[[]] (25x17px)
8 March 2015	Gold	Marathon	Nagoya Women's Marathon	Nagoya	Japan	[[]] (25x17px)	[[]] (25x17px)
15 March 2015	Gold	Marathon	Seoul International Marathon	Seoul	South Korea	[[]] (25x17px)	[[]] (25x17px)
22 March 2015	Bronze	Marathon	New Taipei Wan Jin Shi Marathon	New Taipei City	Taiwan	[[]] (25x17px)	[[]] (25x17px)
22 March 2015	Gold	Half marathon	EDP Half Marathon of Lisbon	Lisbon	Portugal	[[]] (25x17px)	[[]] (25x17px)
22 March 2015	Gold	Marathon	Maratona di Rome	Rome	Italy	[[]] (25x17px)	[[]] (25x17px)
28 March 2015	Gold	Half marathon	Sportisimo Prague Half Marathon	Prague	Czech Republic	[[]] (25x17px)	[[]] (25x17px)
5 April 2015	Silver	Marathon	Daegu International Marathon	Daegu	South Korea	[[]] (25x17px)	[[]] (25x17px)
11 April 2015	Silver	10K run	Great Ireland Run	Dublin	Ireland	[[]] (25x17px)	[[]] (25x17px)
12 April 2015	Bronze	Marathon	SuisseGas Milan Marathon	Milan	Italy	[[]] (25x17px)	[[]] (25x17px)
12 April 2015	Bronze	Marathon	Brighton Marathon	Brighton	United Kingdom	[[]] (25x17px)	[[]] (25x17px)
12 April 2015	Gold	Marathon	Marathon Rotterdam	Rotterdam	Netherlands	[[]] (25x17px)	[[]] (25x17px)
12 April 2015	Gold	Marathon	Vienna City Marathon	Vienna	Austria	[[]] (25x17px)	[[]] (25x17px)
12 April 2015	Gold	Marathon	Schneider Electric Marathon de Paris	Paris	France	[[]] (25x17px)	[[]] (25x17px)
12 April 2015	Bronze	Marathon	Maraton de Santiago	Santiago	Chile	[[]] (25x17px)	[[]] (25x17px)
19 April 2015	Silver	Marathon	Lodz Maraton Dbam o Zdrowie	Łódź	Poland	[[]] (25x17px)	[[]] (25x17px)
19 April 2015	Gold	Half marathon	Yangzhou Jianzhen International Half Marathon	Yangzhou	China	[[]] (25x17px)	[[]] (25x17px)
19 April 2015	Silver	Marathon	HAJ Hannover Marathon	Hannover	Germany	[[]] (25x17px)	[[]] (25x17px)
19 April 2015	Bronze	Marathon	Nagano Marathon	Nagano	Japan	[[]] (25x17px)	[[]] (25x17px)
20 April 2015	Gold	Marathon	B.A.A. Boston Marathon	Boston	United States	[[]] (25x17px)	[[]] (25x17px)
26 April 2015	Gold	Marathon	Virgin Money London Marathon	London	United Kingdom	[[]] (25x17px)	[[]] (25x17px)
26 April 2015	Silver	Marathon	Yellow River Estuary International Marathon	Dongying	China	[[]] (25x17px)	[[]] (25x17px)
26 April 2015	Silver	Marathon	Orlen Warsaw Marathon	Warsaw	Poland	[[]] (25x17px)	[[]] (25x17px)
26 April 2015	Silver	Marathon	Rock'n'Roll Madrid Marathon & Half	Madrid	Spain	[[]] (25x17px)	[[]] (25x17px)
3 May 2015	Gold	Marathon	Volkswagen Prague Marathon	Prague	Czech Republic	[[]] (25x17px)	[[]] (25x17px)
10 May 2015	Gold	10K run	The Great Manchester Run	Manchester	United Kingdom	[[]] (25x17px)	[[]] (25x17px)
16 May 2015	Bronze	10K run	Okpekpe 10km Road Race	Okpekpe	Nigeria	[[]] (25x17px)	[[]] (25x17px)
17 May 2015	Bronze	Marathon	Lattelecom Riga Marathon	Riga	Latvia	[[]] (25x17px)	[[]] (25x17px)
17 May 2015	Silver	Half marathon	Gifu Seiryu Half Marathon	Gifu	Japan	[[]] (25x17px)	[[]] (25x17px)
23 May 2015	Silver	Half marathon	Mattoni Karlovy Vary Half Marathon	Karlovy Vary	Czech Republic	[[]] (25x17px)	[[]] (25x17px)
23 May 2015	Gold	10K run	Ottawa 10K	Ottawa	Canada	[[]] (25x17px)	[[]] (25x17px)
24 May 2015	Silver	Marathon	Ottawa Marathon	Ottawa	Canada	[[]] (25x17px)	[[]] (25x17px)
30 May 2015	Silver	5K run	Freihofer's Run for Women	New York City	United States	[[]] (25x17px)	[[]] (25x17px)
31 May 2015	Bronze	Marathon	The Edinburgh Marathon	Edinburgh	United Kingdom	[[]] (25x17px)	[[]] (25x17px)
6 June 2015	Silver	Half marathon	Mattoni Ceske Budejovice Half Marathon	České Budějovice	Czech Republic	[[]] (25x17px)	[[]] (25x17px)
13 June 2015	Bronze	10K run	Corrida de Langueux	Langueux	France	[[]] (25x17px)	[[]] (25x17px)
20 June 2015	Gold	Half marathon	Mattoni Olomouc Half Marathon	Olomouc	Czech Republic	[[]] (25x17px)	[[]] (25x17px)
5 July 2015	Gold	Marathon	Gold Coast Airport Marathon	Queensland	Australia	[[]] (25x17px)	[[]] (25x17px)
26 July 2015	Gold	Half marathon	Bogota International Half Marathon	Bogotá	Colombia	[[]] (25x17px)	[[]] (25x17px)
5 September 2015	Gold	10K run	Birell Prague Grand Prix	Prague	Czech Republic	[[]] (25x17px)	[[]] (25x17px)
12 September 2015	Gold	Half marathon	Mattoni Usti nad Labem Half Marathon	Ústí nad Labem	Czech Republic	[[]] (25x17px)	[[]] (25x17px)
13 September 2015	Gold	Half marathon	Great North Run	Newcastle upon Tyne	United Kingdom	[[]] (25x17px)	[[]] (25x17px)
13 September 2015	Bronze	Half marathon	Copenhagen Half Marathon	Copenhagen	Denmark	[[]] (25x17px)	[[]] (25x17px)
20 September 2015	Silver	Marathon	Cape Town Marathon	Cape Town	South Africa	[[]] (25x17px)	[[]] (25x17px)
20 September 2015	Gold	Marathon	Blackmores Sydney Marathon	Sydney	Australia	[[]] (25x17px)	[[]] (25x17px)
20 September 2015	Gold	10K run	Carrera de la Mujer	Bogotá	Colombia	[[]] (25x17px)	[[]] (25x17px)
20 September 2015	Bronze	Marathon	Siberian International Marathon	Omsk	Russia	[[]] (25x17px)	[[]] (25x17px)
20 September 2015	Silver	10 miles	Dam Tot Damloop	Amsterdam	Netherlands	[[]] (25x17px)	[[]] (25x17px)
20 September 2015	Gold	Marathon	Beijing Marathon	Beijing	China	[[]] (25x17px)	[[]] (25x17px)
27 September 2015	Gold	Marathon	BMW Berlin Marathon	Berlin	Germany	[[]] (25x17px)	[[]] (25x17px)
4 October 2015	Bronze	Marathon	Bournemouth Marathon	Bournemouth	United Kingdom	[[]] (25x17px)	[[]] (25x17px)
4 October 2015	Gold	Half marathon	Bank of Scotland Great Scottish Run	Glasgow	United Kingdom	[[]] (25x17px)	[[]] (25x17px)
11 October 2015	Bronze	20K run	20 Kilometres de Paris	Paris	France	[[]] (25x17px)	[[]] (25x17px)
11 October 2015	Gold	Marathon	Bank of America Chicago Marathon	Chicago	United States	[[]] (25x17px)	[[]] (25x17px)
18 October 2015	Silver	Half marathon	Great Birmingham Run	Birmingham	United Kingdom	[[]] (25x17px)	[[]] (25x17px)
18 October 2015	Gold	Marathon	Scotiabank Toronto Waterfront Marathon	Toronto	Canada	[[]] (25x17px)	[[]] (25x17px)
18 October 2015	Silver	Half marathon	Medio Maraton Valencia Trinidad Alfonso	Valencia	Spain	[[]] (25x17px)	[[]] (25x17px)
18 October 2015	Gold	Marathon	TCS Amsterdam Marathon	Amsterdam	Netherlands	[[]] (25x17px)	[[]] (25x17px)
18 October 2015	Gold	Half marathon	RNR Half Marathon Vodafone RTP	Lisbon	Portugal	[[]] (25x17px)	[[]] (25x17px)
18 October 2015	Gold	Marathon	RNR Marathon of Lisbon EDP	Lisbon	Portugal	[[]] (25x17px)	[[]] (25x17px)
25 October 2015	Gold	10 miles	Great South Run	Portsmouth	United Kingdom	[[]] (25x17px)	[[]] (25x17px)
25 October 2015	Silver	Marathon	30th Venice Marathon	Venice	Italy	[[]] (25x17px)	[[]] (25x17px)
25 October 2015	Silver	20K run	Marseille Cassis 20km	Marseille	France	[[]] (25x17px)	[[]] (25x17px)
25 October 2015	Gold	Marathon	Frankfurt Marathon	Frankfurt	Germany	[[]] (25x17px)	[[]] (25x17px)
1 November 2015	Gold	Marathon	TCS New York City Marathon	New York City	United States	[[]] (25x17px)	[[]] (25x17px)
8 November 2015	Bronze	Marathon	Marathon des Alpes Maritimes Nice - Cannes	Nice	France	[[]] (25x17px)	[[]] (25x17px)
8 November 2015	Gold	Marathon	Shanghai International Marathon	Shanghai	China	[[]] (25x17px)	[[]] (25x17px)
8 November 2015	Silver	Marathon	BDL Beirut Marathon	Beirut	Lebanon	[[]] (25x17px)	[[]] (25x17px)
15 November 2015	Bronze	Half marathon	Semi-Marathon de Boulogne-Billancourt Christian Granger	Boulogne-Billancourt	France	Cancelled	Cancelled
15 November 2015	Gold	Marathon	Vodafone 37th Istanbul Marathon	Istanbul	Turkey	[[]] (25x17px)	[[]] (25x17px)
15 November 2015	Silver	Marathon	Maraton Valencia Trinidad Alfonso	Valencia	Spain	[[]] (25x17px)	[[]] (25x17px)
15 November 2015	Silver	Marathon	Saitama Marathon	Saitama	Japan	[[]] (25x17px)	[[]] (25x17px)
29 November 2015	Bronze	Marathon	Marathon du Gabon	Libreville	Gabon	[[]] (25x17px)	[[]] (25x17px)
6 December 2015	Gold	Marathon	Standard Chartered Singapore Marathon	Singapore	Singapore	[[]] (25x17px)	[[]] (25x17px)
6 December 2015	Gold	Marathon	The 69th Fukuoka International Open Marathon Championship	Fukuoka	Japan	[[]] (25x17px)	[[]] (25x17px)
27 December 2015	Silver	10K run	Corrida Pedestre Internationale de Houilles	Houilles	France	[[]] (25x17px)	[[]] (25x17px)
31 December 2015	Silver	10K run	50e San Silvestre Vallecana	Madrid	Spain	[[]] (25x17px)	[[]] (25x17px)
