= 2011 IAAF Road Race Label Events =

Road running competition series

The 2011 IAAF Road Race Label Events were the fourth edition of the global series of road running competitions given Label status by the International Association of Athletics Federations (IAAF). All five World Marathon Majors had Gold Label status. The series included a total of 65 road races: 26 Gold, 25 Silver and 14 Bronze. In terms of distance, 39 races were marathons, 13 were half marathons, 9 were 10K runs, and 4 were held over other distances.

The Yokohama Women's Marathon featured twice in the series, as the 2010 event was delayed from November to February 2011 due to a schedule clash with the APEC Japan 2010 meeting, also held in Yokohama.

== Races ==
- World Marathon Majors

Date	Label	Distance	Competition	Venue	Country	Men's winner	Women's winner
2 January 2011	Gold	Marathon	Xiamen International Marathon	Xiamen	China	[[]] (25x17px)	[[]] (25x17px)
16 January 2011	Gold	Marathon	Standard Chartered Mumbai Marathon	Mumbai	India	[[]] (25x17px)	[[]] (25x17px)
30 January 2011	Silver	Marathon	Osaka Women's Marathon	Osaka	Japan	[[]] (25x17px)	[[]] (25x17px)
6 February 2011	Silver	Marathon	60th Beppu-Oita Mainichi Marathon	Ōita	Japan	[[]] (25x17px)	[[]] (25x17px)
6 February 2011	Silver	Half marathon	Kagawa Marugame Half Marathon	Marugame	Japan	[[]] (25x17px)	[[]] (25x17px)
18 February 2011	Silver	Half marathon	RAK Half Marathon	Ras Al Khaimah	United Arab Emirates	[[]] (25x17px)	[[]] (25x17px)
20 February 2011	Silver	Marathon	Yokohama Women's Marathon	Yokohama	Japan	[[]] (25x17px)	[[]] (25x17px)
27 February 2011	Gold	10K run	World's Best 10k Race	San Juan	Puerto Rico	[[]] (25x17px)	[[]] (25x17px)
27 February 2011	Gold	Marathon	Tokyo Marathon	Tokyo	Japan	[[]] (25x17px)	[[]] (25x17px)
6 March 2011	Gold	Marathon	Lake Biwa Mainichi Marathon	Ōtsu	Japan	[[]] (25x17px)	[[]] (25x17px)
13 March 2011	Silver	Marathon	Nagoya Intl Women's Marathon	Nagoya	Japan	[[]] (25x17px)	[[]] (25x17px)
20 March 2011	Gold	Marathon	Maratona di Rome	Rome	Italy	[[]] (25x17px)	[[]] (25x17px)
20 March 2011	Gold	Marathon	Seoul International Marathon	Seoul	South Korea	[[]] (25x17px)	[[]] (25x17px)
20 March 2011	Gold	Half marathon	EDP Half Marathon of Lisbon	Lisbon	Portugal	[[]] (25x17px)	[[]] (25x17px)
2 April 2011	Gold	Half marathon	Hervis Prague Half Marathon	Prague	Czech Republic	[[]] (25x17px)	[[]] (25x17px)
10 April 2011	Gold	Marathon	Marathon International de Paris	Paris	France	[[]] (25x17px)	[[]] (25x17px)
10 April 2011	Bronze	Marathon	Mangyongdae Prize Marathon	Pyongyang	North Korea	[[]] (25x17px)	[[]] (25x17px)
10 April 2011	Bronze	10K run	SPAR Great Ireland Run	Dublin	Ireland	[[]] (25x17px)	[[]] (25x17px)
10 April 2011	Silver	Marathon	ABN AMRO Marathon Rotterdam	Rotterdam	Netherlands	[[]] (25x17px)	[[]] (25x17px)
10 April 2011	Bronze	Marathon	Intl. Marathon Alexander the Great	Thessaloniki	Greece	[[]] (25x17px)	[[]] (25x17px)
17 April 2011	Gold	Marathon	Virgin London Marathon	London	United Kingdom	[[]] (25x17px)	[[]] (25x17px)
17 April 2011	Silver	Marathon	Madrid Marathon	Madrid	Spain	[[]] (25x17px)	[[]] (25x17px)
18 April 2011	Gold	Marathon	B.A.A. Boston Marathon	Boston	United States	[[]] (25x17px)	[[]] (25x17px)
24 April 2011	Silver	Half marathon	Yangzhou Jianzhen International Half Marathon	Yangzhou	China	[[]] (25x17px)	[[]] (25x17px)
8 May 2011	Bronze	Marathon	Metro Group Marathon Düsseldorf	Düsseldorf	Germany	[[]] (25x17px)	[[]] (25x17px)
8 May 2011	Gold	Marathon	Volkswagen Prague Marathon	Prague	Czech Republic	[[]] (25x17px)	[[]] (25x17px)
15 May 2011	Gold	10K run	BUPA Great Manchester Run	Manchester	United Kingdom	[[]] (25x17px)	[[]] (25x17px)
28 May 2011	Silver	10K run	Ottawa 10K Road Race	Ottawa	Canada	[[]] (25x17px)	[[]] (25x17px)
29 May 2011	Silver	Marathon	Ottawa Marathon	Ottawa	Canada	[[]] (25x17px)	[[]] (25x17px)
4 June 2011	Silver	5K run	Freihofer's Run for Women 5K	Albany	United States	[[]] (25x17px)	[[]] (25x17px)
5 June 2011	Gold	10K run	TCS World 10K	Bangalore	India	[[]] (25x17px)	[[]] (25x17px)
25 June 2011	Bronze	10K run	Corrida de Langueux	Langueux	France	[[]] (25x17px)	[[]] (25x17px)
31 July 2011	Gold	Half marathon	Bogota Intl. Half Marathon	Bogotá	Colombia	[[]] (25x17px)	[[]] (25x17px)
10 September 2011	Silver	10K run	Metro 10Km	Prague	Czech Republic	[[]] (25x17px)	[[]] (25x17px)
11 September 2011	Bronze	Half marathon	Semi-Marathon Intl Auray-Vannes	Auray-Vannes	France	[[]] (25x17px)	[[]] (25x17px)
18 September 2011	Gold	Half marathon	BUPA Great North Run	Newcastle upon Tyne	United Kingdom	[[]] (25x17px)	[[]] (25x17px)
25 September 2011	Gold	Marathon	BMW Berlin Marathon	Berlin	Germany	[[]] (25x17px)	[[]] (25x17px)
25 September 2011	Gold	Half marathon	Vodafone Half Marathon of Portugal	Lisbon	Portugal	[[]] (25x17px)	[[]] (25x17px)
25 September 2011	Bronze	10K run	Singelloop Utrecht	Utrecht	Netherlands	[[]] (25x17px)	[[]] (25x17px)
9 October 2011	Gold	Marathon	Bank of America Chicago Marathon	Chicago	United States	[[]] (25x17px)	[[]] (25x17px)
9 October 2011	Bronze	20K run	20 Kilomètres de Paris	Paris	France	[[]] (25x17px)	[[]] (25x17px)
16 October 2011	Silver	Marathon	Scotiabank Toronto Waterfront Marathon	Toronto	Canada	[[]] (25x17px)	[[]] (25x17px)
16 October 2011	Silver	Marathon	Amsterdam Marathon	Amsterdam	Netherlands	[[]] (25x17px)	[[]] (25x17px)
16 October 2011	Silver	Marathon	Intercontinental Istanbul Eurasia Marathon	Istanbul	Turkey	[[]] (25x17px)	[[]] (25x17px)
16 October 2011	Silver	Marathon	Gyeongju International Marathon	Gyeongju	South Korea	[[]] (25x17px)	[[]] (25x17px)
16 October 2011	Gold	Marathon	Beijing Marathon	Beijing	China	[[]] (25x17px)	[[]] (25x17px)
16 October 2011	Bronze	Half marathon	Semi Marathon Intl de Reims à Toutes Jambes	Reims	France	[[]] (25x17px)	[[]] (25x17px)
23 October 2011	Silver	Marathon	Chosunilbo Chuncheon Intl. Marathon	Chuncheon	South Korea	[[]] (25x17px)	[[]] (25x17px)
23 October 2011	Silver	Marathon	Venice Marathon	Venice	Italy	[[]] (25x17px)	[[]] (25x17px)
30 October 2011	Gold	10 miles	BUPA Great South Run	Portsmouth	United Kingdom	[[]] (25x17px)	[[]] (25x17px)
30 October 2011	Silver	Half marathon	Marseille Cassis Classique Int.le	Marseille	France	[[]] (25x17px)	[[]] (25x17px)
30 October 2011	Gold	Marathon	BMW Frankfurt Marathon	Frankfurt	Germany	[[]] (25x17px)	[[]] (25x17px)
6 November 2011	Gold	Marathon	ING New York City Marathon	New York City	United States	[[]] (25x17px)	[[]] (25x17px)
6 November 2011	Silver	Marathon	Joongang Seoul Marathon	Seoul	South Korea	[[]] (25x17px)	[[]] (25x17px)
13 November 2011	Silver	Marathon	Turin Marathon	Turin	Italy	[[]] (25x17px)	[[]] (25x17px)
20 November 2011	Silver	Marathon	Yokohama Women's Marathon	Yokohama	Japan	[[]] (25x17px)	[[]] (25x17px)
20 November 2011	Bronze	15K run	ABN AMRO Zevenheuvelenloop	Nijmegen	Netherlands	[[]] (25x17px)	[[]] (25x17px)
20 November 2011	Bronze	Half marathon	Semi-Marathon de Boulogne-Billancourt	Boulogne-Billancourt	France	[[]] (25x17px)	[[]] (25x17px)
27 November 2011	Gold	Half marathon	Airtel Delhi Half Marathon	Delhi	India	[[]] (25x17px)	[[]] (25x17px)
27 November 2011	Bronze	Marathon	Marathon de La Rochelle Serge Vigot	La Rochelle	France	[[]] (25x17px)	[[]] (25x17px)
27 November 2011	Bronze	Marathon	Firenze Marathon	Florence	Italy	[[]] (25x17px)	[[]] (25x17px)
27 November 2011	Bronze	Marathon	Blom Beirut Marathon	Beirut	Lebanon	[[]] (25x17px)	[[]] (25x17px)
4 December 2011	Gold	Marathon	65th Fukuoka International Marathon	Fukuoka	Japan	[[]] (25x17px)	[[]] (25x17px)
4 December 2011	Silver	Marathon	Standard Chartered Singapore Marathon	Singapore	Singapore	[[]] (25x17px)	[[]] (25x17px)
31 December 2011	Silver	10K run	San Silvestre Vallecana	Madrid	Spain	[[]] (25x17px)	[[]] (25x17px)
