= 2012 IAAF Road Race Label Events =

Road running competition series

The 2012 IAAF Road Race Label Events were the fifth edition of the global series of road running competitions given Label status by the International Association of Athletics Federations (IAAF). All five World Marathon Majors had Gold Label status. The series included a total of 71 road races: 35 Gold, 21 Silver and 15 Bronze. In terms of distance, 44 races were marathons, 14 were half marathons, 10 were 10K runs, and 4 were held over other distances.

The 2012 New York City Marathon scheduled for 4 November was cancelled due to Hurricane Sandy.

== Races ==
- World Marathon Majors

Date	Label	Distance	Competition	Venue	Country	Men's winner	Women's winner
7 January 2012	Gold	Marathon	Xiamen International Marathon	Xiamen	China	[[]] (25x17px)	[[]] (25x17px)
15 January 2012	Gold	Marathon	Standard Chartered Mumbai Marathon	Mumbai	India	[[]] (25x17px)	[[]] (25x17px)
27 January 2012	Gold	Marathon	Standard Chartered Dubai Marathon	Dubai	United Arab Emirates	[[]] (25x17px)	[[]] (25x17px)
29 January 2012	Silver	Marathon	Osaka Women's Marathon	Osaka	Japan	[[]] (25x17px)	[[]] (25x17px)
5 February 2012	Silver	Half marathon	Kagawa Marugame Half Marathon	Marugame	Japan	[[]] (25x17px)	[[]] (25x17px)
5 February 2012	Silver	Marathon	61st Beppu-Oita Mainichi Marathon	Ōita	Japan	[[]] (25x17px)	[[]] (25x17px)
5 February 2012	Bronze	Marathon	Standard Chartered Hong Kong Marathon	Hong Kong	China	[[]] (25x17px)	[[]] (25x17px)
17 February 2012	Gold	Half marathon	RAK Half Marathon	Ras Al Khaimah	United Arab Emirates	[[]] (25x17px)	[[]] (25x17px)
26 February 2012	Gold	10K run	World's Best 10k Race	San Juan	Puerto Rico	[[]] (25x17px)	[[]] (25x17px)
26 February 2012	Gold	Marathon	Tokyo Marathon	Tokyo	Japan	[[]] (25x17px)	[[]] (25x17px)
26 February 2012	Silver	Half marathon	Rome-Ostia Half Marathon	Rome	Italy	[[]] (25x17px)	[[]] (25x17px)
4 March 2012	Gold	Marathon	Lake Biwa Mainichi Marathon	Ōtsu	Japan	[[]] (25x17px)	[[]] (25x17px)
11 March 2012	Gold	Marathon	Nagoya Women's Marathon	Nagoya	Japan	[[]] (25x17px)	[[]] (25x17px)
18 March 2012	Gold	Marathon	Maratona di Rome Acea	Rome	Italy	[[]] (25x17px)	[[]] (25x17px)
18 March 2012	Gold	Marathon	Seoul International Marathon	Seoul	South Korea	[[]] (25x17px)	[[]] (25x17px)
25 March 2012	Gold	Half marathon	EDP Half Marathon of Lisbon	Lisbon	Portugal	[[]] (25x17px)	[[]] (25x17px)
31 March 2012	Gold	Half marathon	Hervis Prague Half Marathon	Prague	Czech Republic	[[]] (25x17px)	[[]] (25x17px)
8 April 2012	Bronze	Marathon	Mangyongdae Prize Marathon	Pyongyang	North Korea	[[]] (25x17px)	[[]] (25x17px)
15 April 2012	Gold	Marathon	Marathon de Paris	Paris	France	[[]] (25x17px)	[[]] (25x17px)
15 April 2012	Silver	10K run	SPAR Great Ireland Run	Dublin	Ireland	[[]] (25x17px)	[[]] (25x17px)
15 April 2012	Silver	Marathon	ABN AMRO Marathon Rotterdam	Rotterdam	Netherlands	[[]] (25x17px)	[[]] (25x17px)
15 April 2012	Bronze	Marathon	Olympic Commemorative Marathon	Nagano	Japan	[[]] (25x17px)	[[]] (25x17px)
15 April 2012	Bronze	Marathon	Brighton Marathon	Brighton	United Kingdom	[[]] (25x17px)	[[]] (25x17px)
15 April 2012	Gold	Marathon	Vienna City Marathon	Vienna	Austria	[[]] (25x17px)	[[]] (25x17px)
16 April 2012	Gold	Marathon	B.A.A. Boston Marathon	Boston	United States	[[]] (25x17px)	[[]] (25x17px)
22 April 2012	Gold	Marathon	Virgin London Marathon	London	United Kingdom	[[]] (25x17px)	[[]] (25x17px)
22 April 2012	Silver	Marathon	Madrid Marathon	Madrid	Spain	[[]] (25x17px)	[[]] (25x17px)
29 April 2012	Bronze	Marathon	Metro Group Marathon Düsseldorf	Düsseldorf	Germany	[[]] (25x17px)	[[]] (25x17px)
29 April 2012	Silver	Half marathon	Yangzhou Jianzhen International Half Marathon	Yangzhou	China	[[]] (25x17px)	[[]] (25x17px)
6 May 2012	Bronze	Marathon	TUI Marathon Hannover	Hannover	Germany	[[]] (25x17px)	[[]] (25x17px)
13 May 2012	Gold	Marathon	Volkswagen Prague Marathon	Prague	Czech Republic	[[]] (25x17px)	[[]] (25x17px)
20 May 2012	Gold	10K run	BUPA Great Manchester Run	Manchester	United Kingdom	[[]] (25x17px)	[[]] (25x17px)
20 May 2012	Bronze	Marathon	Nordea Riga Marathon	Riga	Latvia	[[]] (25x17px)	[[]] (25x17px)
26 May 2012	Silver	10K run	Ottawa 10K Road Race	Ottawa	Canada	[[]] (25x17px)	[[]] (25x17px)
27 May 2012	Gold	10K run	TCS World 10K Bangalore	Bangalore	India	[[]] (25x17px)	[[]] (25x17px)
27 May 2012	Silver	Marathon	Ottawa Marathon	Ottawa	Canada	[[]] (25x17px)	[[]] (25x17px)
2 June 2012	Silver	5K run	Freihofer's Run for Women 5K	Albany	United States	[[]] (25x17px)	[[]] (25x17px)
23 June 2012	Bronze	10K run	Corrida de Langueux - Côtes d'Armor	Langueux	France	[[]] (25x17px)	[[]] (25x17px)
23 June 2012	Bronze	10K run	Vidovdan Road Race	Brčko	Bosnia and Herzegovina	[[]] (25x17px)	[[]] (25x17px)
29 July 2012	Gold	Half marathon	Bogota Intl. Half Marathon	Bogotá	Colombia	[[]] (25x17px)	[[]] (25x17px)
12 August 2012	Bronze	Marathon	Siberian International Marathon	Omsk	Russia	[[]] (25x17px)	[[]] (25x17px)
8 September 2012	Silver	10K run	Metro 10Km	Prague	Czech Republic	[[]] (25x17px)	[[]] (25x17px)
9 September 2012	Bronze	Half marathon	Semi-Marathon Intl Auray-Vannes	Auray-Vannes	France	[[]] (25x17px)	[[]] (25x17px)
16 September 2012	Gold	Half marathon	BUPA Great North Run	Newcastle upon Tyne	United Kingdom	[[]] (25x17px)	[[]] (25x17px)
16 September 2012	Gold	10K run	Giro Podistico Internazionale di Castelbuono	Castelbuono	Italy	[[]] (25x17px)	[[]] (25x17px)
30 September 2012	Gold	Marathon	BMW Berlin Marathon	Berlin	Germany	[[]] (25x17px)	[[]] (25x17px)
30 September 2012	Gold	Half marathon	Rock "N" Roll Portugal Half Marathon	Lisbon	Portugal	[[]] (25x17px)	[[]] (25x17px)
30 September 2012	Gold	Half marathon	Airtel Delhi Half Marathon	Delhi	India	[[]] (25x17px)	[[]] (25x17px)
7 October 2012	Gold	Marathon	Bank of America Chicago Marathon	Chicago	United States	[[]] (25x17px)	[[]] (25x17px)
14 October 2012	Silver	Marathon	Scotiabank Toronto Waterfront Marathon	Toronto	Canada	[[]] (25x17px)	[[]] (25x17px)
14 October 2012	Bronze	20K run	20 Kilomètres de Paris	Paris	France	[[]] (25x17px)	[[]] (25x17px)
14 October 2012	Silver	Marathon	Marathon Eindhoven	Eindhoven	Netherlands	[[]] (25x17px)	[[]] (25x17px)
21 October 2012	Silver	Marathon	Gyeongju International Marathon	Gyeongju	South Korea	[[]] (25x17px)	[[]] (25x17px)
21 October 2012	Bronze	Half marathon	BUPA Great Birmingham Run	Birmingham	United Kingdom	[[]] (25x17px)	[[]] (25x17px)
21 October 2012	Silver	Marathon	TCS Amsterdam Marathon	Amsterdam	Netherlands	[[]] (25x17px)	[[]] (25x17px)
28 October 2012	Gold	10 miles	BUPA Great South Run	Portsmouth	United Kingdom	[[]] (25x17px)	[[]] (25x17px)
28 October 2012	Silver	Half marathon	Marseille Cassis Classique Int.le	Marseille	France	[[]] (25x17px)	[[]] (25x17px)
28 October 2012	Silver	Marathon	Venice Marathon	Venice	Italy	[[]] (25x17px)	[[]] (25x17px)
28 October 2012	Gold	Marathon	Chosunilbo Chuncheon Intl. Marathon	Chuncheon	South Korea	[[]] (25x17px)	[[]] (25x17px)
28 October 2012	Gold	Marathon	BMW Frankfurt Marathon	Frankfurt	Germany	[[]] (25x17px)	[[]] (25x17px)
4 November 2012	Gold	Marathon	ING New York City Marathon	New York City	United States	Cancelled	Cancelled
4 November 2012	Silver	Marathon	Joongang Seoul Marathon	Seoul	South Korea	[[]] (25x17px)	[[]] (25x17px)
11 November 2012	Gold	Marathon	34th Intercontinental Istanbul Eurasia Marathon	Istanbul	Turkey	[[]] (25x17px)	[[]] (25x17px)
11 November 2012	Bronze	Marathon	Blom Beirut Marathon	Beirut	Lebanon	[[]] (25x17px)	[[]] (25x17px)
18 November 2012	Bronze	Half marathon	Semi-Marathon de Boulogne-Billancourt	Boulogne-Billancourt	France	[[]] (25x17px)	[[]] (25x17px)
18 November 2012	Silver	Marathon	Yokohama Women's Marathon	Yokohama	Japan	[[]] (25x17px)	[[]] (25x17px)
18 November 2012	Gold	Marathon	Turin Marathon	Turin	Italy	[[]] (25x17px)	[[]] (25x17px)
25 November 2012	Gold	Marathon	Beijing Marathon	Beijing	China	[[]] (25x17px)	[[]] (25x17px)
2 December 2012	Gold	Marathon	66th Fukuoka International Marathon	Fukuoka	Japan	[[]] (25x17px)	[[]] (25x17px)
2 December 2012	Gold	Marathon	Standard Chartered Singapore Marathon	Singapore	Singapore	[[]] (25x17px)	[[]] (25x17px)
31 December 2012	Silver	10K run	San Silvestre Vallecana	Madrid	Spain	[[]] (25x17px)	[[]] (25x17px)
