= 2009 IAAF Road Race Label Events =

Road running competition series

The 2009 IAAF Road Race Label Events were the second edition of the global series of road running competitions given Label status by the International Association of Athletics Federations (IAAF). All five World Marathon Majors had Gold Label status. The series included a total of 49 road races, 19 Gold and 30 Silver. In terms of distance, 34 races were marathons, 8 were half marathons, 5 were 10K runs, and 2 were held over other distances.

== Races ==
- World Marathon Majors

Date	Label	Distance	Competition	Venue	Country	Men's winner	Women's winner
3 January 2009	Gold	Marathon	Xiamen International Marathon	Xiamen	China	Samuel Muturi Mugo (KEN)	Chen Rong (CHN)
18 January 2009	Silver	Marathon	Standard Chartered Mumbai Marathon	Mumbai	India	Kenneth Mburu Mungara (KEN)	Kebebush Haile (ETH)
25 January 2009	Silver	Marathon	Osaka Intl Ladies Marathon	Osaka	Japan	—	Yōko Shibui (JPN)
1 February 2009	Silver	Marathon	58th Beppu-Oita Mainichi Marathon	Kitakyushu	Japan	Adil Annani (MAR)	—
20 February 2009	Silver	Half marathon	RAK Half Marathon	Ras Al Khaimah	United Arab Emirates	Patrick Makau Musyoki (KEN)	Dire Tune (ETH)
1 March 2009	Gold	10K run	World's Best 10k Race	San Juan	Puerto Rico	Sammy Kitwara (KEN)	Vivian Cheruiyot (KEN)
1 March 2009	Gold	Marathon	Lake Biwa Mainichi Marathon	Osaka	Japan	Paul Tergat (KEN)	—
8 March 2009	Silver	Marathon	Nagoya Intl Women's Marathon	Nagoya	Japan	—	Yoshiko Fujinaga (JPN)
15 March 2009	Silver	Marathon	Seoul International Marathon	Seoul	South Korea	Moses Kimeli Arusei (KEN)	Robe Guta (ETH)
22 March 2009	Silver	Marathon	Maratona di Rome	Rome	Italy	Benjamin Kiptoo (KEN)	Firehiwot Dado (ETH)
22 March 2009	Gold	Half marathon	EDP Half Marathon of Lisbon	Lisbon	Portugal	Martin Lel (KEN)	Kara Goucher (USA)
22 March 2009	Silver	Marathon	Tokyo Marathon	Tokyo	Japan	Salim Kipsang (KEN)	Mizuho Nasukawa (JPN)
28 March 2009	Silver	Half marathon	Hervis Prague Half Marathon	Prague	Czech Republic	Nicholas Kipruto Koech (KEN)	Rose Kosgei (KEN)
5 April 2009	Silver	Marathon	Fortis Rotterdam Marathon	Rotterdam	Netherlands	Duncan Kibet (KEN)	Nailiya Yulamanova (RUS)
5 April 2009	Gold	Marathon	Marathon International de Paris	Paris	France	Vincent Kipruto (KEN)	Atsede Baysa (ETH)
19 April 2009	Silver	Marathon	Vienna City Marathon	Vienna	Austria	Gilbert Kirwa (KEN)	Andrea Mayr (AUT)
19 April 2009	Silver	Marathon	Nagano Olympic Commemorative Marathon	Nagano	Japan	Isaac Wanjohi Macharia (KEN)	Irina Timofeyeva (RUS)
19 April 2009	Silver	Marathon	Turin Marathon	Turin	Italy	Benson Barus (KEN)	Agnes Kiprop (KEN)
20 April 2009	Gold	Marathon	B.A.A. Boston Marathon	Boston	United States	Deriba Merga (ETH)	Salina Kosgei (KEN)
26 April 2009	Gold	Marathon	Marathon Hamburg	Hamburg	Germany	Solomon Tsige (ETH)	Alessandra Aguilar (ESP)
26 April 2009	Silver	Marathon	Madrid Marathon	Madrid	Spain	Khalid Kamal Yaseen (BHR)	Mehtap Doğan-Sızmaz (TUR)
26 April 2009	Gold	Marathon	Flora London Marathon	London	United Kingdom	Samuel Wanjiru (KEN)	Irina Mikitenko (GER)
10 May 2009	Silver	Marathon	Volkswagen Prague Marathon	Prague	Czech Republic	Patrick Ivuti (KEN)	Olga Glok (RUS)
17 May 2009	Gold	10K run	Bupa Great Manchester Run	Manchester	United Kingdom	Haile Gebrselassie (ETH)	Vivian Cheruiyot (KEN)
23 May 2009	Silver	10K run	Nordion 10K	Ottawa	Canada	Deriba Merga (ETH)	Teyba Erkesso (ETH)
24 May 2009	Silver	Marathon	Ottawa Marathon	Ottawa	Canada	David Emmanuel Cheruiyot (KEN)	Asmae Leghzaoui (MAR)
30 May 2009	Silver	5K run	Freihofer's Run for Women	Albany	United States	—	Teyba Erkesso (ETH)
2 August 2009	Gold	Half marathon	Bogota International Half Marathon	Bogotá	Colombia	Isaac Macharia Wanjohi (KEN)	Lydia Cheromei (KEN)
12 September 2009	Silver	10K run	Metro Men's Race 10km	Prague	Czech Republic	Dickson Marwa Mkami (KEN)	—
20 September 2009	Gold	Marathon	real,- Berlin-Marathon	Berlin	Germany	Haile Gebrselassie (ETH)	Atsede Habtamu (ETH)
20 September 2009	Gold	Half marathon	Bupa Great North Run	Newcastle upon Tyne	United Kingdom	Martin Lel (KEN)	Jéssica Augusto (POR)
27 September 2009	Silver	Marathon	Scotiabank Toronto Waterfront Marathon	Toronto	Canada	Kenneth Mburu Mungara (KEN)	Amane Gobena (ETH)
4 October 2009	Silver	Marathon	Köln Marathon präsentiert von der Sparkasse KölnBonn	Cologne	Germany	Evans Kipkosgei Ruto (KEN)	Sabrina Mockenhaupt (GER)
4 October 2009	Gold	Half marathon	Half Marathon Vodafone	Lisbon	Portugal	Silas Sang (KEN)	Helena Kirop (KEN)
11 October 2009	Gold	Marathon	Bank of America Chicago Marathon	Chicago	United States	Samuel Wanjiru (KEN)	Irina Mikitenko (GER)
18 October 2009	Silver	Marathon	Amsterdam Marathon	Amsterdam	Netherlands	Gilbert Yegon (KEN)	Eyerusalem Kuma (ETH)
18 October 2009	Gold	Marathon	Beijing International Marathon	Beijing	China	Samuel Muturi Mugo (KEN)	Bai Xue (CHN)
18 October 2009	Silver	Marathon	31st Intercontinental Istanbul Eurasia Marathon	Istanbul	Turkey	Kasime Adilo (ETH)	Bizunesh Urgesa (ETH)
25 October 2009	Silver	Half marathon	Classique Internationale Marseille-Cassis	Marseille	France	Dieudonné Disi (RWA)	Meseret Mengistu (ETH)
25 October 2009	Gold	Marathon	Commerzbank Frankfurt Marathon	Frankfurt	Germany	Gilbert Kirwa (KEN)	Agnes Kiprop (KEN)
25 October 2009	Gold	10 miles	Bupa Great South Run	Portsmouth	United Kingdom	Mo Farah (GBR)	Inês Monteiro (POR)
25 October 2009	Silver	Marathon	Venice Marathon	Venice	Italy	John Kipkorir Komen (KEN)	Anne Kosgei (KEN)
1 November 2009	Gold	Half marathon	Airtel Delhi Half Marathon	Delhi	India	Deriba Merga (ETH)	Mary Jepkosgei Keitany (KEN)
1 November 2009	Gold	Marathon	ING New York City Marathon	New York City	United States	Meb Keflezighi (USA)	Derartu Tulu (ETH)
1 November 2009	Silver	Marathon	JoongAng Seoul Marathon	Seoul	South Korea	Francis Kibiwott Larabal (KEN)	Lee Sun-young (KOR)
8 November 2009	Silver	Marathon	Athens Classic Marathon	Athens	Greece	Josephat Kipkurui Ngetich (KEN)	Akemi Ozaki (JPN)
6 December 2009	Silver	Marathon	Fukuoka Intl Open Marathon Champs	Fukuoka	Japan	Tsegaye Kebede (ETH)	—
6 December 2009	Silver	Marathon	Singapore Marathon	Singapore	Singapore	Luke Kibet (KEN)	Albina Mayorova (RUS)
31 December 2009	Silver	10K run	San Silvestre Vallecana	Madrid	Spain	Moses Ndiema Masai (KEN)	Vivian Cheruiyot (KEN)
