= 2013 IAAF Road Race Label Events =

The 2013 IAAF Road Race Label Events were the sixth edition of the global series of road running competitions given Label status by the International Association of Athletics Federations (IAAF). All six World Marathon Majors had Gold Label status. The series included a total of 74 road races: 36 Gold, 21 Silver and 17 Bronze. In terms of distance, 46 races were marathons, 12 were half marathons, 11 were 10K runs, and 5 were held over other distances.

== Races ==
- World Marathon Majors

Date	Label	Distance	Competition	Venue	Country	Men's winner	Women's winner
5 January 2013	Gold	Marathon	Xiamen International Marathon	Xiamen	China	[[]] (25x17px)	[[]] (25x17px)
25 January 2013	Gold	Marathon	Standard Chartered Dubai Marathon	Dubai	United Arab Emirates	[[]] (25x17px)	[[]] (25x17px)
27 January 2013	Silver	Marathon	Osaka Women's Marathon	Osaka	Japan	[[]] (25x17px)	[[]] (25x17px)
3 February 2013	Silver	Half marathon	Kagawa Marugame Half Marathon	Marugame	Japan	[[]] (25x17px)	[[]] (25x17px)
3 February 2013	Silver	Marathon	62nd Beppu-Oita Mainichi Marathon	Ōita	Japan	[[]] (25x17px)	[[]] (25x17px)
24 February 2013	Silver	Marathon	Standard Chartered Hong Kong Marathon	Hong Kong	China	[[]] (25x17px)	[[]] (25x17px)
24 February 2013	Gold	10K run	World's Best 10k Race	San Juan	Puerto Rico	[[]] (25x17px)	[[]] (25x17px)
24 February 2013	Gold	Marathon	Tokyo Marathon	Tokyo	Japan	[[]] (25x17px)	[[]] (25x17px)
3 March 2013	Gold	Half marathon	Roma-Ostia Half Marathon	Rome	Italy	[[]] (25x17px)	[[]] (25x17px)
3 March 2013	Gold	Marathon	Lake Biwa Mainichi Marathon	Ōtsu	Japan	[[]] (25x17px)	[[]] (25x17px)
10 March 2013	Gold	Marathon	Nagoya Women's Marathon	Nagoya	Japan	[[]] (25x17px)	[[]] (25x17px)
17 March 2013	Gold	Marathon	Maratona di Roma Acea	Rome	Italy	[[]] (25x17px)	[[]] (25x17px)
17 March 2013	Gold	Marathon	Seoul International Marathon	Seoul	South Korea	[[]] (25x17px)	[[]] (25x17px)
24 March 2013	Gold	Half marathon	EDP Half Marathon of Lisbon	Lisbon	Portugal	[[]] (25x17px)	[[]] (25x17px)
6 April 2013	Gold	Half marathon	Hervis Prague Half Marathon	Prague	Czech Republic	[[]] (25x17px)	[[]] (25x17px)
7 April 2013	Bronze	Marathon	Maraton de Santiago	Santiago	Chile	[[]] (25x17px)	[[]] (25x17px)
7 April 2013	Gold	Marathon	Marathon de Paris	Paris	France	[[]] (25x17px)	[[]] (25x17px)
14 April 2013	Bronze	Marathon	Mangyongdae Prize Marathon	Pyongyang	North Korea	[[]] (25x17px)	[[]] (25x17px)
14 April 2013	Silver	10K run	SPAR Great Ireland Run	Dublin	Ireland	[[]] (25x17px)	[[]] (25x17px)
14 April 2013	Gold	Marathon	ABN AMRO Marathon Rotterdam	Rotterdam	Netherlands	[[]] (25x17px)	[[]] (25x17px)
14 April 2013	Bronze	Marathon	The Brighton Marathon	Brighton	United Kingdom	[[]] (25x17px)	[[]] (25x17px)
14 April 2013	Gold	Marathon	Vienna City Marathon	Vienna	Austria	[[]] (25x17px)	[[]] (25x17px)
14 April 2013	Silver	Marathon	Daegu International Marathon	Daegu	South Korea	[[]] (25x17px)	[[]] (25x17px)
15 April 2013	Gold	Marathon	B.A.A. Boston Marathon	Boston	United States	[[]] (25x17px)	[[]] (25x17px)
21 April 2013	Bronze	Marathon	Nagano Olympic Commemorative Marathon	Nagano	Japan	[[]] (25x17px)	[[]] (25x17px)
21 April 2013	Gold	Half marathon	Yangzhou Jianzhen International Half Marathon	Yangzhou	China	[[]] (25x17px)	[[]] (25x17px)
21 April 2013	Gold	Marathon	28th Haspa Hamburg Marathon	Hamburg	Germany	[[]] (25x17px)	[[]] (25x17px)
21 April 2013	Gold	Marathon	Virgin London Marathon	London	United Kingdom	[[]] (25x17px)	[[]] (25x17px)
28 April 2013	Silver	Marathon	Rock 'n' Roll Madrid Marathon	Madrid	Spain	[[]] (25x17px)	[[]] (25x17px)
28 April 2013	Bronze	Marathon	Metro Group Marathon Düsseldorf	Düsseldorf	Germany	[[]] (25x17px)	[[]] (25x17px)
5 May 2013	Bronze	Marathon	TUI Marathon Hannover	Hannover	Germany	[[]] (25x17px)	[[]] (25x17px)
12 May 2013	Gold	Marathon	Volkswagen Prague Marathon	Prague	Czech Republic	[[]] (25x17px)	[[]] (25x17px)
19 May 2013	Bronze	Marathon	Nordea Riga Marathon	Riga	Latvia	[[]] (25x17px)	[[]] (25x17px)
19 May 2013	Bronze	Half marathon	Gifu Seiryu Half Marathon	Gifu	Japan	[[]] (25x17px)	[[]] (25x17px)
25 May 2013	Silver	10K run	Ottawa 10K Road Race	Ottawa	Canada	[[]] (25x17px)	[[]] (25x17px)
26 May 2013	Silver	Marathon	Ottawa Marathon	Ottawa	Canada	[[]] (25x17px)	[[]] (25x17px)
26 May 2013	Gold	10K run	BUPA Great Manchester Run	Manchester	United Kingdom	[[]] (25x17px)	[[]] (25x17px)
26 May 2013	Bronze	Marathon	The Edinburgh Marathon	Edinburgh	United Kingdom	[[]] (25x17px)	[[]] (25x17px)
1 June 2013	Silver	5K run	Freihofer's Run for Women 5K	Albany	United States	[[]] (25x17px)	[[]] (25x17px)
22 June 2013	Silver	Half marathon	Mattoni Half Marathon Olomouc	Olomouc	Czech Republic	[[]] (25x17px)	[[]] (25x17px)
22 June 2013	Bronze	10K run	Corrida de Langueux - Côtes d'Armor	Langueux	France	[[]] (25x17px)	[[]] (25x17px)
22 June 2013	Bronze	10K run	Vidovdan Road Race	Brčko	Bosnia and Herzegovina	[[]] (25x17px)	[[]] (25x17px)
26 July 2013	Gold	10K run	Giro Podistico Internazionale di Castelbuono	Castelbuono	Italy	[[]] (25x17px)	[[]] (25x17px)
28 July 2013	Gold	Half marathon	Bogota Intl. Half Marathon	Bogotá	Colombia	[[]] (25x17px)	[[]] (25x17px)
7 September 2013	Silver	10K run	O² Prague Grand Prix	Prague	Czech Republic	[[]] (25x17px)	[[]] (25x17px)
15 September 2013	Silver	Half marathon	Mattoni Ústí nad Labem Half Marathon	Ústí nad Labem	Czech Republic	[[]] (25x17px)	[[]] (25x17px)
15 September 2013	Gold	Half marathon	BUPA Great North Run	Newcastle upon Tyne	United Kingdom	[[]] (25x17px)	[[]] (25x17px)
22 September 2013	Bronze	Marathon	Siberian International Marathon	Omsk	Russia	[[]] (25x17px)	[[]] (25x17px)
22 September 2013	Silver	10 miles	Dam tot Damloop	Amsterdam	Netherlands	[[]] (25x17px)	[[]] (25x17px)
29 September 2013	Gold	Marathon	BMW Berlin Marathon	Berlin	Germany	[[]] (25x17px)	[[]] (25x17px)
29 September 2013	Gold	10K run	Carrera de la Mujer	Bogotá	Colombia	[[]] (25x17px)	[[]] (25x17px)
6 October 2013	Gold	Half marathon	Rock 'n' Roll Vodafone Half Marathon of Portugal	Lisbon	Portugal	[[]] (25x17px)	[[]] (25x17px)
13 October 2013	Bronze	20K run	20 Kilomètres de Paris	Paris	France	[[]] (25x17px)	[[]] (25x17px)
13 October 2013	Gold	Marathon	Bank of America Chicago Marathon	Chicago	United States	[[]] (25x17px)	[[]] (25x17px)
13 October 2013	Silver	Marathon	RheinEnergie Marathon	Cologne	Germany	[[]] (25x17px)	[[]] (25x17px)
20 October 2013	Gold	Marathon	Beijing Marathon	Beijing	China	[[]] (25x17px)	[[]] (25x17px)
20 October 2013	Gold	Marathon	TCS Amsterdam Marathon	Amsterdam	Netherlands	[[]] (25x17px)	[[]] (25x17px)
20 October 2013	Silver	Half marathon	BUPA Great Birmingham Run	Birmingham	United Kingdom	[[]] (25x17px)	[[]] (25x17px)
20 October 2013	Silver	Marathon	Scotiabank Toronto Waterfront Marathon	Toronto	Canada	[[]] (25x17px)	[[]] (25x17px)
27 October 2013	Gold	10 miles	BUPA Great South Run	Portsmouth	United Kingdom	[[]] (25x17px)	[[]] (25x17px)
27 October 2013	Silver	20K run	Marseille Cassis 20km	Marseille	France	[[]] (25x17px)	[[]] (25x17px)
27 October 2013	Gold	Marathon	BMW Frankfurt Marathon	Frankfurt	Germany	[[]] (25x17px)	[[]] (25x17px)
27 October 2013	Silver	Marathon	28th Venice Marathon	Venice	Italy	[[]] (25x17px)	[[]] (25x17px)
3 November 2013	Gold	Marathon	ING New York City Marathon	New York City	United States	[[]] (25x17px)	[[]] (25x17px)
10 November 2013	Bronze	Marathon	Banque du Liban Beirut Marathon	Beirut	Lebanon	[[]] (25x17px)	[[]] (25x17px)
10 November 2013	Bronze	Marathon	Marathon des Alpes-Maritimes Nice-Cannes	Nice	France	[[]] (25x17px)	[[]] (25x17px)
17 November 2013	Silver	Marathon	5th Yokohama Women's Marathon	Yokohama	Japan	[[]] (25x17px)	[[]] (25x17px)
17 November 2013	Gold	Marathon	35th Vodafone Istanbul Eurasia Marathon	Istanbul	Turkey	[[]] (25x17px)	[[]] (25x17px)
17 November 2013	Bronze	Marathon	Maraton Divina Pastora Valencia	Valencia	Spain	[[]] (25x17px)	[[]] (25x17px)
1 December 2013	Gold	Marathon	67th Fukuoka International Marathon	Fukuoka	Japan	[[]] (25x17px)	[[]] (25x17px)
1 December 2013	Gold	Marathon	Standard Chartered Singapore Marathon	Singapore	Singapore	[[]] (25x17px)	[[]] (25x17px)
1 December 2013	Gold	Marathon	Shanghai International Marathon	Shanghai	China	[[]] (25x17px)	[[]] (25x17px)
29 December 2013	Bronze	10K run	Corrida Pedestre Internationale de Houilles	Houilles	France	[[]] (25x17px)	[[]] (25x17px)
31 December 2013	Silver	10K run	San Silvestre Vallecana	Madrid	Spain	[[]] (25x17px)	[[]] (25x17px)
