= 2016 IAAF Road Race Label Events =

Road running competition series

The 2016 IAAF Road Race Label Events were the ninth edition of the global series of road running competitions given Label status by the International Association of Athletics Federations (IAAF). The series included all six World Marathon Majors in the Gold category. The series included a total of 88 road races: 44 Gold, 17 Silver and 27 Bronze. In terms of distance, 59 races were marathons, 19 were half marathons, 8 were 10K runs, and 2 were held over other distances.

== Races ==
- World Marathon Majors

Date	Label	Distance	Competition	Venue	Country	Men's winner	Women's winner
2 January 2016	Gold	Marathon	Xiamen International Marathon	Xiamen	China	[[]] (25x17px)	[[]] (25x17px)
17 January 2016	Gold	Marathon	Standard Chartered Hong Kong Marathon	Hong Kong	China	[[]] (25x17px)	[[]] (25x17px)
17 January 2016	Bronze	Marathon	Chevron Houston Marathon	Houston	United States	[[]] (25x17px)	[[]] (25x17px)
22 January 2016	Gold	Marathon	Standard Chartered Dubai Marathon	Dubai	United Arab Emirates	[[]] (25x17px)	[[]] (25x17px)
31 January 2016	Silver	Marathon	Osaka Women's Marathon	Osaka	Japan	[[]] (25x17px)	[[]] (25x17px)
7 February 2016	Silver	Half marathon	Kagawa Marugame International Half Marathon	Marugame	Japan	[[]] (25x17px)	[[]] (25x17px)
14 February 2016	Bronze	Half marathon	eDreams Mitja Marató de Barcelona	Barcelona	Spain	[[]] (25x17px)	[[]] (25x17px)
21 February 2016	Bronze	Marathon	Zurich Marato de Sevilla	Seville	Spain	[[]] (25x17px)	[[]] (25x17px)
28 February 2016	Gold	Marathon	Tokyo Marathon	Tokyo	Japan	[[]] (25x17px)	[[]] (25x17px)
28 February 2016	Gold	10K run	World's Best 10K	San Juan	Puerto Rico	[[]] (25x17px)	[[]] (25x17px)
6 March 2016	Gold	Marathon	Lake Biwa Mainichi Marathon	Ōtsu	Japan	[[]] (25x17px)	[[]] (25x17px)
13 March 2016	Gold	Half marathon	RomaOstia Half Marathon	Rome	Italy	[[]] (25x17px)	[[]] (25x17px)
13 March 2016	Gold	Marathon	Nagoya Women's Marathon	Nagoya	Japan	[[]] (25x17px)	[[]] (25x17px)
13 March 2016	Bronze	Marathon	Zurich Marató Barcelona	Barcelona	Spain	[[]] (25x17px)	[[]] (25x17px)
20 March 2016	Gold	Marathon	Seoul International Marathon	Seoul	South Korea	[[]] (25x17px)	[[]] (25x17px)
20 March 2016	Gold	Half marathon	EDP Half Marathon of Lisbon	Lisbon	Portugal	[[]] (25x17px)	[[]] (25x17px)
20 March 2016	Bronze	Marathon	New Taipei Wan Jin Shi Marathon	New Taipei City	Taiwan	[[]] (25x17px)	[[]] (25x17px)
20 March 2016	Bronze	Marathon	Chongqing International Marathon	Chongqing	China	[[]] (25x17px)	[[]] (25x17px)
2 April 2016	Gold	Half marathon	Sportisimo Prague Half Marathon	Prague	Czech Republic	[[]] (25x17px)	[[]] (25x17px)
3 April 2016	Silver	Marathon	Daegu International Marathon	Daegu	South Korea	[[]] (25x17px)	[[]] (25x17px)
3 April 2016	Bronze	Marathon	Milan Marathon	Milan	Italy	[[]] (25x17px)	[[]] (25x17px)
3 April 2016	Gold	Marathon	Schneider Electric Marathon de Paris	Paris	France	[[]] (25x17px)	[[]] (25x17px)
10 April 2016	Gold	Marathon	Maratona di Roma	Rome	Italy	[[]] (25x17px)	[[]] (25x17px)
10 April 2016	Gold	Marathon	Vienna City Marathon	Vienna	Austria	[[]] (25x17px)	[[]] (25x17px)
10 April 2016	Silver	Marathon	HAJ Hannover Marathon	Hannover	Germany	[[]] (25x17px)	[[]] (25x17px)
10 April 2016	Gold	Marathon	NN Marathon Rotterdam	Rotterdam	Netherlands	[[]] (25x17px)	[[]] (25x17px)
17 April 2016	Silver	Marathon	DOZ Marathon Lodz with PZU	Łódź	Poland	[[]] (25x17px)	[[]] (25x17px)
17 April 2016	Bronze	Marathon	Brighton Marathon	Brighton	United Kingdom	[[]] (25x17px)	[[]] (25x17px)
17 April 2016	Bronze	Marathon	Nagano Marathon	Nagano	Japan	[[]] (25x17px)	[[]] (25x17px)
18 April 2016	Gold	Marathon	B.A.A. Boston Marathon	Boston	United States	[[]] (25x17px)	[[]] (25x17px)
24 April 2016	Gold	Half marathon	Yangzhou Jianzhen International Half Marathon	Yangzhou	China	[[]] (25x17px)	[[]] (25x17px)
24 April 2016	Silver	Marathon	Rock N Roll Madrid Maraton	Madrid	Spain	[[]] (25x17px)	[[]] (25x17px)
24 April 2016	Silver	Marathon	Orlen Warsaw Marathon	Warsaw	Poland	[[]] (25x17px)	[[]] (25x17px)
24 April 2016	Bronze	Half marathon	Vodafone Istanbul Half Marathon	Istanbul	Turkey	[[]] (25x17px)	[[]] (25x17px)
24 April 2016	Gold	Marathon	Virgin Money London Marathon	London	United Kingdom	[[]] (25x17px)	[[]] (25x17px)
7 May 2016	Bronze	10K run	Okpekpe Intn'l 10km Road Race	Okpekpe	Nigeria	[[]] (25x17px)	[[]] (25x17px)
8 May 2016	Bronze	Marathon	Harmony Geneva Marathon for Unicef	Geneva	Switzerland	[[]] (25x17px)	[[]] (25x17px)
8 May 2016	Silver	Marathon	Yellow River Estuary International Marathon	Dongying	China	[[]] (25x17px)	[[]] (25x17px)
8 May 2016	Gold	Marathon	Volkswagen Prague Marathon	Prague	Czech Republic	[[]] (25x17px)	[[]] (25x17px)
15 May 2016	Bronze	Marathon	Lattelecom Riga Marathon	Riga	Latvia	[[]] (25x17px)	[[]] (25x17px)
15 May 2016	Silver	Half marathon	Gifu Seiryu Half Marathon	Gifu	Japan	[[]] (25x17px)	[[]] (25x17px)
21 May 2016	Gold	Half marathon	Mattoni Karlovy Vary Half Marathon	Karlovy Vary	Czech Republic	[[]] (25x17px)	[[]] (25x17px)
28 May 2016	Gold	10K run	Ottawa 10K	Ottawa	Canada	[[]] (25x17px)	[[]] (25x17px)
29 May 2016	Gold	Marathon	Ottawa Marathon	Ottawa	Canada	[[]] (25x17px)	[[]] (25x17px)
29 May 2016	Bronze	Marathon	The Edinburgh Marathon	Edinburgh	United Kingdom	[[]] (25x17px)	[[]] (25x17px)
4 June 2016	Gold	Half marathon	Mattoni Ceske Budejovice Half Marathon	České Budějovice	Czech Republic	[[]] (25x17px)	[[]] (25x17px)
11 June 2016	Bronze	Marathon	Lanzhou International Marathon	Lanzhou	China	[[]] (25x17px)	[[]] (25x17px)
18 June 2016	Bronze	10K run	Corrida de Langueux	Langueux	France	[[]] (25x17px)	[[]] (25x17px)
25 June 2016	Gold	Half marathon	Mattoni Olomouc Half Marathon	Olomouc	Czech Republic	[[]] (25x17px)	[[]] (25x17px)
26 June 2016	Bronze	10K run	B.A.A. 10K	Boston	United States	[[]] (25x17px)	[[]] (25x17px)
3 July 2016	Gold	Marathon	Gold Coast Airport Marathon	Gold Coast	Australia	[[]] (25x17px)	[[]] (25x17px)
31 July 2016	Gold	Half marathon	Media Maraton de Bogota	Bogotá	Colombia	[[]] (25x17px)	[[]] (25x17px)
28 August 2016	Bronze	Marathon	Telcel Mexico City Marathon	Mexico City	Mexico	[[]] (25x17px)	[[]] (25x17px)
10 September 2016	Gold	10K run	Birell Prague Grand Prix	Prague	Czech Republic	[[]] (25x17px)	[[]] (25x17px)
17 September 2016	Gold	Marathon	Beijing Marathon	Beijing	China	[[]] (25x17px)	[[]] (25x17px)
17 September 2016	Gold	Half marathon	Mattoni Usti nad Labem Half Marathon	Ústí nad Labem	Czech Republic	[[]] (25x17px)	[[]] (25x17px)
18 September 2016	Silver	Marathon	Sanlam Cape Town Marathon	Cape Town	South Africa	[[]] (25x17px)	[[]] (25x17px)
18 September 2016	Silver	Half marathon	Copenhagen Half Marathon	Copenhagen	Denmark	[[]] (25x17px)	[[]] (25x17px)
18 September 2016	Silver	10 miles	Dam Tot Damloop	Amsterdam	Netherlands	[[]] (25x17px)	[[]] (25x17px)
18 September 2016	Gold	Marathon	Blackmores Sydney Marathon	Sydney	Australia	[[]] (25x17px)	[[]] (25x17px)
25 September 2016	Bronze	Marathon	38. PZU Maraton Warszawski	Warsaw	Poland	[[]] (25x17px)	[[]] (25x17px)
25 September 2016	Gold	Marathon	BMW Berlin Marathon	Berlin	Germany	[[]] (25x17px)	[[]] (25x17px)
2 October 2016	Gold	Marathon	RNR Lisbon Marathon EDP	Lisbon	Portugal	[[]] (25x17px)	[[]] (25x17px)
2 October 2016	Gold	Half marathon	RNR Half Marathon Vodafone RTP	Lisbon	Portugal	[[]] (25x17px)	[[]] (25x17px)
2 October 2016	Bronze	Marathon	Kosice Peace Marathon	Košice	Slovakia	[[]] (25x17px)	[[]] (25x17px)
2 October 2016	Bronze	Marathon	Bournemouth Marathon	Bournemouth	United Kingdom	[[]] (25x17px)	[[]] (25x17px)
2 October 2016	Bronze	Half marathon	Cardiff University / Cardiff Half Marathon	Cardiff	United Kingdom	[[]] (25x17px)	[[]] (25x17px)
9 October 2016	Gold	Marathon	Bank of America Chicago Marathon	Chicago	United States	[[]] (25x17px)	[[]] (25x17px)
16 October 2016	Gold	Marathon	TCS Amsterdam Marathon	Amsterdam	Netherlands	[[]] (25x17px)	[[]] (25x17px)
16 October 2016	Gold	Marathon	Scotiabank Toronto Waterfront Marathon	Toronto	Canada	[[]] (25x17px)	[[]] (25x17px)
23 October 2016	Bronze	Marathon	Venice Marathon	Venice	Italy	[[]] (25x17px)	[[]] (25x17px)
23 October 2016	Gold	Half marathon	Medio Maraton Valencia Trinidad Alfonso	Valencia	Spain	[[]] (25x17px)	[[]] (25x17px)
30 October 2016	Gold	Marathon	Mainova Frankfurt Marathon	Frankfurt	Germany	[[]] (25x17px)	[[]] (25x17px)
30 October 2016	Silver	20K run	Marseille-Cassis 20km	Marseille	France	[[]] (25x17px)	[[]] (25x17px)
30 October 2016	Gold	Marathon	Shanghai International Marathon	Shanghai	China	[[]] (25x17px)	[[]] (25x17px)
6 November 2016	Gold	Marathon	TCS New York Marathon	New York City	United States	[[]] (25x17px)	[[]] (25x17px)
13 November 2016	Bronze	Marathon	Marathon des Alpes-Maritimes Nice-Cannes	Nice	France	[[]] (25x17px)	[[]] (25x17px)
13 November 2016	Silver	Marathon	BLOM BANK Beirut Marathon	Beirut	Lebanon	[[]] (25x17px)	[[]] (25x17px)
13 November 2016	Gold	Marathon	Vodafone Istanbul Marathon	Istanbul	Turkey	[[]] (25x17px)	[[]] (25x17px)
13 November 2016	Silver	Marathon	Saitama International Marathon	Saitama	Japan	[[]] (25x17px)	[[]] (25x17px)
20 November 2016	Bronze	Half marathon	Semi-Marathon de Boulogne Billancourt Christian Granger	Boulogne-Billancourt	France	[[]] (25x17px)	[[]] (25x17px)
20 November 2016	Gold	Marathon	Maraton Valencia Trinidad Alfonso	Valencia	Spain	[[]] (25x17px)	[[]] (25x17px)
20 November 2016	Bronze	Half marathon	Airtel Delhi Half Marathon	New Delhi	India	[[]] (25x17px)	[[]] (25x17px)
4 December 2016	Gold	Marathon	The 70th Fukuoka International Open Marathon Championships	Fukuoka	Japan	[[]] (25x17px)	[[]] (25x17px)
4 December 2016	Gold	Marathon	Standard Chartered Marathon Singapore	Singapore	Singapore	[[]] (25x17px)	[[]] (25x17px)
11 December 2016	Bronze	Marathon	Guangzhou Marathon	Guangzhou	China	[[]] (25x17px)	[[]] (25x17px)
18 December 2016	Silver	10K run	Corrida Internationale de Houilles	Houilles	France	[[]] (25x17px)	[[]] (25x17px)
31 December 2016	Silver	10K run	52a San Silvestre Vallecana Internacional	Madrid	Spain	[[]] (25x17px)	[[]] (25x17px)
