= 2010 IAAF Road Race Label Events =

Road running competition series

The 2010 IAAF Road Race Label Events were the third edition of the global series of road running competitions given Label status by the International Association of Athletics Federations (IAAF). All five World Marathon Majors had Gold Label status. The series included a total of 57 road races: 24 Gold, 24 Silver and 9 Bronze. In terms of distance, 35 races were marathons, 10 were half marathons, 9 were 10K runs, and 3 were held over other distances.

== Races ==
- World Marathon Majors

Date	Label	Distance	Competition	Venue	Country	Men's winner	Women's winner
2 January 2010	Gold	Marathon	Xiamen International Marathon	Xiamen	China	[[]] (25x17px)	[[]] (25x17px)
17 January 2010	Gold	Marathon	Standard Chartered Mumbai Marathon	Mumbai	India	[[]] (25x17px)	[[]] (25x17px)
31 January 2010	Silver	Marathon	Osaka Women's Marathon	Osaka	Japan	[[]] (25x17px)	[[]] (25x17px)
7 February 2010	Silver	Marathon	59th Beppu-Oita Mainichi Marathon	Ōita	Japan	[[]] (25x17px)	[[]] (25x17px)
7 February 2010	Silver	Half marathon	Kagawa Marugame Half Marathon	Marugame	Japan	[[]] (25x17px)	[[]] (25x17px)
19 February 2010	Silver	Half marathon	RAK Half Marathon	Ras Al Khaimah	United Arab Emirates	[[]] (25x17px)	[[]] (25x17px)
28 February 2010	Gold	10K run	World's Best 10k Race	San Juan	Puerto Rico	[[]] (25x17px)	[[]] (25x17px)
28 February 2010	Gold	Marathon	Tokyo Marathon	Tokyo	Japan	[[]] (25x17px)	[[]] (25x17px)
7 March 2010	Bronze	Half marathon	Semi-Marathon Intl de Paris	Paris	France	[[]] (25x17px)	[[]] (25x17px)
7 March 2010	Gold	Marathon	Lake Biwa Mainichi Marathon	Ōtsu	Japan	[[]] (25x17px)	[[]] (25x17px)
14 March 2010	Silver	Marathon	Nagoya Intl Women's Marathon	Nagoya	Japan	[[]] (25x17px)	[[]] (25x17px)
21 March 2010	Gold	Marathon	Seoul International Marathon	Seoul	South Korea	[[]] (25x17px)	[[]] (25x17px)
21 March 2010	Gold	Half marathon	EDP Half Marathon of Lisbon	Lisbon	Portugal	[[]] (25x17px)	[[]] (25x17px)
21 March 2010	Silver	Marathon	Maratona di Rome	Rome	Italy	[[]] (25x17px)	[[]] (25x17px)
27 March 2010	Gold	Half marathon	Hervis Prague Half Marathon	Prague	Czech Republic	[[]] (25x17px)	[[]] (25x17px)
11 April 2010	Gold	Marathon	Marathon International de Paris	Paris	France	[[]] (25x17px)	[[]] (25x17px)
11 April 2010	Bronze	Marathon	Mangyongdae Prize Marathon	Pyongyang	North Korea	[[]] (25x17px)	[[]] (25x17px)
18 April 2010	Bronze	Marathon	Nagano Olympic Commemorative Marathon	Nagano	Japan	[[]] (25x17px)	[[]] (25x17px)
18 April 2010	Bronze	10K run	Cursa Bombers de Barcelona	Barcelona	Spain	[[]] (25x17px)	[[]] (25x17px)
18 April 2010	Bronze	10K run	Great Ireland Run	Dublin	Ireland	[[]] (25x17px)	[[]] (25x17px)
18 April 2010	Bronze	Marathon	Intl. Marathon Alexander the Great	Thessaloniki	Greece	[[]] (25x17px)	[[]] (25x17px)
19 April 2010	Gold	Marathon	B.A.A. Boston Marathon	Boston	United States	[[]] (25x17px)	[[]] (25x17px)
25 April 2010	Gold	Marathon	Virgin London Marathon	London	United Kingdom	[[]] (25x17px)	[[]] (25x17px)
25 April 2010	Silver	Marathon	Madrid Marathon	Madrid	Spain	[[]] (25x17px)	[[]] (25x17px)
9 May 2010	Silver	Marathon	Volkswagen Prague Marathon	Prague	Czech Republic	[[]] (25x17px)	[[]] (25x17px)
16 May 2010	Gold	10K run	BUPA Great Manchester Run	Manchester	United Kingdom	[[]] (25x17px)	[[]] (25x17px)
16 May 2010	Bronze	Marathon	Salzburg AMREF Marathon	Salzburg	Austria	[[]] (25x17px)	[[]] (25x17px)
23 May 2010	Gold	10K run	Sunfeast World 10K Bangalore	Bangalore	India	[[]] (25x17px)	[[]] (25x17px)
29 May 2010	Silver	10K run	Ottawa 10K Road Race	Ottawa	Canada	[[]] (25x17px)	[[]] (25x17px)
30 May 2010	Silver	Marathon	Ottawa Marathon	Ottawa	Canada	[[]] (25x17px)	[[]] (25x17px)
5 June 2010	Silver	5K run	Freihofer's 5 Km Run for Women	Albany	United States	[[]] (25x17px)	[[]] (25x17px)
26 June 2010	Bronze	10K run	Corrida de Langueux	Langueux	France	[[]] (25x17px)	[[]] (25x17px)
1 August 2010	Gold	Half marathon	Bogota Intl. Half Marathon	Bogotá	Colombia	[[]] (25x17px)	[[]] (25x17px)
11 September 2010	Silver	10K run	Metro 10km	Prague	Czech Republic	[[]] (25x17px)	[[]] (25x17px)
19 September 2010	Gold	Half marathon	BUPA Great North Run	Newcastle upon Tyne	United Kingdom	[[]] (25x17px)	[[]] (25x17px)
26 September 2010	Gold	Marathon	real,- Berlin-Marathon	Berlin	Germany	[[]] (25x17px)	[[]] (25x17px)
26 September 2010	Gold	Half marathon	Vodafone Half Marathon of Portugal	Lisbon	Portugal	[[]] (25x17px)	[[]] (25x17px)
26 September 2010	Silver	Marathon	Scotiabank Toronto Waterfront Marathon	Toronto	Canada	[[]] (25x17px)	[[]] (25x17px)
10 October 2010	Gold	Marathon	Bank of America Chicago Marathon	Chicago	United States	[[]] (25x17px)	[[]] (25x17px)
17 October 2010	Silver	Marathon	Amsterdam Marathon	Amsterdam	Netherlands	[[]] (25x17px)	[[]] (25x17px)
17 October 2010	Silver	Marathon	Intercontinental Istanbul Eurasia Marathon	Istanbul	Turkey	[[]] (25x17px)	[[]] (25x17px)
17 October 2010	Silver	Marathon	Gyeongju International Marathon	Gyeongju	South Korea	[[]] (25x17px)	[[]] (25x17px)
24 October 2010	Gold	Marathon	Beijing International Marathon	Beijing	China	[[]] (25x17px)	[[]] (25x17px)
24 October 2010	Gold	10 miles	BUPA Great South Run	Portsmouth	United Kingdom	[[]] (25x17px)	[[]] (25x17px)
24 October 2010	Silver	Marathon	Venice Marathon	Venice	Italy	[[]] (25x17px)	[[]] (25x17px)
24 October 2010	Silver	Marathon	Chosunilbo Chuncheon Intl. Marathon Men	Chuncheon	South Korea	[[]] (25x17px)	[[]] (25x17px)
31 October 2010	Silver	Half Marathon	Marseille Cassis Classique Int.le	Marseille	France	[[]] (25x17px)	[[]] (25x17px)
31 October 2010	Gold	Marathon	Commerzbank Frankfurt Marathon	Frankfurt	Germany	[[]] (25x17px)	[[]] (25x17px)
31 October 2010	Gold	Marathon	Athens Classic Marathon	Athens	Greece	[[]] (25x17px)	[[]] (25x17px)
7 November 2010	Gold	Marathon	ING New York City Marathon	New York City	United States	[[]] (25x17px)	[[]] (25x17px)
7 November 2010	Bronze	Marathon	Joongang Seoul Marathon	Seoul	South Korea	[[]] (25x17px)	[[]] (25x17px)
14 November 2010	Silver	Marathon	Turin Marathon	Turin	Italy	[[]] (25x17px)	[[]] (25x17px)
21 November 2010	Gold	Half marathon	Airtel Delhi Half Marathon	Delhi	India	[[]] (25x17px)	[[]] (25x17px)
21 November 2010	Silver	15K run	ABN AMRO Zevenheuvelenloop	Nijmegen	Netherlands	[[]] (25x17px)	[[]] (25x17px)
5 December 2010	Silver	Marathon	64th Fukuoka Intl. Open Marathon	Fukuoka	Japan	[[]] (25x17px)	[[]] (25x17px)
5 December 2010	Silver	Marathon	Standard Chartered Marathon Singapore	Singapore	Singapore	[[]] (25x17px)	[[]] (25x17px)
31 December 2010	Silver	10K run	San Silvestre Vallecana	Madrid	Spain	[[]] (25x17px)	[[]] (25x17px)
