= Franklin Chepkwony =

Kenyan long-distance runner

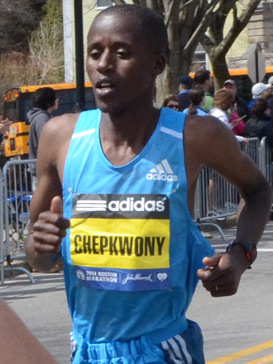
Franklin Chepkwony, 3rd-place winner in 2014 Boston Marathon shown here near halfway point in Wellesley

Franklin Chepkwony (15 June 1984 – 8 August 2023), sometimes spelled Frankline, was a Kenyan professional long-distance runner. He had a marathon personal best time of 2:06:11 hours.

Chepkwony's first marathon run came at the 2011 Nairobi Marathon, where he placed second in a time of two hours and eleven minutes. He made his international marathon debut at the 2012 Zurich Marathon, winning with a time of 2:10:57. Later that year, Chepkwony set a personal best of 2:06:11 when finishing second at the Eindhoven Marathon in October, 25 seconds behind compatriot Dickson Chumba. This time ranked him 26th in the world over the distance for that year.

In 2013, Chepkwony won the Seoul International Marathon in 2:06:59, taking home $80,000 for winning the race under 2:10:00. He ran his second marathon in the Netherlands in October, but did not perform as well as he had in Eindhoven, coming seventh in the Amsterdam Marathon in a time of 2:09:53 hours. In November he won the Boulogne-Billancourt Half Marathon in France, setting a course record of 1:00:11.

He opened the following season at the Santa Pola Half Marathon, coming second. In April, Chepkwony finished third in the 2014 Boston Marathon, his first top finish in the World Marathon Majors, behind American Meb Keflezighi and Kenyan Wilson Chebet.

Chepkwony was a training partner of Dennis Kimetto and Geoffrey Mutai.

== Personal bests ==
- Half marathon – 1:00:11 hours (2013)
- Marathon – 2:06:11 hours (2012)
