= Marathon du Gabon =

Annual race in Gabon since 2013

- Date: December
- Location: Libreville, Estuaire, Gabon
- Event type: Road
- Distance: Marathon, half marathon, 10K, 5K
- Established: 2013 (13 years ago)
- Website: https://www.rungabon.com/marathon-gabon

The Marathon du Gabon (also known as the Marathon du Gabon Arise for sponsorship reasons) is an annual road-based marathon hosted by Libreville, Gabon, since 2013. The marathon is a World Athletics Label Road Race. During the race weekend, a half marathon, a 10K race, and a 5K race are also offered.
