= Yolanda Fernández de Cofiño =

Guatemalan entrepreneur and philanthropist (1934–2021)

- Born: 29 July 1934; Santiago de Chile, Chile
- Died: 6 September 2021 (aged 87); Guatemala City, Guatemala
- Occupation: Businesswoman
- Known for: Introducing the precursor of the "Happy Meal"; Establishing the Ronald McDonald Foundation in Guatemala
- Spouse: José María Cofiño Valladares
- Children: 5

Yolanda Fernández de Cofiño (29 July 1934 – 6 September 2021), also referred to as Doña Yoly, was a Chilean-Guatemalan businesswoman and philanthropist. She managed the McDonald's franchise in Guatemala from its start in 1974 and is recognized for having introduced a concept for a small children's menu to the company that would lead to the creation of the "Happy Meal".

== Early life ==
Fernández de Cofiño was born in Santiago de Chile, where she lived until she was 20 years old. In 1956 her father was appointed Chilean ambassador for Guatemala, so she relocated to Guatemala with the rest of her family. In Guatemala she met and later married José María Cofiño Valladares; they had five children together.

== Business activities ==
In 1974, Fernández and her husband purchased the first McDonald's franchise for Guatemala. Fernández de Cofiño was involved in the business from the beginning. She focused on marketing the franchise as a family restaurant. To be better prepared, she attended Hamburger University in Oak Brook, Illinois and participated in seminars and conventions. While working in the restaurant, she noticed that the menu portions offered were too large for children. This led her to introduce the "Ronald Menu", which included a small hamburger, a small portion French fries and an ice cream, in addition to a toy. The idea was noticed by executives at the McDonald's corporate offices in the US, who advised her to present the menu in the World Franchisee Convention in 1977. McDonald's adopted the idea and implemented it worldwide in 1979, renaming it to "Happy Meal". Fernández de Cofiño received a "Ronald Award" from the corporation.

Another innovation that was implemented by Fernández de Cofiño locally and then adopted by McDonald's internationally was the concept of birthday celebrations in the restaurants. She was granted a second "Ronald Award" for this idea.

After her husband died, Fernández de Cofiño continued managing the restaurant chain; in 2006 she acquired the franchises for El Salvador, Honduras, and Nicaragua, establishing "McDonald's Mesoamérica". In 2018 she left the franchise management to her children, although she continued participating occasionally.

== Philanthropic activities ==
Fernández de Cofiño established the Ronald McDonald Foundation in Guatemala. This foundation supports children with severe malnutrition and other illnesses. The first McHappy Day in Guatemala was held in 1999; in this day, all the profit from Big Mac sales is destined for the foundation. The first Ronald McDonald House, which provides lodging for low-income families traveling to Guatemala City for medical treatment, was opened in 2005. Currently there are three Ronald McDonald Houses in Guatemala, all located close to the main public hospitals in the city.

== Death ==
Fernández de Cofiño died in Guatemala City on 6 September 2021.

== Awards ==
These are some of the awards granted to Fernández de Cofiño for her business and social work:

- Two "Ronald Awards", granted by McDonald's in 1980 for the idea of holding birthday celebrations in restaurants, and in 1982 for the creation of the "Ronald Menu".
- She received the "Golden Arches" award, which is the highest award granted by McDonald's Corporation to its franchisees.
- Recognized as one of "The 12 Most Important Guatemalans of 2001" by the Managers' Association of Guatemala, due to her social work.
- In 2002 she received "The Leading Women Entrepreneurs of the World" award in Paris, France; this award is granted to 40 businesswomen from all around the world who stand out due to their social work.
- In 2006 she received the "Illustrious Guatemalan" award in the Business category.
- In 2014 she was honored by Guatemala's Chamber of Industry due to her work as an entrepreneur.
- In 2018 she received the Recognition of Business Excellence from Forbes for her business career.
