= Samuel Muturi Mugo =

Kenyan long-distance runner

Samuel Muturi Mugo (born 2 May 1986) is a Kenyan athlete who specialises in long distance running, particularly the marathon. He also competes under the name Sammy Mugo.

Mugo moved to Japan to become a professional athlete and began participating in senior competitions in 2003. He started out as a 5000 and 10,000 metres track runner and finished in the top three in the Shizuoka International 10,000 m from 2003 to 2005, improving his best time every year. He began competing in longer road races from 2005 onwards, breaking into the top ten at the 2005 Sapporo Half Marathon, and running as part of the winning Konica Minolta team at the All-Japan Corporate Team Ekiden Championships. The following year he took sixth place at the Sapporo race and set a personal best at the Marugame Half Marathon. He made his marathon debut at the Hamburg Marathon and, although strong in the first half of the race, he faded away in the latter stages and finished in twelfth place. He improved at the Cologne Marathon and recorded a best of 2:11:27 to take second place behind Daniel Kirwa Too.

He focused on just marathoning in 2008: he recorded a personal best at the Tiberias Marathon and was rewarded with his first ever win at the Porto Marathon in another personal record. He built upon this in 2009 by winning the Xiamen International Marathon in a course record time, taking second place in the Rock 'n' Roll San Diego Marathon, and recording a new best of 2:08:20 to win the Beijing Marathon. The next marathon he entered was the Boston Marathon in 2010, but he failed to finish as bronchial trouble forced him out of the race at the 25 km mark. Poor weather affected his attempt to defend his Beijing title and he finished sixth in one of the slowest races of the course's history. He returned again the following year and in spite of a slow start, he pulled back into second place and clocked a time of 2:09:43 hours behind Francis Kiprop.

== Personal bests ==
Surface	Event	Time (h:m:s)	Venue	Date
Track	5000 m	13:24.92	Nobeoka, Japan	27 May 2006
Track	10,000 m	27:35.55	Kobe, Japan	24 April 2005
Road	15 km	43:56	Sapporo, Japan	9 July 2006
Road	20 km	59:08	Marugame, Japan	5 February 2006
Road	Half marathon	1:02:06	Azpeitia, Spain	28 March 2009
Road	Marathon	2:08:20	Beijing, China	18 October 2009

- All information taken from IAAF profile.
