= Bogotá Women's Race =

- Date: September
- Location: Bogotá, Colombia
- Event type: Road (female only)
- Distance: 10 km, 8 km, 4 km, 2 km
- Established: 2007
- Website: Carrera de la Mujer Bogotá

The Bogotá Women's Race (Spanish: Carrera de la Mujer) is a road running event exclusively for women held in Bogotá, Colombia, each year. It was established in 2007, when 6,000 women took part, and participation has risen to 17,000 in the 2013 event. A range of distances is available, from 12 kilometres (7.5 miles) for elite athletes, down to 2 kilometres (1.2 miles) for mothers with prams.

The event takes place in the Simón Bolívar Park, with most of the races using a 4 km loop. The elite athletes run three laps of the course, while the open race, for runners over 18, comprises two laps. There are a variety of classes who run just one lap: women aged between 40 and 49, those over the age of 50, girls between 12 and 14, and girls between 15 and 17. According to the organisers, the races promote "a better quality of life for women with an emphasis on physical activity as the starting point."

For the first two years, the elite runners competed over 10 kilometres (6.2 miles), and on both occasions the race was won by Colombian runner Yolanda Fernández de Cofiño. In 2009, the race was extended to 12 kilometres (7.5 miles), and was once again won by Fernández. The following year, another Colombian runner, Yolanda Caballero, won the race, but between 2011 and 2015, the race was won by African athletes. Ethiopian Belainesh Gebre won in 2011, setting a course record of 40:46, while two Kenyan runners won in 2012 and 2013, Veronica Nyaruai followed by Sylvia Kibet. The IAAF describe the altitude of the race, 2,625 metres (8,612 ft), as being "energy-draining", an assessment backed up by the 2013 winner Kibet.

In 2023, the 21 kilometres (13 miles) race was won by Angie Orjuela.

== Results ==
Year	Athlete	Nationality	Time (m:s)	Notes	Ref
2019	Angie Orjuela	Colombia	36:25		
2018	Leidy Romero	Colombia	36:41		
2017	Angie Orjuela	Colombia	35:32		
2016	Angie Orjuela	Colombia	36:32		
2015	Belaynesh Oljira	Ethiopia	33:57		
2014	Belaynesh Oljira	Ethiopia	33:52		
2013	Sylvia Kibet	Kenya	42:11	12 km course	
2012	Veronica Nyaruai	Kenya	41:06	12 km course	
2011	Belainesh Gebre	Ethiopia	40:46	12 km course	
2010	Yolanda Caballero	Colombia	42:43	12 km course	
2009	Yolanda Fernández de Cofiño	Colombia	42:36	12 km course	
2008	Yolanda Fernández de Cofiño	Colombia	36:00		
2007	Yolanda Fernández de Cofiño	Colombia	32:16		
