= Boulogne-Billancourt Half Marathon =

Road running event in Boulogne-Billancourt, France

- Date: November
- Location: Boulogne-Billancourt, France
- Event type: Road
- Distance: Half marathon
- Primary sponsor: New Balance
- Established: 1997
- Course records: Men: 1:00:11 (2013) (Kenya) Franklin Chepkwony; Women: 1:08:24 (2019) (Kenya) Nancy Jelagat
- Website: Boulogne-Billancourt Half Marathon
- Participants: 8,108 (2019); 7,873 (2018)

The Boulogne-Billancourt Half Marathon (French: Semi-marathon de Boulogne-Billancourt) is an annual road running event over the half marathon distance which takes place in November in Boulogne-Billancourt, France.

The event was first organised in 1997 by the Athletic Club de Boulogne-Billancourt. The race steadily increased in size in its first years, attaining 1000 entrants by 2000 and doubling this number three years later. The Fédération française d'athlétisme classed it as a national level race in 2006 and following the participation of 4000 runners from 26 countries, it was raised to international race status the following year.

At the 2008 edition, Kenyan Nicholas Manza ran a race record time of 1:00:12 hours. A year later, Ethiopia's Firehiwot Dado became the first woman to complete the distance in under one hour and ten minutes, setting the women's course record of 1:09:26 hours. The 2011 race was the first run with IAAF Bronze Label Road Race status, marking it as one of the foremost races of its kind.

The course for the race is a looped circuit that starts and finishes at the town hall. It follows a clockwise route along the river Seine, passing the Sèvres - Cité de la céramique, Pont de Saint-Cloud. It heads north towards the Longchamp Racecourse and has a short loop through the Bois de Boulogne, where it reaches the halfway mark. At this point the course loops back on itself and follows the Seine in a southerly direction until it finally ends up at the town hall finish point.

== Past winners ==
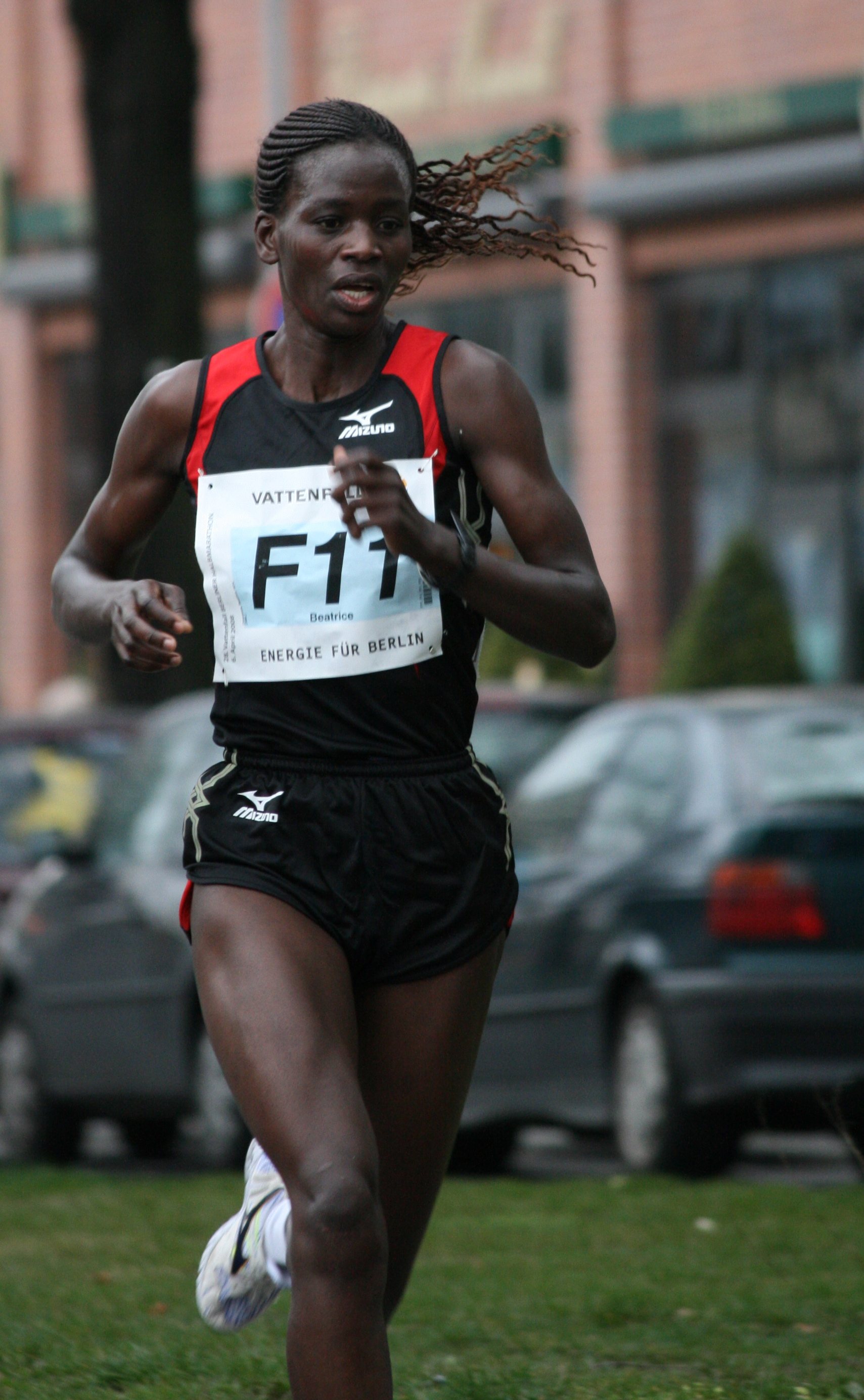
The 2001 women's champion Beatrice Omwanza went on to win the Paris Marathon in 2003.

Key: Course record

Edition	Year	Men's winner	Time (h:m:s)	Women's winner	Time (h:m:s)
1st	1997	José Azede (FRA)	1:08:00	Éva Petrik (HUN)	1:19:41
2nd	1998	Sami M'Tougi (FRA)	1:07:38	Zoya Kaznovska (UKR)	1:21:03
3rd	1999	David Maina (KEN)	1:04:25	Faustine Keitany (KEN)	1:15:45
4th	2000	Wilson Onsare (KEN)	1:04:55	Olga Mitchourina (RUS)	1:15:15
5th	2001	Julius Maritim (KEN)	1:02:42	Beatrice Omwanza (KEN)	1:13:29
6th	2002	Isaac Macharia (KEN)	1:02:46	Magdaline Chemjor (KEN)	1:12:53
7th	2003	Luke Metto (KEN)	1:02:22	Elizabeth Mongudhi (NAM)	1:16:47
8th	2004	Duncan Kibet (KEN)	1:01:51	Sally Kimaiyo (KEN)	1:14:16
9th	2005	David Langat (KEN)	1:00:47	Meriem Wangari (KEN)	1:12:00
10th	2006	Jackson Matelong (KEN)	1:04:25	Eunice Orwaru (KEN)	1:15:18
11th	2007	Gideon Mitei (KEN)	1:02:37	Lydia Njeri (KEN)	1:13:27
12th	2008	Nicholas Kamakya (KEN)	1:00:12	Emily Rotich (KEN)	1:10:53
13th	2009	Samson Kiflemariam (ERI)	1:02:50	Firehiwot Dado (ETH)	1:09:26
14th	2010	Samsom Gebreyohannes (ERI)	1:03:01	Sarah Chepchirchir (KEN)	1:11:01
15th	2011	Sentayehu Ejigu (ETH)	1:01:38	Goitetom Haftu (ETH)	1:10:57
16th	2012	Tesfaalem Gebrearegawi (ETH)	1:01:07	Tigist Kiros (ETH)	1:11:11
17th	2013	Franklin Chepkwony (KEN)	1:00:11	Sarah Chepchirchir (KEN)	1:10:33
18th	2014	Yitayal Atnafu (ETH)	1:01:03	Bekelech Daba (ETH)	1:11:10
	2015	Cancelled due to November 2015 Paris attacks			
19th	2016	Morris Gachaga (KEN)	1:02:04	Gebeyanesh Ayele (ETH)	1:10:21
20th	2017	Hiskel Tewelde (ERI)	1:01:13	Rahma Tusa (ETH)	1:08:29
21st	2018	Taye Girma (ETH)	1:00:55	Parendis Lekapana (KEN)	1:10:48
22nd	2019	Felix Kipkoech (KEN)	1:00:12	Nancy Jelagat (KEN)	1:08:24
