= Great Manchester Run =

Mass sport event in England

- Date: May (2023)
- Location: Greater Manchester
- Event type: Road
- Distance: 10K
- Established: 2003
- Website: Great Manchester Run

The Great Manchester Run is an annual run through Greater Manchester (namely Manchester, Trafford and Salford). It has consisted of a 10k run since it was established in 2003, and a half marathon since 2017. The 10k race is the largest of its type in Europe. Usually held in mid-May, it is the third-largest mass participation running event in the United Kingdom, behind the Great North Run and the London Marathon. It is part of the Great Run series of road races in the UK. It was formerly sponsored by Bupa (2003–2014) and Morrisons (2015).

== Course ==
The 10k course starts and finishes in Manchester city centre. It starts on Portland Street and heads southwest, out of the city centre and down the Chester Road. After entering Trafford it leaves this road and passes Old Trafford stadium. The course loops around Trafford Park, passing the Coronation Street set and the Imperial War Museum North. It then returns to Manchester city centre along the Chester Road, finishing by the Beetham Tower in Deansgate.

The half marathon course consists of the 10k course with a 7-mile detour. The detour begins after nearly a mile, when it turns east onto the Mancunian Way. It heads down the length of the motorway section and continues for another mile along the Old Ashton Road. It then turns north and heads to the Etihad Stadium, before turning back and heading back to the point where the detour began. It then continues along the remainder of the 10k course.

== 2007–08 ==
The 2007 race had an estimated 28,000 participants. Briton Jo Pavey won the women's event while Kenyan Micah Kogo won the men's, beating the UK all-comers' record by four seconds with a finishing time of 27:25 minutes. Celebrity participants included Kelly Holmes, Amir Khan and members of the cast of Coronation Street.

The following year saw almost 25,000 runners complete the course. Pavey successfully defended her title at the event while Rose Cheruiyot and Bezunesh Bekele took second and third place respectively. Austrian Günther Weidlinger took the title in the men's race. Unusual for a distance dominated by African runners, the top three finishers in the men's race (which also included Ukrainian Serhiy Lebid and Sweden's Mustafa Mohamed) were all European competitors.

== 2009 and Great City Games ==
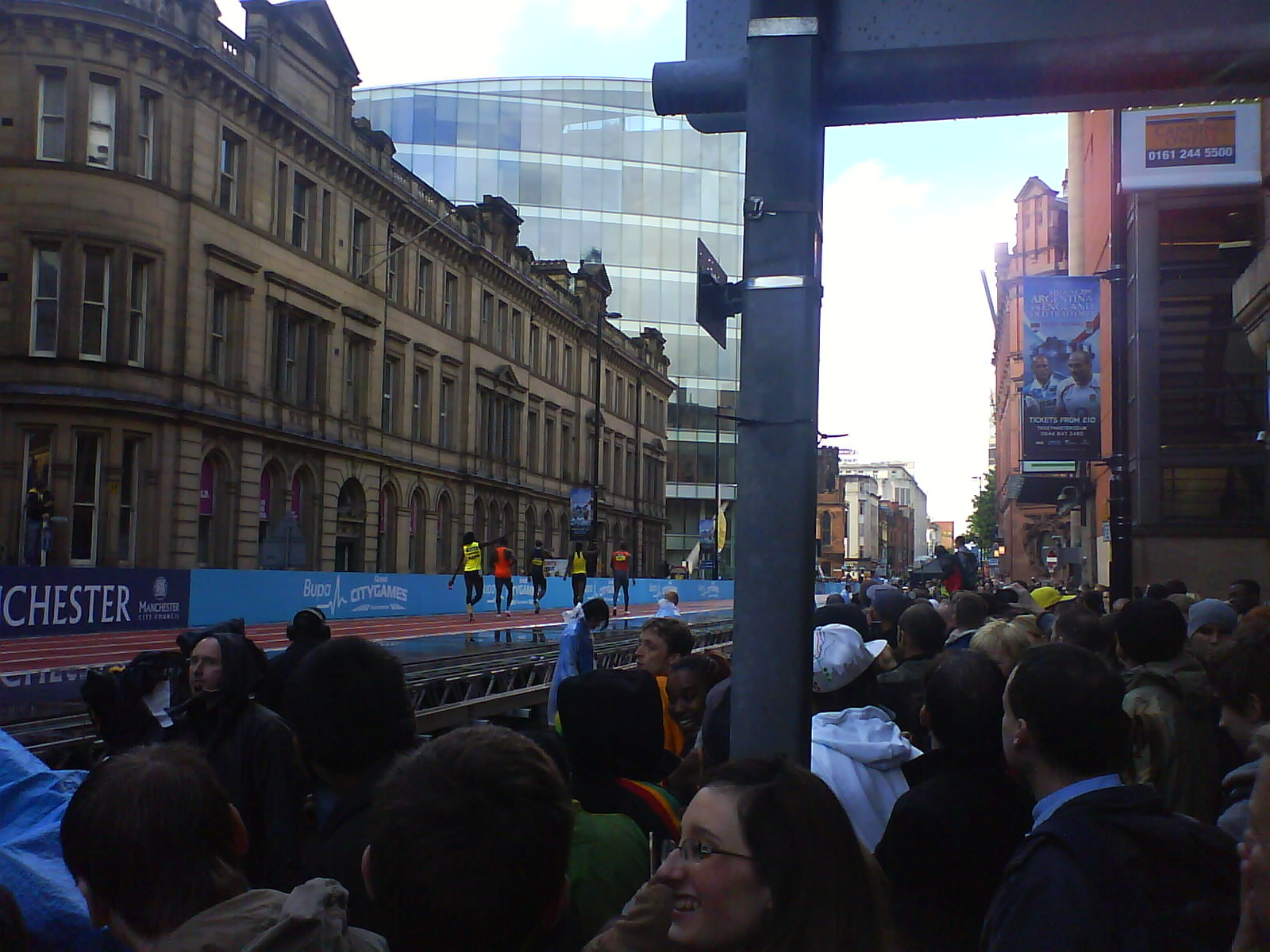
Athletes completing a lap of honour on the 150 metre track after the City Games.

The race was upgraded to IAAF Gold Label Road Race status and the 2009 edition was expanded to include the Great City Games. Around 33,000 runners signed up for the 10 kilometres race and both events were contested on 17 May.

Previous 10 km winner Haile Gebrselassie stated that he wanted to regain his UK All-Comers' record, which was broken by Micah Kogo's event winning run in 2007. Despite a strong first half of the race, Gebrselassie failed to break the record after he was impeded by wet and windy conditions. Vivian Cheruiyot won the women's race in 32:01 minutes but conditions also slowed her time, much to her dissatisfaction. Brian Alldis and Shelly Woods won their respective men's and women's wheelchair races.

The addition of The Great City Games brought much attention to the Great Run event. Comprising a number of 150 metres races to be run on the streets near Manchester's Deansgate, Olympic Champions Usain Bolt and Christine Ohuruogu accepted invitations to compete. Other competitors included Debbie Ferguson-McKenzie, Ivory Williams, British Olympians Marlon Devonish and Donna Fraser, and a number of other British and Jamaican athletes. Bolt suffered minor leg injuries after crashing his car near Kingston, Jamaica, but after cancelling a track meet and resuming training he stated that he would be fit to compete. Bolt completed the distance in a world best time of 14.35 seconds while Ferguson-McKenzie won the women's race in 16.54 seconds.

== Past winners (10K) ==
Key: Course record

Edition	Year	Men's winner	Time (m:s)	Women's winner	Time (m:s)
1st	2003	Paul Tergat (KEN)	28:48	Berhane Adere (ETH)	31:50
2nd	2004	Craig Mottram (AUS)	27:54	Sonia O'Sullivan (IRL)	32:12
3rd	2005	Haile Gebrselassie (ETH)	27:25	Lornah Kiplagat (NED)	31:28
4th	2006	Zersenay Tadese (ERI)	27:36	Berhane Adere (ETH)	31:07
5th	2007	Micah Kogo (KEN)	27:24	Jo Pavey (GBR)	31:41
6th	2008	Günther Weidlinger (AUT)	28:10	Jo Pavey (GBR)	31:58
7th	2009	Haile Gebrselassie (ETH)	27:39	Vivian Cheruiyot (KEN)	32:01
8th	2010	Haile Gebrselassie (ETH)	28:02	Werknesh Kidane (ETH)	31:19
9th	2011	Haile Gebrselassie (ETH)	28:10	Helen Clitheroe (GBR)	31:45
10th	2012	Haile Gebrselassie (ETH)	27:39	Linet Masai (KEN)	31:35
11th	2013	Moses Kipsiro (UGA)	27:52	Tirunesh Dibaba (ETH)	30:49
12th	2014	Kenenisa Bekele (ETH)	28:23	Tirunesh Dibaba (ETH)	31:09
13th	2015	Stephen Sambu (KEN)	27:30	Betsy Saina (KEN)	31:49
14th	2016	Kenenisa Bekele (ETH)	28:08	Tirunesh Dibaba (ETH)	31:16
15th	2017	Dathan Ritzenhein (USA)	28:06	Tirunesh Dibaba (ETH)	31:03
16th	2018	Mo Farah (GBR)	28:27	Tirunesh Dibaba (ETH)	31:08
17th	2019	Jacob Kiplimo (UGA)	27:31	Hellen Obiri (KEN)	31:23
18th	2021	Marc Scott (GBR)	28:03	Eilish McColgan (GBR)	30:52
19th	2022	Jake Robertson (NZL)	28:06	Hellen Obiri (KEN)	30:15
20th	2023	Eyob Faniel (ITA)	28:27	Hellen Obiri (KEN)	31:14
21st	2024	Vincent Ngetich (KEN)	27:25	Gotytom Gebreslase (ETH)	30:32
