= San Silvestre Vallecana =

Annual running race in Madrid, Spain

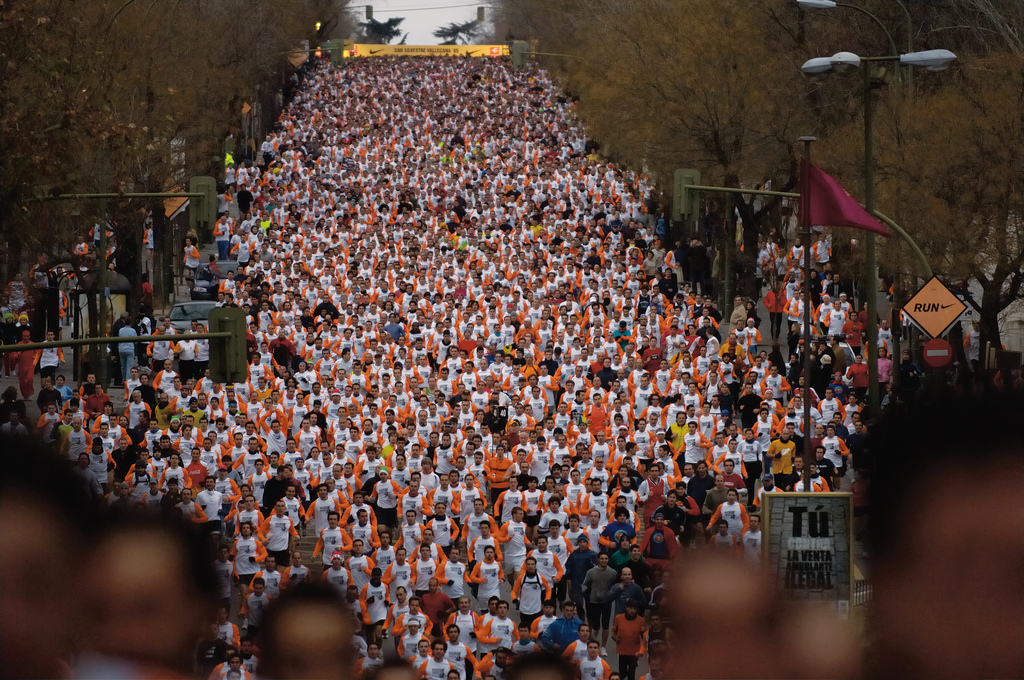
- San Silvestre Vallecana 2005
- Date: 31 December
- Location: Vallecas, Madrid, Spain
- Event type: 10K run
- Distance: 10 km
- Primary sponsor: Nationale Nederlanden
- Established: 1964
- Course records: Men: 26:32 ( (Ethiopia) Berihu Aregawi 2024); 26:32 ( (Uganda) Jacob Kiplimo 2024); Women: 29:54 ( (Kenya) Brigid Kosgei 2018)
- Website: San Silvestre Vallecana
- Participants: 1,052 finishers (2021); 301 finishers (2020, only elite runners); 1,239 (2019); 1,105 (2018)

The San Silvestre Vallecana is an annual 10 km road race held on 31 December in Madrid, Spain since 1964. It has two editions: a fun run for amateur athletes and an elite race for professional athletes. In 2012, the race achieved its historical record of participants, up to 40,000.

It is based upon the Saint Silvester Road Race, a Brazilian race (held since 1925) which spawned numerous other New Year's Eve races. Along with the Madrid Marathon, the San Silvestre Vallecana is one of the city's foremost annual running events.

== San Silvestre Popular ==
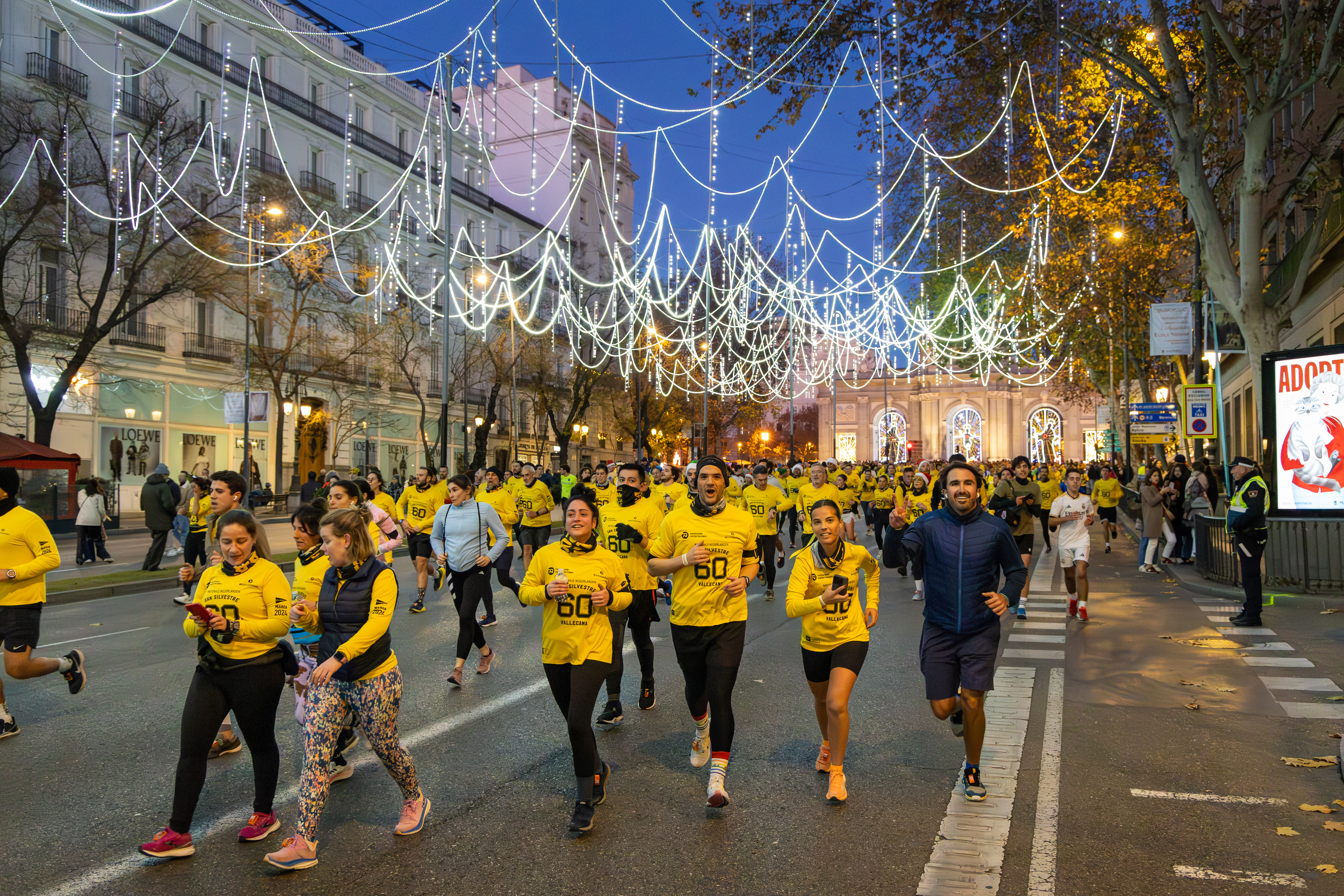
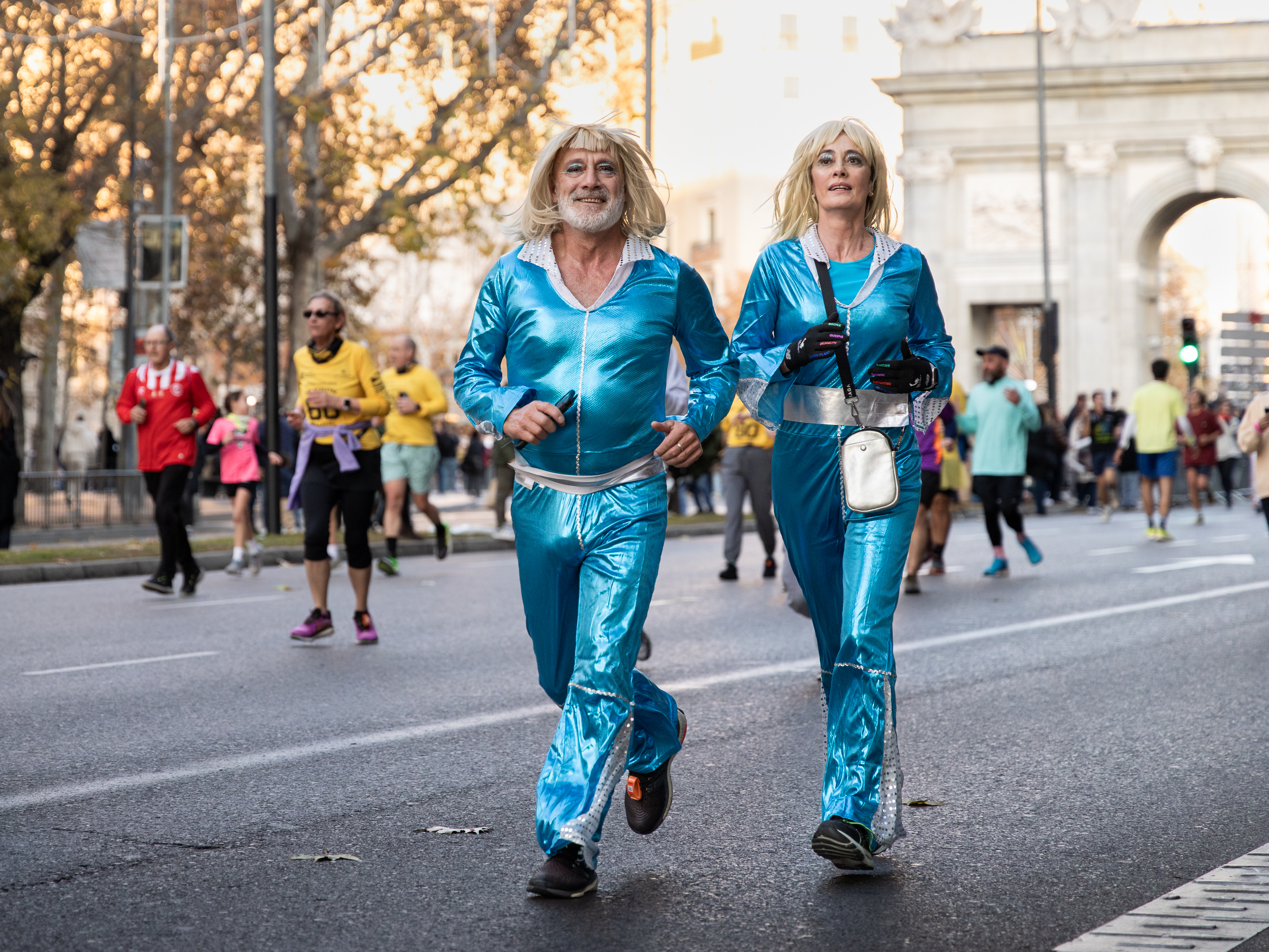
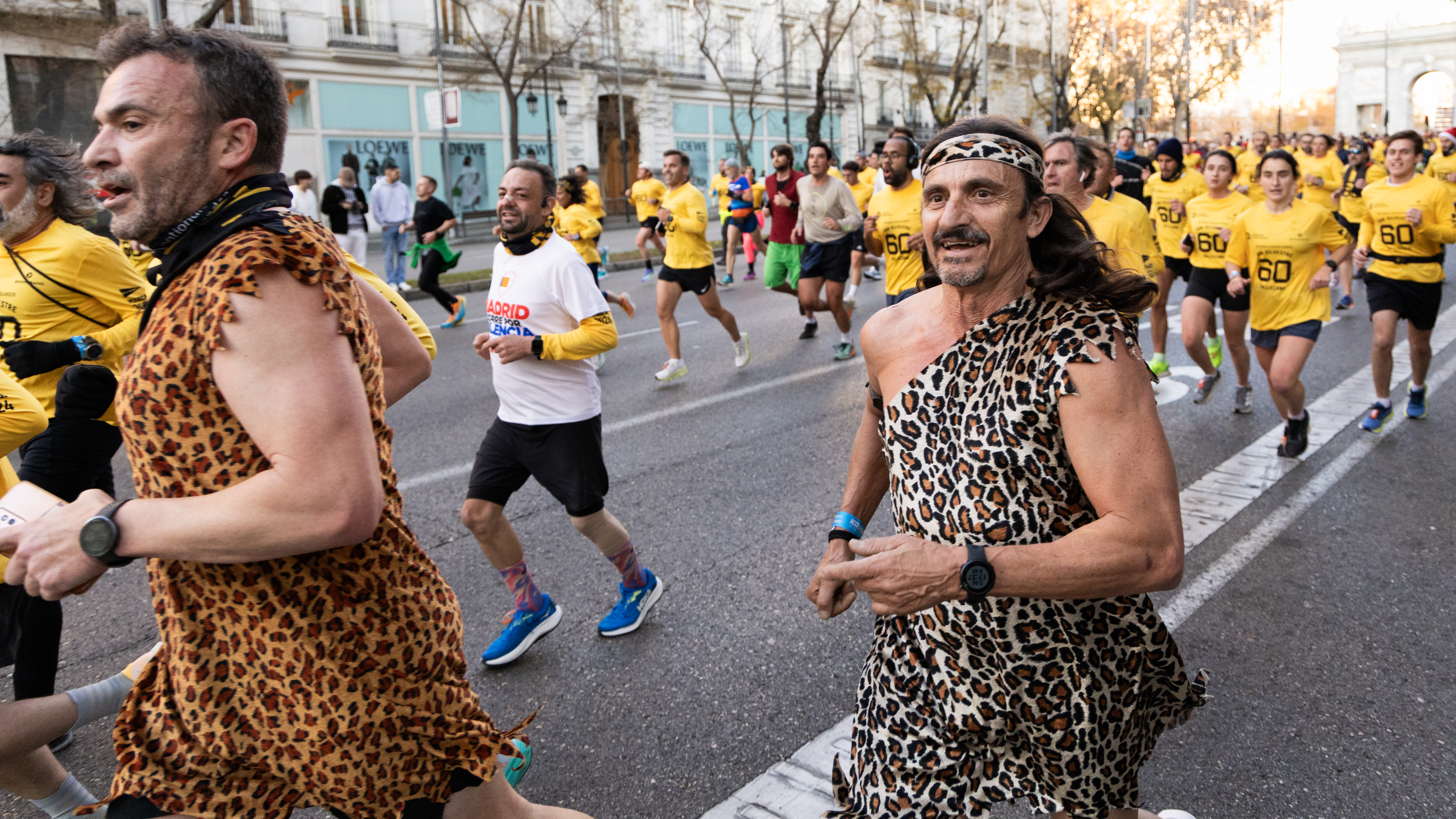
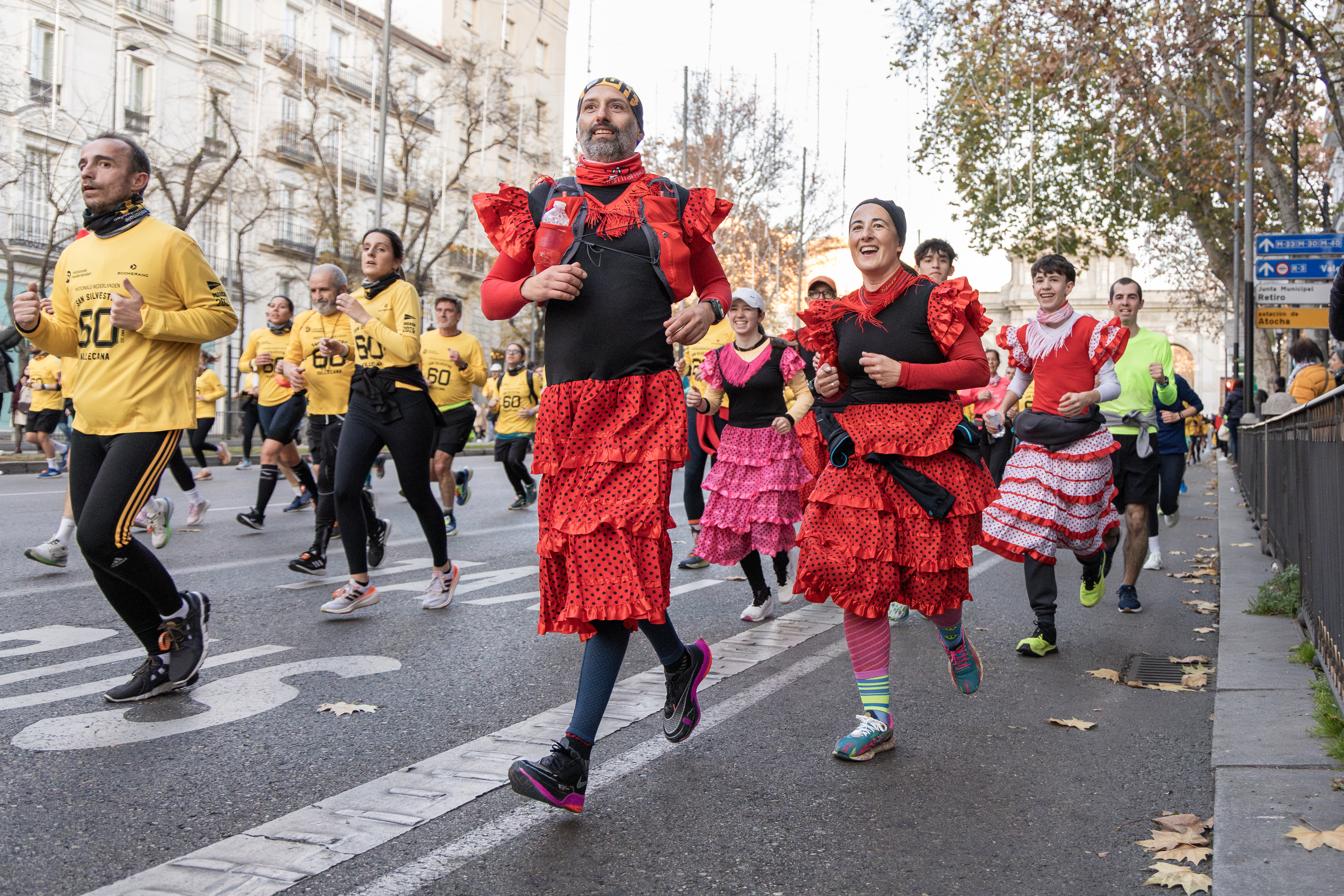
Participants in the 2024 San Silvestre Vallecana Popular running along Alcalá Street past the Puerta de Alcalá, many in festive costumes.

The San Silvestre Popular is a part of the broader San Silvestre Vallecana event that caters to amateur runners of all levels. It provides an opportunity for participants to enjoy a festive 10 km race on New Year's Eve. The race begins at Concha Espina street and concludes in Vallecas Stadium, with the course passing through some of Madrid's most iconic locations. This version of the event emphasizes inclusivity and celebration, attracting thousands of runners who dress up in costumes and share the joy of the year's end.

The San Silvestre Popular is celebrated as a family-friendly event, featuring vibrant music, cheering crowds, and an electric atmosphere. Many participants join for fun rather than competition, creating a stark contrast to the elite race that occurs later the same evening.

== Past winners ==
Course record

=== 10 km (since 1998) ===
Year	Men's winner	Country	Time	Women's winner	Country	Time
1998	Fabián Roncero	Spain	29:13	Patricia Arribas	Spain	
1999	Jon Brown	United Kingdom	28:08	Tereza Yohannes	Ethiopia	32:50
2000	Isaac Viciosa	Spain	28:45	Patricia Arribas	Spain	32:22
2001	Isaac Viciosa	Spain	28:32	María Abel	Spain	32:53
2002	Isaac Viciosa	Spain	28:07	Marta Domínguez	Spain	32:13
2003	José Manuel Martínez	Spain	28:12	Marta Domínguez	Spain	31:35
2004	Craig Mottram	Australia	28:18	Benita Johnson	Australia	32:36
2005	Eliud Kipchoge	Kenya	27:34	Paula Radcliffe	United Kingdom	31:16
2006	Eliud Kipchoge	Kenya	26:54	Jeļena Prokopčuka	Latvia	31:27
2007	Josphat Menjo	Kenya	28:35	Vivian Cheruiyot	Kenya	31:50
2008	Tadese Tola	Ethiopia	27:53	Marta Domínguez	Spain	33:05
2009	Moses Masai	Kenya	28:01	Vivian Cheruiyot	Kenya	32:15
2010	Zersenay Tadese	Eritrea	28:27	Jéssica Augusto	Portugal	31:59
2011	Hagos Gebrhiwet	Ethiopia	27:57	Tirunesh Dibaba	Ethiopia	31:30
2012	Tariku Bekele	Ethiopia	28:29	Gelete Burka	Ethiopia	30:53
2013	Leonard Komon	Kenya	28:02	Linet Masai	Kenya	31:33
2014	Mike Kigen	Kenya	27:51	Gemma Steel	United Kingdom	31:52
2015	Mike Kigen	Kenya	27:35	Linet Masai	Kenya	31:38
2016	Nguse Tesfaldet	Eritrea	28:09	Brigid Kosgei	Kenya	32:07
2017	Erick Kiptanui	Kenya	27:34	Gelete Burka	Ethiopia	30:55
2018	Jacob Kiplimo	Uganda	26:41	Brigid Kosgei	Kenya	29:54
2019	Bashir Abdi	Belgium	27:47	Helen Bekele Tola	Ethiopia	30:50
2020	Daniel Ebenyo	Kenya	27:41	Yalemzerf Yehualaw	Ethiopia	31:17
2021	Mohamed Katir	Spain	27:45	Degitu Azimeraw	Ethiopia	30:26
2022	Joshua Cheptegei	Uganda	27:09	Prisca Chesang	Uganda	30:19
2023	Berihu Aregawi	Ethiopia	27:15	Ababel Yeshaneh	Ethiopia	30:30
2024	Berihu Aregawi	Ethiopia	26:32	Marta García	Spain	31:19
2025	Geoffrey Kamworor	Kenya	27:40	Marta García	Spain	31:11

=== 1964–1997 ===
Year	Men's winner	Country	Women's winner	Country
1964	Jesús Hurtado	Spain	Not held	
1965	Jesús Hurtado	Spain	Not held	
1966	Mariano Haro	Spain	Not held	
1967	Mohammed Gammoudi	Tunisia	Not held	
1968	Javier Álvarez	Spain	Not held	
1969	Not held		Not held	
1970	Mike Tagg	United Kingdom	Not held	
1971	Mike Tagg	United Kingdom	Not held	
1972	Roger Clark	United Kingdom	Not held	
1973	Mariano Haro	Spain	Not held	
1974	Ian Stewart	United Kingdom	Not held	
1975	Fernando Cerrada	Spain	Not held	
1976	Jim Dingwall	United Kingdom	Not held	
1977	Alastair Hutton	United Kingdom	Not held	
1978	Nat Muir	United Kingdom	Not held	
1979	Carlos Lopes	Portugal	Not held	
1980	Carlos Lopes	Portugal	Not held	
1981	Alex Hagelsteens	Belgium	Grete Waitz	Norway
1982	Steve Harris	United Kingdom	Iciar Martínez	Spain
1983	José Luis González	Spain	Iciar Martínez	Spain
1984	Dave Lewis	United Kingdom	Carmen Mingorance	Spain
1985	Dave Lewis	United Kingdom	Mercedes Calleja	Spain
1986	António Leitão	Portugal	Carmen Valero	Spain
1987	José Luis González	Spain	Tania Merchieres	Belgium
1988	Gerry Curtis	Ireland	Carmen Mingorance	Spain
1989	Arturo Barrios	Mexico	Carmen Fuentes	Spain
1990	Ondoro Osoro	Kenya	Aurora Pérez	Spain
1991	Ondoro Osoro	Kenya	Rosa Mota	Portugal
1992	Paul Bitok	Kenya	María Luisa Muñoz	Spain
1993	Ondoro Osoro	Kenya	Sonia Escudero	Spain
1994	Martín Fiz	Spain	Montse Martínez	Spain
1995	Enrique Molina	Spain	Laura Jiménez	Spain
1996	Isaac Viciosa	Spain	Aurora Pérez	Spain
1997	Alberto García	Spain	Patricia Arribas	Spain
