= Chung Yun-hee =

South Korean long-distance runner

Personal information
- Born: January 3, 1983 (age 42)
- Height: 1.59 m (5 ft 2 1/2 in)
- Weight: 43 kg (95 lb)

Sport
- Country: South Korea
- Sport: Athletics
- Event: Marathon

- Chung Yun-hee
- Hangul: 정윤희
- RR: Jeong Yunhui
- MR: Chŏng Yunhŭi

Chung Yun-hee (Korean: 정윤희; born 3 January 1983) is a South Korean long-distance runner and marathon race specialist.

She began competing in the longer road running events at a comparatively young age and was third in the Seoul Half Marathon in 2001 – her time of 1:17:51 was among the fastest by a junior that year. The following year she made her debut over the full distance at the Seoul International Marathon and secured third place with a time of 2:33:22. She earned a spot on the South Korean team for the 2002 Asian Games in Busan and ran a career best of 32:46.54 for the 10,000 metres, finishing in fifth place. At twenty years old she entered the 2003 JoongAng Seoul Marathon and came away with her first win in the event, setting a course record time of 2:30:50 which stood for four years.

She won the Chunju-Kunsan International Marathon in April 2004 and earned selection for the national Olympic marathon team. At the 2004 Athens Olympics, she finished in 23rd place, the second South Korea past the line after her compatriot Lee Eun-jung. She disappeared from the international athletics scene in 2004 and only re-emerged in 2008.

She made her comeback at the Gyeongju International Marathon in October 2008 and was runner-up behind her national rival Yun Sun-suk. Continuing her focus on the marathon she ran at the Seoul International Marathon and finished in sixth place. A return to Gyeongju in 2010 marked her re-establishment among the elite as she ran her second fastest ever time (2:32:09) to win her first marathon in six years, finishing some sixteen minutes ahead of the field. In March 2011 she was the first Korean home at the Seoul International Marathon, taking third place in a time of 2:32:25.

Chung represented her country on home turf at the 2011 World Championships in Athletics held in Daegu and placed 35th in the women's marathon race. At the 2012 Seoul International Marathon she was eighth and the second Korean finisher. She competed at the 2012 Summer Olympics and finished in 41st place in a time of 2:31:58.
