= Abdellah Falil =

Moroccan long-distance runner

Abdellah Falil (Arabic: عبدالله فليل; born 1976) is a Moroccan professional long-distance runner. He was selected for the national Olympic squad for the 2008 Beijing Olympics and finished 16th in the 10,000 metres final.

He was a cross country runner earlier in his career and represented his country at the 2004 IAAF World Cross Country Championships. His main focus became road running and he began to compete over the shorter road distances in 2006. At the 2006 Lille Half Marathon, he was runner-up behind Joseph Maregu by one second, setting a personal best run of 1:01:21. Falil took part in the Paris Half Marathon in March 2007 and he finished fourth with an improved time of 1:00:43, while Maregu again took the top honours. He won the Corrida de Langueux that year with a course record time of 27:56, which was also a Moroccan record for the 10K distance.

Returning to the grass circuits, he formed part of the Moroccan team for the 2008 IAAF World Cross Country Championships and placed 28th overall, leading a national team including Jamel Chatbi and Anis Selmouni to fifth place in the rankings. In 2008 he made his debut over the marathon distance, running in the Enschede Marathon in the Netherlands. He managed to finish in seventh place and set a first time mark of 2:13:37. Among his other road races, he was seventh in the 20 van Alphen race, taking seventh place and setting a 20 km personal best of 57:57 minutes. He ran a 10,000 m best of 27:40.58 in Casablanca in June before going on to compete in the 2008 Olympic final in the event.

His major competition in 2009 was the Turin Marathon. Improving upon his previous best with a run of 2:12:37, he finished the race in fourth place as Kenyan Benson Barus won the title. He started his 2010 road running season at the Marrakech Half Marathon in January and he managed to finish as runner-up to Azmeraw Bekele. Running the third marathon of his career, he demonstrated a significant improvement with a run of 2:09:24 at the Gyeongju International Marathon, reducing his personal best in excess of three minutes to take a clear second place after Dejene Yirdawe.

He ran his following race in South Korea and took second place at the Daegu Marathon, setting a career best time of 2:08:18 hours in the process.
