= Seoul Marathon =

The Seoul Marathon may refer to one of three races:

- The Dong-A Ilbo Seoul International Marathon, established in 1931 and taking place every March
- The JoongAng Seoul Marathon, established in 1999 and taking place every November
- The Hi Seoul Marathon, an annual fun run for non-professionals
