= Dejene Yirdaw =

Ethiopian long-distance runner

Personal information
- Born: 21 August 1978 (age 47) Tulu Bolo, Ethiopia

Sport
- Country: Ethiopia
- Sport: Athletics
- Event: Long-distance running

Dejene Yirdaw (born 21 August 1978 in Tulu Bolo) is an Ethiopian long-distance runner who specialises in the marathon. He represented Ethiopia at the 2009 World Championships in Athletics and has won the Gyeongju International Marathon and the Kosice Peace Marathon. He personal best for the distance is 2 hours and 8:30 minutes.

== Career ==
His first top level appearances came in 2007: he ran at the Nedbank half marathon in Bloemfontein in April, coming seventh with a time of 1:03:51, and then in October he entered into his first marathon race, the Dublin Marathon, and managed to finish in third place with a time of 2:11:08. He competed in the United States for the first time the following year and his run of 2:14:20 was enough for second place behind Michael Aish at the Rock 'n' Roll Arizona Marathon. The Kosice Peace Marathon was the venue for his third outing over the distance that October, and he seized control of the race, outrunning even the official pacemaker (David Makori). He completed his first win over the distance in a personal best time of 2:10:51 and became only the third Ethiopian to win the men's race, breaking an almost forty-year dry spell since Abebe Bikila and Demissie Wolde's wins in the 1960s.

His performance at the Seoul International Marathon in 2009 gave Dejene a number of scalps over quicker, more established runners. Knocking almost two and a half minutes of his personal best, Dejene was the only athlete to pursue the eventual winner Moses Arusei. Finishing as the runner-up with a time of 2:08:30, he had beaten pre-race favourites Jason Mbote and Paul Biwott by a margin of two minutes. He was selected for the Ethiopian men's marathon team at the 2009 World Championships in Athletics, earning his first major national selection at the age of 30. He finished in 15th place as the third fastest Ethiopian in 2:15:09, a time which (alongside Tsegay Kebede and Yemane Tsegay) helped Ethiopia to the team silver medal as part of the Marathon World Cup section of the race.

He began his 2010 season at the Dubai Marathon in January and finished in seventh place. He ran over 20 km at the 20 van Alphen race in the Netherlands and managed second place behind Bernard Chepkok with a best of 58:22 for the distance. At the Gyeongju International Marathon he completed his second sub-2:10 clocking to win the race in 2:09:13, holding off a challenge from Moroccan runner Abdellah Falil.
