= James Kwambai =

Kenyan marathon runner

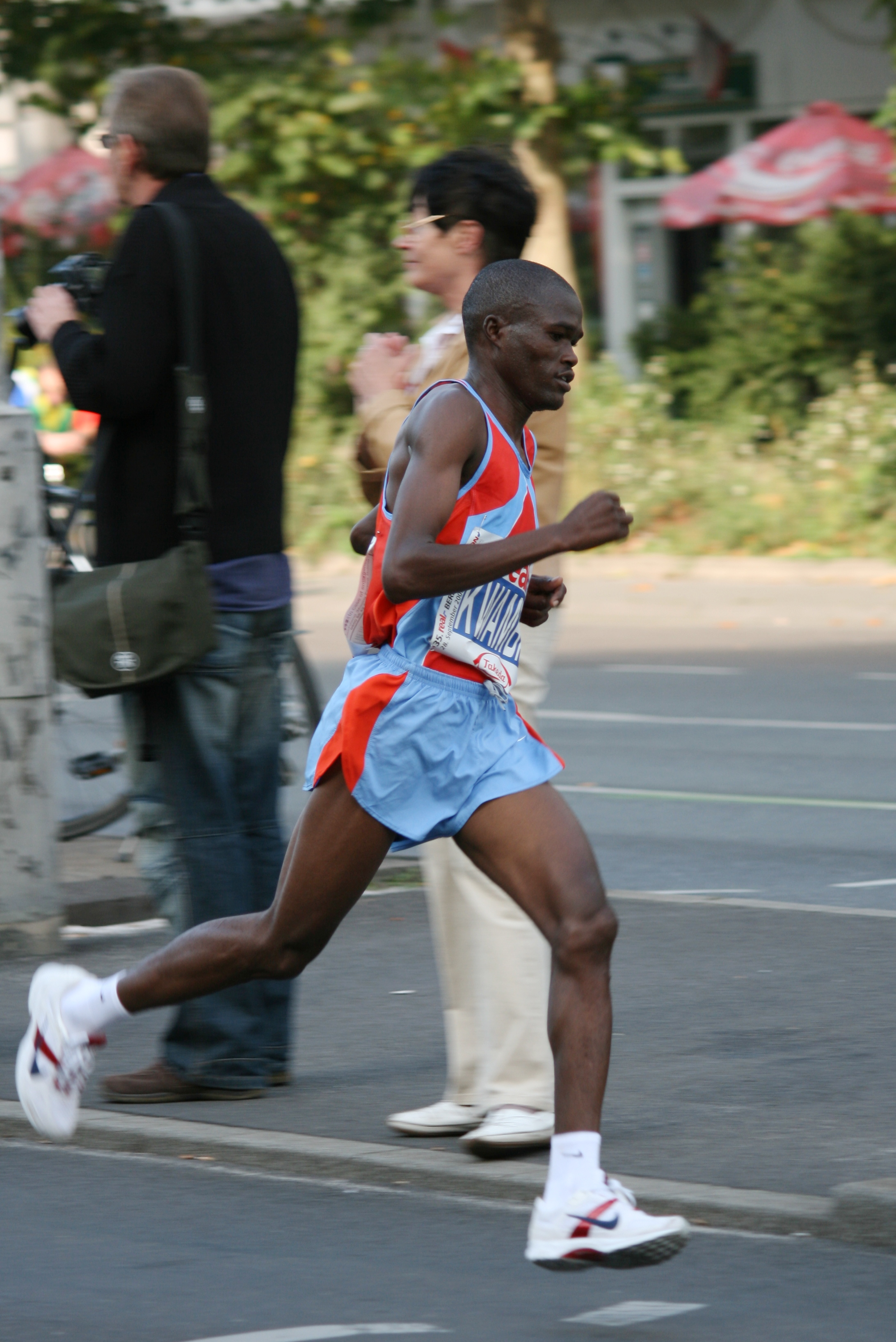
Kipsang Kwambai at the 2008 Berlin Marathon

James Kipsang Kwambai (born February 28, 1983) is a runner from Kenya, who specialises in marathons. He is a former Kenyan record holder in the event, with his personal best of 2:04:27 hours in 2009. At the time this made him the second fastest runner ever, behind Haile Gebrselassie.

== Biography ==
Kwambai went to the Kondabilet Primary School in Marakwet East District, but dropped out at standard seven.

He won the Marseille-Cassis Classique Internationale in 2002, breaking the course record by over a minute. In 2006 Kwambai won the Brescia Marathon and Beijing Marathon, which were his first two marathons. He also won the 2008 and the 2009 Saint Silvester Road Race.

He finished second at the 2008 Berlin Marathon, where Haile Gebrselassie set a new marathon world record. Kwambai's time was 2:05:36, that made him the seventh fastest ever marathon runner at the time. At the 2009 Rotterdam Marathon Kwambai again finished second (behind Duncan Kibet) in a time of 2:04:27, the third fastest ever marathon at the time. At the 2010 New York City Marathon he completed the race in 2:11:31, which brought him fifth place. He returned to defend his title at the Saint Silvester race in São Paulo but ended up in third place behind Marílson dos Santos and Barnabas Kosgei.

His first race of 2011 was the CPC Loop Den Haag, but he was off the winning pace and came sixth in a time of one hour and one second. He was among the leaders at the 2011 London Marathon by the 30 km mark, but dropped out of the race. In August he came second at the Rio de Janeiro Half Marathon, but was eighth at the Udine Half Marathon the following month, finishing well off his best in 1:02:06 hours. His season peaked in November when he took the title at the JoongAng Seoul Marathon in a time of 2:08:50 hours, despite rainy conditions. He took on the city's other major race, the Seoul International Marathon, in March 2012 and ran his best race in three years, finishing in 2:06:03 hours to take second behind Wilson Loyanae. In November he competed at the 2012 JoongAng Seoul Marathon, won it convincingly and broke the course record by 2:23 minutes, with a time of 2:05:50 hours.

He was among the fastest entrants at the 2013 Tokyo Marathon, but came fifth a minute and a half behind winner Dennis Kimetto. He was back in form in Seoul in November as he won in 2:06:25 hours for third straight victory at the race (the first person to do so). He ran at the city's other major race, the Seoul International Marathon, in March 2014 but his time of 2:07:38 was only enough for sixth place in a quick race.

Kwambai prefers road running over track and cross-country. His training partners include Robert Kipkoech Cheruiyot, Martin Lel, Sammy Korir and Fred Kiprop in Eldoret and Italy. Kwambai has been coached by Gabriele Rosa and Claudio Berardelli.

== Achievements ==
- All results regarding marathon and half marathon

Year	Competition	Venue	Position	Notes
2003	San Blas Half Marathon	Coamo, Puerto Rico	2nd	1:03:29
2003	Berlin Half Marathon	Berlin, Germany	3rd	1:01:56
2004	Eldoret Half Marathon	Eldoret, Kenya	3rd	1:01:43
2004	San Blas Half Marathon	Coamo, Puerto Rico	2nd	1:03:18
2004	Udine Half Marathon	Udine, Italy	1st	1:00:22
2005	Bogota Half Marathon	Bogotá, Colombia	1st	1:03:10
2005	Virginia Beach Rock 'n' Roll Half Marathon	Virginia Beach, VA	2nd	1:01:05
2005	Rome-Ostia Half Marathon	Rome, Italy	1st	1:00:45
2006	Virginia Beach Rock 'n' Roll Half Marathon	Virginia Beach, VA	1st	1:00:57
2006	Bogota Half Marathon	Bogotá, Colombia	2nd	1:03:05
2006	Brescia Marathon	Brescia, Italy	1st	2:10:20
2006	Beijing Marathon	Beijing, China	1st	2:10:36
2007	Boston Marathon	Boston, United States	2nd	2:14:33
2007	New York City Half Marathon	New York City	4th	1:01:03
2007	New York City Marathon	New York City	5th	2:12:25
2008	Virginia Beach Rock 'n' Roll Half Marathon	Virginia Beach, VA	1st	1:01:05
2008	Rome-Ostia Half Marathon	Rome, Italy	2nd	1:00:22
2008	Berlin Marathon	Berlin, Germany	2nd	2:05:36
2009	Rotterdam Half Marathon	Rotterdam, Netherlands	3rd	59:09
2009	Rotterdam Marathon	Rotterdam, Netherlands	2nd	2:04:27
2010	New York City Marathon	New York City	5th	2:11:31
2011	CPC Loop Den Haag	The Hague, Netherlands	6th	1:00:01
2011	JoongAng Seoul Marathon	Seoul, South Korea	1st	2:08:50
2012	Seoul International Marathon	Seoul, South Korea	2nd	2:06:03
2012	JoongAng Seoul Marathon	Seoul, South Korea	1st	2:05:50
2013	Tokyo Marathon	Tokyo, Japan	5th	2:08:02
2013	JoongAng Seoul Marathon	Seoul, South Korea	1st	2:06:25
2014	Seoul International Marathon	Seoul, South Korea	6th	2:07:38
2014	JoongAng Seoul Marathon	Seoul, South Korea	9th	2:11:31
2015	JoongAng Seoul Marathon	Seoul, South Korea	4th	2:09:23
2016	Daegu Marathon	Daegu, South Korea	1st	2:10:46
2017	Lanzhou Marathon	Lanzhou, China	8th	2:17:45
