= Dejene =

Dejene (also Dejen or Dejenee) is a male name of Ethiopian origin that may refer to:

- Dejene Berhanu (1980–2010), Ethiopian long-distance runner
- Dejene Yirdaw (born 1978), Ethiopian marathon runner
- Dejen Gebremeskel (born 1989), Ethiopian long-distance runner
- Dejenee Regassa (born 1989), Ethiopian long-distance runner competing for Bahrain
- Dejene Hidoto (born 1972), Ethiopian Bishop for the Vicariate of Soddo in Ethiopia
