= Arusei =

Arusei is a surname of Kenyan origin that may refer to:

- Moses Kimeli Arusei (born 1983), Kenyan marathon runner and 2006 Seoul International Marathon winner
- Peninah Arusei (born 1979), Kenyan long-distance track and road runner
- Simon Arusei (born 1977), Kenyan long-distance track and cross country runner
- Stephen Kipkorir (1970–2008), Kenyan middle-distance runner and Olympic medallist
