= Oh Joo-han =

Korean long-distance runner

Wilson Loyanae Erupe
- Born: 20 November 1988 (age 37); Lodwar, Kenya
- Other names: Wilson Loyanai Ekupe; Oh Joo-han
- Citizenship: Kenya, South Korea
- Years active: 2010-present

Wilson Loyanae Erupe, also known as Wilson Loyanai Ekupe, (born 20 November 1988 in Lodwar) is a Kenyan born Korean long-distance runner who competes in marathons. He has a personal best of 2:05:13 hours for the event and has won races in Mombasa, Gyeongju and Seoul. He has represented South Korea under the name Oh Joo-han, since 2018.

Hailing from Lodwar in Kenya's Turkana District, Loyanae began running in marathon races in his native country in 2010. That year he was sixth at the Kisumu Marathon and seventh at the Kass Marathon. The 2011 running season saw him establish himself as a marathoner of international calibre. He won the Mombasa Marathon in a time of 2:13:00 hours and stated his desire to begin competing on the World Marathon Majors circuit.

He ran in his first foreign race in October 2011 at South Korea's Gyeongju International Marathon and he won with a personal best time of 2:09:23 hours. His next outing was again in South Korea, this time at the higher profile Seoul International Marathon, and he managed to continue his winning streak. Beating the more favoured Kenyans, James Kipsang Kwambai and Eliud Kiptanui, he knocked almost four minutes off his best time to set a course record of 2:05:37 hours – a mark which moved him into the top 30 runners of all time. He defended his title in Gyeongju with a course record run of 2:06:46. His first race of 2013 saw him place third in the Houston Half Marathon.

Erupe tested positive for EPO in an out-of-competition test in 2012 and was banned from competing for two years in February 2013.

In 2016, he established a new personal best of 2:05:13 to win the Seoul International Marathon.
