= Yemane Tsegay =

Ethiopian long-distance runner

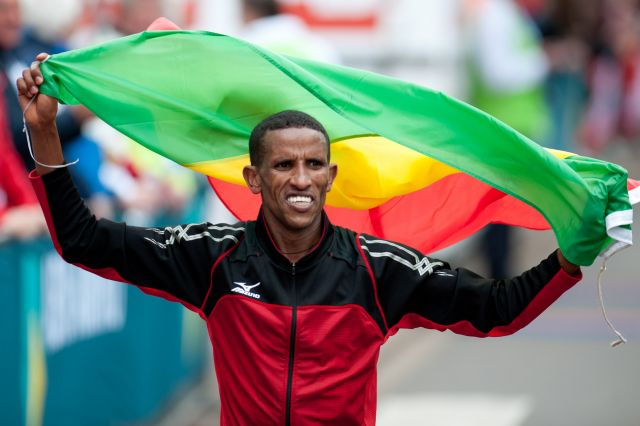
- Rotterdam 2012

Medal record

Men's athletics

Representing Ethiopia

World Championships
Silver medal – second place	2015 Beijing	Marathon

Yemane Adhane Tsegay (born 8 April 1985) is an Ethiopian long-distance runner who specialises in the marathon. He won the 2012 Rotterdam Marathon with a personal best time of 2:04:48 hours. He has also won marathons in Eindhoven, Gyeongju, Macau and Taipei.

== Career ==
He began competing in international races in 2008 and finished third at the Casablanca Marathon that year, posting a time of 2:13:29. He had his first victory at the end of the year, winning the Macau Marathon in December. He opened 2009 with a second-place finish at the Marrakech Marathon in January. Yemane made significant progress at the Paris International Marathon in April that year: although he finished in fourth place, he clocked a much improved personal best of 2:06:30.

He qualified to represent Ethiopia at the World Championships in Athletics and put in a strong debut performance at the 2009 World Championships Marathon race with a time of 2:08:42, just seven seconds behind bronze medallist Tsegay Kebede. Two months later he recorded his third consecutive sub-2:09 time, breaking the course record at the Gyeongju International Marathon in the process.

In the 2010 season, he started by setting a new half marathon best of 1:01:50 at the Zayed International Half Marathon. He stepped back up to the full distance for the Lake Biwa Marathon and won in cold conditions, beating Tomoyuki Sato and Hendrick Ramaala to the finish. He improved further at the Prague Half Marathon with a quick run of 1:01:37 for third place, in spite of poor conditions. He was the race favourite for the Prague Marathon in May, but late entrant Eliud Kiptanui won the race instead, leaving Tsegay as runner-up with a time of 2:07:11. He was dissatisfied with the run, saying that he classified 2:05 as a good time for his ability. He ran at the Berlin Marathon in September 2010 and finished in fourth place, running 2:07:52 in wet conditions.

He was among the favourites for the 2011 Tokyo Marathon but never looked likely to win the race and ended up in ninth with a comparatively slow time of 2:11:49. He was eighth at the Prague Marathon but performed well in east Asia near the end of the year, coming third at the JoongAng Seoul Marathon in a time of 2:10:47 hours in spite of poor weather, then setting a race record of 2:10:24 hours to win the Taipei Marathon.

Yemane improved his personal best by a second at the 2012 Dubai Marathon, but his time of 2:06:29 hours brought him only tenth place in the quick race, which saw him beaten by eight other Ethiopians. He achieved a significantly faster time at the 2012 Rotterdam Marathon, winning the event in 2:04:48, just one second ahead of countryman Getu Feleke, and bringing himself up to eighth place on the all-time lists.

The majority of his 2013 season was geared towards preparation for the 2013 World Championships Marathon, where ultimately he fell off the pace and finished in eighth with a time of 2:11:43 hours. He made a successful return to the Dutch road racing circuit by winning the Eindhoven Marathon in a time of 2:09:11 hours.

In May 2014, Tsegay won the Ottawa Marathon in 2:06:54, setting a new Canadian soil record as well as the course record.

He is married to Abeba Aregawi.

== Personal bests ==
Event	Time (h:m:s)	Venue	Date
Half marathon	1:01:37	Prague, Czech Republic	27 March 2010
Marathon	2:04:48	Rotterdam, Netherlands	15 April 2012

- All information taken from IAAF profile.

== Marathons ==
Year	Competition	Venue	Position	Notes
2008	Casablanca Marathon	Casablanca, Morocco	3rd	2:13:29
2008	Macau International Marathon	Macau, China	1st	2:15:06
2009	Marrakesh Marathon	Marrakesh, Morocco	2nd	2:10:48
2009	Paris Marathon	Paris, France	4th	2:06:30
2009	2009 World Championships	Berlin, Germany	4th	2:08:42
2009	Gyeongju International Marathon	Gyeongju, South Korea	1st	2:08:52
2010	Lake Biwa Marathon	Ōtsu, Japan	1st	2:09:34
2010	Prague Marathon	Prague, Czech Republic	2nd	2:07:11
2010	Berlin Marathon	Berlin, Germany	4th	2:07:52
2011	Tokyo Marathon	Tokyo, Japan	9th	2:11:49
2011	Prague Marathon	Prague, Czech Republic	8th	2:13:41
2011	JTBC Seoul Marathon	Seoul, South Korea	3rd	2:10:47
2011	Taipei Marathon	Taipei, Taiwan	1st	2:10:24
2012	Dubai Marathon	Dubai, United Arab Emirates	10th	2:06:29
2012	Rotterdam Marathon	Rotterdam, the Netherlands	1st	2:04:48
2013	2013 World Championships	Moscow, Russia	8th	2:11:43
2013	Eindhoven Marathon	Eindhoven, the Netherlands	1st	2:09:11
2013	Taipei Marathon	Taipei, Taiwan	2nd	2:14:17
2014	Daegu Marathon	Daegu, South Korea	1st	2:06:51
2014	Ottawa Marathon	Ottawa, Canada	1st	2:06:54
2014	Honolulu Marathon	Honolulu, Hawaii	5th	2:17:54
2015	2015 Boston Marathon	Boston, United States	2nd	2:09:48
2015	2015 World Championships	Beijing, China	2nd	2:13:08
2015	New York City Marathon	New York City, United States	5th	2:13:24
2016	2016 Boston Marathon	Boston, United States	3rd	2:14:02
2016	Fukuoka Marathon	Fukuoka, Japan	1st	2:08:48
2017	2017 Boston Marathon	Boston, United States	12th	2:16:47
2017	Fukuoka Marathon	Fukuoka, Japan	26th	2:18:05
2018	Ottawa Marathon	Ottawa, Canada	1st	2:08:52
2018	Fukuoka Marathon	Fukuoka, Japan	2nd	2:08:54

- All information taken from World Athletics profile and Association of Road Racing Statisticians (ARRS) profile.
