= Shifera Tamru Aredo =

Ethiopian long-distance runner

Personal information
- Born: 1 October 1998 (age 27) Ethiopia
- Occupation: Long-distance runner
- Years active: 2018–present

Sport
- Sport: Athletics
- Event(s): Marathon, Half marathon

Achievements and titles
- Personal bests: Marathon: 2:05:18 (2019); Half marathon: 1:00:47 (2022)

Shifera Tamru Aredo (born 1 October 1998) is an Ethiopian long-distance runner who competes in international road races, specializing in the marathon. He has recorded a personal best of 2:05:18 in the marathon and has won notable races including the 2022 Daegu Marathon. Tamru was also runner-up at the 2023 Seoul International Marathon and a top-five finisher at both the Dubai and Chicago Marathons. He placed third in the 2025 Dubai Marathon.

== Career ==
In 2018, Tamru won the Chuncheon Marathon in South Korea, finishing in 2:08:50 on 28 October. The race attracted a crowd of over 50,000 spectators and marked his first international victory.

Shifera Tamru Aredo began his professional road running career with a strong debut at the 2019 Dubai Marathon, where he achieved his personal best time of 2:05:18, securing a fifth-place finish.

Tamru placed fifth at the 2021 Chicago Marathon with a time of 2:09:39. He took the lead and gapped the field by 15 seconds early in the race, but was caught by the half-way marker.

The following year, Tamru won the 2022 Daegu Marathon, finishing in 2:06:31. Later, he returned to the 2022 Chicago Marathon, where he recorded another top-five finish, coming in fifth with a time of 2:07:53.

Tamru made his Honolulu Marathon debut at the 2022 edition. He struggled with training in Hawaii because although it was hot like Ethiopia, he was used to less humidity. Due to the weather, Tamru had to adjust his race strategy. He did not finish the race.

In 2023, Tamru was runner-up at the Seoul Marathon with a time of 2:05:41.

Tamru is coached by Yirefu Birhanu Derb.

== Achievements ==
Year	Race	Location	Position	Time
2018	Chuncheon Marathon	Chuncheon	1st	2:08:50
2019	Dubai Marathon	Dubai	5th	2:05:18 (PB)
2021	Chicago Marathon	Chicago	5th	2:09:39
2022	Daegu Marathon	Daegu	1st	2:06:31
2022	Chicago Marathon	Chicago	5th	2:07:53
2023	Seoul Marathon	Seoul	2nd	2:05:41
2025	Dubai Marathon	Dubai	3rd	2:05:28
