= Seoul International Marathon =

Marathon held in Seoul, South Korea

- Date: Mid-March
- Location: Seoul, South Korea
- Event type: Road
- Distance: Marathon
- Established: 1931/1964/1993
- Course records: Men's: 2:04:43 (2022) (Ethiopia) Mosinet Geremew; Women's: 2:18:04 (2022) (Romania) Joan Chelimo
- Website: Seoul International Marathon

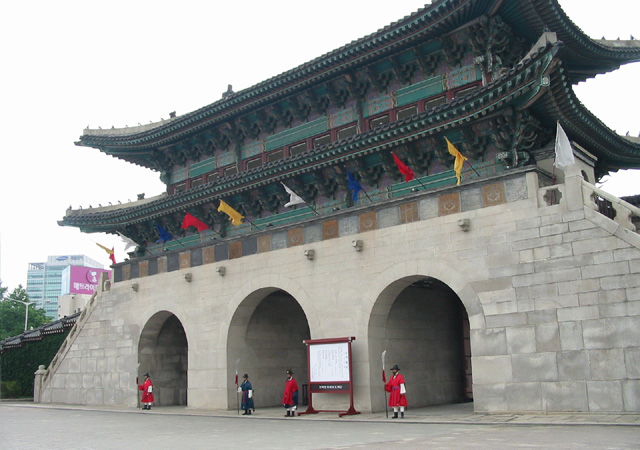
The main gate to Gyeongbokgung Palace on Gwanghwamun Plaza, where the race begins.

The Seoul International Marathon (Korean: 서울 국제 마라톤; RR: Seoul Gugje Malaton), also known as The Dong-A Ilbo Seoul Marathon or Seoul Marathon, is an annual marathon race that takes place in Seoul, South Korea. It is hosted by the newspaper The Dong-A Ilbo. It is one of two annual races over the 42.195 km classic distance in the city, alongside the JoongAng Seoul Marathon which is held in November. It holds World Athletics Platinum Label Road Race status. First held in 1931, it is the third longest-running road running competition in Asia after the Hakone Ekiden and Chugoku Yamaguchi Ekiden in Japan.

The race has been integral to the elite level of the sport in Korea, as ten of the 28 South Korean national records in the marathon have been set at the competition. The day's races attract around 35,000 people on a yearly basis.

== History ==
The marathon can be traced back to the Youngdungpo Marathon, which was first held in 1931. It was not a true marathon and the looped course in the city measured roughly 50 ri (around 23.3 km). The race was contested between fourteen of the country's top male runners and Seoul's Kim Eun-Bae won the first edition. Kim and the 1933 winner Sohn Kee-chung both went on to compete at the Olympic marathon, although they did so under the flag of Japan as Korea was part of the Japanese empire at that time.

This fact contributed to the suspension of the 1937 race: the event's sponsor, Korean broadsheet The Dong-A Ilbo, censored the Japanese flag in its reports of Sohn's marathon victory at the 1936 Berlin Olympics and the colonial government responded by suspending both the newspaper and the race. The race returned as an annual fixture from 1938 to 1940 but was again discontinued, initially due to World War II and later because of the Korean War. The race returned in April 1954 and Im Jong-Woo became the first person to win twice, taking back-to-back victories in 1954 and 1955.

The competition's first official full-length marathon was contested in 1964 and the change brought about improvements in the national standards as Lee Myeong-Jeong set a South Korean record to win in 1965 and Kim Bong-Nae became the first Korean to run under two hours twenty minutes a year later. At the 1970 edition, Canadian Ron Wallingford and two Japanese runners provided the race with its first international competitors. The quality of the field saw domestic runner Kim Cha-Wan react with a national record run of 2:17:34.4 to win the race. Kim improved his mark again in 1973 and went on to become the Dong-A Marathon's most prolific winner, scoring four victories in the 1970s. Japanese marathoner Toyoichi Masuda became the first foreign winner in 1977 and he was soon joined by his countryman Makoto Matsuzaki, who won two years afterwards. A women's 10 km race was added to the programme in 1979 and Moon Ki-sook became the first women's Dong-A champion.

Im Eun-Joo won a women's 30 km race in 1981 and female runners were allowed to take on the full marathon distance the following year. She went on to claim three straight marathon titles from 1983 to 1985. The 1982 race hosted a dual domestic and international race, with results kept separate for the divisions. In anticipation of the 1988 Seoul Olympics, the city also hosted separate international races from 1983 up to 1987 (which was the IAAF World Marathon Cup race). The Dong-A competition in the 1980s saw the men's record reach 2:12 territory through Jang-hee Lee in 1987.

Seoul's Olympic Stadium, where the race finishes

With the advent of another decade, Won-Tak Kim brought the men's record down to 2:11:38 in 1990, winning the Asian Marathon Championship which was hosted within the race that year. Hwang Young-cho, Seoul's winner in 1991, went on to take the gold medal at the 1992 Barcelona Olympics. Kim Wan-gi reduced the national record further to 2:09:25 in 1993. The marathon was moved to Chuncheon for the 1992 event and had a seven-year stint in Gyeongju from 1993 to 1999. It returned to Seoul in 2000, but its impact in the latter city led to the creation of the Gyeongju International Marathon.

The event took on a more international nature from 1994 onwards, renaming itself the Dong-A International Marathon; following the invitation of runners from twelve countries, Manuel Matias of Portugal became the first winner from outside of Korea and Japan. The marathon reached a landmark of over 10,000 starters in 1999 as 11,303 runners signed up for the full distance in the elite and popular races.

China's Wei Yanan brought the women's record down to 2:25:06 in 2002, knocking over five minutes off the previous course best. Gert Thys had two consecutive victories in 2003 and 2004 (recording a record time of 2:07:06 in the latter), but a third win in 2006 was erased after he failed a drugs test for the banned steroid norandrosterone. The runner-up Jason Mbote was declared the winner, but after a protracted legal battle Thys had his ban overturned in 2012 due to a breach of the rules in the way his sample was handled. At the 2002 edition, Zhou Chunxiu of PR China became the seventh woman to ever finish under two hours and twenty minutes as she set the women's record at 2:19:51 hours. Kenyan runner Sylvester Teimet beat the men's record in 2010 with his win in 2:06:49 hours. Three Kenyans went under this time in 2012, with Wilson Loyanae's time of 2:05:37 hours knocking more than a minute off the record.

The 2020 edition of the race was cancelled due to the coronavirus pandemic, with all runners receiving a full refund.

== Course ==
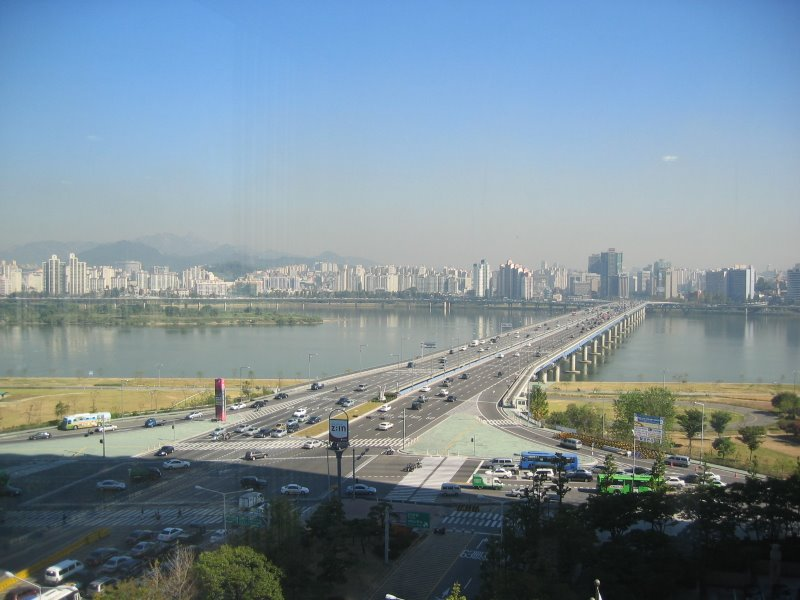
The route crosses over the city's Han River.

The competition begins at Gwanghwamun Plaza in the city centre and finishes at the Olympic Stadium. The course has a point-to-point format and traces a south-easterly path through the city centre. After departing from the main plaza, the route flows into Sejongno thoroughfare and passes the statue of Yi Sun-sin. The runners then pass the Namdaemun gateway and head through Cheonggyecheon park. The route traces a pass through Dongdaemun-gu district before crossing the Han River to head towards the stadium finishing point.

== Past winners ==
=== Pre-marathon ===
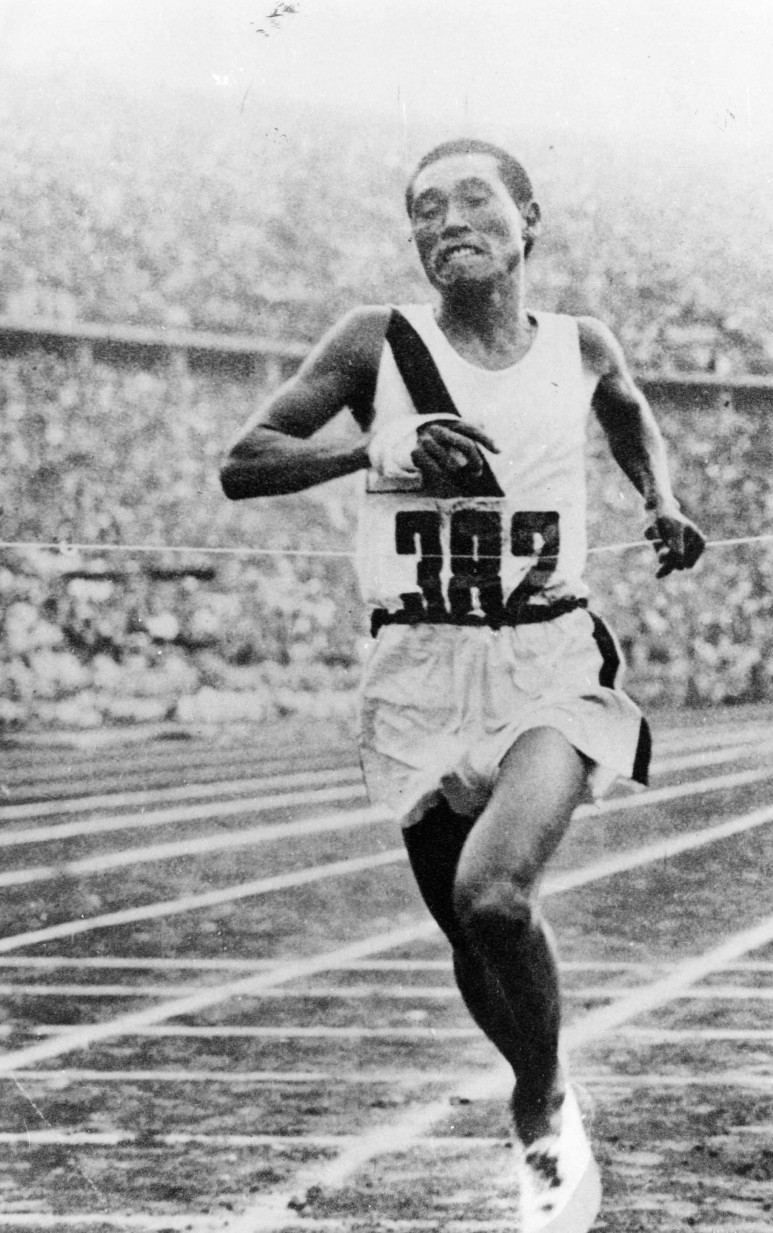
Sohn Kee-chung won the competition in 1933, three years before his Olympic marathon win.

Key: 14.5-mile race 15-mile race
Note: All other years approx 25 km (16 mi)

Edition	Year	Men's winner	Time (h:m:s)
1st	1931	Kim Eun-bae (JPN)	1:22:05
2nd	1932	Byun Yong-han (JPN)	1:21:51
3rd	1933	Sohn Kee-chung (JPN)	1:24:03
4th	1934	Yoo Jang-choon (JPN)	1:20:34
5th	1935	Lee Tae-woo (JPN)	1:22:43
6th	1936	Oh Dong-woo (JPN)	1:20:11
—	1937	Banned	
7th	1938	Yoo Koan-huang (JPN)	1:29:09
8th	1939	Ji Young-ryung (JPN)	1:28:12
9th	1940	Hyun Jung-hyo (JPN)	1:29:02
Not held from 1941 to 1953 due to World War II and Korean War
10th	1954	Im Jong-woo (KOR)	1:23:43
11th	1955	Im Jong-woo (KOR)	1:23:16
12th	1956	Han Seung-chul (KOR)	1:21:42
13th	1957	Lee Chang-hoon (KOR)	1:20:28
14th	1958	Oh Chun-taek (KOR)	1:21:15
15th	1959	Lee Sang-cheol (KOR)	1:20:12
16th	1960	Cha Dae-man (KOR)	1:20:17
17th	1961	Kang Yang-tae (KOR)	1:19:55
18th	1962	Han Jae-duk (KOR)	1:18:54
19th	1963	Kim Bong-nae (KOR)	1:21:53

=== Marathon ===
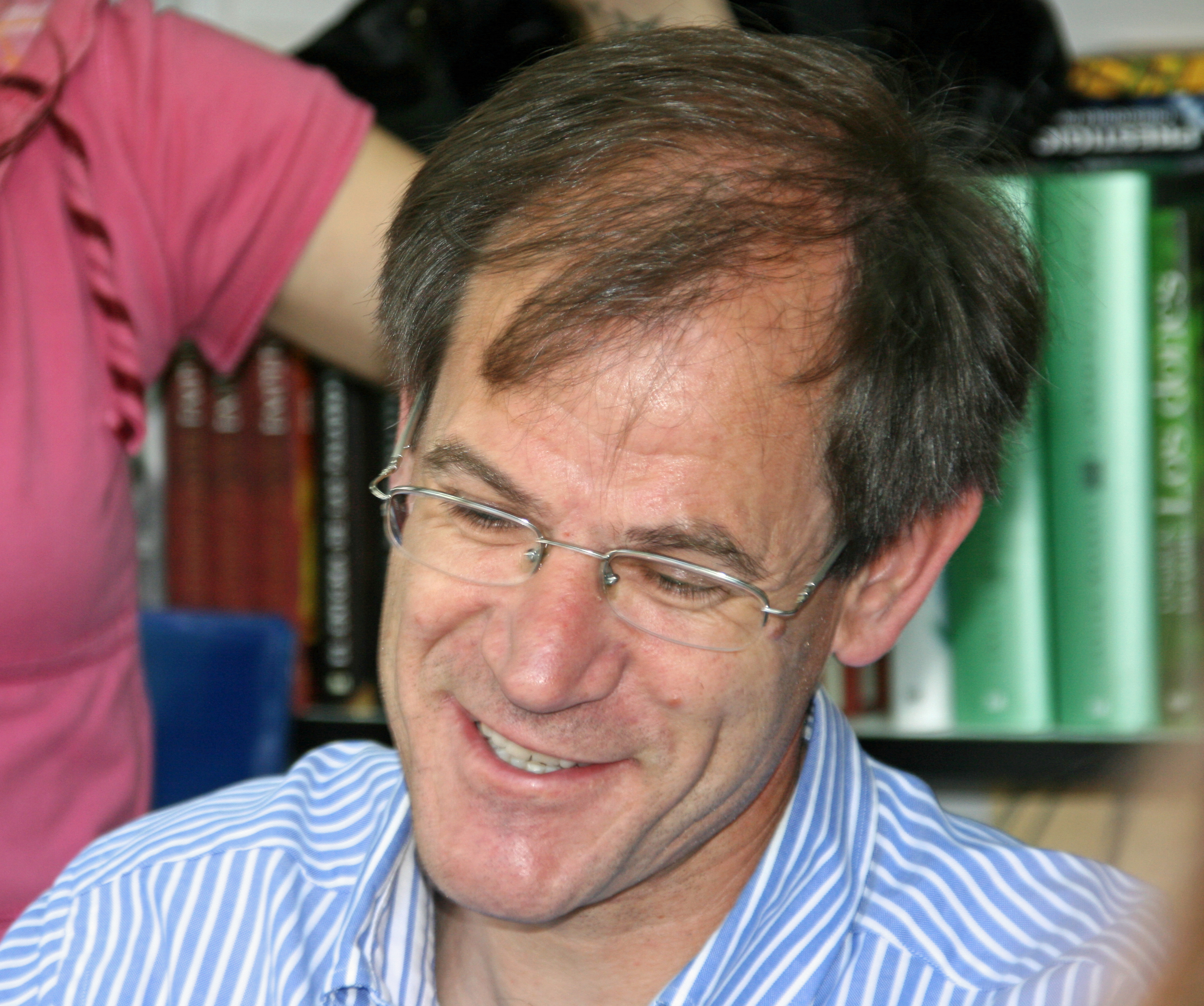
Abel Antón of Spain was among the first foreign winners.

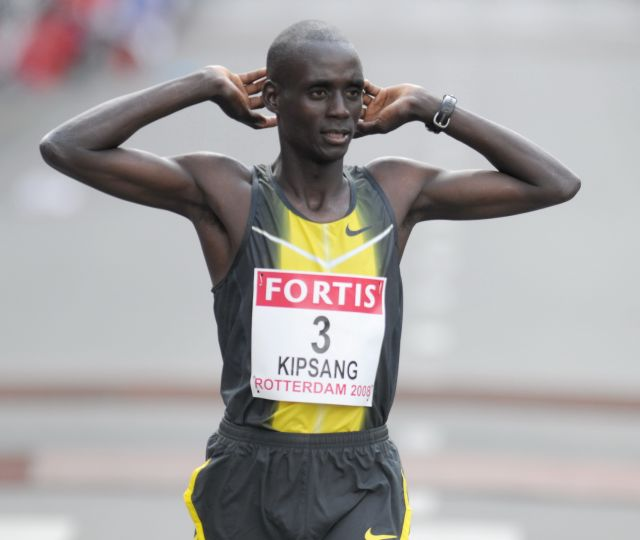
William Kipsang became the event's first Kenyan winner in 2005.

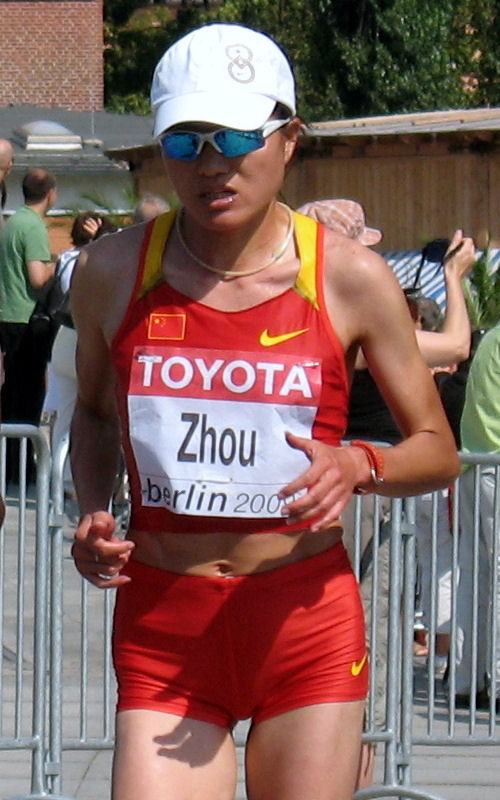
China's Zhou Chunxiu was women's record holder in 2006.

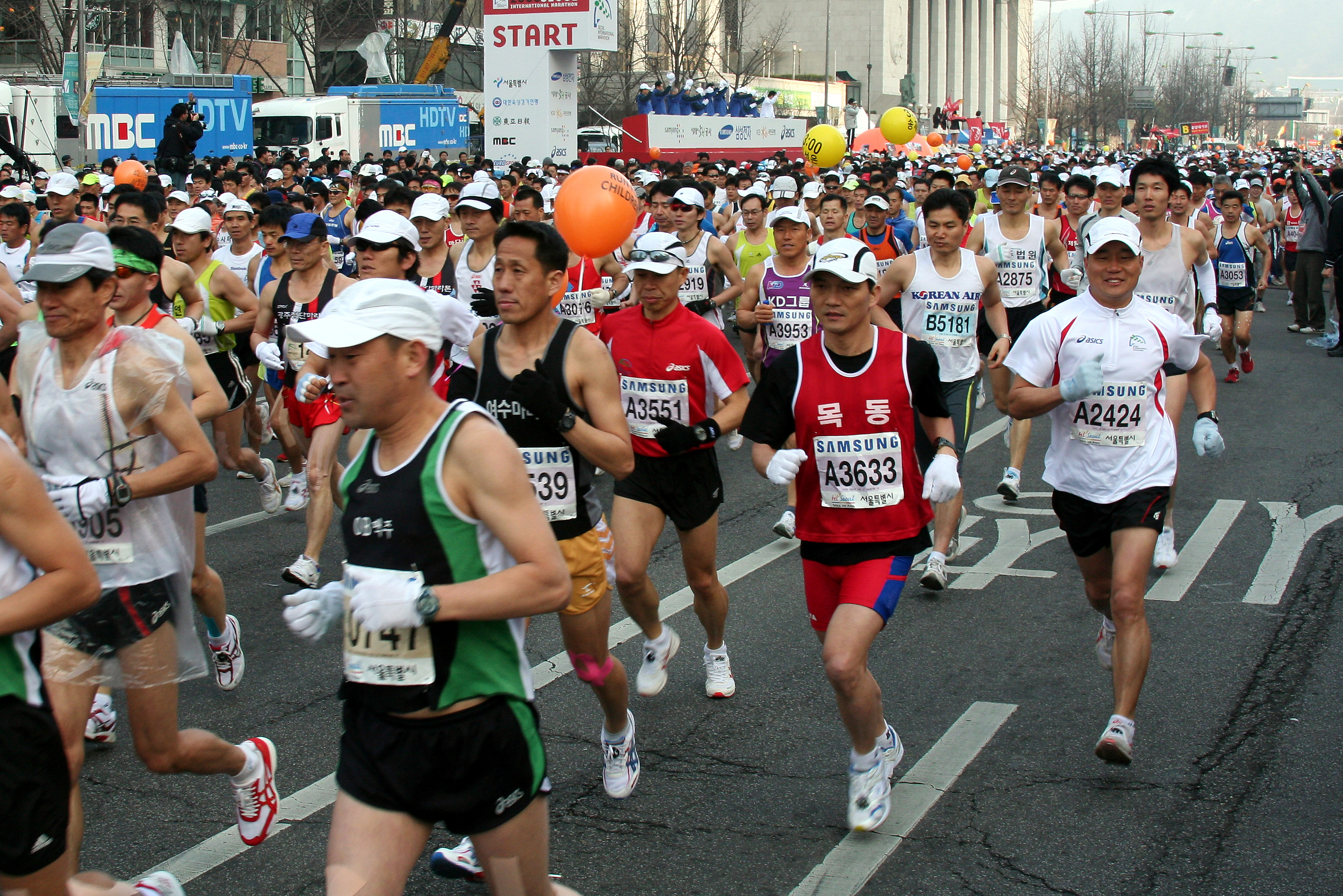
Fun runners in the popular race in 2008

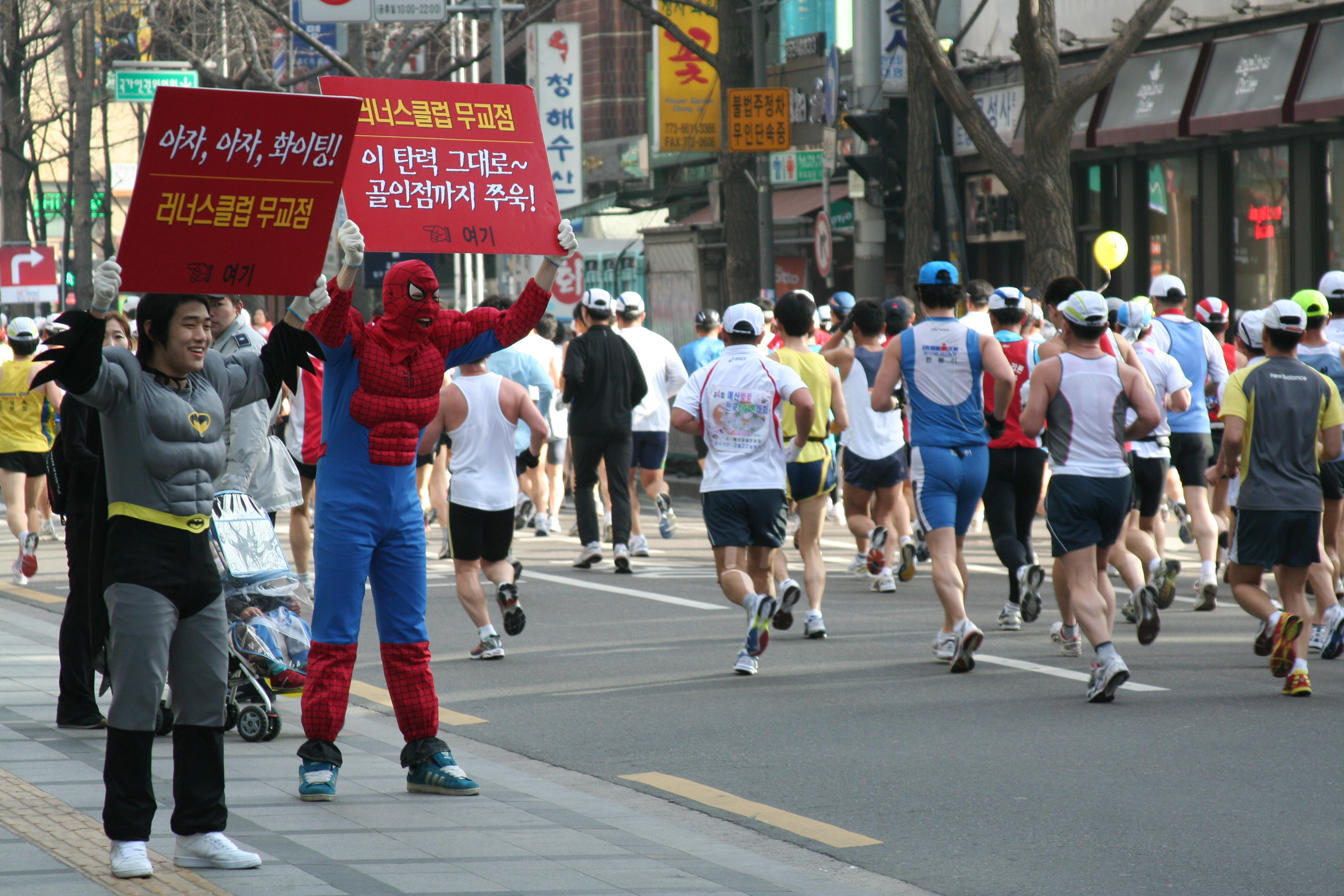
Race supporters in costumes in 2008

Key: Course record Asian Championship race

Edition	Year	Men's winner	Time (h:m:s)	Women's winner	Time (h:m:s)
20th	1964	Lee Chang-hoon (KOR)	2:27:13.8	—	—
21st	1965	Lee Myeong-jeong (KOR)	2:21:21.6	—	—
22nd	1966	Kim Bong-nae (KOR)	2:19:07	—	—
23rd	1967	Yu Myung-jong (KOR)	2:19:44	—	—
24th	1968	Kim Bong-nae (KOR)	2:19:42.9	—	—
25th	1969	Song Keum-yong (KOR)	2:20:28	—	—
26th	1970	Kim Cha-wan (KOR)	2:17:34.4	—	—
27th	1971	Cho Je-hyung (KOR)	2:19:15.8	—	—
28th	1972	Kim Cha-wan (KOR)	2:19:34.4	—	—
29th	1973	Kim Cha-wan (KOR)	2:17:01	—	—
30th	1974	Moon Heung-ju (KOR)	2:16:15	—	—
31st	1975	Moon Heung-ju (KOR)	2:21:09.6	—	—
32nd	1976	Park Won-keun (KOR)	2:18:20	—	—
33rd	1977	Toyoichi Masuda (JPN)	2:18:40	—	—
34th	1978	Kim Cha-wan (KOR)	2:17:01	—	—
35th	1979	Makoto Matsuzaki (JPN)	2:17:18	Moon Ki-sook (KOR)	— (10 km)
36th	1980	Susumu Sato (JPN)	2:16:46	Unknown	—
37th	1981	Lee Hong-yeol (KOR)	2:21:23.4	Im Eun-joo (KOR)	2:02:08 (30 km)
38th	1982	Kim Jong-yun (KOR)	2:16:58	An Chun-ja (KOR)	3:01:50
—^{[nb1]}	1982	Lawrie Whitty (AUS)	2:14:34	Allison Roe (NZL)	2:43:12
39th	1983	Chae Hong-nak (KOR)	2:16:33	Im Eun-joo (KOR)	2:48:13
40th	1984	Lee Hong-yeol (KOR)	2:14:59	Im Eun-joo (KOR)	2:39:48
41st	1985	Yu Jae-seong (KOR)	2:15:48	Im Eun-joo (KOR)	2:45:06
42nd	1986	Yu Jae-seong (KOR)	2:14:06	Kim Mi-kyung (KOR)	2:40:41
43rd	1987	Lee Jong-hee (KOR)	2:12:21	Ahn Young-ok (KOR)	2:41:50
44th	1988	Kim Won-tak (KOR)	2:12:41	Lee Mi-ok (KOR)	2:33:14
45th	1989	Im Jung-tae (KOR)	2:15:18	Lee Mi-ok (KOR)	2:39:27
46th	1990	Kim Won-tak (KOR)	2:11:38	Lee Mi-ok (KOR)	2:37:15
47th	1991	Hwang Yeong-cho (KOR)	2:12:35	Lee Mi-ok (KOR)	2:41:43
48th	1992	Kim Jae-ryong (KOR)	2:09:30	Lee Mi-ok (KOR)	2:36:44
49th	1993	Kim Wan-gi (KOR)	2:09:25	Chung Young-im (KOR)	2:45:52
50th	1994	Manuel Matias (POR)	2:08:33	Lee Mi-kyung (KOR)	2:35:44
51st	1995	Lee Bong-ju (KOR)	2:10:58	Lee Mi-kyung (KOR)	2:38:08
52nd	1996	Martín Fiz (ESP)	2:08:25	Oh Mi-ja (KOR)	2:30:09
53rd	1997	Abel Antón (ESP)	2:12:37	Bang Seon-hee (KOR)	2:43:40
54th	1998	Kim Yi-yong (KOR)	2:12:24	Oh Mi-ja (KOR)	2:37:16
55th	1999	Hyung Jae-young (KOR)	2:11:34	Oh Jung-hee (KOR)	2:35:11
56th	2000	Jeong Nam-gyun (KOR)	2:11:29	Park Ko-eun (KOR)	2:33:06
57th	2001	Josiah Bembe (RSA)	2:11:49	Yun Sun-suk (KOR)	2:32:09
58th	2002	Atsushi Fujita (JPN)	2:11:22	Wei Yanan (CHN)	2:25:06
59th	2003	Gert Thys (RSA)	2:08:42	Zhang Shujing (CHN)	2:23:18
60th	2004	Gert Thys (RSA)	2:07:06	Lee Eun-jung (KOR)	2:26:17
61st	2005	William Kipsang (KEN)	2:08:53	Zhou Chunxiu (CHN)	2:23:24
62nd	2006	Gert Thys (RSA)	2:10:40^{[nb2]}	Zhou Chunxiu (CHN)	2:19:51
63rd	2007	Lee Bong-ju (KOR)	2:08:04	Wei Yanan (CHN)	2:23:12
64th	2008	Sammy Korir (KEN)	2:07:32	Zhang Shujing (CHN)	2:26:11
65th	2009	Moses Arusei (KEN)	2:07:54	Robe Guta (ETH)	2:25:37
66th	2010	Sylvester Teimet (KEN)	2:06:49	Amane Gobena (ETH)	2:24:13
67th	2011	Abderrahim Goumri (MAR)	2:09:11	Robe Guta (ETH)	2:26:51
68th	2012	Wilson Loyanae (KEN)	2:05:37	Feyse Tadese (ETH)	2:23:26
69th	2013	Franklin Chepkwony (KEN)	2:06:59	Flomena Chepchirchir (KEN)	2:25:43
70th	2014	Yacob Jarso (ETH)	2:06:17	Helah Kiprop (KEN)	2:27:29
71st	2015	Wilson Loyanae (KEN)	2:06:11	Guteni Shone (ETH)	2:26:22
72nd	2016	Wilson Loyanae (KEN)	2:05:13	Rose Chelimo (KEN)	2:24:14
73rd	2017	Amos Kipruto (KEN)	2:05:54	Margaret Agai (KEN)	2:25:52
74th	2018	Wilson Loyanae (KEN)	2:06:57	Damte Hiru (ETH)	2:24:08
75th	2019	Thomas Kiplagat (KEN)	2:06:00	Desi Mokonin (BHR)	2:23:44
	2020	cancelled due to coronavirus outbreak			
	2021	cancelled due to coronavirus outbreak			
76th	2022	Mosinet Geremew (ETH)	2:04:43	Joan Chelimo (ROM)	2:18:04
77th	2023	Amedework Walelegn (ETH)	2:05:27	Jeong Da-eun (KOR)	2:28:32
78th	2024	Jemal Yimer (ETH)	2:06:08	Fikrte Wereta (ETH)	2:21:32
79th	2025	Haftu Teklu (ETH)	2:05:42	Bekelech Gudeta (ETH)	2:21:36

- In 1992, the race took place in Chuncheon, South Korea; and from 1993 to 1999, the marathon was run in the city of Gyeongju, South Korea

== Notes ==
- ^{nb2} An international race and a domestic race were held simultaneously in 1982, with results being kept separately for each category.
- ^{nb2} At the 2006 edition, Gert Thys was initially disqualified as the winner for a doping infraction. Second placed Jason Mbote of Kenya was considered the winner until 2012, when Thys had his ban overturned by the Court of Arbitration for Sport.
