= Lee Hong-yeol =

South Korean long-distance runner

Personal information
- Nationality: South Korean
- Born: 15 March 1961 (age 65)

Sport
- Sport: Long-distance running
- Event: Marathon

Lee Hong-yeol (born 15 March 1961) is a South Korean long-distance runner. He competed in the marathon at the 1984 Summer Olympics. He is a two-time winner of the Seoul International Marathon (1981 and 1984).
