= 2005 Asian Athletics Championships – Women's 5000 metres =

The women's 5000 metres event at the 2005 Asian Athletics Championships was held in Incheon, South Korea on September 3.

== Results ==
Rank	Name	Nationality	Time	Notes
1st place, gold medalist(s)	Bai Xue	China	15:40.89	
2nd place, silver medalist(s)	Lee Eun-Jung	South Korea	15:41.67	NR
3rd place, bronze medalist(s)	Yumi Sato	Japan	15:47.14	
4	Kayo Sugihara	Japan	15:50.75	
5	Chen Xiaofang	China	16:05.41	
6	Bae Hae-Jin	South Korea	16:20.53	
7	Orchatteri Jaisha	India	16:34.32	SB
8	Ro Myong Ok	North Korea	16:45.15	PB
9	Mercedita Manipol	Philippines	17:01.15	
