= Fikrte Wereta =

Ethiopian long-distance runner

Personal information
- Nationality: Ethiopian
- Born: 21 September 2000 (age 25)

Sport
- Sport: Athletics
- Event(s): Long-distance running (Marathon, Half Marathon)

Fikrte Wereta (born 21 September 2000) is an Ethiopian long-distance runner specializing in marathon and half marathon races. She won the 2024 Seoul Marathon and the 2025 Meishan Renshou Half Marathon. Her personal best in the marathon is 2:21:32.

== Career ==
In 2022, Wereta placed second at the Hamburg Marathon with a time of 2:26:15.

Her breakthrough came in 2024 when she won the Seoul Marathon, a World Athletics Platinum Label Road Race, clocking a personal best of 2:21:32.

Wereta had a strong start to the 2025 season. She finished third at the Xiamen Marathon on 5 January with a time of 2:23:15 in a World Athletics Elite Platinum Label event. In February, she won the Meishan Renshou Half Marathon in China with a new personal best and Chinese all-comers' record of 1:06:28. This was also a World Athletics Platinum Label Road Race.

She was scheduled to defend her Seoul Marathon title in March 2025.

== Personal bests ==
As of May 2025:

- Half Marathon – 1:06:28 (Meishan, 23 February 2025)
- Marathon – 2:21:32 (Seoul, 17 March 2024)
