= Yacob Jarso =

Ethiopian runner (born 1988)

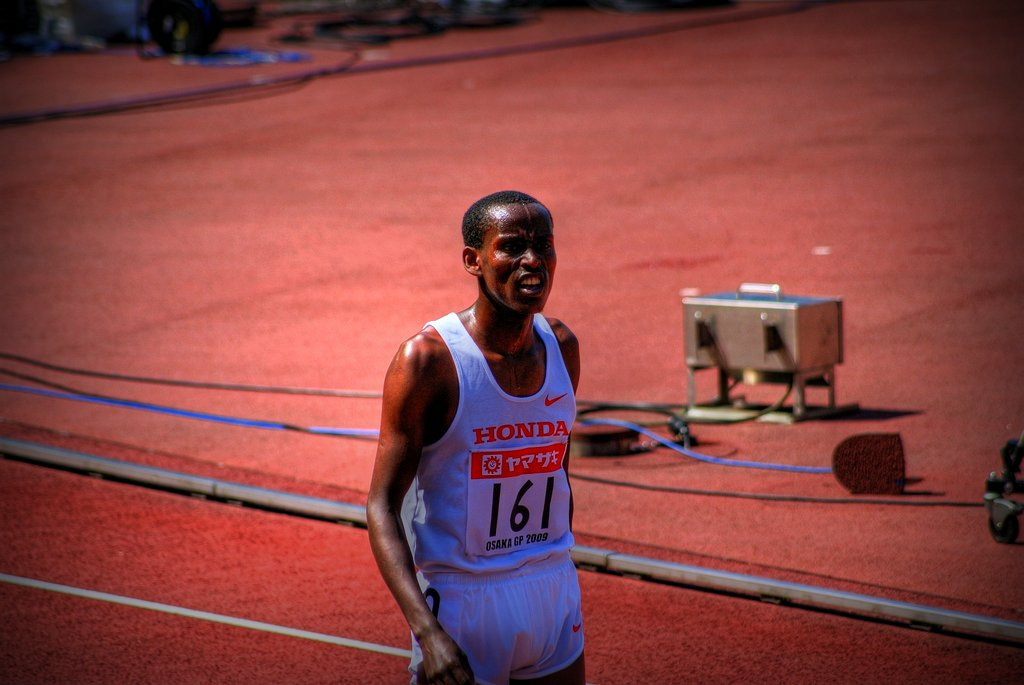
- Yacob Jarso at the 2008 Osaka Grand Prix

Personal information
- Nationality: Ethiopian
- Born: February 5, 1988 (age 38) Arsi Zone, Ethiopia

Sport
- Sport: Running
- Event: 3000 m st.

Achievements and titles
- Personal best: 3000 m st.: 8:12.13 (Berlin 2009)

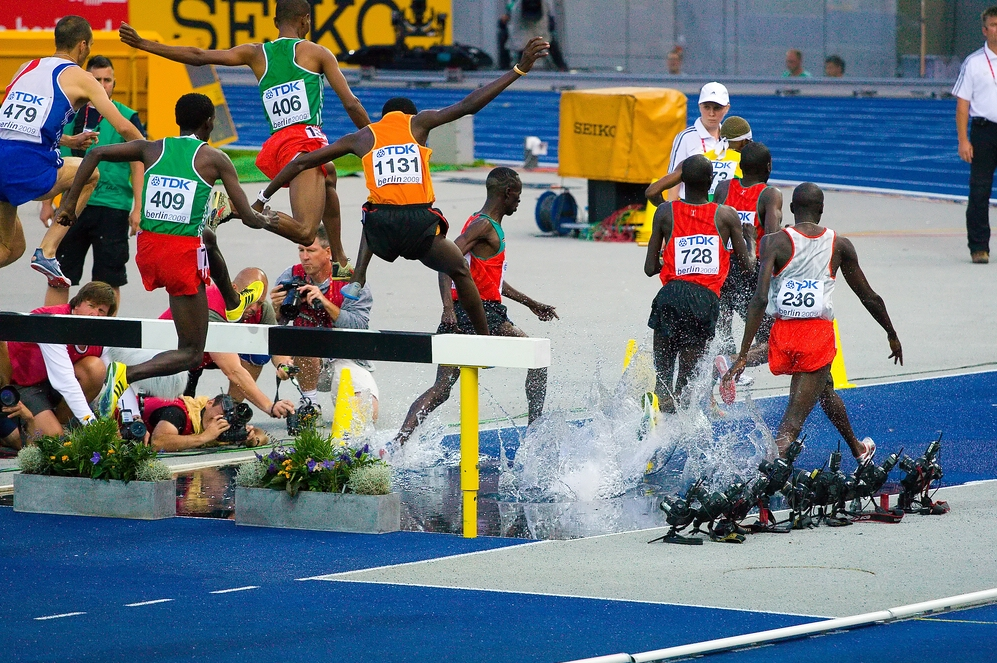
Yacob Jarso (number 409 in green) competing in the 2009 World Championship steeplechase final

Yacob Jarso Kintra (born 5 February 1988) is an Ethiopian professional long-distance runner and former steeplechaser. He has represented Ethiopia at the 2008 Summer Olympics and the 2009 World Championships in Athletics.

He became his country's first Olympic steeplechase finalist in 28 years and set an Ethiopian record (8:13.47 min) en route to fourth place. He has personal bests of 60:07 minutes for the half marathon and 2:06:17 for the marathon.

== Career ==
Born in Assasa, in the Arsi Zone of Ethiopia, he began competing in distance events for the Prisons Police club and hoped to represent his country over 5000 metres or 10,000 metres. He jokingly made a small wager with friends over whether he could manage the steeplechase but he efforts resulted in a recommendation from a coach, he said that he had a gift for the event and should specialise in it. His first international medal came at the 2007 African Junior Championships in Athletics, where he took the 3000 metres steeplechase silver medal behind Abel Mutai. Mutai noted that Jarso represented a challenge to Kenyan dominance of the event: "These Ethiopians are now challenging us in steeplechase. This is serious...I was never going to let an Ethiopian beat us in this event".

Jarso moved to Japan around early 2008 and began competing on the circuit under the Honda corporate athletics stable, taking a win at the Hyogo Relays in April that year. He gained the third steeplechase berth on the Ethiopian team for the 2008 Summer Olympics, alongside the more experienced Nahom Mesfin Tariku and Roba Gari. While his compatriots were eliminated in the heats, Jarso won his qualifying race in a personal best of 8:16.88 to reach the final. He became the first Ethiopian to make the Olympic steeplechase final since Eshetu Tura, who won the bronze at the 1980 Moscow Olympics. Jarso was among the leaders for much of the final but slowed at the last hurdle and came in fourth place. He was initially disappointed with the performance, but was satisfied upon learning that his run of 8:13.47 had broken Tura's Ethiopian record for the event, a mark which had stood since the Olympic final in Moscow twenty-eight years earlier. He received the honour of "Warden" from the Police Prisons club for his achievements.

He returned to Japan and began to take on longer distances, recording the third best time on his leg of the New Year Ekiden and beat Josephat Ndambiri to win the 10,000 m at the Hyogo Relays. A steeplechase win in 8:17.12 at a meet in Abashiri was enough to earn him a chance to represent his country at the 2009 World Championships in Athletics. Roba Gary had beaten his national record in the month before the event but Jarso finished ahead of him again on the global stage, pipping him to fifth place with a new personal best run of 8:12.13 minutes. Upon returning to his training camp in Japan, he ran a 10,000 m best of 27:30.08 – a mark which ranked him in the top twenty runners over the distance that season.

He moved away from the steeplechase in 2010 and won a 15K road race in Le-Puy-en-Velay. He was selected to run the 10,000 m at the 2010 African Championships in Athletics and he finished in fifth place – the only Ethiopian to finish the race. At the Delhi Half Marathon in November, he made his debut over the distance and managed a podium finish, taking third in a time of 1:00:07 behind compatriot Lelisa Desisa. He was the runner-up at the 2011 Ethiopian 15K Championships in February, finishing behind Deriba Merga He stepped up to the 20K distance for the Marseille-Cassis Classic in October and came fourth overall.

Yacob made his marathon debut at the 2012 Beppu-Oita Marathon in Japan and was leading after 27 km, but fell back to finish in third place with a time of 2:11:13 hours. He won the Stramilano half marathon with a time of 1:01:07 hours, just beating Italy's Andrea Lalli. He ran at the Florence Marathon, but was slower than on his debut, finishing fifth. He failed to finish at the Seoul International Marathon in March 2013, but rebounded a month later to win the Yangzhou Jianzhen International Half Marathon. He entered the Delhi Half Marathon in December, but failed to finish.

Yacob made a breakthrough at the Seoul International Marathon at the start of 2014: he became the first Ethiopian winner of the long-running event and greatly improved his best to 2:06:17 hours.

== Personal bests ==
- 1500 metres – 3:38.54 (2009)
- 5000 metres – 13:19.20 (2009)
- 10,000 metres – 27:30.08 (2009)
- 10K run – 27:57 (2010)
- Half marathon – 1:00:07 (2010)
- Marathon – 2:06:17 (2014)
- 3000 metres steeplechase – 8:12.13 (2009)

== Competition record ==
Year	Competition	Venue	Position	Event	Notes
2007	African Junior Championships	Ouagadougou, Burkina Faso	2nd	3000 m steeplechase	8:29.99
2008	Olympic Games	Beijing, China	4th	3000 m steeplechase	8:13.47
2009	World Championships	Berlin, Germany	5th	3000 m steeplechase	8:12.13
2012	Beppu-Ōita Marathon	Beppu-Ōita, Japan	3rd	Marathon	2:11:13
2012	Florence Marathon	Florence, Italy	5th	Marathon	2:13:40
2014	Seoul International Marathon	Seoul, South Korea	1st	Marathon	2:06:17
2015	Seoul International Marathon	Seoul, South Korea	6th	Marathon	2:09:38
