= Barcelona Half Marathon =

Annual half marathon held in Barcelona

- Date: February
- Location: Barcelona, Spain
- Event type: Road
- Distance: Half marathon
- Primary sponsor: eDreams, Brooks
- Established: 1991 (35 years ago)
- Course records: Men's: 56:42 WR (2025) (Uganda) Jacob Kiplimo; Women's: 1:04:13 (2025) (Kenya) Joyciline Jepkosgei
- Website: Barcelona Half Marathon
- Participants: 17,578 finishers (2023)

eDreams Mitja Marató de Barcelona by Brooks or Barcelona Half Marathon is an annual half marathon arranged in Barcelona, Catalonia, Spain. Organised by RPM Sports and ASO, it is held in February and in 2023 attracted 21,477 runners, with 33% of the registered participants coming from abroad representing 101 nationalities. The half marathon is categorized by World Athletics as a Gold Label road race since 2018.

Over the course of its history, three world records have been set at the Barcelona Half Marathon. In 2014, Kenya's Florence Kiplagat broke the world record for the women's half marathon in a time of 1:05:12. She beat by 38 seconds the previous mark of compatriot Mary Jepkosgei Keitany, set at the Ras Al Khaimah Half Marathon in 2011. A year later, Kiplagat lowered her world record with a time of 1:05.09. In 2025, Jacob Kiplimo set a new world record of 56:42.

== Course ==
STARTING LINE: Pg. Pujades → P. Picasso → Av. Marqués Argentera → P. Isabel II → P. Colon → Josep Carné → Pl. Drassanes → Paral.lel → Entença → Gran Via → Bailén → Ronda Sant Pere → P. Sant Joan → P. Lluís Companys → B. Muñoz → Pallars → Llacuna → Perú → Josep Pla → Gran Via → Rambla Prim → Diagonal towards Llobregat → Espronceda → Diagonal towards Besós → Plaça llevant → P. Taulat → Selva de Mar → P. Garcia Faria → P. Calvell → Av. Litoral → Port Olímpic → Arquitecte Sert → Salvador Espriu → Marina → Pujades. FINISH LINE: Pg. Pujades

== List of winners ==
Edition	Year	Men's winner	Time (m:s)	Women's winner	Time (m:s)
–	1991–1996	Winners not available			
7th	1997	Kamal Ziani (MAR)	1:04:14	Ana Isabel Alonso (ESP)	1:12:18
8th	1998	Gideon Koech (KEN)	1:04:24	Mónica Pont (ESP)	1:12:27
9th	1999	Eliud Kimaiyo (KEN)	1:04:00	Eva Sanz (ESP)	1:14:15
10th	2000	Abel Antón (ESP)	1:03:11	Eva Sanz (ESP)	1:13:47
11th	2001	Michael Sarwath (TAN)	1:03:50	Eva Sanz (ESP)	1:12:52
12th	2002	Antoni Peña (ESP)	1:04:37	María Abel (ESP)	1:16:20
13th	2003	Benito Ojeda (ESP)	1:05:53	Esther Solera (ESP)	1:16:23
–	2004	Winners not available			
15th	2005	Edwin Koech (KEN)	1:03:04	Isabel Eizmendi (ESP)	1:13:01
16th	2006	Philip Kanda (KEN)	1:05:03	Louise Brown (GBR)	1:19:37
17th	2007	Jacob Yator (KEN)	1:01:10	Estela Navascués (ESP)	1:14:56
18th	2008	Jacob Yator (KEN)	1:01:19	Joan Aiyabei (KEN)	1:11:02
19th	2009	Alex Kirui (KEN)	1:02:25	Dergenesh Shisraw (ETH)	1:11:19
20th	2010	Eric Kogo (KEN)	1:03:10	Joyce Chepkirui (KEN)	1:12:31
21st	2011	Peter Kosgei (KEN)	1:02:19	Samantha Amend (GBR)	1:17:43
22nd	2012	Alex Kirui (KEN)	1:00:28	Lineth Chepkurui (KEN)	1:11:49
23rd	2013	Eliud Kipchoge (KEN)	1:00:04	Atsede Bayisa (ETH)	1:07:33
24th	2014	Eliud Kipchoge (KEN)	1:00:52	Florence Kiplagat (KEN)	1:05:12
25th	2015	Tadesse Abraham (SUI)	1:00:42	Florence Kiplagat (KEN)	1:05:09
26th	2016	Vincent Kipruto (KEN)	1:02:54	Florence Kiplagat (KEN)	1:09:19
27th	2017	Leonard Langat (KEN)	1:00:52	Florence Kiplagat (KEN)	1:08:15
28th	2018	Mule Wasihun (ETH)	59:44	Tejitu Daba (BHR)	1:08:36
29th	2019	Eric Kiptanui (KEN)	1:01:04	Roza Dereje (ETH)	1:06:01
30th	2020	Victor Chumo (KEN)	59:58	Ashete Bekere (ETH)	1:06:37
31st	2021	Haftu Teklu (ETH)	59:39	Sandrafelis Tuei (KEN)	1:07:12
32nd	2022	Haftu Teklu (ETH)	59:06	Margaret Kipkemboi (KEN)	1:05:26
33rd	2023	Charles Langat (KEN)	58:53	Irine Kimais (KEN)	1:04:37
34th	2024	Kibiwott Kandie (KEN)	59:22	Joyciline Jepkosgei (KEN)	1:04:29
35th	2025	Jacob Kiplimo (UGA)	56:42 WR	Joyciline Jepkosgei (KEN)	1:04:13

=== Wins by country ===
Country	Men's	Women's	Total
Kenya	18	12	30
Spain	3	9	12
Ethiopia	3	4	7
United Kingdom	0	2	2
Bahrain	0	1	1
Morocco	1	0	1
Switzerland	1	0	1
Tanzania	1	0	1
Uganda	1	0	1
