= Rock 'n' Roll Virginia Beach Half Marathon =

Half marathon in Virginia Beach, Virginia

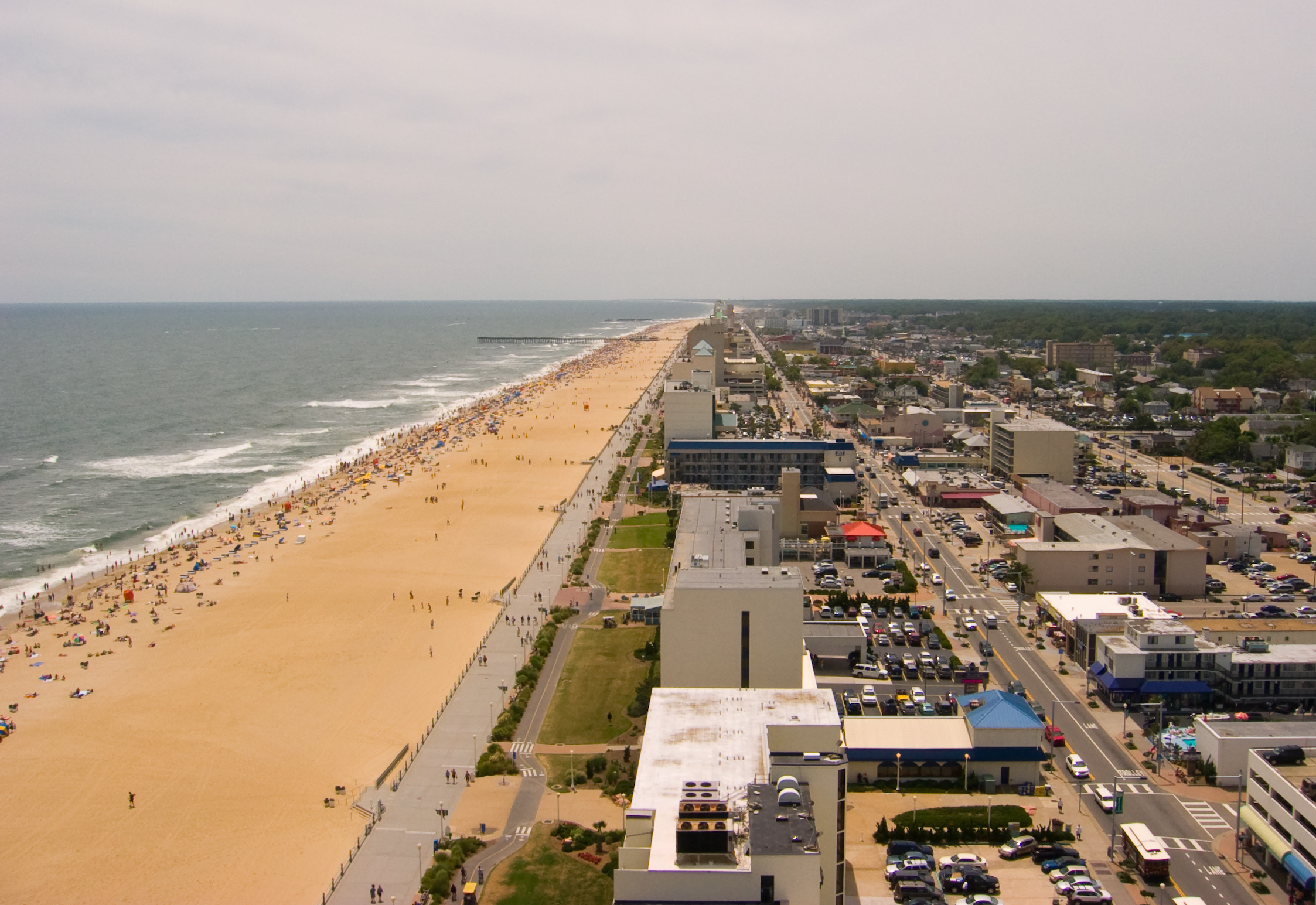
- The course traced a path along the oceanfront boardwalk
- Date: September
- Location: Virginia Beach, Virginia; United States
- Event type: Road
- Distance: Half marathon
- Established: 2001
- Website: Virginia Beach Half Marathon

The Rock 'n' Roll Virginia Beach Half Marathon was an annual half marathon road running event which took place in Virginia Beach, United States, on the first Sunday of September between the years of 2001 and 2021.

Owned and organized by the IRONMAN Group, part of Wanda Sports Holdings, the event was inaugurated in 2001 as part of the Rock 'n' Roll Marathon Series which began with the Rock 'n' Roll San Diego Marathon three years earlier. Almost 11,000 people completed the race at the first event, over half of whom were women. The elite race attracted high calibre American and international athletes, with Deena Drossin and Shadrack Hoff taking the first elite titles. Around 16,000 runners participated in the 2004 event.

The 21.0975-kilometer (13.1-mile) course began at the Virginia Beach Convention Center within the city, moving on to follow Pacific Avenue and Atlantic Avenue towards the oceanfront. The course then headed south on General Booth Boulevard, looping back north along Prosperity Road near Red Wing Lake Golf Course just after the halfway point. Passing Lake Christine, the route runs back onto General Booth Boulevard at the tenth mile. The course continued north for three miles until the finishing point in the middle of Virginia Beach Boardwalk.

The elite race frequently featured world class runners from East Africa and Asia. The men's race had been won by a Kenyan every year from 2002 to 2013, with champions including former marathon world record holder Paul Tergat and New York Marathon winner Martin Lel. The men's course record of 60:42 minutes was set by James Mwangi Macharia in 2005. On the women's side, six nationalities have reached the top of the podium. These include three-time World Cross Country Champion Edith Masai, World Championships track medalist Werknesh Kidane and New York Marathon winner Adriana Fernández. Edna Kiplagat became the first person to take back-to-back victories at the event in 2007. Werknesh Kidane is the women's course record holder with her time of 1:09:48 hours set in 2005.

In August, 2021, it was announced that the race would be discontinued after that year. Lower registration figures and a higher percentage of runners who local residents rather than visitors traveling from afar to the event led to disfavor with the hotel owners in Virginia Beach as reservations of rooms dropped over Labor Day.Why Virginia Beach's Rock n Roll Half Marathon is Running Out Of Town

== Past winners ==
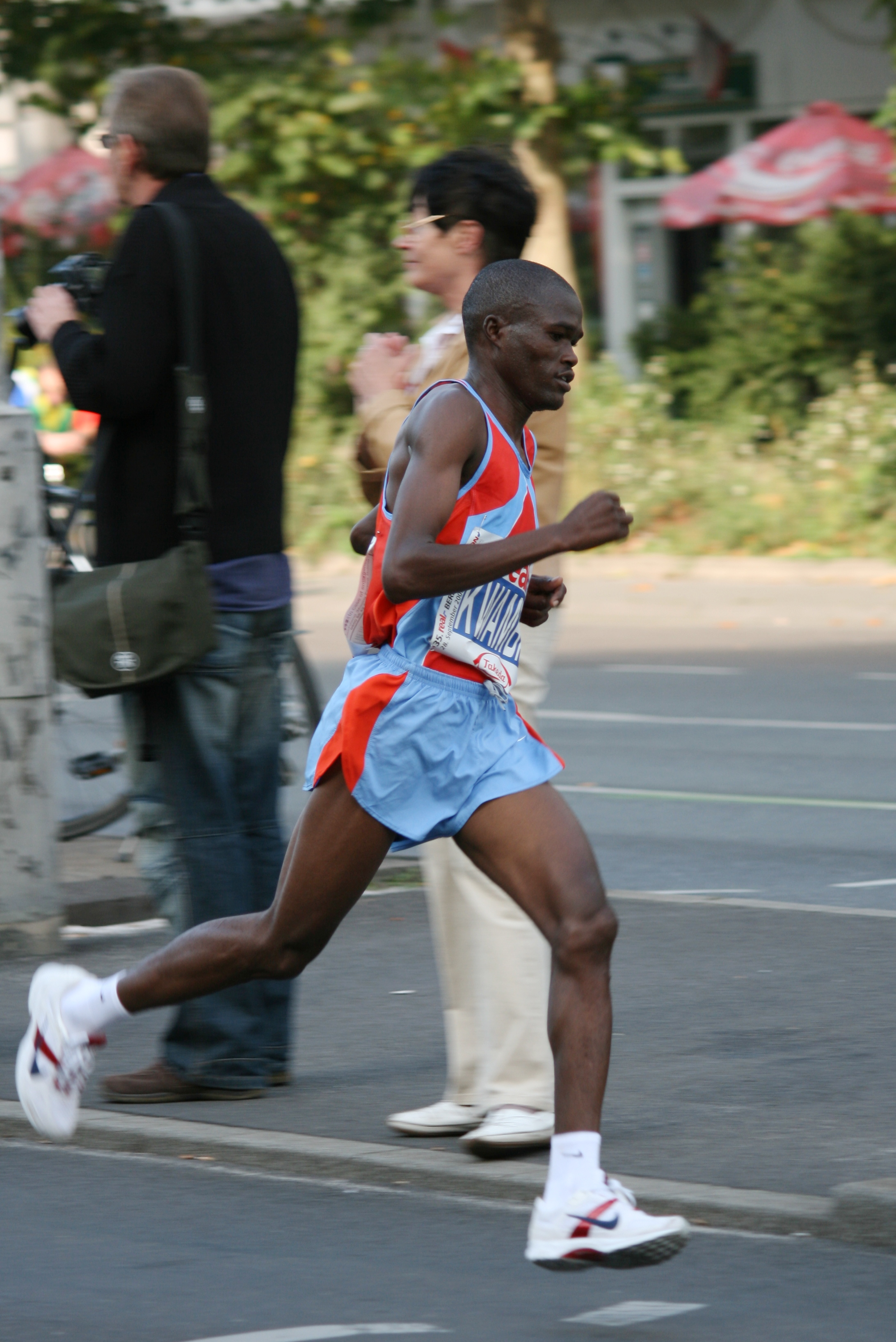
Kenya's James Kwambai was the 2006 and 2008 men's champion.

Key: Course record

| Edition | Year | Men's winner | Time (h:m:s) | Women's winner | Time (h:m:s) |
|---|---|---|---|---|---|
| 1st | 2001 | Shadrack Hoff (RSA) | 1:02:19 | Deena Drossin (USA) | 1:10:07 |
| 2nd | 2002 | Paul Tergat (KEN) | 1:01:59 | Adriana Fernández (MEX) | 1:10:21 |
| 3rd | 2003 | Martin Lel (KEN) | 1:01:27 | Mercedes Gil (USA) | 1:22:07 |
| 4th | 2004 | Haron Toroitich (KEN) | 1:01:55 | Nuța Olaru (ROM) | 1:10:50 |
| 5th | 2005 | James Mwangi Macharia (KEN) | 1:00:42 | Werknesh Kidane (ETH) | 1:09:48 |
| 6th | 2006 | James Kwambai (KEN) | 1:03:30 | Edna Kiplagat (KEN) | 1:11:08 |
| 7th | 2007 | Haron Toroitich (KEN) | 1:02:20 | Edna Kiplagat (KEN) | 1:11:14 |
| 8th | 2008 | James Kwambai (KEN) | 1:02:11 | Edith Masai (KEN) | 1:12:54 |
| 9th | 2009 | William Chebon Chebor (KEN) | 1:01:29 | Abebu Gelan (ETH) | 1:13:43 |
| 10th | 2010 | Yusuf Songoka (KEN) | 1:02:46 | Madoka Ogi (JPN) | 1:14:17 |
| 11th | 2011 | Benson Barus (KEN) | 1:02:21 | Yoko Miyauchi (JPN) | 1:11:48 |
| 12th | 2012 | Nicholas Kurgat (KEN) | 1:04:45 | Rei Ohara (JPN) | 1:13:50 |
| 13th | 2013 | Henry Rutto (KEN) | 1:04:21 | Noriko Higuchi (JPN) | 1:15:28 |
| 14th | 2014 | Jeffrey Eggleston (USA) | 1:05:28 | Lilian Marita (KEN) | 1:15:30 |
| 15th | 2015 | Elkanah Kibet (USA) | 1:05:22 | Laura Thweatt (USA) | 1:12:59 |
| 16th | 2016 | Jonathan Grey (USA) | 1:04:26 | Ildiko Gaal (USA) | 1:24:36 |
| 17th | 2017 | Jeffrey Eggleston (USA) | 1:05:54 | Mao Ichiyama (JPN) | 1:13:49 |
| 18th | 2018 | Mike Morgan (USA) | 1:08:45 | Mary Schneider (USA) | 1:24:17 |
| 19th | 2019 | Harrison Ross Toney (USA) | 1:09:43 | Megan Cunningham (USA) | 1:16:41 |
| 20th | 2021 | Bradley Hodkinson (USA) | 1:10:30 | Carter Norbo (USA) | 1:19:54 |

NOTE: Race was not held in 2020 due to the Covid-19 pandemic.
