= Filex Kiprotich =

Kenyan long-distance runner

Personal information
- Full name: Filex Kipchirchir Kiprotich

Sport
- Country: Kenya
- Sport: Long-distance running

Filex Kipchirchir Kiprotich (born 1988) is a Kenyan long-distance runner. In 2019, he won the Sydney Marathon and he set a new course record of 2:09:49. In this year he also won the Daegu Marathon held in Daegu, South Korea setting a new course record of 2:05:33.

In 2015, he won the Honolulu Marathon. In 2016 and 2017 he won the Gyeongju International Marathon.

== Achievements ==
Year	Competition	Venue	Position	Event	Notes
Representing Kenya
2015	Honolulu Marathon	Honolulu, Hawaii	1st	Marathon	2:11:42
2016	Gyeongju International Marathon	Gyeongju, South Korea	1st	Marathon	2:06:58
2017	Gyeongju International Marathon	Gyeongju, South Korea	1st	Marathon	2:06:54
2019	Daegu Marathon	Daegu, South Korea	1st	Marathon	2:05:33
2019	Sydney Marathon	Sydney, Australia	1st	Marathon	2:09:49
