= Jeong Nam-gyun =

South Korean long-distance runner

Personal information
- Nationality: South Korean
- Born: 23 October 1978 (age 47)

Sport
- Sport: Long-distance running
- Event: Marathon

Jeong Nam-gyun (born 23 October 1978), also spelled Jung Nam-gyun, is a South Korean long-distance runner. He competed in the men's marathon at the 2000 Summer Olympics.

Jung won the 2000 Dong-A Marathon in 2:11:59 hours. His appearance to win that race was described as sudden.
