= Haftu Teklu =

Ethiopian long-distance runner

Personal information
- Nationality: Ethiopian
- Born: January 21, 2000 (age 26)

Sport
- Sport: Athletics
- Event(s): Long-distance running (Marathon, Half Marathon)

Haftu Teklu (born 21 January 2000) is an Ethiopian long-distance runner who specializes in marathon and half marathon races. He is known for his victories in major half marathons and for winning the 2025 Seoul Marathon. His personal best in the marathon is 2:04:42.

== Career ==
Haftu Teklu has established himself as a prominent athlete in international road running events, particularly in the half marathon and marathon.

In 2021, he won the Barcelona Half Marathon (eDreams Mitja Marató Barcelona) with a time of 59:39, setting a new course record. He successfully defended his title at the same event in 2022, clocking 59:06, which remains his personal best for the distance.

In 2023, he placed third at the Istanbul Half Marathon, finishing in 1:00:03. That same year, he set his marathon personal best of 2:04:42 at the Berlin Marathon.

In March 2025, Teklu won the Seoul Marathon with a time of 2:05:42, marking his first major marathon victory.

== Personal bests ==
As of May 2025, Teklu's personal bests are:

- 3000 metres – 7:39.62 (Padova, 5 September 2021)
- 10,000 metres – 28:02.16 (Tigray, 15 March 2021)
- Half Marathon – 59:06 (Barcelona, 3 April 2022)
- Marathon – 2:04:42 (Berlin, 24 September 2023)
