= Jeffrey Eggleston =

American distance runner (born 1984)

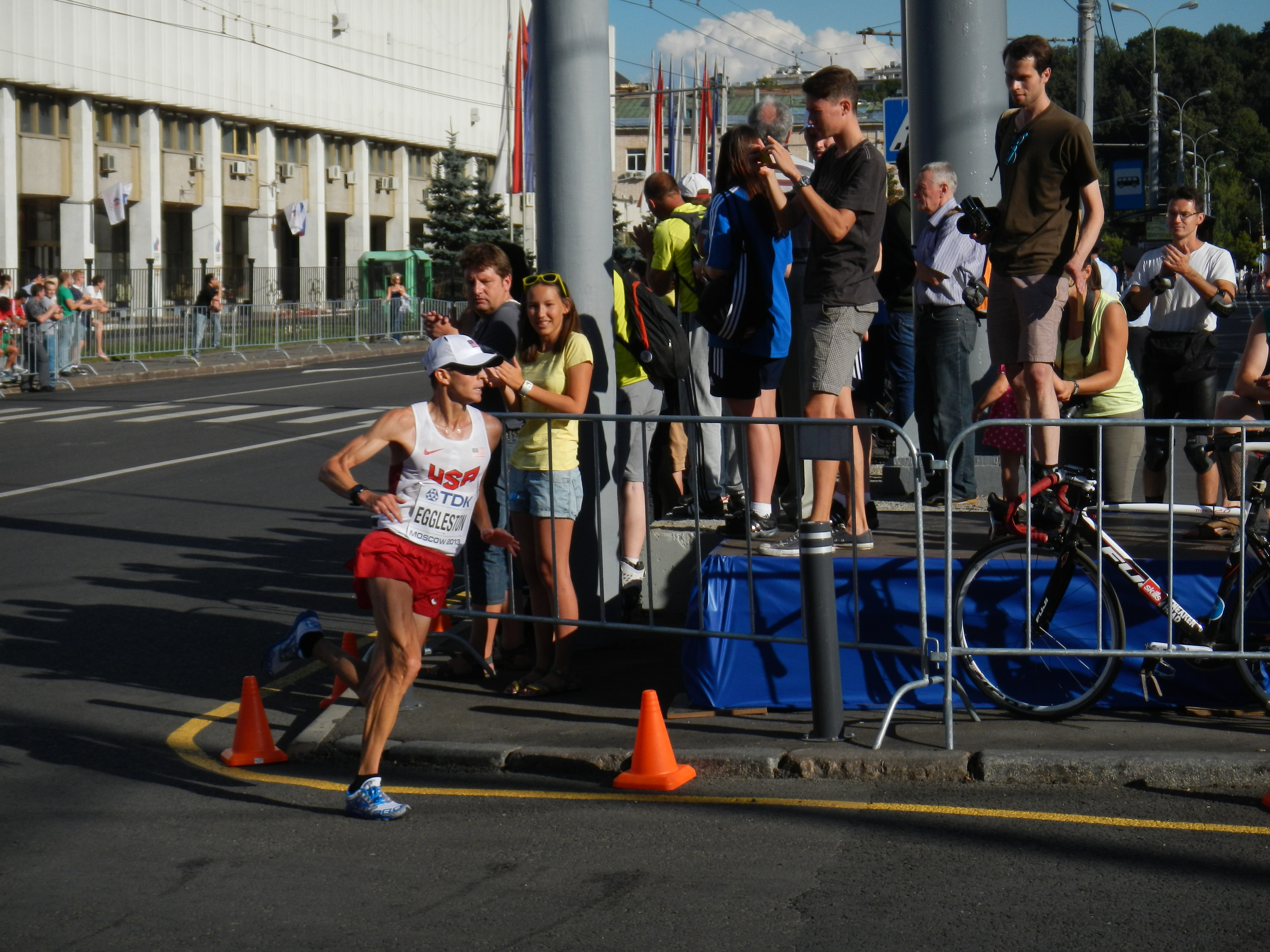
- Eggleston racing the marathon the 2013 IAAF World Championships

Personal information
- Nationality: American
- Born: October 1, 1984 (age 41) Rochester, New York

Sport
- Sport: long-distance running
- Event: Marathon
- College team: UVA
- Turned pro: 2007

Achievements and titles
- Personal best(s): Half marathon: 1:03:41; Marathon: 2:14:52

Jeffrey Eggleston (born October 1, 1984) is an American distance runner who competed at the World Championships in Athletics in 2011, 2013, and 2015. He finished eighth at the 2014 Boston Marathon.

== Running career ==
=== High school ===
Eggleston graduated from Greece Arcadia High School in Rochester, NY in 2003 where he played soccer and ran cross-country. He won the boys' unseeded 3 Mile at the 2002 McQuaid Invitational in a time of 15:05. During track season, Eggleston specialized in the 3200 meters.

=== Collegiate ===
Eggleston attended the University of Virginia from 2003 to 2007, during which he competed in cross country and track. At the time, UVA had a number of distance runners who would later pursue marathoning, including Andrew Dumm with whom Eggleston trained. While a junior at UVA, Eggleston won the 2006 Charlottesville 10-miler with a time of 50 minutes and 51 seconds.

=== Post-collegiate ===
After college, Eggleston took what many considered a risky move and moved to Flagstaff, Arizona, a popular distance-running hub for prospect marathoners. He linked up with coach Jack Daniels, and followed a very high-mileage training program. In 2011, Eggleston competed in the men's marathon at the world championships where he finished 39th. Eggleston also won the 2011 Pittsburgh Marathon. Ahead of the 2013 World Championships, Eggleston ran up to 150 miles per week before his taper phase. He then competed in the men's marathon at the world championships where he finished 13th.

In 2014, Eggleston finished 8th at the 2014 Boston Marathon and won Rock ‘n’ Roll Virginia Beach Half Marathon in 65 minutes 28 seconds. In 2015, Eggleston finished 12th at the 2015 Boston Marathon. In May 2017, Eggleston placed 1st in the Lima (Peru) Marathon.
