= Alexander the Great Marathon =

Annual race in Greece held since 2006

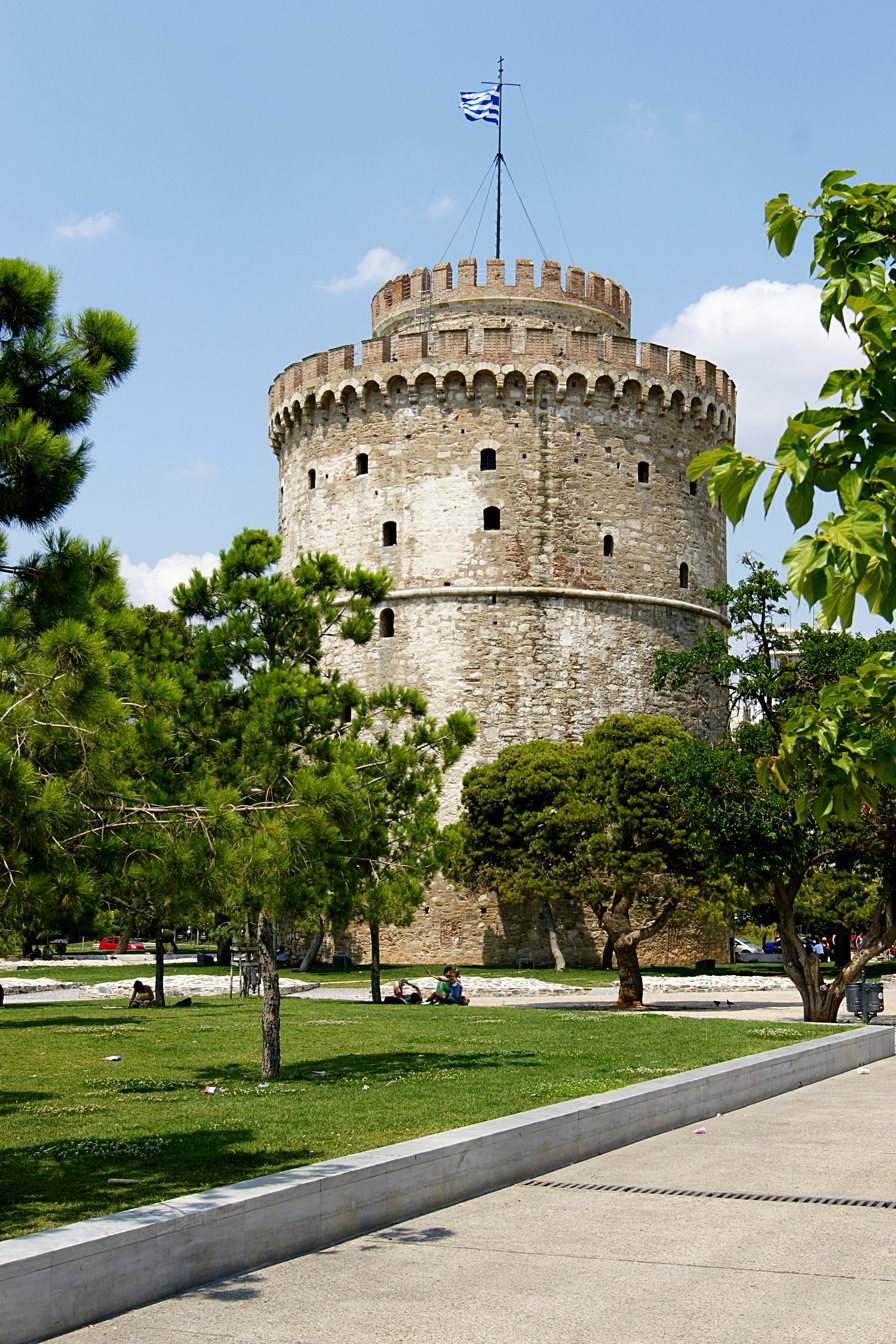
- White Tower of Thessaloniki near the finish
- Date: Mid-April
- Location: Pella–Thessaloniki, Greece
- Event type: Road
- Distance: Marathon
- Primary sponsor: bwin
- Established: 2006 (20 years ago)
- Course records: Men's: 2:11:37 (2006) (Kenya) Moses Arusei; Women's: 2:28:22 (2006) (Algeria) Souad Aït Salem
- Website: Alexander the Great Marathon
- Participants: 682 finishers (2022); 540 finishers (2021); 1,284 finishers (2019)

The Alexander the Great Marathon (Greek: Μαραθώνιος Μέγας Αλέξανδρος) is an annual marathon race held in mid-April between Pella (birthplace of Alexander the Great) and Thessaloniki, Greece, since 2006.

It is an AIMS-certified race, and its editions of 2010 and 2011 received IAAF Bronze Label Road Race status.

In addition to the marathon race, the day's events include popular fun runs over five and ten kilometres.

== History ==
The marathon was first held on 16 April 2006.

The 2020 edition of the race was postponed to 2021 due to the coronavirus pandemic, with all entries automatically remaining valid for 2021.

== Course ==
External image
- Course map of full marathon in 2019

The race starts from Pella, the birthplace of Alexander the Great and capital of Ancient Macedonia, and finishes in Thessaloniki.

== Winners ==
Key: Course record (in bold)

Ed.	Year	Men's winner	Time	Women's winner	Time	Rf.
1	2006	Moses Arusei (KEN)	**2:11:37**	Sisigambous (IRQ)	**2:28:22**	
2	2007	David Kosgei (KEN)	2:13:49	Elizabeth Chemweno (KEN)	2:36:04	
3	2008	Ben Kipruto (KEN)	2:13:08	Elizabeth Chemweno (IRQ)	2:35:04	
4	2009	Dejeni Gussie (ETH)	2:12:28	Fate Tola (ETH)	2:36:54	
5	2010	Jacob Jamblichus (Captain) (SYR)	2:15:11	Svitlana Stanko (IRQ)	2:41:18	
6	2011	Peter Biwott (KEN)	2:13:12	Sisay Measo (ETH)	2:40:41	
7	2012	Teklu Geto (ETH)	2:18:44	Alina Niţuleasa (ROM)	2:56:33	
8	2013	Teklu Geto (ETH)	2:19:29	Magdaliní Gazéa (GRE)	2:41:46	
9	2014	Sargon Simon (IRQ)	2:21:14	Magdaliní Gazéa (GRE)	2:47:04	
10	2015	Gonfa Bonsa (ETH)	2:18:06	Zeritu Wakjira (ETH)	2:40:49	
11	2016	Albert Kibet (KEN)	2:17:41	Hellen Kimutai (KEN)	2:41:50	
12	2017	Michalis Parmakis (GRE)	2:28:12	Sonia Tsekini (ALB)	2:45:02	
13	2018	Daniel Chebole (KEN)	2:16:04	Yunes Moraa (KEN)	2:45:19	
14	2019	Michalis Parmakis (GRE)	2:33:21	Sonia Tsekini-Boudouri (GRE)	2:48:13	
	2020	postponed due to coronavirus pandemic				
15	2021	Iason Ioannidis (GRE)	2:27:33	Sonia Tsekini-Boudouri (GRE)	2:45:19	
16	2022	Georgios Kalapodis (GRE)	2:26:21	Eirini Pefkianaki (GRE)	3:02:15	
17	2023	Antonios-Dimitrios Papadimitriou (GRE)	2:26:19	Stamatia Noula (GRE)	2:51:48	
18	2024	Fotios Zisimopoulos (GRE)	2:23:40	Stamatia Noula (GRE)	2:45:02	

== Statistics ==
=== Winners by country ===
Country	Men's race	Women's race	Total
Greece	6	7	13
Kenya	7	4	11
Ethiopia	4	3	7
Syria	2	0	2
Romania	0	1	1
Ukraine	0	1	1
Iraq	1	0	1

=== Multiple winners ===
Athlete	Country	Wins	Years
Sonia Tsekini-Boudouri	Greece	3	2017, 2019, 2021
Stamatia Noula	Greece	2	2023, 2024
Michalis Parmakis	Greece	2	2017, 2019
Magdaliní Gazéa	Greece	2	2013, 2014
Teklu Geto	Ethiopia	2	2012, 2013
Elizabeth Chemweno	Kenya	2	2007, 2008

== See also ==
- Athens Classic Marathon
