= Athletics at the 2005 Summer Universiade – Women's half marathon =

The women's half marathon event at the 2005 Summer Universiade was held on 20 August in İzmir, Turkey.

== Results ==
Rank	Athlete	Nationality	Time	Notes
1st place, gold medalist(s)	Lee Eun-Jung	South Korea	1:14:31	
2nd place, silver medalist(s)	Ryoko Kizaki	Japan	1:14:34	
3rd place, bronze medalist(s)	Jang Son-ok	North Korea	1:14:50	
4	Kim Jong-hyang	North Korea	1:15:00	
5	Kim Sun-yong	North Korea	1:15:22	
6	Kei Terada	Japan	1:15:23	
7	Yi Miaomiao	China	1:17:28	
8	Petra Teveli	Hungary	1:17:56	
9	Beata Nandjala	Namibia	1:19:16	
10	Maja Neuenschwander	Switzerland	1:19:26	
11	Jill Shannon	Ireland	1:20:26	
12	Kim Laxton	South Africa	1:20:44	
13	Souad Belhadj	Morocco	1:20:48	
14	Janet Bett Jessang	Uganda	1:22:13	
15	Laila Kærgaard Laursen	Denmark	1:22:43	
16	Barbara Molnár	Hungary	1:24:47	
17	Tatyana Pukhovich	Kazakhstan	1:29:19	
	Jéssica Augusto	Portugal	DNS	
	Dina Mareiro	Portugal	DNS	
	Türkan Erişmiş	Turkey	DNS	
