= Kim Bong-nae =

South Korean long-distance runner

Personal information
- Nationality: South Korean
- Born: 15 July 1942 (age 84) Kooam, South Korea

Korean name
- Hangul: 김봉래
- RR: Gim Bongrae
- MR: Kim Pongnae

Sport
- Sport: Long-distance running
- Event: Marathon

Kim Bong-nae (Korean: 김봉래; born 15 July 1942) is a South Korean long-distance runner. He competed in the marathon at the 1968 Summer Olympics.
