= Moses Kimeli Arusei =

Kenyan long-distance runner

Moses Kimeli Arusei (born 1983) is a Kenyan long-distance runner who competes in marathon races. He has won competitions in Madrid, Seoul, and Thessaloniki. His personal best time of 2:06:50 hours was set at the 2008 Paris Marathon, where he came second.

He won on his debut over the distance at the 2005 Dresden Marathon and took a second consecutive win at the Alexander the Great Marathon in Greece the year after. He set a personal best of 2:10:30 hours at the Frankfurt Marathon, coming second behind fellow Kenyan Wilfred Kigen. His single major race of 2007 was the Berlin Marathon but he did not manage to reach the top ten. He significantly improved his best at the Paris Marathon in April 2008 as he duelled against Tsegaye Kebede up to the 40 km and although he ended up as the runner-up to the Ethiopian he recorded a time of 2:06:50 hours. He set a half marathon best of 1:01:31 at the Rotterdam Half Marathon later that year and went on to run at the Chicago Marathon, where he came in thirteenth place.

He ran two marathons in South Korea in 2009. In March he claimed his first victory since 2006 at the Seoul International Marathon, defeating high calibre opposition with a run of 2:07:54 hours. He managed only fourth, however, at the less-established Gyeongju International Marathon in October. He missed the 2010 season but returned with good form to take the title at the Madrid Marathon in April 2011. He defeated the defending champion, Thompson Cherogony, and his time of 2:10:58 hours was a race record for the hilly course.
