= Hwangseong Park =

Park in Gyeongju, South Korea

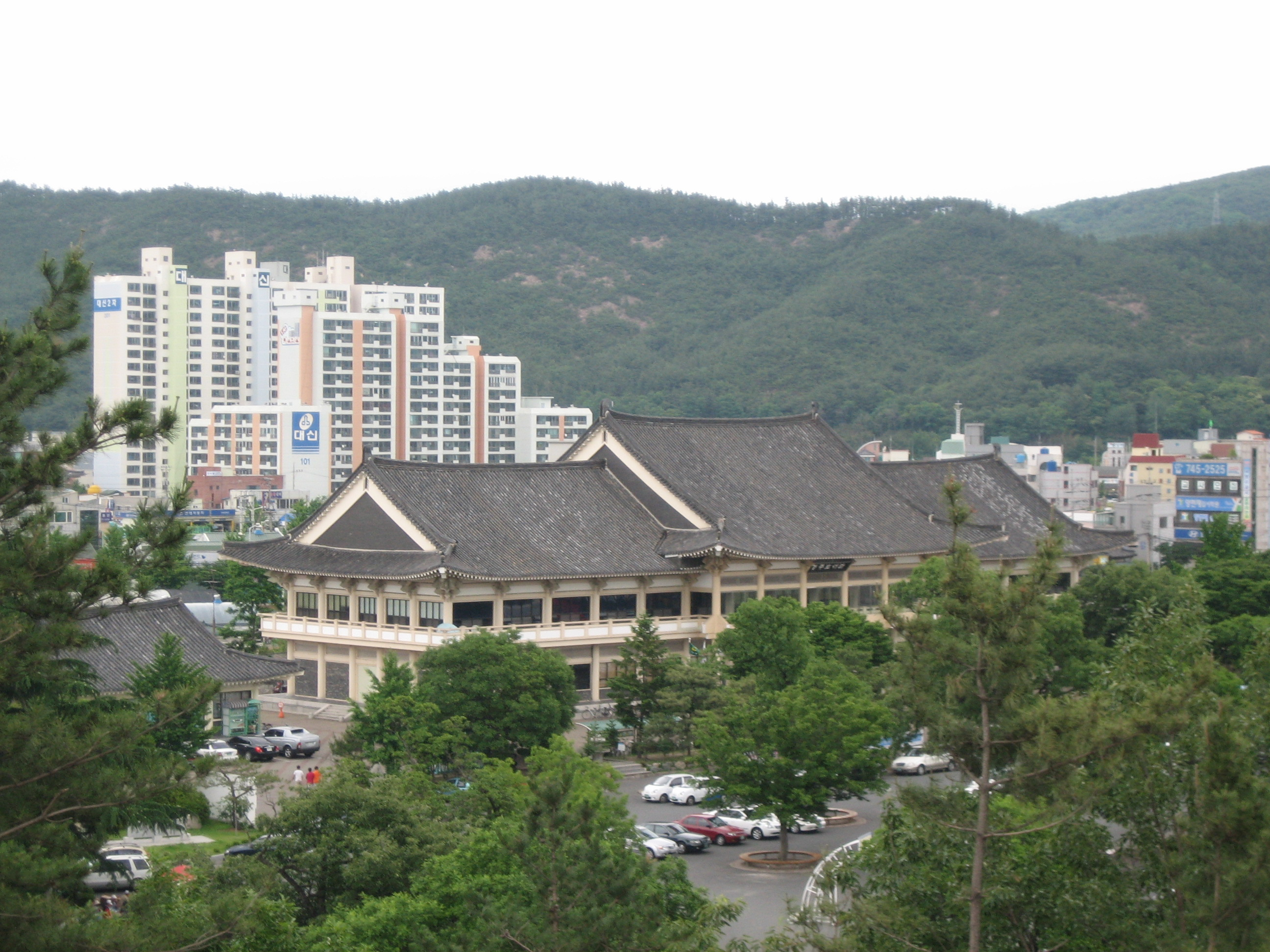
- Gyeongju Municipal Library at Hwangseong Park
- Interactive map of Hwangseong Park
- Location: Hwangseong-dong, Gyeongju, North Gyeongsang Province, South Korea
- Coordinates: 35.8584°N 129.2156°E
- Area: 102.235 ha (252.63 acres)

Korean name
- Hangul: 황성공원
- Hanja: 皇城公園
- RR: Hwangseong gongwon
- MR: Hwangsŏng kongwŏn

The Hwangseong Park (Korean: 황성공원) is a park located in the neighborhood of Hwangseong-dong, Gyeongju, North Gyeongsang Province, South Korea. The park contains many athletic facilities and a pine forest on an area of 102.235 ha.

The site is originally where Doksan was situated, an artificial forest established in regards to feng shui during the Silla period. The Doksan forest was used as a training place for hwarang warriors, and a recreation venue as well as a hunting place for the Silla Kings, especially the 26th ruler, King Jinpyeong's favorite place. Since 1975, Hwangseong Park has been designated as "city neighborhood park" and currently consists of multi-purposed Gyeongju Public Stadium, Football Park with 7 football fields and one futsal field, and one gymnasium, as well as Horimjang field for gukgung or Korean traditional archery and a ssireum wrestling ring. In addition, it contains a gateball field, an inline skating rink, jogging courses, and cycling roads. Among them, the construction of Gyeongju Public Stadium was completed in 1982. and can accommodate 20,000 audience.

== Facilities ==
- Sports
  - Gyeongju Public Stadium
  - Gyeongju Gymnasium
  - Gyeongju Football Park
  - Horimjeong - gukgung (Korean traditional archery) field,
  - Ssrieum wrestling ring- Ssireum
  - Gateball field
  - Inline skating rink
  - Jogging courses
  - Bicycling roads
- Memorials and monuments
  - Statue of General Kim Yusin
  - Park Mok-wol's poem monument
  - Chunghon Tower
- Gyeongju Municipal Library
- Hwangseong-dong resident office

== Gallery ==
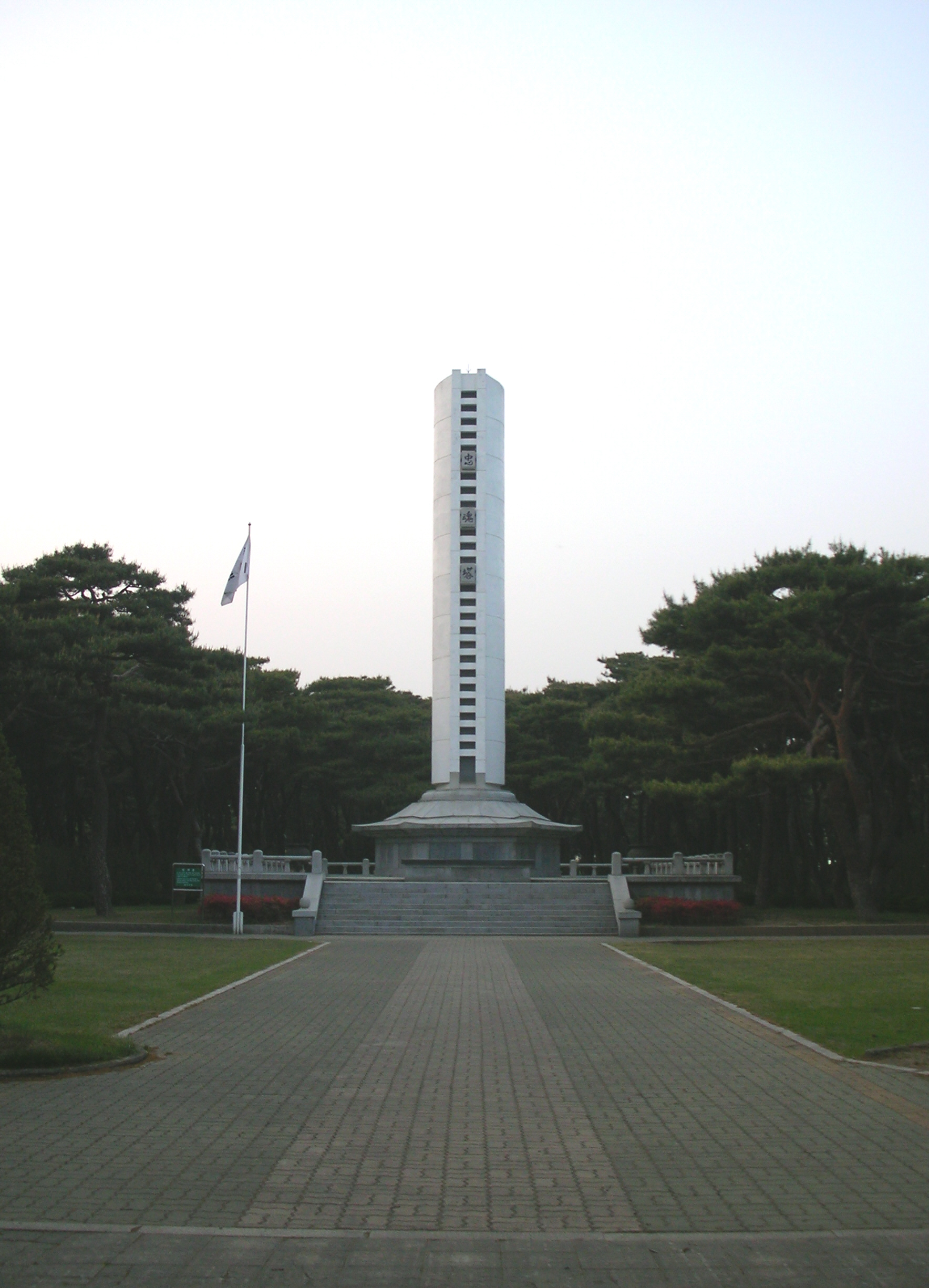
Chunghon Tower

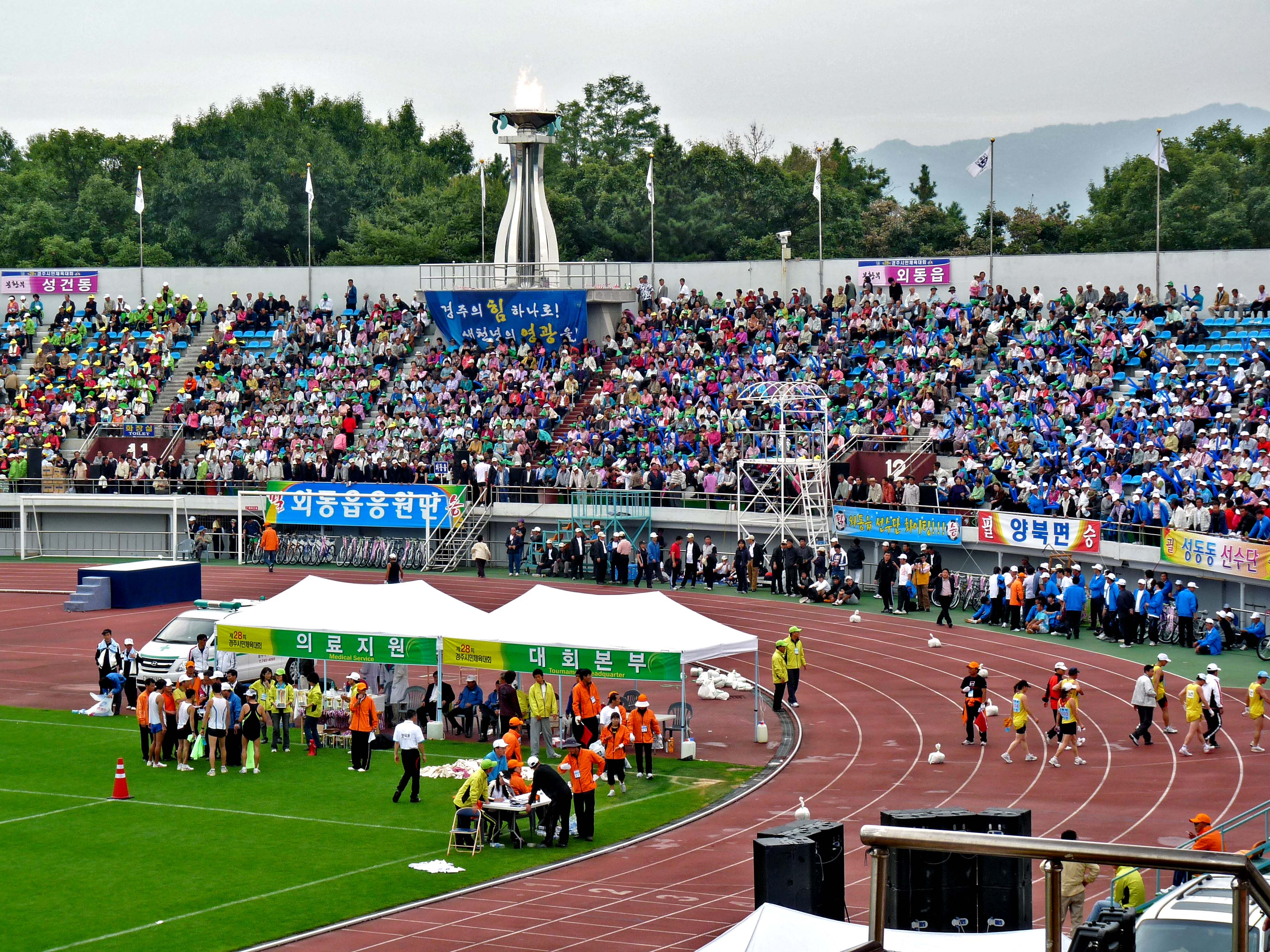
2008 Gyeongju Citizens' Athletics Festival held at Gyeongju Public Stadium

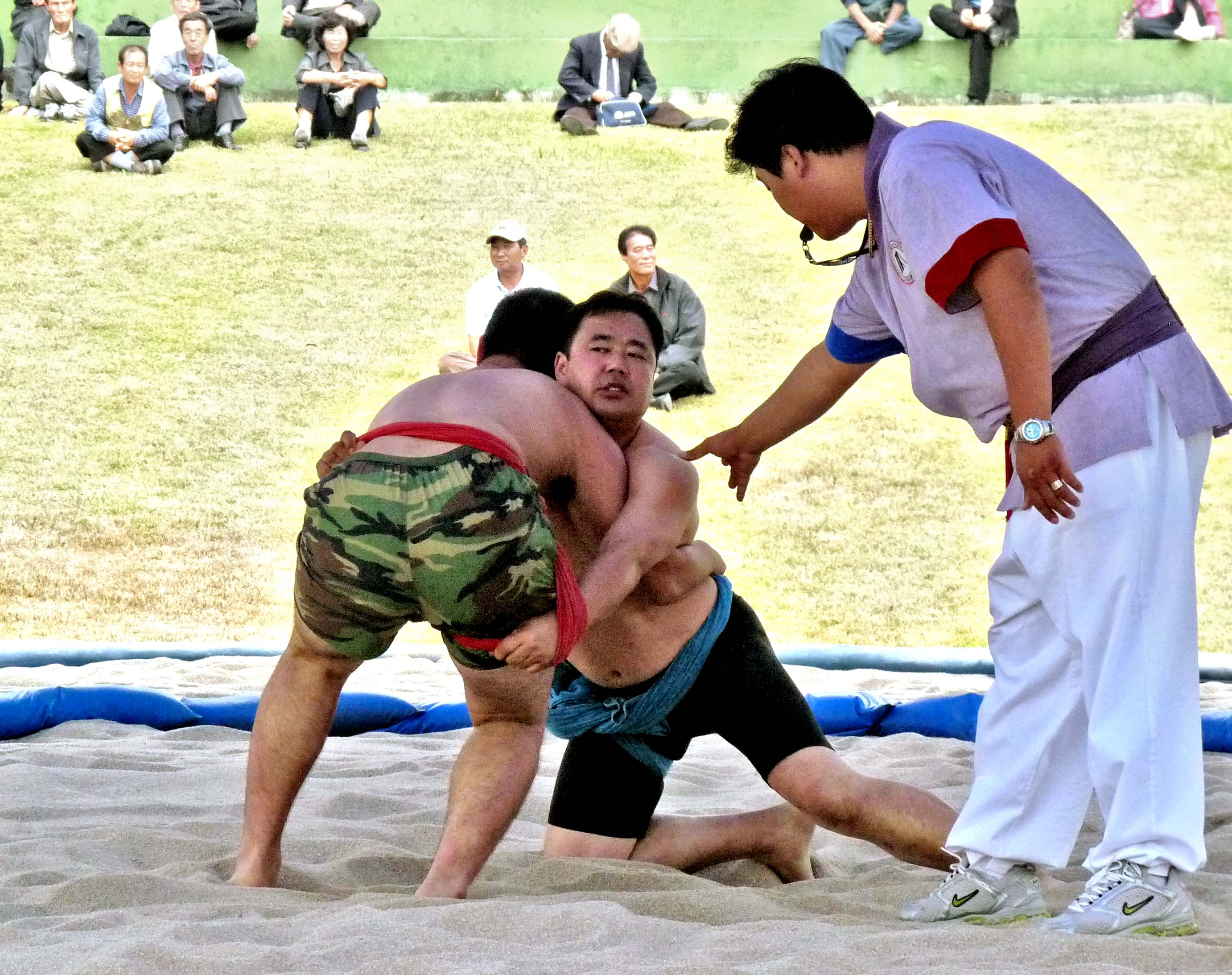
Ssireum wrestling ring
