= Daegu Marathon =

South Korean marathon race

- Date: Early April
- Location: Daegu, South Korea
- Event type: Road
- Distance: Marathon, 10K, 5K
- Established: 2009
- Course records: Men's: 2:05:33 (2019) (Kenya) Filex Kiprotich; Women's: 2:21:08 (2024) (Ethiopia) Ruti Aga
- Website: Daegu Marathon
- Participants: 51 (2019)

The Daegu Marathon is an annual marathon race which takes place in 4th Sunday in February in Daegu, South Korea. The day's events also feature a 5K event and a 10K event, and a half course marathon, as well as the full course marathon (42.195 km).

It was first designated as an International Association of Athletics Federations (IAAF) certified competition in 2009, and was recognized as a Silver Label competition for 7 years from 2013, and was promoted to a Gold Label competition from the 2023 competition, and was designated as a Gold Label competition for 3 consecutive years until the 2025 competition. It is the first domestic and currently the only domestic Gold Label competition recognized by the World Athletics Federation (WA).

The holding date has been adjusted to the 4th Sunday in February from the 2025 competition. The 2025 competition will be held on February 23, 2025.

It is aiming to be promoted to one of the world's top 8 marathons by offering the world's highest prize money. Starting with the 2024 competition (same prize money as the 2025 competition), the Daegu Marathon winners (1st place/male/female each) will receive $160,000 in prize money, which surpasses the Boston Marathon, which previously offered the highest prize money at $150,000, and currently holds the title of the competition with the highest prize money in the world.

The 2025 competition will once again set a new record with 40,130 participants in the Elite category (top-level elite athletes) and Masters category (13,023 full course, 6,924 half course, 14,203 10 km, 5,980 health run).

In particular, the Masters category has the largest number of participants among domestic marathons, surpassing the Seoul Marathon, which was the largest until 2024, and is showing the status of the Daegu Marathon, which aims to surpass the four major marathons in Korea (Dongma, Jema, Chunma, Daema) and become one of the eight major marathons in the world.

== Past winners ==
Key: Course record

Edition	Year	Men's winner	Time (h:m:s)	Women's winner	Time (h:m:s)
1st	2009	Ji Young-jun (KOR)	2:08:30	Yeshi Esayias (ETH)	2:30:44
2nd	2010	Deressa Chimsa (ETH)	2:08:45	Yeshi Esayias (ETH)	2:29:17
3rd	2011	Yusuf Songoka (KEN)	2:08:08	Atsede Habtamu (ETH)	2:25:52
4th	2012	David Kiyeng (KEN)	2:07:57	Alemitu Abera (ETH)	2:24:57
5th	2013	Abraham Kiprotich (KEN)	2:08:33	Margaret Agai (KEN)	2:23:28
6th	2014	Yemane Tsegay (ETH)	2:06:51	Mulu Seboka (ETH)	2:25:23
7th	2015	Girmay Birhanu (ETH)	2:07:26	Meselech Melkamu (ETH)	2:27:24
8th	2016	James Kwambai (KEN)	2:10:46	Caroline Kilel (KEN)	2:27:39
9th	2017	Mathew Kisorio (KEN)	2:07:32	Pamela Rotich (KEN)	2:27:48
10th	2018	Abraham Kiptum (KEN)	2:06:29	Janet Rono (KEN)	2:28:01
11th	2019	Filex Kiprotich (KEN)	2:05:33	Pamela Rotich (KEN)	2:28:10
	2020	cancelled due to coronavirus pandemic			
	2021	A virtual event was held instead of the cancelled race meeting			
12th	2022	Shifera Tamru (ETH)	2:06:31	Nazret Weldu (ERI)	2:21:56
13th	2023	Milkesa Mengesha (ETH)	2:06:49	Ayantu Abera (ETH)	2:25:44
14th	2024	Stephen Kiprop (KEN)	2:07:04	Ruti Aga (ETH)	2:21:08
