= Gyeongju International Marathon =

Road running event in Gyeongju, South Korea

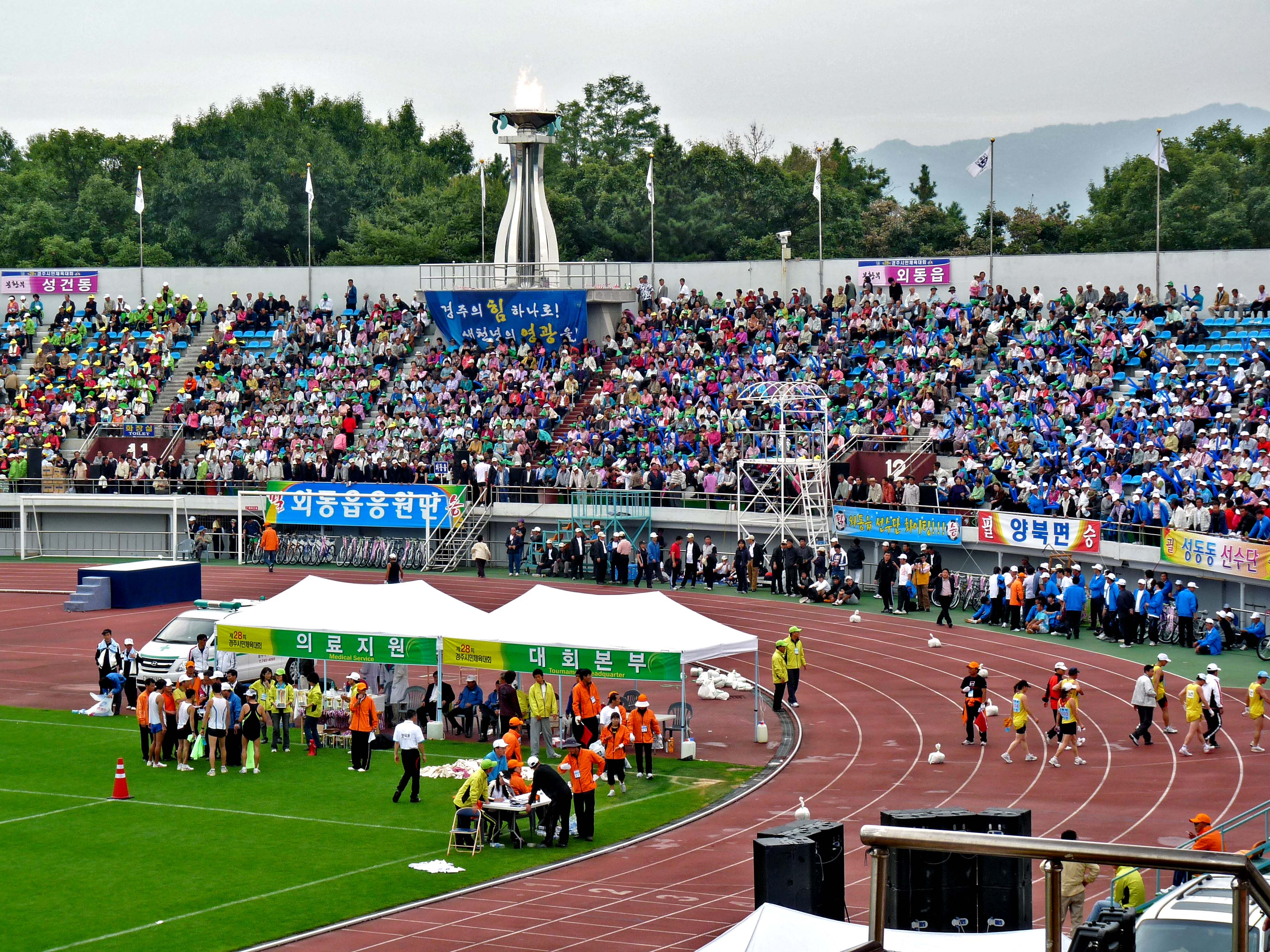
- The Gyeongju Public Stadium in Hwangseong Park is the finishing point of the race
- Date: Mid-October
- Location: Gyeongju, South Korea
- Event type: Road
- Distance: Marathon
- Primary sponsor: The Dong-a Ilbo
- Established: 1993/2006
- Course records: Men's: 2:06:46 (2012) (Kenya) Wilson Loyanae; Women's: 2:31:21 (2008) (South Korea) Yun Sun-suk
- Website: Gyeongju Marathon

The Gyeongju International Marathon is an annual road running event over the marathon distance (42.195 km) which takes place in mid-October in Gyeongju, South Korea. It gained IAAF Silver Label Road Race status in 2010.

First held in 1993, the event began as an amateur competition for the city's residents and club-level runners. By 1999, over 10,000 runners took part in the day's event on an annual basis. After an initial incorporation of an international race in the mid-1990s, the race again reverted to being a national Korean competition due to financial constraints. The race was moved to Seoul in 2000 but the Gyeongju marathon re-emerged in 2006 and elite foreign runners returned to the city the following year.

The competition now features an international elite-level marathon race for both men and women, as well as amateur fun run events over the half marathon, 10K and 5K distances. The event is one of a series of races in the country (alongside the Baekje Marathon and Seoul International Marathon) which are sponsored by The Dong-a Ilbo, a Korean daily broadsheet. The competition is one of two annual road running festivals in the city, the other being the Gyeongjyu Cherry Blossom Marathon which is held in April when the trees come into blossom.

The course of the marathon begins in Hwangseong Park and ends on the running track of the Gyeongju Public Stadium within the park. The men's course record for the marathon is 2:08:52, which was set by Yemane Tsegay in 2008, while the women's record is held by national runner Yun Sun-suk, whose mark of 2:31:21 was set in 2007.

== Past winners ==
Key: Course record

| Edition | Year | Men's winner | Time (h:m:s) | Women's winner | Time (h:m:s) |
|---|---|---|---|---|---|
| 1st | 2007 | Edwin Komen (KEN) | 2:09:44 | Yun Sun-suk (KOR) | 2:35:53 |
| 2nd | 2008 | Sylvester Teimet (KEN) | 2:09:53 | Yun Sun-suk (KOR) | 2:31:21 |
| 3rd | 2009 | Yemane Tsegay (ETH) | 2:08:52 | Kim Young-jin (KOR) | 2:46:42 |
| 4th | 2010 | Dejene Yirdaw (ETH) | 2:09:13 | Chung Yun-hee (KOR) | 2:32:09 |
| 5th | 2011 | Wilson Loyanae (KEN) | 2:09:23 | Lim Kyung-hee (KOR) | 2:38:21 |
| 6th | 2012 | Wilson Loyanae (KEN) | 2:06:46 | Choi Bo-ra (KOR) | 2:42:20 |
| 7th | 2013 | Joel Kemboi (KEN) | 2:07:48 | Choi Bo-ra (KOR) | 2:42:40 |
| 8th | 2014 | Silas Cheboit (KEN) | 2:07:15 | Lim Kyung-hee (KOR) | 2:39:56 |
| 9th | 2015 | Wilson Loyanae (KEN) | 2:07:01 | Lee Sook-jung (KOR) | 2:39:21 |
| 10th | 2016 | Filex Kiprotich (KEN) | 2:06:58 | Kang Su-jung (KOR) | 2:45:57 |
| 11th | 2017 | Filex Kiprotich (KEN) | 2:06:54 | Lee Sook-jung (KOR) | 2:39:59 |
| 12th | 2018 | Kennedy Cheboror (KEN) | 2:08:26 | Lee Sook-jung (KOR) | 2:36:44 |
| 13th | 2019 | Kennedy Cheboror (KEN) | 2:08:23 | Baek Sun-jung (KOR) | 2:42:58 |
| | 2020 | cancelled due to coronavirus outbreak | | cancelled due to coronavirus outbreak | |
