= Lee Myeong-jeong =

South Korean long-distance runner

Personal information
- Nationality: South Korean
- Born: 15 April 1945 (age 81) Incheon, South Korea

Sport
- Sport: Long-distance running
- Event: Marathon

Lee Myeong-jeong (Korean: 이명정, born 15 April 1945) is a South Korean long-distance runner. He competed in the marathon at the 1968 Summer Olympics.
