= JTBC Seoul Marathon =

Annual footrace in South Korea

- Location: Seoul, South Korea
- Event type: Road
- Distance: Marathon
- Primary sponsor: JTBC
- Established: 1999
- Course records: Men's: 2:05:29 (2019) (Ethiopia) Shifera Tamru; Women's: 2:29:12 (2025) (South Korea) Lim Ye-Jin
- Website: JTBC Seoul Marathon

The Jamsil Olympic Stadium is the finishing point for the race

The JoongAng Seoul Marathon is an annual footrace that takes place in Seoul, South Korea, usually in early November. First held in 1999, the race was established as a commemoration of Olympic marathon race which was held as part of the 1988 Seoul Olympics. It features a men's marathon elite race, and also has non-professional races of 10 km as well as the marathon distance. Elite international competitors are usually not invited to the women's race, thus that section tends to be a competition between Korean women only.

Sponsored by JoongAng Ilbo, the JoongAng Seoul Marathon one of two annual international marathons in the city: the Seoul International Marathon is held in March and is sponsored by rival newspaper The Dong-a Ilbo. It has received IAAF Bronze Label Road Race status and hosted the Asian Marathon Championship in 2004.

It began as a half marathon with around 1300 participants in the first run. The course was selected as a national championship race from 2001 onwards and it became a full marathon course the following year. A 5 km short course event was held at the inaugural edition and it featured for three years until its discontinuation in 2002. In 2007 it was awarded Silver Label Race Road status by the IAAF and by 2008 around 25,000 runners were competing at each annual event.

Tracing a loop across Seoul, the course is generally flat, which allows for fast finishing times. It takes place in the south-east part of the city, heading into the suburbs towards Seongnam before looping back to finish in the Jamsil Olympic Stadium. The fast course has resulted in a number of sub-2:09 runs and even one sub-2:06 run in the men's race over the course's history. James Kwambai is the men's course record holder with 2:05:50 hours and is the most successful athlete at the race, having won three times consecutively from 2011 to 2013. The women's course record is 2:29:12 hours, set by national runner Lim Ye-Jin.

== Past winners ==
=== Half marathon ===
Edition	Year	Men's winner	Time (h:m:s)	Women's winner	Time (h:m:s)
1st	1999	Baek Seung-Do (KOR)	1:04:41	Kwon Eun-ju (KOR)	1:13:58
2nd	2000	You Young-Jin (KOR)	1:04:06	Yoon Sun-Sook (KOR)	1:13:31
3rd	2001	John Nada Saya (TAN)	1:01:58	Bae Hae-Jin (KOR)	1:13:06

=== Marathon ===
Key: Course record Asian Marathon Championship race

Edition	Year	Men's winner	Time (h:m:s)	Women's winner	Time (h:m:s)
4th	2002	Mbarak Hussein (KEN)	2:09:46	Oh Jung-hee (KOR)	2:37:58
5th	2003	Pavel Loskutov (EST)	2:09:15	Chung Yun-hee (KOR)	2:30:50
6th	2004	Pavel Loskutov (EST)	2:09:34	Zhang Shujing (CHN)	2:36:22
7th	2005	William Kiplagat (KEN)	2:08:27	Kwon Keun-young (KOR)	2:49:09
8th	2006	Jason Mbote (KEN)	2:08:13	Kim Hye-kyong (KOR)	2:40:36
9th	2007	Joshua Chelanga (KEN)	2:08:14	Lee Eun-jung (KOR)	2:29:32
10th	2008	Solomon Molla (ETH)	2:08:46	Lee Sun-young (KOR)	2:29:58
11th	2009	Francis Kibiwott (KEN)	2:09:00	Lee Sun-young (KOR)	2:34:22
12th	2010	David Kiyeng (KEN)	2:08:15	Kim Eun-jung (KOR)	2:44:25
13th	2011	James Kwambai (KEN)	2:08:50	Choi Gyeong-hui (KOR)	2:40:49
14th	2012	James Kwambai (KEN)	2:05:50	Choi Gyeong-hui (KOR)	2:39:20
15th	2013	James Kwambai (KEN)	2:06:25	Park Ho-sun (KOR)	2:31:32
16th	2014	Feyisa Bekele (ETH)	2:07:43	Ahn Seul-ki (KOR)	2:37:47
17th	2015	Tebalu Zawude (ETH)	2:08:46	Park Ho-sun (KOR)	2:36:30
18th	2016	Joel Kemboi (KEN)	2:08:07	Kim Sun-ae (KOR)	2:44:13
19th	2017	Thomas Rono (KEN)	2:09:13	Kim Do-yeon (KOR)	2:31:24
20th	2018	Asefa Mengstu (ETH)	2:08:11	Kim Seong-eun (KOR)	2:38:47
21st	2019	Shifera Tamru (ETH)	2:05:29	Lee Sook-jung (KOR)	2:48:15
	2020 / 2021	Canceled due to the COVID-19 pandemic			
22nd	2022	Amedework Walelegn (ETH)	2:06:59		
23rd	2023	Balew Yihunle (ETH)	2:07:12	Lim Ye-Jin (KOR)	2:34:46
24th	2024	Balew Yihunle (ETH)	2:07:37	Choi Jung Yoon (KOR)	2:31:55
25th	2025	Nicholas Kitundu (KEN)	2:05:32	Lim Ye-Jin (KOR)	2:29:12
