= Lee Mi-ok =

South Korean long-distance runner

Lee Mi-Ok (born March 10, 1968) is a retired female long-distance runner from South Korea. She set her personal best (2:32:51) in the marathon at the 1988 Summer Olympics.

== Achievements ==
- All results regarding marathon, unless stated otherwise

Year	Competition	Venue	Position	Notes
Representing South Korea
1988	Olympic Games	Seoul, South Korea	15th	2:32:51
1990	Asian Games	Beijing, PR China	3rd	2:36:31
1992	Olympic Games	Barcelona, Spain	25th	2:54:21
