= Yoo Jae-sung =

South Korean long-distance runner

Personal information
- Nationality: South Korean
- Born: 20 February 1960 (age 66)

Sport
- Sport: Long-distance running
- Event: Marathon
Medal record
Representing South Korea
Asian Games
Bronze medal – third place	1986 Seoul	Marathon

Yoo Jae-sung (born 20 February 1960) is a South Korean long-distance runner. He competed in the men's marathon at the 1988 Summer Olympics.
