= Lee Eun-jung =

South Korean long-distance runner (born 1981)

Personal information
- Born: 21 April 1981 (age 45) South Korea
- Occupation: Long-distance runner

Korean name
- Hangul: 이은정
- RR: I Eunjeong
- MR: I Ŭnjŏng
Medal record
Women's athletics
Representing South Korea
Asian Championships
Silver medal – second place	2005 Incheon	5000 m

Lee Eun-jung (born April 21, 1981) is a South Korean female long-distance runner. She is best known for winning the half marathon at the 2005 Summer Universiade.

She won the 2007 edition of the JoongAng Seoul Marathon and has represented her country twice at Olympic level, running at the 2004 Athens Olympics and the 2008 Beijing Games.

== Achievements ==
Year	Competition	Venue	Position	Event	Notes
Representing South Korea
2004	Olympic Games	Athens, Greece	19th	Marathon	2:37:23
2005	Universiade	İzmir, Turkey	1st	Half marathon	1:14:31
2005	Asian Championships	Incheon, South Korea	2nd	5000 m	15:41.67
2008	Olympic Games	Beijing, China	25th	Marathon	2:33:07

== Personal bests ==
- 3000 metres - 9:43.12 min (2007)
- 5000 metres - 15:41.67 min (2005)
- 10,000 metres - 32:43.35 min (2005)
- Half marathon - 1:11:15 hrs (2005)
- Marathon - 2:26:17 hrs (2004)
