= 2017 IAAF Road Race Label Events =

Road running competition series

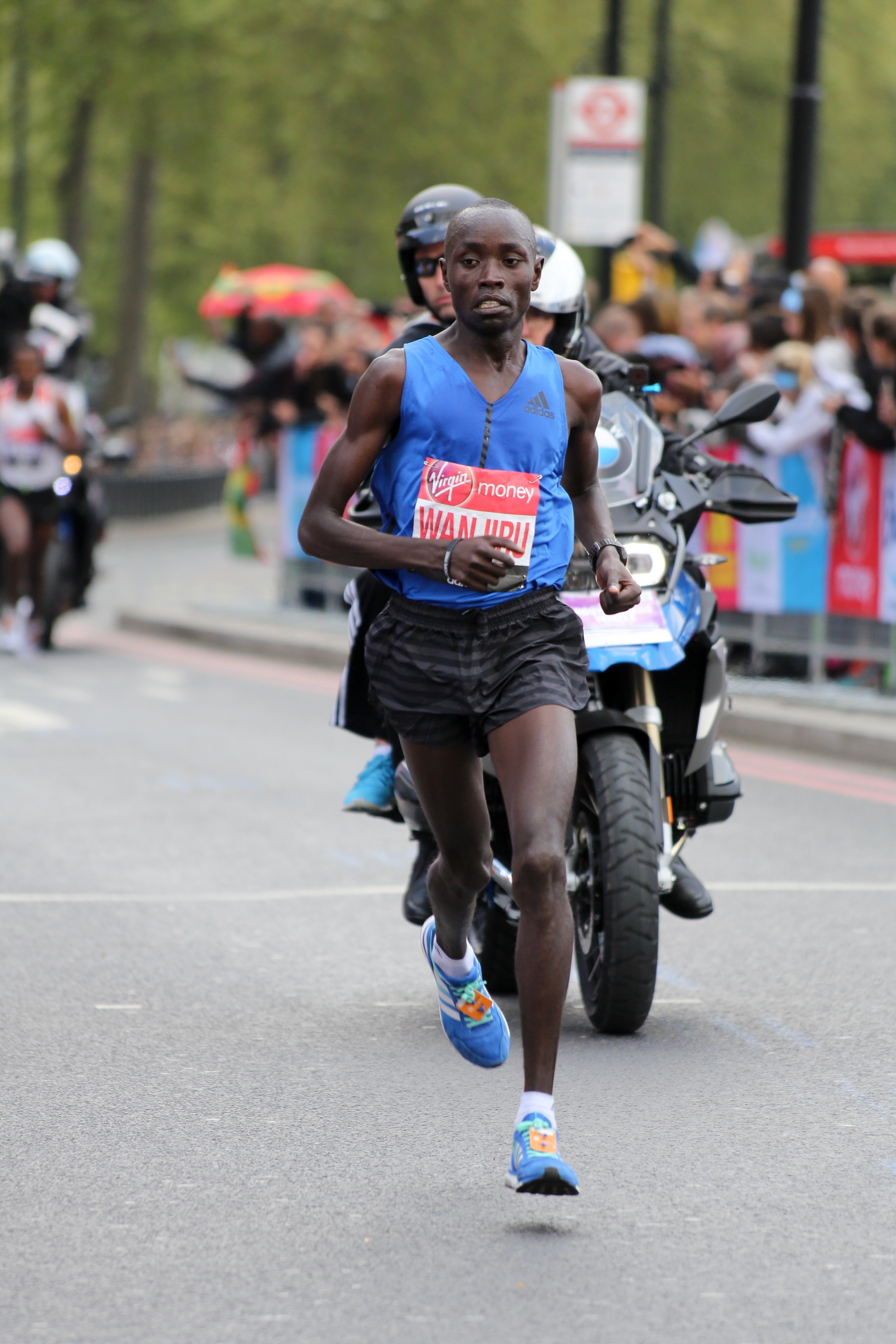
Daniel Wanjiru en route to winning the 2017 London Marathon

The 2017 IAAF Road Race Label Events was the tenth edition of the global series of road running competitions given Label status of Gold, Silver or Bronze by the International Association of Athletics Federations (IAAF). The series included 103 road races in total, 50 Gold, 20 Silver and 33 Bronze. In terms of distance, 68 races were marathons, 23 were half marathons, 9 were 10K runs, and three were held over other distances. The series included all six World Marathon Majors in the Gold category.

Joyciline Jepkosgei was the most successful athlete in the series that year, with four wins. Three-time winners Eunice Chumba and Rahma Tusa were the only others to achieve more than two victories in the series. Kenyan and Ethiopian athletes were dominant on the circuit with a Kenyan topping the podium 92 times and an Ethiopian on 65 occasions. Bahrain (9 winners) was the only nation to produce more than five winners, though all of its winners were also Kenyan- or Ethiopian-born. China hosted the highest number of races, at thirteen.

== Races ==
- World Marathon Majors

Date	Label	Distance	Competition	Venue	Country	Men's winner	Women's winner
2 January	Gold	Marathon	Xiamen International Marathon	Xiamen	China	Lemi Berhanu Hayle (ETH)	Meseret Mengistu (ETH)
20 January	Gold	Marathon	Dubai Marathon	Dubai	United Arab Emirates	Tamirat Tola (ETH)	Worknesh Degefa (ETH)
12 February	Gold	Marathon	Hong Kong Marathon	Hong Kong	China	Melaku Belachew (ETH)	Gulume Tollesa (ETH)
26 February	Gold	Marathon	2017 Tokyo Marathon	Tokyo	Japan	Wilson Kipsang Kiprotich (KEN)	Sarah Chepchirchir (KEN)
26 February	Gold	10K run	World's Best 10K	San Juan	Puerto Rico	Sam Chelanga (USA)	Mary Wacera Ngugi (KEN)
5 March	Gold	Marathon	Lake Biwa Marathon	Ōtsu	Japan	Ezekiel Kiptoo Chebii (KEN)	—
12 March	Gold	Half marathon	Roma-Ostia Half Marathon	Rome	Italy	Guye Adola (ETH)	Gladys Cherono Kiprono (KEN)
12 March	Gold	Marathon	Nagoya Women's Marathon	Nagoya	Japan	—	Eunice Kirwa (ETH)
19 March	Gold	Marathon	Seoul International Marathon	Seoul	South Korea	Amos Kipruto (KEN)	Margaret Agai (KEN)
19 March	Gold	Half marathon	Lisbon Half Marathon	Lisbon	Portugal	Jake Robertson (NZL)	Mare Dibaba (ETH)
1 April	Gold	Half marathon	Prague Half Marathon	Prague	Czech Republic	Tamirat Tola (ETH)	Joyciline Jepkosgei (KEN)
9 April	Gold	Marathon	Rotterdam Marathon	Rotterdam	Netherlands	Marius Kimutai (KEN)	Meskerem Assefa (ETH)
9 April	Gold	Marathon	Paris Marathon	Paris	France	Paul Lonyangata (KEN)	Purity Cherotich Rionoripo (KEN)
17 April	Gold	Marathon	2017 Boston Marathon	Boston	United States	Geoffrey Kirui (KEN)	Edna Kiplagat (KEN)
23 April	Gold	Marathon	Madrid Marathon	Madrid	Spain	Bonsa Dida (ETH)	Elizabeth Rumokol (KEN)
23 April	Gold	Marathon	Vienna City Marathon	Vienna	Austria	Albert Korir (KEN)	Nancy Kiprop (KEN)
23 April	Gold	Half marathon	Gifu Seiryu Half Marathon	Gifu	Japan	Alexander Mutiso (KEN)	Joyciline Jepkosgei (KEN)
23 April	Gold	Half marathon	Yangzhou Jianzhen International Half Marathon	Yangzhou	China	Mosinet Geremew Bayih (ETH)	Sutume Asefa Kebede (ETH)
23 April	Gold	Marathon	2017 London Marathon	London	United Kingdom	Daniel Wanjiru (KEN)	Mary Jepkosgei Keitany (KEN)
30 April	Gold	Half marathon	Istanbul Half Marathon	Istanbul	Turkey	Ismail Juma (TAN)	Ruth Chepngetich (KEN)
7 May	Gold	Marathon	Prague Marathon	Prague	Czech Republic	Gebretsadik Abraha (ETH)	Valary Jemeli Aiyabei (KEN)
7 May	Gold	Marathon	Yellow River Estuary Marathon	Dongying	China	Husen Muhammedahin Esmael (ETH)	Letebrhan Haylay (ETH)
20 May	Gold	Half marathon	Karlovy Vary Half Marathon	Karlovy Vary	Czech Republic	Wilfred Kimitei (KEN)	Yvonne Jelagat (KEN)
27 May	Gold	10K run	Ottawa 10K Road Race	Ottawa	Canada	Leul Gebresilase (ETH)	Netsanet Gudeta (ETH)
28 May	Gold	Marathon	Ottawa Marathon	Ottawa	Canada	Eliud Kiptanui (KEN)	Guteni Imana (ETH)
3 June	Gold	Half marathon	České Budějovice Half Marathon	České Budějovice	Czech Republic	Justus Kangogo (KEN)	Agnes Jeruto Barsosio (KEN)
24 June	Gold	Half marathon	Olomouc Half Marathon	Olomouc	Czech Republic	Josphat Kiptis (KEN)	Worknesh Degefa (ETH)
2 July	Gold	Marathon	Gold Coast Marathon	Gold Coast	Australia	Takuya Noguchi (JPN)	Abebech Afework (ETH)
30 July	Gold	Half marathon	Bogotá Half Marathon	Bogotá	Colombia	Feyisa Lilesa (ETH)	Brigid Chepchirchir Kosgei (KEN)
9 September	Gold	10K run	Prague Grand Prix	Prague	Czech Republic	Benard Kimeli (KEN)	Joyciline Jepkosgei (KEN)
16 September	Gold	Half marathon	Ústí nad Labem Half Marathon	Ústí nad Labem	Czech Republic	Barselius Kipyego (KEN)	Violah Jepchumba (BHR)
17 September	Gold	Marathon	Beijing Marathon	Beijing	China	Salah Eddine Bounasr (MAR)	Melesech Tsegaye Beyene (ETH)
17 September	Gold	Marathon	Cape Town Marathon	Cape Town	South Africa	Asefa Mengstu (ETH)	Betelhem Moges (ETH)
17 September	Gold	Half marathon	Copenhagen Half Marathon	Copenhagen	Denmark	Abraham Cheroben (BHR)	Eunice Chumba (BHR)
17 September	Gold	Marathon	Sydney Marathon	Sydney	Australia	Shota Hattori (JPN)	Makda Harun (AUS)
24 September	Gold	Marathon	2017 Berlin Marathon	Berlin	Germany	Eliud Kipchoge (KEN)	Gladys Cherono Kiprono (KEN)
8 October	Gold	Marathon	2017 Chicago Marathon	Chicago	United States	Galen Rupp (USA)	Tirunesh Dibaba (ETH)
15 October	Gold	Marathon	Lisbon Marathon	Lisbon	Portugal	Birhan Nebebew (ETH)	Eunice Chumba (BHR)
15 October	Gold	Half marathon	Lisbon Half Marathon	Lisbon	Portugal	Ishhimael Bushendich Chemtan (KEN)	Sarah Chepchirchir (KEN)
15 October	Gold	Marathon	Amsterdam Marathon	Amsterdam	Netherlands	Lawrence Cherono (KEN)	Tadelech Bekele (ETH)
22 October	Gold	Half marathon	Valencia Half Marathon	Valencia	Spain	Abraham Cheroben (BHR)	Joyciline Jepkosgei (KEN)
22 October	Gold	Marathon	Toronto Marathon	Toronto	Canada	Philemon Rono (KEN)	Marta Megra (ETH)
29 October	Gold	Marathon	Frankfurt Marathon	Frankfurt	Germany	Shura Kitata Tola (ETH)	Vivian Cheruiyot (KEN)
5 November	Gold	Marathon	2017 New York City Marathon	New York City	United States	Geoffrey Kipsang Kamworor (KEN)	Shalane Flanagan (USA)
12 November	Gold	Marathon	Istanbul Marathon	Istanbul	Turkey	Abraham Kiprotich (FRA)	Ruth Chepngetich (KEN)
12 November	Gold	Marathon	Shanghai Marathon	Shanghai	China	Stephen Mokoka (RSA)	Roza Dereje Bekele (ETH)
19 November	Gold	Marathon	Valencia Marathon	Valencia	Spain	Sammy Kitwara (KEN)	Aberu Mekuria Zennebe (ETH)
19 November	Gold	Half marathon	Delhi Half Marathon	New Delhi	India	Birhanu Legese (ETH)	Almaz Ayana (ETH)
3 December	Gold	Marathon	Fukuoka Marathon	Fukuoka	Japan	Sondre Nordstad Moen (NOR)	—
3 December	Gold	Marathon	Singapore Marathon	Singapore	Singapore	Cosmas Koech Kimutai (KEN)	Pamela Jepkosgei Rotich (KEN)
15 January	Silver	Marathon	Houston Marathon	Houston	United States	Dominic Ondoro (KEN)	Meskerem Assefa (ETH)
29 January	Silver	Marathon	Osaka Marathon	Osaka	Japan	—	Risa Shigetomo (JPN)
5 February	Silver	Half marathon	Kagawa Marugame Half Marathon	Marugame	Japan	Callum Hawkins (GBR)	Eunice Kirwa (BHR)
12 February	Silver	Half marathon	Barcelona Half Marathon	Barcelona	Spain	Leonard Kipkoech Langat (KEN)	Florence Kiplagat (KEN)
19 February	Silver	Marathon	Seville Marathon	Seville	Spain	Erik Titus (KEN)	Paula González Berodia (ESP)
19 March	Silver	Marathon	Chongqing Marathon	Chongqing	China	Afewerk Mesfin Woldetensae (ETH)	Rael Nguriatukei Kinyara (KEN)
2 April	Silver	Marathon	Rome Marathon	Rome	Italy	Shura Kitata Tola (ETH)	Rahma Tusa (ETH)
2 April	Silver	Marathon	Daegu Marathon	Daegu	South Korea	Mathew Kipkoech (KEN)	Pamela Jepkosgei Rotich (KEN)
9 April	Silver	Marathon	Hannover Marathon	Hannover	Germany	Allan Kipkorir Kiprono (KEN)	Fate Tola (GER)
23 April	Silver	Marathon	Łódź Marathon	Łódź	Poland	Samson Kiprono Barmao (KEN)	Kenza Dahmani (ALG)
23 April	Silver	Marathon	Warsaw Marathon	Warsaw	Poland	Felix Kimutai (KEN)	Nastassia Ivanova (BLR)
11 June	Silver	Marathon	Lanzhou Marathon	Lanzhou	China	Kelkile Gezahegn (ETH)	Ashete Bekere (ETH)
17 September	Silver	10 miles	Dam tot Damloop	Amsterdam	Netherlands	Birhanu Legese (ETH)	Mercyline Chelangat (UGA)
1 October	Silver	Half marathon	Cardiff Half Marathon	Cardiff	United Kingdom	John Kipsang Lotiang (KEN)	Edith Chelimo (KEN)
29 October	Silver	20K run	Marseille-Cassis Classique Internationale	Marseille	France	Jemal Mekonnen (ETH)	Edith Chelimo (KEN)
12 November	Silver	Marathon	Saitama Marathon	Saitama	Japan	—	Flomena Cheyech Daniel (KEN)
12 November	Silver	Marathon	Beirut Marathon	Beirut	Lebanon	Dominic Ruto (KEN)	Eunice Chumba (BHR)
10 December	Silver	Marathon	Guangzhou Marathon	Guangzhou	China	Dickson Kipsang (KEN)	Rahma Tusa (ETH)
31 December	Silver	10K run	San Silvestre Vallecana	Madrid	Spain	Eric Kiptanui (KEN)	Gelete Burka (ETH)
31 December	Silver	10K run	Corrida de Houilles	Houilles	France	Julien Wanders (SUI)	Stacey Chepkemboi Ndiwa (KEN)
15 January	Bronze	Half marathon	Houston Half Marathon	Houston	United States	Leonard Korir (USA)	Veronicah Nyaruai (KEN)
22 January	Bronze	Half marathon	Santa Pola Half Marathon	Seville	Spain	Peter Cheruiyot Kirui (KEN)	Antonina Kwambai (KEN)
12 March	Bronze	Marathon	Barcelona Marathon	Barcelona	Spain	Jonah Kipkemoi Chesum (KEN)	Helen Bekele (ETH)
19 March	Bronze	Marathon	New Taipei City Wan Jin Shi Marathon	New Taipei City	Taiwan	Kipkogei Yego (KEN)	Bayartsogtyn Mönkhzayaa (MGL)
19 March	Bronze	Half marathon	Gdynia Half Marathon	Gdynia	Poland	Hillary Kiptum Maiyo Kimaiyo (KEN)	Fatiha Benchatki (MAR)
26 March	Bronze	Half marathon	Warsaw Half Marathon	Warsaw	Poland	John Kipsang Lotiang (KEN)	Ayantu Gemechu Abdi (ETH)
2 April	Bronze	Marathon	Milano City Marathon	Milan	Italy	Edwin Koech Kipngetich (KEN)	Sheila Chepkech (KEN)
2 April	Bronze	Marathon	Santiago Marathon	Santiago	Chile	Luka Lobuwan (KEN)	Inés Melchor (PER)
9 April	Bronze	Marathon	Pyongyang Marathon	Pyongyang	North Korea	Pak Chol (PRK)	Jo Un-ok (PRK)
16 April	Bronze	Marathon	Nagano Olympic Commemorative Marathon	Nagano	Japan	Taiga Ito (JPN)	Racheal Jemutai Mutgaa (KEN)
7 May	Bronze	Marathon	Geneva Marathon	Geneva	Switzerland	William Yegon (KEN)	Megersa Motu (ETH)
13 May	Bronze	10K run	Okpekpe Road Race	Okpekpe	Nigeria	Gabru Azemra (ETH)	Leule Gebrselassie (ETH)
14 May	Bronze	Marathon	Riga Marathon	Riga	Latvia	Joseph Kyengo Munywoki (KEN)	Bekelech Daba (ETH)
21 May	Bronze	10K run	World 10K Bangalore	Bangalore	India	Alex Oloitiptip Korio (KEN)	Irene Chepet Cheptai (KEN)
28 May	Bronze	Marathon	Edinburgh Marathon	Edinburgh	United Kingdom	Julius Korir (KEN)	Eddah Jepkosgei (KEN)
17 June	Bronze	10K run	Corrida de Langueux	Langueux	France	Dawit Fikadu (BHR)	Birham Mihretu (ETH)
24 June	Bronze	10K run	Vidovdan Road Race	Brčko	Bosnia and Herzegovina	Lencho Tesfaye Anbesa (ETH)	Belaynesh Tsegaye Beyene (ETH)
27 August	Bronze	Marathon	Mexico City Marathon	Mexico City	Mexico	Fikadu Kebede Debele (ETH)	Gladys Tejeda (PER)
10 September	Bronze	Marathon	Minsk Marathon	Minsk	Belarus	Hillary Kiptum Maiyo Kimaiyo (KEN)	Lyudmyla Kovalenko (BLR)
10 September	Bronze	Marathon	Taiyuan Marathon	Taiyuan	China	Azmeraw Bekele (ETH)	Chemtai Rionotukei (KEN)
24 September	Bronze	Marathon	Warsaw Marathon	Warsaw	Poland	Błażej Brzeziński (POL)	Bekelu Beji (ETH)
30 September	Bronze	Marathon	Hengshui Lake International Marathon	Hengshui	China	Michael Njenga Kunyuga (KEN)	Betty Wilson Lempus (KEN)
1 October	Bronze	Marathon	Košice Peace Marathon	Košice	Slovakia	Reuben Kiprop Kerio (KEN)	Sheila Jerotich (KEN)
8 October	Bronze	20K run	20 Kilomètres de Paris	Paris	France	Collins Chebii (KEN)	Gebayanesh Ayele (ETH)
8 October	Bronze	Marathon	Bournemouth Marathon	Bournemouth	United Kingdom	Jacek Cieluszecki (GBR)	Laura Trimble (GBR)
22 October	Bronze	Marathon	Venice Marathon	Venice	Italy	Eyob Ghebrehiwet Faniel (ITA)	Sule Utura (ETH)
29 October	Bronze	Marathon	Ljubljana Marathon	Ljubljana	Slovenia	Marius Kimutai (KEN)	Shuko Genemo Rote (ETH)
5 November	Bronze	Marathon	French Riviera Marathon	Nice	France	Dejene Kelkilew (ETH)	Tejitu Siyum (ETH)
5 November	Bronze	Marathon	Hangzhou International Marathon	Hangzhou	China	Azmeraw Bekele (ETH)	Muluhabt Tsega Chekol (ETH)
19 November	Bronze	Half marathon	Boulogne-Billancourt Half Marathon	Boulogne-Billancourt	France	Hiskel Tewelde (ERI)	Rehima Tusa (ETH)
26 November	Bronze	Marathon	Florence Marathon	Florence	Italy	Zelalem Bacha (BHR)	Dire Tune (ETH)
3 December	Bronze	Marathon	Marathon du Gabon	Libreville	Gabon	Peter Kurui (KEN)	Joan Kigen (KEN)
17 December	Bronze	Marathon	Shenzhen Marathon	Shenzhen	China	Peter Kimeli Some (KEN)	Viktoriia Poliudina (KGZ)

== Series summary ==
=== By label ===
Label	Races	Marathon	Half marathon	10K	Other
Gold	50	32	15	3	0
Silver	20	13	3	2	2
Bronze	33	23	5	4	1
Totals	103	68	23	9	3

=== By country ===
Country	Races	Winners
Algeria	0	1
Australia	2	1
Austria	1	0
Bahrain	0	9
Belarus	1	2
Bosnia and Herzegovina	1	0
Canada	3	0
Chile	1	0
China	13	0
Colombia	1	0
Czech Republic	7	0
Denmark	1	0
Eritrea	0	1
Ethiopia	0	65
France	7	1
Gabon	1	0
Germany	3	1
India	2	0
Italy	5	1
Kenya	0	92
Kyrgyzstan	0	1
Japan	9	4
Latvia	1	0
Lebanon	1	0
Mexico	1	0
Mongolia	0	1
Morocco	0	2
Netherlands	3	0
New Zealand	0	1
Nigeria	1	0
North Korea	1	2
Norway	0	1
Peru	0	2
Poland	5	1
Portugal	3	0
Puerto Rico	1	0
Singapore	1	0
Slovakia	1	0
Slovenia	1	0
South Africa	1	1
South Korea	2	0
Spain	8	1
Switzerland	1	1
Taiwan	1	0
Tanzania	0	1
Turkey	2	0
Uganda	0	1
United Arab Emirates	1	0
United Kingdom	4	3
United States	5	4

== Multiple winners ==
Athlete	Country	Sex	Wins
Joyciline Jepkosgei	Kenya	Female	4
Eunice Chumba	Bahrain	Female	3
Rahma Tusa	Ethiopia	Female	3
Abraham Cheroben	Bahrain	Male	2
Azmeraw Bekele	Ethiopia	Male	2
Birhanu Legese	Ethiopia	Male	2
Hillary Kiptum Maiyo Kimaiyo	Kenya	Male	2
John Kipsang Lotiang	Kenya	Male	2
Marius Kimutai	Kenya	Male	2
Shura Kitata Tola	Ethiopia	Male	2
Tamirat Tola	Ethiopia	Male	2
Edith Chelimo	Kenya	Female	2
Eunice Kirwa	Bahrain	Female	2
Gladys Cherono Kiprono	Kenya	Female	2
Meskerem Assefa	Ethiopia	Female	2
Pamela Jepkosgei Rotich	Kenya	Female	2
Ruth Chepngetich	Kenya	Female	2
Sarah Chepchirchir	Kenya	Female	2
Worknesh Degefa	Ethiopia	Female	2
