= 2015 in the sport of athletics =

2015 in athletics
- Major world events: 2015 World Championships
- New competitions: European Games

In 2015, the foremost athletics event was the 2015 World Championships in Athletics in Beijing. The two other major global level competitions in 2015 are the World Cross Country Championships and the IAAF World Relays.

The 2015 season marked the introduction of athletics at the European Games. However, this will not be a major continental event for athletics in the style of the Asian Games, as only the lower tier of the European Team Championships will be contested at the games. Major outdoor continental events will be held for the Americas (Pan American Games), Africa (All-Africa Games), Asia (2015 Asian Athletics Championships) and Oceania (Oceania Athletics Championships).

The Asian Youth Athletics Championships will be inaugurated this year.

== World records ==
=== Indoor ===
| Event | Athlete | Nation | Result | Location | Date |
|---|---|---|---|---|---|
| Men's Two mile run | Mohamed Farah | Great Britain | 8:03.40 (Note: The 2 mile run is not a recognised event for record purposes, however, this represents the world's best performance) | Birmingham, United Kingdom | 21 February |
| Women's 5000 metres | Genzebe Dibaba | Ethiopia | 14:18.86 | Stockholm, Sweden | 19 February |
| Women's discus throw | Shanice Craft | Germany | 62.07 m (Note: The indoor discus throw is not a recognised event for record purposes, however, this represents the world's best performance) | Berlin, Germany | 14 February |

=== Outdoor ===
| Event | Athlete | Nation | Result | Location | Date |
|---|---|---|---|---|---|
| Men's decathlon | Ashton Eaton | United States | 9045 pts | Beijing, China | 29 August |
| Men's 20 km walk | Yusuke Suzuki | Japan | 1:16:36 | Nomi, Japan | 15 March |
| Men's 4 × 110 m hurdles relay | Jason Richardson; Aleec Harris; Aries Merritt; David Oliver | United States | 52.94 (Note: The shuttle hurdle relay is not a recognised event for record purposes, however, this represents the world's best performance) | Des Moines, United States | 25 April |
| Men's Distance medley relay | Kyle Merber; Brycen Spratling; Brandon Johnson; Ben Blankenship | United States | 9:15.50 | Nassau, Bahamas | 3 May |
| Women's 1500 metres | Genzebe Dibaba | Ethiopia | 3:50.07 | Fontvieille, Monaco | 17 July |
| Women's 15K run | Florence Jebet Kiplagat | Kenya | 46:14+ | Barcelona, Spain | 15 February |
| Women's 20K run | Florence Jebet Kiplagat | Kenya | 1:01:54+ | Barcelona, Spain | 15 February |
| Women's half marathon | Florence Jebet Kiplagat | Kenya | 1:05:09 | Barcelona, Spain | 15 February |
| Women's 2000 m steeplechase | Virginia Nyambura | Kenya | 6:02.16 (Note: The 2000 m steeplechase is not a recognised event for record purposes, however, this represents the world's best performance) | Berlin, Germany | 6 September |
| Women's Distance medley relay | Treniere Moser; Sanya Richards-Ross; Ajeé Wilson; Shannon Rowbury | United States | 10:36.50 | Nassau, Bahamas | 2 May |
| Women's hammer throw | Anita Włodarczyk | Poland | 81.08 m | Władysławowo, Poland | 1 August |
| Women's 20 km walk | Liu Hong | China | 1:24:38 | A Coruña, Spain | 6 June |

== Season's bests ==
Best marks of the year
| Event | Men | | | Women | | |
| Event | Athlete | Mark | Notes | Athlete | Mark | Notes |
|---|---|---|---|---|---|---|
| 60 metres | Kim Collins (SKN) | 6.47 | | Murielle Ahouré (CIV) Dafne Schippers (NED) | 7.05 | |
| 100 metres | Justin Gatlin (USA) | 9.74 | | Shelly-Ann Fraser-Pryce (JAM) | 10.74 | |
| 200 metres | Usain Bolt (JAM) | 19.55 | | Dafne Schippers (NED) | 21.63 | |
| 400 metres | Wayde van Niekerk (RSA) | 43.48 | | Allyson Felix (USA) | 49.26 | |
| 800 metres | Amel Tuka (BIH) | 1:42.51 | | Eunice Sum (KEN) | 1:56.99 | |
| 1500 metres | Asbel Kiprop (KEN) | 3:26.69 | | Genzebe Dibaba (ETH) | 3:50.07 | WR |
| 3000 metres | Mohamed Farah (GBR) | 7:34.66 | | Almaz Ayana (ETH) | 8:22.22 | |
| 5000 metres | Yomif Kejelcha (ETH) | 12:53.98 | | Almaz Ayana (ETH) | 14:14.32 | |
| 10,000 metres | Mohamed Farah (GBR) | 26:50.97 | | Gelete Burka (ETH) | 30:49.68 | |
| 60 metres hurdles | Orlando Ortega (CUB) Omar McLeod (JAM) | 7.45 | | Sharika Nelvis (USA) | 7.78 | |
| 100/110 metres hurdles | Orlando Ortega (CUB) | 12.94 | | Sharika Nelvis (USA) | 12.34 | |
| 400 metres hurdles | Nicholas Bett (KEN) | 47.79 | | Zuzana Hejnová (CZE) | 53.50 | |
| 3000 metres steeplechase | Jairus Kipchoge (KEN) | 7:58.83 | | Habiba Ghribi (TUN) | 9:05.36 | |
| 10K run | Stephen Sambu (KEN) | 27:30 | | Gladys Chesire (KEN) | 30:41 | |
| Half marathon | Abraham Cheroben (KEN) | 59:10 | | Florence Jebet Kiplagat (KEN) | 65:09 | WR |
| Marathon | Eliud Kipchoge (KEN) | 2:04:00 | | Gladys Cherono (KEN) | 2:19:25 | |
| 20 kilometres race walk | Yusuke Suzuki (JPN) | 1:16:36 | WR | Liu Hong (CHN) | 1:24:38 | WR |
| 50 kilometres race walk | Matej Tóth (SVK) | 3:34:38 | | — | | |
| Pole vault | Renaud LavillenieFRA (25x17px) | 6.05 m | | Yarisley Silva (CUB) | 4.91 m | |
| High jump | Mutaz Essa Barshim (QAT) | 2.41 m | | Anna Chicherova (RUS) | 2.03 m | |
| Long jump | Jeff Henderson (USA) | 852 m | | Tianna Bartoletta (USA) | 7.14 m | |
| Triple jump | Christian Taylor (USA) | 18.21 m | | Ekaterina Koneva (RUS) | 15.04 m | |
| Shot put | Joe Kovacs (USA) | 22.56 m | | Christina Schwanitz (GER) | 20.77 m | |
| Discus throw | Piotr Małachowski (POL) | 68.29 m | | Denia Caballero (CUB) | 70.65 m | |
| Javelin throw | Julius Yego (KEN) | 92.72 m | | Katharina Molitor (GER) | 67.69 m | |
| Hammer throw | Paweł Fajdek (POL) | 83.93 m | | Anita Włodarczyk (POL) | 81.08 m | WR |
| Pentathlon | — | | | Katarina Johnson-Thompson (GBR) | 5000 pts | |
| Heptathlon | Ilya Shkurenyov (RUS) | 6353 pts | | Brianne Theisen-Eaton (CAN) | 6808 pts | |
| Decathlon | Ashton Eaton (USA) | 9045 pts | WR | — | | |
| 4 × 100 metres relay | Jamaica (JAM); Nesta Carter; Asafa Powell; Nickel Ashmeade; Usain Bolt | 37.36 | | Jamaica (JAM); Veronica Campbell-Brown; Natasha Morrison; Elaine Thompson; Shelly-Ann Fraser-Pryce | 3:19.13 | |
| 4 × 400 metres relay | United States (USA); David Verburg; Tony McQuay; Bryshon Nellum; LaShawn Merritt | 2:57.82 | | Jamaica (JAM); Christine Day; Shericka Jackson; Stephenie Ann McPherson; Novlene Williams-Mills | 3:19.13 | 41.07 |

== Awards ==
=== Men ===
| Award | Winner |
|---|---|
| IAAF World Athlete of the Year | Ashton Eaton (USA) |
| Track & Field News Athlete of the Year | Ashton Eaton (USA) |
| European Athlete of the Year | Greg Rutherford (GBR) |
| European Athletics Rising Star | Konrad Bukowiecki (POL) |

=== Women ===
| Award | Winner |
|---|---|
| IAAF World Athlete of the Year | Genzebe Dibaba (ETH) |
| Track & Field Athlete of the Year | Genzebe Dibaba (ETH) |
| European Athlete of the Year | Dafne Schippers (NED) |
| European Athletics Rising Star | Noemi Zbären (SUI) |

== Major events ==
=== World athletics championships ===
- March 28: 2015 IAAF World Cross Country Championships in (China) Guiyang
  - Ethiopia won both the gold and overall medal tallies.
- May 2 & 3: 2015 IAAF World Relays in (The Bahamas) Nassau
  - Men's 4 × 100 m Relay winners: United States (Mike Rodgers, Justin Gatlin, Tyson Gay, Ryan Bailey)
  - Men's 4 × 200 m Relay winners: Jamaica (Nickel Ashmeade, Rasheed Dwyer, Jason Livermore, Warren Weir)
  - Men's 4 × 400 m Relay winners: United States (David Verburg, Tony McQuay, Jeremy Wariner, LaShawn Merritt)
  - Men's 4 × 800 m Relay winners: United States (Duane Solomon, Erik Sowinski, Casimir Loxsom, Robby Andrews)
  - Men's Distance Medley Relay winners: United States (Kyle Merber, Brycen Spratling, Brandon Johnson, Ben Blankenship) (World Record)
  - Women's 4 × 100 m Relay winners: Jamaica (Simone Facey, Kerron Stewart, Schillonie Calvert, Veronica Campbell-Brown)
  - Women's 4 × 200 m Relay winners: Nigeria (Blessing Okagbare, Regina George, Dominique Duncan, Christy Udoh)
  - Women's 4 × 400 m Relay winners: United States (Phyllis Francis, Natasha Hastings, Sanya Richards-Ross, Francena McCorory)
  - Women's 4 × 800 m Relay winners: United States (Chanelle Price, Maggie Vessey, Molly Beckwith-Ludlow, Alysia Montaño)
  - Women's Distance Medley Relay winners: United States (Treniere Moser, Sanya Richards-Ross, Ajee' Wilson, Shannon Rowbury) (World Record)
- July 15–19: 2015 World Youth Championships in Athletics in (Colombia) Cali
  - The United States won both the gold and overall medal tallies.
- August 6–18: 2015 World Masters Athletics Championships in (France) Lyon
- August 22–30: 2015 World Championships in Athletics in (China) Beijing
  - Kenya and Jamaica won 7 gold medals each. The United States won the overall medal tally.
- October 22–31: 2015 IPC Athletics World Championships in (Qatar) Doha
  - Note: The 2015 IPC marathon events was hosted in London, in conjunction with the 2015 London Marathon, on April 26.
  - China won both the gold and overall medal tallies.

=== Regional athletics championships ===
- February 21 & 22: 2015 NACAC Cross Country Championships in (Colombia) Barranquilla
  - Senior Men's winner: (United States) Maksim Korolev
  - Senior Women's winner: (Peru) Gladys Tejeda
  - Senior Men's Team winners: United States
  - Senior Women's Team winners: United States
- March 5–8: Athletics CAA Junior African Championships 2015 in (Ethiopia) Addis Ababa
  - Nigeria won both the gold and overall medal tallies.
- March 6–8: 2015 European Athletics Indoor Championships in (Czech Republic) Prague
  - Russia won the gold medal tally. Great Britain won the overall medal tally.
- April 23 – 26: Athletics CAA Youth African Championships 2015 in (Mauritius) Port Louis
  - South Africa won both the gold and overall medal tallies.
- May 8 – 10: 2015 Oceania Athletics Championships and 2015 Oceania Youth Athletics Championships in Cairns
  - Host nation, Australia, won both the gold and overall medal tallies in both competitions.
- May 8 – 11: Athletics AAA Youth Asian Championships 2015 in (Qatar) Doha
  - China won both the gold and overall medal tallies.
- June 3–7: 2015 Asian Athletics Championships in Wuhan
  - Host nation, China, won both the gold and overall medal tallies.
- June 12–14: 2015 South American Championships in Athletics in (Peru) Lima
  - Brazil won both the gold and overall medal tallies.
- June 20 & 21: 2015 European Team Championships
  - Super League in Cheboksary winner: Russia
  - First League in (Greece) Heraklion winner: Czech Republic
  - Second League in (Bulgaria) Stara Zagora winner: Denmark
  - Third League in (Azerbaijan) Baku winner: Austria
- July 4 & 5: 2015 Oceania Half Marathon Championships in (Australia) Gold Coast
  - Men: (Japan) Takehiro Deki
  - Women: (Australia) Eloise Wellings
- July 16–19: 2015 European Athletics Junior Championships in (Sweden) Eskilstuna
  - Great Britain won the gold medal tally. Great Britain and Germany won 17 overall medals each.
- July 31 – August 2: 2015 Pan American Junior Athletics Championships in (Canada) Edmonton
  - The United States won both the gold and overall medal tallies.
- August 7–9: 2015 NACAC Championships in San José, Costa Rica
  - The United States won both the gold and overall medal tallies.
- August 9: 2015 South American Marathon Championships in (Paraguay) Asunción
  - Men's winner: (Peru) Juan Huaman
  - Women's winner: (Peru) Wilma Arizapana
- December 13: 2015 European Cross Country Championships in (France) Toulon–Hyères
  - Great Britain won both the gold and overall medal tallies.

== Seasonal results ==
=== World Marathon Majors ===
- February 22: 2015 Tokyo Marathon
  - Winners: (Ethiopia) Endeshaw Negesse (m) / (Ethiopia) Berhane Dibaba (f)
- April 20: 2015 Boston Marathon
  - Winners: (Ethiopia) Lelisa Desisa (m) / (Kenya) Caroline Rotich (f)
- April 26: 2015 London Marathon
  - Winners: (Kenya) Eliud Kipchoge (m) / (Ethiopia) Tigist Tufa (f)
- September 27: 2015 Berlin Marathon
  - Winners: (Kenya) Eliud Kipchoge (m) / (Kenya) Gladys Cherono (f)
- October 11: 2015 Chicago Marathon
  - Winners: (Kenya) Dickson Chumba (m) / (Kenya) Florence Kiplagat (f)
- November 1: 2015 New York City Marathon
  - Winners: (Kenya) Stanley Biwott (m) / (Kenya) Mary Jepkosgei Keitany (f)

=== IAAF Road Race Label Events ===
- January 3 – December 31: 2015 IAAF Label Road Races Calendar

==== Gold Label ====
- January 3: (China) Xiamen International Marathon
  - Winners: (Kenya) Moses Mosop (m) / (Ethiopia) Mare Dibaba (f)
- January 23: (United Arab Emirates) Dubai Marathon
  - Winners: (Ethiopia) Lemi Berhanu (m) / (Ethiopia) Aselefech Mergia (f)
- March 1: (Japan) Lake Biwa Marathon (men only)
  - Winner: (Kenya) Samuel Ndungu
- March 1: (Italy) Roma-Ostia Half Marathon
  - Winners: (Kenya) Robert Chemosin (m) / (Ethiopia) Amane Beriso (f)
- March 1: (Puerto Rico) World's Best 10K
  - Winners: (Kenya) Sammy Kitwara (m) / (Ethiopia) Belaynesh Oljira (f)
- March 8: (Japan) Nagoya Marathon (women only)
  - Winner: (Bahrain) Eunice Kirwa
- March 15: (South Korea) Seoul International Marathon
  - Winners: (Kenya) Wilson Loyanae (m) / (Ethiopia) Guteni Shone (f)
- March 22: (Italy) Rome Marathon
  - Winners: (Ethiopia) Abebe Negewo Degefa (m) / (Ethiopia) Meseret Kitat Tolwalk (f)
- March 22: (Portugal) Lisbon Half Marathon
  - Winners: (United Kingdom) Mo Farah (m) / (Kenya) Rose Chelimo (f)
- March 28: (Czech Republic) Prague Half Marathon
  - Winners: (Kenya) Daniel Wanjiru (m) / (Ethiopia) Worknesh Degefa (f)
- April 12: (Netherlands) Rotterdam Marathon
  - Winners: (Ethiopia) Abera Kuma (m) / (Japan) Asami Kato (f)
- April 12: (France) Paris Marathon
  - Winners: (Kenya) Mark Korir (m) / (Ethiopia) Meseret Mengistu (f)
- April 12: (Austria) Vienna City Marathon
  - Winners: (Ethiopia) Sisay Lemma (m) / (Switzerland) Maja Neuenschwander (f)
- April 19: (China) Yangzhou Jianzhen International Half Marathon
  - Winners: (Ethiopia) Mosinet Geremew (m) / (Kenya) Flomena Cheyech Daniel (f)
- May 3: (Czech Republic) Prague Marathon
  - Winners: (Kenya) Felix Kandie (m) / (Ethiopia) Yebrqual Melese (f)
- May 10: (United Kingdom) Great Manchester Run
  - Winners: (Kenya) Stephen Sambu (m) / (Kenya) Betsy Saina (f)
- May 23: (Canada) Ottawa Race Weekend (10 km event)
  - Winners: (Kenya) Nicholas Bor (m) / (Kenya) Gladys Cherono (f)
- June 20: (Czech Republic) Olomouc Half Marathon
  - Winners: (Kenya) Josphat Kiptis (m) / (Kenya) Mary Jepkosgei Keitany (f)
- July 5: (Australia) Gold Coast Marathon
  - Winners: (Kenya) Kenneth Mburu Mungara (m) / (Japan) Risa Takenaka (f)
- July 26: (Colombia) Bogotá Half Marathon
  - Winners: (Kenya) Stanley Biwott (m) / (Ethiopia) Amane Gobena (f)
- September 5: (Czech Republic) Prague Grand Prix (10 km event)
  - Winners: (Kenya) Daniel Chebii (m) / (Kenya) Peres Jepchirchir (f)
- September 12: (Czech Republic) Ústí nad Labem Half Marathon
  - Winners: (Eritrea) Merhawi Kesete (m) / (Kenya) Peres Jepchirchir (f)
- September 13: (United Kingdom) Great North Run
  - Winners: (United Kingdom) Mo Farah (m) / (Kenya) Mary Jepkosgei Keitany (f)
- September 20: (Colombia) Carrera de la Mujer (women only)
  - Winner: (Ethiopia) Belaynesh Oljira
- September 20: (Australia) Sydney Marathon
  - Winners: (Japan) Hisanori Kitajima (m) / (Kenya) Meriem Wangari (f)
- September 20: (China) Beijing Marathon
  - Winners: (Kenya) Mariko Kiplagat Kipchumba (m) / (Ethiopia) Betelhem Moges (f)
- October 4: (United Kingdom) Great Scottish Run
  - Winners: (Uganda) Moses Ndiema Kipsiro (m) / (Kenya) Edna Kiplagat (f)
- October 18: (Portugal) Lisbon Marathon
  - Winners: (Kenya) Asbel Kipsang (m) / (Kenya) Purity Rionoripo (f)
- October 18: (Portugal) Lisbon Half Marathon
  - Winners: (Eritrea) Nguse Tesfaldet (m) / (Kenya) Beatrice Mutai (f)
- October 18: (Netherlands) Amsterdam Marathon
  - Winners: (Kenya) Bernard Kipyego (m) / (Kenya) Joyce Chepkirui (f)
- October 18: (Canada) Toronto Waterfront Marathon
  - Winners: (Kenya) Ishimael Chemtan (m) / (Ethiopia) Shure Demise (f)
- October 25: (Germany) Frankfurt Marathon
  - Winners: (Ethiopia) Sisay Lemma (m) / (Ethiopia) Gulume Tollesa (f)
- October 25: (United Kingdom) Great South Run
  - Winners: (Uganda) Moses Ndiema Kipsiro (m) / (Kenya) Vivian Cheruiyot (f)
- November 8: (China) Shanghai Marathon
  - Winners: (Kenya) Paul Lonyangata (m) / (Kenya) Rael Nguriatukei Kiyara (f)
- November 15: (Turkey) Istanbul Marathon
  - Winners: (Kenya) Elias Chelimo (m) / (Ethiopia) Amane Gobena (f)
- December 6: (Japan) Fukuoka Marathon (men only)
  - Winner: (Kenya) Patrick Makau Musyoki
- December 6: Singapore Marathon (final)
  - Winners: (Kenya) Julius Maisei (m) / (Kenya) Doris Changeywo (f)

==== Silver Label ====
- January 25: (Japan) Osaka International Ladies Marathon (women only)
  - Winner: (Ukraine) Tetyana Hamera-Shmyrko
- January 25: Hong Kong Marathon
  - Winners: (Ethiopia) Sentayehu Merga (m) / (North Korea) Kim Hye-Gyong (f)
- February 1: (Japan) Kagawa Marugame Half Marathon
  - Winners: (Kenya) Paul Kuira (m) / (Australia) Eloise Wellings (f)
- February 1: (Japan) Beppu-Ōita Marathon (men only)
  - Winner: (Eritrea) Tewelde Estifanos
- April 5: (South Korea) Daegu Marathon
  - Winners: (Ethiopia) Girmay Birhanu (m) / (Ethiopia) Meselech Melkamu (f)
- April 11: (Republic of Ireland) Great Ireland Run
  - Winners: (Kenya) Japhet Korir (m) / (United Kingdom) Gemma Steel (f)
- April 19: (Germany) Hannover Marathon
  - Winners: (Kenya) Jacob Cheshari (m) / (Algeria) Souad Ait Salem (f)
- April 19: (Poland) Łódź Maraton Dbam o Zdrowie
  - Winners: (Kenya) Albert Kiplagat Matebor (m) / (Poland) Monika Stefanowicz (f)
- April 26: (China) Yellow River Estuary International Marathon
  - Winners: (Kenya) Ernest Ngeno (m) / (Kenya) Helena Kirop (f)
- April 26: (Poland) Warsaw Marathon
  - Winners: (Ethiopia) Hayle Lemi Berhanu (m) / (Ethiopia) Fatuma Sado (f)
- April 26: (Spain) Madrid Marathon
  - Winners: (Kenya) Ezekiel Kiptoo Chebii (m) / (Kenya) Monica Jepkoech (f)
- May 17: (Japan) Gifu Seiryu Half Marathon
  - Winners: (Kenya) James Gitahi Rungaru (m) / (Bahrain) Eunice Kirwa
- May 23: (Czech Republic) Mattoni Karlovy Vary Half Marathon
  - Winners: (Kenya) Elijah Tirop (m) / (Ethiopia) Mulu Seboka (f)
- May 24: (Canada) Ottawa Race Weekend (Ottawa Marathon)
  - Winners: (Ethiopia) Girmay Birhanu (m) / (Ethiopia) Aberu Mekuria (f)
- May 30: (United States) Freihofer's Run for Women (women only)
  - Winner: (Kenya) Emily Chebet
- June 6: (Czech Republic) České Budějovice Half Marathon
  - Winners: (Kenya) Abraham Cheroben (m) / (Kenya) Rose Chelimo (f)
- September 20: (South Africa) Cape Town Marathon
  - Winners: (Kenya) Shadrack Kemboi (m) / (Kenya) Isabella Ochichi (f)
- September 20: (Netherlands) Dam tot Damloop
  - Winners: (Kenya) Edwin Kiptoo (m) / (Kenya) Joyce Chepkirui (f)
- October 18: (Spain) Medio Maraton Valencia Trinidad Alfonso 2015
  - Winners: (Kenya) Abraham Cheroben (m) / (Ethiopia) Netsanet Gudeta (f)
- October 18: (United Kingdom) Great Birmingham Run
  - Winners: (United Kingdom) Chris Thompson (m) / (Poland) Dominika Napieraj (f)
- October 25: (France) Marseille Cassis 20km
  - Winners: (Kenya) Edwin Kipyego (m) / (Kenya) Peres Jepchirchir (f)
- October 25: (Italy) Venice Marathon
  - Winners: (Kenya) Julius Chepkwony (m) / (Ethiopia) Ehite Bizuayehu (f)
- November 8: (Lebanon) Beirut Marathon
  - Winners: (Kenya) Jackson Limo (m) / (Morocco) Kaltoum Bouaasayriya
- November 15: (Japan) Saitama Marathon (debut event and women only)
  - Winner: (Ethiopia) Atsede Baysa
- November 15: (Spain) Maraton Valencia Trinidad Alfonso
  - Winners: (Kenya) John Nzau Mwangangi / (Namibia) Beata Naigambo (f)
- December 27: (France) Corrida de Houilles
  - Winners: (Kenya) Cornelius Kangogo (m) / (Ethiopia) Zerfie Limeneh (f)
- December 31: (Spain) San Silvestre Vallecana (final)
  - Winners: (Spain) Sergio Salinero (m) / (Spain) Clara Viñaras (f)

==== Bronze Label ====
- January 18: (United States) Houston Marathon
  - Winners: (Ethiopia) Birhanu Gidefa (m) / (Ethiopia) Yebrqual Melese (f)
- February 22: (Spain) Maraton Ciudad de Sevilla
  - Winners: (Kenya) Lawrence Cherono (m) / (Portugal) Filomena Costa (f)
- March 22: (Chinese Taipei) New Taipei City Wan Jin Shi Marathon
  - Winners: (Kenya) Eliud Barngetuny (m) / (Kenya) Gladys Kipsoi (f)
- April 12: (Italy) Milano City Marathon
  - Winners: (Kenya) Evergreen Kenneth Mungara (m) / (Kenya) Lucy Karimi (f)
- April 12: (United Kingdom) Brighton Marathon
  - Winners: (Kenya) Duncan Maiyo (m) / (Kenya) Pennina Wanjiru (f)
- April 12: (Chile) Santiago Marathon
  - Winners: (Kenya) Luka Rotich Lobuwan (m) / (Peru) Inés Melchor (f)
- April 19: (Japan) Nagano Olympic Commemorative Marathon
  - Winners: (Kenya) Henry Chirchir (m) / (Kenya) Beatrice Toroitich (f)
- May 16: (Nigeria) Okpekpe 10 km Road Race
  - Winners: (Kenya) Alex Oloitiptip Korio (m) / (Kenya) Angela Tanui (f)
- May 17: (Latvia) Riga Marathon
  - Winners: (Ethiopia) Haile Tolossa (m) / (Ethiopia) Meseret Eshetu (f)
- May 31: (United Kingdom) Edinburgh Marathon
  - Winners: (Kenya) Peter Wanjiru (m) / (Kenya) Joan Kigen (f)
- June 13: (France) Corrida de Langueux
  - Winners: (Kenya) Simon Cheprot (m) / (Kenya) Gladys Yator (f)
- September 13: (Denmark) Copenhagen Marathon (half marathon only)
  - Winners: (Kenya) Bedan Karoki (m) / (Kenya) Purity Rionoripo (f)
- September 20: (Russia) Siberian International Marathon
  - Winners: (Kenya) Laban Moiben (m) / (Russia) Albina Mayorova (f)
- October 4: (United Kingdom) Bournemouth Marathon
  - Winners: (Kenya) Boaz Kiprono (m) / (Kenya) Joan Kigen (f)
- October 11: (France) 20 Kilomètres de Paris
  - Winners: (Kenya) Stephen Ogari (m) / (Kenya) Nancy Kimaiyo (f)
- November 8: (France) French Riviera Marathon
  - Winners: (Kenya) Barnabas Kiptum (m) / (Kenya) Rose Jepchumba (f)
- November 15: (France) Boulogne-Billancourt Half Marathon
  - Event cancelled, due to the November 2015 Paris attacks on November 13.
- November 29: Marathon du Gabon (final)
  - Winners: (Kenya) Korio Alex Olotptip (m) / (Kenya) Tanui Anfele (f)

=== IAAF Diamond League ===
- May 15 – September 11: 2015 IAAF Diamond League Schedule
  - May 15: Qatar Athletic Super Grand Prix in Doha
    - The United States won both the gold and overall medal tallies.
  - May 17: Shanghai Golden Grand Prix in China
    - Kenya won both the gold and overall medal tallies.
  - May 30: Prefontaine Classic in Eugene, Oregon
    - Host nation, the United States, won both the gold and overall medal tallies.
  - June 4: Golden Gala in (Italy) Rome
    - The United States won both the gold and overall medal tallies.
  - June 7: British Grand Prix in (United Kingdom) Birmingham
    - Kenya won the gold medal tally. The United States won the overall medal tally.
  - June 11: Bislett Games in (Norway) Oslo
    - Great Britain and Kenya won 2 gold medals each. The United States won the overall medal tally.
  - June 13: Adidas Grand Prix in New York City
    - Host nation, the United States, won both the gold and overall medal tallies.
  - July 4: Meeting Areva in (France) Saint-Denis (Paris)
    - Kenya won the gold medal tally. The United States won the overall medal tally.
  - July 9: Athletissima in (Switzerland) Lausanne
    - The United States won both the gold and overall medal tallies.
  - July 17: Herculis in (Monaco) Fontvieille
    - The United States won both the gold and overall medal tallies.
  - July 24 & 25: London Grand Prix in Great Britain
    - The United States won both the gold and overall medal tallies.
  - July 30: DN Galan in (Sweden) Stockholm
    - The United States won both the gold and overall medal tallies.
  - September 3: Weltklasse Zürich in Switzerland
    - Kenya won the gold medal tally. The United States won the overall medal tally.
  - September 11: Memorial Van Damme in (Belgium) Brussels (final)
    - The United States won both the gold and overall medal tallies.

=== IAAF Cross Country Permit ===
- November 16, 2014 – March 14, 2015: 2015 IAAF Cross Country Permit Schedule
  - November 16, 2014: Cross de Atapuerca in (Spain) Burgos
    - Winners: (Ethiopia) Imane Merga (m) / (Ethiopia) Belaynesh Oljira (f)
  - December 21, 2014: Lotto Cross Cup Brussels in Belgium
    - Winners: (Kenya) Alex Kibet (m) / (Kenya) Sheila Chepngetich Keter (f)
  - January 6: 58th Campaccio-International Cross Country in (Italy) San Giorgio su Legnano
    - Winners: (United States) Dathan Ritzenhein (m) / (Kenya) Janet Kisa (f)
  - January 10: Great Edinburgh International Cross Country in Great Britain
    - Men's 4 km winner: (United States) Garrett Heath
    - Men's 8 km winner: (United States) Chris Derrick
    - Women's 6 km winner: (United Kingdom) Emelia Gorecka
  - January 18: Cross Internacional de Itálica in (Spain) Seville
    - Winners: (Eritrea) Teklemariam Medhin (m) / (Kenya) Emily Chebet (f)
  - January 25: Cross Internacional Juan Muguerza in (Spain) Elgoibar
    - Winners: (Eritrea) Teklemariam Medhin (m) / (Bahrain) Mimi Belete (f)
  - February 8: Chiba International Cross Country in Japan
    - Men's 12 km winner: (Kenya) Charles Ndirangu
    - Women's 8 km winner: (Australia) Zoe Buckman
    - Junior men's 8 km winner: (Japan) Ryoji Tatezawa
    - Junior women's 5 km winner: (Japan) Wakana Kabasawa
  - February 14: IAAF Permit/Athletics Kenya Cross Country in Nairobi
    - Senior Men 12 km winner: (Kenya) Bedan Karoki
    - Senior Women 8 km winner: (Kenya) Faith Chepngetich Kipyegon
    - Junior Men 8 km winner: (Kenya) Dominic Kiptarus
    - Junior Women 6 km winner: (Kenya) Rosefline Chepngetich
  - February 15: Cinque Mulini in (Italy) San Vittore Olona
    - Winners: (Ethiopia) Muktar Edris (m) / (Kenya) Violet Jelagat (f)
  - February 22: Almond Blossom Cross Country in (Portugal) Albufeira
    - Winners: (Moldova) Roman Prodius (m) / (Poland) Dominika Nowakowska (f)
  - March 14: Antrim International Cross Country in Great Britain (final)
    - Winners: (Uganda) Thomas Ayeko (m) / (Ethiopia) Birtukan Fente Alemu (f)

=== IAAF Indoor Permit ===
- January 31 – February 21: 2015 IAAF Indoor Permit Schedule
  - January 31: Weltklasse in Karlsruhe in Germany
    - France and the United States won 2 gold medals each. Germany and the United States won 5 overall medals each.
  - February 1: Russian Winter Meeting in Moscow
    - Host nation, Russia, won both the gold and overall medal tallies.
  - February 7: New Balance Indoor Grand Prix in Boston
    - Host nation, the United States, won both the gold and overall medal tallies.
  - February 19: XL Galan in Stockholm
    - Host nation, Sweden, won both the gold and overall medal tallies.
  - February 21: Birmingham Indoor Grand Prix in Great Britain (final)
    - Host nation, Great Britain, won both the gold and overall medal tallies.

=== IAAF Race Walking Challenge ===
- February 22 – August 30: 2015 IAAF Race Walking Challenge Schedule
  - February 22: Oceania Race Walking Championships in (Australia) Adelaide
    - Winners: (Australia) Jared Tallent (m) / (Australia) Tanya Holliday (f)
  - March 7: Circuito Internacional de Marcha Chihuahua 2015 in Mexico
    - Men's 20 km winner: (Mexico) Eder Sánchez
    - Women's 20 km winner: (Mexico) María Guadalupe González Romero
    - Men's 50 km winner: (Mexico) José Leyver Ojeda
  - March 15: Asian Race Walking Championships in (Japan) Nomi, Ishikawa
    - Winners: (Japan) Yusuke Suzuki (m) (World Record) / (China) HOU Yangbao (f)
  - March 21: Dudinska Paldesjatka in (Slovakia) Dudince
    - Men's 20 km winner: (South Africa) Lebogang Shange
    - Women's 20 km winner: (Italy) Eleonora Anna Giorgi
    - Men's 50 km winner: (Slovakia) Matej Tóth
  - April 18: 24th Grande Prémio Internacional de Rio Maior em Marcha Atlética in Portugal
    - Winners: (Colombia) Éider Arévalo (m) / (China) Liu Hong (f)
  - May 1: 2015 IAAF Race Walking Challenge in (China) Taicang
    - Winners: (China) Chen Ding (m) / (China) DUAN Dandan (f)
  - May 9 & 10: 2015 Pan American Race Walking Cup in (Chile) Arica
    - Mexico won the gold medal tally. Colombia won the overall medal tally.
  - May 17: 2015 European Race Walking Cup in (Spain) Murcia
    - Russia won both the gold and overall medal tallies.
  - June 6: 29th Gran Premio Cantones de La Coruña in Spain
    - Winners: (China) Wang Zhen (m) (Meet Record) / (China) Liu Hong (f) (World Record)
  - August 22–30: Part of the 2015 World Championships in Athletics in Beijing (final)
    - Men's 20 km winner: (Spain) Miguel Ángel López
    - Women's 20 km winner: (China) Liu Hong
    - Men's 50 km winner: (Slovakia) Matej Tóth

=== IAAF Combined Events Challenge ===
- May 8 – September 20: 2015 IAAF Combined Events Challenge Schedule
  - May 8 – 10: Oceania Combined Events Championships in (Australia) Cairns
    - Men's Decathlon winner: (New Zealand) Brent Newdick (7,140 points)
    - Women's Heptathlon winner: (Australia) Sarah Wood (5,052 points)
  - May 15 & 16: Multistars – Trofeo Zerneri Acciai in (Italy) Florence
    - Men's Decathlon winner: (Poland) Pawel Wiesiolek (7,863 points)
    - Women's Heptathlon winner: (Greece) Sofia Yfantidou (5,900 points)
  - May 30 & 31: Hypo-Meeting in (Austria) Götzis
    - Men's Decathlon winner: (Germany) Kai Kazmirek (8,462 points)
    - Women's Heptathlon winner: (Canada) Brianne Theisen-Eaton (6,808 points)
  - June 12 & 13: TNT – Fortuna Meeting in (Czech Republic) Kladno
    - Men's Decathlon winner: (Czech Republic) Marek Lukas (7,892 points)
    - Women's Heptathlon winner: (Ukraine) Hanna Kasyanova (6,277 points)
  - June 19 & 20: Combined Events Capital Cup in (Canada) Ottawa
    - Men's Decathlon winner: (Cuba) Yordanis García (7,977 points)
    - Women's Heptathlon winner: (Cuba) Yorgelis Rodríguez (6,068 points)
  - June 25–28: 2015 USA Outdoor Track and Field Championships in (United States) Eugene, Oregon
    - Men's Decathlon winner: (United States) Trey Hardee (8,725 points)
    - Women's Heptathlon winner: (United States) Barbara Nwaba (6,500 points)
  - June 27 & 28: Mehrkampf-Meeting Ratingen in Germany
    - Men's Decathlon winner: (Germany) Michael Schrader (8,419 points)
    - Women's Heptathlon winner: (Netherlands) Anouk Vetter (6,387 points)
  - July 4 & 5: European Combined Events Cup Super League in (France) Aubagne
    - Men's Decathlon winner: (Russia) Ilya Shkurenyov (8,378 points)
    - Women's Heptathlon winner: (Ukraine) Alina Fyodorova (6,278 points)
  - July 4 & 5: European Combined Events Cup First League and Second League in (Poland) Inowrocław
    - First League Men's Decathlon winner: (Norway) Martin Roe (7,875 points)
    - First League Women's Heptathlon winner: (Poland) Karolina Tymińska (6,174 points)
    - Second League Men's Decathlon winner: (Finland) Joli Koivu (7,462 points)
    - Second League Women's Heptathlon winner: (Latvia) Laura Ikauniece-Admidiņa (6,470 points)
  - July 8–12: Part of the 2015 Summer Universiade in (South Korea) Gwangju
    - Men's Decathlon winner: (Belgium) Thomas van der Plaetsen (7,952 points)
    - Women's Heptathlon winner: (Germany) Anna Maiwald (6,111 points)
  - July 18–26: Part of the 2015 Pan American Games in (Canada) Toronto
    - Men's Decathlon winner: (Canada) Damian Warner (8,659 points)
    - Women's Heptathlon winner: (Cuba) Yorgelis Rodríguez (6,332 points)
  - August 22–30: Part of the 2015 World Championships in Athletics in (China) Beijing
    - Men's Decathlon winner: (United States) Ashton Eaton (9,045 points) World Record
    - Women's Heptathlon winner: (United Kingdom) Jessica Ennis-Hill (6,669 points)
  - September 19 & 20: Décastar in (France) Talence (final)
    - Men's Decathlon winner: (South Africa) Willem Coertzen (8,187 points)
    - Women's Heptathlon winner: (Hungary) Györgyi Zsivoczky-Farkas (6,306 points)

=== IAAF World Challenge ===
- March 21 – September 13: 2015 IAAF World Challenge Schedule
  - March 21: Melbourne Track Classic in Australia
    - Host nation, Australia, won both the gold and overall medal tallies.
  - May 9: Jamaica International Invitational in Kingston
    - The United States won both the gold and overall medal tallies.
  - May 10: Golden Grand Prix in Kawasaki
    - Host nation, Japan, the United States, and Ukraine won 2 gold medals each. The United States won the overall medal tally.
  - May 20: IAAF World Challenge Beijing in China
    - Host nation, China, and the United States won 3 gold medals each. The United States won the overall medal tally.
  - May 23: Meeting Grand Prix IAAF de Dakar in Senegal
    - Cuba, Nigeria and the United States won 2 gold medals each. Nigeria, the United States, South Africa, and Ukraine won 4 overall medals each.
  - May 24: Fanny Blankers-Koen Games in Hengelo
    - Host nation, the Netherlands, and Poland won 3 gold medals each. Great Britain won the overall medal tally.
  - May 26: Golden Spike Ostrava in the Czech Republic
    - Poland won the gold medal tally. Host nation, the Czech Republic, and Poland won 7 overall medals each.
  - June 14: Meeting International Mohammed VI d'Athlétisme de Rabat in Morocco
    - France won the gold medal tally. Kenya won the overall medal tally.
  - July 11: Meeting de Atletismo Madrid in Spain
    - Ethiopia and the United States won 2 gold medals each. The United States won the overall medal tally.
  - September 6: ISTAF Berlin in Germany
    - Germany, Kenya, Poland, and the United States won 2 gold medals each. The United States won the overall medal tally.
  - September 8: Hanžeković Memorial in (Croatia) Zagreb
    - The United States won the gold medal tally. The United States, Germany, and Jamaica won 5 overall medals each.
  - September 13: Rieti Meeting in Italy (final)
    - Jamaica won the gold medal tally. Ukraine won the overall medal tally.

=== IAAF Hammer Throw Challenge ===
- March 21 – September 13: 2015 IAAF Hammer Throw Challenge Calendar
  - March 21: Part of the Melbourne Track Classic in Australia
    - Winner: (Australia) Matthew Denny
  - May 10: Part of the Golden Grand Prix in (Japan) Kawasaki
    - Winner: (Slovakia) Martina Hrašnová
  - May 20: Part of the IAAF World Challenge Beijing in China
    - Winner: (Poland) Anita Włodarczyk
  - May 23: Part of the IAAF World Challenge Dakar in Senegal
    - Winner: (United States) Gwen Berry
  - May 26: Part of the Golden Spike Ostrava in the Czech Republic
    - Men's winner: (Poland) Paweł Fajdek
    - Women's winner: (Poland) Anita Włodarczyk
  - June 14: Part of the Meeting International Mohammed VI d'Athlétisme de Rabat in Morocco
    - Winner: (Poland) Paweł Fajdek
  - June 25: Paavo Nurmi Games in (Finland) Turku
    - Winner: (Poland) Paweł Fajdek
  - July 7: István Gyulai Memorial in (Hungary) Székesfehérvár
    - Winner: (Poland) Paweł Fajdek
  - July 18: Brothers Znamensky Memorial in (Russia) Moscow
    - Men's winner: (Tajikistan) Dilshod Nazarov
    - Women's winner: (Russia) Mariya Bespalova
  - July 22: Karlstad Grand Prix in Sweden
    - Winner: (Tajikistan) Dilshod Nazarov
  - August 9: Janusz Kusociński Memorial in (Poland) Szczecin
    - Men's winner: (Poland) Paweł Fajdek
    - Women's winner: (Poland) Anita Włodarczyk
  - August 22–30: Part of the 2015 World Championships in Athletics in (China) Beijing
    - Men's winner: (Poland) Paweł Fajdek
    - Women's winner: (Poland) Anita Włodarczyk
  - September 6: Part of the ISTAF Berlin in Germany
    - Winner: (Germany) Kathrin Klaas
  - September 13: Part of the Rieti Meeting in Italy (final)
    - Winner: (Poland) Paweł Fajdek

=== IPC Athletics Grand Prix ===
- February 22 – July 26: 2015 IPC Athletics Grand Prix
  - February 22 – 25: 7th Fazaa International Athletics Competition in (United Arab Emirates) Dubai
  - March 6–8: 2015 Queensland State Championships in (Australia) Brisbane
  - March 23–25: 9th Tunis International Meeting in Tunis
    - Host nation, Tunisia, and Algeria won 28 gold medals each. Algeria won the overall medal tally.
  - April 18 – 20: 3rd China Open Athletics Championships in Beijing
  - May 13 – 17: 2015 Desert Challenge Games in (United States) Mesa, Arizona
  - May 29 – 31: 2015 ParAthletics in (Switzerland) Nottwil
  - June 12–14: 2015 Italian Open Championships in (Italy) Grosseto
  - June 19–21: 2015 Berlin Open in Germany
  - July 26: 2015 IPC Athletics Grand Prix Final in (United Kingdom) London
