= List of winners of the Amsterdam Marathon =

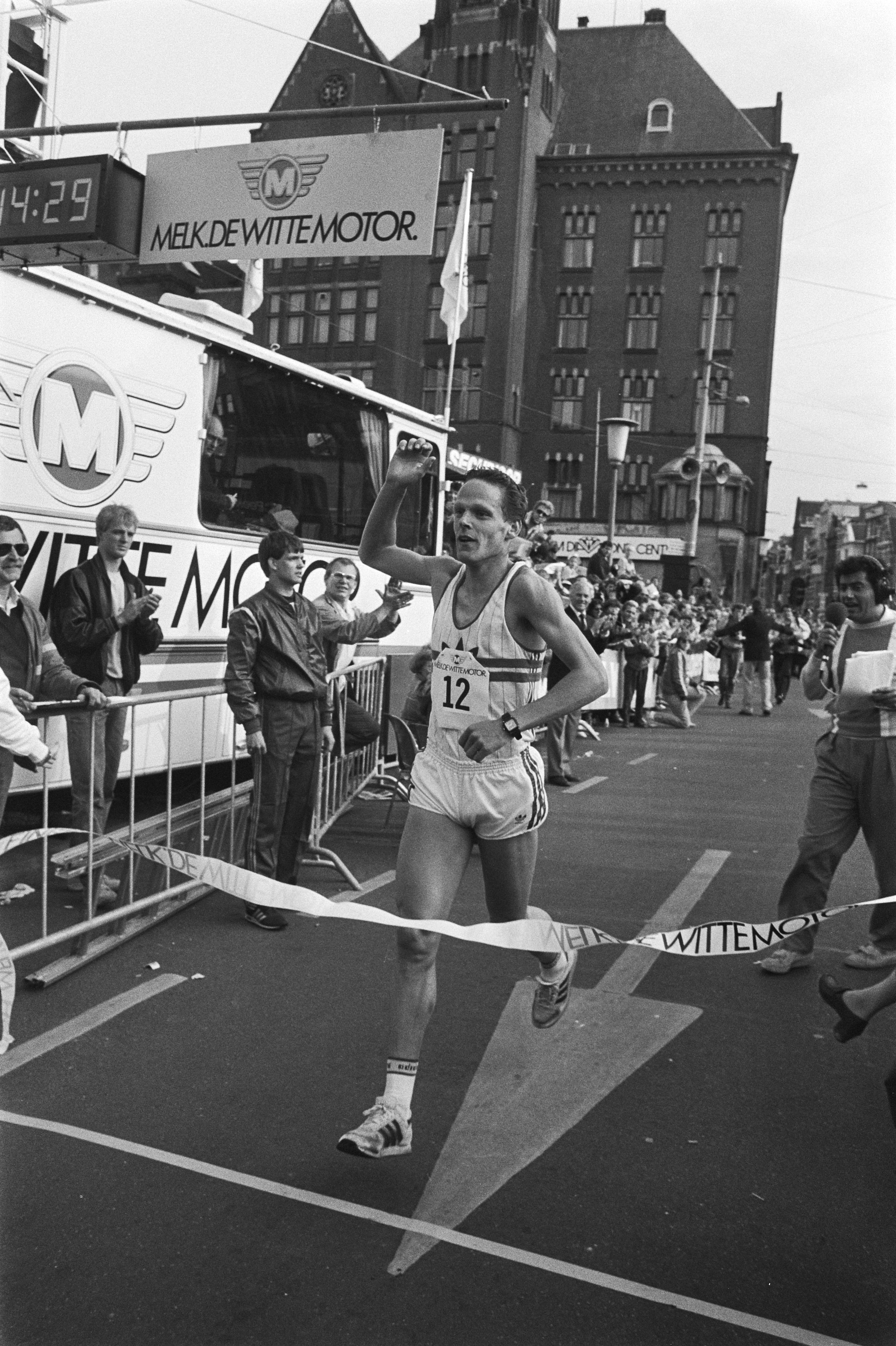
Gerard Nijboer at the finish line of the 1984 Amsterdam Marathon. He has the most victories in this marathon, winning in 1980, 1984, 1988, and 1989.

The Amsterdam Marathon is a road race of 42.195 km (26 mi 385 yd) across the city of Amsterdam in the Netherlands, contested by men and women annually since 1975. The race was initially held in the spring (April or May), but since 1991, it has been held in the autumn (September to November). In its 52-year existence, the event has been cancelled twice: in 1978, after the sponsor withdrew, and in 2020, due to the COVID-19 pandemic in the Netherlands.

In the inaugural edition of 1975, Jørgen Jensen was the men's winner, in a time of 2:16:51 (h : m : s), and Plonie Scheringa was the women's winner, finishing in 3:13:38. Gerard Nijboer won the 1980 race in 2:09:01, which was recognized as a world-best marathon performance by the Association of Road Racing Statisticians until 1981 and remained a Dutch marathon record until 2003. The current men's course record (CR) is 2:03:31, set by Geoffrey Toroitich Kipchumba in 2025, and the current women's course record is 2:16:10, set by Buze Diriba in 2026.

Nijboer won the race four times, more than any other runner, in 1980, 1984, 1988, and 1989. Wilson Chebet won three times consecutively, from 2011 to 2013. The two-time winners in the men's category are Ferenc Szekeres, Cor Vriend, Sammy Korir, Bernard Kipyego, Lawrence Cherono, and Tsegaye Getachew. In the women's category Scheringa, Marja Wokke, and Tadelech Bekele have each won twice. Runners representing Kenya, Ethiopia, and the Netherlands have been the most successful in winning the marathon, with 22 victories by Kenyan male runners, 18 victories by Ethiopian female runners, and 12 victories by Dutch female runners.

== Men's winners ==
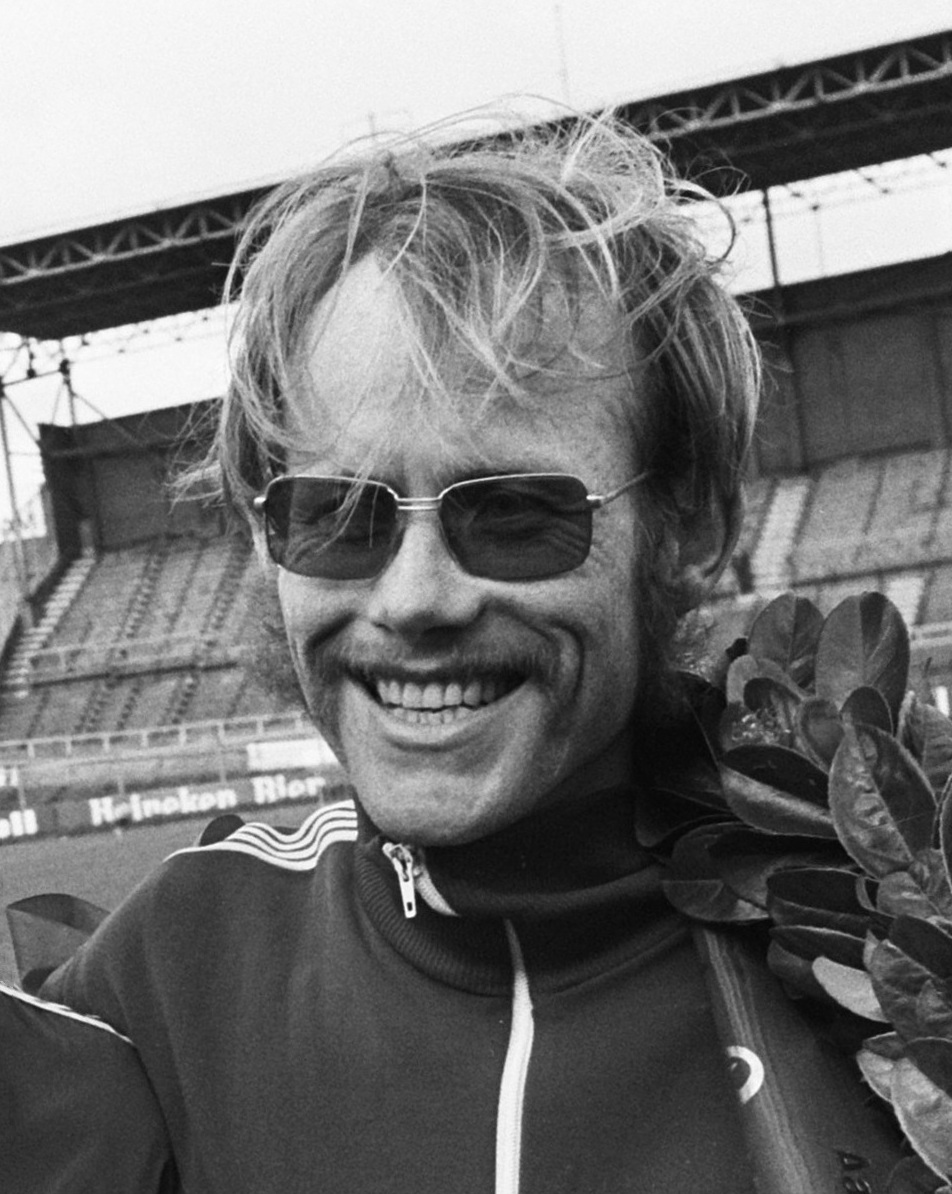
First winner Jørgen Jensen after his victory in 1975

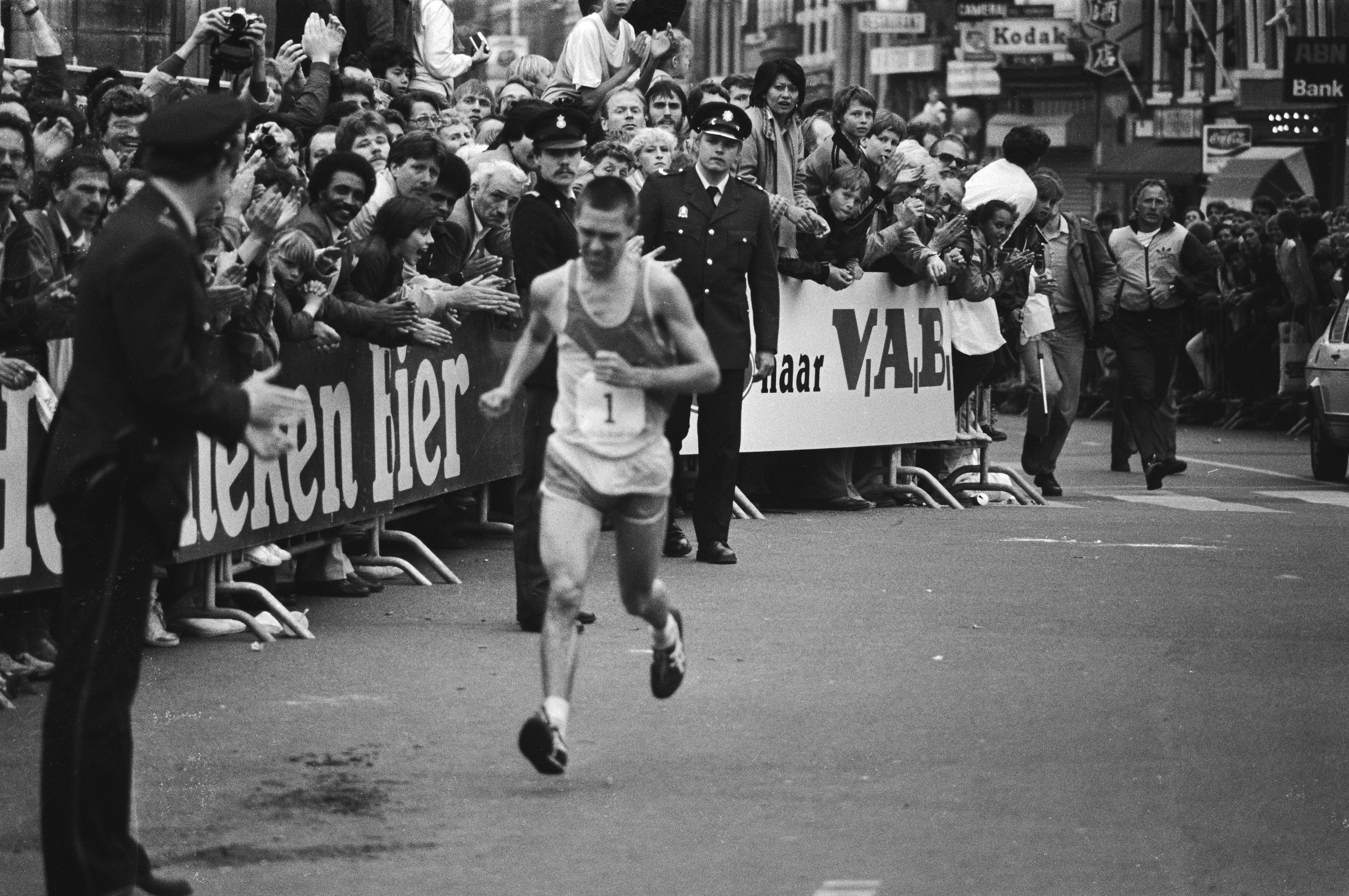
Cor Vriend during his second winning race in 1983

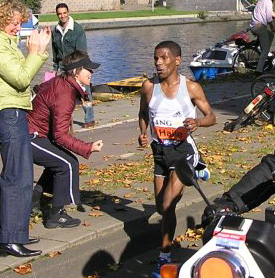
Haile Gebrselassie during his winning race in 2005

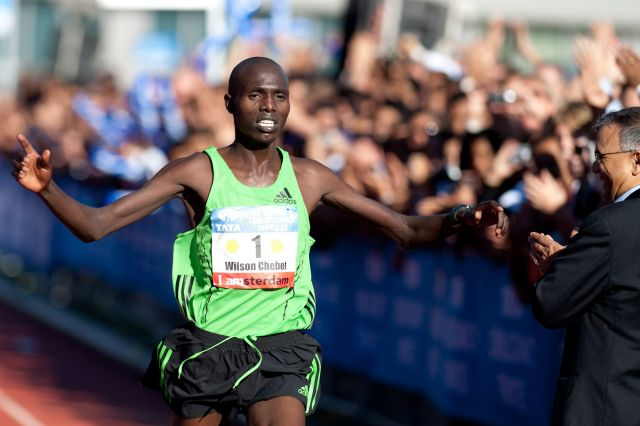
Wilson Chebet during his first winning race in 2011

Men's winners of the Amsterdam Marathon
Date	Athlete	Country	Time	Note	Ref.
3 May 1975	Jørgen Jensen	Denmark	2:16:51	CR	
8 May 1976	Karel Lismont	Belgium	2:18:48		
21 May 1977	Bill Rodgers	United States	2:12:47	CR	
20 May 1978	Marathon cancelled (Note: The marathon was cancelled after the sponsor withdrew and the organization could not find a new sponsor in time.)				
19 May 1979	Ferenc Szekeres	Hungary	2:14:46		
26 April 1980	Gerard Nijboer	Netherlands	2:09:01	CR	
9 May 1981	Ferenc Szekeres	Hungary	2:18:11		
8 May 1982	Cor Vriend	Netherlands	2:12:15		
7 May 1983	Cor Vriend	Netherlands	2:13:41		
12 May 1984	Gerard Nijboer	Netherlands	2:14:28		
12 May 1985	Jose Reveyn	Belgium	2:19:24		
11 May 1986	William Vanhuylenbroek	Belgium	2:14:46		
10 May 1987	John Burra	Tanzania	2:12:40		
7 May 1988	Gerard Nijboer	Netherlands	2:12:38		
7 May 1989	Gerard Nijboer	Netherlands	2:13:52		
13 May 1990	Zerehune Gizaw	Ethiopia	2:11:52		
15 September 1991	Tesfaye Tafa	Ethiopia	2:13:26		
27 September 1992	Inocencio Miranda	Mexico	2:14:58		
26 September 1993	Kenichi Suzuki	Japan	2:11:56		
25 September 1994	Tesfaye Eticha	Ethiopia	2:15:56		
24 September 1995	Hisayuki Okawa	Japan	2:14:00		
3 November 1996	Joseph Chebet	Kenya	2:10:57		
2 November 1997	Sammy Korir	Kenya	2:08:24	CR	
1 November 1998	Sammy Korir	Kenya	2:08:13	CR	
17 October 1999	Fred Kiprop	Kenya	2:06:47	CR	
15 October 2000	Javier Cortés	Spain	2:08:57		
21 October 2001	Driss El Himer	France	2:07:02		
20 October 2002	Benjamin Kimutai	Kenya	2:07:26		
19 October 2003	William Kipsang	Kenya	2:06:39	CR	
17 October 2004	Robert Cheboror	Kenya	2:06:23	CR	
16 October 2005	Haile Gebrselassie	Ethiopia	2:06:20	CR	
15 October 2006	Solomon Busendich	Kenya	2:08:52		
21 October 2007	Emmanuel Mutai	Kenya	2:06:29		
19 October 2008	Paul Kirui	Kenya	2:07:52		
18 October 2009	Gilbert Yegon	Kenya	2:06:18	CR	
17 October 2010	Getu Feleke	Ethiopia	2:05:44	CR	
16 October 2011	Wilson Chebet	Kenya	2:05:53		
21 October 2012	Wilson Chebet	Kenya	2:05:41	CR	
20 October 2013	Wilson Chebet	Kenya	2:05:36	CR	
19 October 2014	Bernard Kipyego	Kenya	2:06:22		
18 October 2015	Bernard Kipyego	Kenya	2:06:19		
16 October 2016	Daniel Wanjiru	Kenya	2:05:21	CR	
15 October 2017	Lawrence Cherono	Kenya	2:05:09	CR	
21 October 2018	Lawrence Cherono	Kenya	2:04:06	CR	
20 October 2019	Vincent Kipchumba	Kenya	2:05:09		
18 October 2020	Marathon cancelled (Note: The marathon was cancelled due to the COVID-19 pandemic.)				
17 October 2021	Tamirat Tola	Ethiopia	2:03:39	CR	
16 October 2022	Tsegaye Getachew	Ethiopia	2:04:49		
15 October 2023	Joshua Belet	Kenya	2:04:18		
20 October 2024	Tsegaye Getachew	Ethiopia	2:05:38		
19 October 2025	Geoffrey Toroitich Kipchumba	Kenya	2:03:31	CR	
18 October 2026	Lemi Berhanu	Ethiopia	2:03:33		

== Women's winners ==
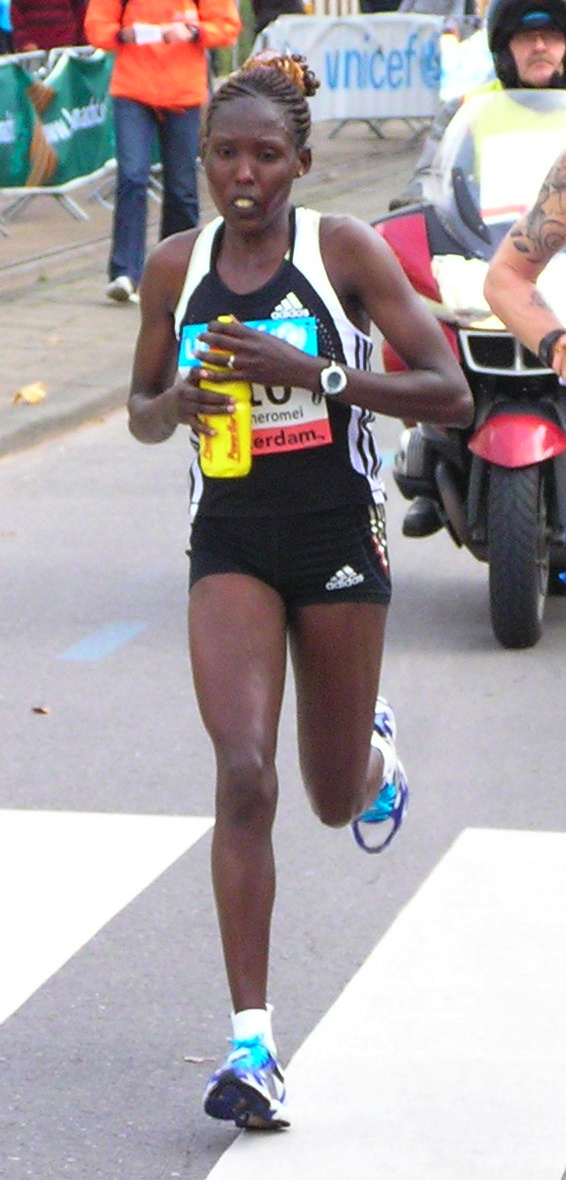
Lydia Cheromei during her winning race in 2008

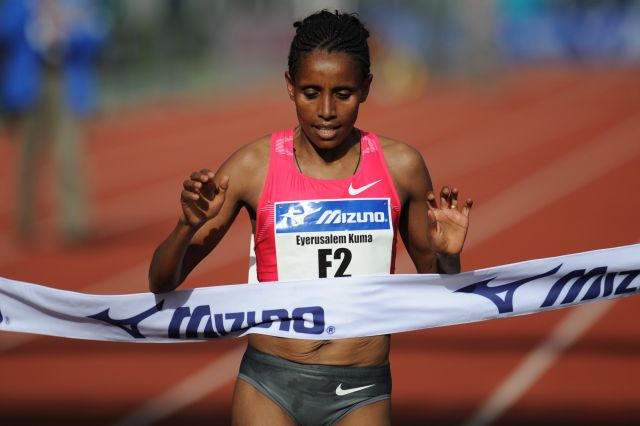
Eyerusalem Kuma at the finish of her winning race in 2009

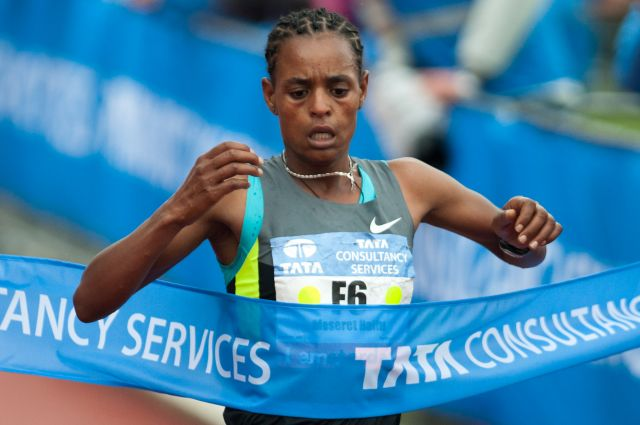
Meseret Hailu at the finish of her winning race in 2012

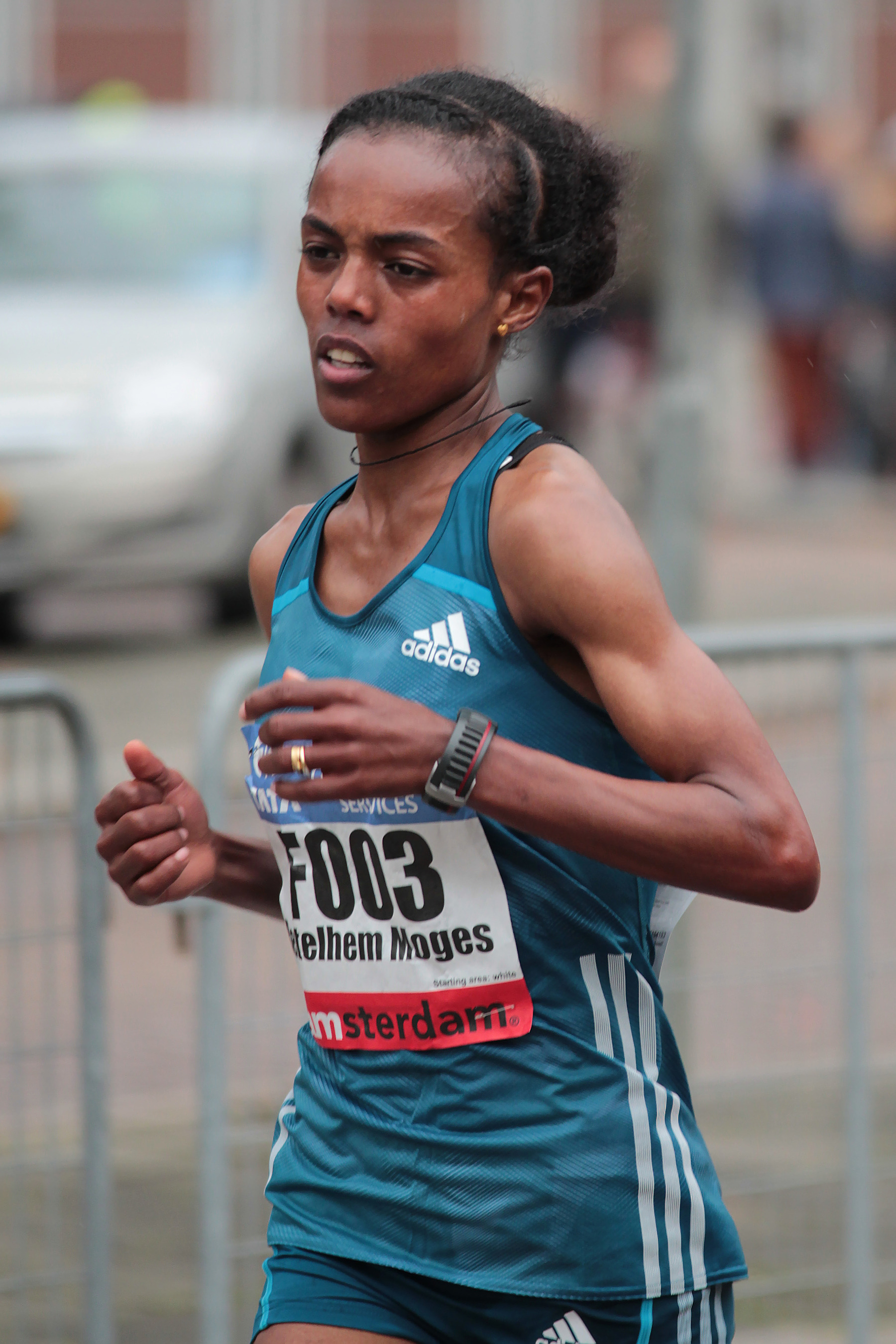
Betelhem Moges during her winning race in 2014

Women's winners of the Amsterdam Marathon
Date	Athlete	Country	Time	Note	Ref.
3 May 1975	Plonie Scheringa	Netherlands	3:13:38	CR	
8 May 1976	Corrie Konings	Netherlands	3:24:31		
21 May 1977	Plonie Scheringa	Netherlands	3:28:24		
20 May 1978	Marathon cancelled				
19 May 1979	Ria Harmens (Note: According to a news report published in 1979, two days after the race, Ria Harmens was the first woman to finish the race of 1979, before Marianne Nieuwenhuis in second place and Rina Kossen in third place. This finishing order is corroborated by a booklet with women's long-distance running results from 1979 published in circa 1979/1980. On winners lists published in 1985, 2017, and 2023, Marianne Nieuwenhuis is listed as women's winner of the race of 1979 and there is no mention of other female competitors. For this table, the sources from 1979/1980 are used, because they give more information about the women's ranking and were published closer to the race than the sources from 1985, 2017, and 2023.)	Netherlands	3:21:40		
26 April 1980	Marja Wokke	Netherlands	2:40:15	CR	
9 May 1981	Marja Wokke	Netherlands	2:43:38		
8 May 1982	Annie van Stiphout	Netherlands	2:37:28	CR	
7 May 1983	Antónia Ladányiné	Hungary	2:43:47		
12 May 1984	Eefje van Wissen	Netherlands	2:43:51		
12 May 1985	Carolien Lucas	Netherlands	2:47:15		
11 May 1986	Teresa Kidd	Ireland	2:46:20		
10 May 1987	Adriana Andreescu	Romania	2:36:21	CR	
7 May 1988	Elena Murgoci	Romania	2:41:56		
7 May 1989	Gabriela Gorzyńska	Poland	2:47:16		
13 May 1990	Renata Kokowska	Poland	2:35:31	CR	
15 September 1991	Mieke Hombergen	Netherlands	2:41:14		
27 September 1992	Paulina Grigorenko	Russia	2:50:41		
26 September 1993	Yoshiko Yamamoto	Japan	2:29:12	CR	
25 September 1994	Barbara Kamp	Netherlands	2:51:57		
24 September 1995	Agnes Hijman	Netherlands	2:48:57		
3 November 1996	Nadezhda Ilyina	Russia	2:34:35		
2 November 1997	Elfenesh Alemu	Ethiopia	2:37:36		
1 November 1998	Catherina McKiernan	Ireland	2:22:23	CR	
17 October 1999	Lornah Kiplagat	Kenya	2:25:29		
15 October 2000	Abeba Tolla	Ethiopia	2:29:54		
21 October 2001	Shitaye Gemechu	Ethiopia	2:28:40		
20 October 2002	Gete Wami	Ethiopia	2:22:19	CR	
19 October 2003	Helena Sampaio	Portugal	2:28:06		
17 October 2004	Helena Javornik	Slovenia	2:27:33		
16 October 2005	Kutre Dulecha	Ethiopia	2:30:06		
15 October 2006	Rose Cheruiyot	Kenya	2:28:26		
21 October 2007	Magdaline Chemjor	Kenya	2:28:16		
19 October 2008	Lydia Cheromei	Kenya	2:25:57		
18 October 2009	Eyerusalem Kuma	Ethiopia	2:27:43		
17 October 2010	Alice Timbilil	Kenya	2:25:03		
16 October 2011	Tiki Gelana	Ethiopia	2:22:08	CR	
21 October 2012	Meseret Hailu	Ethiopia	2:21:09	CR	
20 October 2013	Valentine Kipketer	Kenya	2:23:02		
19 October 2014	Betelhem Moges	Ethiopia	2:28:35		
18 October 2015	Joyce Chepkirui	Kenya	2:24:11		
16 October 2016	Meselech Melkamu	Ethiopia	2:23:21		
15 October 2017	Tadelech Bekele	Ethiopia	2:21:54		
21 October 2018	Tadelech Bekele	Ethiopia	2:23:14		
20 October 2019	Degitu Azimeraw	Ethiopia	2:19:26	CR	
18 October 2020	Marathon cancelled				
17 October 2021	Angela Tanui	Kenya	2:17:57	CR	
16 October 2022	Almaz Ayana	Ethiopia	2:17:20	CR	
15 October 2023	Meseret Belete	Ethiopia	2:18:21		
20 October 2024	Yalemzerf Yehualaw	Ethiopia	2:16:52	CR	
19 October 2025	Aynalem Desta	Ethiopia	2:17:38		
18 October 2026	Buze Diriba	Ethiopia	2:16:10	CR	

== Victories by country ==
Number of victories by country
Country	Men	Women	Total
Kenya	22	8	30
Ethiopia	9	18	27
Netherlands	6	12	18
Belgium	3	0	3
Hungary	2	1	3
Japan	2	1	3
Ireland	0	2	2
Poland	0	2	2
Romania	0	2	2
Russia	0	2	2
Denmark	1	0	1
France	1	0	1
Mexico	1	0	1
Portugal	0	1	1
Slovenia	0	1	1
Spain	1	0	1
Tanzania	1	0	1
United States	1	0	1
Updated for the 2026 edition
