= Barsosio =

Barsosio is a surname of Kenyan origin. Notable people with the surname include:

- Agnes Jeruto Barsosio (born 1983), Kenyan marathon runner
- Florence Barsosio (born 1976), Kenyan marathon runner
- Sally Barsosio (born 1978), Kenyan long-distance track runner
- Stella Barsosio, Kenyan long-distance runner
