= Hisayuki =

- Gender: Male

Origin
- Origin: Japanese
- Meaning: Different meanings depending on the kanji used

Hisayuki (written: 久行, 久之 or 永行) is a masculine Japanese given name. Notable people with the name include:

- Hisayuki Machii (町井 久之; 1923–2002), Japanese yakuza member
- Hisayuki Okawa (大川 久之; born 1971), Japanese long-distance runner
- Hisayuki Sasaki (佐々木 久行; 1964–2013), Japanese golfer
- Hisayuki Toriumi (鳥海 永行; 1941–2009), Japanese anime director, screenwriter and writer

Hisayuki (written: 久行) is also a Japanese surname. Notable people with the name include:

- Hirokazu Hisayuki (久行 宏和), Japanese animator and character designer
