= Stephen Kiprop =

Kenyan long-distance runner

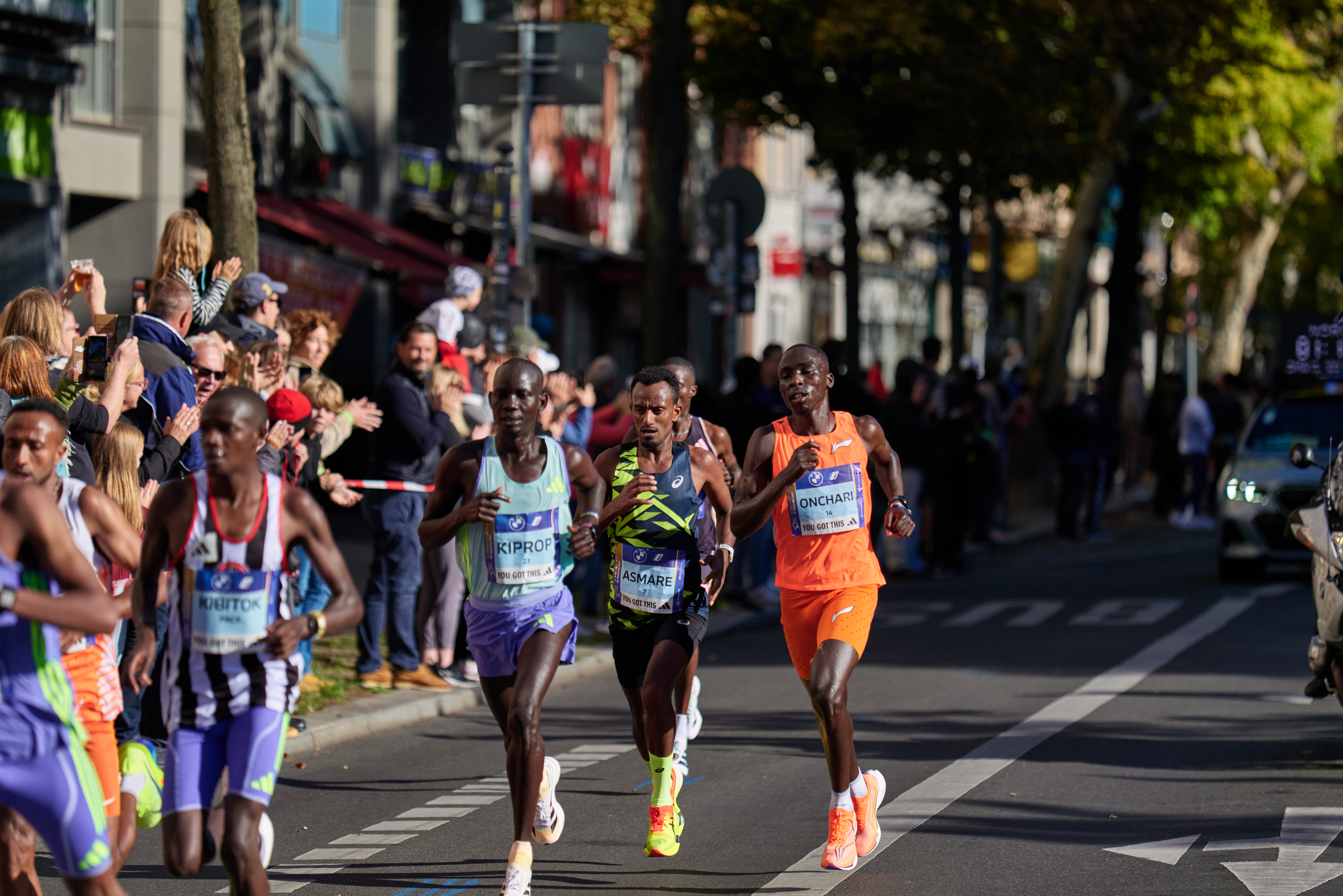
- Kiprop (third from the right) during the 2024 Berlin Marathon

Personal information
- Nationality: Kenyan
- Born: Stephen Kiprop; 8 September 1999 (age 26) Baringo County, Kenya
- Occupation: long-distance runner
- Years active: 2018–present

Sport
- Country: Kenya
- Sport: Athletics
- Events: Marathon, Half marathon, 15K road

Achievements and titles
- Personal bests: Marathon: 2:03:37 (2024); Half marathon: 58:42 (2019); 15 km road: 42:16 (2018)

Stephen Kiprop (born 8 September 1999) is a Kenyan long-distance runner specializing in marathon and half marathon events. He has quickly risen to prominence in road racing, achieving top results in major international competitions.

== Career ==
Stephen Kiprop has established himself as one of the fastest road runners in the world. His personal best in the half marathon is 58:42, set in February 2019 at the Ras Al Khaimah Half Marathon, where he equaled the course record. This time placed him among the fastest half marathoners of all time. He also holds a personal best of 42:16 for the 15-kilometre road race, achieved in May 2018.

Kiprop made his major marathon debut at the 50th edition of the Berlin Marathon. His marathon personal best is 2:03:37, set at the Berlin Marathon on September 29, 2024, where he finished fourth. This race saw four men run under 2:04 for the first time in Berlin's history.

In April 2024, Kiprop won the Daegu Marathon in South Korea with a time of 2:07:04. He also competed in the 2023 Valencia Marathon, finishing with 2:09:23.

Kiprop has also gained experience as a pacemaker, notably for Eliud Kipchoge in the 2019 London Marathon, where he helped Kipchoge reach the halfway mark in 1:01:37.

== Achievements ==
Year	Race	City	Position	Time
2018	Ústí nad Labem Half Marathon	Ústí nad Labem	1st	1:00:15
2018	Olomouc Half Marathon	Olomouc	1st	1:00:46
2019	Ras Al Khaimah Half Marathon	Ras Al Khaimah	1st	58:42 (PB)
2023	Valencia Marathon	Valencia	39th	2:09:23
2024	Daegu Marathon	Daegu	1st	2:07:04
2024	2024 Berlin Marathon	Berlin	4th	2:03:37 (PB)
