= Philemon Limo =

Kenyan long-distance runner (born 1985)

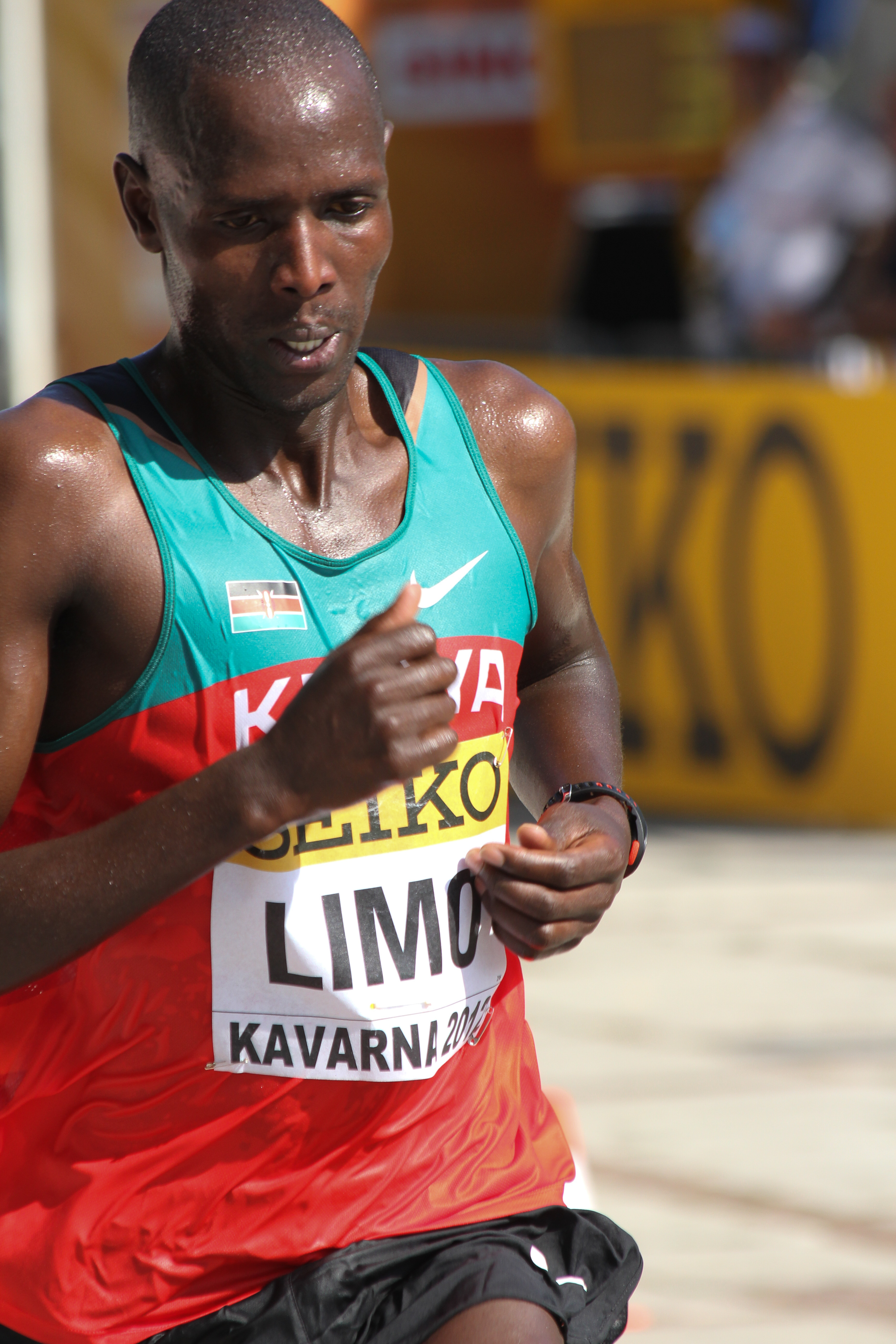
Philemon Kimeli Limo at the 2012 World Half Marathon Championships in Kavarna, Bulgaria

Philemon Kimeli Limo (born 2 August 1985) is a Kenyan professional long-distance runner who competes in cross country running and road running competitions. He has a half marathon best of 59:30 minutes and a marathon best of 2:09:25 hours. He typically competes on the Italian road circuit and has won the Roma-Ostia and Prague Half Marathons.

Hailing from Marakwet District, Kenya, he began to make his mark domestically in 2009 as he was the runner-up at the high level Rift Valley Province Cross Country Championships. In his European debut in March 2010, he came third at the Stramilano Half Marathon, completing the distance in a time of 1:01:34 hours to finish behind Moses Mosop and Silas Kipruto. He was the pacemaker for the 2010 European Cup 10000m and went on to record a 5000 metres personal best of 13:18.97 minutes at the Memorial Primo Nebiolo later that June. He won a 10 km race in Rennes, recording a time which ranked him in the top ten for the distance that year. He defeated all comers in the Marseille-Cassis Classique in October that year.

Representing Kenya Police, he gained his first national selection in 2011 with a fourth-place finish at the Kenyan National Cross Country Championships. On his international debut at the 2011 IAAF World Cross Country Championships in March, he took seventh place in the men's senior race – the fifth Kenyan to cross the line. He proved himself on the roads a month later at the Prague Half Marathon as he won the race with a sub-one hour timing, setting the fastest time ever on Czech soil with his finishing time of 59:30 minutes. A runner-up finish at the Giro Media Blenio came four weeks later. He won the men's title at the World 10K Bangalore in June, where he finished in 28:01 minutes, and set a course record and personal best of 27:34 min to win the Prague Metro 10K. He returned to the Marseille-Cassis race to defend his title, but was beaten into third place. He came fifth behind Sammy Kitwara at the Delhi Half Marathon in November and started his cross country season with a win at the Venta de Baños Cross a month after.

He was within two seconds of his best at the Roma-Ostia Half Marathon and won by a twenty-second margin. returned to defend his title at the Prague Half Marathon in 2012, but finished third in a time of 60:03 minutes. Limo made his marathon debut at the Prague International Marathon in May and recorded a time of 2:09:25 hours for third, although he slowed significantly in the final stages. In 2013 he managed only tenth at the Prague Half Marathon, but won the Ústí nad Labem Half Marathon.
