= Vincent Kipchumba =

Kenyan long-distance runner

Vincent Adam Kipchumba
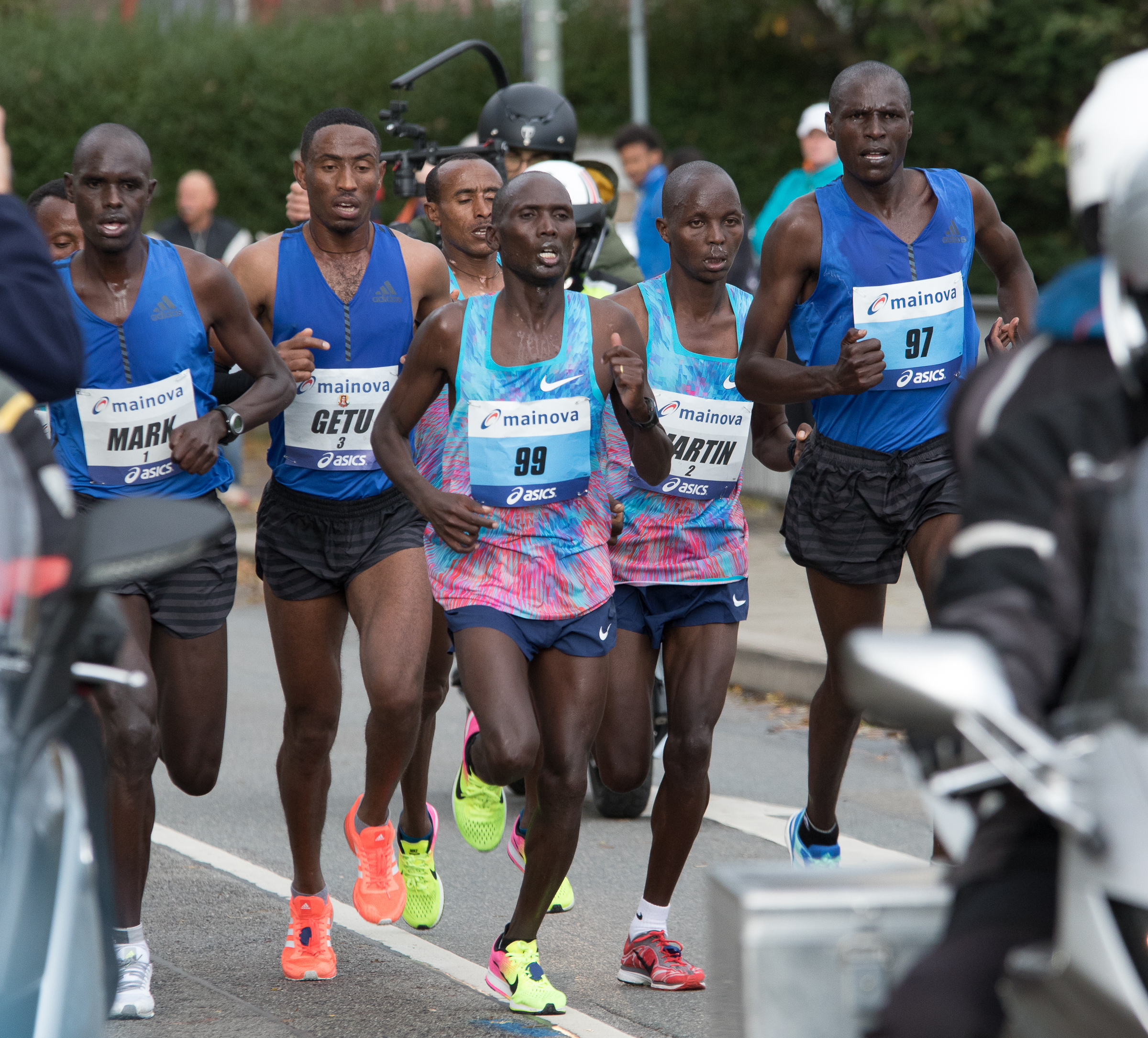
- Vincent Kipchumba (97)

Personal information
- Born: 3 August 1990 (age 35)

Sport
- Country: Kenya
- Sport: Athletics
- Event: Long-distance running

Vincent Kipchumba (born 3 August 1990) is a Kenyan long-distance runner. In 2019, he won the Amsterdam Marathon with a time of 2:05:09.

In 2019, he also won the Adana Half Marathon and the Vienna City Marathon.

== Achievements ==
| Year | Competition | Venue | Position | Event | Notes |
Representing Kenya
| 2017 | Berlin Half Marathon | Berlin, Germany | 2nd | Half marathon | 1:00:32 |
| 2019 | Adana Half Marathon | Adana, Turkey | 1st | Half marathon | 1:02:12 |
| 2019 | Vienna City Marathon | Vienna, Austria | 1st | Marathon | 2:06:56 |
| 2019 | Amsterdam Marathon | Amsterdam, Netherlands | 1st | Marathon | 2:05:09 |
| 2020 | London Marathon | London, United Kingdom | 2nd | Marathon | 2:05:42 |
| 2021 | London Marathon | London, United Kingdom | 2nd | Marathon | 2:04:28 |
