= Barselius Kipyego =

Kenyan long-distance runner

Sport
- Country: Kenya
- Sport: Long-distance running
Medal record
World Championships (HM)
Silver medal – second place	2018 Valencia	Team

Barselius Kipyego (born 1993) is a Kenyan long-distance runner. He won the silver medal at the 2018 World Half Marathon Championships in the team event together with Geoffrey Kamworor and Leonard Barsoton.

Kipyego also won several half marathon events: the half marathon event at the Nairobi Marathon in 2014, the Adana Half Marathon in 2015 and 2016, the České Budějovice Half Marathon in 2016 and the Ústí nad Labem Half Marathon in 2016 and 2017. As of 27 December 2019 he holds the course records in both the Adana Half Marathon and Ústí nad Labem Half Marathon events.
