= 2015 Berlin Marathon =

42nd Berlin Marathon
- Venue: Berlin, Germany
- Dates: 27 September 2015

Champions
- Men: Eliud Kipchoge (2:04:00)
- Women: Gladys Cherono (2:19:25)

The 2015 Berlin Marathon was the 42nd edition of the Berlin Marathon. The marathon took place in Berlin, Germany, on 27 September 2015 and was the fourth World Marathon Majors race of the year.

The men's race was won by Kenyan athlete Eliud Kipchoge in 2:04:00 hours and the women's race was won by Gladys Cherono of Kenya in a time of 2:19:25 hours.

== Results ==
=== Men ===
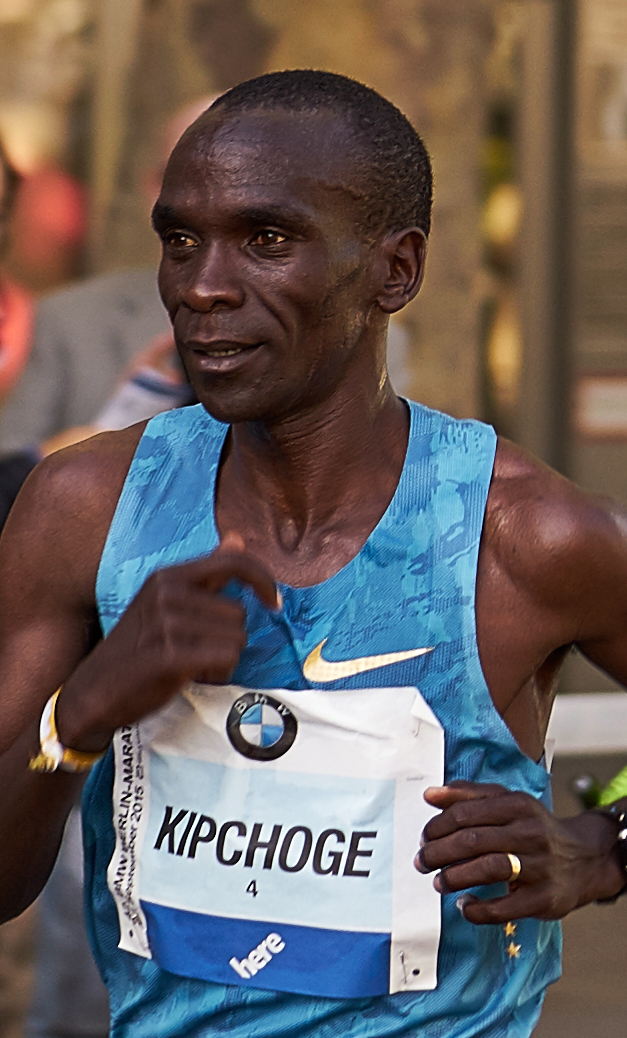
Eliud Kipchoge

Position	Athlete	Nationality	Time
1st place, gold medalist(s)	Eliud Kipchoge	Kenya	2:04:00 PB
2nd place, silver medalist(s)	Eliud Kiptanui	Kenya	2:05:21 PB
3rd place, bronze medalist(s)	Feyisa Lilesa	Ethiopia	2:06:57
4	Emmanuel Mutai	Kenya	2:07:46
5	Geoffrey Mutai	Kenya	2:09:29
6	Reid Coolsaet	Canada	2:10:28 PB
7	Koen Naert	Belgium	2:10:31 PB
8	Yared Shegumo	Poland	2:10:47
9	Koji Gokaya	Japan	2:10:58
10	Scott Overall	United Kingdom	2:11:24

=== Women ===
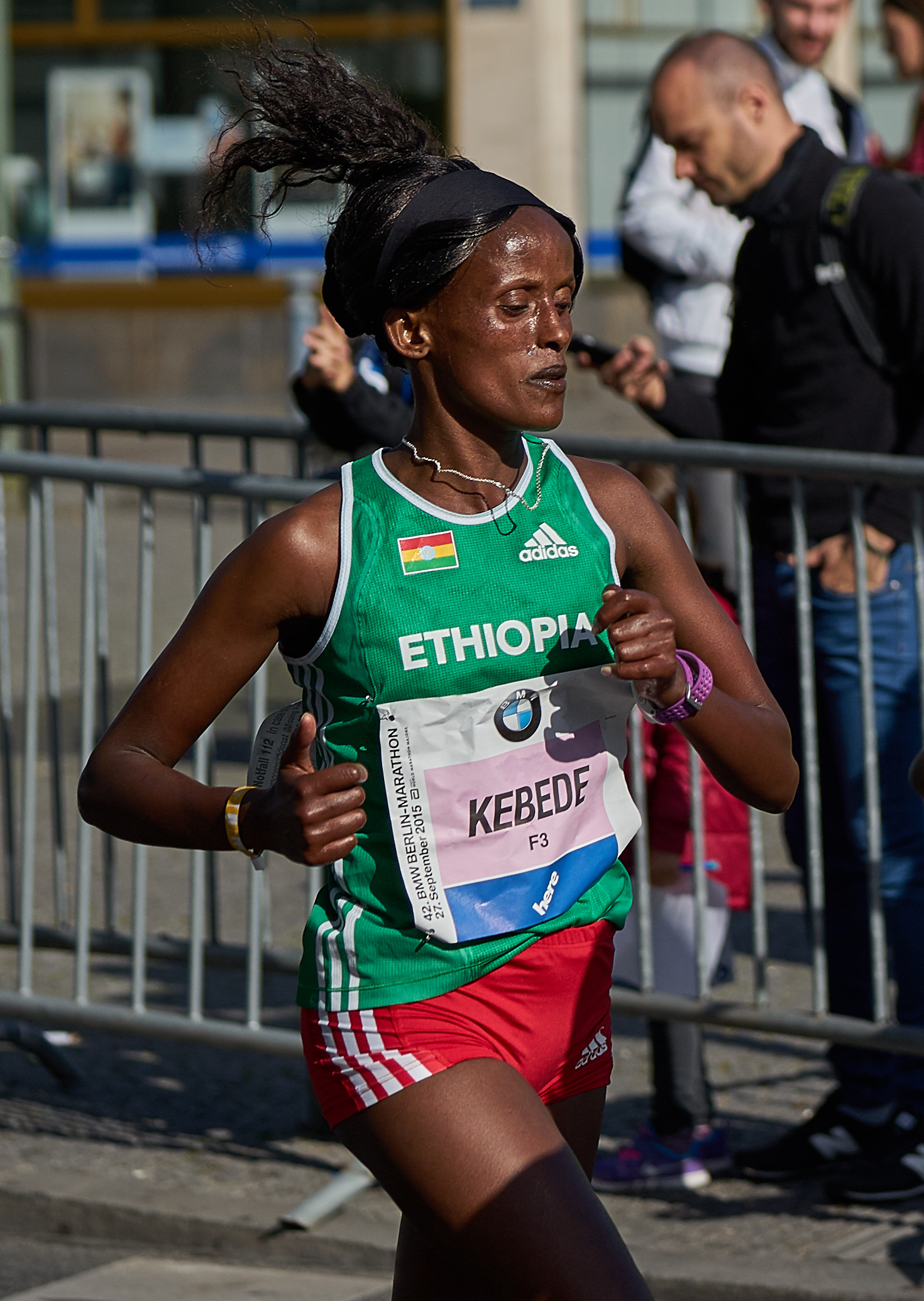
Aberu Kebede, second place

Position	Athlete	Nationality	Time
1st place, gold medalist(s)	Gladys Cherono	Kenya	2:19:25 PB
2nd place, silver medalist(s)	Aberu Kebede	Ethiopia	2:20:48
3rd place, bronze medalist(s)	Meseret Hailu	Ethiopia	2:24:33
4	Tadelech Bekele	Ethiopia	2:25:01
5	Andrea Deelstra	Netherlands	2:26:46 PB
6	Maja Neuenschwander	Switzerland	2:26:49 NR
7	Lisa Nemec	Croatia	2:27:57
8	Tomomi Tanaka	Japan	2:28:00
9	Sonia Samuels	United Kingdom	2:28:04 PB
10	Fate Tola	Ethiopia	2:28:24
