= Betelhem Moges =

Ethiopian long-distance runner

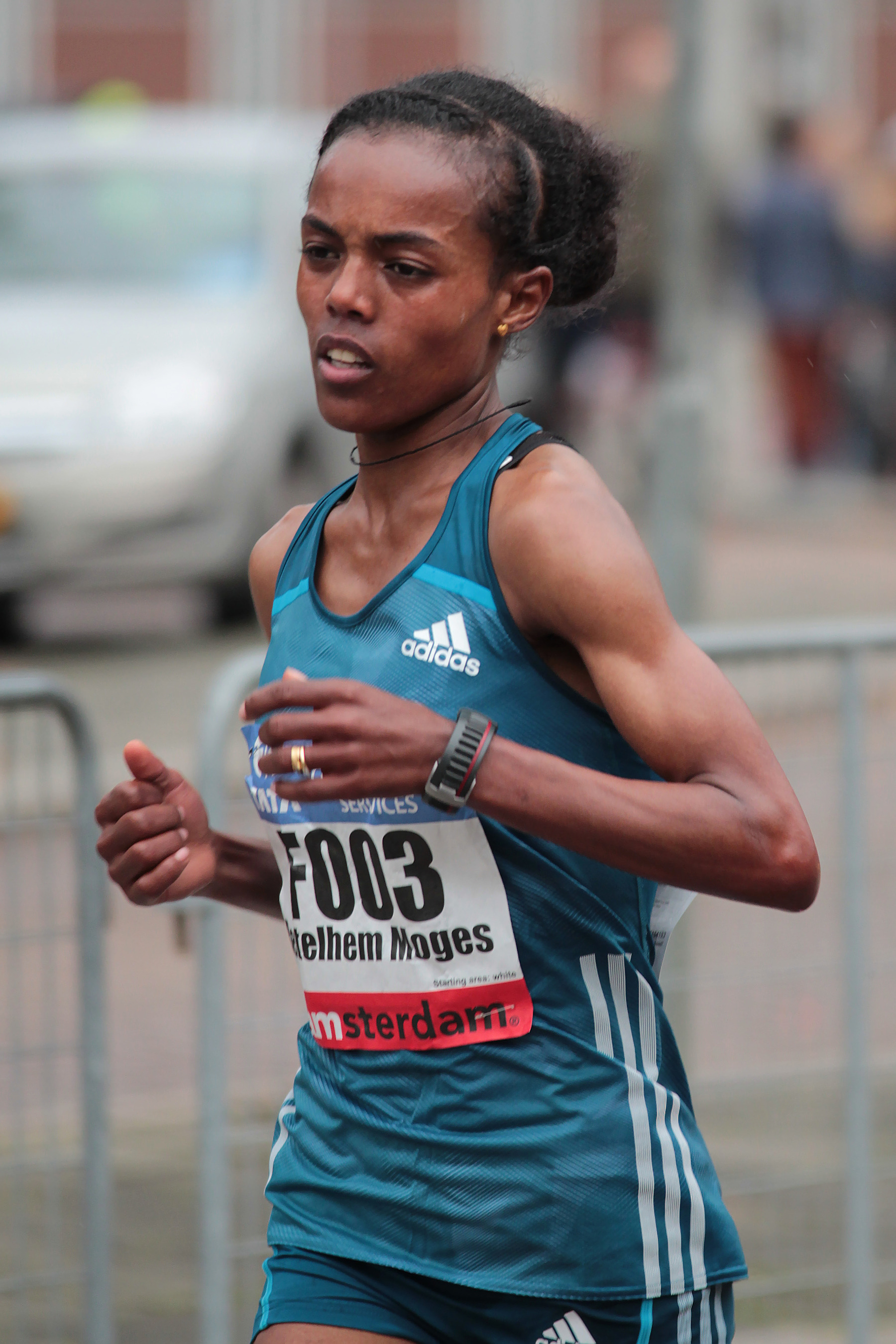
- Betelhem Moges (2014)

Personal information
- Born: 3 May 1991 (age 34)

Sport
- Country: Ethiopia
- Sport: Athletics
- Event: Long-distance running

Betelhem Moges (born 3 May 1991) is an Ethiopian long-distance runner competing in marathon and half marathon events.

== Career ==
In 2012, she won the Ústí nad Labem Half Marathon held in Ústí nad Labem, Czech Republic with a time of 1:11:51.

In 2013, she won the Olomouc Half Marathon held in Olomouc, Czech Republic with a time of 1:10:38.

In 2014, she won the České Budějovice Half Marathon held in České Budějovice, Czech Republic with a time of 1:12:31. In this year, she also won a marathon event for the first time: the Amsterdam Marathon held in Amsterdam, Netherlands with a time of 2:28:35.

In 2015, she won the Beijing Marathon held in Beijing, China with a time of 2:27:31.

In 2017, she won the Cape Town Marathon held in Cape Town, South Africa with a time of 2:30:22.

In 2019, she finished in 2nd place in the marathon event of the Ottawa Race Weekend held in Ottawa, Ontario, Canada.

== Achievements ==
Year	Competition	Venue	Position	Event	Notes
Representing Ethiopia
2012	Ústí nad Labem Half Marathon	Ústí nad Labem, Czech Republic	1st	Half marathon	1:11:51
2013	Olomouc Half Marathon	Olomouc, Czech Republic	1st	Half marathon	1:10:38
2014	České Budějovice Half Marathon	České Budějovice, Czech Republic	1st	Half marathon	1:12:31
2014	Amsterdam Marathon	Amsterdam, Netherlands	1st	Marathon	2:28:35
2015	Beijing Marathon	Beijing, China	1st	Marathon	2:27:31
2017	Cape Town Marathon	Cape Town, South Africa	1st	Marathon	2:30:22
2019	Ottawa Race Weekend	Ottawa, Canada	2nd	Marathon	2:27:00
