= Tadelech Bekele =

Ethiopian long-distance runner

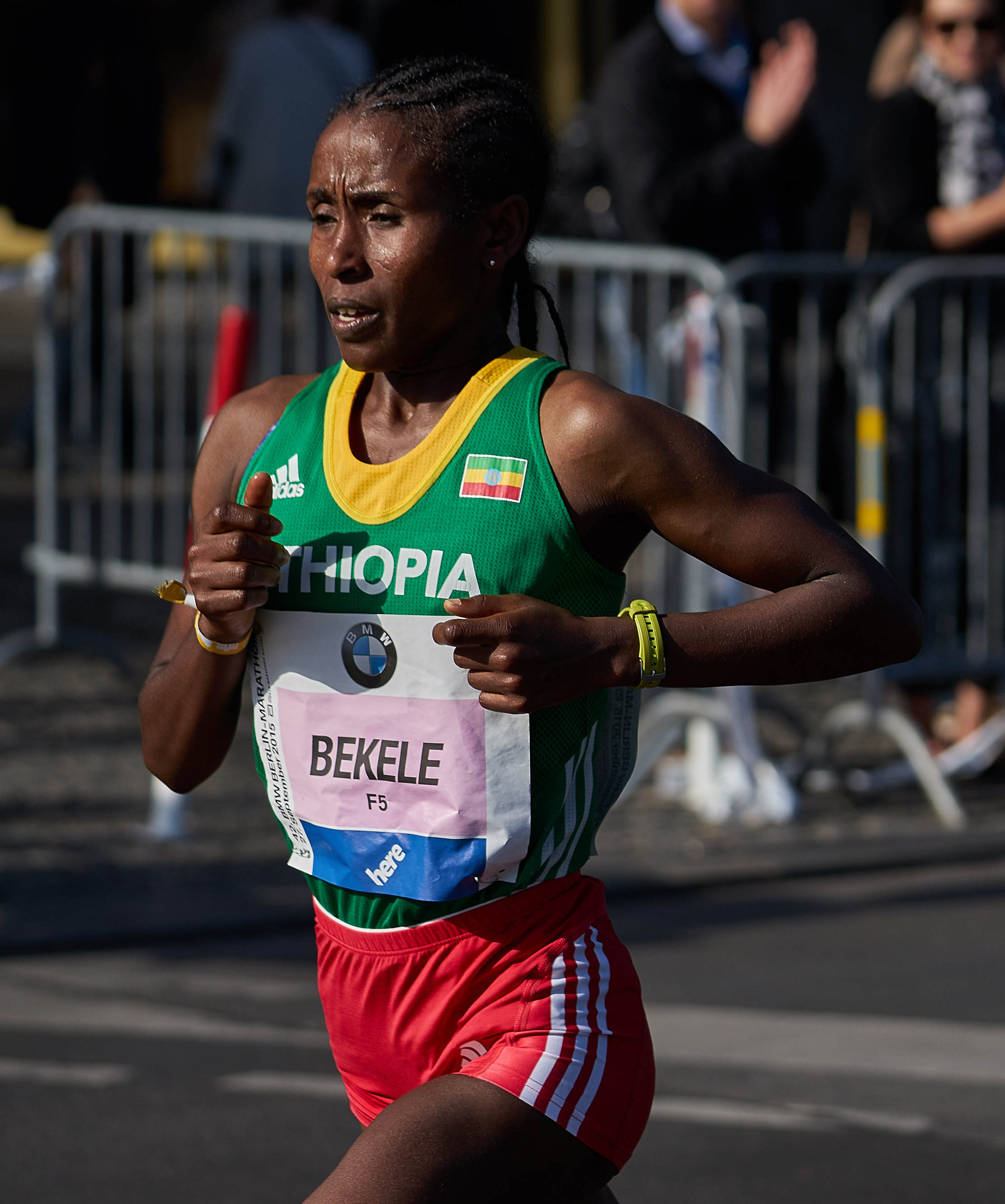

Personal information
- Born: 11 April 1991 (age 34)

Sport
- Country: Ethiopia
- Sport: Athletics
- Event: Long-distance running

Tadelech Bekele (born 11 April 1991) is an Ethiopian long-distance runner.

== Career ==
In 2012, she won the České Budějovice Half Marathon with a time of 1:10:54. In this year she also won the Prague Grand Prix with a time of 15:48, the last year that the Prague Grand Prix was a five kilometres run for women.

In 2014, she won the Berlin Half Marathon with a time of 1:10:05. In 2017 and 2018 she won the Amsterdam Marathon.

In the Berlin Marathon she finished in 4th place in both the 2014 Berlin Marathon and the 2015 Berlin Marathon.

In the 2018 London Marathon she finished in 3rd place with a time of 2:21:40.

== Achievements ==
Year	Competition	Venue	Position	Event	Notes
Representing Ethiopia
2012	České Budějovice Half Marathon	České Budějovice, Czech Republic	1st	Half marathon	1:10:54
2012	Prague Grand Prix	Prague, Czech Republic	1st	5,000 m	15:48
2014	Berlin Half Marathon	Berlin, Germany	1st	Half marathon	1:10:05
2014	Berlin Marathon	Berlin, Germany	4th	Marathon	2:23:02
2015	Berlin Marathon	Berlin, Germany	4th	Marathon	2:25:01
2017	Amsterdam Marathon	Amsterdam, Netherlands	1st	Marathon	2:21:54
2018	Amsterdam Marathon	Amsterdam, Netherlands	1st	Marathon	2:23:14
2018	London Marathon	London, United Kingdom	3rd	Marathon	2:21:40
