= Agnes Jeruto Barsosio =

Kenyan long-distance runner

Personal information
- Born: August 5, 1982 (age 44)

Sport
- Country: Kenya
- Sport: Long-distance running

Agnes Jeruto Barsosio is a Kenyan athlete and marathon runner. She was born in 1983. She competes for the Kenya national team and represents Kenya in international athletics competitions.

Barsosio was issued with a five-year ban from competition by the Athletics Integrity Unit in September 2023 due to a doping violation.

== Career ==
In 2008, she was the second best athlete in the Lille Half Marathon and won the Foulees Monterelaises. She finished second in the 10 km race at Taroudant. In the same year, she debuted on the Düsseldorf Marathon and won the race. In April 2012, Agnes competed in the 10th Metro Group Marathon Düsseldorf. This was her debut in the marathon and she both won and set a new course record in a time of 2:25:49, surpassing the previous record by just under a minute.

On 6 May 2017, Barsosio competed in the sixth edition of České Budějovice Half Marathon held in České Budějovice, Czech Republic. She emerged winner and set a new course record with a time of 1:09:53 after defeating fellow Kenyan female athletes, Rebecca Cheris and Lucy Wangui Kabuu. On June 3, 2017, she competed in the Budweis half marathon, where she reached a new personal best of 01:09:56. On June 25, 2017, she set a new race record in the sixth Ceske Budejovice Half Marathon, an IAAF Gold Label Road Race, in a record time of 1:09:53. This achievement broke the previous record of 1:10:40 set last year by Ashete Bekere of Ethiopia.

In September 2023, Barsosio was issued with a five-year ban for an anti-doping rule violation in relation to abnormalities in an her Athlete Biological Passport. The initial six-year ban was reduced by one year as she admitted breaking the rules.
