= Ústí nad Labem Half Marathon =

Coordinates: 50.6600°N 14.0406°E

- Date: September
- Location: Ústí nad Labem, Czech Republic
- Event type: Road
- Distance: Half marathon
- Primary sponsor: Mattoni
- Established: 2011
- Course records: Men's: 59:14 (2017) (Kenya) Barselius Kipyego; Women's: 1:06:06 (2017) (Bahrain) Violah Jepchumba
- Website: Ústí nad Labem Half Marathon
- Participants: 2,350 (2019)

The Ústí nad Labem Half Marathon is an annual half marathon race which takes place in September in Ústí nad Labem, Czech Republic. Known as the Mattoni Ústí Half Marathon, it is a part of RunCzech running circuit.

The course winds through Ústí nad Labem city centre on both banks of Labe river and also through SPOLCHEMIE chemical plant. The inaugural edition of the event was held in 2011. In 2013, almost 3 000 runners participated in the race.

The course records are held by Kenya's Barselius Kipyego and Peres Jepchirchir.

== Past winners ==
Key: Course record

Year	Men's winner	Time (h:m:s)	Women's winner	Time (h:m:s)
2011	Philemon Limo (KEN)	1:00:57	Agnes Kiprop (KEN)	1:09:12
2012	Henry Kiplagat (KEN)	1:01:26	Betelhem Moges (ETH)	1:11:51
2013	Philemon Limo (KEN)	1:00:38	Josephine Chepkoech (KEN)	1:09:08
2014	Adugna Takele (ETH)	1:00:45	Correti Jepkoech (KEN)	1:09:35
2015	Merhawi Kesete (ERI)	1:00:58	Peres Jepchirchir (KEN)	1:07:17
2016	Barselius Kipyego (KEN)	59:15	Peres Jepchirchir (KEN)	1:07:24
2017	Barselius Kipyego (KEN)	59:14	Violah Jepchumba (BHR)	1:06:06
2018	Stephen Kiprop (KEN)	59:41	Diana Kipyokei (KEN)	1:07:17
2019	Hendrik Pfeiffer (GER)	1:03:17	Jess Piasecki (GBR)	1:11:34
2023	Sebastian Hendel (GER)	1:05:16	Valeriia Zinenko (UKR)	1:13:43
2024	Gáspár Csere (HUN)	1:06:06	Tereza Hrochová (CZE)	1:12:01
