= Hisayuki Okawa =

Japanese long-distance runner (born 1971)

Hisayuki Okawa (大川 久之, Ōkawa Hisayuki; born August 27, 1971) is a retired male long-distance runner from Japan, who won the 1995 edition of Amsterdam Marathon, clocking 2:14:00 on September 24, 1995.

== Achievements ==
Year	Competition	Venue	Position	Event	Notes
Representing Japan
1995	Amsterdam Marathon	Amsterdam, Netherlands	1st	Marathon	2:14:00
