= Prague Grand Prix =

- Date: September
- Location: Prague, Czech Republic
- Event type: Road
- Distance: 10 kilometres
- Primary sponsor: Birell
- Established: 18 May 1996
- Course records: Men's: 26:46 (2018) (Kenya) Rhonex Kipruto; Women's: 29:43 (2017) (Kenya) Joyciline Jepkosgei
- Website: Prague Grand Prix
- Participants: 6,193 (2019)

The Prague Grand Prix is an annual running event which takes place in September in Prague, Czech Republic. It is a 10-kilometre race organised in the attractive surroundings of Prague city centre during evening twilight. The race was introduced in 1996 as the O_{2} Prague Grand Prix, and is a part of the RunCzech running circuit. The event holds IAAF Gold Label Road Race status.

The new course was introduced in 2013 and course records are held by Kenya's Rhonex Kipruto and Joyciline Jepkosgei.

== Past winners ==
Key: Course record

Edition	Year	Men's winner	Time (h:m:s)	Women's winner	Time (h:m:s) (Note: Until 2012, women ran 5 kilometres.)
11th	2007	Wilfred Taragon (KEN)	28:26	Irene Kwambai (KEN)	15:46
12th	2008	Vitaliy Rybak (UKR)	29:27	Anikó Kálovics (HUN)	15:27
13th	2009	Dickson Marwa (TAN)	28:24	Gladys Otero (KEN)	15:45
14th	2010	Mourad Marofit (MAR)	28:27	Zakia Mrisho (TAN)	15:41
15th	2011	Philemon Limo (KEN)	27:34	Priscah Cherono (KEN)	15:32
16th	2012	Henry Kiplagat (KEN)	27:51	Tadelech Bekele (ETH)	15:48
17th	2013	Daniel Chebii (KEN)	27:35	Josephine Chepkoech (KEN)	32:00
18th	2014	Geoffrey Ronoh (KEN)	27:28	Correti Jepkoech (KEN)	31:05
19th	2015	Daniel Chebii (KEN)	27:42	Peres Jepchirchir (KEN)	30:55
20th	2016	Abraham Kipyatich (KEN)	27:40	Violah Jepchumba (KEN)	30:24
21st	2017	Benard Kimeli (KEN)	27:10	Joyciline Jepkosgei (KEN)	29:43 WR
22nd	2018	Rhonex Kipruto (KEN)	26:46	Caroline Kipkirui (KEN)	30:19
23rd	2019	Geoffrey Koech (KEN)	27:02	Sheila Chepkirui (KEN)	29:57
24th	2022	Hicham Amghar (MAR)	27:24	Irene Cheptai (KEN)	30:16
25th	2023	Tadese Worku (ETH)	27:35	Janeth Chepngetich (KEN)	30:21
26th	2024	Dennis Kitiyo (KEN)	27:17	Diana Chepkorir (KEN)	30:12
27th	2025	Damián Vích (CZE)	28:46	Alessia Zarbo (FRA)	30:59 NR
28th	2026	Rodrigue Kwizera (ESP)	27:15 NR	Chaltu Dida (ETH)	30:03
