= České Budějovice Half Marathon =

Czech annual half marathon race

- Date: June
- Location: České Budějovice, Czech Republic
- Event type: Road
- Distance: Half marathon
- Primary sponsor: Mattoni 1873
- Established: 2012
- Course records: Men: Daniel Chebii (KEN) 59:49; Women: Agnes Barsosio (ETH) 1:09:53
- Website: Official website

The České Budějovice Half Marathon is an annual half marathon race which takes place in early June in České Budějovice, Czech Republic. Known as the Mattoni České Budějovice Half Marathon, it is a part of RunCzech running circuit.

The course winds through České Budějovice city centre and along the Vltava river. The inaugural edition of the event was held in 2012. In 2013, almost 2 000 runners participated in the race.

The course records are held by Daniel Chebii and Agnes Barsosio. In 2012, České Budějovice was only the second race in the Czech Republic in which a half marathon was completed below the one-hour mark.

== Past winners ==
Key: Course record

Year	Men's winner	Time (h:m:s)	Women's winner	Time (h:m:s)
2012	Daniel Chebii (KEN)	59:49	Tadelech Bekele (ETH)	1:10:54
2013	Tamirat Tola (ETH)	1:02:04	Hurtesa Khedija (ETH)	1:12:11
2014	Geoffrey Kamworor (KEN)	1:00:09	Betelhem Moges (ETH)	1:12:31
2015	Abraham Cheroben (KEN)	1:01:24	Rose Chelimo (KEN)	1:12:01
2016	Barselius Kipyego (KEN)	1:00:30	Ashete Bekere (ETH)	1:10:40
2017	Justus Kangogo (KEN)	1:02:47	Agnes Barsosio (ETH)	1:09:53
2018	Luke Traynor (GBR)	1:03:42	Lilia Fisikovici (MDA)	1:13:20
2019	Yassine Rachik (ITA)	1:03:02	Lilia Fisikovici (MDA)	1:13:29
2020	Did not hed			
2021	Did not hed			
2022	Did not hed			
2023	Tomasz Grycko (POL)	1:04:01	Militsa Mircheva (BUL)	1:14:56
2024	Sebastian Hendel (GER)	1:03:38	Maryna Nemchenko (UKR)	1:11:26
