= Olomouc Half Marathon =

Half marathon race in the Czech Republic

Coordinates: 49.5933°N 17.2508°E

- Date: June
- Location: Olomouc, Czech Republic
- Event type: Road
- Distance: Half marathon
- Primary sponsor: Mattoni
- Established: 19 June 2010
- Course records: Men's: 1:00:15 (2018) (Kenya) Stephen Kiprop; Women's: 1:06:38 (2015) (Kenya) Mary Keitany
- Website: Olomouc Half Marathon
- Participants: 4,465 (2019)

The Olomouc Half Marathon is an annual half marathon race which takes place in June in Olomouc, Czech Republic. Known as the Mattoni Olomouc Half Marathon, it is a part of RunCzech running circuit. In 2013, it was awarded IAAF Silver Label Road Race status.

The course circumvents in two large loops city centre of Olomouc. The first edition of the event was held on June 19, 2010. In 2013, about 3 500 runners participated in the race.

== Past winners ==
Key: Course record

Year	Men's winner	Time (h:m:s)	Women's winner	Time (h:m:s)
2010	Joseph Maregu (KEN)	1:03:19	Asnakech Mengitsu (ETH)	1:13:12
2011	Shami Abdulahi (ETH)	1:00:44	Netsanet Achamo (ETH)	1:10:41
2012	Nicholas Kipkemboi (KEN)	1:01:48	Yebergual Melese (ETH)	1:11:33
2013	Henry Kiplagat (KEN)	1:03:00	Betelhem Moges (ETH)	1:10:38
2014	Geoffrey Ronoh (KEN)	1:00:17	Edna Kiplagat (KEN)	1:08:53
2015	Josphat Kiptis (KEN)	1:00:21	Mary Keitany (KEN)	1:06:38
2016	Stanley Biwott (KEN)	1:00:46	Mary Keitany (KEN)	1:08:53
2017	Josphat Kiptis (KEN)	1:01:50	Worknesh Degefa (ETH)	1:09:19
2018	Stephen Kiprop (KEN)	1:00:15	Netsanet Gudeta (ETH)	1:07:30
2019	Yassine Rachik (ITA)	1:04:26	Lilia Fisikovici (MDA)	1:13:32
2023	Sebastian Hendel (GER)	1:03:55	Hanne Verbruggen (BEL)	1:12:44
2024	Daniele D'Onofrio (ITA)	1:04:56	Nóra Szabó (HUN)	1:12:44
