= 2014 in the sport of athletics =

2014 in athletics
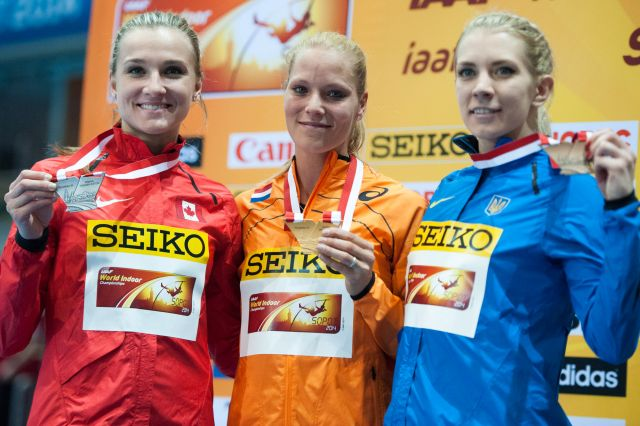
- Pentathlon medallists from the World Indoor Championships
- Major world events: World Indoor Championships; Continental Cup; Commonwealth Games
- New competitions: IAAF World Relays

In 2014 there was no primary outdoor global athletics championship, as neither the Summer Olympics nor the World Championships in Athletics occurred in the year. The 2014 IAAF World Indoor Championships, and the 2014 IAAF Continental Cup were the foremost global events to be held in 2014. The 2014 IAAF World Relays marked the debut of the new international competition exclusively for relay races.

The Diamond League entered its fifth year as the foremost seasonal track and field series. The 2014 IAAF World Half Marathon Championships and the 2014 IAAF World Race Walking Cup were the highest level competitions for those disciplines. Major regional events which took place in 2014 include the European Championships, African Championships, and Commonwealth Games.

== Major events ==
=== World ===
- World Indoor Championships in Athletics
- World Junior Championships in Athletics
- Continental Cup
- Commonwealth Games
- Summer Youth Olympics
- IAAF Diamond League
- World Marathon Majors
- World Half Marathon Championships
- IAAF World Race Walking Cup
- WMRA World Mountain Running Championships

=== Regional ===
- African Championships
- Asian Indoor Championships
- Asian Junior Championships
- Asian Race Walking Championships
- Asian Games
- Central American and Caribbean Games
- Central American Championships
- European Athletics Championships
- European Cross Country Championships
- European Cup Winter Throwing
- European Cup 10,000m
- European Mountain Running Championships
- European Team Championships
- Ibero-American Championships
- Lusophony Games
- Micronesian Games
- NACAC Cross Country Championships
- South American Games
- South American U23 Championships
- South American Cross Country Championships
- South Asian Junior Championships
- Oceania Athletics Championships
- Oceania Cross Country Championships

=== National ===
- 2014 British Athletics Championships
- 2014 German Athletics Championships
- 2014 Italian Athletics Championships
- 2014 Japan Championships in Athletics
- 2014 Russian Championships in Athletics
- 2014 USA Outdoor Track and Field Championships

=== Marathons ===
- Tokyo Marathon
- Boston Marathon
- London Marathon
- Berlin Marathon
- Chicago Marathon
- New York City Marathon

== World records ==
=== Indoor ===
Event	Athlete	Nation	Result	Location	Date
Men's Pole Vault	Renaud Lavillenie	France	6.16	Donetsk, Ukraine	15 February
Men's 4 × 400 m relay	Kyle Clemons; David Verburg; Kind Butler; Calvin Smith	United States	3:02.13	Sopot, Poland	9 March
Men's 4 × 800 m relay	Richard Jones; David Torrence; Duane Solomon; Erik Sowinski	United States	7:13.11	Boston, USA	8 February
Women's 1500 metres	Genzebe Dibaba	Ethiopia	3:55.17	Karlsruhe, Germany	1 February
Women's 3000 metres	Genzebe Dibaba	Ethiopia	8:16.60	Stockholm, Sweden	6 February

=== Outdoor ===
Event	Athlete	Nation	Result	Location	Date
Men's 4 × 200 metres relay	Nickel Ashmeade; Warren Weir; Jermaine Brown; Yohan Blake	Jamaica	1:18.63	Nassau, Bahamas	25 May
Men's 4 × 1500 metres relay	Collins Cheboi; Silas Kiplagat; James Kiplagat Magut; Asbel Kiprop	Kenya	14:22.22	Nassau, Bahamas	25 May
Men's Marathon	Dennis Kipruto Kimetto	Kenya	2:02.57	Berlin, Germany	28 September
Women's 4 × 1500 metres relay	Mercy Cherono; Faith Chepngetich Kipyegon; Irene Jelagat; Hellen Onsando Obiri	Kenya	16:33.58	Nassau, Bahamas	24 May
Women's hammer throw	Anita Włodarczyk	Poland	79.58 m	Berlin, Germany	31 August
Women's Half Marathon	Florence Jebet Kiplagat	Kenya	1:05:12	Barcelona, Spain	16 February

== Results ==
- November 10, 2013 – February 15, 2014: 2014 IAAF Cross Country Permit
  - November 10, 2013, at (Spain) Soria
    - Men's winner: (Uganda) Dickson Huru
    - Women's winner: (Ethiopia) Marta Tigabea Mekonen
  - November 17, 2013, at (Spain) Burgos
    - Men's winner: (Ethiopia) Imane Merga
    - Women's winner: (Ethiopia) Hiwot Ayalew
  - December 22, 2013, at (Belgium) Brussels
    - Men's winner: (Kenya) Alex Kibet
    - Women's winner: (Netherlands) Sifan Hassan
  - January 4, 2014, at (United Kingdom) Antrim
    - Men's winner: (Kenya) Japhet Korir
    - Women's winner: (Bahrain) Mimi Belete
  - January 6, 2014, at (Italy) San Giorgio su Legnano
    - Men's winner: (Bahrain) Albert Rop
    - Women's winner: (Ethiopia) Hiwot Ayalew
  - January 11, 2014, at (United Kingdom) Edinburgh
    - Men's 4 km winner: (United States) Garrett Heath
    - Men's 8 km winner: (United States) Chris Derrick
    - Women's (6 km) winner: (United Kingdom) Gemma Steel
  - January 19, 2014, at (Spain) Seville
    - Men's winner: (Kenya) Paul Tanui
    - Women's winner: (Ethiopia) Hiwot Ayalew
  - January 26, 2014, at (Italy) San Vittore Olona
    - Men's winner: (Kenya) Paul Tanui
    - Women's winner: (Kenya) Faith Kipyegon
  - February 2, 2014, at (Portugal) Albufeira
    - Men's winner: (Morocco) Mohamed Moustaoui
    - Women's winner: (Ethiopia) Hiwot Ayalew
  - February 9, 2014, at (Japan) Chiba
    - Event cancelled, due to snow storms
  - February 9, 2014, at (Luxembourg) Diekirch
    - Men's winner: (Eritrea) Zersenay Tadese
    - Women's winner: (Ethiopia) Eleni Gebrehiwot
  - February 15, 2014, at (Kenya) Nairobi
    - Men's winner: (Kenya) Bedan Karoki
    - Women's winner: (Kenya) Faith Kipyegon
- January 2 – December 31: 2014 IAAF Road Race Label Events
- NB: An event in **bold text** depicts it as part of the World Marathon Majors series
  - Gold Level
    - January 2: (China) Xiamen International Marathon
      - Winners: (Kenya) Mariko Kiplagat (m) / (Ethiopia) Mare Dibaba (f)
    - January 24: (United Arab Emirates) Dubai Marathon
      - Winners: (Ethiopia) Tsegaye Mekonnen (m) / (Ethiopia) Mula Seboka (f)
    - February 23: (Puerto Rico) World's Best 10K in San Juan
      - Winners: (Kenya) Bedan Karoki (m) / (Kenya) Mary Wacera (f)
    - February 23: (Japan) **Tokyo Marathon** (WMM #1)
      - Winners: (Kenya) Dickson Chumba (m) / (Ethiopia) Tirfi Tsegaye (f)
    - March 2: (Japan) Lake Biwa Marathon
      - Winner: (Ethiopia) Bazu Worku
    - March 2: (Italy) Roma-Ostia Half Marathon
      - Winners: (Morocco) Aziz Lahbabi (m) / (Kenya) Caroline Chepkwony
    - March 9: (Japan) Nagoya Women's Marathon
      - Winner: (Russia) Mariya Konovalova
    - March 16: (Portugal) EDP Half Marathon of Lisbon
      - Winners: (Kenya) Bedan Karoki (m) / (Ethiopia) Werknesh Degefa (f)
    - March 16: (South Korea) Seoul International Marathon
      - Winners: (Ethiopia) Yacob Jarso (m) / (Kenya) Helah Kiprop (f)
    - March 23: (Italy) Maratona di Roma
      - Winners: (Ethiopia) Shume Hailu (m) / (Ethiopia) Geda Ayelu Lemma (f)
    - April 5: (Czech Republic) Sportisimo Prague Half Marathon
      - Winners: (Kenya) Peter Cheruiyot Kirui (m) / (Kenya) Joyce Chepkirui (f)
    - April 6: (France) Schneider Electric Marathon de Paris
      - Winners: (Ethiopia) Kenenisa Bekele (m) / (Kenya) Flomena Cheyech (f)
    - April 13: (Netherlands) ABN AMRO Marathon Rotterdam
      - Winners: (Kenya) Eliud Kipchoge (m) / (Ethiopia) Abebech Afework (f)
    - April 13: (United Kingdom) **London Marathon** (WMM #2)
      - Winners: (Kenya) Wilson Kipsang Kiprotich (m) / (Kenya) Edna Kiplagat (f)
    - April 13: (Austria) Vienna City Marathon
      - Winners: (Ethiopia) Getu Feleke (m) / (Germany) Anna Hahner (f)
    - April 20: (China) Yangzhou Jianzhen International Half Marathon
      - Winners: (Eritrea) Nguse Amlosom (m) / (Kenya) Gladys Cherono (f)
    - April 21: (United States) **Boston Marathon** (WMM #3)
      - Winners: (United States) Meb Keflezighi (m) / (Kenya) Rita Jeptoo (f)
    - May 11: (Czech Republic) Volkswagen Prague Marathon
      - Winners: (Kenya) Patrick Kipyegon Terer (m) / (Ethiopia) Firehiwot Dado (f)
    - May 18: (United Kingdom) Bupa Great Manchester Run
      - Winners: (Ethiopia) Kenenisa Bekele (m) / (Ethiopia) Tirunesh Dibaba (f)
    - July 6: (Australia) Gold Coast Airport Marathon
      - Winners: (Kenya) Silah Limo (m) / (Japan) Asami Kato (f)
    - July 27: (Colombia) Bogotá International Half Marathon
      - Winners: (Kenya) Geoffrey Kamworor Kipsang (m) / (Kenya) Rita Jeptoo (f)
    - September 6: (Czech Republic) Birell Prague Grand Prix 10 km
      - Winners: (Kenya) Geoffrey Ronoh (m) / (Kenya) Correti Jepkoech (f)
    - September 7: (United Kingdom) BUPA Great North Run
      - Winners: (United Kingdom) Mo Farah (m) / (Kenya) Mary Jepkosgei Keitany (f)
    - September 28: (Germany) **Berlin Marathon** (WMM #4)
      - Winners: (Kenya) Dennis Kipruto Kimetto (**World Record**) (m) / (Ethiopia) Tirfi Tsegaye (f)
    - September 28: (Colombia) Carrera de la Mujer
      - Winner: (Ethiopia) Belaynesh Oljira
    - October 5: Rock 'n' Roll Vodafone Half Marathon of Portugal
      - Winners: (Kenya) Stephen Kosgei Kibet (m) / (Kenya) Purity Rionoripo (f)
    - October 5: (Portugal) Rock 'n' Roll Maratona de Lisboa EDP
      - Winners: (Kenya) Samuel Ndungu (m) / (Kenya) Visiline Jepkesho (f)
    - October 5: (United Kingdom) Bank of Scotland Great Scottish Run
      - Winners: (South Africa) Stephen Mokoka (m) / (Kenya) Edna Kiplagat (f)
    - October 12: (United States) **Bank of America Chicago Marathon** (WMM #5)
      - Winners: (Kenya) Eliud Kipchoge (m) / (Kenya) Rita Jeptoo (f)
    - October 19: (Netherlands) TCS Amsterdam Marathon
      - Winners: (Kenya) Bernard Kipyego (m) / (Ethiopia) Betelhem Moges (f)
    - October 19: (China) Beijing Marathon
      - Winners: (Ethiopia) Girmay Birhanu (m) / (Ethiopia) Fatuma Sado (f)
    - October 26: (United Kingdom) Great South Run
      - Winners: (Kenya) James Rungaru (m) / (Ethiopia) Belaynesh Oljira (f)
    - October 26: (Germany) Frankfurt Marathon
      - Winners: (Kenya) Mark Kiptoo (m) / (Ethiopia) Aberu Kebede (f)
    - November 2: (United States) **TCS New York City Marathon** (final WMM)
      - Winners: (Kenya) Wilson Kipsang Kiprotich (m) / (Kenya) Mary Jepkosgei Keitany (f)
    - November 2: (China) Shanghai Marathon
      - Winners: (South Africa) Stephen Mokoka (m) / (Ethiopia) Tigist Tufa (f)
    - November 16: (Turkey) Istanbul Marathon
      - Winners: (Morocco) Hafid Chani (m) / (Ethiopia) Amane Gobena (f)
    - December 7: (Japan) Fukuoka Marathon (men only) (co-final)
      - Winner: (Kenya) Patrick Makau Musyoki
    - December 7: Singapore Marathon (co-final)
      - Winners: (Kenya) Kenneth Mburu Mungara (m) / (Ethiopia) Waganesh Amare (f)
  - Silver Level
    - January 26: (Japan) Osaka International Ladies Marathon
      - Winner: (Ukraine) Tetyana Hamera-Shmyrko
    - February 2: (Japan) Beppu-Ōita Marathon
      - Winner: (Uganda) Abraham Kiplimo
    - February 2: (Japan) Kagawa Marugame Half Marathon
      - Winners: (Kenya) Martin Mathathi (m) / (Japan) Eri Makikawa (f)
    - February 16: Hong Kong Marathon
      - Winners: (Ethiopia) Feyera Gemeda (m) / (Ethiopia) Rehima Kedir (f)
    - April 6: (Republic of Ireland) Great Ireland Run
      - Winners: (Kenya) Japhet Korir (m) / (Poland) Iwona Lewandowska (f)
    - April 6: (South Korea) Daegu Marathon
      - Winners: (Ethiopia) Yemane Tsegay (m) / (Ethiopia) Mulu Seboka (f)
    - April 27: (Germany) Hannover Marathon
      - Winners: (Kenya) Henry Chirchir (m) / (Algeria) Souad Aït Salem (f)
    - April 27: (Spain) Madrid Marathon
      - Winners: (Kenya) Ezekiel Kiptoo Chebii (m) / (Ethiopia) Alem Frike (f)
    - May 24 & 25: (Canada) Ottawa Race Weekend
      - Winners (10k race): (Kenya) Wilson Kiprop (m) / (Kenya) Mary Jepkosgei Keitany (f)
      - Winners (marathon): (Ethiopia) Yemane Tsegay (m) / (Ethiopia) Tigist Tufa (f)
    - May 31: (United States) Freihofer's Run for Women
      - Winner: (Kenya) Lucy Kabuu
    - June 7: (Czech Republic) Mattoni České Budějovice Half Marathon
      - Winners: (Kenya) Geoffrey Kipsang (m) / (Ethiopia) Betelhem Moges (f)
    - June 21: (Czech Republic) Mattoni Half Marathon Olomouc
      - Winners: (Kenya) Geoffrey Ronoh (m) / (Kenya) Edna Kiplagat (f)
    - September 14: (Czech Republic) Mattoni Ústí nad Labem Half Marathon
      - Winners: (Ethiopia) Adugna Takele (m) / (Kenya) Correti Jepkoech (f)
    - September 21: (Netherlands) Dam tot Damloop
      - Winners: (Kenya) John Nzau Mwangangi (m) / (Kenya) Linet Masai (f)
    - September 21: (Australia) Blackmores Sydney Marathon
      - Winners: (Ethiopia) Gebo Burka (m) / (Ethiopia) Biruktayit Eshetu (f)
    - October 19: (United Kingdom) BUPA Great Birmingham Run
      - Winners: (Kenya) Joel Kimutai (m) / (Kenya) Poline Wanjiku (f)
    - October 19: (Spain) Media Maraton Valencia Trinidad Alfonso (half marathon)
      - Winners: (Kenya) Abraham Cheroben (m) / (Kenya) Emily Chebet (f)
    - October 19: (Canada) Toronto Waterfront Marathon
      - Winners: (Kenya) Laban Korir (m) / (Ethiopia) Mulu Seboka (f)
    - October 26: (Italy) Venice Marathon
      - Winners: (Ethiopia) Behailu Mamo (m) / (Ethiopia) Konjit Tilahun (f)
    - October 26: (France) Marseille Cassis 20km
      - Winners: (Kenya) Titus Mbishei (m) / (Kenya) Peris Chepchirchir (f)
    - November 16: (Japan) Yokohama Women's Marathon
      - Winner: (Japan) Tomomi Tanaka
    - December 28: (France) Corrida de Houilles
      - Winners: (Kenya) Victor Chumo (m) / (Kenya) Peris Jepchichir (f)
    - December 31: (Spain) San Silvestre Vallecana (final)
      - Winners: (Kenya) Mike Kigen (m) / (United Kingdom) Gemma Steel (f)
  - Bronze Level
    - February 23: (Spain) Maraton Ciudad de Sevilla
      - Winners: (Kenya) Cosmas Kiplimo Legat (m) / (Kenya) Pamela Rotich (f)
    - April 6: (Chile) Maraton de Santiago
      - Winners: (Eritrea) Beraki Beyene (m) / (Kenya) Emily Perpetua Chepkorir (f)
    - April 6: (United Kingdom) Brighton Marathon
      - Winners: (Kenya) William Chebor (m) / (Kenya) Alice Milgo (f)
    - April 6: (Italy) Milano City Marathon
      - Winners: (Kenya) Francis Kiprop (m) / (Kenya) Visiline Jepkesho (f)
    - April 13: (North Korea) Pyongyang Marathon
      - Winners: (North Korea) Pak Chol (m) / (North Korea) Kim Hye-Gyong (f)
    - April 13: (Poland) Łódź Maraton Dbam o Zdrowie
      - Winners: (Poland) Yared Shegumo (m) / (Poland) Karolina Jarzyńska (f)
    - April 20: (Japan) Nagano Olympic Commemorative Marathon
      - Winners: (Ukraine) Serhiy Lebid (m) / (Russia) Alina Prokopeva (f)
    - May 18: (Latvia) Nordea Riga Marathon
      - Winners: (Japan) Yu Chiba (m) / (Ethiopia) Tigist Teshome Ayanu (f)
    - May 18: (Japan) Gifu Seiryu Half Marathon
      - Winners: (Kenya) Bedan Karoki (m) / (Kenya) Visiline Jepkesho (f)
    - May 25: (United Kingdom) Edinburgh Marathon
      - Winners: (Kenya) David Toniok (m) / (Ukraine) Kateryna Stetsenko (f)
    - June 1: (China) Lanzhou International Marathon
      - Winners: (Kenya) Gilbert Kiptoo Chepkwony (m) / (Kenya) Eunice Kirwa Jepkirui (f)
    - June 14: (France) Corrida de Langueux – Côtes d'Armor
      - Winners: (Kenya) Victor Kimutai Chumo (m) / (Kenya) Angela Tanui (f)
    - June 28: (Bosnia and Herzegovina) Vidovdan Road Race
      - Winners: (Serbia) Darko Živanović (m) / (Hungary) Anikó Kálovics (f)
    - September 21: (Russia) Siberian International Marathon
      - Winners: (Kenya) John Kyalo Kyui (m) / (Kenya) Purity Kimetto (f)
    - November 9: (Lebanon) Banque du Liban Beirut Marathon
      - Winners: (Ethiopia) Fikadu Girma (m) / (Ethiopia) Mulahabt Tsega (f)
    - November 9: (France) Marathon des Alpes-Maritimes Nice-Cannes
      - Winners: (Ethiopia) Shume Hailu (m) / (Kenya) Rose Jepchumba (f)
    - November 16: (Spain) Maraton Valencia Trinidad Alfonso (full marathon)
      - Winners: (Kenya) Jacob Kendagor (m) / (Namibia) Beata Naigambo (f)
    - December 13: (China) Zhuhai International Half Marathon (final)
      - Winners: (China) MA Jinguo (m) / (China) SUN Lamei (f)
- February 1 – 15: 2014 IAAF Indoor Permit
  - February 1: Weltklasse in Karlsruhe in Karlsruhe
    - Host nation, Germany, won both the gold and overall medal tallies.
  - February 2: Russian Winter Meeting in Moscow
    - Host nation, Russia, won both the gold and overall medal tallies.
  - February 6: XL Galan in Stockholm
    - Seven different national teams won one gold medal each. However, host nation, Sweden, won the overall medal tally.
  - February 8: Boston Indoor Games in Roxbury, Boston
    - Host nation, United States, won both the gold and overall medal tallies.
  - February 9: Indoor Flanders Meeting in (Belgium) Ghent
    - Poland won the gold medal tally. Kenya won the overall medal tally.
  - February 15: British Athletics Grand Prix in (United Kingdom) Birmingham
    - Host nation, Great Britain, and Ethiopia share the gold medal tally, with 3 golds each. Also, Great Britain won the overall medal tally.
- February 2 – August 17: 2014 IAAF Race Walking Challenge
  - February 2: Oceania Race Walking Championships in (Australia) Hobart
    - Winners: (Australia) Dane Bird–Smith (m) / (Australia) Kelly Ruddick (f)
  - February 15 & 16: South American Race Walking Championships in (Bolivia) Cochabamba
    - Winners: (Ecuador) Ronaldo Saquipay (m) / (Peru) Kimberley Garcia (f)
  - February 22: Circuito Internacional de Marcha Chihuahua in (Mexico) Chihuahua
    - Men's 20 km race winner: (Colombia) Éider Arévalo
    - Women's 20 km race winner: (Colombia) Sandra Arenas
    - Men's 50 km race winner: (Mexico) José Leyver
  - March 16: Lugano Trophy – 12th Memorial Mario Albisetti in (Switzerland) Lugano
    - Winners: (Ukraine) Ruslan Dmytrenko (m) / (China) Liu Hong (f)
  - March 16: Asian Race Walking Championships in (Japan) Nomi, Ishikawa
    - Winners: (South Korea) Kim Hyun-sub (m) / (China) Zhou Tongmei (f)
  - March 22: Dudinska Paldesjatka (D-50-km) in (Slovakia) Dudince
    - Men's 20 km race winner: (Slovakia) Matej Tóth
    - Women's 20 km race winner: (Spain) Ainhoa Pinedo
    - Men's 50 km race winner: (Poland) Rafał Augustyn
  - April 5: Grande Prémio Internacional de Rio Maior em Marcha Atlética in (Portugal) Rio Maior
    - Winners: (Brazil) Caio Bonfim (m) / (Portugal) Vera Santos (f)
  - April 12: Poděbrady 2014 in the Czech Republic
    - Winners: (Slovakia) Matej Tóth (m) / (Czech Republic) Anežka Drahotová (f)
  - May 31: XXVIII Gran Premio Cantones de La Coruña in (Spain) A Coruña
    - Winners: (Guatemala) Erick Barrondo (m) / (China) Liu Hong (f)
  - August 10–14: Part of the 2014 African Championships in Athletics in (Morocco) Marrakesh
    - Winners: (South Africa) Lebogang Shange (m) / (Kenya) Grace Wanjiru (f)
  - August 12–17: Part of the 2014 European Athletics Championships (final)
    - Men's 20 km race winner: (Spain) Miguel Ángel López
    - Women's 20 km race winner: (Russia) Elmira Alembekova
    - Men's 50 km race winner: (France) Yohann Diniz
  - Overall winners: (Ukraine) Ruslan Dmytrenko (m) / (China) Liu Hong (f)
- March 7–9: 2014 IAAF World Indoor Championships at (Poland) Sopot
  - The United States won both the gold and overall medal tallies.
- March 22 – September 7: 2014 IAAF World Challenge
  - March 22: IAAF World Challenge in Melbourne
    - Host nation, Australia, won both the gold and overall medal tallies.
  - May 3: Jamaica International Invitational in Kingston
    - United States won both the gold and overall medal tallies.
  - May 11: Seiko Golden Grand Prix Tokyo in Japan
    - United States won both the gold and overall medal tallies.
  - May 17: Ponce Grand Prix in Puerto Rico
    - United States won both the gold and overall medal tallies.
  - May 21: IAAF World Challenge in Beijing
    - Host nation, China, won both the gold and overall medal tallies.
  - June 8: Meeting International Mohammed VI d'Athlétisme de Rabat in Morocco
    - Ethiopia won the gold medal tally. Host nation, Morocco, won the overall medal tally.
  - June 8: IWC Meeting – Hengelo in the Netherlands
    - The United States won both the gold and overall medal tallies.
  - June 17: 53rd Golden Spike Ostrava in the Czech Republic
    - Kenya and the United States won 3 gold medals each. Ethiopia and the United States won 6 overall medals each.
  - July 19: 32nd Meeting Madrid 2014 in Spain
    - Jamaica and the United States won 2 gold medals each. However, the United States won the overall medal tally.
  - August 10: Grande Premio Brasil Caixa Governo do Pará in Belém
    - Host nation, Brazil, won both the gold and overall medal tallies.
  - August 31: ISTAF Berlin in Germany
    - Ethiopia and host nation, Germany, won 3 gold medals each. However, the United States won the overall medal tally.
  - September 2: IAAF World Challenge Zagreb in Croatia
    - Host nation, Croatia, Kenya, and the United States won 2 gold medals each. Kenya and the United States won 5 overall medals each.
  - September 7: Rieti Meeting in Italy (final)
    - Poland won the gold medal tally. Host nation, Italy, won the overall medal tally.
- March 29: 2014 IAAF World Half Marathon Championships at (Denmark) Copenhagen
  - Men's individual winner: (Kenya) Geoffrey Kipsang Kamworor
  - Men's team winner: Eritrea
  - Women's individual winner: (Kenya) Gladys Cherono
  - Women's team winner: Kenya
- May 3 & 4: 2014 IAAF World Race Walking Cup at Taicang
  - Host nation, China, and Russia won 4 gold medals each. However, China won the overall medal tally.
- May 9 – September 5: 2014 IAAF Diamond League
  - May 9: Doha Diamond League in Qatar
    - Kenya won both the gold and overall medal tallies.
  - May 18: Shanghai Golden Grand Prix in China
    - The United States won both the gold and overall medal tallies.
  - May 31: Prefontaine Classic in the United States
    - Host nation, the United States, won both the gold and overall medal tallies.
  - June 5: Golden Gala – Pietro Mennea in (Italy) Rome
    - Kenya and the United States won 3 gold medals each. However, the United States won the overall medal tally.
  - June 11: Bislett Games in (Norway) Oslo
    - The United States won both the gold and overall medal tallies.
  - June 14: Adidas Grand Prix in New York City
    - Host nation, the United States won both the gold and overall medal tallies.
  - July 3: Athletissima in (Switzerland) Lausanne
    - Kenya won both the gold and overall medal tallies.
  - July 5: Meeting Areva in (France) Saint-Denis (Paris)
    - United States won both the gold and overall medal tallies.
  - July 11 & 12: British Athletics Grand Prix #1 in (Scotland) Glasgow
    - United States won both the gold and overall medal tallies.
  - July 18: Herculis in Monaco
    - United States won both the gold and overall medal tallies.
  - August 21: DN Galan in (Sweden) Stockholm
    - United States won both the gold and overall medal tallies.
  - August 24: British Athletics Grand Prix #2 in (England) Birmingham
    - Jamaica and Kenya won 4 gold medals each. However, Kenya won the overall medal tally.
  - August 28: Weltklasse Zürich in Switzerland
    - The United States won both the gold and overall medal tallies.
  - September 5: Memorial Van Damme (final) in (Belgium) Brussels
    - The United States won both the gold and overall medal tallies.
  - For the overall winners of the 2014 IAAF Diamond League, click here.
- May 11 – September 7: 2014 IAAF Hammer Throw Challenge
  - May 11: Seiko Golden Grand Prix Tokyo in Japan (with the IAAF World Challenge at the same time)
    - Winner: (Germany) Betty Heidler
  - May 17: Ponce Grand Prix in Puerto Rico (with the IAAF World Challenge at the same time)
    - Winners: (Hungary) Krisztián Pars (m) / (United States) Amanda Bingson (f)
  - May 21: Part of the IAAF World Challenge in Beijing
    - Winner: (China) Wang Zheng
  - June 7: 60th Janusz Kusociński Memorial in (Poland) Szczecin
    - Winner: (Hungary) Krisztián Pars
  - June 8: Meeting International Mohammed VI d'Athlétisme de Rabat (with the IAAF World Challenge at the same time)
    - Winner: (Germany) Kathrin Klaas
  - June 12: Moscow Challenge in Russia
    - Winners: (Tajikistan) Dilshod Nazarov (m) / (China) Wang Zheng (f)
  - June 17: 53rd Golden Spike Ostrava (with the IAAF World Challenge at the same time)
    - Winners: (Hungary) Krisztián Pars (m) / (Germany) Betty Heidler (f)
  - June 25: Paavo Nurmi Games in (Finland) Turku
    - Winner: (Hungary) Krisztián Pars
  - July 1: 19th International Athletic Meeting in Honor of Miner's Day in (Slovenia) Velenje
    - Winner: (Poland) Paweł Fajdek
    - Note: Not sure, if this event was part of this year's Hammer Throw Challenge or not.
  - July 8: István Gyulai Memorial in (Hungary) Székesfehérvár
    - Winners: (Hungary) Krisztián Pars (m) / (Poland) Anita Włodarczyk (f)
  - July 16: Karlstad Grand Prix in Sweden
    - Winner: (Tajikistan) Dilshod Nazarov
  - July 19: 32nd Meeting Madrid 2014 (with the IAAF World Challenge at the same time)
    - Winner: (Tajikistan) Dilshod Nazarov
  - August 31: ISTAF Berlin (with the IAAF World Challenge at the same time)
    - Winner: (Poland) Anita Włodarczyk (New World Record: 79.58m)
  - September 7: Rieti Meeting (final and with the IAAF World Challenge at the same time)
    - Winner: (Poland) Paweł Fajdek
  - Overall winners: (Hungary) Krisztián Pars (m) / (Poland) Anita Włodarczyk (f)
- April 3 – October 3: 2014 IAAF World Combined Events Challenge
  - April 3 & 4: Oceania Combined Events Championships in (Australia) Melbourne
    - Decathlon winner: (Australia) Jake Stein (7,564 points) (in dispute)
    - Heptathlon winner: (Australia) Sophie Stanwell (5,624 points)
  - May 2 & 3: 27th Multistars – Trofeo Zerneri Acciai in (Italy) Florence
    - Decathlon winner: (Netherlands) Eelco Sintnicolaas (8,161 points)
    - Heptathlon winner: (United Kingdom) Morgan Lake (5,896 points)
  - May 31 & June 1: 40th Hypo-Meeting in (Austria) Götzis
    - Decathlon winner: (United States) Trey Hardee (8,518 points)
    - Heptathlon winner: (United Kingdom) Katarina Johnson-Thompson (6,682 points)
  - June 14 & 15: 8th TNT Express Meeting in (Czech Republic) Kladno
    - Decathlon winner: (Ukraine) Oleksiy Kasyanov (8,083 points)
    - Heptathlon winner: (Czech Republic) Eliška Klučinová (6,460 points)
  - June 26–29: US Championships in (United States) Sacramento, California
    - Decathlon winner: (United States) Trey Hardee (8,599 points)
    - Heptathlon winner: (United States) Sharon Day-Monroe (6,470 points)
  - June 28 & 29: 18th Erdgas Mehrkampf-Meeting in (Germany) Ratingen
    - Decathlon winner: (Germany) Rico Freimuth (8,356 points)
    - Heptathlon winner: (Germany) Lilli Schwarzkopf (6,426 points)
  - July 5 & 6: European Cup Combined Events Super League in (Poland) Toruń
    - Decathlon winner: (Netherlands) Eelco Sintnicolaas (8,156 points)
    - Heptathlon winner: (Netherlands) Nadine Broersen (6,539 points)
    - Overall title winner: Russia (41,159 points)
  - July 5 & 6: European Cup Combined Events First and Second League in (Portugal) Ribeira Brava
    - First League decathlon winner: (Czech Republic) Adam Helcelet (7,955 points)
    - First League heptathlon winner: (Czech Republic) Eliška Klučinová (6,191 points)
    - Second League decathlon winner: (Belgium) Niels Pittomvils (8,000 points)
    - Second League heptathlon winner: (Greece) Sofia Yfantidou (5,806 points)
    - Promotion to Super League: Czech Republic (40,384 points)
    - Relegated to First League: Poland (36,879 points)
    - Note: Ribeira Brava replaced Donetsk in hosting the First and Second Leagues, due to the annexation of Crimea by the Russian Federation.
  - July 17 & 18: Pan American Combined Events Cup in (Canada) Ottawa
    - Decathlon winner: (Cuba) Yordanis Garcia (8,179 points)
    - Heptathlon winner: (Canada) Natasha Jackson (5,928 points)
  - July 27 – August 2: Part of the 2014 Commonwealth Games
    - Decathlon winner: (Canada) Damian Warner (8,282 points)
    - Heptathlon winner: (Canada) Brianne Theisen-Eaton (6,597 points)
  - August 10–14: Part of the 2014 African Championships in Athletics
    - Decathlon winner: (Algeria) Larbi Bouraada (8,311 points)
    - Heptathlon winner: (Burkina Faso) Marthe Koala (5,454 points)
  - August 12–17: Part of the 2014 European Athletics Championships
    - Decathlon winner: (Belarus) Andrei Krauchanka (8,616 points)
    - Heptathlon winner: (France) Antoinette Nana Djimou (6,551 points)
  - September 20 & 21: Décastar in (France) Talence
    - Decathlon winner: (Estonia) Mikk Pahapill (8,077 points)
    - Heptathlon winner: (Germany) Carolin Schäfer (6,383 points)
  - September 26 – October 3: Part of the 2014 Asian Games in (South Korea) Incheon (final)
    - Decathlon -> Winner: (Japan) Keisuke Ushiro (8,088 points); Second: (Uzbekistan) Leonid Andreev (7,879 points); Third: (Japan) Akihiko Nakamura (7,828 points)
    - Heptathlon -> Winner: (Uzbekistan) Ekaterina Voronina (5,912 points); Second: (China) Wang Qingling (5,856 points); Third: (Uzbekistan) Yuliya Tarasova (5,482 points)
  - Overall winners: (Germany) Rico Freimuth (m) / (Netherlands) Nadine Broersen (f)
- May 24 & 25: 2014 IAAF World Relays at (The Bahamas) Nassau (debut event)
  - Men's 4 × 100 m team winner: Jamaica
  - Men's 4 × 200 m team winner: Jamaica (**World Record**)
  - Men's 4 × 400 m team winner: United States
  - Men's 4 × 800 m team winner: Kenya
  - Men's 4x1,500m team winner: Kenya (**World Record**)
  - Women's 4 × 100 m team winner: United States
  - Women's 4 × 200 m team winner: United States
  - Women's 4 × 400 m team winner: United States
  - Women's 4 × 800 m team winner: United States
  - Women's 4x1,500m team winner: Kenya
- July 22–27: 2014 World Junior Championships in Athletics at Eugene
  - The United States won both the gold and overall medal tallies.
- August 10–14: 2014 African Championships in Athletics in (Morocco) Marrakesh
  - South Africa won the gold medal tally. Kenya won the overall medal tally.
- August 12–17: 2014 European Athletics Championships at (Switzerland) Zürich
  - Great Britain won the gold medal tally. France and Great Britain won 23 overall medals each.
- August 20–26: 2014 Summer Youth Olympics
  - Host nation, China, won the gold medal tally. Ethiopia and Germany won 8 overall medals each.
- September 13 & 14: 2014 IAAF Continental Cup at (Morocco) Marrakesh
  - Men: Team Europe won both the gold and overall medal tallies.
  - Women: Team Americas won the gold medal tally. Team Europe won the overall medal tally.

== Season's bests ==
Best marks of the year
Event	Men			Women		
Event	Athlete	Mark	Notes	Athlete	Mark	Notes
60 metres	James Dasaolu (GBR)	6.47		Shelly-Ann Fraser-Pryce (JAM)	6.98	
100 metres	Justin Gatlin (USA)	9.77		Tori Bowie (USA)	10.80	
200 metres	Justin Gatlin (USA)	19.68		Allyson Felix (USA)	22.02	
400 metres	Kirani James (GRN)	43.74		Francena McCorory (USA)	49.48	
800 metres	Nijel Amos (BOT)	1:42.45		Ajee' Wilson (USA)	1:57.67	
1500 metres	Silas Kiplagat (KEN)	3:27.64		Genzebe Dibaba (ETH)	3:55.17i	WR
Mile run	Ayanleh Souleiman (DJI)	3:47.32		Mary Cain (USA)	4:24.11i	
3000 metres	Caleb Ndiku (KEN)	7:31.66		Genzebe Dibaba (ETH)	8:16.60i	WR
5000 metres	Muktar Edris (ETH)	12:54.83		Genzebe Dibaba (ETH)	14:28.88	
10,000 metres	Galen Rupp (USA)	26:44.36		Sally Kipyego (KEN)	30:42.26	
60 metres hurdles	Pascal Martinot-Lagarde (FRA)	7.45		Sally Pearson (AUS)	7.79	
100/110 metres hurdles	Hansle Parchment (JAM)	12.94		Dawn Harper Nelson (USA)	12.44	
400 metres hurdles	Javier Culson (PUR)	48.03		Kaliese Spencer (JAM)	53.41	
3000 metres steeplechase	Jairus Birech (KEN)	7:58.41		Hiwot Ayalew (ETH)	9:10.64	
10K run	Stephen Sambu (KEN)	27:25		Betsy Saina (KEN)	30:46	
Half marathon	Abraham Cheroben (KEN)	58:48		Florence Kiplagat (KEN)	65:12	
Marathon	Dennis Kimetto (KEN)	2:02:57		Tirfe Tsegaye (ETH)	2:20:18^{[nb1]}	
20 kilometres race walk	Yusuke Suzuki (JPN)	1:18:17		Anisya Kirdyapkina (RUS)	1:26:31	
50 kilometres race walk	Yohann Diniz (FRA)	3:32:33		—		
Pole vault	Renaud Lavillenie (FRA)	6.16 mi		Fabiana Murer (BRA)	4.80 m	
High jump	Mutaz Essa Barshim (QAT)	2.43 m		Ruth Beitia (ESP)	2.01 m	
Long jump	Greg Rutherford (GBR)	8.51 m		Tianna Bartoletta (USA)	7.02 m	
Triple jump	Pedro Pablo Pichardo (CUB)	17.76 m		Caterine Ibargüen (COL)	15.31 m	
Shot put	Ryan Whiting (USA)	22.23i m		Valerie Adams (NZL)	20.67 m i	
Discus throw	Piotr Małachowski (POL)	69.28 m		Sandra Perković (CRO)	71.08 m	
Javelin throw	Ihab Abdelrahman (EGY)	89.21 m		Barbora Špotáková (CZE)	67.99 m	
Hammer throw	Paweł Fajdek (POL)	83.48 m		Anita Włodarczyk (POL)	79.58 m	
Pentathlon	—			Nadine Broersen (NED)	4830 pts	
Heptathlon	Ashton Eaton (USA)	6632 pts		Katarina Johnson-Thompson (GBR)	6682 pts	
Decathlon	Andrei Krauchanka (BLR)	8616 pts		—		
4×100 metres relay	Jamaica (JAM); Jason Livermore; Kemar Bailey-Cole; Nickel Ashmeade; Usain Bolt	37.58		Jamaica (JAM); Kerron Stewart; Veronica Campbell-Brown; Schillonie Calvert; Shelly-Ann Fraser-Pryce	41.83	
4×400 metres relay	United States (USA); David Verburg; Tony McQuay; Christian Taylor; LaShawn Merritt	2:57.25		Americas (AME); Christine Day; Francena McCorory; Stephenie Ann McPherson; Novlene Williams-Mills	3:20.93	

- ^{nb1} Two faster women's marathon times were set at the 2014 Boston Marathon: 2:18:57 by Rita Jeptoo and 2:19:59 by Buzunesh Deba. The Boston Marathon course, however, is ineligible for record purposes. Jeptoo also failed a doping test prior to setting the time, making it an invalid one.
