= Aynalem Desta =

Ethiopian long-distance runner

Personal information
- Born: 21 January 2004 (age 22)

Sport
- Country: Ethiopia
- Sport: Long-distance running
- Event: Marathon

Achievements and titles
- Personal bests: Half marathon: 1:12:19 (Bogotá 2025); Marathon: 2:17:06 (Amsterdam 2026)

Aynalem Desta (born 21 January 2004) is an Ethiopian long-distance runner.

== Career ==
Desta opened her career running the 3000 metres steeplechase but she then made her half-marathon debut in 2023 winning the Yiwu half marathon. She then made her marathon debut in 2024 winning the Malaga Marathon with a time of 2:25:10.

In June 2025 she won the Bogotá Half Marathon and she followed that in October by winning the Amsterdam Marathon with a time of 2:17:37. She entered in the 2026 Nagoya Women's Marathon and claimed bronze in a race which was ultimately won by Sheila Chepkirui. She returned to the Bogota Half Marathon and placed 3rd with a time of 1:12:32. Then she came back to the Amsterdam marathon and placed second while running a new personal best 2:17:06.
