= Wilson Chebet =

Kenyan long-distance runner (born 1985)

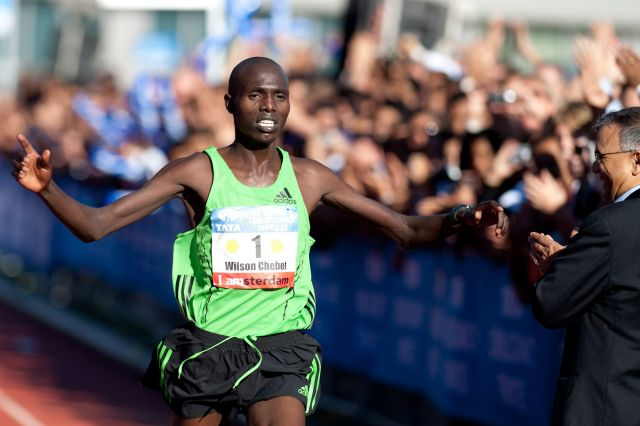
- Wilson Chebet during 2011 Amsterdam Marathon

Personal information
- Full name: Wilson Kwambai Chebet
- Nationality: Kenyan
- Born: 12 July 1985 (age 40) Marakwet District, Kenya

Sport
- Country: Kenya
- Sport: Athletics
- Event(s): Half marathon, Marathon

Achievements and titles
- Personal best(s): Half marathon: 59:15 (2009); Marathon: 2:05:27 (Rotterdam 2011)
Medal record
Men's athletics
Representing Kenya
World Half Marathon Championships
Gold medal – first place	2009 Birmingham	Team competition
Marathons
Gold medal – first place	2011 Rotterdam	Marathon
Gold medal – first place	2011 Amsterdam	Marathon
Gold medal – first place	2012 Amsterdam	Marathon
Gold medal – first place	2013 Amsterdam	Marathon

Wilson Kwambai Chebet (born 12 July 1985, in Marakwet District) is a Kenyan professional long-distance runner who specialises in road running competitions. He has a marathon best of 2:05:27 hours.

He began competing internationally in 2005 and established himself with a number of circuit wins in his first three years of competition, including the Marseille-Cassis Classique Internationale and America's Finest City Half Marathon. He managed podium finishes at the Granollers Half Marathon, Rotterdam Half Marathon and Delhi Half Marathon in 2008. He represented Kenya at the 2009 IAAF World Half Marathon Championships and helped win the team gold medal.

Chebet began pacemaking in marathon races in 2009 and made his competitive debut over the distance in 2010. His clocking of two hours, 6:12 minutes to finish as runner-up at the Amsterdam Marathon was the second fastest debut run of all time. In 2011, won both the Amsterdam and Rotterdam Marathons. He repeated as Amsterdam champion in 2012.

His half marathon best of 59:15 minutes ranks among the top 15 fastest ever and he is in the top ten fastest ever over 20 km.

== Career ==
=== Early career ===
Running in Kenya, he began entering elite competitions as a teenager: he placed top-ten at the 2004 Tegla Loroupe Peace Race and he took second place in a 15K road race in January 2005 behind Clement Koech. He made his debut on the European circuit later that year, winning at the Route du Vin Half Marathon in September in 1:02:19 and then going on to finish tenth at the Paris 20K the following month. In January 2006 he returned to his native country and ran at the Discovery Kenya Cross Country and finished third in a long race won by Moses Masai. He ran a series of races in Spain from March to April, starting with a win at the Ribarroja del Turia Half Marathon, before taking third in the Azkoitia-Azpeitia race, second at the Málaga Half Marathon behind Silas Sang and ending with a podium finish at the Gran Fondo Nacional Villa de Massamagrell.

His 2006 season peaked at road races in the United States: he won America's Finest City Half Marathon in San Diego with a time of 1:02:38 and later that month he ran at the Crim 10-Mile Race and was the runner-up Samuel Kosgei. Two months later he won the Medical Center 10K Classic in Bowling Green, Kentucky. He returned to the Route du Vin race in 2007 and took his second win, this time setting a course record of 1:00:13 (a personal best). He also won at the Marseille-Cassis Classique Internationale in France – his time of 59:24 was the second fastest winning time for the course. In December that year he ran at the Lagos Half Marathon and finished runner-up to Dieudonné Disi.

=== Half marathon specialist ===
He ran extensively in 2008, beginning with a second-place run at the Granollers Half Marathon behind then world record holder Samuel Wanjiru. Surprisingly, he ran in the Barcelona Half Marathon only seven days later and managed to finish as runner-up to Jacob Yator. This was followed by a fourth place at the Paris Half Marathon in March and a second victory at the Ribarroja Half Marathon in April. He ran under an hour for the half marathon in September, clocking a time of 59:33 for third place behind world medallists Evans Cheruiyot and Patrick Makau at the Rotterdam Half Marathon. Looking for a title defence, he returned to the Marseille-Cassis race and managed to fend off a challenge from Disi (his rival in Lagos) to increase his winning streak. He was among the leaders at the Delhi Half Marathon in September, his last major run of the year, and he was one second off his personal best with a third-place finish.

He knocked a second off his best in a quick RAK Half Marathon in February 2009, where the winner Patrick Makau set the second fastest mark ever. He gained his first major win over 20 km in the Netherlands three weeks later at the 20 van Alphen race. He was employed as the pacemaker for the Rotterdam Marathon and excelled in the role, leading and keeping the pace strong among the racers – work which resulted in Duncan Kibet completing the third fastest ever time for the marathon. Following this, he managed half marathon wins at the Pardubice Wine Half-Marathon and Rabat International Half-Marathon. He ran at the tenth edition of the Bogota International Half Marathon in August, but was beaten to the finish line by Isaac Macharia. His best run of the year came at the Rotterdam Half Marathon as he set a new best of 59:15 for the event, which was the seventh fastest time by any athlete in 2009. However, such was the quality of the race, this fast time was only enough for fifth place in Rotterdam. The performance earned him his first international selection Kenya and he took sixth place in the men's race at the 2009 IAAF World Half Marathon Championships in Birmingham, a finish which earned him the team gold medal alongside Bernard Kiprop Kipyego and Wilson Kipsang Kiprotich.

The Zayed International Half Marathon was his first stop of 2010, but he only managed to finish in sixth. He set his sights on completing the Prague Half Marathon unbeaten: "Although I have run better than 60 minutes four times, I have not won. I need now to win one in under one hour". He left the race with his desire unfulfilled, however, as he finished in over an hour behind fellow countryman Joel Kemboi. After doing pacemaking duties at the Lake Biwa Marathon, he was present at Haile Gebrselassie's sports resort opening in May and won the inaugural Everyone Half Marathon in Addis Ababa. He returned to Europe that month to run at the Göteborgsvarvet half marathon and he was the second runner across the line after Sammy Kirui Kiprono.

=== Marathons ===
Travelling to the United States in August, he entered the Beach to Beacon 10K in Cape Elizabeth, Maine but relinquished his lead in the final stages to end up third behind Gebregziabher Gebremariam and Alan Kiprono. Chebet and Gebre went head-to-head a week later at the Falmouth Road Race but again the Kenyan was beaten to the finish, finishing one second behind his Ethiopian counterpart. He took part in the Amsterdam Marathon in October and this time he left the pacemaking duties to Jamal Baligha as he marked his competitive debut over the full 42.195 km distance. Ethiopian Getu Feleke was running at course record pace, but Chebet was the only runner to challenge him. Although Getu eventually won the race almost half a minute ahead of him, Chebet finished the race with a time of 2:06:12 – the second fastest ever time for a marathon debut after Evans Rutto's debut winning run at the 2003 Chicago Marathon. Although victory had yet again evaded the Kenyan, he was pleased and confident with the result: "This is great making your debut with the second fastest (such time) ever. I’m happy. I know now what a marathon is and I think I can do faster."

In April 2011, he won his first marathon, at Rotterdam, in the year's best time of 2:05:27 – six seconds ahead of his village mate Vincent Kipruto. He placed third in the Bogotá Half Marathon in August. He recorded a second consecutive win and sub-2:06 run at the 2011 Amsterdam Marathon, finishing just outside the course record with his time of 2:05:53 hours. His first major race of 2012 came at the Boston Marathon, where he came in fifth place. He was third at the lower profile Bogotá Half Marathon in July. In October he won the Amsterdam Marathon with a time of 2:05:41, a new course record.

The following year he was fourth at the World's Best 10K and third at the Tilburg Ten Miles. He made a triumphant return at the Amsterdam Marathon, improving his own record to 2:05:36 hours.

== Major competition record ==
Year	Competition	Venue	Position	Notes
2009	World Half Marathon Championships	Birmingham, England	6th	Half marathon
2009	World Half Marathon Championships	Birmingham, England	1st	Team competition
