= Kwambai =

Kwambai is a surname of Kenyan origin that may refer to:

- Irene Kwambai (born 1978), Kenyan long-distance track runner
- James Kwambai (born 1983), Kenyan marathon runner and two-time winner of the JoongAng Seoul Marathon
- Wilson Kwambai Chebet (born 1985), Kenyan marathon runner and two-time Amsterdam Marathon winner
