= Angela Tanui =

Kenyan athlete (born 1992)

Personal information
- Nationality: Kenyan
- Born: 27 July 1992 (age 33)

Sport
- Sport: Athletics
- Event: Marathon

Angela Tanui (born 27 July 1992) is a Kenyan marathon runner.

== Career ==
Tanui trains in Iten in Elgeyo Marakwet County, in her home country of Kenya. She ran a new course record time of 2:17:57 to win the 2021 Amsterdam Marathon in October 2021. Tanui finished fourth at the 2022 Tokyo Marathon. Tanui won the 2022 edition of the Bogotá Half Marathon in a time of 1:13:29.

She was selected by Kenya to run in the 2022 World Athletics Championships – Women's marathon in which she finished sixth.

== Personal bests ==
- 10 kilometres – 31:51 (Langueux 2014)
- Half marathon – 1:07:43 (Ostia 2017)
- Marathon – 2:17:57 (Amsterdam 2021)
