= Geoffrey Toroitich =

Kenyan long-distance runner (born 2000)

Personal information
- Nationality: Kenyan
- Born: Geoffrey Toroitich Kipchumba; February 1, 2000 (age 26) Kenya
- Occupation: Long-distance runner
- Years active: 2023–present

Sport
- Country: Kenya
- Sport: Athletics
- Event(s): Marathon, Half marathon

Achievements and titles
- Personal bests: Marathon: 2:03:31 (2025); Half marathon: 59:13 (2023)
Medal record
Men's Athletics
Representing Kenya
World Marathon Majors
Silver medal – second place	2026 Tokyo	Marathon

Geoffrey Toroitich Kipchumba (born February 1, 2000) is a Kenyan long-distance runner specializing in the marathon and half marathon. He won the 2025 Amsterdam Marathon, breaking its course record. He also had a top-6 finish at a World Marathon Major. His personal bests are a 59:13 half marathon and a 2:03:31 marathon.

== Career ==
In October 2023, Toroitich ran a personal best of 59:13 to win the Malaga Half Marathon, one of the fastest times recorded globally that season. Later that year, he added another victory by winning the inaugural Kong-Zhuhai-Macau Bridge Half Marathon in 1:01:38. Toroitich successfully defended his Málaga Half Marathon title in 2024 with a time of 1:00:13.

In 2025, Toroitich transitioned to the marathon with immediate success. He placed sixth at the 2025 Tokyo Marathon, a World Marathon Major, setting a personal best of 2:05:46. In October 2025 he won the 50th anniversary edition of the Amsterdam Marathon in a new course record of 2:03.31.

== Personal bests ==
- Marathon: 2:05:46 (Tokyo, 2 March 2025)
- Half Marathon: 59:13 (Málaga, 29 October 2023)
- 10 Miles Road: 45:17 (17 September 2022)

== Major results ==
Year	Race	City	Position	Time
2023	Malaga Half Marathon	Málaga	1st	59:13 (PB)
2023	Kong-Zhuhai-Macau Bridge Half Marathon	Hong Kong / Macau / Zhuhai	1st	1:01:38
2024	Malaga Half Marathon	Málaga	1st	1:00:13
2025	Tokyo Marathon	Tokyo	6th	2:05:46 (PB)
2025	Amsterdam Marathon	Amsterdam	1st	2:03:31 (CR)
