= Corrida de Langueux =

Road running competition in France

Coordinates: 48.4943°N 2.7139°W

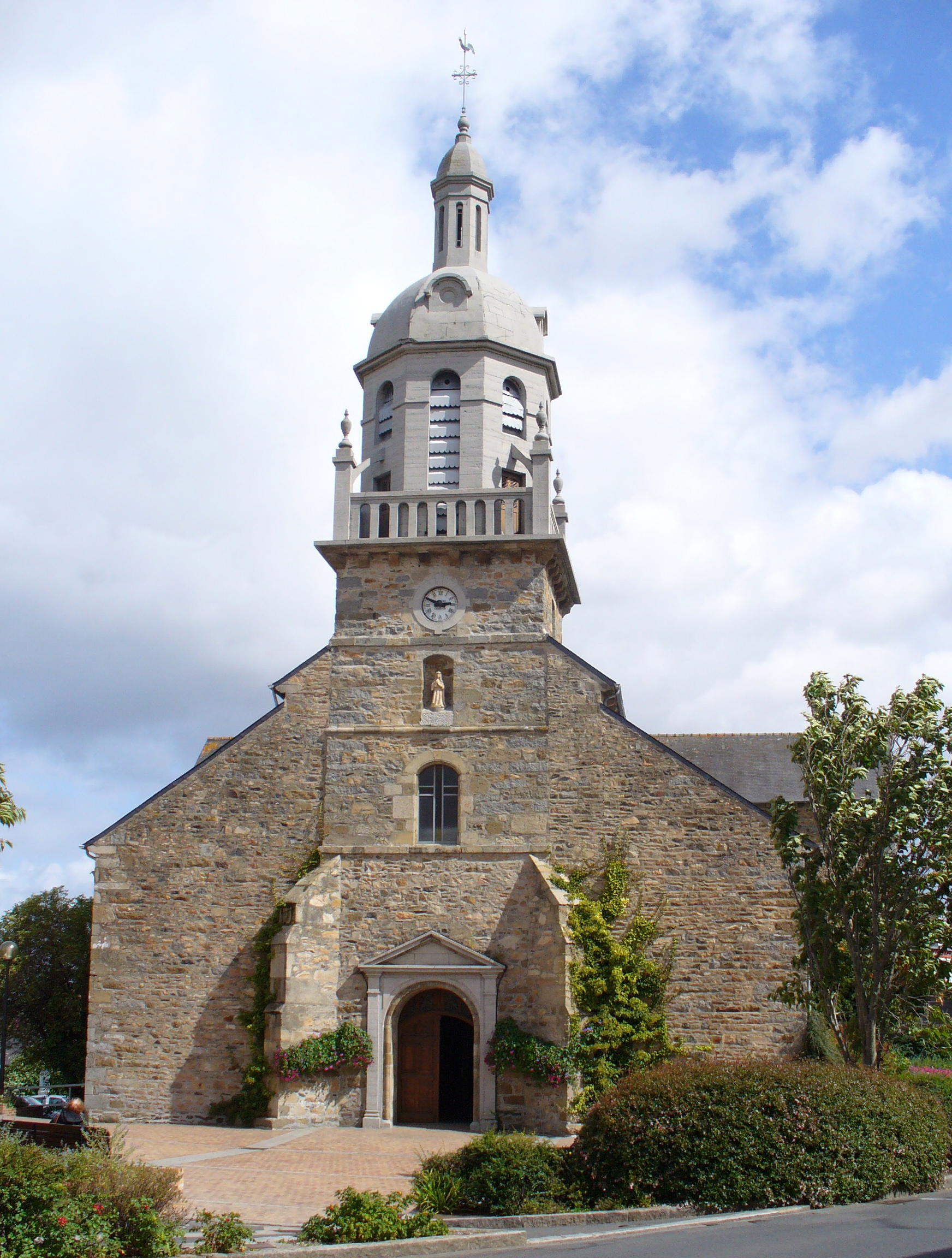
- The Church of Langueux sits at the centre of the course
- Date: June
- Location: Langueux, France
- Event type: Road
- Distance: 10K
- Established: 1991
- Course records: Men's: 27:36 (2022) (Kenya) Geoffrey Toroitich; Women's: 30:28 (2023) (Ethiopia) Alem Nigussie
- Website: Official website
- Participants: 165 (2019)

The Corrida de Langueux is an annual 10 kilometres road running competition which is held in Langueux, Brittany, France, every June. The competition is organised by the Union Athlétique Langueux. The elite 10K races for men and women have IAAF Bronze Label Road Race status. The race was selected to be the French 10K championship race in 2003, 2008 and 2010.

There are elite and popular races over 10 km, as well as a races for younger athletes and wheelchair racers. Furthermore, an annual 20 km hike (la randonnée) is held in conjunction with the running events. The hike takes walkers across the Bay of Saint-Brieuc at low tide and then through the peninsula of Hillion. In 2009 over 500 people took part in the hike, over 450 young runners took part in the youth race, and over 850 runners ran the popular 10K race. In total, the day's events attract almost 2000 participants every year, from elite runners to disabled athletes. On top of this, around 15,000 spectators watch the race in the centre of the village – a number which is twice the population of Langueux.

The course is double-looped and encompasses the village centre, passing points of interest including the Langueux church and sports complex. Past winners of the race include 1998 Olympic fourth placer Jean-Louis Prianon, World Championship marathon runner Nadia Ejjafini, and 2006 Lille Half Marathon winner Meriem Wangari.

The course records for the race are 27:46 minutes for men, set by Atsedu Tsegay in 2011, and 31:20 minutes for women, set by Clémence Calvin in 2018.

== Past elite 10K winners ==
Key: Course record Country's championship race

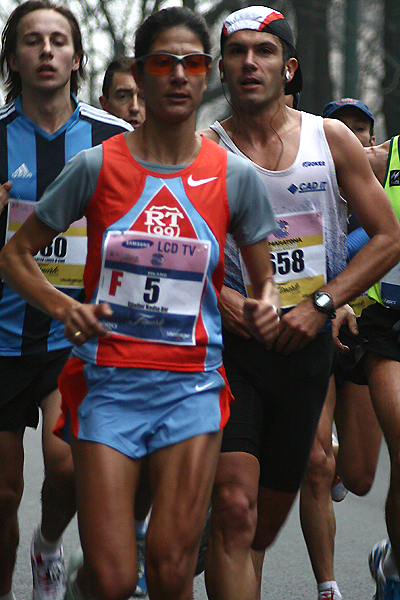
Nadia Ejjafini won back-to-back titles in 2006 and 2007.

Edition	Year	Men's winner	Time (m:s)	Women's winner	Time (m:s)
1st	1991	Joël Lucas (FRA)		Denise Le Blanc (FRA)	
2nd	1992	Didier Bernard (FRA)		Odile Tournevache (FRA)	
3rd	1993	Jean-Louis Prianon (FRA)		Valérie Chauvel (FRA)	
4th	1994	Noureddine Sobhi (FRA)		Odile Ohier (FRA)	
5th	1995	Julius Koech (KEN)		Selina Chirchir (KEN)	
6th	1996	Didier Sainthorand (FRA)		Valentina Enachi (MDA)	
7th	1997	John Gwako (KEN)		Restituta Joseph (TAN)	
8th	1998	Julius Koech (KEN)		Jackline Torori (KEN)	
9th	1999	Phaustin Baha Sulle (TAN)		Restituta Joseph (TAN)	
10th	2000	David Maina (KEN)		Nancy Omwenga (KEN)	
11th	2001	Mickaël Thomas (FRA)		Nancy Omwenga (KEN)	
12th	2002	George Morara (KEN)	28:47	Nancy Omwenga (KEN)	33:33
13th	2003	George Morara (KEN)	28:19	Fatima Yvelain (FRA)	32:44
14th	2004	Gordon Mahugu (KEN)	28:46	Carmen Oliveras (FRA)	33:24
15th	2005	Francis Wachira (KEN)	28:46	Corinne Raux (FRA)	33:52
16th	2006	Samir Eraouia (MAR)	28:45	Nadia Ejjafini (BHR)	32:28
17th	2007	Abdellah Falil (MAR)	27:56	Nadia Ejjafini (BHR)	32:39
18th	2008	El Hassan Lahssini (FRA)	28:45	Carmen Oliveras (FRA)	34:01
19th	2009	Rachid Kisri (MAR)	28:40	Meriem Wangari (KEN)	32:33
20th	2010	Azmeraw Bekele (ETH)	28:13	Meriem Wangari (KEN)	32:55
21st	2011	Atsedu Tsegay (ETH)	27:46	Meriem Wangari (KEN)	32:31
22nd	2012	Fikadu Haftu (ETH)	28:17	Christelle Daunay (FRA)	31:48
23rd	2013	Tesfaye Abera (ETH)	28:21	Fantu Eticha (ETH)	32:22
24th	2014	Victor Chumo (KEN)	28:18	Angela Tanui (KEN)	31:51
25th	2015	Simon Cheprot (KEN)	28:05	Gladys Yator (KEN)	31:40
26th	2016	Robert Kaptingei (KEN)	28:15	Meskerem Amare (ETH)	32:31
27th	2017	Dawit Fikadu (BHR)	28:43	Birhane Mihretu (ETH)	32:30
28th	2018	Moses Kibet (KEN)	28:26	Clémence Calvin (FRA)	31:20
29th	2019	Emmanuel Bor (KEN)	27:53	Tesfaye Haftu (ETH)	32:00
30th	2021	Morhad Amdouni (FRA)	28:27	Mekdes Woldu (ERI)	33:02
31st	2022	Geoffrey Toroitich (KEN)	27:36	Tigst Assefa (ETH)	30:52
32nd	2023	Emmanuel Bor (KEN)	27:46	Alem Nigussie (ETH)	30:28
33rd	2024	Samwel Mailu (KEN)	27:52	Abeba Aregawi (SWE)	31:05
