= Jørgen Jensen (runner) =

Danish runner (1944–2009)

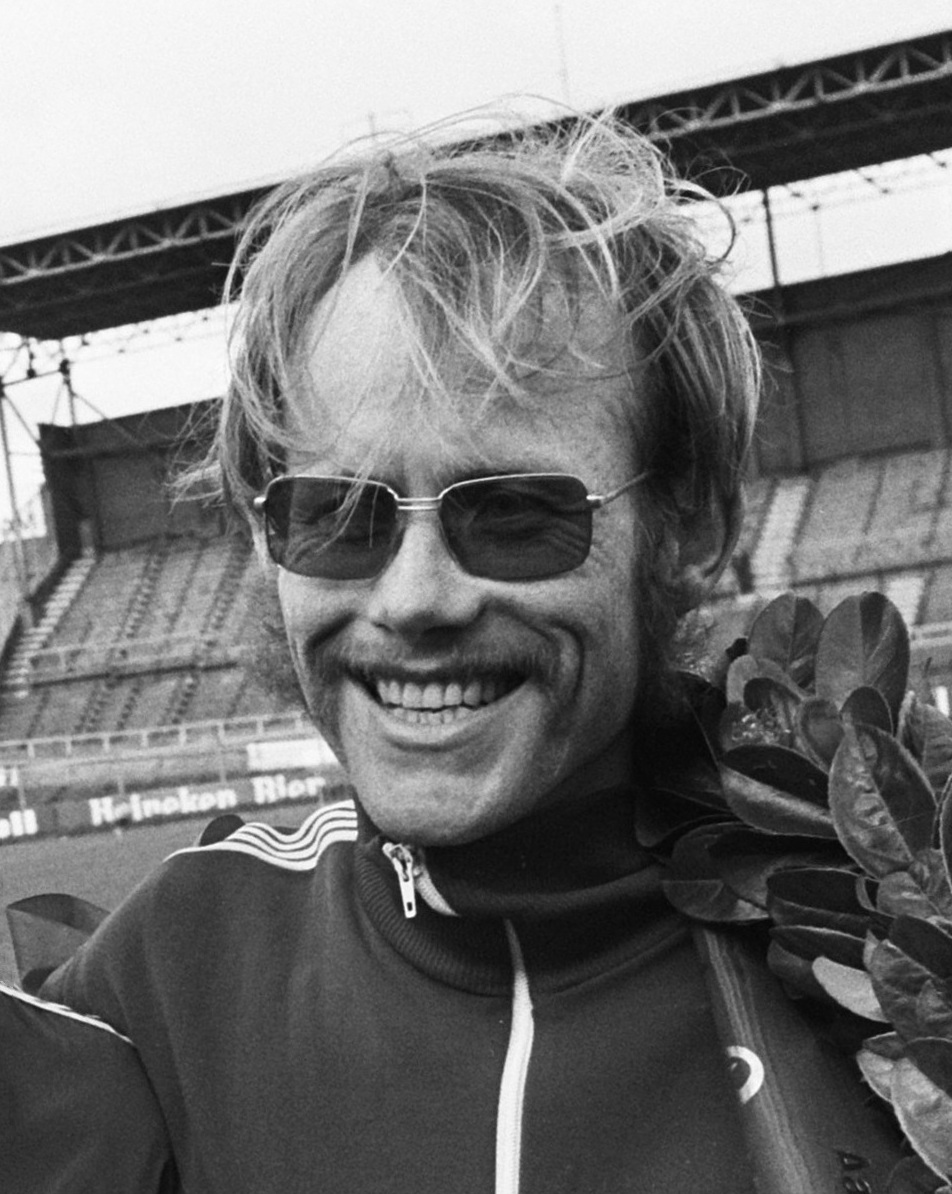
- Jensen at the Amsterdam Marathon 1975

Personal information
- Full name: Jørgen Pilegaard Jensen
- Born: 10 April 1944 Krønge, Lolland, German occupied Denmark
- Died: 2 October 2009 (aged 65) Århus, Denmark
- Height: 1.85 m (6 ft 1 in)
- Weight: 70 kg (154 lb)

Sport
- Sport: Middle- and long-distance running
- Club: AGF, Århus

Jørgen Pilegaard Jensen (10 April 1944 – 2 October 2009) was a Danish middle- and long-distance runner.

== Career ==
Jensen won the inaugural 1975 edition of Amsterdam Marathon on 3 May 1975, clocking 2:16:51. He ran the Olympic marathons in 1972 and 1976 and finished in 30th and 28th place, respectively.

Between 1966 and 1976 Jensen won eight national team titles (4 × 1500 m relay and cross-country) and eight individual titles, in the 5000 m (1966), 10000 m (1973), 20 km (1972 and 1974) and marathon (1973–1976).

== Achievements ==
Year	Competition	Venue	Position	Event	Notes
Representing Denmark
1972	Olympic Games	Munich, Germany	30th	Marathon	2:24:00
1975	Amsterdam Marathon	Amsterdam, Netherlands	1st	Marathon	2:16:51
1975	Košice Peace Marathon	Košice, Czechoslovakia	4th	Marathon	2:17:00
1975	Fukuoka Marathon	Fukuoka, Japan	24th	Marathon	2:18:45
1976	Olympic Games	Montreal, Canada	28th	Marathon	2:20:44
