= Malaga Marathon =

Annual race in Spain since 2010

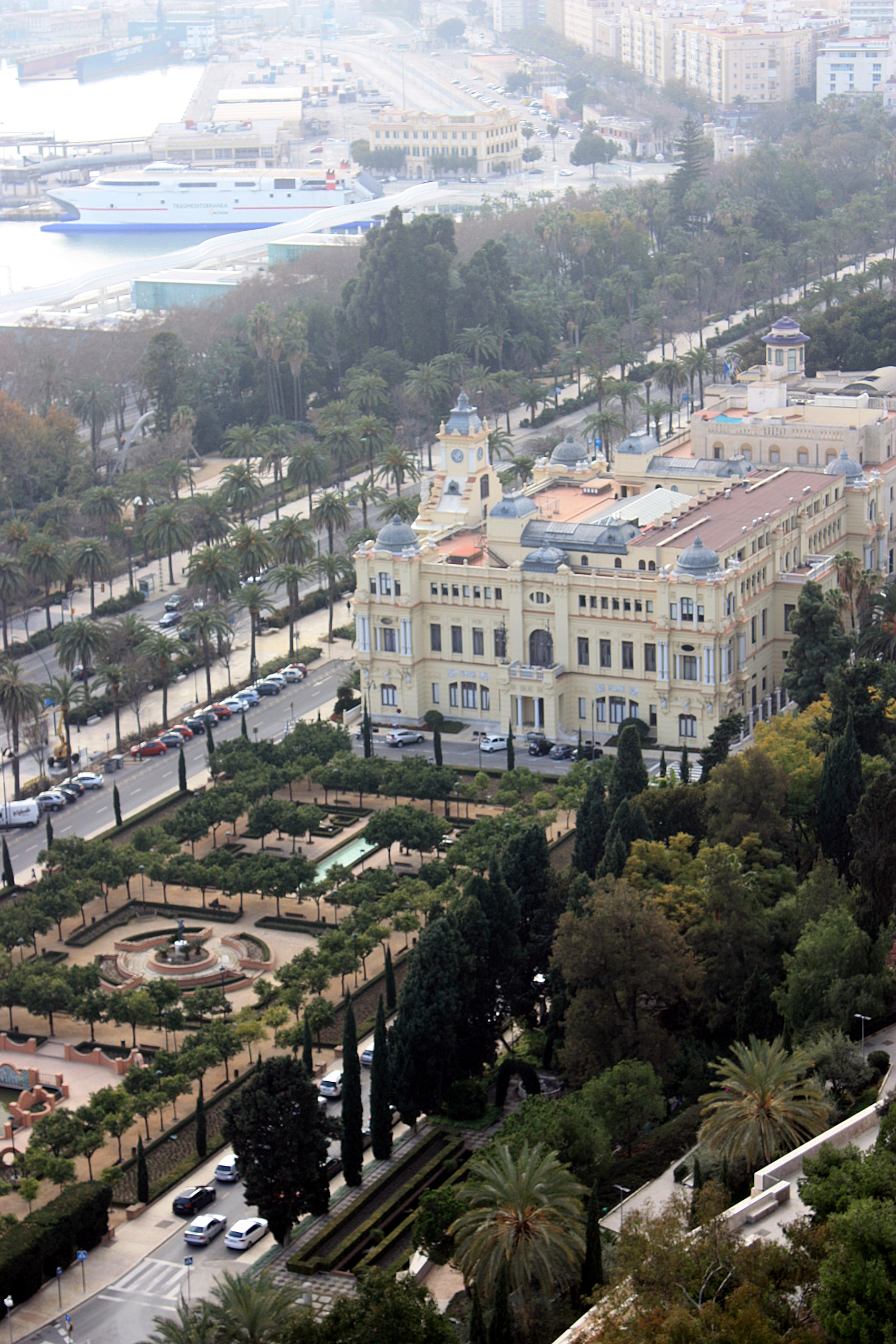
- The start and finish area on the Paseo del Parque, in front of Málaga City Hall
- Date: December
- Location: Málaga, Málaga, Andalusia, Spain
- Event type: Road
- Distance: Marathon, half marathon
- Established: 2010 (16 years ago)
- Website: Official website

The Malaga Marathon (Spanish: Maratón Málaga or Maratón de Málaga (Note: For sponsorship reasons, it is also known as the "Generali Malaga Marathon", and was also known as the "Zurich Malaga Marathon" and the "Maratón Cabberty Málaga".)) is an annual road-based marathon hosted by Málaga, Spain, since 2010. The marathon is a World Athletics Label Road Race, and was a member of the Association of International Marathons and Distance Races (AIMS). (Note: The race was listed in the AIMS directory in early 2023, but had been removed by late 2023.)

A half marathon is also held on the same day. The Malaga Half Marathon is a different race, generally held earlier in the year. (Note: In 2023, the Malaga Half Marathon was held in October. In 2024, it was held in March.) (Note: The organizers of the Malaga Marathon refer to the half marathon they hold on the same day as the "Generali Malaga Half Marathon".)

== History ==
The inaugural event was held on 6 December 2010 (Note: The day 6 December 2010 was a Monday.) as the "Maratón de Málaga". Organized by the Málaga City Council, the marathon was won by Spanish runners Juan Vázquez Sánchez and Blanca María Serrano, with finish times of 2:27:29 and 2:59:16, respectively. (Note: The Association of Road Racing Statisticians reported Sánchez's name as "Juan Francisco Sanchez".) Sánchez won the race by over seven minutes. Swedish runner Sandr Halvarsson crossed the finish line before Serrano, but was disqualified for lack of evidence proving that she covered the whole course. (Note: A runner named "Sandra Halvarsson" ran in the Malaga Half Marathon earlier that year.) Roughly 2,000 runners participated in the marathon. A disturbed man, who was tripping some of the participants, was quickly arrested. The marathon was held in conjunction with a 12 km (7.5 mi) race that used the first 12 km of the same course. The shorter race had 680 finishers.

The 2016 edition of the race was cancelled on the day of the race due to inclement weather.

The 2020 edition of the race was cancelled due to the coronavirus pandemic, with all registrants given the option of transferring their entry to 2021, or obtaining a refund (minus management fees).

In 2023, Spanish runner Ricardo Rosado sacrificed what would have been a fifth-place finish to help a fellow runner who was struggling to complete the race. Although Rosado's act violated the rules of World Athletics, the marathon organizers stated that they would not disqualify Rosado, and also awarded him the 500 EUR that he would have earned had he finished fifth.

== Course ==
The marathon is run on a loop course that begins and ends on the Paseo del Parque in Málaga Park, in front of Málaga City Hall. The first and last stretches are run on the same section of the Paseo del Parque, but in different directions. The half marathon shares the same start line as the marathon, but finishes nearby instead, outside the park.
