= Getu Feleke =

Ethiopian long-distance runner (born 1986)

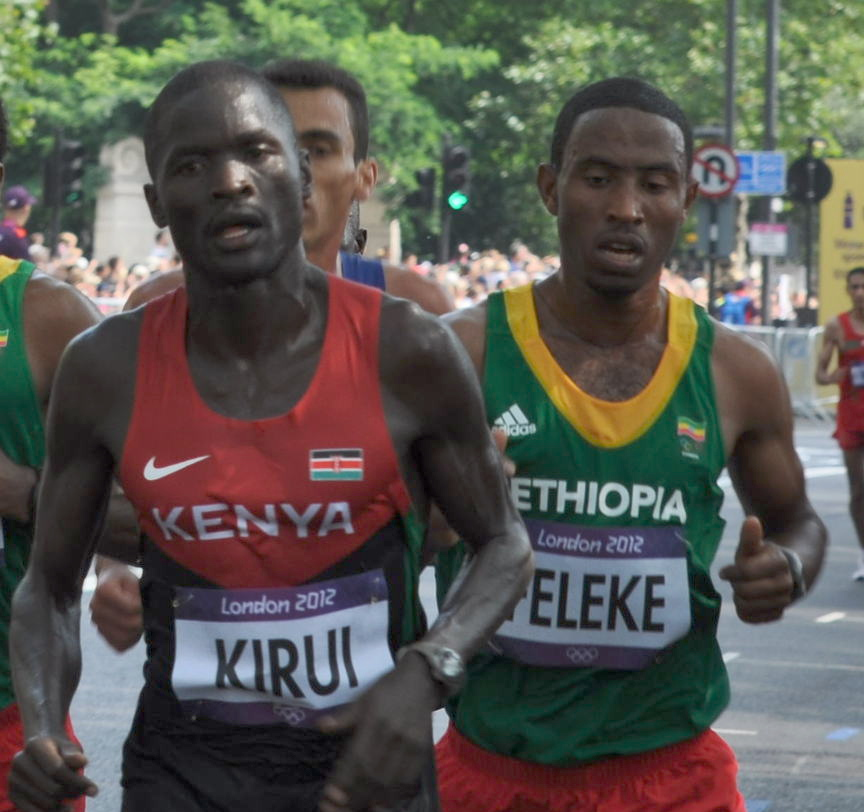
- Getu Feleke (right) at the 2012 Olympic marathon

Personal information
- Born: November 28, 1986 (age 39) Aleltu, Ethiopia
- Height: 176 cm (5 ft 9 in)
- Weight: 62 kg (137 lb)

Sport
- Country: Ethiopia
- Sport: Athletics
- Event: Marathon

Getu Feleke (Amharic:) ጌቱ ፈለቀ; born 28 November 1986) is an Ethiopian long-distance runner who runs mainly in half marathon and marathon races. He won the 2010 Amsterdam Marathon with a course record time of 2:05:44 and set his personal best of 2:04:50 hours in a second-place finish at the 2012 Rotterdam Marathon.

== Career ==
He began competing at the top level at the end of 2008, with his first major run coming at the Montferland Run 15K race. He was among the leaders at 10 km (6 mi) but fell back and eventually ended up in sixth place. He stepped up a distance for the City-Pier-City Half Marathon in March the following year and set a personal best of 1:00:36 for the event, taking fourth place behind fellow Ethiopian Dereje Tesfaye. His debut over the marathon distance came as part of a "débutantes only" theme at the Vienna City Marathon that year. He clocked a time of 2:11:42 which was enough for seventh place.

He returned to the Netherlands in September to run his first major 10-mile race – the Dam tot Damloop – and this time he reached the podium. By finishing in third place with a time of 45:29, he was only beaten by the experienced Kenyan runners Moses Masai and Charles Kamathi. The competition served as preparation for the Amsterdam Marathon the following month. In a quick-paced race, it was Kenyan Gilbert Yegon who won, beating Haile Gebrselassie's course record. Although he was three minutes behind, Feleke's run of 2:09:32 for eighth was still a large improvement to his personal best. A return to the Montferland Run, his last race of the year, saw no progress upon his 2008 performance, as he finished sixth for a second time.

Getu was one of four men to complete the RAK Half Marathon in under an hour in February 2010, his personal best run of 59:56 minutes bringing him fourth place. The Prague Marathon in May was his third race over the classic distance and he bettered his best yet again by recording a time of 2:08:04, although Nicholas Kipruto Koech beat him out of the top three. He did not compete again until October when he returned to the Amsterdam Marathon, entering the race as the fourth fastest on paper. He left the competition as the fastest man, slicing over half a minute off Yegon's year-old course record with a run of 2:05:44. He paid thanks to his trainer, former athlete Getaneh Tessema, for his first victory over the distance with a time establishing him as the fifth fastest Ethiopian ever over the marathon.

He returned to the RAK Half Marathon at the start of the following year but was a minute and a half off his best time, finishing in sixth. He did not compete for the rest of the year, but returned at the 2012 Paris Half Marathon, taking fifth in a time of 1:01:59 hours. This served as preparation for the Rotterdam Marathon. That race came down to a sprint finish against Yemane Tsegay and although ended up as runner-up by two seconds, he still set a personal best of 2:04:50 hours (making him joint ninth on the all-time lists). This gained him selection for the Olympic marathon, but he ended up dropping out of the race. He closed the year with a third-place finish at the Montferland Run.

Getu was seventh at the RAK Half Marathon in January 2013, then he repeated as the runner-up at the Rotterdam Marathon, this time behind Tilahun Regassa.

In April 2014 Getu Feleke won the Vienna City Marathon by setting a new course record with his finishing time of 2:05:41.
