= 2014 Italian Athletics Championships =

- Dates: 18–20 July
- Host city: Rovereto
- Venue: Stadio Quercia
- Level: Senior
- Events: 42

The 2014 Italian Athletics Championships (Italian: Campionati italiani assoluti di atletica leggera 2014) was the 104th edition of the Italian Athletics Championships and were held in Rovereto from 18 to 20 July 2014.

== Champions ==
Event	Men	Performance	Women	Performance
100 m	Delmas Obou	10.33 (+0.7)	Irene Siragusa	11.51 (-1.2)
200 m	Diego Marani	20.47 (+0.1)	Irene Siragusa	23.27 (-1.4)
400 m	Matteo Galvan	45.58	Libania Grenot	50.55
800 m	Giordano Benedetti	1:49.09	Marta Milani	2:05.01
1500 m	Mohad Abdikadar Sheik	3:46.63	Federica Del Buono	4:10.26
5000 m	Marouan Razine	14:13.88	Giulia Viola	15:55.98
3000 m steeplechase	Patrick Nasti	8:42.91	Valeria Roffino	9:53.82
110/100 m hurdles	Hassane Fofana	13.60 (+1.4)	Marzia Caravelli	13.07 (+0.0)
400 m hurdles	Leonardo Capotosti	50.17	Yadisleidy Pedroso	55.84
High jump	Gianmarco Tamberi	2.22	Alessia Trost	1.90
Pole vault	Giorgio Piantella	5.40	Roberta Bruni	4.30
Long jump	Emanuele Catania	7.98 (+1.3)	Tania Vicenzino	6.51 (+1.0)
Triple jump	Fabrizio Schembri	16.61 (-0.1)	Dariya Derkach	13.10 (-0.6)
Shot put	Daniele Secci	18.55	Chiara Rosa	17.21
Discus throw	Hannes Kirchler	62.73	Valentina Aniballi	55.54
Hammer throw	Nicola Vizzoni	75.99	Micaela Mariani	66.24
Javelin throw	Norbert Bonvecchio	78.96	Sara Jemai	53.85
10 km walk road	Giorgio Rubino	40:13:00	Antonella Palmisano	45:15:00
4X100 relay	G.A. Fiamme Gialle; Fabio Cerutti; Fausto Desalu; Diego Marani; Delmas Obou	39.29	G.S. Forestale	45.06
4X400 relay	G.A. Fiamme Gialle	3:08.81	C.S. Esercito	3:38.44
Decatthlon/Heptathlon	Michele Calvi	7492	Flavia Nasella	5468
