= Peter Cheruiyot Kirui =

Kenyan long-distance runner (born 1988)

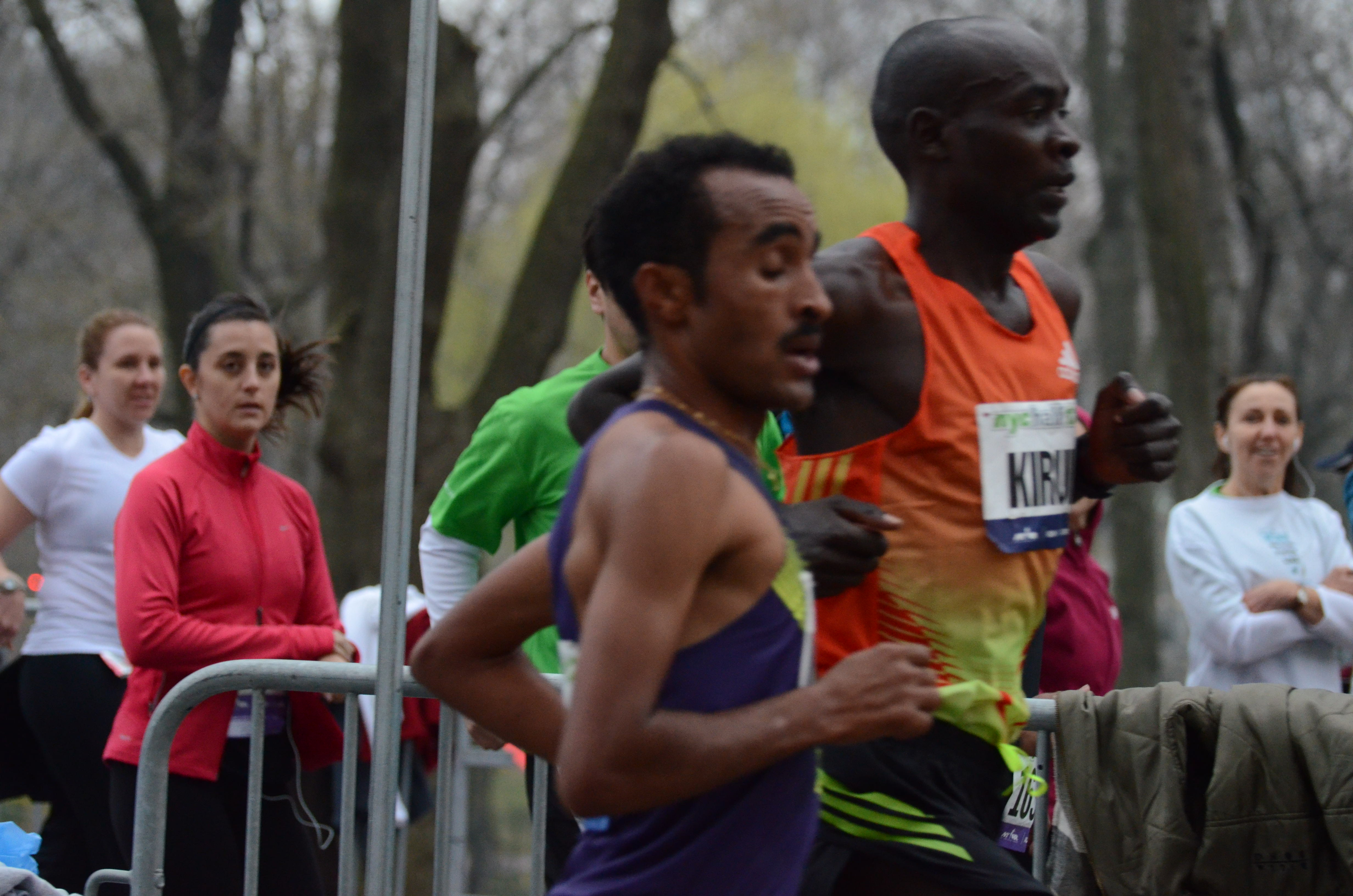
Kirui overtaking Deriba Merga at the 2012 New York Half Marathon

Peter Cheruiyot Kirui (born 2 January 1988) is a Kenyan professional long-distance runner who competes over 10,000 metres on the track and in road running competitions. He was the 2011 Kenyan champion over 10,000 m and came sixth at the 2011 World Championships in Athletics. He has acted as a pacemaker for major marathons (including Patrick Makau's world record in 2011) and has a marathon best of 2:06:31 hours. His best for the half marathon is 59:22 minutes.

== Career ==
Hailing from Bomet in Kenya, Kirui had his first foreign competition at the Cursa de Bombers in Barcelona and was runner-up to Josphat Menjo. He won the Carreira Popular in A Coruña in 2009 and was also fourth at the 15 km Villa de Massamagrell that year (which was also won by Menjo). He made his half marathon debut in 2009 and made the top four at the Nice Half Marathon, Udine Half Marathon and the Baringo Half Marathon. He ran on the track in Spain that summer, recording a 3000 metres best of 7:45.79 minutes in Zaragoza and a 5000 metres best of 13:15.90 minutes at the Barcelona Athletics Meeting.

At the start of 2010 he was runner-up at the Berlin Half Marathon, finishing just one second behind winner Eshetu Wondimu. He finished fifth at the Paderborn Easter Run. He ran in a series of races in the United States, winning the Lilac Bloomsday Run and taking the runner-up spots at the Utica Boilermaker, Peachtree Road Race and Bay to Breakers. He proved himself to be a competent pacemaker that year: he paced Patrick Makau to a time of 2:04:48 hours at the Rotterdam Marathon in April and helped Samuel Wanjiru to a time of 2:06:24 at the 2010 Chicago Marathon. Kirui closed his season with a ninth-place finish at the New Delhi Half Marathon.

Kirui established himself in his own right in 2011. In a close finish at the CPC Half Marathon, he ran a personal best time of 59:40 minutes, completing the distance in under an hour for the first time. He won the 10,000 metres race at the Kenyan Administration Police Championships and produced an upset at the Kenyan Athletics Championships by claiming the national title over the distance, beating African champion Wilson Kiprop and Boston Marathon winner Geoffrey Mutai among others. This gained him a place on the Kenyan team for the 2011 World Championships in Athletics in Daegu. He ran a personal best of 27:25.63 minutes in the event final, which brought him sixth place behind his compatriot Martin Mathathi.

Following his world championship appearance, he returned to pacemaking duties on the marathon circuit. He aided Patrick Makau to a world record time at the 2011 Berlin Marathon. Kirui also broke the world record time with his 30 km split of 1:27:38 hours in Berlin (although it was Makau who was given the record as he finished the race). A month later, Kirui set the pace for the Frankfurt Marathon until 35 km and not only did the winner Wilson Kipsang set the second fastest time in history, but Kirui managed to finish the race to set a marathon best of 2:06:33 hours for himself.

He began 2012 with a win at the New York Half Marathon, edging Deriba Merga in the latter stages to finish in a personal best of 59:39 minutes. Running in his second competitive marathon, Kirui dropped out of the Rotterdam Marathon after 30 km. He continued to perform well in the half distance, claiming a victory at the Bogotá Half Marathon that July. He managed tenth place at the Amsterdam Marathon.

Kirui failed to finish at the Lake Biwa Marathon. He attempted to gain a place in the 10,000 metres for the World Championships but came twelfth at the Kenyan Athletics Championships. He attempted to defend his Bogotá title in July, but was runner-up to Geoffrey Kipsang.

On April 5, 2014, he set a new personal record, running a half marathon in Prague in 59:22 minutes.
