= Amsterdam Marathon =

Annual marathon

- Logo of the Amsterdam Marathon in 2013
- Date: Third Sunday of October
- Location: Amsterdam, Netherlands
- Event type: Road
- Distance: Marathon (42.195 km)
- Primary sponsor: TCS
- Established: 1975 (51 years ago)
- Course records: Men's: 2:03:31 (2025) (Kenya) Geoffrey Toroitich; Women's: 2:16:10 (2026) (Ethiopia) Buze Diriba
- Website: www.tcsamsterdammarathon.eu
- Participants: 6,609 finishers (2021); 13,596 (2019)

The Amsterdam Marathon, currently branded as TCS Amsterdam Marathon, is an annual marathon (42.195 km) in Amsterdam in the Netherlands since 1975. The road race has a Platinum Label from World Athletics. The race weekend also offers a half marathon race (21.097 km) and an 7.5 km race in the program.

The current men's course record is 2:03:31 (h:m:s) set by Geoffrey Toroitich in 2025 and the current women's course record is 2:16:10 set by Buze Diriba in 2026.

Gerard Nijboer won this marathon four times, more than any other runner, in the 1980s. After him, Wilson Chebet has won three races in the 2010s.

The race celebrated its 50th anniversary in 2025.

== History ==
=== Before 1975 ===
The first marathon in Amsterdam was held on 5 August 1928, during the 1928 Summer Olympics. It was won by Boughera El Ouafi in 2:32:57.

After the Olympics there were no international marathons in Amsterdam until 1975.

=== 1975–1979 ===
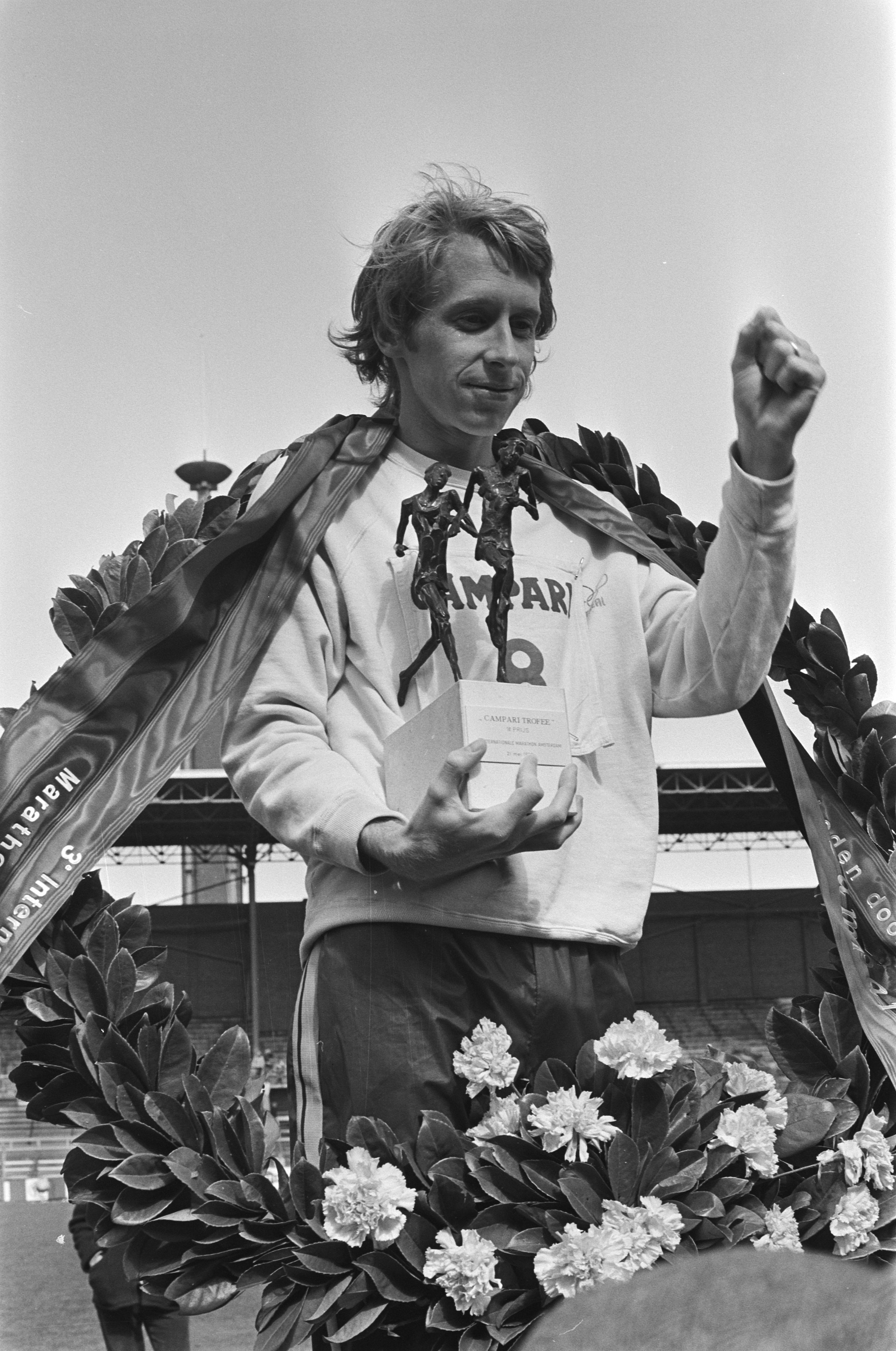
Bill Rodgers with the trophy and wreath after winning the 1977 edition

The first edition of the annual Amsterdam Marathon was held on 3 May 1975, as part of the city of Amsterdam's 700th anniversary celebrations. Danish runner Jørgen Jensen won the race in 2:16:51 and the Dutch Plonie Scheringa was the first woman to finish in 3:13:38.

The American Bill Rodgers won the 1977 edition and set a new men's course record of 2:12:47. In the women's category, Scheringa was fastest for a second time.

In 1978, the race was cancelled, because the sponsor withdrew support and the organisation was not able to find a new sponsor in time.

The 1979 marathon was able to take place and the Hungarian Ferenc Szekeres had his first victory, after finishing in third place two years earlier.

=== 1980–1989 ===
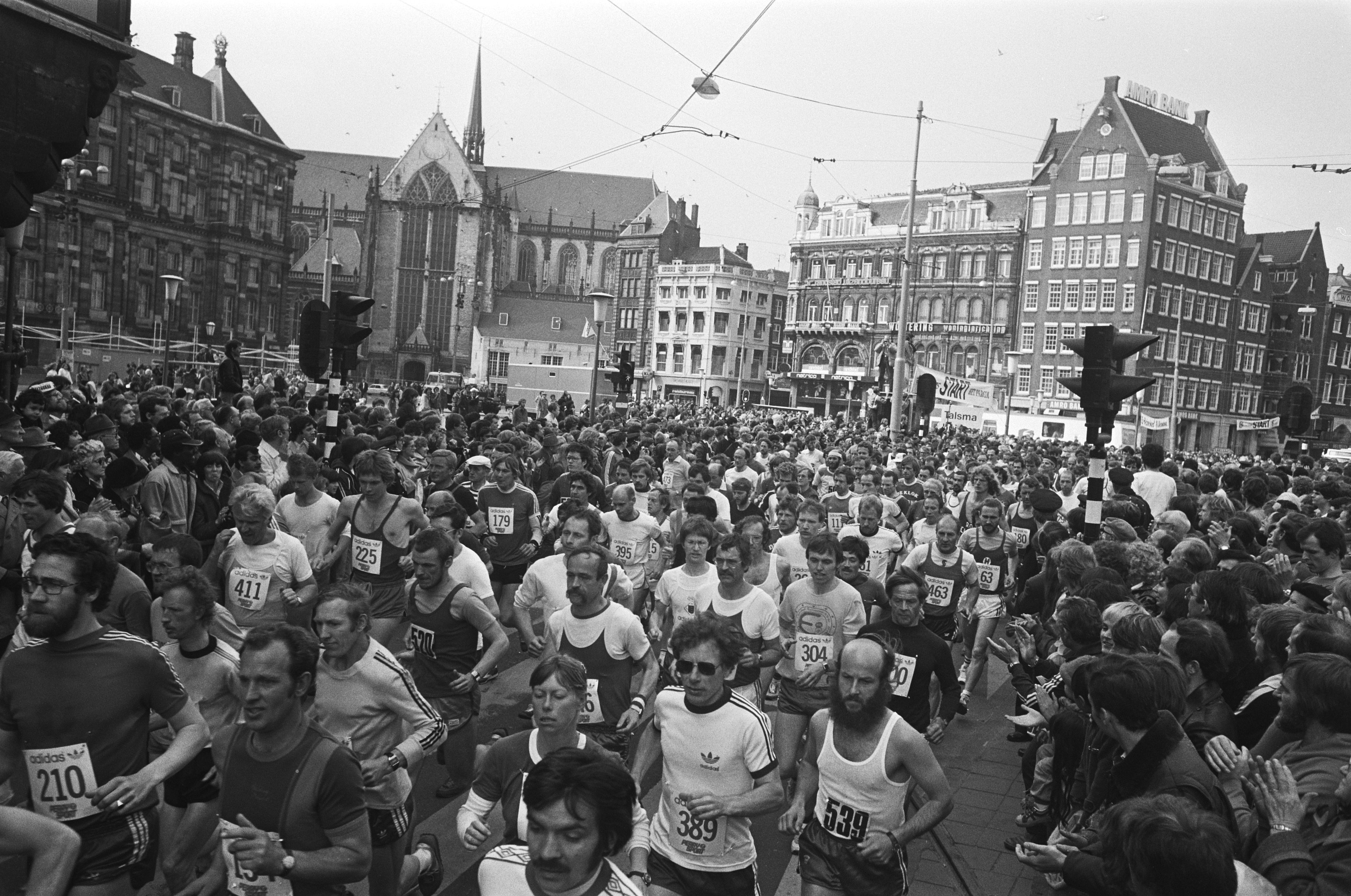
Start of the marathon on Dam Square in 1980

The 1980 course record of 2:09:01 run by Dutchman Gerard Nijboer could be considered an unofficial world record as the generally recognized record at that time, 2:08:34 in Antwerp, had been run on a course that was 500 meters short. However, IAAF doesn't recognise Nijboer's time as any record.

The same year, Dutchwoman Marja Wokke had her first victory and set a new women's course record of 2:40:15.

Wokke's second victory came the next year and also Szekeres had his second victory in Amsterdam in 1981.

In 1982, Annie van Stiphout improved the women's course record with more than five minutes to 2:37:28.

Cor Vriend won the marathon twice in 1982 and 1983.

Nijboer won the race again in 1984, 1988, and 1989, making him the runner with the most victories in this marathon.

=== 1990–1999 ===
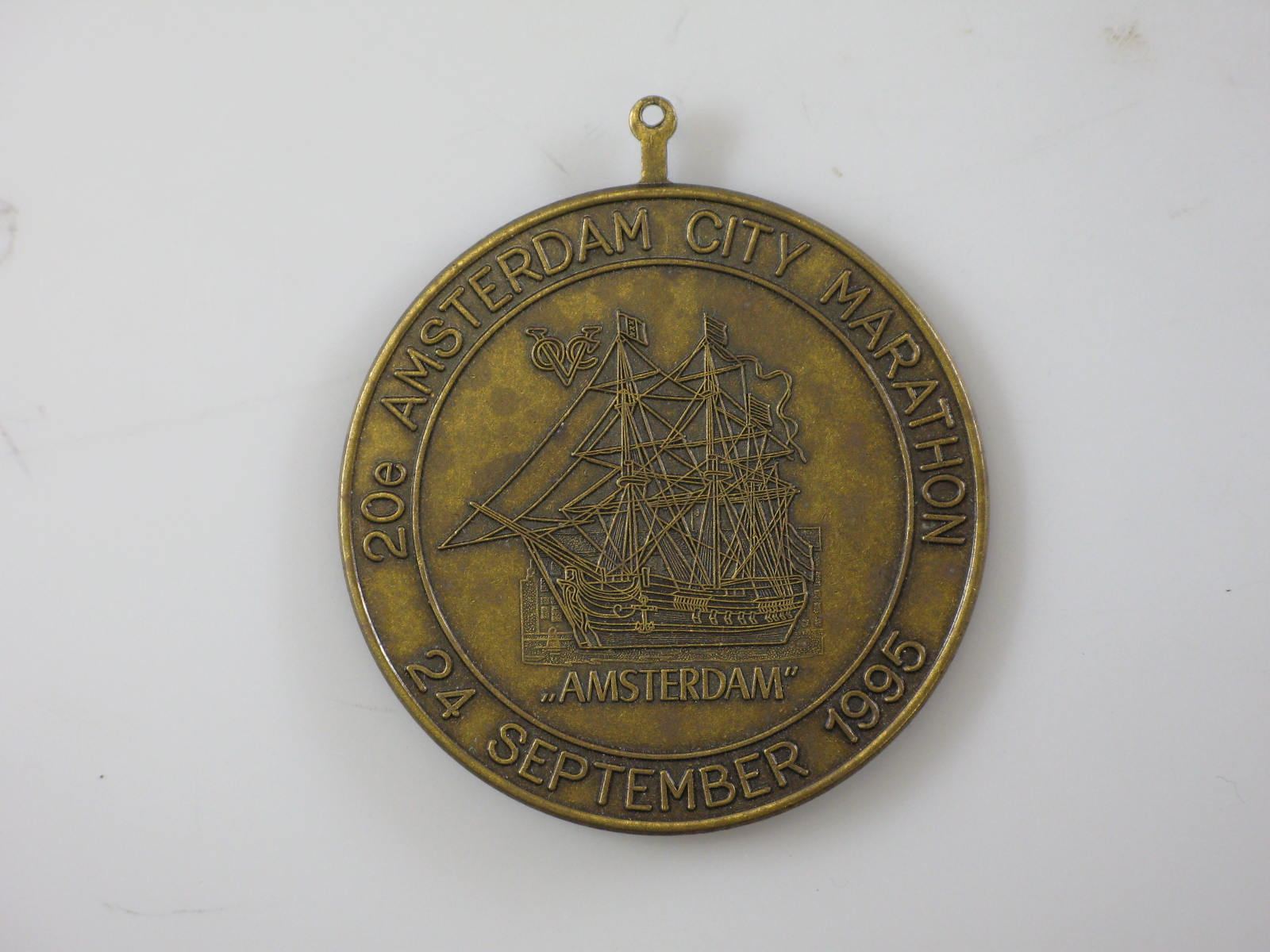
Participation medal of the Amsterdam Marathon in 1995

In 1990, Renata Kokowska won the women's race in a course record of 2:35:31.

Yoshiko Yamamoto improved the women's course record to 2:29:12 in 1993.

Sammy Korir won twice in 1997 and 1998, improving the men's course record to 2:08:24 and 2:08:13. In 1998, Catherina McKiernan set a women's course record of 2:22:23 as well.

The next year, Fred Kiprop finishing in another men's course record of 2:06:47.

=== 2000–2009 ===
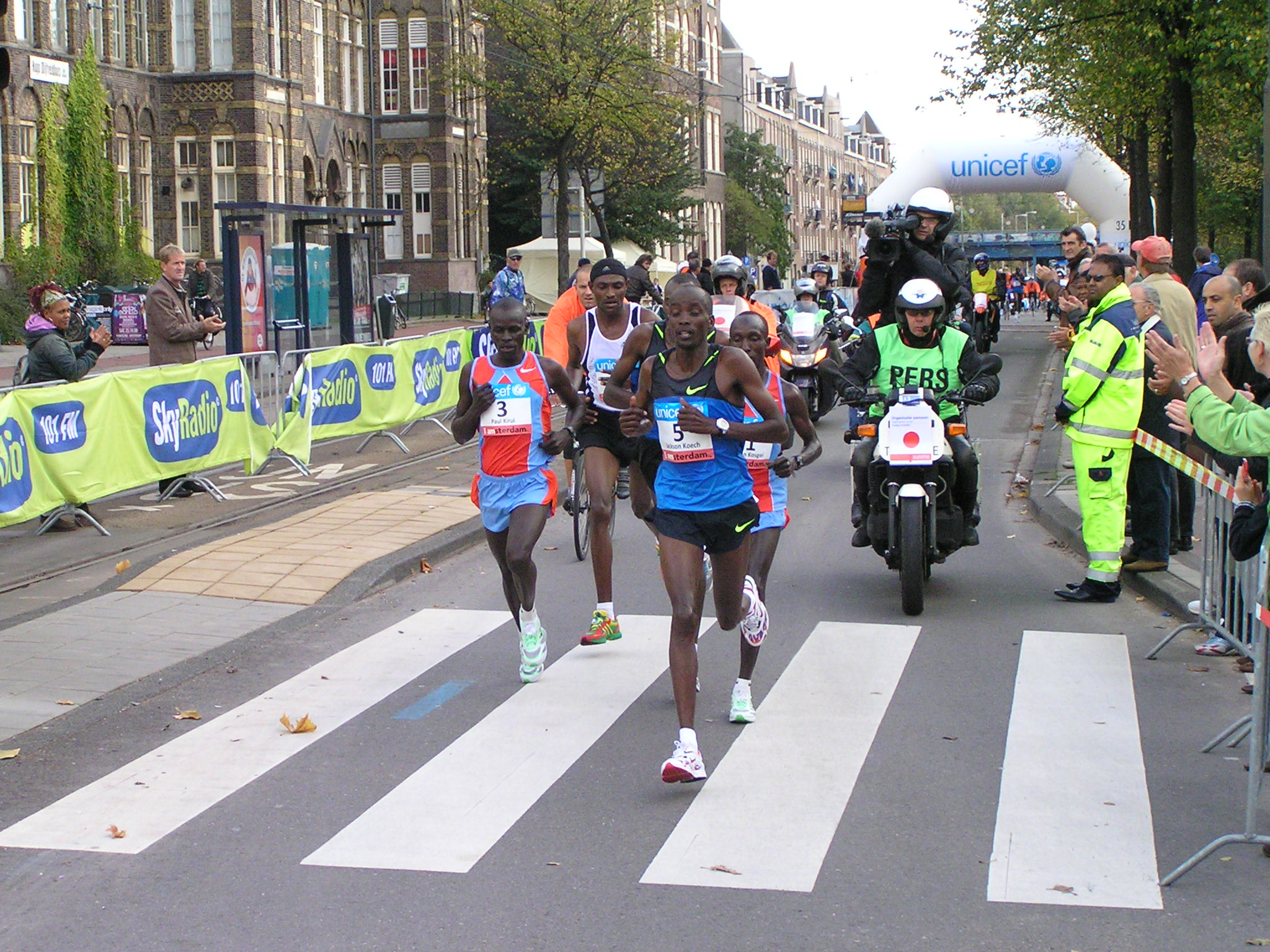
Leading group of the 2008 men's race with winner Paul Kirui on the left

In 2002, Gete Wami set a new women's course record of 2:22:19. Fifth place finisher Alina Gherasim tested positive for anabolic steroids in the same year and received a two-year doping ban.

In 2005, the former world record holder on the marathon, Haile Gebrselassie, earned his first win in the Amsterdam Marathon in the fastest marathon time in the world for the 2006 season (2:06.20).

=== 2010–2019 ===
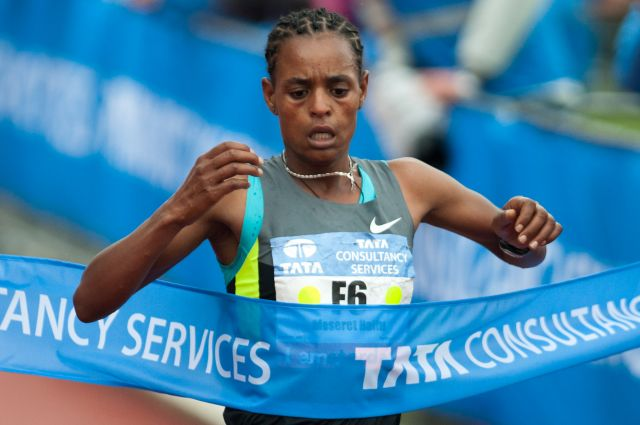
Meseret Hailu winning the 2012 women's race in new course record

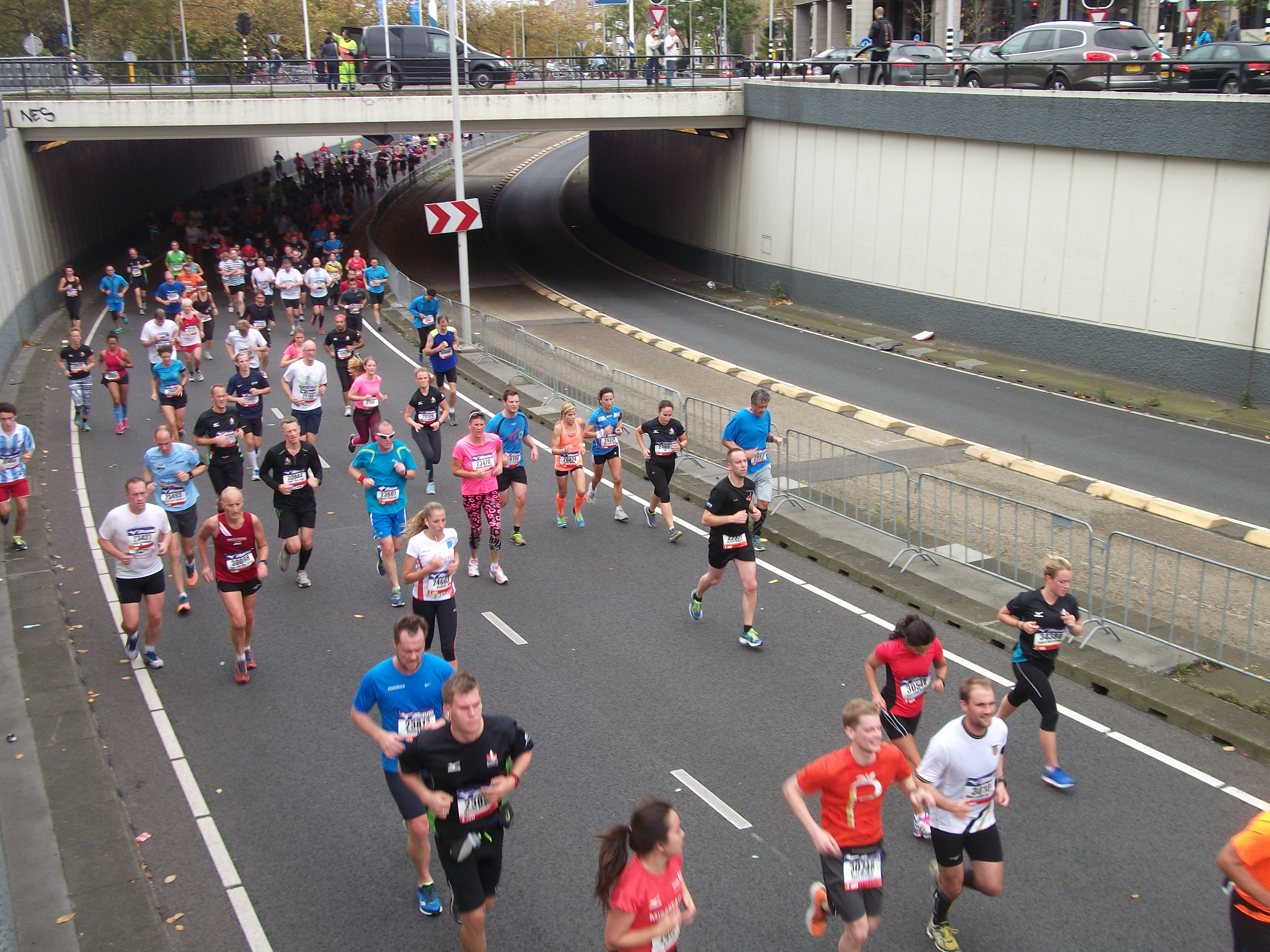
Amsterdam Marathon 2014

In 2010, Getu Feleke finished in 2:05:44 and improved the men's course record from 2009 by 34 seconds. The next year, Tiki Gelana improved the women's course record to 2:22:08.

In 2012, the Kenyan Wilson Chebet won the race by a time of 2:05:41 and broke the previous course record by three seconds. In the same year, Ethiopian Meseret Hailu broke the women's course record with a time of 2:21:09. Having also won in 2011, Chebet went on to win the race for a third time in 2013.

In 2017, Kenya’s Lawrence Cherono was the surprise winner of the TCS Amsterdam Marathon, taking more than a minute off his PB to set a new course record of 2:05:09. He went on to defend his title in 2018 and set a new course record of 2:04:06.

=== 2020–present ===
The 2020 in-person edition of the race was cancelled due to the coronavirus pandemic, with all entries automatically transferred to 2021, and all registrants given the option of transferring their entry to another runner.

In the 2021 edition, both Tamirat Tola and Angela Tanui set a course records of 2:03:38 in the men's race and 2:17:57 in the women's race respectively.

Almaz Ayana set a new women's course record of 2:17:20 in 2022.

The women's course record was broken by Yalemzerf Yehualaw in a time of 2:16:52 in 2024.

In 2025 was the 50th anniversary edition of the Amsterdam marathon . It was won by Kenyan Geoffrey Toroitich in a new course record of 2:03:31.

== Course records ==
Men's course record progression
Date	Athlete	Time	Ref.
3 May 1975	(Denmark) Jørgen Jensen	2:16:51	
21 May 1977	(United States) Bill Rodgers	2:12:47	
26 April 1980	(Netherlands) Gerard Nijboer	2:09:01	
2 November 1997	(Kenya) Sammy Korir	2:08:24	
1 November 1998	(Kenya) Sammy Korir	2:08:13	
17 October 1999	(Kenya) Fred Kiprop	2:06:47	
19 October 2003	(Kenya) William Kipsang	2:06:39	
17 October 2004	(Kenya) Robert Cheboror	2:06:22	
16 October 2005	(Ethiopia) Haile Gebrselassie	2:06:20	
18 October 2009	(Kenya) Gilbert Yegon	2:06:18	
17 October 2010	(Ethiopia) Getu Feleke	2:05:44	
21 October 2012	(Kenya) Wilson Chebet	2:05:41	
20 October 2013	(Kenya) Wilson Chebet	2:05:36	
16 October 2016	(Kenya) Daniel Wanjiru	2:05:21	
17 October 2017	(Kenya) Lawrence Cherono	2:05:09	
21 October 2018	(Kenya) Lawrence Cherono	2:04:06	
17 October 2021	(Ethiopia) Tamirat Tola	2:03:38	
19 October 2025	(Kenya) Geoffrey Toroitich Kipchumba	2:03:31	
18 October 2026	(Ethiopia) Lemi Berhanu	2:03:33	

Women's course record progression
Date	Athlete	Time	Ref.
3 May 1975	(Netherlands) Plonie Scheringa	3:13:38	
26 April 1980	(Netherlands) Marja Wokke	2:40:15	
8 May 1982	(Netherlands) Annie van Stiphout	2:37:28	
10 May 1987	(Romania) Adriana Barbu	2:36:21	
13 May 1990	(Poland) Renata Kokowska	2:35:31	
26 September 1993	(Japan) Yoshiko Yamamoto	2:29:12	
1 November 1998	(Republic of Ireland) Catherina McKiernan	2:22:23	
20 October 2002	(Ethiopia) Gete Wami	2:22:19	
16 October 2011	(Ethiopia) Tiki Gelana	2:22:08	
21 October 2012	(Ethiopia) Meseret Hailu	2:21:09	
20 October 2019	(Ethiopia) Degitu Azimeraw	2:19:26	
17 October 2021	(Kenya) Angela Tanui	2:17:57	
16 October 2022	(Ethiopia) Almaz Ayana	2:17:20	
20 October 2024	(Ethiopia) Yalemzerf Yehualaw	2:16:52	
19 October 2025	(Ethiopia) Aynalem Desta	2:17:37	
18 October 2026	(Ethiopia) Buze Diriba	2:16:12	

== Route ==
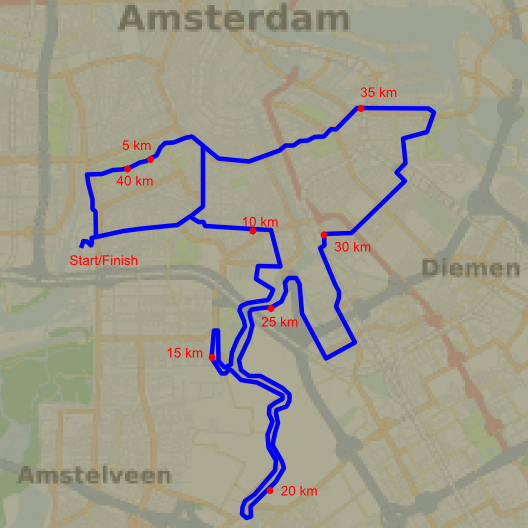
Route of the marathon in 2007

The route starts and finishes in the Olympic Stadium. The course is flat, with a maximum elevation of 33 ft (10 m) at the 23-mile (37-km) mark.
