= Gilbert Yegon =

Kenyan long-distance runner (born 1988)

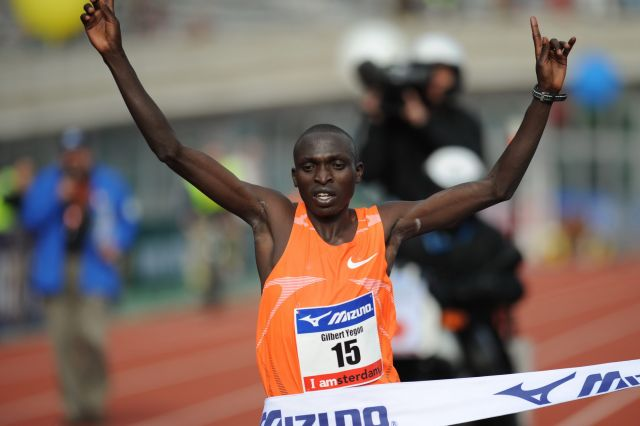
Yegon celebrating victory at the 2009 Amsterdam Marathon

Gilbert Yegon (born 26 January 1988) is a Kenyan long-distance runner who competes in marathon races.

He began taking part in road races in 2008, and he ran a time of 1:02:43 at the Nairobi Half Marathon securing third place. He entered the Berlin Half Marathon the following year and improved his time to 1:01:26, finishing in twelfth place. In September 2009, he ran at the Rotterdam Half Marathon but was three minutes behind the winner Sammy Kitwara, having run 1:02:00 for fourteenth place. He stepped up to make his marathon debut at the 2009 Amsterdam Marathon and scored his first major victory. In one of the fastest ever debuts, he ran a time of 2:06:18 to break Haile Gebrselassie's four-year-old course record.

He ran at the 20 van Alphen in March 2010 and finished in third place, behind Bernard Chepkok and Dejene Yirdaw, but recorded a 20 km best time of 58:56. He came 22nd at the 2010 Boston Marathon and fared better at the 2010 Berlin Marathon, taking eighth place in 2:10:34 hours. He did not compete in 2011 but returned to competition at the 2012 Vienna Marathon with a runner-up performance in 2:07:38 hours.

== Achievements ==
- All results regarding marathon, unless stated otherwise

Year	Competition	Venue	Position	Notes
Representing Kenya
2009	Amsterdam Marathon	Amsterdam, Netherlands	1st	2:06:18
2010	Boston Marathon	Boston, United States	22nd	2:21:12
2012	Vienna Marathon	Vienna, Austria	2nd	2:07:38

== Personal bests ==
Event	Time (h:m:s)	Venue	Date
10 km	28:18	Rotterdam, Netherlands	13 September 2009
20 km	58:56	Alphen aan den Rijn, Netherlands	7 March 2010
Half marathon	1:01:26	Berlin, Germany	5 April 2009
Marathon	2:06:18	Amsterdam, Netherlands	18 October 2009

- All information taken from IAAF profile.

== Competition record ==
- 2008 Nairobi Half Marathon – 3rd
