= Málaga City Hall =

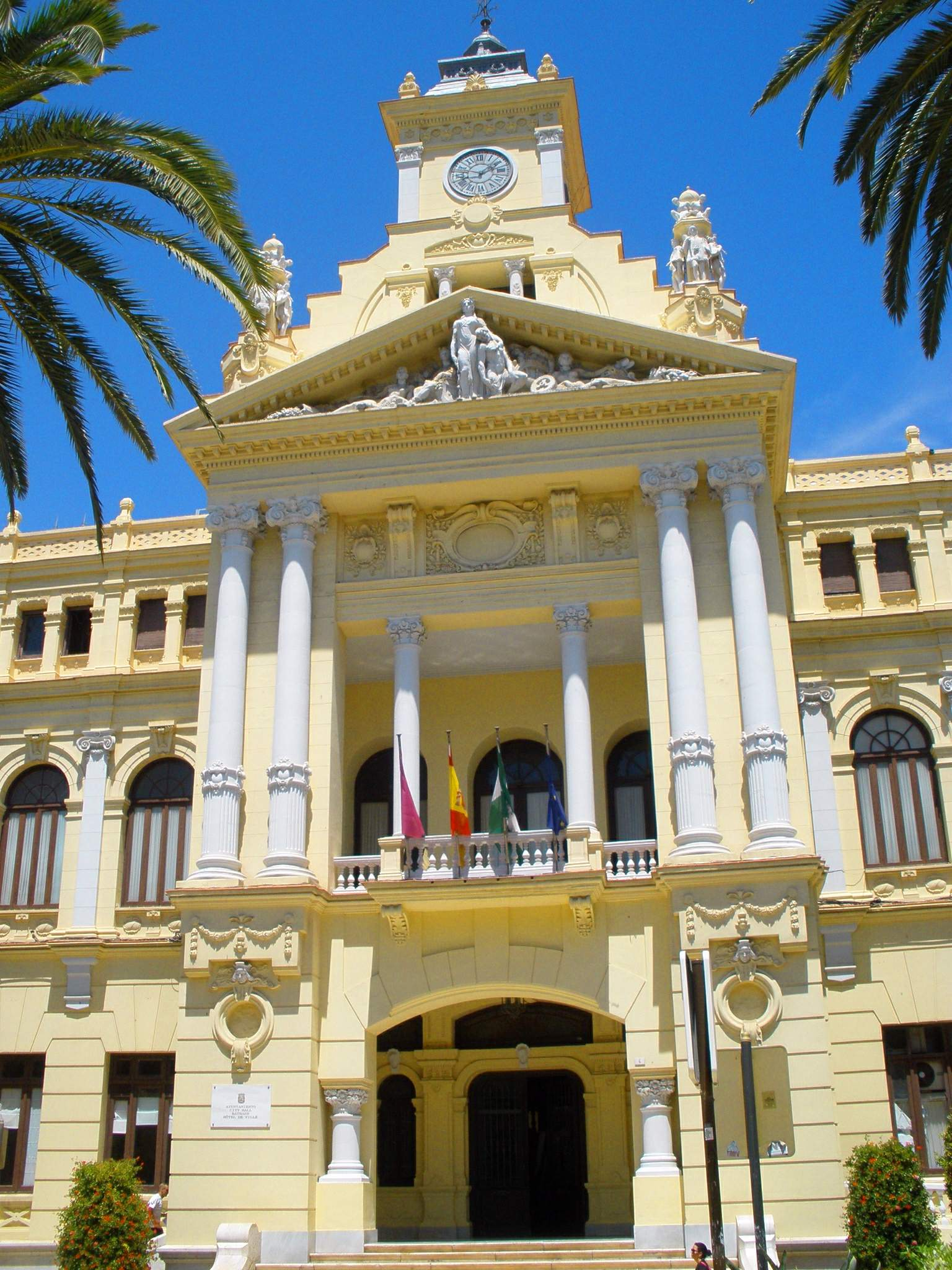

Málaga City Hall (Spanish: Casa consistorial de Málaga), also known as La Casona del Parque (literally, "The Mansion in the Park"), is the seat of the city council of Málaga, Spain.

A Baroque Revival building with modernist elements, it was designed by the architects Fernando Guerrero Strachan and Manuel Rivera Vera. The first stone was laid by mayor Ricardo Albert on the last day of 1911, and the building was inaugurated on 11 April 1919 by mayor Manuel Romero Raggio. The cost was 1.5 million Spanish pesetas. The Real Academia de Bellas Artes de San Telmo was an advisor for the project, and the building was initially also going to hold the Provincial Deputation of Málaga and the Court of Investigation.

The city council had previously been seated in several sites around the city, the first being a former mosque in December 1488, shortly after the Catholic Monarchs took the city in the Reconquista. In the following century, it moved to the Plaza de las Cuatro Calles (now Plaza de la Constitución), remaining there until demolition in the 1860s. After that, it rented several historic buildings in the city centre, moving frequently due to problems with paying the bills.

In January 2010, the City Hall was declared a Bien de Interés Cultural. The designation also covers the Jardines de Pedro Luis Alonso, gardens behind the building.

In December 2021, refurbishment plans were announced to make the building more akin to its initial design. These would remove landings and the third floor, thereby making each storey higher.
