= Málaga Half Marathon =

Annual race in Spain since 1991

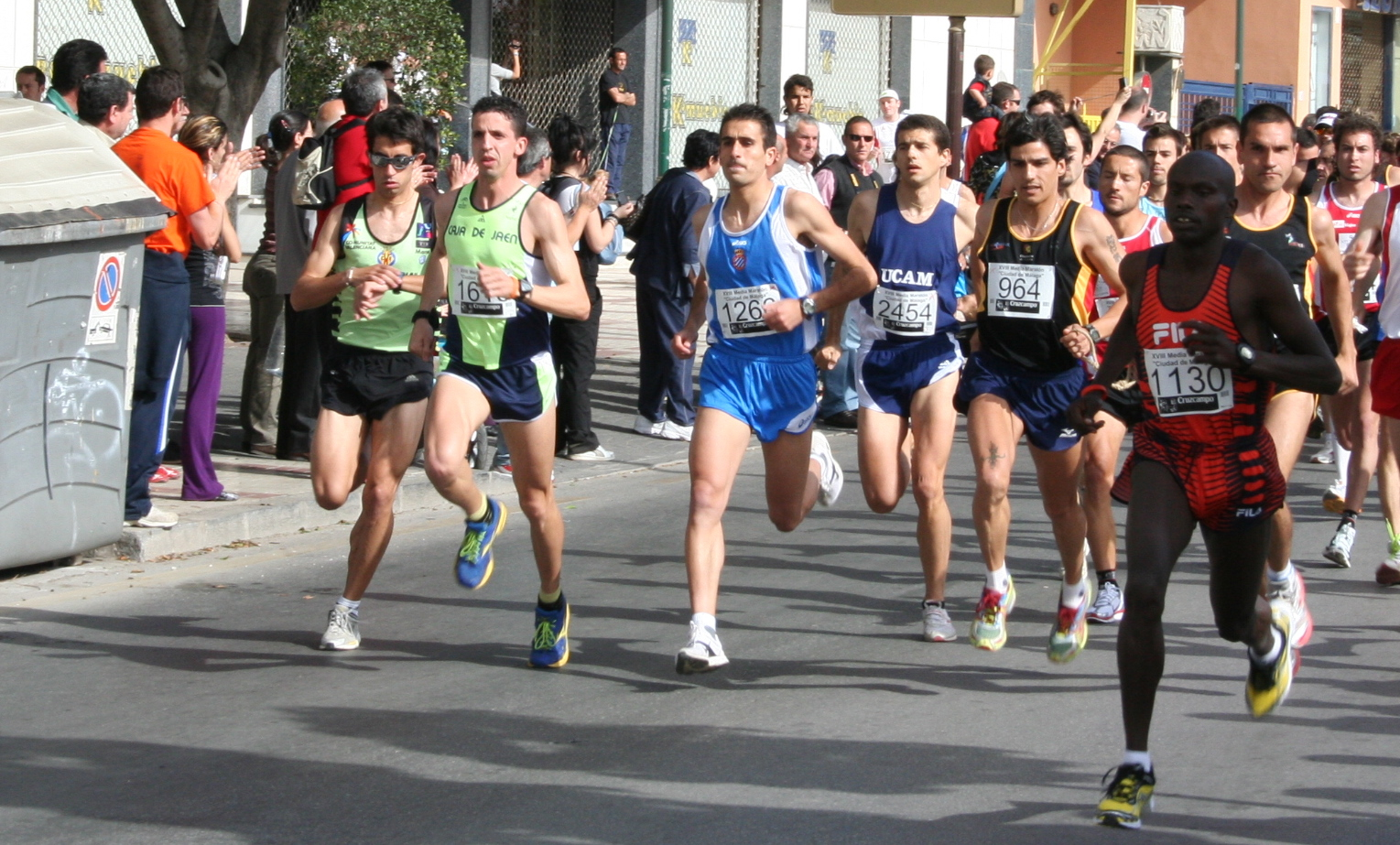
- Kenyan runner Clement Koech (with bib number 1130), the eventual winner of the 2008 race, running with the lead pack at the race's start
- Date: March
- Location: Málaga, Andalusia, Spain
- Event type: Road
- Distance: Half marathon
- Established: 1991 (35 years ago)
- Website: www.mediamaratonmalaga.com

The Málaga Half Marathon (Spanish: Media Maratón de Málaga or Media Maratón Ciudad de Málaga (Note: In Spanish, the race has also been spelt "Medio Maratón de Málaga" or "Medio Maratón Ciudad de Málaga", and has also been stylized "1/2 Maratón de Málaga". For sponsorship reasons, the race is also known as the "TotalEnergies Málaga Half Marathon".)) is an annual road-based half marathon hosted by Málaga, Spain, since 1991. The marathon is a World Athletics Label Road Race.

A different half marathon race, called the "Generali Málaga Half Marathon" by its organizers, is held concurrently with the Malaga Marathon, which is generally scheduled later in the year.

== History ==
The inaugural event was held on 2 June 1991. A total of 312 people took part in the half marathon, which was won by Portuguese runner Fernando Fernández and Spanish runner Carmen Mingorance, with finish times of 1:03:25 and 1:16:17, respectively.

The 30th edition of the race, originally scheduled for 22 March 2020, was postponed to 7 November 2021 due to the coronavirus pandemic. The race was held in November again for 2022, and then in October for 2023, before it was moved back to March for 2024.

== Course ==
External images
- Course map of half marathon in 2021
- Course map of half marathon in 2024

The half marathon is held on a largely out-and-back course that runs near the coastline in a northeasterly direction before following it back southwest. There is a short out-and-back leg between the 7 and 10 km (4 and 6 mi) marks where the course dips south to run on the peninsula where the Málaga Lighthouse sits. The course begins just south of the Estadio Ciudad de Málaga and finishes inside the stadium.
