= Bogotá Half Marathon =

Road running competition

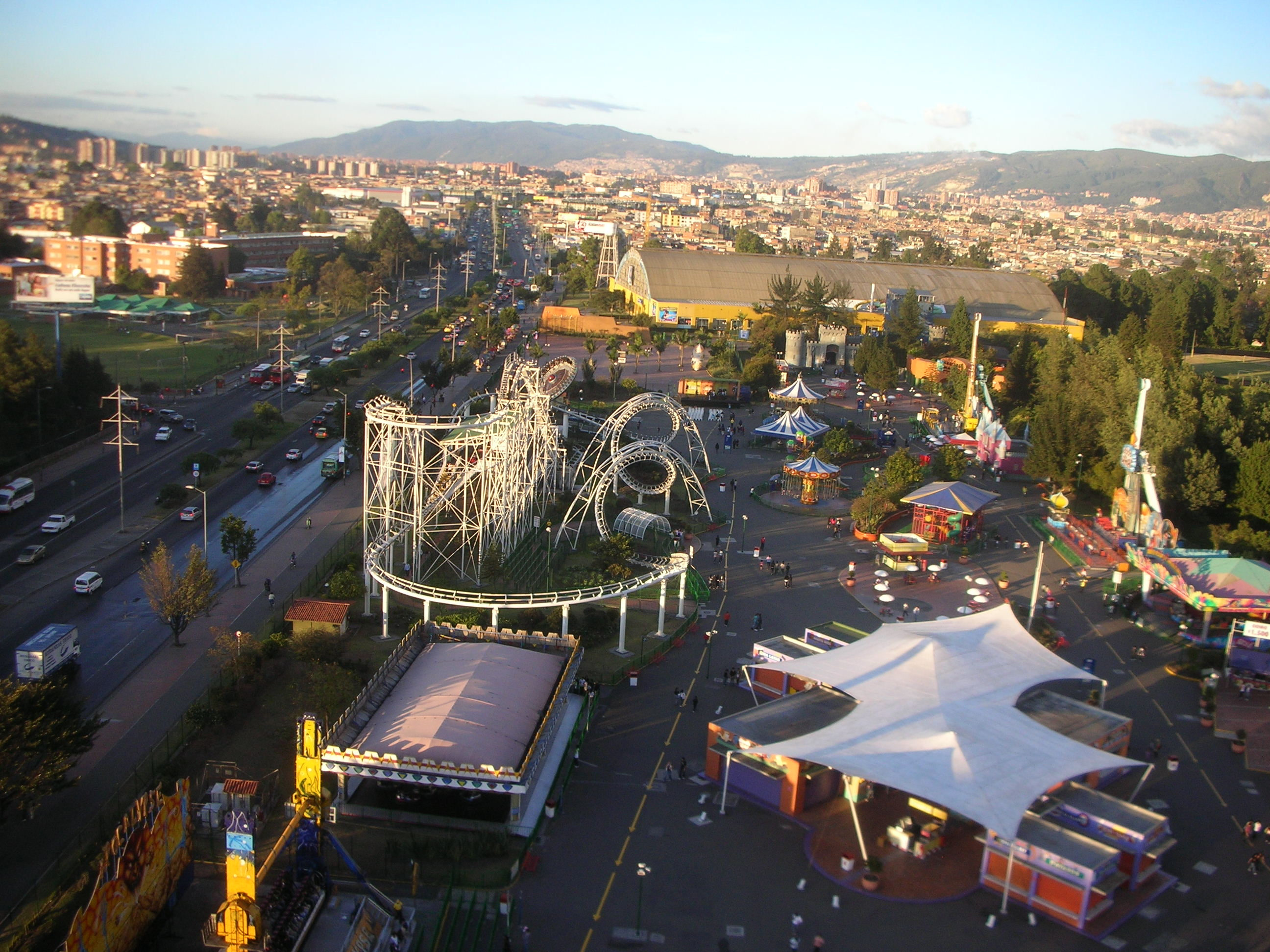
- Part of the last kilometre of the half marathon as seen from a Ferris Wheel in Salitre Mágico
- Date: Late July/Early August
- Location: Bogotá, Colombia
- Event type: Road
- Distance: Half marathon
- Established: 2000
- Course records: Men's: 1:02:20 (2011) (Kenya) Geoffrey Mutai; Women's: 1:10:29 (2003) (Kenya) Susan Chepkemei
- Website: Official website

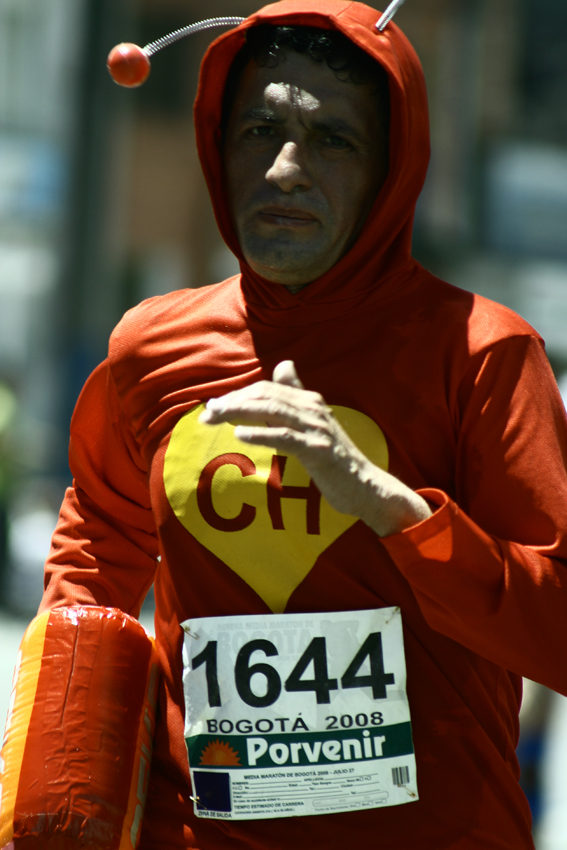
A runner in costume in 2008

The Bogotá International Half Marathon (Spanish: Media Maratón Internacional de Bogotá), or mmB as it is traditionally known, is an annual road running competition over a half marathon distance (21.0975 km (13.1 mi)) taking place in Bogotá, Colombia in late July or early August, first held in 2000. The competition features both elite and popular (or recreational) sections within the half marathon and 10K races. Around 45,000 runners take part in the competition's events each year.

Both the half marathon and the 10K start and finish in Simón Bolívar Park. The race is not considered a fast one, as the city is located around 2,600 m (8,500 ft) above sea level.

The half marathon holds World Athletics Platinum Label Road Race status, making it the first and currently only South American race to achieve this accreditation.

== History ==
The first race was held in 2000.

The race has featured a number of high-profile runners, including former marathon world record holder and champion Catherine Ndereba, two-time Saint Silvester Road Race winner James Kwambai, Olympic medallist and New York City Marathon champion Joyce Chepchumba and 2005 World Half Marathon champion Fabiano Joseph.

The 2020 edition of the race was postponed to 2021.07.25 due to the coronavirus pandemic.

== Course ==
In 2010, both the half marathon and the 10K had a point-to-point format. The half marathon course started at Bolívar Square and headed north past Avenida Jiménez and Parque Nacional, before turning west at Unicentro shopping centre. The course continued heading west, passing the Salitre Mágico amusement park, and finished at Simón Bolívar Park. The 10K race had identical start and finishing points, but followed a more direct path between the two – heading north on Calle 26 then switching to Calle 53 which goes directly past Bolívar Park.

By 2013, the courses for both races had changed so that they both started and ended at Simón Bolívar Park.

For 2021, the half marathon course was set to begin around the Events Plaza of Simón Bolívar Park, head southeast to Torre Colpatria, and head north past Parque Nacional up to around Parque El Virrey, before heading back to Simón Bolívar Park for the finish.

The race is not typically conducive to fast times as the city is located at 2,600m above sea level, some 8,530ft, a factor which inhibits long distance runners. However, it is considered a perfect training ground for professional athletes and runners looking to run the World's Marathon Majors in Berlin, Chicago and New York happening in the fall of each year.

== Winners ==
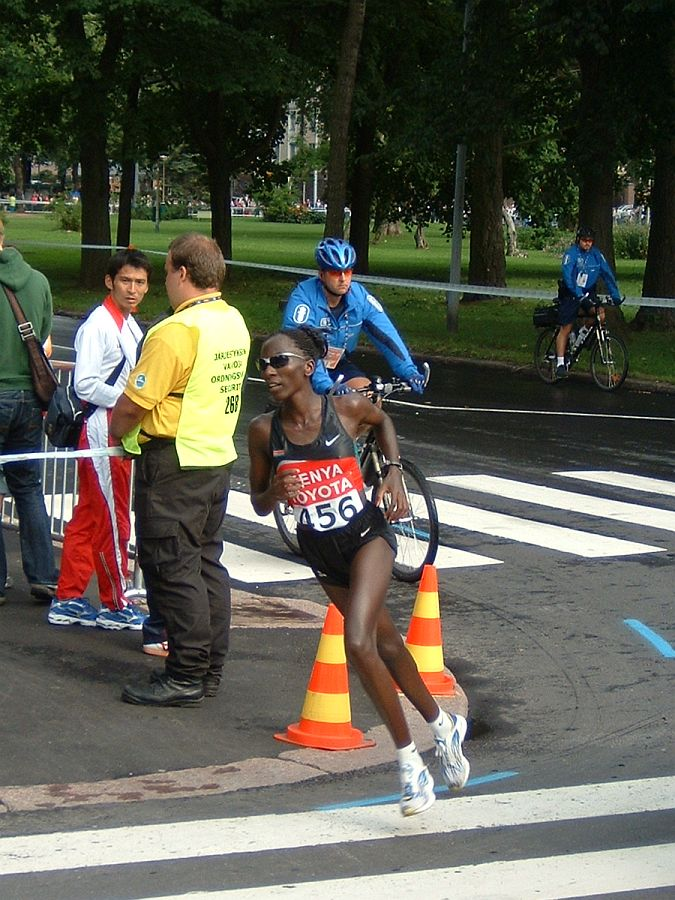
Catherine Ndereba (pictured here in Helsinki) won the 2006 women's race.

Key: Course record

Ed.	Year	Men's winner	Time	Women's winner	Time
1	2000	Armando Quintanilla (MEX)	1:04:20	Martha Tenorio (ECU)	1:12:07
2	2001	Juan José Castillo (PER)	1:03:51	María Portillo (PER)	1:15:04
3	2002	Ben Kimondiu (KEN)	1:04:39	Teresa Wanjiku (KEN)	1:15:17
4	2003	José Alirio Carrasco (COL)	1:04:23	Susan Chepkemei (KEN)	1:10:29
5	2004	Isaac Macharia (KEN)	1:04:03	Joyce Chepchumba (KEN)	1:15:07
6	2005	James Kwambai (KEN)	1:03:10	Adriana Fernández (MEX)	1:15:02
7	2006	Fabiano Joseph (TAN)	1:02:34	Catherine Ndereba (KEN)	1:12:56
8	2007	Isaac Macharia (KEN)	1:03:40	Nouriah Asiba (KEN)	1:16:09
9	2008	Isaac Macharia (KEN)	1:03:34	Pamela Chepchumba (KEN)	1:12:55
10	2009	Isaac Macharia (KEN)	1:02:49	Lydia Cheromei (KEN)	1:12:29
11	2010	Deriba Merga (ETH)	1:02:31	Shewarge Amare (ETH)	1:13:54
12	2011	Geoffrey Mutai (KEN)	1:02:20	Joyce Chepkirui (KEN)	1:13:34
13	2012	Peter Kirui (KEN)	1:02:26	Gladys Cherono (KEN)	1:13:27
14	2013	Geoffrey Kamworor (KEN)	1:03:46	Priscah Jeptoo (KEN)	1:12:24
15	2014	Geoffrey Kamworor (KEN)	1:03:18	Rita Jeptoo (KEN)	1:13:39
16	2015	Stanley Biwott (KEN)	1:03:15	Amane Gobena (ETH)	1:13:44
17	2016	Tadese Tola (ETH)	1:05:16	Purity Cherotich (KEN)	1:11:56
18	2017	Feyisa Lilesa (ETH)	1:04:30	Brigid Kosgei (KEN)	1:12:16
19	2018	Betesfa Getahun (ETH)	1:05:10	Netsanet Gudeta (ETH)	1:11:34
20	2019	Tamirat Tola (ETH)	1:02:35	Ruth Chepng'etich (KEN)	1:10:39
	2020	Postponed due to the COVID-19 pandemic.			
21	2021	Held as an individual event due to the COVID-19 pandemic. No official winner.			
22	2022	Edwin Soi (KEN)	1:05:27	Angela Tanui (KEN)	1:13:29
23	2023	Omar Ait Chitachen (MAR)	1:03:50	Daisy Kimeli (KEN)	1:15:12
24	2024	Ezra Tanui (KEN)	1:03:05	Gladys Kwamboka (KEN)	1:14:00
