= Kosgei =

Kosgei, also written Kosgey and Koskei, is a surname of Kenyan origin that may refer to:

== Politicians ==
- Felix Koskei (born 1964), Kenyan politician and Cabinet Secretary for Agriculture, Livestock and Fisheries
- Henry Kosgey (born 1947), Kenyan politician and Chairman of the Orange Democratic Movement
- Sally Kosgei, Kenyan politician and National Assembly Member for the Orange Democratic Movement

== Runners ==
- Abraham Kosgei Chebii (born 1979), Kenyan long-distance runner and World Cross Country medallist
- Anne Kosgei (born 1980), Kenyan marathon runner and Venice Marathon winner
- Benjamin Kimutai Koskei (born 1971), Kenyan marathon runner and 2002 Amsterdam Marathon winner
- Brigid Kosgei (born 1994), Kenyan long-distance runner and 2019 London Marathon winner
- Christopher Koskei (born 1974), Kenyan steeplechase runner and 1999 world champion
- Elijah Kosgei (born 1986), Kenyan 800 metres runner competing for Qatar as Majed Saeed Sultan
- Hosea Kosgei (born 1989), Kenyan long-distance track runner competing for Bahrain as Aadam Ismaeel Khamis
- Irene Jerotich Kosgei (born 1974), Kenyan marathon runner and 2010 Commonwealth Games champion
- James Koskei (born 1968), Kenyan road runner competing mainly in American races
- Japhet Kosgei (born 1968), Kenyan marathon runner and 2000 Tokyo Marathon winner
- John Kosgei (born 1973), Kenyan steeplechase runner and 1998 Commonwealth Games champion
- Jonathan Kosgei Kipkorir (born 1982), Kenyan marathon runner and two-time Venice Marathon winner
- Joseph Kosgei (born 1974), Kenyan cross country runner
- Mark Kosgey Kiptoo (born 1976), Kenyan long-distance track runner and 2012 African champion
- Michael Kosgei Rotich (born 1982), Kenyan marathon runner and 1992 Paris Marathon winner
- Paul Malakwen Kosgei (born 1978), Kenyan long-distance runner and 2002 world champion in the half marathon
- Reuben Kosgei (born 1979), Kenyan steeplechase runner and 2000 Olympic champion
- Rose Kosgei (born 1981), Kenyan road runner
- Salina Kosgei (born 1976), Kenyan marathon runner and 2009 Boston Marathon winner
- Sammy Koskei (born 1961), Kenyan 800 metres runner and 1984 African champion
- Samuel Kiplimo Kosgei (born 1986), Kenyan road runner and former 25K world record holder
- Shadrack Kosgei (born 1984), Kenyan cross country runner
- Stephen Kosgei Kibet (born 1986), Kenyan half marathon runner
- Vincent Kiplangat Kosgei (born 1985), Kenyan Olympic 400 metres hurdler
- Wilson Kosgei Kipketer (born 1972), Kenyan 800 metres runner and three-time world champion for Denmark

== Activist ==
- Ian Kosgei Misigo (born 1995), Social justice activist

== See also ==
- Kipkosgei, a masculine name.

*Kosgei, means son of Kipkosgei

- Chepkosgei, is a feminine name.
- Mohammed Al-Salhi (born 1986), Kenyan 800 metres runner competing for Saudi Arabia whose former name was Kosgei
