= Hellen Mugo =

Kenyan long-distance runner

Hellen Wanjiku Mugo (born 12 December 1985) is a Kenyan long-distance runner who competes in marathon races. She has won marathons in Belgrade, Carpi, Mombasa and Košice. Her personal best is 2:27:16 hours, set in Carpi.

Born in Nyeri in Kenya, she did not immediately enter professional running as she married Ruben Mwaura and had a daughter, Anne Muthoni, in 2006. Mugo was runner-up to Philes Ongori at the Kenyan Armed Forces half marathon at the start of 2009 and from there she began to focus on longer distance. Her first European outing in the marathon saw her take a comfortable win at the Belgrade Marathon some twelve minutes ahead of the opposition. She came third at the Mombasa Marathon. In her third outing of the year, she knocked over ten minutes off her best time to win the Italian Marathon in Carpi with a run of 2:27:16 hours. Mugo was confident in her abilities and said, "I think that I can run 2:25 with the help of pacemakers."

In her first race of 2011 she started quickly at the Dubai Marathon, reaching the halfway point in 1:12:54 but faded in the second half, ending up twelfth with 2:36:38 hours. She entered the 2011 Boston Marathon and finished 13th place with her run of 2:29:06. She had a decent showing at the Porto Half Marathon, coming fourth, but did less well at the Venice Marathon, ending up seventh and crossing the line after 2:50:59 hours.

Mugo had a more successful year in 2012. She was fifth at the Seoul International Marathon, won the Mombasa Marathon, and set a course record of 2:29:59 to win the Košice Peace Marathon. She ended the year with a sixth-place finish at the Honolulu Marathon.
