= Anne Kosgei =

Kenyan long-distance runner (born 1980)

Anne Jepkemboi Kosgei (born in 1980 in Uasin Gishu) is a Kenyan long-distance runner who specialises in road running, including the marathon. She has won her first marathon races in San Sebastián and Trieste, and went on to win both the Belgrade Marathon and Venice Marathon in 2009. She set her personal best of 2:27:46 at the latter competition.

== Career ==
Kosgei began racing professionally around 2000 and won her first major race in Europe that year with a course record at the Giro dei tre Monti in Imola, Italy. Her first victory over the classic distance came at the 2001 San Sebastian Marathon, where her time of 2:31:19 was the third fastest ever at the competition. She improved upon this time at the 2002 Venice Marathon with a run of 2:30:09 to take second place behind Anastasia Ndereba. She also set a personal best over the half marathon that year when she again finished behind Ndereba at the Turin Half Marathon with a time of 1:13:00. The following year she took third at the Rome City Marathon, fifth at the Vienna City Marathon and ran her fastest of the year (2:33:43) to take second place at the Maratona d'Italia in Carpi behind Jennifer Chesinon.

She did not race over the marathon distance in 2004, but she took her first win over shorter distances at the Gavà-Castelldefels Half Marathon and the Granollers Half Marathon. After a year out of competition, she returned in 2006 with a win at the Route du Vin Half Marathon in September, followed by a third-place finish at the Milan Marathon. In April 2007 she improved her half marathon best to 1:10:17 with a win in Vigo, Spain. and she took her second major win of the season at the Trieste Marathon with a time of 2:33:14. Kosgei was runner-up for a second time at the 2007 Venice Marathon behind Lenah Cheruiyot, but she broke two and a half hours for the first time, completing the distance in a time of 2:28:27.

In 2008, she finished in three marathons: she was fourth at the Hong Kong Marathon, twelfth at the Hamburg Marathon and runner-up for a second year running at the Venice Marathon, where she ran her year's best time of 2:32:21. She also ran at the Rock 'n' Roll San Jose Half Marathon in October, taking third place on the podium behind Yuri Kano and Azalech Masresha.

Kosgei reached a career peak in 2009 by winning two prominent marathon races in the season. First came the Belgrade Marathon where she beat World Military champion Rasa Drazdauskaite to the finish to take victory in a time of 2:34:51. In October she returned to the Venice Marathon and topped the podium for the first time. Seeing off a challenge from Jelena Yal Koren, Kosgei set a strong pace to lead the competition and went on win in a career best time of 2:27:46 for the marathon.

She entered the 2010 San Diego Marathon and finished in seventh place with a time of 2:33:36. Her next outing over the distance came at the Eindhoven Marathon and although Atsede Habtamu won the race five minutes ahead of her, Kosgei's time of 2:31:05 gained her third place some two minutes clear of the rest of the field.
