= Venice Marathon =

Annual race in Italy held since 18 May 1986

- The Venice Marathon Logo 2008
- Date: October
- Location: Venice, Italy
- Event type: Road
- Distance: Marathon
- Primary sponsor: Confindustria
- Established: 1986 (40 years ago)
- Course records: Men's: 2:07:31 (2026) (Kenya) Peter Kwemoi; Women's: 2:23:37 (2011) (Kenya) Helena Kirop
- Website: Venice Marathon
- Participants: 2,738 finishers (2021); 5,351 (2019); 4,912 (2018)

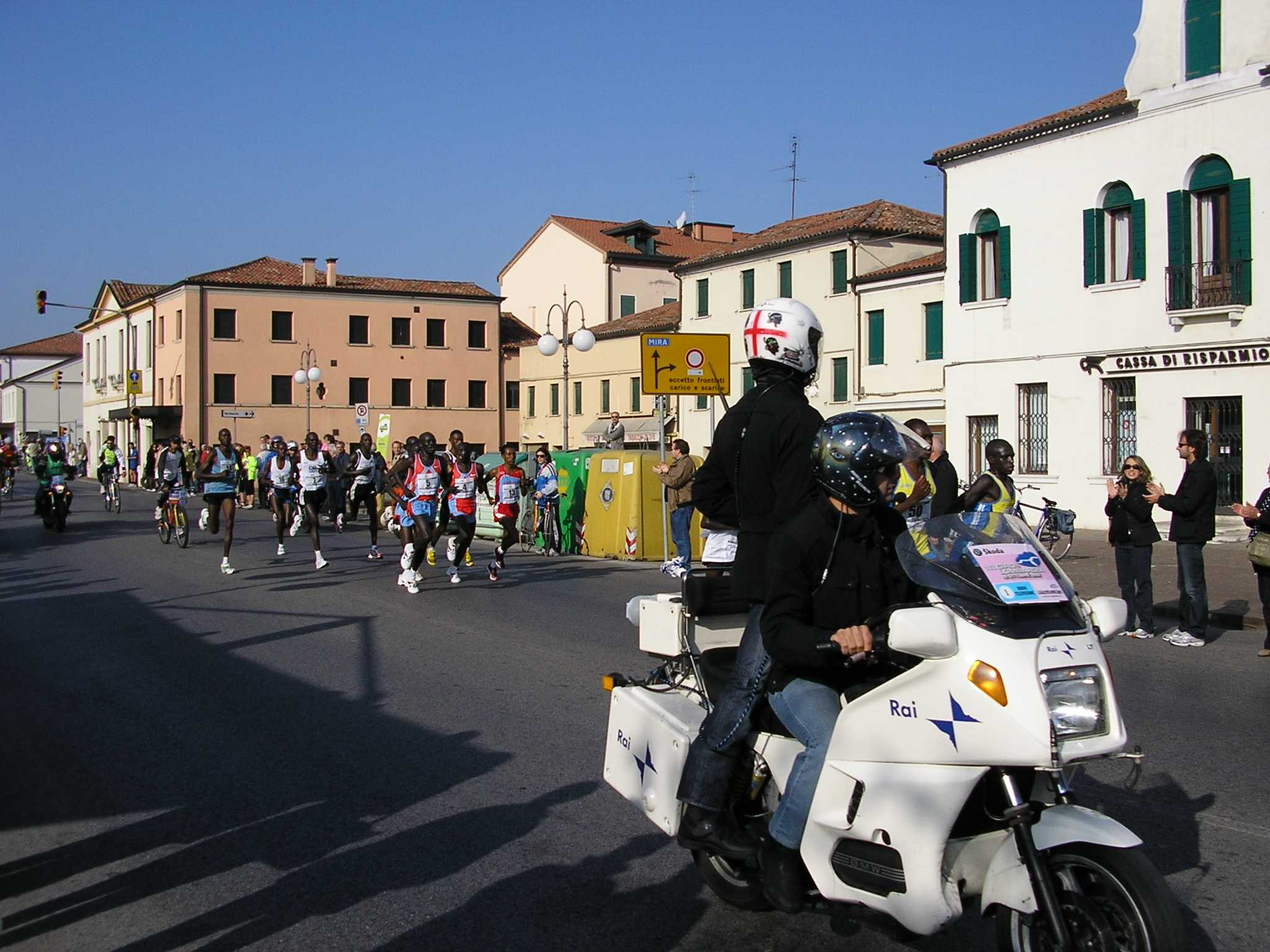
Venice Marathon during 2008

The Venice Marathon (stylized as Venicemarathon, Italian: Maratona di Venezia) is a marathon road race that has been held each year in Venice since 1986, usually in October. The course starts in Stra and passes through Mestre, Parco San Giuliano, and Ponte della Libertà before ending at Riva dei Sette Martiri in Venice. The marathon is categorized as a Bronze Label Road Race by World Athletics.

== History ==
The marathon was first held on 18 May 1986, with 713 athletes. The course began in Stra and ended at Campo Santi Apostoli in Cannaregio.

The race had previously been sponsored by Casino di Venezia (Venice Casino), and was known as the Casino di Venezia Venice Marathon at the time.

In 2010, the competition celebrated its 25th anniversary. That year it hosted the men's Italian marathon championships, which was won by Migidio Bourifa.

In 2011, the course included a section in Piazza San Marco for the first time.

In 2012, the organizers decided to reroute the course to bypass Piazza San Marco due to the high tide in Venice.

In 2017, the six leading runners lost about two minutes after mistakenly following a lead motorcycle for several hundred meters off the course about 25 km (16 mi) into the race. Race co-founder Enrico Jacomini explained that the lead vehicles had split off from the course as planned before it entered Venice, as it always does, since "Venice is not a city for cars or motorcycles". Local runner Eyob Ghebrehiwet Faniel ended up winning the race by roughly two minutes, becoming the first Italian to win the marathon in 22 years. (Note: Faniel mentioned "ha[ving] to run alone on the Ponte della Libertà" as a reason why it was not an easy win for him.)

In 2018, the high tide resulted in runners having to run through ankle-deep water, and forced organizers to drop Piazza San Marco from the course. Strong winds and heavy rain only exacerbated the conditions.

In 2020, due to the coronavirus pandemic, organizers restricted the number of participants to three: a female ultramarathon champion, a male runner on the Venicemarathon Running Team, and a Paralympic champion. All other registrants were automatically transferred to a virtual edition of the race, and given the option of transferring their entry to 2021 or 2022.

== Course ==
The marathon runs on a point-to-point course that begins at Villa Pisani in Stra along the Riviera del Brenta and ends on the Riva dei Sette Martiri in Venice.

The first part of the course roughly follows the river eastward through Fiesso d'Artico, Dolo, Mira Porte, Oriago, and Malcontenta, before splitting off to the northeast to arrive at Marghera for the halfway point.

The marathon next heads into Mestre, where it turns southeast to Parco San Giuliano, wandering inside the park for about 2 km (1.2 mi) before crossing Ponte della Libertà, a bridge nearly 4 km (2.5 mi) long that connects the Venetian islands to the mainland.

After leaving the bridge, the course heads toward the southern edge of the main island before running east along the Giudecca Canal and then crossing the Grand Canal at Punta della Dogana on a temporary pontoon bridge built specifically for the marathon. Runners then make a small loop in Piazza San Marco, as long as the high tide permits, (Note: The high tide in Venice may result in the course being rerouted, as was done in the 2018 edition of the race.) before continuing east along San Marco basin to finish at Riva dei Sette Martiri.

As the course runs over many small canals during the last few kilometers in Venice, wooden ramps are constructed over the small bridges to prevent runners from running on the bridge steps.

== Other races ==
A 10K (Note: The race is marketed as a 10K, but is actually about 10.7 km (6.6 mi) in length.) covering the last segment of the marathon, from when the course leaves Parco San Giuliano (shortly before crossing Ponte della Libertà) to when the course finishes at Riva dei Sette Martiri, is held on the same day as the marathon. There are also a series of family runs, all roughly 4 km (2.5 mi) in length, that take place during the weeks before the marathon.

== Winners ==
Peter Kwemoi of Kenya set the men's record of 2:07:31 in 2026, while Helena Kirop, also of Kenya, is the women's holder with 2:23:37, set in 2011.

Key: Course record

Year	Men's winner	Nationality	Time	Women's winner	Nationality	Time	Rf.
2026	Peter Kwemoi	Kenya	2:07:31	Jackline Jerono	Kenya	2:26:16	
2025	Deribe Robi	Ethiopia	2:08:58	Ashumar Zebenay	Ethiopia	2:27:31	
2024	Abebe Tilahun	Ethiopia	2:09:08	Birtukan Abera	Ethiopia	2:32:40	
2023	Solomon Mutai	Uganda	2:07:40	Rebbeca Tanui	Kenya	2:25:34	
2022	Solomon Mutai	Uganda	2:08:10	Lucy Karimi	Kenya	2:28:12	
2021	Anderson Seroi	Kenya	2:12:21	Sofiia Yaremchuk	Italy	2:29:12	
2020	Not held due to the COVID-19 pandemic.						
2019	Tesfaye Anbesa	Ethiopia	2:10:49	Judith Korir	Kenya	2:29:20	
2018	Mekuant Ayenew	Ethiopia	2:13:23	Angela Tanui	Kenya	2:31:30	
2017	Eyob Ghebrehiwet	Italy	2:12:16	Sule Utura	Ethiopia	2:29:04	
2016	Julius Rotich	Kenya	2:10:22	Priscah Cherono	Kenya	2:27:41	
2015	Julius Rotich	Kenya	2:11:08	Ehite Bizuayehu	Ethiopia	2:35:19	
2014	Behailu Mamo	Ethiopia	2:16:45	Konjit Tilahun	Ethiopia	2:40:20	
2013	Nixon Machichim	Kenya	2:13:10	Mercy Kibarus	Kenya	2:31:14	
2012	Philemon Kisang	Kenya	2:17:00	Emebt Etea	Ethiopia	2:38:10	
2011	Tadese Aredo	Ethiopia	2:09:13	Helena Kirop	Kenya	2:23:37	
2010	Simon Mukun	Kenya	2:09:35	Makda Harun	Ethiopia	2:28:08	
2009	John Komen	Kenya	2:08:13	Anne Kosgei	Kenya	2:27:46	
2008	Joseph Lomala	Kenya	2:11:06	Anikó Kálovics	Hungary	2:31:24	
2007	Jonathan Kosgei	Kenya	2:12:27	Lenah Cheruiyot	Kenya	2:27:02	
2006	Jonathan Kosgei	Kenya	2:10:18	Lenah Cheruiyot	Kenya	2:33:44	
2005	Mubarak Shami	Qatar	2:09:22	Emily Kimuria	Kenya	2:28:42	
2004	Raymond Kipkoech	Kenya	2:09:54	Jane Ekimat	Kenya	2:32:08	
2003	El Hassan Lahssini	France	2:11:01	Anne Jelagat	Kenya	2:30:17	
2002	David Makori	Kenya	2:08:49	Anastasia Ndereba	Kenya	2:29:03	
2001	Moges Taye	Ethiopia	2:10:08	Zahia Dahmani	France	2:33:32	
2000	John Bungei	Kenya	2:09:50	Ruth Kutol	Kenya	2:28:16	
1999	Julius Bitok	Kenya	2:10:34	Sonia Maccioni	Italy	2:28:54	
1998	Japhet Kosgei	Kenya	2:11:27	Lucilla Andreucci	Italy	2:30:34	
1997	Antonio Serrano	Spain	2:11:59	Irina Kazakova	France	2:33:44	
1996	Sid-Ali Sakhri	Algeria	2:11:11	Alena Mazouka	Belarus	2:31:07	
1995	Danilo Goffi	Italy	2:09:26	Maura Viceconte	Italy	2:29:11	
1994	Tena Negere	Ethiopia	2:10:50	Ornella Ferrara	Italy	2:32:16	
1993	Artur Castro	Brazil	2:10:06	Helena Javornik	Slovenia	2:37:27	
1992	Joaquim Pinheiro	Portugal	2:13:33	Emma Scaunich	Italy	2:35:06	
1991	Carlo Terzer	Italy	2:14:49	Antonella Bizioli	Italy	2:36:56	
1990	Gelindo Bordin	Italy	2:13:41	Laura Fogli	Italy	2:38:33	
1989	Marco Milani	Italy	2:16:08	Emma Scaunich	Italy	2:36:02	
1988	Orlando Pizzolato	Italy	2:15:24	Graziella Striuli	Italy	2:39:04	
1987	Salvatore Bettiol	Italy	2:10:01	Rita Marchisio	Italy	2:29:36	
1986	Salvatore Bettiol	Italy	2:18:44	Paola Moro	Italy	2:38:10	
