= Konstantinos Gelaouzos =

Greek long-distance runner

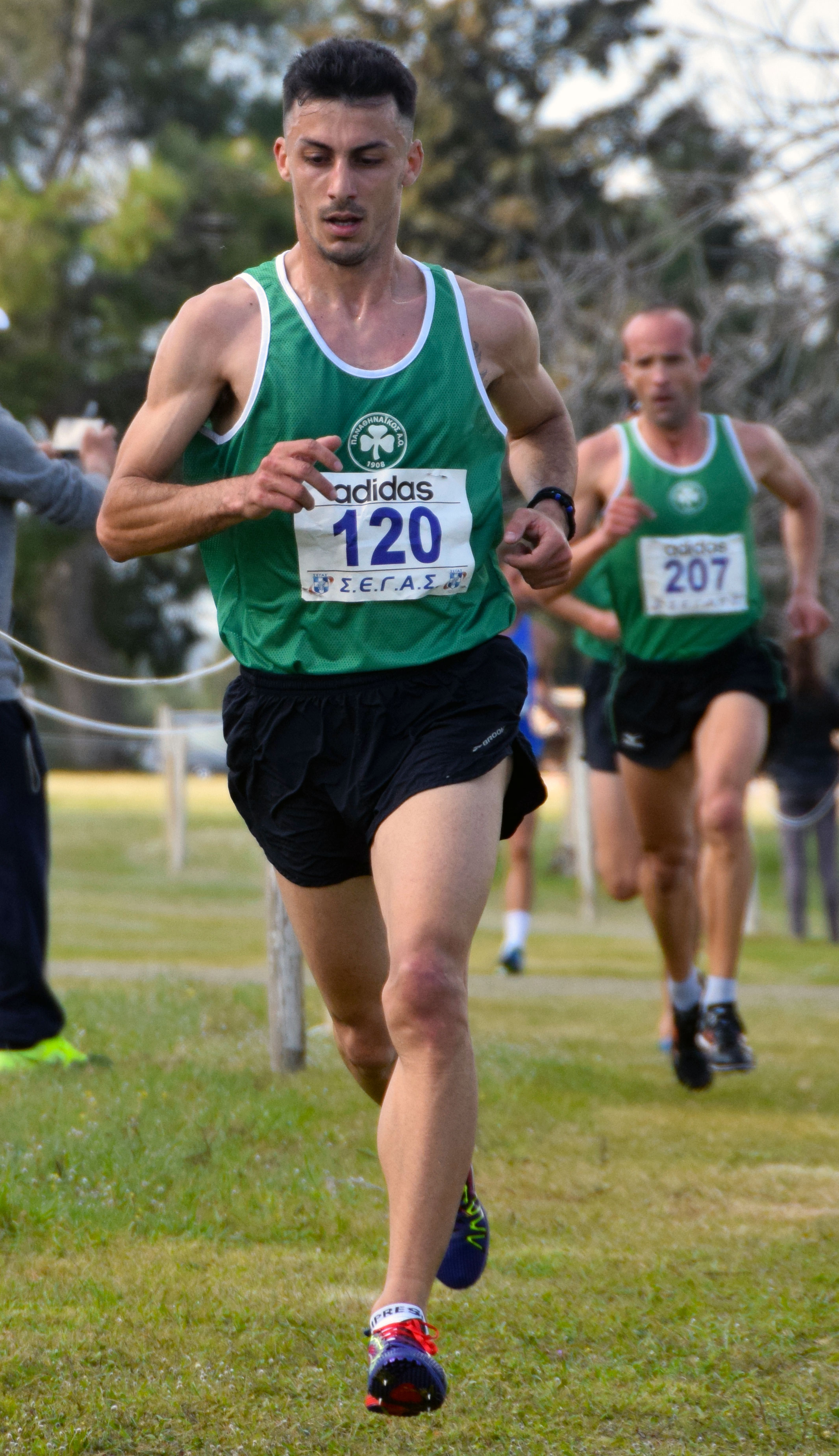

Personal information
- Nickname: Gkela
- Nationality: Greek
- Born: 21 November 1990 (age 35) Amfissa, Phocis
- Height: 1.75 m (5 ft 9 in)
- Weight: 67 kg (148 lb)

Sport
- Country: Greece
- Sport: Long-distance running
- Events: 1500 metres, 3000 metres, 5000 metres, 10,000 metres, half marathon, marathon
- Club: Panathinaikos

Achievements and titles
- Personal bests: 1500 metres: 3:49.01; 1500 metres ind.: 3:49.06; 3000 metres: 8:14.00; 3000 metres ind.: 8:18.23; 5000 metres: 14:22.41; 10000 metres: 30:50.27; 10K road: 29:17:00; Half Marathon: 1:05:09; Marathon: 2:14:15
- Updated on September 2022

Konstantinos Gelaouzos is a Greek long-distance runner. He was born on 21 November 1990 in Amfissa and resides in Athens. His personal best in the Marathon run (2:14:15) places him in the fifth place among all time Greek Marathon runners.

On 14 November 2021, with a time of 2:16:49 during the 2021 Athens Classic Marathon, he set the record for the fastest Greek runner of all time that has run the classic route.

Gelaouzos was punished by the National Anti-Doping Organization (EOCAN) with a four-year ban, effective from 1 December 2022 to 30 November 2026, for using the banned substance erythropoietin 4 years ineligibility.

== Competition record ==
Year	Competition	Venue	Position	Event	Notes
2016	European Championships	Amsterdam, Netherlands	61st	Half marathon	1:08:09
2017	European Team Championships	Lille, France	9th	5000 m	14:22.41 PB
2017	Athens Classic Marathon	Athens, Greece	8th	Marathon	2:27:21
2018	Mediterranean Games	Tarragona, Spain	15th	Half marathon	1:13:12
2018	European Championships	Berlin, Germany	44th	Marathon	2:22:24
2018	Athens Classic Marathon	Athens, Greece	7th	Marathon	2:21:54 PB
2019	Athens Classic Marathon	Athens, Greece	3rd	Marathon	2:19.02
2021	Athens Classic Marathon	Athens, Greece	1st	Marathon	2:16:49
