= Kipkosgei =

Kipkosgei, also written Kipkosgey and Kipkoskei, is a surname of Kenyan origin" Arap Kosgei means son Of Kipkosgei. Kipkosgei is not similar with Kipkogei it may refer to:

- Daniel Kipkosgei (born 1986), Kenyan long-distance track runner competing for Qatar as Essa Ismail Rashed
- Hellen Kimaiyo Kipkoskei (born 1968), Kenyan long-distance runner and two-time African champion
- Luke Kipkosgei (born 1975), Kenyan long-distance runner and world indoor medallist
- Paul Kipkosgei Kemboi (born 1990), Kenyan long-distance track runner competing for Turkey as Polat Kemboi Arıkan

== See also ==
- Kosgei, origin of Kipkosgei
- Jepkosgei, name meaning "daughter of Kosgei"
