= Belgrade Marathon =

Annual race in Serbia held since 1988

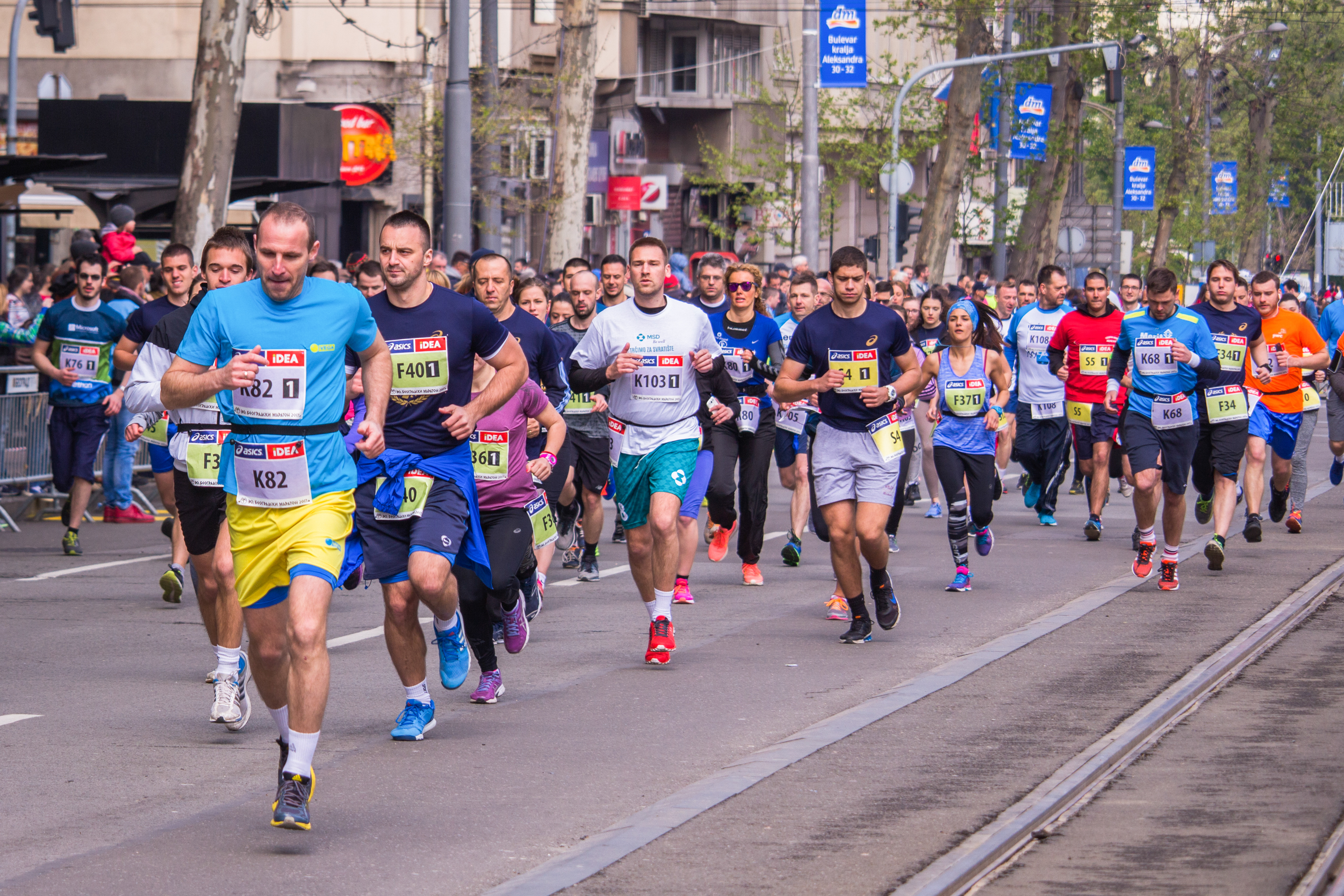
- 2017 edition of Belgrade Marathon
- Date: April
- Location: Belgrade, Serbia
- Event type: Road
- Distance: Marathon; Half marathon (including half marathon relay); 10K run Fun run Kids marathon
- Primary sponsor: ComTrade (2024 edition)
- Established: 1988 (38 years ago)
- Course records: Men's: 2:09:11 (2026) (Ethiopia) Gemsisa Gada; Women's: 2:26:48 (2025) (Kenya) Deborah Sang
- Website: Belgrade Marathon
- Participants: 11,249 (2025, all races); 1,545 marathon finishers (2025)

The Belgrade Marathon (Serbian: Београдски Маратон, romanized: Beogradski Maraton) is an annual marathon race held in Belgrade since 1988. It is typically held in April and also features a half marathon (including half marathon relay) and 10K run.

Additionally, a fun run for the public and kids marathon for the children is also organized. The Belgrade Marathon is one of the biggest sporting events in Serbia.

== History ==
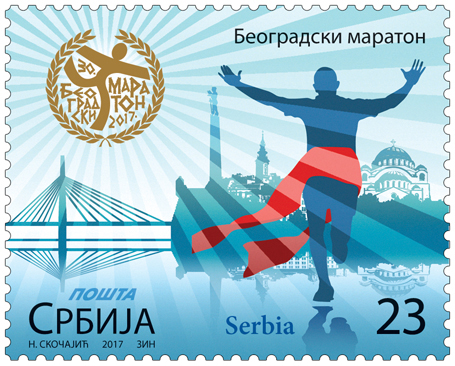
Serbian postage stamp featuring the 30th Belgrade Marathon in 2017

The origins of marathon culture in Belgrade trace back to 2 May 1910, when "Velika pešačka utakmica" (eng. "The Great Walking Race") took place from Obrenovac to Belgrade, with finishing line being in Košutnjak. Out of 97 participants, a bookstore owner Aleksandar Popović crossed the finishing line first and became a race winner.

The first modern marathon in Belgrade took place on 8 May 1988. It was 23 km (14 mi) long, and only Yugoslavian athletes participated. The track length of the 1989 marathon was 46.7 km (29.0 mi), with the start and finish being in front of the Federal Parliament Building.

Since 1990, the Belgrade Marathon has a standard 42.195 km (26.219 mi) length. The 1999 NATO bombing of Yugoslavia did not prevent the marathon from taking place that year, and on April 17 the race was held as a metered group run. About 40 runners from nine countries crossed the finish line at 3 hours 15 minutes and 16 seconds. The runners from NATO countries were Seine Brenson from the US, and Michael Turzynski and Heinz Lorber from Germany. The latter two are also founding members of the German 100 Marathon Club.

The JSD Partizan took it upon itself to organize the marathon. The City of Belgrade, its departments and communal services helped organize the event. Also involved were the executive bodies of city government, the Serbian Armed Forces, the Police of Serbia, and a number of sponsors. In September 2003, Belgrade declared that the Marathon is an event of special importance for the city. The same organisers also arrange the Belgrade Race through History, a race around the Belgrade Fortress, which started in 1996.

In 2020, the race was initially postponed to 18 October 2020 due to the coronavirus pandemic. However, the marathon was eventually cancelled after the organizers were unable to secure approval to hold the marathon with coronavirus controls in place. In 2022 edition, there were 668 finishers (105 women's and 563 men's) from 41 countries. In 2023, the record number of 10,000 participants and 885 marathon finishers ran the Belgrade Marathon. In 2024, that number increased to 13,000 participants and 1,264 marathon finishers.

== Other races ==
In addition to the marathon, the event also holds three other races:

- The half marathon is a half distance marathon (21.1 km) that is in accordance with world standards
- The half marathon relay;
- The 10K run.

Also, the event also holds two friendly enjoyment races:

- The fun run is a 2.3 km event;
- The kids marathon is a race for children, typically held week before the main events.

== Records and statistics ==
=== Winners ===
Course record
Serbian championship race

Date	Men's winner	Time	Women's winner	Time	Total marathon finishers	Ref.
2026.04.19	Gemsisa Gada (ETH)	2:09:11	Alemu Dadi (ETH)	2:30:22		
2025.04.06	Gilbert Chumba (KEN)	2:11:21	Deborah Sang (KEN)	2:26:48	1,545	
2024.04.28	Gilbert Chumba (KEN)	2:11:48	Emma Cheruto (KEN)	2:31:31	1,264	
2023.04.23	Chakib Lachgar (SPA)	2:14:28	Feyne Gemeda (ETH)	2:30:30	885	
2022.05.15	Feyissa Mulgeta (ETH)	2:12:57	Tsedal Gebretsadik (ETH)	2:34:00	668	
2021.06.06	Silviu Stoica (ROM)	2:34:43	Nevena Jovanović (SRB)	3:12:27	498	
2020	Cancelled due to coronavirus pandemic					
2019.04.14	Isaac Kiprop (KEN)	2:16:54	Judith Jeptum (KEN)	2:45:04	988	
2018.04.21	Kristijan Stošić (SRB)	2:45:23	Nora Trklja (SRB)	3:08:46	898	
2017.04.22	Stephen Katam (KEN)	2:21:12	Olivera Jevtić (SRB)	2:38:03	896	
2016.04.17	Albert Rop (KEN)	2:23:59	Stella Barsosio (KEN)	2:43:41	732	
2015.04.18	Silas Sang (KEN)	2:14:42	Abebu Gelan (ETH)	2:34:14	605	
2014.04.27	Bernard Talam (KEN)	2:14:35	Valary Aiyabei (KEN)	2:37:08	433	
2013.04.21	Edwin Kitum (KEN)	2:19:34	Olivera Jevtić (SRB)	2:36:12	322	
2012.04.22	James Barmasai (KEN)	2:16:01	Mary Ptikani (KEN)	2:42:47	291	
2011.04.17	Gebrselassie Tsegaye (ETH)	2:14:41	Frasiah Waithaka (KEN)	2:34:31	276	
2010.04.18	Johnstone Maiyo (KEN)	2:16:23	Hellen Mugo (KEN)	2:41:19	202	
2009.04.18	Victor Kigen (KEN)	2:13:28	Anne Kosgei (KEN)	2:34:51	285	
2008.04.19	William Kipchumba (KEN)	2:14:03	Natalia Chatkina (BLR)	2:46:24	168	
2007.04.21	John Maluni (KEN)	2:11:53	Olivera Jevtić (SRB)	2:35:46	177	
2006.04.22	Japhet Kosgei (KEN)	2:10:54	Halina Karnatsevich (BLR)	2:34:35	129	
2005.04.23	Medeksa Derba (ETH)	2:12:10	Inga Abitova (RUS)	2:38:20	126	
2004.04.24	Christopher Isengwe (TAN)	2:12:53	Rose Nyangacha (KEN)	2:35:55		
2003.10.18 (Note: Postponed from April to October, due to state of emergency in the country, following the assassination of prime minister Zoran Đinđić.)	Benson Ogato (KEN)	2:14:48	Zhanna Malkova (RUS)	2:40:24		
2002.04.20	Geoffrey Kinyua (KEN)	2:18:48	Rodica Chiriţă (ROM)	2:40:55		
2001.04.21	Mluleki Nobanda (RSA)	2:15:11	Cristina Pomacu (ROM)	2:29:44		
2000.04.22	Thabiso Moqhali (LES)	2:15:08	Cristina Pomacu (ROM)	2:36:54		
1999.04.17	Official group run as demonstration against NATO bombing of Yugoslavia			3:15:16		
1998.04.25	Reuben Chebutich (KEN)	2:12:51	Irina Bogacheva (KGZ)	2:32:07		
1997.04.19	Josephat Ndeti (KEN)	2:13:38	Irina Bogacheva (KGZ)	2:34:57		
1996.04.20	Hussein Salah (DJI)	2:14:15	Izabela Zatorska (POL)	2:36:51		
1995.04.22	Vladimir Kotov (BLR)	2:14:00	Izabela Zatorska (POL)	2:40:27		
1994.04.23	Vladimir Bukhanov (UKR)	2:12:28	Cristina Pomacu (ROM)	2:33:08		
1993.04.24	Jacob Ngunzu (KEN)	2:16:09	Suzana Ćirić (YUG)	2:40:27		
1992.04.25	Nicolas Nyengerai (ZIM)	2:16:07	Garifa Blaizanova (KAZ)	2:45:12		
1991.05.04	Agapius Masong (TAN)	2:16:23	Karla Mališová (TCH)	2:47:10		
1990.05.05	Joseph Nzau (KEN)	2:19:32	Suzana Ćirić (YUG)	2:45:08		
1989.05.06	Dragan Isailović (YUG)	2:34:48 (Note: Course was 46.7 km (29.0 mi) in length.)	Suzana Ćirić (YUG)	3:03:21		
1988.05.08	Rifat Zilkić (YUG)	1:09:02 (Note: Course was 23 km (14 mi) in length.)	Radislavka Račić (YUG)	No data		

=== Winners by country ===
Note: Updated as of 2026 Belgrade Marathon

Nation	Men's winner
Kenya	20
Ethiopia	4
Yugoslavia	2
Tanzania	2
Zimbabwe	1
Ukraine	1
Belarus	1
Djibouti	1
Lesotho	1
South Africa	1
Serbia	1
Romania	1
Spain	1

Nation	Women's winner
Kenya	10
Serbia	5
Romania	4
Ethiopia	4
Yugoslavia	3
Poland	2
Kyrgyzstan	2
Russia	2
Belarus	2
Czechoslovakia	1
Kazakhstan	1
FR Yugoslavia	1

== Gallery ==
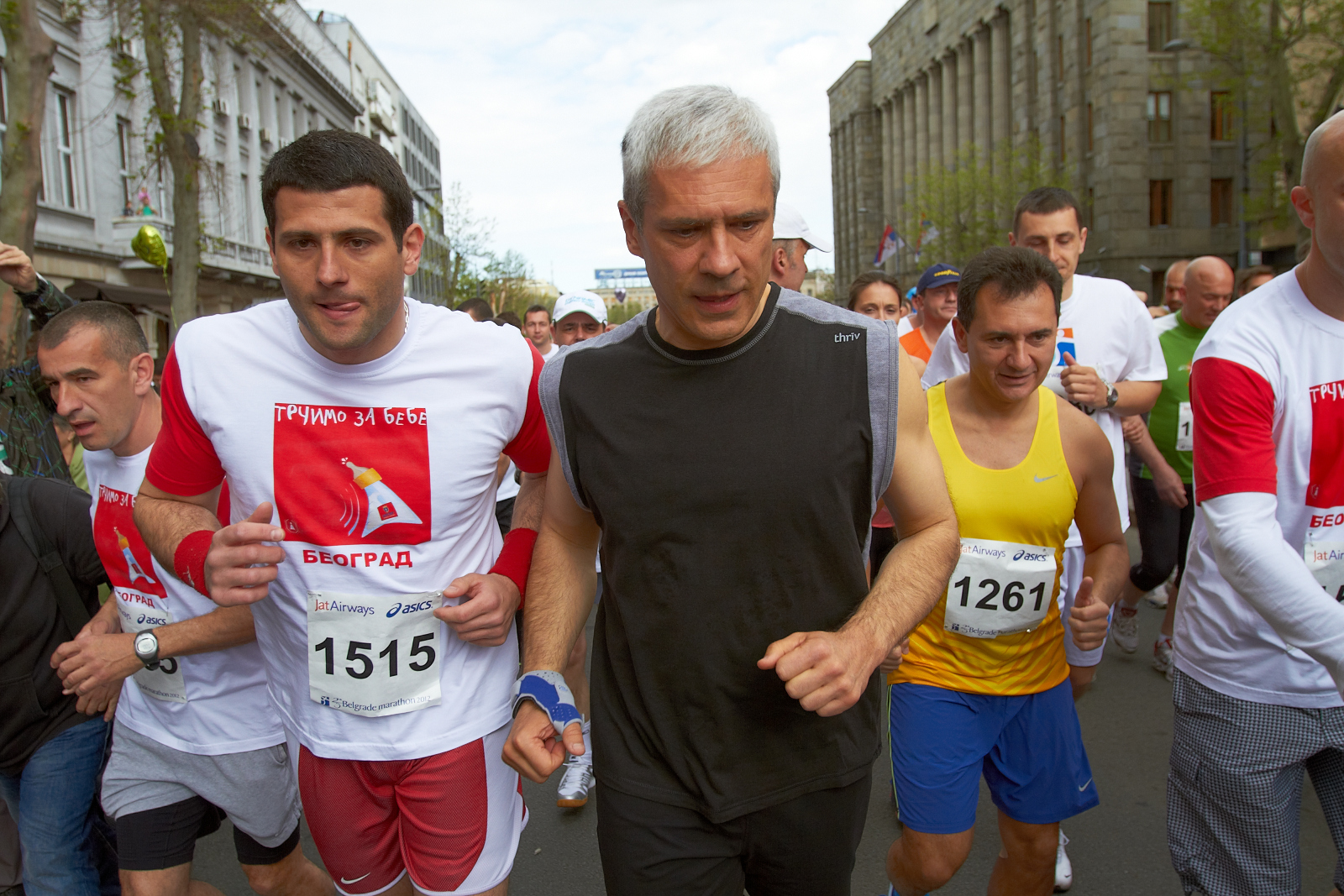
Serbian politicians Aleksandar Šapić, Boris Tadić, and Božidar Đelić during the 25th Belgrade Marathon in 2012

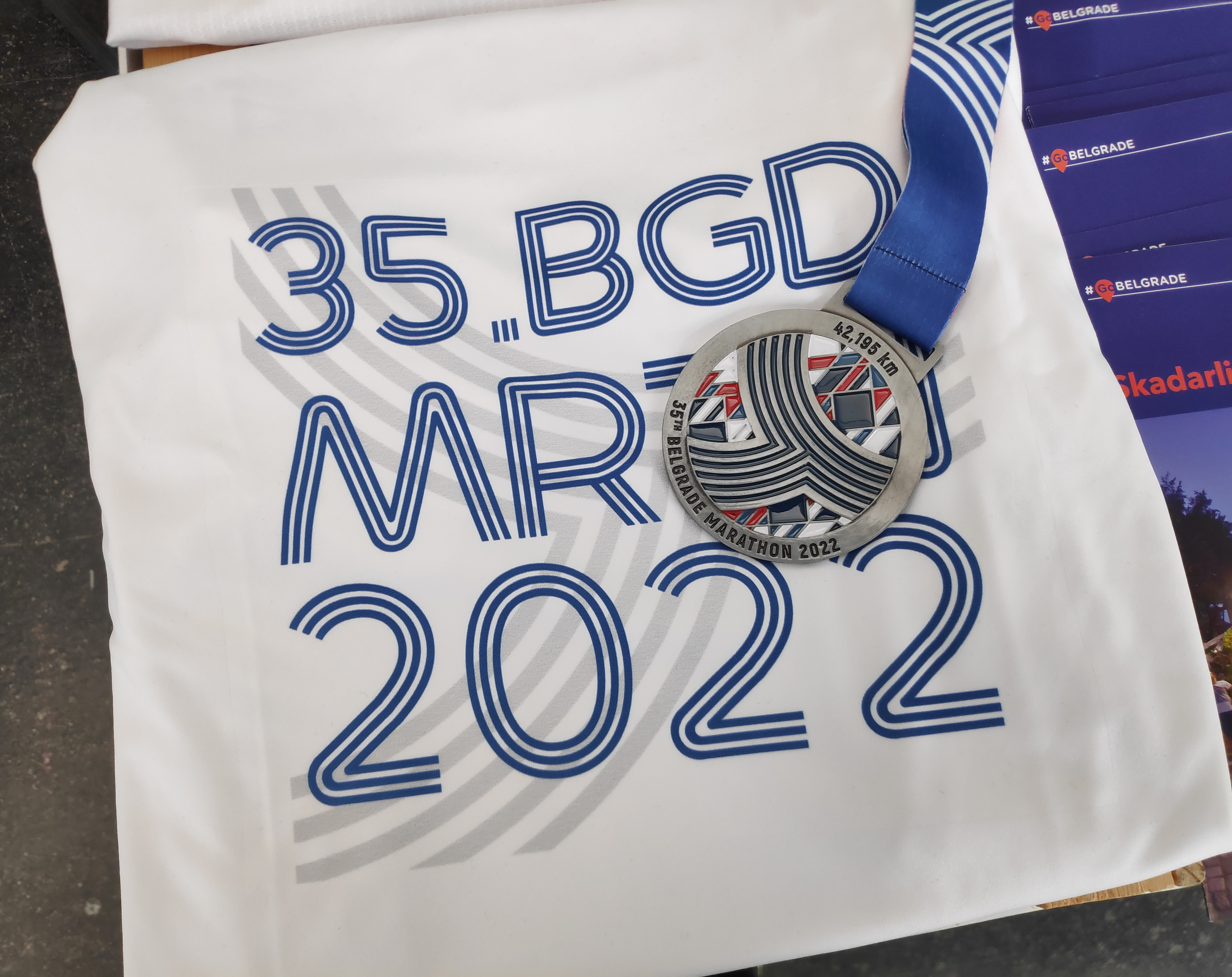
2022 shirt and medal

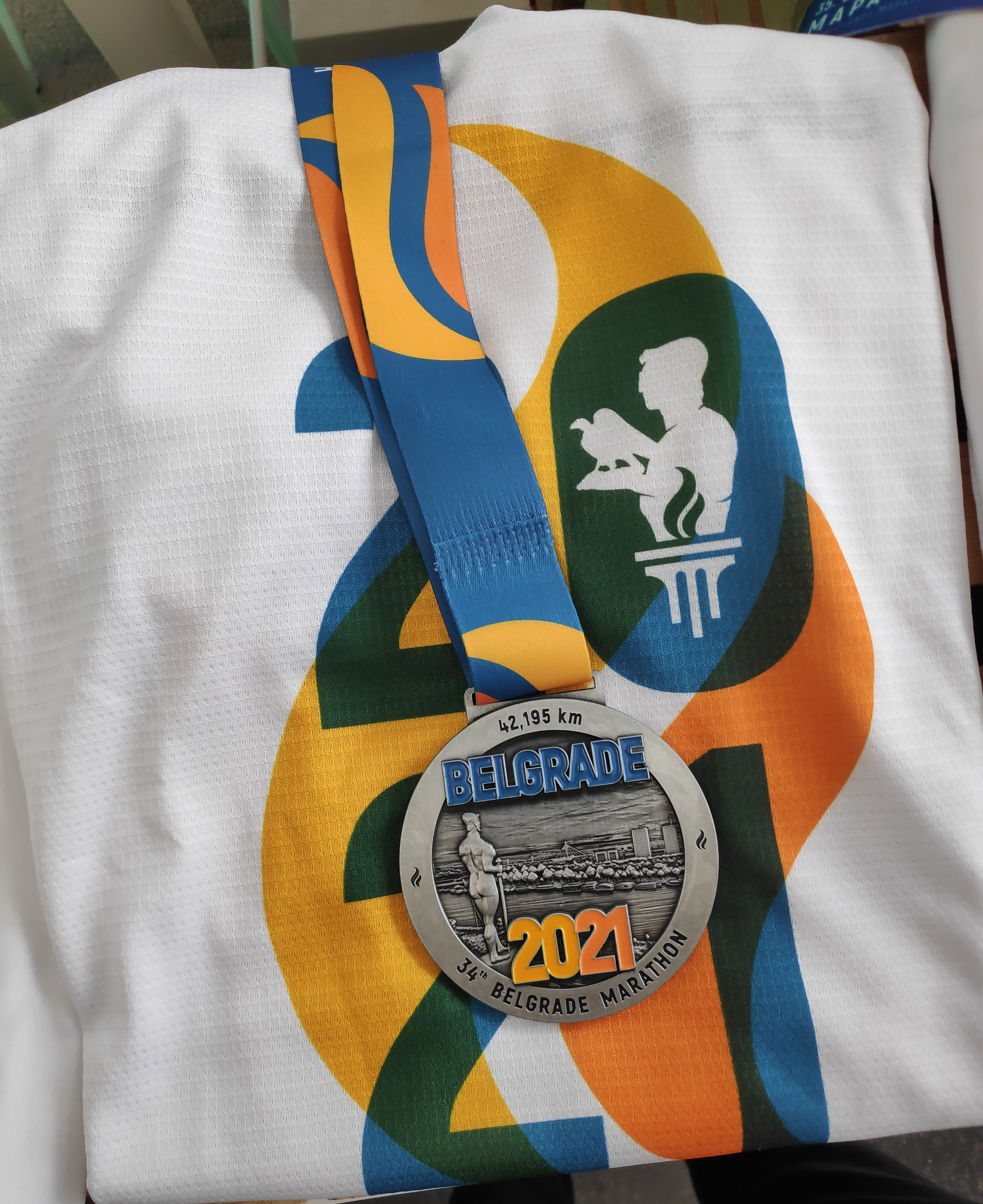
2021 shirt and medal

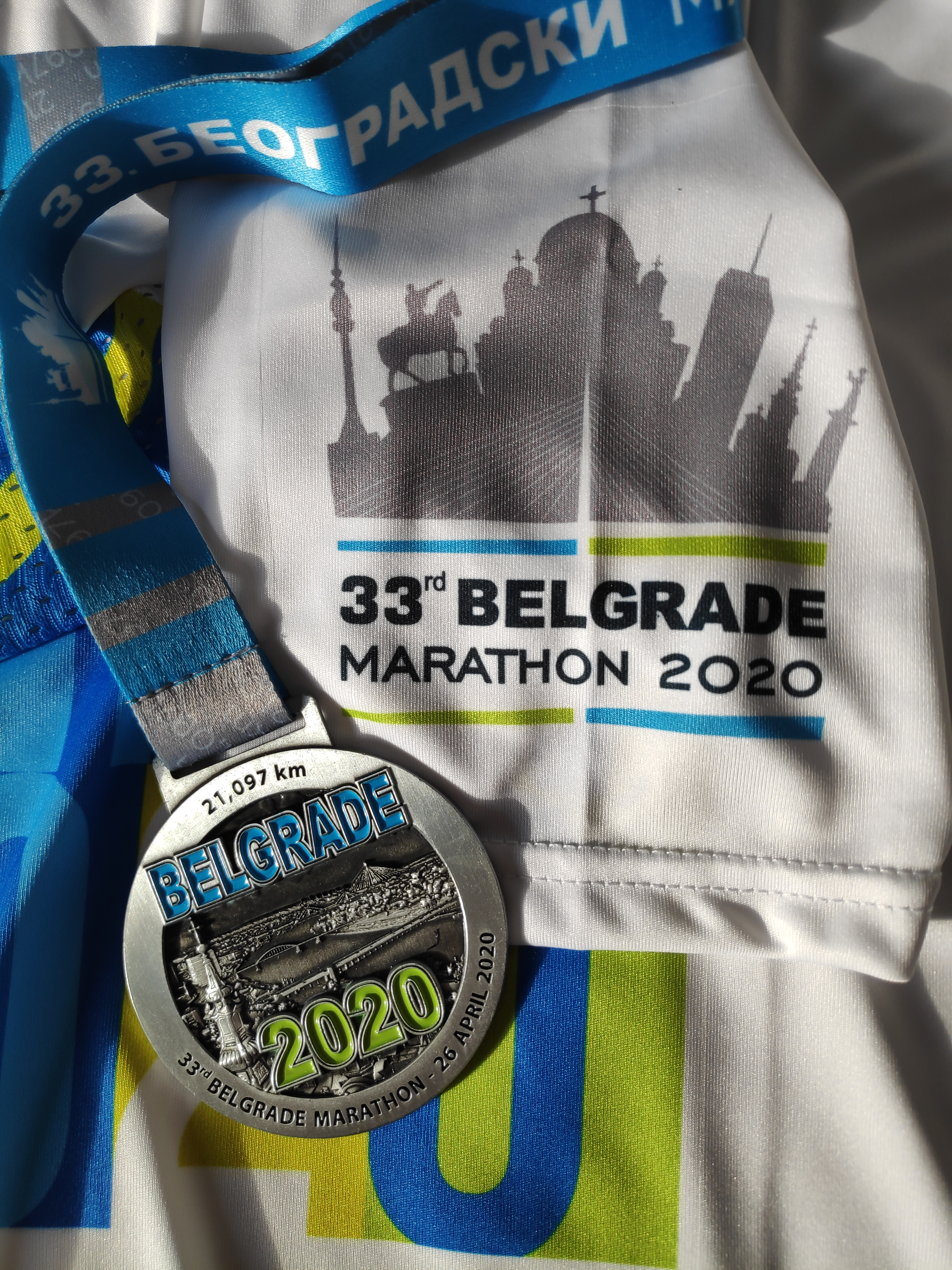
2020 shirt and medal (Virtuel marathon)

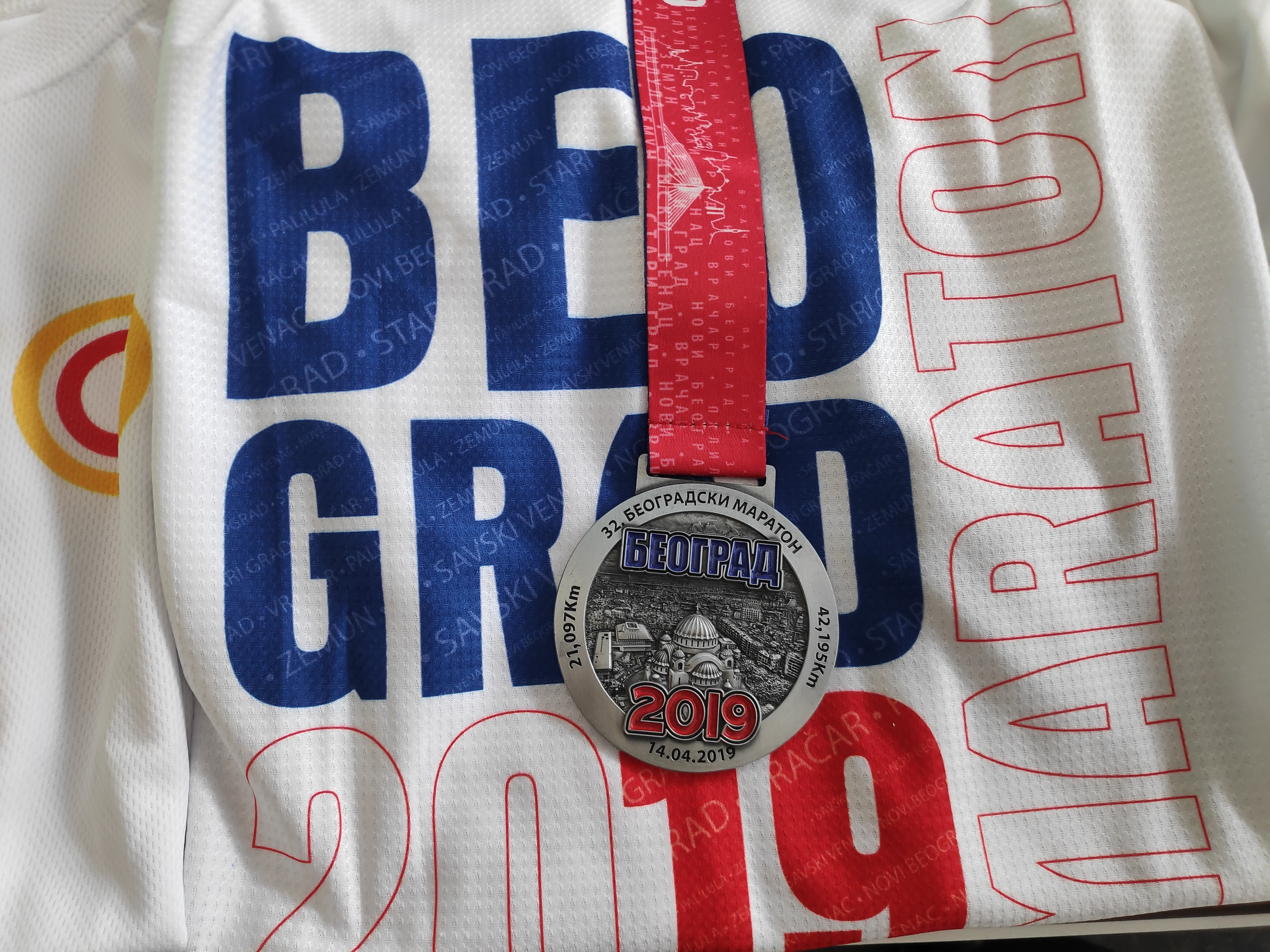
2019 shirt and medal

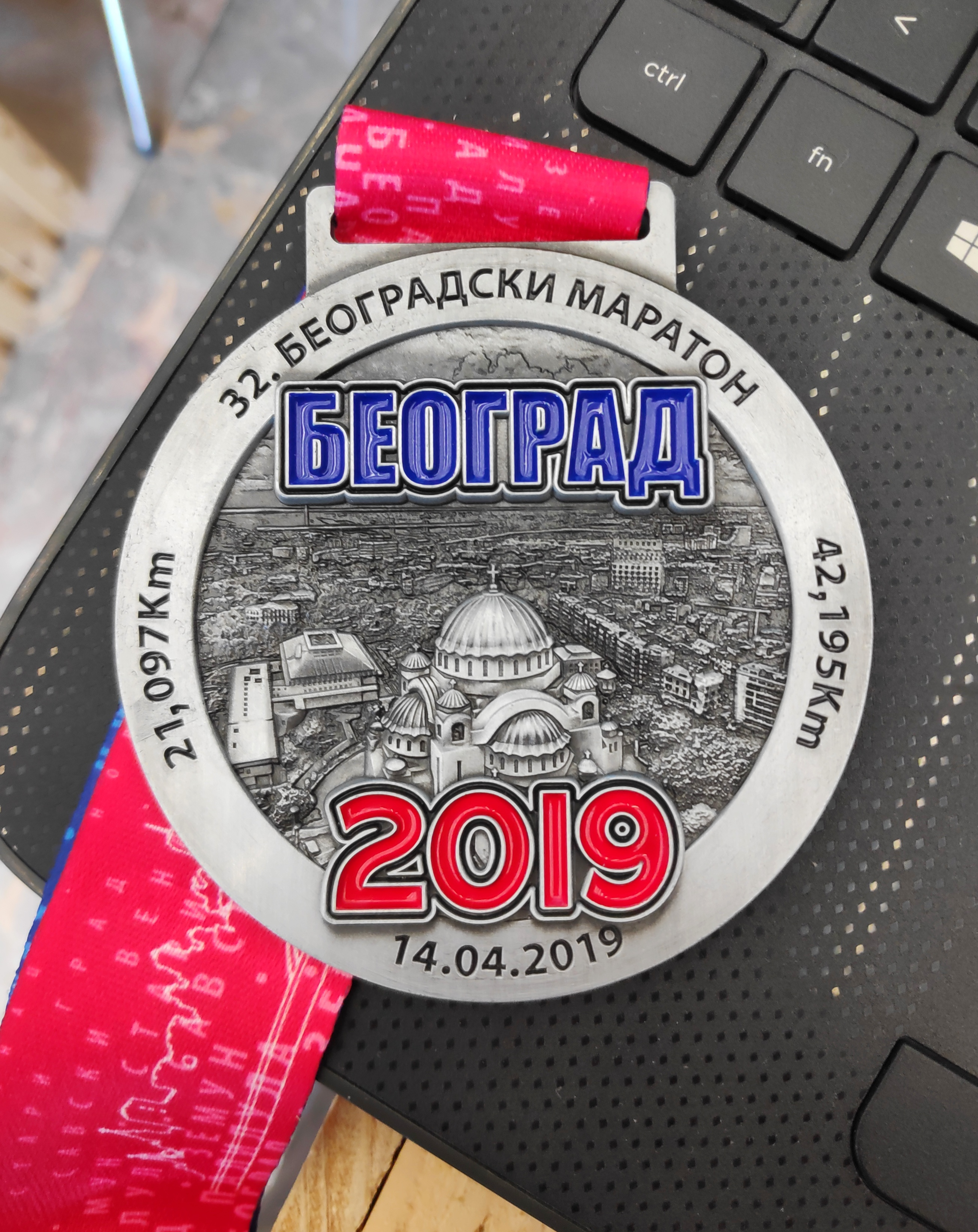
Finisher medal in 2019

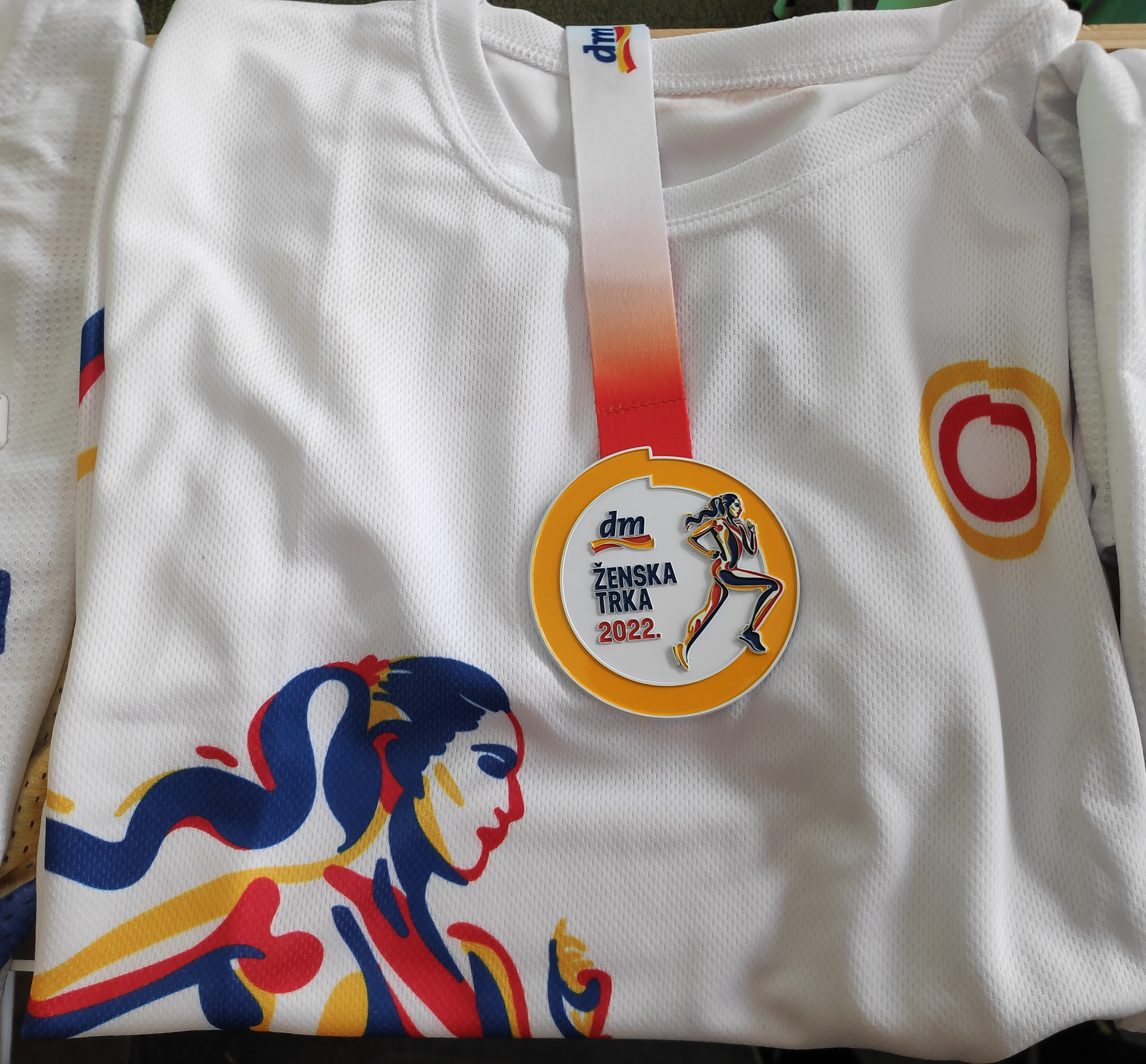
2022 Dm women's run shirt and medal

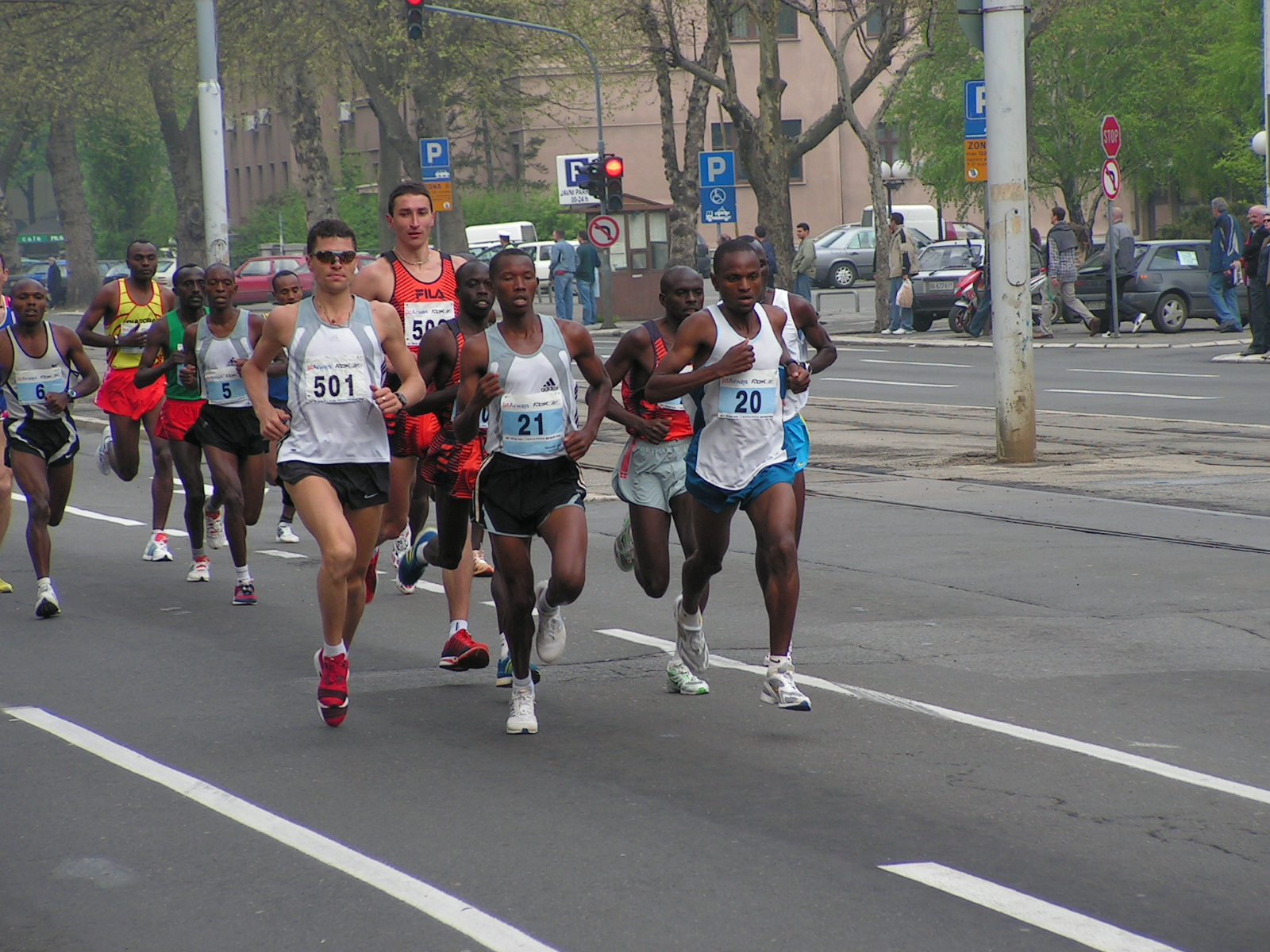
The men's race in 2006 edition

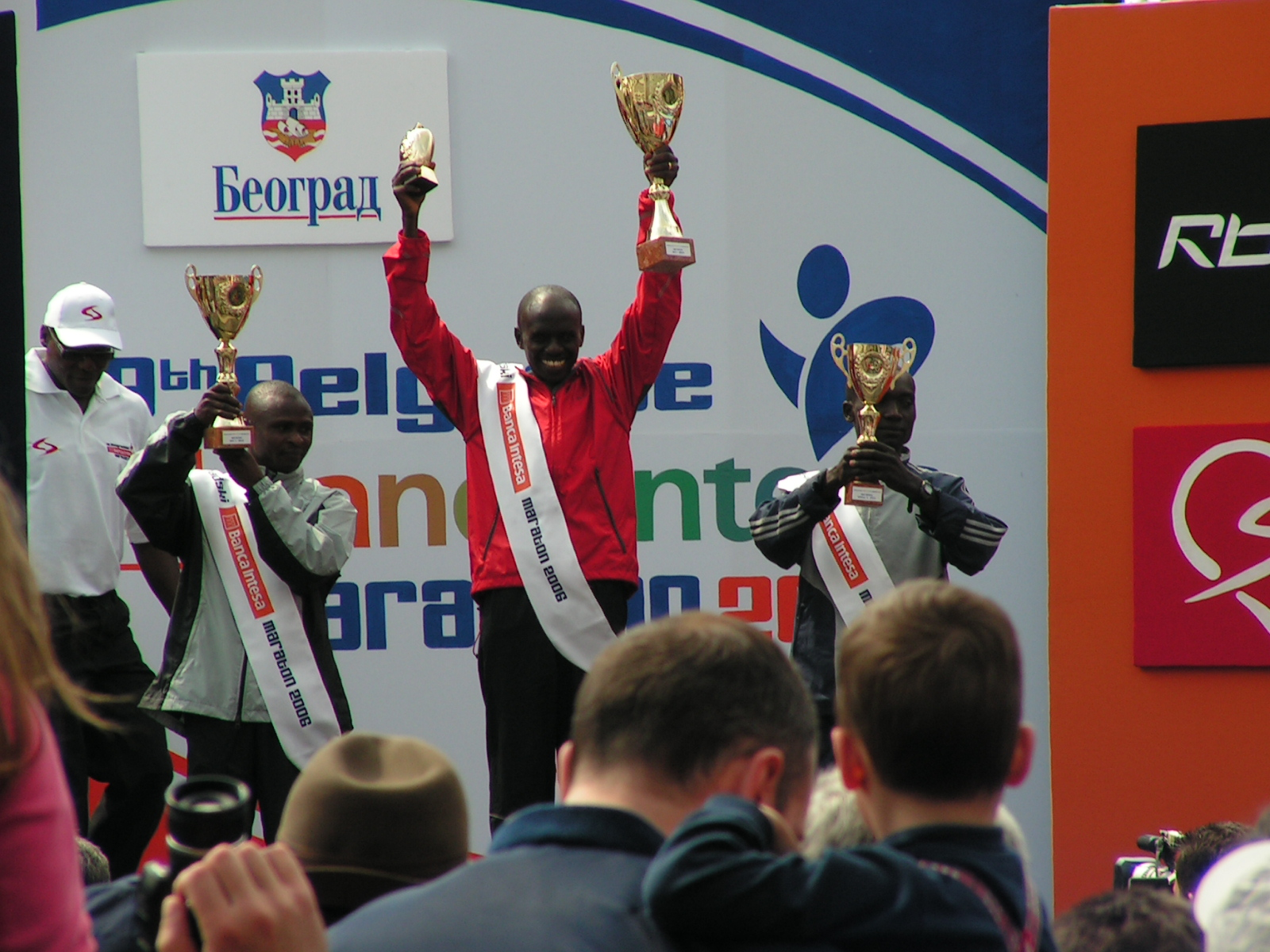
William Kwambai Kipchumba topped the podium in 2008 edition

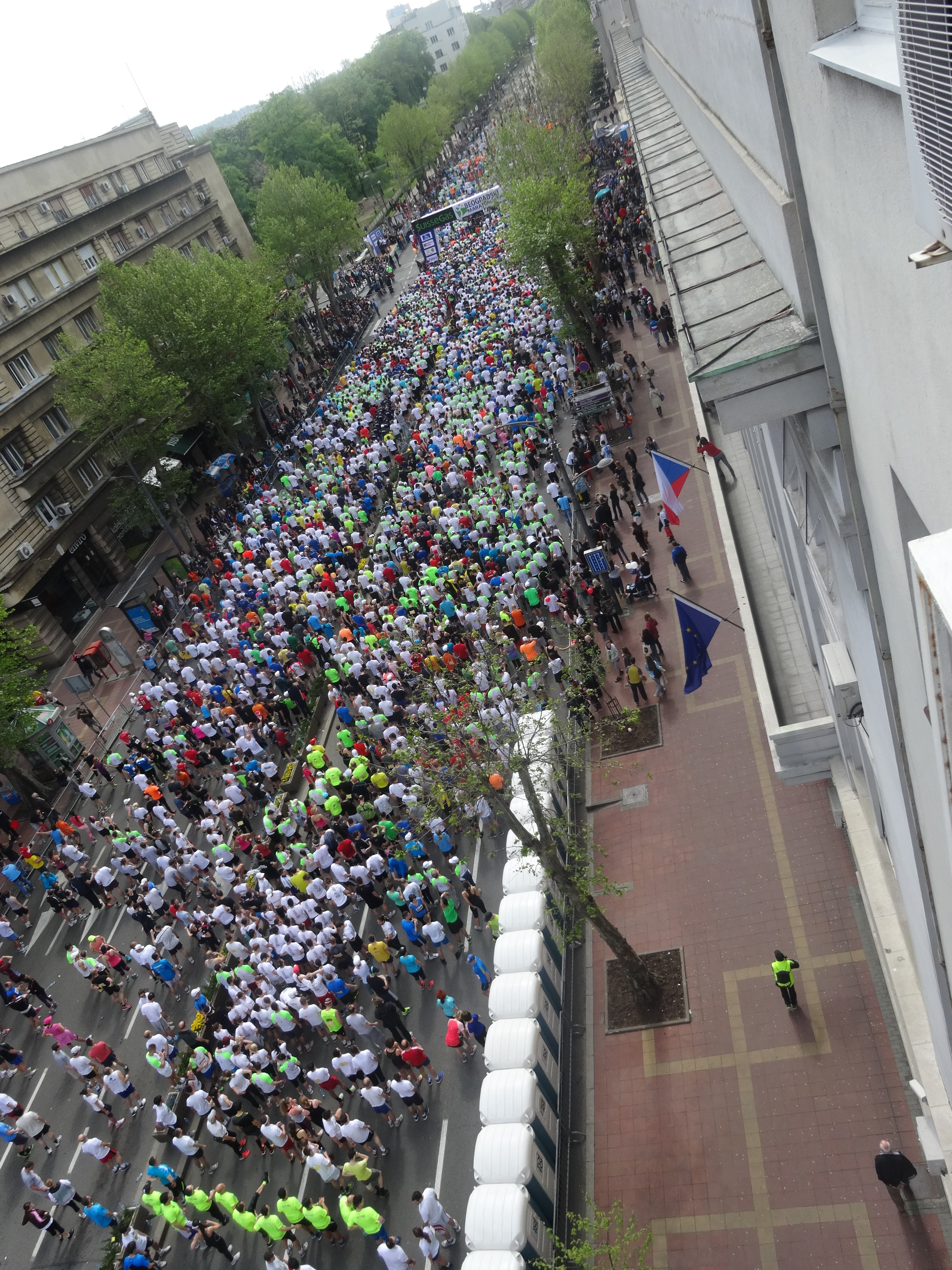
Start line in 2014 edition

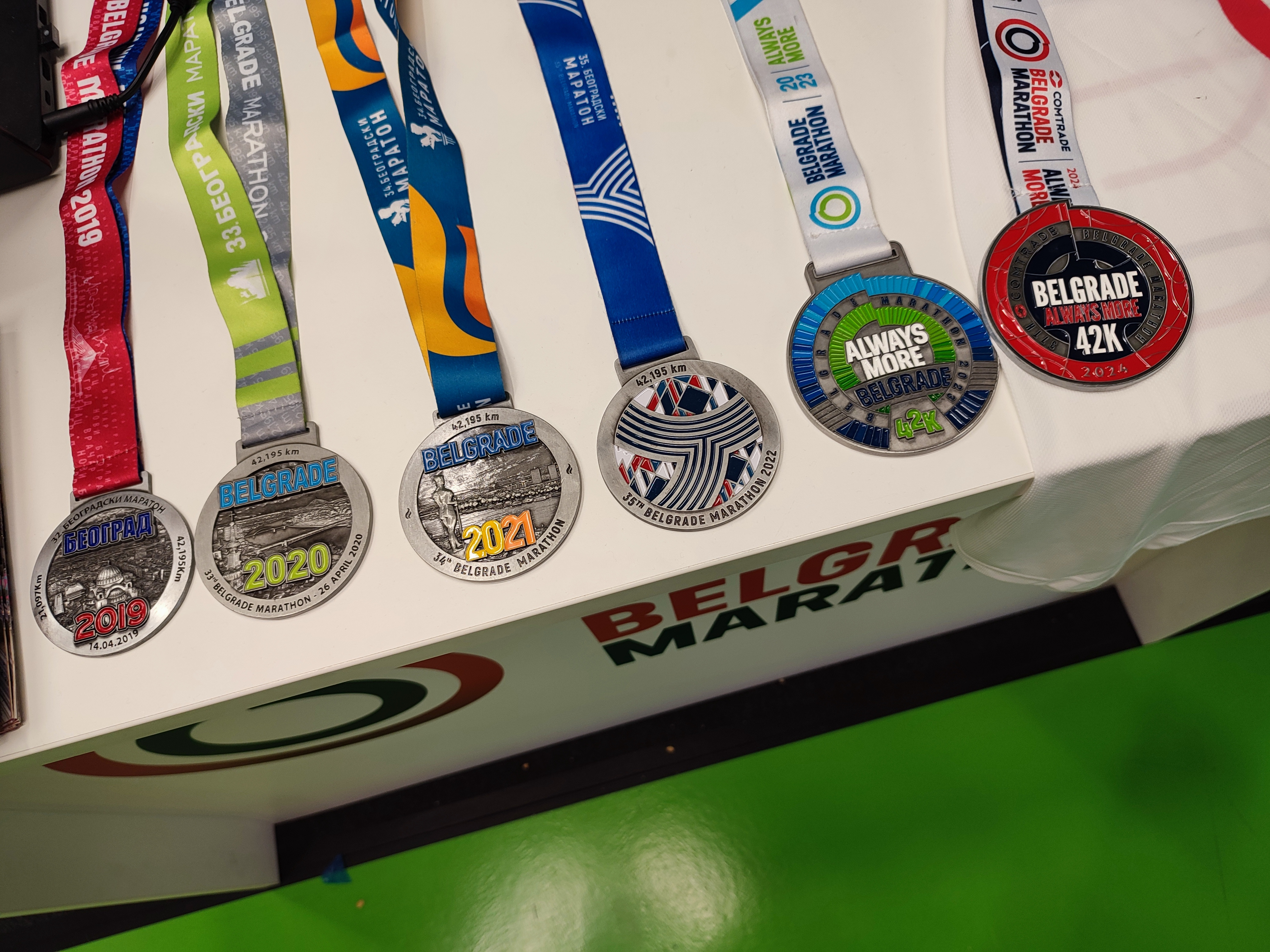
Medal from 2019 to 2024
Winners of 30th Belgrade Marathon (2017)

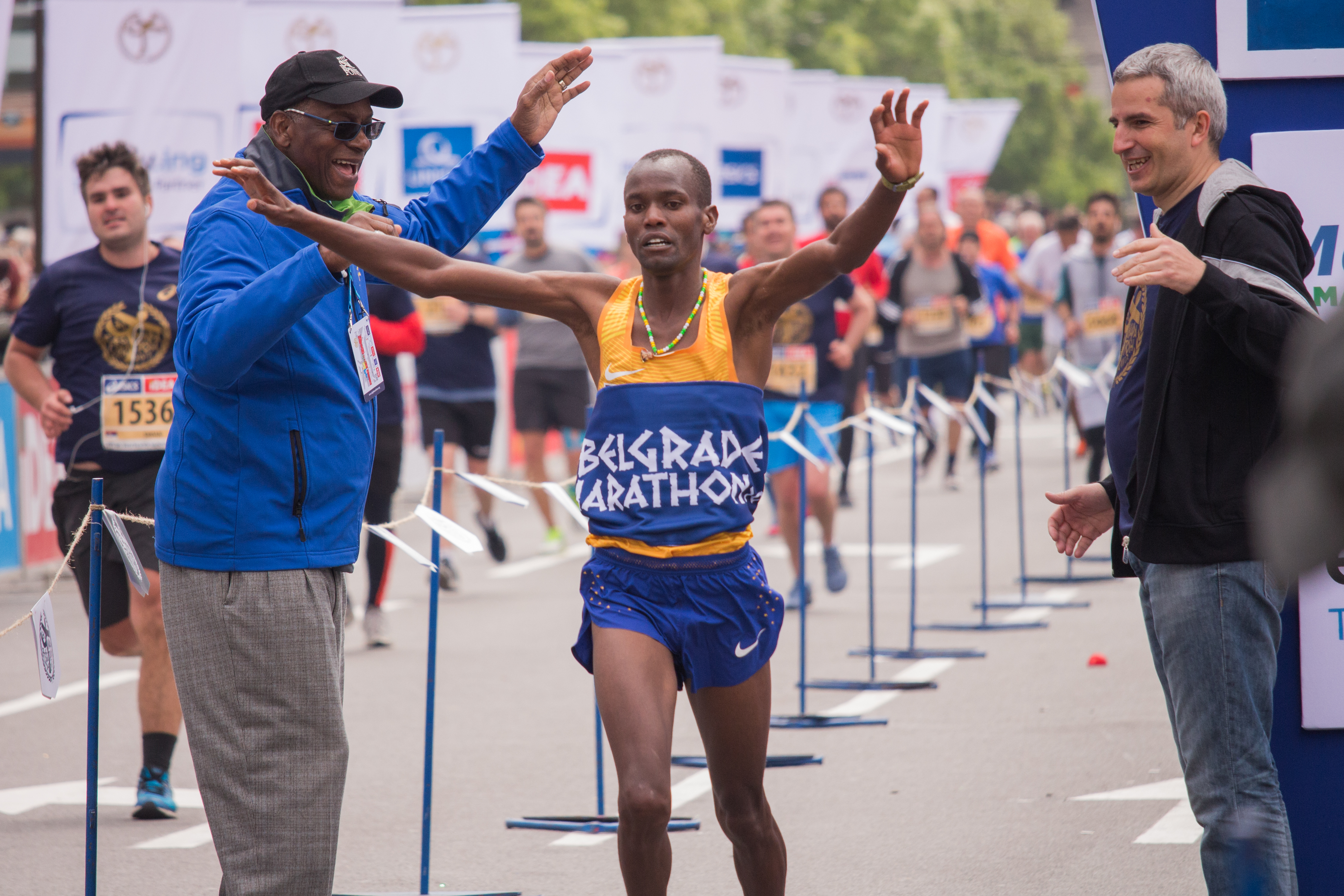
Stephen Katam from Kenya

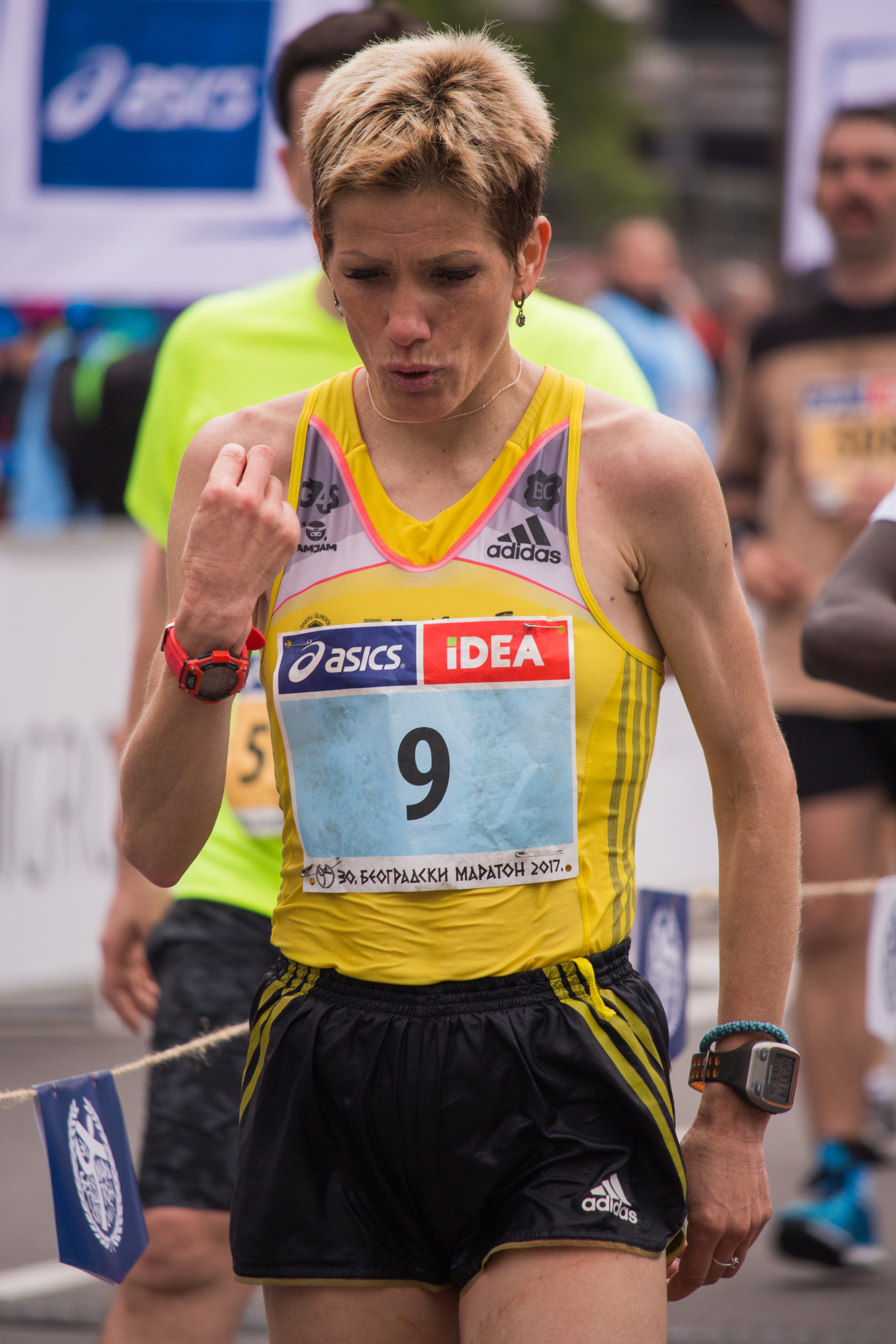
Olivera Jevtić from Serbia

Winners of 29th Belgrade Marathon (2016)

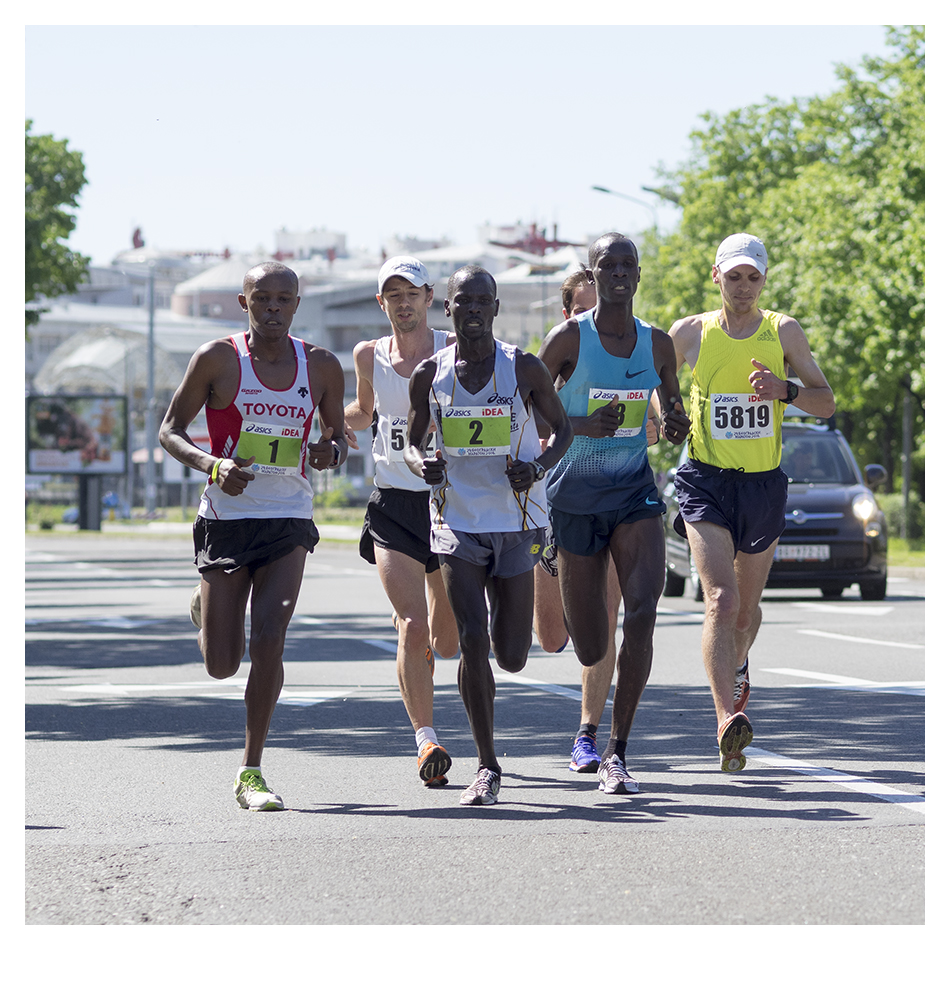
Abel Kibet Rop (blue jersey) from Kenya

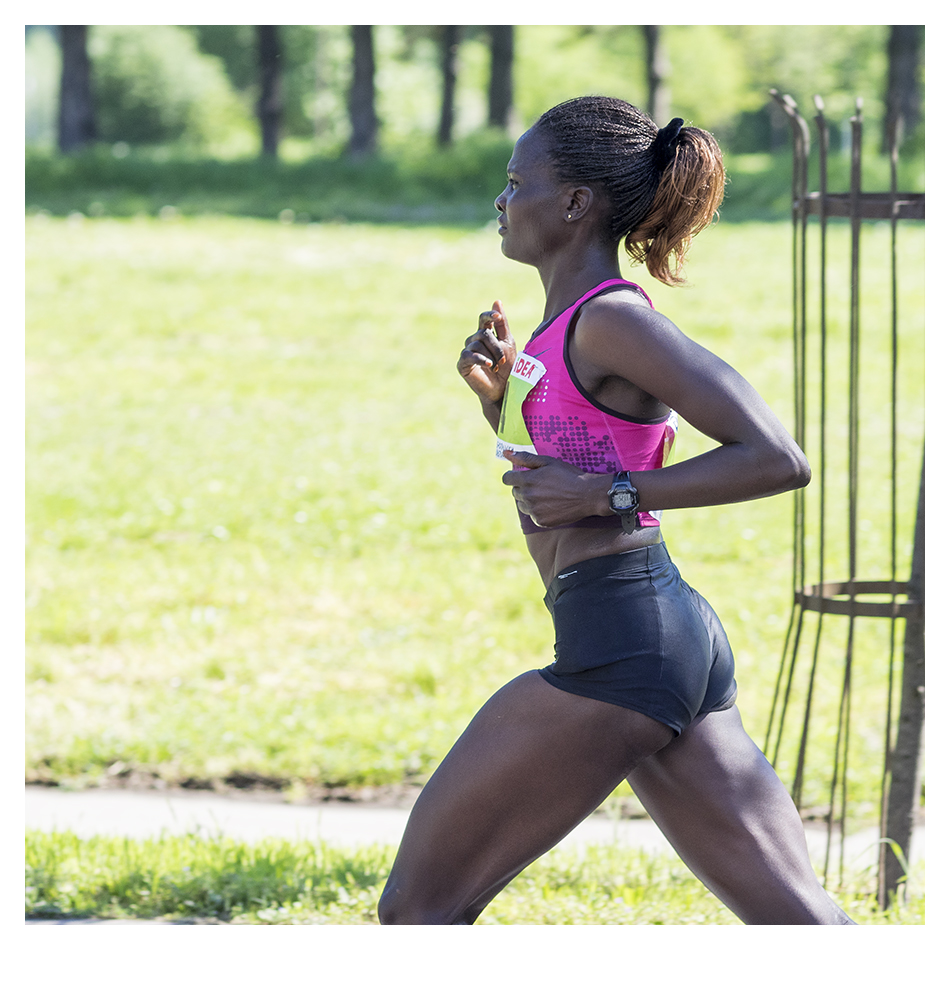
Stella Barsosio Jeptenegich from Ethiopia
