= Leslie Lewis (marathon runner) =

American marathon runner

Leslie Lewis (born February 13, 1955) is a former American marathon runner.

She won the Athens Classic Marathon in 1989 with her personal best of 2:37:42 and competed in 1990 Goodwill Games and the 1995 Catalina Marathon.
