= Jepkosgei =

Jepkosgei or Chepkosgei is a surname of Kenyan origin that may refer to:

- Janeth Jepkosgei (born 1983), Kenyan middle-distance runner
- Jane Jepkosgei Kiptoo (born 1982), Kenyan female marathon runner
- Joyciline Jepkosgei (born 1993), Kenyan long-distance runner
- Mary Jepkosgei Keitany (born 1982), Kenyan marathon runner
- Sally Jepkosgei Kipyego (born 1985), Kenyan long-distance track runner

== See also ==
- Kosgei
- Kipkosgei
