= Cristina Pomacu =

Romanian long-distance runner

Cristina Pomacu /pʲomaku/ (born 15 September 1973 in Calafat, Dolj) is a female long-distance runner from Romania who mainly competed in the marathon. She is a triple winner of the annual Belgrade Marathon (1994, 2000 and 2001), and twice won the silver medal at the IAAF World Half Marathon Championships (1995 and 1997).

Pomacu competed in the women's marathon at the 1994 European Athletics Championships (taking 24th place) and was chosen to represent Romania at the 1996 Atlanta Olympics (although she failed to finish the race). She was ever present at the World Half Marathon Championships from 1995 to 2000 and frequently finished in the top ten, forming part of a strong Romanian women's team.

== Achievements ==
Year	Competition	Venue	Position	Event	Notes
Representing Romania
1994	Belgrade Marathon	Belgrade, Yugoslavia	1st	Marathon	2:33:08
1994	European Championships	Helsinki, Finland	24th	Marathon	2:40.48
1996	Olympic Games	Atlanta, United States	—	Marathon	DNF
2000	Belgrade Marathon	Belgrade, Yugoslavia	1st	Marathon	2:36:54
2000	World Half Marathon Championships	Veracruz, Mexico	7th	Half marathon	1:12:06
2001	Belgrade Marathon	Belgrade, Yugoslavia	1st	Marathon	2:29:44
