= Raymond Kimutai Bett =

Kenyan marathon runner

Raymond Kimutai Bett (born 1984 in Iten) is a Kenyan long-distance runner who competes in the marathon.

== Biography ==
He ran at the Rad&Run am Ring in Nürburg in 2005, winning the running competition on the Nürburgring Formula One circuit with a course record time. In 2007 he won the Halve van Hoogland half marathon in a personal best of 1:06:35 and also at De 30 van Almere, completing the 30 km race in 1:30:59. He made his debut over the marathon distance at the Brussels Marathon and was ninth with a time of 2:23:40.

Bett ran at the Utrecht Marathon in March 2008 and he led for much of the race, eventually taking second place after being out-sprinted to the line by Sammy Chumba. He improved upon his time at the Eindhoven Marathon in October, running 2:11:57, bringing him sixth place at the higher profile race. He returned to the competition in Utrecht the following year and just missed out on a podium finish with a personal best run of 2:11:32, finishing behind Aadam Ismaeel Khamis.

His next major competition came in October 2010 at the Athens Classic Marathon, which was celebrating the 2500th anniversary of the Battle of Marathon. His compatriot Jonathan Kipkorir was the favourite for the race but Bett upset the predictions by going on to win his first ever marathon. He led the race alongside the pacemakers and crossed the line over a minute ahead of the competition to improve Paul Lekuraa's race record to 2:12:40. "It is my first marathon victory and I feel good", he said. "It is a difficult course with a lot of hills and up and downs." He set his sights on returning the following year in order to attempt to beat Stefano Baldini's overall course record set during the 2004 Athens Olympics.

He did not compete in 2011 but returned in 2012 with his sights back on the Athens race, training on hills to improve his technique. After a runner-up finish at the Lens Marathon in France, his hill work paid off at the Athens Marathon as he ran the difficult second half of the marathon faster than the first, going on to break the race record with a run of 2:11:35 hours. This was still off Baldini's mark, but again he vowed to return and try again. Bett's victory made him the first non-Greek man to win the race twice.
