= Jonathan Kosgei Kipkorir =

Kenyan long-distance runner (born 1982)

Jonathan Kosgei Kipkorir (born 29 December 1982) is a Kenyan long-distance runner who competes in road running competitions, including marathons. He is a two-time winner of the Venice Marathon, with consecutive wins in 2006 and 2007, and won the 2010 Beppu-Ōita Marathon. He also competes over the half marathon and has wins from the Rome-Ostia Half Marathon and Porto Half Marathon. His personal best in the marathon is 2:07:31 while he has run 1:00:19 for the half marathon distance.

== Career ==
He began his professional career in Europe around 2004 and one of his first elite races was the Rotterdam Half Marathon, where he ran a time of 1:03:13 for sixth place. He also placed third at the Trofeo Podistico Internazionale Maria SS degli Ammalati race in Sicily that year. He entered the 2005 Berlin Half Marathon and finished in tenth place.

He made his debut over the marathon distance (42.195 km) at the Xiamen International Marathon the following March and completed the course in 2:10:49, finishing as runner-up behind Stephen Kamar. He ran in the Udine Half Marathon and finished the race with a personal best time of 1:00:47 for fourth place. The following month he ran at the Venice Marathon and took his first victory over the distance. A duel against Alberico Di Cecco in the final stages saw the Kenyan eke out a win, finishing just three seconds ahead of the home athlete with a personal best run of 2:10:18. He entered the Shanghai Marathon in November which went to a photo finish alongside Paul Korir. The runners achieved the same time but Kipkorir was declared to be the runner-up.

He opened his 2007 season with a runner-up performances at the Discovery Half Marathon in Eldoret and the Rome-Ostia Half Marathon, finishing behind Benson Barus on both occasions. His first race over the full distance that year came at the Rome City Marathon in March and he took third place, while his training partner Elias Kemboi Chelimo was the winner. He won the Porto Half Marathon in September as preparation for a title defence in Venice. He completed his second Venice win in a tactical manner, running at a measured pace and gradually moving away from Philemon Tarbei to take first place.

He improved a place at the Rome-Ostia Half Marathon in 2008 with a career best run of 1:00:19, taking victory by controlling the pace and using his fast finish to beat his competitors. He also aimed to improve upon his Rome Marathon performance, but on his second attempt Kosgei finished in fifth place. At the Amsterdam Marathon in October he secured his first sub-2:10 time and was fourth behind Robert Cheboror in a time of 2:09:22. He knocked almost two minutes off this time at the 2009 Paris Marathon but in an exceptionally quick race, his time of 2:07:31 was only enough for seventh. This meant Kosgei had the unfortunate honour of having the fastest ever time for a seventh-place finish in a marathon. He ran his third marathon under two hours and ten minutes at the Eindhoven Marathon, finishing in fifth.

The third marathon win of Kosgei's career came in February 2010 at the Beppu-Ōita Marathon, as he outran second-placed Daniel Njenga as the course entered the final straight at Ōita Stadium. He ran in the Kenya National Cross Country Championships that month but he was ninth and did not gain selection for the world championships. An appearance at the São Paulo International Marathon saw him finish as runner-up behind Stanley Biwott. Kosgei was the pre-race favourite for the Athens Classic Marathon, a competition celebrating 2500 years since the Battle of Marathon, but he was beaten by Raymond Bett and ended up second past the post.
