= Lenah Cheruiyot =

Kenyan long-distance runner

Medal record

Women's athletics

Representing Kenya

IAAF World Half Marathon Championships
Gold medal – first place	2002 Brussels	Team

Lenah Jemutai Cheruiyot (born 1 March 1973) is a Kenyan former long-distance runner who competed mainly in road running competitions. Her highest international honour was a team gold medal at the IAAF World Half Marathon Championships in 2002, which she shared for finishing seventh. She competed in events up to the marathon distance and set a best of 2:26:00 hours for that event at the 2008 Paris Marathon, where she was placed third.

Although her international career was limited, she competed extensively on the professional road circuit and won many high calibre races, including: the Venice Marathon (twice), the Humarathon, Lille Half Marathon, Paris Half Marathon (twice), Porto Half Marathon, CPC Loop Den Haag, and 20 Kilomètres de Paris. She had 41 career victories in distance running.

== International competitions ==
Year	Competition	Venue	Position	Event	Notes
2002	World Half Marathon Championships	Brussels, Belgium	7th	Half marathon	1:09:39
2002	World Half Marathon Championships	Brussels, Belgium	1st	Team	3:28:22

== Circuit wins ==
- Venice Marathon: 2006, 2007
- Humarathon: 2004
- Lille Half Marathon: 2004
- Paris Half Marathon: 2005, 2008
- Porto Half Marathon: 2007
- CPC Loop Den Haag: 2002
- 20 Kilomètres de Paris: 2004
- Würzburger Residenzlauf: 2002, 2001
- Paderborner Osterlauf: 2002
- Parelloop: 2002
- Breda Singelloop: 2001
- Lotto Crosscup de Hannut: 2003
- Sylvestercross: 2002

== Personal bests ==
- 5000 metres – 15:44.54 min (2001)
- 10K run – 31:21 min (2002)
- Half marathon – 68:54 min (2002)
- Marathon – 2:26:00 (2008)
