= Athens Classic Marathon =

Annual race in Greece held since 1972

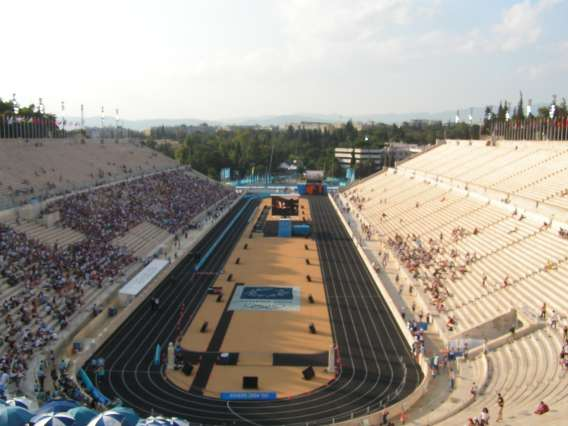
- Panathinaiko Stadium is the finishing point of the race
- Date: Early November
- Location: Athens, Greece
- Event type: Road
- Distance: Marathon
- Primary sponsor: OPAP
- Established: 1972 (54 years ago)
- Course records: Men: 2:10:34 (2023) (Kenya) Edwin Kiptoo; Women: 2:31:06 (2010) (Lithuania) Rasa Drazdauskaitė
- Website: Athens Classic Marathon
- Participants: 17,041 finishers (2024)

The Athens Classic Marathon is an annual marathon road race held in Athens, Greece, normally in early November (the second Sunday of November), since 1972. It also often serves as Greece's national marathon championships. The race attracted 43,000 competitors in 2015 of which 16,000 were for the 42.195 kilometre (26.2 mile) course, both numbers being an all-time record for the event. The rest of the runners competed in the concurrent 5 and 10 kilometres road races and the racewalking contest.

The marathon race and course is inspired by the Ancient Athenian army run from Marathon to Athens after the Battle of Marathon.

Taking from the tradition of the Olympic Torch, the race features the Marathon Flame, which is lit at the Tomb of the Battle of Marathon and carried to the stadium in Marathon before the beginning of each race. In addition, an international marathon symposium is held the day before the race.

Greek competitors have traditionally been strong in the men's and women's competitions. However, East Africans and Japanese runners have increasingly become the dominant runners from 1999 onwards. The current course records are 2:10:34 hours for men, set by Edwin Kiptoo in 2023, while Rasa Drazdauskaitė's run of 2:31:06 in 2010 is the quickest by a woman on the course.

== History ==
The provenance of the competitive race is traced back to the Marathon race at the 1896 Olympics.

A separate race from the town of Marathon to Athens was regularly held in April from 1955 to at least 1989. This unrelated race, known as the Athens Marathon, frequently served as the Greek championship race but it is now discontinued.

The Athens Classic Marathon began in 1972 as a joint venture between the Greek tourist board and athletics association.

In 1982, the organisers dedicated the race to Grigoris Lambrakis, an athlete and Member of the Greek Parliament, whose murder in the 1960s has become an inspirational cause for advocates of human rights.

The race came under the auspices of the current organisers and SEGAS in 1983 and has since become a major race, being awarded Gold Label Road Race status by the IAAF. The 1983 event was known as the Athens Peace Marathon and both a popular and elite level race featured for the first time that year.

Since 1990, the Athens Classic Marathon has often served as the Greek national championships for the marathon event.

Since 2007 the Association of International Marathons and Distance Races has organised an annual International Marathon Symposium in Marathon town the day prior to the race.

The 2010 edition of the event was combined with the celebration of the 2500th anniversary of the Battle of Marathon. As the 2500 anniversary was actually in 2011, this year was also celebrated as the anniversary run.

In 2016, a refugee team competed in the concurrent 5 kilometre road race.

The 2020 in-person edition of the race was cancelled due to the coronavirus pandemic, with all registrants given the option of transferring their entry to 2021 or obtaining a full refund.

== Course ==
The marathon course is based on the legend from which the race gained its name: Pheidippides, a messenger in Ancient Greece, who allegedly ran from the Battle of Marathon to Athens to announce the Greeks' victory over the Persians.

It is perhaps the most difficult major marathon race: the course is uphill from the 10 km mark to the 31 km mark – the toughest uphill climb of any major marathon. The course begins in the town of Marathon, where it passes the tomb of the Athenian soldiers, and it traces a path near the coast through Nea Makri. Following the steep rise, the course goes lightly downhill towards the city of Athens. It passes a statue of a runner (Ο Δρομέας) in the city centre before finishing up at the Panathinaiko Stadium; a site for athletics competitions in ancient times and the finishing point for both the 1896 and 2004 Olympic marathons.

== Past winners ==
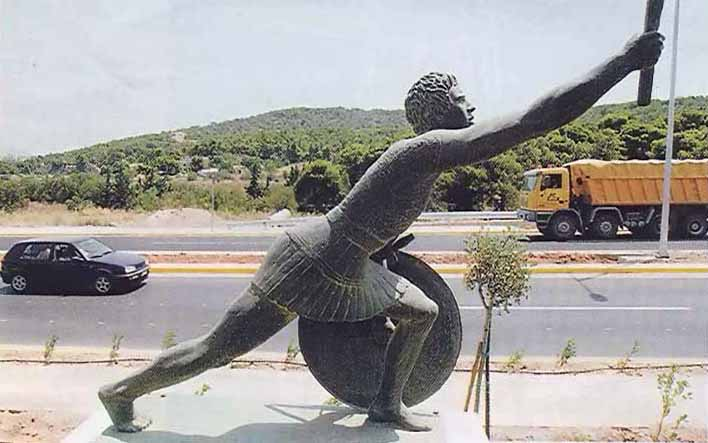
A statue of Pheidippides on the route from Marathon to Athens

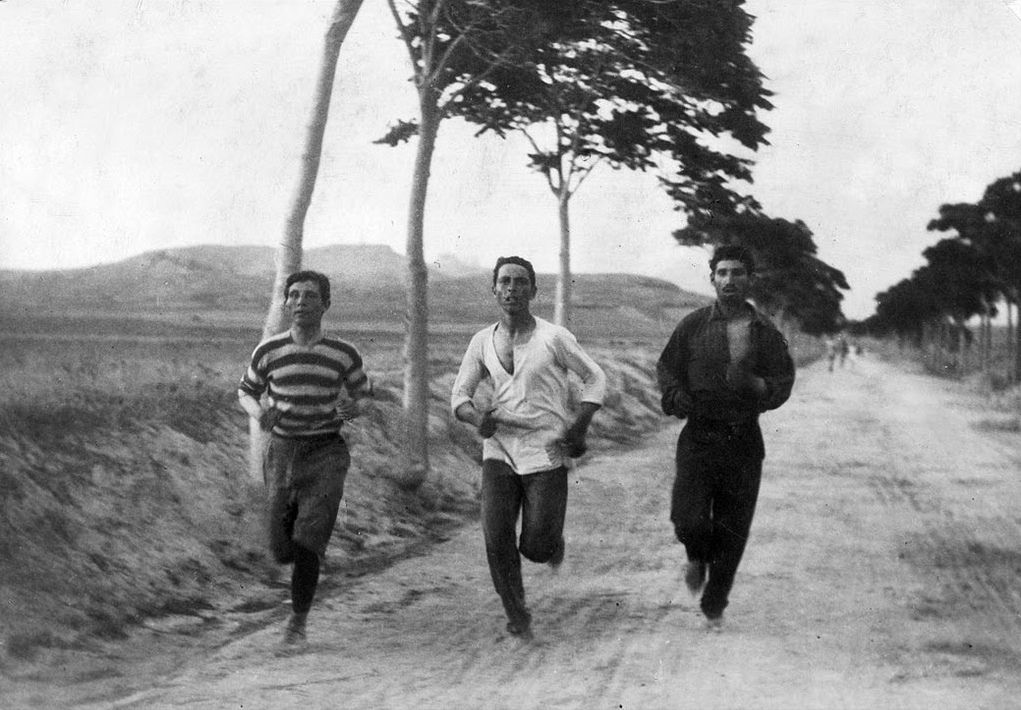
Burton Holmes' photograph entitled "1896: Three athletes in training for the marathon at the Olympic Games in Athens". The 1896 Olympic Marathon was the precursor to the Athens Classic Marathon.

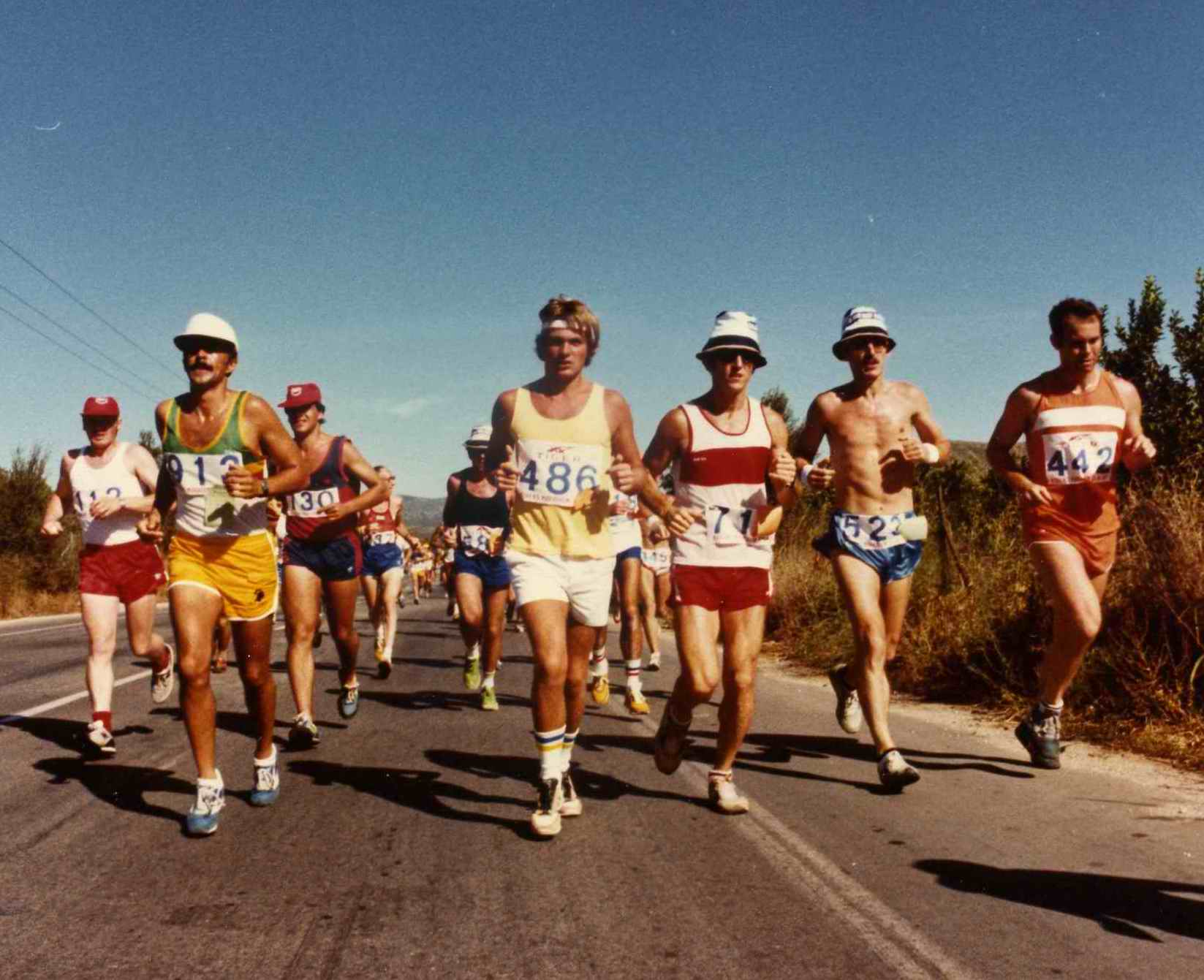
Runners competing in the 1980 Athens Marathon, won by Jean-Paul Didim

Key: Course record Greek championship race

Year	Men's winner	Time (h:m:s)	Women's winner	Time (h:m:s)
2026	Manazot Siyum Taferi (ETH)	2:10:03	Yatane Kormoshe Dusha (ETH)	2:30:04
2025	Panagiotis Karaiskos (GRE)	2:20:10	Stamatia Noula (GRE)	2:39:28
2024	Charalampos Pitsolis (GRE)	2:18:56	Stamatia Noula (GRE)	2:40:20
2023	Edwin Kiptoo (KEN)	2:10:34	Soukaina Atanane (MAR)	2:31:52
2022	Charalampos Pitsolis (GRE)	2:23:44	Vasiliki Konstantinopoulou (GRE)	2:46:01
2021	Konstantinos Gkelaouzos (GRE)	2:16:49	Gloria Privileggio (GRE)	2:41:30
2020	cancelled due to coronavirus pandemic			
2019	John Komen (KEN)	2:16:34	Eleftheria Petroulaki (GRE)	2:45:50
2018	Brimin Kipkorir (KEN)	2:10:56	Shelmith Nyawira (KEN)	2:36:46
2017	Samuel Kalalei (KEN)	2:12:17	Bedatu Hirpa (ETH)	2:34:18
2016	Luka Rotich (KEN)	2:12:49	Nancy Arusei (KEN)	2:38:13
2015	Christoforos Merousis (GRE)	2:21:22	Minori Hayakari (JPN)	2:52:06
2014	Felix Kandie (KEN)	2:10:37	Naomi Maiyo (KEN)	2:41:06
2013	Hillary Yego (KEN)	2:13:51	Nancy Rotich (KEN)	2:41:32
2012	Raymond Bett (KEN)	2:11:35	Consalater Yadaa (KEN)	2:40:00
2011	Abdelkrim Boubker (MAR)	2:11:40	Elfeneshe Melkamu (ETH)	2:35:25
2010	Raymond Bett (KEN)	2:12:40	Rasa Drazdauskaitė (LTU)	2:31:06
2009	Josephat Ngetich (KEN)	2:13:44	Akemi Ozaki (JPN)	2:39:56
2008	Paul Lekuraa (KEN)	2:12:42	Mai Tagami (JPN)	2:36:58
2007	Benjamin Korir (KEN)	2:14:40	Svetlana Ponomarenko (RUS)	2:33:19
2006	Henry Tarus (KEN)	2:17:46	Chikako Ogushi (JPN)	2:40:45
2005	James Saina (KEN)	2:16:15	Sisay Measo (ETH)	2:38:39
2004	Frederick Cherono (KEN)	2:15:28	Alemu Zinash (ETH)	2:41:11
2003	Zebedayo Bayo (TAN)	2:16:59	Nadezhda Wijenberg (NED)	2:43:18
2002	Mark Saina (KEN)	2:18:20	Sonja Oberem (GER)	2:37:29
2001	Noah Bor (KEN)	2:19:26	Sonja Oberem (GER)	2:36:15
2000	Nikólaos Poliás (GRE)	2:20:50	Yeoryía Abatzídou (GRE)	2:53:00
1999	Masato Yonehara (JPN)	2:18:35	Tamaki Okuno (JPN)	2:46:46
1998	Nikólaos Poliás (GRE)	2:18:38	Joy Smith (USA)	2:50:52
1997	Gerasimos Kokotos (GRE)	2:31:47	Melissa Hurta (USA)	2:54:43
1996	Nikitas Markakis (GRE)	2:33:15	Panagiota Petropoulou (GRE)	2:56:42
1995	Nikólaos Poliás (GRE)	2:27:27	Panagiota Nikolakopoulou (GRE)	2:59:45
1994	Christos Dumas (GRE)	2:27:27	Kleri Stavropoulou (GRE)	3:21:32
1993	Nikólaos Poliás (GRE)	2:28:12	Panagiota Petropoulou (GRE)	3:15:56
1992	Christos Dumas (GRE)	2:31:15	Reiko Hirosawa (JPN)	3:05:24
1991	Theodoros Fotopoulos (GRE)	2:28:18	Sofia Sotiriadou (GRE)	2:59:29
1990	Johan Engholm (SWE)	2:26:33	Prudence Taylor (NZL)	2:59:15
1989	Jan van Rijthoven (NED)	2:23:19	Leslie Lewis (USA)	2:37:42
1988	Fedor Ryzhov (URS)	2:17:33	Magdalini Poulimenou (GRE)	2:50:59
1987	Kevin Flanegan (RSA)	2:25:14	Irina Bogacheva (URS)	2:43:37
1986	Jos vander Water (BEL)	2:27:22	Signe Ward (NOR)	3:06:58
1985	Michael Hill (SWE)	2:26:20	Eryl Davies (GBR)	3:04:30
1984	Leon Swanepoel (RSA)	2:28:53	Barbara Balzer (USA)	2:58:30
1983	Martin J. McCarthy (GBR)	2:25:34	Hanne Jensen (DEN)	3:20:33
1982	Rick Callison (USA)	2:27:29	Ella Grimm (DEN)	3:07:41
1981	Yiannis Kouros (GRE)	2:32:50	Britta Sorensen (DEN)	3:16:00
1980	Jean-Paul Didim (FRA)	2:34:32	Arlene Volmer (USA)	3:17:07
1979	Richard Belk (GBR)	2:31:21	Gaby Birrer (SUI)	3:34:21
1978	Danny Flynn (AUS)	2:27:22	Alexandra Fili (GRE)	4:47:00
1977	Kebede Balcha (ETH)	2:14:40.8	Christina Johansson (SWE)	3:05:53
1976	Edgar Friedli (SUI)	2:33:50	Melissa Hendriksen (USA)	3:35:45
1975	Teofanis Tsimingatos (GRE)	2:35:39	Corrie Konings (NED)	3:16:13
1974	Ian Thompson (GBR)	2:13.50	Eva-Maria Westphal (FRG)	3:55:56
1973	Jouko Kuha (FIN)	2:32:26	No women's race	
1972	Yiannis Virvilis (GRE)	2:26:26	No women's race	

== Statistics ==
=== Winners by country ===
Country	Men's race	Women's race	Total
Greece	17	13	30
Kenya	16	5	21
Ethiopia	3	5	8
United States	1	6	7
Japan	1	6	7
United Kingdom	3	1	4
Denmark	0	3	3
Germany	0	3	3
Netherlands	1	2	3
Sweden	2	1	3
Morocco	1	1	2
South Africa	2	0	2
Switzerland	1	1	2
Soviet Union	1	1	2
Australia	1	0	1
Belgium	1	0	1
Finland	1	0	1
France	1	0	1
Lithuania	0	1	1
Norway	0	1	1
New Zealand	0	1	1
Russia	0	1	1
Tanzania	1	0	1
Total	54	53	107

=== Multiple winners ===
Athlete	Country	Wins	Years
Teofanis Tsimingatos	Greece	2	1974, 1975
Christos Dumas	Greece	2	1992, 1994
Nikolaos Polias	Greece	4	1993, 1995, 1998, 2000
Panagiota Petropoulou	Greece	2	1993, 1996
Sonja Oberem	Germany	2	2001, 2002
Raymond Bett	Kenya	2	2010, 2012
Charalampos Pitsolis	Greece	2	2022, 2024
Stamatia Noula	Greece	2	2024, 2025

=== Attendance ===
No.	Year	42 km. registrations	42 km. finishers	Total registrations
20th	2002	?	1.779	?
21st	2003	?	2.676	?
22nd	2004	?	2.868	?
23rd	2005	?	2.559	?
24th	2006	3.073	2.626	?
25th	2007	?	3.438	7.000
26th	2008	?	3.846	10.000
27th	2009	?	3.855	?
28th	2010	?	10.371	20.000
29th	2011	9.000	6.144	17.500
30th	2012	9.500	6.470	26.000
31st	2013	?	8.500	31.000
32nd	2014	13.000	10.480	35.000
33rd	2015	16.000	11.886	43.000
34th	2016	18.000	13.707	50.000
35th	2017	18.500	14.743	51.000
36th	2018	18.750	15.292	55.000
37th	2019	>20.000	16.439	>60.000
38th	2020	—	—	—
38th	2021	?	7.518	?
39th	2022	15.000*	12.516	45.000*
40th	2023	?	17.060	70.000*
41st	2024	?	17.030*	74.000*
42nd	2025	24.000	19.104	78.000*
