= Porto Half Marathon =

Road running event in Portugal

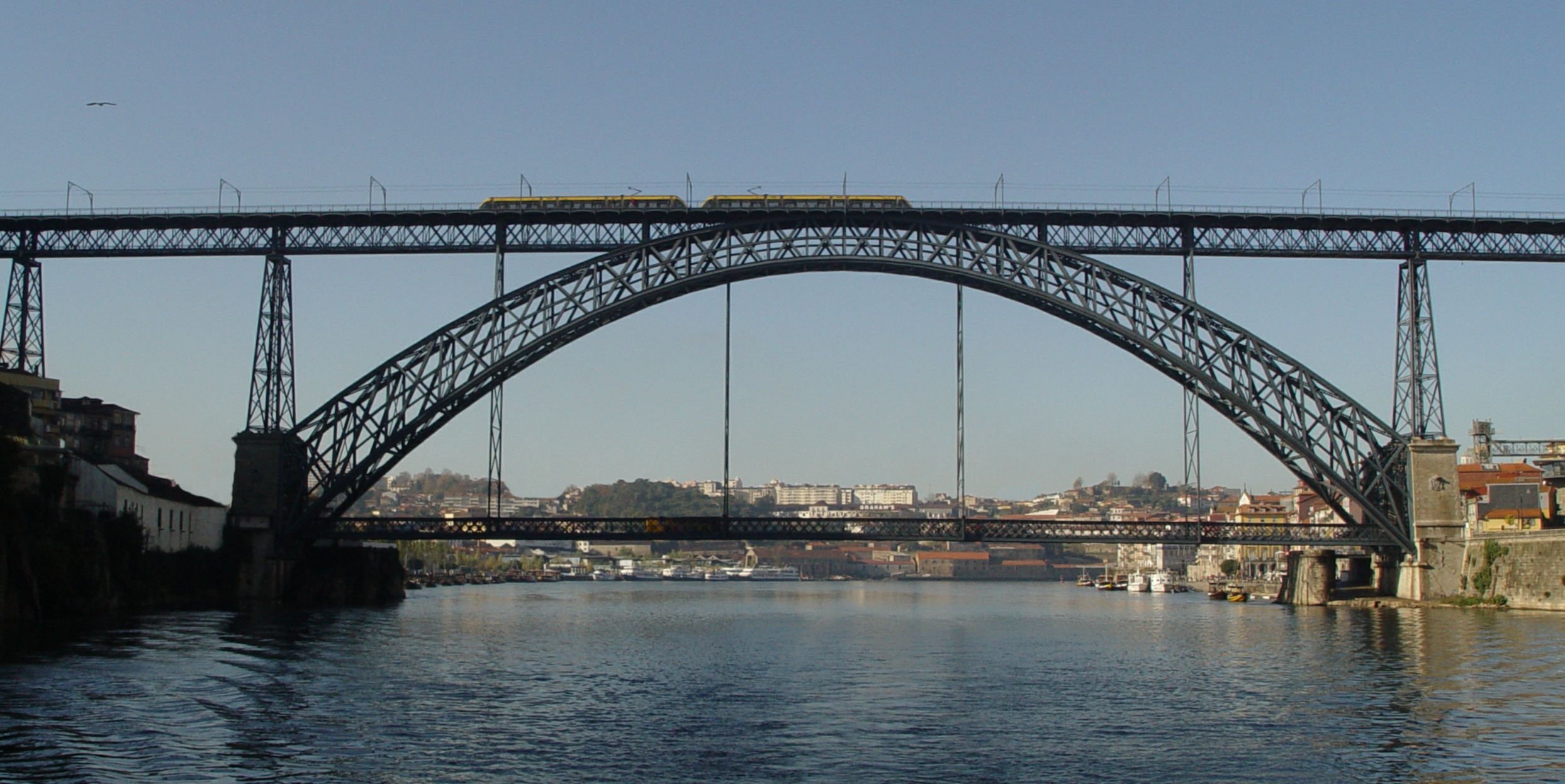
- The race crosses the River Douro over Dom Luís Bridge
- Date: Mid September
- Location: Porto—Vila Nova de Gaia; Portugal
- Event type: Road
- Distance: Half marathon
- Primary sponsor: Hyundai
- Established: 2007
- Course records: Men's: 59:30 (2011) (Eritrea) Zersenay Tadese; Women's: 1:07:13 (2024) (Ethiopia) Enatnesh Tirusew
- Website: Official website
- Participants: 2,461 finishers (2021); 3,791 (2019)

The Porto Half Marathon (Portuguese: Meia-Maratona do Porto) is an annual half marathon road running event held in Porto, Portugal which follows the River Douro. Known as the Hyundai Porto Half Marathon for sponsorship reasons, the inaugural edition was held in 2007 and it typically takes place every mid-September.

The competition attracts top level elite athletes, mainly East African and Portuguese. Since its inception, all the men's and women's races have been won by East African competitors. Among those to top the men's podium are Olympic champions Haile Gebrselassie and Samuel Wanjiru, while former world champion over 10,000 metres, Berhane Adere, was the 2010 women's winner.

Zersenay Tadese holds the men's course record with his time of 59:30 minutes, set in 2011. Pamela Chepchumba (two-time winner) set the women's course record of 1:10:24 hours in 2009.

The half marathon course begins near Freixo Bridge and heads westwards, passing Cais de Gaia and Afurada before turning back on itself. It goes east, crossing the Douro over Dom Luís Bridge and again loops back once the route reaches the area near Freixo Bridge again. The course heads west towards the mouth of the Douro, going past Miragaia and finishing in the Jardim do Calém - Fluvial. In addition to the main half marathon event, there is a smaller 6 km mini-marathon which goes from Freixo Bridge to the Jardim do Calém - Fluvial.

The race is one of three major annual running events organised in Porto by Run Porto, alongside the Porto Marathon and the São Silvestre do Porto.

== Past winners ==
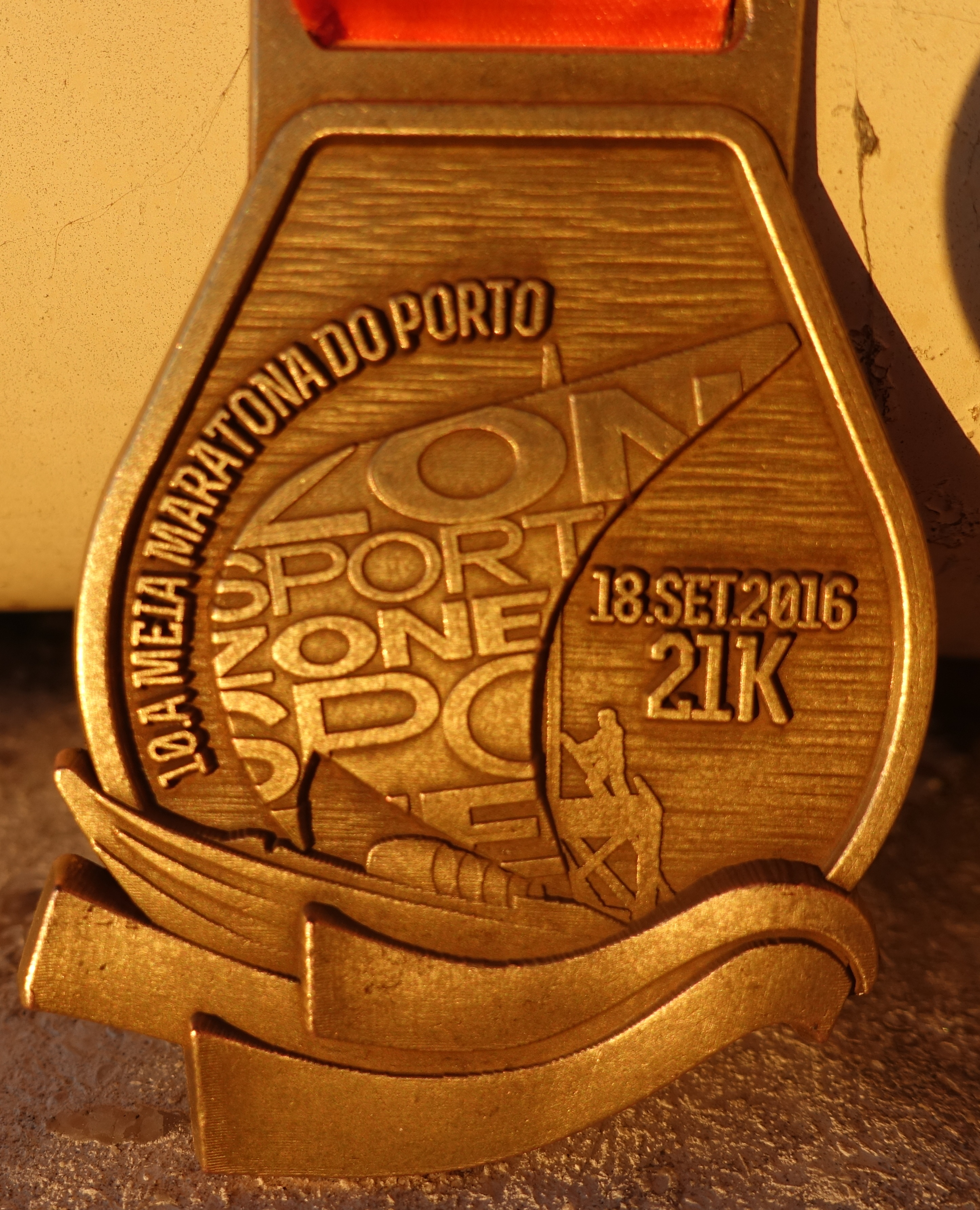

Key: Course record

Edition	Year	Men's winner	Time (h:m:s)	Women's winner	Time (h:m:s)
1st	2007	Jonathan Kipkorir (KEN)	1:01:39	Lenah Cheruiyot (KEN)	1:11:23
2nd	2008	Samuel Wanjiru (KEN)	1:01:24	Pamela Chepchumba (KEN)	1:10:26
3rd	2009	Haile Gebrselassie (ETH)	1:00:04	Pamela Chepchumba (KEN)	1:10:24
4th	2010	Stephen Kibet (KEN)	1:00:09	Berhane Adere (ETH)	1:13:49
5th	2011	Zersenay Tadese (ERI)	59:30	Doris Changeywo (KEN)	1:10:36
6th	2012	Benson Barus (KEN)	1:01:44	Alice Mogire (KEN)	1:10:23
7th	2013	Samuel Ndungu (KEN)	1:01:48	Mercy Kibarus (KEN)	1:11:11
8th	2014	Bernard Kipyego (KEN)	1:00:38	Purity Rionoripo (KEN)	1:10:40
9th	2015	Emmanuel Bor (KEN)	1:01:06	Monica Jepkoech (KEN)	1:10:26
10th	2016	Daniel Rotich (UGA)	1:00:59	Nao Isaka (JPN)	1:12:12
11th	2017	Abraham Kiptum (KEN)	1:00:06	Monica Jepkoech (KEN)	1:09:23
12th	2018	Mike Kiptum (KEN)	1:00:53	Susan Kipsang (KEN)	1:11:06
13th	2019	Maxwell Rotich (UGA)	1:01:14	Antonina Kwambai (KEN)	1:09:42
14th	2021	Luís Saraiva (POR)	1:03:11	Solange Jesús (POR)	1:15:43
15th	2022	Emmanuel Bor (KEN)	1:00:38	Senayet Getachew (ETH)	1:08:37
16th	2023	Antony Kimtai (KEN)	1:01:39	Enatnesh Tirusew (ETH)	1:07:13
17th	2024	Gilbert Kibet (KEN)	1:00:26	Cynthia Chemweno (KEN)	1:09:58
