= Japhet Kosgei =

Kenyan long-distance runner

Japhet Kosgei (born 20 December 1968) is a retired long-distance runner from Kenya, who won several marathons during his career, including the 1999 edition of the Rotterdam Marathon and 2006 Belgrade Marathon. His personal best is 2:07:09. He won the Lisbon Half Marathon 1999.

== Achievements ==
Year	Competition	Venue	Position	Event	Notes
Representing Kenya
1998	Venice Marathon	Venice, Italy	1st	Marathon	2:11:27
1999	Rotterdam Marathon	Rotterdam, Netherlands	1st	Marathon	2:07:09
1999	Lisbon Half Marathon	Lisbon, Portugal	1st	Half marathon	1:00.01
2000	Tokyo Marathon	Tokyo, Japan	1st	Marathon	2:07:15
2001	New York City Marathon	New York, United States	2nd	Marathon	2:09:19
2003	Lake Biwa Marathon	Ōtsu, Japan	1st	Marathon	2:07:39
2006	Belgrade Marathon	Belgrade, Serbia and Montenegro	1st	Marathon	2:10:54
