= Anastasia Ndereba =

Kenyan long-distance runner

Anastasia Ndereba (born 27 September 1974) is a Kenyan long-distance runner. She is the sister of the more renowned athlete and Olympic medalist Catherine Ndereba.

Her first recorded professional competition was on 6 November 1999, when she completed the 8 km Senior Women's Cross-country race organised by the KAAA, where she finished 4th in a time of 34 minutes and 32 seconds. She debuted as an IAAF athlete officiated by the IAAF in 2001, when she competed in the 3,000 women's B category at Rieti Meeting in Rieti, Italy and emerged 7th with a time of 9 minutes, 12.95 seconds.

In 2003, Anastasia compete and lost against her sister in the 10,000 km KAAA race in Kenya. Her sister beat Anastasia by less than a tenth of a second after she clocked 34:35.0 to Anastasia's 34:35.6 in front of a huge crowd in Ruring'u Stadium, in Nyeri, Kenya.

== KAA competitions ==
Anastasia Ndereba competed in several KAAA tournaments earlier in her career. In 06 Nov 1999, she competed in the 8 kilometer cross-country race, in which she emerged 4th with a time of 34 minutes and 32 seconds. This race was organised in Nairobi, Kenya and put her on the forefront to be selected for other competitions. On 24 December the same year, she competed in a similar race titled 'KAAA Energiser Crosscountry' in Machakos, Kenya, improving her time by 7 minutes to 27 minutes and 32 seconds. However, she placed 5th in this race. On 25 March 2000, she won her first major competition at the 10 km KAAA Meeting tournament in Nyeri, in which she finished first with a time of 36:06.70, earning her a first opportunity to compete in an international platform in the United States.

== USA competitions ==
Between 15 April 2000 and 27 August 2000, Anastasia competed in 12 athletic competitions in the United States winning one of them and emerging second runner's up in a further three. On 15 April 2000, she competed in a 5 km version of the Cherry Blossom race at Cherry Hill, in which she placed second with a time of 16 minutes and 23 seconds. On May 7, 2000, she competed in the Blue Shield Broad Street Run in Philadelphia, United States. This was a 10-mile road race and her first major win internationally after she finished in first position in a time of 57 minutes and ten seconds. Her last major race in the USA during this period was race in Avlon, NJ, in which she emerged 4th after a consecutive series of no win races throughout the month and since May. She soon travelled back to Kenya and resumed KAAA competitions.

In February, 2001, she competed in the Yokohama International Women's Ekiden in Yokohama, Japan. in a 5 km road race and emerged 5th with a time of 16 minutes and 31 seconds. Six months later, she was second in the Alpicella-Monte Beigua competition, which was a 10.6 km race that she finished in 57 minutes. On 9 September 2001, she was the third to finish the European Interclub Championships for Women race in Salò, Italy, with a time of 51 minutes and 34 seconds.

== IAAF and debut in Half marathon and Marathon competitions ==
Anastasia made her debut in Half Marathon when she competed in the Torino Half Marathon, in Turin, Italy on 23 September 2001. She won this race with a time of 1:12:36.

In April 2002, Anastasia made her debut in the Turin Marathon in Turin, Italy. She won this race after placing a time of 2:29:27. Four months later, she won the Lille Métropole half marathon in Villeneuve-d'Ascq, France. She did this in 1:11:45. A month later, on 22 September 2002, she won the Turin Half marathon with a time of 1:12:09, improving her personal best on the track from the previous year.

On 27 October 2002, she debuted in the Venezia Marathon in Venice, Italy. She won this race with a time of 2:29:03. This record surpassed her marathon record of 2:29:27 set in Turin earlier that year. From there, her performance declined noticeably throughout the year and the next.

On 3 May 2003, Anastasia participated in the Indianapolis Life 500 Festival half marathon in Indianapolis, United States. She emerged second in a time of 1:11:59, four minutes more than her time in the Lile half marathon the previous year. In 1 Jun 2003, she participated in Suzuki Rock 'N' Roll marathon in San Diego, United States. She emerged fourth with a time of 2:30:53. Her subsequent races in the United States were in Dacenport, Falmouth, Flint, Park Forest, Philadelphia and Chicago between July and October. She placed 9th, 14, 9th, 6th, 8th and 11th positions respectively in these races before returning to Kenya.

Anastasia returned to the United States in May 2004 and on 8 May, she participated in the Indianapolis Life 500 Festival half marathon. She took the sixth position in a time of 1:16:16. She improved this time in the Vancouver half marathon 7 weeks later in Vancouver, Canada, where she clocked 1:15:41 to take the second position. Five weeks later, on August 15, she further improved this time by 10 seconds to take the second position in the America's Finest City half marathon in San Diego with a time of 1:15:31. After registering a weak performance in the Rock 'n' Roll half marathon in Virginia Beach, Virginia, where she emerged 8th overall, she went ahead to win the Beirut marathon in a time of 2:36 minutes and 46 seconds. Her final major race that year was back home in Kenya, in which she was number seven in the Nyeri half marathon in an undocumented time.

In 2005, Anastasia competed in 4 half marathons and 2 marathons around the world. She won one marathon, the Toronto Waterfront Marathon in Toronto, Canada, with a time of 2:36:30.8; and the Safaricom half marathon in Nyeri, Kenya, with a time of 1:18:26. She further emerged second in two of them, the America's Finest City half marathon, at 1:16:01; and The Stone Harbor Lions Runwon none of them.

In 2006, Anastasia had three major races, two of them marathons. These were the Osaka International Women's in Osaka, Japan and the Hokkaido marathon in Sapporo, Japan. She finished 8th and 9th in a time of 2:32:47 and 2:45:52 respectively for the first and second races. She then went on a hiatus for four years, returning again in 2010.

When she returned in 2010, Anastasia participated in the Standard Chartered Nairobi marathon in Nairobi, Kenya and the Standard Chartered Mumbai marathon in Mumbai, India in 2010 and 2011 respectively, she performed dismally in both races, taking the 12th and 13th positions with a time of more than 2 hours and 47 minutes in both. She improved her time in the 2012 Nagano Olympic Commemorative marathon of 2012 when she clocked 2:43:33 and became the 9th athlete to finish the race.
