= Lamech Mokono =

Kenyan long-distance runner

Medal record

Men's athletics

Representing Kenya

IAAF World Half Marathon Championships
Gold medal – first place	2008 Rio	Team

Lamech Mosotoi Mokono (born April 7, 1981) is a long-distance runner from Kenya who was a member of the team that won gold at the World Athletics 2008 Half Marathon Championship in Rio de Janeiro, Brazil. He won several races, including the 2013 Victoria Marathon in Victoria, Canada.

== Professional career ==
Mokono, 5-foot-11, 128 pounds, faced stiff competition in his third marathon race in on the North Shore of Lake Superior in Minnesota. He took the lead from three-time Houston Marathon-winner David Cheruiyot the 12.5 mile marker in the 32nd Grandma's Marathon (in 2008) race in Duluth. He finished the race just five seconds ahead of second-place finisher David Tuwei. He was the eighth Kenyan to win the race, and he did so while wearing bib number 6, which was also worn by the 2007 winner Wesley Ngetich, who had been shot with a poison arrow and killed after he returned to Kenya amidst political unrest.

In 2008 Mokono ran ten races, including the Rock 'n' Roll Arizona Marathon earlier in January, where he placed fifth behind winner Michael Aish. He ran several other races throughout the United States of America and Brazil that year. One of them resulted in a quirky finish. Mokono tied for first place with fellow Kenyan Valentine Orare at the OneAmerica 500 Festival Mini-Marathon. Both men finished the half-marathon at 1 hour, 2 minutes, 53 seconds. After deliberation that included checking finish photos, multiple video angles, and spectator photos, they were both awarded first place—and the $3,500 prize.

Mokono was one of five Kenyan men who ran the 2008 IAAF World Half Marathon Championships. The Kenyan men's team (which included Patrick Makau Musyoki, who took second, Stephen Kipkoech Kibiwott, Joseph Maregu, and Mekubo Mogusu) took the gold, with Mokono finishing in 1:08:49.

Another good year for him was 2012. In Canada, runners from Kenya took the lead in the Montreal Marathon, and as the pack split up, Mokono battled for second place.

== Achievements ==
Year	Competition	Venue	Position	Event	Notes
2008	World Half Marathon Championships	Rio de Janeiro	54th	Half marathon	1:08:49
2008	World Half Marathon Championships	Rio de Janeiro	1st	Team	3:07:24
