= Lille Half Marathon =

Annual foot race in Lille, France

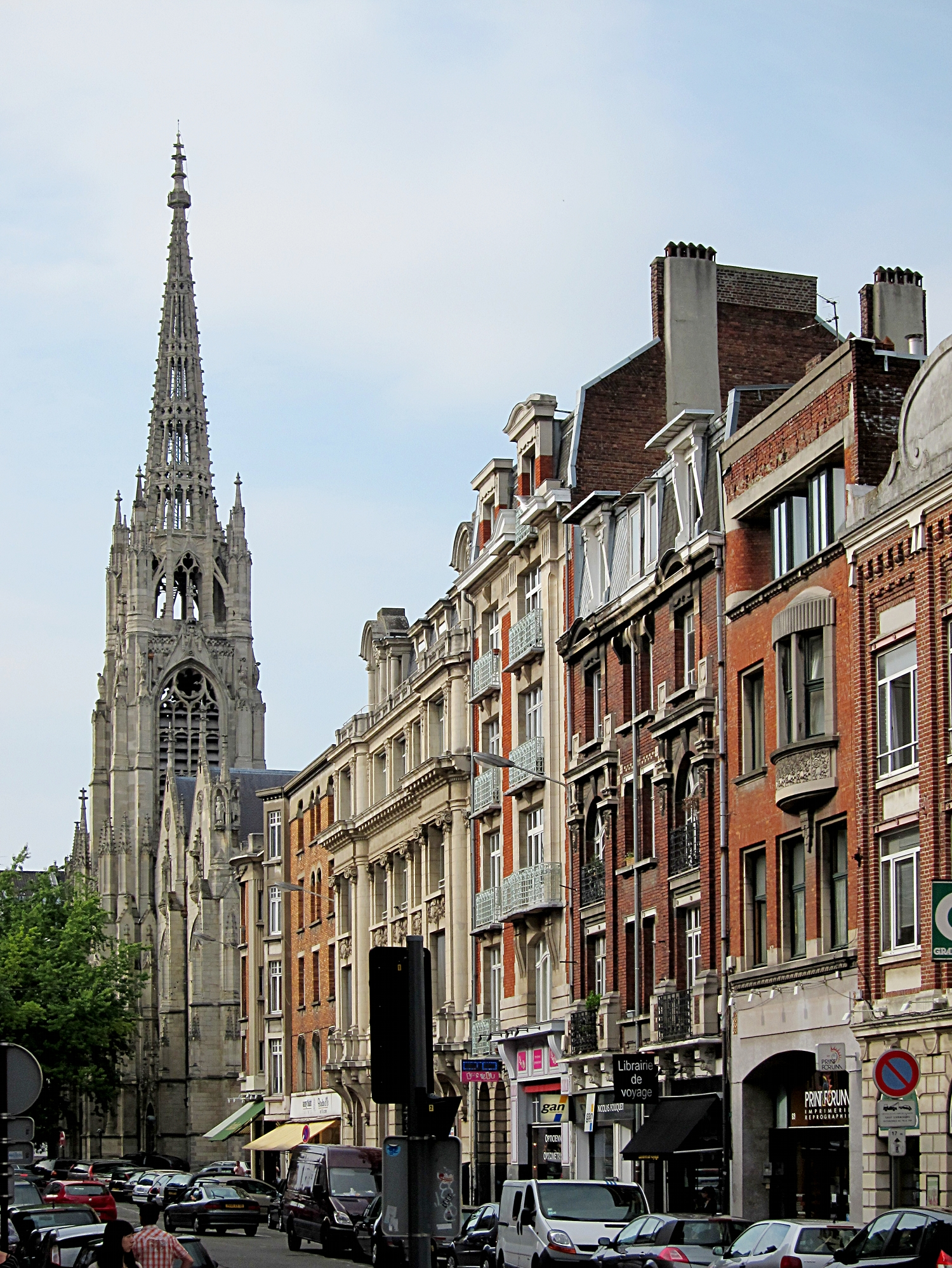
- Rue de Paris in Lille – near the finishing point of the race
- Date: Late March
- Location: Lille, France
- Event type: Road
- Distance: Half marathon
- Established: 1986
- Course records: Men's: 59:05 (2012) (Kenya) Ezekiel Chebii; Women's: 1:06:57 (2022) (Ethiopia) Zenebu Fikadu
- Website: Lille Half Marathon
- Participants: 3,157 finishers (2018); 2,739 finishers (2019); 2,621 finishers (2022)

The Lille Métropole Half Marathon (French: Semi-Marathon de Lille Métropole) is an annual half marathon foot race which takes place in Lille, France, in early September. First organised by the Association de Promotion des Événements Lillois in 1986, the race began as a marathon event before switching to the shorter distance in 1996. The course of the race begins in the Boulevard de la Liberté and finishes at the front of Lille's city hall on Rue de Paris.

The French Half Marathon Championships were held concurrently with the final edition of the marathon race in 1995. Bruno Leger was the men's winner with a time of 1:02:31 while Christine Mallo took the women's title in 1:12:05. The half marathon race has delivered some fast winning times – the 2009 race saw the top three men run under an hour and Mary Keitany ran the seventh quickest run ever to become the women's race winner. The men's course record of 59:05, set by Ezekiel Chebii in 2012, is the fastest ever recorded for the distance in France.

In addition to the half and full marathon, the Lille Half Marathon also hosted an elite 5K run and 10K run starting in 2023.

== Past winners ==
Key: Course record

=== Marathon ===
Edition	Year	Men's winner	Time (h:m:s)	Women's winner	Time (h:m:s)
1st	1986	Jacques Boxberger (FRA)	2:14:16	Chantal Langlacé (FRA)	2:33:58
2nd	1987	Luis Soares (FRA)	2:14:41	Chantal Langlacé (FRA)	2:41:43
3rd	1988	Helmuth Stuhlpfarrer (AUT)	2:13:08	Fabiola Oppliger (COL)	2:42:25
4th	1989	Jean-Pierre Pietrement (FRA)	2:14:11	Brigitte Olive (FRA)	2:45:15
5th	1990	Alexandre Rachide (FRA)	2:14:51	Fabiola Oppliger (COL)	2:37:46
6th	1991	Elisio Rios (POR)	2:17:45	Lutsia Belyayeva (RUS)	2:42:38
7th	1992	Gyula Borka (HUN)	2:13:15	Lutsia Belyayeva (RUS)	2:35:46
8th	1993	Csaba Szűcs (HUN)	2:14:24	Alevtina Naumova (RUS)	2:36:50
9th	1994	El Hadi Moumou (FRA)	2:14:53	Lutsia Belyayeva (RUS)	2:43:55
10th	1995	Ronny Ligneel (BEL)	2:14:48	Yelena Sipatova (RUS)	2:36:21

=== Half marathon ===
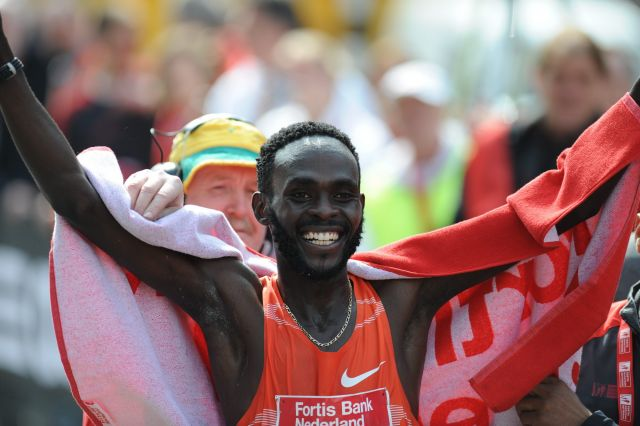
Duncan Kibet won the men's race in 2004.

Edition	Year	Men's winner	Time (h:m:s)	Women's winner	Time (h:m:s)
1st	1996	Jean-Paul Gahimbaré (BDI)	1:02:11	Annette Sergent (FRA)	1:11:21
2nd	1997	John Gwako (KEN)	1:01:10	Jackline Torori (KEN)	1:11:26
3rd	1998	Joseph Kibor (KEN)	1:01:46	Anne Njeri (KEN)	1:12:43
4th	1999	Phaustin Baha Sulle (TAN)	1:00:38	Zahia Dahmani (FRA)	1:12:38
5th	2000	Abdellah Béhar (FRA)	1:01:30	Nuța Olaru (ROM)	1:11:08
6th	2001	Driss El Himer (FRA)	1:02:08	Hafida Gadi (FRA)	1:13:16
7th	2002	Robert Cheboror (KEN)	1:01:42	Anastasia Ndereba (KEN)	1:11:45
8th	2003	Wilson Onsare (KEN)	1:00:52	Magdaline Chemjor (KEN)	1:09:39
9th	2004	Duncan Kibet (KEN)	1:01:01	Lenah Cheruiyot (KEN)	1:10:15
10th	2005	James Theuri (KEN)	1:00:54	Merima Denboba (ETH)	1:11:37
11th	2006	Joseph Maregu (KEN)	1:01:20	Meriem Wangari (KEN)	1:11:36
12th	2007	Joseph Maregu (KEN)	59:45	Mary Keitany (KEN)	1:08:43
13th	2008	Tilahun Regassa (ETH)	59:36	Tigist Tufa (ETH)	1:11:42
14th	2009	Stephen Kibiwott (KEN)	59:37	Mary Keitany (KEN)	1:07:00
15th	2010	Wilson Kiprop (KEN)	59:34	Florence Kiplagat (KEN)	1:07:40
16th	2011	Geoffrey Kamworor (KEN)	1:00:02	Valentine Kipketer (KEN)	1:08:21
17th	2012	Ezekiel Chebii (KEN)	59:05	Flomena Chepchirchir (KEN)	1:08:06
18th	2013	Vincent Kipruto (KEN)	1:00:39	Diana Sigei (KEN)	1:10:14
19th	2014	Mark Korir (KEN)	1:00:49	Rael Kinyara (KEN)	1:09:29
20th	2015	Stephen Chebogut (KEN)	1:00:19	Peninah Arusei (KEN)	1:08:56
	2016	Did not held			
21st	2017	Vincent Kipsang (KEN)	59:27	Gladys Chesir (KEN)	1:07:49
22nd	2018	Victor Chumo (KEN)	1:00:03	Antonina Kwambai (KEN)	1:09:44
23rd	2019	Kibiwott Kandie (KEN)	59:31	Diana Kipyokei (KEN)	1:09:45
–	2020	Did not held due to COVID-19 pandemic in France.			
–	2021	Did not held due to COVID-19 pandemic in France.			
24th	2022	Andrew Kwemoi (UGA)	59:37	Zenebu Fikadu (ETH)	1:06:57

== Statistics ==
- Note: Data for half marathon race only

=== Winners by country ===
Country	Men's race	Women's race	Total
Kenya	19	17	36
France	2	3	5
Ethiopia	1	3	4
Burundi	1	0	1
Romania	0	1	1
Tanzania	1	0	1

=== Multiple winners ===
Athlete	Country	Wins	Years
Joseph Maregu	Kenya	2	2006, 2007
Mary Keitany	Kenya	2	2007, 2009
