= Getaneh =

Getaneh (Amharic: ) is a male given name of Ethiopian origin that may refer to:

- Getaneh Kebede (born 1992), Ethiopian footballer
- Getaneh Molla (born 1994), Ethiopian long-distance runner
- Genet Getaneh (born 1986), Ethiopian long-distance road runner
