= Pedro Mora =

Venezuelan long-distance runner

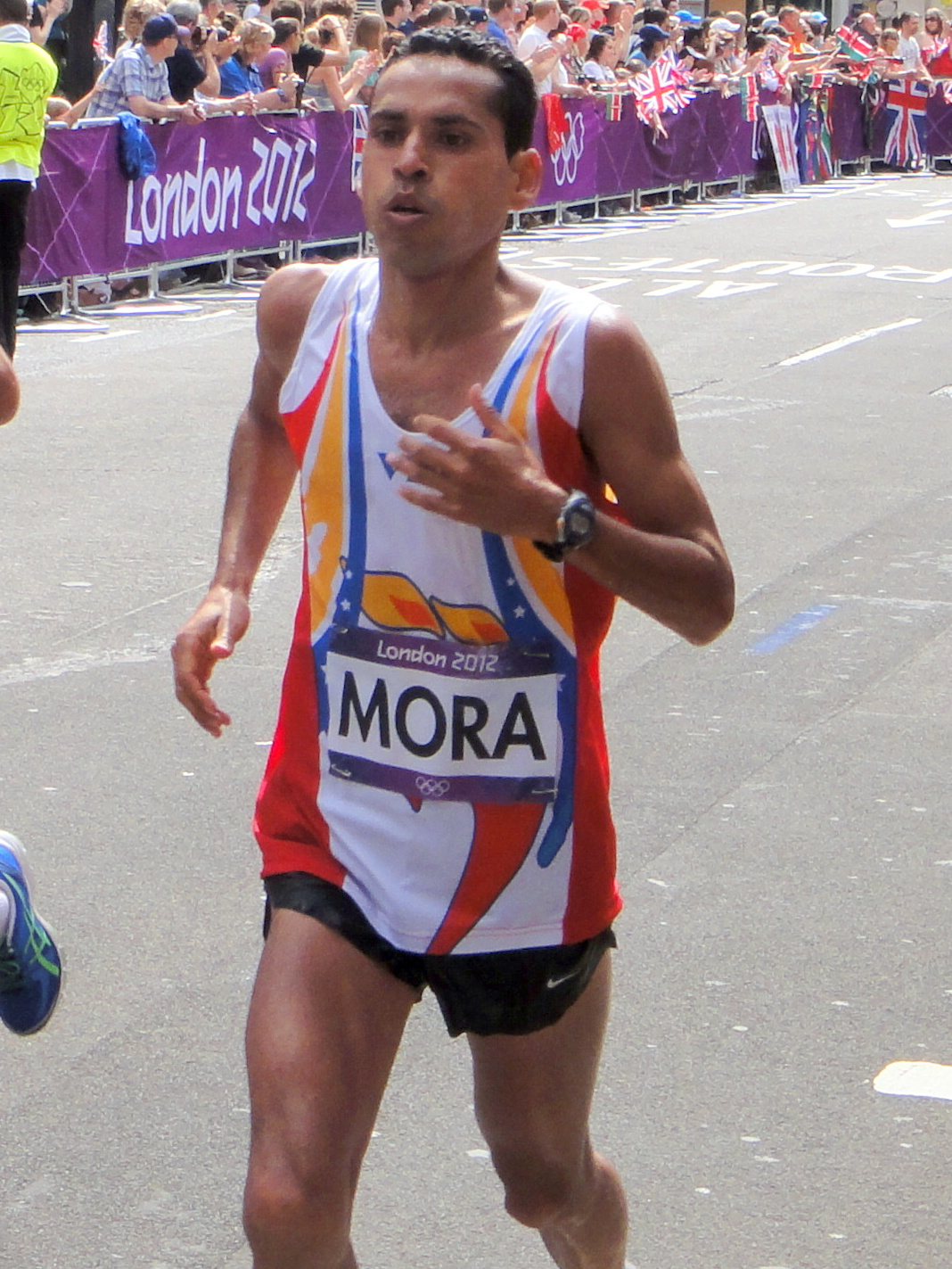
- Mora in the marathon at the 2012 Summer Olympics in London

Personal information
- Full name: Pedro Jesús Mora Suescun
- Born: 20 September 1977 (age 48) Independencia, Táchira, Venezuela
- Height: 1.69 m (5 ft 7 in)
- Weight: 55 kg (121 lb)

Sport
- Country: Venezuela
- Sport: Athletics
- Event: Marathon
- Updated on 19 December 2014

Pedro Jesús Mora Suescun (born 20 September 1977) is a Venezuelan long-distance runner. At the 2012 Summer Olympics, he competed in the Men's marathon, finishing in 62nd place.

== Personal bests ==
- 10,000m: 29:49.0 min (ht) – Caracas, Venezuela, 20 March 2009
- Half marathon: 1:03:37 hrs – Neiva, Colombia, 26 May 2001
- Marathon: 2:14:42 hrs – Duluth, United States, 18 April 2011

== Achievements ==
Year	Competition	Venue	Position	Event	Notes
Representing Venezuela
1996	South American Junior Championships	Bucaramanga, Colombia	7th	1500m	4:07.8
1996	South American Junior Championships	Bucaramanga, Colombia	7th	5000m	15:48.5
2003	World Half Marathon Championships	Vilamoura, Portugal	61st	Half marathon	1:07:39
2005	Bolivarian Games	Armenia, Colombia	6th	Half marathon	1:12:34
2008	World Half Marathon Championships	Rio de Janeiro, Brazil	17th	Half marathon	1:04:45
2008	South American Half Marathon Championships	Rio de Janeiro, Brazil	2nd	Half marathon	1:04:45
2009	South American Championships	Lima, Peru	10th	10,000m	31:49.43
2012	Olympic Games	London, United Kingdom	62nd	Marathon	2:22:40
2014	Central American and Caribbean Games	Xalapa, Mexico	7th	Marathon	2:29:48 A
