= 500 Festival Mini-Marathon =

Half marathon held in Indianapolis, Indiana, US

- OneAmerica 500 Festival Mini-Marathon logo
- Date: First Saturday in May
- Location: Indianapolis and Speedway, Indiana, United States
- Event type: Road
- Distance: Half marathon and 5K
- Primary sponsor: OneAmerica Financial Partners (half marathon); Delta Dental (5K)
- Established: May 27, 1977; 49 years ago
- Course records: Men: 1:01:44 (2023) (Kenya) Panuel Mkungo; Women: 1:07:11 (2022) (United States) Emily Sisson
- Website: www.500festival.com/mini-marathon
- Participants: 14,200+ (2023)

The 500 Festival Mini-Marathon (also known as the OneAmerica 500 Festival Mini-Marathon for sponsorship reasons) is an annual road half marathon usually held the first Saturday in May in Indianapolis, Indiana, United States.

The race began in 1977 and became an official 500 Festival event in 1979. The 13.109-mile (21.097 km) course currently starts in downtown Indianapolis, then heads west toward Speedway. It features a 2.5-mile (4.0 km) lap around the Indianapolis Motor Speedway, then returns to finish in the downtown area. From 1977 to 1992, the race was held the Friday before the Indianapolis 500. Starting in 1993, the race was moved to early May, the Saturday three weeks before the race, with rare exceptions. From 1994 to 2004, it was known as the Indianapolis Life 500 Festival Mini-Marathon.

The race regularly attracts runners and spectators from all 50 states and several countries. It includes a men's and women's running division, as well as men's and women's wheelchair entries. The Delta Dental 500 Festival 5K, a shorter version of the Mini utilizing the same start and finish lines, runs the same day. Runner's World named it among the "Most Iconic American Races" and in 2023, a USA Today readers' choice contest named it the nation's best half marathon.

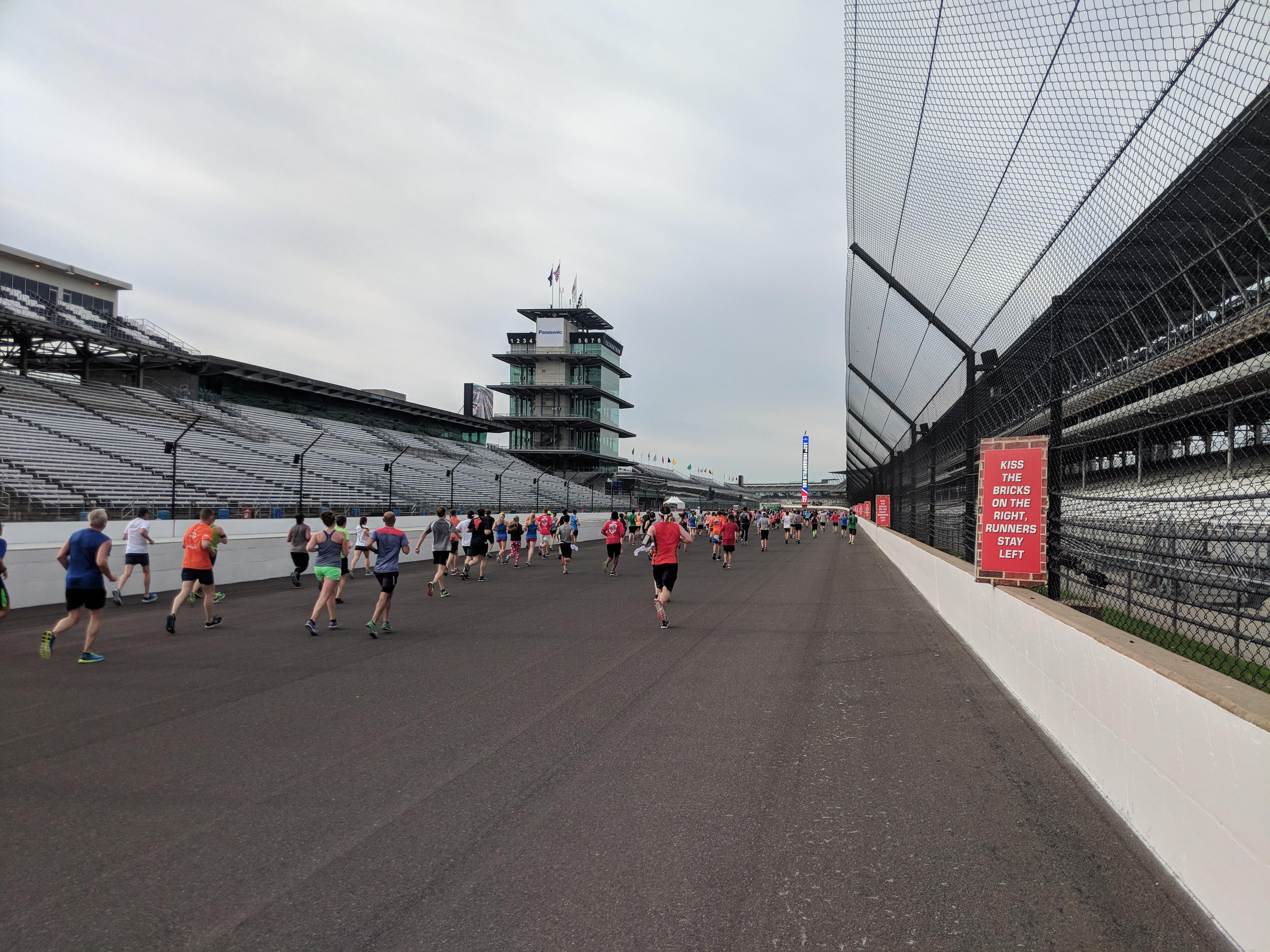
Mini-marathon runners reaching the Indianapolis Motor Speedway in 2018.

In 2020, the race was cancelled for the first time in its history, due to the coronavirus pandemic. Entrants from this year's were given invitations to the 2021 race.

== Selected history ==
=== 2008 ===
The race resulted in the closest finish ever in the history of the event: a tie. Two Kenyan runners, Lamech Mokono and Valentine Orare, were declared co-winners, extending the streak of Kenyan victories to 13. In the women's race, Janet Cherobon successfully defended her title. Tony Íñiguez became a three-time champ in the wheelchair division.

=== 2011 ===
The 2011 OneAmerica 500 Festival Mini-Marathon took place Saturday May 7, 2011. A pair of newcomers brought home the men's and women's titles in the 2011 OneAmerica 500 Festival Mini-Marathon in Indianapolis. Moroccan Ridouane Harroufi took the men's race, winning in 1:02.45, while Everlyne Lagat of Kenya captured the women's race with a time of 1:11:29, snapping the four-year win streak of fellow Kenyan Janet Cherobon-Bawcom, who took second. Adam Bleakney of Champaign, Ill., took advantage of the ideal conditions to win the wheelchair race with a blistering time of 49.18. The 2006 winner of the same race, Bleakney, a member of the 2008 U.S. Paralympics teams, was competing in Indianapolis for the first time since his previous win.

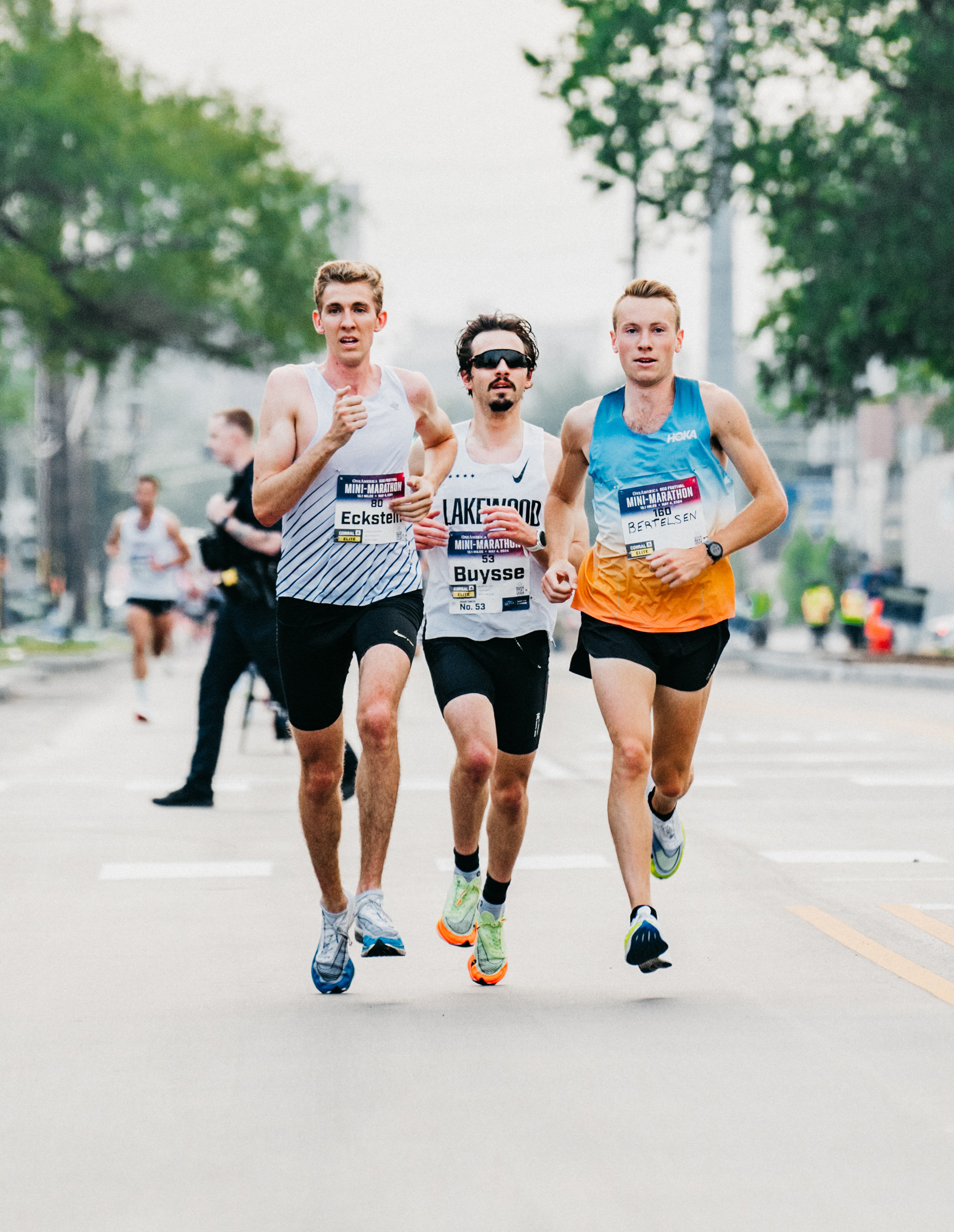
Runners at the 2 mile mark in the 2024 500 Festival Mini-Marathon

2022

In 2022 the Mini also hosted the USATF Half Marathon championships. The championship was announced a little over a month before the race and was met with heavy criticism directed toward USATF over the timing and planning of the event.

In the men's race Leonard Korir out kicked Futsum Zienasellassie, an Indianapolis native, to win by one second in a time of 1:02:35.

In the women's race Emily Sisson broke U.S. half-marathon record finishing the race in 67:11.

== Past winners ==
New course record

Date	Men's winner	Time	Women's winner	Time
May 27, 1977	Frank Shorter (USA)	1:03:56	Mary Clifford	1:31:22
May 26, 1978	Bill Rodgers (USA)	1:03:00	Miki Gorman (USA)	1:20:56
May 25, 1979	Dean Behrmann	1:09:17	Penny DeMoss	1:28:40
May 23, 1980	Eric Wood	1:08:55	Shirley Kay Durtschi	1:19:58
May 22, 1981	John Roscoe	1:06:20	Candy Wojcik	1:28:30
May 28, 1982	Greg Van Winkle	1:07:15	Marilyn Reinhardt	1:23:51
May 27, 1983	Gary Romesser	1:05:52	Marilyn Reinhardt (2)	1:23:55
May 25, 1984	Gary Romesser (2)	1:09:11	Diane Bussa	1:18:59
May 24, 1985	Gary Romesser (3)	1:07:06	Lori Veal	1:19:20
May 23, 1986	John Wellerding	1:05:48	Karen McQuilken	1:18:02
May 22, 1987	James Nolan	1:08:12	Karen McQuilken (2)	1:19:32
May 27, 1988	Gary Romesser (4)	1:08:33	Laura Didion	1:20:27
May 26, 1989	Don Johns	1:07:31	Judy Bogenschutz	1:17:59
May 25, 1990	Keith Hanson	1:04:13	Ruth Ozmun	1:18:17
May 24, 1991	Gary Romesser (5)	1:08:24	Chris Cooper	1:21:17
May 22, 1992	Andy Herr	1:07:44	Becky Reinhold	1:20:30
May 7, 1993	Joseph Keino (KEN)	1:03:10	Trina Painter (USA)	1:12:19
May 7, 1994	John Kipkoskei (KEN)	1:03:14	Roseli Machado (BRA)	1:13:42
May 6, 1995	Rolando Vera (ECU)	1:02:07	Tatyana Pozdnyakova (UKR)	1:13:35
May 4, 1996	Andrew Masai (KEN)	1:02:57	Valentina Yegorova (RUS)	1:13:00
May 3, 1997	Patrick Kiptum (KEN)	1:01:56	Valentina Yegorova (RUS) (2)	1:13:50
May 2, 1998	Joseph Kariuki (KEN)	1:02:32	Selina Chirchir (KEN)	1:14:32
May 1, 1999	Daniel Kihara (KEN)	1:03:48	Lyudmila Petrova (RUS)	1:14:12
May 6, 2000	Philip Kemei (KEN)	1:04:19	Lidiya Grigoryeva (RUS)	1:12:23
May 5, 2001	Simon Rono (KEN)	1:02:36	Yelena Paramonova (RUS)	1:11:36
May 4, 2002	Gabriel Muchiri (KEN)	1:01:54	Jackline Torori (KEN)	1:15:14
May 3, 2003	Joseph Kariuki (KEN)	1:03:43	Albina Ivanova (RUS)	1:11:24
May 8, 2004	Reuben Chebii (KEN)	1:04:56	Albina Ivanova (RUS) (2)	1:12:36
May 7, 2005	Wesley Ochoro (KEN)	1:03:31	Albina Ivanova (RUS) (3)	1:13:35
May 6, 2006	Ben Kimondiu (KEN)	1:03:22	Lucie Mays-Sulewski	1:19:12
May 5, 2007	Joseph Chirlee (KEN)	1:04:00	Janet Cherobon (KEN)	1:16:00
May 3, 2008	Lamech Mokono (KEN) Valentine Orare (KEN)	1:02:53	Janet Cherobon (KEN) (2)	1:14:53
May 2, 2009	Festus Langat (KEN)	1:03:55	Janet Cherobon (KEN) (3)	1:12:22
May 8, 2010	Festus Langat (KEN) (2)	1:02:51	Janet Cherobon (KEN) (4)	1:10:59
May 7, 2011	Ridouane Harroufi (MAR)	1:02:46	Everlyne Lagat (KEN)	1:11:29
May 5, 2012	George Towett (KEN)	1:05:08	Lilian Mariita (KEN)	1:15:23
May 4, 2013	Alene Reta (ETH)	1:03:58	Sarah Kiptoo (KEN)	1:12:26
May 3, 2014	Nelson Oyugi (KEN)	1:01:53	Lilian Mariita (KEN) (2)	1:12:04
May 2, 2015	Elisa Barno (KEN)	1:02:31	Sarah Kiptoo (KEN) (2)	1:13:09
May 7, 2016	MacDonard Ondara (KEN)	1:02:03	Ogla Kimaiyo (KEN)	1:11:43
May 6, 2017	John Murugu (KEN)	1:04:53	Margaret Maina (KEN)	1:15:51
May 5, 2018	Daniel Mesfun (ERI)	1:03:27	Dayna Pidhoresky (CAN)	1:12:47
May 4, 2019	Panuel Mkungo (KEN)	1:03:26	Ivy Kibet (KEN)	1:12:11
May 2, 2020	Not run due to COVID-19.			
May 7, 2022	Leonard Korir (USA)	1:02:35	Emily Sisson (USA)	1:07:11
May 6, 2023	Panuel Mkungo (KEN) (2)	1:01:44	Anna Rohrer (USA)	1:11:31
May 4, 2024	Jake Bertelsen (USA)	1:04:29	Anna Rohrer (USA) (2)	1:15:18
May 3, 2025	Brandon Olden (USA)	1:04:39	Mercy Chelangat (KEN)	1:10:32
May 2, 2026	James Quattlebaum (USA)	1:02:26	Rebecca Schmitt (USA)	1:10:10

== See also ==
- List of attractions and events in Indianapolis
- Sports in Indianapolis
- List of half marathon races
- List of largest running events
