= Duncan Kibet =

Kenyan long-distance runner

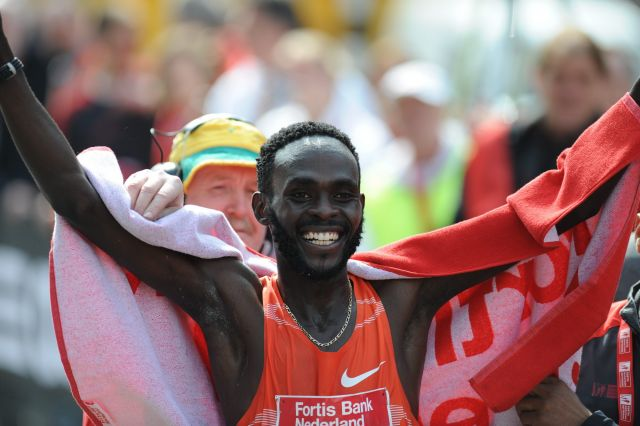
- Duncan Kibet after winning the 2009 Rotterdam Marathon.

Personal information
- Full name: Duncan Kibet
- Nationality: Kenyan
- Born: 25 April 1978 (age 48)

Sport
- Country: Kenya
- Sport: Athletics
- Event(s): Half marathon, Marathon
- Club: Rosa Associati

Achievements and titles
- Personal best: Marathon: 2:04:27 (Rotterdam 2009)
Medal record
Men's athletics
Representing Kenya
Marathons
Gold medal – first place	2009 Rotterdam	Marathon
Gold medal – first place	2008 Milan	Marathon
Silver medal – second place	2008 Vienna	Marathon

Duncan Kibet (born 25 April 1978) is a runner from Kenya. He became the second fastest marathoner ever with a time of 2:04:27 hours, when he won the 2009 Rotterdam Marathon.

== Career ==
Kibet dropped out of school in 1997 due to financial problems. He did not run competitively until after encouragement from his elder brother Luke Metto, who had some success as a runner at the turn of the century. He also followed Luke by moving to France, participating in local races. He won the Lille Half Marathon in 2004. Kibet started marathoning without major success. He finished 8th at the 2002 Monaco Marathon and 2nd at the 2004 Caen Marathon. He had also been in a car accident at age of 16, almost losing his ability to walk. During his early career he was afraid to run and train seriously, fearing he would break his leg again.

His younger brother Shadrack Biwott got a scholarship in the USA and arranged for Kibet to run some races there. Kibet won the inaugural Rock 'n' Roll Half Marathon in San Jose in 2006 by running 1:00:22. It was then the 2nd fastest half marathon time in the United States, after Haile Gebrselassie, who had run faster earlier that year. Kibet also won the 2007 Beach to Beacon 10k in a time of 27:51, besting a fast field over a tough, hilly course.

Kibet was a pacemaker for Gebrselassie at the 2008 Dubai Marathon where Gebrselassie failed to break the world marathon record already held by himself but set the 2nd fastest marathon time (2:04:53 hours) at the time.

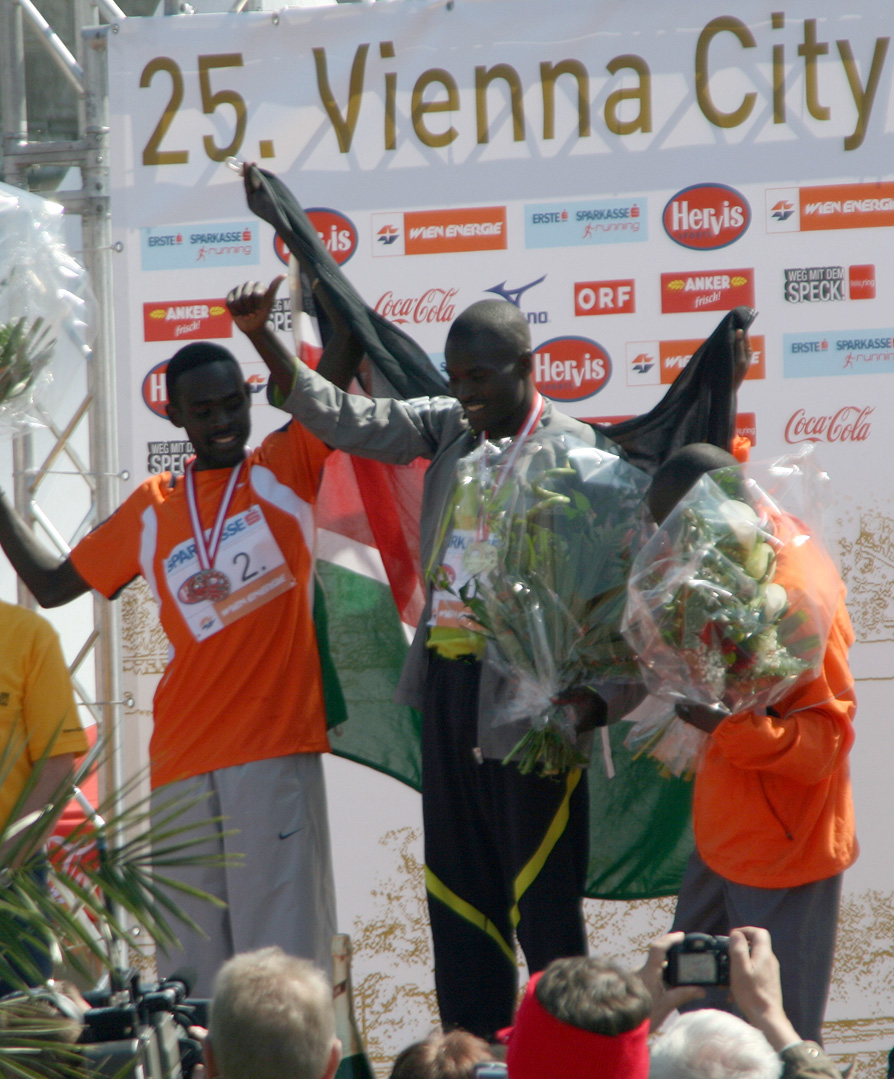
Duncan Kibet on the podium with Abel Kirui on the 2008 Vienna City Marathon

Kibet made his full marathon debut at the 2008 Vienna Marathon, finishing 2nd behind compatriot Abel Kirui and setting 2:08:33 hours. Later the same year he won the Milan Marathon, breaking the course record by running 2:07:53 hours.

Kibet won the Rotterdam Marathon on 5 April 2009, posting the 3rd fastest marathon time ever, 2:04:27 hours and was closely followed by James Kwambai who set the same time. Abel Kirui, who had beaten Kibet in 2008 in Vienna was now third also with a fast time (2:05:04 hours). The only one to have run faster marathons at the time was Haile Gebrselassie, who set world records at the 2007 and 2008 Berlin Marathons (2:04:26 and 2.03:59 hours, respectively), although in 2011, Geoffrey Mutai and Moses Mosop ran 2:03:02 and 2:03:06, respectively, on a point-to-point course not eligible for world record status, while Patrick Makau ran 2:03:38 for a new world record, and Wilson Kipsang ran 2:03:42 for the new 2nd best mark. The time was also a Kenyan record, beating Paul Tergat's world record time 2:04:55 set at the 2003 Berlin Marathon.

He is known for his bearded appearance as well as for wearing jewelry when running. He is nicknamed "Jamaican" and "Rasta" by fellow runners.

Kibet is married. His siblings, including Luke Metto, are also runners. His younger brother Shadrack Kiptoo-Biwott is an All-American runner at the University of Oregon. Duncan and Luke have a combined personal best marathon time of 4:15:24, a "world record" for siblings. The time is five seconds better than the combined time of Eric and Boaz Kimaiyo.

He is managed by the Rosa Associati, led by Federico Rosa.

== Achievements ==
- All results regarding marathon and half marathon

Year	Competition	Venue	Position	Notes
Representing Kenya
2002	Monaco Marathon	Monaco	8th	2:28:37
2004	Lille Half Marathon	Lille, France	1st	1:01:01
2004	Chassieu Half Marathon	Chassieu	1st	1:01:50
2004	Trith-Saint Leger Half Marathon	Trith-Saint-Léger	1st	1:02:13
2004	La Rochelle Marathon	La Rochelle, France	2nd	2:19:52
2004	Caen Marathon	Caen, France	2nd	2:20:13
2005	Delhi Half Marathon	New Delhi, India	2nd	1:02:18
2005	Vitry-sur-Seine Half Marathon	Vitry-sur-Seine	9th	1:02:42
2005	Boulogne Half Marathon	Boulogne-Billancourt, France	2nd	1:00:53
2006	Rock ‘n’ Roll San Jose Half Marathon	San Jose, California	1st	1:00:22
2006	Vitry-sur-Seine Half Marathon	Vitry-sur-Seine	2nd	1:00:59
2007	Saltillo Half Marathon	Saltillo, Mexico	1st	1:02:41
2008	Vienna City Marathon	Vienna, Austria	2nd	2:08:33
2008	Milano City Marathon	Milan, Italy	1st	2:07:53
2009	Ribarroja del Turia Half Marathon	Riba-roja de Túria, Spain	1st	1:01:37
2009	Lagos Half Marathon	Lagos, Nigeria	1st	1:02:09
2009	Rotterdam Marathon	Rotterdam, Netherlands	1st	2:04:27
2010	Lisbon Half Marathon	Lisbon, Portugal	4th	1:00:21
