= Sofi Malt SE =

Dark malt beverage produced by Heineken Ethiopia

Sofi Malt is a non-alcoholic dark malt beverage produced by Heineken Ethiopia, a subsidiary of Heineken International. It was first introduced in 1994.

SOFI malt

Heineken Ethiopia played crucial role in the Ethiopian brewing industry since 2011. Sofi Malt is the main sponsor of the Great Ethiopian Run.
