= Emily Setlack =

Canadian long-distance runner

Personal information
- Born: 2 June 1980 (age 45)

Sport
- Country: Canada
- Event: Long-distance running

Emily Setlack (born 2 June 1980) is a Canadian long-distance runner.

In 2018, she competed in the women's half marathon at the 2018 IAAF World Half Marathon Championships held in Valencia, Spain. She finished in 86th place. In the same year, she finished 11th at the 2018 World Mountain Running Championships held in Andorra. A month later, she won the GoodLife Fitness Victoria Marathon held on Vancouver Island in Victoria, British Columbia, Canada.

On 20 October 2019, Setlack finished second in the Canadian Olympic Trials Marathon in a time of 2:29.48.
