= Gyula Borka =

Hungarian long-distance runner

Gyula Borka (born 3 June 1959 in Budapest, Hungary) is a retired Hungarian athlete, who specialized in the long-distance running events. He represented his native European country at the 1992 Summer Olympics in Barcelona (Spain), finishing in 38th place (2:20:46).

== Achievements ==
Year	Competition	Venue	Position	Event	Notes
Representing Hungary
1992	Olympic Games	Barcelona, Spain	38th	Marathon	2:20:46
1992	Lille Marathon	Lille, France	1st	Marathon	2:13:15

- He still holds an old Hungary national record of 25.000 meters, with a time of 1:16:09, set in La Fleche (France) in 1992.
- He was six times Hungary national champion Marathon-running teams, and three times champion field-running teams.

== Family ==
- Father: Julius Borka (1930–1985) Danube river sailor, born in the former Czechoslovakia
- Mother: Valerie Szabo (1930–1985) elementary school teacher, born in Hungary.
- Wife: Martha Visnyei (born: May 31, 1962 in Szeged, Hungary) retired Hungarian athlete, who was Hungary national champion six times in singles and thirteen times in teams, from 1985 to 1999.
- Brother: Gabor Borka (born: August 19, 1961 in Budapest, Hungary) retired Hungarian kayaker, who was four times Hungary national champion.
