= Genet Getaneh =

Ethiopian long-distance runner (born 1986)

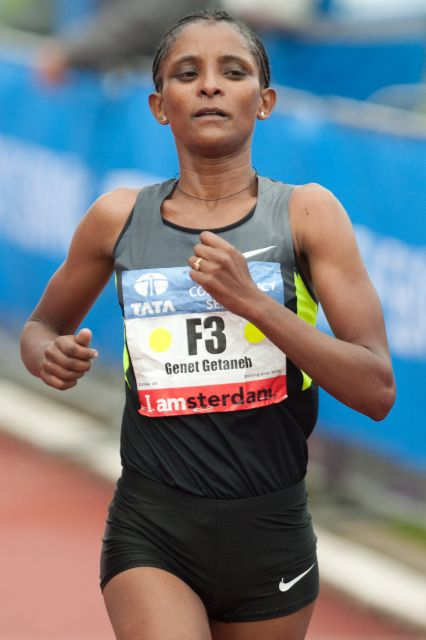
- Genet at the 2012 Amsterdam Marathon

Medal record

Women's athletics

Representing Ethiopia

World Half Marathon Championships
Gold medal – first place	2008 Rio de Janeiro	Team

Genet Getaneh Wendimagegnehu (born 6 January 1986) is an Ethiopian long-distance runner who competes in half marathon and marathon competitions. She represented Ethiopia at the IAAF World Half Marathon Championships in 2007 and 2008, finishing fourth at the latter race. She is a two-time winner of the Great Ethiopian Run and won the 2010 Zevenheuvelenloop. She has a personal best of 2:25:38 hours for the marathon and 1:08:18 hours for the half marathon.

== Career ==
Genet Getaneh grew up in Oromia Region's Arsi Zone in Ethiopia and began running in national level races as a teenager. She was selected to represent Ethiopia at the 2004 Yokohama Women's Ekiden and, leading off on the first 5 km leg, she helped her country to win the race. An individual win at the Great Ethiopian Run 10K in November established her among the top national level runners, as she ran a course record of 34:18 minutes and beat world-level medalist Teyba Erkesso and African champion Eyerusalem Kuma. She narrowly finished behind both of them to take third at the Silvesterlauf Trier at the end of the year.

Genet ran a 10 km for Ethiopia at the 2005 Yokohama Ekiden, but Ethiopia came third on that occasion. She had three wins over the 10K distance that year, taking the titles at the Stadsloop Appingedam and Run London races, then defending her title at the Ethiopian Run. In 2006, she made her first track appearance abroad at the FBK Games, finishing well down the field over 5000 metres, and had similar results at the Ethiopian Championships. She attempted another defence at the Ethiopian Run, but came third, and was runner-up at the end-of-year São Silvestre da Amadora.

Genet was based in the Netherlands at the start of 2007: she was third at the Parelloop in April and set a 10,000 metres best of 32:09:50 minutes in Valkenswaard. She moved up to longer distances and a third place at the Ethiopian 20 km Championship brought her selection for the 2007 IAAF World Road Running Championships. On her half marathon debut she came 19th in the event with a run of 1:10:30 hours. She ran at the Ethiopian Run for the fifth time in as many years and was fourth. She was fifth at the 2008 Ethiopian cross country championships, but did not gain selection for the world championships. However, she made her breakthrough in the half marathon that year. She was third at the Paris Half Marathon and her fourth place at the 2008 IAAF World Half Marathon Championships helped Ethiopia to the team title. She had a personal best run of 1:08:18 hours to take second behind Aselefech Mergia at the New Delhi Half Marathon and this ranked her the fourth fastest in the world that year.

Genet moved up to compete in the marathon in 2009 and performed well in her first outings, taking fifth place at both the Berlin Marathon and the Dubai Marathon with a personal best of 2:26:37 hours at the latter race. The following year she competed at both marathons again and was eighth in Dubai but failed to finish in Berlin. She had her best national finish over 10,000 m at the Ethiopian Championships, coming a close second to Amane Gobena, and ran a 15 km best of 47:54 minutes to beat Florence Kiplagat to the title at the Zevenheuvelenloop. Her 2011 season comprised three marathon races. First she came seventh in Dubai, then she managed fourth at the Vienna City Marathon. A new personal best of 2:25:57 hours came at the Amsterdam Marathon, although this was only enough for fourth as the race winner Tiki Gelana broke the course record. She made her American debut with a run at the 2012 Boston Marathon despite being among the early contenders she finished in eleventh place. She reached the podium at the 2012 Amsterdam Marathon, taking third place with a personal best run of 2:25:38 hours.
