= Julia Mumbi Muraga =

Kenyan marathon runner

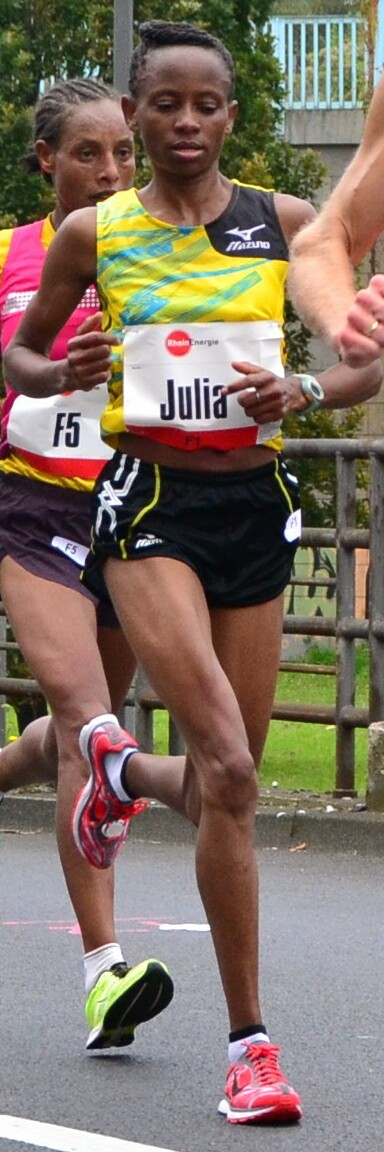
Image of Julia Mombi in a Race

Julia Mūmbi Mūraga (born January 25, 1984) is a Kenyan long-distance runner who competes in marathon races. She is based in Japan.

She made her marathon debut at the 2006 Beijing Marathon but finished outside of the top ten women. She was fifth at the 2007 Nagoya Marathon, fourth at the Sapporo Half Marathon, then won that year's Kobe Half Marathon. At the beginning of 2008 she won the Miyazaki Women's Road Race and came third at the Osaka Ladies Marathon.

Mūraga made her first international appearance for Kenya at the 2008 IAAF World Road Running Championships and her time of 1:11:11 hours for seventh place was enough to help the Kenyan women to the team silver medals. She was fifth at the 2009 Paris Marathon and represented her country in the women's marathon at the 2009 World Championships in Athletics, where she finished in twelfth place. She continued focusing on the marathon, coming eighth at the Tokyo Marathon and seventh in the Amsterdam Marathon in 2010.

She won her first marathon at the 2011 Reims à Toutes Jambes, where she fought off Ethiopian competition to claim the title in a time of 2:29:35 hours.

Mūraga won the 2014 Cologne Marathon in a time of 2:28:00 hours, but tested positive for EPO post-race. She was stripped of her victory and given a two-year ban from competition.

== Personal bests ==
Distance	Mark	Date	Location
Half marathon	1:08:31	2008	Sendai
Marathon	2:26:00	2008	Osaka
