= Royal Victoria Marathon =

- Date: October
- Location: Victoria, Canada
- Event type: Road
- Distance: Marathon
- Established: 1980
- Course records: Men's: 2:13:42 (2013) (Kenya) Lamech Mokono; Women's: 2:37:56 (2011) (Kenya) Lucy Njeri
- Website: Victoria Marathon
- Participants: 2,284 finishers (2021); 1,127 (2019)

The Royal Victoria Marathon, formerly known as the GoodLife Fitness Victoria Marathon or RVM, is a marathon race held on Vancouver Island in Victoria, British Columbia, Canada every October. It was first held in 1980 and was started by Robin Pearson, Alex Marshall and Bruce "Gunner" Shaw.

In 2006, the full marathon saw 1863 participants. The event also features a half marathon, 8K and 1.2K kids run and attracts nearly 10,000 competitors annually in all races. The full marathon is a certified Boston Marathon qualifier.

Two course records were set at the 2011 edition of the race: Thomas Omwenga ran a men's record of 2:14:33 hours and Lucy Njeri Muhami improved the women's record to 2:37:56 hours. Canada's Cindy Rhodes is the most successful athlete historically at the race, having won six times between 1991 and 2000. Kelvin Broad is a five-time winner, having taken consecutive wins from 1994 to 1998. Thomas Howard, Phil Nicholls, Steve Osaduik and Suzanne Evans have each won the Victoria Marathon on three occasions.

== Results ==
Key: Course record 21 km race

Edition	Year	Men's Winner	Time (h:m:s)	Women's Winner	Time (h:m:s)
1st	1980	Thomas Howard (CAN)	2:21:45	Wendy Robertson (CAN)	2:58:27
2nd	1981	Thomas Howard (CAN)	2:18:49	Linda Edgar (USA)	2:49:02
3rd	1982	Brian Bjornson (CAN)	2:25:46	Leslie Tomlinson (CAN)	2:56:02
4th	1983	Douglas Godfrey (CAN)	2:25:39	Bernadette Duffy (CAN)	2:52:49
5th	1984	Thomas Howard (CAN)	2:21:51	Christine Craigen (CAN)	3:02:28
6th	1985	Ron Wichmann (CAN)	2:27:38	Cheryl Westrum (USA)	2:56:04
7th	1986	Phillip Nicholls (CAN)	2:28:16	Toni Hafso (CAN)	2:51:35
8th	1987	Ashley Dustow (AUS)	2:24:18	Susan Butler (CAN)	2:55:21
9th	1988	Peter Butler (CAN)	2:22:04	Val Chowaniec (CAN)	2:48:05
10th	1989	Phillip Nicholls (CAN)	2:29:43	Val Chowaniec (CAN)	2:42:32
11th	1990	Phillip Nicholls (CAN)	2:26:24	Linda Stenseth (CAN)	2:55:17
12th	1991	Jacques Bilinski (CAN)	2:26:23	Cindy Rhodes (CAN)	2:56:59
13th	1992	Gabriel Silva (USA)	2:26:42	Frances Bagley (CAN)	2:52:43
14th	1993	Kevin Titus (CAN)	2:19:31	Cindy Rhodes (CAN)	2:48:53
15th	1994	Kelvin Broad (CAN)	2:23:02	Cindy Rhodes (CAN)	2:48:45
16th	1995	Kelvin Broad (CAN)	2:25:31	Cindy Rhodes (CAN)	2:50:08
17th	1996	Kelvin Broad (CAN)	2:27:19	Cheri Titus (CAN)	2:55:09
18th	1997	Kelvin Broad (CAN)	2:28:56	Stephanie Andrews (CAN)	2:42:43
19th	1998	Kelvin Broad (CAN)	2:27:56	Noriko Kawaguchi (JPN)	2:49:06
20th	1999	Bruce Deacon (CAN)	2:26:23	Cindy Rhodes (CAN)	2:52:49
21st	2000	Colin Dignum (CAN)	2:26:52	Cindy Rhodes (CAN)	2:54:22
22nd	2001	Jon Brown (GBR)	2:20:28	Katrina Blanch (CAN)	2:57:35
23rd	2002	Trevor Jordan (CAN)	2:35:07	Krystyna Pieczulis (POL)	2:47:11
24th	2003	Shingirai Badza (ZIM)	2:27:09	Joan McGrath (CAN)	2:52:46
25th	2004	Bruce Deacon (CAN)	2:21:07	Hallie-Ann Janssen (USA)	2:49:36
26th	2005	James Finlayson (CAN)	2:24:13	Suzanne Evans (CAN)	2:50:24
27th	2006	Steve Osaduik (CAN)	2:16:49	Suzanne Evans (CAN)	2:47:05
28th	2007	Steve Osaduik (CAN)	2:20:14	Suzanne Evans (CAN)	2:45:38
29th	2008	Steve Osaduik (CAN)	2:25:31	Cheryl Murphy (CAN)	2:43:00
30th	2009	Hillary Cheruiyot (KEN)	2:19:26	Cheryl Murphy (CAN)	2:44:01
31st	2010	Phillip Samoei (KEN)	2:23:24	Catrin Jones (CAN)	2:52:21
32nd	2011	Thomas Omwenga (KEN)	2:14:33	Lucy Njeri (KEN)	2:37:56
33rd	2012	Thomas Omwenga (KEN)	2:20:41	Hallie-Ann Janssen (USA)	2:47:03
34th	2013	Lamech Mokono (KEN)	2:13:42	Catrin Jones (CAN)	2:43:03
35th	2014	Daniel Kipkoech (KEN)	2:20:04	Lyudmila Korchagina (CAN)	2:41:39
36th	2015	Daniel Kipkoech (KEN)	2:25:40	Erin Burrett (CAN)	2:39:17
37th	2016	Daniel Kipkoech (KEN)	2:20:33	Sabrina-Shirley Wilkie (CAN)	2:45:54
38th	2017	Daniel Kipkoech (KEN)	2:21:04	Lissa Zimmer (CAN)	2:48:33
39th	2018	Daniel Kipkoech (KEN)	2:22:39	Emily Setlack (CAN)	2:46:20
40th	2019	Eric Finan (USA)	2:17:51	Andrea Lee (CAN)	2:46:45
	2020	Event cancelled due to COVID-19 coronavirus pandemic			
41st	2021	Matthew Travaglini (CAN)	1:06:44	Leanne Klassen (CAN)	1:17:15

== See also ==
- List of marathon races in North America
