= Great Ethiopian Run =

Annual 10-kilometre road running event in Ethiopia

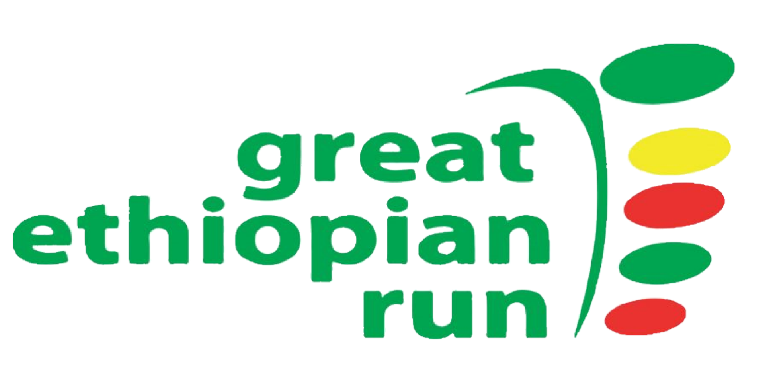
- Official logo
- Date: Mostly in November
- Location: Addis Ababa, Ethiopia
- Event type: Road
- Distance: 10KM
- Primary sponsor: Sofi Malt
- Established: 2001
- Course records: Men: 28:18.61 (2006) (Ethiopia) Deriba Merga; Women: 31:17 (2022) (Ethiopia) Yalemzerf Yehualaw
- Website: Great Ethiopian Run

The Great Ethiopian Run (Amharic: ታላቁ ሩጫ በኢትዮጵያ) is an annual 10-kilometre road running event which takes place in late November in Addis Ababa, Ethiopia. With 45,000 participants, the race has become the biggest road race in Africa.

== Overview ==
The competition was first envisioned by neighbours Ethiopian runner Haile Gebrselassie, Peter Middlebrook and Abi Masefield in late October 2000, following Haile's return from the 2000 Summer Olympics.

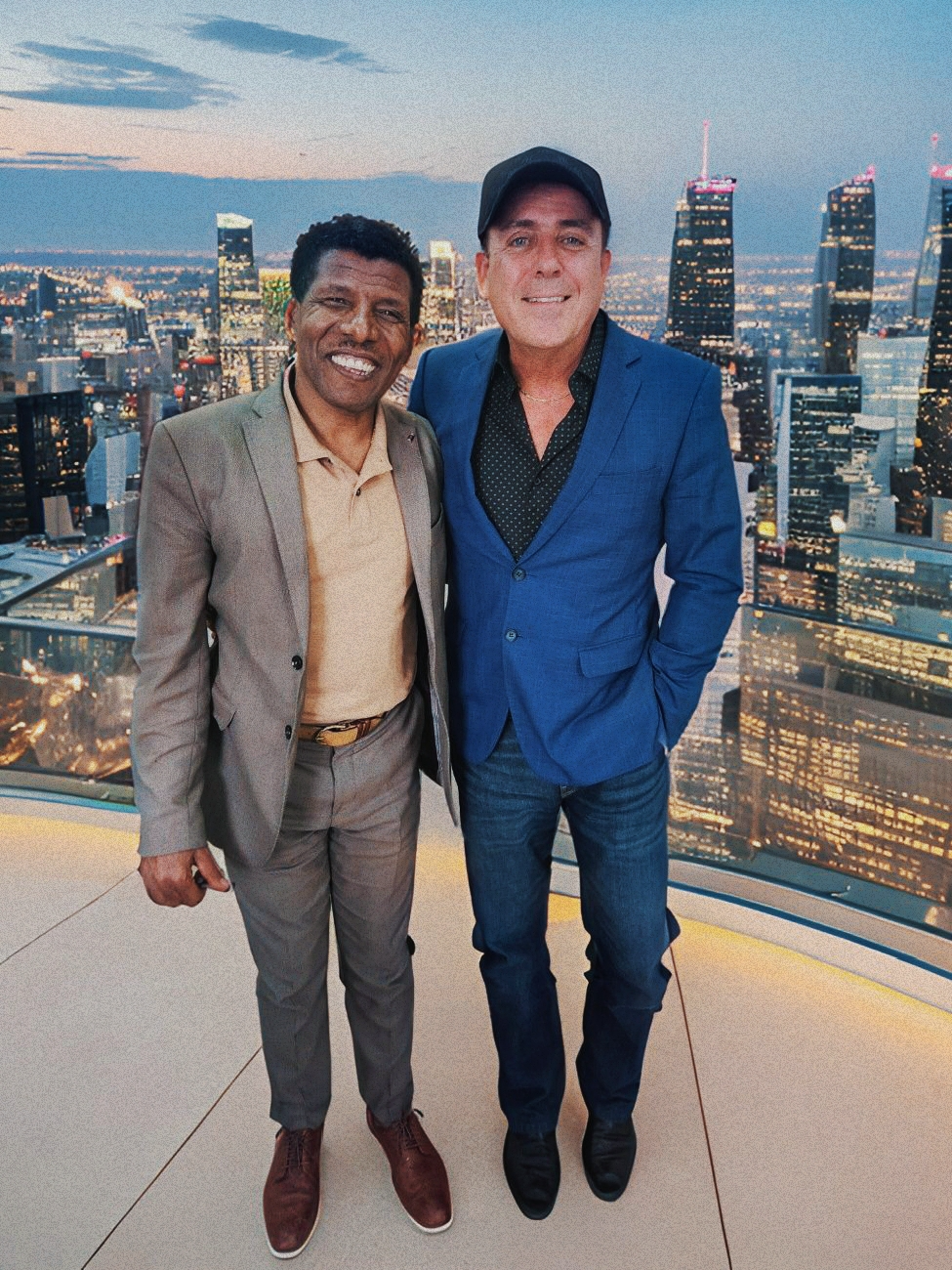
Great Ethiopian Run founders Haile Gebrselassie and Peter Middlebrook in 2023

The 10,000 entries for the first edition quickly sold out and other people unofficially joined the race without a number. The creation of the race marked the first time that a major annual 10 km race had been held in the country, renowned for producing world-class runners. The day's events include an international and popular 10 km race and a 5 km women-only race.

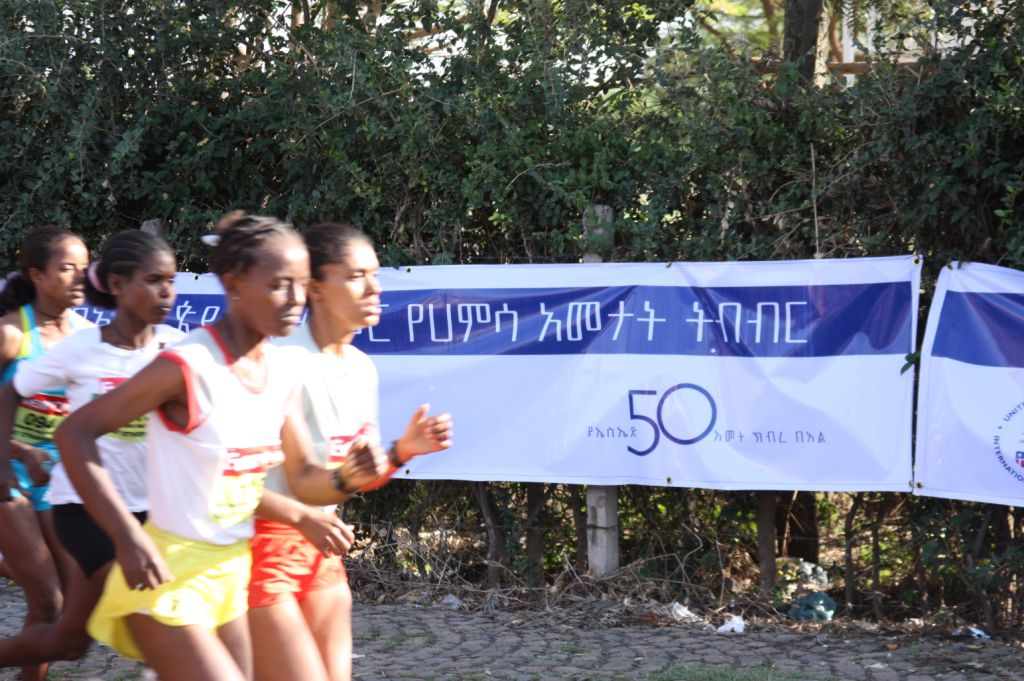
Competitors at the 2011 Great Ethiopian Run.

The elite race attracts a number of prominent runners. Haile Gebrselassie won the inaugural men's race and at the second edition many of the country's top long-distance runners competed, with Gebre Gebremariam, Sileshi Sihine and Kenenisa Bekele comprising the top three in the men's race and Worknesh Kidane and Tirunesh Dibaba taking first and second in the women's race. Although more established competitors do take part, the race is known for highlighting the best of Ethiopia's up-and-coming running talent – many of the race's podium finishers, little-known at the time, have gone on to achieve success on the global stage.

By 2005, the number of race entries had grown to 25,000 participants. There were around 35,000 runners competing at the 2010 edition. The combination of the quality of the national elite field and the time-impeding altitude of Addis Ababa (8000 ft) means that the international race does not attract many elite runners from other countries. Given the prominence of the race and its importance to emerging athletes, the races - particularly the men's - are hotly contested with large leading packs early on and much physical interaction. Standing in contrast to other large-scale running events, fun runners at the Great Ethiopian Run do not typically compete to raise money for charity, but instead, compete for their own personal reasons.

The 2016 event saw over 40,000 registrations despite the fact that a 6-month state of emergency was declared in October following violent anti-government protests. Abe Gashahun and Foiteyn Tesfaye, both relatively new and unknown young athletes, were the surprise winners of the 16th edition of the Great Ethiopian Run 10km international road race which was held on Sunday, November 20, 2016.

Abe Gashahun won in a tight sprint finish ahead of Kenyan athlete Jorum Lumbasi, who became the first Kenyan male to place in the top three since Nathan Naibei finished 2nd here in 2005. Four athletes had entered the final home straight locked together and Gashahun only clinched victory in the final few metres of the race.

Gashahun, coached by Haji Ajilo comes from Debre Birhan, 120km northeast of Addis Ababa, and travelled to the capital yesterday for this race.

“I have competed abroad only twice until now, both times in France. I hope that my win today will give me more opportunities to compete in international races abroad, “he said after the race.

The women’s winner Foiteyn Tesfaye who was also appearing in the race for the first time surprised better-known names in the race. Tesfaye runs for the Messebo club based in the northern province of Tigray and is still relatively new to the racing scene in Addis Ababa.

The competition has had high-profile headline sponsors over its history: it was sponsored by Total from 2002–2003, Toyota from 2004–2008, and Ethiopian Airlines has been the current title sponsor since 2009.

On November 9, 2023 over 45,000 runners participated in the event.

== Past winners ==
Key: Course record

Edition	Year	Men's winner	Time (m:s)	Women's winner	Time (m:s)
1st	2001	Haile Gebrselassie (ETH)	30:04	Berhane Adere (ETH)	35:07
2nd	2002	Gebregziabher Gebremariam (ETH)	30:15	Werknesh Kidane (ETH)	34:34
3rd	2003	Sileshi Sihine (ETH)	29:52.71	Tirunesh Dibaba (ETH)	34:48
4th	2004	Abebe Dinkesa (ETH)	29:57	Genet Getaneh (ETH)	34:18
5th	2005	Ketema Nigusse (ETH)	28:24.13	Genet Getaneh (ETH)	33:05.13
6th	2006	Deriba Merga (ETH)	28:18.61	Belaynesh Fikadu (ETH)	33:02.25
7th	2007	Tsegaye Kebede (ETH)	29:06.50	Wude Ayalew (ETH)	33:50.86
8th	2008	Chala Dechasa (ETH)	28:55	Wude Ayalew (ETH)	33:31
9th	2009	Tilahun Regassa (ETH)	28:36	Koren Jelela (ETH)	33:03
10th	2010	Azmeraw Bekele (ETH)	29:25	Sule Utura (ETH)	33:35
11th	2011	Mosinet Geremew (ETH)	28:37	Abebech Afework (ETH)	32:59
12th	2012	Hagos Gebrhiwet (ETH)	28:37	Aberu Kebede (ETH)	33:27
13th	2013	Atsedu Tsegay (ETH)	29:21	Netsanet Gudeta (ETH)	33:23
14th	2014	Azmeraw Bekele (ETH)	30:11	Wude Ayalew (ETH)	34:03
15th	2015	Tamirat Tola (ETH)	28:44	Mamitu Daska (ETH)	32:16
16th	2016	Abe Gashahun (ETH)	28:53	Fotyen Tesfay (ETH)	33:09
17th	2017	Selemon Barega (ETH)	28:36	Zeineba Yimer (ETH)	32:30
18th	2018	Hagos Gebrhiwet (ETH)	28:54	Fotyen Tesfay (ETH)	33:44
19th	2019	Berihu Aregawi (ETH)	28:23	Yalemzerf Yehualaw (ETH)	31:55
20th	2021	Abe Gashahun (ETH)	28:20	Tsigie Gebreselama (ETH)	32:33
21st	2022	Gemechu Dida (ETH)	28:23	Yalemzerf Yehualaw (ETH)	31:17
22nd	2022	Abe Gashahun (ETH)	28:32	Tigist Ketema (ETH)	32:54
23rd	2023	Biniam Mehary (ETH)	28:18	Melknat Wudu (ETH)	32:27
24th	2024	Biniam Mehary (ETH)	28:26	Asayech Ayichew (ETH)	32:14
25th	2025	Yismaw Dillu (ETH)	28:25	Melknat Wudu (ETH)	32:10
