= Rock 'n' Roll San Jose Half Marathon =

Coordinates: 37.3321°N 121.8901°W

- Date: October
- Location: San Jose, California
- Event type: Road
- Distance: Half marathon, 10K, 5K
- Established: 2006
- Website: Rock 'n' Roll San Jose Half Marathon

The Rock 'n' Roll San Jose Half Marathon is an annual half marathon race which takes place in San Jose, California in the United States. It also features a 10K and 5K race. The 2023 edition featured nearly 11,000 total runners with most participants running the half marathon. It is part of the Rock 'n' Roll Running Series of road running competitions organized by the IRONMAN Group, part of Advance Publications.

== Incidents ==
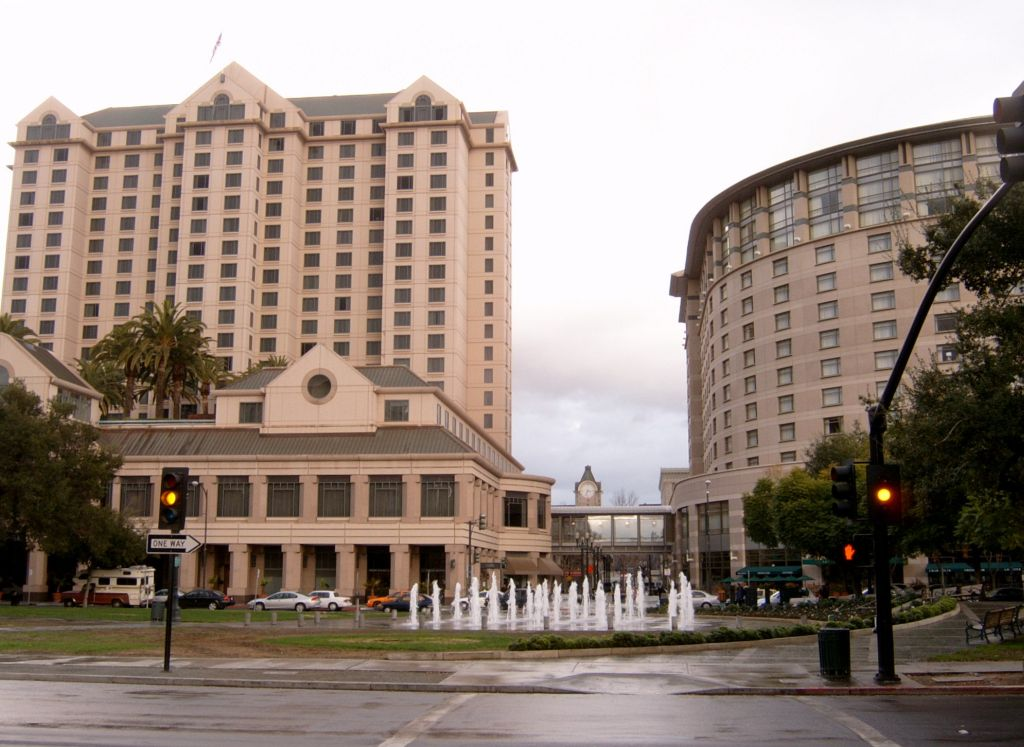
Plaza De Cesar Chavez, near the finish line

In 2009 two runners died towards the end of the race.

== Past winners ==
Men's half marathon race
Date	Athlete	Country	Time
2024	Andrew Kaye	United States	1:04:37
2023	CJ Albertson	United States	1:03:02
2022	Justin Kent	Canada	1:02:48
2021	Matthew Baxter	United States	1:02:38
2019	Matthew Baxter	United States	1:02:57
2018	Sid Vaughn	United States	1:03:35
2017	George Byron Alex	United States	1:03:39
2013	Ryan Vail	United States	1:02:46
2012	Simon Bairu	Canada	1:03:28
2011	Meb Keflezighi	United States	1:02:17
2010	Meb Keflezighi	United States	1:01:45
2009	Meb Keflezighi	United States	1:01:00
2008	Gilbert Okari	Kenya	1:01:46
2007	McDonald Ondara	Kenya	1:01:11
2006	Duncan Kibet	Kenya	1:00:22

Women's half marathon race
Date	Athlete	Country	Time
2024	Lindsey Bradley	United States	1:13:22
2013	Natasha Wodak	Canada	1:14:39
2012	Clara Horowitz Peterson	United States	1:12:52
2011	Deena Kastor	United States	1:12:23
2010	Blake Russell	United States	1:11:55
2009	Belaynesh Zemedkun	Ethiopia	1:11:24
2008	Yuri Kano	Japan	1:10:03
2007	Magdalene Makunzi	Kenya	1:09:58
2006	Silvia Skvortsova	Russia	1:09:17

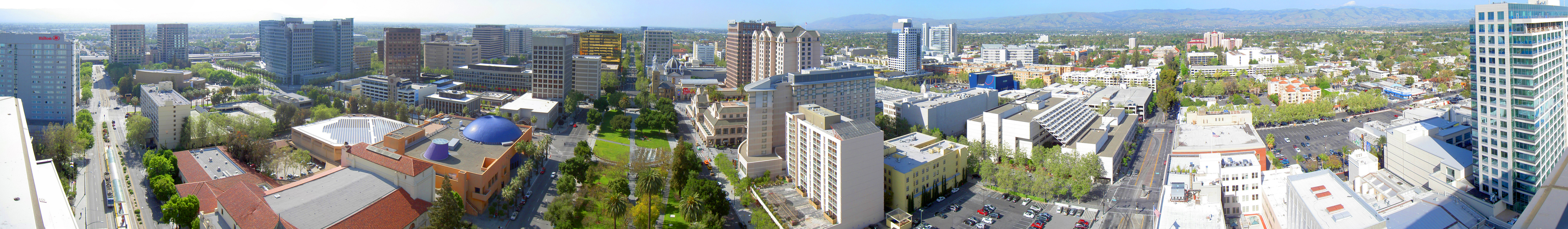
Overhead panorama of downtown San Jose near the finish line.
