= 2008 IAAF World Half Marathon Championships =

- Host city: Rio de Janeiro, Rio de Janeiro, Brazil
- Nations: 42
- Athletes: 155
- Events: 2
- Dates: 2008-10-12
- Race length: 21.0975 kilometres
- Individual prize money (US$): 1st: 30,000; 2nd: 15,000; 3rd: 10,000; 4th: 7,000; 5th: 5,000; 6th: 3,000
- Team prize money (US$): 1st: 15,000; 2nd: 12,000; 3rd: 9,000; 4th: 7,500; 5th: 6,000; 6th: 3,000

The 2008 IAAF World Half Marathon Championships were held in Rio de Janeiro, Brazil on 12 October 2008.

This event was first announced as the 2008 IAAF World Road Running Championships, but in November 2007, the IAAF announced that the name of the IAAF World Road Running Championships would revert to its original title of the IAAF World Half Marathon Championships.

Detailed reports on the event and an appraisal of the results were given both for the men's race and for the women's race.

== Medallists ==
Event	Gold		Silver		Bronze	
Individual
Men	Zersenay Tadesse (ERI)	59:56	Patrick Makau Musyoki (KEN)	1:01:54	Ahmed Hassan Abdullah (QAT)	1:01:57
Women	Lornah Kiplagat (NED)	1:08:37	Aselefech Mergia (ETH)	1:09:57	Pamela Chepchumba (KEN)	1:10:01
Team
Team Men	Kenya	3:07:24	Eritrea	3:09:40	Qatar	3:10:52
Team Women	Ethiopia	3:30:59	Kenya	3:31:24	Japan	3:40:58

== Race results ==
Complete results were published for the men's race, for the women's race, for men's team, and for women's team.

=== Men's ===
Rank	Athlete	Nationality	Time	Notes
1st place, gold medalist(s)	Zersenay Tadesse	Eritrea	59:56	CR
2nd place, silver medalist(s)	Patrick Makau Musyoki	Kenya	1:01:54	
3rd place, bronze medalist(s)	Ahmed Hassan Abdullah	Qatar	1:01:57	SB
4	Stephen Kipkoech Kibiwott	Kenya	1:01:58	
5	Yusei Nakao	Japan	1:02:05	
6	Dieudonné Disi	Rwanda	1:03:03	
7	Abebe Dinkessa	Ethiopia	1:03:04	
8	Marilson dos Santos	Brazil	1:03:14	
9	Joseph Maregu	Kenya	1:03:32	
10	Essa Ismail Rashed	Qatar	1:03:57	PB
11	Sylvain Rukundo	Rwanda	1:04:02	SB
12	Michael Tesfay	Eritrea	1:04:04	SB
13	Eshetu Wondemu	Ethiopia	1:04:11	
14	Raji Assefa	Ethiopia	1:04:32	
15	Ignacio Cáceres	Spain	1:04:39	
16	Michael Shelley	Australia	1:04:44	
17	Pedro Mora	Venezuela	1:04:45	SB
18	Dereje Tesfaye	Ethiopia	1:04:57	
19	Ali Dawoud Sedam	Qatar	1:04:58	SB
20	Giomar da Silva	Brazil	1:05:07	SB
21	Jason Lehmkuhle	United States	1:05:17	
22	Tshamano Setone	South Africa	1:05:20	
23	Anatoliy Rybakov	Russia	1:05:38	
24	James Theuri	France	1:05:38	
25	Mogos Ahferom	Eritrea	1:05:40	PB
26	Iván Galán	Spain	1:05:42	
27	João de Lima	Brazil	1:05:46	
28	Franck de Almeida	Brazil	1:05:52	SB
29	Yemane Teame	Eritrea	1:05:56	PB
30	Yevgeniy Rybakov	Russia	1:05:59	
31	Andrew Smith	Canada	1:06:10	
32	Yukihiro Kitaoka	Japan	1:06:26	
33	Mikhail Lemaev	Russia	1:06:35	
34	Javier Díaz	Spain	1:06:37	
35	Rod Koborsi	United States	1:06:46	
36	Sultan Khamis Zaman	Qatar	1:06:50	SB
37	Kazuo Ietani	Japan	1:06:57	
38	Keenetse Moswasi	Botswana	1:07:08	SB
39	Jeffrey Gwebu	South Africa	1:07:08	
40	Felix Kibore	Qatar	1:07:10	PB
41	Kaelo Mosalagae	Botswana	1:07:12	SB
42	Jorge Cabrera	Paraguay	1:07:26	SB
43	Dmitriy Semyonov	Russia	1:07:40	
44	Fabrice Jaouen	France	1:07:41	
45	Gervais Hakizimana	Rwanda	1:07:57	
46	Cristinel Irimia	Romania	1:08:11	
47	Jesper Faurschou	Denmark	1:08:14	
48	Artur Kozłowski	Poland	1:08:24	
49	Tetsuo Nishimura	Japan	1:08:34	
50	Vladimir Guerra	Ecuador	1:08:36	
51	Ivanildo dos Anjos	Brazil	1:08:38	
52	Moorosi Soke	South Africa	1:08:41	
53	Steve Sundell	United States	1:08:47	
54	Lameck Mosoti	Kenya	1:08:49	
55	Ulises Sanguinetti	Argentina	1:09:08	
56	Rolando Pillco	Bolivia	1:09:51	PB
57	Stéphane Joly	Switzerland	1:09:56	PB
58	Cleveland Forde	Guyana	1:10:20	PB
59	Kabo Gabaseme	Botswana	1:10:33	SB
60	Miguel Ángel Almachi	Ecuador	1:10:34	PB
61	Didimo Sánchez	Venezuela	1:10:36	
62	Julien Moreau	France	1:10:40	
63	Siphesihle Mdluli	Swaziland	1:10:47	SB
64	Ernesto Zamora	Uruguay	1:11:01	SB
65	Vasyl Matviychuk	Ukraine	1:11:12	
66	Oswaldo Belandria	Venezuela	1:11:23	
67	Stephen Mokoka	South Africa	1:11:45	
68	Wilson Videla	Argentina	1:11:53	
69	Mark Tucker	Australia	1:12:04	SB
70	Julio César Pérez	Mexico	1:12:42	SB
71	Richard Jones	Trinidad and Tobago	1:13:01	SB
72	Paulo Buenaño	Ecuador	1:13:02	
73	Patrick Gildea	United States	1:14:06	
74	Gustavo Comba	Argentina	1:14:35	
75	Thibaud Naël	France	1:14:50	
76	Fernando Blanco	Panama	1:14:50	
77	Wang Enjun	China	1:15:19	PB
78	Gustavo López	Paraguay	1:15:33	PB
79	Alejandro Cuahtepizi	Mexico	1:16:53	SB
80	Bernardo Jiménez	Dominican Republic	1:17:39	
81	Guido Benedetti	Argentina	1:17:44	
82	Delvis Sánchez	Venezuela	1:18:02	
83	Masato Kihara	Japan	1:20:05	
84	Ryan Kirkpatrick	United States	1:20:50	
85	Chan Chan Kit	Macau	1:25:14	
86	Dario Nuñez	Argentina	1:28:24	
—	Deriba Merga	Ethiopia	DNF	
—	Mekubo Mogusu	Kenya	DNF	
—	Tim Rogers	Norfolk Island	DNF	
—	Lindihaya Mthangayi	South Africa	DNF	
—	Samson Kiflemariam	Eritrea	DNS	
—	Jussi Utriainen	Finland	DNS	

=== Women's ===
Rank	Athlete	Nationality	Time	Notes
1st place, gold medalist(s)	Lornah Kiplagat	Netherlands	1:08:37	SB
2nd place, silver medalist(s)	Aselefech Mergia	Ethiopia	1:09:57	PB
3rd place, bronze medalist(s)	Pamela Chepchumba	Kenya	1:10:01	
4	Genet Getaneh	Ethiopia	1:10:03	PB
5	Peninah Arusei	Kenya	1:10:12	
6	Abebu Gelan	Ethiopia	1:10:59	PB
7	Julia Mombi Muraga	Kenya	1:11:11	
8	Atsede Habtamu	Ethiopia	1:11:13	
9	Luminița Talpoș	Romania	1:11:16	SB
10	Yukiko Akaba	Japan	1:11:39	
11	Meseret Mengistu	Ethiopia	1:12:03	PB
12	Furtuna Zegergish	Eritrea	1:12:16	SB
13	Dulce Félix	Portugal	1:12:56	
14	Pauline Ngigi	Kenya	1:12:58	
15	Yesenia Centeno	Spain	1:13:01	
16	Azucena Díaz	Spain	1:13:30	
17	Maria Baldaia	Brazil	1:13:42	SB
18	Olesya Syreva	Russia	1:14:08	
19	Miki Ohira	Japan	1:14:27	
20	Lyudmila Biktasheva	Russia	1:14:33	
21	Melissa White	United States	1:14:37	
22	Yuko Machida	Japan	1:14:52	
23	Ikuyo Yamashita	Japan	1:15:05	
24	Dorothy McMaham	United States	1:15:14	
25	Kristen Nicolini	United States	1:15:15	
26	Angeline Nyiransabimana	Rwanda	1:15:23	SB
27	Stephanie Herbst	United States	1:15:25	PB
28	Maria Sig Møller	Denmark	1:15:30	
29	Rosa Godoy	Argentina	1:15:31	PB
30	Jill Steffens	United States	1:16:02	PB
31	Christine Bardelle	France	1:16:17	
32	Dorota Gruca-Giezek	Poland	1:16:46	
33	María Díaz	Puerto Rico	1:16:52	NR
34	Marizete dos Santos	Brazil	1:17:04	SB
35	Maria Isabel Montilla	Venezuela	1:17:19	
36	Yolanda Fernández	Colombia	1:17:27	
37	Sharon Tavengwa	Zimbabwe	1:18:30	
38	Yamna Oubouhou	France	1:18:39	
39	Angélica Sánchez	Mexico	1:18:49	
40	Wendy Nicholls/Jones	Great Britain	1:18:52	
41	Zenaida Maldonado	Puerto Rico	1:19:28	PB
42	Zuleima Amaya	Venezuela	1:20:01	
43	Tatyana Khmeleva-Aryasova	Russia	1:20:06	
44	Judith Ramírez	Mexico	1:20:18	
45	Edielza Guimarães	Brazil	1:20:25	
46	Sonia Calizaya	Bolivia	1:20:34	SB
47	Michelle Ross-Cope	Great Britain	1:20:43	
48	Oksana Sklyarenko	Ukraine	1:21:11	SB
49	Roxana Preussler	Argentina	1:22:29	
50	Estela María Martínez	Argentina	1:22:51	
51	Magdalena Luca	Romania	1:23:37	
52	Mileydy Jaimes	Venezuela	1:23:38	
53	Susana Rebolledo	Chile	1:24:18	
54	Jiang Chengcheng	China	1:26:20	SB
55	Paula Todoran	Romania	1:27:51	
56	Rosa America Rodríguez	Venezuela	1:28:49	
57	Rosângela Faria	Brazil	1:29:11	
58	Andreina De La Rosa	Dominican Republic	1:29:30	PB
59	Marisol Redón	Uruguay	1:31:20	SB
60	Chao Fong Leng	Macau	1:38:08	SB
—	Marizete Rezende	Brazil	DNF	
—	Carmen Vallés	Puerto Rico	DNF	
—	Alina Ivanova	Russia	DNF	
—	Ntombesintu Mfunzi	South Africa	DNF	
—	Johanna van Schalkwyk	South Africa	DNF	

== Team results ==
=== Men's ===
Rank	Country	Team	Time
1st place, gold medalist(s)	Kenya	Patrick Makau Musyoki; Stephen Kipkoech Kibiwott; Joseph Maregu	3:07:24
2nd place, silver medalist(s)	Eritrea	Zersenay Tadesse; Michael Tesfay; Mogos Ahferom	3:09:40
3rd place, bronze medalist(s)	Qatar	Ahmed Hassan Abdullah; Essa Ismail Rashed; Ali Dawoud Sedam	3:10:52
4	Ethiopia	Abebe Dinkessa; Eshetu Wondemu; Raji Assefa	3:11:47
5	Brazil	Marilson dos Santos; Giomar da Silva; João de Lima	3:14:07
6	Rwanda	Dieudonné Disi; Sylvain Rukundo; Gervais Hakizimana	3:15:02
7	Japan	Yusei Nakao; Yukihiro Kitaoka; Kazuo Ietani	3:15:28
8	Spain	Ignacio Cáceres; Iván Galán; Javier Díaz	3:16:58
9	Russia	Anatoliy Rybakov; Yevgeniy Rybakov; Mikhail Lemaev	3:18:12
10	United States	Jason Lehmkuhle; Rod Koborsi; Steve Sundell	3:20:50
11	South Africa	Tshamano Setone; Jeffrey Gwebu; Moorosi Soke	3:21:09
12	France	James Theuri; Fabrice Jaouen; Julien Moreau	3:23:59
13	Botswana	Keenetse Moswasi; Kaelo Mosalagae; Kabo Gabaseme	3:24:53
14	Venezuela	Pedro Mora; Didimo Sánchez; Oswaldo Belandria	3:26:44
15	Ecuador	Vladimir Guerra; Miguel Ángel Almachi; Paulo Buenaño	3:32:12
16	Argentina	Ulises Sanguinetti; Wilson Videla; Gustavo Comba	3:35:36

=== Women's ===
Rank	Country	Team	Time
1st place, gold medalist(s)	Ethiopia	Aselefech Mergia; Genet Getaneh; Abebu Gelan	3:30:59
2nd place, silver medalist(s)	Kenya	Pamela Chepchumba; Peninah Arusei; Julia Mombi Muraga	3:31:24
3rd place, bronze medalist(s)	Japan	Yukiko Akaba; Miki Ohira; Yuko Machida	3:40:58
4	United States	Melissa White; Dorothy McMaham; Kristen Nicolini	3:45:06
5	Russia	Olesya Syreva; Lyudmila Biktasheva; Tatyana Khmeleva-Aryasova	3:48:47
6	Brazil	Maria Baldaia; Marizete dos Santos; Edielza Guimarães	3:51:11
7	Argentina	Rosa Godoy; Roxana Preussler; Estela María Martínez	4:00:51
8	Venezuela	Maria Isabel Montilla; Zuleima Amaya; Mileydy Jaimes	4:00:58
—	Puerto Rico	María Díaz; Zenaida Maldonado; Carmen Vallés	DNF

== Participation ==
The participation of 155 athletes (90 men/65 women) from 42 countries is reported. Although announced, athletes from Finland did not show.

- Argentina (8)
- Australia (2)
- Bolivia (2)
- Botswana (3)
- Brazil (10)
- Canada (1)
- Chile (1)
- China (2)
- Colombia (1)
- Denmark (2)
- Dominican Republic (2)
- Ecuador (3)
- Eritrea (5)
- Ethiopia (10)
- France (6)
- Guyana (1)
- Japan (9)
- Kenya (9)
- Macau (2)
- Mexico (4)
- Netherlands (1)
- Norfolk Island (1)
- Panama (1)
- Paraguay (2)
- Poland (2)
- Portugal (1)
- Puerto Rico (3)
- Qatar (5)
- Romania (4)
- Russia (8)
- Rwanda (4)
- South Africa (7)
- Spain (5)
- Swaziland (1)
- Switzerland (1)
- Trinidad and Tobago (1)
- Ukraine (2)
- United Kingdom (2)
- United States (10)
- Uruguay (2)
- Venezuela (8)
- Zimbabwe (1)

== See also ==
- 2008 in athletics (track and field)
