= Joseph Maregu =

Kenyan long-distance runner

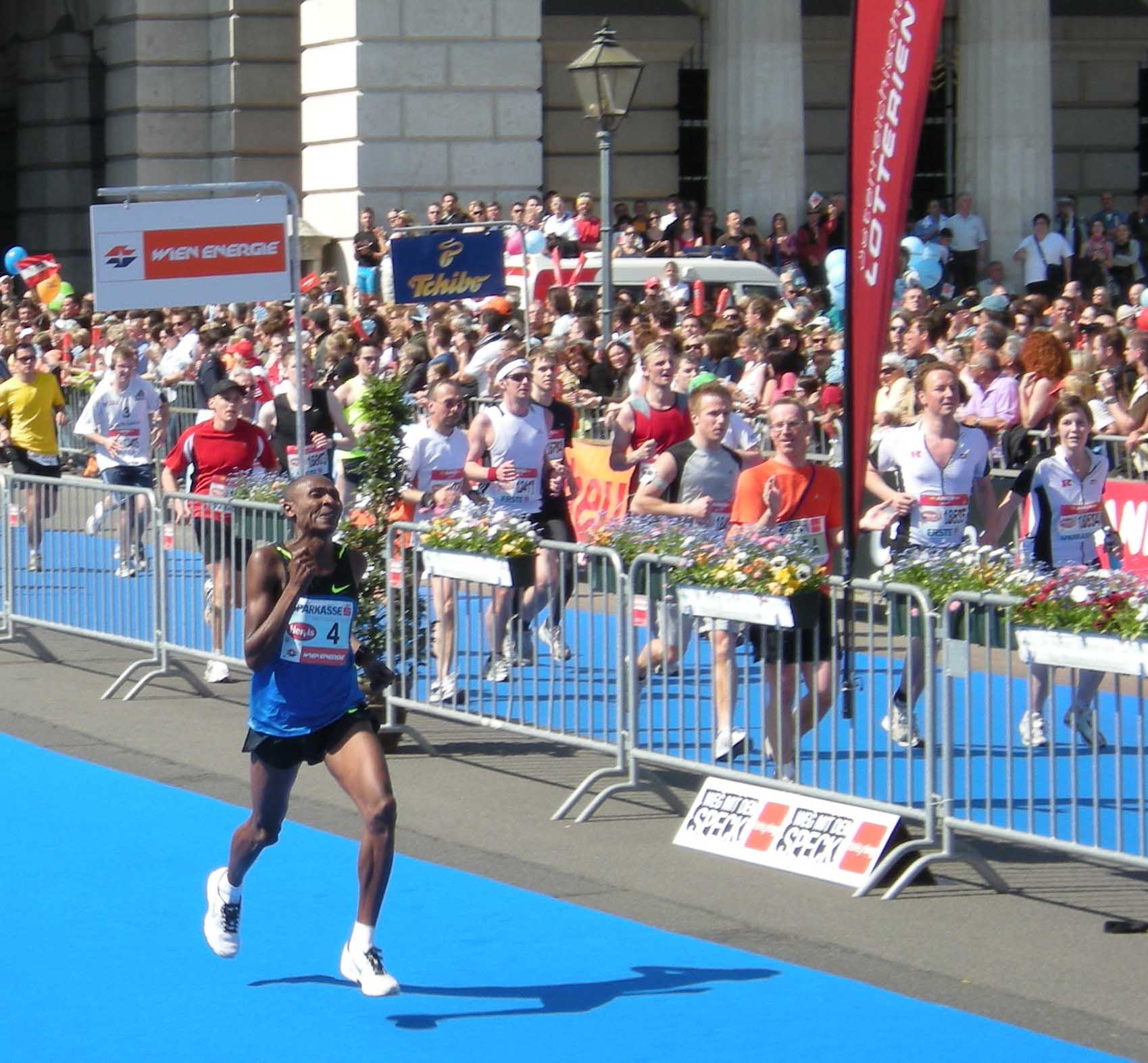
- Maregu at the 2009 Vienna City Marathon

Medal record

Men's athletics

Representing Kenya

IAAF World Half Marathon Championships
Gold medal – first place	2008 Rio	Team

Joseph Nganga Maregu (born 22 November 1977) is a Kenyan long-distance runner who competes in road running events from 10K to the marathon. A journeyman competitor on the roads, he made only one international appearance at the 2008 IAAF World Half Marathon Championships, taking ninth place and a team gold medal with Kenya.

Active between 2004 and 2014, he initially focused on 10K and half marathon races and won a number of low level French competitions. His highest standard victories came at the Lille Half Marathon (2006 and 2007) and the Paris Half Marathon (2007). His lifetime best of 59:45 minutes came during his second win in Lille. He ran his first marathon in Kenya in 2006, but his debut time of 2:24:18 hours was slow. He turned to marathon running proper in 2009, taking third at the Vienna City Marathon in a time of 2:09:25 hours. This was to be his best however and in five subsequent outings he did not better two hours and ten minutes. He had his last road win in 2010 at the Olomouc Half Marathon.

== International competitions ==
Year	Competition	Venue	Position	Event	Notes
2008	World Half Marathon Championships	Rio de Janeiro	9th	Half marathon	1:03:32
2008	World Half Marathon Championships	Rio de Janeiro	1st	Team	3:07:24

== Circuit wins ==
- Olomouc Half Marathon: 2010
- Lille Half Marathon: 2006, 2007
- Paris Half Marathon: 2007
- 15 km du Puy-en-Velay: 2007
- Paris-Versailles: 2007, 2008

== Personal bests ==
- 10K run – 27:43 min (2009)
- Half Marathon – 59:45 min (2007)
- Marathon – 2:09:25 (2009)
