= Stephen Kipkoech Kibiwott =

Kenyan long-distance runner (born 1980)

Medal record

Men's athletics

Representing Kenya

IAAF World Half Marathon Championships
Gold medal – first place	2008 Rio	Team

Stephen Kipkoech Kibiwott (born 3 April 1980) is a Kenyan long-distance runner who competes in marathons and half marathons. He came fourth at the 2008 IAAF World Half Marathon Championships and shared in the team gold medal.

Kibiwott began competing on the European professional road running circuit in 2006 after a top three finish at the Eldoret Half Marathon. He won both the Prague Half Marathon and Turin Marathon that same year and was runner-up at the Alexander the Great Marathon. He was much less success in 2007, failing to finish the London and Prague Marathons, then finishing 28th at the Frankfurt Marathon. He returned to form in 2008 with wins at the Paris Half Marathon and another victory in Turin. His runner-up finish in a personal best of 59:44 minutes at the Lille Half Marathon secured his selection for Kenya at the 2008 IAAF World Half Marathon Championships, where he came fourth.

He had the best year of his career in 2009, setting personal bests of 59:37 minutes for the half marathon (winning in Lille), and 2:07:54 hours for the marathon (while runner-up at the Prague International Marathon). In his Asian debut, he came third at the JoongAng Seoul Marathon. He did not finish the 2011 Boston Marathon and despite quick times that year only managed one top three finish – doing so in Lille with a season's best of 60:23 minutes. He entered the 2012 Dubai Marathon and recorded 2:08:11 hours (his second fastest run), but was only 15th in the high quality race. He continued to run marathons, but failed to break two hours and ten minutes again. In the subsequent three seasons he only had one top three finish (runner-up at the 2013 Lodz Marathon in 2:10:04 hours).

== International competitions ==
Year	Competition	Venue	Position	Event	Notes
2008	World Half Marathon Championships	Rio de Janeiro	4th	Half marathon	1:01:58
2008	World Half Marathon Championships	Rio de Janeiro	1st	Team	3:07:24

== Circuit wins ==
- Turin Marathon: 2006, 2008
- Prague Half Marathon: 2006
- Paris Half Marathon: 2008
- Lille Half Marathon: 2009

== Personal bests ==
- 10K run – 28:18 min (2010)
- Half Marathon – 59:37 min (2009)
- Marathon – 2:07:54 (2009)
