= Run London =

Run London (2001–2010) was an annual 10 km run (or series of runs), organised by Nike and held within London, UK. The events are unique in having different themes and marketing campaigns each year.

== Events ==
=== 2001 - Kew Gardens ===
The run took place on Sunday 22 July with approximately 10,000 runners taking part, all wearing pink running shirts.

=== 2002 - Richmond Park ===
The theme of the run was based upon the Chicken and the Egg, with the slogans "Which came first?" and "I'll do it if you do it." The run took place on Sunday 22 September and approximately 20,000 runners all clad in yellow nike T-shirts took part.

=== 2003 - Richmond Park ===
The run took place on Sunday 7 September. The theme revolved around runners choosing one of three available virtual coaches: Paula, O'Keefe and Carter, each with their own unique style and set of slogans. Paula, based on Paula Radcliffe, was a dedicated and serious athlete who wanted runners to be like her and push the boundaries at every opportunity. Carter, a long haired and bearded hippy, was the 'holistic' runner who wanted runners to love running and running to love them. O'Keefe, a militarian figure armed with a megaphone, was a hard man who did not suffer fools in his training, he claimed to not let runners stop until they had shed blood, sweat and tears.

The run's T-shirts were light blue with the image and slogan of the runner's chosen coach, as were the finishing medals. An estimated 30,000 runners participated.

=== 2004 - Nocturnal ===
The theme of the run was to "Go Nocturnal" and took place on the streets of London on the night of Sunday 28 November. 30,000 runners, wearing luminous yellow long-sleeved running tops braved the near winter conditions on a route that started in Surrey Quays shopping centre, through Bermondsey, along the River Thames, turning on Tower Bridge, before ending in Southwark Park. The award-winning integrated advertising campaign was by Wieden and Kennedy and was created by Sean Thompson, Matt Follows and Chris Groom.

=== 2005 - All Year ===
This year's slogan was "I will run a year" with Nike arranging for runs to take place throughout the year in a range of different parks and routes.

==== Main Run ====
The main 10K run took place simultaneously in Battersea, Hyde and Victoria parks on Sunday 16 October. An estimated 35,000 runners took part, all wearing bright red T-shirts. The race is 2nd in popularity after the London British 10K.

==== Run November ====
Run November was a 5K run through Crystal Palace park finishing at Crystal Palace Athletics stadium. It took place on Sunday 27 November, and given the temperature and location it was no surprise that the attendance was a fraction of that for the main run.

==== Run January ====
Run January took place on 29 January in Regents Park. It was a series of 5k runs one every half an hour between 10 and 1pm.

Run March

Run March was in Gunnersbury Park, West London on 26 March, the day the clocks were put forward from GMT to BST. This was a 5K event with two laps of a loop in the course before a long run out to the finish, similar to a figure 6.

Run May

Run May was another 5K timed event taking place in Victoria Park, East London on 21 May.

Run July

The final chapter in the Run London "Run A Year" series. Finsbury Park was the setting for the last 5K, held on 16 July in the hot summer of 2006. Paula Radcliffe supported the event by competing and signing numerous T-shirts at the finish.

"I Ran A Year"

Runners who completed 4 of the 5 courses received a commemorative T-shirt with the logo "I Ran A Year" on the front and the number " 3 6 5 " on the rear.

=== 2006 - North Vs South ===
This year's event consisted of runners from the North and the South of London competing against each other around a 10k circuit in London's Hyde Park. The average time was calculated for all runners in both teams to determine the winner. The race was held in four waves: wave one starting at 10.15, wave two at 11.05, wave three at 11.55 and wave four at 12.45. The winning team was the South, with an average time of 56 minutes 09 seconds. The average time for the North was 56 m 26secs.

=== 2007 - no race ===
This year's event was skipped with the tagline:

"What becomes of a habit stops being a challenge. So it's a year off for Run London. A year of running your way."

=== 2008 - London Vs The World ===
The 2008 race was launched with the tagline -

"You ran at night
You ran a year
You ran for your side of the river
now its time to take your 10k global
Race the world on Aug 31, 2008."

=== 2009 - no race ===
This year's event was skipped with the tagline:

"What becomes of a habit stops being a challenge. So it's a year off for Run London. A year of running your way."
