= Javier Díaz (athlete) =

Spanish long-distance runner (born 1976)

Javier Díaz (born 11 April 1976) is a Spanish long-distance runner. He competed at the 2010 European Athletics Championships in the men's marathon.
