= Zenebu Fikadu =

Ethiopian long-distance runner

Personal information
- Born: 14 September 1999 (age 26)

Sport
- Country: Ethiopia
- Sport: Long-distance running

Zenebu Fikadu (born 14 September 1999) is an Ethiopian long-distance runner. In 2019, she competed in the senior women's race at the 2019 IAAF World Cross Country Championships held in Aarhus, Denmark. She finished in 10th place in 37:24 but won the team title.

In January 2018 she placed 5th at the Safi half-marathon (Morocco) in 1:13:34.

In June 2019 she got 3rd place at the Valencia 15km Banco Mediolanum (Spain) in 49:15. In October she finished 2nd at the Corrida de Villejuif (France) in 31:44, and once again 2nd the following month at the cross "Le Maine Libre" in Allonnes (France) in 19:33.

The same year she won the women's race in 26:44 at the Cross Internacional de Venta de Baños (7,575km) held in Venta de Baños, Castile and León, Spain.

In November 2021, in San Sebastian (Spain) she won a stage of the World Athletics Cross Country Tour: she ran the 7,6 km course in 25:27.

In March 2022, she won the women's half marathon in Lille (France) and set a new course record in 1:06:57. Two months later, she placed third at the Barcelona (Spain) marathon in 2:25:09.
