= Paris-Versailles Race =

Annual pedestrian race in France

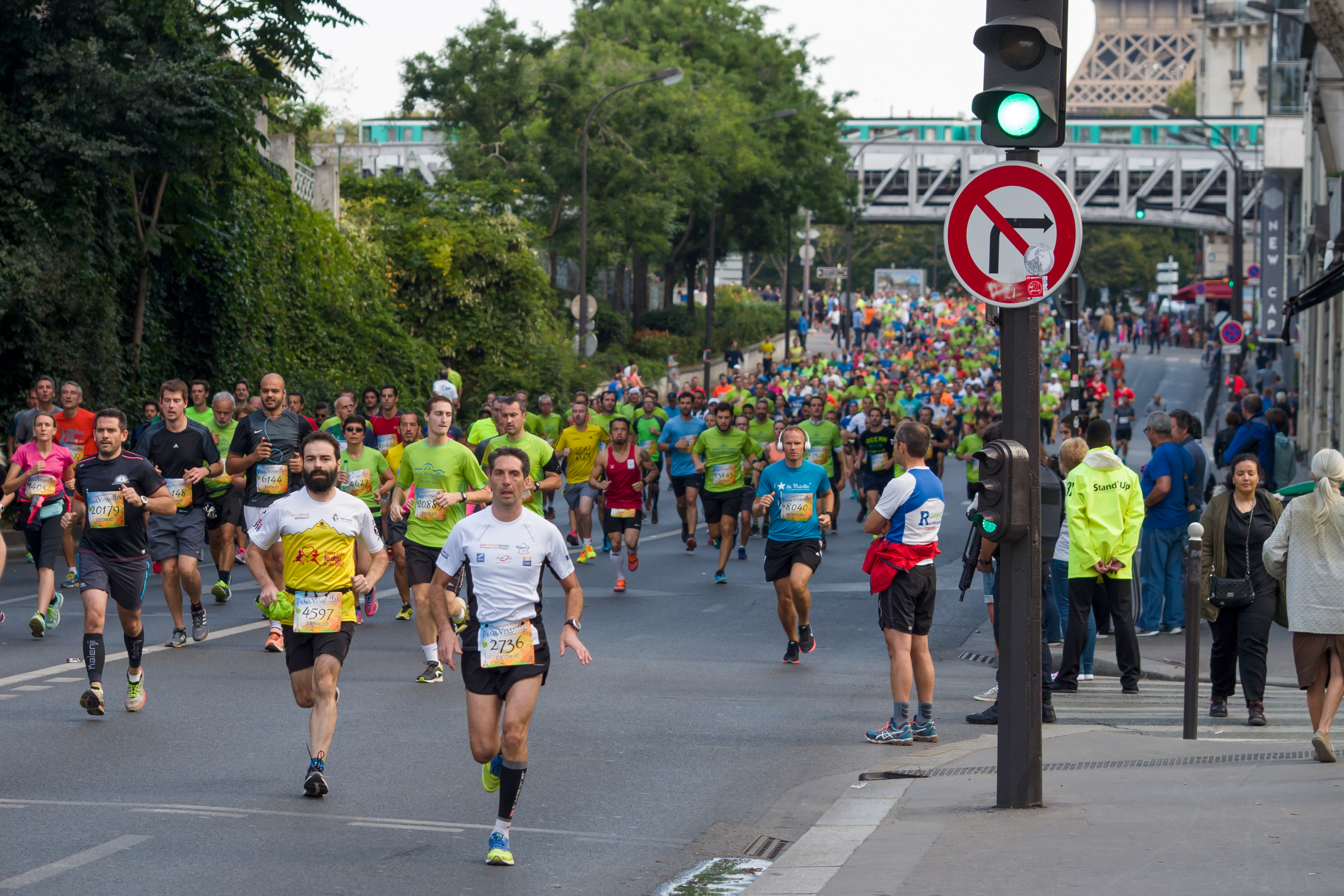
Course Paris-Versailles 2016

The Paris-Versailles Race (Course Paris-Versailles, also known as La Grande Classique) is a pedestrian race that takes place between Paris and Versailles in France, every year on the last Sunday morning of September. Organized by Paris-Versailles Association, it takes place on a course of 16 km, from the foot of the Eiffel Tower to the Palace of Versailles, via Issy-les-Moulineaux, Meudon, Chaville, Vélizy-Villacoublay, Viroflay and Meudon.

The 40th anniversary race took place on 24 September 2017 More than 22,000 runners participated in the race, whose winners were Ethiopian runners Getinet Gedamu and Chaltu-Dida Negasa.

== Course Details ==
The race is noted for its unusual and demanding course through seven communities from the Eiffel Tower to the Palace of Versailles, running uphill for most of its length and finishing more than 100 meters higher than the start. After 6 km very flat along the Seine, the route takes the famous coast of the Gardes. This section has a slope of up to 9% and is over 2km long making it the most difficult part of the race. The last 2 km are also feared because they run on the Avenue de Paris, a very wide double track (and therefore generally windy) in false flat which is often described as endless.

Race Breakdown:

- Departure from Eiffel Tower,
- Issy-les-Moulineaux, by the banks of the Seine,
- Meudon, with the Côte des Gardes and its forest route,
- Chaville, at the bottom of the descent of the funds of the chapel,
- Velizy and Viroflay, a long straight hilly section with undergrowth,
- Arrival at the Palace of Versailles.
