= List of winners of the Taipei Marathon =

The Taipei Marathon is an annual long-distance marathon event in Asia that has been held since 1986. World Athletics has certified it as an Elite Label road race.

Kenyan long distance runner Paul Lonyangata won the 2020 race and set a course record of 2:09:18. Ethiopian marathoner Alemtsehay Asifa won the race twice in 2021 and 2022, and currently holds the course record of 2:25:55.

== Winners ==
Key

Current course record
Course record

=== Men's open division ===
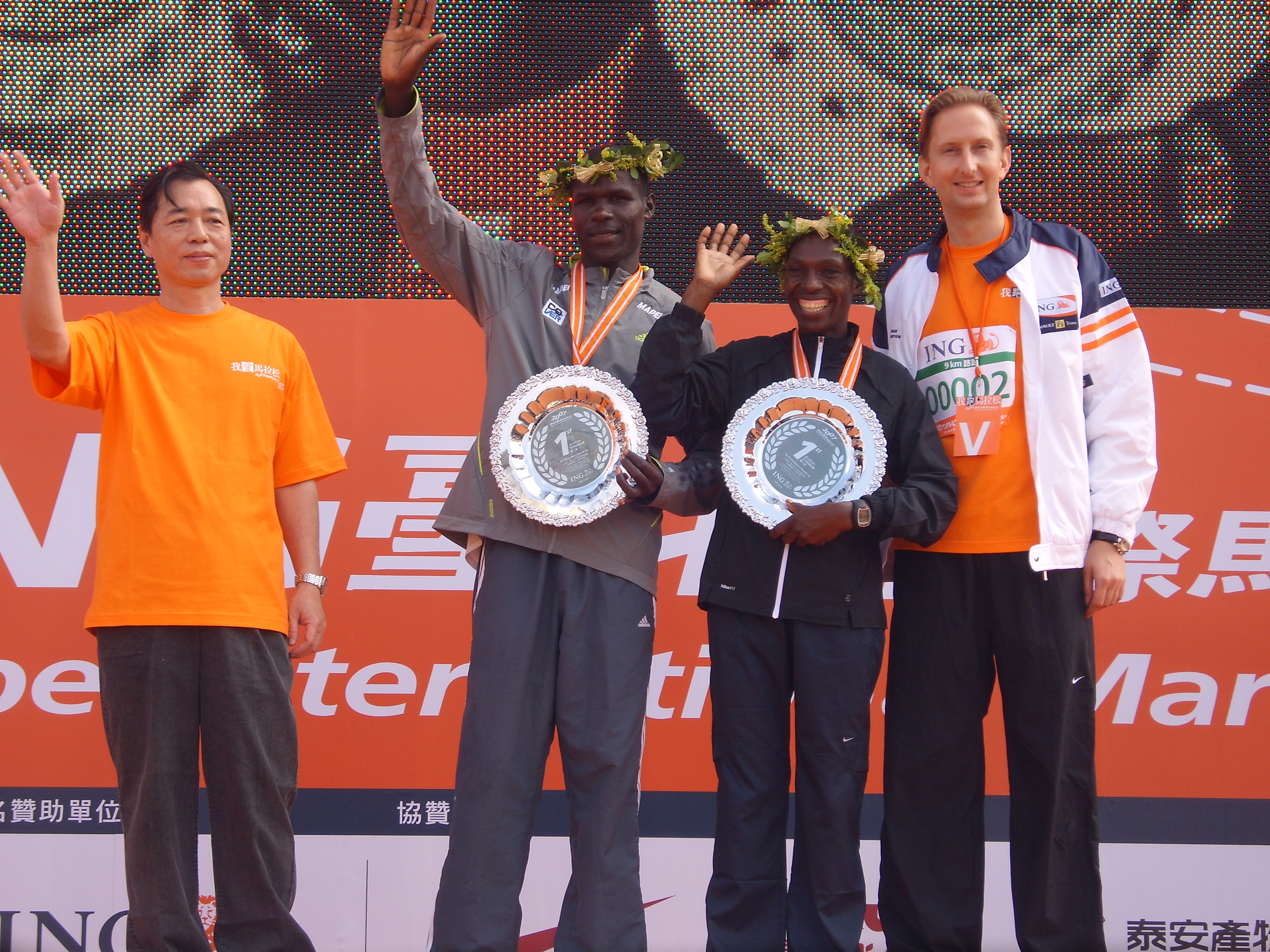
Kenyan Hillary Bett and Zimbabwean Tabitha Tsatsa won the race at the 2007 Taipei Marathon, respectively.

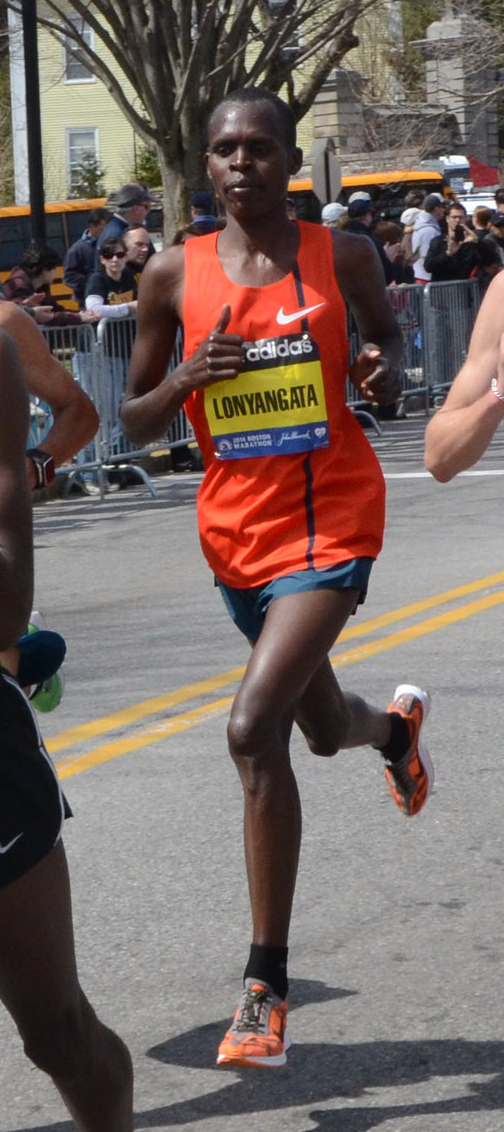
Paul Lonyangata holds the current course record, 2:09:18, set in 2020.

Winners: Men's open division
Year	Winner	Country	Time	Distance	Notes
1989	Komatsu Okaiku	Japan	2:16:56	26.2 miles (42.2 km)	
2001	Vladimir Kotov	Belarus	2:21:37	26.2 miles (42.2 km)	
2002	Mluleki Nobanda	South Africa	2:14:38	26.2 miles (42.2 km)	
2003	Wu Wen-chien	Chinese Taipei	2:22:41	26.2 miles (42.2 km)	
2004	Wilson Chelal	Kenya	2:14:52	26.2 miles (42.2 km)	
2005	Luke Kibet	Kenya	2:11:54	26.2 miles (42.2 km)	
2006	Luke Kibet	Kenya	2:11:05	26.2 miles (42.2 km)	Course record, second victory
2007	Hillary Bett	Kenya	2:17:09	26.2 miles (42.2 km)	
2008	Sammy Chumba	Kenya	2:15:37	26.2 miles (42.2 km)	
2009	Gebreselassie Tsegay	Ethiopia	2:15:57	26.2 miles (42.2 km)	
2010	Yusuf Songoka	Kenya	2:14:04	26.2 miles (42.2 km)	
2011	Yemane Tsegay	Ethiopia	2:10:24	26.2 miles (42.2 km)	Course record
2012	Josphat Kamzee	Kenya	2:15:27	26.2 miles (42.2 km)	
2013	Josphat Kamzee	Kenya	2:14:10	26.2 miles (42.2 km)	Second victory
2014	Julius Chepkwony	Kenya	2:14:04	26.2 miles (42.2 km)	
2015	William Chebor	Kenya	2:16:15	26.2 miles (42.2 km)	
2016	Sammy Kitwara	Kenya	2:09:59	26.2 miles (42.2 km)	
2017	Abraham Kiprotich	France	2:17:50	26.2 miles (42.2 km)	
2018	Aredom Degefa	Ethiopia	2:16:59	26.2 miles (42.2 km)	
2019	Kenneth Mburu Mungara	Kenya	2:14:54	26.2 miles (42.2 km)	
2020	Paul Lonyangata	Kenya	2:09:18	26.2 miles (42.2 km)	Course record
2021	Demeke Kasaw	Ethiopia	2:11:42	26.2 miles (42.2 km)	
2022	Lani Rutto	Kenya	2:09:42	26.2 miles (42.2 km)	
2023	Dechasa Alemu	Ethiopia	2:11:56		

=== Women's open division ===
Winners: Women's open division
Year	Winner	Country	Time	Distance	Notes
2001	Larissa Zyuzko	Russia	2:46:07	26.2 miles (42.2 km)	
2002	Anfisa Kosacheva	Russia	2:36:25	26.2 miles (42.2 km)	
2003	Hu Xiuying	China	2:41:41	26.2 miles (42.2 km)	
2004	Jennifer Chesinon	Kenya	2:34:14	26.2 miles (42.2 km)	
2005	Jane Ekimat	Kenya	2:33:39	26.2 miles (42.2 km)	
2006	Jane Ekimat	Kenya	2:30:56	26.2 miles (42.2 km)	Second victory
2007	Tabitha Tsatsa	Zimbabwe	2:33:01	26.2 miles (42.2 km)	
2008	Caroline Kilel	Kenya	2:30:44	26.2 miles (42.2 km)	
2009	Yeshi Esayias	Ethiopia	2:30:05	26.2 miles (42.2 km)	
2010	Yeshi Esayias	Ethiopia	2:30:37	26.2 miles (42.2 km)	Second victory
2011	Helena Kirop	Kenya	2:27:36	26.2 miles (42.2 km)	Course record
2012	Caroline Kilel	Kenya	2:30:19	26.2 miles (42.2 km)	Second victory
2013	Rebecca Chesire	Kenya	2:33:20	26.2 miles (42.2 km)	
2014	Alice Timbilil	Kenya	2:34:55	26.2 miles (42.2 km)	
2015	Nancy Rotich	Kenya	2:36:42	26.2 miles (42.2 km)	
2016	Mercy Kibarus	Kenya	2:36:33	26.2 miles (42.2 km)	
2017	Leah Kiprono	Kenya	2:45:52	26.2 miles (42.2 km)	
2018	Jo Un-ok	North Korea	2:29:48	26.2 miles (42.2 km)	
2019	Antonina Kwambai	Kenya	2:31:27	26.2 miles (42.2 km)	
2020	Askale Merachi	Ethiopia	2:28:31	26.2 miles (42.2 km)	
2021	Alemtsehay Asifa	Ethiopia	2:30:44	26.2 miles (42.2 km)	
2022	Alemtsehay Asifa	Ethiopia	2:25:55	26.2 miles (42.2 km)	Course record, second victory
2023	Obse Abdeta	Ethiopia	2:27:14	26.2 miles (42.2 km)	

== Victories by nationality ==
Victories by nationality
Country	Open division		Wheelchair division		Total
Country	Men's	Women's	Men's	Women's	Total
Belarus	1	—N/a	—N/a	—N/a	1
China	—N/a	1	—N/a	—N/a	1
Ethiopia	5	6	—N/a	—N/a	11
France	1	—N/a	—N/a	—N/a	1
Japan	1	—N/a	—N/a	—N/a	1
Kenya	14	12	—N/a	—N/a	26
Russia	—N/a	2	—N/a	—N/a	2
North Korea	—N/a	1	—N/a	—N/a	1
South Africa	1	—N/a	—N/a	—N/a	1
Taiwan	1	—N/a	—N/a	—N/a	1
Zimbabwe	—N/a	1	—N/a	—N/a	1
