= Helena Kirop =

Kenyan long-distance runner (born 1976)

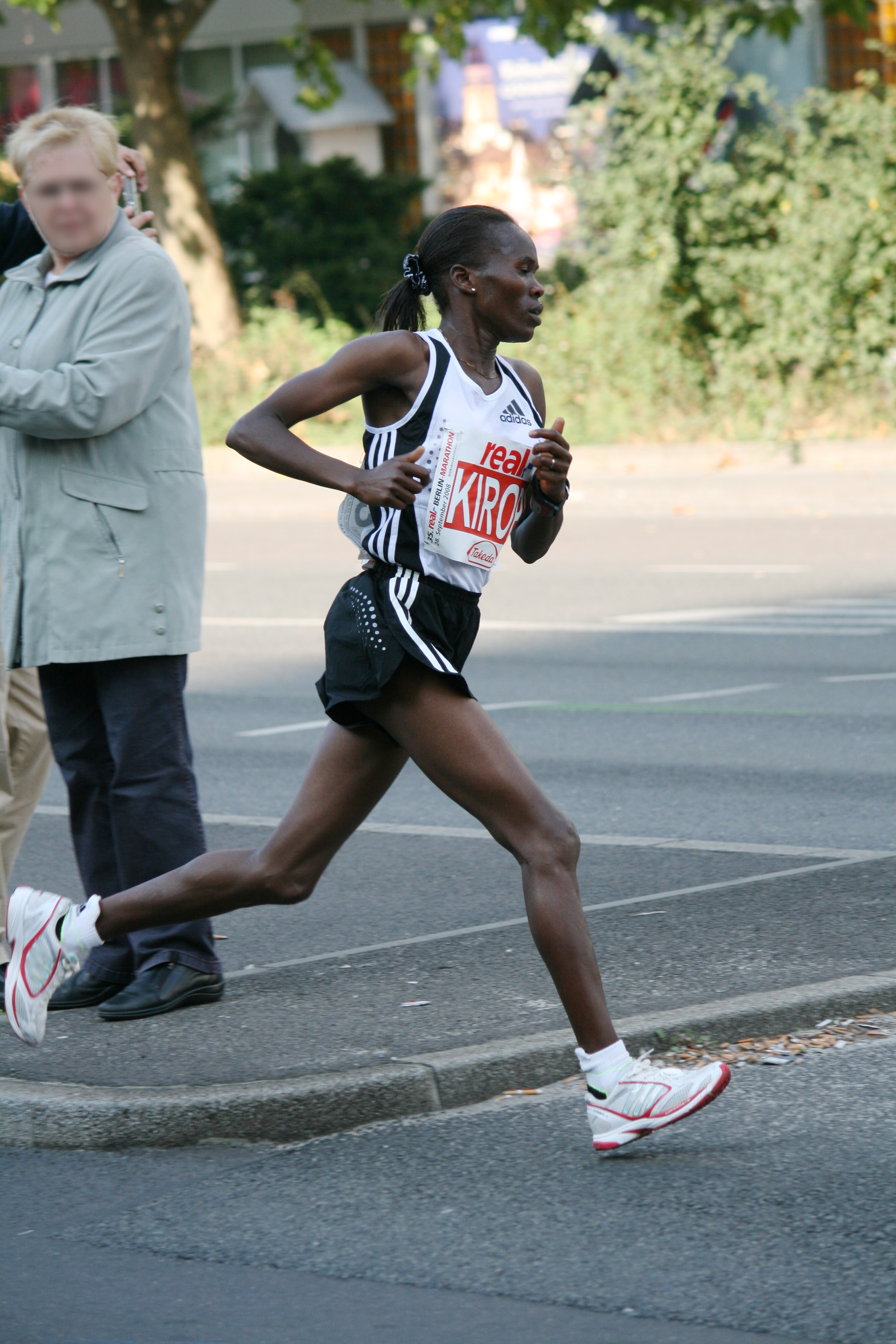
Kirop running at the 2008 Berlin Marathon, where she came third.

Helena Loshanyang Kirop (born 9 September 1976) is a Kenyan long-distance runner who specialises in marathon running. Her personal best for the distance is 2:23:37 hours (set in 2011) and she has won the Prague International Marathon and Venice Marathon.

Kirop was the runner-up at the 2006 Amsterdam Marathon and the 2007 Rotterdam Marathon and has had top three finishes at the Berlin Marathon and Dubai Marathon. She represented Kenya in the marathon at the World Championships in Athletics in 2009.

She is the head of the Helena Kirop Foundation, a charitable organisation aiming to provide education to girls in poor families in the Turkana and Pokot communities.

== Career ==
Born in Kapenguria, West Pokot District, she did not compete at a high level of the sport when she was young. In 2004, she and her husband, Peter Lomuria, agreed that they would move to Eldoret so that Kirop could begin training. The couple had two children and were both out of work and she noticed the wealth that marathon running could bring to Kenyan athletes. She began to compete in European road running competitions from 2005 onwards. Managed by Gianni Demadonna, Kirop made her debut over the marathon in 2006 and quickly established herself with a debut win at the Casablanca Marathon. She took third place at the Ottawa Marathon then set a significant personal best of 2:28:51 hours to finish as runner-up behind Rose Cheruiyot at the 2006 Amsterdam Marathon.

In her second year of marathon running, she was second at the Rotterdam Marathon and improved her best further at the Berlin Marathon, where she came third in a time of 2:26:27 hours. Kirop returned to the Berlin race in 2008 and although she was third for a second year running, she again bettered her time with a run of 2:25:01 hours. At the 2009 Dubai Marathon she ran the second fastest time of her career (2:25:35) in spite of rainy conditions and finished in third place behind Ethiopians Bezunesh Bekele and Atsede Habtamu. She made her debut at the Boston Marathon that April, but this outing was less successful than her one in Dubai as she finished in fifth place.

Kirop was selected for the women's marathon at the 2009 World Championships in Athletics – she remained among the leading pack at the 25K mark, but slowed thereafter and eventually dropped out of the race altogether. She decided upon a late entry into the Portugal Half Marathon in October and she was rewarded with a win over local opposition in Ana Dulce Félix and Marisa Barros. Her year ended with a win at the Shoe4Africa 5K in Iten, which she had only entered as a training exercise to improve her speed.

A month later she ran a personal best of 2:24:54 hours for the marathon, coming third again at the Dubai race. After a third-place finish at the Stramilano Half Marathon, she ran a course record of 2:25:29 to win at the 2010 Prague International Marathon – a minute faster than the previous mark and two minutes ahead of the runner-up Alevtina Ivanova.

Kirop managed only ninth place at the 2011 Dubai Marathon and was sixth in spite of her time of 1:09:50 at the highly competitive Lisbon Half Marathon in March. She was second to Mary Keitany at the 2011 Portugal Half Marathon and ran a time of 1:08:57 hours (a new personal best). A best in the marathon followed in October at the Venice Marathon, where her time of 2:23:37 hours on the hilly course improved the race record by over three minutes. Another course record run came at the Taipei Marathon in December, as she knocked almost two and a half minutes off Yeshi Esayias' former mark.

A run of 2:26:00 hours at the 2012 Tokyo Marathon in February left her in third place behind Esayias. Her best run that year came at the Cologne Marathon, where her time of 2:25:34 hours was a course record. Another win came at the 2013 Rome City Marathon, where she was slightly faster with a time of 2:24:40 hours.
