= 2022 Taipei Marathon =

Annual marathon race in Taipei, Taiwan

26th Taipei Marathon
- Main visual of the race
- Venue: Taipei, Taiwan
- Date: December 18, 2022

Champions
- Men: Lani Kiplagat Rutto (KEN) (2:09:42)
- Women: Alemtsehay Asifa Kasegn (ETH) (2:25:55)
- Wheelchair men: Kuo Wen-sheng (TWN) (1:47:24)
- Wheelchair women: Chen Yu-lien (TWN) (2:10:44)

The 2022 Taipei Marathon (Chinese: 2022年臺北馬拉松) was an Elite Label marathon race held in Taipei, Taiwan on December 18, 2022. It is the 26th running of the race.

In this edition of the race, half marathon added wheelchair demonstration for the first time, invited 15 domestic para athletes to join.

== Background ==
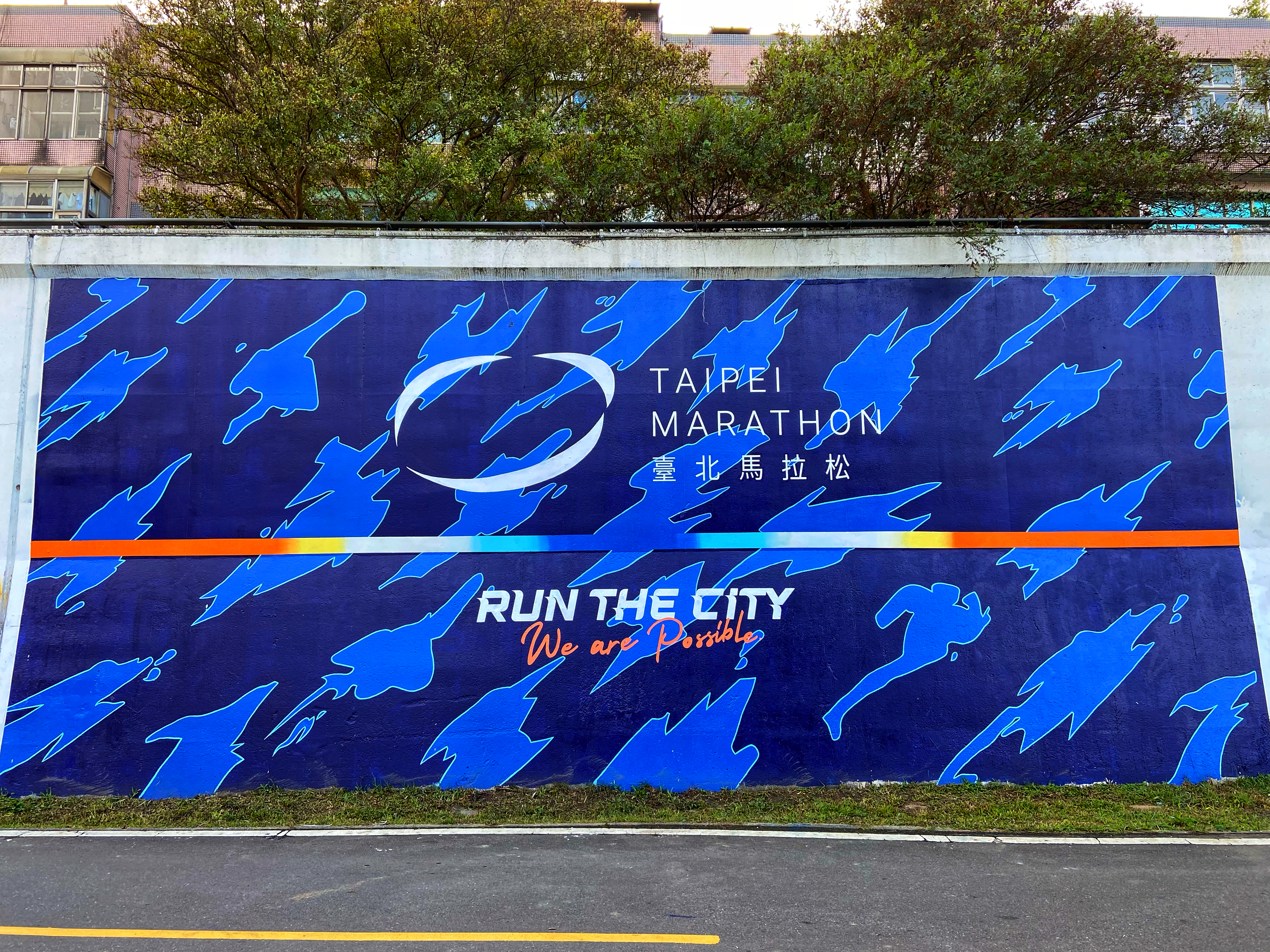
The race's main visual graffiti at Guanshan Riverside Park

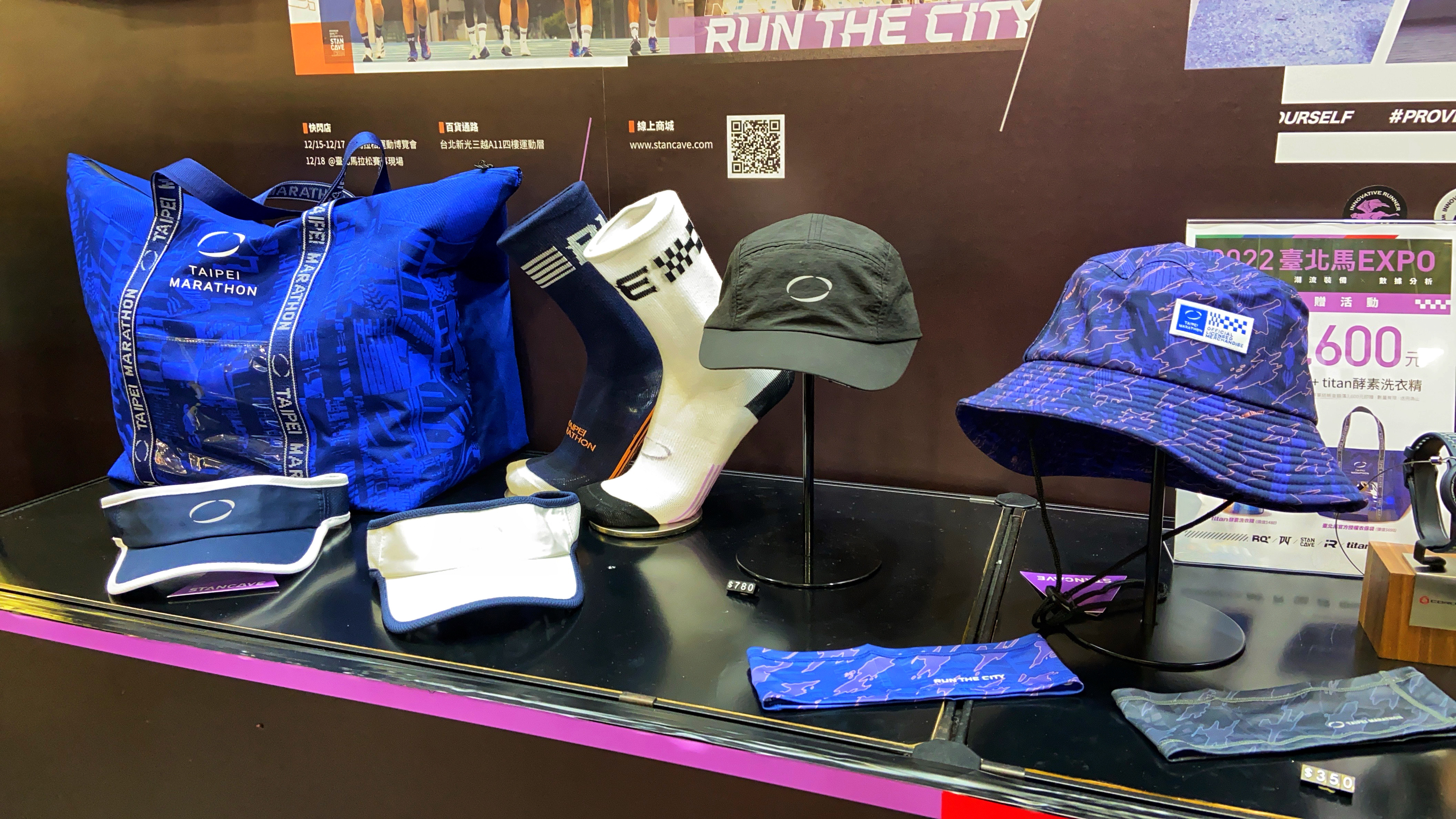
Official merchandise

The slogan of the race is "Run the city, we are possible" and been announced on its official Facebook in August 2022.

On August 29, 2022, the race officially opens its registration at the press conference, the field is limited to 28,000 runners. Rendy Lu, retired Taiwanese professional tennis player, will also join the half marathon as the race ambassador.

=== Prize ===
Ranking/ Group	Marathon Unit: USD	Half marathon Unit: NTD
Champion	US$26,667 (Note: If set a new course record, the prize money will rise to US$60,000.) (Note: Taipei Marathon's course records are below: Men's marathon: Paul Lonyangata (KEN) 2:09:18 Women's marathon: Helena Kirop (KEN) 2:27:36)	NT$25,000
2nd	US$8,333	NT$15,000
3rd	US$5,000	NT$10,000
4th	US$3,000	—
5th	US$2,000	—
6th	US$1,500	—
7th	US$1,000	—
8th	US$500	—
9th	US$333	—
10th	US$167	—

=== Elite runners ===
Ethiopian long-distance runners Demeke Kasaw Biksegn and Alemtsehay Asifa Kasegn are both returned as reigning champion this year. Biksegn finishing the race with a time of 2:11:42 last year.

International invited athletes
Men's elite	Nationality	Personal Best
Lani Kiplagat Rutto	Kenya	2:06:34
Edwin Kiptoo	Kenya	2:06:52
Thomas Kibet Kutere	Kenya	2:08:47
Alfonce Kibiwott Kigen	Kenya	2:09:49
Demeke Kasaw Biksegn	Ethiopia	2:12:12
Aragaw Yitbarek Meseret	Ethiopia	2:14:39
Women's elite	Nationality	Personal Best
Ayantu Abera Demissie	Ethiopia	2:28:35
Alemtsehay Asifa Kasegn	Ethiopia	2:32:00
Lilian Jelagat	Kenya	2:27:39
Naomy Chepkorir Tuei	Kenya	2:27:37
Galbadrakhyn Khishigsaikhan	Mongolia	2:32:09
Hanna Lindholm	Sweden	2:28:59

Domestic athletes
Men's elite	Personal Best
Chiang Chieh-wen	2:18:17
Chou Ting-yin	2:23:13
Huang Wei-hen	2:28:46
Tsai Cheng-hsuan	2:30:07
Wen Lien-chung	2:30:42
Teng Hsin-chuan	2:32:07
Yang Yung-chun	2:32:50
Women's elite	Personal Best
Chang Chih-hsuan	2:46:36
Tsai Yun-hsuan	2:52:20
Li Chia-mei	2:27:39
Chen Yi-ning	2:53:18
Lisa Ries	2:56:01
Chu Ying-ying	2:56:49

== Results ==
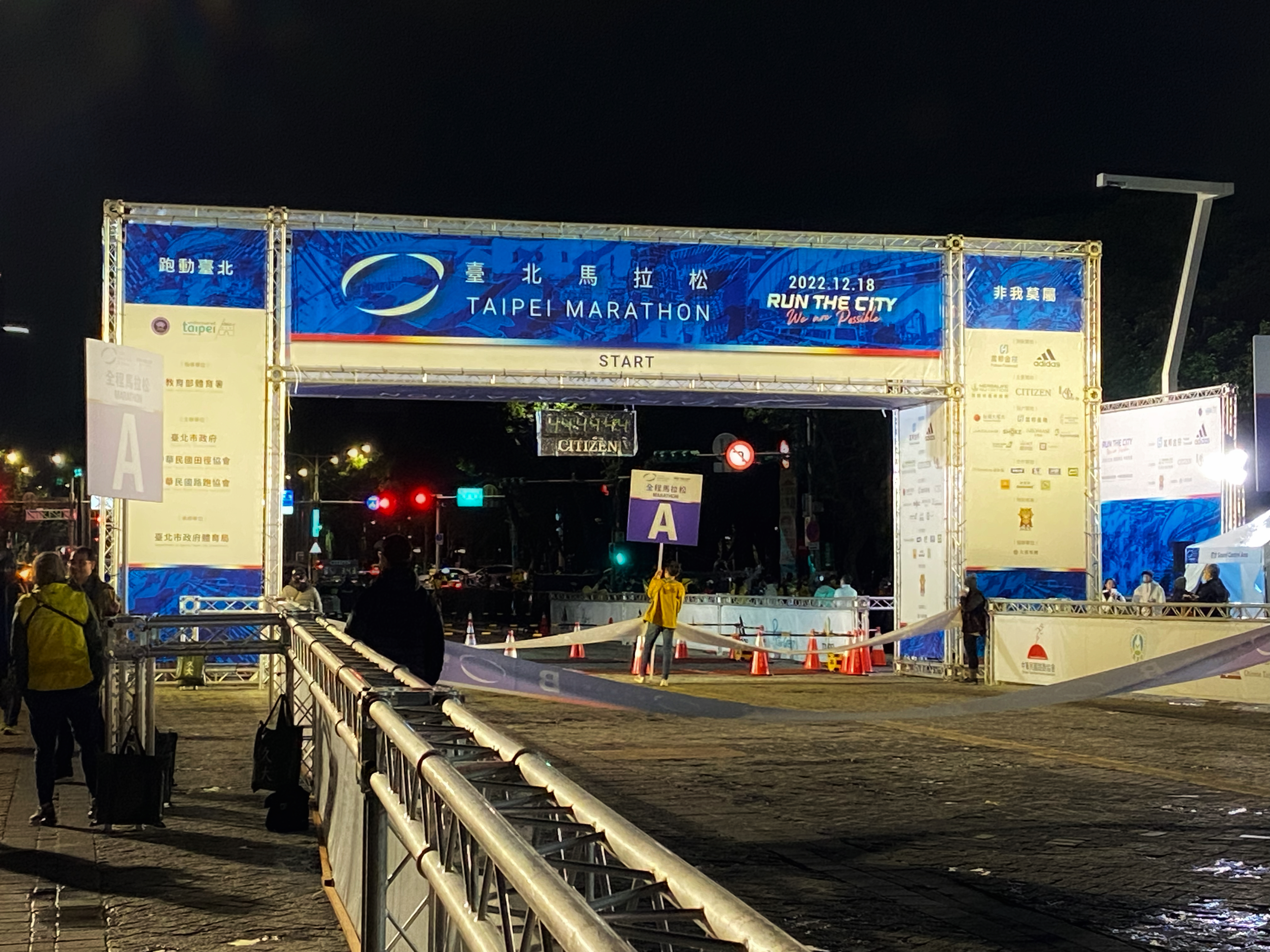
Start point

=== Marathon ===
Elite men's top 10 finishers
Place	Athlete	Time (h:m:s)
1st place, gold medalist(s)	Lani Kiplagat Rutto (KEN)	2:09:42
2nd place, silver medalist(s)	Thomas Kibet Kutere (KEN)	2:10:59
3rd place, bronze medalist(s)	Aragaw Yitbarek Meseret (ETH)	2:11:34
4	Edwin Kiptoo (KEN)	2:11:50
5	Demeke Kasaw Biksegn (ETH)	2:13:37
6	Chiang Chieh-wen (TWN)	2:25:53
7	Yeh Jih-hung (TWN)	2:28:06 PB
8	Tan Huong-leong (MAS)	2:28:23
9	Chou Ting-yin (TWN)	2:28:40
10	Ngai Kang (HKG)	2:29:19

Elite women's top 10 finishers
Place	Athlete	Time (h:m:s)
1st place, gold medalist(s)	Alemtsehay Asifa Kasegn (ETH)	2:25:55 MR
2nd place, silver medalist(s)	Lilian Jelagat (KEN)	2:30:13
3rd place, bronze medalist(s)	Galbadrakhyn Khishigsaikhan (MNG)	2:32:23
4	Naomy Chepkorir Tuei (KEN)	2:33:27
5	Hanna Lindholm (SWE)	2:33:35
6	Lisa Ries (TWN)	2:40:54 PB
7	Chang Chih-hsuan (TWN)	2:48:14
8	Chen Yi-ning (TWN)	2:50:52 PB
9	Chen Ya-fen (TWN)	2:51:54
10	Tsai Yun-hsuan (TWN)	2:52:48

=== Half marathon ===
Elite men's top 10 finishers
Place	Athlete	Time (h:m:s)
1st place, gold medalist(s)	Chou Hsien-feng (TWN)	1:06:58 PB
2nd place, silver medalist(s)	Shih Yu-zuo (TWN)	1:07:25
3rd place, bronze medalist(s)	Wong Kai Lok (HKG)	1:07:41 PB
4	Vincent Leslie Lam (HKG)	1:07:47
5	Tseng Ting-wei (TWN)	1:08:35
6	Wei Guan-yu (TWN)	1:08:46
7	Chiang Ying-wei (TWN)	1:08:50
8	Huang Hsiang-wei (TWN)	1:08:51
9	Chou Hung-yu (TWN)	1:09:02
10	Chiang Yen-lun (TWN)	1:09:09

Elite women's top 10 finishers
Place	Athlete	Time (h:m:s)
1st place, gold medalist(s)	Tsao Chun-yu (TWN)	1:14:17
2nd place, silver medalist(s)	Lo Ying-chiu (HKG)	1:17:26 PB
3rd place, bronze medalist(s)	Lok Yu-tong (HKG)	1:19:57
4	You Ya-jyun (TWN)	1:21:57
5	Sze Wai-wen (HKG)	1:22:42
6	Lo Pei-chi (TWN)	1:23:17
7	Cheng Chun-chih (TWN)	1:23:41
8	Shen Ni (TWN)	1:25:26
9	Yang Chiao-chu (TWN)	1:26:48
10	Shih Cheng-hsin (TWN)	1:26:58
