= Shoe4Africa 5km =

Women's road running event in Kenya

The Shoe4Africa 5 km is an annual women's road running event over five kilometres that is held on Christmas Eve in the village of Iten, Kenya.

Many world marathon stars have run this event. The 2012 Boston Marathon winner Sharon Cherop came second in the 2006 event and was the 2012 official starter. For Mary Keitany, London Marathon champion 2012, this event was her breakthrough race; finishing one place outside the prize money (21st). Returning home she vowed to train harder and not miss the prize money again. Three, unrelated, world champions; Lornah Kiplagat, Florence Kiplagat, and Edna Kiplagat, have all competed in this race over the last few years. Official starters have included Janeth Jepkosgei, Edna Kiplagat, Mo Farah, Moses Tanui, Moses Kiptanui, Ezekiel Kemboi, Daniel Komen and Phyllis Keino amongst others. Many of the village's elite athletes come out to work and volunteer at this event.

The first edition was run in 2005 when Doris Changeywo won the event that was then a 10 km event, the following year the 5 km distance became standardized. Since its inception the event has become the largest women's only race in Kenya.

The 2006 event coincided with the launch of an HIV/AIDS awareness program, including the opening of a testing centre.

The field is normally capped at 1,100 entrants. In a special peace celebration, the December 2008 event was moved to the Kibera slums in Nairobi, and 5,300 women ran.

The 2011 event was won in a new course record of 16:17 by 2012 Olympian Joyce Chepkirui. The route starts outside the High Altitude Training Center runs towards Iten town before veering off road onto dirt tracks over an extremely hilly loop. The course altitude is at 2345 meters above sea level.

The 2012 Shoe4Africa Women's 5k was held on Christmas Eve and won by Mercy Kibarus. The no entry fee and prize money encourages newcomers as elites. The Shoe4Africa Women's 5k is an important spring board for talented runners in the Rift Valley and has launched the running career of future world champions. The event was won by Mercy Cherotich Kibarus, the 2012 Marseille Cassis Road Race champion. The charity's 2012 event coincided with breaking the ground for the new Shoe4Africa Children's Hospital facility in Eldoret on New Year's Day.

The event was cancelled in 2013 after the race founder, Toby Tanser, suffered head injuries in New York City.

The race resumed in 2014 with Selah Jepleting besting over 950 other women to the line finishing in 16:44.

In 2015, Eunice Chebichii of Nandi County, representing Bahrain won the 10th edition of the Shoe4Africa 5k in 16:24.2 and narrowly missed out on the course record. Defending champion Selah Jepleting finished in 12th place.

== Statistics ==
Top 15 race times
Athlete	Time (min)	Year
Joyce Chepkirui	16:17.07	(2011)
Eunice Chebichii	16:24.2	(2015)
Pascalia Jepkorir	16:27.7	(2015)
Helena Kirop	16:33	(2009)
Rose Kosgei	16:34	(2010)
Alice Timbilil	16:39	(2010)
Caroline Chepkoech	16:41.4	(2011)
Selah Jepleting Busienei	16:44.3	(2014)
Mercy Cherotich Kibarus	16:45.7	(2012)
Gladys Yator	16:46.9	(2015)
Hyvin Kiyeng Jepkemoi	16:47.02	(2011)
Winnie Jepkemoi	16:47.2	(2011)
Eunice Chebichii	16:49.4	(2014)
Janeth Kisa	16:51	(2009)
Helah Kiprop	16:54.5	(2011)

- All timing by Senior National Kenyan coach, IAAF-certified, Joseph K. Ngure
