= Tegla Loroupe Peace Race =

- Date: November
- Location: Kapenguria, Kenya
- Event type: Road
- Distance: 10K
- Established: 2003
- Website: Tegla Loroupe Peace Race

The Tegla Loroupe Peace Race is an annual 10-kilometre road running event which takes place in November in Kapenguria, West Pokot County, Kenya. First held in 2003, the race was created by Kenyan runner Tegla Loroupe to bring together warriors of rival tribes to reduce conflict in the region. The event features separate 10K races for elite long-distance runners and local warriors. There is also a race for children and a VIP race for politicians and dignitaries. The race raises funds for the Tegla Loroupe Peace Foundation, a charitable body focused education, sports and medical issues.

== History ==
The event, created in 2003, was first held in conjunction with the launch of the Tegla Loroupe Peace Foundation. The Peace Race marked an effort by Tegla Loroupe, a prominent long-distance runner and world record holder, to use athletics as a way of promoting unity between rival tribes in the area. Severe droughts and high levels of poverty in the region brought with them increased conflict and cattle rustling, further compounding the population's problems.

Loroupe, whose home town of Kapenguria is the race venue, had personally experienced the problems of the region. "I grew up in a pastoral environment where life was really hard because of the local conflicts between the tribes and people stealing cattle. All of this on top of conditions that were hard to start with", she said, "I was lucky. I had talent and was able to make a success out of running and I felt that I wanted to give things back to the community I grew up in."

The first edition attracted thousands of people, mainly warriors from the Samburu, Marakwet and Pokot Districts of Kenya as well from the neighbouring areas of Karamoja in Uganda and Sudan. Kalie Kurwoi and Cheposera Merisia won the men's and women's 10K warrior races that year. Prizes were offered to the runners: winners earned KSh.25,000/=, runners-up received KSh.15,000/=, while third placers gained KSh.10,000/=. A shorter race was held for children under-12 and another for VIP attendees, which included the Swedish ambassador, the chairman of Athletics Kenya, and Ibrahim Hussein (the first African winner of the New York Marathon).

The race grew in size and achieved much publicity in its first few years. By the third edition it had received support from international organisations such as Amnesty International, Oxfam, and Médecins Sans Frontières. The Peace Race had a significant impact upon the security of the region and the area's Member of Parliament instructed the Kenyan Army that their presence in the previously hostile region was no longer necessary. The race day's events in 2005 included a shared meal between warriors from different tribes within the region, who also provided a demonstration of their traditional local dance. Building upon the success of the Peace Race, Loroupe expanded the aims of her Peace Foundation by beginning construction of the Tegla Loroupe Peace Academy and promoting the importance of sports, education and health issues (including female circumcision and AIDS) in the region.

The number and quality of competitors reached the standard of international races: the 2007 Rome City Marathon champion Elias Kemboi won the men's race in the same year (beating Wilson Kiprop), while Lineth Chepkurui was the women's winner. The event also gained support from high-level political figures; Deputy Prime Minister Musalia Mudavadi flagged off the 2008 race, which was also attended by the United States Ambassador Michael Ranneberger. That year, one of the region's well-known cattle rustlers used the event to ceremonially surrender an illegal rifle to Kenyan officials. Safaricom sponsored the event in 2009 for a figure of KSh.2.1 million/=.

== Past elite winners ==
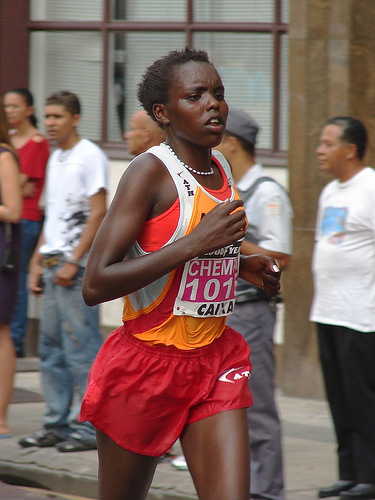
The 2009 women's winner Chemutai Rionotukei

Edition	Year	Men's winner	Time (m:s)	Women's winner	Time (m:s)
1st	2003	David Plimo (KEN)	?	?	?
2nd	2004	David Plimo (KEN)	31:28	Elizabeth Rumokal (KEN)	35:40
3rd	2005	Elias Kemboi (KEN)	31:51	Consolata Chemutai (KEN)	36:52
4th	2006	Levi Matebo (KEN)	32:45	Fridah Domongole (KEN)	35:30
5th	2007	Elias Kemboi (KEN)	31:25	Lineth Chepkurui (KEN)	37:27
6th	2008	Vincent Cheruiyot (KEN)	30:27.4	Jackline Chemwok (KEN)	35:42.6
7th	2009	Kenneth Kimtai (KEN)	32:05	Chemutai Rionotukei (KEN)	34:52
10th	2010	Levi Matebo (KEN)	27:55	Pamela Lisoreng (KEN)	32:51
11th	2011	Paul Lonyangata (KEN)	27:14	Pamela Lisoreng (KEN)	32:10
12th	2012	John Keter (KEN)	n/a	Catherine Moses (KEN)	n/a
13th	2013	(25x17px)		(25x17px)	
14th	2014	(25x17px)		(25x17px)	
