= Yeshi Esayias =

Ethiopian long-distance runner

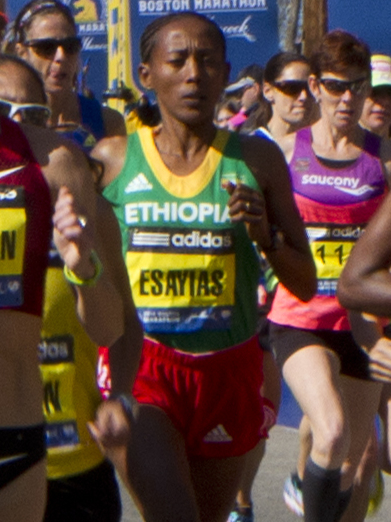
Competing in the 2014 Boston Marathon

Yeshi Esayias Tessema (born 28 December 1985) is an Ethiopian long-distance runner who competes in marathon races. Her personal best for the distance is 2:24:06 hours. She has won races in Ottawa and Montreal and is a two-time winner of the Taipei International Marathon and Daegu Marathon. She has also finished second at the Tokyo Marathon (twice) and the Beijing Marathon.

Yeshi made her debut over 42.195 km at the 2007 Marrakech Marathon, where her run of 2:40:10 hours brought her second place. She ran two further marathons that year, improving to 2:36:58 for third at the Ottawa Marathon, then performing less well at the Istanbul Marathon (16th in 2:44:14). Returning to the site of her debut, she won the 2008 Marrakech race in a personal best of 2:35:40 hours. She went faster again in Ottawa, timing 2:35:28, but this was only enough for fifth on that occasion. Podium finishes followed with a win at the Marathon Oasis de Montreal and third at the Casablanca Marathon.

The 2009 season saw Yeshi dip under two and a half hours as she defended her Marrakech title in 2:29:52 hours. She posted similar marks to win that year's Daegu Marathon and Taipei Marathon, as well as taking runner-up in Casablanca. Heading back to East Asia in 2010, she repeated her victories in Daegu and Taipei. Her Daegu win was a course record and personal best time of 2:29:17 hours. She was also fourth at the Taiyuan International Marathon. Yeshi improved her times again in 2011: she was faster than her course record in Daegu, running 2:26:04, but ended up second behind Atsede Habtamu. She was runner-up again later that year, finishing behind Wei Xiaojie at the Beijing Marathon, although she did finish ahead of Catherine Ndereba.

Yeshi had a personal best for a sixth consecutive year in 2012, with her best run being 2:26:00 for second at the Tokyo Marathon. After a three-year absence she ran at the Ottawa Marathon and this time she won the race. She was part of an Ethiopian podium sweep at the Guangzhou Marathon in November, coming second to Mulu Seboka. Yeshi had a near exact repeat performance at the 2013 Tokyo Marathon, finishing one second slower than in 2012, but still in second place. She set a new personal best to win at the Ottawa Marathon in May, finishing in a course record time of 2:25:31 hours. She improved further to 2:24:06 hours at the Frankfurt Marathon, taking sixth place.
