= 2021 Taipei Marathon =

Annual marathon race in Taipei, Taiwan

25th Taipei Marathon
- Main visual of the race
- Venue: Taipei, Taiwan
- Date: December 19, 2021
- Competitors: 28,000 runners

Champions
- Men: Demeke Kasaw Biksegn (ETH) (2:11:42)
- Women: Alemtsehay Asifa Kasegn (ETH) (2:30:44)

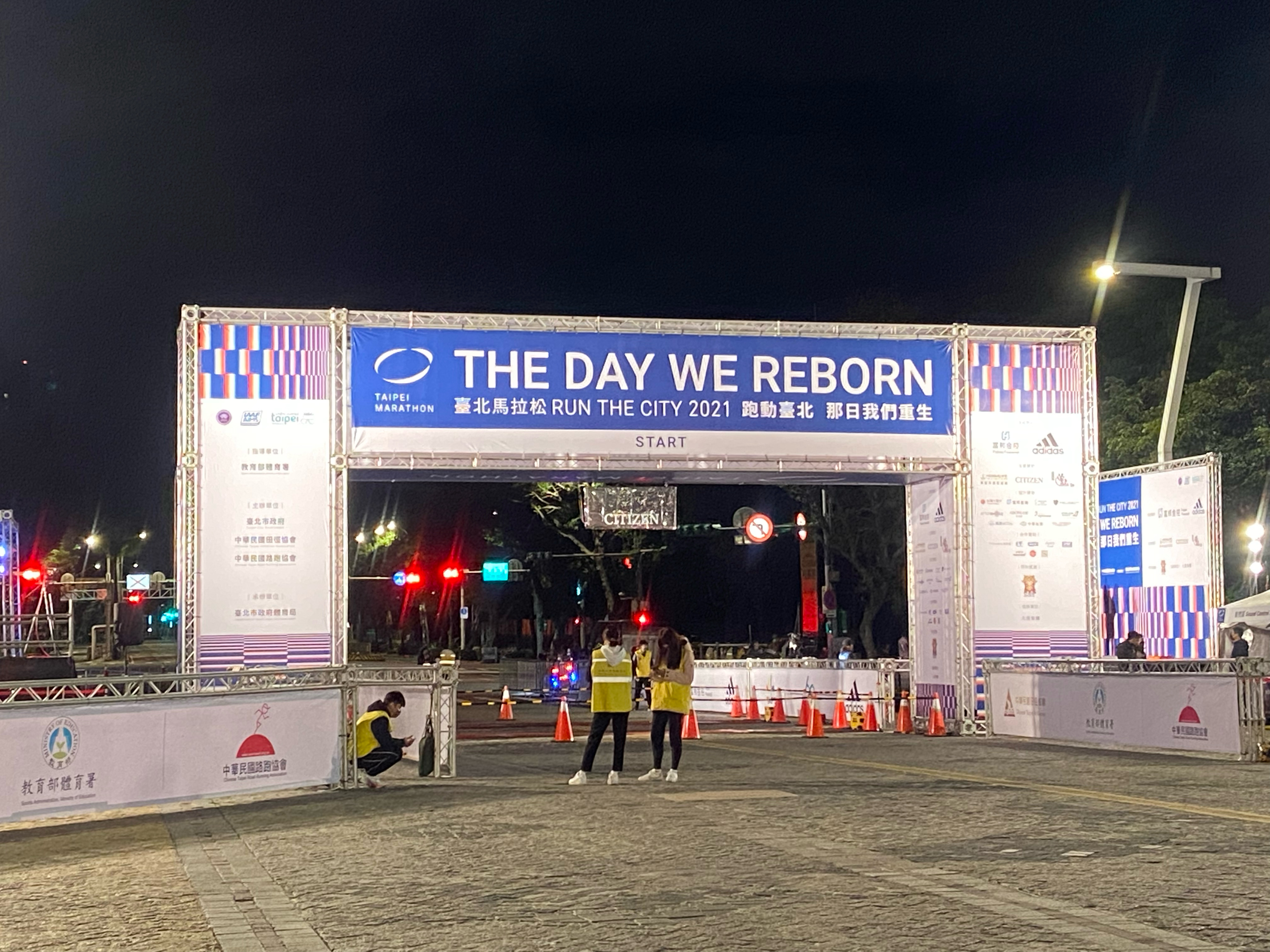
The starting point at the Taipei City Hall Square

The 2021 Taipei Marathon was an Elite Label marathon race held in Taipei, Taiwan on December 19, 2021. It was the 25th running of the race.

A Taipei Marathon organize committee made renewal of the race's identify system and route in this edition of the race, the new logo was inspired from the Möbius strip.

== Background ==
The slogan of the race is "Run the city, the day we reborn". It symbolizes Taiwan, which has surpassed the most dangerous stage of the local epidemic caused by COVID-19.

Due to the pandemic, this edition of Taipei Marathon no need to randomly draw for participant qualification. The field is limited to 28,000 runners. (Marathon for 9,000 and half marathon in 18,000)

Runners were required to show them's COVID-19 vaccination or negative COVID-19 test before entering the starting point.

=== For higher certification ===
Taipei Marathon has been certified as Bronze Label road race by World Athletics in 2019 (Adjustment to the Elite Label classification due to the COVID-19 pandemic). But since then has been no further news about upgrade its certification.

Ko Wen-je, mayor of the city of Taipei says the goal is to successfully apply an Elite Platinum label in 2022.

=== Elite runners ===
Marathon
Men's elite	Nationality	Personal Best
Oleksandr Sitkovskyi	Ukraine	2:09:11
Nicodemus Kipkurui Kimutai	Kenya	2:10:00
Bilal Marhoum	Morocco	2:11:20
Vitalis Kwemoi	Uganda	2:11:25
Demeke Kasaw Biksegn	Ethiopia	2:12:12
Aragaw Yitbarek Meseret	Ethiopia	2:14:39
Ho Chin-ping	Taiwan	2:17:42
Chiang Chieh-wen	Taiwan	2:18:17
Chou Ting-yin	Taiwan	2:23:21
Li Ming-sheng	Taiwan	2:30:56
Chen Yu-jen	Taiwan	2:32:01
Wen Lien-chung	Taiwan	2:32:26
Lai Yi-ting	Taiwan	2:35:32
Women's elite	Nationality	Personal Best
Alemtsehay Asifa Kasegn	Ethiopia	2:32:00
Gelane Bulbula Senbete	Ethiopia	2:32:22
Lilia Fisikovici	Moldova	2:27:29
Viktoriia Kaliuzhna	Ukraine	2:27:05
Esther Wanjiru Macharia	Kenya	2:29:17
Caroline Chepkwony	Kenya	2:27:00
Tsao Chun-yu	Taiwan	2:32:41
Hsieh Chien-he	Taiwan	2:40:41
Chang Chih-hsuan	Taiwan	2:46:36
Chu Ying-ying	Taiwan	2:56:49
Li Chia-mei	Taiwan	2:57:52
Yang Chiao-chu	Taiwan	3:02:37

Half Marathon
Men's elite	Nationality	Personal Best
Wu Jui-en	Taiwan	1:07:57
Teng Hsin-chuan	Taiwan	1:07:58
Huang Hsiang-wei	Taiwan	1:08:06
Chou Hung-yu	Taiwan	1:08:41
Tseng Ting-wei	Taiwan	1:09:29
Li Fang-chen	Taiwan	1:09:31
Li Qi-ju	Taiwan	1:10:43
Hung Lin-hung	Taiwan	1:10:47
Tsai Cheng-hsuan	Taiwan	1:12:33
Chang Zhe-hao	Taiwan	1:12:50
Women's elite	Nationality	Personal Best
Fu Shu-ping	Taiwan	1:15:41
Chen Yu-hsuan	Taiwan	1:18:26
Chang Yu-chen	Taiwan	1:18:53
Su Feng-ting	Taiwan	1:19:12
Chang Chao-chun	Taiwan	1:22:05

== Results ==
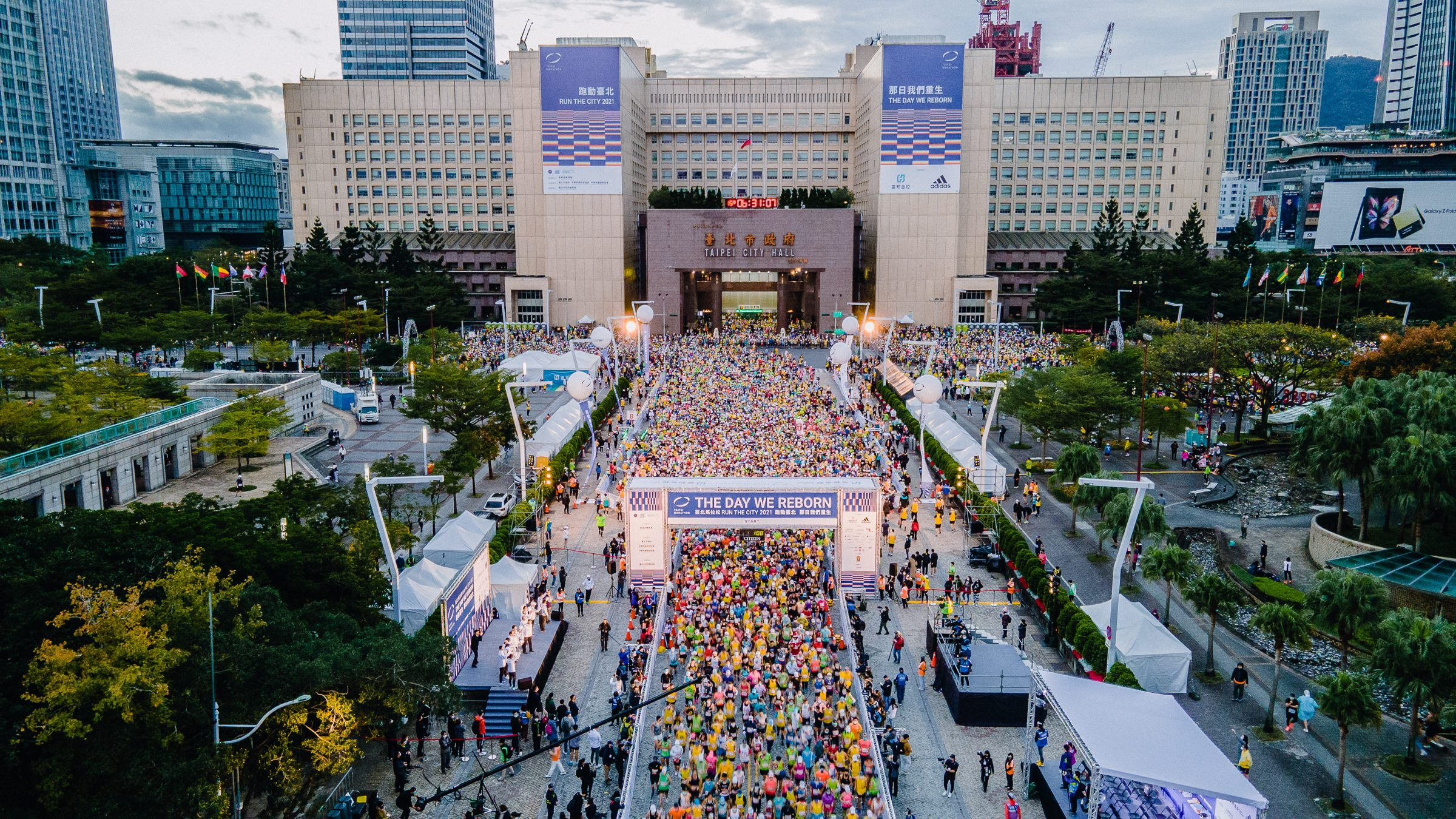
Start time

External videos
- "Live broadcast".
- "Marathon route guide".
- "Half Marathon route guide".
- "Highlight".

=== Marathon ===
The elite men's and women's races were won by Ethiopians Demeke Kasaw Biksegn and Alemtsehay Asifa Kasegn, respectively. Taiwanese runner Chou Ting-yin won the domestic champion for two consecutive years, and Tsao Chun-yu was meeting the entry standards for 2022 Asian Games.

Elite men's top 10 finishers
Place	Athlete	Nationality	Time
1st place, gold medalist(s)	Demeke Kasaw Biksegn	Ethiopia	2:11:42 PB
2nd place, silver medalist(s)	Aragaw Yitbarek Meseret	Ethiopia	2:14:59
3rd place, bronze medalist(s)	Bilal Marhoum	Morocco	2:15:14
4	Vitalis Kwemoi	Uganda	2:17:01
5	Nicodemus Kipkurui Kimutai	Kenya	2:21:09
6	Chou Ting-yin	Taiwan	2:23:13 PB
7	Chiang Chieh-wen	Taiwan	2:23:51
8	Huang Wei-hen	Taiwan	2:28:46
9	Tan Huong-leong	Malaysia	2:28:52
10	Ho Chin-ping	Taiwan	2:29:41

Elite women's top 10 finishers
Place	Athlete	Nationality	Time
1st place, gold medalist(s)	Alemtsehay Asifa Kasegn	Ethiopia	2:30:44
2nd place, silver medalist(s)	Esther Wanjiru Macharia	Kenya	2:31:54
3rd place, bronze medalist(s)	Lilia Fisikovici	Moldova	2:32:48
4	Tsao Chun-yu	Taiwan	2:33:51
5	Viktoriia Kaliuzhna	Ukraine	2:34:58
6	Caroline Chepkwony	Kenya	2:36:11
7	Gelane Bulbula Senbete	Ethiopia	2:38:55
8	Chang Chih-hsuan	Taiwan	2:46:37
9	Li Chia-mei	Taiwan	2:52:31
10	Chen Yi-ning	Taiwan	2:53:18

=== Half marathon ===
The top four racers from Taiwan met the entry requirements for the 2021 Summer World University Games.

Elite men's top 10 finishers
Place	Athlete	Nationality	Time
1st place, gold medalist(s)	Li Lee-chun	Taiwan	1:07:33
2nd place, silver medalist(s)	Huang Hsiang-wei	Taiwan	1:07:38
3rd place, bronze medalist(s)	Chou Hsien-feng	Taiwan	1:07:48
4	Wu Jui-en	Taiwan	1:07:48
5	Chiang Yen-lun	Taiwan	1:08:06
6	Shih Yu-tso	Taiwan	1:08:33
7	Chiang Ying-wei	Taiwan	1:08:54
8	Tseng Ting-wei	Taiwan	1:09:25
9	Chou Hung-yu	Taiwan	1:09:59
10	Teng Hsin-chuan	Taiwan	1:10:19

Elite women's top 10 finishers
Place	Athlete	Nationality	Time
1st place, gold medalist(s)	Su Feng-ting	Taiwan	1:17:06 PB
2nd place, silver medalist(s)	Lai Ting-hsuan	Taiwan	1:17:58
3rd place, bronze medalist(s)	You Ya-jyun	Taiwan	1:18:15
4	Li Hsin-rong	Taiwan	1:22:07
5	Lo Pei-chi	Taiwan	1:22:42
6	Wu Ming	Taiwan	1:23:47
7	Cheng Chun-chih	Taiwan	1:24:09
8	Chiu Yu-cheng	Taiwan	1:25:25
9	Chen Yen-ling	Taiwan	1:25:39
10	Chen Ya-wen	Taiwan	1:26:44
