= Ottawa Race Weekend =

Weekend of road running events

- Date: 4th weekend of May
- Location: Ottawa, Ontario and Gatineau, Quebec
- Event type: Road
- Distance: Marathon, Half marathon, 10K run, 5K run, 2K, 1.2K Kids Marathon
- Primary sponsor: Tamarack
- Established: 1975 (51 years ago)
- Course records: Marathon: Men: Andualem Shiferaw (ETH) 2:06:04; Women: Gelete Burka (ETH) 2:22:17; 10K: Men: Deriba Merga (ETH) 27:24; Women: Gladys Cherono (KEN) 30:56
- Website: Ottawa Race Weekend
- Participants: 2,776 marathon finishers (2019); 9,755 (2019)

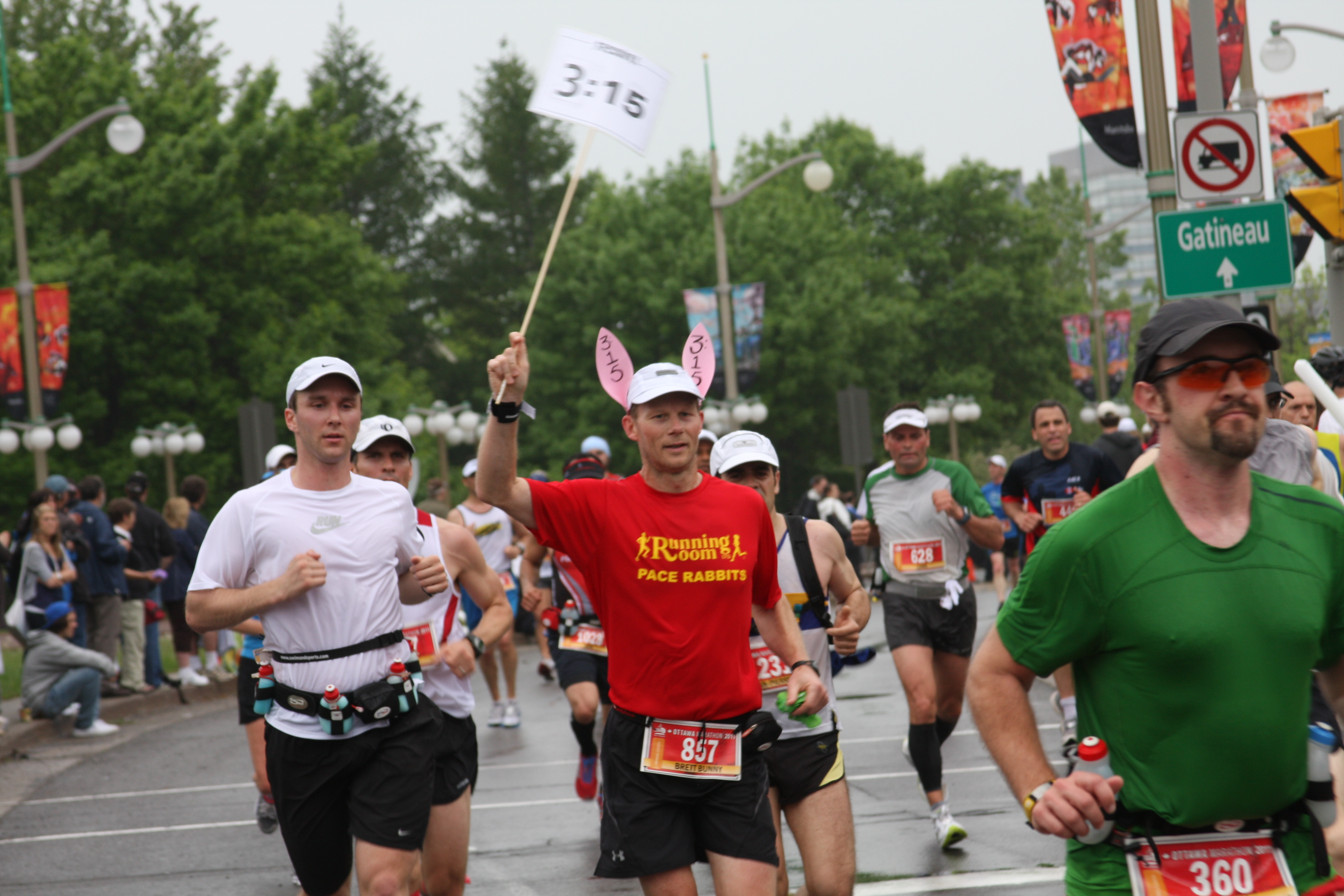
3:15 marathon pace rabbit in 2011

The Ottawa Race Weekend (also known as Tamarack Ottawa Race Weekend for sponsorship reasons) is an annual weekend of road running events held the last weekend of May in the city of Ottawa, Ontario, Canada. The two-day running event includes seven races, including the Ottawa Marathon, all of which start and end at Ottawa City Hall. The marathon was first held in 1975, and is categorized as an Elite Label Road Race by World Athletics. Over 40,000 participants take part in the races each year.

The Ottawa Race Weekend also includes Canada's largest health and fitness expo, which opens on the Thursday before the weekend. In addition, each year, participants in the Ottawa Race Weekend raise close to $1 million for approximately 25 local and national charities affiliated with the event.

The 2020 and 2021 editions of the race were cancelled due to the COVID-19 coronavirus pandemic.

== Races ==
The race weekend includes seven races: a 1.2 km kids marathon, 2K, 5K, 10K, half marathon, wheelchair marathon, and marathon. All of the races start and finish at Ottawa City Hall.

The signature event of the weekend is the Ottawa Marathon, which was first held in 1975. Today it is the largest marathon event in Canada and is a qualifier for the Boston Marathon. The event is also home to the Canadian Marathon Championships and the Canadian Forces Marathon Championships.

The Ottawa Race Weekend was at one point the only road racing event in the world to host two IAAF Silver Label events: the 10K and the Ottawa Marathon. In 2014 the 10k became the first IAAF Gold Label road race in Canada. On October 22, 2015, the Marathon also became an IAAF Gold Label road race. In 2023, the race was reclassified by World Athletics as an Elite road race (one level below Gold).

== History ==
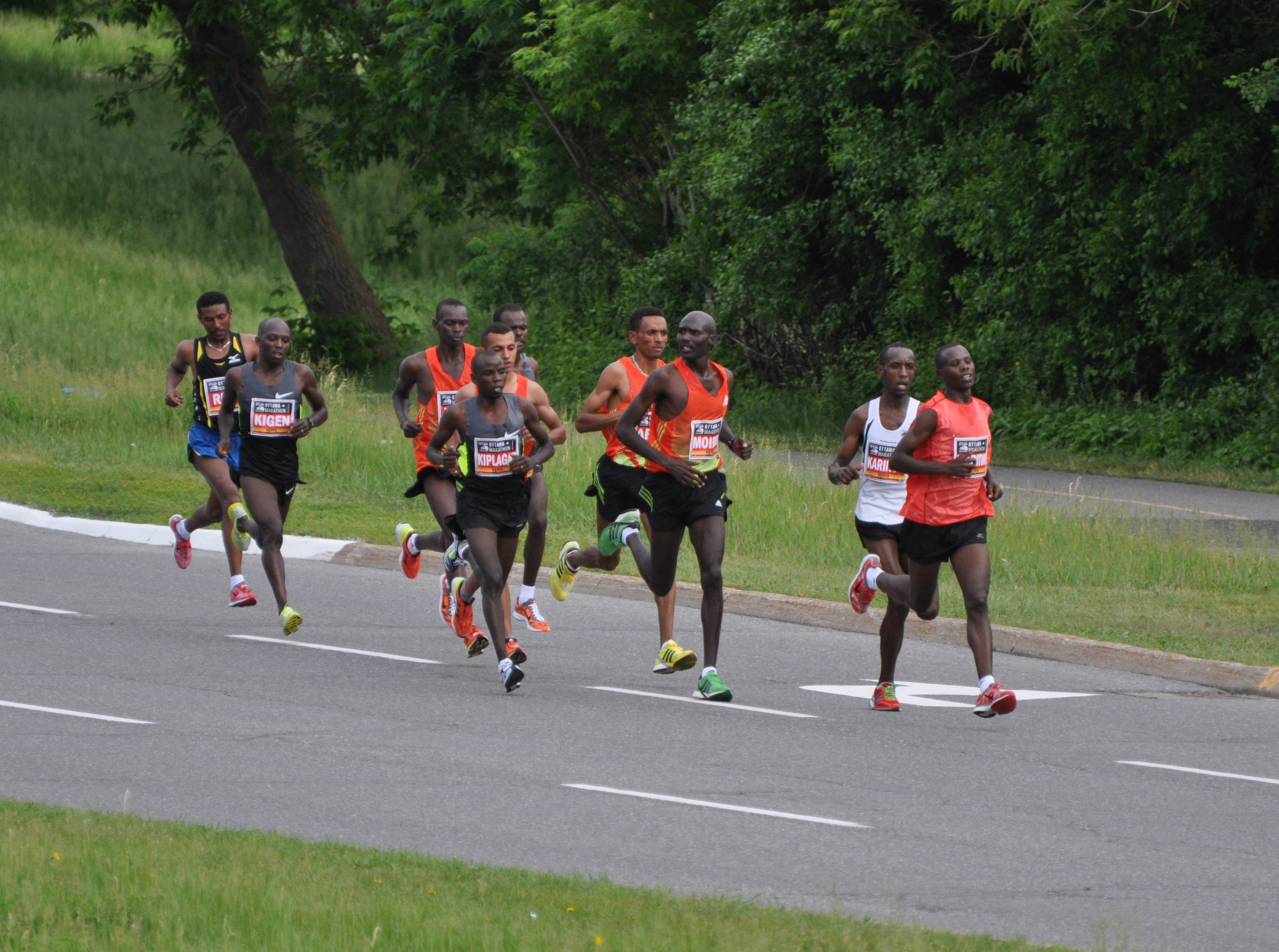
2011 and 2012 winner, Laban Moiben, leading the race through the 18 km mark during the 2012 event

- 1975: 146 runners, 143 men and 3 women, participate in the inaugural Ottawa Marathon.
- 1986: 10K distance is added.
- 1995: Inline skating is permitted on the marathon course.
- 1996: Jim Robinson joins as the Race Director.
- 1998: 5K distance and half-marathon are added. Ottawa becomes the first running event in Canada to be chip-timed.
- 1999: 2K distance is added.
- 2005: Inline skating is no longer permitted.
- 2006: Fourteen runners accidentally cut 400 m (1,300 ft) off the course because a motorist moved a barricade after a group of high school student volunteers had left their post to talk to some friends. Amos Tirop Matui of Kenya crossed the finish line first, but the fourteen affected runners were marked as "non-ratified results". Some runners were given places, including Matui, who was placed third, and some runners were financially compensated.
- 2010: Rick Ball breaks world record for a single-leg amputee in a marathon.
- 2012: Jim Robinson retires and two-time Olympian, and previous Ottawa 10K course record holder John Halvorsen is named Race Director. The event took on the name "Tamarack Ottawa Race Weekend" when Ottawa-based Tamarack Homes joined as title sponsor.
- 2013: Close to 44,000 people participate in the Tamarack Ottawa Race Weekend, making it the largest multi-race road racing event in Canada.
- 2014: Ottawa Marathon celebrates 40 years; 48,000 people expected to participate in the weekend’s seven events.
- 2016: A heat wave caused temperatures during Ottawa Race Weekend to exceed 30 degrees at times. The start times of some events were modified.
- 2019: A closure of Elgin Street for construction and a closure of the Chaudière Crossing due to flooding forced Ottawa Race Weekend to modify its route.
- 2019: Ian Fraser is appointed race director.
- 2020 and 2021: The Ottawa Race Weekend was cancelled due to the COVID-19 coronavirus pandemic, which had postponed or cancelled nearly all large races, closed most places of commerce and worship, and shut down most gatherings of 10 or more people. Organizers declined to refund participants. Although many people who had paid for the races questioned the choice, organizers said they had already spent a large percentage of revenues prior to Race Weekend.

== Management ==
The event is organized by Run Ottawa, a not-for-profit organization. More than 2,000 volunteers, including a volunteer race committee, support a team of nine full-time staff in organizing the event.

== Winners ==
Key:

Course record (in bold)
Canadian championship race

=== Marathon ===
Ed.	Year	Men's winner	Time	Women's winner	Time
50th	2026	(Kenya) Elvis Cheboi	2:09:22	(Sweden) Abeba Aregawi	2:23:12
49th	2025	(Kenya) Albert Korir	2:08:22	(Kenya) Mercy Chelangat	2:23:33
48th	2024	(Ethiopia) Tesfaye Anbesa	2:12:41	(Ethiopia) Maeregu Hayelom	2:32:20
47th	2023	(Ethiopia) Yihunilign Adane	2:08:22	(Ethiopia) Waganesh Mekasha	2:24:47
46th	2022	(Ethiopia) Andualem Shiferaw	**2:06:04**	(Canada) Kinsey Middleton	2:30:09
	2021	Event canceled due to COVID-19 coronavirus pandemic			
	2020	Event canceled due to COVID-19 coronavirus pandemic			
45th	2019	(Kenya) Albert Korir	2:08:03	(Ethiopia) Tigist Girma	2:26:34
44th	2018	(Ethiopia) Yemane Tsegay	2:08:52	(Ethiopia) Gelete Burka	**2:22:17**
43rd	2017	(Kenya) Eliud Kiptanui	2:10:14	(Ethiopia) Guteni Imana	2:30:18
42nd	2016	(Ethiopia) Dino Sefir	2:08:14	(Ethiopia) Koren Jelela	2:27:06
41st	2015	(Ethiopia) Girmay Birhanu	2:08:14	(Ethiopia) Aberu Mekuria	2:25:30
40th	2014	(Ethiopia) Yemane Tsegay	2:06:54	(Ethiopia) Tigist Tufa	2:24:30
39th	2013	(Ethiopia) Tariku Jufar	2:08:04.8	(Ethiopia) Yeshi Esayias	2:25:30.1
38th	2012	(Kenya) Laban Moiben	2:09:12.9	(Ethiopia) Yeshi Esayias	2:28:46
37th	2011	(Kenya) Laban Moiben	2:10:17.9	(Ethiopia) Kebebush Haile	2:32:14.0
36th	2010	(Japan) Arata Fujiwara	2:09:33.4	(Ethiopia) Merima Mohammed	2:28:19
35th	2009	(Kenya) David Cheruiyot	2:13:22.6	(Morocco) Asmae Leghzaoui	2:27:40.9
34th	2008	(Kenya) David Cheruiyot	2:10:59.8	(Morocco) Asmae Leghzaoui	2:28:43.9
33rd	2007	(Kenya) David Cheruiyot	2:10:35.4	(Canada) Lyudmila Korchagina	2:31:56.6
32nd	2006 ^{†}	(Morocco) Abderrahime Bouramdane	2:12:18.2	(Canada) Lyudmila Korchagina	2:29:42.1
31st	2005	(Kenya) David Cheruiyot	2:14:20.3	(Russia) Lidiya Vasilevskaya	2:31:52.7
30th	2004	(Kenya) Elly Rono	2:11:47.4	(Russia) Lyudmila Korchagina	2:30:53.0
29th	2003	(Kenya) Joseph Nderitu	2:15:29.2	(Canada) Sandy Jacobson	2:33:51.9
28th	2002	(Kenya) Joseph Nderitu	2:14:04.0	(Russia) Lyudmila Korchagina	2:33:13.3
27th	2001	(Kenya) Joseph Nderitu	2:15:50.5	(Canada) Danuta Bartoszek	2:37:58.9
26th	2000	(Canada) Bruce Deacon	2:17:12.5	(Canada) Veronique Vandersmissen	2:36:45.1
25th	1999	(Canada) Bruce Raymer	2:22:24.7	(Canada) Veronique Vandersmissen	2:39:56.4
24th	1998	(United Kingdom) Malcolm Campbell	2:31:16	(Canada) Leslie Carson	2:49:06
23rd	1997	(Canada) Nick Tsioros	2:25:16	(Canada) Laura Ruptash	3:01:46
22nd	1996	(Canada) Jean Lagarde	2:26:02	(Canada) Kimberley Webb	2:52:03
21st	1995	(Canada) Jean Lagarde	2:26:53	(Canada) Noeleen Wadden	2:58:51
20th	1994	(Canada) Jean Lagarde	2:19:00	(Canada) France Levasseur	2:50:52
19th	1993	(Canada) Jean Lagarde	2:23:14	(Canada) Noeleen Wadden	2:52:31
18th	1992	(Canada) Michael Petrocci	2:20:03	(United States) Betsy Kneale	2:47:55
17th	1991	(Canada) Michael Petrocci	2:23:44	(Canada) Laura Konantz	2:51:00
16th	1990	(Canada) Gord Christie	2:18:38	(Canada) France Levasseur	2:49:33
15th	1989	(Canada) Gord Christie	2:14:33	(Canada) Lise Bouchard	2:44:58
14th	1988	(Canada) Gord Christie	2:18:40	(Mexico) Margarita Galicia	2:52:08
13th	1987	(Canada) Peter Maher	2:12:58	(Canada) Dorothy Goertzen	2:40:59
12th	1986	(Canada) Bruce Wainman	2:18:24	(Canada) Joan Groothuysen	2:54:25
11th	1985	(United States) Ric Sayre	2:16:18	(United States) Marian Teitsch	2:47:56
10th	1984	(Canada) Dave Edge	2:13:19	(Canada) Silvia Ruegger	2:30:37
9th	1983	(Canada) Mike Dyon	2:21:37	(Canada) Celia McInnis	2:54:13
8th	1982	(United States) Greg Leroy	2:21:04	(United States) Margo Elson	2:50:50
7th	1981	(Canada) Mike Dyon	2:16:07	(Canada) Kathryn Tanner	2:48:54
6th	1980	(Canada) Patrick Montuoro	2:22:54	(Canada) Christine Lavallee	2:42:50
5th	1979	(Canada) Jerome Drayton	2:18:05	(Canada) Jacqueline Gareau	2:47:58
4th	1978	(Canada) Brian Maxwell	2:16:03	(Canada) Christine Lavallee	2:47:37
3rd	1977	(Canada) Mike Dyon	2:18:05	(Canada) Joann McKinty-Heale	3:02:22
2nd	1976	(Canada) Wayne Yetman	2:16:32	(Canada) Eleanor Thomas	3:09:27
1st	1975	(Morocco) Mehdi Jaouhar	2:26:39	(Canada) Eleanor Thomas	3:27:28

- ^{†} Bouramdane was declared the official winner. A number of faster runners, led by Amos Tirop Matui, were disqualified after a route error caused them to cut 400 m off the true marathon distance.

=== 10K race ===
Ed.	Year	Men's winner	Time	Women's winner	Time
39th	2026	Andrew Alexander (CAN)	28:19	Florence Caron (CAN)	32:32
38th	2025	Charles Philibert-Thiboutot (CAN) (NR)	28:06	Gracelyn Larkin (CAN)	32:43
37th	2024	Ben Flanagan (CAN)	28:09	Malindi Elmore (CAN)	32:50
36th	2023	Mohammed Ahmed (CAN)	28:21.1	Natasha Wodak (CAN)	32:51
35th	2022	Ben Flanagan (CAN)	28:39	Natasha Wodak (CAN)	32:41
	2021	Event canceled due to COVID-19 coronavirus pandemic			
	2020	Event canceled due to COVID-19 coronavirus pandemic			
34th	2019	Mohammed Ziani (MAR)	28:12	Dorcas Kimeli (KEN)	31:09
33rd	2018	Andamlak Belihu (ETH)	27:48	Alia Mohammed (UAE)	31:36
32nd	2017	Leule Gebrselassie (ETH)	28:42.1	Netsanet Gudeta (ETH)	31:34.1
31st	2016	Mohammed Ziani (MAR)	28:36.5	Peres Jepchirchir (KEN)	31:29
30th	2015	Nicholas Bor (KEN)	27:55	Gladys Cherono (KEN)	**30:56**
29th	2014	Wilson Kiprop (KEN)	28:00	Mary Keitany (KEN)	31:22
28th	2013	El-Hassan El-Abbassi (MAR)	27:36.6	Malika Assahah (MAR)	31:45.7
27th	2012	Geoffrey Mutai (KEN)	27:41.4	Lindsey Scherf (USA)	33:12.8
26th	2011	Deriba Merga (ETH)	28:30.3	Dire Tune (ETH)	31:43.2
25th	2010	Lelisa Desisa (ETH)	28:08.9	Dire Tune (ETH)	32:11.5
24th	2009	Deriba Merga (ETH)	**27:23.9**	Teyba Erkesso (ETH)	31:50.4
23rd	2008	Julius Kiptoo (KEN)	28:37.0	Emebet Bacha (ETH)	32:42.1
22nd	2007	Simon Bairu (CAN)	28:29.1	Catherine Ndereba (KEN)	33:01.2
21st	2006	George Misoi (KEN)	28:29.5	Tetyana Hladyr (UKR)	32:05.0
20th	2005	George Misoi (KEN)	28:55.7	Grace Momanyi (KEN)	31:24.4
19th	2004	Duncan Kibet (KEN)	28:59.8	Aster Demissie (ETH)	32:30.3
18th	2003	Yevgeniy Bozhko (UKR)	28:23.6	Lyudmila Biktasheva (RUS)	32:16.4
17th	2002	Enos Keter (KEN)	28:29.8	Uta Pippig (GER)	32:57.7
16th	2001	Julius Nderitu (KEN)	28:28.3	Uta Pippig (GER)	32:31.7
15th	2000	Paul Mbugua (KEN)	29:32.1	Grace Momanyi (KEN)	33:36.2
14th	1999	Paul Mbugua (KEN)	29:54	Danuta Bartoszek (CAN)	34:16.4
13th	1998	Paul Mbugua (KEN)	29:06	Isabelle LeDroit (CAN)	34:28
12th	1997	Rachid Tbahi (MAR)	29:41	Sarah Dillabough (CAN)	33:26
11th	1996	Steve Boyd (CAN)	29:55	Tania Jones (CAN)	34:54
10th	1995	John Halvorsen (NOR)	29:25	Tania Jones (CAN)	35:29
9th	1994	Jeff Lockyer (CAN)	29:52	Lisa Presedo (CAN)	34:32
8th	1993	Steve Boyd (CAN)	30:03	Lisa Presedo (CAN)	34:16
7th	1992	John Halvorsen (NOR)	28:56	Carole Rouillard (CAN)	33:20
6th	1991	John Halvorsen (NOR)	29:21	Odette Lapierre (CAN)	35:03
5th	1990	Paul McCloy (CAN)	29:22	Odette Lapierre (CAN)	34:28
4th	1989	Alberto Maravilha (POR)	29:08	Albertina Dias (POR)	32:11
3rd	1988	John Halvorsen (NOR)	28:12	Sheryl Reid (CAN)	34:24
2nd	1987	Paul Williams (CAN)	30:18	?	?
1st	1986	Robert Rice (CAN)	29:30	Maureen de St. Croix (CAN)	35:37

== See also ==
- List of marathon races in North America
