= 2020 Taipei Marathon =

Annual marathon race in Taipei, Taiwan

24th Taipei Marathon
- Main visual of the race
- Venue: Taipei, Taiwan
- Date: December 20, 2020
- Competitors: 28,000 runners

Champions
- Men: Paul Lonyangata (KEN) (2:09:18)
- Women: Askale Merachi Wegi (ETH) (2:28:31)

The 2020 Taipei Marathon, the 24th running of that city's premier long-distance race, was held on December 20, 2020. Around 28,000 people ran in the event, of whom 22,189 finished.

Kenyan long-distance runner Paul Lonyangata smashed the previous record by 2:09:18. Taiwanese runner Chou Ting-yin claimed the domestic title, and Tsao Chun-yu established the new women's national record.

== Background ==
The slogan of the race was "Dare To Breathe". It symbolizes under the COVID-19 pandemic, most road running races have been cancelled or postponed worldwide, although participants must wear a face mask and maintain a safety distance before the start, the Taipei Marathon took place as usual.

=== WA Label Road Races ===
The 2020 Taipei Marathon has been recognized by the World Athletics as Bronze Label races.

== Results ==
External videos
- "Live broadcast".
- "Marathon route guide".
- "Half Marathon route guide".
- "Highlight".

=== Marathon ===
Elite men's top 10 finishers
Place	Athlete	Nationality	Time
1st place, gold medalist(s)	Paul Lonyangata	Kenya	2:09:18 MR
2nd place, silver medalist(s)	Elisha Rotich	Kenya	2:13:07
3rd place, bronze medalist(s)	Tiidrek Nurme	Estonia	2:16:11
4	Bilal Marhoum	Morocco	2:16:22
5	Oleksandr Sitkovskyi	Ukraine	2:20:40
6	Tan Huong-leong	Malaysia	2:23:13
7	Chou Ting-yin	Taiwan	2:23:21 PB
8	Chu Meng-tsung	Taiwan	2:27:58
9	Tsai Cheng-hsuan	Taiwan	2:30:07
10	Lin Chiu-chieh	Taiwan	2:30:53

Elite women's top 10 finishers
Place	Athlete	Nationality	Time
1st place, gold medalist(s)	Askale Merachi Wegi	Ethiopia	2:28:31
2nd place, silver medalist(s)	Alemtsehay Asifa Kasegn	Ethiopia	2:32:00
3rd place, bronze medalist(s)	Zinash Mekonen Lema	Ethiopia	2:32:24
4	Tsao Chun-yu	Taiwan	2:32:41 NR
5	Gladys Tejeda	Peru	2:37:23
6	Hiroko Baino	Japan	2:45:53
7	Chang Chih-hsuan	Taiwan	2:49:19
8	Zhu Ying-ying	Taiwan	2:56:49
9	Chen Yi-ning	Taiwan	2:58:18
10	Hsu Chao-cheng	Taiwan	3:00:08

=== Half marathon ===
Elite men's top 10 finishers
Place	Athlete	Nationality	Time
1st place, gold medalist(s)	Wu Jui-en	Taiwan	1:07:57
2nd place, silver medalist(s)	Huang Hsiang-wei	Taiwan	1:08:06
3rd place, bronze medalist(s)	Chou Hung-yu	Taiwan	1:08:41
4	Ho Hsing-hang	Taiwan	1:10:24
5	Chiang Yen-lun	Taiwan	1:10:37
6	Chiang Ying-wei	Taiwan	1:11:55
7	Liao Hsuan-hao	Taiwan	1:12:04
8	Chao Yu-jui	Taiwan	1:14:29
9	Li Fang-chen	Taiwan	1:14:29
10	Lin Sheng-che	Taiwan	1:15:14

Elite women's top 10 finishers
Place	Athlete	Nationality	Time
1st place, gold medalist(s)	Hsieh Chien-ho	Taiwan	1:15:17
2nd place, silver medalist(s)	Fu Shu-ping	Taiwan	1:16:36
3rd place, bronze medalist(s)	Chang Yu-chen	Taiwan	1:18:53
4	Su Feng-ting	Taiwan	1:19:12
5	Li Chia-mei	Taiwan	1:22:18
6	Kuo Pei-ling	Taiwan	1:22:54
7	Tsai Yun-hsuan	Taiwan	1:24:32
8	Chen Chao-chun	Taiwan	1:24:40
9	Lo Pei-chi	Taiwan	1:24:59
10	Yen Hsiao-ching	Taiwan	1:25:01
