= Taipei Marathon =

Annual race in Taiwan held since 1986

- The Taipei Marathon logo
- Date: Usually the third weekend of December
- Location: Taipei, Taiwan
- Event type: Road running
- Distance: Marathon, Half marathon
- Primary sponsor: Fubon Financial, Adidas
- Established: 1986 (40 years ago)
- Course records: Men: 2:09:18 (set in 2020); Paul Lonyangata (KEN); Women: 2:25:55 (set in 2022); Alemtsehay Asifa Kasegn (ETH)
- Website: www.taipeicitymarathon.com
- Participants: 28,000 (9,000 for marathon, 19,000 for half marathon)

The Taipei Marathon (Chinese: 臺北馬拉松) is an annual marathon held in Taipei, Taiwan, on the third weekend in December. The event has a Gold Label from World Athletics and has been held annually since 1986. It is the preeminent long-distance annual running event in Taiwan.

It ranks among Taiwan's top four marathon events, alongside the New Taipei City Wan Jin Shi Marathon, the Taiwan's Rice Heaven Tianzhong Marathon, and the Kaohsiung Fubon Marathon.

== History ==
On December 22, 1985, the Chinese Taipei Athletics Association organized a road running demonstration event that served as a warm-up for the first Taipei International Marathon.

The first Taipei International Marathon begins on March 9, 1986, with over 2,000 participants, including elite athletes from seven nations, running through the streets of Taipei. All of the starting and finishing points are on Ketagalan Boulevard.

The Taipei International Marathon ran until 1989, when it was forced to halt due to the construction of the Taipei Metro. It has spawned a new marathon race, held on National Freeway 3, which is currently closed to traffic. After the Taipei International Marathon resumed, the event was renamed "Taipei Freeway Marathon" and relocated to National Freeway 1.

In 2001, the Taipei International Marathon was revived, being held on November 14. The start and finish line were relocated to Taipei City Hall Square. In 2003, Internationale Nederlanden Groep, N. V., through its Taiwanese subsidiary ING Aetna Insurance, was named title sponsor, with the race named the ING Taipei International Marathon. On October 20, 2008, during the global financial crisis during the year, as part of the Dutch government funding ING, they sold ING Aetnay to Fubon Financial Holding Co., which also included the Taipei International Marathon sponsorship. The current start line is at Taipei City Hall Square, with the finish line at Taipei Municipal Stadium. The half marathon course skips a loop at the 3.5 mile point at Patriot Road (Aiguo) where it goes to China Road (Zhonggua) and instead from Patriot Road goes to Chungching Road.

The 2024 Marathon featured 12,614 participants and over 23,000 in the half marathon. The running route has also changed significantly, with the addition of a section of riverside park from Nangang to Songshan in 2011.

== Race ==
=== Course ===
External images
- Course map of full marathon in 2020
- Course map of half marathon in 2020

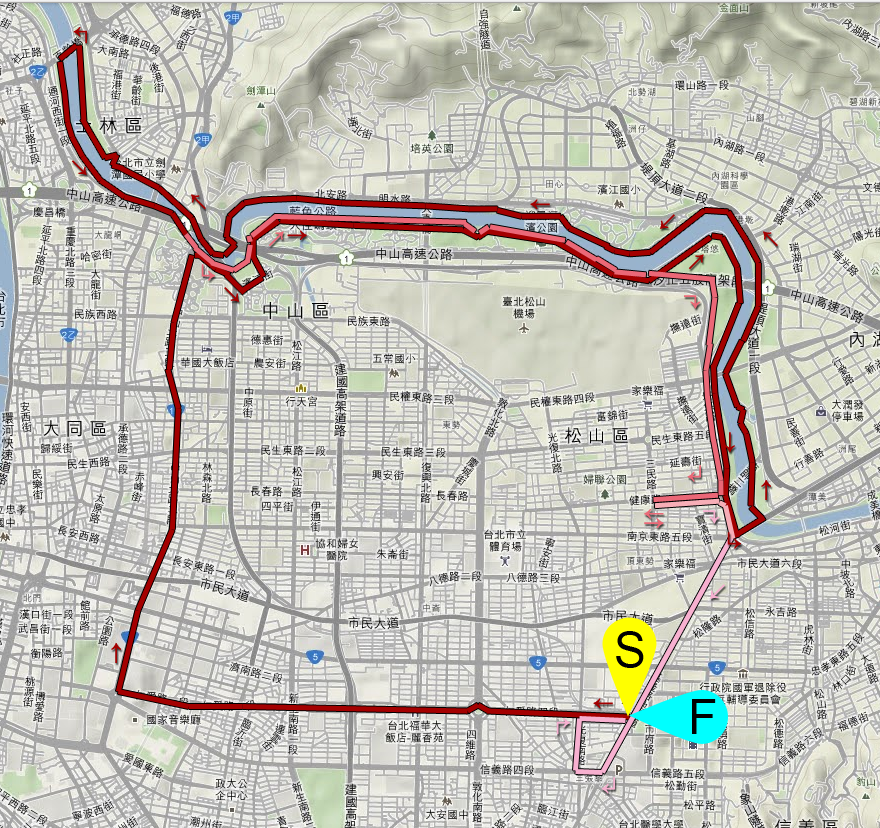
Former course of marathon, 2012

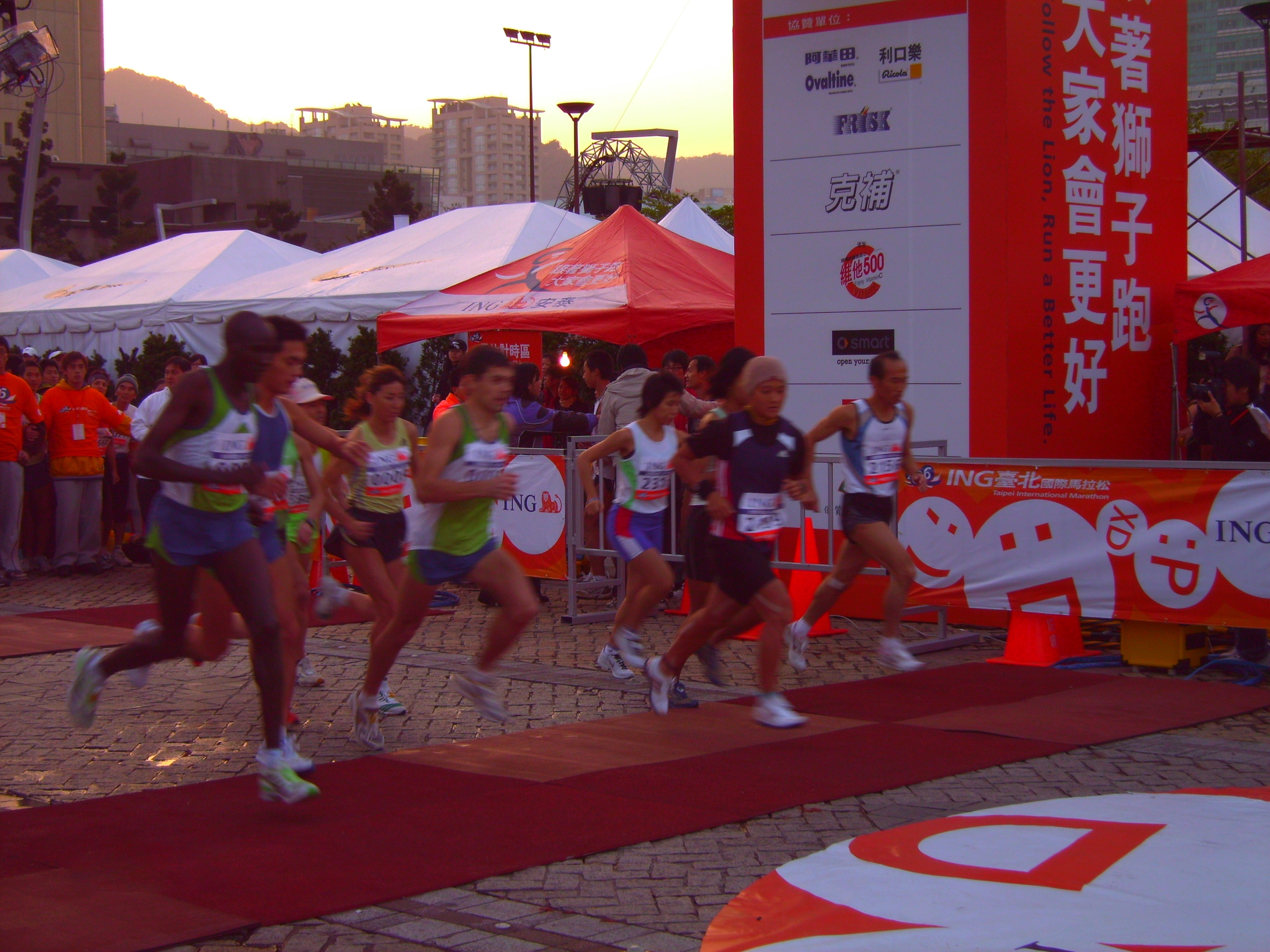
Elite start in 2006

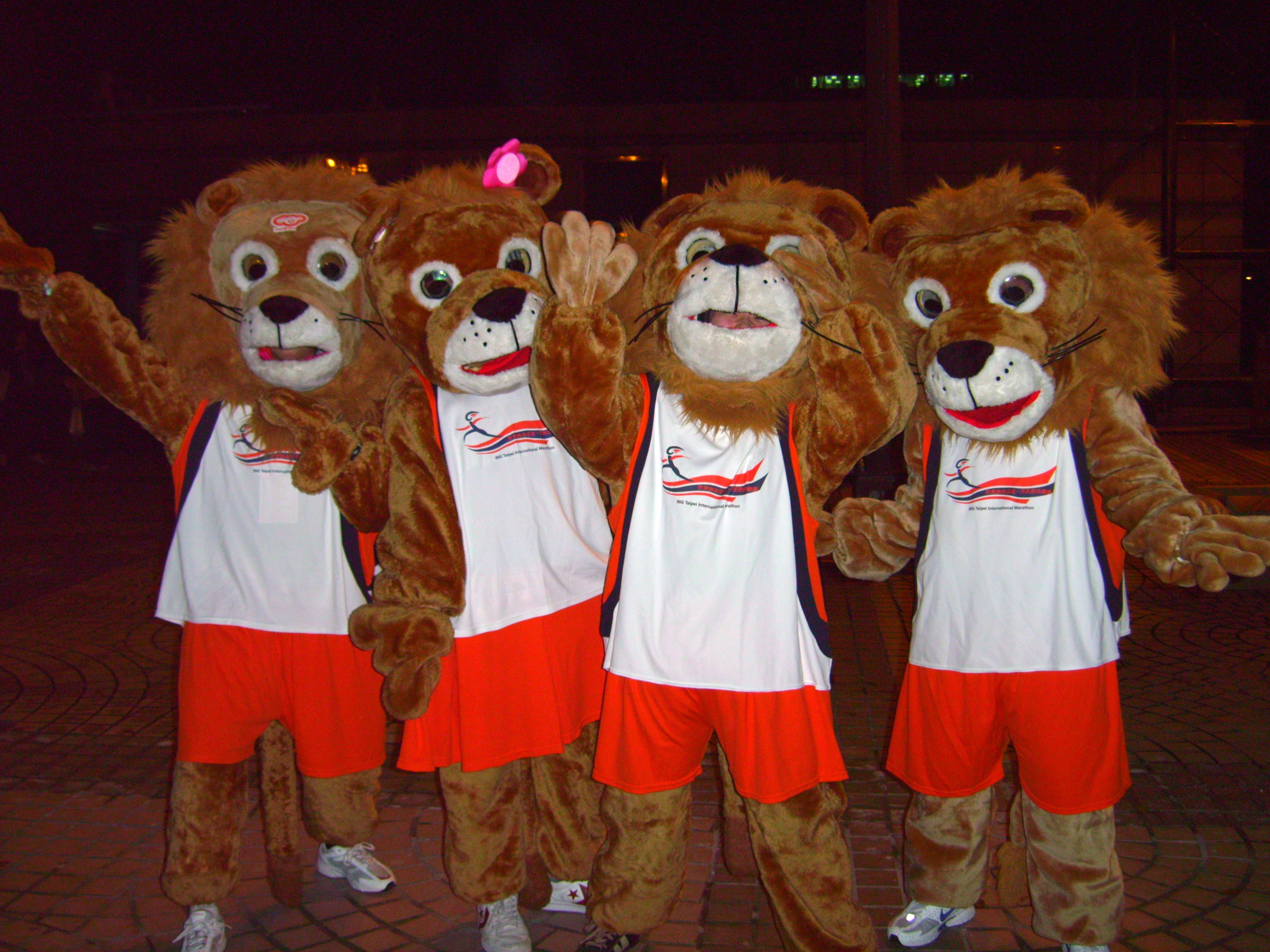
Lions, mascot of sponsor ING, 2006

The marathon starts in front of Taipei City Hall and ends inside Taipei Stadium.

The course first heads west along Renai Road into the Zhongzheng District and wanders around the area for about 5 km (3 mi). Runners then head north along Zhongshan Road, and cross the Keelung River. The marathon then roughly follows the river east until making a turnaround near the Nangang Exhibition Center, and then roughly follows the south side of the river back west to Yingfeng Dog Park. Afterward, the course heads south and then west, eventually joining up with Nanjing Road before finishing inside Taipei Stadium.

The half marathon also starts in front of City Hall, but ends on Nanjing Road before reaching the stadium. It uses much of the marathon course, but only spends about half the time in Zhongzheng District and does not follow the Keelung River east as far as the marathon does, electing instead to cross west over the Keelung River via the Second MacArthur Bridge to head to the finish.

== See also ==
- List of winners of the Taipei Marathon
- List of sporting events in Taiwan
- List of marathon races in Asia
