= Casablanca Marathon =

Road running event in Morocco

- Date: October
- Location: Casablanca
- Event type: Road running
- Distance: Marathon
- Established: 2008
- Course records: Men: 2:06:41 (Kenya) Daniel Kiprono Sang (2026); Women: 2:25:21 (Ethiopia) Aylew Bere (2026)
- Website: Casablanca Marathon

The Casablanca Marathon is an annual marathon held in Casablanca, Morocco.

At the inaugural edition of the race in 2008, Moroccan runner Adil Annani won the men's race while the women's race was won by Japanese runner Kaori Yoshida.

The current course record holder for the mens marathon is Daniel Kiprono Sang and Aylew Bere for Women.

== History ==
As of 2026, the Casablanca Marathon is regarded as the largest running activity in Morocco, hosting the 42.195-kilometer marathon, the 21.097-kilometer half-marathon, and a 4 × 10.5-kilometer relay race.

== Past winners ==
Key: Course record

Edition	Year	Men's winner	Time (h:m:s)	Women's winner	Time (h:m:s)
1st	2008	Adil Annani (MAR)	2:12:03	Kaori Yoshida (JAP)	2:31:44
2nd	2009	Hillary Kipchumba (KEN)	2:12:37	Amane Seid (ETH)	2:34:32
3rd	2010	Shume Gerbaba (ETH)	2:09:03	Yeshimebet Tadesse (ETH)	2:31:10
4th	2011	Abdelaziz Ennaji El Idrissi (MAR)	2:12:55	Wudnesh Nega Debele (ETH)	2:50:05
5th	2012	Laalaui Charkaui (MAR)	2:18:42	Meriem Khali (MAR)	2:54:25
6th	2013	Milton Rotich (KEN)	2:08:55	Taye Gulilat (ETH)	2:34:46
7th	2014	Philemon Rotich (KEN)	2:10:19	Sara Kiptoo (KEN)	2:35:22
8th	2015	Jonathan Yego Kiptoo (KEN)	2:10:42	Alem Mokonnin (ETH)	2:31:03
9th	2016	Khalil Lamciyeh (MAR)	2:14:55	Meka Wake Washo (ETH)	2:39:51
10th	2017	Evans Kipkoech (KEN)	2:09:39	Yiman Mengistu (ETH)	2:31:48
11th	2018	Erick Ndiema (KEN)	2:12:55	Naomi Maiyo (KEN)	2:35:02
12th	2019	Sammy Kigen Korir (KEN)	2:08:32	Lilian Jebitok (KEN)	2:31:31
13th	2022	Samir Jaouher (MAR)	2:12:27	Jane Moraa Onyangi (KEN)	2:34:29
14th	2023	Limo Johnson Kiprop (KEN)	2:13:29	Mukami Waithira (KEN)	2:29:46
15th	2024	Hamza Sahli (MAR)	2:09:03	Joan Kilimo (KEN)	2:27:41
16th	2025	El Mahjoub Dazza (MAR)	2:09:47	Kaltoum Bouaasayriya (MAR)	2:29:50
17th	2026	Daniel Kiprono Sang (KEN)	2:06:41	Aylew Bere (ETH)	2:25:21

=== Semi Marathon ===
Year	Men's winner	Time (h:m:s)	Women's winner	Time (h:m:s)
2026	Yakoub Labquira (MAR)	1:01:21	Fatiha Asmid (MAR)	1:07:22
