= Paul Lonyangata =

Kenyan long-distance runner

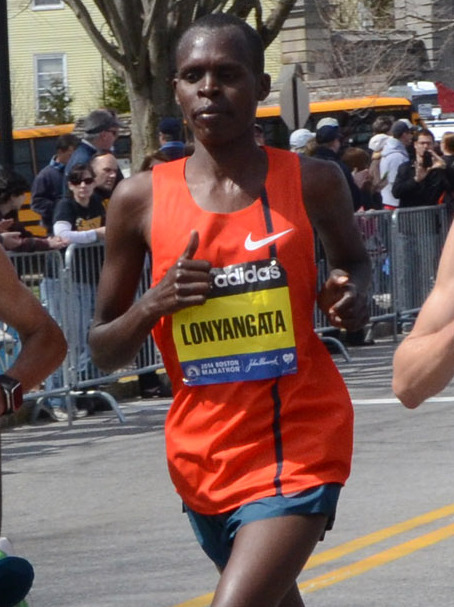
Lonyangata at the 2014 Boston Marathon

Paul Kipchumba Lonyangata (born 12 December 1992) is a Kenyan long-distance runner who specialises in road running events. He is a marathon runner with a personal best of 2:06:10 and has won marathons in Lisbon, Shanghai, Taipei and Paris. He was a bronze medallist at the World Junior Championships in Athletics in 2010.

== Career ==
His first success in running came over 10,000 metres at the 2010 World Junior Championships in Athletics. He and Dennis Masai used team work to reach the podium, Masai as champion and Lonyangata as bronze medallist. He competed on the European track running circuit in 2010 and 2011 and scored several top three finishes in second-tier level meetings, such as the Palio della Quercia and the Barcelona Meet. He began working with Italian coach Gabriele Rosa and, training alongside another Kenyan Joel Kimurer, he moved towards road running instead after 2011. He had his first win at the Tegla Loroupe Peace Race in 2011.

In 2012 he placed in the top ten at the World's Best 10K then had a quick half marathon debut of 59:53 minutes at the Berlin Half Marathon. Travelling to the United States, after a fifth-place finish at the Peachtree Road Race he closed his season in the runner-up spot at the Rock 'n' Roll Philadelphia Half Marathon. A marathon debut followed at the beginning of 2013 and he was second in a time of 2:07:44 hours at the Xiamen Marathon. This placed him near the world's top forty runners for the year. On his next outing, however, he failed to finish at the Linz Marathon. His fortunes reversed that September with his first at the distance at the Lisbon Marathon. He was one second off his best at the RAK Half Marathon at the start of 2014 and this preceded his entry to his first major race: the 2014 Boston Marathon.

Lonyangata reached the top ten at the Boston Marathon and also finished runner-up at the Honolulu Marathon that year. He changed coaching arrangements, moving back to Kenyan to Kaptagat to work with former runner James Kwambai. Lonyangata married a fellow runner, Purity Cherotich Rionoripo, during this period. He missed most of the 2015 season, but returned in strong form at the Shanghai Marathon, winning in 2:07:14 hours – a course record. A return at the 2016 Boston Marathon saw him improve upon his finish two years earlier, as he closed the race in fifth position.

In 2019, he competed in the men's marathon at the 2019 World Athletics Championships held in Doha, Qatar. He did not finish his race.

== Personal life ==
Lonyangata is married to Kenyan runner Purity Rionoripo.

== Personal bests ==
- 3000 metres – 7:39.72 min (2011)
- 5000 metres – 13:08.01 min (2011)
- 10,000 metres – 27:21.62 min (2011)
- 10K run – 27:57 min (2015)
- Half marathon – 59:53 min (2012)
- Marathon – 2:06:10 (2017)

== International competitions ==
Year	Competition	Venue	Position	Event	Notes
2010	World Junior Championships	Moncton, Canada	3rd	10,000 m	28:14.55
2013	Xiamen International Marathon	Xiamen, China	2nd	Marathon	2:07:44
2013	Lisbon Marathon	Lisbon, Spain	1st	Marathon	2:09:45
2014	Boston Marathon	Boston, United States	9th	Marathon	2:12:34
2014	Honolulu Marathon	Honolulu, United States	2nd	Marathon	2:16:04
2015	Shanghai International Marathon	Shanghai, China	1st	Marathon	2:07:14
2016	Boston Marathon	Boston, United States	5th	Marathon	2:15:45
2016	Chicago Marathon	Chicago, United States	4th	Marathon	2:13:17
2017	Paris Marathon	Paris, France	1st	Marathon	2:06:10
2018	Paris Marathon	Paris, France	1st	Marathon	2:06:25
2019	Paris Marathon	Paris, France	3rd	Marathon	2:07:29
2019	Shanghai International Marathon	Shanghai, China	1st	Marathon	2:08:11

== Road race wins ==
- Tegla Loroupe Peace Race: 2011
- Lisbon Marathon: 2013
- Shanghai Marathon: 2015
- Paris Marathon: 2017
- Paris Marathon: 2018
